= Chyhyryn campaign (1676) =

1676 Russian military expedition

- Part of Russo-Turkish War (1672–1681) and The Ruin (Ukrainian history)
Date	August–October 1676
Location	Chyhyryn, Right-bank Ukraine
Result	Cossack–Russian victory
Territorial changes	End of Doroshenko's rule on the Right-bank Ukraine

Belligerents
Right-bank Hetmanate	Russia; Left-bank Hetmanate; Zaporozhian Sich

Commanders and leaders
Petro Doroshenko (surrendered)	Grigory Romodanovsky; Patrick Gordon; Ivan Samoilovich; Ivan Sirko

Strength
200 serdiuks 59 cannons (Note: 21 of them were disabled)	50,000

The Chyhyryn campaign was a military expedition launched by the Russian-led army in September 1676, in order to oust Petro Doroshenko from power. The campaign ended in a Doroshenko's surrender and became a pretext for the Chyhyryn campaigns of 1677 and 1678.

== Background ==
The Russian forces and the Cossacks of Ivan Samoylovych had previously launched a campaign with the goal of capturing the Right-bank from Doroshenko and the Ottoman Empire. After facing initial success and besieging Chyhyryn, the Ottoman army of Kara Mustafa Pasha was sent to recapture the region. After the victory at Ladyzhyn, the Cossack–Russian army was forced to lift the siege and retreat behind the Dnieper. The cities that previously pledged their loyalty to Samoylovych were brutally pacified. However Doroshenko, who was in a disastrous situation due to most of starshyna cutting ties with him, surrendered and pledged loyalty to Alexis of Russia in the presence of Ivan Sirko in October 1675. This was, however, unaccepted by Romodanovsky and Samoilovich who were demanding him to pledge loyalty to the tsar in the Left-bank. Doroshenko refused. Some modern historians consider Doroshenko's surrender as an attempt to win the time. Although Doroshenko was temporarily left with no external support, it was renewed in the spring of 1676, when the Crimean–Cossack army began preparing for a major raid on the Left-bank Ukraine.

== Campaign ==
After concerning that most of the Ottoman army is fighting on the Polish front, in August 1676, the Russian–Cossack army went on a campaign. On 11 August, Romodanovsky left Kursk and on 30 August, his army united with Samoilovich's Cossacks near Lokhvytsia. Soon they approached Chyhyryn, quickly defeated the local guard and besieged the city. Seeing no other choice, on 19 September, Doroshenko surrendered Chyhyryn and the hetman's title to Ivan Samoylovych and was exiled to Left-bank, from where he was sent to Russia. The Russians soon entered Chyhyryn and placed a garrison there. Most of the Right-bank starshyna also joined Samoylovych.

== Aftermath ==
Petro Doroshenko handed over his Hetman's insignia to Ivan Sirko. The campaign ended Doroshenko's rule on the Right-bank, which, according to some Ukrainian historians consider, ended the Ukrainian national revolution. M.O. Krovkov became a new voivode of Chyhyryn. Ottoman Empire did not wanted to lose the Right-bank and in February 1677, it appointed Yurii Khmelnytsky as a hetman of Right-bank Ukraine. In order to help Khmelnytsky in regaining control over Right-bank Ukraine, the Ottomans and their allies launched two Chyhyryn campaigns. The first one ended unsuccessfully, the siege of Chyhyryn was lifted and the Ottoman army retreated beyond the Inhul. However, in the second campaign the Turks managed to oust the Russians and the Cossacks from Chyhyryn, although they left the city after some time due to frequent raids of Ivan Sirko.
