= Chyhyryn campaign (1677) =

1677 Ottoman military campaign

- Part of the Russo-Turkish War and the Ruin
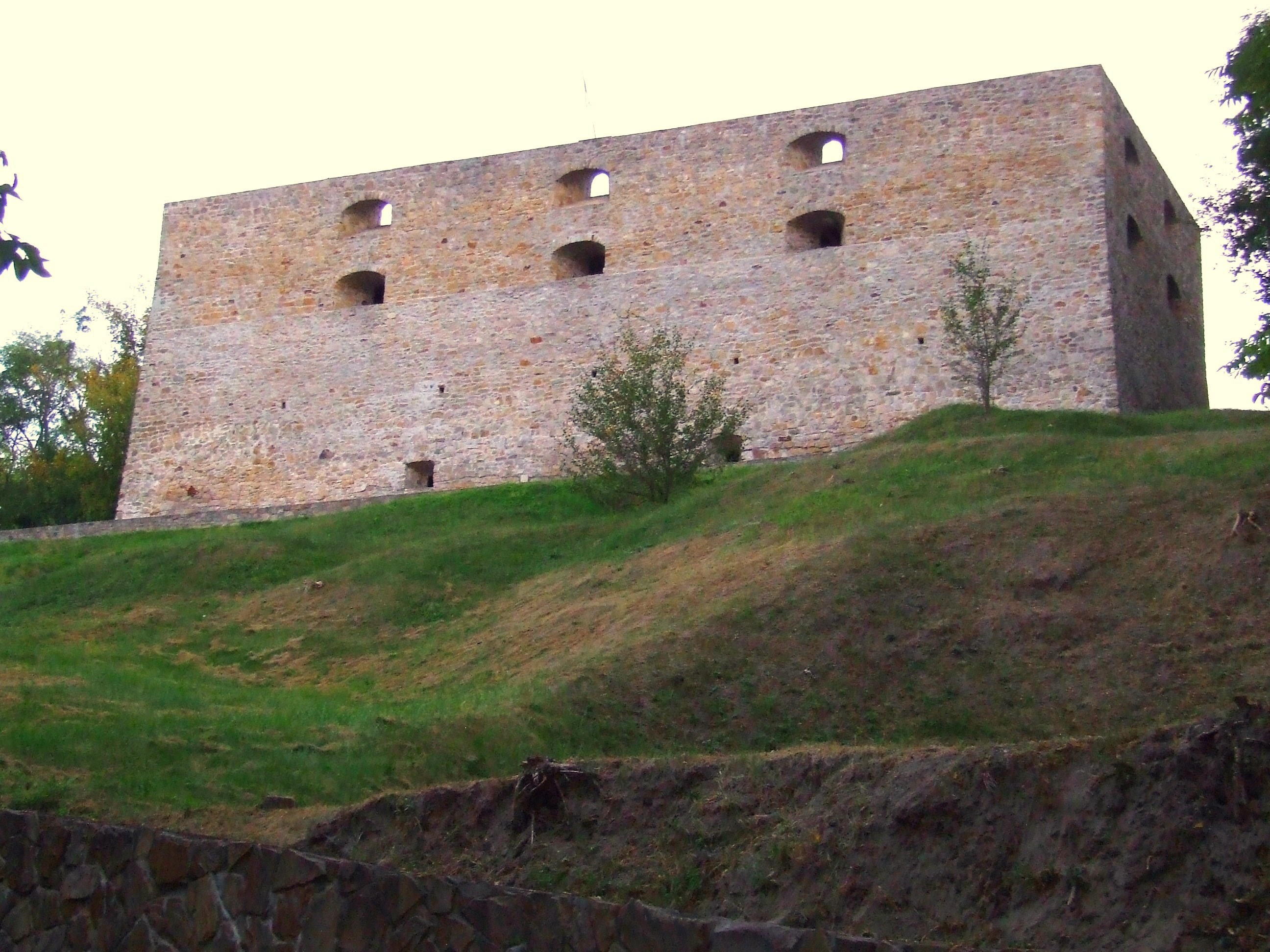
- Doroshenko's bastion in Chigirin
Date	3 – 29 August 1677
Location	Chyhyryn, Right-bank Ukraine
Result	Russian–Cossack victory (See § Aftermath)
Territorial changes	Ottoman forces repulsed from Chyhyryn

Belligerents
Tsardom of Russia; Cossack Hetmanate; Supported by: Zaporozhian Sich	Ottoman Empire; Crimean Khanate

Commanders and leaders
Grigory Romodanovsky; Afanasiy Trauernicht; Ivan Samoylovych; Hryhoriy Korovka-Volsky; Prokip Levenets (WIA); Supported by: Ivan Sirko	(Ottoman Empire) Shaitan Ibrahim Pasha; Selim I Giray

Strength
Garrison: 4,500 (Note: Per the Turkish reports) to 12,500: 5,000 Russians; 7,200 Cossacks; Relief army: 52,000–54,000 Russians and Cossacks	60,000 to 78,000 (Note: Some sources, such as Borysenko put the Ottoman strength as high as 100 thousand, including over 50 thousand Turks, 19 thousand Wallachians and 40 thousand Tatars)

Casualties and losses
8,000 killed and wounded	20,000 total casualties

The Chyhyryn campaign of 1677 was an unsuccessful campaign by the Ottoman-led coalition against the Cossack-Russian defenders of Chyhyryn. On 3 of August, the Ottoman army besieged Chyhyryn, which was held by 12,000-strong garrison. At the end of August, the Russo-Cossack army of Romodanovsky and Samoylovych crossed the Dnieper. The Ottoman-Crimean forces tried to stop them but were decisively defeated at Buzhyn and on 29 of August, Ibrahim Pasha burned the Turkish camp and retreated, while the Russo-Cossack army entered Chyhyryn on 5 of September.

== Background ==
The Russian forces had previously tried to seize Right-bank Ukraine from Doroshenko in 1674, however once Kara Mustafa Pasha came to assist Doroshenko, the Russo-Cossack army was forced to retreat beyond the Dnieper, while several Right bank cities, such as Ladyzhyn and Uman were sacked. Next time the Russian army invaded Right-bank Ukraine in 1676, using the fact that the main Ottoman army was at war with Poland. The Russo-Cossack army besieged Chyhyryn and forced Doroshenko to surrender. Learning about what happened, the Ottoman Sultan Mehmed IV appointed Yurii Khmelnytsky, who had been the sultan's prisoner at that time, as a hetman of Right-bank Ukraine. In July 1677, the sultan ordered his army of 45,000 men under the command of Ibrahim Pasha to advance towards Chyhyryn. Chyhyryn's garrison consisted of, according to different estimates, from 4,500, to 12,500 people led by voivode Afanasiy Trauernicht.

== Campaign ==
=== Siege ===
On 30 July 1677, the first Ottoman detachments appeared near the fortress, and on August 3 – the main forces encircled the city, siege began. On the same day, August 3, the besieged launched their first raid. Next day the raid was repeated, but this time with larger forces: Over a thousand Cossacks and 900 riflemen participated. Meanwhile, a battle took place on the Old Wall of Chyhyryn. The besieged routed the Ottomans and forced them to retreat on the second line trenches, while successfully returning to the fortress. On 5 of August, Ibrahim Pasha sent a letter to Chyhyryn garrison, demanding surrender. After the garrison's commander refused, the Turks began bombarding the Upper town and the Spasskaya tower with heavy artillery, leading to a partial destruction of the Chyhyryn wall. On 7 of August, 1800-strong Cossack–Russian unit attacked the Turkish trenches and inflicted a heavy casualties, up to 1 thousand killed Turks. On 8 of August, Chmielnicki arrived to the Ottoman camp. He demanded the Cossack defenders to surrender the Lower town, however his demands were rejected. On 10 of August, the relief armies of Samoylovych and Romodanovsky's united and launched their march towards Chyhyryn. From 11 August onwards, the Turks kept bombarding the city, leading to a serious damage to its walls. The Janissaries then launched a series of assaults on the city but all of them were repelled by the Russo-Ukrainian garrison. On 20 of August, a 2000-strong unit of Russians and Cossacks came to assist the besieged and to inform about the upcoming relief army. The Ottoman attempts to capture the city with an assaults were repeated on 17, 22 and 24 of August, but all of them were repelled. Meanwhile, on 24 of August the army of Romodanovsky and Samoylovych crossed the Sula river and appeared near Buzhyn carriage on the next day.

=== Romodanovsky's arrival ===
On August 26–27, a skirmish between the relief army and the Ottomans took place. The Russo-Cossack army destroyed Ottoman observation posts and allowed the rest of the Russian and Ukrainian forces to cross the Dnieper under the cover of artillery fire. Turkish attempts to push the first crossing detachment under the command of Major-General Shepelev back into the river were repulsed. Russian and Ukrainian cavalry attacked and overwhelmed the Turkish-Tatar army camp on August 28, inflicting heavy casualties. The following day, Ibrahim Pasha was forced to lift the siege of Chyhyryn and hastily retreat to the Inhul river and beyond.

== Aftermath ==
Samoilovich and Grigory Romodanovsky relieved Chyhyryn on September 5. The Ottoman Army had lost 20,000 men and Ibrahim Pasha was imprisoned upon his return to Constantinople, while the Crimean Khan Selim I Giray lost his throne. Following the campaign, Patrick Gordon was appointed by the Russian government as the major general of the Chyhyryn garrison. The campaign of 1677 overall ended with a Russian victory as the Russo-Cossack troops managed to repel the Turko-Tatar march on Chyhyryn. Despite the defeat in 1677, the desire of the Ottomans to take revenge and secure Right-Bank Ukraine under their protectorate was too strong. In 1678, Mehmed IV personally supervised the Ottoman army and appointed Kara Mustafa Pasha to lead the Ottoman army in the new campaign on Chyhyryn. The Ottoman army reached Chyhyryn on 8 of July and began a siege, which, although ended with a temporary Ottoman capture of Chyhyryn on 18 of August, made impossible for the Ottomans to continue such large-scale campaigns and the continuous raids of Ivan Sirko against the Ottomans forced Kara Mustafa to retreat from Chyhyryn. The Russo-Turkish war had eventually ended with a Treaty of Bakhchisarai in January of 1681.

== See also ==
- Chyhyryn campaign (1674)
- Chyhyryn campaign (1676)
- Chyhyryn campaign (1678)

== Bibliography ==
- Hodyreva, G.V. (1999). Борьба России и Турции за украинские земли 1677-1678 гг (PDF) (in Russian). Vernadsky National Library of Ukraine.
- Borysenko, Volodymyr (2002). Героїчна оборона Чигирина в 1677—1678 рр. Kyiv.
- Davies, Brian (2007). Warfare, State and Society on the Black Sea Steppe, 1500–1700. Routledge. ISBN 978-0-203-96176-6.
- Yafarova, Madina (2017). Русско-Османское противостояние в 1677-1678 гг. [Russo-Ottoman confrontation of 1677-1678] (PDF) (candidate of science thesis) (in Russian). Moscow: MSU.
- Sedov, P.V. (2002). Оборона Чигирина в 1677 г. // Российское государство в XIV—XVII вв. ISBN 5-86007-305-4.
