= Chyhyryn campaign =

Chyhyryn campaign may refer to:

- Chyhyryn campaign (1674), siege conducted by Russian-Cossack forces
- Chyhyryn campaign (1676), campaign by the Ottoman-led coalition against the Cossack-Russian defenders of Chyhyryn
- Chyhyryn campaign (1677), military expedition launched by the Russian-led army in September 1676, in order to oust Petro Doroshenko from power
- Chyhyryn campaign (1678), campaign launched by the Ottoman-led coalition against the Cossack-Russian defenders of Chyhyryn with the goal of capturing the fortress
