= Battle of Buzhyn (1677) =

- Part of the Russo-Turkish War and the Ruin
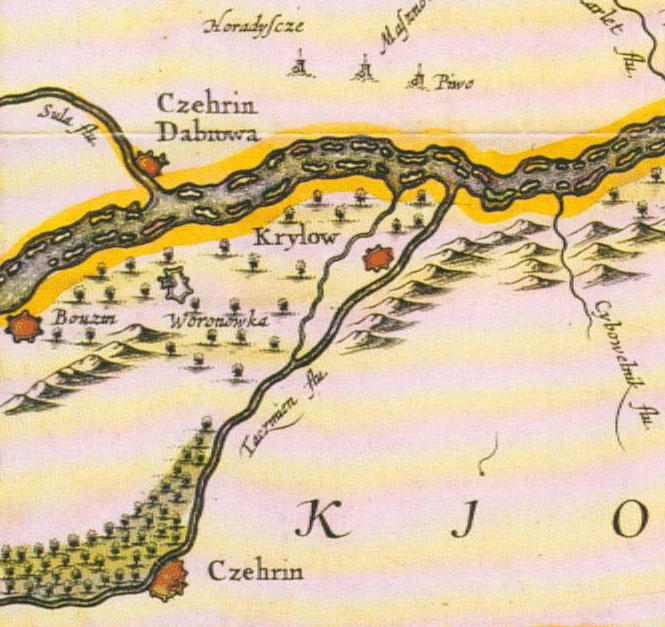
- Czehrin at the bottom and the Dnieper through the middle of the map (the north to the left)
Date	27–28 August 1677
Location	Buzhyn
Result	Russian-led victory

Belligerents
(Tsardom of Russia) Russian Tsardom; Cossack Hetmanate of Ivan Samoylovych	Ottoman Empire; Crimean Khanate

Commanders and leaders
(Cossack Hetmanate) Ivan Samoilovich (Tsardom of Russia) Grigory Romodanovsky	(Ottoman Empire) Ibrahim Pasha ("Shaitan"); Selim I Giray

Strength
52,000–54,000	65,000

Casualties and losses
Unknown	20,000 casualties

Battle of Buzhyn (battles near Buzhyn Carriage) was a battle of 27–28 August 1677 between the Russian-Ukrainian army under the command of Prince Grigory Romodanovsky and Hetman Ivan Samoilovich, and the Ottoman-Crimean troops of Ibrahim Pasha ("Shaitan") and Khan Selim-Girey during the Russo-Turkish War (1676–1681). It took place on the coastal bridgehead near Buzhyn, near the Dnieper crossing and 20 kilometers north of Chyhyryn.

== Background ==
=== 1677 campaign ===
Having defeated the Poles the previous year, Ibrahim Pasha's army marched from the Danube to Ukraine on 29 June 1677. The campaign involved about 65 thousand men (according to various estimates from 60 to 80 thousand), including 15 thousand Janissaries and other Turkish infantry, 20-30 thousand Serbs, Wallachians and Moldavians, 20-40 thousand Tatars; the Turks had 35 guns. The Turkish commander planned to take Chyhyryn and then Kyiv in three days. Chyhyryn was defended by a garrison of 9 thousand men: soldiers, riflemen and Ukrainian Cossacks.

Back in March–April, the Moscow government decided to send two armies against the Turks. On 23 May the Grand Regiment of Prince Vasiliy Golitsyn left Moscow for the place of concentration — Sevsk. Belgorod and Sevsk regiments under the command of Prince Romodanovsky gathered in Belgorod. The deployment of the main forces so far from the Dnieper was caused by the need to cover the border from possible hostile actions on the part of Poland. Romodanovsky's army numbered 34,500 men. When it became clear that the Turks and Tatars would go to Chyhyryn, but not by the Muravskiy road, the troops came to the aid of the fortress. They moved extremely slowly. The siege of Chyhyryn began on August 3, and only on the 10th Romodanovsky's army came to the Akropolote River, more than a hundred kilometres from the fortress. There the Russians joined the Cossacks of Hetman Samoilovich (20 thousand), and then stood in place for another three days, probably waiting for the stragglers. The Moscow troops, with the exception of the capital's Streltsy and two elected Moscow soldier regiments, were a poorly organised and clumsy mass, the fighting qualities of which have been the subject of historical debate for over a hundred years now. At the same time, the Russians vastly outnumbered the Turks in artillery, with 126 guns.

Golitsyn set out from Putyvl on 7 August and reached the Dnieper bank after the Turkish troops had retreated. Golitsyn's army consisted of regiments of the "new system", characterised by such poor discipline that the government issued arms to dragoons and raitars only during combat operations, but not on the march, justly fearing that otherwise they would sell their carbines and pistols. The Prince asked for arms to be sent from Moscow, but they were not sent until the 2nd of September, when they were no longer needed. The commander had to arm his men with home-made lances.

On the way Romodanovsky and Samoilovich sent reinforcements to Chigirin, the detachment of Colonel Fedor Tumashev (615 Belgorod dragoons and 800 Serdyuks), which secretly approached the besieged fortress, and in the morning of 20 August with unfurled banners and to the beat of drums entered Chigirin, managing to avoid losses either because of the sluggishness of the Turks, or because it was missed by the Tatars, who did not want a victory for the Sultan's troops for fear that the capture of Ukraine by the Turks will deprive the autonomy and Crimea.

== Crossing the Dnieper ==
24—25 August the troops reached the bank of the Dnieper River at Buzhyn Carriagethis place the river narrowed considerably, and the right bank went forward in the form of a peninsula. Ibrahim Pasha sent the Crimean Khan with considerable forces to Buzhin toyprevent the crossing, but he was too late. The Tatar detachments were driven away from the shore by artillery fire, and at three o'clock in the morning of 26/27 August the troops began the crossing. The advanced detachment was commanded by Colonel Voeikov from the elective regiment of Aggei Shepelev, and Colonels Verstov, Levenets and Barsuk. The indiscriminate firing opened by the Turks was suppressed by the fire of guns from the left bank, where Romodanovsky personally supervised the installation of cannons. Thanks to this the advanced units crossed almost without losses. Having landed, in a short fight they pushed back the Turkish detachment and, having occupied a bridgehead on the bank, began to build a retrenchment.

Major-General Shepelev took command of the troops on the right bank bridgehead. On the morning of the 27th the second elective regiment of Matvei Kravkov crossed the right bank, followed by the rest of the troops, including the regiment of Patrick Gordon, who left a description of these events in his diary.

== Battle ==
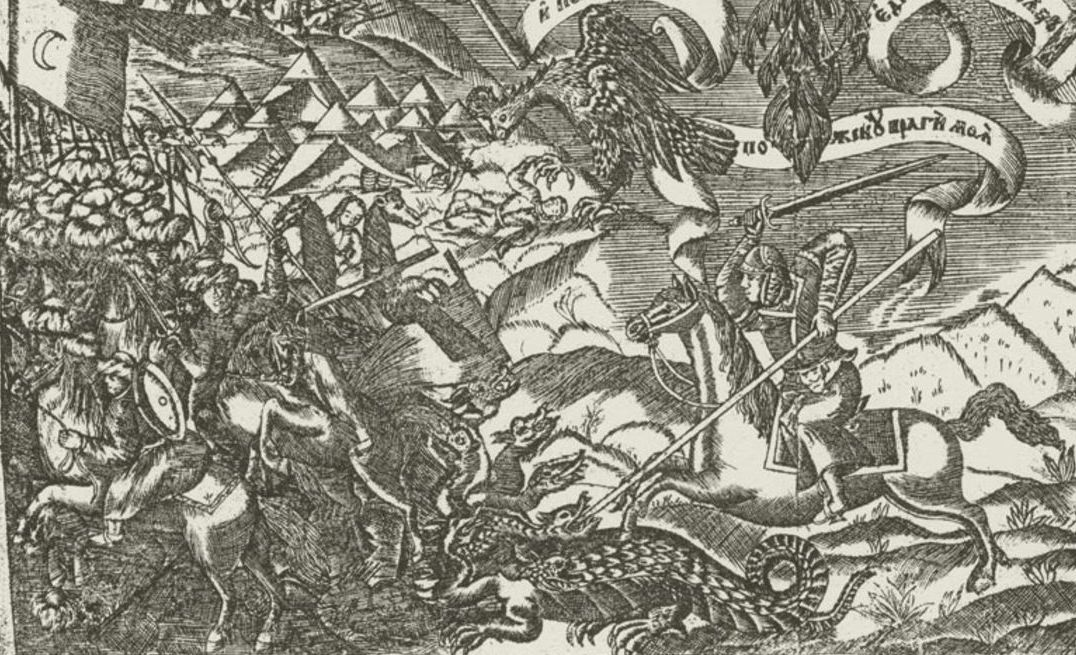
Grigori Romodanovsky pursues the retreating Turks

It was not until the afternoon of 27 August that the Turks attacked the Russian positions. This battle decided the success of the whole crossing, as by that time there were only a few regiments on the right bank, but the first and second elective regiments repelled the Janissaries' attack. Having received a report from the khan and Turkish commanders that they could not hold back the Russians, Ibrahim Pasha sent them reinforcements, and with the remaining forces made a last desperate attempt to seize Chyhyryn.

Meanwhile, Romodanovsky and Samoilovich had already transported 15,000 men under the command of Colonels Kosagov and Novitsky, who launched an attack and repulsed the numerically superior enemy forces.

On the 28th the battle continued. Having expanded the occupied bridgehead, the Allies finished the crossing and "having won a notable victory over the enemy, many were beaten, driving them five versts from the Dnieper..." The Turks suffered significant losses (about 10,000 killed, according to the French ambassador in Constantinople F. de la Croix), the son of the Crimean khan and the sons of the pasha were left lying on the battlefield. Traditionally, the losses of the Russian and Ukrainian armies are estimated at 2,460 killed and 5,000 wounded. For the first time, these figures were named by the Soviet historian Vodarsky. Russian historians Vladimir Velikanov and Maxim Nechitailov checked the links provided by the author and did not find any documents related to Russian losses at all. The authors also note that there are documents on the losses of individual units, for example, the Shepelev regiment, which was the first to cross the Dnieper and join the battle, its losses, according to the document, amounted to 15 dead, 4 wounded and 8 missing.

== Results ==
The defeat at Buzhyn Pass forced Ibrahim Pasha to lift the siege of Chyhyryn on the night of 29 August and to retreat in a hurry in order not to be surrounded. The victory of the troops of Romodanovsky and Samoilovich saved the fortress, which was already running out of ammunition, and meant victory in the campaign of 1677. The merits of the commanders of the elected regiments, who took the brunt of the enemy's attack, were recognised by the tsar, who promoted them to the following ranks: Aggei Shepelev became lieutenant-general and Matvei Kravkov became major-general. The major Russian victory at Buzhyn is compared in its scale with the victory of the Polish king Jan Sobieski at Khotyn, four years earlier.

== See also ==
- Chigirin Campaigns
- Treaty of Bakhchisarai
- Polish-Ottoman War (1672–1676)

== Literature ==
- Yaroslav Vodarskiy. Международное положение Русского государства и русско-турецкая война 1676—1681 гг. // Очерки истории СССР. Период феодализма. XVII век. М.: Издательство АН СССР, 1955
- Alexander Malov Московские выборные полки солдатского строя в борьбе за Чигирин в 1677—1678 годах // Гордон П. Дневник 1677–1688. М.: Наука, 2005. — 235 с. — ISBN 5-02-009861-2
- Османская империя и страны Центральной, Восточной и Юго-Восточной Европы в XVII в. Часть II. / Отв. ред. Gennadiy Litavrin. М.: Памятники исторической мысли, 2001. — 400 с. — ISBN 5-88451-114-0
- Pavel Sedov Оборона Чигирина в 1677 г. // Российское государство в XIV—XVII вв. СПб.: Дмитрий Буланин, 2002 — ISBN 5-86007-305-4
- Perrie, Maurren (2006). The Cambridge history of Russia. Volume 1: From early Rus' to 1689. Cambridge university Press. ISBN 0-521-81227-5.
- Velikanov, Vladimir; Nechitailov, Maxim (2019). Азиатский дракон перед Чигирином [Asian dragon in front of Chigirin] (in Russian). Russian Academy of Sciences: Ratnoe delo. Moscow: Русские витязи. ISBN 978-5-6041924-7-4.
