= Yedisan =

Ottoman vassal in Ukraine

Yedisan Єдисан (Ukrainian), Yedisan (Turkish)
- 1667–1792
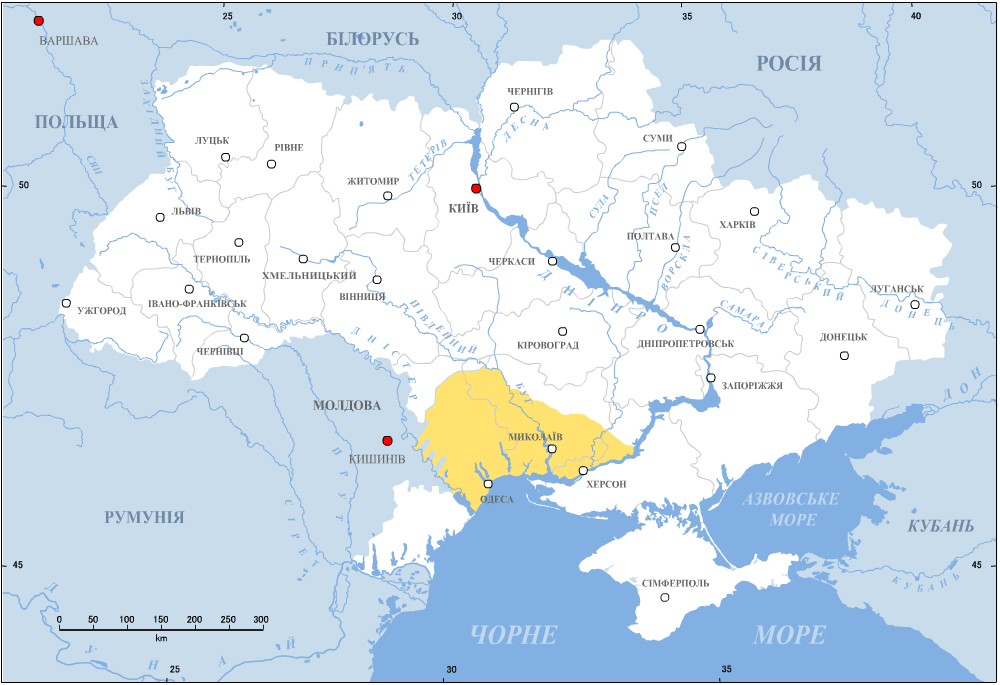
- Location of Yedisan in Ukraine
- History
  - Truce of Andrusovo: 1667
  - Treaty of Jassy: 1792
- Today part of: Ukraine; Republic of Moldova

Yedisan (also Jedisan or Edisan; Ukrainian: Єдисан, romanized: Yedysan, Romanian: Edisan, Ottoman Turkish: یدیصان, Turkish: Yedisan, Russian: Едисан, romanized: Yedisan, Dobrujan Tatar: Ğedísan) was a conditional name for Özi [Paşa] Sancağı (Ochakiv Sanjak) of Silistra Eyalet, a territory located in today's Southern Ukraine between the Dniester and the Southern Bug (Boh). It was placed by the Ottomans under the control of the Nogai Horde in the 17th and 18th centuries and was named after one of the Nogai Hordes.

Geographically, it was the western part of the so-called Wild Fields that sprawled to the north of the Black Sea between the Dniester and Dnieper rivers. It lies east of Budjak and Bessarabia, south of Podolia and Zaporizhzhia, and west of Taurida. Since the mid-20th century, the territory has been divided between southwestern Ukraine and southeastern Moldova (southern Transnistria).

== Name ==
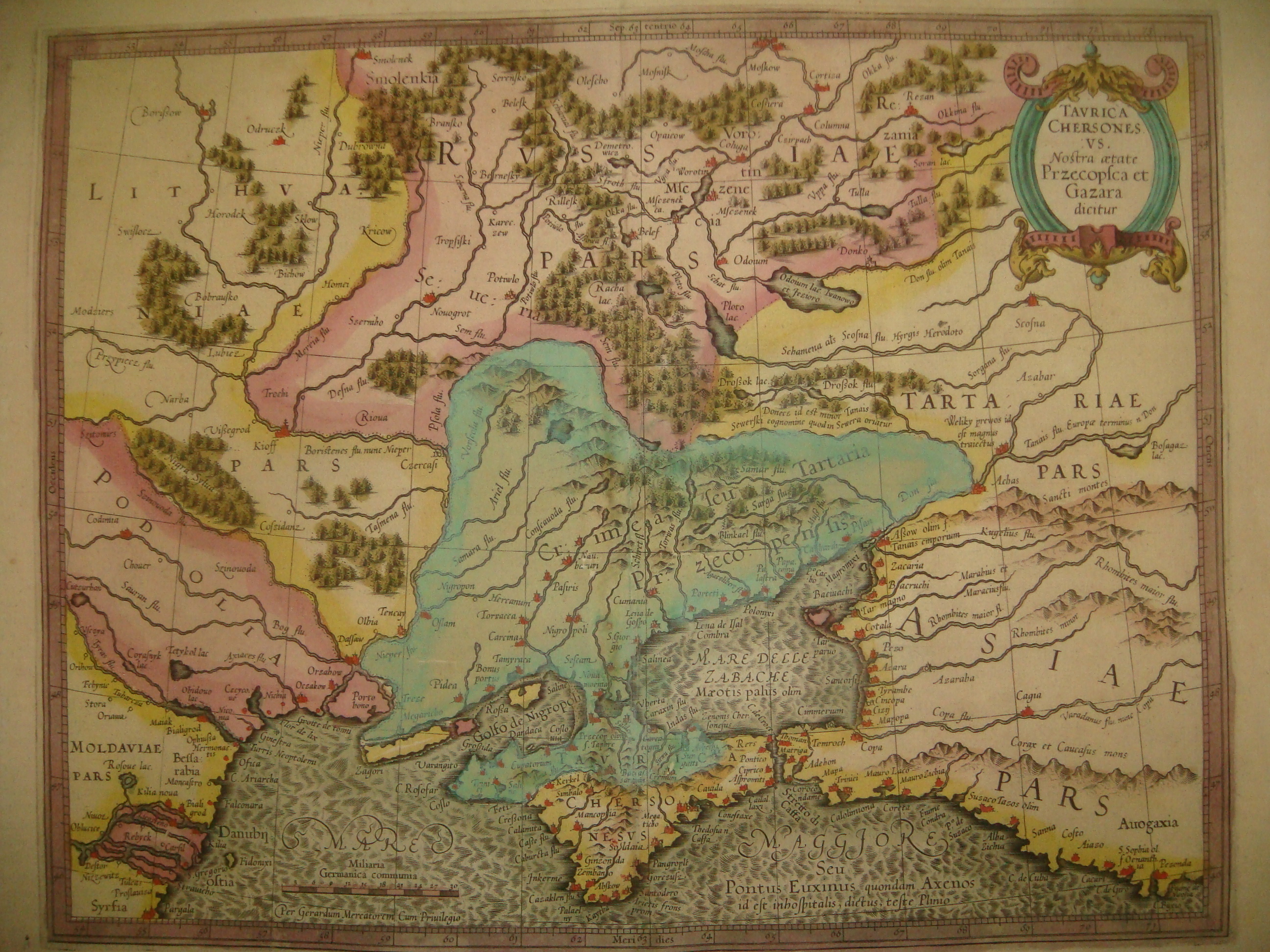
There was no Yedisan in 16-17th centuries, there was Podolia instead.

"Yedisan" is Turkic for "Seven Titles"; doubtless the sept was made up of seven subgroups. Yedisan was also sometimes referred to as Ochakov Tartary after Ochakov (Ochakiv), the main fortress of the region. Names for the region in different language include: Ukrainian: Єдисан [Yedysan]; Russian: Едисан [Yedisan]; Romanian: Edisan; Crimean Tatar and Turkish: Yedisan; German: Jedisan; Polish: Jedysan.

The region was also referred to as Ottoman Ukraine (Ukrainian: Османська Україна, romanized: Osmanska Ukraina), Khan Ukraine (Ханська Україна, Khanska Ukraina) and Hanshchyna (Ганьщина) In the Russian Empire, it was referred to as Ochakov Oblast, while the Ottoman Turks called it simply Özü after the city of Ochakiv which served as its administrative center. Another name used was Western Nogai.

== History ==
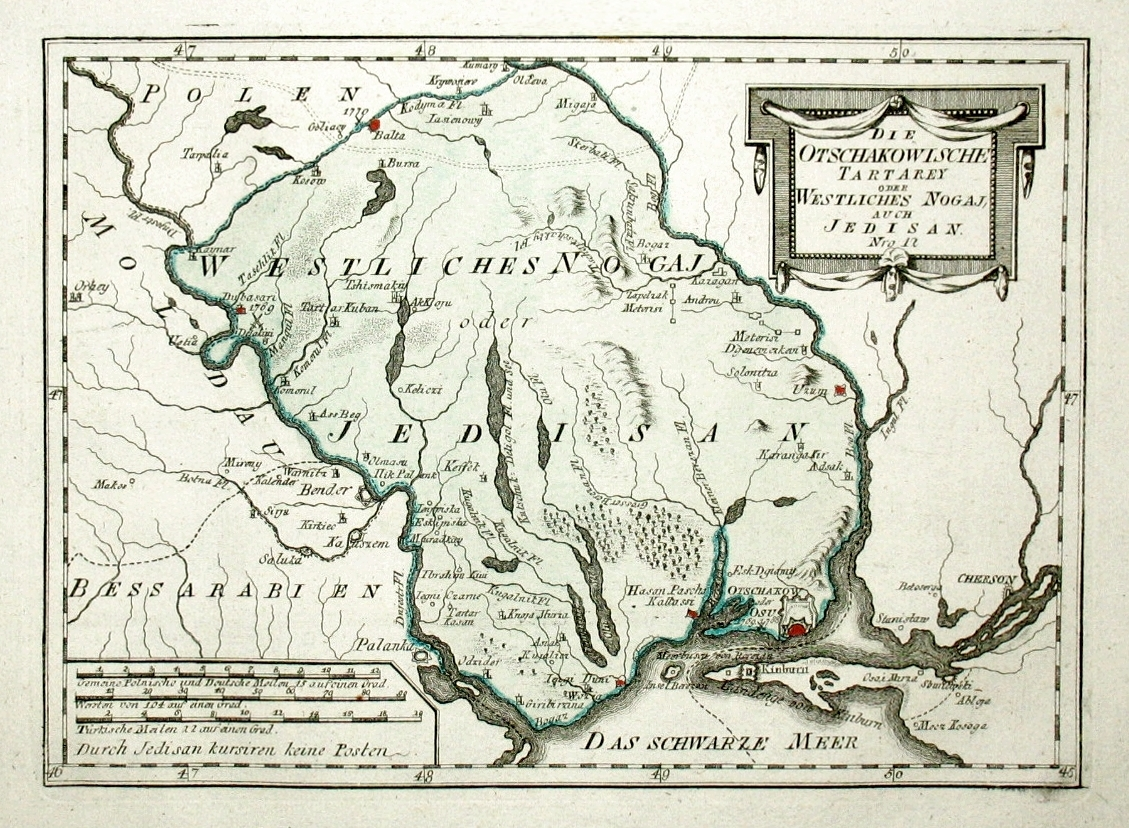
"Die Otschakowische Tartarey oder Westliches Nogaj, auch Jedisan" a map published in Vienna c. 1790 (Note: Durch Jedisan kursiren keine Posten)

The southern, coastal edge of territory had been occupied by the Crimean Khanate since the 1520s in order to enable the slave raidings. The territory appeared as a consequence of the 1667 Truce of Andrusovo, which divided the Cossack Hetmanate, without consideration of the local population between the Polish–Lithuanian Commonwealth and the Tsardom of Russia. Since 1669, the Ottoman authorities granted protectorate to the Cossack statehood west of the Dnieper and designated it into a separate sanjak which was headed by Cossack Hetman Petro Doroshenko. It was confirmed by the Treaty of Buchach in 1672.

The territory was bordered to its west by Podolia Eyalet and its south by Silistra Eyalet. With the help of Petro Doroshenko, the Ottomans were able to occupy Podilia and established its province in 1672. In 1676 the new King of Poland, Jan III Sobieski, managed to recover some of the lost territories of Ukraine and stopped paying a tribute after signing the Truce of Zhuravno. Also in 1676, Ivan Samoylovych, along with the boyar Grigory Romodanovsky, led a successful campaign against Doroshenko forcing him to surrender and occupied the Cossack capital, Chyhyryn. Between 1677 and 1678 a powerful army of Ibrahim Pasha fought over the control of Chyhyryn (see Russo-Turkish War (1676–81)). Eventually, the army of the Grand Vizier Kara Mustafa Pasha was successful in taking control over Chyhyryn, in 1678. The city of Nemyriv became the Hetman residence between the 1670s and 1699.

After the 1681 Treaty of Bakhchisarai, Ottoman Ukraine came under the government of Moldavia by Hospodar George Ducas.

In 1685, Polish king John III Sobieski revived some Cossack freedoms in right-bank Ukraine and signed the Eternal Peace Treaty of 1686 with Russia securing an alliance against the Ottoman Empire.

The area at times was incorporated into the Ottoman administrative structure as part of Silistra (Özi) Eyalet with the fortresses of Khadjibey (Odesa) and Özi (Ochakiv) as major centers. It was also part of a larger nomadic conflict between the Nogais who were clients of the Ottoman Porte and the Russian-sponsored Zaporizhian Cossacks. In the late 18th century, Imperial Russia under Catherine the Great began to expand into the area. As a result of the Russo-Turkish War of 1768-1774, the Ottomans ceded to Russia the region east of the Southern Bug.

Through the 1792 Treaty of Jassy (Iaşi) which concluded the Russo-Turkish War of 1787-1792, the Russian frontier was extended to the Dniester River and the takeover of Yedisan was complete. Following the Russian takeover, the city of Odesa was founded in 1794 and the area was settled as part of New Russia by Moldavian, Russian and Ukrainian colonists along with a significant German element. The area came to form parts of the Kherson Governorate and is nowadays part of the Ukrainian Odesa and Mykolaiv oblasts, and of the southern breakaway Transnistria (de jure part of Moldova).

== Sanjak-beys ==
- 1669–1676 Petro Doroshenko
- 1678–1681 Yuriy Khmelnytsky
- 1681–1684 George Ducas
- 1684–1685 Teodor Sulymenko
- 1685–1685 Yakym Samchenko
- 1685–1685 Yuriy Khmelnytsky
- 1685–1695 Stepan Lozynsky
- 1695–1698 Ivan Bahaty
- 1698–1711 Petro Ivanenko
- 1711–1742 Pylyp Orlyk (de-facto)
- 1765–1783 Jakub Rudzevych

== See also ==
- Black Sea Cossack Host
- Danubian Sich

== Sources ==
- Sapozhnikov, I. Zaporizhian Cossacks of the Ochakiv region and Ottoman Ukraine during the "Crimean protection" (1711–1734). History of Cossacks portal.
- Hrybovsky, V. Ottoman Ukraine. The Ukrainian Week. August 7, 2009
