= Siege of Uman (1674) =

- Part of the Russo-Turkish War (1672–1681) and Ottoman-Cossack Conflict
Date	August–September 1674
Location	Uman, Right-bank Ukraine
Result	Ottoman victory
Territorial changes	Capture of Uman by the Ottomans

Belligerents
Cossack Hetmanate	Ottoman Empire

Commanders and leaders
(Cossack Hetmanate) Stepan Yavorsky (POW)	(Ottoman Empire) Kara Mustafa Pasha (Ottoman Empire) Kigay † (Ottoman Empire) Chorbay †

Strength
Unknown	20,000 men 30 cannons

Casualties and losses
Heavy	Heavy
- Entire civilian population killed or taken captive

The siege of Uman or defence of Uman was a siege of the city of Uman conducted by the Ottoman grand vizier Kara Mustafa Pasha against the Cossack garrison in the city led by colonel Stepan Yavorsky during the 1674 campaign of Romodanovsky and Samoylovych. The city was eventually captured and sacked.

== Background ==
In the march of 1674, joint Russian and Cossack army invaded the right-bank Ukraine, which was at the time an Ottoman protectorate under the rule of Petro Doroshenko. Allied army captured most of the region and as a result, Samoylovych was proclaimed as a hetman of right-bank Ukraine by ten regiments, including the Uman regiment. In July, the Cossack-Russian army besieged the Doroshenko's capital – Chyhyryn. To help his ally, Ottoman sultan Mehmed IV sent an army to the right bank. At the end of July, the Ottoman army entered Ukraine and fought the Cossacks at Ladyzhyn, with initial attack being was repelled, but after a several days-long siege, the city surrendered. Romodanovsky and Samoylovych, finding out about the approaching Ottoman army withdrew beyond the Dnieper, leaving the Cossack garrisons in the Right-bank Ukraine without any support.

== Siege ==
In August, the Ottoman army with a total strength of approximately 20,000 men besieged the city. Locals sent letters to the left-bank Hetman Ivan Samoilovich and Grigory Romodanovsky asking for help, but without any consequences. Ottoman army launched several assaults but all of them were repelled by the Cossacks, causing a heavy casualties among the Turks. However, once the Uman colonel Stepan Yavorsky was captured, Ottoman army launched another series of assaults that led to an eventual fall of Uman.

== Aftermath ==
Uman was destroyed and most of its inhabitants were either killed or captured by the Turks while some managed to escape to the Left-bank. Despite the victory, Ottoman army suffered heavy losses and was forced to abandon their plans of capturing Kiev. Ottomans have also lost two of their commanders during the siege, Kigay and Chorbay.
