= Pryinhulskyi Regional Landscape Park =

Protected area in Mykolaiv Oblast, Ukraine

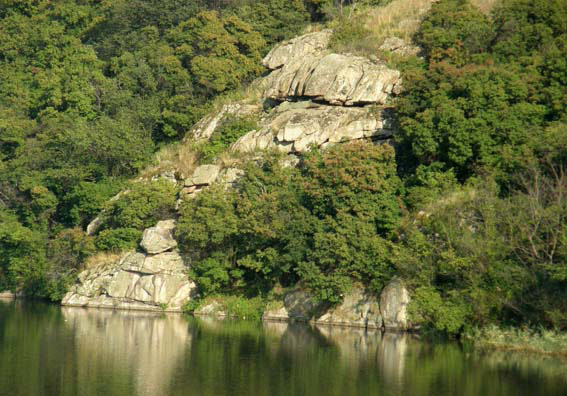
- Interactive map of Pryinhulskyi Regional Landscape Park
- Location: Mykolaiv Oblast, Ukraine
- Nearest city: Kryvyi Rih
- Coordinates: 47°41′06″N 32°23′00″E
- Area: 31,527 ha (77,900 acres)
- Established: December 17th, 2002
- Website: Official website

Pryinhulskyi Regional Landscape Park is a regional landscape park in Mykolaiv Oblast of Ukraine.

Pryinhulskyi Regional Landscape Park is an object of Nature Reserve Fund of Ukraine. The park was established by the decision of the Mykolaiv regional council on the territory of 3,152.7 ha on December 17, 2002.

== Location ==
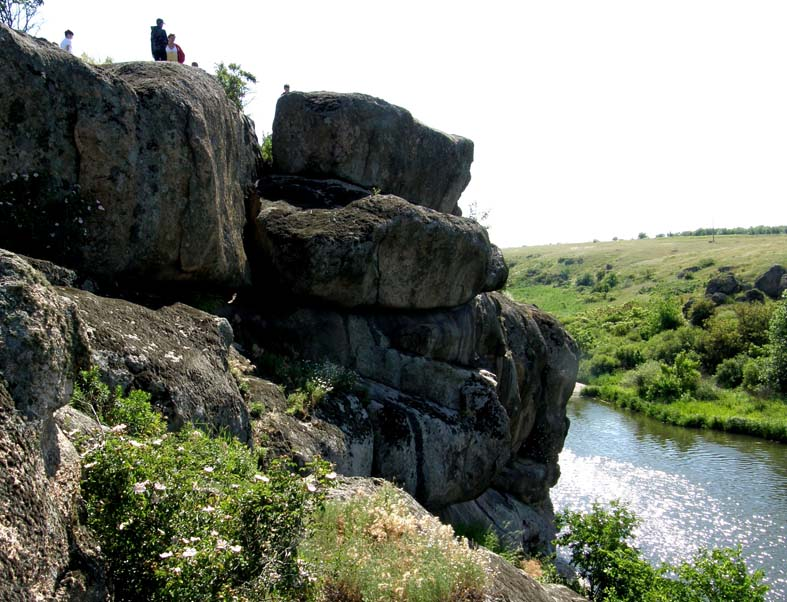

Pryinhulskyi Regional Landscape Park is located in the valley of Inhul river on the territory of local councils of Novyi Buh town and Kamianka, Sofiivka, Rozanivka villages in Novy Buh area of Mykolaiv Oblast, not far from Novyi Buh town in the direction of Sofiivka village. The nearest cities are Kryvyi Rih – 80 km, Kropyvnytskyi – 85 km, Mykolaiv – 95 km.

== General information ==
=== Main purpose ===
The main purpose is preservation of the area of Inhul river valley with its typical and unique natural complexes (fragments of virgin steppe, granite outcrops, waterways and forest plantations).

=== Goals ===
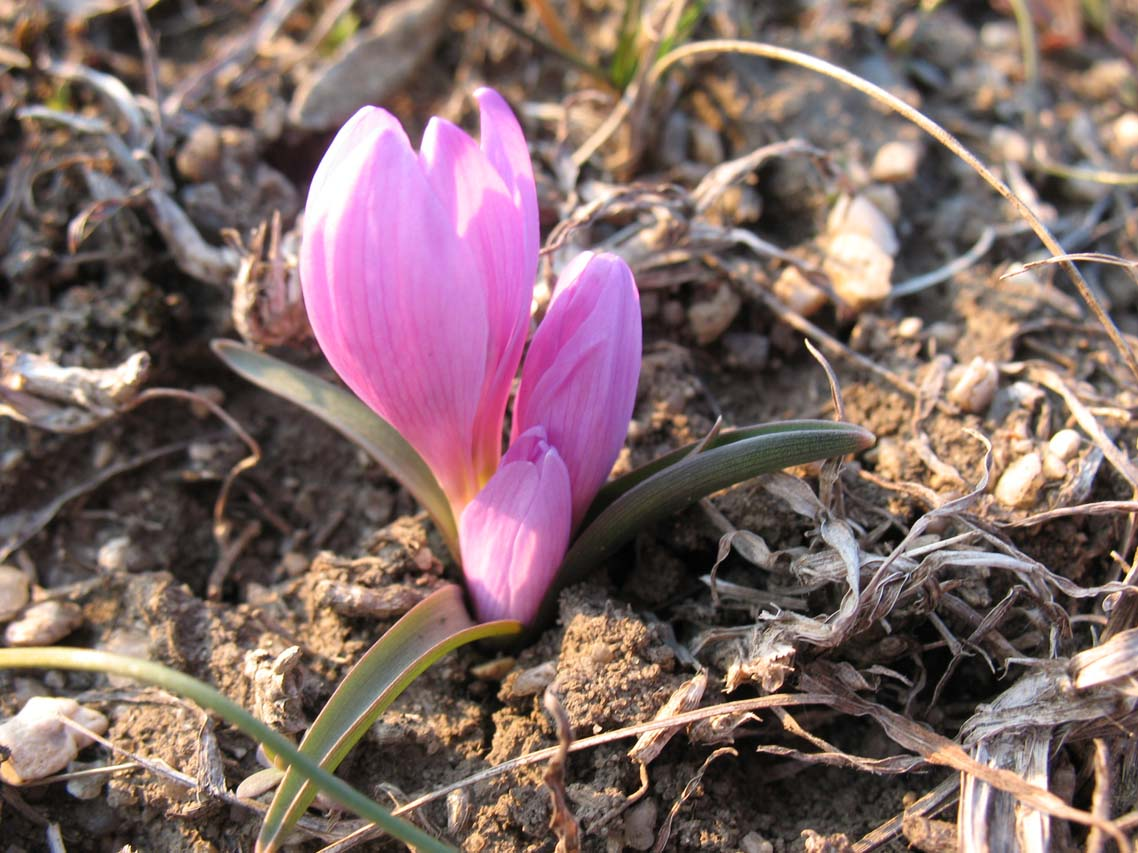

The main goals are the following:

- preservation and restoration of natural complexes and their flora and fauna;
- creation of favourable conditions for tourism and recreation;
- scientific researching;
- ecological educational work.

=== Structure ===
The territory of park includes hydrological nature reserve "Sofiivskyi storage pond" and botanical nature reserve "Pelaheivskyi"

=== Directorate ===
Special administration (directorate) of the park was founded in 2007, it is situated in Sofiivka village of Bashtanka Raion.

== Ecosystem of the park ==
=== Relief ===
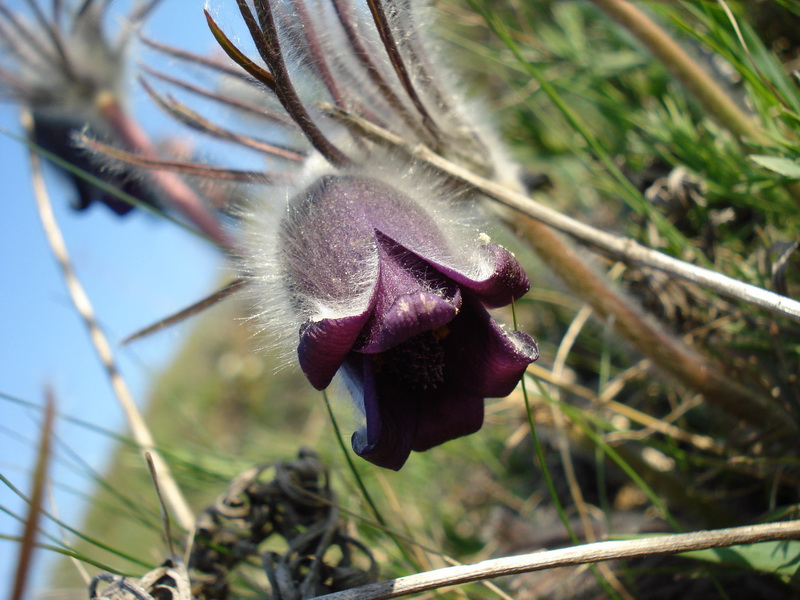

The park is located on the southern-eastern area of the Ingul block of the Ukrainian crystalline shield. Here limestones, clays and sands lie on Precambrian formations – gneisses and granites which outcrop in some places along the valleys of the river Ingul and its feeders the Sagaydak and the Berezivka creating unique attractive landscapes, the isotopic age of which is determined by geologists to be 1.8-2.2 billion of years.

The most picturesque outcrops of the crystalline rocks have their own names. Several legends were composed about them e.g. about the rocks above the Inhul river - "Eagle-owl", "Pillar" (or "Stone strongmen rock"), "Sleeping beauty", "Wall" or simply "Ustia" (lit. 'estuary') near the estuary of the Berezivka river where it inflows into the Inhul river. To the south from Rozanivka v. there is another one "Wall" or "Raven rock", where a couple of ravens nests since olden times. There are also two "Eagle-owls" – "Old" and "Young" ones - here, as well as granite outcrops - "The coast of stone chimeras" and the granite plateau in the place of junction of the rivers Stovpova and Inhul, called "Devil's bridge" etc.

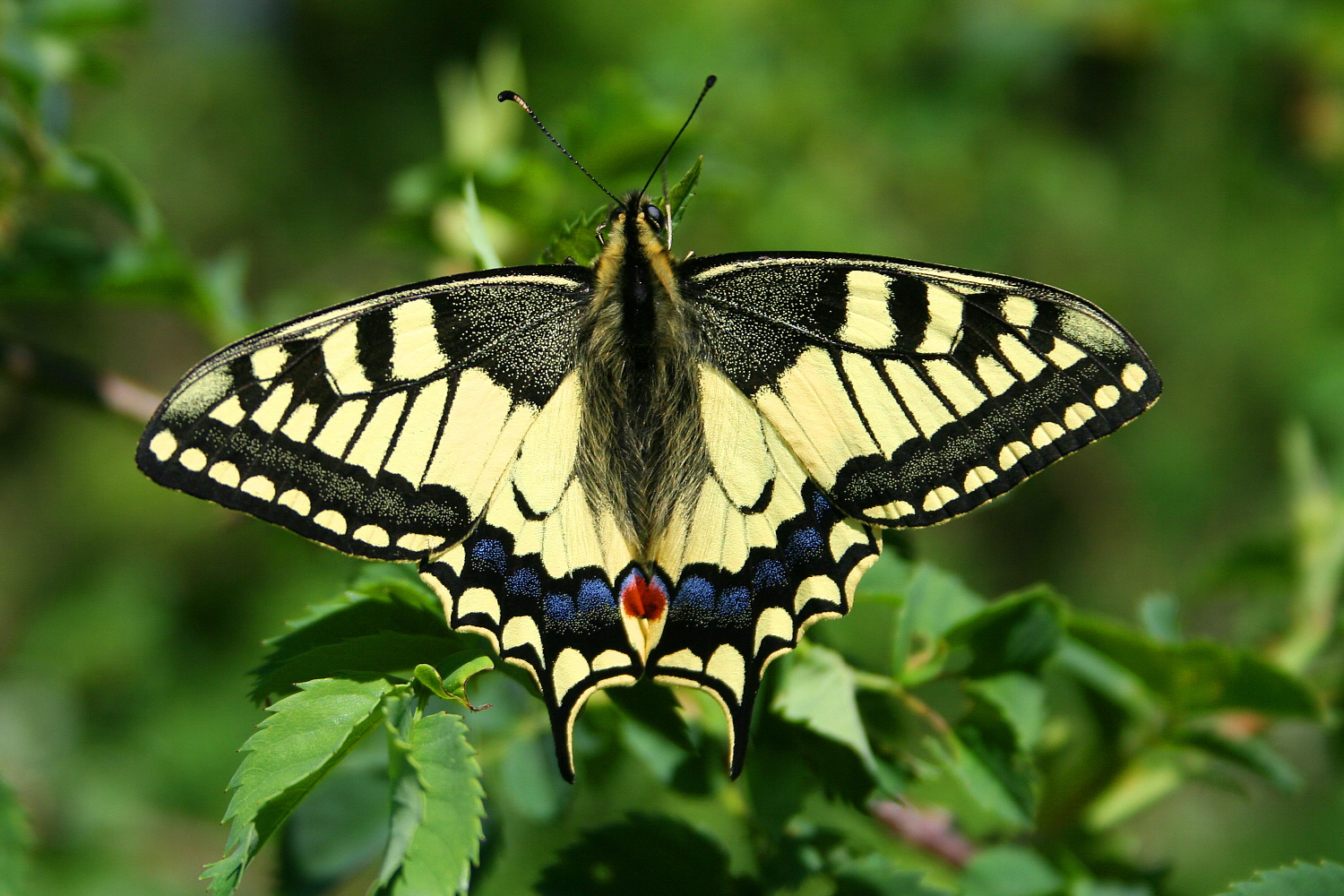

=== Flora ===
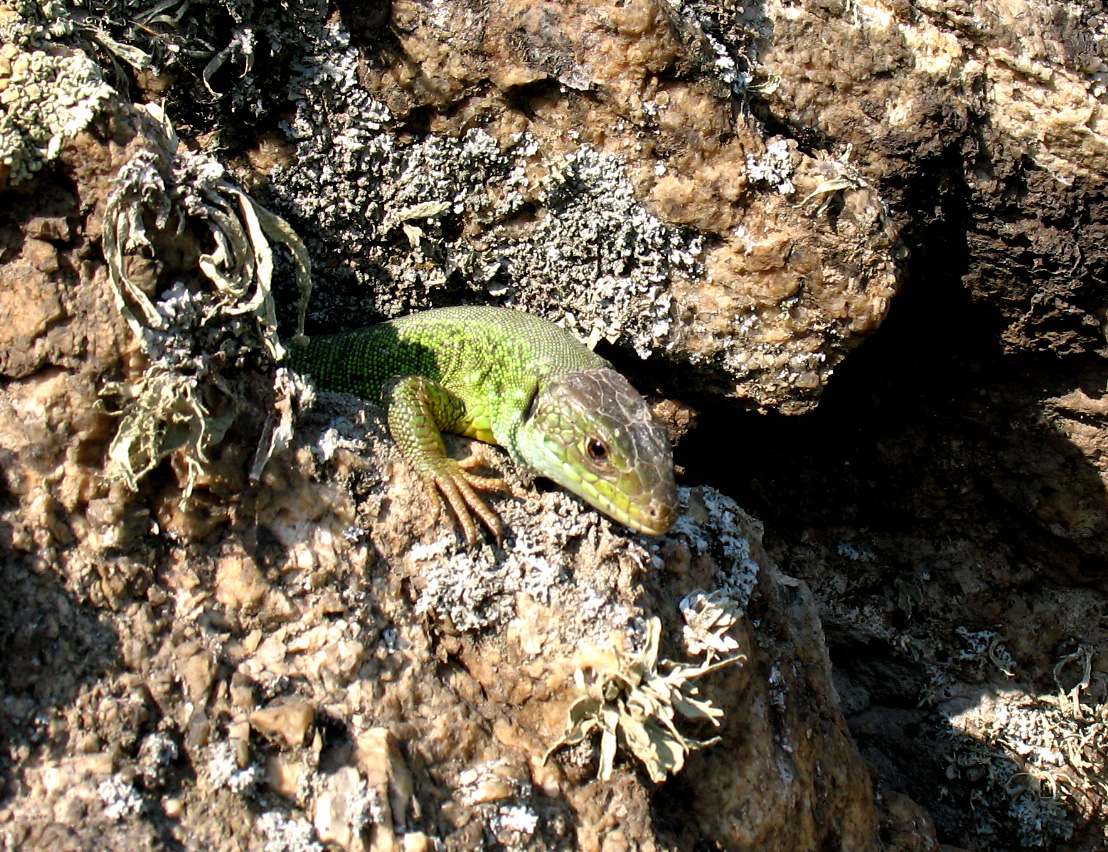

Flora of Inhul River Park numbers about 600 species of plants, including 20 species listed in the Red Book of Ukraine (according to the second edition of the Red Book of Ukraine), four species listed in the European Red List of Threatened Species, five species included in the World Red List of Threatened Species, one species included in the list of Convention on the Conservation of European Wildlife and Natural Habitats, 12 species included in the Regional list of preservation of Mykolaiv region.

Here, in addition to the typical steppe, meadow-steppe, meadow, forest and rock species there are many Southern Buh coast and Black Sea coast endemics such as Caragana Scythian (Caragana scythica), Greenweed Scythian (Genista scythica), Milk Vetch of Odesa (Astragalus odessana) as well as relict, rare and endangered species of unique phytogenofond. For example, several clumps of relict species Gymnospermium odessanum were found here in recent two years.

In spring various landscape formations are wonderfully decorated with [Potentilla arenaria], [Aurinia saxatilis], several species of violets, Corydalis solida, Scilla bifolia, Tulipa hypanica, Iris humilis and in summer – with the rainbow mosaic of the motley grass steppe. In autumn the slopes turn red with fruits of hawthorn (Crataegus) and dog rose (Rosa canina), with leaves of gatten-tree (Euonymus europaeus) and barberry (Berberis vulgaris); they turn motley with apricot and ash tree colour gamma. Great amount of medicinal plants also attracts. Majestic stone scatterings are adorned with mosses and lichens from early spring till late autumn.

Only on the territory of RLP, in Tchorsivsky park, in the former estate of the Tropinins you can see aged European ashes (Fraxinus excelsior), elm trees (Ulmus laevis), black locusts (Gleditschia triacanthos) and embrace three together centennial black poplars (Populus nigra).

=== Fauna ===
Intensive anthropogenic activity has also impacted the fauna of Pryingulsky RLP. Cattle pasture, recreational loads, amateur fishery, poaching in the area of Sofiivske water reservoir, steppe and forest fire deplete the fauna of RLP, which, however, is much better preserved than in the bordering agrolandscapes.

The list of rare and threatened species being under protection of the State includes Southern Festoon (Zerynthia polyxena), Old World Swallowtail (Papilio machaon), Mammoth Wasp (Scolia maculata), Carpenter Bee (Xylocopa valga), Large Whip Snake (Coluber jugularis), Long-legged Buzzard (Buteo rufinus), Stoat or Ermine (Mustela erminea), Steppe Polecat (Mustela eversmanii) etc.

== Historic sites ==
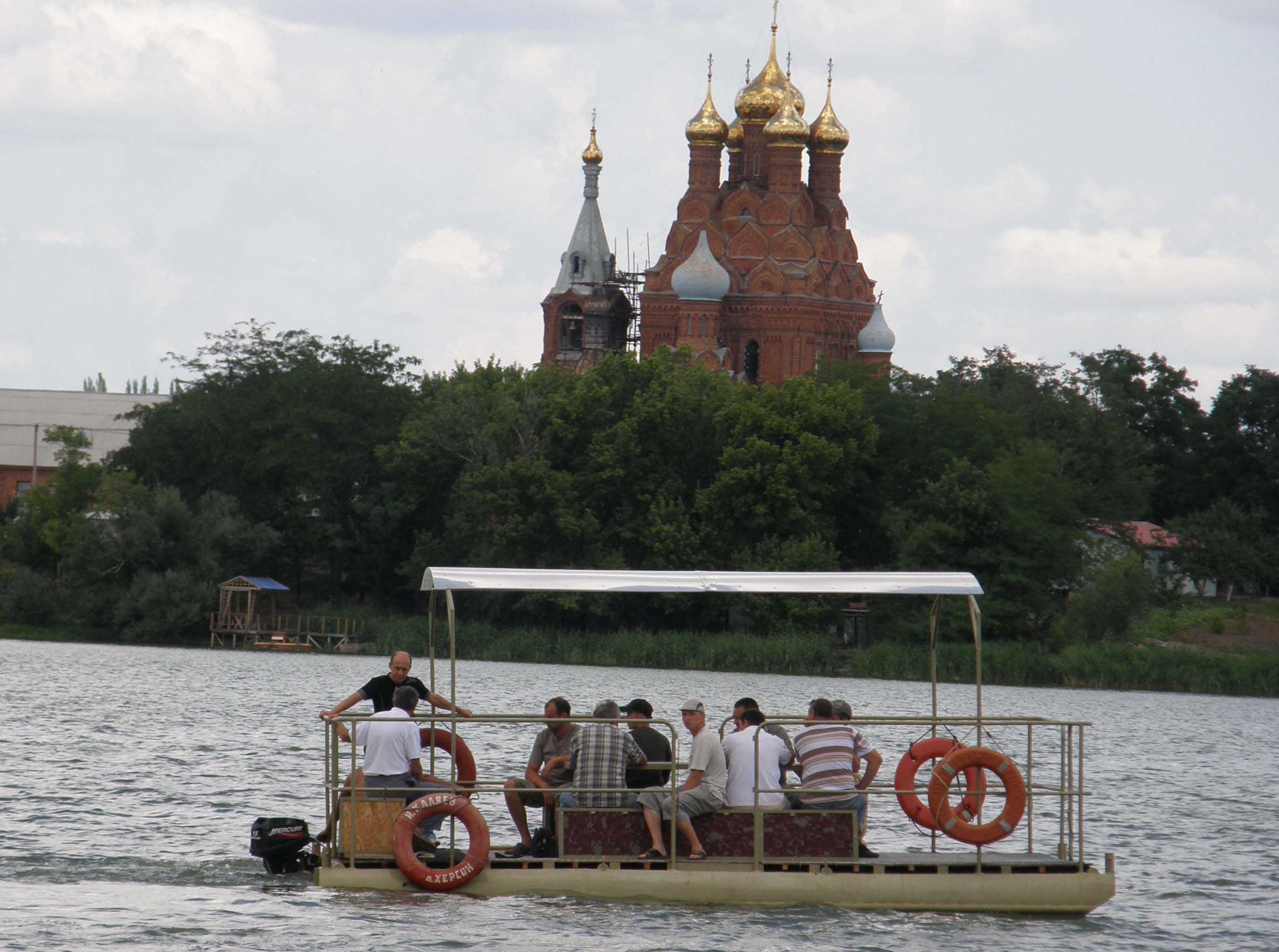

The St. Michael Church of the St. Michael Convent is situated here.
