= Zhuravne settlement hromada =

Hromada in Lviv Oblast, Ukraine

Zhuravno settlement hromada Журавненська селищна громада
- Hromada
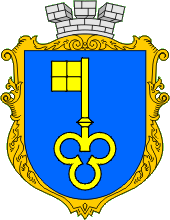
- Seal
- Interactive map of Zhuravno settlement hromada
- Country: Ukraine
- Oblast: Lviv Oblast
- Raion: Stryi Raion
- Admin. center: Zhuravno

Area
  - Total: 2,791 km^{2} (1,078 sq mi)

Population (2021)
  - Total: 11,767
  - Density: 4.216/km^{2} (10.92/sq mi)
- Settlements: 27
- Rural settlements: 1
- Villages: 26
- Website: zhuravnenska-gromada.gov.ua

Zhuravno settlement hromada (Ukrainian: Журавненська селищна громада) is a hromada in Ukraine, in Stryi Raion of Lviv Oblast. The administrative center is the rural settlement of Zhuravno.

== Settlements ==
The hromada consists of 1 rural settlement (Zhuravno) and 26 villages:

- Antonivka
- Buianiv
- Volodymyrtsi
- Demivka
- Dubravka
- Zahrabivka
- Zarichne
- Korchivka
- Kotoryny
- Krekhiv
- Lyskiv
- Liubsha
- Liutynka
- Mazurivka
- Marynka
- Melnych
- Monastyrets
- Novoshyny
- Podorozhnie
- Protesy
- Romanivka
- Sydorivka
- Stare Selo
- Suliatychi
- Ternavka
- Chertizh
