= Antonivka, Lviv Oblast =

Village in Lviv Oblast, Ukraine

Antonivka Антонівка Antoniówka
- Village
- Location within Lviv Oblast Location within Ukraine
- Coordinates: 49°16′27″N 24°11′23″E
- Country: Ukraine
- Oblast: Lviv
- Raion: Stryi Raion

Area
  - Total: 1.37 km^{2} (0.53 sq mi)
- Elevation /(average value of): 256 m (840 ft)

Population (2021)
  - Total: 379
  - Density: 277/km^{2} (717/sq mi)
- Time zone: UTC+2 (EET)
  - Summer (DST): UTC+3 (EEST)
- Postal code: 81776
- Area code: +380 3239

Antonivka (Ukrainian: Антонівка, Polish: Antoniówka) is a village (selo) in Stryi Raion, Lviv Oblast, in western Ukraine. It belongs to Zhuravne settlement hromada, one of the hromadas of Ukraine.

== History ==
Antonivka was mentioned as Jajkowce in the 16th century. The name is derived from the patronymic Polish name Jajko / Jejko, which jajko means egg, (Ukrainian: Яйце). Later, it was renamed Jajkowze (Яйковцӗ) or Jajkiwzi (Яйківці) in Ukrainian.

During the First Partition of Poland in 1772, the village became part of the new Kingdom of Galicia and Lodomeria of the Habsburg monarchy. In 1900, the Jajkowce parish had 84 houses with 548 inhabitants, of which 504 were Ruthenian speakers, 44 were Polish speakers, 485 were Greek-Catholics, 44 were Roman-Catholics, and 19 were Jews.

During World War II, Antonivka first belonged to the Soviet Union and from 1941 to the General Government, from 1945 again to the Ukrainian SSR. Shortly afterward, Most Poles left the village in 1946.

Until 18 July 2020, Antonivka belonged to Zhydachiv Raion. The raion was abolished in July 2020 as part of the administrative reform of Ukraine, which reduced the number of raions of Lviv Oblast to seven. The area of Zhydachiv Raion was merged into Stryi Raion.

== Demographics ==
According to the 2001 population census, 545 people lived in the village. The linguistic composition of the population of Antonivka was as follows:

Language	Percentage
Ukrainian	99.08 %
Russian	0.55 %
Moldovan (Romanian)	0.18 %
