= Zhuravno =

Rural locality in Lviv Oblast, Ukraine

Zhuravno Журавно
- Rural settlement
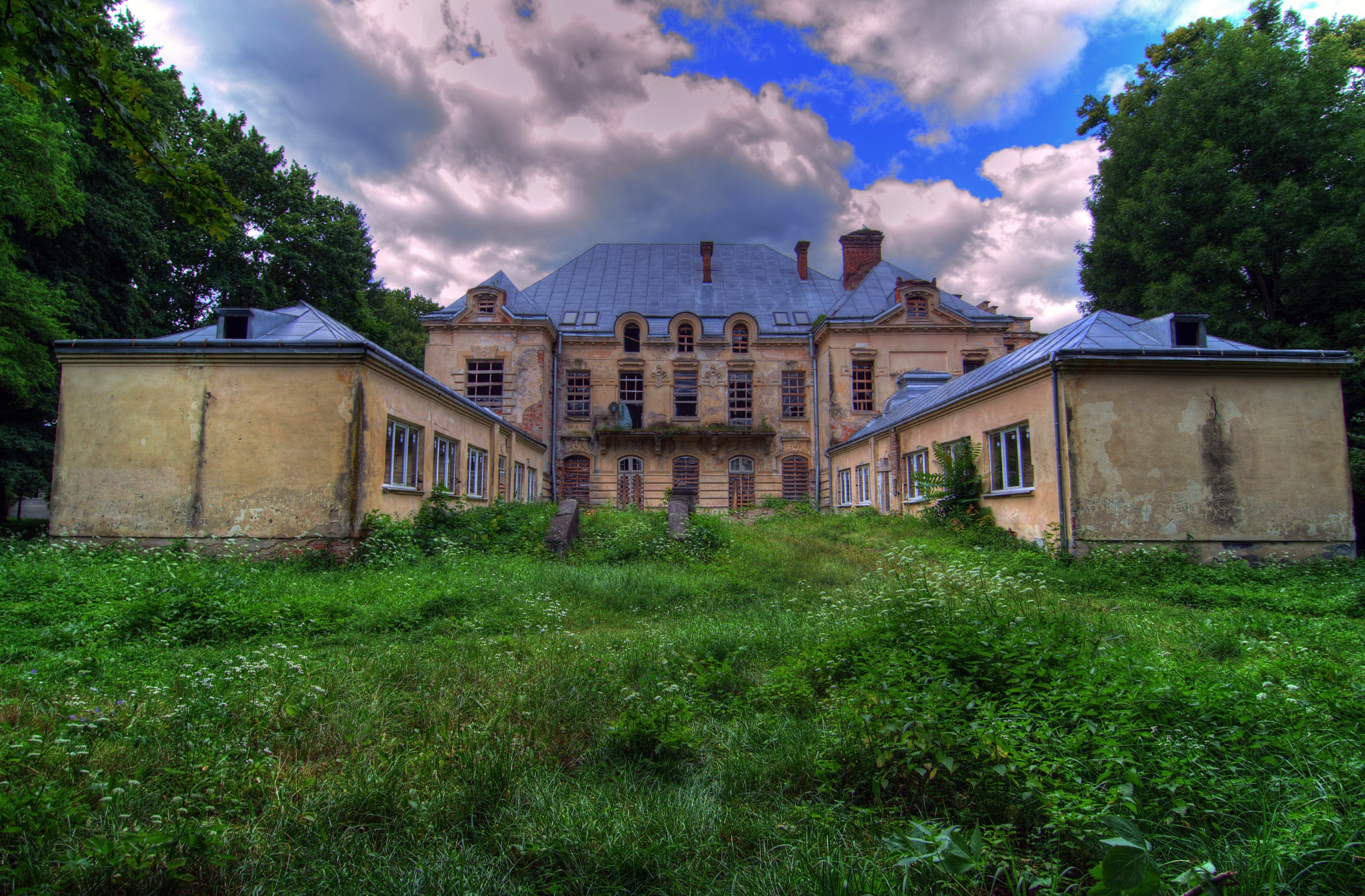
- Czartoryski palace

- Coat of arms

- Location within Lviv Oblast Location within Ukraine
- Coordinates: 49.258°N 24.286°E
- Country: Ukraine
- Oblast: Lviv Oblast
- Raion: Stryi Raion
- Hromada: Zhuravne settlement hromada
- Founded: 1435
- City rights: 1563

Area
  - Total: 45.3 km^{2} (17.5 sq mi)

Population (2022)
  - Total: 3,302
  - Density: 81/km^{2} (210/sq mi)
- Postal code: 81780, 81781
- Area code: +380-3239

Zhuravno (Ukrainian: Журавно; Polish: Żurawno; Yiddish: זשיראוונע, Zhirovne) is a rural settlement in Stryi Raion, Lviv Oblast of western Ukraine. It hosts the administration of Zhuravne settlement hromada, one of the hromadas of Ukraine. Population: 3,302 (2022 estimate), 2,968 (2025 estimate).

== Geography ==
Zhuravno is located on the right bank of the Dniester, near the mouth of river Svicha.

== History ==
The town was first mentioned in 1435. In the 16th century, Zhuravno was granted city status. Prior to World War II the town was located in Poland.

Zhuravno gained recognition in Polish history because of the battle which took place nearby between the king of Poland, John III Sobieski, and the Turkish and Tatar invaders, a battle that ended in a peace treaty. The town was also the birthplace of the renowned Polish poet and author Mikołaj Rej in 1505.

After a battle between troops of Polish king Jan Sobieski and the Ottomans in 1676, on 17 October of the same year a treaty was signed in the town, alleviating conditions of the Treaty of Buchach for the Polish side.

The German forces occupied the territory in early July 1941. From the beginning of September to November 1942, the majority of Zhuravno's Jews were deported to the Belzec extermination camp. About 160 Jewish specialists were purposefully left and confined to an open ghetto. In February and June 1943, they were murdered during two mass executions on the outskirts of the village carried out by German Gendarmerie and Ukrainian local police.

Under the Soviet rule, Zhuravno served as a district centre of Drohobych Oblast.

Until 18 July 2020, Zhuravno belonged to Zhydachiv Raion. The raion was abolished in July 2020 as part of the administrative reform of Ukraine, which reduced the number of raions of Lviv Oblast to seven. The area of Zhydachiv Raion was merged into Stryi Raion.

Until 26 January 2024, Zhuravno was designated urban-type settlement. On this day, a new law entered into force which abolished this status, and Zhuravno became a rural settlement.

== Economy ==
Sources of natural gas production are located in the area.
