= Chyhyryn campaign (1674) =

1674 Russian-Cossack siege

- Part of the right-bank campaign (1674), Russo-Turkish War and the Ruin
Date	23 July – 9 August 1674
Location	Chyhyryn, right-bank Ukraine
Result	Ottoman–Tatar–Cossack victory

Belligerents
Ottoman Empire; Crimean Khanate; Right-Bank Hetmanate	Tsardom of Russia; Left-Bank Hetmanate; Kabardia (East Circassia)

Commanders and leaders
(Ottoman Empire) Kara Mustafa Pasha; Dżambet Garej; Petro Doroshenko	Grigory Romodanovsky; Ivan Samoylovych

Strength
(Ottoman Empire) 30,000–40,000; 7,500	11,463 (Note: 22,800 troops (11,463 combat-ready)); 15,000–20,000

The Chyhyryn campaign or Chigirin campaign was an unsuccessful siege conducted by the Russian-Cossack forces in order to oust Petro Doroshenko from power, along with Ottoman–Crimean forces on his side.

== Prelude ==
On June 9, Doroshenko attempted to ambush the Cossack-Russian forces during their campaign. However, Doroshenko's Cossack–Tatar detachment was defeated and he fled to Chyhyryn. Doroshenko was now at risk of being decisively defeated and captured in his fortress, so he had to ask Mehmed IV for military support, but Ottoman army could only arrive later. On July 20, Russian-Cossack forces crossed the Dnieper and headed for Chyhyryn. Sultan was informed of this and forced to divert his forces from operations in Poland to assist Doroshenko.

== Campaign ==
On July 23, Russian–Cossack forces besieged Chyhyryn. Doroshenko attempted counterattack, which was unsuccessful. However, the Russian army was in poor shape, only 11,463 Russian troops were combat-ready. There were 15,000-20,000 left-bank Cossacks.

On July 26, Russian troops shelled Chyhyryn. However, there was a lack of large-caliber artillery so it wasn't possible to demolish the fortress. Grigory Romodanovsky chose to blockade the fortress as an alternative. On July 28, Doroshenko was sent an offer to capitulate, which he rejected. On July 29-30, Ottoman army headed to Uman.

During August 7-9, Ottoman forces fought with Ladyzhyn garrison, which eventually came under Ottoman control and the settlement was sacked. Russian-Cossack forces learnt about the approach of main Ottoman army, so they were forced to abandon their plans and retreat.

== Aftermath ==
The Ottoman-led army forced the Russian–Cossack forces to lift the siege of Chyhyryn with their actions. On August 12, main Cossack-Russian forces retreated to Cherkasy. On August 14, Cossack–Tatar forces pursued them there, but didn't make large-scale assaults and withdrew the same day. On August 25, Ottoman-Crimean army captured Uman. However, on August 29, Ottoman-Crimean forces made a decision not to make further advances. Ottoman-Crimean army ravaged settlements on the way back.
