= Battles of Ladyzhyn (1674) =

- Part of the Russo-Turkish War (1672–1681) and Ottoman-Cossack Conflict
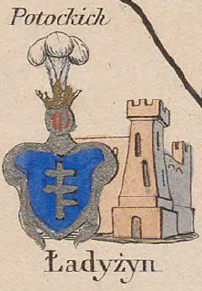
- Ladyzhyn on the map of Zygmunt Gerstmann
Date	31 July; 5–9 (12) August 1674
Location	Ladyzhyn, Right-bank Ukraine, Cossack Hetmanate
Result	First battle: Cossack victory Second battle: Ottoman victory
Territorial changes	Ladyzhyn captured by the Ottoman Empire

Belligerents
Cossack Hetmanate	Ottoman Empire

Commanders and leaders
(Cossack Hetmanate) Anastas Dmytriiv (POW) (Cossack Hetmanate) Vojca Serbin (AWOL) (Cossack Hetmanate) Andriy Murashko (executed)	(Ottoman Empire) Kara Mustafa Pasha

Strength
2,000 to 5,000 men (Note: City garrison)	First battle: 4,000 men Second battle: Unknown but more than the Cossacks (Note: Some estimates put the number of the Turkish troops as high as 150 thousand)

Casualties and losses
Heavy	Over 20,000 casualties
- Entire civilian population killed or taken captive

The battles of Ladyzhyn or defence of Ladyzhyn (Ukrainian: Ладижинська оборона) were two battles over the city of Ladyzhyn in the Right-bank Ukraine between the Ottoman troops and the Cossacks who pledged their loyalty to Ivan Samoylovych as a part of the ongoing Russo-Turkish war. The Cossacks initially defeated a 4000-strong Ottoman army near Ladyzhyn on 31 of July but on 5 of August the new Ottoman army led by grand vizier Kara Mustafa Pasha besieged Ladyzhyn and captured it.

== Background ==
In January 1674, the joint Russo-Cossack army led by prince Grigory Romodanovsky and hetman of Left-bank Ukraine Ivan Samoylovych invaded the Right-bank, leading to all of its regiments excluding the Chyhyryn regiment which kept its loyalty to Doroshenko, and the pro-Polish hetman Khanenko recognising the Russian sovereignty over Right-bank in March 1674. In July, Romodanovsky's army besieged the Doroshenko's capital – Chyhyryn. At the same time, Polish forces led by John Sobieski launched their own offensive against the Ottomans. The Polish-Lithuanian forces clashed with the pro-Samoylovych Cossacks in Podolia. The Ottoman sultan reacted quickly, sending a large army to Ukraine in order to help the besieged Doroshenko. At the end of June-beginning of July, Tatar forces invaded Ukraine and captured the town of Kosnytsia. At the end of July, the Ottoman-Tatar army crossed the Dniester, while the forces led by Mehmed-Pasha captured the city of Vinnytsia.

== Battles ==
=== First battle ===
On 31 of July, the 4000-strong Ottoman army approached the city of Ladyzhyn. Cossacks led by colonel Serbin were sent to unite with the forces of Murashka and Anastas Dmytriiv, who had raided Moldavia before returning to Ladyzhyn. They countered the Ottoman army and fought a battle against it, which resulted in a Cossack victory. The Turks suffered heavy losses, some of them were captured by the Cossacks and informed them about upcoming larger Ottoman army. The Cossacks decided to retreat from Ladyzhyn before the new Ottoman army approaches but were stopped by the locals who were against this.

=== Second battle and siege ===
On 2 of August, the Ottoman army once again approached Ladyzhyn and besieged it on 5 of August. The city was set on fire by the Ottoman cannons which followed by a series of assaults. Although the assaults were repelled, Serbin left the city after a day of siege. Murashko, meanwhile, surrendered to the Ottomans. Despite the initial failures of the Ottoman assaults and heavy casualties among them, the remaining forced led by Anastas eventually surrendered on 9 of August (According to other source – on 11 or 12 of August).

== Aftermath ==
Ladyzhyn was destroyed and its inhabitants were either killed or took captive. Learning about the approaching Ottoman-led army, Romodanovsky and Samoylovych lifted the siege of Chyhyryn and retreated beyond the Dnieper. The Ottoman army continued its march on the Right-bank Ukraine and approached Uman, which was besieged since August. The Uman, despite strong resistance, was captured, although with heavy casualties. While the Ottoman campaign on the Right-bank overall succeeded, Mehmed IV was forced to abandon his plans of capturing Kiev. After the Ottoman-Crimean forces left the Right-bank Ukraine in autumn, the Polish-Lithuanian army led by John Sobieski renewed the fighting and besieged the city of Bar in November 1674.

== Bibliography ==
- Stepankov, Valerii (1991). Боротьба України і Польщі проти експансії Османської імперії у 1672 – 1676 рр (PDF).
