= Treaty of Żurawno =

1676 peace treaty between Poland-Lithuania and the Ottoman Empire

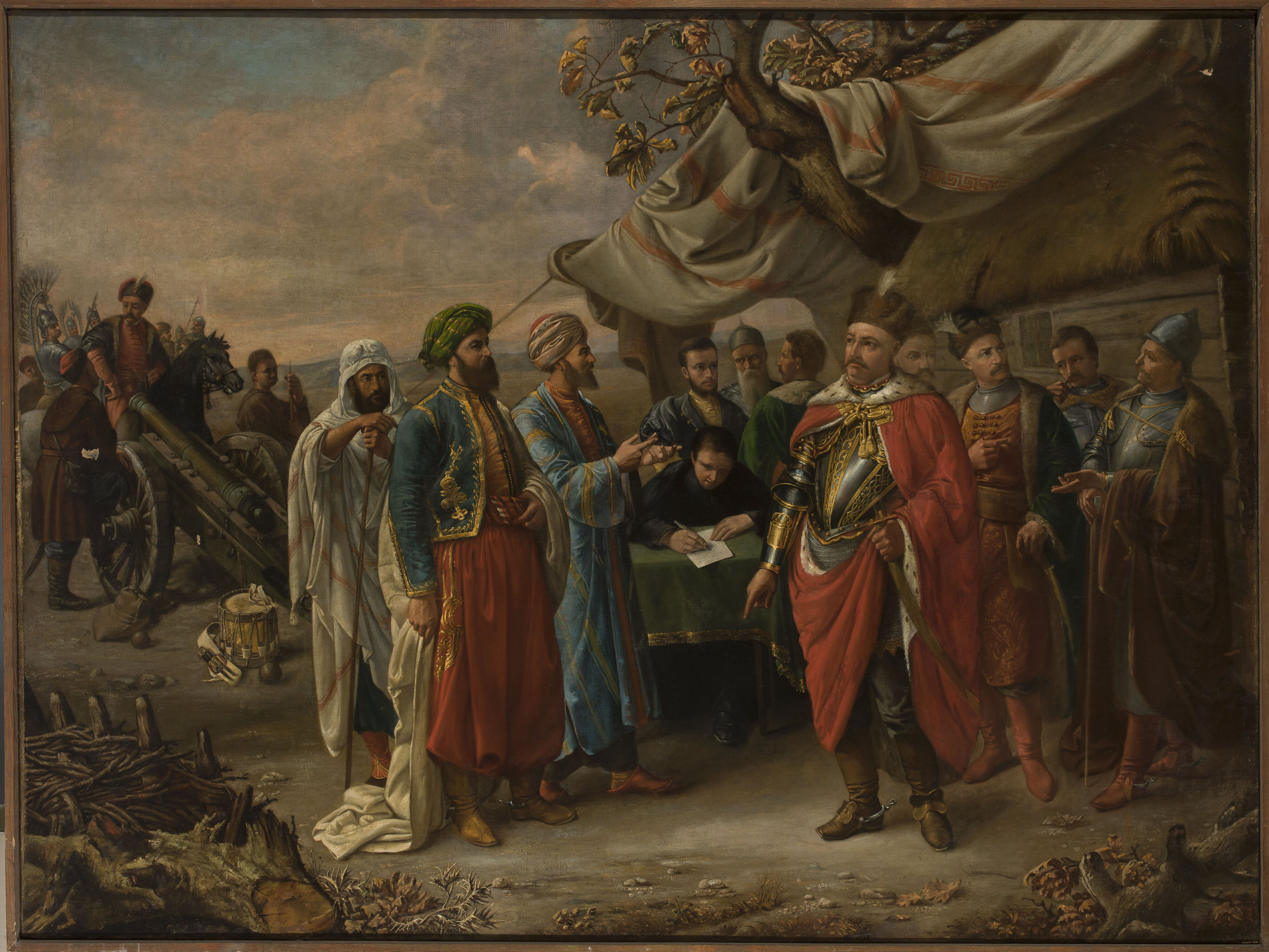
A painting by Roman Postemski titled "John III signs a treaty with the Turks in Żurawno"

The Treaty of Żurawno (Turkish: İzvança Antlaşması; Polish: rozejm w Żurawnie; Lithuanian: Žuravno taika) was signed on 17 October 1676 in the town of Zhuravno (Polish: Żurawno; Ottoman Turkish: İzvança), in the aftermath of the Battle of Żurawno.

The treaty, signed by the Polish–Lithuanian Commonwealth and the Ottoman Empire, ended the second phase of the Polish–Ottoman War (1672–76). It revised the 1672 Treaty of Buchach, and was more favorable to the Commonwealth, which no longer had to pay tribute, and regained about one third of the Ukrainian territories lost in the Buchach treaty. It also stipulated that the Lipka Tatars were to be given a free individual choice of whether they wanted to serve the Ottoman Empire or the Polish-Lithuanian Commonwealth.

In order to ratify the treaty, the Commonwealth sent to Istanbul Jan Gninski, the voivode of Chelmno Voivodeship. He stayed there in 1677–1678, but in the meantime, Polish Sejm refused to ratify the document. Soon afterwards, the Great Turkish War broke out. After the Treaty of Karlowitz, Podolia returned to Poland.
