= Treaty of Buchach =

1672 treaty between Poland-Lithuania and the Ottoman Empire

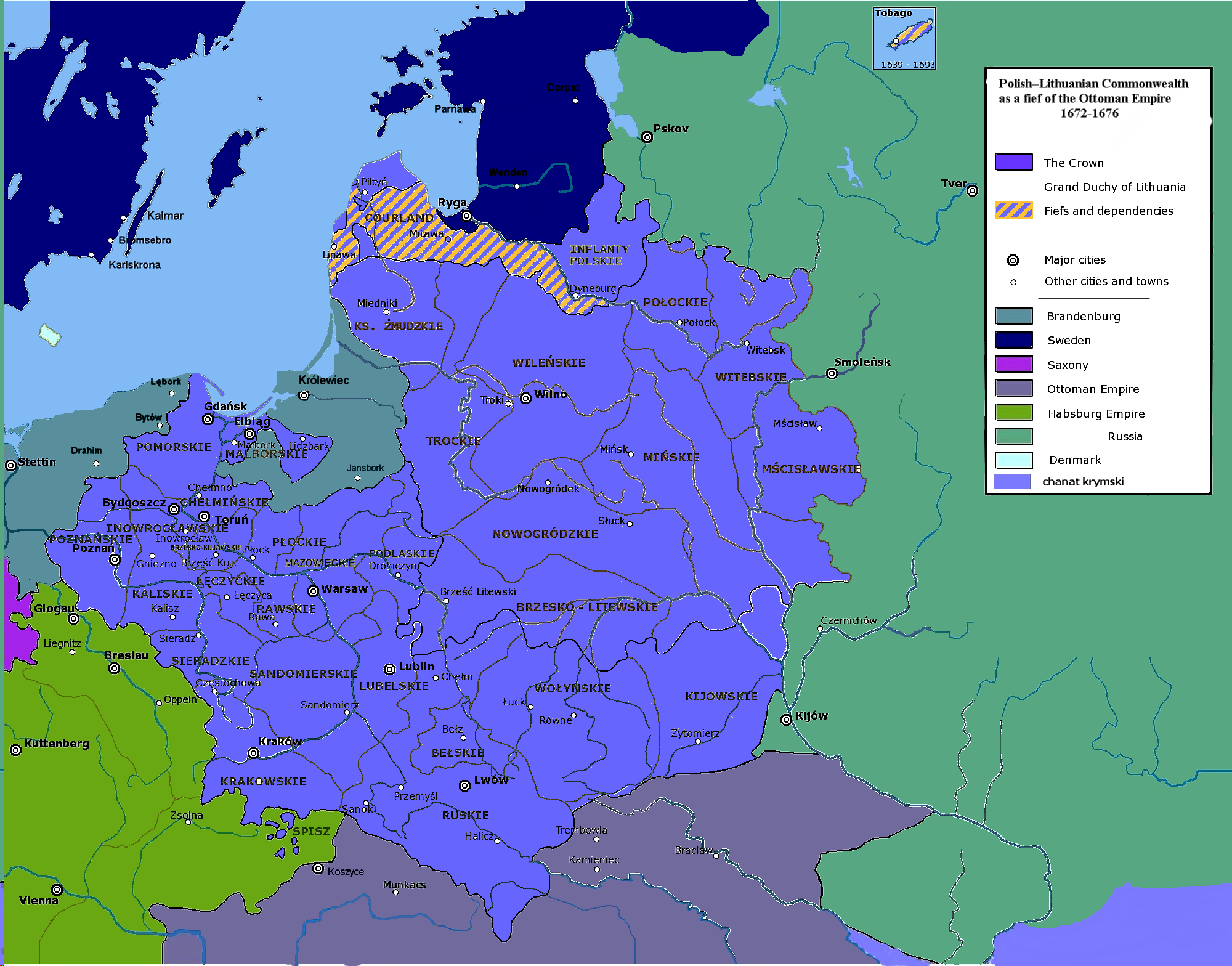
Polish–Lithuanian Commonwealth 1672–1676

The Treaty of Buchach was signed on 18 October 1672 in Buczacz (Buchach) between the Polish–Lithuanian Commonwealth under King Michał Korybut Wiśniowiecki, who had been unable to raise a suitable army, on the one side and the Ottoman Empire on the other side, ending the first phase of the Polish–Ottoman War (1672–1676).

Under the treaty Poland:

- ceded territory of Podolian Voivodeship to the Ottomans
- agreed to pay a yearly tribute of 22,000 thaler
- ceded territory of Bratslav Voivodeship and southern Kiev Voivodeship to the Cossack Hetmanate (Ottoman Ukraine), which fought alongside the Ottomans under Petro Doroshenko.

The hostilities would resume already in the spring of 1673 as the Sejm never ratified the treaty. In 1676, it was revised with the Treaty of Żurawno (today in Zhuravno, Stryi Raion).

== See also ==
- The Ruin (Ukrainian history)#List of treaties

== Bibliography ==
- Davies, Brian L (2007). Warfare, State and Society on the Black Sea Steppe, 1500–1700. London: Routledge. ISBN 9780415239851.
