= Right-bank campaign (1674) =

Cossack military action

The right-bank campaign
- Part of The Ruin (Ukrainian history)
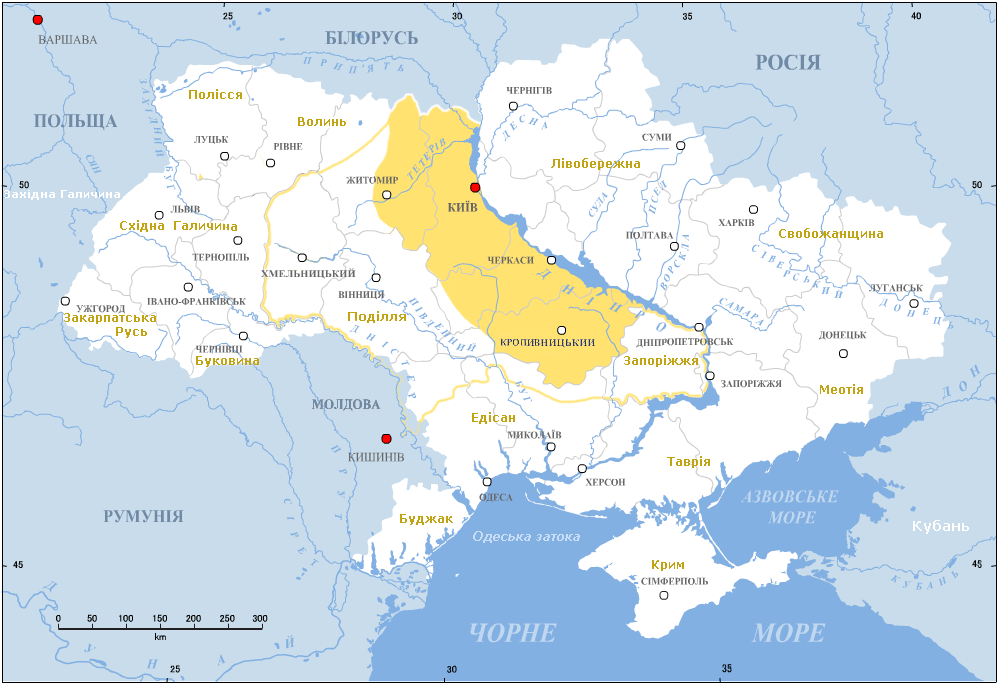
- Map of right-bank Ukraine
Date	1674
Location	Right-bank Ukraine, (modern day Ukraine)
Result	Cossack–Russian victory: (See Aftermath)

Belligerents
Right-bank Hetmanate; Ottoman Empire; Crimean Khanate	Left-bank Hetmanate; Russia

Commanders and leaders
Petro Doroshenko; Andrei Doroshenko (WIA) (Ottoman Empire) Kara Mustafa Pasha; Dżambet Garej	Ivan Samoylovych; Grigory Romodanovsky

The right-bank campaign of 1674 was the military actions of Moscow and Ukrainian troops under the leadership of the left-bank Hetman Ivan Samoilovych and Grigory Romodanovsky against the forces of the right-bank Hetman Petro Doroshenko, aimed at spreading royal power to right-bank Ukraine.

== Background ==
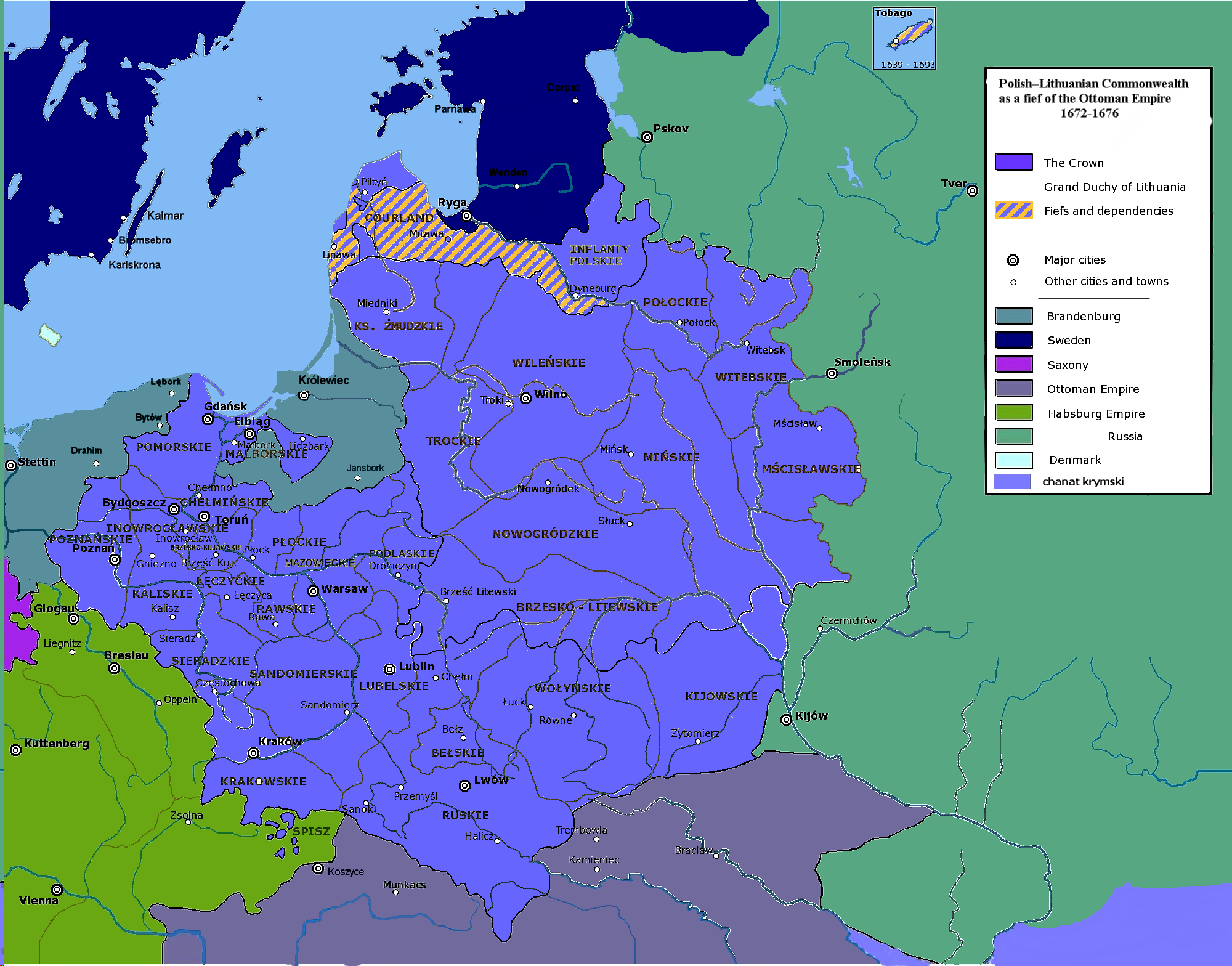
The Treaty of Buchach 1672

With the signing of the Treaty of Buchach in 1672, a Cossack state on the right bank of the Dnieper was recognised and Moscow sought to extend its influence there. Left-bank hetman Ivan Samoilovych was instructed to negotiate with right-bank hetman Petro Doroshenko for Moscow's protection, but he feared losing his power. Doroshenko was willing to accept Moscow's supremacy under certain conditions, including armed assistance and maintaining Cossack freedoms, but Moscow preferred having separate hetmans for each bank and refused to meet all of Doroshenko's demands. Over time, Moscow grew frustrated with Doroshenko's insistence on ceding territory for loyalty and, by 1674, felt ready to act against him, especially as support for Doroshenko had weakened among his allies. Samoilovych, fearing that he would be replaced as hetman by Doroshenko, saw this as a good opportunity to invade right-bank Ukraine.

== Campaign ==
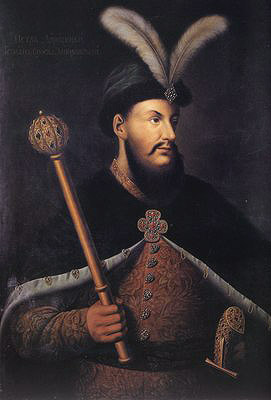
Hetman of right-bank Ukraine, Petro Doroshenko

At the beginning of 1674, Prince Romodanovski and the Hetman Samoylovich crossed to the right bank of the Dnieper. Doroshenko, having no forces, quickly lost Cherkasy, Kaniv and other towns. Soon after, Doroshenko's capital, Chyhyryn, was put under siege. But with the help of the Ottomans and the fact that Chyhyryn was well fortified Romodanovsky and Samoilovich decided to lift the siege and withdraw across the Dnieper. In the summer, Russian troops took further action and on June 19, 1674, in the battle on the Tashlyk River near Smila, they defeated the Cossack-Tatar troops led by Andrei Doroshenko (Petro's brother). The wounded Andrei fled to Chyhyryn. Right-bank Ukraine once again fell under Muscovite rule.

== Aftermath ==
With the end of the military campaign, Samoylovich returned, deputies of ten right-bank regiments came to the council in Pereyaslav and recognized Samoylovich as the hetman of the right-bank Ukraine.
