= Battle of Żurawno =

Battle in 1676

Coordinates: 49°15′N 24°14′E

- Part of Polish-Ottoman War (1672–1676)
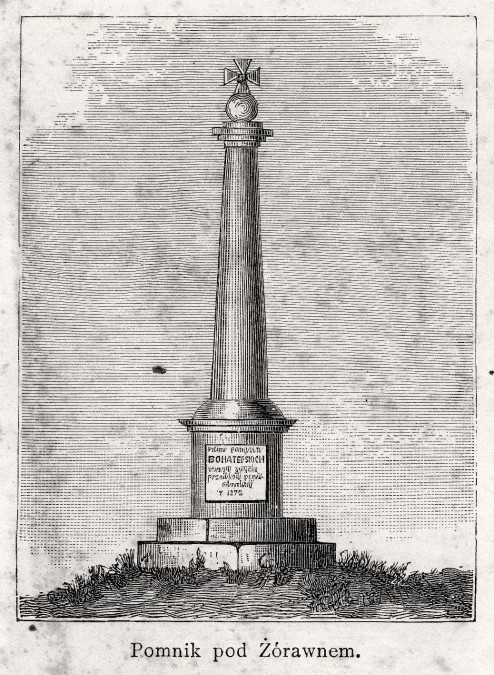
- Zurawno monument
Date	25 September – 14 October 1676
Location	Żurawno, Polish–Lithuanian Commonwealth (Present-day Zhuravno, Ukraine)
Result	See § Aftermath; Treaty of Żurawno

Belligerents
Poland-Lithuania	Ottoman Empire; Crimean Khanate

Commanders and leaders
John III Sobieski	Ibrahim-pasha "the devil" Selim I Giray

Strength
c. 20,000	c. 40,000–50,000

Battle of Żurawno took place between 25 September and 14 October 1676, during the war Polish-Ottoman War (1672–1676). The battle ended in negotiations for peace; the treaty of Żurawno was signed in its aftermath.

== Battle ==
In late August 1676, a large Ottoman-Tatar army of some 50,000 entered the southern Polish province of Pokucie. The invaders were faced by Jan III Sobieski, who had 20,000 soldiers. On 24 September 1676, Polish mounted units clashed with Tatars near Wojnilow and Dolha, and withdrew to the fortified camp in Zurawno.

The Polish camp was protected from two sides by the Dniestr river, while in its front was the Krechowka river. Tatar forces under Selim I Giray concentrated around it by 26 September, while Ottoman units under Ibrahim Shishman arrived there on 28–29 September. The Ottoman forces were hoping that King Sobieski would lead his troops out of the camp, to fight a battle in the open field, but the Poles decided to stay in Zurawno. As a result, a prolonged siege began, initiated by a barrage of the Ottoman artillery, which continued until 5 October 1676. Since Polish losses were high, Sobieski ordered to abandon the first line of defence, along the old redoubt, and occupy the new line, closer to the center of the camp.

The siege of Zurawno continued until 14 October. Ottoman losses were high, and the Poles continued to fight. Although the Poles were running out of food and ammunition, heavy rains put the Ottoman camp at risk of being flooded and the siege that much more difficult. The Ottoman commander Ibrahim Şeytan (Abraham the Devil) decided to initiate negotiations.

== Aftermath ==
On 14 October a truce was signed, and three days later the Treaty of Zurawno was signed, ending the second phase of the Polish–Ottoman War (1672–76). Some sources call this a stalemate, while others call it a victory for the Polish-Lithuanian Commonwealth or Ottoman Empire.

In 1876, on the 200th anniversary of the battle, the Polish population of Zurawno founded a commemorative monument to celebrate the halt of the Ottoman advance into Eastern Europe.

== Sources ==
- Davies, Brian L. (2007). Warfare, State and Society on the Black Sea steppe, 1500—1700. London: Taylor & Francis Group. ISBN 978-0-203-96176-6.
- Nechitailov, Maxim; Velikanov, Vladimir (2020). Щит и меч султана: армия Османского государства в конце XVI-XVII [Shield and sword of the Sultan: the army of the Ottoman State at the end of XVI-XVII]. Ratnoe delo (in Russian). Moscow: Russkie vityazy. ISBN 978-5-907245-05-1.
