= Chyhyryn campaign (1678) =

1678 Ottoman military campaign

- Part of the Russo-Turkish War (1672–1681)
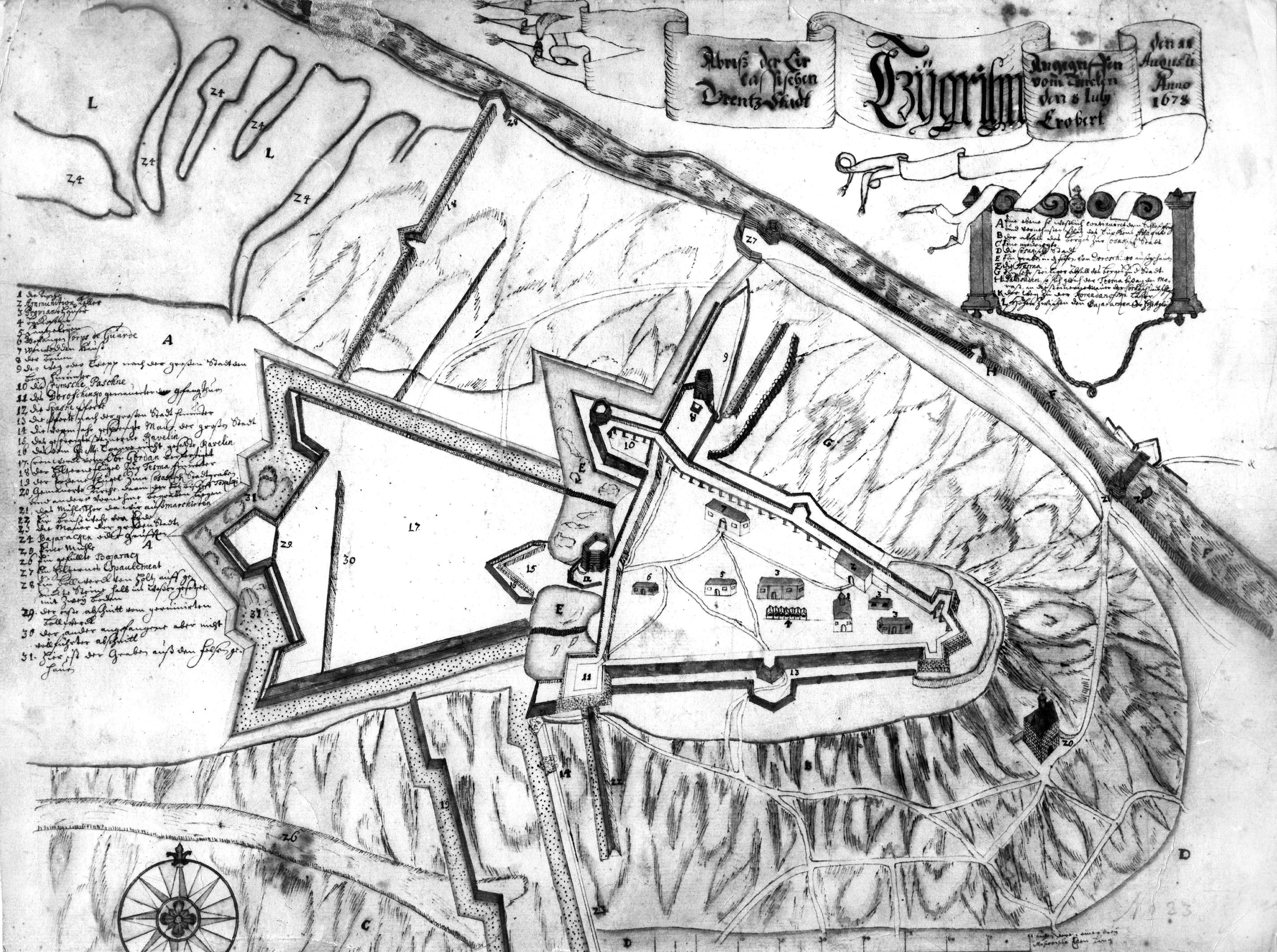
- Plan of the Chigirin fortress, 1678 from the diary of Patrick Gordon
Date	8 July – 18 August 1678
Location	Chyhyryn, Right-bank Ukraine
Result	See § Aftermath

Belligerents
Left-Bank Hetmanate (Tsardom of Russia) Tsardom of Russia; Supported by: Zaporozhian Sich	Ottoman Empire; Crimean Khanate; Right-Bank Hetmanate

Commanders and leaders
(Cossack Hetmanate) Ivan Samoylovych (Tsardom of Russia) Grigory Romodanovsky (Tsardom of Russia) Patrick Gordon (Tsardom of Russia) Kasbulat Cherkassky (Tsardom of Russia) Grigory Kosagov (Tsardom of Russia) V.A. Zmeev (Tsardom of Russia) Ivan Rzhevski †; Supported by: Ivan Sirko	(Ottoman Empire) Mehmed IV (Ottoman Empire) Kara Mustafa Pasha (Ottoman Empire) Kaplan Pasha (Ottoman Empire) Ker Hasan Pasha; Murad Giray (Cossack Hetmanate) Yuri Khmelnitsky

Strength
(Cossack Hetmanate) (Tsardom of Russia) 120,000	(Ottoman Empire) 200,000 (Cossack Hetmanate) Unknown

Casualties and losses
(Cossack Hetmanate) (Tsardom of Russia) c. 17,000 killed and wounded or ~8,000 killed; ~7,000 wounded	(Ottoman Empire) 12,000–36,000 casualties (Cossack Hetmanate) Unknown

The Chyhyryn campaign or Chigirin campaign was launched by the Ottoman-led coalition against the Cossack-Russian defenders of Chyhyryn with the goal of capturing the fortress, from 8 July to 17 August 1678.

== Prelude ==
After repelling an Ottoman assault in November 1677, Patrick Gordon was appointed as the major general of the Chyhyryn garrison. Mehmed IV personally supervised the Ottoman army and appointed Kara Mustafa Pasha to lead the army in the new campaign on Chyhyryn. On July 6, Cossack-Russian army didn't make serious attempt to try preventing the Ottoman-Tatar army of Kara Mustafa from approaching Chyhyryn.

== Campaign ==
On July 8, Ottoman army approached Chyhyryn. On July 9, Kosagov retreated from his position which was soon occupied by Tatars. On July 12, the regiment of V.A. Zmeev, had to fight against a superior Ottoman-Tatar army, but managed to repel them with massive artillery fire from the other bank of the Dnieper, allowing the overturned regiments of V.A. Zmeev to regroup and counterattack, winning the battle.

Ivan Sirko’s Cossacks attacked Ottoman fleet carrying supplies to Ochakiv in the Dnieper–Bug Canal, wiping out nearly every Ottoman ship. Ivan Sirko was conducting raids to disrupt Ottoman supply during their Chyhyryn campaigns.

On July 15, another Ottoman-Tatar attack was repelled by V.A. Zmeev. On July 28, Cherkassky led the Russian army, and on July 31, Romodanovsky moved to Chyhyryn by his order. Ottoman army tested the fortress and found its weaknesses, which they destroyed with their artillery and undermining. Russian troops attempted to knock out Ottoman-Tatar troops on Chyhyryn mountain, but were repulsed. On August 1, Russian forces attacked Ottoman-Tatar forces on Strelkovaya mountain, initially repulsed, but later managed to advance. However, they were surrounded in Ottoman counterattack. Romodanovsky's regiment came to their assistance and Russian forces managed to defeat Ottoman-Tatar forces on Strelkovaya mountain. Russian forces pursued Ottoman-Tatar forces to Tyasma river and Samoylovych's Cossacks raided Ottoman camp near Chyhyryn. Despite Russian-Cossack victory on the Tyasma river, Chyhyryn was still besieged.

On August 3, Chyhyryn was constantly shelled. Romodanovsky stood behind Tyasma river after his victory on Chyhyryn heights, without making serious efforts to relief Chyhyryn garrison and defeat Kara Mustafa's army. On August 11, Mustafa blew up 2 undermines and stormed the Lower Town of the Chyhyryn. However, Gordon recaptured Lower Town and restored communication with other commanders, ordering them to retreat from Chyhyryn. The garrison of the fortress was disorientated by their command, which led to disorganised retreat and heavy losses. Cossacks didn't want to give up the fortress, so at night they sneaked out and blew up the powder depots. The explosion resulted in Chyhyryn being reduced to rubble, killing many Turkish-Tatar troops in process. Around 5,000 are believed to have been killed in explosion.

Ottoman-Tatar army pursued Cossack-Russian forces to the Dnieper till they reached an old fortified camp, in which Cossack-Russian forces entrenched themselves. On August 14, Romodanosky and Samoylovych had to repel Turkish-Tatar attacks, which lasted several days. On August 17, Cossack-Russian forces made a major counterattack with their entire forces on the advancing Ottoman-Tatar army, which they overturned and pursued them all the way to the ruins of Chyhyryn. After this victory, Cossack-Russian troops managed to reach Left-Bank without being pursued. Sirko's sabotage actions made it possible for the Russian-Cossack army to overcome Ottoman-led forces near Chyhyryn. The fighting concluded on 18 August. Ottoman-led forces soon abandoned Chyhyryn.

== Aftermath ==
The Ottoman-led army managed to expel Chyhyryn garrison and capture the fortress, but were unable to hold it due to being weakened by the fighting and having to deal with frequent raids of Ivan Sirko. Ottoman losses in this campaign were too heavy for Ottomans to continue such large-scale campaigns.

In histography, some view events of Chyhyryn Campaign in 1678 as either inconclusive or an Ottoman victory. However, there is also another view that Chyhyryn wasn't central to the Russo-Turkish War and describe it as Russian-Cossack victory. That is, the main Russian goals of defending Left-Bank and driving the civilians of Ottoman-held Right-Bank to Sloboda Ukraine were accomplished despite being forced to abandon Chyhyryn.

12,000–20,000 Turkish-Tatar troops were killed, while around 8,720 Russian troops were killed, wounded or went missing during the campaign. Cossack losses thought to have been comparable, according to Davies. According to other estimates, Ottomans lost 36,000 troops. Yafarova's work provides precise data on Russian and Cossack losses, a total of about 15,000 people killed and wounded. Turkish losses are unknown. N.A. Smirnov estimated them at 12-15,000 people.

== Bibliography ==
- Davies, Brian (2007). Warfare, State and Society on the Black Sea Steppe, 1500-1700. Routledge. ISBN 978-0415239868.
- Smoliy, V. (1994). Володарі гетьманської булави: Іст. портрети (in Ukrainian). Kyiv: Варта. ISBN 5-203-01639-9.
