= Inhul =

Inhul, Інгул
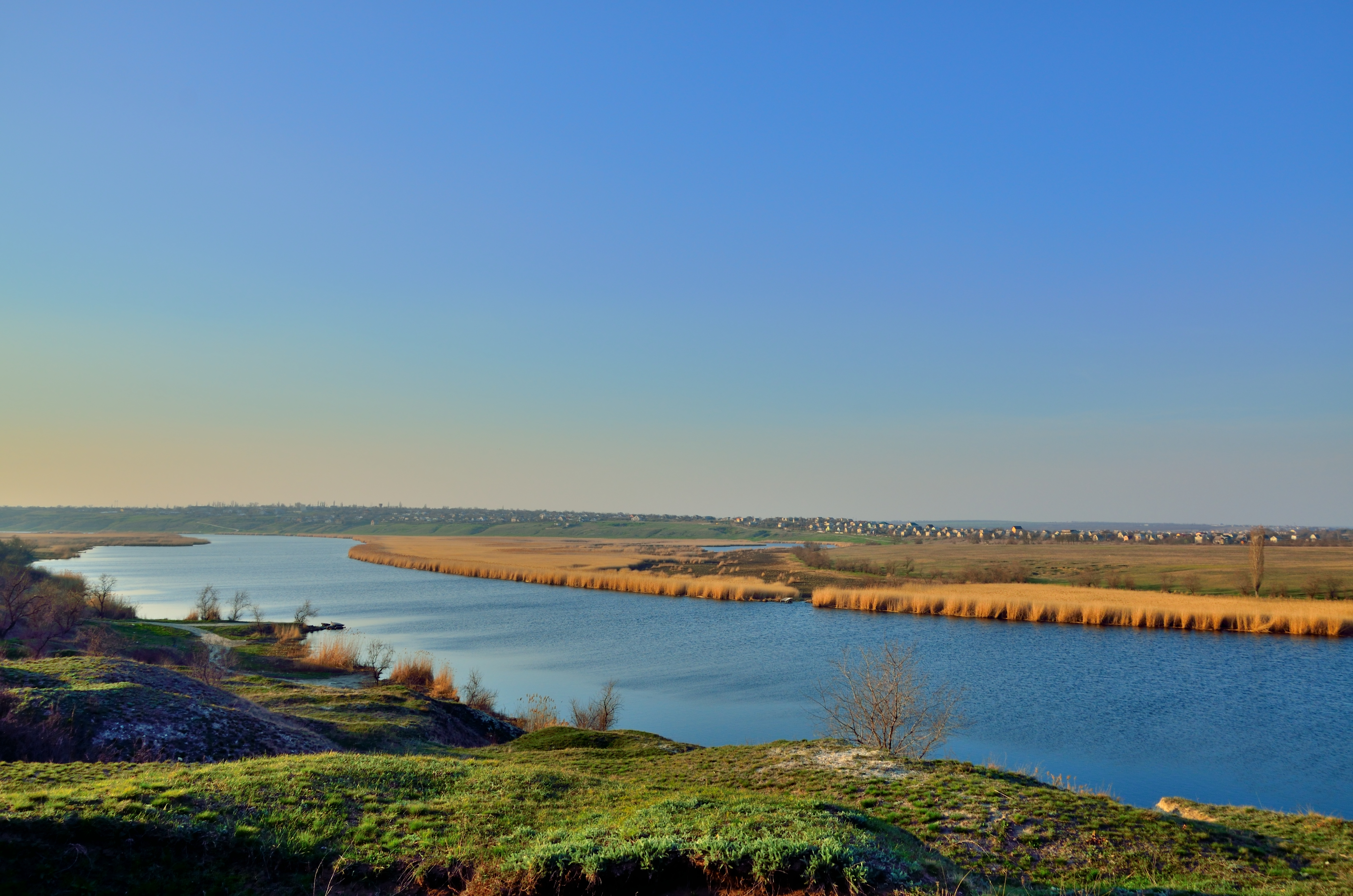

Location
- Country: Ukraine

Physical characteristics
- Source
  - location: Kirovohrad Oblast
  - elevation: 170 m
- Mouth: Southern Bug
  - coordinates: 46.9866°N 31.9855°E
- Length: 354 km (220 mi)
- Basin size: 9,890 km^{2} (3,820 sq mi)
- Discharge
  - location: Novohorozhene, Bashtanka Raion
  - average: 8.84 m^{3}/s (312 cu ft/s)

Basin features
- Progression: Southern Bug→ Dnieper–Bug estuary→ Black Sea

The Inhul (Ukrainian: Інгул) is a left tributary of the Southern Bug (Boh) and is the 14th longest river of Ukraine. It flows through the Kirovohrad and Mykolaiv regions.

It starts near the village of Rodnykivka, Oleksandriia Raion in Kirovohrad Oblast (Central Ukraine), flowing south towards the Southern Bug at Mykolaiv, which is 65 km (40 miles) north (up river) from where the Southern Bug empties into the Black Sea. The Inhul River is 354 km (220 mi) long.

The river valley is mostly trapezium-like with a width of up to 4 km and a depth of up to 60 meters. At the upper stream it has a narrow winding channel that cuts through the Dnieper Upland, and its rocky banks show granite and gneiss; at the middle and lower stream after entering the Black Sea Lowland, it widens up to 30 meters and over. The river freezes over in December and thaws sometime in March.

Among major cities on the river are Kropyvnytskyi and Mykolaiv.

== Gallery ==
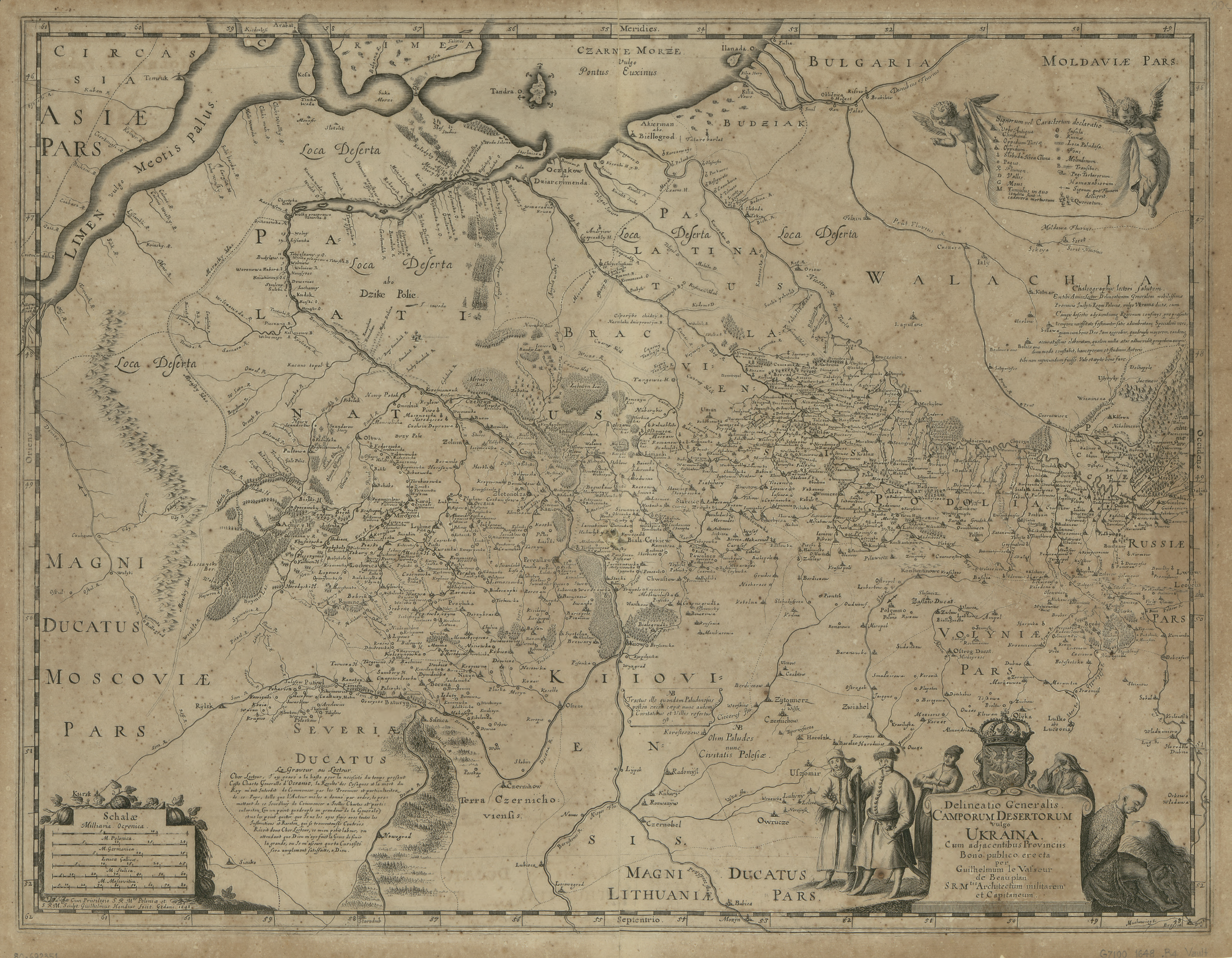
The Beauplan's map with Angul and Angulet wielki flowing to Boh river from area of Black Forest (Nigra sylva), west of Angulet mialy

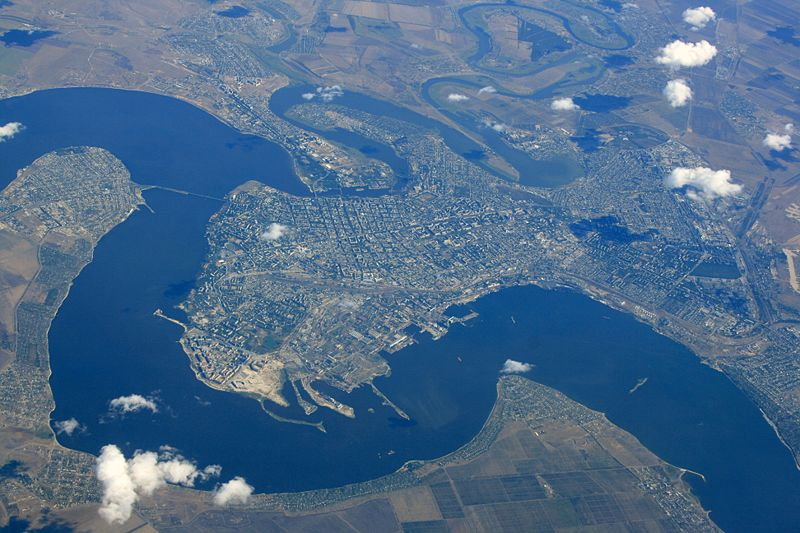
Aerial view of confluence of Boh and Inhul at Mykolaiv (main course is Boh, Inhul is at top and upper right corner of the picture)

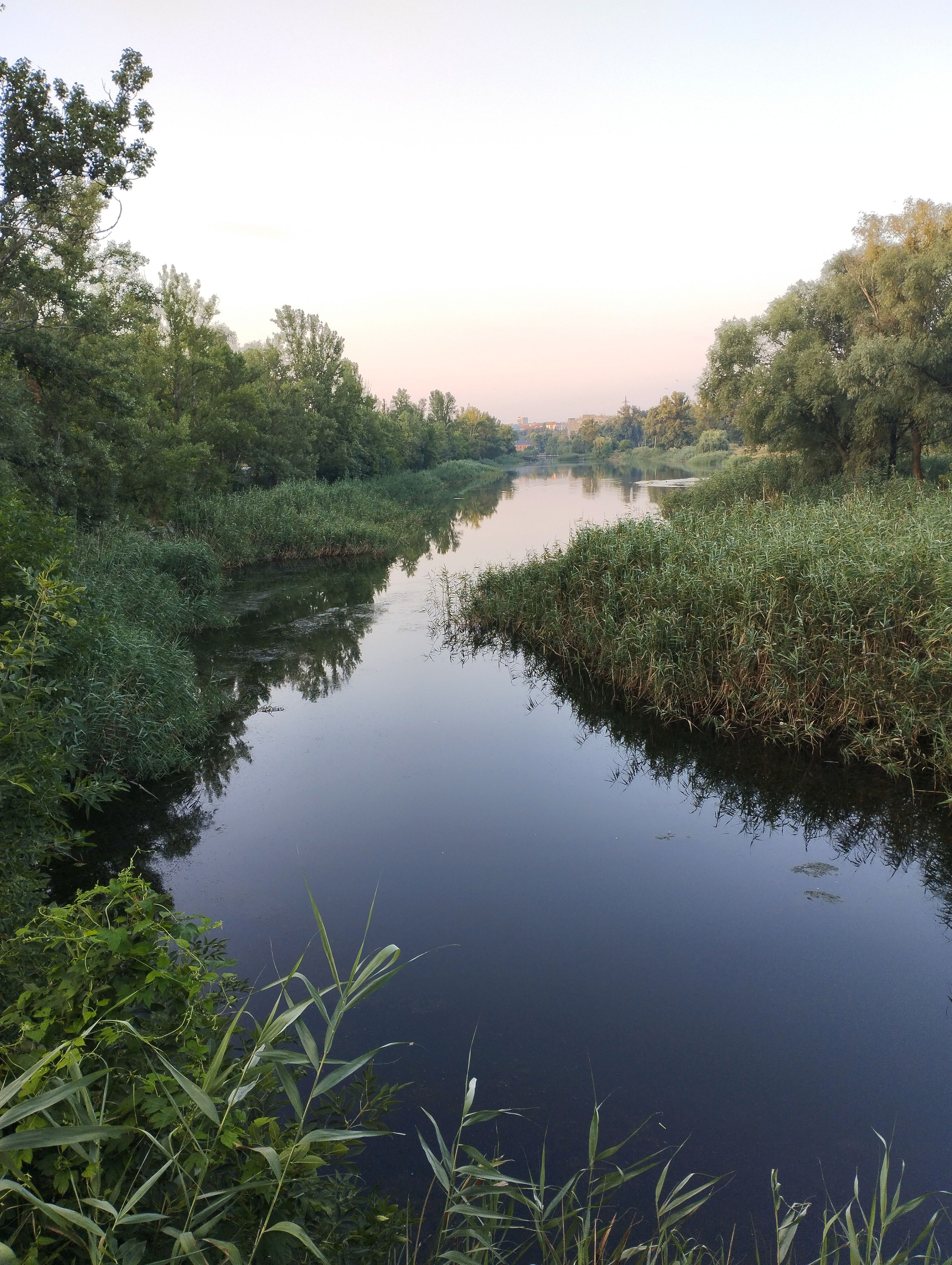
Ingul in Kropyvnytskyi

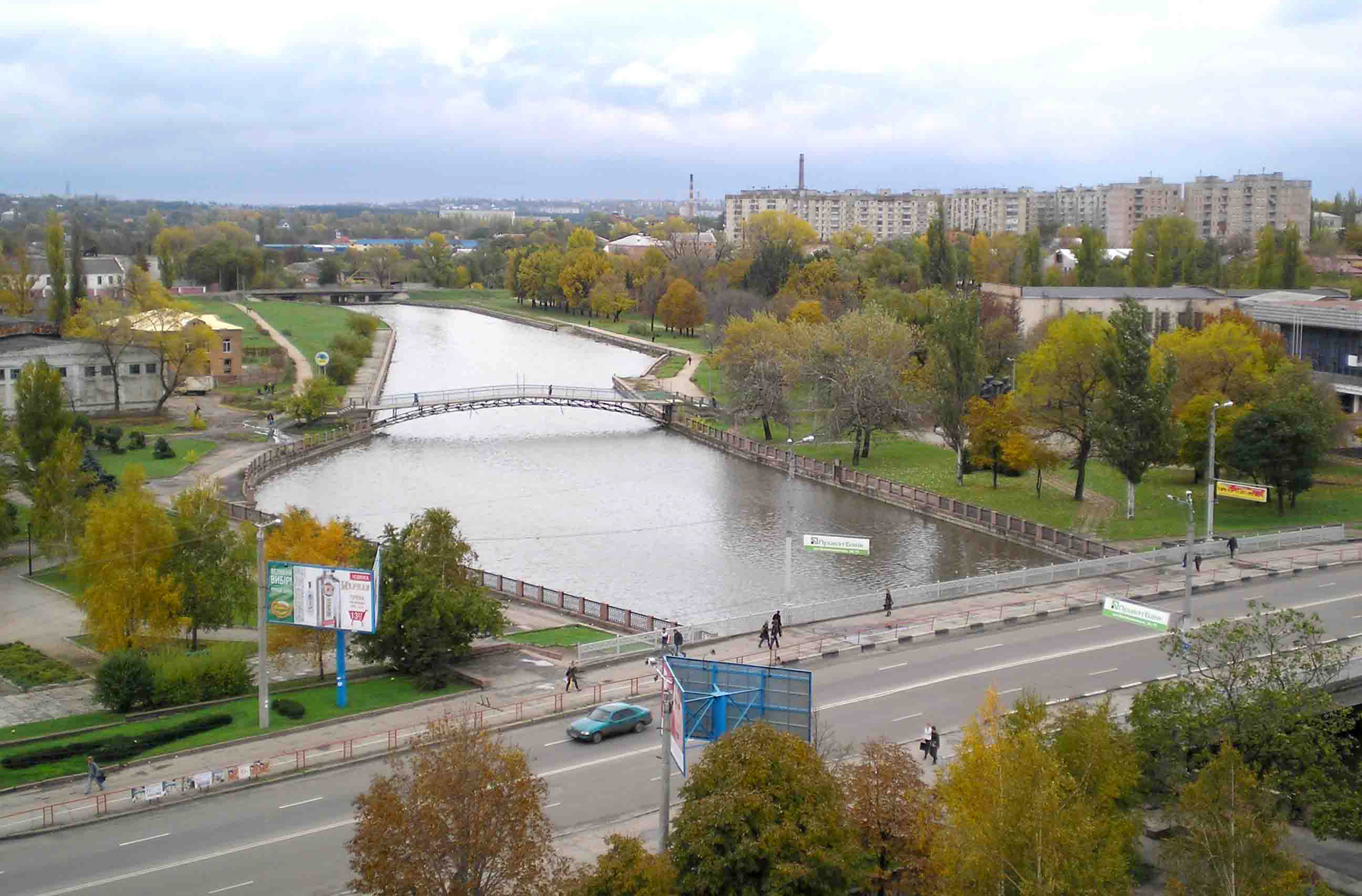
The embankment of the Inhul River. Kropyvnytskyi

== See also ==
- Inhul River Park
