= Treaty of Bakhchisarai =

1681 peace treaty between Russia and the Ottoman Empire

The Treaty of Bakhchysarai or Treaty of Radzin, (Russian: Бахчисарайский мирный договор; Turkish: Bahçesaray Antlaşması) was signed by Muscovy, the Ottoman Empire, and the Crimean Khanate on 3 (13) January 1681 in Bakhchysarai. It established a 20-year truce, which ended the Russo-Turkish War (1676–1681).

The three states accepted the Dnieper River as the demarcation line between the Ottoman Empire (including Right-bank Ukraine, which had been forcibly depopulated in 1674–1679), and the Muscovite domain. The latter now included the Left-bank Hetmanate and the Zaporizhian Sich, although the Cossacks living in these territories were excluded from the negotiations. All sides agreed not to settle the territory between the Southern Bug and Dnieper rivers, thus legalising the Great Expulsion of the Right Bank of 1674–1679 by the Muscovites and Left-bank Cossacks. After the signing of the treaty, the Nogai hordes still retained the right to live as nomads in the southern steppes of Ukraine, while the Cossacks retained the right to fish in the Dnieper and its tributaries; to obtain salt in the south; and to sail on the Dnieper and the Black Sea. The Ottoman sultan then recognized Russia's sovereignty in Left-bank Ukraine and the Zaporozhian Cossack domain, while the Bratslav Voivodeship, and the Podolian Voivodeship, and the southern part of the Kyiv Voivodeship were left under Ottoman control.

The Treaty of Bakhchysarai once again redistributed the Ukrainian lands between neighboring states. The treaty was also of great international significance and precipitated the signing of “Eternal Peace” in 1686 between Russia and the Polish–Lithuanian Commonwealth.

== Treaty provisions ==
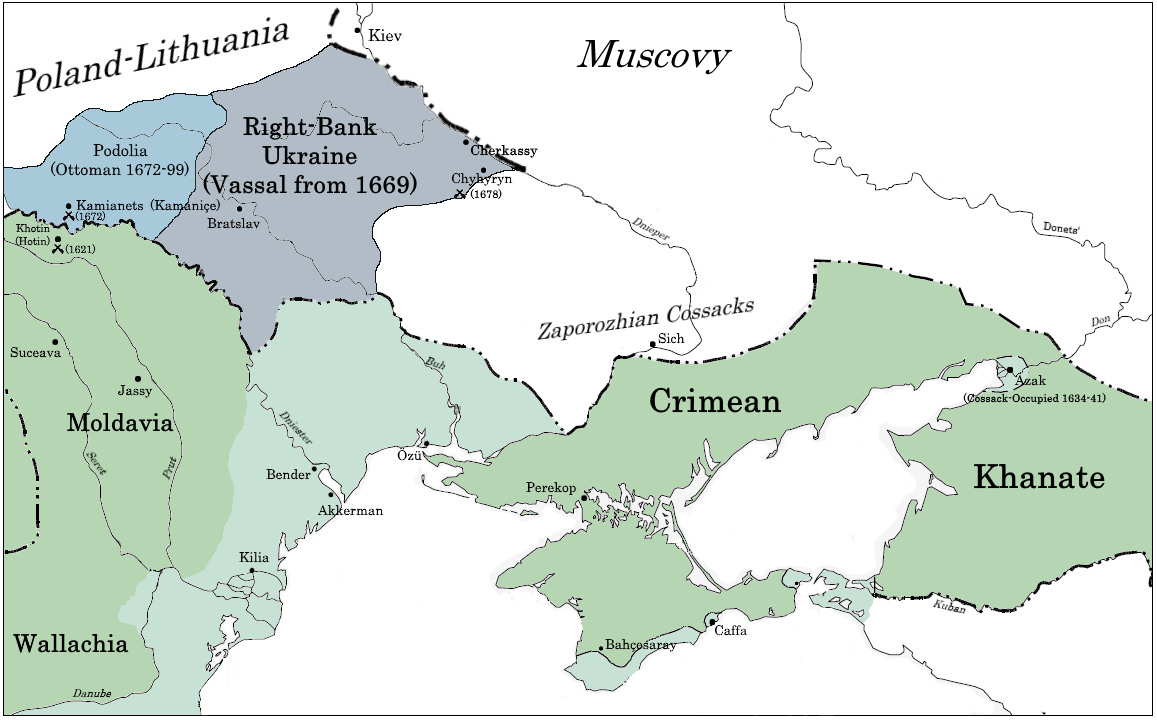
South Right-bank Ukraine (bluish grey) as a vassal of the Ottoman Empire

The treaty was concluded for a period of 20 years and ended the wars of the 1670s between these states for possession of lands on the right bank of the Dnieper.

- the border between Russia and the Ottoman Empire was to constitute the river Dnipro, with Russia being awarded Kiev together with the towns of Stajki, Trypillia, Vasylkiv, Didowszczyzna, Radomyshl, located on the right "Ottoman" bank of the river, the Ottoman Empire recognized the sovereignty of Russia over Left-bank Ukraine.
- lands at Right-bank Ukraine between the Dnieper, Southern Bug, Kiev and Chyhyryn were to remain uninhabited.
- Sultan of the Ottoman Empire pledged not to support the enemies of Russia.
- Crimean Tatars and Nogais was granted the right to camp and hunt on the southern steppe of Ukraine on both sides of the Dnieper.
- the territory between Dniester and Southern Bug would remain uninhabited for 20 years, it was also not allowed to build fortifications there.
- Zaporozhian Cossacks formally became independent and received the right of free navigation across the Dnieper and its tributaries up to Black Sea, as well as the right to fish and the extraction and production of salt.
- Russia agreed to pay tribute to the Crimean Khans for the past 3 years and annually after that.
- Cossacks received the right to fish, salt and free swimming on the Dnieper and its tributaries to Black Sea.

== Aftermath ==
Despite the treaty, Russia joined a European coalition against the Ottoman Empire in 1686.

== Gallery ==
First page of the treaty (National Archives of Sweden)

Second and third page of the treaty (National Archives of Sweden)

Fouth page of the treaty (National Archives of Sweden)

== See also ==
- Great Expulsion (Ukraine)
- List of treaties

== Sources ==
- "Bakhchysarai, Treaty of". Encyclopedia of Ukraine. Vol. 1. Canadian Institute of Ukrainian Studies. 1984.
- Lewis, Bernard; Dodge, Cleveland E, eds. (2002). What Went Wrong?: Western Impact and Middle Eastern Response. Oxford University Press.
- Mikaberidze, Alexander (2011). "Treaty of Bakhchisarai". In Mikaberidze, Alexander (ed.). Conflict and Conquest in the Islamic World: A Historical Encyclopedia. Vol. I. ABC-CLIO.
