= Russo-Turkish War (1672–1681) =

Second conflict of the Russo-Turkish wars

Russo–Turkish War (1672–1681) Chyryhyn campaigns
- Part of the Russo-Turkish wars and the Ruin
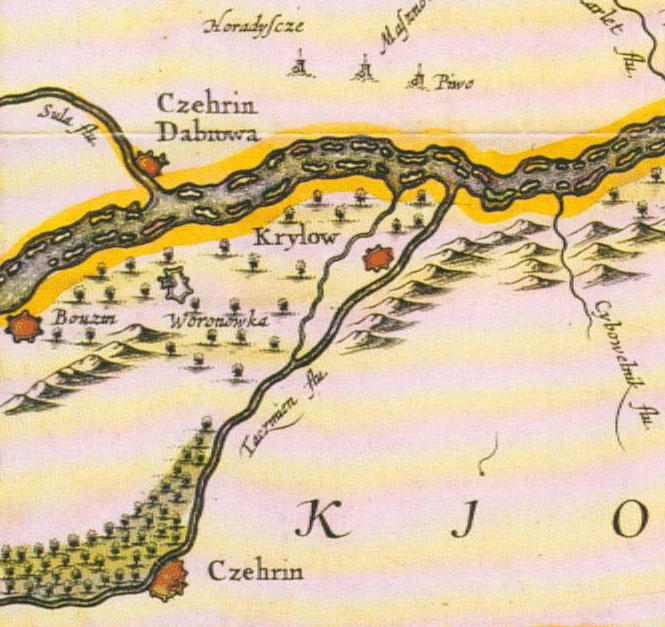
- Chyhyryn (Czehrin) at the bottom and the Dnieper through the middle of the map (the north to the left)
Date	1672–1681
Location	Right-bank Ukraine around Chyhyryn (mainly), Left-Bank, Zaporozhian Sich, Crimea
Result	Disputed; Treaty of Bakhchisarai

Belligerents
Ottoman Empire; Crimean Khanate; Ottoman Ukraine	(Russia) Russian Tsardom; Cossack Hetmanate; Zaporozhian Sich; Kalmyk Khanate; Kabardia (East Circassia)

Commanders and leaders
(Ottoman Empire) Mehmed IV (Ottoman Empire) Kara Mustafa Pasha; Selim I Giray (Cossack Hetmanate) Petro Doroshenko (surrendered) (Cossack Hetmanate) Yuri Khmelnitsky	(Russia) Alexis (Russia) Feodor III (Russia) Grigory Romodanovsky (Cossack Hetmanate) Ivan Samoylovych; Ivan Sirko (Kalmyk Khanate) Mazan Batur

Strength
120,000–200,000 (maximum value, 1678 campaign)	70,000–135,000; 11,700 Chyhyryn garrison (maximum value, 1678 campaign)

Casualties and losses
1677 campaign: 20,000; 1678 campaign: 12,000–36,000	1677 campaign: 8,000; 1678 campaign: c. 17,000

The Russo-Turkish War of 1672–1681, also known as the Chyryhyn campaigns, was a war between the Tsardom of Russia and Ottoman Empire, caused by Turkish expansionism in the second half of the 17th century. Is the largest and one of the most important series of military campaigns before the Great Turkish War.

== Prelude ==
After having captured and devastated the region of Podolia in the course of the Polish–Turkish War of 1672–1676, the Ottoman government strove to spread its rule over all of Right-bank Ukraine with the support of its vassal (since 1669), Hetman Petro Doroshenko. The latter's pro-Turkish policy caused discontent among many Ukrainian Cossacks, which would lead to the election of Ivan Samoilovich (hetman of the Left-bank Ukraine) as the sole hetman of all Ukraine in 1674.

Despite this, Doroshenko continued to keep Chyhyryn, an important Cossack town near the Dnieper river. He cleverly maneuvered between Moscow and Warsaw and used the support of the Turkish-Tatar army. Finally, the Russian and Ukrainian forces under the command of Samoilovich and Grigory Romodanovsky besieged Chyhyryn and forced Doroshenko to surrender in 1676. Leaving a garrison in Chyhyryn, the Russian and Ukrainian armies retreated to the left bank of the Dnieper.

The supply of Ottoman forces operating in Moldavia and Wallachia was a major challenge that required well organized logistics. An army of 60,000 soldiers and 40,000 horses required a half-million kilograms of food per day. The Ottoman forces fared better than the Russians, but the expenses crippled both national treasuries. Supplies on both sides came using fixed prices, taxes, and confiscation.

== 1677 Campaign ==
The Ottoman Sultan Mehmed IV appointed Yuri Khmelnitsky, who had been the sultan's prisoner at that time, hetman of Right-bank Ukraine. In July 1677, the sultan ordered his army (45,000 men) under the command of Ibrahim Pasha to advance towards Chyhyryn. On 30 July 1677, advanced detachments appeared at the fortress, and on August 3 – the main Turkish forces. Samoilovich and Grigory Romodanovsky's army joined on August 10, and only on August 24 did they cross the Sula river on the way to Chyhyryn. On August 26–27, a skirmish between their and Ottoman troops removed Ottoman observation posts and allowed the rest of the Russian and Ukrainian forces to cross the river under the cover of artillery fire. Turkish attempts to drop back into the river at the first crossing detachment under the command of Major-General Shepelev were repulsed. Russian and Ukrainian cavalry attacked and overwhelmed the Turkish-Tatar army camp on August 28, inflicting heavy casualties. The following day, Ibrahim Pasha lifted the siege of Chyhyryn and hastily retreated to the Inhul river and beyond. Samoilovich and Grigory Romodanovsky relieved Chyhyryn on September 5. The Ottoman Army had lost 20,000 men and Ibrahim was imprisoned upon his return to Constantinople and Crimean Khan Selim I Giray lost his throne.

== 1678 Campaign ==
Map-scheme of the Chyhyryn fortress on the eve of the siege of 1678 I - Central bastion or "bulwark" of the New Castle II - Bastion ("dungeon") of Doroshenko III - Bastion with the Crimean Tower IV - The Spassky Gate with a wooden tower and a double ravelin in front of them V - Wooden tower on a stone foundation, "New Goat Horn" VI - Tower and the well VII - Stone corner bastion VIII - Stone round tower IX - The Kyiv Tower with a gate to the bridge X - Noname tower (just built in 1678) XI - The Korsun or Mill Tower XII - Gate to the Lower Town

In July 1678, the Turkish army (approx. 70,000 men) of the Grand Vizier Kara Mustafa with the Crimean Tatar army (up to 50,000 men) besieged Chyhyryn once again. The Russian and Ukrainian armies (70,000–80,000) broke through the fortified position of the Turkish covering force and turned them to flight. Then they entrenched on the left bank of the Tiasmyn river opposite the fortress with the Turkish-Crimean army on the other bank. The crossings were destroyed and it was difficult to attack the Turks. The troops could freely enter Chyhyryn, but it was already surrounded by well-equipped siege positions and was heavily bombarded; its fortifications were badly damaged. When the Turks broke into the Lower Town of Chyhyryn on August 11, Romodanovsky ordered to leave the citadel and withdraw troops to the left bank. The Russian army retreated beyond the Dnieper, beating off the pursuing Turkish army, which would finally leave them in peace. Later the Turks seized Kanev and established the power of Yuri Khmelnitsky on Right-bank Ukraine, but did not go to Kiev, where the Russian troops were stationed. During the campaign 12,000–20,000 Turkish-Tatar troops were killed, while around 17,000 Cossack-Russian troops were killed or went missing during the campaign. According to other estimates, Ottomans lost over 30,000 troops.

In 1679–1680, the Russians repelled the attacks of the Crimean Tatars and signed the Bakhchisaray Peace Treaty on 3 January 1681, which would establish the Russo-Turkish border by the Dnieper.

== Result of the war ==
The result of the war, which was ended by the Treaty of Bakhchisarai, is disputed. Some historians mention it was an Ottoman victory, (Note: In the decades preceding the Ottomans’ attempted siege of Vienna in 1683 Ottoman armies had successfully prosecuted single-front wars.[..]..and Russia (the siege of Çehrin [Chyhyryn] in 1678).) while another historian contends that it was a Russian victory. (Note: "Despite the loss of Chyhyryn the war aims of greatest importance to Moscow were therefore achieved. Khan Murat Girei was compelled to negotiate at Bakhchisarai a twenty-year armistice with Muscovy formally acknowledging Kiev and the Left Bank as Muscovite possessions. Murat Girei played a crucial role in subsequently inducing Sultan Mehmed IV to ratify these same terms. For Mehmed IV and Grand Vizier Kara Mustafa the destruction of Chyhyryn was thereby rendered a Pyrrhic victory.") While some historians state the war was indecisive (stalemate). (Note: Russia was drawn into war with the Ottoman empire (1676–81) that ended in stalemate in the armistice of Bakhchisarai in 1681.) (Note: The indecisive Russo-Turkish War from 1676 to 1681 centered on control of the fortress of Chigirin...)

== Sources and further reading ==
- Velikanov, Vladimir; Nechitailov, Maxim (2019). Азиатский дракон перед Чигирином [Asian dragon in front of Chigirin] (in Russian). Russian Academy of Sciences: Ratnoe delo. Moscow: Русские витязи. ISBN 978-5-6041924-7-4.
- Florya, Boris N. (2001). Litarvin, G. (ed.). Османская империя и страны Центральной, Восточной и Юго-Восточной Европы (in Russian). Moscow: Памятники исторической мысли. ISBN 5-88451-114-0.
- Perrie, Maurren (2006). The Cambridge history of Russia. Volume 1: From early Rus' to 1689. Cambridge university Press. ISBN 0-521-81227-5.
- Gumilev, Lev (2023) [1996]. От Руси к России [For Rus' to Russia]. Эксклюзивная классика (revised ed.). Moscow: AST. ISBN 978-5-17-153845-3.
- Aksan, Virginia H. (1995). "Feeding the Ottoman troops on the Danube, 1768–1774". War & Society. 13 (1): 1–14. doi:10.1179/072924795791200150.
- Davies, Brian (2006). "Muscovy at war and peace". In Perrie, Maureen (ed.). The Cambridge History of Russia From Early Rus to 1689. Vol. 1. Cambridge University Press.
- Davies, Brian (2007). Warfare, State and Society on the Black Sea Steppe, 1500–1700. Routledge. ISBN 978-0-203-96176-6.
- Davies, Brian (2013). Empire and Military Revolution in Eastern Europe: Russia's Turkish Wars in the Eighteenth Century. Bloomsbury Academic.
- Kollmann, Nancy Shields (2017). The Russia Empire, 1450–1801. Oxford University Press.
- Lewitter, Lucjan Ryszard. "The Russo-Polish Treaty of 1686 and Its Antecedents." Polish Review (1964): 5-29 online.
- Murphey, Rhoads (1999). Ottoman Warfare, 1500-1700. Taylor & Francis.
- Paxton, John; Traynor, John (2004). Leaders of Russia and the Soviet Union. Taylor & Francis Books Inc.
- Stone, David R. (2006). A Military History of Russia: From Ivan the Terrible to the War in Chechnya. Greenwood Publishing.
- Tairova-Yakovleva, Tatiana (2020). Ivan Mazepa and the Russian Empire (PDF). Montreal Kingston London Chicago: McGill-Queen's Press. p. 425. ISBN 978-0-2280-0309-0.
- Yafarova, Madina (2017). Русско-Османское противостояние в 1677-1678 гг. [Russo-Ottoman confrontation of 1677-1678] (PDF) (candidate of science thesis) (in Russian). Moscow: MSU.
