= Lyzohub family =

Ukrainian family

The Pogonia (Lisohub)
- Coat-of-arms claimed to have been granted to Ivan Lizohub in 1661.
- Origin: Helmyaziv, (today in Zolotonosha Raion)
- Members: Fedir Lyzohub; Yakiv Lyzohub
- Connected families: Gogol-Yanovsky; Doroshenko; Skoropadsky; Kochubey
- Estate: Sedniv

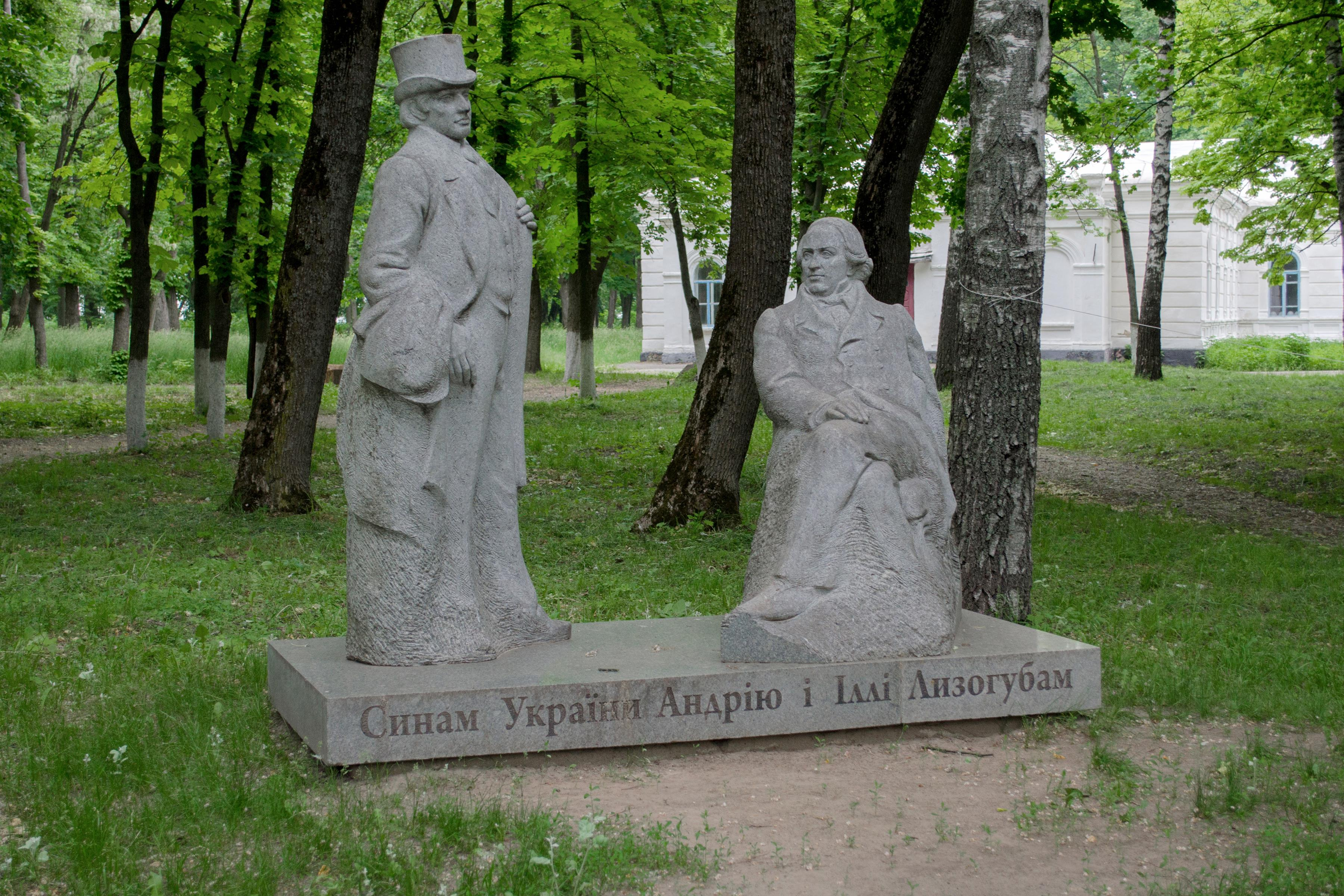
Monument to Illya and Andriy Lyzohubs in Sedniv, Chernihiv Oblast

The Lyzohub family (Ukrainian: Лизогуби; Russian: Лизогубы; also spelled as Lizohub, Lisohub, Lizogub) was a Ukrainian family of the Cossack Hetmanate. For years many members of the family held high offices in the Ukrainian government.

== Origins ==
There are two versions of the origins of the Lyzohub family. One claims they descended from the Kobyzewicz family who were Lithuanian boyars. According to the historian Volodymyr Antonovych who referred to the chronicles of the Lyzohub family, the family was descended from a Cossack Klym Lyzohub who was killed in action in the battle of Lviv in 1648.

The first version was further developed by Ukrainian historians A. Lazarevsky, V. Lukomsky and H. Myloradovych. According to them, Kondratii Ivanovych Kobyzewicz (Kobyzenko), a Cossack of Helmiaziv of the Pereiaslav regiment, supposedly acquired the nickname of Lyzohub. The family supposedly had an estate at Vylychky, near Chernihiv. I. Kondratiev and V. Krivoshey attributed Kondratii Lyzohub to the Liubech gentry (szlachta).

Kondratii Lyzohub supposedly had a daughter named Christiana, and sons: Yakiv, Ivan and Klym.

The researcher Erwin Miden, a post-graduate student of the Chernihiv National Pedagogical University, has debunked the myth of the Lyzohub family's descent from the Kobyzewicz clan. He has also showcased in his article on Colonel Ivan Lyzohub, that his Polish nobility was fabricated by his descendants in the 18th century.

The patent supposedly given to Ivan Lyzohub (under the name of Jan Kobyzewicz) by King Jan Casimir Vasa in 1661 only exists in the copy submitted to the Chernihiv Nobility Assembly by cornet Yakiv Lyzohub in 1799. E. Miden has showcased that the document was fabricated as no record regarding the ennoblement of Ivan Lyzohub exists in the archive of the Warsaw General Sejm of 1661, which was to confirm such ennoblement. Amongst the papers submitted by Yakiv Lyzohub in 1799 was a patent of nobility supposedly given to their progenitor, the assumed father of Cossack Kondratii Lyzohub, Ivan Lyzohub, in 1642 by King Jan Casimir Vasa, when he entered the throne only in 1648.

Ivan (Jan) Kondratovych Kobyzewicz-Lyzohub was the colonel of the Uman and Kaniv Cossack regiments. In 1658 he represented Hetman Ivan Vyhovsky in Moscow. Brothers Ivan and Yakiv Lyzohub sought Moscow nobility. They acquired Moscow nobility (dvorianstvo) before 1667 for spying for the Moscow government.

Yakiv Kondratovych Lyzohub became the colonel of the Kaniv Cossack regiment in 1665. In 1667 he led an embassy of Hetman I. Briukhovetsky to Moscow, where he received a patent of nobility. In 1669—1674 he was the yesaul general of the Cossack army, and in 1670—1673 — an interim hetman. As the colonel of Chernihiv, Yakiv Lyzohub took over the lands of his predecessor, H. Samoilovych, including the estate of Sedniv that had become the family's main seat.

Yakiv Kondratovych Lyzohub is claimed to be the father of Yukhym Lyzohub, the Chernihiv Cossack colonel, who married the daughter of Hetman Petro Doroshenko, Liubov. Their son, Yakiv Lyzohub, became the family's most famed member.

== Notable family members ==
- Ivan Kindratovych Lyzohub (?–after 1662), colonel of Kaniv and Uman regiments, envoy of Ivan Vyhovsky to the Muscovy, participant of the Battle of Konotop, executed on orders of Yurii Khmelnytsky
- Yakiv Kindrotovych Lyzohub (?–1698), colonel of Kaniv Regiment. Brother of Ivan Lyzohub.
- Yukhym Lyzohub (?–1704), Adjutant General. Son-in-low of Hetman Petro Doroshenko.
- Semen Yukhymovych Lyzohub (1689–1734), son-in-low of Hetman Ivan Skoropadsky and grandgrandgrandfather of writer Mykola Gogol.
- Andriy Yukhymovych Lyzohub (1673–1737), sotnyk of Konotop. Grandson of Petro Doroshenko.
- Yakiv Yukhymovych Lyzohub (1675–1749), Quartermaster General, acting hetman, member of the Governing Council of the Hetman Office.
- Illya Yakovych Lyzohub (?–1781), acting Pryluky colonel.
- Ivan Yakovych Lyzohub (1761–1819), provincial Marshal of the Chernihiv Nobility.
- Illya Ivanovych Lyzohub (1787–1867), composer.
- Oleksandr Ivanovych Lyzohub (1790–1839), general major.
- Dmytro Andriyovych Lyzohub (1849–1879), famous revolutionary-narodnik, brother of Fedir Lyzohub.
- Fedir Andriyovych Lyzohub (1862–1928), a Prime Minister of Ukraine (1918)

== Relation to Nikolai Gogol ==
Nikolai Gogol's grandmother was Tetiana Lyzohub, the daughter of the Chernihiv landlord Semyon Semenovych Lyzohub. Tetiana Lyzohub was a great-granddaughter of Hetman Petro Doroshenko and a granddaughter of Hetman Ivan Skoropadsky. She secretly married her teacher Afanasii Yanovsky. A connection to the Lyzohub family allowed Afanasii Yanovsky to pursue military career. Later, he made himself ennobled as a claimant to the descent from Hetman Ostap Gogol.

== Gallery ==
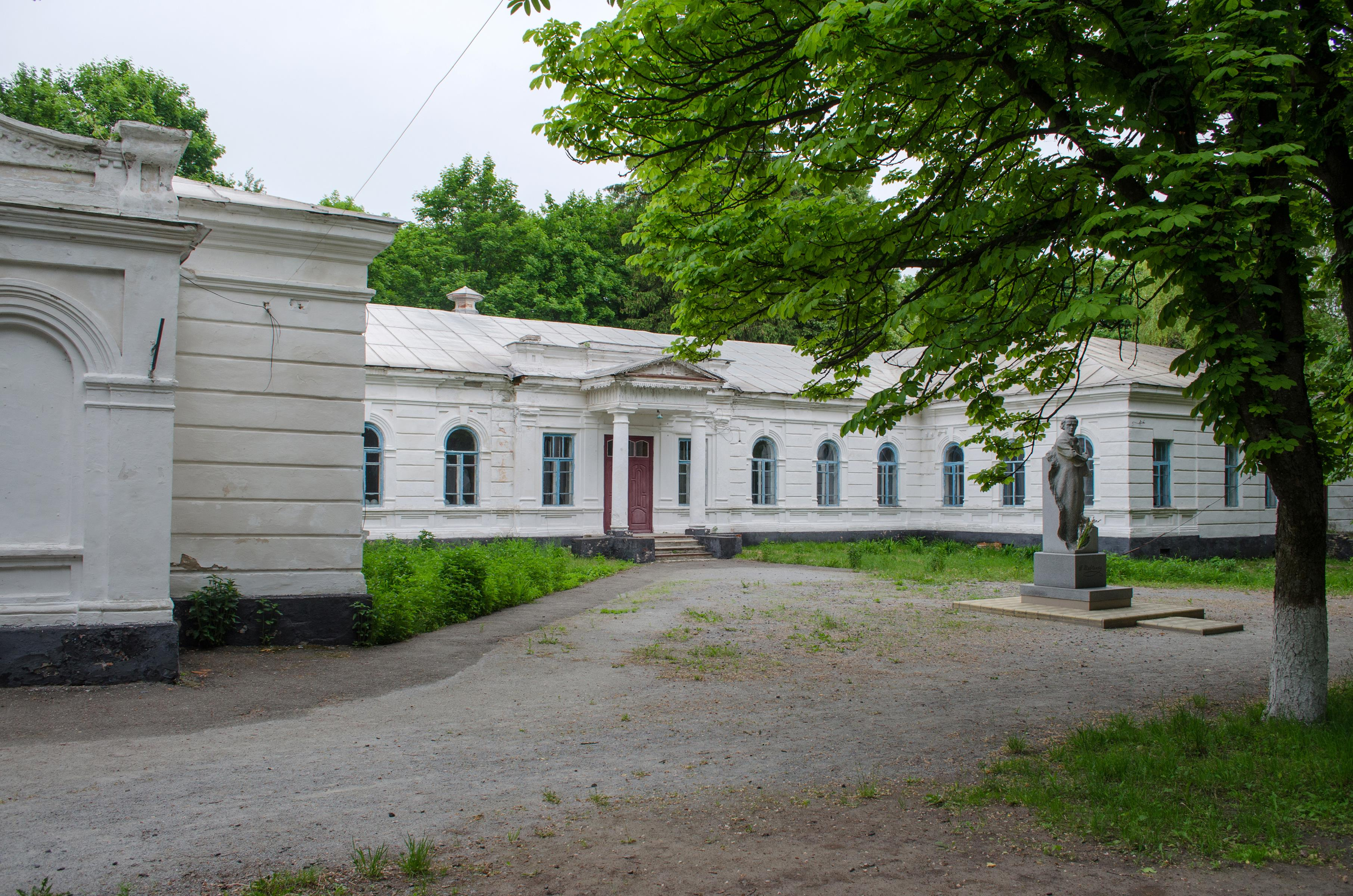
Private manor in Sedniv, in front is a Shevchenko monument

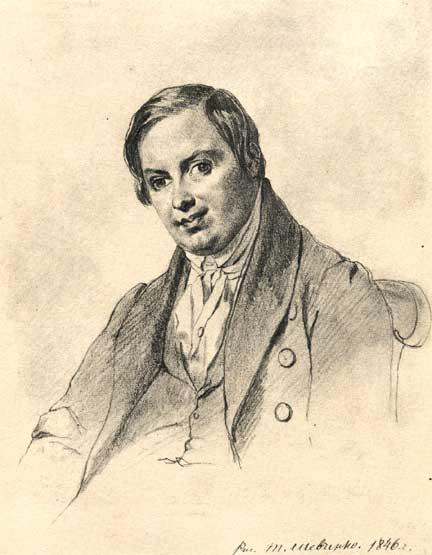
Portrait of Andriy Lyzohub by Taras Shevchenko, 1847

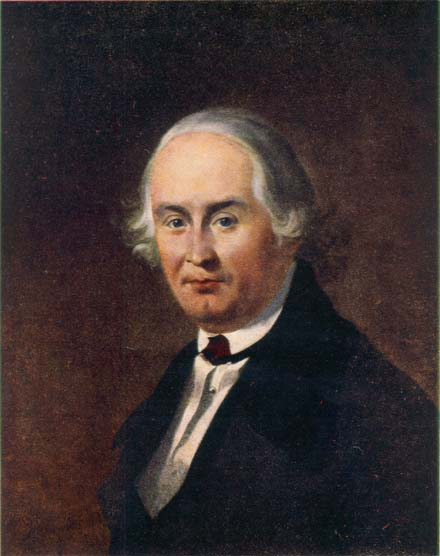
Portrait of Illya Lyzohub by Taras Shevchenko, 1847

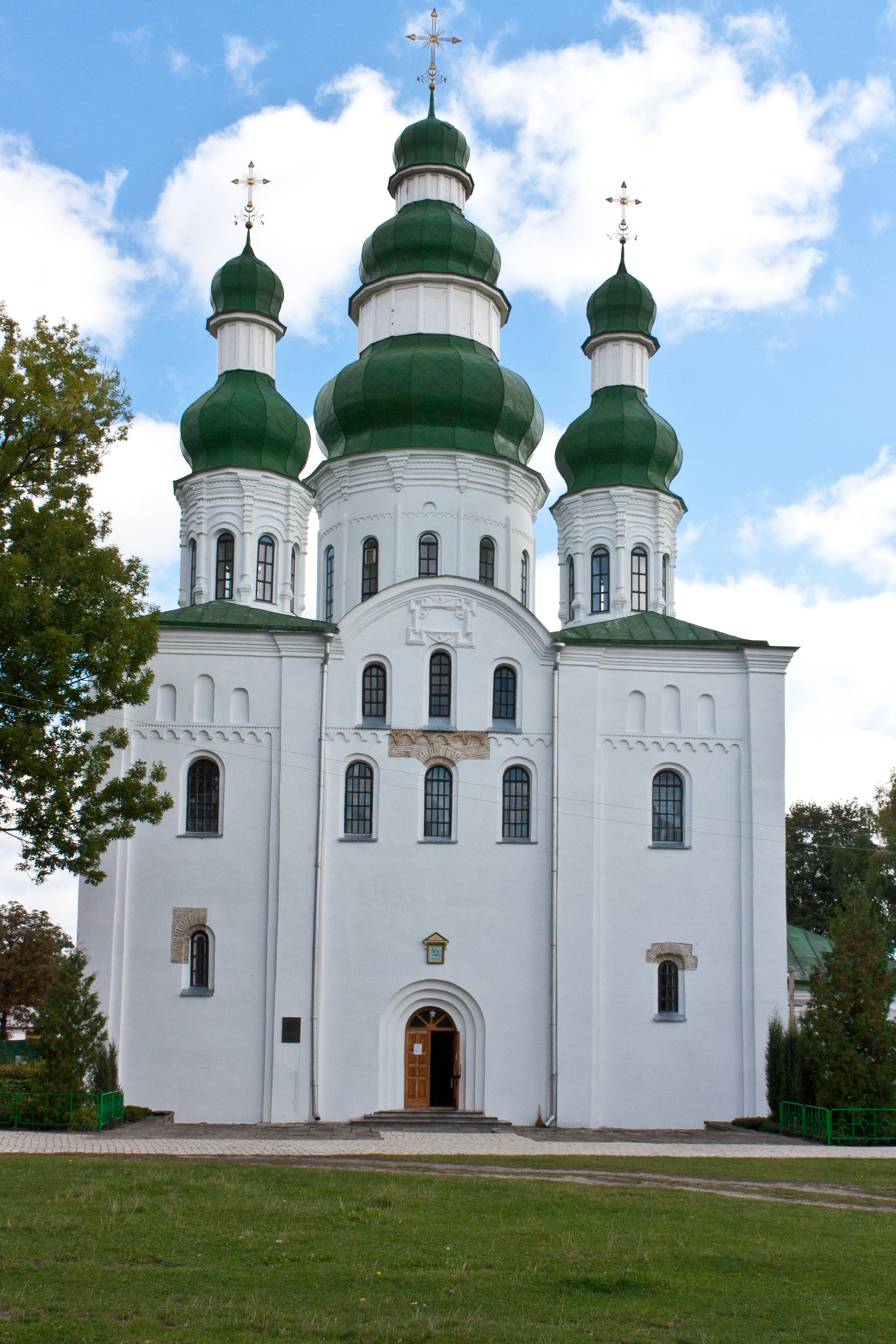
Dormition Cathedral of the Yelets Monastery contains tomb of Yakiv Lyzohub

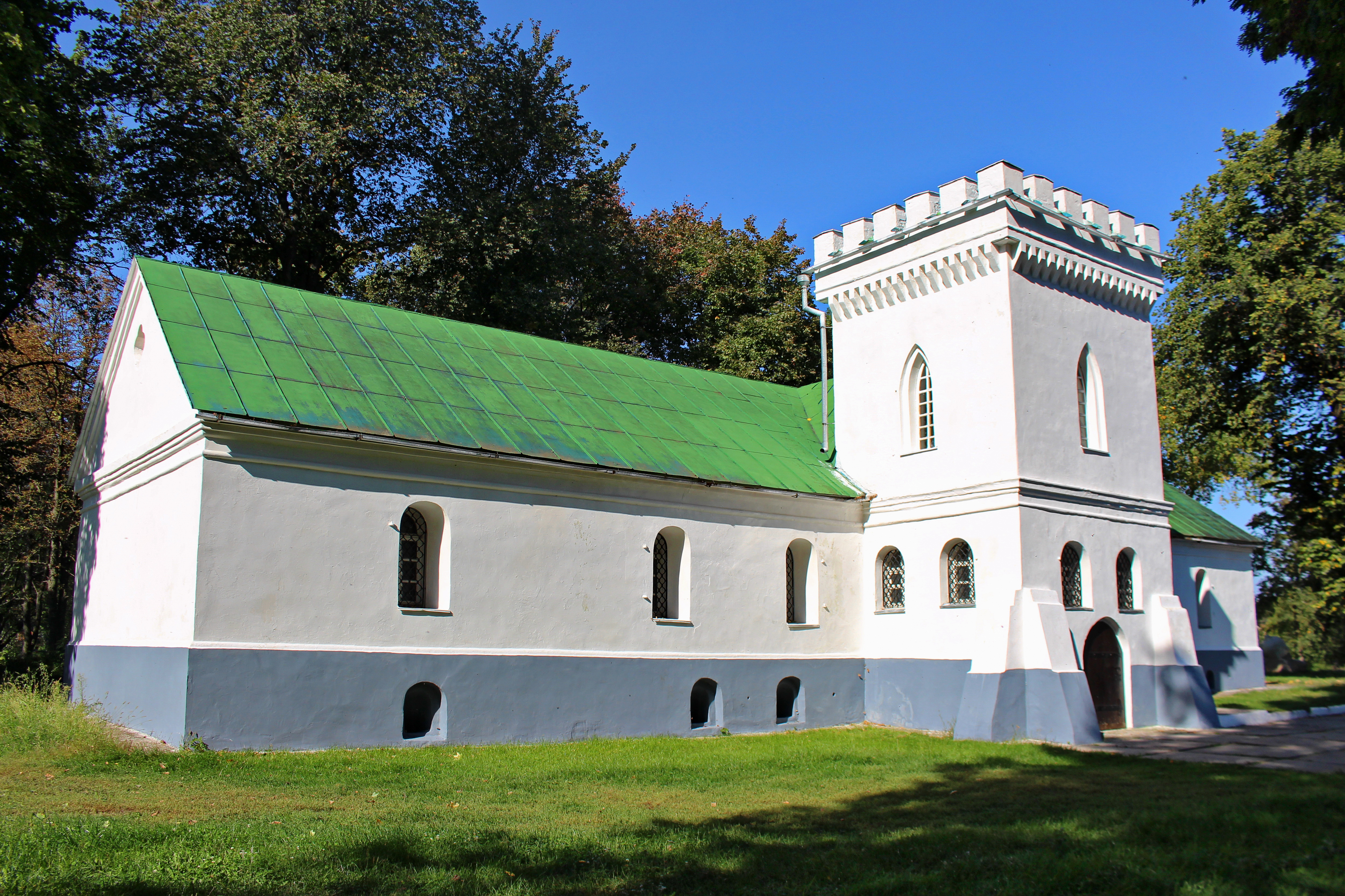
Lyzohubs' Stone House in Sedniv

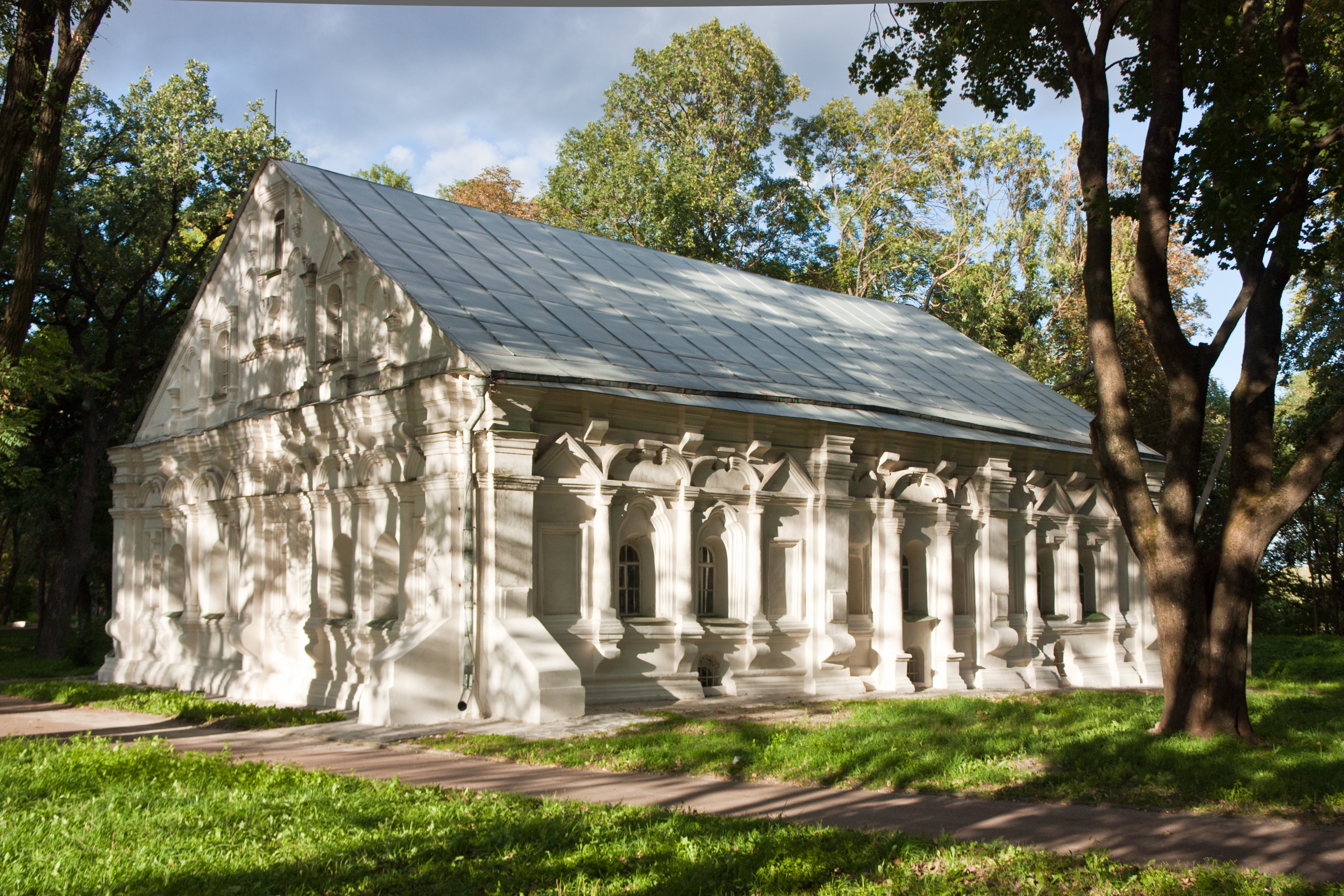
Lyzohub House in Chernihiv, regional (polk) chancellery

== See also ==
- Doroshenko family
