= Sedniv settlement hromada =

Sedniv settlement hromada Седнівська селищна громада
- Hromada
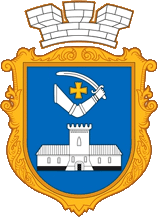
- Coat of arms
- Interactive map of Sedniv settlement hromada
- Country: Ukraine
- Oblast: Chernihiv
- Raion: Chernihiv

Area
  - Total: 213.0 km^{2} (82.2 sq mi)

Population (2020)
  - Total: 3,345
  - Density: 15.70/km^{2} (40.67/sq mi)
- CATOTTG code: UA74100350000075160
- Settlements: 8
- Rural settlements: 1
- Villages: 6
- Towns: 1
- Website: sednivska.gromada.org.ua

Sedniv settlement hromada (Ukrainian: Седнівська селищна громада) is a hromada of Ukraine, located in Chernihiv Raion, Chernihiv Oblast. The community is located within the Dnieper Lowland, between the Desna River basin. Its administrative center is the town of Sedniv.

It has an area of 213.0 square kilometres (82.2 mi^{2}) and a population of 3,345, as of 2020.

== Composition ==
The hromada includes 8 settlements: 1 town (Sedniv), 6 villages:

- Velikiy Dyrchyn
- Klochkiv
- Lashuky
- Makishyn
- Maly Dyrchyn
- Chernysh

And 1 rural-type settlement: Nove.

== Geography ==
The Sedniv settlement hromada is located in the east of Chernihiv raion. The territory of the hromada is located within the Dnieper Lowland, belong to the Dnieper basin. The hromada is located between the Desna River basin. The relief of the surface of the hromada is a lowland, slightly undulating plain, sometimes dissected by river valleys.

The climate of Sedniv settlement hromada is moderately continental, with warm summers and relatively mild winters. The average temperature in January is about -8°C, and in July - +19°C. The average annual precipitation ranges from 550 to 660 mm, with the highest precipitation in the summer period.

The most common are sod-podzolic and gray forest soils. The Sedniv settlement hromada is located in the natural zone of mixed forests, in Polissya. The main species in the forests are pine, oak, alder, ash, birch. Minerals – loam, peat, sand, brown coal.

The community is home to 17th-century historical sites: the Resurrection Church, the St. George Church and Lyzohubs' Stone House.

== Economy ==
=== Transportation ===
Sedniv settlement hromada is on Highway H28. The nearest railway station is located in the city of Chernihiv.

== See also ==
- List of hromadas of Ukraine
