= Governing Council of the Hetman Office =

Council in Ukraine established 1734

The Governing Council of the Hetman Office (Ukrainian: Правління гетьманського уряду) was a provisional form of the Collegium of Little Russia in the Hetmanate and Sloboda Ukraine that was established by Anna of Russia in 1734. It was subordinated to the Governing Senate in Saint-Petersburg.

After the death of Hetman Danylo Apostol in 1734, the Russian government did not allow to conduct elections of the Hetman of Zaporizhian Host. Instead, the post was replaced by an appointed council that consisted of three Russian officials and three officials of Cossack seniors (starshyna).

== Members of the council ==
=== Presidents ===
- 1734 - 1736 Prince Aleksei Shakhovskoy
- 1736 - 1738 Prince Ivan Baryatinskiy
- 1738 - 1738 Ivan Shipov (acting)
- 1738 - 1740 Alexander Rumyantsev
- 1740 - 1740 Ivan Shipov (acting)
- 1740 - 1741 Yakov Keyt
- 1741 - 1741 Ivan Neplyuyev
- 1741 - 1742 Alexander Buturlin
- 1742 - 1745 Ivan Bibikov
- 1745 - 1750 Mikhail Leontiev

=== Russian members ===
- Prince Aleksei Shakhovskoy (ru:Шаховской, Алексей Иванович)
- Prince Ivan Baryatinskiy (ru:Барятинский, Иван Фёдорович), a grandson of Yury Baryatinsky
- Colonel Guriev
- Mikhail Leontiev (ru:Леонтьев, Михаил Иванович)
- Ivan Bibikov (ru:Бибиков, Иван Иванович (сановник))
- Ivan Shipov
- Alexander Rumyantsev
- Yakov Keyt
- Ivan Neplyuyev
- Alexander Buturlin

=== Ukrainian members ===
- Quartermaster General Yakiv Lyzohub
- Treasurer General Andriy Markevych (uk:Маркевич Андрій Маркович)
- Aide-de-camp General Fedir Lysenko (uk:Лисенко Федір Іванович)
- Judge General Mykhailo Zabila (uk:Забіла Михайло Тарасович)

== See also ==
- Little Russian Office
- Hetman of Zaporizhian Host
- General Officer Staff (Hetmanate)
