= Ilya Lyzohub =

Ukrainian composer (1787–1867)

Illia Lyzohub
- Лизогуб Ілля Іванович
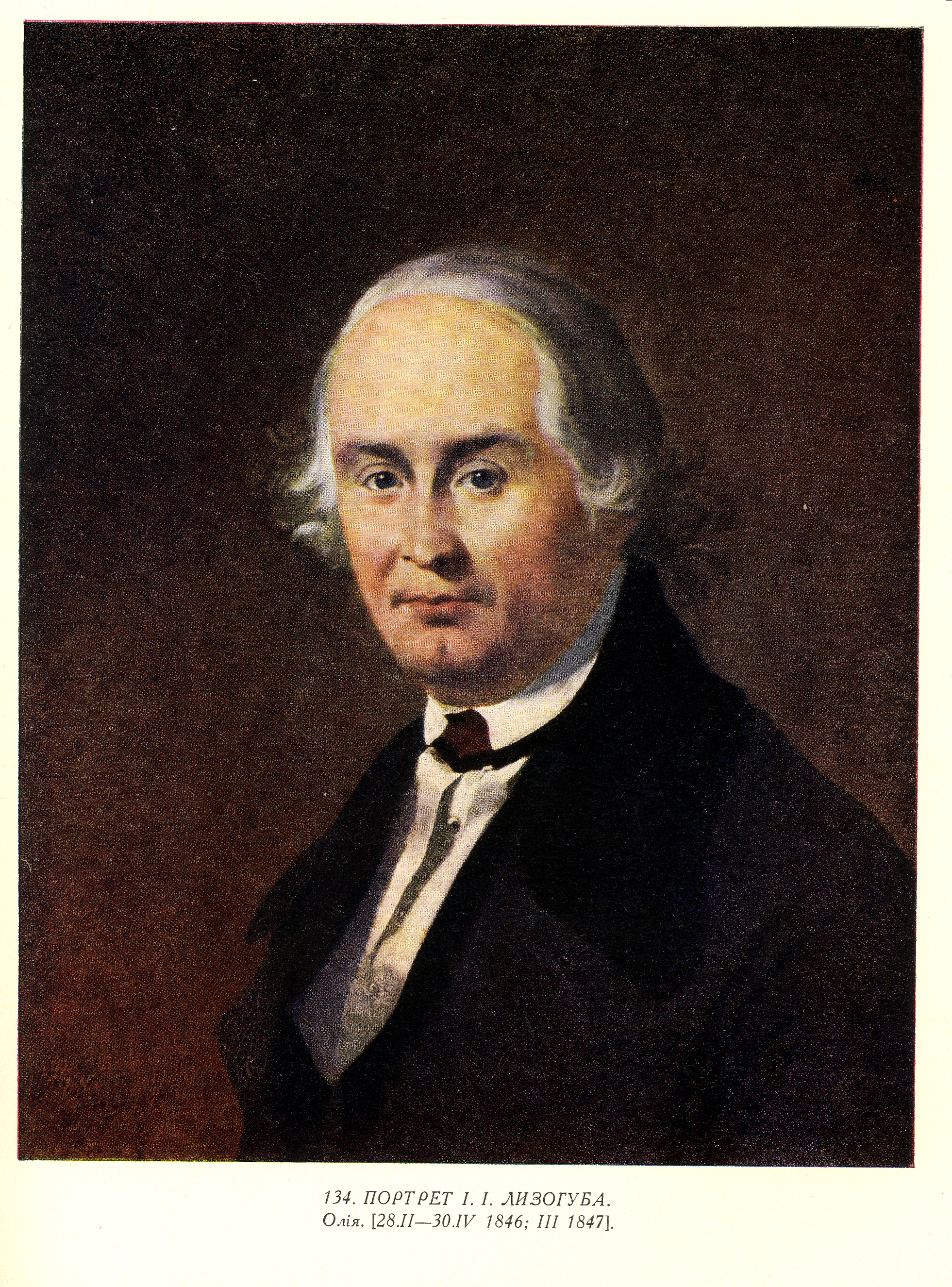
- Portrait by Taras Shevchenko
- Born: 23 October [O.S. 12 October] 1787; Kulykivka, Chernihiv Governorate, Russian Empire
- Died: 1867; Chernihiv, Chernihiv Governorate, Russian Empire
- Works: Cello sonata

Illia Ivanovych Lyzohub Russian: Илья́ Ива́нович Лизогу́б, Ukrainian: Ілля́ Іва́нович Лизогу́б, (23 October [O.S. 1 April] 1787 – 1867), was a Ukrainian patron of the arts, composer-cellist, and pianist who founded an influential artistic circle in Sedniv. A friend and patron of the poet Taras Shevchenko. In his youth, he served as an aide-de-camp to the Governor-General of Little Russia, Nikolai Repnin-Volkonsky.

== Biography ==
=== Early years ===
Part of the Lyzohub family, he was born on 23 October 1787 in the village of Kulykivka, Chernihiv Governorate, Russian Empire (now Ukraine).

=== Military career ===
From 25 November 1807, Lyzohub served as a corporal in the Life Guards Jager Regiment. He took part in the Austro-Polish War of 1809. For the courage and bravery shown in the Battle of Borodino (7 September [O.S. 26 August] 1812), in which his regiment repeatedly attacked the French cavalry, he was awarded a golden sword. During the War of the Sixth Coalition (March 1813 – May 1814), he received the Order of Saint Vladimir, 4th class, after the Battle of Bautzen, and the Order of Saint Anna, 4th class, after the Battle of Leipzig. After the Battle of Leipzig, he was briefly an orderly officer for General Dmitry Golitsyn and then for Crown Prince Eugene of Württemberg. He became an adjutant of the General Governors in Little Russia, Nikolai Repnin-Volkonsky on 26 May 1819. On 14 August 1819 he was promoted to the rank of captain.

=== Retirement ===
On 23 January 1821, Lyzohub retired as a colonel and settled in his Sedniv estate in Chernihiv Governorate, which he transformed into an important cultural center. He died in 1867 in Sedniv.

=== Philanthropy ===
He was a close friend and supporter of the poet Taras Shevchenko, whom he at times helped financially. The friendly bond remained during Shevchenko's exile, during which they corresponded with each other (the letters have not survived). Lyzohub bought some of Shevchenko's drawings. Together with his brother Andrii, the writer Leo Tolstoy and the military commander Andriy Gudovich, Lyzohub asked the governor general of the Orenburg Governorate, Vasily Perovsky, to ease Shevchenko's prison conditions.

In Sednev, in 1846, the artist executed a portrait of Lyzohub in oil, now kept in the National Academy of Sciences of Ukraine.

=== Musical career ===
Lyzohub was a talented musician and composer. He is known as the composer of a cello sonata in G minor, the earliest example this genre in Ukrainian music.

== Family ==
Lysohub was the uncle of Fedir Lyzohub, who became the Ukrainian head of government. He was married to Elisabeth, the daughter of the Russian military leader Ivan Gudovich. The marriage remained childless.

== Sources ==
- Chandler, David G. (1966). The Campaigns of Napoleon. New York: The MacMillan Company. ISBN 978-0-0252-3660-8.
- Kuehn, John T. (26 October 2008). "The Battle of Borodino: Napoleon Against Kutuzov (review)". The Journal of Military History. 72 (4): 1295–1296. doi:10.1353/jmh.0.0141. ISSN 1543-7795. S2CID 161057504.
- Modzalevsky, Vadim Lvovich (1912). Малороссийский родословник [Little Russian Genealogy] (in Russian). Vol. 3. Kyiv.
- Samokhina, Natalia (2006). ""Родина Лизогубів та її внесок у розвиток культури" Самохіна Наталія" [The Lyzogub family and its contribution to the development of culture]. Treasury of Ukrainian culture: Collection of scientific papers (in Ukrainian) (7). Chernihiv: Chernihiv Historical Museum named after V.V. Tarnovsky: 42–58.
