= Kobyzewicz family =

Family

Kobyzewicz family Кобызевичи Chodyka-Kobyzewicz, Chodyka-Krynicki
- boyars/szlachta
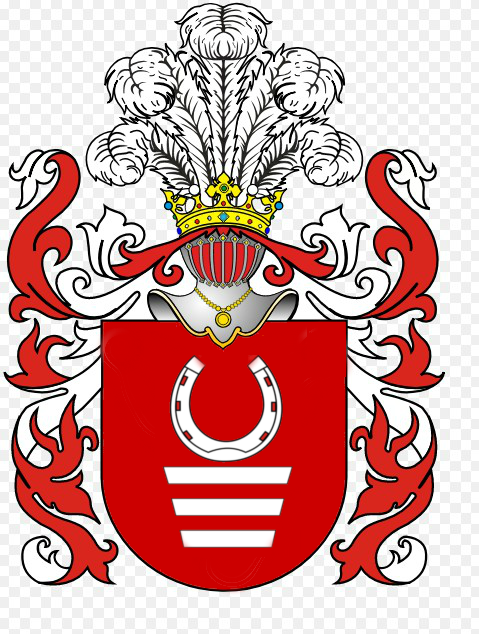
- Coat-of-arms granted to the Kobyzewicz-Krynicki family, 1589

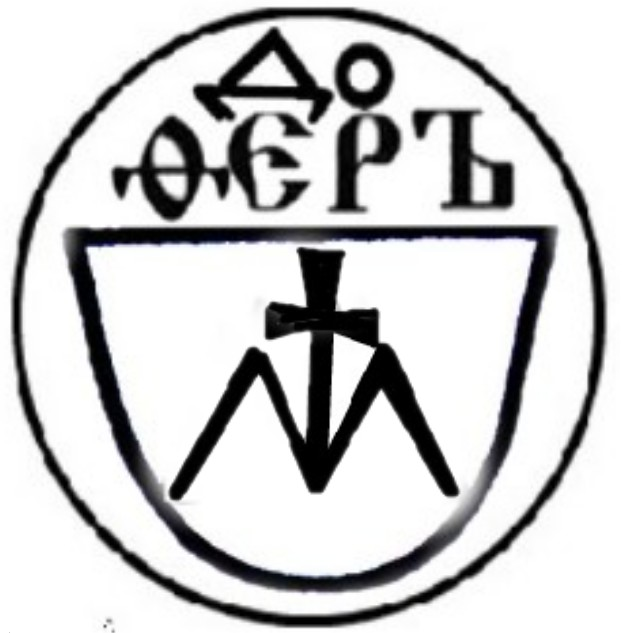
- Seal of boyar Fyodor Kobyzewicz with family arms, 1553.
- Founded: early 1500s
- Estate(s): Krenichi, Kyiv Oblast, Ukraine Basan, Chernihiv Oblast, Ukraine Bikiv (Bykov), Chernihiv Oblast, Ukraine

The Kobyzewicz family (Polish, also: Kobyziewiczowie; Russian: Кобызе́вичи, Ukrainian: Кобизе́вичі) was a boyar family of the Grand Duchy of Lithuania in the 16th—17th centuries. The family's cadet branch, Kobyzewicz-Krynicki, received the status of the Polish szlachta. The family was known for their active role in the history of Kyiv. The Kobyzewicz family is claimed to be paternal to the Lyzohub family of the Cossack Hetmanate.

== History ==
It is currently unknown where exactly the Kobyzewicz family hailed from. The family was based near Mozyr (modern Belarus) in the late 15th century. In the early 1500s, two brothers, boyars Fyodor (the elder) and Ivan Kobyzewicz, inherited a landed estate (‘a third of Bokowszczina, the folwarks of Poszkowszczina and Czortkowszczina’), which was to pass to Fyodor Kobyzewicz under majorat. The younger brother, Ivan, had to move out. After having stayed at Mozyr for some time, he moved to Kyiv, where were based some of his relations, including an old boyar of Kyiv Pechersk Monastery also named Ivan Kobyzewicz. Upon arriving in Kyiv, around the 1520s, Ivan Kobyzewicz made a contribution to Kyiv Pechersk Monastery for his late kinsmen to be commemorated in its earliest known synodik, under the name of Ivan Kobyzev from Mozyr''. His commemoration list gives names of 41 relatives, including a few clerics (3 ascetics (schema monks), two monks and one priest) and some Prince Mikhail'. All of them were Orthodox Christians.

Volodymyr Antonovych, a 19th-century Ukrainian historian, argued that the family was descended from a Tatar named Kobyz, who was supposedly captured by Duke Vytautas in the battle of Kulikovo (1380) and put in the Castle of Mozyr. However, the castle at Mozyr was first mentioned only in 1519, while a wooden stronghold (detinets) appeared in its place in the late 15th century. V. Antonowicz did not provide any reference to documented sources, but based his assumptions solely on his association of the family's name with the Turkic musical instrument kobyz. The historian was not aware that the family had any branch other than the Mozyr one. Currently, a more comprehensive study on the family has been provided by the Ukrainian historian Natalya Bilous.

Later on, former Mozyr boyar Ivan Kobyzewicz became a merchant. He had two sons: Ustin, nicknamed Fiz, and Bogdan, both involved in trade. Ustin Fiz Kobyzewicz (d. 1578) was the first in the family to have become a member of the upper chamber (rada) of the Kyiv city council (magistrat) (1564—1578).

In the 1550s, Fyodor Kobyzewicz also moved to Kyiv where he was engaged in trade. In 1557 he returned to Mozyr where he lived on his estate until his death in 1569. After his death, the estate passed down to his elder son, Kuzma, while all the rest, including his widow, Sofia, were left with small inheritance, mainly movable property. It stirred up a bitter conflict in the family. Soon, the second son, Wasily Kobyzewicz, while his brother Kuzma was absent on his service in Kyiv, robbed the estate and took away everything of value Then, together with his brother Fyodor, he moved to Kyiv.

In Kyiv, brothers Wasily and Fyodor Kobyzewicz established themselves amongst the local elite and started the new branch nicknamed 'Chodyka-Krynicki'. As for their nickname, Chodyka (also spelled as Hodyka) N. Bilous connects it to a different Kyivan family that died out during the plague of 1572. At the same time, she points out that their father, boyar Fyodor Kobyzewicz was already known by this nickname in Kyiv. According to the historian, hodyka meant "a newcomer".

According to V. Antonowicz, in 1572, during plague, Wasily Kobyzewicz (d. 1616) saved the daughter of the local wealthy merchant, Efrosinia Mitkovna, left alone with her little brother after their parents’ death. Soon they married, and Wasily Kobyzewicz became the guardian of a large fortune. However, in the will of her mother, Tatyana Kruglikovna, dated by July 7, 1572, it says that she had more surviving children, and who died where actually her husband and son, Konsha. She left most of her possessions to her elder married daughter Olena, son Fyodor (she had one more son thus named), and grandson Mikhail. What she left to her other daughter Efrosinia and her husband Wasily Kobyzewicz was "Zankovskaya warehouse at the Kyiv marketplace and two silver chalices", as well as a fur coat, a few gowns, pearls and jewells. Moreover, by the testament, in case her son Fyodor died, all he inherited was to go to either of two sons-in-law, Ignaty Bogdanowicz Malikowicz (husband of her elder daughter) or Wasily Kobyzewicz.

In the 1570s, Wasily Kobyzewicz seized the estates of Burgomaster Andrey Koszkoldeewicz (the father-in-law of his brother Fyodor) by court action: Basan and Bykov. In 1586 he purchased the village of Krenichi, near Kyiv, since when this branch of the Kobyzewicz family acquired the name of Krenicki, also spelled as Krynicki. Wasily Kobyzewicz-Krynicki was the owner of multiple estates near Kyiv and Chernigov, including two towns. However, Bykov was then an empty land where in the ancient Rus there was a stronghold. In 1605 he received a patent from King Sigismund III Vasa allowing him to build a town and a castle there and launch trade.

On March 27, 1589, at Warsaw General Sejm, brothers Wasily, Fyodor and Iev Kobyzewicz received the status of polish szlachta and a coat-of-arms for participation in the war with Muscovy of 1578—1581 during the reign of King Stefan Batory. W. Antonowicz claimed they Wasily Kobyzewicz faked this fact by stating that they were involved in trade in Kyiv at this time. However, the Russian State Archive of Ancient acts has documents according to which Mozyr ziemianin Wasily Kobyzewicz sent two mounted servants to the troops, which was the privilege of Lithuanian and Polish landed gentry who did not wish to perform military service themselves.

The right for the status of szlachta (the family originated from the boyars) was challenged by Janusz Ostogski, who in association with the assistant of the Kyivan voivode and later the judge of the Kyiv Powiat, Jan Aksak, sued Wasily Kobyzewicz twice in 1609 and in 1615, in order to take over his estates by proving that his nobility was fabricated and accusing him of a murder. Yet, the Kobyzewicz-Krynicki family was officially confirmed as szlachta and their coat-of-arms was listed in the heraldic books, such as Poczet Herbow Szlachty by Wacław Potocki published in 1696.

In 1609 Wasily Kobyzewicz became the treasurer (skarbnik) of the Kyiv Powiat.

Fyodor Kobyzewicz was a member of the upper chamber (rada) of the Kyiv city council in 1587–1601. In 1612 he was elected Vogt of Kyiv. The office of vogt in Kyiv was permanent and occupied until death. He was an active advocate of taxing the city residents to maintain the fortress. He had provided many new privileges for the city, i.e. the free use of surrounding woods, the free fishing on the Dniepr and its tributaries, annulment of the obligation to report to the royal inspectors for the income received from taverns. However, as an Uniat he was opposed by the anti-Polish party. In 1625 a few Cossack troops attacked the city. Fyodor Kobyzewicz together with some other officials was kidnapped and drowned in the Dnieper river near the village of Tripolie.

His son, Josef Kobyzewicz-Krynicki, was the vogt of Kyiv in 1633–1641. He acquired three significant privileges for Kyiv: the free trade, the right to elect the vogt, liberation from the trial by the voivode and the establishment of the trial by the vogt. His younger brother, Andrzei, was the vogt of Kyiv in 1644–1651. As the vogt, he had to persecute those suspected in collaboration with the Cossacks. As a result, he was threatened his office and even his life. In 1651 he abandoned the city with Hetman Janusz Radziwill.

In 1652 the widow of Fyodor Kobyzewicz-Krynicki, Anna Sadkowska-Krynicka (daughter of Wacław (Stanisław) Sadkowski, Greek-Catholic (Uniat) suffragan bishop of Kyiv in 1616 - 1626), escaped from Basan to Volhynia with her children. On their way their train was robbed by a Cossack gang of 500 men. The Cossacks killed their servants and stole all the values and property documents. However, later, Hetman Ivan Vyhovsky returned 'the Basan castle and the volost' to the family.

== Coats-of-arms ==
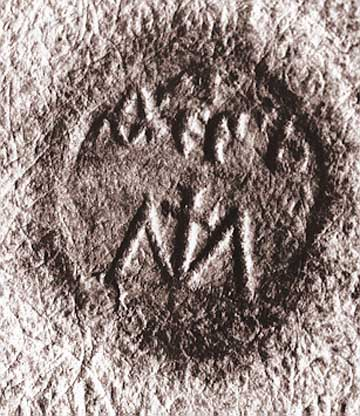
Kobyzewicz family arms on the seal of Boyar Fyodor Kobyziewicz, 1553. From the collection of Sheremetiev Museum, Kyiv.

Kobyzewicz family arms

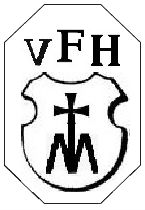
Seal of Wasily Chodyka-Kobyzewicz with his family's emblem, 2nd half of the 16th century. The original silver seal is part of the Kyivan Sheremetiev Museum's collection.

The silver seal of Wasily Kobyzewicz-Chodyka, stored at Sheremetiev Museum in Kyiv, features a shield with the letter M and a cross over it, resembling the Masalski coat-of-arms. The same emblem is present on the seal of his father, Mozyr boyar Fyodor Kobyzewicz, dated by 1553. Historian Natalia Bilous believes that this seal displays the family's ancient arms. Ustin Fiz Kobyzewicz also had a signet ring with an arms, which is mentioned in his will; however, it has not survived to date.

This coat-of-arms shall, nevertheless, not be attributed to the Massalski princely house. It is believed that it originates in Poland and has many similarities in the medieval Polish heraldry. The identical arms with the letter M with a cross was used by other Lithuanian noble families, such as Semaszko, which was first mentioned in 1429. Some Polish researchers consider this arms a version of Mogila coat-of-arms. Others point to the similarity with the early form of the Unila coat-of-arms that displayed a capital M and a cross and is dated by1388. The seal of Sandomir voivode Pakosław, dated by 1228, also displays an M with small a cross high above.

In 1434 Grand Duke of Lithuania Sigismund Kęstutaitis gave the Eastern Orthodox boyars the right to use Polish noble coats-of-arms. This means that the Kobyzewicz family had already been part of Lithuanian szlachta in the early 16th century.

Kobyzewicz-Krynicki arms

The coat-of-arms of the Kobyzewicz-Krynicki family as described in the patent of 1589, was based on Korczak, depicting the three bars (Polish: wręby) and a horseshoe on the red shield. The modern image of the family's coat-of-arm created by Tadeusz Gejl, is based on the illustration from the armorial by Juliusz Ostrowski (Polish: Juliusz Ostrowski. Księga herbowa rodów polskich. Cz. 1. S. 284) where it is named 'Krynicki I". This coat-of-arms was first described by Wacław Potocki (1621 — 1696) in his book The Armorial of nobility of the Polish Crown and the Grand Duchy of Lithuania (Polish: 'Poczet Herbow Szlachty Korony Polskiey Y Wielkiego Xiestwa Litewskiego') (1696).

== Krynicki of the Sas and Korab arms ==
The Kobyzewicz-Krynicki family (also referred to in sources as "Krynicki na Basaniach", by the name of their main 17th-century estate), should not be confused with Polish noble families named Krynicki that have different descent. The Polish historian Tadeusz M. Trajdos does not see any genealogical link between the Krynickis of the Sas and Korab arms with the Ruthenian Krynicki family (a branch of the Kobyzewicz clan).

== Lyzohub family ==
Some 19th-century Ukrainian historians, such as A. Lazarevsky, had assigned the descent of the Lyzohubs to the Kobyzewicz family. This myth was based on the claims of the Lyzohub family seeking Russian nobility in the late 18th century. In 1799, cornet Jakov Lyzohub submitted papers to the Chernigov Nobility Assembly in order to prove nobility (dvorianstvo). Amongst the documents he provided was a patent of nobility supposedly given by King John II Casimir Vasa to Cossack Colonel Ivan Lyzohub in 1661. In that document Ivan Lyzohub was claimed to have the last name of Kobyzewicz. Another document the Lyzohubs presented was a patent of nobility purportedly given to their assumed progenitor Ivan Kobyzewicz-Lyzohub by Jan Casimir Vasa in 1642. The Ukrainian researcher, Erwin Miden, has debunked the myth in his study on the Lyzohub family. In particular, in his article on the Colonel Ivan Lyzohub, he provided reference to the records of the Warsaw General Sejm of 1661, which misses any mention of Ivan Lyzohub. As for the paper dated by 1642, this particular ennoblement could not take place as King John II Casimir Vasa first entered Polish throne only in 1648.

== Notable members ==
- Wasily Fyodorowicz Kobyzewicz (Chodyka-Krynicki) (d. 1616) was the treasurer (skarbnik) of Kiev Powiat (since 1609), the member of upper chamber (rada) of the Kyiv city council.
- Fyodor Fyodorowicz Kobyzewicz (Chodyka-Krynicki) was the vogt of Kyiv (1612—1625).
- Fyodor (Theodor) Kobyzewicz-Krynicki (d. 1641), son of Wasily Kobyzewicz, was the podstoli of Chernigov (1633—1641). In 1638 he was the commissar of the Sejm for demarcation between the Kiev and Chernigov Voivodeships. His son, Franciszek, served in the military.
- Josef Kobyzewicz-Krynicki (Chodyka) was the vogt of Kyiv (1633—1641).
- Andrzei Kobyzewicz-Krynicki (Chodyka) was the vogt of Kyiv (1644—1651).
- Stefan (Stephan) Kobyzewicz-Krynicki, the son of podstoli Theodor Krynicki, was the cup-bearer (czesnik) of Zhytomir (1691—1696). In 1674 he participated in elections of King Jan III from the Voivodeship of Kyiv.

== In fiction ==
- Wasily and Fyodor Kobyzewicz-Chodyka-Krynicki became villains in the novels by Mikhail Staritsky: the First Hawks (Russian: Первые коршуны; 1893) and The red devil (Russian: Червонный дьявол; 1896).
- The Kobyzewicz-Krynicki branch is mentioned in the novel With Fire and Sword (Polish: Ogniem i Mieczem) by Henryk Sienkiewicz in the episode about a peasant revolt in their estate of Basan during the Khmelnitski Uprising. This episode was based on the account of Bogusław Kazimierz Maskiewicz who mentioned that Prince Jeremi Wiśniowiecki, indeed, stayed at Basan on May 16, 1648.
