= Doroshenko family =

Ukrainian family

Doroshenko
- Mykhailo Doroshenko coat of arms
- Members: Mykhailo Doroshenko; Petro Doroshenko
- Connected families: Lyzohub

Doroshenko is a Ukrainian family of the Cossack Hetmanate. Two of its members were Hetmans of Ukrainian Cossacks.

== Notable family members ==
- Mykhailo Doroshenko (?–after 1628), senior of the Registered Cossacks
- Petro Doroshenko (1627–1698), Hetman of Zaporizhian Host
- Dmytro Doroshenko (1882–1951), Ukrainian politician, government official, historian (real last name Klymchenko-Doroshenko)
Petro Doroshenko coat of arms
