= Lyubetska Sotnia =

Lyubetska Sotnia Любецька сотня
- Active: 1656 - 1784
- Country: Cossack Hetmanate
- Type: Cossack Sotnia
- Garrison/HQ: Liubech, Ukraine
- Engagements: Khmelnytsky Uprising; Russo-Polish War (1654–67)

Commanders
- Notable commanders: Vodovolenko Petro; Vnuchko Sava

The Lyubetska Sotnia (Company) (Ukrainian: Любецька сотня, romanized: Lyubetska sotnya) was one of the sixteen territorial-administrative and military units of the Chernihiv Regiment of the Cossack Hetmanate. The sotnia's center was the small town of Liubech, now in the Chernihiv Oblast of northeast Ukraine.

The sotnia was created in 1656 and occupied area on the left bank of the Dnieper River. 116 settlers lived in the sotnia at the time of its founding. The territory of the sotnia was bordered by the Royiska, Bilouska and Slabynska sotnias to the east, and Osterska Sotnia of Kyiv Regiment to the south.

In 1782 the sotnia was abolished by the order Empress Catherine the Great as a territorial-administrative district. All of the sotnia's territories were included into Chernihiv namestnichestvo. In 1784 it was disbanded as military unit.

== Commanders ==
Chief in the sotnia was sotnik (sotnia's commander, captain).

List of sotnyks:

- Vodovolenko Petro (1656)
- Vnuchko Sava (1656-1657)
