= Uliana Iskrytska =

Uliana Iskrytska (Ukrainian: Уляна Іскрицька) (?–1742), was the Hetmana of the Cossack Hetmanate by marriage to Danylo Apostol, Hetman of Ukraine (r. 1727–1734). She was known for her charity and donations to the church, and occasionally played a political role.
