= Lyzohubs' Stone House =

17th century manor, oldest stone residential building on Left-Bank Ukraine

- Кам'яниця Лизогубів
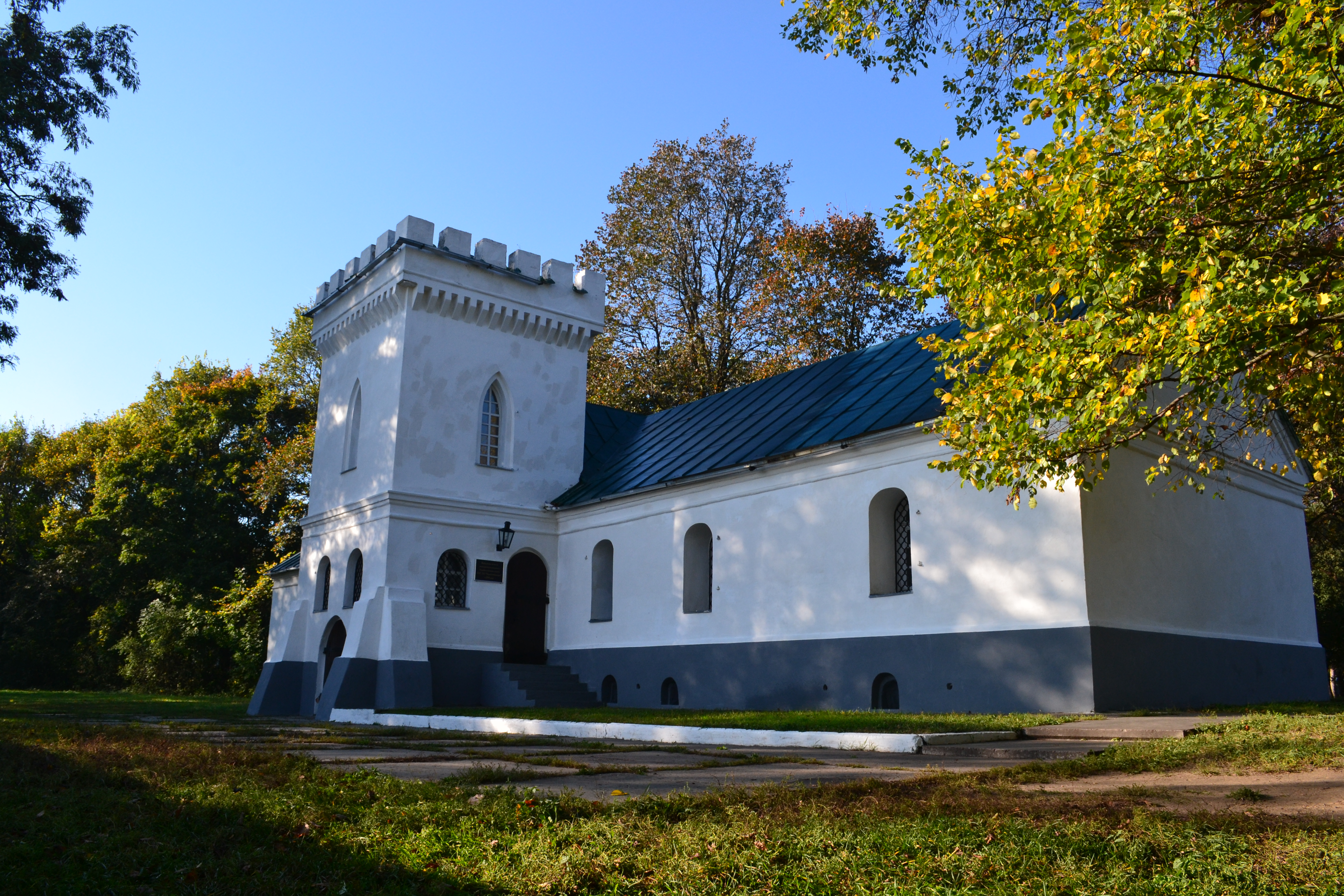
- View from the northeast

General information
- Location: Lyzohuba Street, Sedniv, Chernihiv Oblast, 15522
- Coordinates: 51°38′29.94″N 31°34′3.9″E
- Construction started: 1690

Immovable Monument of National Significance of Ukraine
- Official name: Кам'яниця (Stone House)
- Type: Architecture
- Reference no.: 250110/1

The Lyzohubs' Stone House is a manor in Sedniv, Chernihiv Oblast, Ukraine. It is the oldest stone residential building on Left-bank Ukraine. It was built for Yakiv Lyzohub of Chernihiv Regiment, member of the Lyzohub family.

Constructed in the 17th century, the building is a Ukrainian architectural monument.

== History ==
The building was constructed in 1690 on the territory of the estate of the Chernihiv colonel Yakiv Lyzohub by his order by the same artisan team that was building the Church of the Nativity of the Virgin Mary in Sedniv at the same time. The roof was originally covered with shingles. In the second quarter of the nineteenth century, instead of a porch, a tower with Gothic windows, fortified by buttresses, was built on the main façade, crowned with a band of decorative mashikuls and merlon teeth. The house was painted in 1846 by Taras Shevchenko, who was visiting the then owner of the estate, Andriy Lyzohub. In September 1930, the monument was examined and measured in detail by the monumentologist Stefan Taranushenko. The house was partially destroyed in 1941–1943 during the Second World War. The restoration was completed in 1967.

After the restoration (1967), a beer bar was opened in the building, which angered the public. After a while, the bar was closed and the building was left without an owner, which led to its impoverishment: windows were smashed, the floor and doors were torn off.

In 2001, the building was restored by the Chernihivoblenergo Electricity Company to mark the tenth anniversary of Ukraine's independence.
