= Little Russia Office =

The Little Russia Office (Russian: Приказ Малыя Россіи) was a Muscovite state agency (Prikaz) and administrative body of the Tsardom of Muscovy in charge of affairs connected with the Cossack Hetmanate and the Left-bank Ukraine. Created on 10 January 1663 [O.S. 31 December 1662], the office existed until 1722 when it was transformed into the Collegium of Little Russia and moved to Hlukhiv. The Little Russia Office was part of the bigger Ambassadorial Office and since 1671 was chaired by the head of the office.

Located in Moscow, since 1707 the agency had its resident general in the hetman's capital. Conditions of the office were expressed in articles (or statutes; Russian: статьи) which were concluded with every newly elected Hetman.

== Overview ==
Noticeable is the fact that the Little Russia Prikase was created about a week later after the official confirmation of Hetman Pavlo Teteria in Chyhyryn after he was elected the Hetman of Zaporizhian Host earlier in October 1662. The prikase sanctioned an alternative elections of hetman which led to election of the Kosh Otaman Ivan Briukhovetsky as another Hetman of Zaporizhian Host in Nizhyn in June 1663 (see Chorna rada of 1663). The creation of dual hetmanship conditionally divided Ukraine along the Dnieper which later in 1667 saw its virtual and legal realization at the Treaty of Andrusovo.

== Composition and functions ==
The prikase consisted of four clerks (dyaks) and 15-40 assistants (podyachny). It controlled the Hetman and its officer council implementing a prikase-voivode system of the Russian administration in Ukraine. The prikase prevented any attempts that were undertaken to succeed Ukraine from Russia in its early stage. In 1722 it was transformed into the Collegium of Little Russia suspending next Hetman elections indefinitely.

=== Primary ===
- maintained ties on the tsar's behalf with the hetman's government and representatives in Moscow
- kept the tsar informed of developments
- gathered intelligence
- supervised and supplied the Muscovite garrisons in several of the Hetmanate's towns
- mitigated conflicts between them and the people
- oversaw the construction of fortresses and bridges
- looked after the interests of Russian merchants in Ukraine
- issued travel permits
- settled jurisdictional disputes

=== Additionally ===
- monitored the administrative institutions of the Hetman state
- monitored the hetman's correspondence with foreign rulers
- reviewed the hetman's appointments
- interfered in the affairs of the Orthodox church in Ukraine

== Heads ==
- 1663–1667 Boyar Pyotr Saltykov, dyak Ivan Mikhailov
- 1667–1668 Boyar Afanasy Ordin-Nashchokin (part of Ambassadorial Prikaz)
- 1668–1676 Council Courtier Artamon Matveyev, dyaks Grigoriy Bogdanov and Yakov Pozdyshev
  - since 1670 part of Ambassadorial Prikaz

== Articles ==
- 1654 March Articles
- 1659 Pereyaslav Articles
- Moscow Articles of 1665

== See also ==
- Grigory Romodanovsky
- Prikaz
- Governing Council of the Hetman Office
