= Yakiv Lyzohub =

Yakiv Yukhymovych Lyzohub (Ukrainian: Яків Юхимович Лизогуб) was a military and political figure of the Cossack Hetmanate and a member of a well known Cossack family of Lyzohub.

He was born in a family of Chernihiv Colonel Yukhym Yakovych Lyzohub and Lyubov Petrivna Doroshenko. Yakiv Lyzohub was a grandson of Hetman Petro Doroshenko. He graduated from the Kyiv-Mohyla Academy that in the 19th century was transformed into the Kyiv Theological Academy on the order of the Russian Holy Synod.

In 1713-28 Lyzohub was a Bunchuk General.

In 1723-24 he along with Colonel Danylo Apostol and Yesavul General Vasyl Zhurakovsky was imprisoned by Peter the Great in the Peter and Paul Fortress as a members of Pavlo Polubotok's party. After the release Lyzohub was forced to live for sometime in Saint Petersburg.

During the hetman rule of Danylo Apostol, in 1728 he was promoted to the rank of Quartermaster General. After the death of Danylo Apostol in 1734, Lyzohub was placed as an Appointed Hetman in the Governing Council of the Hetman Office which was controlled by Russian residents in Ukraine Prince Alexei Shakhovskiy at first and later - Prince Ivan Baryatinskiy, Alexander Rumyantsev and others. Lyzohub at that time commanded corps of Ukrainian Cossacks, performed functions as hetman and participated in number of military campaigns along with the Russian field marshal Burkhard Christoph von Münnich (War of the Polish Succession and raid of Crimean Khanate in 1736–37).

After couple of "palace coup d'etat", Lyzohub vouched for reinstating the institute of Hetman of Ukrainian Cossacks.

Lyzohub had two brothers Andriy and Semen.

== See also ==
- Governing Council of the Hetman Office
