= Royiska Sotnia =

Royiska Sotnia Роїська сотня
- Active: 1659 - 1784
- Country: Cossack Hetmanate
- Type: Cossack Sotnia
- Garrison/HQ: Royishche, Ukraine
- Engagements: Khmelnytsky Uprising; Russo-Polish War (1654–67)

Commanders
- Notable commanders: Foma Rashenko; Ivan Rashevsky; Mykola Hrembetsky; Petro Stefanovych; Yakiv Bakurynsky; Leotii Bakurynsky; Ivan Nekhaievsky

The Royiska Sotnia (Company) (Ukrainian: Роїська сотня, romanized: Royis’ka sotnya) was one of the sixteen territorial-administrative and military unit of the Chernihiv Regiment of the Cossack Hetmanate. The sotnia's center was the village of Royishche, now in the Chernihiv Oblast of north-east Ukraine.

The sotnia was created in 1659 and occupied area almost 593,7 km^{2} (1730) on banks Stryzhen River, right tributary Desna River. On the territory of the sotnia were 32 settlers, as military unit it numbered from 100 to 707 registered Cossacks. The territory of the sotnia bordered by the Horodnyanska Sotnia to the east, Bilouska Sotnia by the south, and Lyubetska Sotnia to the west.

In 1782 the sotnia was abolished by the order Empress Catherine the Great as territorial-administrative district. All of the sotnia's territories were included into Chernihiv namestnichestvo. In 1784 it was disbanded as military unit.

== Commanders ==
Chief in the sotnia was sotnyk (sotnia's commander, captain).

List of sotnyks:

- Foma Rashenko (1659–1660)
- Ivan Rashevskyj (1672–1676)
- Stepan Shakhutskyj (1676–1677)
- Mykola Hrembetskyj (1677–1687)
- Petro Stefanovych (1693–1699–1716)
- Yakiv Bakurynskyj (1716–1738)
- Leotij Bakurynskyj (1738–1760)
- Ivan Nehayevskyj (1760)
- Yakiv Krupyanskyj (1760–1777)
- Petro Krasovskyj (1777–1782)
