= Chernigov Regiment =

Chernihiv Regiment Чернігівський полк Черниговский полк
- Active: 1648 - 1782
- Country: Cossack Hetmanate, Polish–Lithuanian Commonwealth, Russian Empire
- Type: Regiment
- Size: 7 sotnias, 997 Cossacks (1649); 16 sotnias (18th century)
- Garrison/HQ: Chernihiv, Zaporozhian Host, Polish–Lithuanian Commonwealth, Russian Empire

Commanders
- Notable commanders: Stepan Pobodailo; Demian Mnohohrishny; Ivan Samoilovych; Pavlo Polubotok

Chernihiv Regiment Чернігівський полк (Ukrainian)
- Regiment of Cossack Hetmanate
- 1648–1782
- Coat of arms

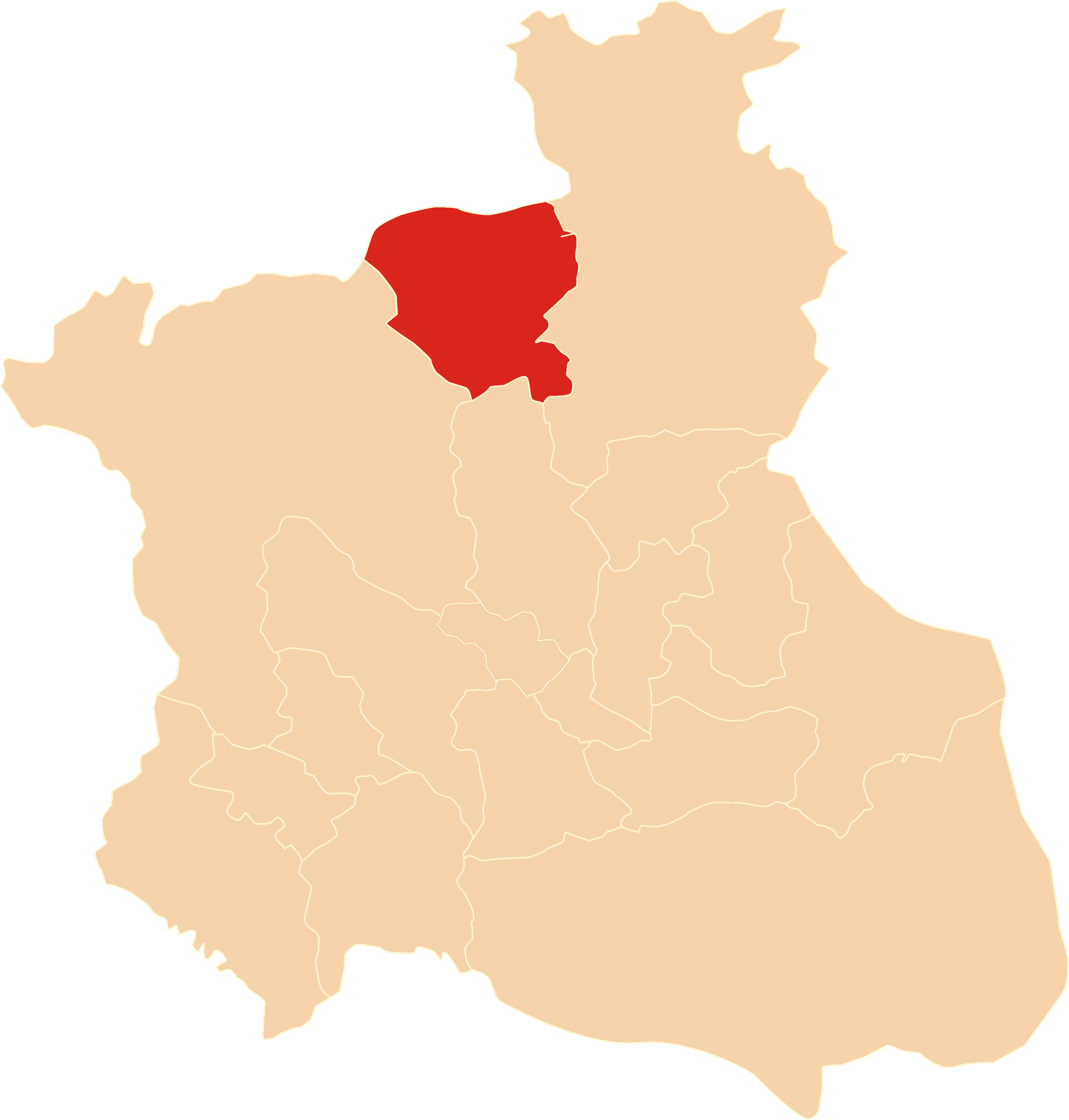
- Chernihiv Regiment (red) in the Cossack Hetmanate in 1660
- Capital: Chernihiv
- History
  - Khmelnytsky Uprising: 1648
  - Creation of Chernigov viceroyalty: 1782
| Preceded by | Succeeded by |
| Chernihiv Voivodeship | Chernigov Governorate |
- Today part of: Ukraine

The Chernigov Regiment (also known as Chernihiv Regiment or the Regiment of Chernigov, Ukrainian: Чернігівський полк, romanized: Chernihivs'kyj polk, Russian: Черниговский полк, romanized: Chernigovskij polk) was one of ten territorial-administrative subdivisions of the Registered Zaporozhian Host, later incorporated as an autonomy in Tsardom of Russia. In 1781, the regiment was officially abolished, and territory was reformed into the Government of Chernigov, Russian Empire.

The Chernihiv Regiment was founded in 1648 during the Khmelnytsky Uprising. Following the signing of the Treaty of Zboriv in 1649 it consisted of 7 sotnias, and had 997 registered cossacks. After Treaty of Pereyaslav very much parts of regiment was included to Nizhyn Regiment. With 1659 in regiment started creation new sotnias. After reformation Chernihiv Regiment in 1782 consisted of 16 sotnias: Bereznynska, Bilouska, Chernihiv regimental, Horodnyanska, Kyselivska, Lyubetska, Menska, Ponurnynska, Royiska, Sednivska, Slabynska, Sosnytska, Stolynska, Synyavska, Volynska, Vybelska,

According to documents of 1764, the regiment consisted of 9,838 Land Cossacks, and 19,810 Cossack helpers.

== Administrative divisions ==
According to the 1649 Registry of the Zaporozhian Host the regiment included the following sotnias:

- Borzna
- Bakhmach
- Baturyn
- Konotop
- Sosnytsia
- Ivanhorod

== Colonels ==
- Martyn Nebaba (Мартин Небаба) (1649–1651)
- Stepan Podobailo (Степан Пободайло) (1651–1653)
- Ivan Wybelskyi (Іван Вибельський) (1653–1657, 1661)
- Onykii Sylych (Оникій Силич) (1657–1663)
- Demian Mnohohrishnyi (Дем'ян Многогрішний) (1665–1669)
- Ivan Lysenko (Іван Лисенко) (1669–1671)
- Vasyl Mnohohrishnyi (Василь Многогрішний) (1671–1672)
- Vasyl Dunin-Borkowskyi (Василь Дунін-Борковський) (1672–1685)
- Ivan Samoylovych (Іван Самойлович) (1685–1687)
- Iakiv Lyzohub (Яків Лизогуб) (1687–1698)
- Iukhym Lyzohub (Юхим Лизогуб) (1698–1704)
- Pavlo Polubotok (Павло Полуботок) (1706–1722)

In the 18th century the position of colonel of the Chernihiv regiment was held by the protégés of the imperial government:

- Myhailo Bohdanov (Михайло Богданов) (1723–1735)
- Volodymyr Izmailov (Володимир Ізмайлов) (1736–1749)
- Ivan Bozhych (Іван Божич) (1749–1762), belonged to a noble Serbian family Božić.
- Petro Myloradovych (Петро Милорадович) (1762–1782), belonged to a noble Serbian family Miloradović.

== Gallery ==
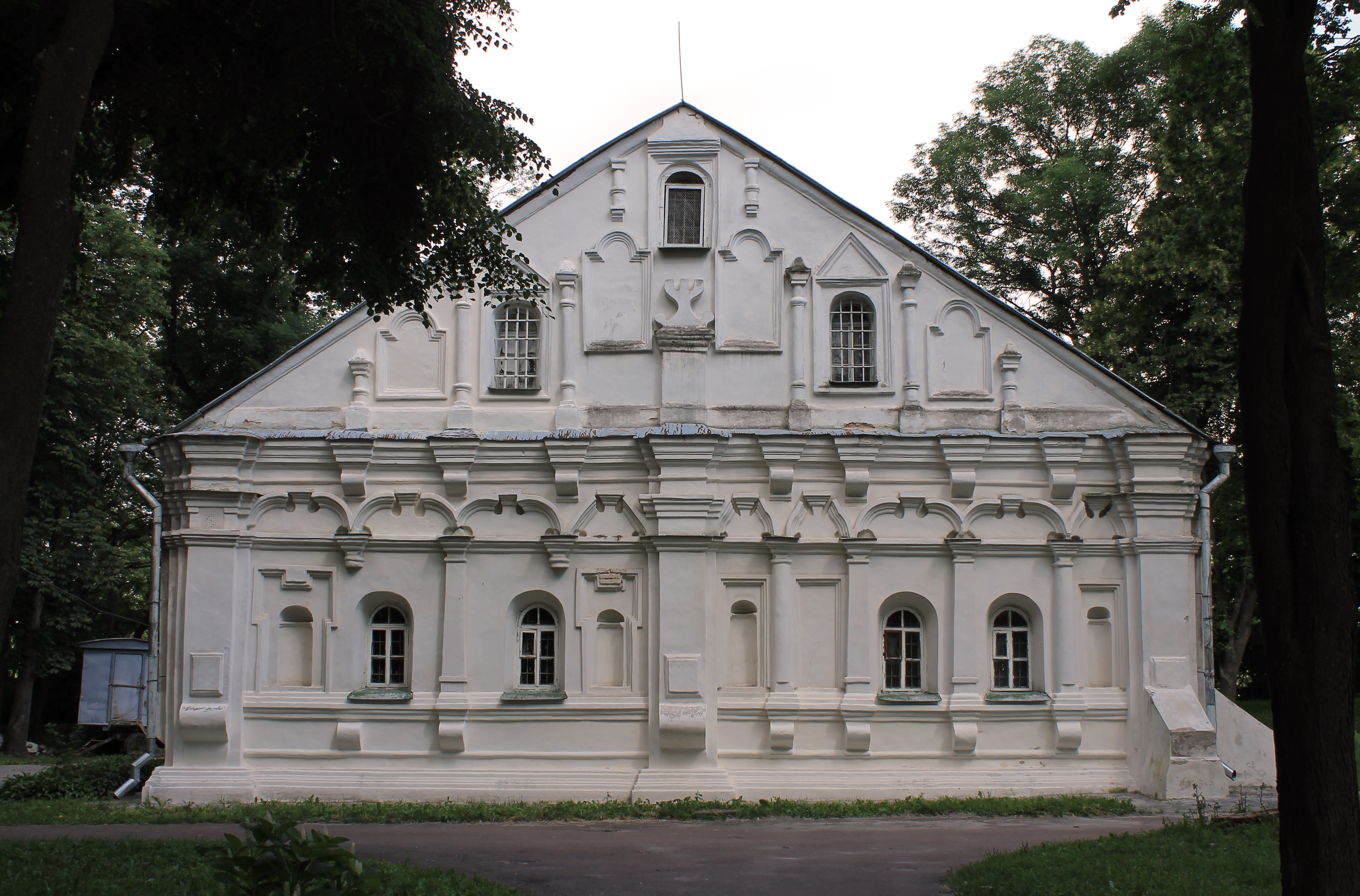
Building of the regimental chancellery in Chernihiv

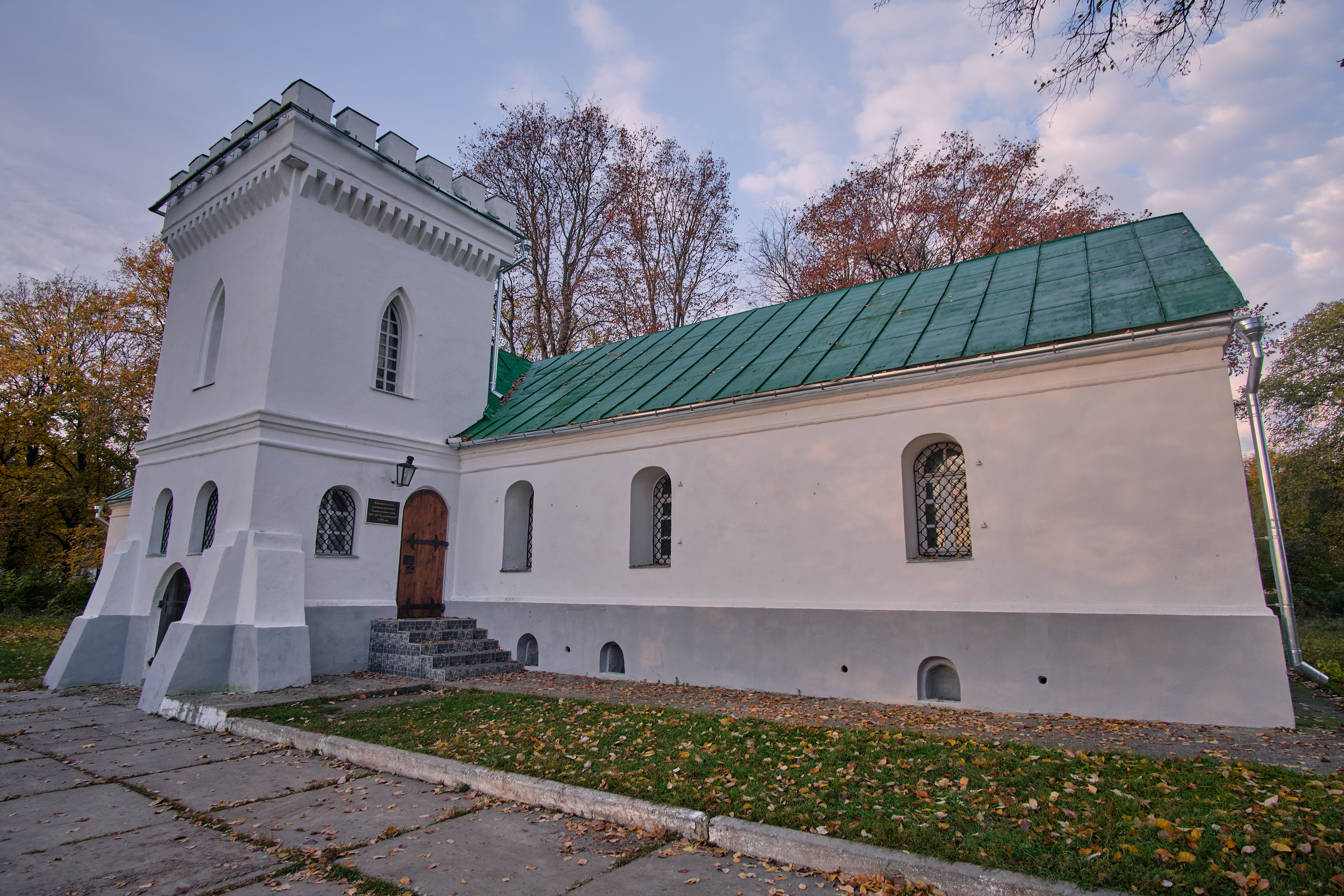
Residence of the regiment's colonel Yakiv Lyzohub in Sedniv

== Notes ==
- Encyclopedia of Ukraine
- Zaruba V.M. Administratyvno-terytorialnyj ustrij ta administraciya Vijska Zaporozkoho u 1648-1782 rr., Dnipropetrovsk, 2007
