= Danylo Apostol =

Hetman of the Zaporizhian Host from 1727 to 1734

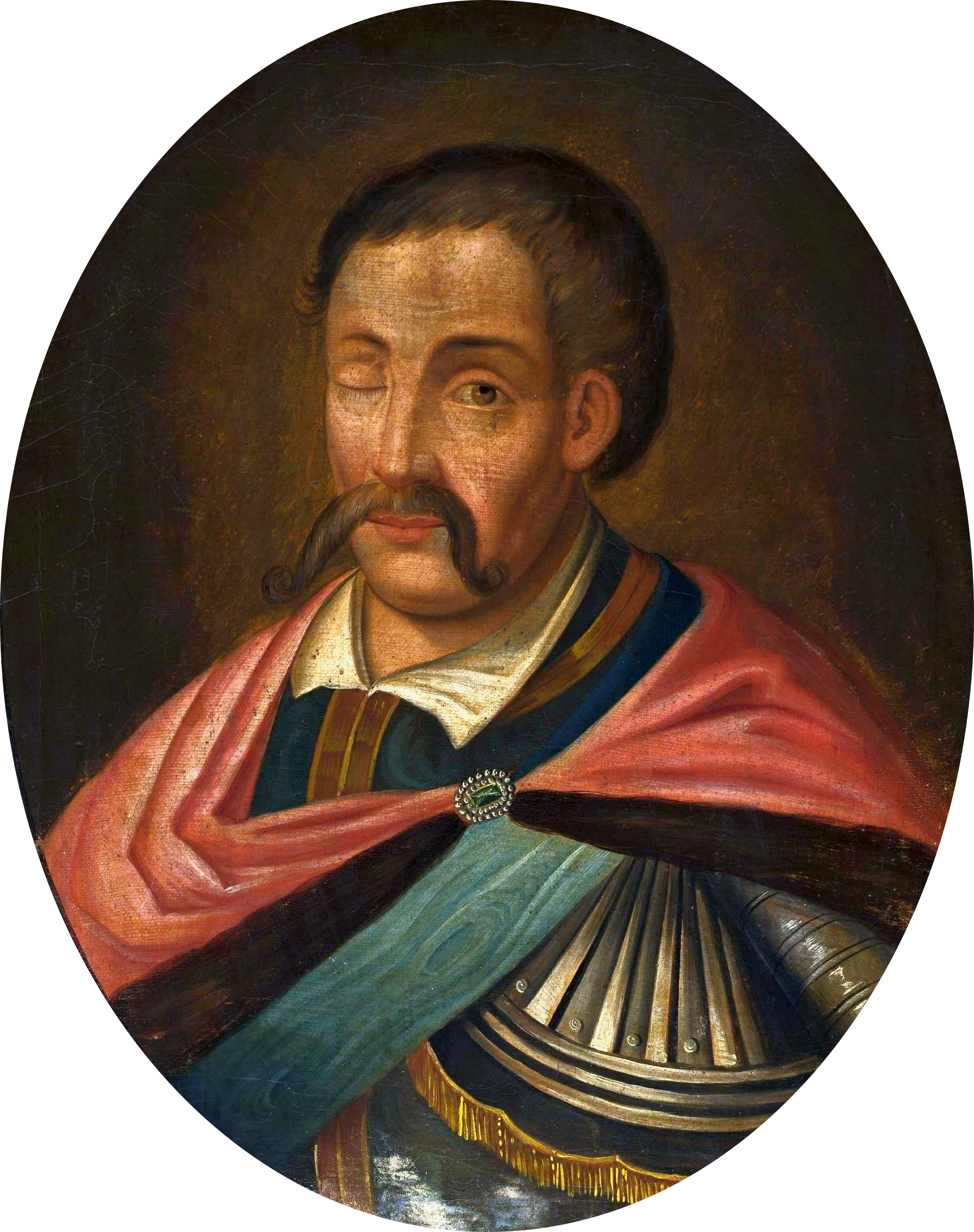
- Portrait, second quarter of the 18th century

Hetman of the Zaporizhian Host
- In office 1727–1734
- Monarchs: Peter II; Anna
- Preceded by: Office restored (Collegium of Little Russia)
- Succeeded by: Office liquidated (Governing Council of the Hetman Office); Kyrylo Rozumovsky (after the restoration of hetman's position in 1750)

Personal details
- Born: December 14, 1654 Sorochyntsi, Cossack Hetmanate (now Ukraine)
- Died: January 28, 1734 (aged 79) Sorochyntsi, Cossack Hetmanate, Russian Empire
- Resting place: Church of Lord's Transfiguration, Velyki Sorochyntsi
- Spouse: Uliana Iskrytska
- Awards: Order of Saint Alexander Nevsky

Military service
- Allegiance: Russia
- Branch/service: Cossack Hetmanate
- Years of service: 1682–1734
- Rank: Colonel
- Battles/wars: Azov campaigns (1695–1696); Great Northern War; Pruth River Campaign

Danylo Pavlovych Apostol (Note: Old Ukrainian: Данило Апостол(ъ); Ukrainian: Данило Павлович Апостол; Russian: Данила Павлович Апостол; Romanian: Dănilă Apostol.) (December 14 [O.S. December 4] 1654 – January 28 [O.S. January 17] 1734) was Hetman of the Zaporizhian Host from 1727 to 1734. During Apostol's rule, Little Russia and the Cossack nobility increased their wealth and estates, at the same time being further incorporated into the Russian Empire.

== Early life and military career ==
Born into a Cossack family of Moldavian origin, Danylo Apostol was a prominent military leader, polkovnyk (colonel) of the Myrhorod Regiment, and a participant in the Russian campaigns against the Ottoman Empire and Crimean Khanate. He fought in the Great Northern War between 1701 and 1705 against the Swedes in Livonia and the Polish–Lithuanian Commonwealth, but in 1708, briefly joined the hetman Ivan Mazepa who sided with Charles XII of Sweden against Peter I of Russia. Later, Danylo Apostol again switched sides and fought on the Russian side, distinguishing himself in the Battle of Poltava.

In 1722, Apostol led Cossack units during the Russo-Persian War that led to the expansion of Russian power in the Caspian region. Danylo Apostol lost his eye during the capture of a Persian fortress in Derbent that led to him receiving the nickname "blind Hetman".

In 1723–1725 Apostol was among the members of Cossack starshyna who were accused of being involved in the alleged mutiny plot of hetman Pavlo Polubotok and suspected of treason. During that period he was imprisoned in the Peter and Paul Fortress.

== Election and service as hetman ==
Following the enthronement of Catherine I, her favourite Alexander Menshikov came to oppose the Collegium of Little Russia due to the latter's plans to introduce direct taxation in the lands of the Hetmanate. As a result, in 1727 the Collegium was abolished, with Apostol being elected hetman of left-bank Ukraine. Before Apostol's election, a secret note was sent to the minister of Collegium of Foreign Affairs, instructing him to prevent the election of any other candidate.

On this occasion, a new code consisting of 28 articles was drawn up in order to regulate relations between Russia and the Hetmanate. According to it, the Hetmanate was prohibited from conducting foreign relations, except of border negotiations with Poland, Crimea and the Ottoman Empire, but only if the latter received approval of the Russian imperial government. The Hetmanate was allowed to maintain ten regiments along with three mercenary units, and in times of war its Cossacks were to serve under a commander appointed by Russian authorities.

The hetman was allowed to present several candidates for the posts of general starshyna and colonels to be appointed by the emperor, and could personally appoint lower-level officials. A general court was established, consisting of three Cossacks and three government appointees, and a commission was organized in order to draw up a new legal code. Duties on foreign goods were reverted to the imperial treasury, and Russians, as well as other non-locals, were permitted to preserve their landholdings in the Hetmanate, but could not bring new peasants to the area.

The aforementioned measures restored some of the autonomy Ukrainian lands had enjoyed until the rule of Peter I. In October 1728 Apostol returned to Hlukhiv from Moscow to great jubilation. The new hetman introduced several measures to improve the Hetmanate's economy, including a revision of land properties and introduced a precise budget to be covered from transport duties. The legal commission created under Apostol continued to work after his death, and in 1744 presented a set of local laws based chiefly on the Statutes of Lithuania for confirmation by the Senate.

== Death and legacy ==
Danylo Apostol died in 1734, after which the hetman's post was replaced with the Governing Council of the Hetman's Office. A new hetman would not be elected until 1750.

Apostol's grandson Joachim A. Gorlenko (1705–1754), the son of his daughter Maria, entered the priesthood of the Russian Orthodox Church and became Joasaph of Belgorod, who was glorified as a saint in 1911.

== Sources ==
- "Апостол, Даниил Павлович" . Brockhaus and Efron Encyclopedic Dictionary (in Russian). 1906.
- Magocsi, Paul Robert (1996). A History of Ukraine. Toronto: University of Toronto Press. ISBN 0-8020-0830-5.
- Yakovenko, Natalia (2006). An Outline History of Medieval and Early Modern Ukraine. Krytyka. ISBN 9667679829.
