= Alexander Buturlin =

Russian general and courtier (1694–1767)

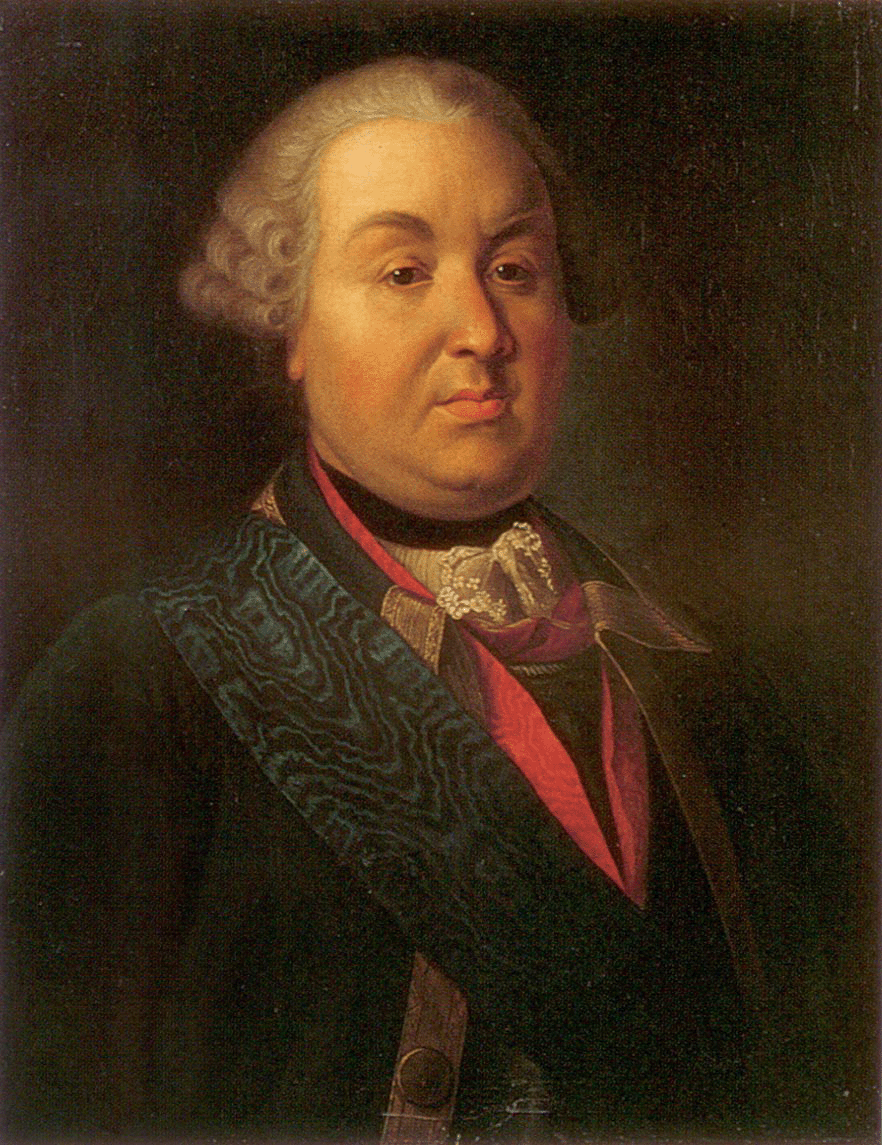
Portrait by an unknown painter

Count Alexander Borisovich Buturlin (Russian: Александр Борисович Бутурлин, romanized: Aleksandr Borisovich Buturlin; 29 July [O.S. 18 July] 1694 – 11 September [O.S. 31 August] 1767) was a Russian general and courtier whose career was much furthered by his good looks and personal affection of Empress Elizabeth.

== Biography ==
Buturlin was born on 29 July [O.S. 18 July] 1694. Alternatively, his birth year is dated 1704. He came from the Buturlin noble family, descended from Ratsha, whose members had been prominent as boyars and voevods since the 12th century. His father, who served as the Captain of the Leib Guard, sent him to the newly established naval academy, where Alexander studied navigation, fencing, and foreign languages for four years. He graduated from the academy in 1720 and was employed by Peter the Great as his orderly and confidant, especially on several secretive missions during the Persian expedition.

In due time he was promoted Chamberlain and attached to the "junior court" of Tsesarevna Elizaveta Petrovna. The young officer impressed the princess so much that she was said to cherish an affection for him until her very end. It was widely rumoured that Elizabeth, then 17, lost her virginity with him. Peter II of Russia, apparently jealous of Buturlin's influence on his beloved aunt, sent him away to Little Russia.

During the following reign Buturlin's career slowly gathered momentum, as he operated against the Turks under Münnich and governed Smolensk in 1735. Upon Elizabeth's accession to the throne in 1741, his fortunes soared and he was sent to defend imperial interests in Lesser Russia. He then governed Livonia for a short time and commanded an army stationed in Moscow. In 1756, he was promoted to the rank of field marshal, and four years later he was granted the hereditary title of count.

The Seven Years' War was then escalating as the Russian forces approached Berlin. At the crucial moment Buturlin, then 66, was unexpectedly appointed the commander-in-chief of the Russian army operating in Prussia. It was said that Russian officers long refused to believe the news of his appointment, knowing Buturlin for a heavy drunkard. "His good looks are his only merit", a contemporary foreign diplomat commented on the issue.

The campaign of 1760 justified uneasy apprehensions, as Buturlin's cautiousness often degenerated into timidity and the atmosphere was spoiled by his jealousy towards a more illustrious colleague, Laudon. The war over, he was recalled by Peter III to Moscow and given the task of preparing his coronation festivities. Buturlin died on 31 August 1767 and was interred in the Alexander Nevsky Monastery.

== Sources ==
- "Бутурлин, Александр Борисович" . Brockhaus and Efron Encyclopedic Dictionary (in Russian). 1906.
