= Collegium of Little Russia (1722–1727) =

Administrative body of the Russian Empire

Collegium of Little Russia (Russian: Малороссийская коллегия) was an administrative body of the Russian Empire in the Hetmanate created for the first time by the ukase of Peter the Great on 27 May 1722, in place of the Little Russia Prikase.

It was created during the life of Hetman Skoropadsky as a higher appellate institution and administrative controlling body of the Russian state system in the Hetmanate. Upon the death of Ivan Skoropadsky on 14 July 1722, the Collegium overtook the Hetman's prerogatives which was confirmed by the Imperial ukases of 27 April and 3 July 1723.

It was composed of the president (brigadier), six members of the presence, prosecutor, and number of chancellors (until 1724 – 31, after - 62). All members of collegium were appointed by the Emperor of Russia or the Governing Senate out of Russian military officers or civil servants.

Unlike the Little Russia Prikase, it was located in Hlukhiv instead of Moscow. In civil affairs, the Collegium was responsible to the Governing Senate, in military - the Commander-in-chief of the Russian Armed Forces in Hetmanate. The work of the Collegium was governed by laws, regulations and business traditions of the Russian Empire.

After becoming the head of state power in Hetmanate, the collegium conducted number of reforms of state structure directed on subordination of all parts of Hetmanate to the Russian administration, implementation of Russian laws and legal norms in the Hetmanate, unification of its orders to the all-Imperial standards. The Collegium of Little Russia for the first time in full volume attracted Cossacks finances to the royal (tsar's) treasury. Moreover, the Collegium reformed tax system, making it possible to increase the size of annual profits (more than twofold in two years) from 45,527 rubles in 1722 to 114,495 rubles in 1724. The majority of collected funds were exported from Ukraine to Moscow and Saint Petersburg. In general, the activity of the Collegium of Little Russia started the actual process of elimination of the autonomy of the Cossack Hetmanate. The attempts of Appointed Hetman Pavlo Polubotok and number of senior officers to counteract the process led to their arrest and imprisonment in the fortress of Peter and Paul (Saint Petersburg).

After the ascension of Peter II on the Russian throne, the political course of the collegium was reviewed and suspended for some time on 12 September 1727. The collegium was not fully liquidated, but rather was incorporated it into the Hetman administration as "plenipotentiary representatives of the Government for the Hetman". The position of Hetman of Zaporizhian Host was revived and the Myrhorod Colonel Danylo Apostol was elected the hetman soon after his release from a custody at the Peter and Paul Fortress in 1725. Since 1733, some "plenipotentiary representatives" were acting as a hetman which led to suspension of the Hetman elections until 1750 and introduction of the Provisional Administration of Hetman Government headed by the Appointed Hetman, General Quartermaster Yakiv Lyzohub. In reality, all administration was in hands of the Commander-in-chief of the Russian Armed Forces in Little Russia, or in Hetmanate.

== See also ==
- Hetman of Zaporizhian Host
- Stepan Velyaminov
