= Sedniv =

Rural locality in Chernihiv Oblast, Ukraine

Sedniv Седнів
- Rural settlement
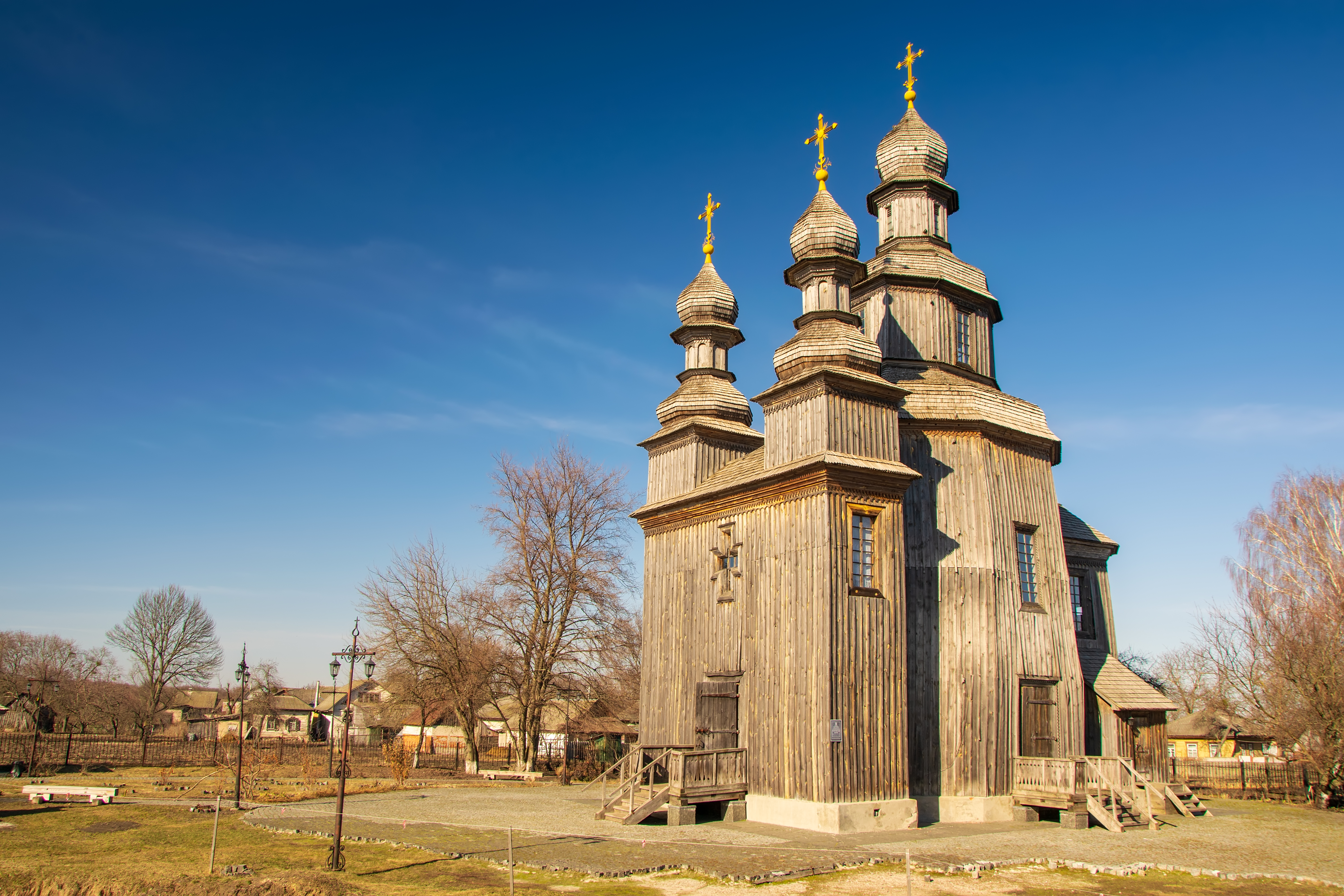
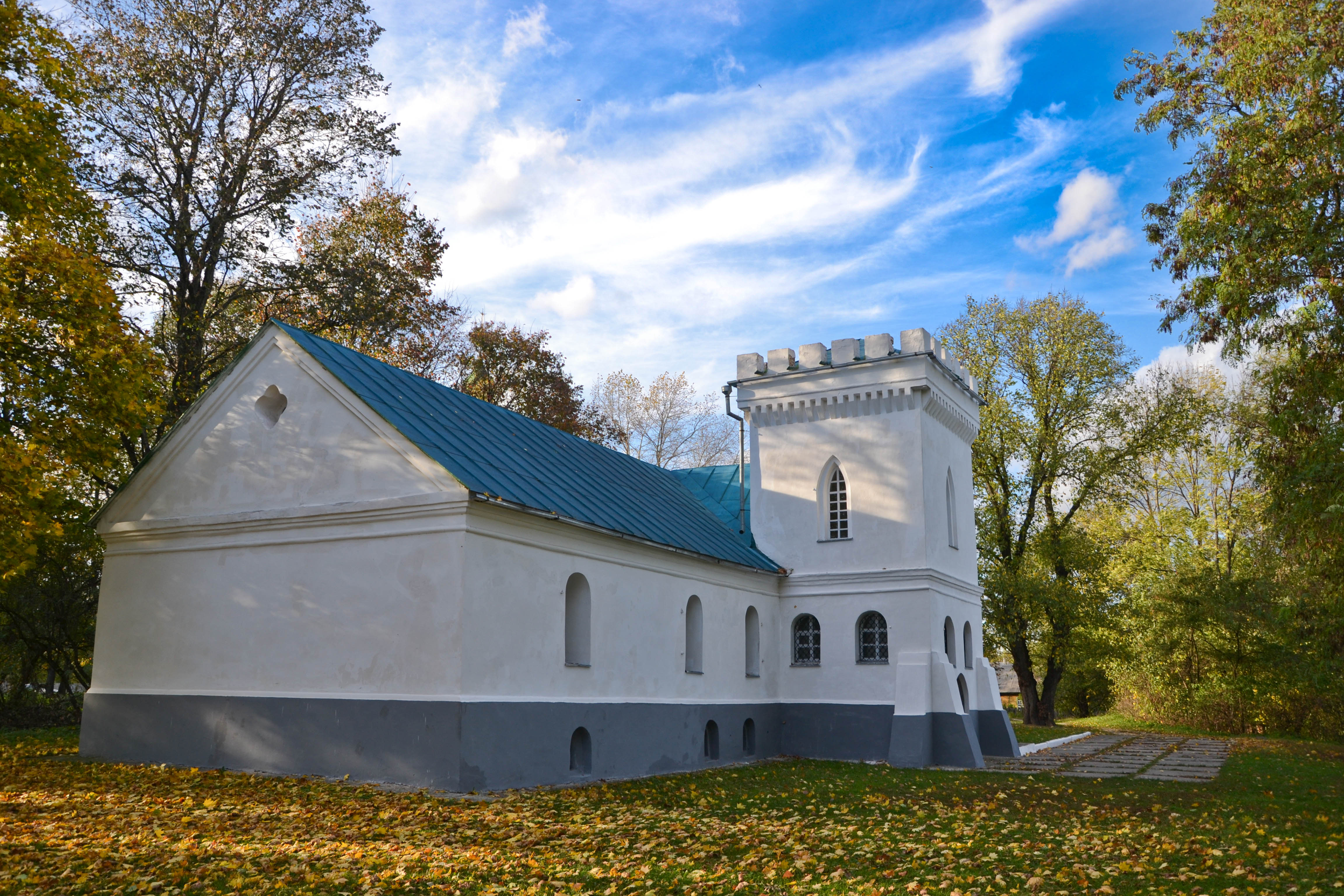
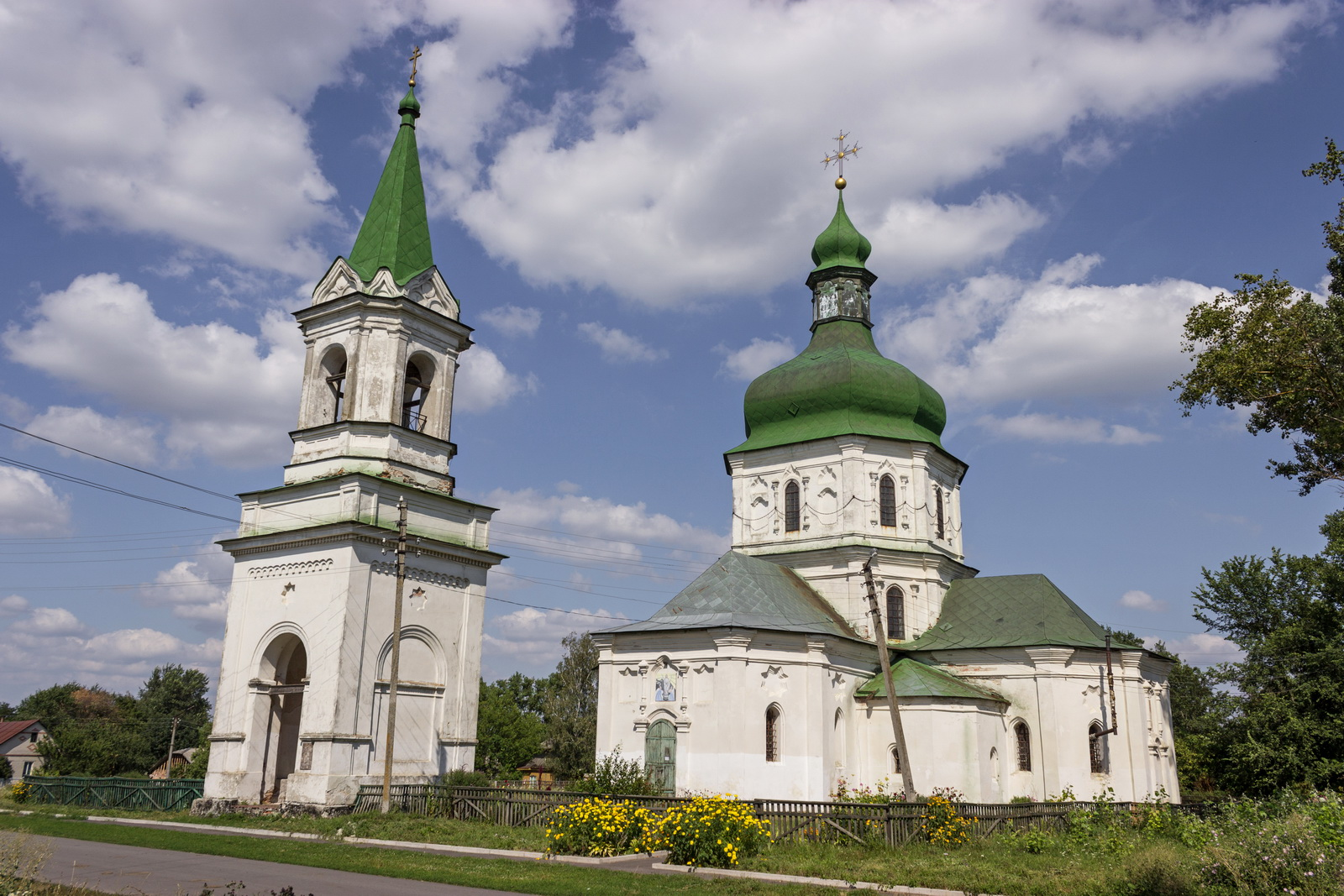
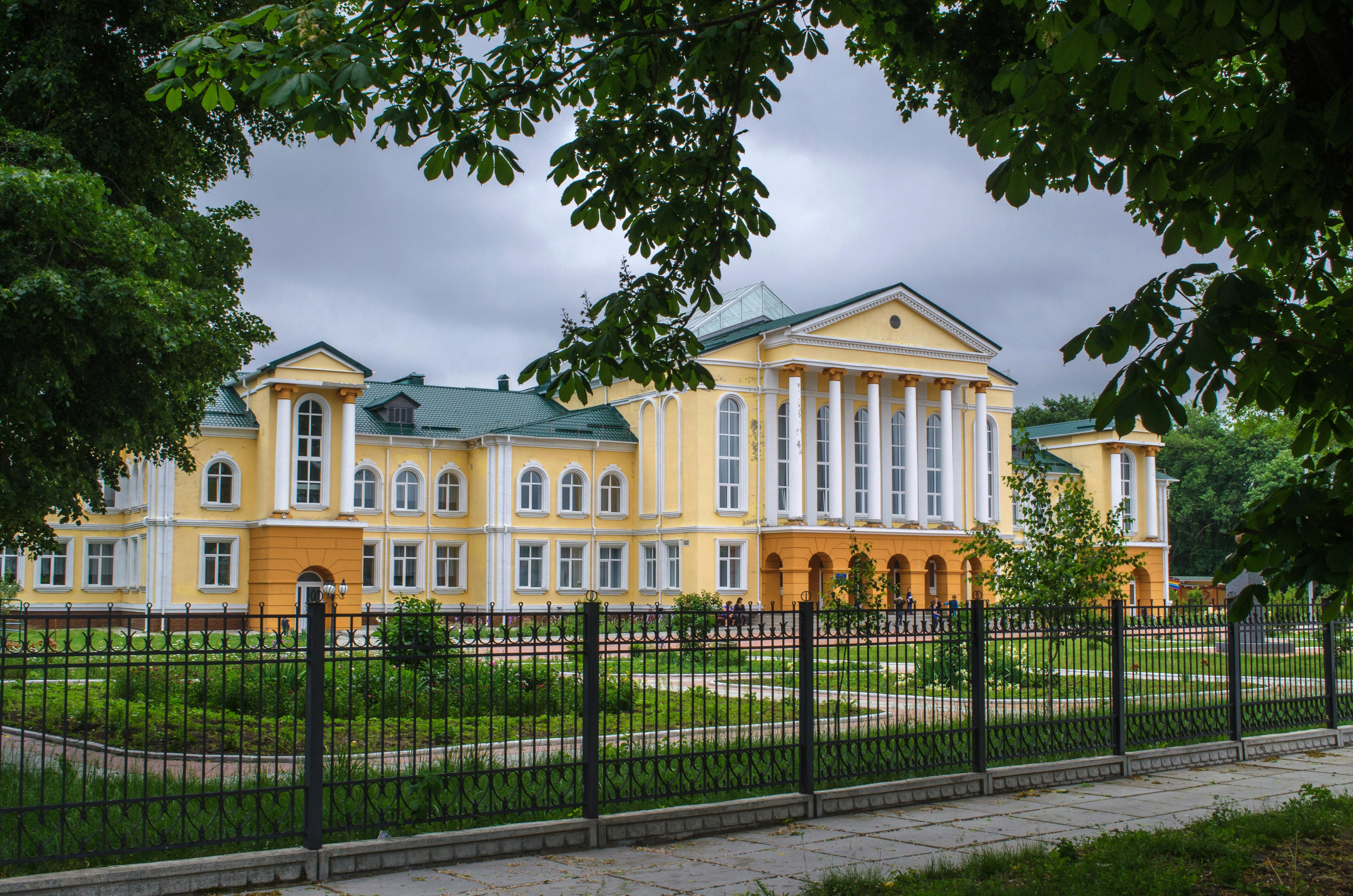
- St. George's Church Lyzohubs' Stone House Resurrection Church New school

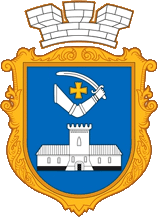
- Coat of arms

- Location within Chernihiv Oblast Location within Ukraine
- Coordinates: 51°38′36″N 31°34′8″E
- Country: Ukraine
- Oblast: Chernihiv Oblast
- Raion: Chernihiv Raion
- Hromada: Sedniv settlement hromada

Population (2022)
  - Total: 1,041
- Postal code: 14000
- Area code: (+380)
- Vehicle registration: CB / 25

Sedniv (Ukrainian: Седнів; Yiddish: סעדניוו) is a rural settlement in Chernihiv Oblast, Ukraine. Located in Chernihiv Raion, Sedniv is the seat of the Sedniv settlement hromada, one of Ukraine's 435 settlement hromadas. It has a population of 1,041 (2022 estimate).

Sedniv is famous for being the hometown of the Lyzohub family of Cossacks. The population of Sedniv suffered heavily from the Holodomor, or Ukrainian Famine, causing it to lose its township status in 1932. More than 25 years later, in 1959, Sedniv was restored to a township.

Sedniv is located at the historic site of the Ruthenian city of Snovsk, then part of Kievan Rus', which was destroyed by the Tatars in 1239. It is unknown when the town changed its name from Snovsk to Sedniv. In 1648–1781 it was a sotnia (district) seat of the Chernihiv Regiment.

== History ==
=== Prehistory ===
Modern researchers trace the history of Sedniv to the Danish settlement of Seden, from which the city got its name. When the territories of the modern-day Chernihiv Oblast were captured by the Rurik dynasty, Sedniv was named Snovesk (Ukrainian: Сновеськ).

=== Kievan Rus' ===
The settlement is first mentioned in chronicles as an ancient fortress city of Snovsk. In 1068. Prince Sviatoslav with three thousand soldiers defeated a 12,000 soldier Cuman army near Snovsk. The name comes from the River Snov. A folk legend tells another version of the town's name: "The devastating hordes of the Crimean Tatars attacked Snovsk, but could not take the city fortress. The Tatars then called the city of Snovsk – "Sidnaame"(сидняме). This is a translation from the Tatar language to mean evil and brave. Hence – Sedniv."

From the 10th to 11th centuries, Snovsk was one of the strongholds of Kievan Rus', the center of a separate administrative unit – the Snovsk Tysiacha (thousand).

From the 12th to 13th centuries, Snovsk was a part of the Chernihiv Principality that was later destroyed by Tatars invaders in 1239.

In the mid-14th century, the city was incorporated into the Grand Duchy of Lithuania.

=== Cossack Hetmanate ===
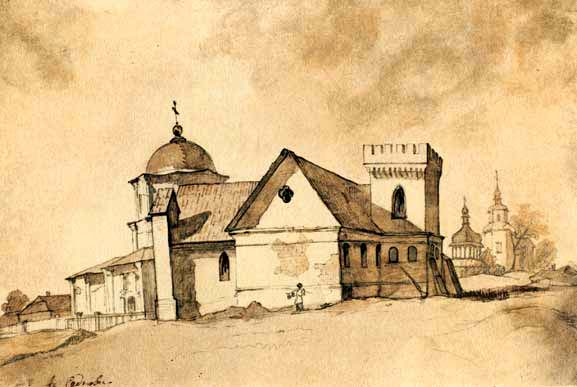
Lyzohub Stonehouse (Кам'яниця Лизогубів), Taras Shevchenko, 1846.

Between 1648 and 1781, Sedniv was a sotnia town of the Chernihiv Regiment, and later a parish town of Little Russia Governorate before being incorporated into Chernihiv Governorate in 1802. The town also housed the Sedniv Regiment for a short time in 1659.

At the end of the 17th century, Sedniv became a chattel of the Cossack Lyzohub family.

=== Russian Empire ===
In the middle of the 19th century, the town was divided into two parts: Mlyny (lit. 'Mills') and Kozhumiaky (lit. 'Tanners'). A thriving regional center of tannery, by 1859 Sedniv had 10 tanneries, lard and candle manufactories, as well as 11 mills.

=== Ukrainian People's Republic ===
In 1917, Sedniv became part of newly created Ukrainian People's Republic. During the Ukrainian–Soviet War the town was captured by Russian troops on 20 January 1918, and was retaken by joint German and Ukrainian armies on 18 March 1918.

The Soviet-aligned Bohun Cossack Regiment attacked the town on 10 January 1919, annexing it into Ukrainian People's Republic of Soviets. 25 UPR soldiers died in the battle; their remains were buried at the local cemetery.

=== Soviet era ===
A Soviet administration was established in August 1920 with the formation of Sedniv Village Council. During the post-war administrative reform, the town became part of Chernihiv Oblast's Horodnia Raion.

Sedniv was heavily hit by the Holodomor. As the town's inhabitants heavily resisted Soviet collectivization policies, the town was included into the Soviet black boards. At least 145 people perished during this period, and the town itself was downgraded into a village.

=== Independence ===
The settlement is on the list of historic settlements of Ukraine approved by the Cabinet of Ministers of Ukraine in 2001.

=== Russian invasion of Ukraine ===
Russian forces entered Sedniv in the early morning hours of 24 February 2022. The town was initially used as staging area for further Russian advances in Chernihiv Oblast. According to locals, Russian forces came in three waves.

Local inhabitants reported excessive looting and intimidation by Russian forces. According to local culturologists, a number of places of historical and architectural significance were either damaged or outright destroyed. Days before the Russian army pulled back from north Ukraine, local media reported that on-the-ground military units were burning corpses of their fallen in a local starch factory furnaces.

Until 26 January 2024, Sedniv was designated as an urban-type settlement. On this very day, a new law entered into force which abolished this status, and Sedniv became a rural settlement.

== Geography ==
The village is located on the River Snov, and sits about 25 km from the railway station in Chernihiv.

== Demographics ==
=== Population data ===
1959	1979	1989	2001	2016
2395	1930	1836	1351	1103

=== Population distribution by native language (2001) ===
Ukrainian	Russian
95,86%	3,92%

== Culture ==
=== Historical sites ===
- Remains of Snovsk's medieval ramparts
- St. George's Church, a wooden church built on or before 1747
- Lyzohubs' Manor, a manor formerly belonging to Coloner Yakiv Lyzohub of the Chernihiv Regiment. The complex includes the 17th-century Lyzohubs' Stone House (Kamianytsia), the main building and Hlibov's Gazebo (both built in the 19th century), as well as a large park.
- Church of the Resurrection of the Christ, Lyzohubs' family crypt, constructed in 1690
- Chernihiv Energy Museum

== Education ==
During the Soviet era, the Lyzohub Manor was converted into an elementary school by the regional government. A new educational complex, consisting of a kindergarten and a secondary school, was constructed in 2012.

== Gallery ==
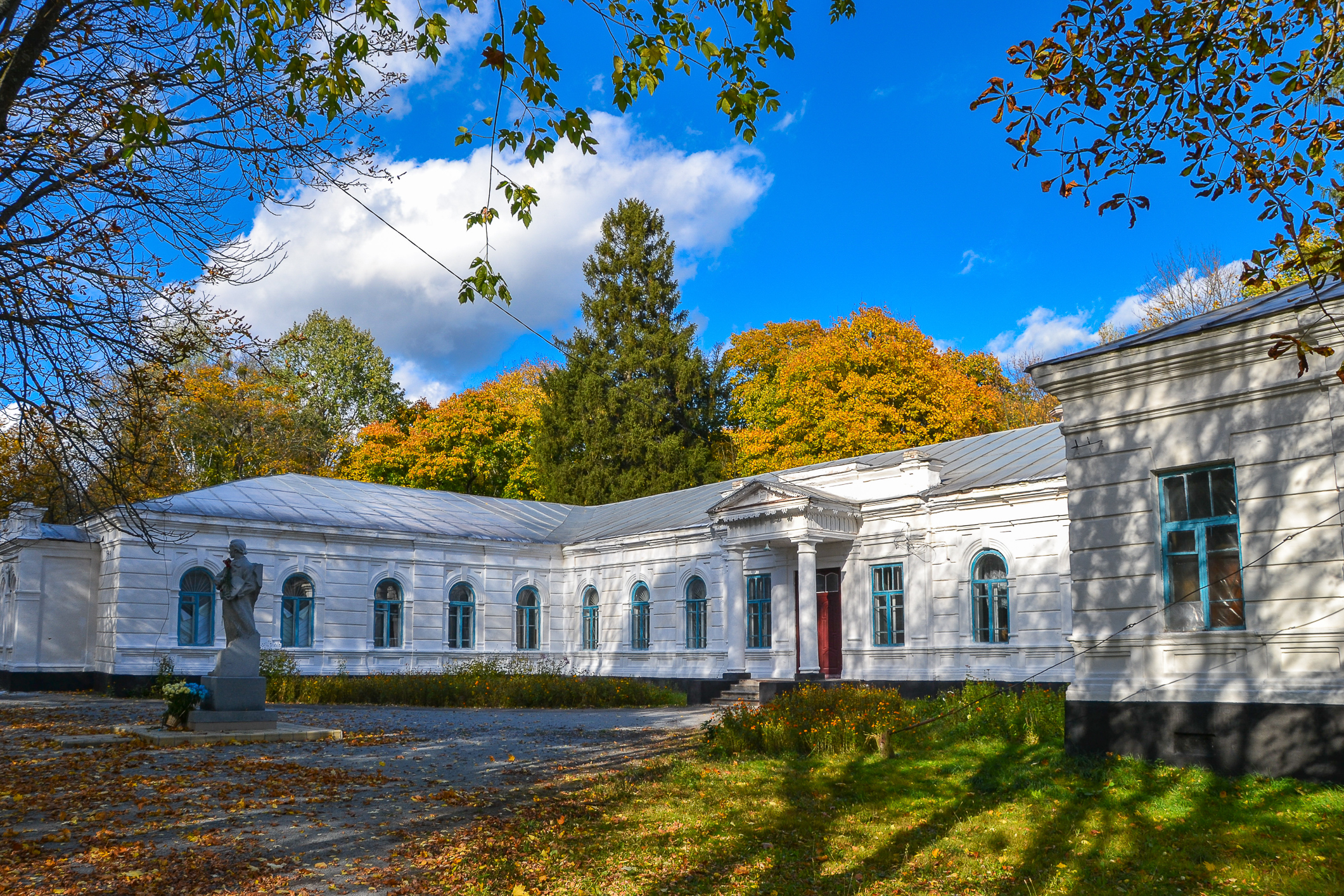
Building of the Lyzohub Family Manor (19th century)

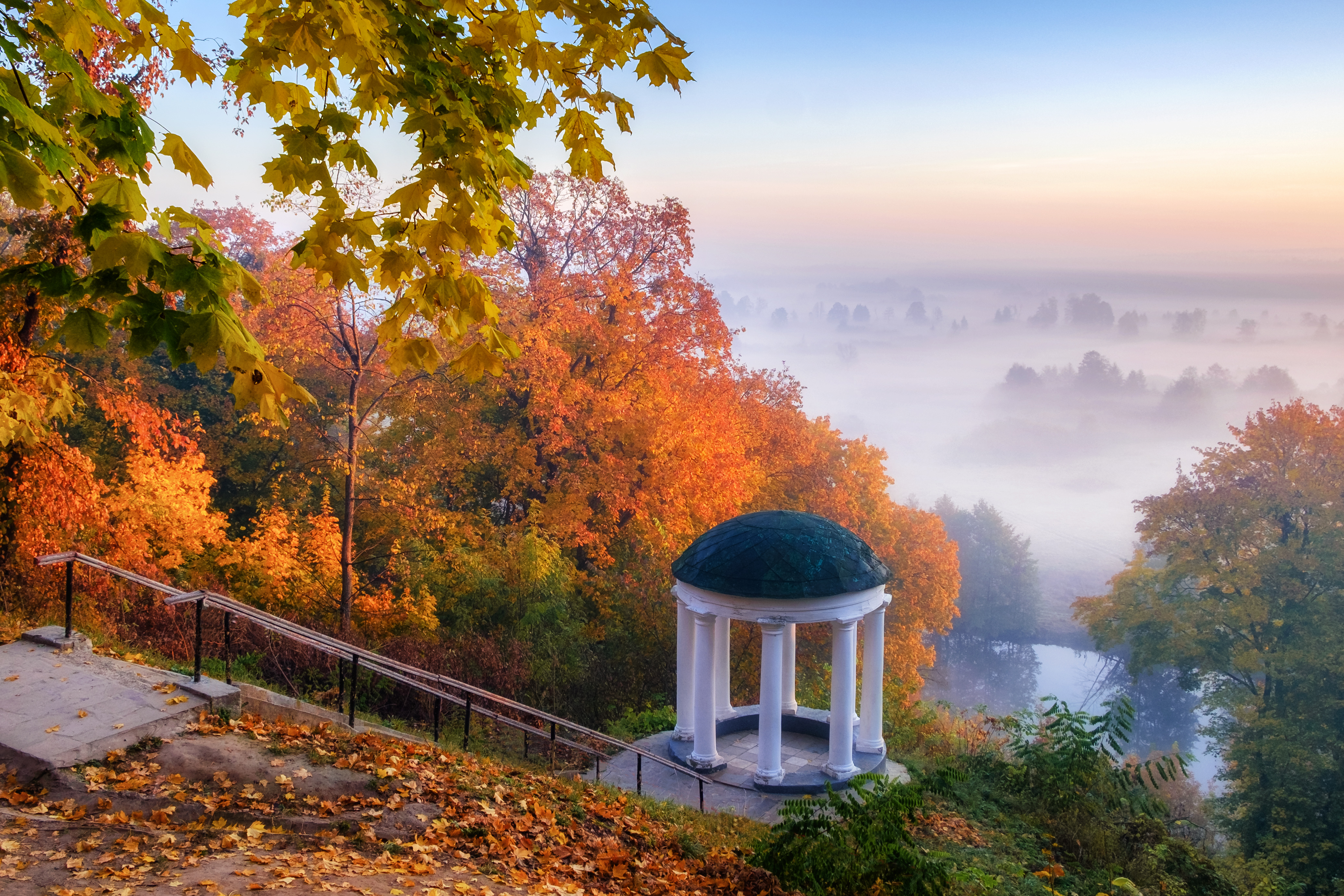
Hlibov's Gazebo

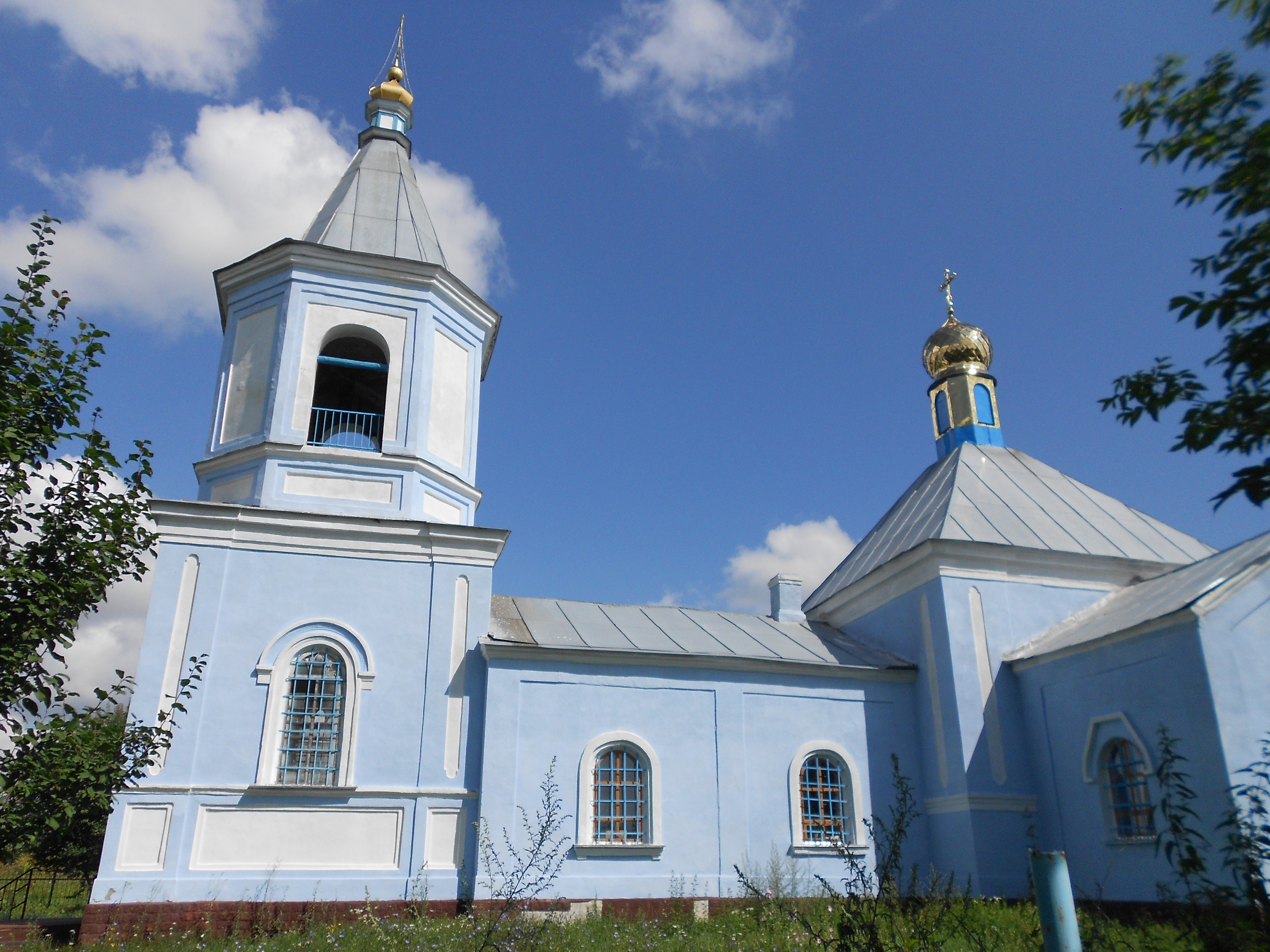
Trinity Church

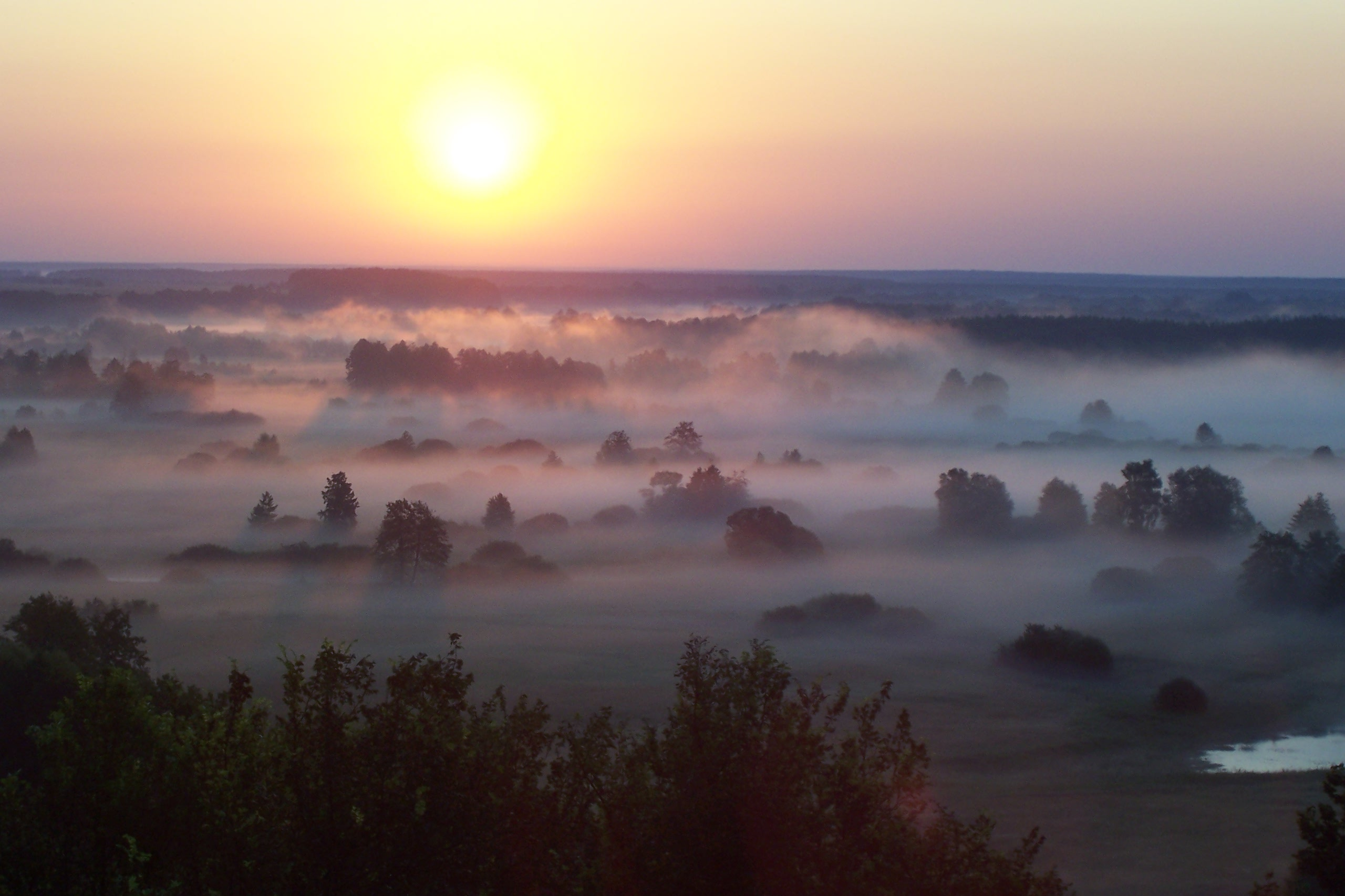
Sunrise in Sedniv

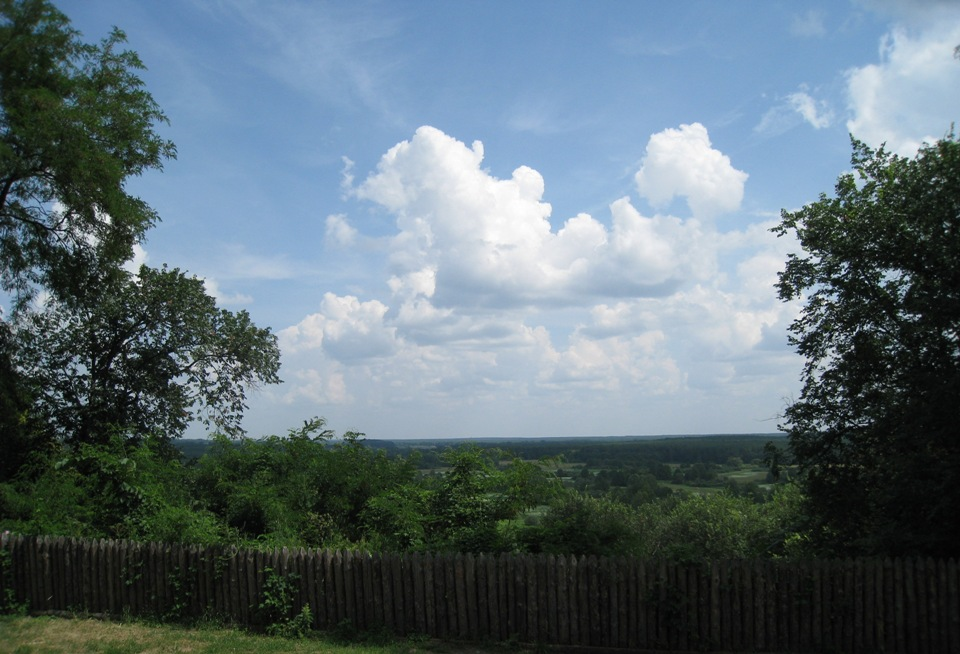
View of Snov River from the Sedniv observation deck

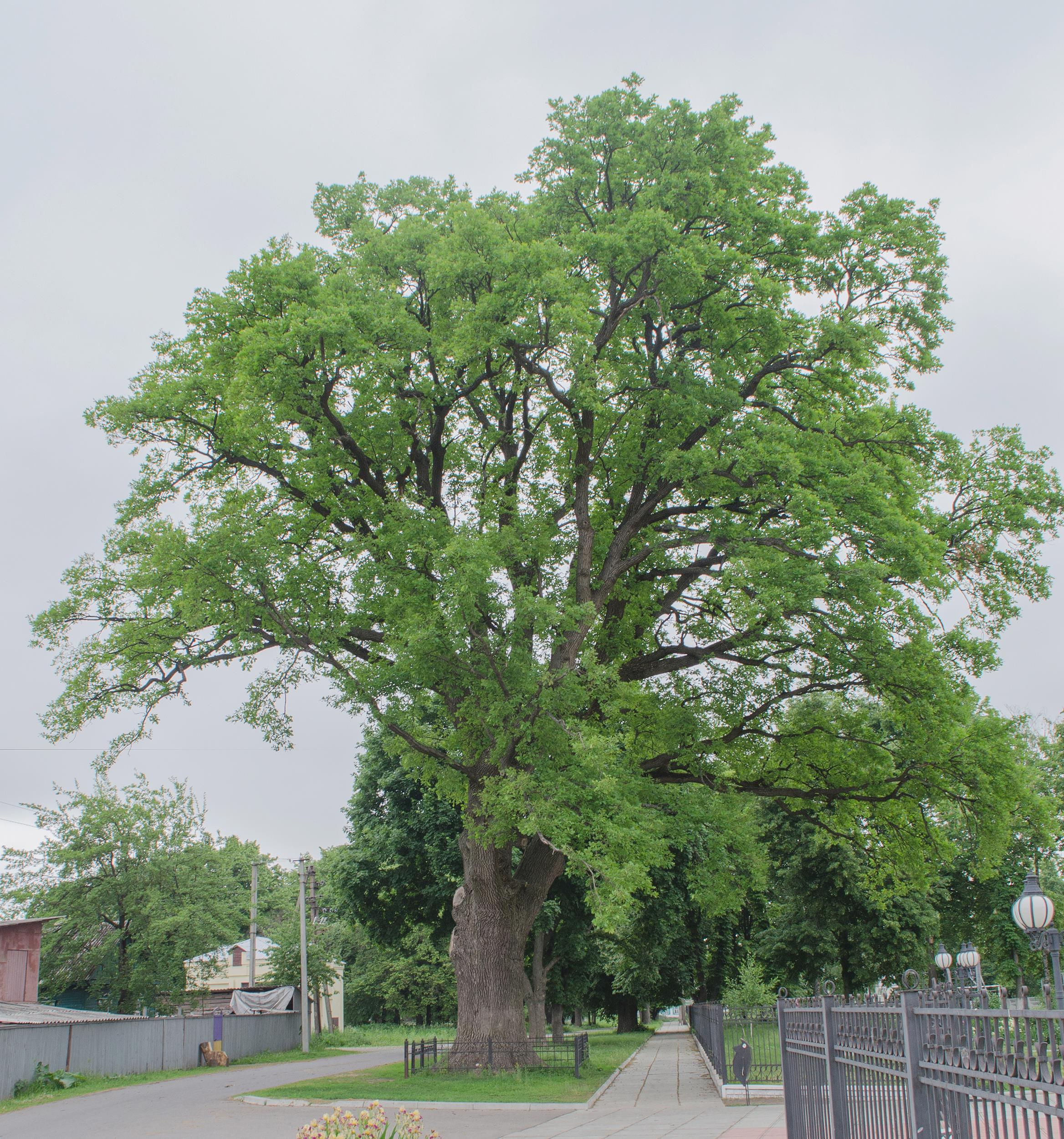
Bohdan Oak
