= Patent of nobility =

Document confirming nobility

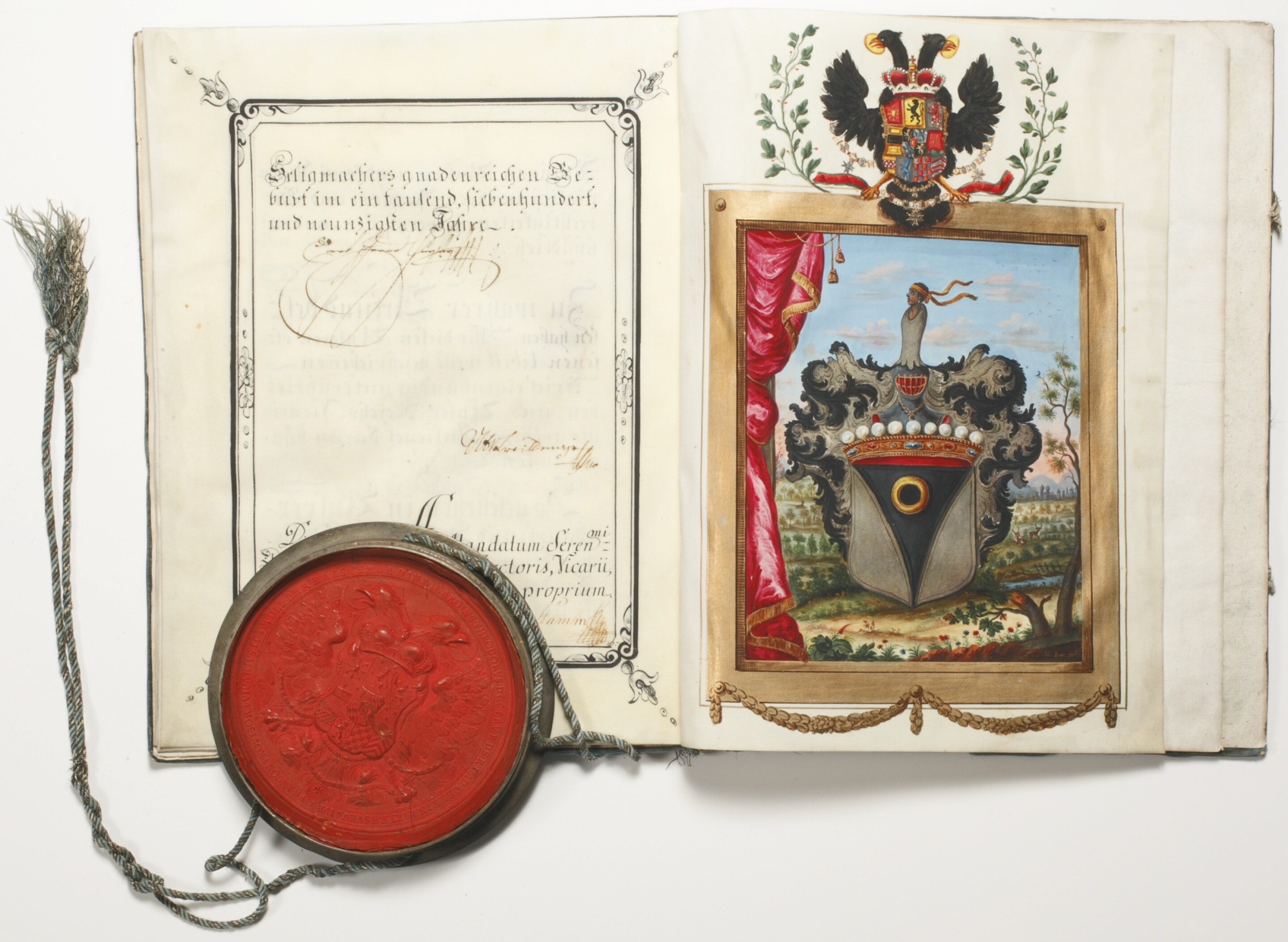
Patent of nobility, an illuminated manuscript with the assigned coat of arms and the imperial seal (Wappen der Grafen von Waldkirch, 1792)

The patent of nobility, also letters of nobility (always pl.), or diploma of nobility documented the legal act of ennoblement (granting rights of a nobleman to a "new man" and his family). The ennoblement was an event of ultimate importance in a feudal society.

The preparation of diploma of nobility was usually done at the expense of a future noble, so his wealth and sense of aesthetics influenced the grandeur and appearance of the document. The patent was kept in the family archives, and practicality dictated registering it in the central archive, with the seal applied.

The patents were created as an instrument of a central power to be used against the landed hereditary aristocracy. The first European patent was issued by Philip III of France in the early 1270s to a commoner silversmith. While the rules for granting the patents were established by the son of Philip III, Philip IV of France, these were "far from irreversible", and the clear picture of French nobility as the men either able to claim the knightly descent or holding the patent only emerged by the second half of the 14th century.

The oldest diploma of nobility in Germany was granted in 1360 by Charles IV, Holy Roman Emperor, to his court chaplain, Wicker Frosch.

"Old" nobility tried to distance themselves from the holders of newly acquired patents. In Germany and Austria, for example, "the patent was a ticket of entry, not a membership card": multiple decades should have passed after ennoblement before the "ancient nobility" with roots predating the patent system (so called uradel), would consider socially accepting and intermarrying the newcomers, the briefadel. At an extreme, in the 19th century Austrian "old" aristocracy did not mingle with briefadel at all, this was helped by the former group's general disinterest in the day-to-day running of the country.

Practice of granting the patents of nobility continues in the 21st century. For example, the King of Belgium awards the nobility titles on a regular basis.

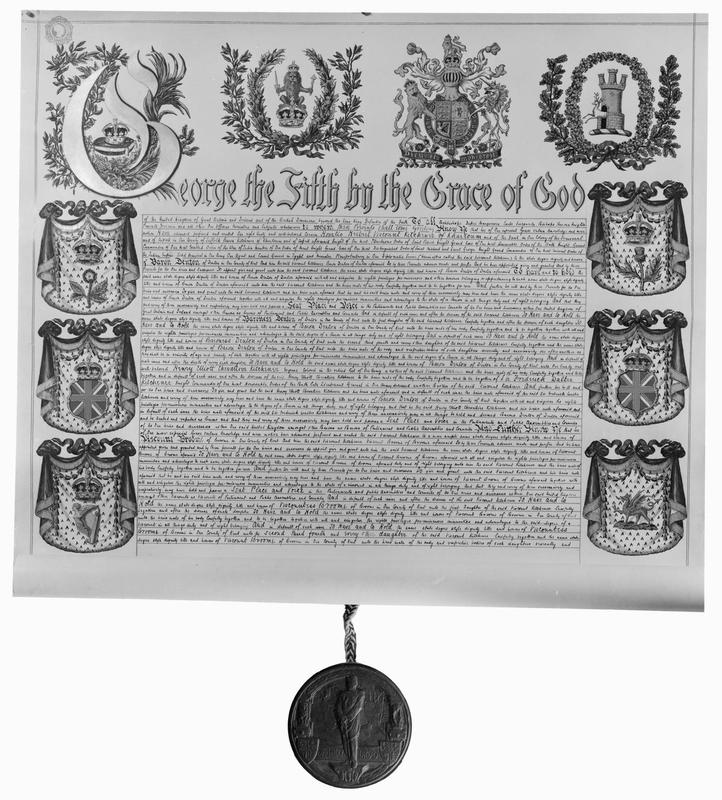
1914 letters patent in the name of George V creating for Horatio Kitchener the titles Earl Kitchener, Viscount Broome, and Baron Denham

A Peerage of the United Kingdom is created by letters patent sealed in green wax with the Great Seal of the Realm.

== Sources ==
- Kiliańczyk-Zięba, Justyna (2019). "On the Diploma of Nobility of Jan Januszowski and a Portrait of a Renaissance Printer". Terminus. 21 (Special Issue 1): 81–105. doi:10.4467/20843844TE.19.027.11288.
- Sagarra, E. (2017). A Social History of Germany, 1648-1914. Taylor & Francis. ISBN 978-1-351-53452-9.
- The Book of Dates; Or, Treasury of Universal Reference: ... New and Revised Edition. C. Griffin & Company. 1866.
- Montgomery, D.H. (1903). The Leading Facts of French History. The leading facts of history series. Ginn.
- Gritzner, Erich (1912). "Heraldik". In Meister, A. (ed.). Grundriss der geschichtswissenschaft: zur einführung in das studium der deutschen geschichte des mittelalters und der neuzeit, herausgegeben (in German). B. G. Teubner.
- McKitterick, R.; Abulafia, D. (1995). The New Cambridge Medieval History: Volume 5, C.1198-c.1300. Cambridge histories online. Cambridge University Press. ISBN 978-0-521-36289-4.
