= Campaign against the Russian garrisons =

1668 Cossack campaign against the Russian Tsardom

Campaign against the garrisons
- Part of the Left-Bank Uprising
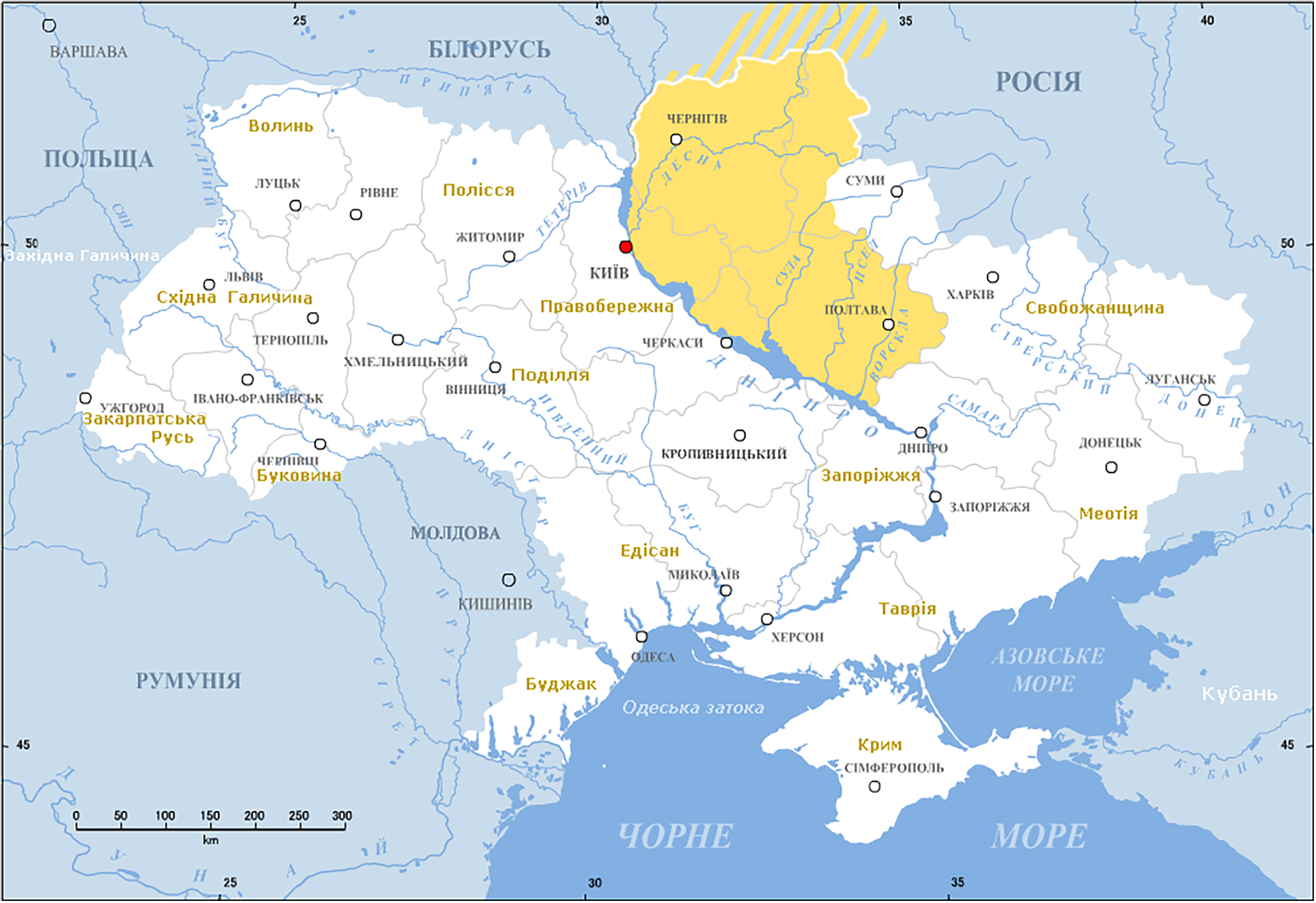
- Left-bank Ukraine, where the campaign took place
Date	January–March 1668
Location	Left-bank Ukraine
Result	Cossack victory
Territorial changes	Russian-held cities, excluding Chernihiv, Nizhyn, Pereyaslavl and Oster are captured by the Cossacks

Belligerents
Cossack Hetmanate	Tsardom of Russia

Commanders and leaders
Ivan Briukhovetsky; Ivan Samoylovych; Oleksandr Urbanovych; Petro Roslavlets; Artem Martynovych (WIA) (Note: Was wounded during one of the assaults on Nizhyn); Oleksiy Malynovsky	Andrey Tolstoy; Ivan Rzhevsky; Ignatiy Volkonskiy †; Isai Kvashnin †; Miron Kologrivov (POW); Voivode Ogaryov (WIA)

Strength
Unknown	8,066 to 12,000

The Campaign against the Russian garrisons (Note: Russian: Кампания против российских гарнизонов Ukrainian: Кампанія проти російських гарнізонів) was the first major phase of the Left-bank uprising, aimed at destroying the Russian garrisons in the cities of Left-bank Ukraine. The Cossacks launched a series of coordinated sieges that led mostly to a fall of most of the Russian-held cities, excluding several cities that continued to fight until August–September of 1668.

== Background ==
Briukhovetsky, who had become a hetman in 1663 after the 1663 Black Council, was of a Pro-Moscow orientation for a long time. In 1665, after the signing of Moscow articles, the Russian garrisons were placed in several Ukrainian cities, leading to an intensification of the tensions between the local population and the Russian voivodes. After the Truce of Andrusovo, which partitioned the Cossack Hetmanate along the Dnieper, his reputation went down even more. On 9 of January 1668, on a rada in Hadiach, he declared about the breakup with Russia and alliance with the Ottoman Empire and the Right-bank hetman Petro Doroshenko, leading to the uprising against Russia.

== Campaign ==
The campaign began at the end on the same month. On 25 of January, the Cossacks of Ivan Samoylovych besieged Chernihiv and captured the old and new towns of the city, however their attempts to capture the Upper small town ended in a failure. On 30 of January, the Cossacks besieged the Russian garrison of Isai Kvashnin in Novhorod-Siverskyi. Despite the stubborn resistance and the attempts of negotiations, the garrison was eventually defeated and Kvashnin was killed. In Hlukhiv, the Russian garrison was besieged and eventually defeated. Its commander, Miron Kologrivov, was captured. On 8 of February, the Cossacks defeated the Russian garrison in Hadiach, where a Russian voivode Ogaryov made an agreement with Briukhovetsky and tried to leave the city but got attacked by the Cossacks and lost 120 people. In Poltava, the local garrison achieved an agreement with the Cossacks and withdrew without open battles. In Starodub, the Cossacks led by Petro Roslavlets assaulted the fortress and captured it on 15 (Note: 25 of February by new style) of February. The entire garrison of Starodub fortress was either killed or captured, including its commander, Ignatiy Volkonskiy. The Cossacks captured 26 cannons in the city. In Nizhyn, the Cossacks led by Artem Martynovych besieged the Nizhyn castle, where a Russian garrison of Ivan Rzhevsky was dislocated, and began firing it from cannons. All of the Cossack attempts to capture the castle were repelled. Per the report from Lazar Branovich on 8 of March, the Cossacks lost about 2,500 people in total during the siege of Nizhyn. In February, the Russian garrison started the negotiations with the Cossacks in order to achieve a temporary ceasefire. These talks were not successful. As of 10 March, the Cossacks established control over the entire territory of Siversk regiment. In the same month, the Cossacks of Roslavets raided Bryansk and inflicted casualties on the garrison.

== Aftermath ==
As a result of the campaign, by mid-March most of the Russian garrisons were either destroyed or expelled from Ukraine. The only Russian-held cities that managed to outstand the campaign were Nizhyn, Chernihiv, Pereyaslav and Oster. Control over these cities allowed the Russians to maintain their presence on the Left-bank. At the end of March, Romodanovsky invaded Ukraine with the goal of unblocking the Russian garrisons, reaching Kyiv and fully suppressing the Cossack revolt. His units besieged the cities of Kotelva, Pochep, Hlukhiv and Opishnya, leading to a failure of Romodanovsky's expedition. The sieges of these towns were lifted in June 1668 by the invading forces of Petro Doroshenko, who had clashed with Romodanovsky at Khukhra and forced him to retreat, but did not bring a decisive victory. After the battle of Sevsk, in which the Tatar-Cossack detachment was defeated, Doroshenko was forced to leave the Left-bank, which allowed Romodanovsky to invade Ukraine once again. The siege of Nizhyn was lifted in August of 1668, its population and the population of Voronizh was massacred. The siege of Russian garrison in Chernihiv was lifted on 20 of September as a result of Romodanovsky's assault on the old and new towns.

== See also ==
- Left-bank Uprising
- Siege of Chernihiv (1668)
- Battle of Sednev
- Battle of Gaivoron

== Bibliography ==
- Velikanov, Vladimir S.; Lazarev, Yakov A. (2020). Царские воеводы и гарнизоны на Украине 1654-1669 [Tsarist voevodes and garrisons in Ukraine 1654-1669] (in Russian). Russian Academy of Sciences: Ratnoe delo. Moscow: Русские витязи. ISBN 978-5-907245-00-6.
- Zhelezko, R.A. (2013). "Українсько-московська війна 1668 р. в Ніжині". Сіверщина в історії України: Зб. наук. пр. — Вип. 6. Hlukhiv: 180–183.
- Omelchenko, Vasyl (1985). Гетьман Петро Дорошенко: огляд його життя і політичної діяльности (in Ukrainian). Vyd. Ukr. vilʹnoï akademiï nauk u SShA. ISBN 978-0-916381-03-5.
- Kovalenko, Serhiy (2007). Україна під булавою Богдана Хмельницького: енциклопедія у 3-х томах (in Ukrainian). Вид-во "Стікс-Ко". ISBN 978-966-96849-0-5.
- Dikiy, Andrey (2022). Войны России за Украину. От царя Алексея до Екатерины Великой (in Russian). Родина. ISBN 978-5-04-376793-6.
