= Battle of Gaivoron =

Ambush on the Russian army during the Left-bank uprising

- Part of the Left-Bank Uprising
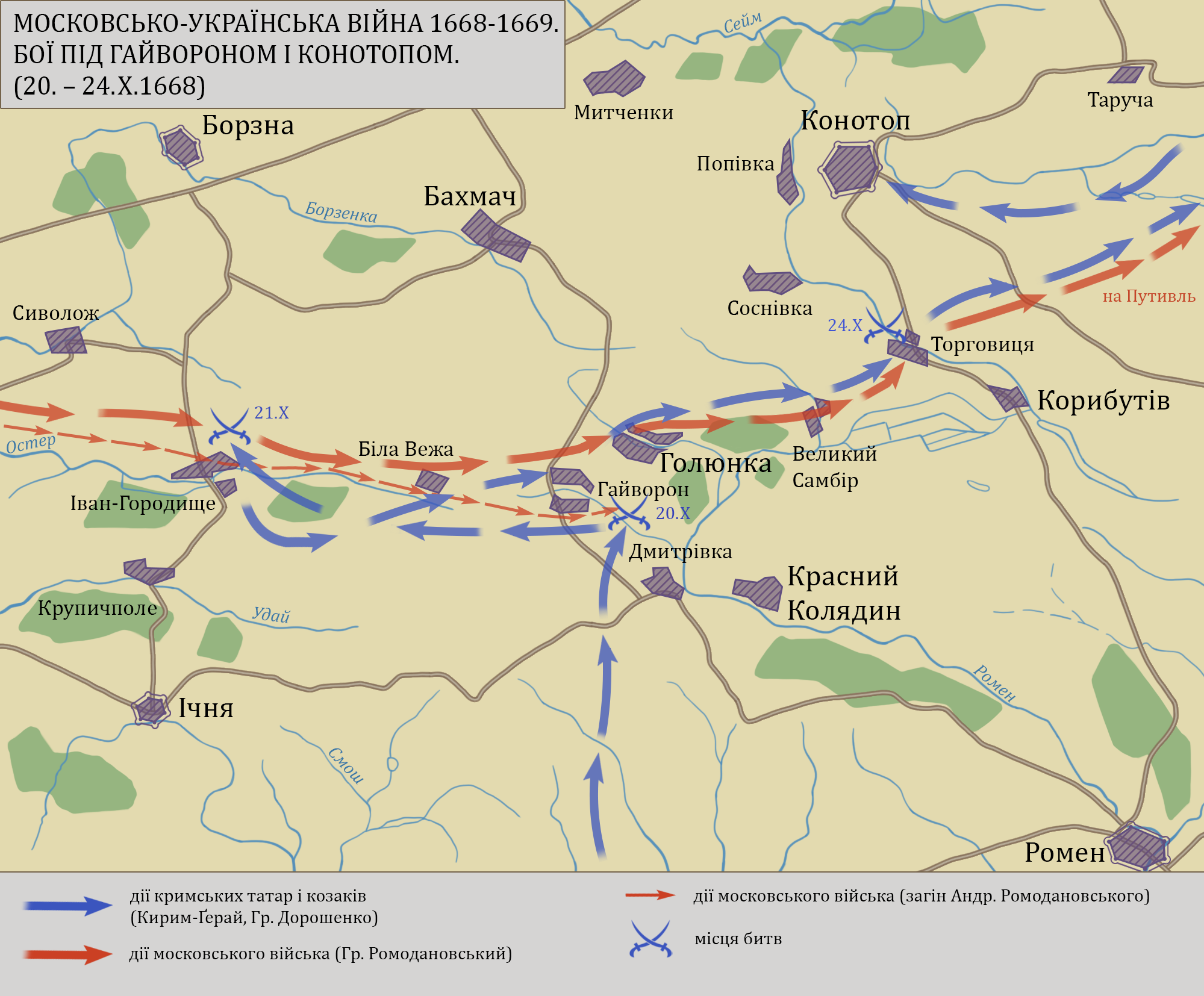
- Map of the battles at Gaivoron and Konotop in October of 1668
Date	10 October 1668
Location	Near Hayvoron (now Chernihiv oblast, Ukraine)
Result	Cossack–Tatar victory

Belligerents
Tsardom of Russia	Cossack Hetmanate; Crimean Khanate

Commanders and leaders
Andrey Romodanovsky (POW); Aleksandr Skuratov (POW); Mikhail Tolstoy (POW); Mikhail Golovnin (POW)	Grigoriy Doroshenko; Petro Sukhoviy; Qirim-Giray

Strength
600 soldiers	7,000 Cossacks; 15,000 Tatars

Casualties and losses
Heavy	Unknown

The Battle of Gaivoron (Ukrainian: Битва під Гайвороном) was a battle that took place on 10 of October 1668 during the Left-Bank uprising between the Crimean cavalry and the Zaporozhian Cossacks led by Grigoriy Doroshenko and kalga Qirim-Giray from one side and the Russian forces led by Andrey Romodanovsky on the other. The Tatar–Cossack corps that was sent by Petro Doroshenko to the Left-Bank caught up the Russian forces near the village of Gaivoron (now Chernihiv oblast, Ukraine) and defeated them.

== Background ==
In June 1668 during the Left-Bank uprising, hetman of the Right-bank Ukraine Petro Doroshenko invaded the Left-bank and was proclaimed as a hetman of the both sides of Dnieper. He clashed with the Russian troops at Khukhra and forced them to retreat, but did not inflict a decisive defeat on them. The Tatars, who were allied with Doroshenko, invaded Russia together with some Cossacks but were defeated by the Russian army in the Battle of Sevsk. This clash, as well as the Polish-Lithuanian invasion of Podolia, forced Doroshenko to leave the Left-Bank and place Demian Mnohohrishny as an acting hetman. Learning about Doroshenko's withdrawal, Russian army led by prince Grigory Romodanovsky and his son Andrei invaded Ukraine. On September 14, Romodanovsky's army captured and sacked Nizhyn and on 17 of September it has advanced towards Chernigov, which was besieged by Ivan Samoylovych. Russian forces lifted the siege and captured Old and New towns of the city. Learning about the invasion, Mnohohrishny and his troops departed to confront the approaching Russian army but were defeated at Sedniv. Doroshenko did not want to send the support to Mnohohrishny until the Tatars will be able to do so. On 5 of October, Romodanovsky while not being able to capture the Tretyak raion of Chernigov, where he has met a strong resistance, lifted the siege and advances towards Putyvl.

== Battle ==
On 10 of October 1668, Grigory Romodanovsky sent a unit under command of his son Andrey southwards. Soon, the unit approached and entered the village of Gaivoron. It managed to cross a small ford, but while the Russians were about to cross the second, larger ford, they were unexpectedly attacked by the Cossacks and Tatars. Romodanovsky and Gvintovka noticed the enemy and attempted to coordinate the Russian reiters, but they were already attacked by the Tatars and fell into disorganisation and panic. Some of the Russian troops managed to escape to the swamp, were encircled and attacked by the Crimeans. while the others were killed or captured by the Cossacks and the Tatars. Remaining Russian forces retreated to Romodanovsky's camp and warned him about the approaching Tatar-Cossack forces.

== Aftermath ==
The Allied forces inflicted a heavy defeat on the Russian army, capturing all three commanders including Romodanovsky's son Andrei. On the next day, the Tatar-Cossack army clashed with the Russians at Konotop and inflicted a heavy losses on them in the course of 5-day battle, but once again failed to achieve a complete victory as the Russian army retreated towards Putyvl. The victories at Gaivoron and Konotop did not bring a strong control over the Left-bank for Doroshenko as the Crimean Tatars switched to the side of Petro Sukhoviy, who was elected by the Zaporozhian Cossacks as "Hetman of the Zaporozhian Host" in September of 1668. (Note: Although Sukhoviy initially did not take actions against Doroshenko's supporters, as soon as the October campaign ended, he started fighting the supporters of Doroshenko in order to overthrow him) In December 1668, Mnohohrishny was elected as the hetman of Left-bank Ukraine and in March 1669, he signed the Hlukhiv articles.

== Bibliography ==
- Babulin, Igor (2021). Бабулин И.Б. Война за возвращение Украины 1668–1669 гг.. [Babulin I.B. The War for the Return of Ukraine 1668-1669..] (in Russian). Russkie viti︠a︡zi. ISBN 978-5-907245-37-2.
