= Battle of Sevsk =

1668 battle in Russia

- Part of the Left-Bank Uprising, Cossack raids into Russia and the Russo-Crimean Wars
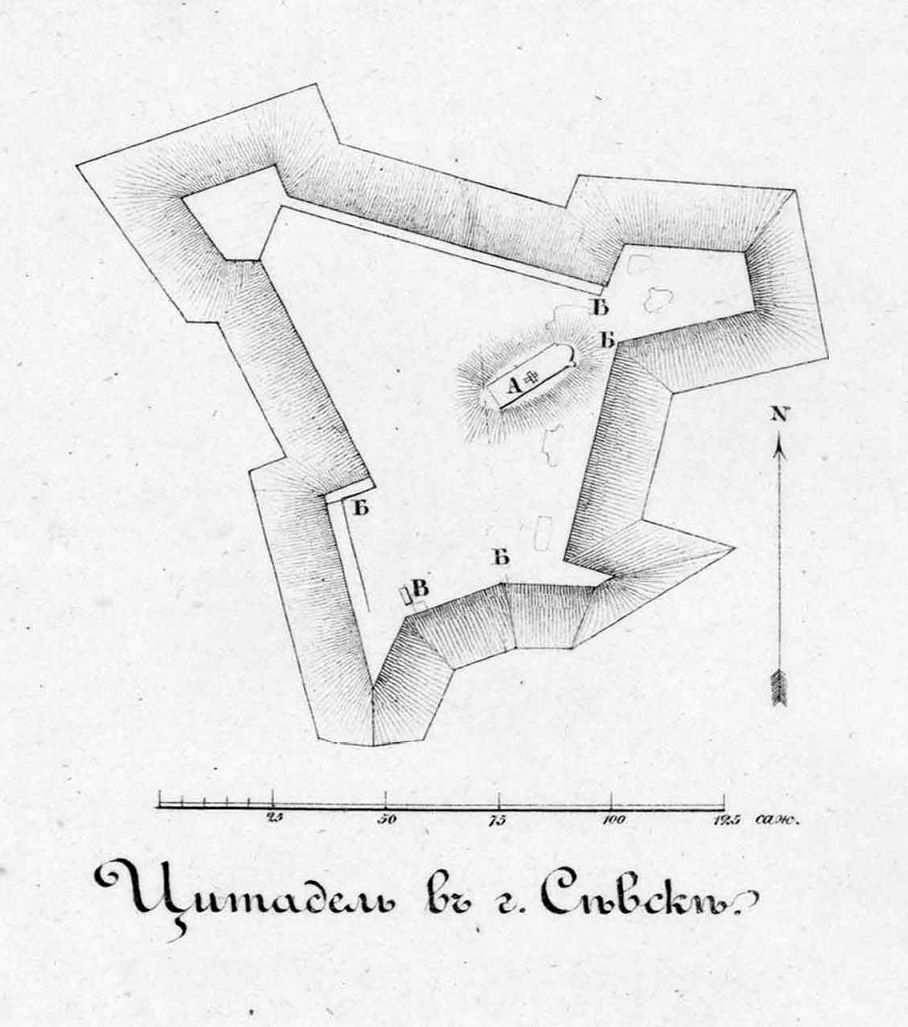
- 1839 map of the Sevsk fortress
| Date | 3–5 July 1668 |
| Location | Near Sevsk, Tsardom of Russia (now Russian Federation) |
| Result | Russian victory |

Belligerents
| Crimean Khanate; Cossack Hetmanate | Tsardom of Russia |

Commanders and leaders
| Muratsha-Murza; Ivan Bugay (POW) | Grigory Kurakhin; P.A. Dolgorukov; M.S. Volynskiy |

Strength
| 10,000 to 17,000 men | 23,000 men |

Casualties and losses
| Over 3,000 casualties Many captured | Unknown |

The Battle of Sevsk (Note: Russian: Битва под Севском Ukrainian: Битва під Севськом) was a battle that took place on 3–5 July 1668 near the Russian city of Sevsk. A 23,000-strong Russian unit of Grigory Kurakhin lifted the siege of Hlukhiv and withdraw to the Russian territory, knowing about the invasion of a major Tatar-Cossack force, which was previously sent by Doroshenko to divert the Russian troops from Ukraine. His force decisively defeated the raiders, which later became one of the reasons of Doroshenko's withdrawal from Left bank.

== Background ==
In March 1668, a large Russian army under prince Grigory Romodanovsky was sent into the Left-bank Ukraine. Main force led by Romodanovsky himself besieged Kotelva and Opishnya, while its smaller parts under prince Grigory Kurakhin besieged Hlukhiv. In June, Right-bank hetman Petro Doroshenko crossed the Dnieper, deposed and killed Ivan Briukhovetsky and was declared as a "hetman of both sides of the Dnieper". He then had set off with his Tatar allies in order to push the Russians out of Ukraine. Knowing about the approaching army, Romodanovsky lifted the siege and started withdrawing to Putyvl. However, on 12 of June, Doroshenkos army caught up with the Russians and inflicted a heavy casualties but failed to completely rout them, although achieving the strategic goal of pushing them out of the Left bank. On 22 of June, a large Tatar-Cossack force started an incursion into the Russian territory from Romny. The raid was initially successful, as it forced Kurakhin to lift the siege of Hlukhiv. To repel the invasion, three Russian armies under the command of Grigory Kurakhin, P.A. Dolgorukov and M.S. Volynskiy were sent. Total strength of this force was approximately 23,000 men.

== Battle ==
Although the Russian army was numerically superior, the attack could have succeeded due to the element of surprise. However, Kurakhin managed to delay the main attack by sending cavalry units to counter the invaders. The time he gained by diverting the main Tatar force was used to prepare for the battle – he managed to quickly position the main forces of Russian army in front of the new rampart of Sevsk and block the approaches to the fortress, battle positions were taken and barriers erected. The first Russian defense line consisted of infantry units, while the second line consisted of cavalry. The flanks were controlled by cavalry and some of the dismounted dragoons. Perhaps hoping that the retreating Russian cavalry after the initial skirmish would disrupt the Russian infantry, on 3 of July Muratsha-Murza launched a major assault on the Russian positions, but it was quickly repelled by fire. Due to heavy losses, the invaders started retreating from Sevsk and moved deeper into Russian territory. Kurakhin then started pursuing the retreating Tatars and Cossacks. On the Svinoy Shlyakh, northeast of the village of Baldyzh, Kurakhin caught up with and completely routed them. Ivan Bugay, who previously defended Kotelva from the Russians, was captured during the battle.

== Aftermath ==
Soon after the Russian victory at Sevsk, Doroshenko withdrew from the Left-bank Ukraine and left Demian Mnohohrishny as an acting hetman. Kurakhin received an order from the tsar to launch an incursion into Ukraine with the goal of helping the garrisons in Nizhyn and Chernihiv. Kurakhin however ignored this order and besieged Hlukhiv on 1 of August for the second time, but due to strong resistance from the local garrison, he was forced to withdraw. The defeat at Sevsk was one of the reasons why the Left-bank Cossack uprising eventually failed.

== Bibliography ==
- Malov, Aleksandr Vitalyevich (2006). Московские выборные полки солдатского строя в начальный период своей истории, 1656–1671 гг (in Russian). Древлехранилище. ISBN 978-5-93646-106-4.
