= Sieges of Hlukhiv (1668) =

1668 Russian sieges of Hlukhiv

- Part of Left-bank Uprising
Date	31 March – 25 June 1668 (first siege); 1–15 August 1668 (second siege)
Location	Hlukhiv, Nizhyn Regiment, Cossack Hetmanate
Result	Cossack victory

Belligerents
Cossack Hetmanate; Crimean Khanate	Tsardom of Russia

Commanders and leaders
Pylyp Umanets	Grigory Kurakhin; Matvey Krovkov; I. Shepelev; Nikita Davidov (WIA)

Strength
First siege: 2,200 men Second siege: Unknown	First siege: 3,062 men (Note: In Shepelev's regiment); 15 cannons Second siege: Unknown

Casualties and losses
Unknown	Heavy

The Sieges of Hlukhiv (Note: Ukrainian: Облоги Глухова. Russian: Осады Глухова.) were two sieges of the city of Hlukhiv by the Russian army in the course of Left-Bank uprising. The first siege took place as a part of Romodanovsky's March expedition to Ukraine and lasted until it was lifted once the army of Petro Doroshenko pushed Romodanovsky from Ukraine. The second siege took place after Doroshenko's withdrawal from Left-bank Ukraine and ended in a failure as well.

== Background ==
On 19 of January 1668, Ivan Briukhovetsky declared about the breakup of diplomatic relations with the Russian Tsardom and started an armed mutiny against the Russian garrisons in Ukraine. On 10 of February (Note: According to other sources - on 27 of January), the Cossacks in Hlukhiv joined this revolt and destroyed a Russian garrison in the city, while the voivode Miron Kologrivov was captured and sent to Briukhovetsky. As soon as the news of the rebellion reached the Russian tsar Alexis, he started mobilizing troops in order to suppress the "rebellious cherkassians". The main army was formed in Belgorod and was led by Grigory Romodanovsky. Its goal was to capture Starodub and lift the siege of Kiev. On 15 of March, the Second vybornyi regiment entered Belev, from where it received an order to approach Hlukhiv. In the end of March, the Russian expeditionary force besieged Kotelva, where a Cossack garrison was stationed. The Russian forces started encircling Hlukhiv as well, thus beginning the first siege.

== Sieges ==
=== First siege ===
The siege began on 31 of March and for 2 months was fought almost without breaks. In April-May, the Cossacks were actively raiding the besiegers, which led to heavy casualties among them. Particularly, the Russians lost several dozens of soldiers wounded due to the Cossack raids. In June, after the siege of Kotelva was lifted and the inconclusive battle of Khukhra was fought, the Russian units that participated in the March campaign and the siege of Hlukhiv began to withdraw. On 22 of June, the Second regiment withdrew to Sevsk. On 25 of June, Shepelev inspected the Russian army at Hlukhiv. The remaining Russian troops lifted the siege and withdrew in order to protect the Russian territory from a major Tatar-Cossack invasion. (Note: According to Malov, the total strength of an army that was sent by Doroshenko to plunder Muscovy was 17,000 Tatars and Cossacks)

=== Second siege ===
In battle of Sevsk that took place on 3-5 July 1668, the Tatar-Cossack army of Muratsha-Murza and Ivan Bugay was humiliated by voivode Grigory Kurakhin. Soon after the battle, at the end of July, he went with army to Hlukhiv jointly with Matvey Krovkov, starting a new siege of the city. Thus, he violated the tsar's order to start an expedition towards Nizhyn and Chernihiv. The siege lasted until 15 of August, when Kurakhin's army withdrew towards Putyvl.

== Aftermath ==
In Putyvl, Kurakhin and Krovkov joined the army of Grigory Romodanovsky, which was preparing for a new campaign into Ukraine. Kurakhin explained his ineffectivity by being ill at the time of siege. The Russian army that participated in the sieges later took part in the siege of Chernihiv and in repelling the Tatar-Cossack attack near Konotop. In the March of 1669, Hlukhiv articles were signed in the city between Demian Mnohohrishny and the Russian Tsardom.

== Bibliography ==
- Kurbatov, Oleg (2022). Военные конфликты, кампании и боевые действия русских войск, 860–1700 гг. Том I (in Russian). ЛитРес. p. 980. ISBN 978-5-04-429176-8.
- Malov, Aleksandr Vitalyevich (2006). Московские выборные полки солдатского строя в начальный период своей истории, 1656-1671 гг (in Russian). Древлехранилище. ISBN 978-5-93646-106-4.
- Eingorn, Vitalii (1892). Иван Андреевич Шматковскій, протопоп Глуховскій и его сношенія с московским правительством (1653-1673 гг.): (Страничка из исторіи малорусскаго духовенства.) (in Russian). Г.Т. Корчак-Новицкій.
- Polovtsov, Aleksandr Aleksandrovich (1903). Куракин, Григорий Семенович - Русский биографический словарь А. А. Половцова. Источник: № 09: Кнаппе — Кюхельбекер (1903): с. 580—581.
