= Battle of Konotop (1668) =

Battle of the Left-Bank Cossack uprising

- Part of the Left-Bank Uprising
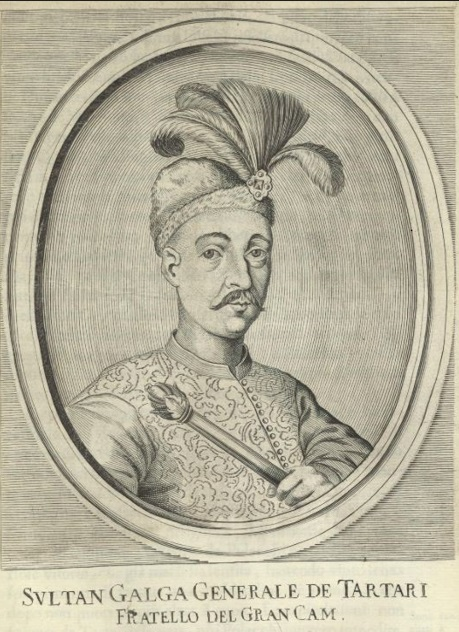
- Kalga Qirim-Giray who led the Tatar forces in their campaign on the Left-bank in October of 1668
Date	11- or 14-16 October 1668
Location	At Kukolka river near Konotop, present-day Ukraine 51.11°N 33.29°E
Result	See § Aftermath
Territorial changes	Russian forces withdraw from the Left-bank Ukraine

Belligerents
Cossack Hetmanate; Crimean Khanate	Tsardom of Russia

Commanders and leaders
Grigoriy Doroshenko; Qirim-Giray	Grigory Romodanovsky; Grigory Kosagov (WIA)

Strength
28,000	20,000 — 22,000

Casualties and losses
Heavy	1,112 dead, wounded or captured
- Location within Ukraine

The Battle of Konotop was one of the last battles in the course of Left-bank uprising. The Tatar-Cossack army of Grigory Doroshenko clashed with the Russian forces led by Grigory Romodanovsky near the city of Konotop (present-day Ukraine). Allied army inflicted heavy losses on the Russian army and forced it to abandon the Left-bank Ukraine but failed to achieve a complete strategic victory, which led to surrender of some Left-bank regiments led by Demian Mnohohrishny to Russia and eventual failure of uprising.

== Background ==
Following Doroshenko's withdrawal from the Left-bank Ukraine in July 1668, Romodanovsky invaded the region once again. In August 1668, he captured and massacred Nizhyn, and in September he lifted the siege of Chernihiv, as well as forcing Mnohohrishny to start negotiations following his defeat at Sedniv. However, the prolonged defense of the Tretyak raion in Chernihiv by Ivan Samoylovych eventually forced Romodanovsky to withdraw eastwards and leave his son Andrey to patrol the regained territory. On 10 October, his unit was attacked by the Tatar-Cossack detachment of Qirim-Giray and Grigoriy Doroshenko that was sent by Petro Doroshenko in order to regain control over the Left bank. The Russian unit was completely destroyed and Andrei was taken prisoner. Following this victory, the Cossacks and Tatars continued their advance.

== Battle ==
On 11 or 14 of October, Doroshenko's forces in the amount of 28,000 people that were chasing the remnants of Andrei Romodanovsky's army, approached Konotop, where Romodanovsky's army in the amount of 20,000-22,000 people was crossing the Kukolka river. The Cossacks and Tatars started attacking the Russian camp, however their attacks were repelled with heavy casualties. Romodanovsky was prepared for the Allied attack as some of the Russian soldiers that made it to his camp warned him about it. The defense of Russian camp continued, Romodanovsky faced heavy casualties as well. Eventually, his army managed to cross the river which allowed him to abandon his position near Konotop and retreat towards Putyvl. The Cossacks acted passively, due to this Qirim-Giray accused them of betrayal.

== Aftermath ==
Soon after the battle, the alliance between the Doroshenko's Cossacks and the Tatars was broken, with the latter declaring support to the Lower Host. Doroshenko's army lost a lot of people and failed to completely rout Romodanovsky. Grigory Doroshenko soon left the Left-bank Ukraine and withdrew to Kaniv, which allowed Petro Sukhoviy to start his campaign against the supporters of Doroshenko on the Left bank. Sukhoviy's supporters and Tatars that were previously allied with Doroshenko forced several Left-bank regiments to recognise his rule. Using the instability of Doroshenko's rule, Demian Mnohohrishny was elected as a hetman of Left-bank Ukraine in December 1668, and in March 1669 he signed the Hlukhiv articles with Moscow.

=== Result ===
While the battle itself ended in a Russian victory, most researchers agree that the October campaign was successful for the Tatar-Cossack allies, stating that "Doroshenko's appear on the Left bank forced Romodanovsky to withdraw". Romodanovsky's withdrawal was one of the reasons Grigoriy Doroshenko viewed his campaign as successful and disbanded his army.
