= Siege of Chernihiv (1668) =

1668 siege of Chernihiv by the Cossacks

- Part of the Left-Bank Uprising
Date	January – 20 September 1668
Location	Chernihiv, Chernihiv Oblast
Result	Russian victory

Belligerents
Russian Tsardom	Cossack Hetmanate

Commanders and leaders
Andrey Tolstoy; Pyotr Skuratov-Belsky; Grigory Romodanovsky; Ivan Fanbudenbrock †	Ivan Samoylovych; Demian Mnohohrishny

Strength
Garrison: 500 soldiers Romodanovsky's army: 20,000–24,000 soldiers	Unknown

Casualties and losses
Unknown	Heavy

Siege of Chernihiv (Ukrainian: Облога Чернігова) was a siege of the Russian garrison in the city of Chernihiv in the Left-bank Ukraine by the Zaporozhian Cossacks led by Ivan Samoylovych during the Left-Bank Uprising. The Zaporozhians were besieging the city until September, when Romodanovsky's reinforcements arrived there and unblocked Andrei Tolstoy's garrison.

== Background ==
Following the Truce of Andrusovo which had de-jure partitioned Ukraine between the Russia and the Polish-Lithuanian Commonwealth, the Cossacks led by Ivan Briukhovetsky who were dissatisfied with the treaty launched a major uprising against Russian rule in January of 1668. The Cossacks launched a wave of attacks on the Russian garrisons of the cities in Left-bank Ukraine.

== Siege ==
The siege began at the early stage of the uprising in January of 1668, when the Cossacks of Chernihiv regiment led by colonel Ivan Samoylovych besieged the city as was reported by Andrei Tolstoy to Moscow. Most of the city was captured by Cossacks, while the 500-strong garrison led by Andrey Tolstoy was besieged by them in the Upper small town of Chernihiv.

On 16 of February, Ivan Briukhovetsky sent a message to Tolstoy where demanded him to surrender, abandon the cannons and light weapons and retreat to Russia, however he refused. The defenders were conducting raids to the nearby villages. During these raids, the Russians managed to inflict heavy casualties on the besiegers, capture Hetman's flag and some Cossacks.

Following the unsuccessful invasion of Russia and defeat at Sevsk, Doroshenko's Cossacks and Tatars retreated from the Left Bank, which allowed the Russian army to launch a major campaign into Ukraine in September of 1668. On 17 September, Romodanovsky approached Chernihiv. Demian Mnohohrishny asked help from Doroshenko but did not receive ot due to Doroshenko's ongoing confrontation with Sukhoviy. On 19–20 September, Romodanovsky launched an assault on 19–20 September which led to firstly New and then Old towns of Chernihiv being recaptured by the Russians and the siege being lifted. Mnohohrishny meanwhile had set off to confront the Russian army but was defeated at Sedniv on 22 September. Remaining Cossack forces led by Samoylovych were besieged by Romodanovsky in Tretyak district of Chernihiv, which was not assaulted by Romodanovsky, who believed that Samoylovych would soon surrender himself. Romodanovsky however met a strong resistance there which forced him to retreat to Putyvl on 5 October.

== Aftermath ==
Following the successful lifting of the siege by Romodanovsky, Demian Mnohohrishny began peace talks with the Russian side, which led to his election as a hetman in December of 1668 and signing of the Hlukhiv articles in the March of 1669. In October, Doroshenko sent an army led by his brother Grigory that clashed with the Russian forces at Gaivoron and Konotop and temporarily pushed them from the Left Bank, however this did not bring a strong control over the Left Bank for Doroshenko as the Sukhoviy's Cossacks forced several Left Bank regiments to accept his suzerainty. The successful defense of Chernihiv by the Russian garrison, allowed the Russians to maintain their presence in the Severian land. Andrey Tolstoy, who was the key figure in the defense of Chernihiv, received a title of the Dumnyi dvorianin on 10 November 1668.

== Bibliography ==
- Babulin, Igor (2021). Бабулин И.Б. Война за возвращение Украины 1668–1669 гг.. [Babulin I.B. The War for the Return of Ukraine 1668-1669..] (in Russian). Russkie viti︠a︡zi. ISBN 978-5-907245-37-2.
