= Battle of Sednev =

Battle in an uprising against the Russian Tsardom

- Part of the Left-Bank Uprising
Date	22 September 1668
Location	Sedniv, Chernihiv region
Result	Russian victory

Belligerents
Russian Tsardom	Cossack Hetmanate

Commanders and leaders
Andrey Romodanovsky	Demian Mnohohrishny

Strength
Unknown	8,000

Casualties and losses
Unknown	Unknown

The Battle of Sednev is an episode of the Left-Bank uprising of the Zaporozhian Cossacks against the Russian Tsardom. Hetman Demian Mnohohrishny, appointed by Petro Doroshenko at the head of the Seversk regiments, stood in September 1668 with an army near Sednev, while the Russian army led by Grigory Romodanovsky assaulted Chernihiv.

Due to the fact that Romodanovsky's 24,000-strong army was significantly larger than the forces at the disposal of the Mnohohrishny, the latter did not dare to assist the besieged led by Ivan Samoilovich and waited for help from Doroshenko, which he almost did not provide.

Having taken the main part of Chernigov and unblocked the Russian garrison there, Romodanovsky sent part of the troops under Sednev, led by his son stolnik Andrey Romodanovsky. Mnohohrishny with "Cherkassy and Volokhi and Tatars with many" went out to meet the Russian army and a battle took place between them, as a result of which the army of the Mnohohrishny was put to flight.
