= Sevsky =

Sevsky (masculine), Sevskaya (feminine), or Sevskoye (neuter) may refer to:

- Sevsky District, a district of Bryansk Oblast, Russia
- Sevsky Urban Administrative Okrug, an administrative division which the town of Sevsk and four rural localities in Sevsky District of Bryansk Oblast, Russia are incorporated as
- Sevskoye Urban Settlement, a municipal formation which Sevsky Urban Administrative Okrug in Sevsky District of Bryansk Oblast, Russia is incorporated as
- Sevskoye (rural locality), a rural locality (a settlement) in Kaliningrad Oblast, Russia
