= Lists of Zaporizhian Cossack Hetmans =

Head of state of the Cossack Hetmanate

These are lists of Hetmans of the Zaporizhian and Registered Cossacks of Left-bank, Right-bank, and Ottoman Ukraine.

== List of Hetmans of the Registered Cossacks (1572–1638) ==
Hetmans (Seniors, Starszy, Старший) of the Registered Cossacks
Year	Hetman	Notes
1572	Jan Badowski	
1575–1576	Bohdan Ruzhynsky	
1578–1581	Michał Wiśniowiecki	Commanded the Registered Cossacks during the Livonian War.
1578–1582, 1584–1585, 1586–1587	Ivan Orishevsky	
1593–1596	Hryhoriy Loboda	with interruptions
1597–1598	Tykhin Baybuza	
1600	Havrylo Krutnevych	
1600–1602	Samiylo Kishka	Restored the Registered Cossacks (banned in 1596) in exchange for serving the king.
1603	Ivan Kutskovych	
1616–1622	Petro Konashevych-Sahaidachny	
(1619–)1621	Yatsko Borodavka (Yakiv Borodavka-Neroda)	elected Hetman by rebel unregistered Cossacks in 1619; confirmed Hetman by a general council of both rebel Registered and unregistered Cossacks in June 1621. Succeeded by Sahaidachny.
1622	Olifer Holub	elected by Cossacks
1623–1628	Mykhailo Doroshenko	From 1625, Cossacks were allowed to elect their own hetman.
1628–1630	Hryhoriy Chorny	
1631–1632	Ivan Petrizhitsky-Kulaga	
1636–1637	Vasyl Tomylenko	
1637	Pavlo Pavliuk (Mikhnovych)	Colonel of the Registered Cossacks, elected Hetman by rebel Zaporizhian Cossacks in July 1637, led the Pavliuk uprising (July–December 1637).
1637	Sava Kononovych	Hetman elected by a Cossack Rada (which also deposed Pavliuk), and recognised by the Crown.

== List of Hetmans of the Zaporozhian Host (Cossack Hetmanate, 1648–1764) ==
=== Hetmans of the united Hetmanate (1648–1663) ===
Hetman	Elected (event)	Took office	Left office	Notes
Bohdan Khmelnytsky (1596–1657); Зиновій-Богдан; Хмельницький	1648 (Mykytyn Sich)	26 January 1648	6 August 1657	died in office
Yurii Khmelnytsky (1641–1685); Юрій Хмельницький	death of his father	6 August 1657	27 August 1657	placed under Vyhovsky's regency until adulthood
Ivan Vyhovsky (c.1608–1664); Іван Виговський	1657 (Korsun)	27 August 1657 (confirmed: 21 October 1657)	11 September 1659	resigned
Yurii Khmelnytsky (1641–1685); Юрій Хмельницький	1659 (Hermanivka)	11 September 1659 (confirmed: 11 September 1659)	October 1662	resigned
Pavlo Teteria (1620?–1670); Павло "Тетеря"; Моржковський	1662 (Chyhyryn)	October 1662	27 June 1663	election of Ivan Briukhovetsky as hetman of Left-bank Ukraine led to the separation of the Hetmanate along the Dnieper

=== First division of the Hetmanate (1663–1668) ===
Right-bank Ukraine
Right-bank Hetman	Elected (event)	Took office	Left office	Notes
Pavlo Teteria (1620–1671); Павло Тетеря	1662 (Chyhyryn)	1663	1665	resigned
Petro Doroshenko (1627–1698); Петро Дорошенко	1665 (Chyhyryn)	1666	18 June 1668	achieved reunification of the Hetmanate

Left-bank Ukraine
Left-bank Hetman	Elected (event)	Took office	Left office	Notes
Ivan Briukhovetsky (1623–1668); Іван Брюховецький	1663 (Nizhyn)	27 June 1663 (confirmed: 27 June 1663)	17 June 1668	murdered by Doroshenko's supporters

=== Hetman of the reunited Hetmanate (1668) ===
Hetman	Elected (event)	Took office	Left office	Notes
Petro Doroshenko (1627–1698); Петро Дорошенко	1666 (Chyhyryn)	18 June 1668 (Note: Following the deposition of Ivan Briukhovetsky, on 18 June 1668 Petro Doroshenko was proclaimed hetman of all Ukraine. However, after the Polish invasion of the Right Bank later in the same year, Doroshenko was forced to leave Left-bank Ukraine and appointed Demian Mnohohrishny as its acting hetman.)	17 December 1668	apppointed Demian Mnohohrishny acting hetman of the Left Bank, restoring the Hetmanate's division along the Dnieper

=== Second division of the Hetmanate (after 1668) ===
Hetmans of Right-bank Ukraine under Polish suzerainty (1668–1712)
Hetman	Elected (event)	Took office	Left office	Notes
Petro Doroshenko (1627–1698); Петро Дорошенко	1666 (Chyhyryn)	17 December 1668	1669	defected to the Ottomans
Mykhailo Khanenko (1620–1680); Михайло Ханенко	1669 (Uman)	1669 (confirmed: 2 September 1670)	1674	resigned
vacant 1674-1675
Ostap Hohol (early 17th c.–1679); Остап Гоголь	1675	1676 (confirmed)	January 1679	died in office
vacant 1679-1683
Stefan Kunicki (c. 1640–1684); Стефан Куницький	23 August 1683	23 August 1683 (confirmed: 24 August 1683)	January 1684	died in office
Andriy Mohyla (c. 1610–1689); Андрій Могила	January 1684 (Nemyriv)	January 1684 (confirmed: 30 January 1684)	January 1689	died in office
Hryhoriy Hryshko (1649–1692); Григорій Гришко	1689 (Nemyriv)	1689	1692	died in office
vacant 1692-1693
Samiilo Samus (1656–c.1713); Самійло Самусь	1693 (Nemyriv)	1693	1704 c. 1713	resigned to Ivan Mazepa (Note: Samus offered the title and mace of the Right-bank Hetman to Ivan Mazepa. Mazepa refused, because he did not want to provoke a war between the Commonwealth and the Tsardom. Samus continued to lead his forces in rebellion against the Tsardom, including during Pylyp Orlyk's March on Right-bank Ukraine until his death around 1713.)

Sanjak-beys of Right-bank Ukraine under Ottoman suzerainty (1669–1683)
Hetman	Elected (event)	Took office	Left office	Notes
Petro Doroshenko (1627–1698); Петро Дорошенко	1666 (Chyhyryn)	March 1669 (Note: In 1669, Petro Doroshenko received the title of Sanjak-bey of Yedisan (Ottoman Ukraine, Khanska Ukrajina, or Dobusary) from Mehmed IV. This title existed in 1669 to 1683. Later, the title "Hetman by the Khan's Grace" appeared. Finally, the title "Hetman of Dubossary" was held by some people.)	19 September 1676	resigned to Ivan; Samoylovych
vacant 1676-1678
Yurii Khmelnytsky (1641–1685); Юрій Хмельницький	appointed by the sultan	1678	1681	deposed
George Ducas (c. 1620–1685); Георгій Дука	appointed by the sultan	1681	1683	deposed

Hetmans of Khan's Ukraine (under Crimean protectorate, 1684–1704)

- 1684–1685: Teodor Sulymenko
- 1685: Yakym Samchenko
- 1685–1695: Stepan Lozynsky
- 1696–1698: Ivan the Rich (Bahaty; "Hetman by the Khan's Grace")
- 1698–1709: Petryk Ivanenko (with interruptions)
- 1702–1704: Samiilo Samus

Right-bank hetman under Ottoman protectorate (1710–1714)
Hetman	Elected (event)	Took office	Left office	Notes
Pylyp Orlyk (1627–1698); Петро Дорошенко	1710 (Bender) (Note: On 5 April 1710 the Cossack Rada composed of veterans of the Battle of Poltava elected Pylyp Orlyk to succeed Mazepa as the Hetman of Ukraine in exile. Orlyk waged a guerrilla warfare at the southern borders of the Russian Empire with the support from Ottoman and Swedish empires.)	5 April 1710	1714	emigrated, succeeded by his son Hryhor Orlyk (died 1760) as hetman-in-exile

Hetmans of Dubossary

- 1714–1733: Kost Hordiienko
- 1765–1783: Yakub-aha Rudzevych

==== Hetmans of Left-bank Ukraine under Russian suzerainty (1668–1764) ====
Hetmans of the Zaporozhian Host
Hetman	Elected (event)	Took office	Left office	Notes
Demian Mnohohrishny (1631–1703); Дем'ян Многогрішний	1669 (Hlukhiv)	17 December 1668 (confirmed: 3 March 1669)	April 1672	arrested and exiled to Siberia
Ivan Samoylovych (1630s–1690); Іван Самойлович	1672 (Cossack Grove)	17 June 1672	August 1687	arrested and exiled to Siberia

Hetmans of the Zaporozhian Host on both sides of the Dnieper (Note: Following the disbandment of Cossack formations in the Polish-Lithuanian Commonwealth in 1700, the Hetmanate was preserved only in Left-bank Ukraine, which remained under Russian suzerainty. Nevertheless, Ivan Mazepa and his successors up to Kyrylo Rozumovsky would style themselves as "hetmans on both sides (banks) of the Dnieper" in official documents.)
Hetman	Elected (event)	Took office	Left office	Notes
Ivan Mazepa (1639-1709); Іван Мазепа	1687 (Kolomak)	4 August 1687	11 November 1708; 2 October 1709 (Note: Following his alliance with Sweden, on 11 November 1708 Mazepa was officially removed from his post by Peter I, but continued to be recognised as hetman by Charles XII of Sweden.)	removed
Ivan Skoropadsky (1646–1722); Іван Скоропадський	1708 (Hlukhiv)	6 November 1708	14 July 1722	died in office
Pavlo Polubotok (1660–1724); Павло Полуботок	appointed hetman	1722	1724	died in prison
Collegium of Little Russia (Stepan Velyaminov) 1722–1727
Danylo Apostol (1654–1734); Данило Апостол	1727 (Hlukhiv)	12 October 1727	29 March 1734	died in office
Yakiv Lyzohub (1675–1749); Яків Лизогуб	appointed hetman	1733	1749	died in office
provisional Hetman Government Administration 1734–1745
Kyrylo Rozumovsky (1728–1803); Кирило Розумовський	1750 (Hlukhiv)	22 February 1750	1764	resigned
Collegium of Little Russia 1764–1786 (Pyotr Rumyantsev)

== See also ==
- Hetman of the Zaporizhian Cossacks
- Hetman of all Ukraine, post invented by Pavlo Skoropadsky who proclaimed himself Hetman of all Ukraine after the 1918 Ukrainian coup d'état
- List of Kish otamans
- List of campaign otamans
- The Ruin (Ukrainian history)

== Bibliography ==
- Dyadychenko, V. Sketches of a social and political system of the Left-bank Ukraine at the end of 17th and the start of 18th centuries. Kyiv 1959.
- Smoliy, V. Hetmanate Ukraine. Kyiv 1999.
- Tairova-Yakovleva, Tatiana (2020). Ivan Mazepa and the Russian Empire (PDF). Montreal Kingston London Chicago: McGill-Queen's Press. p. 425. ISBN 978-0-2280-0309-0.
- Shcherbak, V. Hetmanate Institution. Encyclopedia of History of Ukraine. Naukova Dumka. Kyiv 2004.
- Hetman. Internet Encyclopedia of Ukraine. CIUS, Toronto.
