= Sevsk =

Sevsk (Russian: Севск) is the name of several inhabited localities in Russia.

Urban localities

- Sevsk, Bryansk Oblast, a town in Sevsky District of Bryansk Oblast; 52°9′N 34°30′E

Rural localities

- Sevsk, Kemerovo Oblast, a settlement in Burlakovskaya Rural Territory of Prokopyevsky District in Kemerovo Oblast
