= Left-Bank uprising =

Cossack uprising against Russia (1668–1669)

- Part of The Ruin
Date	January 1668 – winter 1669
Location	Left-bank Ukraine, Russian Tsardom (modern Ukraine)
Result	Uprising suppressed (See § Aftermath)

Belligerents
Tsardom of Russia; Polish–Lithuanian Commonwealth (Note: The Commonwealth forces had committed some small-scale raids against Doroshenko. Moreover, the supposed Polish invasion of Podolia forced Doroshenko to withdraw from the Left bank)	Cossack Hetmanate (Note: Initially only the Left-bank Hetmanate, later the war was led by a united Cossack state under Doroshenko); Sirko's Cossacks (Until mid 1669)	Sukhoviy's Cossacks (Note: Went over to Sirko’s side); Crimean Khanate (Also supported Doroshenko)

Commanders and leaders
Grigory Romodanovsky; Fyodor Repka †; Andrei Romodanovsky (POW); John III Sobieski	Ivan Bryukhovetsky (executed); Ivan Samoilovych; Demian Mnohohrishny; Petro Doroshenko; Ivan Sirko (Until mid-1669)	Petro Sukhoviy; Krim Giray; Murza Batyrcha (WIA)

The Left-Bank uprising or Bryukhovetsky uprising was an uprising of Cossacks dissatisfied with the Andrusovo truce against the Russian government. A series of military failures of the Crimean–Cossack army led to the entry of the Left-bank Ukraine into the Russian Tsardom, on the rights of autonomy.

== Background ==
A number of external and internal reasons led to the uprising. In 1665, Hetman Ivan Bryukhovetsky signed an agreement with Moscow, according to which the number of Russian troops on the territory of Ukraine was increased, and also the local population had to pay taxes to the Russian treasury. The Andrusovo truce caused discontent, concluded between Russian Tsardom and the Polish–Lithuanian Commonwealth, which cemented the split of Ukraine along the Dnieper.

== Battle of war ==
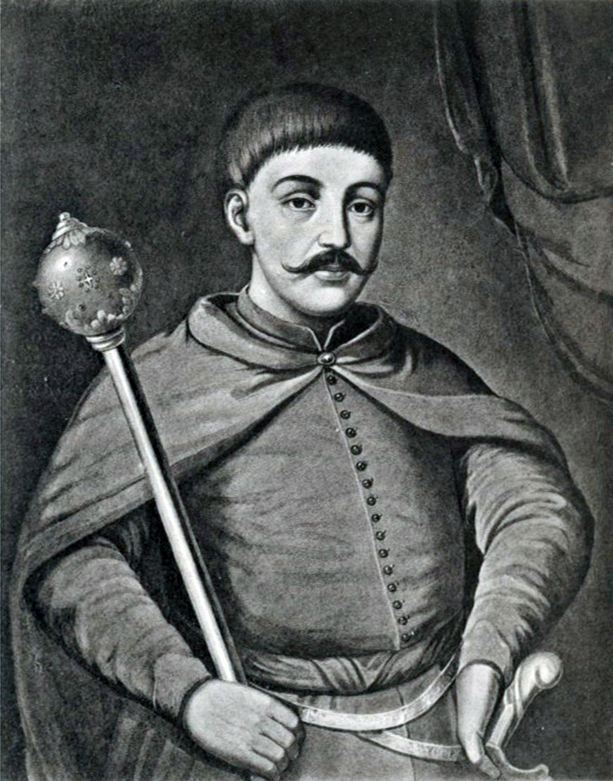
Hetman of Left-bank Ukraine, Ivan Bryukhovetsky

=== Initial phase ===
In early January, Bryukhovetsky with general officers and colonels of various ranks, decided to free themselves from the Russian power by swearing allegiance to the Turkish Sultan. They soon rebelled, killed or handed over Russian civil servants to the Tatars as prisoners, marking the beginning of the struggle.

In January, Samoilovich's Cossacks besieged Chernihiv, where there was a small garrison. As a result of the assaults, the Cossacks were able to take part of the city, but not the citadel. Similar attacks took place in various Ukrainian cities. As a result, by mid-March, the only cities where the Russian voivodes managed to hold out were Kyiv, Chernihiv, Pereyaslavl, Nizhyn and Oster. As soon as news of the rebellion reached Tsar Alexei, he sent an army under the command of Romodanovsky to Ukraine. Most of the Zaporozhian Cossacks were then in Kotelva. Romodanovsky laid siege to this settlement but was not able to capture it, the siege was eventually lifted by the forces of Doroshenko. Evidence suggests that Ivan Sirko could’ve been among instigators of the uprising, planning it during late 1667. Sirko launched a number of revolts during his campaign in Sloboda and Dnieper Ukraine, however, he was unable to transfer the uprising to the political centers.

=== Invasion of Left-Bank Ukraine ===
After the murder of Bryukhovetsky, Petro Doroshenko declared himself hetman and led a united Cossack–Tatar army against Romodanovsky. The Russians did not want to give a field battle right away, so they began to retreat hastily, almost completely leaving Ukraine. The Tatars and Cossacks overtook Romodanovsky's army at Akhtyrka and forced a three-day battle on it, their attacks were repulsed and the Russians continued to retreat according to their plan, with only a couple of cities remaining under their control, but of paramount importance. Doroshenko, being euphoric from his successes, decided to move the war to the territory of Russia, he attacked the city of Sevsk, but to his surprise, a new army of Prince Grigory Kurakin was waiting for him there, which completely defeated the Cossacks and the Crimeans in a two-day battle on July 3–5, which led to a rift in their camp, suffering significant losses, Doroshenko returned to the right bank, leaving behind only a small force. Romodanovsky and Kurakhin staged a new campaign. In mid-September, Grigory Romodanovsky's field army defeated Samoilovich and unblocked the garrison in Chernihiv. Before this, Russian army lifted the siege of Nezhin, where the garrison was repelling Cossack assaults for almost the whole year, losing 150 people as a result of the siege. The Ukrainian historian Zhelezko R. A. believes that the losses of the Cossacks amounted to 2,500, but Russian researchers Vladimir Velikanov and Yakov Lazarev consider this to be overestimated. Demian Mnohohrishny, who was placed by Doroshenko as an acting hetman, started peace talks. Petro Doroshenko sent a major Tatar–Cossack army under the command of his brother, Grigory Doroshenko, to the Left bank. Knowing about this, Romodanovsky began retreating from Chernihiv towards Putyvl, leaving only a small unit under the command of Romodanovsky's son, Andrey, behind. On 10, Andrey Romodanovsky was defeated near the village of Hayvoron by the Cossacks and Tatars, who then attacked Romodanovsky's main camp on the next day. Despite the fierce attacks, Romodanovsky repulsed all of them and withdrew to the Russian territory. In general, by the end of the autumn of 1668, the uprising was practically suppressed.

=== Sukhoviy–Doroshenko conflict ===
Petro Sukhovy rose to power in the right bank, supported by Krim-Giray, who was dissatisfied by the passive Cossack attacks during the clashes with Romodanovsky. He got into a conflict with Petro Doroshenko, who was supported by Ivan Sirko. According to Samiylo Velychko, after defeating the Russians at Hayvoron, Sukhoviy with his Tatar allies went to the Right-bank Ukraine while sacking Lubny and Lokhvytsia on the Left bank. Sukhovy and Doroshenko ultimately clashed at Chyhyryn from December 1668 to January 1669, ending with Doroshenko's victory after his ally Sirko defeated Sukhovy and his Tatar allies at the town of Olkhovets.

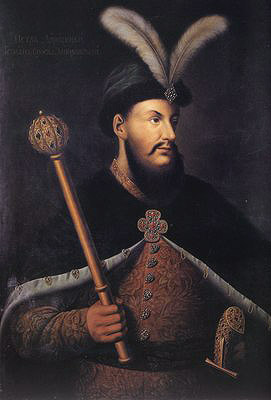
Petro Doroshenko

== Aftermath ==
The uprising was completely defeated from a military point of view. Bryukhovetsky was killed and Doroshenko failed to seize Left-bank Ukraine. Politically, Tsar Alexis had to make concessions to Hetman Mnohohrishny and Otaman Sirko, revising some provisions of previous laws, granting a higher degree of autonomy for Left-bank Hetmanate and Zaporozhian Sich as part of Hlukhiv articles. The Cossacks were not satisfied with the content of these articles, which provoked unarmed resistance from the Ukrainian authorities, which was soon broken. Moscow still held the left bank with an iron grip because it could keep its garrisons in key cities, for example, in 1672, Hetman Mnohohrishny was overthrown in the Baturyn coup and replaced with a more compliant Samoylovych. The publication of Hlukhiv articles did not solve the Cossacks' task of increasing autonomy, they were still on a "short leash" from Moscow. The main task for which the uprising was launched was the complete withdrawal of the Muscovites from the territory of Ukraine, but this failed, Romodanovsky strongly rejected this request, agreeing to other ways of granting autonomy that did not prevent the Russians from controlling the region. Availability Russian garrisons in the most important cities of Ukraine, as well as the Belgorod razryad. stationed nearby, completely controlled the region. In order for Samoilovich to be elected exactly as the Moscow government wanted, 20,000 Russian troops gathered in 1672 during the Election Council, and as a result, Samoilovich was unanimously elected. Trying to justify his rights to Ukraine, Romodanovsky, in negotiations with the Cossacks, stated:

Bohdan Khmelnytsky became the subject of the Great Sovereign and served him faithfully to his death. But what happened after him? You had hetmans Ivashka Vyhovsky, Iuraska Khmelnytsky, Ivashka Briukhovetskyi - and they all compiled treaty articles, signed them in their own hands, and pledged their souls upon them... and then betrayed them.
