= Ivan Petrizhitsky-Kulaga =

Ivan Petrizhitsky-Kulaga, also Petrazhytsky-Kulaha (Ukrainian: Іван Петражицький-Кулага; ca. 1570 – 1632) was a hetman of the Registered Cossacks in the years 1631–32. Seen as a supporter of the Polish–Lithuanian Commonwealth, he was stripped of his hetman position in an internal Cossack conflict and executed in 1632.

== Biography ==
The Petrazhytskys' coat of arms

Petrizhitsky-Kulaga was born around 1570 into a notable Cossack family. Little is known from his earlier years. He participated in the battle of Chocim (Khotyn) in 1621 and, later, in large scale Cossack expeditions against the Ottomans in 1628 and 1630.

Petrizhitsky-Kulaga succeeded the hetman Tymofii Orendarenko after the Cossack hetman election in 1631. He was seen as a supporter of Poland. Shortly after his election in 1631 he handed the Swedish diplomats l'Admiral and Des Greves, who attempted to negotiate with the Cossacks, to the Polish government.

He is remembered for submitting the Cossack petition at the election sejm of 1632. In this petition, the Cossacks requested that they, as warriors and defenders of the state, be given full political equality with the Polish nobility (szlachta). They also asked that the Cossacks be allowed to participate in the royal election. Not only did the Polish senators reject the petition, but in response to the Cossacks' describing themselves in the petition as the "limbs of the nation", they infamously replied that the Cossacks were like nails or hair that needs to be cut down.

That same year Petrizhitsky-Kulaga declared his support for the newly founded Kyiv-Mohyla Academy. His unpopular stance as a Polish loyalist and an internal power struggle among the Cossacks triggered a coup d'etat. He was accused of supporting the unpopular Uniate sect (see Union of Brest). His opponents, supported by bishop Isaia Kopynsky, elected a new hetman. Petrizhitsky-Kulaga himself was executed in Kiev later that year by other Cossacks and succeeded as hetman by Andrii Didenko.
