= Pereyaslavl =

Pereyaslavl (Russian: Переяславль) or Pereiaslavl (Ukrainian: Переяславль) may refer to:

- Pereslavl-Zalessky, a town in the Yaroslavl Oblast in Russia, called Pereyaslavl until the 15th century
- Pereyaslavl-Ryazansky, renamed Ryazan in 1778
- Pereiaslav, a town in Kyiv Oblast in Ukraine (was Pereiaslav-Khmelnytskyi in 1943-2019); historically, also called Pereyaslavl Russkiy and Pereyaslavl Yuzhniy
- Principality of Pereyaslavl or Principality of Pereiaslavl, a medieval Eastern Slavic state of the Rus from 1175 to 1302
