= Sevsky District =

Sevsky District Севский район (Russian)
- District
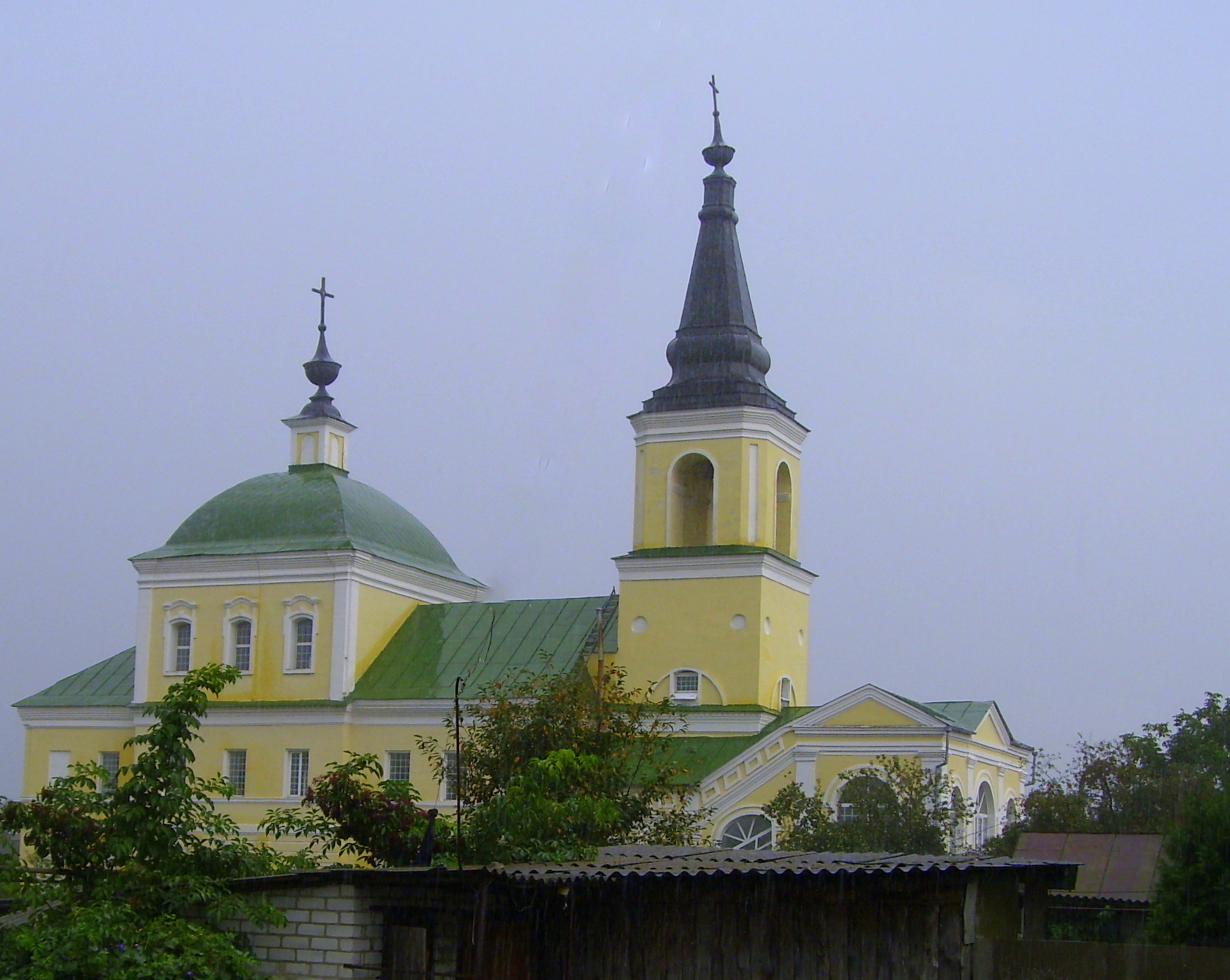
- Peter and Paul Church, Sevsk

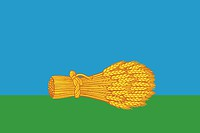
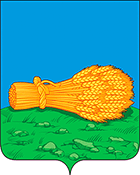
- Flag Coat of arms
- Location of Sevsky District in Bryansk Oblast
- Coordinates: 52°09′N 34°29′E
- Country: Russia
- Federal subject: Bryansk Oblast
- Established: 1929
- Administrative center: Sevsk

Area
  - Total: 1,220 km^{2} (470 sq mi)

Population (2010 Census)
  - Total: 16,923
  - Density: 13.9/km^{2} (35.9/sq mi)
  - Urban: 43.0%
  - Rural: 57.0%

Administrative structure
  - Administrative divisions: 1 Urban administrative okrugs, 7 Rural administrative okrugs
  - Inhabited localities: 1 cities/towns, 82 rural localities

Municipal structure
  - Municipally incorporated as: Sevsky Municipal District
  - Municipal divisions: 1 urban settlements, 7 rural settlements
- Time zone: UTC+3 (MSK)
- OKTMO ID: 15648000
- Website: http://www.sevskadm.ru/

Sevsky District (Russian: Се́вский райо́н) is an administrative and municipal district (raion), one of the twenty-seven in Bryansk Oblast, Russia. It is located in the southeast of the oblast. The area of the district is 1,220 square kilometers (470 sq mi). Its administrative center is the town of Sevsk. Population: 14,159 (2021 census); 16,923 (2010 census); 18,759 (2002 Census); 20,946 (1989 Soviet census). The population of Sevsk accounts for 47.5% of the district's total population.
