= Ivan Samoylovych =

Hetman of Zaporizhian Host (1672-1687)

Ivan Samoylovych Іван Самойлович
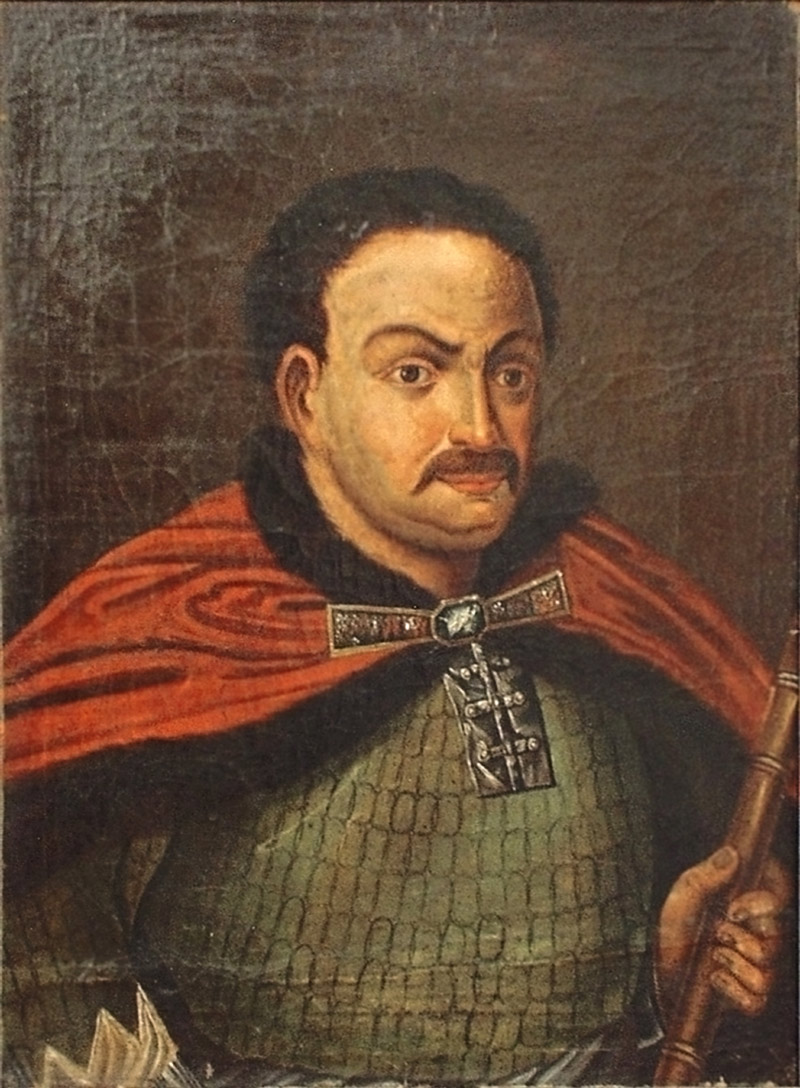
- Posthumous portrait, 19th century

Hetman of Zaporizhian Host
- In office 17 June 1672 – 1687
- Preceded by: Petro Doroshenko; Demian Mnohohrishny (as Moscow's appointee)
- Succeeded by: Ivan Mazepa

Personal details
- Born: 1630s Khodorkiv, Polish–Lithuanian Commonwealth
- Died: 1690 Tobolsk, Siberia, Tsardom of Russia
- Education: Kyiv Mohyla Academy
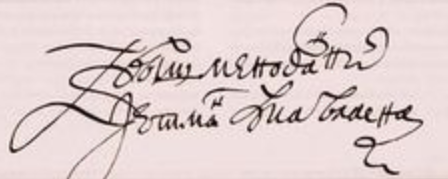
- Signature

Ivan Samoylovych or Samoilovych (Old Ukrainian: Іванъ Самуйлович / Иванъ (Іоан(н)ъ) Самойловичъ; Ukrainian: Іван Самойлович, Russian: Ива́н Самойло́вич, Polish: Iwan Samojłowicz; died 1690) was the Hetman of Left-bank Ukraine from 1672 to 1687. His term in office was marked by further incorporation of the Cossack Hetmanate into the Tsardom of Russia and by attempts to win Right-bank Ukraine from Poland–Lithuania.

== Biography ==
=== Early years ===
Ivan Samoilovych was born into a priest's family in Khodorkiv near Skvyra. He studied at the Kyiv Mohyla Collegium and later moved to Left-bank Ukraine together with his father. There Samoilovych served as a sotnia scribe in Pryluky Regiment, and was eventually promoted to the position of sotnyk in Vepryk, Hadiach Regiment. In 1663 he took part in a dilomatic mission to Moscow, and in 1665 was appointed colonel by hetman Ivan Briukhovetsky.

Following Briukhovetsky's revolt against the Tsardom of Russia, Samoilovych supported Demian Mnohohrishny as a new hetman and swore allegiance to the Russian Tsar. In 1668-1669 he served as Chernihiv colonel, and in 1669-1672 took the position of General Judge. Securing Mnohohrishny's deposition, he was elected the Hetman of the Left-Bank Ukraine in Konotop on 17 June 1672.

=== Hetmanship ===
==== Internal policies ====
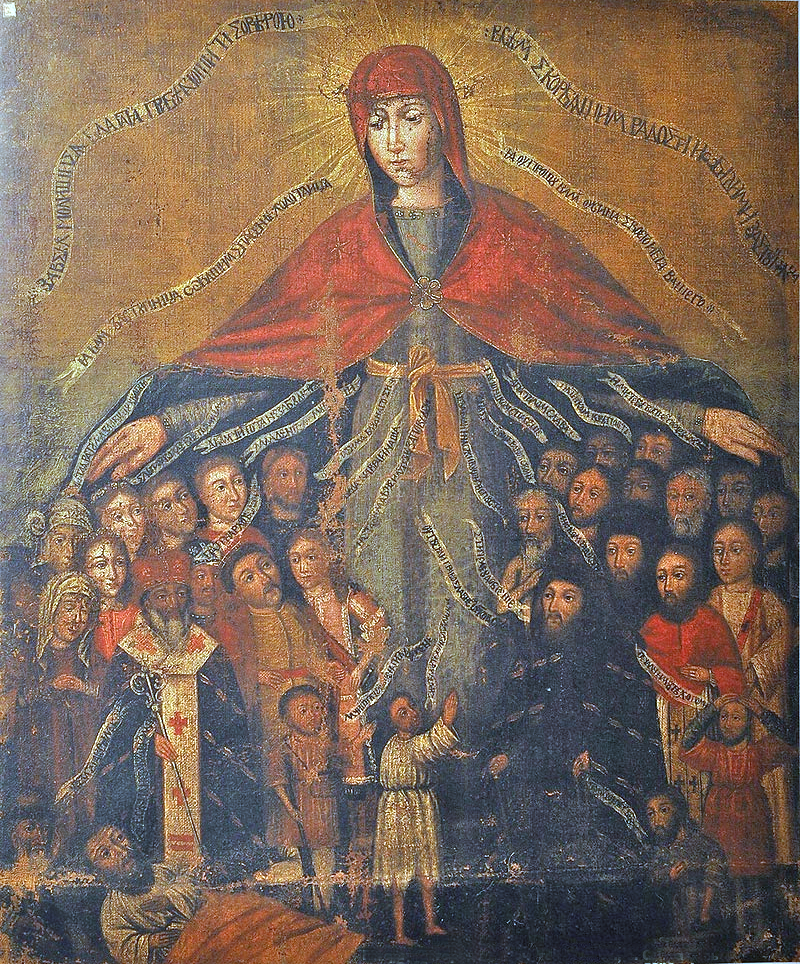
A 17th-century icon of the Virgin of Mercy from Stara Sil, featuring Samoylovych

In public affairs, Samoilovych paid great attention to stabilization of internal situation in Ukraine. In spite of Konotop Articles, which prohibited the hetman from using mercenary troops, he took care of the expansion of serdiuk infantry and kompaniyski cavalry regiments, as well as dragoons. He also contributed to the strengthening of the state elite. During the years of Samoilovych's hetmanship, the privileged group of the state elite known as Bunchuk comrades was introduced. Under subsequent hetmans, they became a source of personnel for public administration. Hetman's residence of Ivan Samoilovych was located in Baturyn (modern Chernihiv region). Under his rule Baturyn received the status of the only administrative centre of the Ukrainian Cossack state.

In domestic policies, the hetman paid great attention to the Metropolitanate of Kyiv, which was the center of fostering of the national idea of the Ukrainian state, and the center of unity for the Ukrainian people. Ivan Samoilovych maintained close relations with the leaders of the Orthodox Church of Ukraine, received assistance from them in resolving various state issues. The hetman also sought support for the Ukrainian state among the centers of world Orthodoxy. For example, Samoilovych was one of the first Ukrainian rulers who provided charitable assistance for the construction of the monastery of Zograf (Bulgarian monastery) on Mount Athos. Furthermore, Samoilovych initiated active church building in the Ukrainian lands. With his support, the construction of the Trinity Cathedral, the main church of the Hetman's capital, was completed in Baturyn. Grandiose church construction at this time was also carried out in other cities of Ukraine, such as Hlukhiv, Poltava, Lubny and Chernihiv. Samoilovych also financed the expansion of Mhar Monastery. At the same time, his rule saw the ultimate subordination of Ukrainian Church to the Patriarchate of Moscow.

In general, Samoilovych's contemporaries described him as a wise and intelligent ruler, who had a knack of military command and diplomacy. Thanks to his policies, Left-bank Ukraine saw a revival of economic activity, restored trade with Western Europe and established ties with Muscovy, Black Sea-Balkan countries, Don and the Caucasus. Internal trade also developed along with various branches of industry, and cultural life of Ukraine saw a resurgence under the hetman's rule. At the same time, Samoilovych has been criticized for his authoritarian tendencies and view of himself as an absolute monarch; in documents produced by him and members of his family, the hetman was proclaimed to be the supreme ruler and master of the country, who ruled for life and could be deposed from his post only by God. In order to provide himself with succession, Samoilovych elevated his sons to positions of power, appointing them as colonels and providing them with large landholdings.

==== Foreign policies ====
During Samoilovych's rule, Ukrainian lands were officially divided between the Polish–Lithuanian Commonwealth and the Moscow State along the Dnieper River into the Left-bank Ukraine and Right-bank Ukraine (see Truce of Andrusovo of 1667). This division did not contribute to development of the country and Right Bank Ukraine remained to be a scene of constant wars of neighboring states. Therefore, the Hetman decided to unite the Ukrainian lands. In 1674 he began a military campaign in the Right-bank Ukraine. The population there suffered from constant struggle and wanted to regain the right to live freely in their homeland. So a significant part of them met the hetman's army without resistance. Moreover, thanks to them the supporters of the Polish king were unable to defeat Ivan Samoilovych. Petro Doroshenko, the hetman of the Right-bank Ukraine, played a decisive role in this campaign. He voluntarily agreed in 1676 to give up his power in favor of Samoilovych. Then it was possible to overcome the split in public administration.

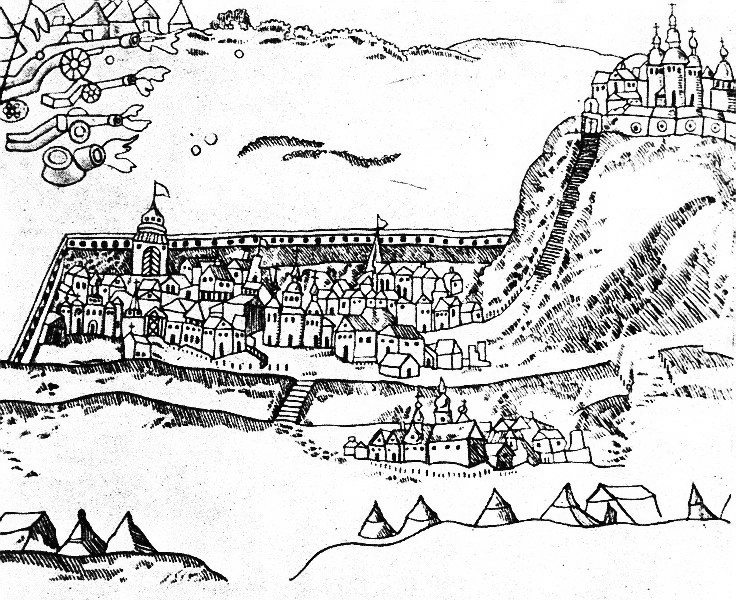
Ottoman siege of Chyhyryn in 1678

In order to establish control over the population, Samoilovych encouraged mass resettlement from the Right Bank into Left-bank Ukraine under his rule. After the joint campaign of hetman's forces and troops of Grigory Romodanovsky in 1674, he was proclaimed "hetman of both banks of the Dnieper", with the Cossack starshyna of right-bank Ukraine swearing allegiance to the tsar. However, following the arrival of Doroshenko's Ottoman allies, many inhabitants of the region started fleeing to the Left Bank. After the defeat of Cossack-Muscovite forces at Chyhyryn and proclamation of Yuri Khmelnytsky as new hetman of Right-bank Ukraine, Samoilovych ordered the forced resettlement of the remaining population of the area into lands of the Left Bank under his control. Many cities were destroyed by the hetman's forces, with their inhabitants being deported and barred from returning to their native lands under the fear of death.

In 1681 Hetman Samoilovych became one of the initiators of the Treaty of Bakhchisarai between the Turkish sultan and the Crimean Khanate on the one hand and the Moscow State on the other. According to the treaty, lands of the Right-bank Ukraine remained under control of the Ottomans, but their parts adjoining the Dnieper river were to remain unsettled. In order to accommodate refugees from those territories, Samoilovych petitioned the tsar to provide him control over Sloboda Ukraine or newly annexed southern areas. The tsarist government agreed to settle the refugees on the Siversky Donets river, but refused to administratively subordinate those lands to the hetman, leaving them under control of Russian voivodes. Samoilovych fiercely opposed the Eternal Peace Treaty of 1686, which finalized the partition of the Hetmanate between Muscovy and Poland.

=== Conflict with Golitsyn and downfall ===
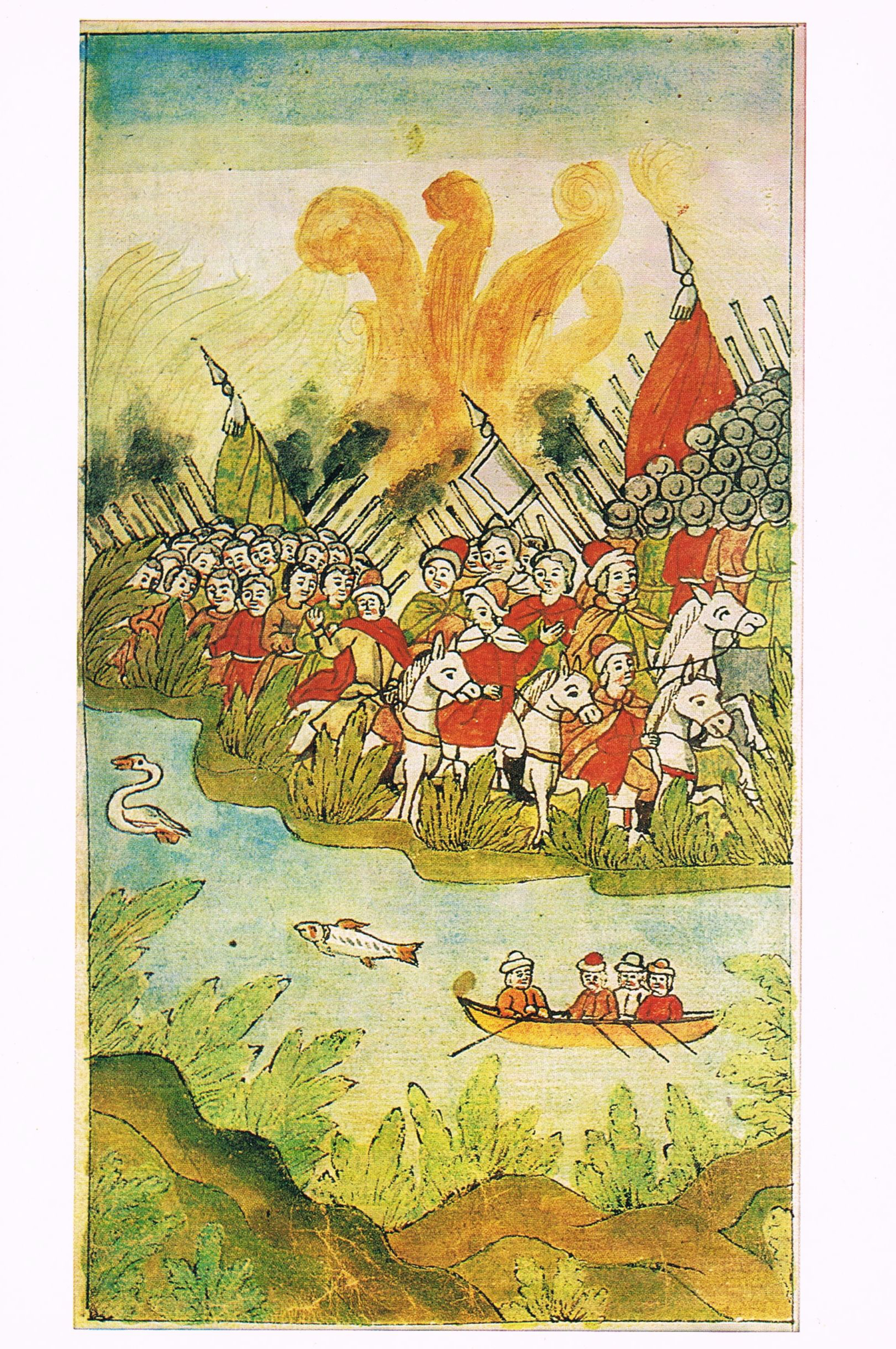
Golitsyn and Samoilovych's troops returning from the failed Crimean campaign, miniature from the 18th century

In 1679 Poland invited Vasily Golitsyn (prime-minister of Russia) to join the Holy League against the Turks. The Eternal Peace Treaty between Poland and Russia ran contrary with Samoylovych's plans to annex the Right Bank of the Dnieper, which still remained under Polish dominion since the Treaty of Andrusovo. Samoylovych attempted to persuade Russian boyars of Polish treachery but, failing in his design, sent an angry letter to the king of Poland. Despite subsequent apologies, this incident would eventually contribute to his downfall.

In 1687, Golitsyn and Samoylovych failed in their Crimean campaigns against the Crimean Khanate on account of steppe fires. It was rumoured that it was Samoylovych who had set the steppe on fire, because he preferred the Tatars to the Poles. Golitsyn, meanwhile, was exasperated at Samoylovych's friendship with Prince Romodanovsky, his old political rival, and finally resolved to replace him with a more tractable Cossack.

Samoilovych's authoritarian tendencies and despotism made him highly unpopular among the Cossack starshyna. As a result of a plot, members of opposition from the ranks of Cossack elite accused him of abuse of power, treason and secret contacts with the Crimean khan. In June 1687, Ivan Mazepa used the popular discontent with Samoilovych's haughty manners and high taxes to accuse him of separatism. Thereupon his youngest son, Hryhory Samoilovych, was incriminated in slandering the Tsar and executed in Sevsk. The old hetman and his family were arrested and exiled to Tobolsk in Siberia, where he died in 1690.

== Commemoration ==
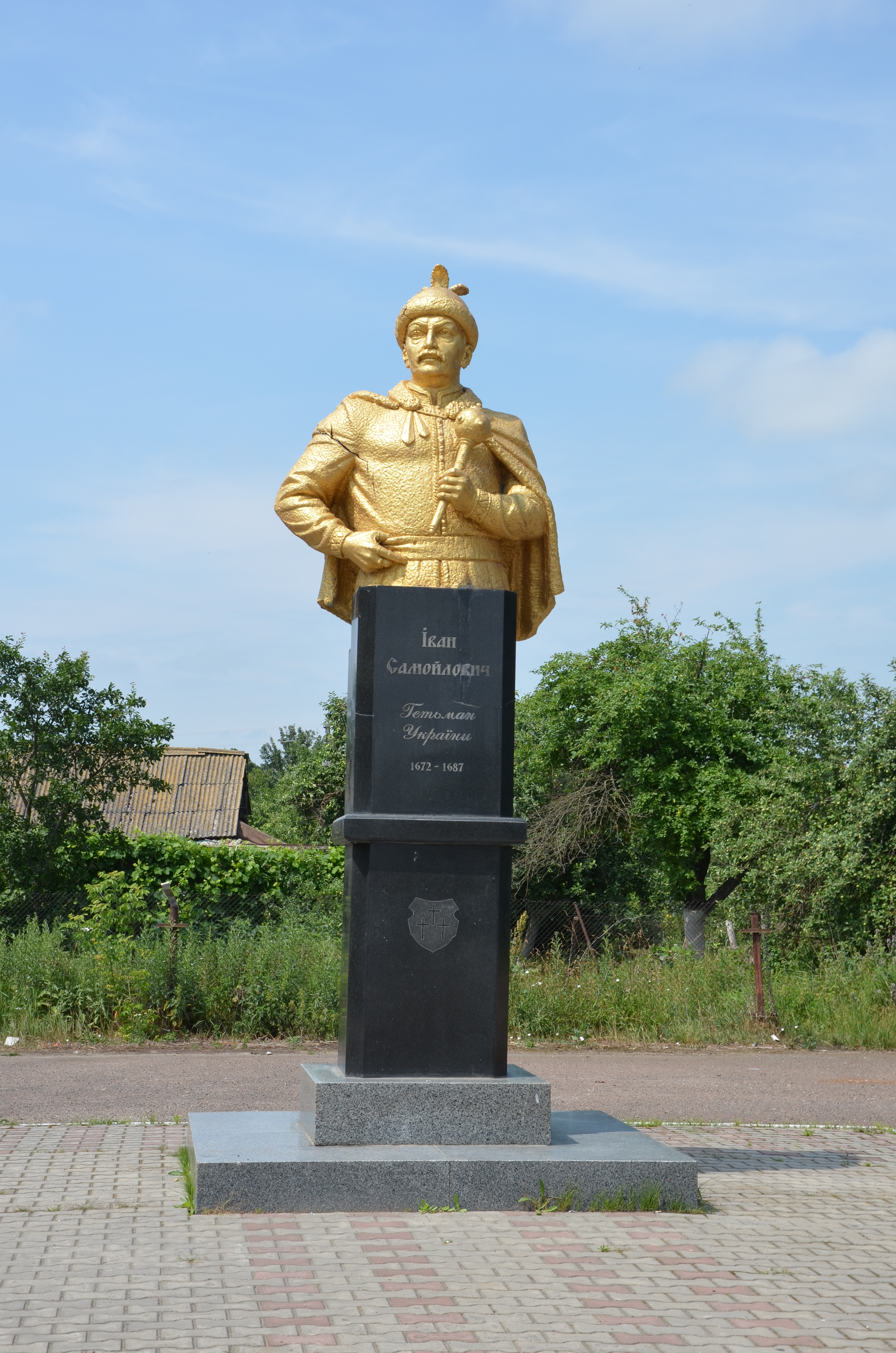
Statue of Samoylovych in Khodorkiv

- The monument to Hetman Samoilovych in the village of Khodorkiv. Author Ihor Zarichnyi, 2003.
- The monument to Ivan Samoilovych in Baturyn called "Prayer for Ukraine". Authors Bohdan and Mykola Mazur, 2009.
- The Ivan Samoilovych Street in Baturyn.
- The Ivan Samoilovych Street in Zaporizhzhia.

== See also ==
- Gedeon (Svyatopolk-Chetvertynsky)
