= Serdyuk =

Mercenary infantry units in southeastern Ukraine during the 17th and 18th centuries

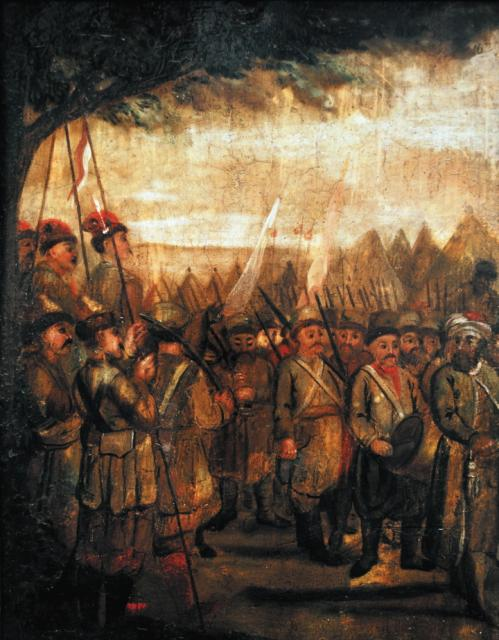
The Hetman's army on the march. Probably the serdyuk infantry. Part of a late 17th-century painting by an unknown Polish artist.

A serdyuk (Ukrainian: сердюк, pl. serdyuky) was a member of mercenary infantry units kept by the Hetman's Zaporozhian Host during the second half of the 17th century and the first quarter of the 18th century. They formed the Hetman's guard and were recruited mainly from the Ukrainian population of the Cossack Hetmanate and Zaporozhian Sich. The average serdyuk regiment consisted of 400–500 soldiers. They served at the border and inside the country, and guarded the Hetman's residence. By a decree of the Russian Tsar dated July 14, 1726, the existing serdyuk units were disbanded.

== Sources ==
- Бутич І. Л. Сердюки // Енциклопедія історії України : у 10 т. / редкол.: В. А. Смолій (голова) та ін.; Інститут історії України НАН України. — К. : Наук. думка, 2012. — Т. 9 : Прил — С. — С. 541. — ISBN 978-966-00-1290-5.(in Ukrainian)

=== Literature ===
- Сокирко О. Лицарі другого сорту. Наймане військо Лівобережної Гетьманщини 1669—1726 рр. — Київ: Темпора, 2006.(in Ukrainian)
- Українське козацтво. Мала енциклопедія. — Київ: Генеза, 2002. С. 442.(in Ukrainian)
