= Sevsk, Bryansk Oblast =

Town in Bryansk Oblast, Russia

Sevsk Севск
- Town
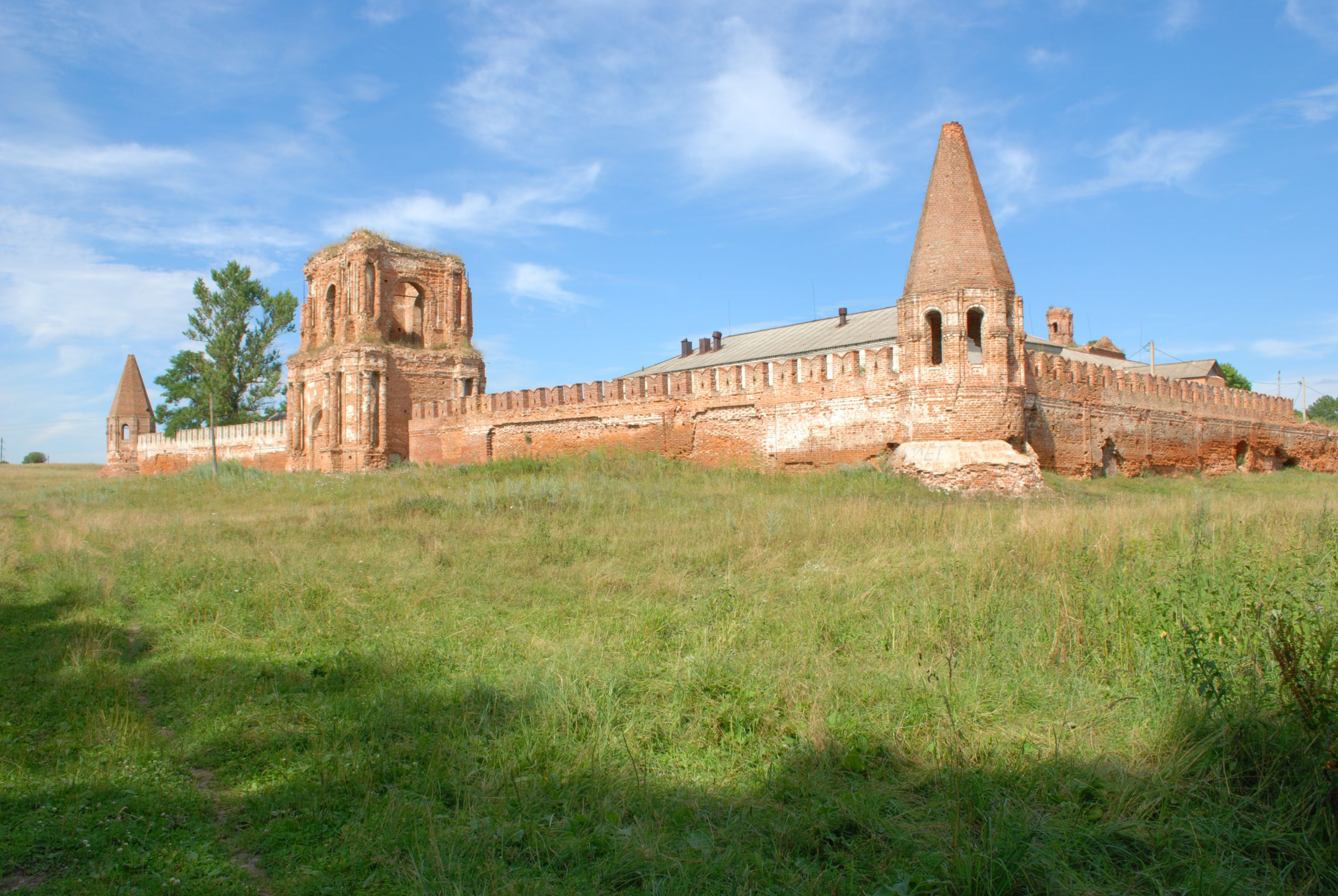
- Holy Transfiguration monastery

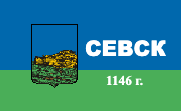
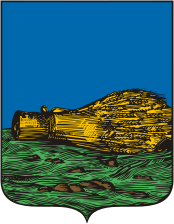
- Flag Coat of arms
- Interactive map of Sevsk
- Location of Sevsk Sevsk (Bryansk Oblast)
- Coordinates: 52°09′N 34°30′E
- Country: Russia
- Federal subject: Bryansk Oblast
- Administrative district: Sevsky District
- Urban Administrative OkrugSelsoviet: Sevsky
- First mentioned: 1146
- Elevation: 170 m (560 ft)

Population (2010 Census)
  - Total: 7,282
  - Estimate (2021): 6,732 (−7.6%)

Administrative status
  - Capital of: Sevsky District, Sevsky Urban Administrative Okrug

Municipal status
  - Municipal district: Sevsky Municipal District
  - Urban settlement: Sevskoye Urban Settlement
  - Capital of: Sevsky Municipal District, Sevskoye Urban Settlement
- Time zone: UTC+3 (MSK)
- Postal code: 242440
- OKTMO ID: 15648101001

Sevsk (Russian: Севск) is a town and the administrative center of Sevsky District in Bryansk Oblast, Russia, located on the Sev River (Dnieper's basin), 142 kilometers (88 mi) from Bryansk, the administrative center of the oblast. Population: 6,732 (2021 census); 7,282 (2010 census); 7,660 (2002 census); 7,820 (1989 Soviet census).

== History ==
Historical affiliations

Principality of Chernigov 1146–1356
Grand Duchy of Lithuania 1356–1569
Polish–Lithuanian Commonwealth 1569–1585
Tsardom of Russia 1585–1721
Russian Empire 1721–1917
Russian Republic 1917
Soviet Russia 1917–1922
Soviet Union 1922–1991
Russian Federation 1991–present

Sevsk is one of the oldest cities in the Bryansk region. Along with Novgorod-Seversky, Putivlem and Rylsk, it was one of the cities of the historical Severshchina. Archaeological research indicates the early settlement of the territory of Sevsk. Sevsk is first mentioned under 1146 in two chronicles — Resurrection and Ipatievskaya. At that time, the city was part of the Chernihiv-Seversk land. In 1356, it passed to the Grand Duchy of Lithuania.

In the reign of Ivan the Terrible the Sevsky Kremlin was fortified, garrison reinforced by guard Cossacks, who created a Cossack sloboda here. In the middle of the 17th century a Sev fortress was included in the system of newly created defensive guards along the south-western borders. The convenient location contributed to the creation of a strong fortress here, which played a significant role in the history of Russia. Sevsk was known as a major shopping center not only in Russia, but also in the West. In 1634, the siege of Sevsk / defense of Sevsk from the Poles played an important role in ending the Smolensk War. After 1683 and the city grew many times at the expense of streltsy and other service people, sent here from Moscow after Streletsky Revolt (1682)/ streltsy riots. At the end of the XVII century, a silver coin was minted in Sevsk for Ukrainian territories that became part of Russia — Sevsk Czechs. In 1687 at Sevsk, the 32nd Chernihiv Colonel was beheaded Grigory Samoilovich (son of hetman a Ivan Samoilovich).

In the XVIII century, the defensive importance of Sevsk as a border town weakened, as the borders were moved to the south and west. It organizes the civil administration. The city was granted a coat of arms and a general development plan. Military people are settling on the outskirts of the city. In Sevsk and its environs, there are still Streletskaya, Pushkarnaya, Soldatskaya Sloboda, and the village of Reitarovka.

With the division of Russia into provinces, Sevsk was included in the Kiev Governorate, in which in 1719 became the center of Sevsk province, which included 9 cities: Sevsk, Trubchevsk, Bryansk, Karachev, Kromy, Rylsk, Putivl, Nedrigailov and Kamenny with their districts (uyezds). In 1727 Sevsk was transferred to Belgorod province, divided into three provinces, of which Sevsk province was the most populous (out of the 700 thousand population of the province, it accounted for 300 thousand). In 1778 Sevsk becomes the center of Sevsky uyezd as part of Orel Viceroyalty. At this time, it was decided to rebuild the city according to a new plan, breaking it into regular squares. The inhabitants of the city were engaged in crafts, trade and Yamsky craft. In the 1880s, the first railway line ran through Sevsky uyezd, but Sevsk itself was left out of it, which affected the development of industry and trade. At the same time, much has been done in the improvement of the city: water supply was carried out, the central streets were gas-lit, the main street was paved with cobblestones. In the eastern part of the city, on the high bank of the Seva, a building of the zemstvo council was built. In the north-western part of the city in 1913, a large two-story building was erected, specially designed for the Sevsky Real School, established in 1909. The school became one of the cultural centers of the city, where literary evenings were held, concerts were arranged, and amateur performances were staged. In 1917, the mathematician Ivan Petrovsky, future rector of Moscow State University, graduated from the school.

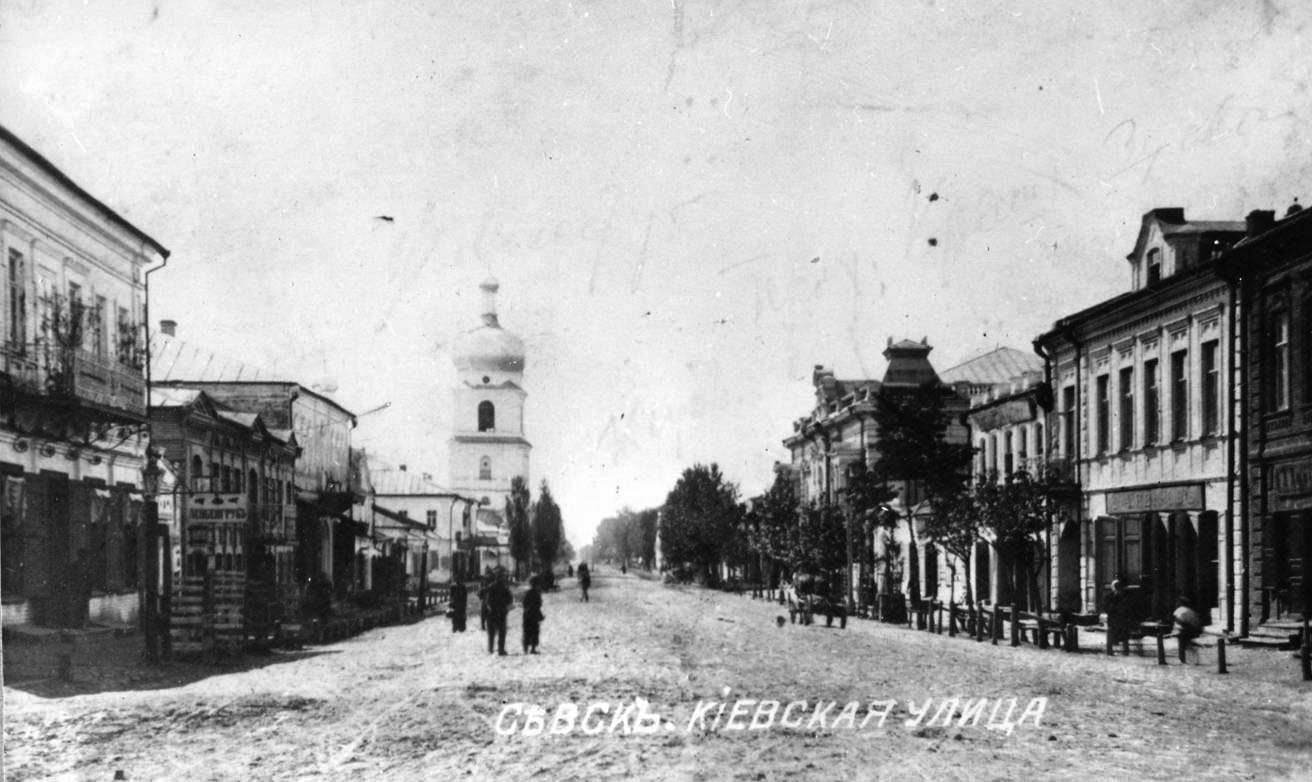
Early-20th-century view of Sevsk

1 October 1941 as part of Operation Typhoon 2nd panzer group Guderian, Heinz Wilhelm / Guderian Army Group "Center" broke through the defense of its central sector 13th army Of the Bryansk Front A. I. Eremenko to the full depth and advanced 60 km. On 1 October, 24th Motorized Corps occupied Sevsk. The city was liberated by the 2nd Panzer Army on 2 March 1943 as part of the Dmitriev-Sevskaya operation, but on 27 March was again captured by the Germans. Finally released in September 1943 as part of the Bryansk operation.

== Administrative and municipal status ==
Within the framework of administrative divisions, Sevsk serves as the administrative center of Sevsky District. As an administrative division, it is, together with four rural localities, incorporated within Sevsky District as Sevsky Urban Administrative Okrug. As a municipal division, Sevsky Urban Administrative Okrug is incorporated within Sevsky Municipal District as Sevskoye Urban Settlement.

== Architecture ==
Architectural monuments include the remnants of defensive walls of the medieval fortress and the churches of Kazan Virgin (1760), Ascension (1765), and Sts. Peter and Paul (1809). Sevsk used to have two cathedrals, one dating to 1782 and another to 1811. Both cathedrals were destroyed during Stalin's rule, but their bell towers still stand.

== Sister cities ==
- Bender, Moldova
- Dingwall, Scotland, United Kingdom
