= Demian Mnohohrishny =

Hetman of Ukrainian Cossacks

Demian Ihnatovych (Mnohohrishny) Дем'ян Ігнатович (Многогрішний)
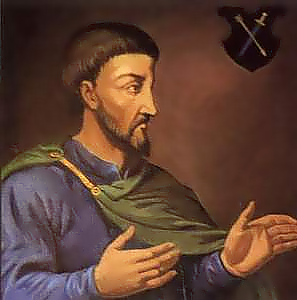

Hetman of Zaporizhian Host
- In office December 17, 1668 – March 12, 1672
- Preceded by: Petro Doroshenko; Ivan Briukhovetsky (as Moscow's appointee)
- Succeeded by: Ivan Samoylovych

Personal details
- Born: 1621 Korop, Chernihiv Voivodeship, Polish–Lithuanian Commonwealth
- Died: 1703 (aged 81–82) Buriatia, Tsardom of Russia
- Spouse: Anastasia
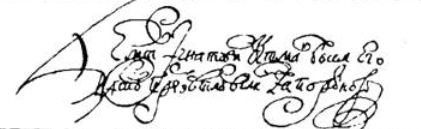
- Signature

Demian Ihnatovych (Ruthenian: Демко Ігнатович / Демянъ Игнатович(ъ), Ukrainian: Дем'ян Ігнатович; 1621, Korop – 1703), popularly known under the nickname Mnohohrishny (Ukrainian: Многогрішний, Polish: Damian Mnohohriszny, literally "of many sins") was the Hetman of Left-bank Ukraine from 1669 to 1672, during the period known as the Ruin. In 1689 he participated in signing of the Treaty of Nerchinsk and became de facto voivode of Buriatia (1691–1694).

== Biography ==
Demian Ihnatovych (Mnohohrishny) was born in Korop, Chernihiv Voivodeship (today part of Chernihiv region). He took part in the National Liberation War under the leadership of Bohdan Khmelnytsky. From 1665 to 1668 he held the government of Chernihiv Regiment. In 1668 Ihnatovych, as an opponent of the Treaty of Andrusovo, according to which Ukraine was divided along the Dnieper into the Right Bank under the control of the Commonwealth and the Left Bank controlled by Muscovy, took part in the anti-Moscow uprising. He was one of the first colonels to side with the Right Bank Hetman Petro Doroshenko, proposing him to unite all of Ukraine under his mace. According to the Eyewitness Chronicle, Ihnatovych relied on mercenary cavalry, including many Lithuanian and Polish soldiers.

In 1668 he was appointed acting hetman of Left-bank Ukraine. Lack of military assistance from Petro Doroshenko, strong Moscow garrisons in the Left Bank cities and pressure from the pro-Moscow part of the officers and the Orthodox clergy prompted Demian Ihnatovych to negotiate with the tsarist government. On December 17, 1668, by the decision of the Novhorod-Siversky Cossack Council, Ihnatovych headed the government in the Left Bank and on behalf of all the officers continued negotiations with the tsar. Moscow, however, did not recognize his title until the Hlukhiv Council in 1669. It was at the Hlukhiv Council that the Moscow state confirmed the election of Ihnatovych as Hetman of the Left Bank of Ukraine. One of the points of the Hlukhiv Articles proclaimed that from now on Baturyn would become the hetman's capital. Ihnatovych's residence was guarded by mercenary infantry commanded by rotmistr Petro Voroshylo.

== Domestic policy ==
Demian Ihnatovych pursued a policy aimed at protecting the state interests of Cossack Hetmanate:

- ensured that Kyiv and its district, despite the terms of the Andrusovo Armistice, remained part of the Left Bank;
- relied on regiments of comrades (free-lance regiments of cavalry) and sought to strengthen the hetman's power, gradually weakening the political role of Cossack officers;
- looking for allies in the fight against Moscow's expansion, he held secret talks with Petro Doroshenko about the possibility of the Left Bank Hetmanate entering protectorate of the Ottoman Empire.

Such a policy caused dissatisfaction among some of the senior officials. Nizhyn archpriest Simeon Adamovich wrote a letter with a denunciation of the hetman to Moscow.

On the night of March 12–13, 1672, Demian Ihnatovych was arrested in Baturyn with the support of the Muscovite garrison. The hetman and his brother Vasyl were brought to Moscow, where the trial began in mid-April 1672. After interrogation and torture in prison, they were accused of treason and sentenced to death, which was commuted at the last minute to exile in Siberia with their families. Until 1688 Ihnatovych was kept in the Irkutsk prison and Selenginsk to protect him from rebellious local tribes. In 1689, Demian Ihnatovych took part in the negotiations of the Ambassador of Muscovy Fyodor Golovin with China, which ended with the signing of the Treaty of Nerchinsk. After Golovin's departure, Ihnatovych ruled Selenginsk and his lands for several years as a "man of command." In 1696 the former hetman was tonsured a monk. The last mention of him in his lifetime dates back to 1701. Apparently, he died the same year and was buried near the Savior Cathedral in Selenginsk.

== Honoring the memory ==
A monument to Hetman Demian Ihnatovych has been erected in Baturyn as part of the monumental composition of Baturyn Hetmans "Hetmans. Prayer for Ukraine" (2008). A monument to Hetman Demian Ihnatovych was unveiled on October 20, 2016 in the Selenginsky district of Buryatia at the intersection of the Ulan-Ude-Kyakhta and Ulan-Ude-Dzhida roads, near Novoselenginsk. On December 14, 2018, a memorial sign in honor of the 350th anniversary of the election of Demian Ihnatovych as Hetman of the Left Bank of Ukraine was erected on the territory of the Savior-Transfiguration Monastery in Novhorod-Siversky.
