= Truce of Andrusovo =

1667 agreement ending the Russo-Polish War

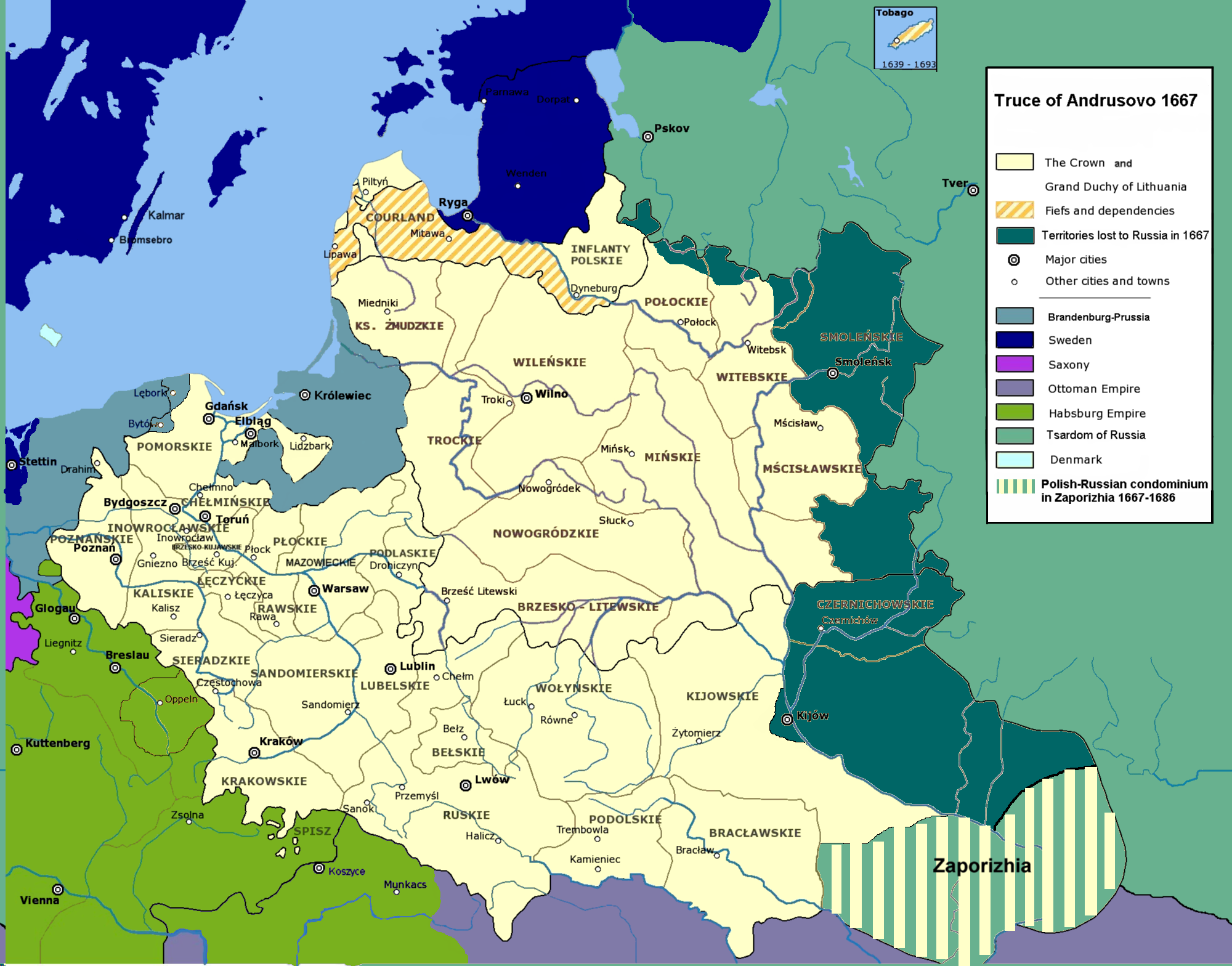
The Polish–Lithuanian Commonwealth in 1667: dark green indicates areas ceded to the Tsardom of Russia at Andrusovo

The Truce of Andrusovo (Polish: Rozejm w Andruszowie, Russian: Андрусовское перемирие Andrusovskoye Pieriemiriye, also sometimes known as Treaty of Andrusovo) established a thirteen-and-a-half year truce, signed on 9 February [O.S. 30 January] 1667 between the Tsardom of Russia and the Polish–Lithuanian Commonwealth, which had fought the Russo-Polish War since 1654.

Afanasy Ordin-Nashchokin (for Russia) and Jerzy Chlebowicz (for the Commonwealth) signed the truce in the village of Andrusovo not far from Smolensk. Representatives of the Cossack Hetmanate were not allowed.

== Terms ==
The Polish–Lithuanian Commonwealth and the Tsardom of Russia agreed on the following terms:

- A truce was signed for 13.5 years during which both states were obligated to prepare the conditions for eternal peace.
- Russia secured the territories of Left-bank Ukraine, Siever lands, and Smolensk.
- Poland-Lithuania was left with Right-bank Ukraine, and Russian-occupied Belarus with Vitebsk, Polotsk, and Dzwinsk.
- The city of Kiev, though situated on the right bank of the Dnieper River, was handed over to Russia for two years under a series of conditions. The transfer, though phrased as temporary, was, in fact, a permanent one cemented in 1686 in exchange for 146,000 rubles.
- The Zaporozhian Sich was recognized as a condominium of both states.
- Both states agreed to provide a common defence against the Ottoman Empire.
- The right of free trade was granted.
- A compensation from Russia to Poland-Lithuania of 1,000,000 złotych or 200,000 rubles was agreed on for the lands of Left-bank Ukraine.

== Consequences ==
The transfer of Kiev to the Russian tsardom had far-reaching consequences. Kiev, situated in the Greek-Orthodox part of the Lithuanian Grand Duchy before the Union of Lublin (1569) and in the Polish kingdom thereafter, was the seat of the orthodox metropolitan, who, despite being formally placed under the Roman pope since the Union of Brest (1596), retained authority over the Orthodox population in Poland-Lithuania's eastern territories. Prior to Andrusovo, Kiev had been an orthodox counterweight to the Moscow patriarchate, founded in 1589, and since the metropolitanship of Petro Mohyla hosted the Mohyla Academy, that opened orthodoxy to Western influence. The transfer of Kiev to Russia came only days after patriarch Nikon, who reformed the rites within the Muscovite patriarchate, had won the upper hand over his adversary Avvakum, resulting in an intra-Russian schism (raskol) between the Reformed Orthodoxy and the Old Believers.

Kiev now supplied the Russian patriarch with an academy (after Mohyla's offer to found an academy in Moscow had been rejected) on whose scholars Nikon had relied already for his reforms. Nikon himself, having proposed to replace the Russian simfonia (the traditional balance of ecclesiastical and secular power) by a more theocratic model, was banned upon his success, effectively shifting the power balance to the Romanov tsars ruling Russia since the end of the Great Smuta (1613). As the see of the metropolitan, Kiev furthermore granted Moscow influence on the Orthodox population in Poland-Lithuania. "Protection" of the Orthodox population thus became a future argument for Romanov influence over eastern Poland-Lithuania.

== Perspectives ==
In Ukraine, the treaty is often viewed as leading to the partition of the Hetmanate state between its more powerful neighboring states.

From the Polish point of view the treaty is considered a significant mistake that tipped the balance of power in the region and replaced Poland as the dominant state of Eastern Europe by the emerging Russian Empire.

== See also ==
- Khmelnytsky Uprising
- The Ruin (Ukrainian history)#List of Treaties
