= Grigory Romodanovsky =

Russian general

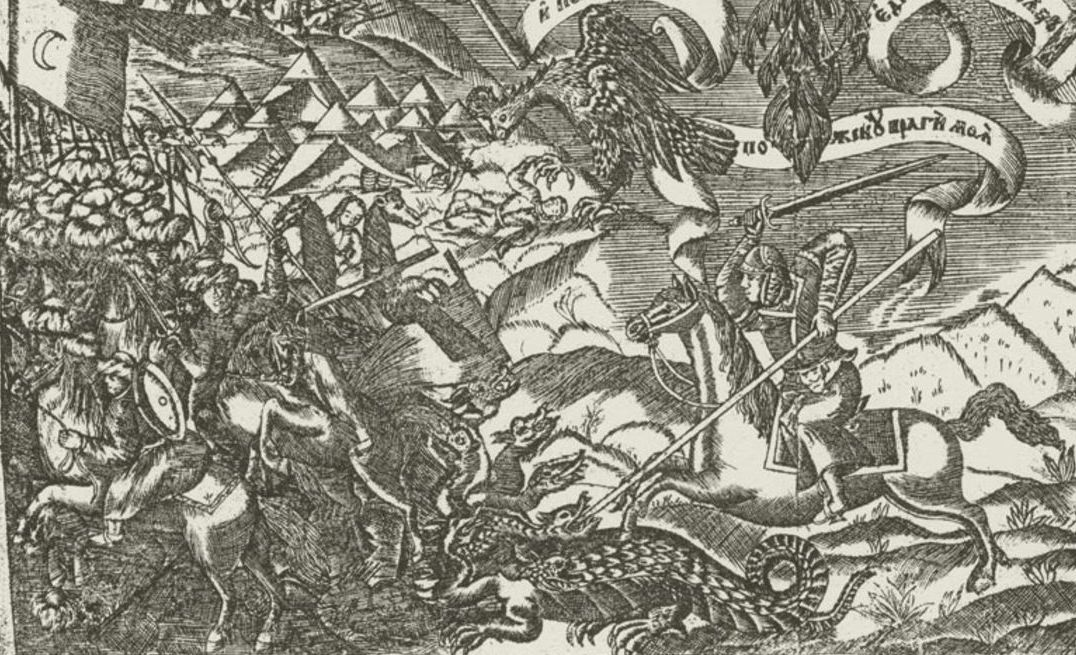
Gregory (the horseman) pursues the retreating Turks near Chyhyryn

Grigory Grigoryevich Romodanovsky (Russian: Григорий Григорьевич Ромодановский) was a controversial figure of the Russian foreign policy as a member of the Razryadny Prikaz, playing a key role in pursuing leaders of the Ukrainian Cossack officers into the union with the Muscovy state. During the Russo-Polish war, he was a leading Russian general of Tsar Alexis's reign who promoted the Tsar's interests in Ukraine.

== Biography ==
Romodanovsky belonged to the Rurikid clan of Romodanovsky. He took part in the Pereyaslav Rada of 1654 and led his Streltsy against the Poles during Russo-Polish War (1654–1667), winning the Battle of Kaniv (1662) in this conflict. On 9 May 1656, after being appointed as Okolnichiy, Romodanovsky was also appointed the Voivode of Belgorod Razryad created in the Sloboda Ukraine. In 1659 while assisting the Prince Alexei Trubetskoi in his expedition against Ivan Vyhovsky suffered notable defeat at the battle of Konotop after number of easy victories in the same region. (Note: see Battle of Konotop) During the 1660s and 1670s, he was instrumental in spreading Muscovite influence in the Cossack Hetmanate, sometimes openly interfering into election of the Hetman of Zaporizhian Host and promoting the candidates backed up by Moscow. In 1670 along with Cossacks of Demian Mnohohrishny successfully defended against insurgents of Stepan Razin.

Romodanovsky was in charge of the Russian army during the Russo-Turkish War (1676–1681), but his rivalry with a cousin, Prince Vasily Galitzine, stymied his later career. Prince Grigory Romodanovsky was killed by the mob during the Moscow Uprising of 1682.
