= Left-bank Ukraine =

Historic region in Ukraine

Coordinates: 51°N 33°E

Left-bank Ukraine Лівобережна Україна
- Historical region
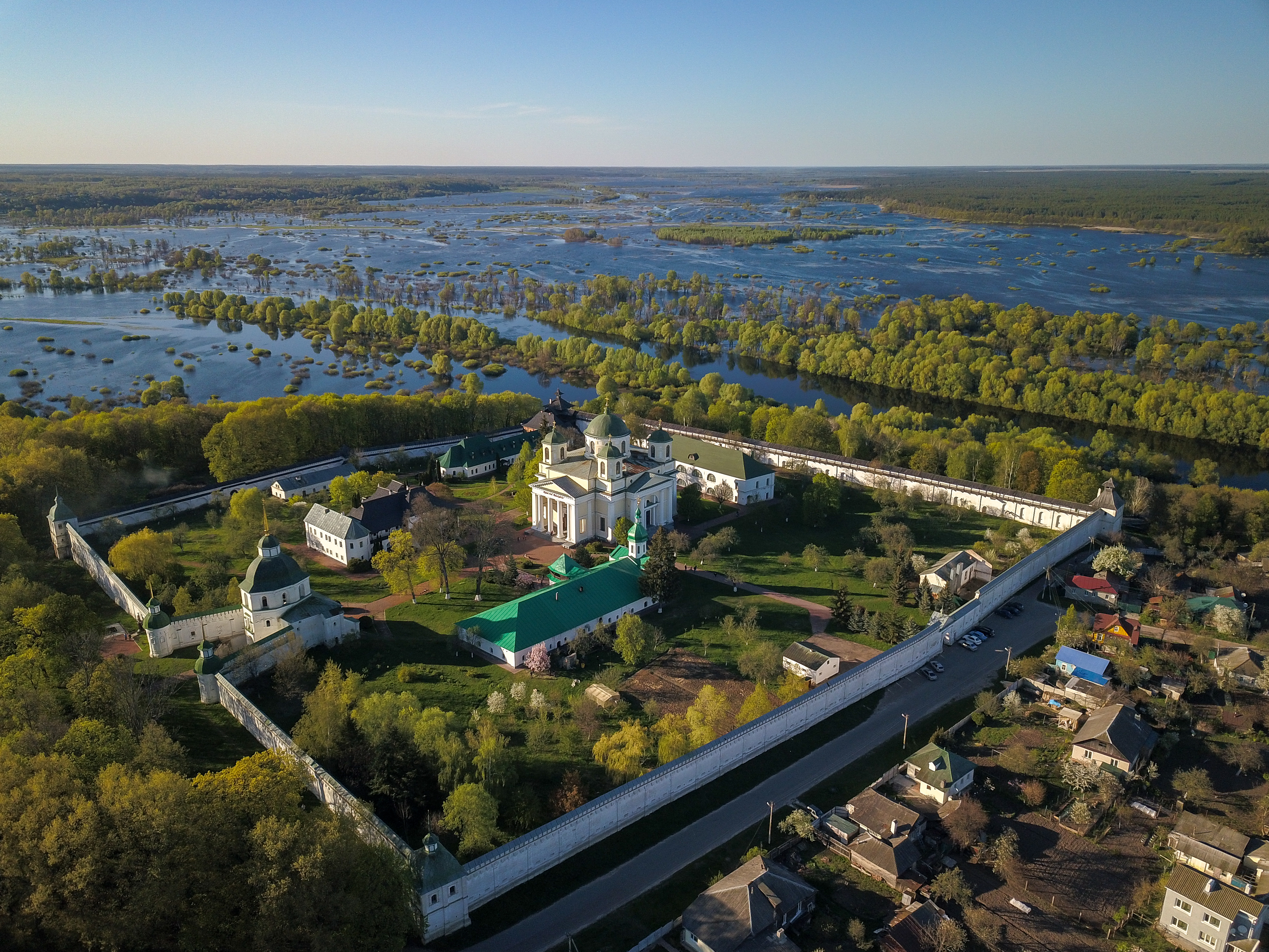
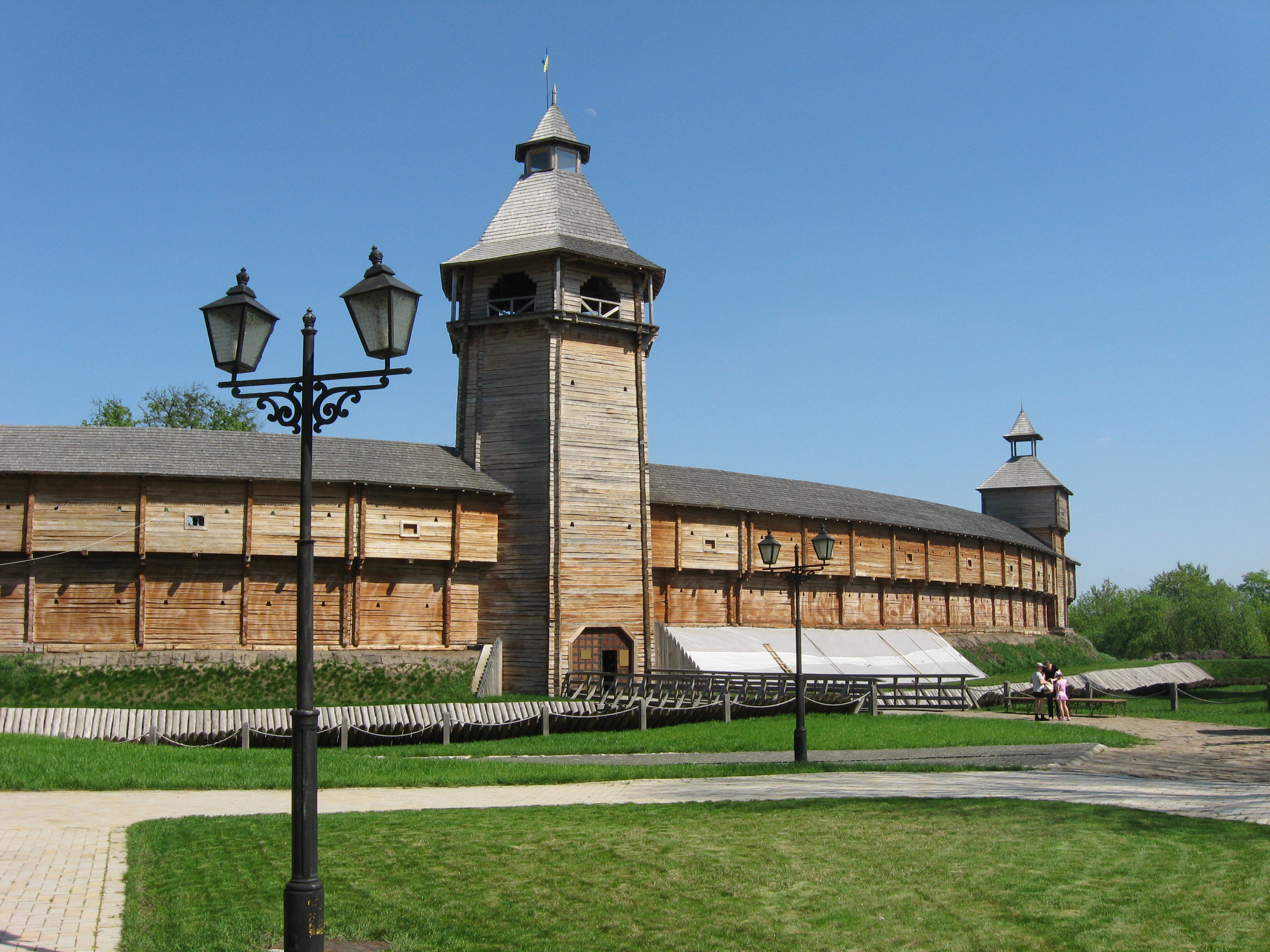
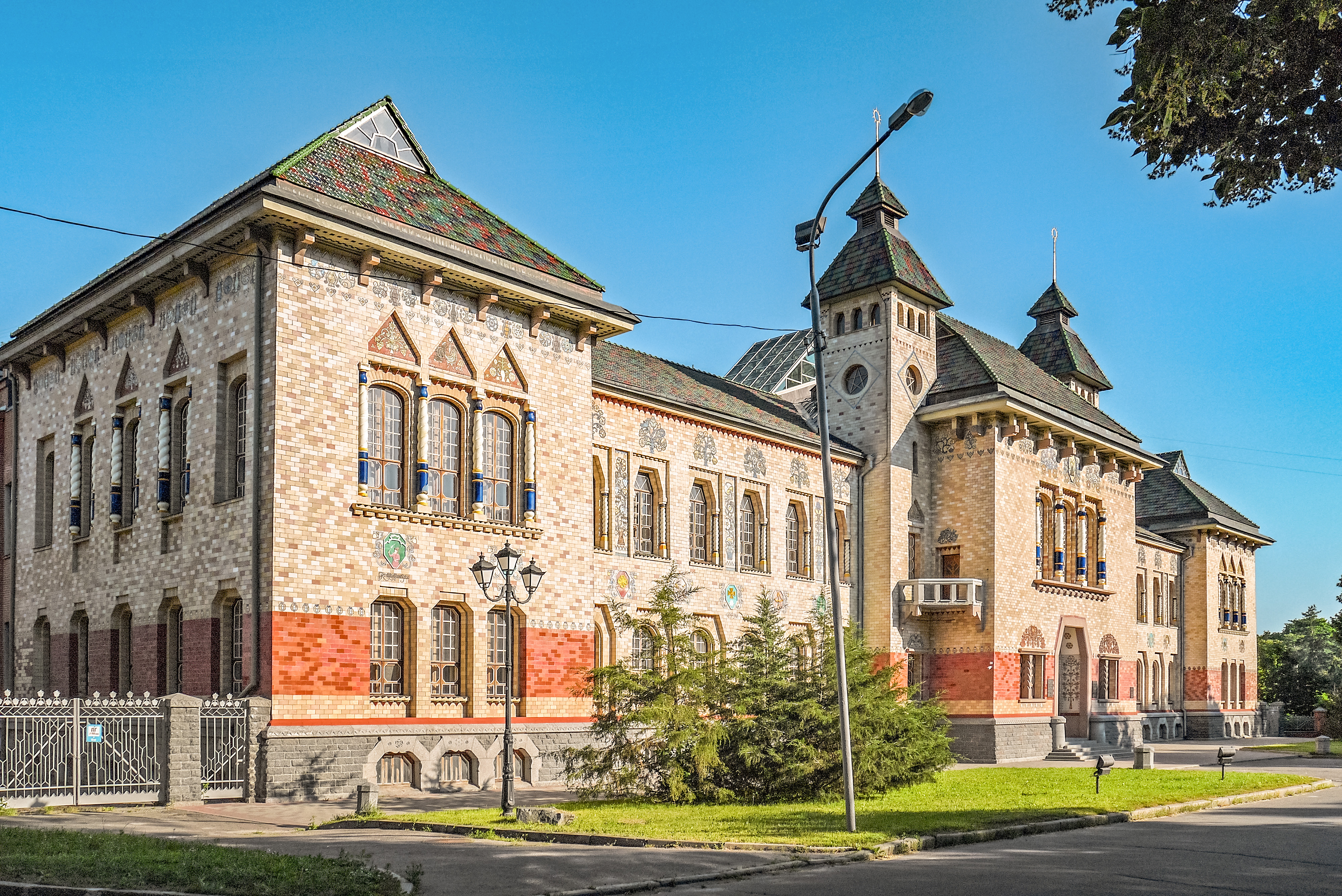
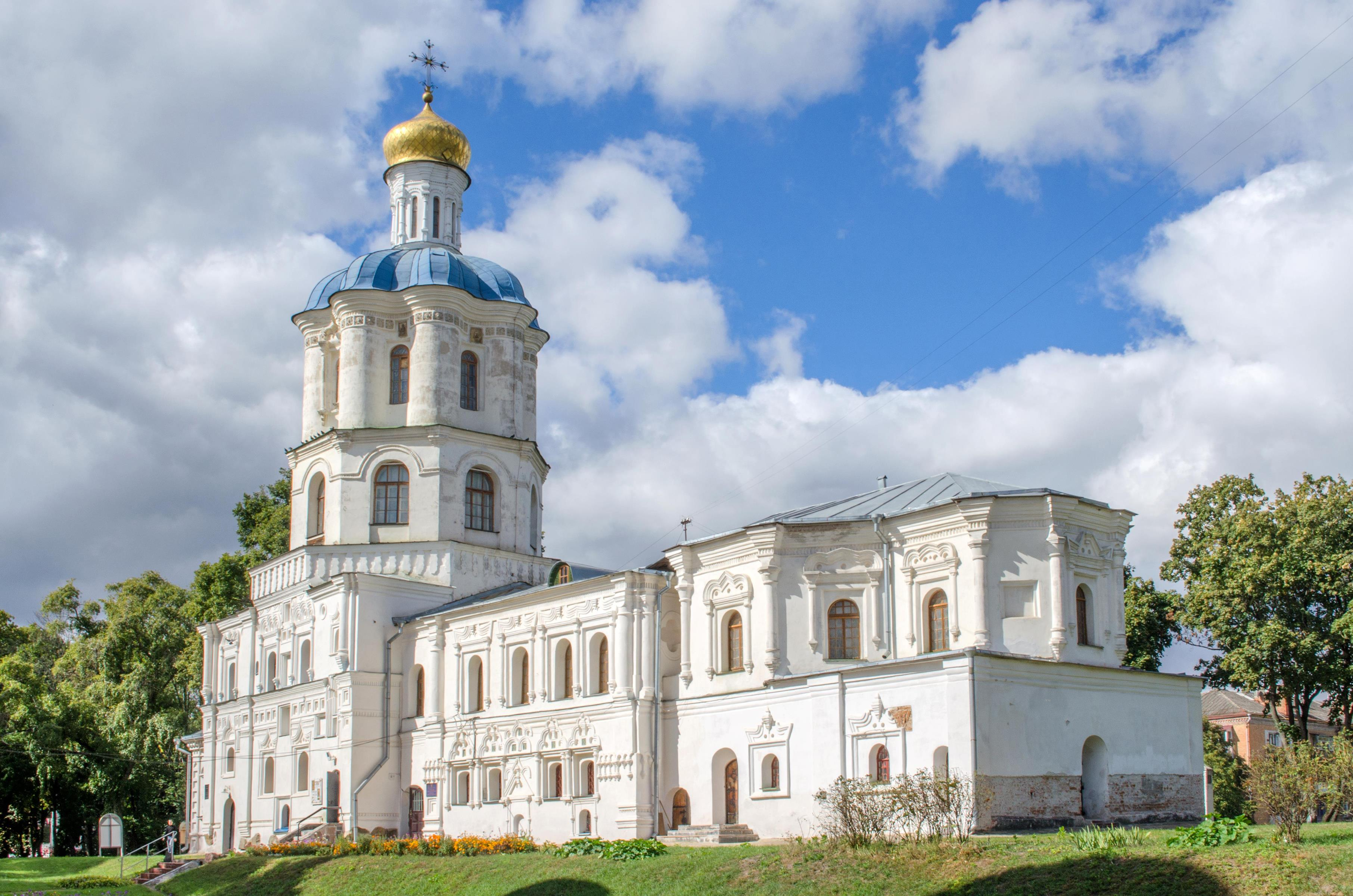
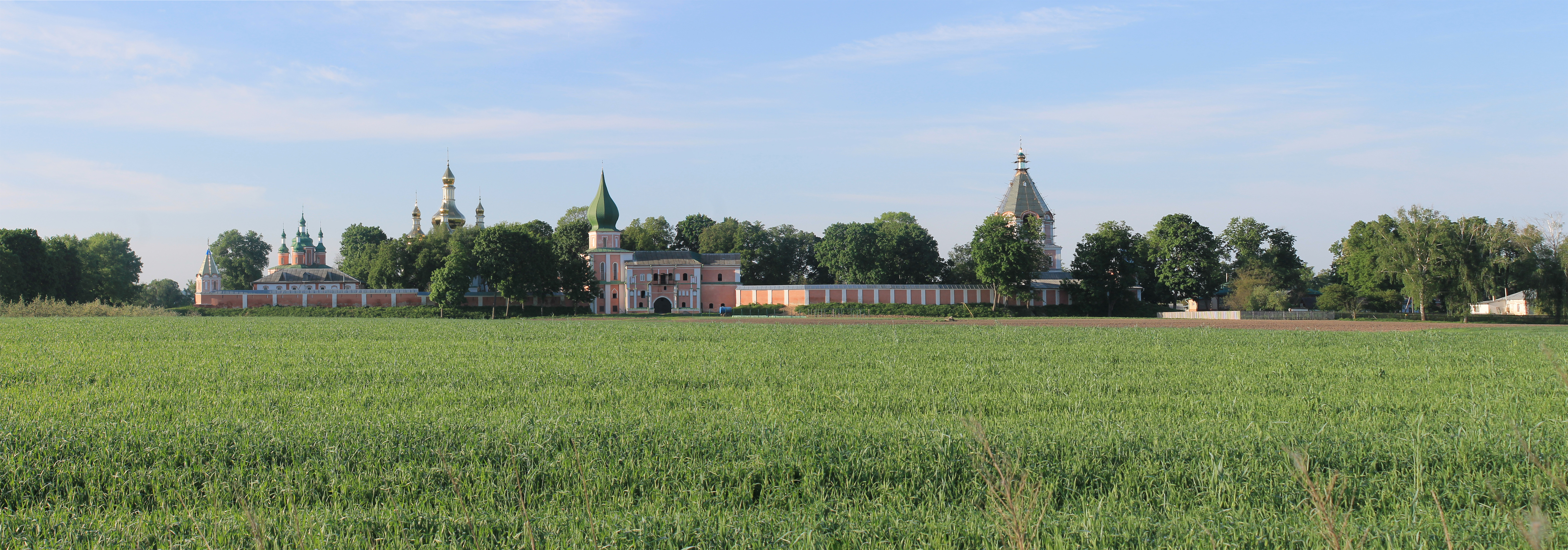
- Transfiguration Monastery in Novhorod-Siverskyi Baturyn Fortress Citadel Poltava Governorate Zemstvo Building Chernihiv Collegium Hustynia Monastery

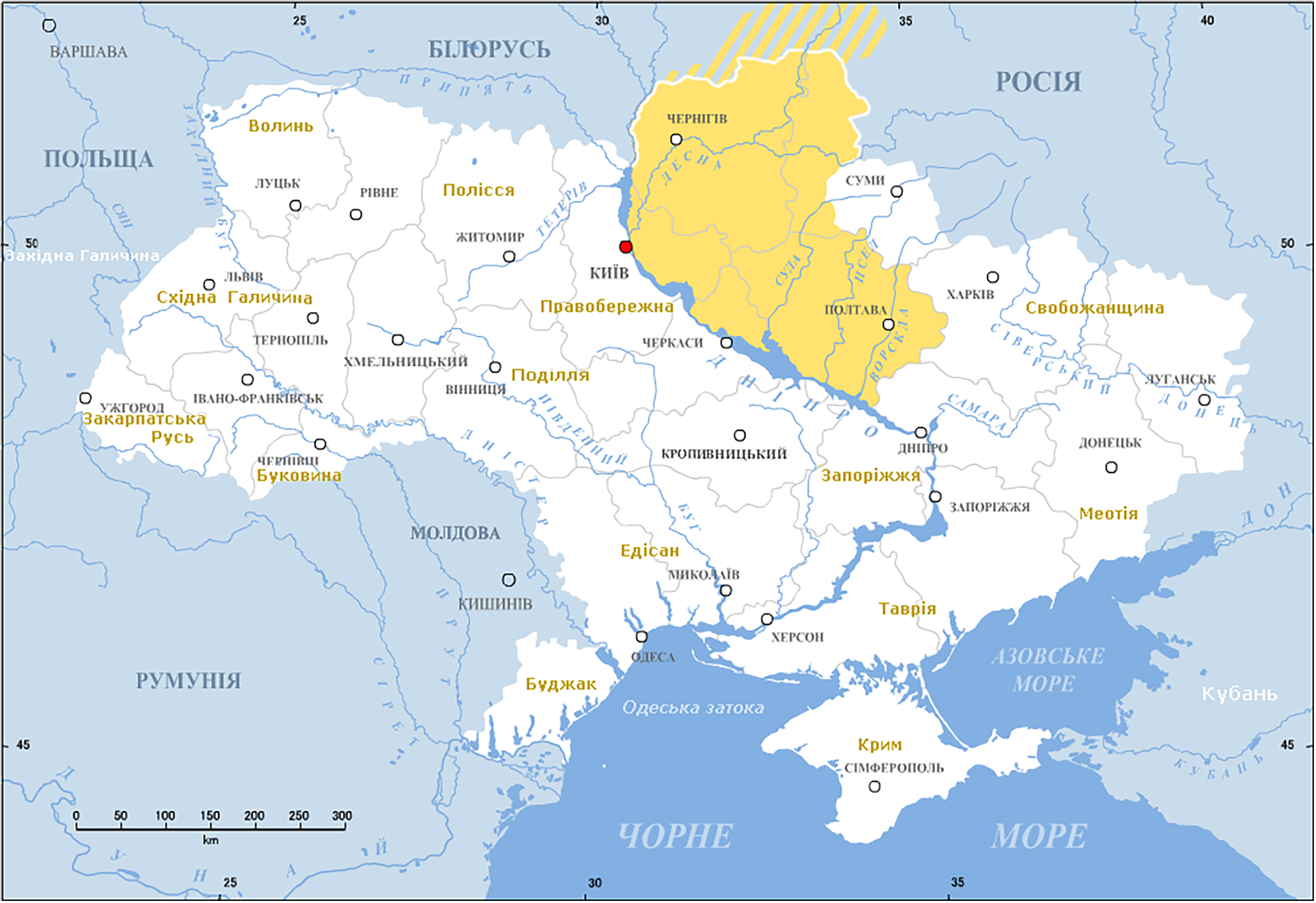
- Location on the map of Ukraine
- Country: Ukraine
- Largest city: Kyiv
- Time zone: UTC+2 (EET)
  - Summer (DST): UTC+3 (EEST)

The Left-bank Ukraine, (Note: Ukrainian: Лівобережна Україна, romanized: Livoberezhna Ukrayina; Russian: Левобережная Украина, romanized: Levoberezhnaya Ukraina; Polish: Lewobrzeżna Ukraina) also known as Livoberezhzhia, (Note: Ukrainian: Лівобережжя, Ukrainian pronunciation: [lʲiwobeˈrɛʒʲːɐ]) is a historic region in north-central and central Ukraine. It is located on the left (east) bank of the Dnieper River, comprising the modern-day oblasts of Chernihiv and Poltava, as well as the eastern parts of Kyiv and Cherkasy, and the western part of Sumy.

Left-bank Ukraine is bordered by the historical regions of Right-bank Ukraine to the southwest, Zaporizhzhia to the southeast, Sloboda Ukraine to the east, and Polesia and White Ruthenia to the north.

Largest cities are Kyiv (eastern part), Chernihiv, Poltava and Kremenchuk.

== History ==
Since the Middle Ages, the region formed part of the Khazar Khanate, Kievan Rus', Mongol Empire, Golden Horde, Grand Duchy of Lithuania and the Kingdom of Poland.

Up until the mid-17th century, the area had belonged to the Polish–Lithuanian Commonwealth. During the period of Polish rule, the region of modern-day Left-bank Ukraine was known as Zadniprovia ("Trans-Dnieper") and was centered around Lubny, the residence of the Wiśniowiecki family, which was acquired by Aleksander Wiśniowiecki from Cherkasy nobleman Mykhailo Baybuza in 1589.

By the 1640s, Aleksander's grandson Yarema controlled over 50 cities and towns in the area, and mass settlement increased the local population to around 250,000 people. During that period, the discovery of saltpeter sources near Myrhorod, Khorol and Hadiach led to a conflict as a result of the crown's attempt to realize its monopoly on those goods. During the Khmelnytsky Uprising, in summer 1648 Wiśniowiecki lost his possessions to the rebels, and they were incorporated by the Cossack Hetmanate.

The Treaty of Pereyaslav of 1654 saw the region tentatively come under Russian control, when local Cossack leaders swore allegiance to the Russian monarchy in exchange for military protection. The term "Left-bank Ukraine" appeared in 1663 with the election of Ivan Bryukhovetsky as the hetman of Ukraine in opposition to Pavlo Teteria, designating the area which remained under Russian influence. Russian sovereignty over the area was later reaffirmed in the Treaty of Andrusovo (1667), and the Eternal Peace Treaty (1686) between the Polish–Lithuanian Commonwealth and Tsardom of Russia.

Under Russian rule, the left-bank Ukraine initially enjoyed a degree of autonomy within the Tsardom (from 1721, Imperial Russia) as the Cossack Hetmanate, which was slowly withdrawn throughout the eighteenth century when the Zaporizhian Sich was destroyed.

== See also ==
- Right-bank Ukraine
- Dnieper Lowland
