= Right-bank uprising (1664–1665) =

Right-Bank Uprising
- Part of Russo-Polish War (1654–1667) and The Ruin
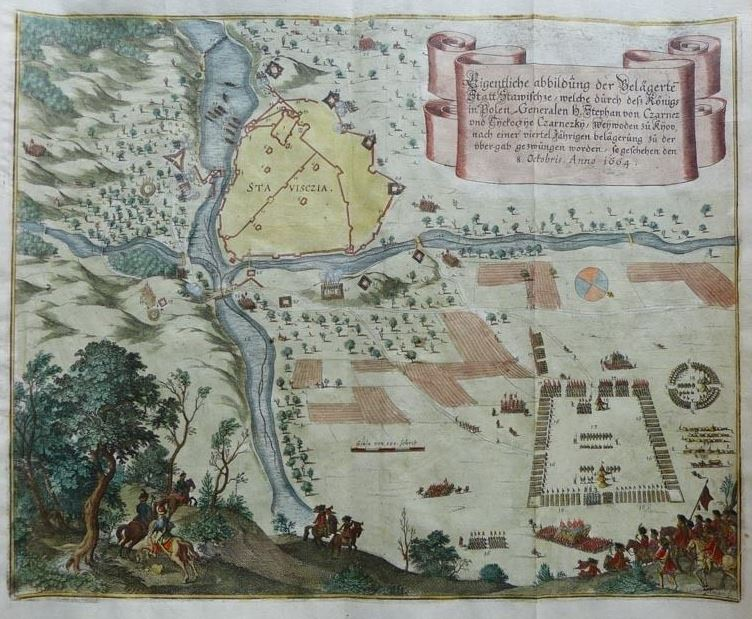
- The Polish siege of the fortress Stavishche in Little Russia 1664
Date	January 1664–1665
Location	Right-Bank Ukraine
Result	See § Aftermath

Belligerents
Right-Bank rebels 1664: Left-Bank Hetmanate; Zaporozhian Sich; Don Cossacks; Tsardom of Russia; Kalmyk Khanate	Polish-Lithuanian Commonwealth; Crimean Khanate; Right-Bank Hetmanate (surrendered)

Commanders and leaders
Local leaders 1664: (Cossack Hetmanate) Ivan Briukhovetsky (Cossack Hetmanate) Andrei Bogomaz; Ivan Sirko (Tsardom of Russia) Grigory Romodanovsky (Tsardom of Russia) Grigory Kosagov (Tsardom of Russia) Pyotr Skuratov	Stefan Czarniecki (DOW); John III Sobieski; Sebastian Machowski; Wacław Leszczyński; Mehmed IV Giray; Khan-Mambet Shirin; Pavlo Teteria; Ivan Vyhovsky (executed) (Note: Executed by Polish authorities)

Strength
20,000	22,000–25,000; 10,000–15,000; Unknown

Casualties and losses
Heavy combat losses; 1,500 executed	9,000+ killed
- See Casualties: Massacres and repressions

The Right-Bank Uprising was initiated by Right-Bank peasantry, supported by Cossack-Russian troops against Right-Bank Hetman Pavlo Teteria and Poland-Lithuania in January 1664–1665.

== Prelude ==
Right-Bank peasantry was dissatisfied by the attempts of Pavlo Teteria and Jan II Casimir to restore the privileges of szlachta, which would bring back the situation in Right-Bank Ukraine to before the Khmelnytsky Uprising. After Poland-Lithuania suffered a major defeat during Siege of Hlukhiv, Right-Bank peasants were inspired by this and intensified an uprising in the Right-Bank. Ivan Sirko was an external instigator of this uprising.

== Uprising ==
=== First phase ===
The Uprising began in January 1664. Cossack-Russian troops entered Right-Bank to assist the rebels in their uprising on February, but they had a decentralized leadership structure, their leaders were operating independently. Ivan Sirko captured Bratslav and Uman. The uprising spread to all of Right-Bank. Despite the difficulty of situation, Pavlo Teteria and Ivan Vyhovsky remained loyal to the Polish King, trying to hold Chyhyryn and Bila Tserkva. On March 27, Vyhovsky was accused of collaborating with rebels and was executed by the Polish authorities. 1,500 captured rebels were executed, but this only further provoked the rebels and intensified the uprising even further. Sirko defeated Polish-Cossack forces in Chyhyryn and seized Teteria's treasure after capturing the city. On April, as the rebels were capturing more cities, Teteria and Polish troops retreated to Poland, surrendering Right-Bank to the rebels.

=== Second phase ===
Stefan Czarniecki arrived with his 22,000–25,000 troops and 10,000–15,000 Tatars. On April 7, Czarniecki with his 2,000 troops attacked Ivan Sirko and Grigory Kosagov who led 390 troops, but his attack was repelled. During April 7-13, Czerniecki besieged Buzhin, but was again repelled.

Throughout May, Polish-led forces launched several assaults near Kaniv. On May 21, Polish forces attacked the convoys of the Cossack-Russian army led by Ivan Bryukhovetsky and Pyotr Skuratov, but were repelled. On May 22, the Polish-Cossack-Crimean army led by Stefan Czarnecki, John III Sobieski and Pavlo Teteria attacked the Cossack-Russian forces of Skuratov and Bryukhovetsky, but were again repelled. On May 29, Czarnecki's army unsuccessfully attacked Russian forces. In these failed assaults, Polish-led forces suffered 6,000 killed. On June 1, temporary ceasefire was signed. Despite these successes, it was no longer possible to occupy Right-Bank after arrival of Polish reinforcements, Cossack-Russian forces were going through withdrawal while being forced to fight battles in process.

On July, Zaporozhian Cossacks and Kalmyks led by Ataman Sirko plundered several Tatar settlements in the lands of Budjak Horde, then proceeded to return with loot, passing near Saradzhin. Battle in the Sarajinsky Forest in 1664. The Crimean Tatars under Khan-Mambet Shirin and the Polish detachments of W. Leszczyński and S. Machowski (3-4 thousand men), having learned about the advance of the Zaporizhian-Kalmyk detachment under Ivan Sirko (2,500 Zaporizhians and 300 Kalmyks), set up an ambush against them. Sirko later withdrew from Right-Bank Ukraine to take part in campaigns against the Crimean Khanate.

On July 7, Czarniecki besieged Stavishche, defeating Right-Bank rebels and Briukhovetsky's Cossacks. On October 21, Stefan Czarnecki and Pavlo Teteria besieged the Kosagov's forces in Medvedovka and assaulted it for 4 weeks. In November, the siege of Medvedovka was lifted and the Cossack-Russian forces retreated. On December 12, near Starobor, Kosagov's forces defeated Polish-Cossack forces. At the end of December, Andrei Bogomaz's Cossacks recaptured Uman and freed Russian prisoners. Afterwards, Cossack-Russian forces fully withdrew from Right-Bank Ukraine. In January 1665, Right-Bank rebels made their last attempt to resist Polish rule, revolting in Stavyshche and taking it over. Despite their effort, Stefan Czarniecki eventually suppressed the revolt. However, he was unable to recover from the wounds he received at Lysianka.

== Massacres and repressions ==
Right-Bank rebels massacred Poles and Jews during the uprising. According to Stefan Czarniecki, his forces massacred 100,000 civilians. Crimean Tatars took civilians captive, but were unable to take them to Crimea due to Sirko's Cossacks blocking the paths there, which also prevented the arrival of Tatar reinforcements.

== Aftermath ==
The uprising resulted in temporary victory for Cossack-Russian forces. Polish-Lithuanian influence was shattered. But despite this, Stefan Czarniecki managed to suppress the uprising and oust the Zaporozhians. Tatar forces were largely defeated, leaving Right-Bank without captives. Poland-Lithuania resumed negotiations process with Tsardom of Russia. The instability caused by uprising undermined Pavlo Teteria's position as Hetman and he was replaced by Petro Doroshenko, which created the basis for rapture of Right-Bank in the coming years.

The uprising didn't succeed in reunifying the Cossack Hetmanate and making Polish-Lithuanian authorities abandon their claims to the Right-Bank. Nonetheless, Ivan Sirko could feel somewhat satisfied with the result of his uprising, as it succeeded in crippling the Polish-Lithuanian army and undermining their influence over the Right-Bank, also leading to Polish-Lithuanian defeats in Left-Bank.

== Bibliography ==
- Апанович, О. М. (1961). Запорізька Січ у боротьбі проти турецько-татарської агресії (in Ukrainian). Kyiv: Вид-во АН УРСР.
- Draganenko, V. P. (2021). "ДЖЕРЕЛА ВІЙСЬКОВИХ ПОДІЙ НА СХІДНОМУ ПОДІЛЛІ 1664 РОКУ" [SOURCES OF MILITARY EVENTS IN EASTERN PODILLA IN 1664] (PDF) (in Ukrainian). Kyiv: Київська наукова суспільнознавча організація.
