= Sebastian Machowski =

Polish nobleman and military leader (died 1672)

- Coat of arms of Machowski family
- Born: c. 1600
- Died: 1672
- Military career
- Allegiance: Polish–Lithuanian Commonwealth
- Rank: Colonel; Regimentarz
- Conflicts: See list: Raid on Romny (1644); Deluge (history); Battle of Gołąb; Battle of Warka; Khmelnytsky Uprising; Siege of Suceava (1653); Polish–Russian War (1654–1667); Battle of Chudnov; Right-bank uprising (1664-1665); Battle of Saradzhin (1664); Polish–Cossack–Tatar War (1666–1671); Battle of Brailov (1666) (POW)

Sebastian Machowski of the Abdank coat of arms (died 1672) was a Polish nobleman and a military leader who served as a regimentarz and a colonel in the Commonwealth army.

== Biography ==
Machowski was born in approximately 1600. In 1644 he participated in Jeremi Wiśniowiecki's raid on Romny. In 1648, his presence in Chernihiv Voivodeship is mentioned.

During the Deluge, he participated in the battles with the Swedes at Gołąb and Warka and in the battle near Chudniv against the Russians and the Cossacks. During the Right-bank uprising, he was one of the leaders of Polish forces in Ukraine along with Stefan Czarniecki and Wacław Leszczyński. Particularly, he is known for organising an ambush on the Cossack-Kalmyk army of Ivan Sirko, defeating the Cossack rebels near Bila Tserkva and Rokytne, and, most famously, executing Ivan Vyhovsky. In the end of 1666, Machowski's unit entered the Right-bank Ukraine in order to seize this region. On December 19, his unit got attacked by the Tatars and the Cossacks of hetman Petro Doroshenko. After a two hours-long battle, Machowski was defeated, taken prisoner and sent to Crimea.

Machowski died in 1672 at the age of approximately 72.
