= Siege of Buzhyn =

1664 event in the Right-Bank Uprising

- Part of the Right-Bank Uprising (1664–1665)
Date	7–13 April 1664
Location	Buzhyn, Right-Bank Ukraine
Result	Cossack–Russian victory

Belligerents
Left-Bank Cossacks; Zaporozhian Sich; Tsardom of Russia	Polish-Lithuanian Commonwealth; Crimean Khanate; Right-Bank Cossacks

Commanders and leaders
(Cossack Hetmanate) Ivan Briukhovetsky; Ivan Sirko (Tsardom of Russia) Grigory Kosagov	Stefan Czarniecki; Mehmed IV Giray; Pavlo Teteria

Strength
Unknown	2,000+

Casualties and losses
Unknown	Heavy

The siege of Buzhyn was conducted by the Polish-Lithuanian-Crimean forces against the Cossack-Russian garrison of Buzhyn, from 7 to 13 April 1664.

== Prelude ==
The residents of Chyhyryn rose up in support of pro-Polish Teteria. Briukhovetsky besieged Chyhyryn for several weeks, but retreated after the news of Teteria and Tatars coming to the aid of Chyhyryn residents. Bryukhovetsky joined Ivan Sirko at Buzhyn. Kosagov and Sirko replenished their losses and again operated in the Right-Bank, attracting the local population to their side. However, Kosagov wanted to avoid direct confrontation with Czarniecki and spent the entire April avoiding Czarniecki's army in various fortresses. Kosagov and Sirko were stationed in Buzhyn at that time.

== Siege ==
On 7 April, Teteria and his Tatar allies conducted skirmishes with the Buzhyn garrison until Czarniecki is going arrive. Bryukhovetsky learned about this from captives, so he headed to up the Dnieper to Kaniv itself, which was under his command, for the defensive maneuver. Czarniecki took Korsun and besieged Kaniv, but was repulsed. Czarniecki gathered 2,000-strong Polish-Tatar cavalry to besiege Bruzhin. However, Sirko pulled off a decisive maneuver, breaking out of encirclement and killing many Polish-Tatar troops in process. On 13 April, Czarniecki was forced to lift the siege and retreat with his army.

== Aftermath ==
Polish-Tatar forces suffered heavy losses and all their attacks were repulsed. Czarniecki suffered a military defeat and only captured Buzhyn after withdrawal of Kosagov and Sirko. Czarniecki captured Subotov, in anger he dug up the grave of Bohdan Khmelnytsky and his son Tymosh to burn them down on the square, taking revenge for his defeat.
