= Valuyki =

Valuyki (Russian: Валуйки) is the name of several inhabited localities in Russia.

== Urban localities ==
- Valuyki, Belgorod Oblast, a town in Belgorod Oblast

== Rural localities ==
- Valuyki, Moscow Oblast, a village in Teryayevskoye Rural Settlement of Volokolamsky District of Moscow Oblast
- Valuyki, Tver Oblast, a village in Staritsky District of Tver Oblast
