= Samiilo Bohdanovych-Zarudny =

Ukrainian diplomat and judge

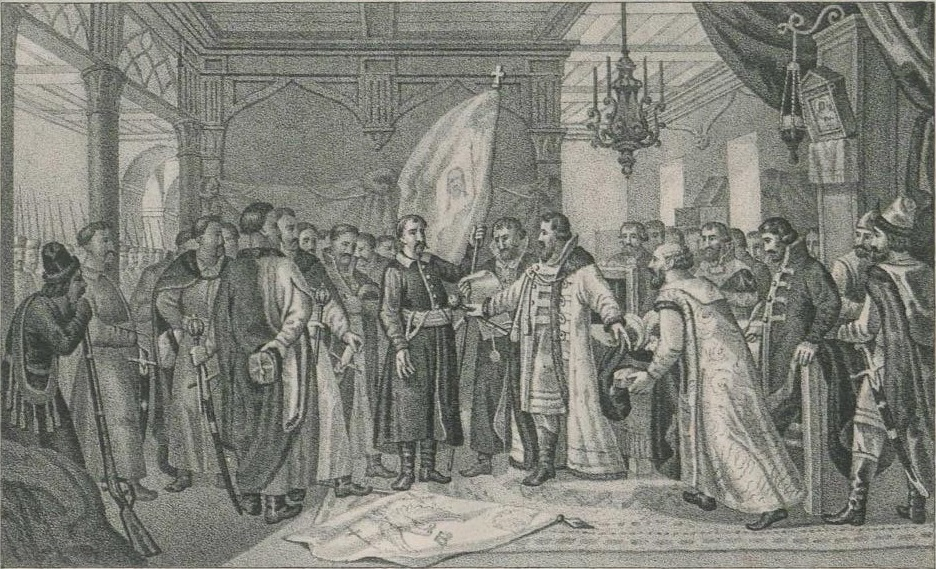
Boyar Buturlin receiving an oath of loyalty to the Russian Tsar from Bogdan Khmelnitsky

Samiilo Bohdanovych-Zarudny (Ukrainian: Самійло Богданович-Зарудний; Polish: Samuel Zarudny Bogdanowicz) was a Ukrainian Cossack diplomat, noble and general judge of the Zaporozhian Host, who defected to Bohdan Khmelnytsky's side at Korsun-Shevchenkivskyi in 1648.

Bohdanovych-Zarudny played key roles in the Treaty of Pereyaslav (Pereiaslav Treaty) of 1654 which began when he along with Pavlo Teteria conducted negotiations in Warsaw in 1650, and subsequently headed the Cossack delegations to Moscow (1652 and again in 1654) and Turkey (1653). In 1657 Bohdanovych-Zarudny traveled to Transylvania to once again initiate negotiations towards another treaty. This eventually led to the 1658 signing, with Poland, of the Treaty of Hadiach (Hadiache).

Following the decline of Ivan Vyhovsky, Bohdanovych-Zarudny joined Yurii Khmelnytsky where he participated in drafting the Treaty of Slobodyshche.

In 1664, Bohdanovych-Zarudny fought, alongside the Polish, against Ivan Briukhovetsky who eventually signed the Moscow Articles of 1665, effectively placing Ukraine under the direct rule of the Tsar, and thereby ending Ukraine's independence and autonomy.
