= Battle of Stavyshche =

1664-1665 battle of the Russo-Polish War (1654–67)

- Part of Russo-Polish War (1654–1667); Right-bank uprising (1664–1665)
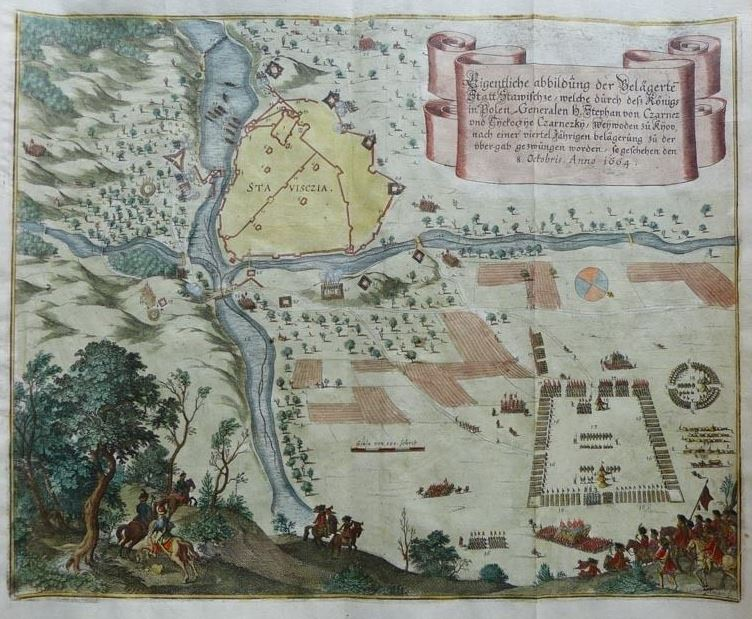
| Date | July – October 1664, January 1665 |
| Location | Stawiszcze (Stavyshche), Polish–Lithuanian Commonwealth |
| Result | Polish–Lithuanian–Crimean victory |

Belligerents
| Polish–Lithuanian Commonwealth; Crimean Khanate | Local militia Zaporozhian Cossacks |

Commanders and leaders
| Stefan Czarniecki | Colonel Dyachko †; Colonel Bulganin † |

Casualties and losses
| Heavy | Heavy |
- Around 100,000 Ukrainian civilians killed (See Capitulation)

The Battle of Stavyshche (Polish: Bitwa pod Stawiszczami), also called the Siege of Stawiszcze, took place between July 7 - October 7, 1664, during the Russo-Polish War (1654–67). Polish Crown forces under Stefan Czarniecki besieged the town of Stavyshche (Stawiszcze), which at that time belonged to Polish–Lithuanian Commonwealth's Kiev Voivodeship. The residents of Stavyshche rebelled against Polish rule, and as a result, the town was destroyed in January 1665.

In mid-1664, Polish forces under Czarniecki raided Right-bank Ukraine. At the same time, the town of Stavyshche/Stawiszcze, located near Kiev rebelled against Polish rule (see Treaty of Andrusovo). Its siege began on July 7, and lasted four months, after which the defenders surrendered, due to hunger and lack of ammunition. Leaders of the rebellion were caught and killed, and the town had to pay a large fine to Polish troops. Soon afterwards, another rebellion began at Stavyshche. This time, Czarniecki ordered to murder all residents, and burn the town to the ground.

== First rebellion ==
The rebellion began in June 1664, and its leaders immediately called Zaporozhian Cossacks commanded by Ivan Briukhovetsky for help. In response, Crown Hetman Stefan Czarniecki ordered 1,000 soldiers to stay at Korsun, in order to check the Cossacks of Briukhovetsky. Main Polish forces headed towards the town, appearing there on July 7.

The defence of Stavyshche was commanded by Cossack Colonels Diachko and Bulganin, and Polish forces were supported by Crimean Tatars, who, with permission of Czarniecki, burned all local villages, capturing their inhabitants. On July 11, Czarniecki ordered general attack. Poles and Tatars managed to get into the town, but immediately the Tatars busied themselves with looting. Cossack defenders took advantage of this and counterattacked, forcing the invaders to retreat.

In late July Poles attacked again, managing to get onto the defensive wall, but their losses were so high that Czarniecki halted the assault. Cossack losses also were extremely high.

After both assaults Czarniecki, whose forces lacked heavy artillery, decided to stop further attacks, and concentrated his efforts on blocking the town. Since main Polish and Tatar forces were concentrated around Stavyshche, Cossack Hetman Ivan Briukhovetsky counterattacked. After initial success, the Cossacks, supported by Russians and Kalmuks, were defeated by fresh forces of the Nogai Horde.

== Capitulation ==
The situation of the besieged town was desperate. Furthermore, in late summer 1664, Stefan Czarniecki's soldiers brutally pacified Right-Bank Ukraine. According to Czarniecki, 100,000 Ukrainians were killed. Due to heavy losses the Cossack rebellion lost its momentum. On October 7, the rebels gave up the resistance and pledged loyalty to Polish king. After the capitulation, Cossack leaders were killed by Poles, but upon order of Czarniecki, other residents of Stavyshche were spared. The inhabitants were obliged to financially support two units of Polish Crown army, and Czarniecki ordered the removal of bells at the local Orthodox church.

== Second rebellion ==
In January 1665, another anti-Polish rebellion broke out in Stavyshche. Cossacks killed all Polish soldiers, stationed in the town, and Stefan Czarniecki decided to punish Stavyshche, sending a division, which suppressed the revolt.

== Sources ==
- Antoine III de Gramont, The history of Muscovite campaign of John II Casimir, Tartu, 1929.
- Yavornytsky D.I., Historia kozaków zaporoskich, T. II, 1990
