= Yanenko =

Yanenko (Cyrillic: Яненко) is a Ukrainian gender-neutral surname that may refer to the following notable people:

- Efrosinia Yanenko-Khmelnytska (died 1684), ancient First Lady of Ukraine
- Nikolai Yanenko (1921–1984), Soviet mathematician
