= Vera Gedroits =

Russian surgeon, writer and princess (1870–1932)

- Вера Гедройц
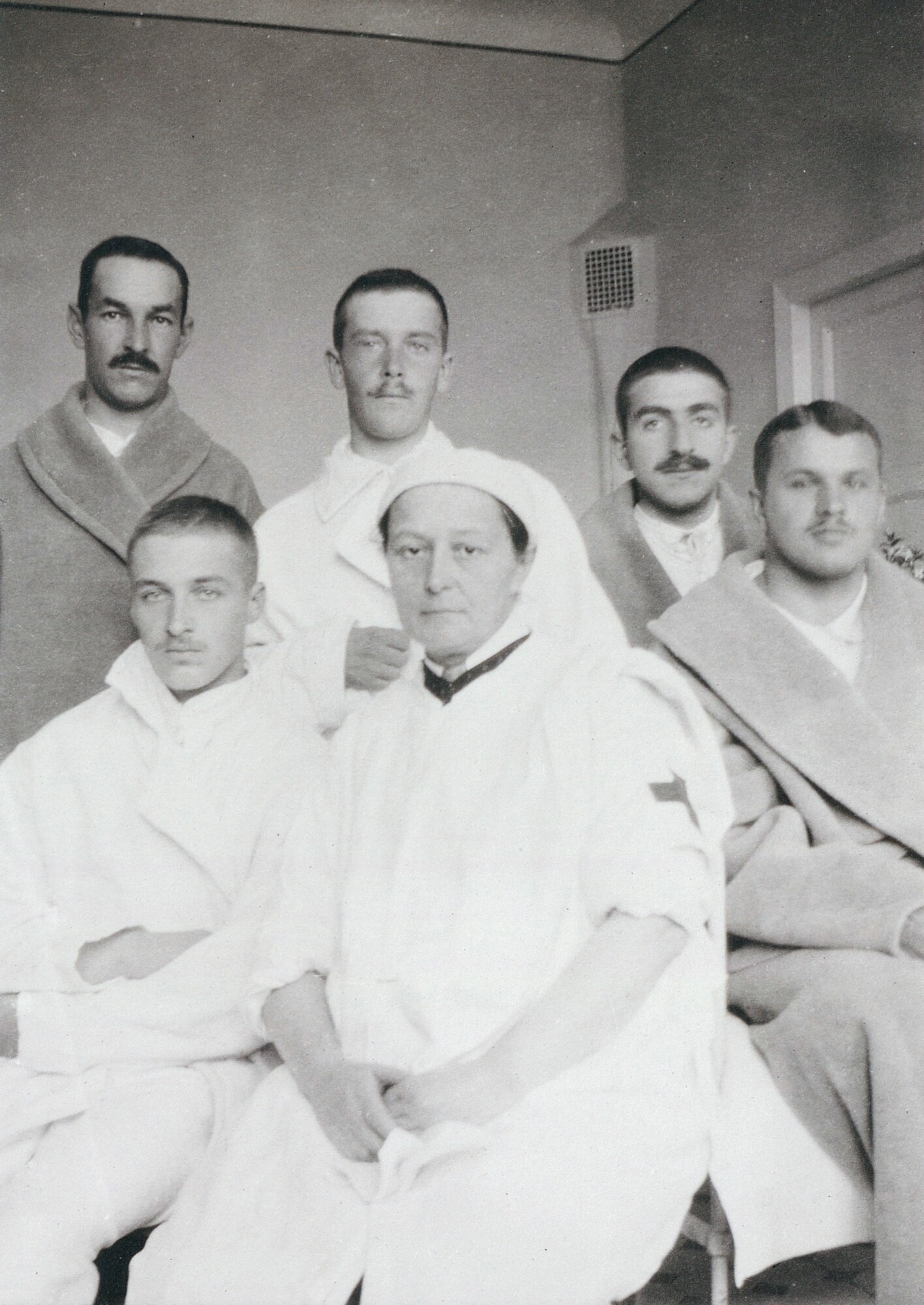
- Gedroits with patients, c. 1915
- Born: Vera Ignatievna Gedroits; 19 April 1870; Slobodishche, Oryol Governorate, Russian Empire
- Died: March 1932 (aged 61); Kiev, Ukrainian SSR, Soviet Union
- Other names: Vera Gedroyts, Vera Gedroitz, Vera Gedröitz, Vera Giedroyć, Vyera Ignat'yevna Gyedroycz
- Occupations: Physician; poet
- Years active: 1900–1932
- Writing career
- Pen name: Sergei Gedroits

Princess Vera Ignatievna Gedroits (Russian: Ве́ра Игна́тьевна Гедро́йц, romanized: Vera Ignatyevna Gedroyts, IPA: [ˈvʲɛrə ɪɡˈnatʲjɪvnə ɡʲɪˈdrojts]; 19 April [O.S. 7 April] 1870 – March 1932), also known by her pen name Sergei Gedroits, was a Russian doctor of medicine and author. She was the first woman military surgeon in Russia, the first woman professor of surgery, and the first woman to serve as a physician to the Russian imperial court.

Following her involvement in a student movement, Gedroits was unable to complete her studies in Russia, and despite being openly lesbian, entered into a marriage of convenience, which allowed her to obtain a passport in another name and leave the country. In Switzerland, she enrolled in the medical courses of César Roux and graduated in 1898, working as Roux's assistant, but returned to Russia because of illnesses in her family.

As a young physician, Gedroits was concerned at the low standards of hygiene, nutrition and sanitation, and made recommendations to improve conditions. In the Russo-Japanese War, she performed abdominal surgeries against established policy, leading to a change in the way battlefield medicine was performed. Much decorated for her war service, she served as physician to the royal court until the outbreak of World War I, training the Tsarina Alexandra and her daughters as nurses.

At the beginning of the Revolution, Gedroits returned to the battle front. Wounded, she was evacuated to Kiev, where she resumed her work as a physician and academic. In 1921, she was hired to teach pediatric surgery at the Kiev Medical Institute and within two years was appointed a professor of medicine. Soviet purges at that time removed her from office in 1930 and denied her a pension. Gedroits turned her attention to writing autobiographical novels until her death from uterine cancer in 1932.

== Early life ==
Vera Ignatievna Gedroits was born on 7 April 1870 O.S. (Note: Some texts give her place of birth as Kiev and have reported a year of birth of 1876; however, Sosnovskaya notes that according to archival records the information is incorrect. Vilensky states that the changes to her date and place of birth were made to facilitate Gedroits' return to service as a military doctor after the abdication of Tsar Nicholas II.) in Slobodishche, (now in the Bryansk Oblast), in the Oryol Governorate of the Russian Empire. Her parents were Daria Konstantinovna Mikhau (Russian: Дарья Константиновна Михау) and Prince Ignatiy Ignatievich Gedroits (Russian: Игнатий Игнатьевич Гедройц). Her mother's family were Russified Germans and her maternal grandfather served as a captain in the military. Her father's family belonged to a Lithuanian princely clan which shared its origins with the more famous Radziwiłł family. After having taken part in the Polish uprising of 1863, Ignatiy Gedroits fled to Russia when Lithuanian liberties were suspended by the autocracy. Establishing a tobacco plantation in the Non-Black Earth Region, he was later elected head of the Council of Magistrates in the Bryansk District, and in 1878 received confirmation of the title of prince for himself and his heirs.

Gedroits was the middle child among five living siblings, Maria (1861), Ignatius (1864), Nadezhda (1876), and Alexandra (1878). Another brother, Sergei, of whom she was particularly fond, died young and would later inspire her literary pseudonym. Following Sergei's death, she developed an interest in medicine, vowing to become a doctor so that she could help to prevent suffering. The children, like their mother, were raised as Orthodox, but their father remained Catholic. They grew up on the family estate which was destroyed by fire in 1877, forcing them to move to a boarding house where their grandmother Natalia Mikhau taught the children reading, French, music, and dancing. The lively Vera Gedroits became the children's ringleader, often dressing in boys' clothes for convenience.

Gedroits attended at the Bryansk women's gymnasium under Vasily Rozanov for a period but was expelled for mischief aimed at her teachers. Her father arranged with his industrialist friend Sergei Maltsov for her to be introduced to medicine as a factory assistant. Under Maltsov's influence, she was finally readmitted to the gymnasium, matriculating with honors in 1885. She continued her education in St. Petersburg, attending the medical courses of the anatomy professor Peter Lesgaft. While there, Gedroits became involved in the revolutionary youth movement, participating in the populist circle of Victor Alexandrovich Veynshtok. Along with other members of the group, she was arrested in 1892. The police returned her to Slobodishche.

== Years in Switzerland ==
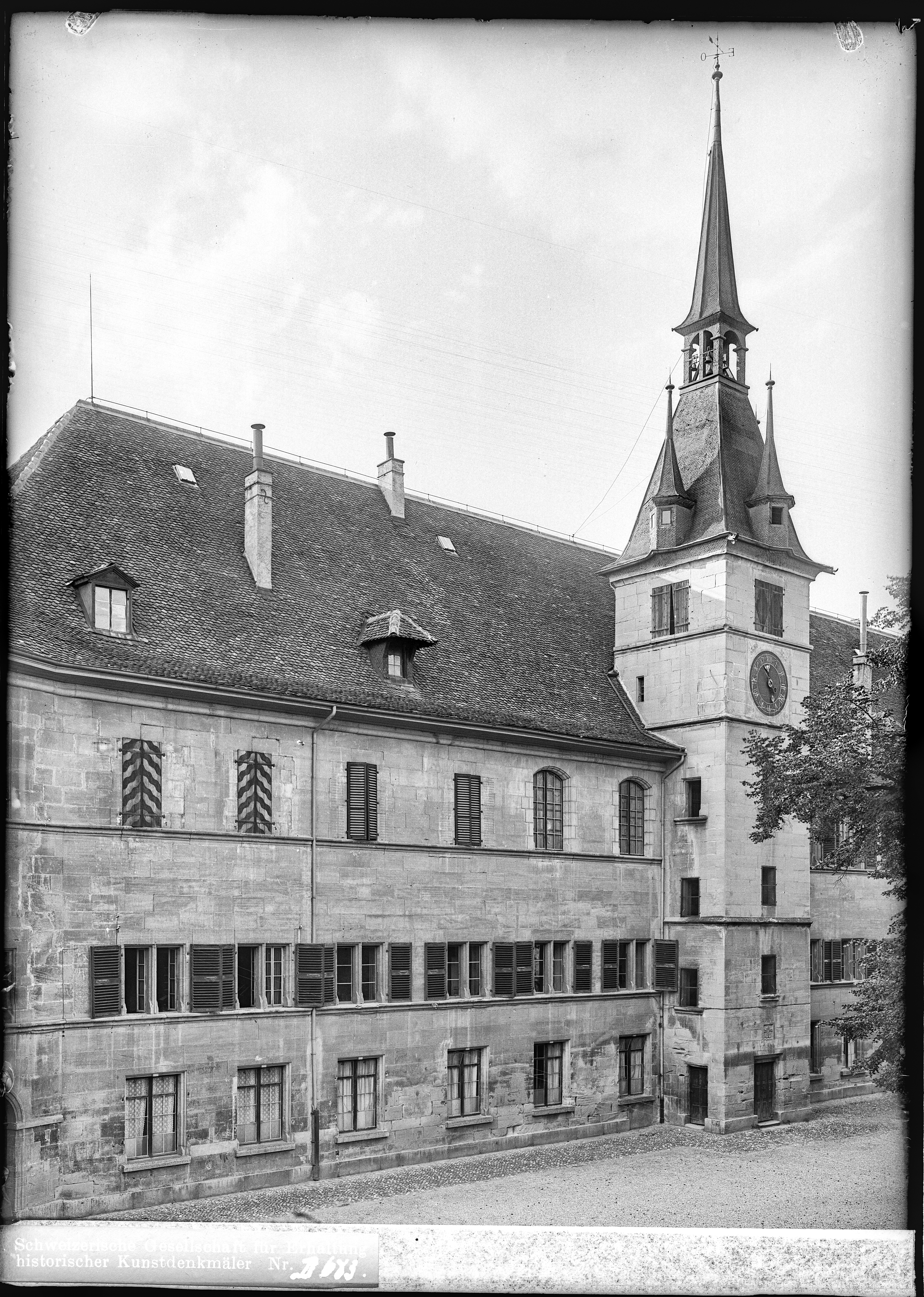
The Swiss University of Lausanne (c. 1899, Swiss National Library, EAD-7270) where Gedroits studied for her diploma as Doctor of Medicine and Surgery

Keen to continue her studies, but unable to do so in Russia, Gedroits arranged a marriage of convenience with a friend from St. Petersburg, Nikolai Belozerov. Although Gedroits was openly lesbian, she and Belozerov actively corresponded, met frequently and traveled together. According to biographer Tatiana Khokhlova, the couple had real affection for each other. They took measures to hide their union, which occurred on 5 September 1894, by living separately. Belozerov's military career took him to Irkutsk in Siberia, while Gedroits used her new name to obtain a passport and slip into Switzerland. She entered the University of Lausanne, where she trained to be a surgeon in the clinic of professor César Roux, graduating in 1898. Earning almost perfect marks, she received her diploma as a Doctor of Medicine and Surgery.

Upon receipt of her diploma, Gedroits first worked as an intern in a therapy clinic, but was soon posted as a junior assistant to Roux. Carrying out scientific studies, she became Roux's senior assistant and he subsequently offered her the post of Privatdozent. Immersing herself in her work, Gedroits wrote that she was "drowning in surgery" in an attempt to comprehend all the subtleties of the procedures and how best to help her patients. She began an ardent lesbian affair, but was forced to return to Russia when she received a pleading letter from her father. He advised that her sister Alexandra had died from tuberculosis and her mother was suffering from nervous exhaustion. He urged her to return and assist him, promising to help her secure work in a new 10-bed factory hospital which was being built. Believing she had a responsibility to her family, she reluctantly returned to Slobodishche in 1900.

== Return to Russia ==
On her return, Gedroits was immediately hired at the Maltsov Cement Factory in the Zhizdrinsky District of the Kaluga Oblast as the plant's physician. Though primarily responsible for the medical needs of the workers and their families, she tended to local villagers as well, as she was the only doctor in the district. By 1901, Gedroits had performed 248 operations with minimal fatalities, including amputations, herniation repair, and setting broken bones, many caused by the difficult working conditions of the laborers. Inadequate safety practices by the factory meant that there was a high risk of industrial accidents and the cement dust caused many eye problems. Poor living conditions with little sanitation, inadequate knowledge of hygiene and nutrition, and no midwifery care contributed to other serious health issues, such as dysentery. Concerned about the overall health of the workers, Gedroits made a list of recommendations for factory administrators, including cleaning the wells, providing washing tubs, and serving hot meals.

In addition to her hospital work, Gedroits published scientific articles in Russian medical journals, which began to be noticed and reprinted in German and French. Invited to participate in the Third Congress of Surgeons in 1902, she presented a report on a surgery performed in 1901 on a male patient suffering from a deformation of the hip joints, which was so severe he could not stand or sit comfortably. Following a complex surgery, within four months the patient was able to walk without crutches. Her detailed report showed a thorough knowledge of surgical work of predecessors in the field, including John Rhea Barton, F. J. Gant, Bernhard von Langenbeck, Jules Germain François Maisonneuve, and Richard von Volkmann.

Wanting to leave the provincial life because of the difficult working conditions, the poverty of the workers, and family issues, Gedroits was required to attain Russian credentials to practice medicine elsewhere in Russia. In spite of her Swiss degree, she had to obtain certifications to meet the requirements of the University of Moscow. In 1902, she asked permission to test for the Latin requirement at the Oryol Gubernatorial Gymnasium. Having been under the watch of the police since her arrest in 1892, she was required to get a statement of character before the examination was allowed. After successfully passing her exams, Gedroits earned the title of female doctor and on 21 February 1903, received her diploma, allowing her to practice medicine throughout the country. The continuing ill-health of her parents, her long working hours, and the collapse of her relationship with her lover from Switzerland, led to a suicide attempt in 1903.

== Russo-Japanese War ==
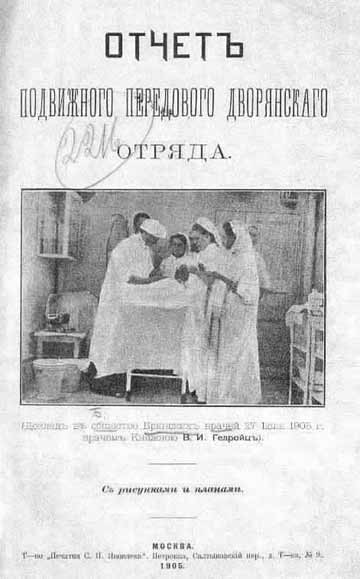
Gedroits' report on her medical work during the Russo-Japanese War, which she presented to the Society of Military Doctors in July 1905

In early 1904, with the outbreak of the Russo-Japanese War, Gedroits volunteered to go to the front with the Red Cross. In the first month of the war, she treated 1,255 patients, including over 100 patients with head wounds and 61 patients with abdominal wounds. Initially treatment was provided in tents covered in an insulating layer of clay, but by January 1905, Gedroits was accompanying the horse-drawn ambulances which brought the wounded to the hospital to perform triage, before entering the operating theater. She was appointed chief surgeon of the hospital train, which consisted of an operating car and five patient cars. The operating car was a specially equipped surgical unit, supplied by the Russian nobility to allow care to the wounded to be performed on the front lines. This put the medical personnel at grave risk, as unless there were wounded personnel in ambulances, tents or surgical trains, their neutrality was not recognized.

Though many Russian, as well as French and British, military surgeons had discarded the idea of treating abdominal wounds, Gedroits recognized that early intervention was key. Standard treatment at the time required the patient to be placed in a semi-reclining position so that the wound could drain. In previous eras, without anesthesia, penetrating abdominal wounds were considered inoperable. Gedroits was the first to perform laparotomies on military patients, having extensive experience in abdominal surgery for hernias, the most frequent surgery she performed in the cement factory hospital. Her procedure required that the patient undergo the operation within three hours of receiving a wound. Her success rate was high, leading to recommendations being made in international medical journals to adopt mobile surgical units which allowed for rapid treatment. The Russian Army and the Russian Society of Military Doctors officially adopted Gedroits' operative procedures.

Designed to treat 2,000 people, the nobles' hospital quickly exceeded its capacity and because it was on the front lines, mortality was high. With the Russian defeat, Gedroits helped organize the hospital evacuation from near the Fushun Mining region, which was performed under gunfire because the Russian troops refused to retreat until the patients were moved. Gedroits was credited with saving the life of Vasily Gurko, as well as that of a Japanese prince. In 1905, she returned to the Maltsov Factory Hospital as chief surgeon and was appointed chief doctor of the Lyudinovskaya Hospital. Compiling a 57-page report on her work during the war, which included illustrations, she presented her results on 27 July 1905 to the Society of Military Doctors. She was awarded the gold medal of diligence from the Order of Saint Anna by the army commander for her actions during the Battle of Mukden, the Ribbon of Saint George with the silver medal "For Bravery" (ru) by General N. Plinevich for her treatment of the wounded, the three highest distinctions from the Russian Red Cross, and recognition by the Imperial family in the form of the silver neck medal of the Order of Saint Vladimir.

== Provincial work ==
Gedroits decided in 1905 to disentangle herself from her marriage and was divorced on 22 December 1905. (Note: Other sources indicate that her husband was killed in an accident when part of the construction of the Trans-Siberian Railway collapsed.) Her maiden name and her noble title were restored on 1 February 1907. At the Maltsov factory, she continued to see many chronic diseases and began cataloguing the cases of bone tuberculosis, infection, and inguinal hernia for future scientific study. She recommended that special institutions designed to treat chronic patients be established. Gedroits published 17 scientific papers between 1902 and 1909. In addition to hernias and industrial injuries, her publications also covered surgeries for obstetrics, the thyroid gland, and various tumors which she had seen in her patients. Her operating experiences included abdominal and chest wounds, amputations, ectopic pregnancy, facial and tendon reconstructions, intestinal resection, hysterectomy, skull trepanation, and setting bones.

The Lyudinovskaya Hospital was originally associated with the Lyudinovskaya Mining Plant, but was turned into a surgical hospital serving the nearby communities of the district. Gedroits utilized her Swiss education and battlefield experiences as a basis for bringing it up to modern European standards. She expanded the facility and equipped it with new surgical implements, including white gowns, threads, and gloves. She obtained apparatuses like the D'Arsonval and Tesla high-frequency current instruments and x-ray machines, promoted the use of ether rather than chloroform for anesthesia, and selected special garments for patients and their bed linens, all of which were innovative measures for her time. She also established a pathology and anatomy archive and cooperative agreements with Philip Markowitz Blumenthal's chemical and bacteriological institute on Lubyanka Square in Moscow to improve diagnostics. In addition to her work in the hospital, Gedroits made numerous housecalls, and over a five-year period, reported she had visited 125,363 patients. She received a municipal commendation from the City Council for her merits as a surgeon in 1908.

== Tsarskoye Selo ==
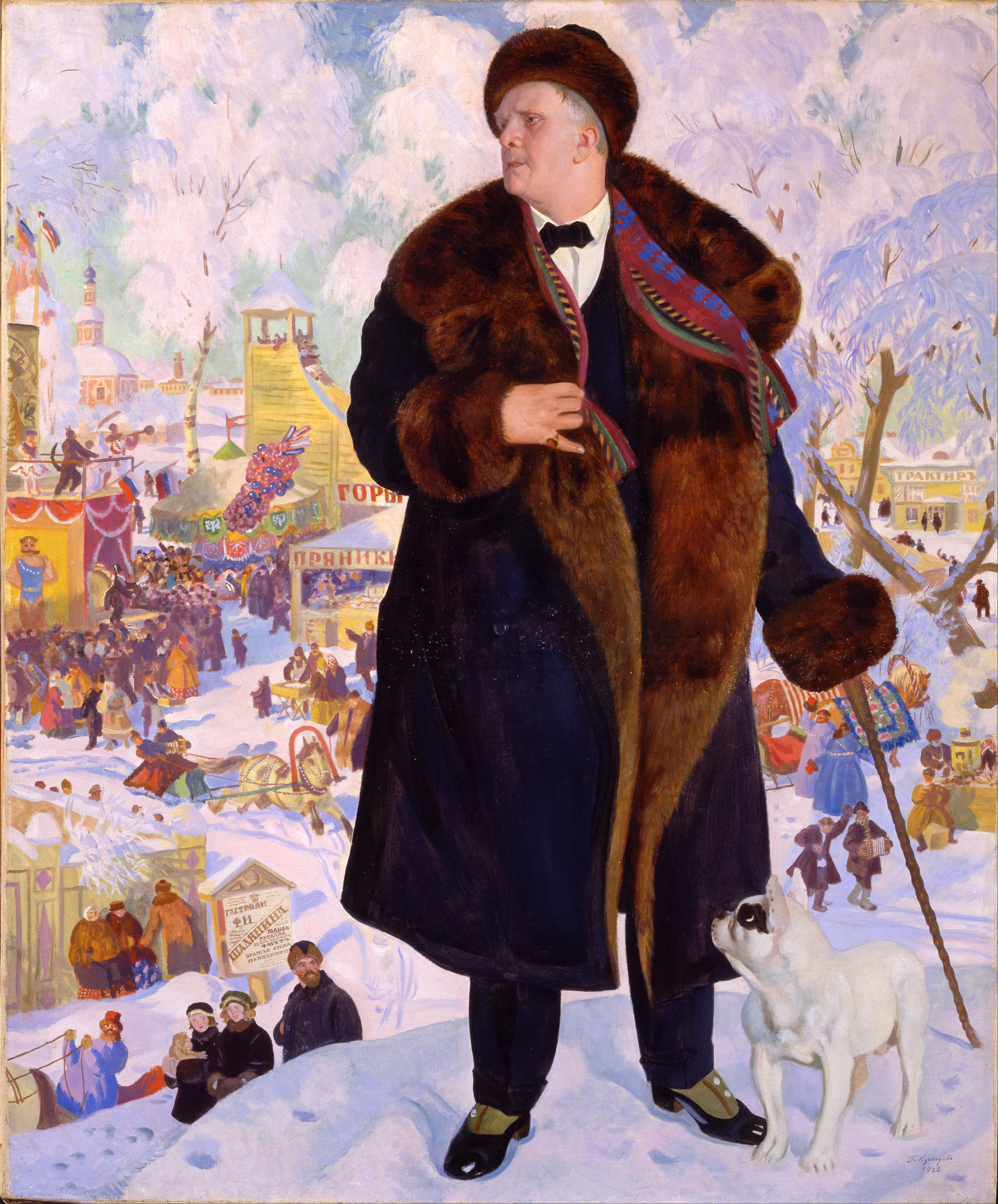
Boris Kustodiev's Portrait of Fyodor Chaliapin in beaver hat and sable coat, dressed in a style emulated by Gedroits

In 1909, at the invitation of Tsarina Alexandra Feodorovna, Gedroits became the senior resident physician at the Tsarskoye Selo Court Hospital, "with a salary of 2,100 rubles and a state apartment". As the royal household's first female physician and the second-highest-ranking member of the hospital's staff, she headed the Departments of Surgery and Gynecology/Obstetrics, while acting as the attending physician for the royal children. As the only medical facility in Tsarskoye Selo, the Court Hospital functioned as a city hospital, with a surgery, a therapeutic department, and an isolation wing for infectious patients. To ensure that they had reference materials, she wrote a textbook for the royals, Беседы о хирургии для сестер и врачей (Conversations on Surgery for Sisters and Doctors), addressing general surgical problems in laymen's terms.

Taking advantage of her position, Gedroits made no attempt to conceal her lesbian inclinations and spoke of herself using masculine verb forms. One biographer, Svetlana Maire, indicated that these manifestations could well have been an attempt to assert her authority as a professional in a male-dominated field. Dressing almost exclusively in men's trousers and suits, she favored a style similar to Feodor Chaliapin's portrait with a beaver hat and a sable fur. She also spoke in a deep-pitched voice and frequently smoked. Besides her appearance, she began seeking the acquaintance and company of literary figures. In her youth, Gedroits had published a collection of poems in 1887, but now she joined the Poets' Guild, publishing her poems under the pen name Sergei Gedroits in such journals as Bright Light, Covenants, and The Theosophical Gazette, among others. Her cultural companions included her former professor, Vassili Rozanov; writers such as Nikolai Gumilev, Razumnik Ivanov-Razumnik, and Aleksey Remizov; and the artist Julius von Klever. In 1910, Gedroits privately published the anthology Стихи и сказки (Poems and Fairytales) in St Petersburg, and though the critical response was not enthusiastic, that same year she published Страницы из жизни заводского врача (Pages from the Life of a Factory Doctor).

Interested in providing support for young writers, in 1911, she paid half the costs to establish the journal Гиперборей (Hyperborea). In parallel, Gedroits was compiling a thesis based on research from her factory days. She successfully earned her doctorate of surgery, the first woman to achieve the distinction from the University of Moscow, on 11 May 1912, after defending her thesis Отдаленные результаты операций паховых грыж по способу профессора Ру на основании 268 операций (Long-term results of inguinal hernia operations using the protocol of Professor Roux based upon 268 operations). The thesis was dedicated to Roux and Pyotr Ivanovich Dyakonov, a Russian surgeon who had been supportive to her work. She published a second volume of poetry, Вег (Veg, representing the beginning letters of her names and possibly inspired by the German Weg meaning "way") in 1913. Once again the critical response, though improved, noted the lassitude and lack of passion in the verse. Her Chinese Tales was published in Precepts magazine in 1913 and a collection of folk poems titled the Red Angel was published in 1914.

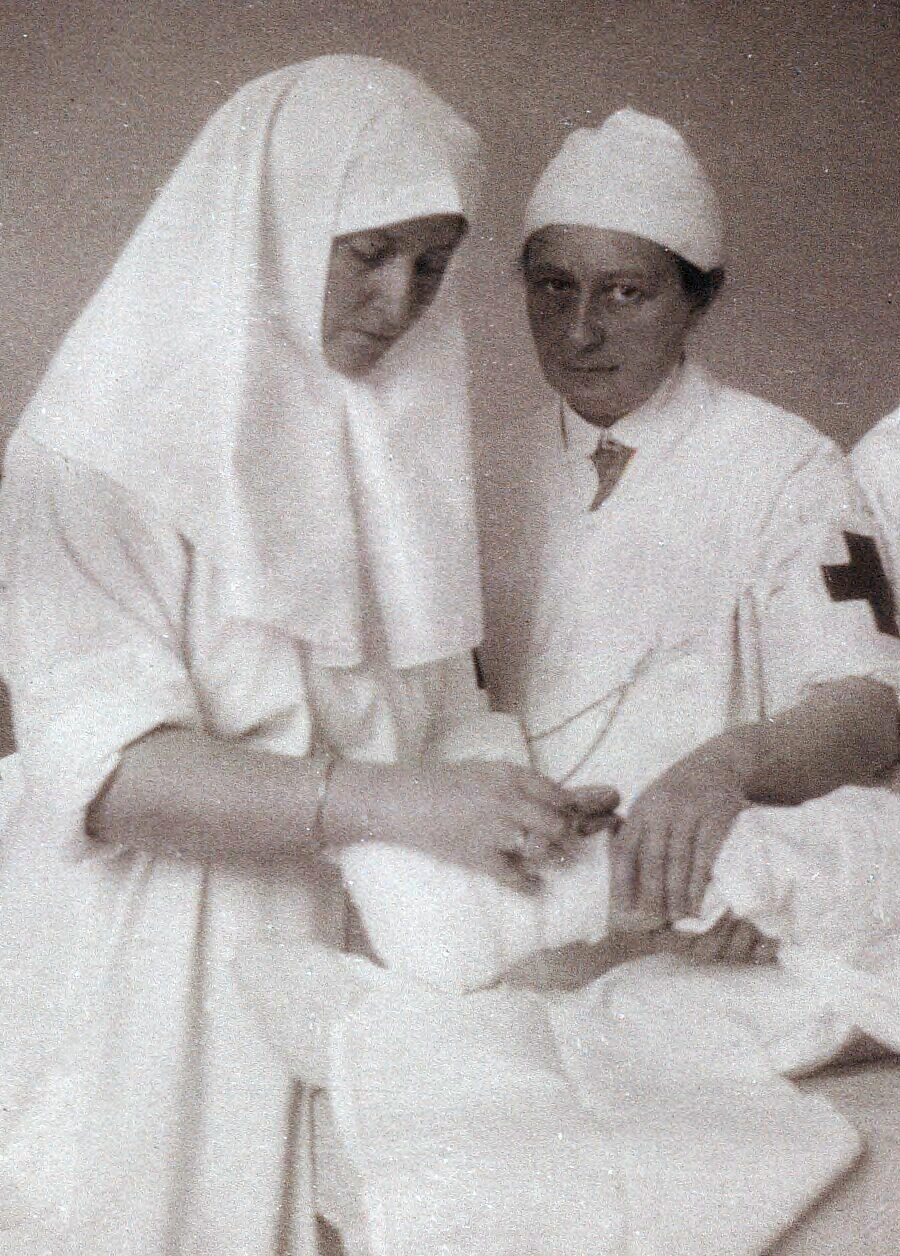
Vera Gedroits (right) with Russian Tsarina Alexandra Feodorovna Romanov

With the outbreak of World War I in 1914, Gedroits worked on equipping the hospital and preparing the staff for war. For example, nurses first learned how to dress wounds and prepare the various bandages, dressings, and equipment that would be needed for treatment, before being trained for surgical support. She taught nursing techniques to the Tsarina and her daughters, Olga and Tatiana, and they became assistants to her in her surgical operations. One of the other nurses she trained at Tsarskoye Selo, Countess Maria Dmitrievna Nirod, would later become Gedroits' life-long partner. Raising funds from the nobles, the hospital was equipped to enable rapid treatment, so that soldiers would not have to be sent to Petrograd, as St. Petersburg was now known. Working with Eugene Botkin and Sergey Vilchievsky, she established networks linking infirmaries and supply trains, and planned evacuation routes for the wounded.

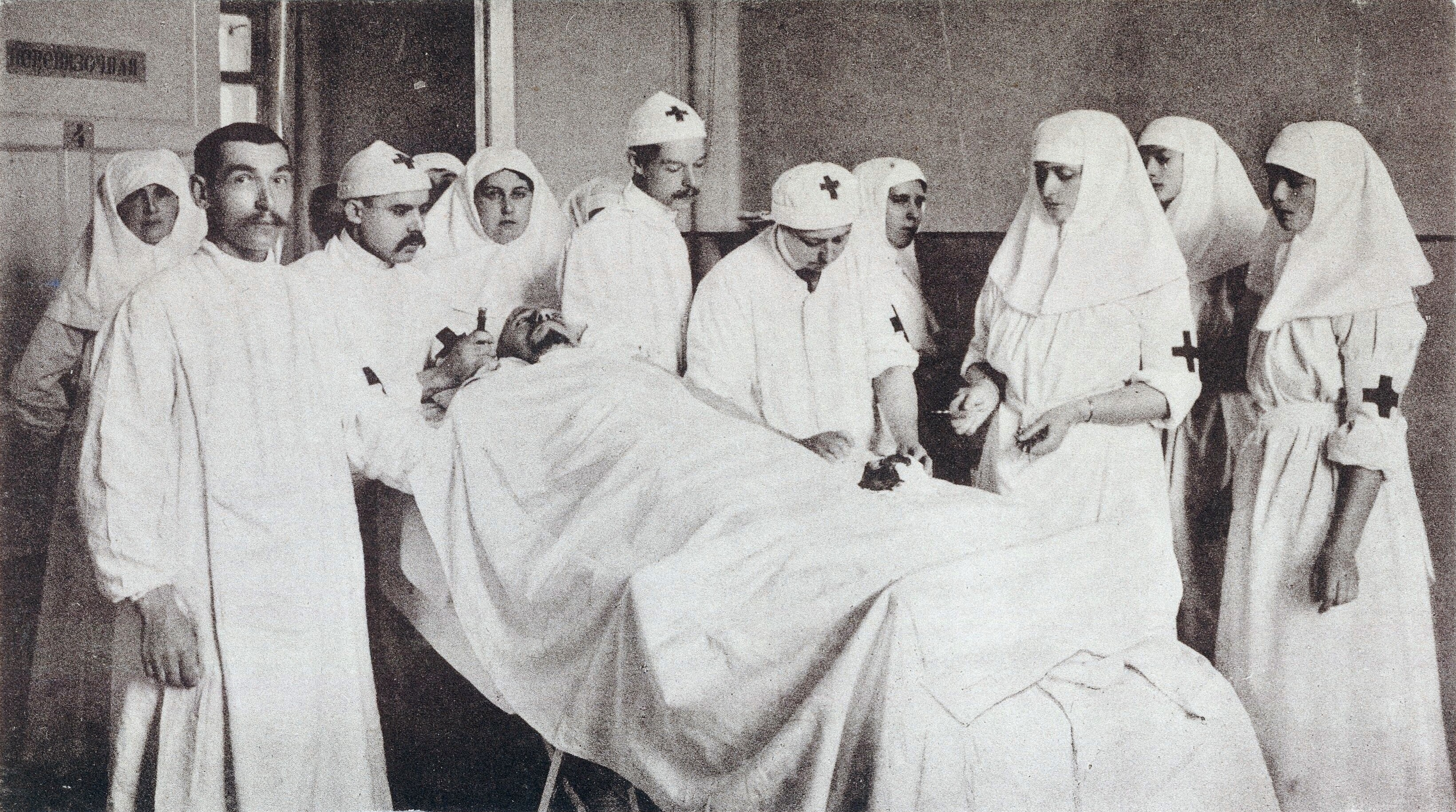
Gedroits (center) operates on a patient, while Tsarina Alexandra and daughters Tatiana and Olga (right) provide assistance

By the end of 1914, Gedroits was mainly involved in serving as the palace physician. Though treating war wounded and giving nursing courses, she was called into service to treat a patient who had a riding accident on the palace grounds, a noblewoman injured in a train crash, as well as the staff of the Tsarina. Her favor with the Tsarina gave her some measure of protection, as she had little patience with Rasputin. Despite this favor, however, one of Gedroits' few medical failures shook the Tsarina's confidence when her favorite maid of honor Anna Vyrubova's treatment was unsuccessful, for although Vyrubova recovered she walked afterward with a limp. Gedroits did have enough influence left to garner a transfer of Nikolai Gumilev from Ulansky Regiment to the Alexandria Hussar Regiment. Periodically, Gedroits would go to the front to compensate for the absence of other surgeons. In one episode in 1916, she performed over 30 operations, mostly trepannings, over a three-day period.

When the February Revolution began in 1917, Gedroits, as an employee of the Tsar, could not openly support the Russian Provisional Government. In order to remain neutral in the conflict, while still honoring her friendship with the Imperial family, she chose to return to work as a military doctor. Having worked for the Tsar, it would have been very unsafe to remain in Petrograd after Tsar Nicholas abdicated. Aged 44, she altered the birth information in her passport and was appointed as chief physician for the 6th Siberian Rifle Regiment. Sent to the front, she served the wounded at the Battle of Galicia in June and July 1917 and was then transferred to the 5th Siberian Rifle Corps as a divisional surgeon, a rank comparable to lieutenant colonel in the Imperial Russian Army. During the demobilization after the October Revolution, Gedroits was injured in January 1918 and taken to a military hospital in the Pechersk neighborhood of Kiev.

== Kiev ==
While recuperating, Gedroits moved in with Countess Nirod, with whom she lived for the remainder of her days. Initially they lived in an apartment on Kruglouniversitetskaya Street, according to their neighbor, Irina Avdiyeva, as a married couple. She published two poems in the Banner of Labor in 1918, Искушение Святого Антония (The Temptation of St. Anthony) and Галицийские рассказы (Galician Stories), which reflected on her war impressions. As soon as she was able to return to work, Gedroits began working in the hospital of the Intercession Monastery and by 1919 had established a clinic to perform maxillofacial surgery. In 1920, when the Kiev Medical Institute organized a surgery department, she was invited by Yevgeny Tcherniakhovsky to join the faculty. In 1921, she began working as an external lecturer, teaching a course on pediatric surgery. She was appointed as a professor of medicine in 1923 and entered a period of publishing as an academic surgeon. In 1924, she published a paper on nutrition and in 1928 wrote an article on surgical procedures for treating tuberculosis in the knee. She published a textbook on pediatric surgery; wrote extensively for surgical journals with articles on surgery, endocrinology and oncology; and participated in surgical conferences.

In 1929, following Tcherniakhovsky's arrest, Gedroits became the departmental head of surgery. But the following year, during the Soviet purge, she was removed from her post and denied a pension. Using funds she had saved, she purchased a house on the outskirts of Kiev, where she and Nirod moved together. Continuing to work as a surgeon from time to time at the Intercession Monastery's hospital, she devoted the next two years to writing, publishing a series of fictionalized autobiographies. The Publishing House of Writers in Leningrad published three of the works of her series Жизнь (Life)—Кафтанчик (The Little Caftan), Лях (The Pole), and Отрыв (The Separation)—in 1931. Unlike her epic poems, which were labeled "особенно неприятны" (especially unpleasant), Gedroits' prose, was called "outstanding". Konstantin Fedin compared her autobiographical works to those of Boris Pasternak. Two other works from this period, Шамань (Shaman) and Смерч (Tornado), were found in the archives of Razumnik Ivanov-Razumnik, which indicate at least one, Shaman, was published. It is also thought that the novel Вдали от Родины (Far from the Homeland) is one of her works. Published in Leningrad in 1926, it is about her Swiss teacher César Roux.

== Death and legacy ==
Diagnosed with cancer in 1931, Gedroits died in March 1932, aged 61, of uterine cancer. She was buried in the Savior-Transfiguration Cemetery, also known as the Korchevat cemetery, of Kiev, by the Archbishop Ermogen (born Alexei Stepanovich Golubev), who had been a patient of hers. She left her personal papers to her neighbors, the painters Irina Avdiyeva and her husband Leonid Povolotsky. During the purges of 1937–1938, the couple's apartment was raided and Gedroits' papers were discovered. One of them was a letter from her professor, César Roux, advising he had bequeathed to Gedroits the Department of Surgery at the University of Geneva. Based upon the letter, the couple were accused of imperialism and Povolotsky was forcibly disappeared.

Gedroits challenged established medical procedure at the beginning of the 20th century and her success with abdominal wound treatment played a part in changing international military medical policy. She is remembered as a pioneer in applying laparotomy for the treatment of abdominal wounds on the battlefront. She was one of Russia's first women to work as a surgeon, the first woman to become a professor of surgery, the first woman to work as a military doctor, and the first woman to serve as a doctor in the imperial palace. The hospital in Fokino, Bryansk Oblast was named in Gedroits' honor and a memorial plaque was dedicated to her memory in front of the former Tsarskoe Selo palace hospital in Pushkin, Saint Petersburg.

== Selected works ==
=== Scientific publications ===
By her own assessment in 1928, Gedroits published 58 scientific papers, which included articles and textbooks dealing with general surgery, as well as facial and dental reconstructions, military fieldwork, and pediatric surgery. Most of her works were released in Russian, though some were published in French, German, or Swedish.

- Гедро́йц (Gedroits), В. И. (V. I.) (1902). "19 случаев коренной операции бедренной грыжи по способу проф. Roux (Lausanne)" [19 cases of radical surgery of the femoral hernia according to the method of Prof. Roux (Lausanne)]. Русский врач (in Russian) (28). St. Petersburg, Russia: 1026.
- Гедро́йц (Gedroits), В. И. (V. I.) (1902). "Коренная операция бедренной грыжи по способу проф. Roux" [A major operation of the femoral hernia according to the method of Prof. Roux]. Русский врач (in Russian) (31). St. Petersburg, Russia: 1123.
- Гедро́йц (Gedroits), В. И. (V. I.) (December 1903). "Отчет больницы завода Мальцевского портланд-цемента Калужской губ. Жиздринского уезда за 1901" [Report of the Hospital of the Maltsev Portland Cement Plant of the Kaluga Gubernia, Zhizdrinsky district for 1901]. Хирургия (in Russian). XIV. St. Petersburg, Russia: 698–699.
- Гедро́йц (Gedroits), В. И. (V. I.) (27 July 1905). Отчет подвижного дворянского отряда [Report of the Mobile Noble Squadron] (Report) (in Russian). Bryansk, Russia: общество Брянских врачей.
- Гедро́йц (Gedroits), В. И. (V. I.) (1906). Новый способ иссечения коленного сустава [A new way of excising the knee joint] (Report) (in Russian). Bryansk, Russia: общество Брянских врачей. p. 48. OCLC 68980749.
- Гедро́йц (Gedroits), В. И. (V. I.) (1909). Отчет главного хирурга фабрик и заводов Мальцовского акционерного Общества [Report of the chief surgeon of the factories and plants of the Maltsovsky Joint Stock Company] (Report) (in Russian). Moscow, Russia: T-vo Skoropech. OCLC 70051335.
- Гедро́йц (Gedroits), В. И. (V. I.) (1912). Отдаленные результаты операций паховых грыж по способу Rom на основании 268 операций: Дисс [Long-term results of inguinal hernia operations according to the Roux method on the basis of 268 operations: Dissertation] (doctorate) (in Russian). Moscow, Russia: University of Moscow.
- Гедро́йц (Gedroits), В. И. (V. I.) (1914). Беседы о хирургии для сестер и врачей [Conversations on Surgery for Sisters and Doctors] (in Russian). St. Petersburg, Russia.
- Гедро́йц (Gedroits), В. И. (V. I.) (1924). "Биологическое обоснование питания" [Biological foundations of nutrition]. Вестник стоматологии (in Russian) (6): 19–26.
- Гедро́йц (Gedroits), В. И. (V. I.) (1928). "Хирургическое лечение при туберкулезе колена" [Surgical treatment of tuberculosis of the knee]. Русск. клин (in Russian) (9): 693–704.

=== Literary publications ===
In the archives of Razumnik Ivanov-Razumnik, Gedroits' collection of fictionalized autobiographies, Жизнь (Life), confirmed that four volumes, The Little Caftan, The Pole (as in person of Polish descent), The Separation and Shaman had been published. The unpublished volume Tornado was also discovered in this archive. The archive of personal effects Gedroits left to Irina Avdiyeva contained an unfinished poem, Великий Андрогин (старец Досифсй или Дарья) (The great Androgyne (the elder Dosifs or Darya) and a prose article Куски людей (Pieces of people), as well as a school notebook and two diaries from 1914.

- Гедро́йц (Gedroits), Сергей (Sergei) (1910). Стихи и сказки [Poems and Fairytales] (in Russian). St. Petersburg, Russia: Русскай скоропопулярный. OCLC 228725552.
- Гедро́йц (Gedroits), Сергей (Sergei) (1910). "Страницы из жизни заводского врача" [Notes on the life of a factory doctor]. Светлый луч (in Russian) (2).
- Гедро́йц (Gedroits), Сергей (Sergei) (1913). Вег [Veg (The Way or an acronym of her name)] (in Russian). St. Petersburg, Russia: Цеха поэтов.
- Гедро́йц (Gedroits), Сергей (Sergei) (1930). Кафтанчик [The Little Caftan] (in Russian). Leningrad, USSR: Издательство писателей. OCLC 228725549.
- Гедро́йц (Gedroits), Сергей (Sergei) (1931). Лях [The Pole] (in Russian). Leningrad, USSR: Издательство писателей. OCLC 81171108.
- Гедро́йц (Gedroits), Сергей (Sergei) (1931). Отрыв [The Separation] (in Russian). Leningrad, USSR: Издательство писателей.
- Гедро́йц (Gedroits), Сергей (Sergei) (c. 1931). Шамань [Shaman] (in Russian). Leningrad, USSR: Издательство писателей.
