= Maria Nirod =

Russian countess and nurse (1879–1965)

- Мария Муханова
- Born: Maria Dmitrievna Mukhanova; 24 May 1879; Tsarskoye Selo, Saint Petersburg, Russian Empire
- Died: 11 October 1965 (aged 86); Kiev, Ukrainian SSR, Soviet Union
- Other names: Maria Dmitrievna Nirod-Mukhanova, Maria von Nierodt
- Occupation: nurse
- Years active: 1913–1932

Countess Maria Nirod (24 May 1879 – 11 October 1965) was a Russian maid of honour in the imperial court of Nicholas II and Alexandra of Russia. After her husband's death, she trained as a surgical nurse and assisted in the surgery of Dr. Vera Gedroits, who became her life partner. After serving as a nurse in World War I and during the Russian Revolution, she fled with her children to Kiev. She served as a surgical nurse in Kiev until Gedroits' death and later ran a pharmacy which provided medications to the poor.

== Early life ==
Maria Dmitrievna Mukhanova was born on 24 May 1879 in Tsarskoye Selo at St. Petersburg, Russia, to Maria Alexandrovna (née Kovalkova) and Dmitry Ilyich Mukhanov. She was descended through her maternal great-grandmother Vera Vasilievna Lukashevich-Trepova (Russian: Вера Васильевна Лукашевич-Трепова) of Ukrainian aristocrats, including hetmans Petro Doroshenko, Ivan Skoropadsky, and Danylo Apostol, as well as the judge Vasily Kochubey. Mukhanova served in the Imperial Palace as a maid of honour. On 3 February 1903, she married Count Feydor Mikhailovich Nirod, an adjutant's aide and Lieutenant in the Equestrian Regiment of the Imperial Guard. His family descended from Karl von Nierodt (von Nieroth), commander of the Knights of the Teutonic Order. They had two children, Feydor (1907–1996) and Marina. The count died in 1913 at the age of thirty-six, after undergoing an unsuccessful surgery. His death plunged Nirod into a mental breakdown and she spent a year undergoing treatment in St. Petersburg and Wiesbaden, before returning to Tsarskoye Selo to care for her children.

== Career ==
At the outbreak of World War I the Hospital at Tsarskoye Selo was prepared for war and Vera Gedroits trained noble women to work there as nurses. Nirod trained as a surgical nurse and worked in the hospital. She and her children lived in the dormitory of the palace and were neighbors of Gedroits. By the outbreak of the February Revolution the safety of nobles in St. Petersburg was insecure. Under the protection of a former senator and the monks from the Kiev Pechersk Lavra, Nirod and her children, along with Maria Nikolaevna Ignatieva, Zoya Nikolaevna Rodzianko fled from Leningrad and arrived in Kiev in 1918. After some months in the monastery, Nirod and Gedroits along with the children moved to an apartment on Kruglouniversitetskaya Street. The two women lived as a married couple, which prompted both anger and admiration from Nirod's children.

As she had in St. Petersburg, the Countess served as a surgical nurse to Gedroits. They were arrested many times. Nirod's son recalled an incident where he returned to the house finding officers inside, who arrested his mother and her lover. The couple disappeared for some months and then miraculously returned. According to their neighbor, the artist, Irina Dmitrievna Avdiyeva, Gedroits had once successfully operated on a powerful benefactor, who always secured their release. After Gedroits was removed from her faculty post in 1930, she bought a farm on the outskirts of Kiev, where the couple lived until her death in 1932. After Gedroits died, the property was sold and Nirod lived for a time at the Vvedenskyi Monastery. Later, she bought a property in the village of Trotsche near the city of Zhytomyr, where she operated a pharmacy, providing free medicines to the poor.

== Death and legacy ==
Near the end of her life, Nirod suffered from dementia. She died on 11 October 1965 in Kiev and was buried in the Baikove Cemetery. Her son, Feydor, became an artist, who was most known for his scenographic work for the National Opera of Ukraine.
