= Daria Dolgorukova =

Wife of Hetman Ivan Briukhovetsky

- Russian: Дарья Долгорукова; Ukrainian: Дарія Долгорукова
- Born: 1639; Moscow
- Died: April/May 1669 (aged 29–30); Chyhyryn
- Spouse: Ivan Briukhovetsky (m. 1665; died 1668)
- Father: Dmitriy Dolgorukov

Daria Dolgorukova (Ukrainian: Дарія Долгорукова (Брюховецька); Russian: Дарья Долгорукова (Брюховецкая); 1639 in Moscow, Tsardom of Russia – 1669 in Chyhyryn, Cossack Hetmanate) was the wife of the Ukrainian Hetman Ivan Briukhovetsky (r. 1663–1668). She is known in connection to a witch trial – after her miscarriage, her spouse persecuted and executed several women accused of having caused it by use of magic. After the death of her husband, she was imprisoned by his successor.

== Origin ==
Daria Dolgorukova was from the Russian princely family of Dolgorukov. The father is considered Dmitriy Dolgorukov, who was a Tsar entourage. Daria's maternal aunt was Maria Miloslavskaya, the first wife of the Russian Tsar Alexis I.

However, according to the version of the Ukrainian researcher Vadym Modzalevskyi, Daria was the stepdaughter of Dmitriy Dolgorukov. Her mother was actually Dolgorukov's fourth wife, Paraskeva Timofievna Yelagina (sister of Ivan Yelagin, the leader of all Russian riflemen) from her first husband, Olferiy Iskanskaya. For now, most researchers agree with the latter version. This explains the different information about Briukhovetsky's marriage to representatives of the Dolgorukov, Yelagin and Iskansky, which is why it was believed for a long time that the Ukrainian Hetman had several marriages with a woman named Daria.

== Biography ==
Daria was born in 1639 in Moscow. In 1665, she married the Ukrainian Hetman Ivan Briukhovetsky. Russian servants who introduced their customs at the Hetman's court came to Ukraine with her. When Daria suffered a miscarriage after becoming pregnant for the first time, the women of Hadiach were accused of killing the unborn child, after which Briukhovetsky began a witch hunt, killing many women, including those from his entourage.

On June 17, 1668, Briukhovetsky was killed, and his successor, Petro Doroshenko, captured Daria and sent her to Chyhyryn together with her children, where she died in April or May 1669.

Briukhovetsky's young daughter was sent to Hadiach, where she grew up and later became the wife of the Chernihiv colonel (Ukrainian: полковник, romanized: polkovnyk) Hryhorii Samoilovych, the son of another Ukrainian Hetman, Ivan Samoilovych.
