= Efrosinia Yanenko-Khmelnytska =

Ukrainian First Lady

Efrosinia Doroshenko Єфросинія Дорошенко

First Lady of Ukraine
- In office 1665–1669
- President: Petro Doroshenko
- Preceded by: Daria Dolgorukova
- Succeeded by: Anastasia Ihnatovych

Personal details
- Born: Efrosinia Yanenko-Khmelnytska
- Died: 1684 Yaropolchy
- Spouse: Petro Doroshenko
- Occupation: Former First Lady of Ukraine

Efrosinia Yanenko-Khmelnytska (died 1684), was a Ukrainian Hetmana by marriage to Petro Doroshenko, Hetman of Zaporizhian Host (r. 1665–1676). She was an influential figure among the Ukrainian Cossacks. She is known for her alleged life style, as she was said to have several extramarital affairs, and also for a myth regarding her importance for the independence of Ukraine.
