= Battle of Saradzhyn =

- Part of the Right-bank uprising (1664–1665)
Date	July 1664
Location	Saradzhynsky Forest, Right-Bank Ukraine
Result	See § Aftermath

Belligerents
Zaporozhian Cossacks; Kalmyk Khanate	Polish-Lithuanian Commonwealth; Crimean Khanate

Commanders and leaders
Ivan Sirko	Sebastian Machowski; Wacław Leszczyński; Khan-Mambet Shirin

Strength
2,500; 300	3,000–4,000; Unknown

Casualties and losses
Possibly light Heavy	Heavy

The Battle of Saradzhyn (Ukrainian: Сараджинська битва, romanized: Saradzhynska bytva) or Saradzhyn Ambush, also known as Battle of Gorodische took place in the Saradzhynsky Forest in July 1664 as part of the Right-bank uprising (1664–1665). The clash was between forces of the Polish-Lithuanian Commonwealth and Crimean Khanate on the one hand, and troops of the Sich Cossacks and Kalmyk Khanate on the other.

== Prelude ==
Ivan Sirko led his Cossack detachment with Kalmyks in raids on Tatar settlements. After plundering several Tatar settlements in the lands of Budjak and Nogai Hordes, Sirko was returning with his Cossack detachment, Kalmyk allies and loot. Polish-Tatar forces during that time planned an ambush in Saradzhynsky Forest, knowing Sirko would pass there.

== Battle ==
Polish commanders S. Machowski, W. Leszczyński and Tatar Khan-Mambet Shirin with 3,000–4,000 Polish soldiers and unspecified number of Crimean Tatars chose a place of ambush on the hill where it would be difficult to retreat from. Polish-Tatar forces had observation over the path from which Cossack-Kalmyk forces would be passing.

Due to the terrain, Sirko with the Cossacks advanced in a narrow column, while Kalmyks served as the rearguard. The main blow was aimed at the end of the column, where Kalmyk detachment was stationed. The goal would be to isolate individual Cossack units in order to defeat them. With all of these factors taken into account, the Cossacks would only be able to fight out of the ambush by making a decisive breakthrough through Polish formations. It is unknown whether Polish forces attempted to pursue the Cossacks, but the main thrust of the Cossacks would have been aimed at Polish soldiers while the Tatars were busy engaging the Kalmyks. The Polish forces would need time to recover from the Cossack blow and the Tatars would be too busy fighting the Kalmyks, plundering the convoys afterwards. The Kalmyks tried to break out of encirclement and put up a desperate resistance, tying up a significant portion of enemy forces. Sirko and the Cossacks broke out of the encirclement.

== Aftermath ==
Some sources say this battle resulted ina defeat of both the Kalmyks and the Cossacks. Other sources say that only the Kalmyks were defeated in battle, while Sirko and the Cossacks fought out of the ambush with light losses. The Eyewitness Chronicle only mentions a Kalmyk defeat, while Sirko and the Cossacks with some casualties reached the Sich, then went to Kharkiv. Examination of Sirko's skeleton showed a presence of severe wounds, still visible after 300 years, which he allegedly received in this battle. Ukrainian researcher Draganenko believes that Sirko avoided defeat in this battle, since he continued his operations in Bratslav region against Polish-Tatar forces. Draganenko argued that Sirko would have remained in the Sich to recover if Cossacks suffered heavy losses and he was severely wounded.

== Bibliography ==
- Draganenko, V. P. (2013). "Трагічний Бій Івана Сірка" [Tragic Battle of Ivan Sirko] (PDF) (in Ukrainian). Миколаївський Національний Університет імені В.О. Сухомлинського.
