= Yaropolets =

Village in Volokolamsky District, Moscow Oblast, Russia

Coordinates: 56°07′50″N 35°49′27″E

Yaropolets (Russian: Ярополе́ц) is a village in Russia's Volokolamsky District in Moscow Oblast.

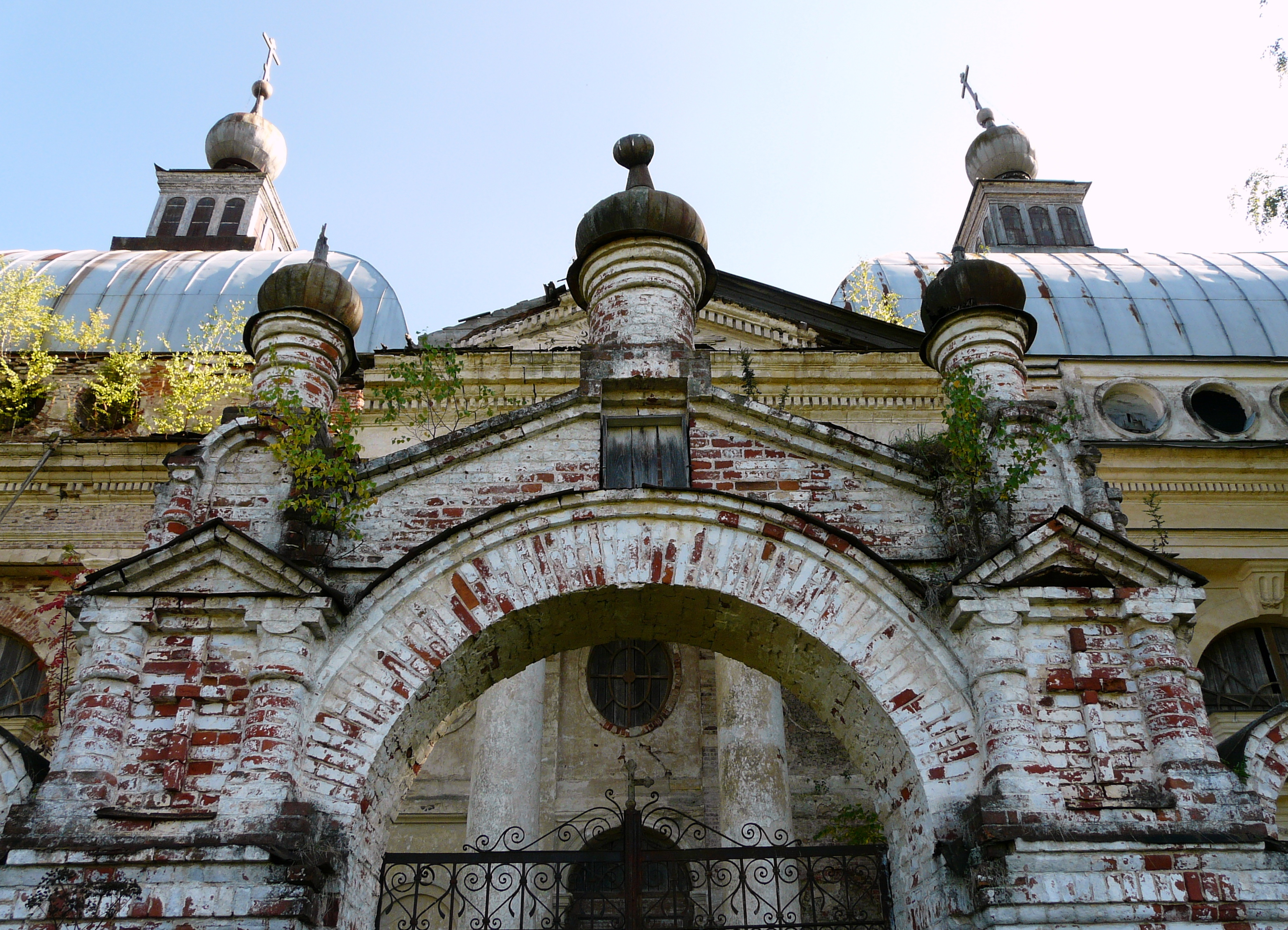
Church of our Lady of Kazan Yaropolets

While small, the village has several attractions. It is home to both the Goncharov Estate and the Chernyshev Estate, The Church of Our Lady of Kazan, and Russia's first rural hydroelectric power station. Cossack political and military leader, Hetman of Right-bank Ukraine Petro Doroshenko is buried in the village.
