= Volokolamsky District =

Volokolamsky District Волоколамский район (Russian)
- District
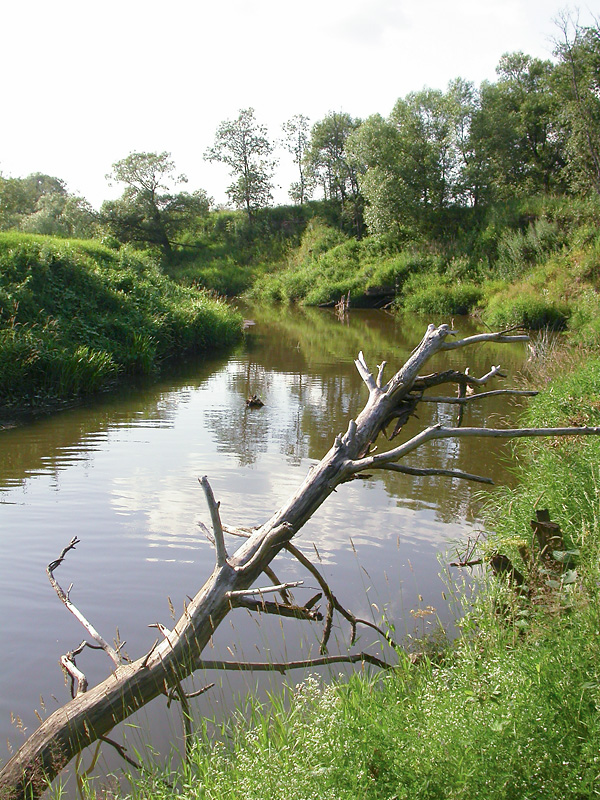
- The Lama River near Yaropolets in Volokolamsky District

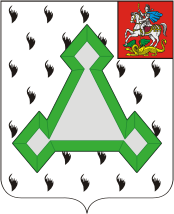
- Flag Coat of arms
- Location of Volokolamsky District in Moscow Oblast (before July 2012)
- Coordinates: 56°02′N 35°57′E
- Country: Russia
- Federal subject: Moscow Oblast
- Established: 1929
- Administrative center: Volokolamsk

Area
  - Total: 1,683.51 km^{2} (650.01 sq mi)

Population (2010 Census)
  - Total: 53,244
  - Density: 31.627/km^{2} (81.913/sq mi)
  - Urban: 49.8%
  - Rural: 50.2%

Administrative structure
  - Administrative divisions: 1 Towns, 1 Work settlements, 6 Rural settlements
  - Inhabited localities: 1 cities/towns, 1 urban-type settlements, 267 rural localities

Municipal structure
  - Municipally incorporated as: Volokolamsky Municipal District
  - Municipal divisions: 2 urban settlements, 6 rural settlements
- Website: http://www.volokolamsk-rayon.ru/

Volokolamsky District (Russian: Волокола́мский райо́н) is an administrative and municipal district (raion), one of the thirty-six in Moscow Oblast, Russia. It is located in the west of the oblast and borders with Mozhaysky District in the south, Shakhovskoy District in the west, Lotoshinsky District in the northwest, Klinsky District in the northeast, and with Istrinsky and Ruzsky Districts in the east. The area of the district is 1,683.51 square kilometers (650.01 sq mi). Its administrative center is the town of Volokolamsk. Population: 53,244 (2010 Census); 49,032 (2002 census); 37,863 (1989 Soviet census). The population of Volokolamsk accounts for 44.0% of the district's total population.

== Geography ==
Forests cover about 40% of the district's territory. Main rivers include the Ruza and the Lama.

== History ==
The district was established in 1929 and its territory was significantly expanded in 1957.

== Attractions ==
The main attractions include the Volokolamsk Kremlin, the Joseph-Volokolamsk Monastery in the selo of Teryayevo located 17 kilometers (11 mi) from Volokolamsk and Moscow Raceway circuit.
