= Pavlo Teteria =

Ukrainian noble

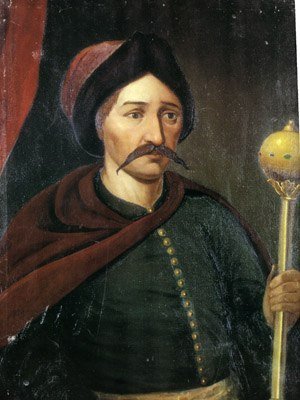
- Portrait, 19th century

Hetman of Zaporizhian Host
- In office 1663–1665
- Preceded by: Yuri Khmelnytsky (as Hetman of Ukraine)
- Succeeded by: Petro Doroshenko

Personal details
- Born: c. 1620 Pereiaslav, Polish–Lithuanian Commonwealth
- Died: 1671 Edirne, Ottoman Empire
- Spouse(s): Tetyana Vyhovska; Kateryna Khmelnytska
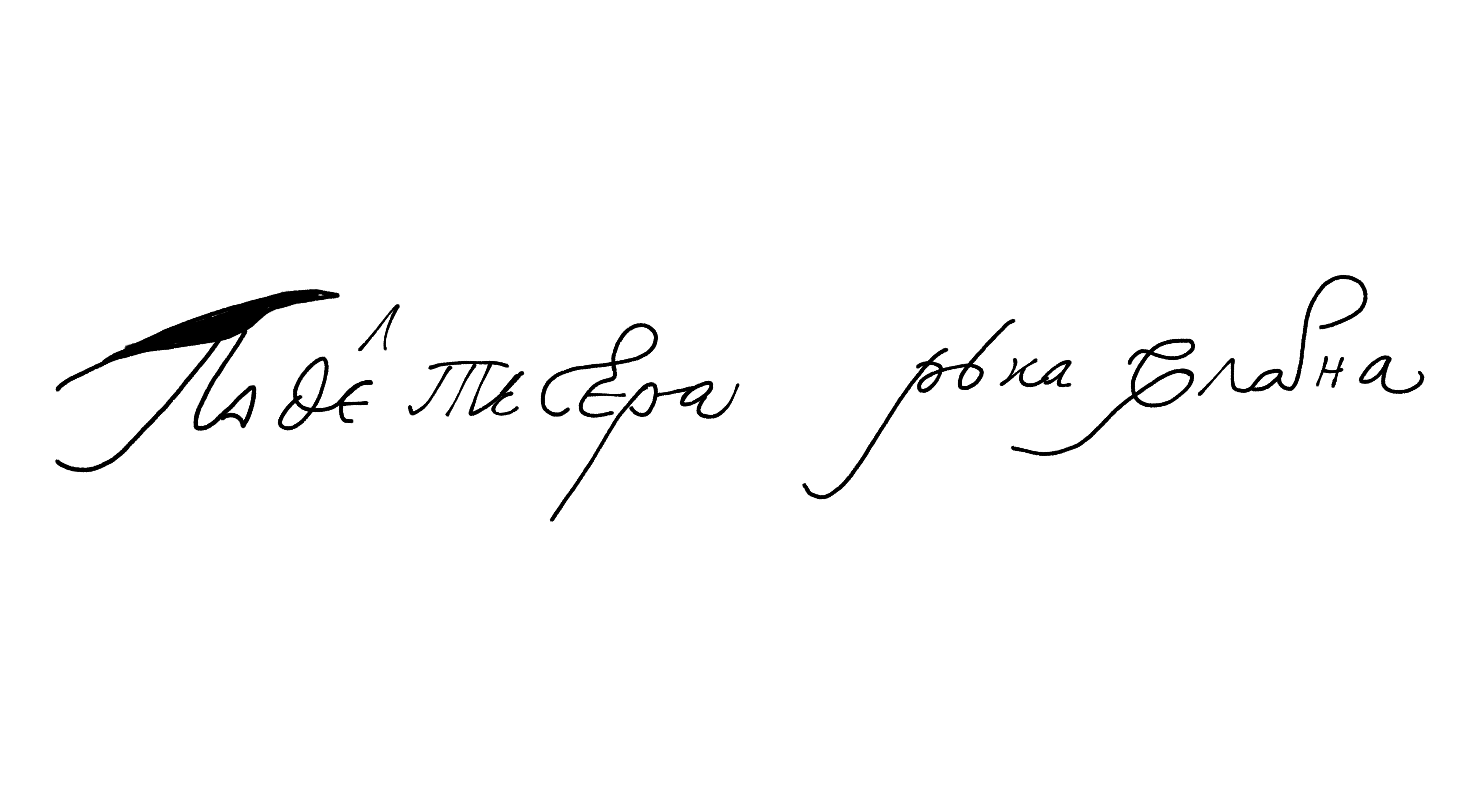
- Signature

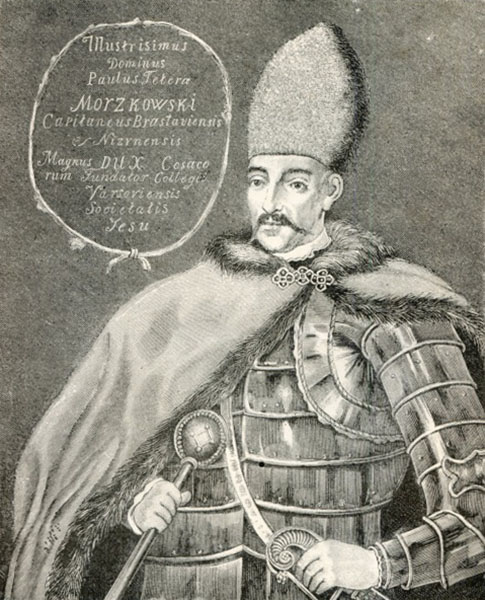
Illustrius Dominus Paulus Tetera Morzkowski, Capitaneus Braclaviensis et Nizrnensis, Magnus Dux Cossacorum, Fundator Collegii Varsoviensis Societatis Jesu

Pavlo Teteria (Ruthenian: Павел Тетера; Ukrainian: Павло Тетеря; Polish: Paweł Morzkowski herbu Ślepowron; c. 1620 – 1671) was Hetman of Right-bank Ukraine (1663–1665). His real name was Pavlo Morzhkovsky. Before his hetmancy he served in a number of high positions under Bohdan Khmelnytsky, and Ivan Vyhovsky.

== Brief outlook ==
When the Khmelnytsky Uprising broke out he served as a regimental secretary of Pereyaslav; shortly afterwards he was appointed the deputy of the general secretary. Later he assumed the post of the Pereyaslav colonel, while still continuing to act as deputy general secretary. He was one of the Ukrainian delegates that were sent to conduct the Treaty of Pereyaslav.

Teteria participated in the negotiations aimed at uniting Ukraine back into the Polish–Lithuanian Commonwealth. When a civil war between Right-bank Cossacks and Left-bank Cossacks broke out, he openly supported pro-Polish policies, and was elected Hetman in the Right-bank Ukraine in 1663.

Teteria family coat of arms

He participated with the Poles in a campaign into Left-Bank Ukraine, but in 1665 he abdicated because of political and social unrests in Right-bank. Teteria fled to Poland, but eventually came into conflict with the Polish nobility and left for Turkey, where he died plotting an invasion of Poland.

== Biography ==
He was the son in law of hetman Bohdan Khmelnytsky, when he married his daughter Olena Khmelnytsky in 1660. Teteria was educated at the Kyivan Mohyla College and he was member of the Lviv Dormition Brotherhood. He joined the Cossack army when the Khmelnytsky Uprising broke out in 1648. He began his official service as a regimental secretary for the Pereyaslav regiment. Shortly after he became the deputy of the general secretary. He was part of the delegation that accompanied Tymofiy Khmelnytsky to Iaşi to marry Ruxandra the daughter of the Moldavian Voivode Vasile Lupu. In July 1653, Teteria assumed the position of colonel of Pereyaslav, while still maintaining the office of deputy general secretary.

In April 1654, Teteria and Samiilo Bohdanovych-Zarudny were part of the Ukrainian delegation sent to Moscow to conduct the Treaty of Pereyaslav with the Tsardom of Russia. This treaty placed the Cossack Hetmanate and the Zaporozhian Host under the protection of the Tsar. When Vyhovsky was proclaimed hetman, Teteria was appointed as the hetman's chancellor secretary. He participated in the negotiations of the Treaty of Hadiach, which would restore Ukraine back into the Commonwealth, as a third and autonomous state, under the ultimate sovereignty of the King of Poland. The treaty led to a civil war known as The Ruin, when he openly supported pro-Polish policy and pressured the young, and inexperienced Yuri Khmelnytsky to abdicate.

=== Hetman ===
First at the officer's council in Chyhyryn in October 1662 and then the cossack council meeting in Chyhyryn on 2 January 1663 Teteria officially succeed Khmelnytsky as the Hetman of Ukraine. Once in power he had Cossack leaders executed and imprisoned, because he perceived them as possible rivals. Teteria had Vyhovsky, Ivan Bohun executed, and had Yuri Khmelnytsky imprisoned. Teteria followed a strong line of Polish policies, and was unwilling to forge an independent Cossack policy. In 1664 along with Jan II Casimir Vasa he led an invasion into Left-bank Ukraine. When the attack failed, Teteria returned to the Right-bank but Cossack-led peasant uprisings against his rule occurred because of the detested behaviors of him and his Polish allies to common cossacks, and peasants. In 1665 unable to cope with the social unrests, particularly the "Drozd Uprising", Teteria abdicated and fled to Poland.

In Poland he converted to Catholicism from Orthodoxy and was given high administrative posts in Polatsk. Eventually he got into disputes with Polish magnates and fell upon misfortune. Unable to gain any sufficient support from the Polish Sejm, he left for Adrianopolis, where he died plotting an invasion of Poland.
