= Petro Doroshenko =

Hetman of Ukrainian Cossacks

- Петро Дорошенко
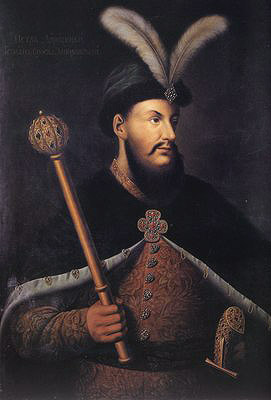
- Posthumous portrait, 19th century

Hetman of Zaporizhian Host
- In office 10 October 1665 – 19 September 1676
- Preceded by: Pavlo Teteria
- Succeeded by: title surrendered to Ivan Samoylovych

Personal details
- Born: 1627 Chyhyryn, Kiev Voivodeship, Polish–Lithuanian Commonwealth
- Died: 19 November 1698 (aged 70–71) Volokolamsk, Tsardom of Russia
- Spouse: Efrosinia Yanenko-Khmelnytska
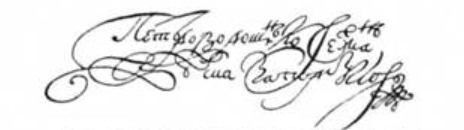
- Signature

Petro Dorofiiovych Doroshenko (Note: In other languages: Russian: Пётр Дорофеевич Дорошенко, romanized: Pyotr Dorofeyevich Doroshenko Polish: Piotr Doroszenko) (Old Ukrainian: Петро / Петръ Дорошен(ъ)ко, modern Ukrainian: Петро Дорофійович Дорошенко; 1627–1698) was a Cossack political and military leader, hetman of Right-bank Ukraine (1665–1672) and Russian voivode. His frequent change of allegiances between neighbouring powers has made the hetman a controversial figure in Ukrainian history.

== Background and early career ==
Petro Doroshenko
- Coat of arms
- Noble family: Doroshenko family

Petro Doroshenko was born in Chyhyryn into a noble Zaporozhian Cossack family with a strong tradition of leadership. His father, a Registered Cossack, held the rank of colonel, and his grandfather Mykhailo held the bulava (c. 1623 to 1628) as the hetman of the Registered Cossack Army.

Though it is not known where Doroshenko studied, there is no doubt that he received an excellent education. Doroshenko became fluent in Latin and Polish and had a broad knowledge of history. In 1648 Doroshenko joined the forces of Bohdan Khmelnytsky in the 1648-1657 uprising against the Polish domination of Ukraine. In the earlier stages of the uprising Doroshenko carried out both military and diplomatic roles. He primarily served in the Chyhyryn regiment, where he held the rank of artillery secretary, eventually being appointed colonel of the Pryluky regiment in 1657. When Khmelnytsky died in 1657 Doroshenko supported the election of General Chancellor (Ukrainian: Генеральний писар, romanized: Heneralny pysar) Ivan Vyhovsky as Khmelnytsky's successor. Between 1657 and 1658 he helped Hetman Vyhovsky (in office: 1657–1659) to suppress the pro-Russian uprising of Iakiv Barabash and Martyn Pushkar, a bloody fratricidal conflict which resulted in some 50,000 deaths.

Zaporizhian Hetman Pavlo Teteria, who was in office from 1663 to 1665, promoted Doroshenko to the rank of his chief (general) yesaul in 1663. Doroshenko became the leader of the Cossack starshyna (senior officers) and of the elements within the ecclesiastical authorities who opposed the 1654 Pereiaslav Agreement between the Cossacks and the Tsardom of Russia. Supported by Crimean Tatars and by Ottoman Turkey in 1665, Doroshenko crushed the pro-Russian Cossack bands and eventually became Hetman of Ukraine (Right-bank Ukraine) on 10 October 1665.

== Hetman ==
=== Hetmancy and Treaty of Andrusovo ===
Poland withdrew from the Right-bank Ukraine because of the numerous peasant and Cossack uprisings by rebels, who sought to secure their liberties with military support from countries other than Poland and Moscow. They found it in the realm of the Ottoman Empire, the Crimean Khanate. In the beginning, the first hetman recognized by Crimea was Medvedivka Sotnyk (captain) Stepan Opara. However, in the same summer of 1665, he was replaced by Doroshenko. To strengthen his new position, Doroshenko introduced reforms in hope of winning the respect of the rank and file Cossacks. Doroshenko would often organize general councils where he would listen to the lower classes' opinions.

To rid himself of the dependence on the starshyna (senior officers), the hetman created the Serdiuk regiments which consisted of 20,000 mercenary infantry units, which took orders only from him. When his hetmancy began, Doroshenko, like all right-bank hetmans, followed a pro-Polish line, but he quickly changed that policy upon hearing the signing of the 1667 Treaty of Andrusovo. The treaty officially divided Ukraine between Russia and Poland, with Russia gaining sovereignty over Left-bank Ukraine and Poland acquiring Right-bank Ukraine. Once the news reached Doroshenko, he reportedly suffered a seizure upon learning of the partition of Ukraine. Doroshenko quickly deserted his pro-Polish position and decided to seek aid from the Ottoman Empire.

=== War with Poland and Turkish alliance ===
In the winter of 1666 Doroshenko, with support of Crimean Tatars, defeated the Polish forces at the Battle of Brailov, however in the fall of 1667 he lost the Battle of Podhajce. After the battle, Doroshenko's opposition, led by the Kosh Otaman Ivan Sirko and Tatars stopped his further advance against Poles.

=== Left-bank uprising ===
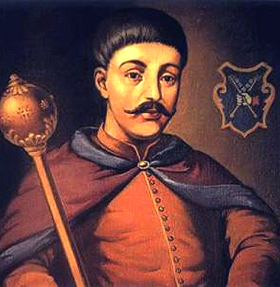
Ivan Briukhovetsky

With the right bank seemingly secured, Doroshenko and his men crossed into left-bank Ukraine and supported an uprising of Ivan Briukhovetsky against Russia.

Following Briukhovetsky's execution, Doroshenko was proclaimed the hetman of all Ukraine on 18 June [O.S. 8 June] 1668. As Doroshenko was reaching his zenith of power after successfully reuniting Ukraine, his numerous enemies united against him. The new Polish offensive forced him to return to the right-bank Ukraine, appointing Demian Mnohohrishny acting hetman of the left-bank. Doroshenko managed to secure the release from Polish captivity of the Metropolitan of Kiev, Galicia and all Ruthenia – Yosyf Tukalsky-Neliubovych – who moved his seat to Chyhyryn.

=== Alliance with the Ottomans ===
In January 1668 the Council of Officers (Seniors) in Chyhyryn expressed its support for Doroshenko's intentions to ally with the Ottoman Empire. In autumn of 1668 the Cossack delegation was sent to Constantinople with a proposal for military alliance between the Cossack state and the Ottoman Empire. The alliance was approved again at the 1669 Korsun Cossack Council (General Military Council) on 10–12 March. The alliance was eventually proclaimed by sultan Mehmed IV on 1 May 1669, Doroshenko receiving a title of Sanjak-bey.

=== Separatism of Mnohohrishny, Sukhoviy and Khanenko ===
At the same time, during the fall of 1668, Demian Mnohohrishny pledged his allegiance to Russia and on 13 March 1669 his election was confirmed. Also in the fall of 1668 some Zaporizhian Cossacks who opposed Doroshenko elected new hetman the Zaporizhian Sich chancellor Petro Sukhoviy who also secured support of Crimean Tatars. Sukhoviy challenged Doroshenko, but he was defeated at the battle of Olkhivets by the troops of Petro Doroshenko and Ivan Sirko. In the summer of 1669, Sukhoviy along with Tatars attacked Doroshenko, but the Ottomans requested for Crimean Tatars to withdraw their support for Sukhoviy. In June 1669, Sukhoviy was deposed, and he supported the election of the Uman Regiment Colonel Mykhailo Khanenko. Eventually, Sukhoviy escaped to Crimea after Khanenko was defeated by Doroshenko at the battle of Stebliv on 29 October 1669.

In 1670 in Ostroh through the local commission, Doroshenko attempted to revive the principles of the 1658 Treaty of Hadiach by negotiations with Poland. Meanwhile, Khanenko's envoys managed to conclude a treaty with the Poles in Ostroh on 2 September 1670. Soon after the Poles recognized his hetmancy, Khanenko and Jan Sobieski launched a massive invasion onto the right bank.

=== War against Poland and Russia ===
In 1672, with a force of 12,000, Doroshenko aided the 100,000-strong Ottoman Army, which invaded Poland and defeated the Polish army at the Battle of Chertvenivka and laid siege to Kamenets (it had been captured and sacked) as well as Lviv. The war ended with the capture of Podolia and the signing of the Peace of Buchach. According to the terms of the treaty, the Podolia Voivodeship was turned into an Ottoman province and the Bratslav Voivodeship and the south of the Kiev Voivodship were to be recognized as Cossack territory administered by Doroshenko under an Ottoman protectorate. However, the war left consequences for Doroshenko, devastating his country. The vast Ukrainian territory was laid waste, cities were burned down, and hundreds of people were taken into captivity by the Crimean Tatars.

Meanwhile, in the summer of 1672, Demian Mnohohrishny was replaced by Ivan Samoylovych at the 1672 Cossack general council near Konotop. As the right bank faced devastation by the Ottoman power, Doroshenko began to lose the respect of his previously loyal civilians because of his collaboration with the "hated infidels." Although the alliance had been an integral part in his successes, the rest of the population suffered at the hands of the Turks. As his forces were weakened from the ongoing wars, Doroshenko was forced to rely increasingly on the Ottomans, which was very unpopular with most of the deeply Orthodox Christian Cossacks. At the 1674 Council of Officers in Pereyaslav (17 March) Samoylovych was proclaimed the Hetman of all Ukraine. However, the title was not in force until Doroshenko would abdicate. In the summer of 1674 Samoylovych, along with the Russian voivode Grigory Romodanovsky, launched an expedition against Doroshenko and besieged Chyhyryn. At that time Mykhailo Khanenko surrendered his title of hetman to Samoylovych in exchange for some land estates. Grand Vizier Kara Mustafa managed to lift the siege and drive the Russian forces beyond the Dnieper.

However, in the fall of 1675 at the Cossack council in Chyhyryn, Doroshenko already abdicated and pledged his allegiance to Russia, with Ivan Sirko witnessing it. However, the Russian government demanded him to abdicate again on the territory of Left-bank Ukraine, and it should be witnessed by Samoylovych and Romodanovsky, the request of which Doroshenko refused. In the fall of 1676, Samoylovych crossed the Dnieper with an army of 30,000 men and once again besieged Chyhyryn. After several hours of battle, Doroshenko asked his 2,000 Serdiuk garrison to lay down their arms as he had decided to abdicate, which he did on 19 September 1676.

Doroshenko was arrested and brought to Moscow, where he was kept in honorary exile, never to return to Ukraine.

== Later years and legacy ==
=== Voivode of Khlynov (Vyatka) ===
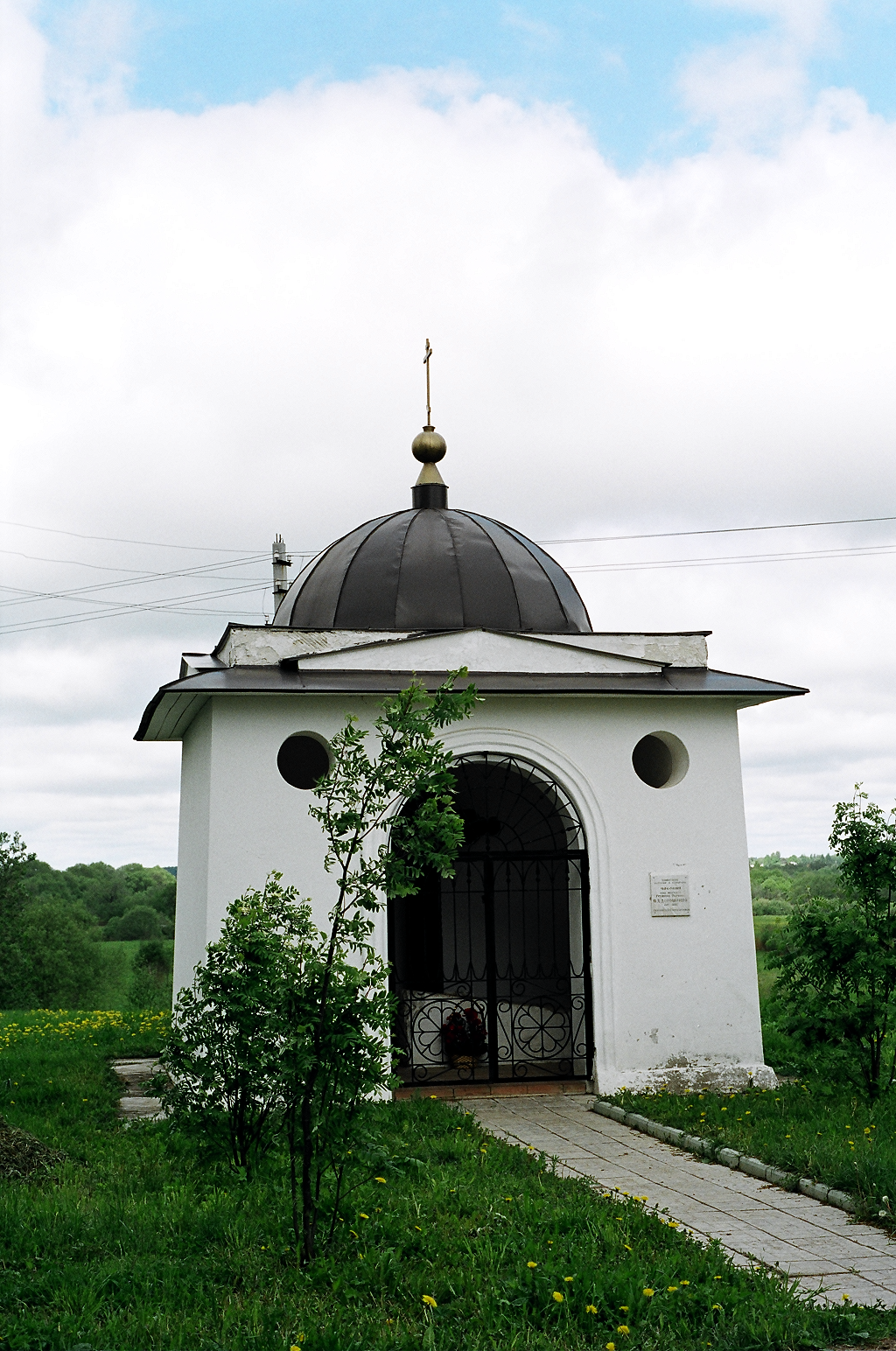
Chapel at the tomb of Doroshenko in Yaropolets, Moscow Oblast

In 1676, Petro Doroshenko asked the new Russian tsar, Feodor III, to forgive him and promised his loyalty. In 1679, he was appointed voyevoda (governor-duke) of Khlynov (Vyatka), in Central Russia, and after a few years, he was granted an estate of Yaropolcha, in Volokolamsk Uyezd. Petro Doroshenko died in 1698 near Volokolamsk.

To this day, he remains a controversial figure in Ukrainian history. Some consider him a national hero who wanted an independent Ukraine, and others consider him as a power-hungry Cossack hetman, who offered Ukraine to a Muslim sultan in exchange for hereditary overlordship of his native land.

=== Descendants ===
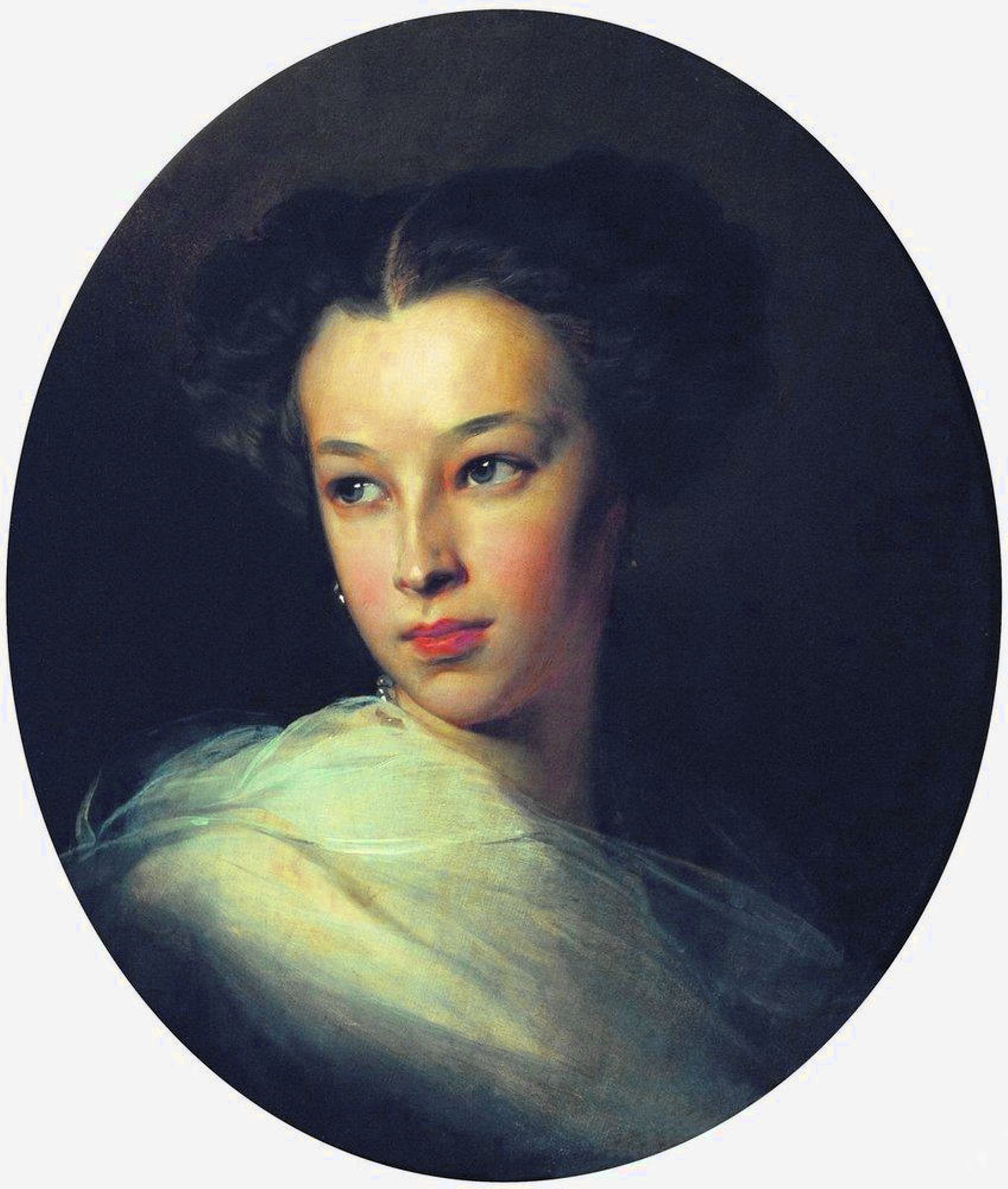
Natalia Pushkina, countess of Merenberg, one of the most charming women of her time, painting, 1849

Among his descendants are Natalia Pushkina, Maria Nirod, and Dmytro Doroshenko. Natalia would marry the poet Alexander Pushkin, and have a daughter named also Natalia, who became the Countess of Merenberg after her marriage to her husband, a Nassau prince. Their descendants subsequently married into, amongst others, the Romanov dynasty and the Westminster and Milford-Haven noble families of Great Britain. Dmytro, on the other hand, was a prominent Ukrainian political figure during the Russian Revolution and a leading Ukrainian emigre historian during the interwar period.

== In culture ==
In 1911, the drama Hetman Doroshenko, with a libretto by Liudmyla Starytska-Cherniakhivska set to the music by Mykola Lysenko, premiered in the Mykola Sadovskyi theatre in Kyiv to rgw great acclaim of the public.

In the 1959 novel Angélique and the King by Anne Golon, Doroshenko serves as an antagonist wholeads a force of Ukrainian Cossacks during a fictional capture of Budapest on the tsar's order.

In 2013, with the support of a museum, Muzei Hetmanstva, the Hetman Petro Doroshenko Fund was created. The fund carries out research activity about Hetmans Mykhailo and Petro Doroshenko, shares information about them and researches the genealogy of the Doroshenko family.

== See also ==
- Reply of the Zaporozhian Cossacks
- Hetmans of Ukrainian Cossacks
