= Ivan Briukhovetsky =

Ukrainian Cossack hetman (1623–1668)

- Іван Брюховецький
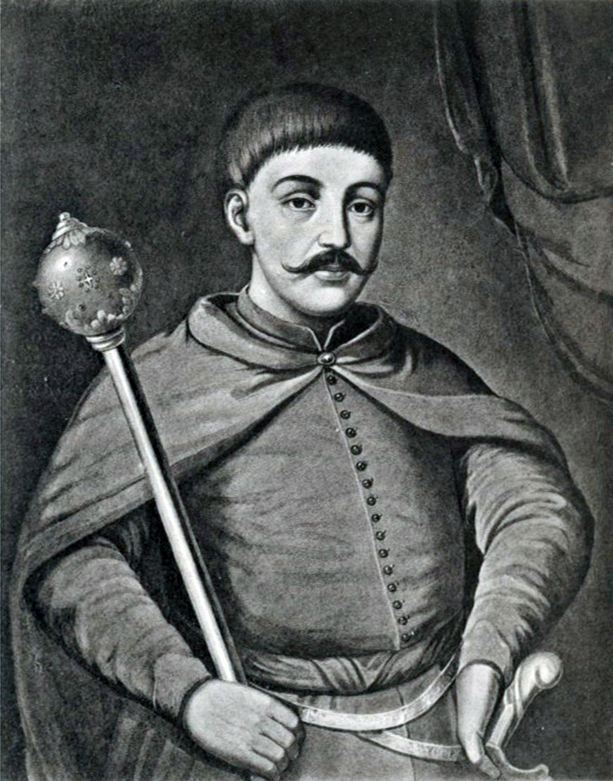
- Portrait, mid-19th century

Hetman of the Zaporozhian Host
- In office 27 June 1663 – 17 June 1668
- Preceded by: Yurii Khmelnytsky
- Succeeded by: Petro Doroshenko

Kish otaman
- In office 1661–1663
- Preceded by: Petro Sukhoviy
- Succeeded by: Satsko Turovets

Personal details
- Born: c. 1623 near Dykanka, Polish–Lithuanian Commonwealth
- Died: 18 June 1668 (age about 44) Budyshchi, Cossack Hetmanate
- Resting place: Epiphany Church, Hadiach
- Spouse: Daria Dolgorukova
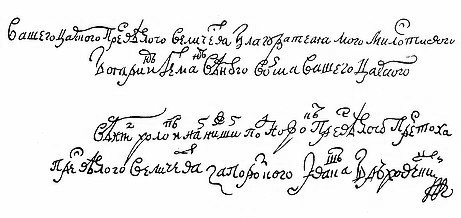
- Signature

Ivan Briukhovetsky (Old Ukrainian: Іванъ Бруховецкий, modern Ukrainian: Іван Брюховецький; Polish: Iwan Brzuchowiecki; Russian: Иван Брюховецкий, romanized: Ivan Bryukhovetskiy; c. 1623 – 18 June 1668) was the hetman of left-bank Ukraine from 1663 to 1668. In the early years of rule, he positioned himself on pro-Russian policies, but later joined a rebellion in an attempt to salvage his reputation and authority. During the anti-Russian uprising in 1668 he was beaten to death by a mob supported by Petro Doroshenko.

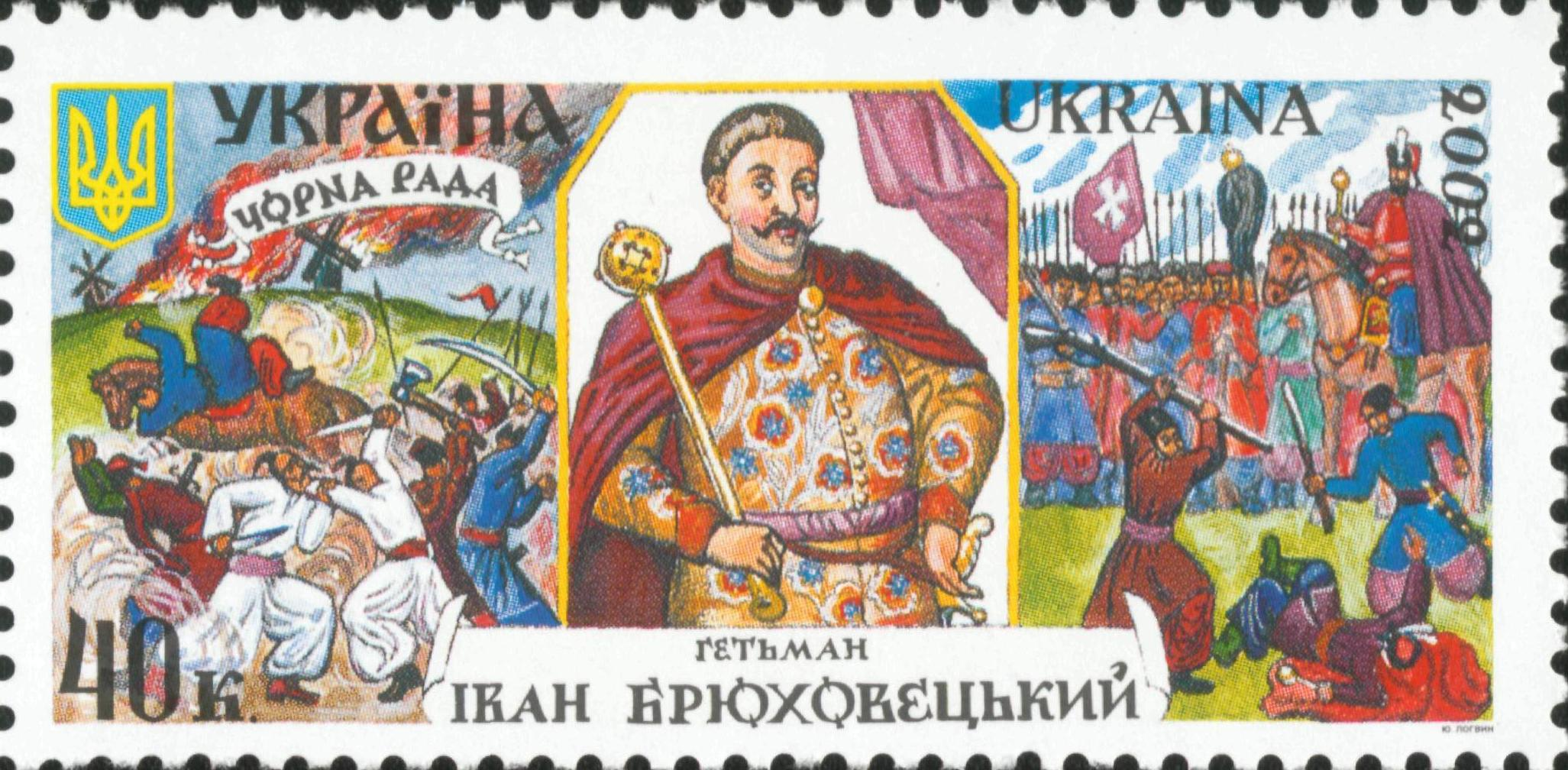
Ukrainian postage stamp depicting the Black Council of 1663, Briukhovetsky and his 1668 execution

== Biography ==
He was a registered Cossack, belonging to the Chyhyryn Regiment. Early in his career, he served as Bohdan Khmelnytsky's courier and diplomatic emissary. He was elected as kish otaman (1661–1663) of the Zaporizhian Sich. At the Black Council of 1663, he was elected as hetman of the Left Bank with the support of Moscow as an alternative to already elected hetman Pavlo Teteria. Briukhovetsky's election was at the roots of the division of the Cossack State which is known in history as the Ruin.

However, Briukhovetsky's reign and cruelty worked against him. Early on, he arrested and executed his opponents, namely polkovniks Yakym Somko and Vasyl Zolotarenko. To gain support, he signed the Moscow Articles of 1665, which placed left-bank Ukraine under the direct control of the tsar. In return, Briukhovetsky secured for himself the title of boyar, properties, and marriage to Prince Vasily Dolgoruky's daughter, Daria. This treaty went on to be called the "Briukhovetsky treaty", and caused a large rebellion in Ukraine. His popularity among the clergy fell when he suggested that Moscow appoint and send a metropolitan to Kyiv.

As his domestic policies failed, Briukhovetsky put the blame on the Russian authorities and sided with the Cossacks' rebellion in an attempt to save his reputation, but it was too late. In 1668, in the town of Budyshche, a Cossack mob, which was led by Petro Doroshenko, killed the hetman by chaining him to a cannon and beating him to death.

After the murder of Briukhovetsky, the Lower Host in revenge tried to kill Doroshenko, and Ivan Sirko initiated the right-bank rebellions.

In Witchcraft in Russia and Ukraine, 1000–1900: A Sourcebook by Christine D. Worobec and Valerie A. Kivelson, the story is told of Hetman Briukhovetsky burning a number of women at the stake as witches because his pregnant wife became ill, which resulted in her miscarriage.
