= List of battles involving the Zaporozhian Cossacks =

The Zaporozhian Cossacks were people who lived beyond the rapids of Dnieper who played an important role in the history of Ukraine. This is the list of battles that involves the Zaporozhian Cossacks and their states, such as the Zaporozhian Sich and the Cossack Hetmanate from XV century until 1775, when Cossack Hetmanate were abolished by the Russian Empress Catherine the Great. This list also includes the battles that involve the Haidamaks, a Ukrainian Cossack paramilitary units that were active in the Right-Bank Ukraine from 1734 to 1768.

== List ==
Cossack victory
Cossack defeat
Another result

| Date | Battle | Modern location | Conflict | Result |
|---|---|---|---|---|
| 1489 | Attack on the Muscovite convoy | near Tavan | Cossack raids into Russia and Muscovite–Lithuanian Wars | Victory |
| 1492 | Raid on Tiahynka | Tiahynka castle, Ottoman Empire | Cossack raids | Victory |
| 1493 | Sack of Ochakiv | Ochakiv, Ottoman Empire | Cossack raids | Victory |
| 1521 | Siege of Pereslavl-Ryazansky | Ryazan | Crimean invasion of Russia (1521) | Defeat |
| 1528 | Ochakiv campaign | Ochakiv, Ottoman Empire | Cossack raids and Crimean–Nogai slave raids in Eastern Europe | Victory |
| 1532 | Siege of Cherkasy | Cherkasy, Right-Bank Ukraine | Crimean–Nogai slave raids in Eastern Europe | Victory |
| 1534 | Battle of Zaslav (1534) | Iziaslav | Crimean–Nogai slave raids in Eastern Europe | Victory |
| 1545 | Raid on Ochakiv | Ochakiv, Ottoman Empire | Cossack raids | Victory |
| 1557–1558 | Tatar attacks on Khortytsia | Zaporozhia | Crimean–Nogai slave raids in Eastern Europe | Victory |
| 1559 | Crimean Campaign (1559) | Crimea | Cossack raids and Russo-Crimean Wars | Victory |
| 1559 | Raid on Islam-Kermen | Islam-Kermen | Cossack raids and the 1559 Crimean campaign | Defeat |
| 1559 | Raid on Ochakiv | Ochakiv | Cossack raids and the 1559 Crimean campaign | Victory |
| 1561 | Battle of Verbia | Dimăcheni | Moldavian Magnate Wars | Victory |
| 1563 | Moldavian campaign of Dmytro Vyshnevetsky | Moldavia | Moldavian Magnate Wars and the 1563 Moldavian noble rebellion | Defeat |
| 1572 | Battle of Molodi | Molodi, 50 km south of Moscow | Russo–Crimean War (1571–1572) | Victory |
| 1574 | Battle of Jiliște | Jiliște, Moldavia | Moldavian campaign (1574) | Victory |
| 1574 | Battle of the Cahul (1574) | Cahul, Moldavia | Moldavian campaign (1574) | Defeat: Death of John the Terrible |
| 1575 | Crimean campaign (1575) | Crimea | Cossack raids | Victory |
| 1577 | Moldavian campaign (1577) | Moldavia | Cossack raids | Victory |
| 1577 | Battle of Iași | Iași, Moldavia | Cossack raids and Pidkova's Moldavian campaign (1577) | Victory: Ivan Pidkova captures Iași |
| 1578 | Wallachian campaign of Yakiv Shah | Wallachia | Cossack raids | Victory |
| 1589 | Crimean campaign | Crimean | Cossack raids | Inconclusive |
| 1591 | Battle of Pereiaslav | Pereiaslav, Left-Bank Ukraine | Kosiński uprising | Victory |
| 1593 | Battle of Piatka | Piatka, now Ukraine | Kosiński uprising | Defeat |
| 1593 | Siege of Cherkasy | Cherkasy, now Ukraine | Kosiński uprising | Defeat |
| 1593–1595 | Moldavian campaigns | Moldavia | Cossack raids and Long Turkish War | Victory |
| 1594 | Siege of Orhei | Orhei | Moldavian campaigns | Victory |
| 1594 | Raid on Tighina | Tighina (Bender), Moldavia | Moldavian campaigns | Victory |
| 1594 | Cossack raid on Podolia | Podolia | Nalyvaiko Uprising | Victory |
| 1595 | Battle of Călugăreni | Călugăreni | Long Turkish War | Victory |
| 1595 | Battle of Giurgiu | Giurgiu | Long Turkish War | Victory |
| 1596 | Battle of Keresztes | Keresztes | Long Turkish War | Defeat |
| 1595–1596 | White Ruthenia campaign | Modern Belarus | Nalyvaiko Uprising | Victory |
| 1596 | Battle of Bila Tserkva | Bila Tserkva, now Ukraine | Nalyvaiko Uprising | Defeat |
| 1596 | Battle of Hostriy Kamin | near Kaniv | Nalyvaiko Uprising | Inconclusive |
| 1596 | Battle of Lubny | near Lubny | Nalyvaiko Uprising | Defeat |
| 1599 | Samiylo Kishka's rebellion | Black Sea | Cossack raids | Victory: Samiylo Kishka returns to Ukraine |
| 1599 | Battle of Mirăslău | Mirăslău | Long Turkish War | Victory |
| 1600 | Battle of Șelimbăr | Șelimbăr | Long Turkish War | Victory |
| 1601 | Battle of Guruslău | Guruslău | Long Turkish War | Defeat |
| 1602 | Cossack raid on Kiliia | Kiliia | Cossack raids | Victory |
| 1602 | Livonian campaign | Livonia | Polish–Swedish War (1600–1611) | Victory |
| 1606 | Raid on Kiliya and Akkerman | Kiliia, Akkerman | Cossack raids | Victory |
| 1606 | Battle of Varna (1606) | Varna, Ottoman Empire | Cossack raids | Victory |
| 1607 | Raid on Ochakiv | Ochakiv | Cossack raids | Victory |
| 1608 | Raid on Perekop | Perekop, Crimea | Cossack raids | Victory |
| 1609 | Raids on Kiliya, Izmail and Akkerman | Kiliia, Izmail, Akkerman | Cossack raids | Victory |
| 1609-1612 | Siege of Smolensk (1609–1611) | Smolensk | Polish–Russian War (1609–1618) | Victory |
| 1612 | Battle of Bila Tserkva | Bila Tserkva | Crimean-Nogai slave raids in Eastern Europe | Victory |
| 1614 | Raid on Trabzon | Trabzon, Ottoman Empire | Cossack raids | Victory |
| 1614 | Raid on Sinop | Sinop, Ottoman Empire | Cossack raids | Victory |
| 1615 | Raid on Istanbul | Istanbul, Ottoman Empire | Cossack raids | Victory: First Cossack raid on the Ottoman capital |
| 1616 | Cossack raid on North Anatolia | Anatolian peninsula | Cossack raids | Victory |
| 1616 | Battle of Samara | Samara | Crimean–Nogai slave raids in Eastern Europe | Victory |
| 1616 | Battle of Kaffa (1616) | Kaffa | Cossack raids | Victory |
| 1617 | Raid on Istanbul | Istanbul, Ottoman Empire | Cossack raids | Victory |
| 1618 | Battle of Yelets | Yelets, Tsardom of Russia | Prince Władysław's March on Moscow | Victory |
| 1618 | Battle of Livny | Livny, Tsardom of Russia | Prince Władysław's March on Moscow | Victory |
| 1618 | Battle of Kolomna | Kolomna, Tsardom of Russia | Prince Władysław's March on Moscow | Victory |
| 1618 | Battle of Donskoy Monastery | Donskoy Monastery, Moscow, Tsardom of Russia | Prince Władysław's March on Moscow | Victory |
| 1618 | Battle of Orynin | Orynin,Podolia | Crimean–Nogai slave raids in Eastern Europe | Defeat |
| 1618 | Siege of Moscow (1618) | Moscow, Tsardom of Russia | Prince Władysław's March on Moscow | Truce of Deulino |
| 1620 | Second raid on Varna | Varna, Ottoman Empire | Cossack raids | Victory |
| 1620 | Raid on Istanbul | Istanbul, Ottoman Empire | Cossack raids | Victory |
| 1621 | Battle of Khotyn (1621) | Khotyn, Principality of Moldavia | Polish–Ottoman War (1620–1621) | Victory: End of the Polish-Ottoman war; Ottoman invasion of the Commonwealth halted |
| 1621 | Raid on Trebizond | Trebizond, Ottoman Empire | Cossack raids | Defeat |
| 1624 | Raid on Istanbul | Istanbul, Ottoman Empire | Cossack raids | Victory |
| 1624 | Crimean campaign (1624) | Crimean Khanate | Ottoman-Crimean-Zaporozhian conflict (1624–1629) | Victory |
| 1624 | Battle of Karasubazar | Karasubazar, Crimean Khanate | Crimean campaign (1624) | Victory |
| 1624 | Crimean-Cossack capture of Kaffa | Kaffa, Ottoman Empire | Crimean campaign (1624) | Victory |
| 1624 | Battle of Martynów | Noviy Martiniv | Crimean–Nogai slave raids in Eastern Europe | Victory |
| 1625 | Battle of Karaharman | Near Karaharman, Black Sea | Cossack raids | Defeat |
| 1625 | Battle of Kurukovo Lake | Kurukovo Lake, now Ukraine | Zhmaylo uprising | Inconclusive |
| 1626 | Battle of Poti (1626) | Poti, now Georgia | Cossack raids | Defeat |
| 1626 | Battle of Bila Tserkva | Bila Tserkva | Crimean-Nogai slave raids in Eastern Europe | Victory |
| 1628 | Crimean campaign | Crimea | Cossack raids | Defeat: Death of Mykhailo Doroshenko |
| 1629 | Battle of Bursztyn | Near Bursztyn Polish-Lithuanian Commonwealth | Cossack raids | Victory |
| 1628 | Battle of the Alma | Alma, Crimean Khanate | Crimean campaign | Victory: Siege of Bakhchysarai lifted |
| 1628 | Battle near Kaffa (1628) | Kaffa, Ottoman Empire | Crimean campaign | Victory |
| 1628 | Siege of Kaffa | Kaffa, Ottoman Empire | Crimean campaign | Defeat |
| 1629 | Raid on Istanbul | Istanbul, Ottoman Empire | Cossack raids | Victory |
| 1630 | Battle of Ochakiv | Ochakiv, Ottoman Empire | Cossack raids | Defeat |
| 1630 | Battle of Korsun | Korsun | Fedorovych uprising | Victory |
| 1630 | Battle of Pereislav (1630) | Pereiaslav | Fedorovych uprising | Treaty of Pereiaslav |
| 1632 | Siege of Dorogobuzh | Dorogobuzh | Smolensk War | Defeat |
| 1632 | Siege of Novhorod-Siverskyi | Novhorod-Siverskyi | Smolensk War | Defeat |
| 1632–1633 | Siege of Smolensk (1632–1633) | Smolensk, Polish-Lithuanian Commonwealth | Smolensk War | Victory |
| 1633 | Sack of Valuyki | Valuyki, Tsardom of Russia | Smolensk War | Victory |
| 1633 | First Siege of Belgorod | Belgorod, Tsardom of Russia | Smolensk War | Defeat |
| 1633 | Siege of Putyvl | Putyvl, Tsardom of Russia | Smolensk War | Defeat |
| 1633 | Battle of Kamianets | Kamianets-Podilskyi | Polish–Ottoman War (1633–1634) | Victory |
| 1634 | Battle of Schelkanovo | Shchelkanovo, Tsardom of Russia | Smolensk War | Victory |
| 1634 | Second Siege of Belgorod | Belgorod, Tsardom of Russia | Smolensk War | Defeat |
| 1635 | Capture of Kodak | Kodak, Zaporozhia | Sulyma uprising | Victory |
| 1635 | Battle of Pillau (1635) | Near Baltiysk | Polish–Swedish conflict (1635) | Victory |
| 1637 | Battle of Cherkasy | Cherkasy, Polish-Lithuanian Commonwealth | Pavliuk uprising | Victory |
| 1637 | Battle of Pereiaslav (1637) | Pereiaslav | Pavliuk uprising | Victory |
| 1637 | Battle of Kumeyki | Kumeyki | Pavliuk uprising | Defeat |
| 1637–1642 | Siege of Azov | Azov, Ottoman Empire | Cossack raids | Military victory: Ottoman-led assaults on Azov were repelled |
| 1638 | Melecki's punitive campaign | Ukraine | Ostryanyn uprising | Victory |
| 1638 | Battle of Hovtva | Hovtva, now Ukraine | Ostryanyn uprising | Victory |
| 1638 | Hunia's raid on Dnieper and Left-Bank Ukraine | Left-bank Ukraine, Dnieper river | Ostryanyn uprising and Cossack raids | Victory |
| 1638 | Battle of Zhovnyn | Zhovnyn | Ostryanyn uprising | Defeat |
| 1638 | Siege on Starzec river | Starzec river | Ostryanyn uprising | Defeat |
| 1639–1642 | Pivtora-Kozhukha insurgency | Zaporozhia, Wild Fields | Aftermath of the Ostryanyn uprising | Defeat |
| 1644 | Battle of Okhmativ (1644) | Okhmativ | Crimean–Nogai slave raids in Eastern Europe | Victory |
| 1646 | Siege of Dunkirk (1646) (disputed (Note: Some historians have claimed before that some Cossack mercenaries had participated in the battle, possibly involving Ivan Sirko or Bohdan Khmelnytsky. However, several historians have countered the idea of any Cossack participation in the battle.)) | Dunkirk, now France | Thirty Years' War and the Eighty Years' War | Victory |
| 1648 | Attack on Khortytsia | Khortytsia island, Zaporozhia | Khmelnytsky Uprising | Victory |
| 1648 | Battle of Zhovti Vody | Zhovti Vody | Khmelnytsky Uprising | Victory |
| 1648 | Battle of Korsuń | Korsun-Shevchenkivskyi | Khmelnytsky Uprising | Victory |
| 1648 | Siege of Kodak | Kodak fortress | Khmelnytsky Uprising | Victory |
| 1648 | Battle of Makhnivka | Makhnivka | Khmelnytsky Uprising | Victory |
| 1648 | Battle of Kostiantyniv | Starokostiantyniv | Khmelnytsky Uprising | Disputed |
| 1648 | Siege of Przemyśl | Przemyśl | Khmelnytsky Uprising | Defeat |
| 1648 | Siege of Stary Bykhaw | Stary Bykhaw | Khmelnytsky Uprising | Defeat |
| 1648 | Siege of Kremenets | Kremenets castle | Khmelnytsky Uprising | Victory |
| 1648 | First Siege of Bar | Bar, now Ukraine | Khmelnytsky Uprising | Victory |
| 1648 | Battle of Pohost | Pohost | Khmelnytsky Uprising | Defeat |
| 1648 | Battle of Slutsk (1648) | Slutsk | Khmelnytsky Uprising | Defeat |
| 1648 | Battle of Pyliavtsi | Pyliavtsi | Khmelnytsky Uprising | Victory |
| 1648 | Siege of Lviv (1648) | Lviv, Polish-Lithuanian Commonwealth | Khmelnytsky Uprising | Cossack forces lift the siege after receiving a ransom |
| 1648 | Siege of Lviv High Castle | Lviv High Castle | Khmelnytsky Uprising | Victory |
| 1648 | Siege of Zamość (1648) | Zamość Fortress | Khmelnytsky Uprising | Cossack withdrawal following the Truce of Zamość. |
| 1648 | Pinsk Uprising | Pinsk | Khmelnytsky Uprising | Defeat |
| 1649 | Second Siege of Bar | Bar, now Ukraine | Khmelnytsky Uprising | Defeat |
| 1649 | Siege of Babruysk | Babruysk | Khmelnytsky Uprising | Defeat |
| 1649 | Battle of Mazyr | Mazyr | Khmelnytsky Uprising | Defeat |
| 1649 | First Battle of Loyew | Loyew, now Belarus | Khmelnytsky Uprising | Defeat |
| 1649 | Battle of Zahal | Zahal | Khmelnytsky Uprising | Defeat |
| 1649 | Battle of Rzeczyca | Rzeczyca | Khmelnytsky Uprising | Defeat |
| 1649 | Siege of Zbarazh | Zbarazh | Khmelnytsky Uprising | Defeat |
| 1649 | Battle of Zboriv | Zboriv | Khmelnytsky Uprising | Treaty of Zboriv: Creation of the Cossack Hetmanate |
| 1649 | Battle of Zaslav (1649) | Iziaslav | Khmelnytsky Uprising | Defeat |
| 1650 | Moldavian campaign | Moldavia | Khmelnytsky Uprising | Victory |
| 1651 | Battle of Krasne | Krasne, | Khmelnytsky Uprising | Defeat |
| 1651 | Siege of Stina (1651) | Stina | Khmelnytsky Uprising | Victory |
| 1651 | Siege of Vinnytsia | Vinnytsia, Cossack Hetmanate | Khmelnytsky Uprising | Victory |
| 1651 | Battle of Lypovets (1651) | Lypovets, Cossack Hetmanate | Khmelnytsky Uprising | Victory |
| 1651 | Battle of Kopychyntsi | Kopychyntsi, Polish-Lithuanian Commonwealth | Khmelnytsky Uprising | Defeat |
| 1651 | Battle of Berestechko | Berestechko, Polish-Lithuanian Commonwealth | Khmelnytsky Uprising | Defeat |
| 1651 | Battle of Blue Waters (1651) | Blue Waters, Cossack Hetmanate | Khmelnytsky Uprising | Victory |
| 1651 | Battle of Loyew (1651) | Loyew, now Belarus | Khmelnytsky Uprising | Defeat |
| 1651 | Capture of Kyiv (1651) | Kyiv, Cossack Hetmanate | Khmelnytsky Uprising | Defeat |
| 1651 | Battle of Taborivka | near Bila Tserkva, Cossack Hetmanate | Khmelnytsky Uprising | Victory |
| 1651 | Battle of Bila Tserkva | Bila Tserkva, Cossack Hetmanate | Khmelnytsky Uprising | Treaty of Bila Tserkva |
| 1652 | Battle of Batih | Batih hill near Ladyzhyn | Khmelnytsky Uprising | Victory |
| 1652 | Siege of Kameniec (1652) | Kameniec Podolski | Khmelnytsky Uprising | Defeat |
| 1652 | Wedding Moldavian campaign | Moldavia | Khmelnytsky Uprising | Victory |
| 1653 | Battle of Monastyryshche | Monastyryshche | Khmelnytsky Uprising | Victory |
| 1653 | Moldavian campaign | Moldavia | Khmelnytsky Uprising | Defeat: Death of Tymofiy Khmelnytsky; End of Cossack attempts to establish their influence in Moldavia |
| 1653 | Battle of Iași | Iași, Moldavia | Moldavian campaign of Tymofiy Khmelnytsky | Victory |
| 1653 | Battle of Focșani (1653) | Focșani | Moldavian campaign of Tymofiy Khmelnytsky | Victory |
| 1653 | Battle of Tecuci | Tecuci | Moldavian campaign of Tymofiy Khmelnytsky | Victory |
| 1653 | Battle of Teleajen (1653) | At Teleajen, Wallachia | Moldavian campaign of Tymofiy Khmelnytsky | Victory |
| 1653 | Battle of Finta | Finta | Moldavian campaign of Tymofiy Khmelnytsky | Defeat |
| 1653 | Siege of Suceava | Suceava, Moldavia | Khmelnytsky Uprising and Moldavian campaign of Tymofiy Khmelnytsky | Defeat |
| 1653 | Siege of Zhvanets | Zhvanets | Khmelnytsky Uprising | Treaty of Zhvanets: End of the alliance between Khmelnytsky and the Crimean Khanate |
| 1654–1655 | Tsar Alexei's campaign | Smolensk, Ukraine, Belarus and Lithuania | Khmelnytsky Uprising and Polish–Russian War | Victory: All of Ukraine up to the San river is seized by the Russo-Cossack army |
| 1654–1655 | Bracław campaign | Podolia | Khmelnytsky Uprising and Polish–Russian War | Victory: Czarniecki's failure despite initial success; Heavy civilian losses in Bratslav |
| 1654–1655 | Zolotarenko's Belarusian campaign | Belarus and parts of Lithuania | Khmelnytsky Uprising, Polish–Russian War and Tsar Alexei's campaign of 1654–1655 | Victory: Cossacks establish their administration in Belarus |
| 1654–1655 | Siege of Stary Bykhaw (1654–1655) | Stary Bykhaw | Polish–Russian War | Defeat |
| 1654 | First siege of Uman | Uman, Cossack Hetmanate | Khmelnytsky Uprising and Polish–Russian War | Victory |
| 1654 | Siege of Gomel | Gomel | Khmelnytsky Uprising and Polish–Russian War | Victory |
| 1654 | Siege of Smolensk (1654) | Smolensk | Khmelnytsky Uprising and Polish–Russian War | Victory |
| 1654 | Siege of Vitebsk (1654) | Vitebsk | Khmelnytsky Uprising and Polish–Russian War | Victory |
| 1654 | Siege of Bratslav | Bratslav, Cossack Hetmanate | Khmelnytsky Uprising and Polish–Russian War | Defeat |
| 1655 | Second siege of Uman | Uman, Cossack Hetmanate | Khmelnytsky Uprising and Polish–Russian War | Victory |
| 1655 | Battle of Okhmativ | Okhmativ | Khmelnytsky Uprising and Polish–Russian War | Disputed |
| 1655 | Siege of Lviv | Lviv | Khmelnytsky Uprising and Polish–Russian War | Russo-Cossack forces lifted siege after receiving ransom |
| 1655 | Battle of Horodok | Horodok near Lviv | Khmelnytsky Uprising and Polish–Russian War | Victory |
| 1655 | Siege of Mogilev | Mogilev | Khmelnytsky Uprising and Polish–Russian War | Victory |
| 1655 | Siege of Lublin (1655) | Lublin | Khmelnytsky Uprising and Polish–Russian War | Victory |
| 1655 | Battle of Vilnius (1655) | Vilnius, Polish-Lithuanian Commonwealth | Polish–Russian War | Victory |
| 1655 | Siege of Slutsk (1655) | Slutsk | Khmelnytsky Uprising and Polish–Russian War | Defeat |
| 1655 | Crimean Blockade | Crimea, Taman | Cossack raids, Sirko's campaigns and Polish–Russian War | Victory |
| 1655 | Battle of Ozerna | Ozerna | Polish–Russian War | Disputed |
| 1657 | Transylvanian campaign into Poland | Poland-Lithuania | The Deluge | Disputed |
| 1657 | Capture of Warsaw | Warsaw, Poland-Lithuania | Transylvanian campaign into Poland (1657) | Victory |
| 1657 | Battle of Magierów | Magierów | Transylvanian campaign into Poland (1657) | Defeat |
| 1657 | Battle of Czarny Ostrów | Czarny Ostrów | Transylvanian campaign into Poland (1657) | Defeat |
| 1657 | Third siege of Uman | Uman | Polish–Russian War | Victory |
| 1657–1658 | Pushkar-Barabash revolt | Left-bank Ukraine | The Ruin | Uprising suppressed |
| 1657–1658 | Clash near Poltava | Poltava | Pushkar-Barabash revolt and The Ruin | Vyhovsky's faction victory |
| 1658–1659 | Muscovite–Ukrainian war (1658–1659) | mainly Left-Bank Ukraine | The Ruin | Vyhovsky defeated by the Cossacks after his victory at Konotop: Signing of the Pereiaslav Articles of 1659 |
| 1658 | Siege of Kyiv | Kyiv, Cossack Hetmanate | Muscovite–Ukrainian war (1658–1659) | Defeat |
| 1658 | Skirmish at Mhlyn | Mhlyn, Cossack Hetmanate (now Mglin, Russia) | Muscovite–Ukrainian war (1658–1659) | Victory |
| 1658 | Battle of Vasylkiv | Vasylkiv, Cossack Hetmanate | Muscovite–Ukrainian war (1658–1659) | Defeat |
| 1658 | Raids on Putyvl uyezd | Villages of Putyvl uyezd | Muscovite–Ukrainian war (1658–1659) | Victory |
| 1658 | Siege of Varva | Varva, Cossack Hetmanate | Polish–Russian War and Muscovite–Ukrainian war (1658–1659) | Russian-led victory |
| 1658 | Sack of Chornukhy | Chornukhy, Cossack Hetmanate | Muscovite–Ukrainian war (1658–1659) | Defeat |
| 1658 | Battle of Sorochyntsi | Sorochyntsi | Muscovite–Ukrainian war (1658–1659) | Victory |
| 1658 | Battle of Myrhorod | Myrhorod | Muscovite–Ukrainian war (1658–1659) | Defeat |
| 1658–1659 | Siege of Mstislavl (1658–1659) | Mstislavl, now Belarus | Muscovite–Ukrainian war (1658–1659) | Defeat |
| 1659 | Vyhovsky's February campaign | Left-bank Ukraine | Muscovite–Ukrainian war (1658–1659) | Victory: Vyhovsky restores control over much of the Left bank |
| 1659 | Battle of Sribne | Sribne, Cossack Hetmanate | Muscovite–Ukrainian war (1658–1659) | Defeat |
| 1659 | Siege of Stary Bykhaw (1659) | Stary Bykhaw, now Belarus | Muscovite–Ukrainian war (1658–1659) | Defeat |
| 1659 | Battle of Nizhyn | Nizhyn, Cossack Hetmanate | Muscovite–Ukrainian war (1658–1659) | Victory |
| 1659 | Siege of Hlukhiv | Hlukhiv, Cossack Hetmanate | Muscovite–Ukrainian war (1658–1659) | Victory |
| 1659 | Battle of Hovtva | Hovtva, now Ukraine | Muscovite–Ukrainian war (1658–1659) | Tatar-led victory |
| 1659 | Siege of Konotop | Konotop | Polish–Russian War and Muscovite–Ukrainian war (1658–1659) | Victory |
| 1659 | Battle of Konotop | near Konotop, now Ukraine | Polish–Russian War and Muscovite–Ukrainian war (1658–1659) | Decisive Vyhovsky's victory |
| 1659 | Sirko's raid on Tatar Horde (1659) | Crimean Khanate | Muscovite–Ukrainian war (1658–1659), Cossack raids and Sirko's campaigns | Victory |
| 1659 | Bohun uprising | Cossack Hetmanate | Muscovite–Ukrainian war (1658–1659) | Russian–Bohun–Sirko victory: Vyhovsky flees to Poland; Yuri Khmelnytsky elected as a new hetman |
| 1659 | Siege of Chyhyryn | Chyhyryn | Muscovite–Ukrainian war (1658–1659) | Khmelnytsky's victory |
| 1659 | Battle of Khmilnyk | Khmilnyk | Polish–Russian War | Russian-led victory |
| 1660 | Ochakiv–Aslan campaign | Northern Ottoman Empire | Sirko's campaigns | Victory |
| 1660 | Battle of Igren | Zaporozhia | Sirko's campaigns | Victory |
| 1660 | Siege of Mohyliv-Podilskyi | Mohyliv-Podilskyi | Polish–Russian War | Russian-led victory |
| 1660 | Battle of Lyubar | Liubar, Ukraine | Polish–Russian War | Polish-led victory |
| 1660 | Battle of Kutyszcze | near Chudniv | Polish–Russian War | Defeat |
| 1660 | Battle of Slobodyshche | Slobodyshche | Polish–Russian War | Inconclusive; Treaty of Chudniv |
| 1660 | Battle of Chudniv | Chudniv | Polish–Russian War | Victory: Yurii Khmelnytsky's Cossacks and Tsytsiura's Cossacks join Vyhovsky's Cossacks on the Polish side and defeat the Russians |
| 1661–1662 | Sieges of Pereiaslav | Pereiaslav, Cossack Hetmanate | Polish–Russian War | Russian-led victory |
| 1662 | Battle of Zhovnyn | Zhovnyn | Polish–Russian War | Russian-led victory |
| 1662 | Battle of Kaniv | Kaniv | Polish–Russian War | Russian-led victory |
| 1662 | Battle of Buzhyn | Buzhyn | Polish–Russian War | Khmelnytsky's coalition victory |
| 1663 | Siege of Perekop | Perekop, Northern Crimea | Cossack raids, Sirko's campaigns and Polish–Russian War | Victory |
| 1663 | Battle of Tsybulnik | Tsybulnik river, Kirovohrad Oblast | Polish–Russian War | Victory |
| 1663–1664 | John Casimir's March on Moscow | Left-Bank Ukraine, Polish-Lithuanian Commonwealth, Tsardom of Russia | Polish–Russian War | Russian-led victory |
| 1663 | Siege of Saltykova Devitsa | Saltykova Devitsa, Chernihiv Oblast | Polish–Russian War | Polish-led victory |
| 1664 | Siege of Hlukhiv | Hlukhiv, Cossack Hetmanate | Polish–Russian War | Victory |
| 1664 | Battle of Pyrohivka | near Pyrohivka | Polish–Russian War | Disputed |
| 1664 | Battle of Voronizh | Voronizh, Cossack Hetmanate | Polish–Russian War | Victory |
| 1664 | Siege of Olkhovets | Olkhovets | Polish–Russian War and Right-Bank Uprising | Siege lifted |
| 1664 | Siege of Buzhyn | Buzhyn, Right-Bank Ukraine | Polish–Russian War and Right-Bank Uprising | Victory |
| 1664 | Siege of Medvyn | Medvyn, Kyiv Oblast | Polish–Russian War (1654–1667) and Right-Bank Uprising | Russian-led victory |
| 1664 | Siege of Lysianka (1664) | Lysianka | Polish–Russian War (1654–1667) and Right-Bank Uprising | Victory |
| 1664 | Battle of Pavoloch | Pavoloch | Polish–Russian War (1654–1667) and Right-Bank Uprising | Inconclusive |
| 1664 | Siege of Cherkasy | Cherkasy | Polish–Russian War (1654–1667) and Right-Bank Uprising | Inconclusive |
| 1664 | Battle of Kapustyana Dolyna | Kapustyana Dolyna, Right-Bank Ukraine | Polish–Russian War and Right-Bank Uprising | Victory (Note: Brother of Sirko was killed, but the Cossacks won the battle overall.) |
| 1664 | Raid on Budjak Horde | Budjak | Cossack raids and Sirko's campaigns | Victory |
| 1664 | Battle of Saradzhin | Saradzhin forest, Right-Bank Ukraine | Polish–Russian War and Right-Bank Uprising | Disputed |
| 1664 | Crimean campaigns (1664) | Crimea, Crimean Khanate | Cossack raids and Sirko's campaigns | Victory |
| 1664 | Storming of Korsun (1664) | Korsun | Polish–Russian War | Indecisive |
| 1664–1665 | Battles of Stavishche | Stavyshche, Right-Bank Ukraine | Polish–Russian War and Right-Bank Uprising | Defeat |
| 1665 | Battle of Bila Tserkva | Bila Tserkva, Right-Bank Ukraine | Polish–Russian War | Victory |
| 1665-1666 | Sirko's raids on Crimean Khanate | Balakliia, Perekop, Ochakiv | Cossack raids, Sirko's campaigns | Victory (Note: Cossacks defeated Crimean troops at Balakliia and raided Perekop and Ochakiv.) |
| 1666 | Pereiaslav revolt | Pereiaslav regiment, Left-Bank Ukraine | Polish–Russian War | Revolt suppressed |
| 1666 | Battle of Helmyazivka | Helmyazivka | Pereiaslav revolt | Inconclusive |
| 1666 | Battle of Brailov | near Brailiv | Polish–Cossack–Tatar War | Decisive victory: Beginning of the Polish–Cossack–Tatar War |
| 1667 | Doroshenko's western campaign | Right-Bank Ukraine, Ruthenian Voivodeship | Polish–Cossack–Tatar War | Defeat |
| 1667 | Siege of Chyhyryn Castle | Chyhyryn, Right-Bank Ukraine | Polish–Cossack–Tatar War | Victory |
| 1667 | Crimean campaign (1667) | Crimea, Crimean Khanate | Polish–Cossack–Tatar War, Cossack raids and Sirko's campaigns | Victory |
| 1667 | Battle of Podhajce | Podhajce, Ruthenian Voivodeship | Polish–Cossack–Tatar War | Defeat: Treaty of Podhajce |
| 1668 | Campaign against the Russian garrisons | Left-bank Ukraine Cossack Hetmanate | Left-Bank Uprising | Victory |
| 1668 | Siege of Chernigov | Chernihiv, Cossack Hetmanate | Left-Bank Uprising | Defeat |
| 1668 | Siege of Pereiaslav | Pereiaslav, Cossack Hetmanate | Left-Bank Uprising | Defeat |
| 1668 | Sloboda–Dnieper campaign | Sloboda, Dnieper Ukraine | The Ruin, Left-Bank Uprising and Sirko's campaigns | Inconclusive |
| 1668 | Battle of Kotelva | Kotelva, Cossack Hetmanate | Left-Bank Uprising | Victory |
| 1668 | Siege of Pochep | Pochep | Left-Bank Uprising | Victory |
| 1668 | Sieges of Hlukhiv (1668) | Left-bank Ukraine Cossack Hetmanate | Left-Bank Uprising | Victory |
| 1668 | Doroshenko's invasion of Left-Bank Ukraine | Left-Bank Ukraine | The Ruin and Left-Bank Uprising | Disputed: Doroshenko temporarily unifies the Hetmanate and withdraws following the Polish invasion of Podolia |
| 1668 | Battle of Khukhra | near Khukhra, Cossack Hetmanate | Left-Bank Uprising | Victory |
| 1668 | Crimean campaigns (1668) | Crimea, Crimean Khanate | The Ruin, Cossack raids and Sirko's campaigns | Victory |
| 1668 | Battle of Sevsk | Sevsk, Tsardom of Russia | Left-Bank Uprising | Defeat |
| 1668 | Battle of Sednev | Sednev, Cossack Hetmanate | Left-Bank Uprising | Defeat |
| 1668 | Battle of Gaivoron | Gaivoron, Cossack Hetmanate | Left-Bank Uprising | Victory |
| 1668 | Battle of Konotop (1668) | Konotop, Cossack Hetmanate | Left-Bank Uprising | Defeat |
| 1668–1669 | Siege of Chyhyryn | Chyhyryn, Cossack Hetmanate | The Ruin | Doroshenko-Sirko victory |
| 1669 | Battle of Stebliv | Stebliv, Cossack Hetmanate | The Ruin | Doroshenko-Sirko-Lyzohub victory |
| 1670 | Siege of Ochakiv | Ochakiv, Ottoman Empire | Cossack raids and Sirko's campaigns | Victory |
| 1671 | Battle of Bratslav | Bratslav, Cossack Hetmanate | Polish–Cossack–Tatar War | Defeat |
| 1671 | Battle of Kalnyk | Kalnyk, Cossack Hetmanate | Polish–Cossack–Tatar War | Polish-Cossack victory in a battle Cossack-Tatar victory in a siege |
| 1672 | Expedition to Wallachia | Wallachia | Cossack raids | Victory |
| 1672 | Battle of Kuialnyk | Velykyi Kuialnyk | Cossack raids and Sirko's campaigns | Victory |
| 1672 | Battle of Ladyzhyn | Ladyzhyn, Cossack Hetmanate | Polish–Ottoman War (1672–1676) and The Ruin | Khanenko victory |
| 1672 | Siege of Kameniec | Kamianets, Polish-Lithuanian Commonwealth | Polish–Ottoman War (1672–1676) | Victory |
| 1672 | Siege of Uman | Uman, Right-Bank Ukraine | Polish–Ottoman War (1672–1676) | Ottoman-Doroshenko victory |
| 1672 | Siege of Lwów | Lwów, Polish-Lithuanian Commonwealth | Polish–Ottoman War (1672–1676) | Ottoman-led forces retreat after receiving a ransom |
| 1672 | John Sobieski's trip to Tatar forces | Podolia, Pokuttia | Polish–Ottoman War (1672–1676) and Crimean-Nogai slave raids in Eastern Europe | Defeat |
| 1672 | Battle of Krasnobród | Krasnobród, Polish-Lithuanian Commonwealth | Polish–Ottoman War (1672–1676) | Victory |
| 1672 | Battle of Komarno | Komarno, Polish-Lithuanian Commonwealth | Polish–Ottoman War (1672–1676) | Defeat |
| 1673 | Uman Uprising | Uman, Right-Bank Ukraine | Polish–Ottoman War (1672–1676) | Insurgent victory |
| 1673 | Sirko's Eastern Campaign | Crimea, Budjak, Ottoman Empire | Cossack raids and Sirko's campaigns | Victory |
| 1674 | Right-Bank Campaign | Right-Bank Ukraine | Russo-Turkish War (1672–1681) | Samoilovich temporarily seizes most of the Right-Bank |
| 1674 | Battle of Lysianka | Lysianka | Russo-Turkish War (1672–1681) | Russian-led victory |
| 1674 | Chyhyryn Campaign (1674) | Right-Bank Ukraine | Russo-Turkish War (1672–1681) | Ottoman victory |
| 1674 | Battles of Ladyzhyn (1674) | Ladyzhyn, Right-Bank Ukraine | Chyhyryn Campaign (1674) and Russo-Turkish War (1672–1681) | Defeat |
| 1674 | Siege of Uman (1674) | Uman, Right-Bank Ukraine | Chyhyryn Campaign (1674) and Russo-Turkish War (1672–1681) | Defeat |
| 1674 | Battle of Rusawa | Rusawa | Russo-Turkish War (1672–1681) | Victory |
| 1674 | Battle of Sich (1674) | Zaporozhia | Russo-Turkish War (1672–1681) and Sirko's campaigns | Victory |
| 1675 | Ottoman Campaign in Poland | Poland-Lithuania | Polish–Ottoman War (1672–1676) | Victory |
| 1675 | Crimean campaign (1675) | Crimea, Crimean Khanate | Russo-Turkish War (1672–1681), Cossack raids and Sirko's campaigns | Victory |
| 1675 | Battle of Mankivka | Mankivka, Right-bank Ukraine | Russo-Turkish War (1672–1681), Crimean–Nogai slave raids in Eastern Europe and Sirko's campaigns | Victory |
| 1675 | Capture of Bakhchysarai | Bakhchysarai, Crimean Khanate | Russo-Turkish War (1672–1681), Cossack raids and Sirko's campaigns | Victory |
| 1676 | Chyhyryn campaign (1676) | Chyhyryn, Right-Bank Ukraine | Russo-Turkish War (1672–1681) | Russian-Samoylovych victory: Abdication of Petro Doroshenko |
| 1677 | Battle of Buzhyn (1677) | Buzhyn | Russo-Turkish War (1672–1681) | Victory |
| 1677 | Chyhyryn campaign (1677) | Chyhyryn, Right-Bank Ukraine | Russo-Turkish War (1672–1681) | Victory |
| 1678 | Chyhyryn Campaign (1678) | Chyhyryn, Right-bank Ukraine | Russo-Turkish War (1672–1681) and Sirko's campaigns | Disputed |
| 1678–1679 | Great Expulsion (Ukraine) | Right-bank Ukraine, sometimes Left-Bank Ukraine | Russo-Turkish War (1672–1681) | Although this was not a military conflict nor a battle, there were several skirmishes that took place between the Left-bank Cossacks of Ivan Samoylovych, supported by the Russian Tsardom, and the Right-bank Cossacks of Yuri Khmelnytsky, supported by the Ottoman Empire and the Crimean Khanate. |
| 1679 | Crimean campaign (1679) | Crimea, Crimean Khanate | Russo-Turkish War (1672–1681), Cossack raids and Sirko's campaigns | Victory |
| 1679 | Stand on the Sich (1679) | Chortomlyk Sich | Russo-Turkish War (1672–1681) and Sirko's campaigns | Victory: End of Sirko's conflict with Ottomans |
| 1683 | Battle of Vienna | Vienna, Austria | Great Turkish War | Victory: Beginning of the Great Turkish War |
| 1683–1684 | Kunicki's campaign | Right-bank Ukraine, Moldavia | Polish–Ottoman War (1683–1699) and Great Turkish War | Mixed results: Cossack victory in the Right-bank Ukraine; Ottoman victory in Moldavia |
| 1683 | Capture of Nemyriv | Nemyriv | Polish–Ottoman War (1683–1699), Great Turkish War and Kunicki's campaign | Victory |
| 1683 | Battle of Chițcani | Chițcani, Moldavia | Polish–Ottoman War (1683–1699), Great Turkish War and Kunicki's campaign | Victory |
| 1684 | Battle of Reni | Reni, Ottoman Empire | Polish–Ottoman War (1683–1699), Great Turkish War and Kunicki's campaign | Defeat |
| 1684–1691 | Moldavian campaign (1684–1691) | Moldavia | Polish–Ottoman War (1683–1699) and Great Turkish War | Defeat |
| 1684–1685 | Battles of Nemyriv | Nemyriv | Polish–Ottoman War (1683–1699) and Great Turkish War | Polish-Lithuanian-Mohyla Cossacks victory |
| 1684 | Battle of Studenytsia | Studenytsia, now Ukraine | Polish–Ottoman War (1683–1699) and Great Turkish War | Defeat |
| 1684 | Battle of Skala | Skala-Podilska, now Ukraine | Polish–Ottoman War (1683–1699) and Great Turkish War | Victory |
| 1687 | Crimean campaign | Crimea | Russo-Turkish War (1686–1700) | Defeat |
| 1688 | Tatar attacks on Nemyriv | Nemyriv | Polish–Ottoman War (1683–1699) and Great Turkish War | Victory |
| 1689 | Crimean campaign | Crimea | Russo-Turkish War (1686–1700) | Defeat |
| 1690, 1693, 1695 | Tatar attacks on Fastiv | Fastiv | Polish–Ottoman War (1683–1699) and Great Turkish War | Victory |
| 1693 | Campaign to Tiahynka | Tiahynka castle | Polish–Ottoman War (1683–1699) | Victory |
| 1695 | First Azov campaign | Azov fortress | Russo-Turkish War (1686–1700) and Great Turkish War | Defeat |
| 1695 | Russian raid to the lower reaches of Dnieper | Gazi-Kerman, Islam-Kerman, Tagan, Tavan | Russo-Turkish War (1686–1700) and Great Turkish War | Victory |
| 1696 | Second Azov campaign | Azov fortress | Russo-Turkish War (1686–1700) and Great Turkish War | Victory |
| 1702 | Battle of Berdychiv (1702) | Berdychiv, Right-bank Ukraine | Paliy uprising | Victory |
| 1702 | Siege of Bila Tserkva | Bila Tserkva, Right-bank Ukraine | Paliy uprising | Victory |
| 1703 | Battle of Verbka | Verbka near Letychiv, Right-bank Ukraine | Paliy uprising | Defeat |
| 1703 | Battle of Ladyzhyn | Ladyzhyn, Right-bank Ukraine | Paliy uprising | Defeat |
| 1704–1705 | Mazepa's Western Ukraine campaign | Right-bank Ukraine | Paliy uprising | Mazepa captures all of Right-Bank and becomes a de-facto hetman of both sides of the Dnieper until 1708 |
| 1705–1706 | Campaign of Grodno | Polish–Lithuanian Commonwealth | Great Northern War | Defeat |
| 1707 | Battle of Shulhynka | Donbas | Bulavin Rebellion | Victory |
| 1708 | Battle of Lesnaya | Lesnaya, Polish–Lithuanian Commonwealth | Great Northern War | Victory |
| 1708 | Sack of Baturyn | Baturyn, Cossack Hetmanate | Great Northern War | Defeat: Massacre of the city |
| 1708 | Battle of Bila Tserkva (1708) | Bila Tserkva, Right-Bank Ukraine | Great Northern War | Defeat |
| 1708 | Battle of Hadiach | Hadiach, Cossack Hetmanate | Great Northern War | Victory |
| 1708 | Battle of Tor | Kryva Luka near Sloviansk | Bulavin Rebellion | Defeat |
| 1709 | Siege of Vepryk | Hadiach, Cossack Hetmanate | Great Northern War | Swedish and Mazepa's Cossacks victory |
| 1709 | Destruction of the Chortomlyk Sich | Chortomlyk Sich | Great Northern War | Defeat |
| 1709 | Battle of Tsarychanka (1709) | Hadiach, Cossack Hetmanate | Great Northern War | Victory |
| 1709 | Battle of Sokilka | Cossack Hetmanate | Great Northern War | Both sides claim victory |
| 1709 | Siege of Poltava | Poltava, Cossack Hetmanate | Great Northern War | Russian-led victory |
| 1709 | Battle of Poltava | Poltava, Cossack Hetmanate | Great Northern War | Russian key victory |
| 1711 | Crimean campaign | Crimea | Russo-Turkish War (1710–1713) | Defeat |
| 1711 | Pylyp Orlyk's march | Right-bank Ukraine | Great Northern War and Russo-Turkish War (1710–1713) | Russian and Skoropadsky's Cossacks victory |
| 1711 | Battle of Lysianka | Lysianka, Right-Bank Ukraine | Great Northern War and Pylyp Orlyk's march | Orlyk's victory |
| 1711 | Siege of Bila Tserkva | Bila Tserkva, Right-bank Ukraine | Great Northern War and Pylyp Orlyk's march | Russian-Skoropadsky's Cossacks victory |
| 1722–1723 | Derbent campaign | Persia | Russo-Persian War (1722–1723) | Victory |
| 1734–1738 | Verlan's revolt | Right-Bank Ukraine, Podolia, Galicia | Haidamak uprisings | Defeat |
| 1734 | Raid on Vinnytsia | Vinnytsia, Right-Bank Ukraine | Verlan's revolt | Victory |
| 1734 | Battle of Zhvanets | Zhvanets, Podolia | Verlan's revolt | Victory |
| 1734 | Attack on Kamenets | Kameniec, Polish-Lithuanian Commonwealth | Verlan's revolt | Defeat |
| 1736 | Siege of Azov | Azov, Ottoman Empire | Russo-Austro-Turkish war | Victory |
| 1736 | Battle of Pavoloch | Pavoloch, Polish-Lithuanian Commonwealth | Verlan's revolt | Victory |
| 1737 | Lacy's campaign | Crimea | Russo-Austro-Turkish war | Victory |
| 1737 | Siege of Ochakiv | Ochakiv, Ottoman Empire | Russo-Austro-Turkish war | Victory |
| 1739 | Battle of Stavuchany | Stavuchany | Russo-Austro-Turkish war | Victory |
| 1749 | Attack on Fastiv | Fastiv | Haidamak uprisings | Victory |
| 1750 | 1750 Haidamak revolt | Right-Bank Ukraine | Haidamak uprisings | Suppressed by the Russians and Cossacks from Left-Bank Ukraine |
| 1750 | Battle of Stayki | Stayki, Right-Bank Ukraine | 1750 Haidamak revolt | Defeat |
| 1768 | Capture of Zhabotyn | Zhabotyn, Polish-Lithuanian Commonwealth | Koliivshchyna | Victory |
| 1768 | First battle of Paliyeve Ozero | Paliyeve Ozero, Polish-Lithuanian Commonwealth | Koliivshchyna | Victory |
| 1768 | Second battle of Paliyeve Ozero | Paliyeve Ozero, Polish-Lithuanian Commonwealth | Koliivshchyna | Defeat |
| 1768 | Raid on Balta | Balta, Ottoman Empire | Koliivshchyna | Victory |
| 1768 | Siege of Uman | Uman, Polish-Lithuanian Commonwealth | Koliivshchyna | Victory: Massacre of the city |
| 1768 | Battle of Bila Tserkva | Bila Tserkva, Polish-Lithuanian Commonwealth | Russian intervention in the Koliivshchyna | Defeat |
| 1768 | 1768 Zaporizhian Sich revolt | Nova Sich | Koliivshchyna and Russo-Turkish War | Revolt suppressed |
| 1769 | Raids on Kinburn | Kinburn Spit, now Ukraine | Russo-Turkish War and Cossack raids | Victory |
| 1769 | Raid on Hacı-Hassan | Hacı-Hassan, near Ochakiv | Russo-Turkish War and Cossack raids | Victory |
| 1770 | Battle of Larga | Larga river, Moldavia | Russo-Turkish War | Victory |
| 1770 | Battle of Kagul | Kagul lake, now Ukraine and Moldova | Russo-Turkish War | Victory |
| 1771 | Siege of Kinburn | Kinburn spit, now Ukraine | Russo-Turkish War | Victory |
| 1771 | Battle of Perekop | Perekop, Northern Crimea | Russo-Turkish War | Victory |
| 1775 | Capture of the Zaporozhian Sich | Nova Sich | Aftermath of the Russo-Turkish War | Defeat: Final dissolution of the Zaporozhian Sich; Petro Kalnyshevsky and high-ranking starshyna members exiled to Siberia; Zaporozhian lands partitioned between the two Russian governorates |

== See also ==
- List of battles of the Khmelnytsky Uprising (1648–1657)
- List of battles of the Polish–Russian War (1654–1667)
- List of battles of the Great Northern War § Northern War in Ukraine (1700–1713)

== Bibliography ==
- Paly, Alexander (2017). Історія України [History of Ukraine] (in Ukrainian). Vol. 3. Kyiv: К.І.С. ISBN 978-617-684-166-1.
- Doroshenko, Dmytro (1939). History of the Ukraine. A. Vansovich.
- Курбатов, Олег (2019). Русско-польская война 1654–1667 гг (in Russian). Runivers. ISBN 978-5905719196.
- Коляда, І.А. (2012). Отаман Сірко (in Ukrainian). Kharkiv: Folio. ISBN 978-966-03-5804-1.
