= White Ruthenia campaign =

White Ruthenia Campaign
- Part of Nalyvaiko uprising
Date	October 1595 – February 1596
Location	Territories of modern Belarus (then Polish–Lithuanian Commonwealth)
Result	Cossack victory

Belligerents
Zaporozhian Cossacks; Local insurgents	Polish–Lithuanian Commonwealth

Commanders and leaders
Severyn Nalyvaiko; Local leaders: Matiusha; Holyi	Mikołaj Krzysztof Radziwiłł; Teodor Skumin Tyszkiewicz; Michał Buywid

Strength
1,000 to 3,000 Cossacks and peasants	Unknown

Casualties and losses
Unknown	At least 19 cannons captured
- Heavy civilian casualties in Mogilev

The White Ruthenia campaign or the raid on White Ruthenia (Ukrainian: Білоруський рейд Наливайка) was a major raid carried out by rebellious Zaporozhian Cossacks led by Severyn Nalyvaiko against the Polish-Lithuanian Commonwealth as a part of Nalyvaiko uprising on the territories of what is now Belarus. The raid resulted with a seizure of large parts of White Ruthenia by the Cossacks, supported by local rebellious peasants and their withdrawal in early 1596.

== Background ==
In 1593, to help the Holy Roman Empire in its war with the Ottomans, the Cossacks had invaded Moldavia in 1593 and occupied it by the end of 1594. At the same time, Cossacks who were returning from the campaigns in Moldavia, invaded Podolia and pillaged several towns, including Bar and Bratslav, thus beginning a new Cossack uprising. As of spring of 1595, most of the Nalyvaiko's insurgents were stationed in Podolia, where several clashes between the peasants and the szlachta took place. In May 1595, Cossacks again went to war with Ottoman forces in Hungary and Transylvania, while the clashes in Ukraine had intensified. At the same time, the Polish-Lithuanian army led by Jan Zamoyski invaded Moldavia. Due to not being able to return to Podolia through Moldavia, Nalyvaiko decided to go through Galicia to Volhynia, which would give him an opportunity to unite the disorganised insurgent units there and launch a major revolt there before the Polish army returns from their campaign in Moldavia. Meanwhile, the situation intensified due to the fact that Zamoyski had prohibited any Cossack raids on Moldavian territory, which became a joint Ottoman-Polish protectorate following the battle of Cecora, refused any assistance from Nalyvaiko and allowed the Polish army to capture his camps. In October 1595, main Nalyvaiko's forces entered Volhynia and stationed in Lutsk, which was pillaged by them. From Volhynia he later launched his raid into Belarus.

== Campaign ==
Not having enough forces to fight the upcoming Polish army, in late October of 1595, Nalyvaiko headed from Volhynia to Polesia. Learning about the events in Ukraine, a large antifeudal movement rose up in the southern regions of what is now Belarus. Nalyvaiko's Cossacks gained support from local Ruthenian insurgents, which allowed him to stay in White Ruthenia for a relatively long time. At the beginning of November, Cossacks captured Slutsk, where they seized a lot of ammunition. Lithuanian nobility managed to organise local defence units to stop the Cossack offensive and to prevent the Belarusian peasants from joining his army. On 25 November, Cossacks were defeated by the Lithuanian forces led by Hieronim Chodkiewicz at Kapyl and were forced to retreat back to Slutsk. To push back the insurgents, Mikołaj Radziwiłł formed an army of approximately 2,000 men that was aimed to push the Cossacks from Slutsk. Nalyvaiko found out about the upcoming Polish-Lithuanian army and organised a defence, which turned out to be successful – Crown forces were defeated and forced to retreat. In November–December, Nalyvaiko's Cossacks and local insurgents were raiding territories near Brest and Babruysk, where they sometimes used partisan warfare. At the same time, in December, Cossacks of the Zaporozhian Hetman Hryhoriy Loboda were active in Polesia.

=== Capture of Mogilev ===
In mid-December Nalyvaiko's army to avoid the main Polish forces, which were stationed in Minsk, headed to Mogilev, which was one of the biggest cities in the Grand Duchy of Lithuania at the time. Crown Army organised a defence inside the Mogilev castle, which eventually fell. The city came out under Cossack control and was later sacked. In response to the capture of Mogilev, Crown forces led by Michał Buywid were sent to seize Mogilev from Cossacks. A battle took place, the result of which is disputed. According to Radziwill's letter to the Polish king Sigismund Vasa, Nalyvaiko sacked the city and left it on 22 of December. The Nalyvaiko's involvement in the fire in Mogilev is disputed. According to Joachim Bielski, the city was sacked by the Crown Forces to force the Cossacks to retreat.

== Aftermath ==
Following the battle in Mogilev, Nalyvaiko and the Cossacks went down to Rzeczyca, where they stayed for some time. While being in Rzeczyca, Nalyvaiko sent the "terms" (Ukrainian: Кондиції) to Sigismund Vasa, in which he proposed a resolution of the "Cossack question". The raid was successful – Nalyvaiko's Cossacks captured at least 19 cannons on the territory of Belarus and then moved to the Southern Ruthenian lands. The campaign in Belarus was initially considered by the Russian government as an attempt of the Cossacks to break through the Lithuanian territory to Russia, possibly to Chernigov or Smolensk. Following the return to Ukraine, Nalyvaiko's army caught up with the units of Matviy Shaula and Hryhoriy Loboda, the united army was, however, defeated by the forces of Stanisław Żółkiewski at Bila Tserkva and then at Lubny, which brought an end to the Nalyvaiko uprising.

== Bibliography ==
- Lepyavko, S.A. (1996). Козацькі війни кінця XVI ст. в Україні (PDF). Chernihiv: Сіверянська думка.
- Myshko, D.I. (1962). Северин Наливайко (PDF). Kyiv: Радянська школа.
