= Stavchany =

Stavchany (Ukrainian: Ставчани) may refer to the following places in Ukraine:

- Stavchany, Chernivtsi Raion, Chernivtsi Oblast, village in Chernivtsi Raion
- Stavchany, Dniester Raion, Chernivtsi Oblast, village in Dniester Raion
- Stavchany, Khmelnytskyi Oblast, village in Kamianets-Podilskyi Raion
- Stavchany, Lviv Oblast, village in Lviv Raion

== See also ==
- Stăuceni (disambiguation), Romanian equivalent
