= Battle of Bila Tserkva =

Battle of Bila Tserkva (or of Biała Cerkiew) may refer to:

- Battle of Bila Tserkva (1596)
- Battle of Bila Tserkva (1626)
- Battle of Bila Tserkva (1651)
