= Battle of Iași (1653) =

- Part of the Moldavian campaign during the Khmelnytsky Uprising
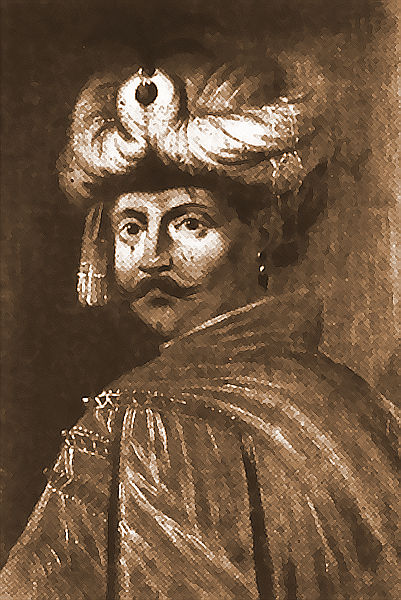
- Tymofiy Khmelnytsky
Date	1 May 1653
Location	Popricani near Iași
Result	Cossack–Tatar victory

Belligerents
Wallachia; Moldavia	Cossack Hetmanate; Crimean Khanate

Commanders and leaders
(Moldavia) Gheorghe Ștefan (Wallachia) John Kemény	Tymofiy Khmelnytsky

Strength
10,000–20,000; 6 department	13,000; 11 department

Casualties and losses
Heavy	Unknown

The Battle of Iași took place on May 1, 1653, during Moldavian campaign of Tymofiy Khmelnytsky. In April 1653, the Cossack-Tatar corps led by Tymofiy Khmelnytsky entered the territory of Moldova to return the lost throne of the principality to his father-in-law Vasile Lupu.

== Battle ==
In April 1653, a Cossack-Tatar corps led by Timofey Khmelnytsky entered Moldavia . By April 28, the Cossacks had crossed the Dnieper, devastating Moldavia. After crossing the Prut, the Cossack troops encountered Moldavian-Transylvanian forces led by Gheorghe Ștefan, who had taken up positions near the town of Popricani on the Zizja (Jijia) River. Stephen's forces numbered between 10,000 and 20,000 soldiers, and included Moldavians, Transylvanians, Hungarians, Germans, Vlachs, and Greeks, as well as civilians from Jassy. The Cossack-Tatar forces numbered about 13,000 men. A battle took place on May 1.

The clash began with an attack by the Moldavian cavalry, which attacked the Cossack camp on the left bank of the Zizja River. Then the Moldavians fired at the enemy with 6 cannons and small arms. The Cossacks responded with 11 cannons, and then, having formed a battle formation in front of the camp, attacked the Moldavians, cutting them down in a sabre fight. At the same time, the Cossack artillery dispersed the remaining Moldavian forces. At that time, the troops of George Stephen fled, pursued by the Cossacks. After the defeat of the Moldavians and the crossing of the Cossacks to the other side of the river, the Moldavian-Transylvanian troops withdrew to Iași. The defeat at Popricani caused a decline in morale in the army's ranks, desertions and the return of soldiers to their homes. Stephen's army withdrew to Transylvania.
