= Stăuceni =

Stăuceni may refer to:

- Stăuceni, Chișinău, a commune in Chișinău municipality, Moldova
- Stăuceni, Botoșani, a commune in Botoșani County, Romania

== See also ==
- Stavchany, Ukrainian spelling of Stăuceni
