= Skirmish at Mhlyn =

1658 skirmish between Russians and Cossacks during the Polish-Russian war

- Part of the Polish-Russian War (1654–1667) and The Ruin (Ukrainian history)
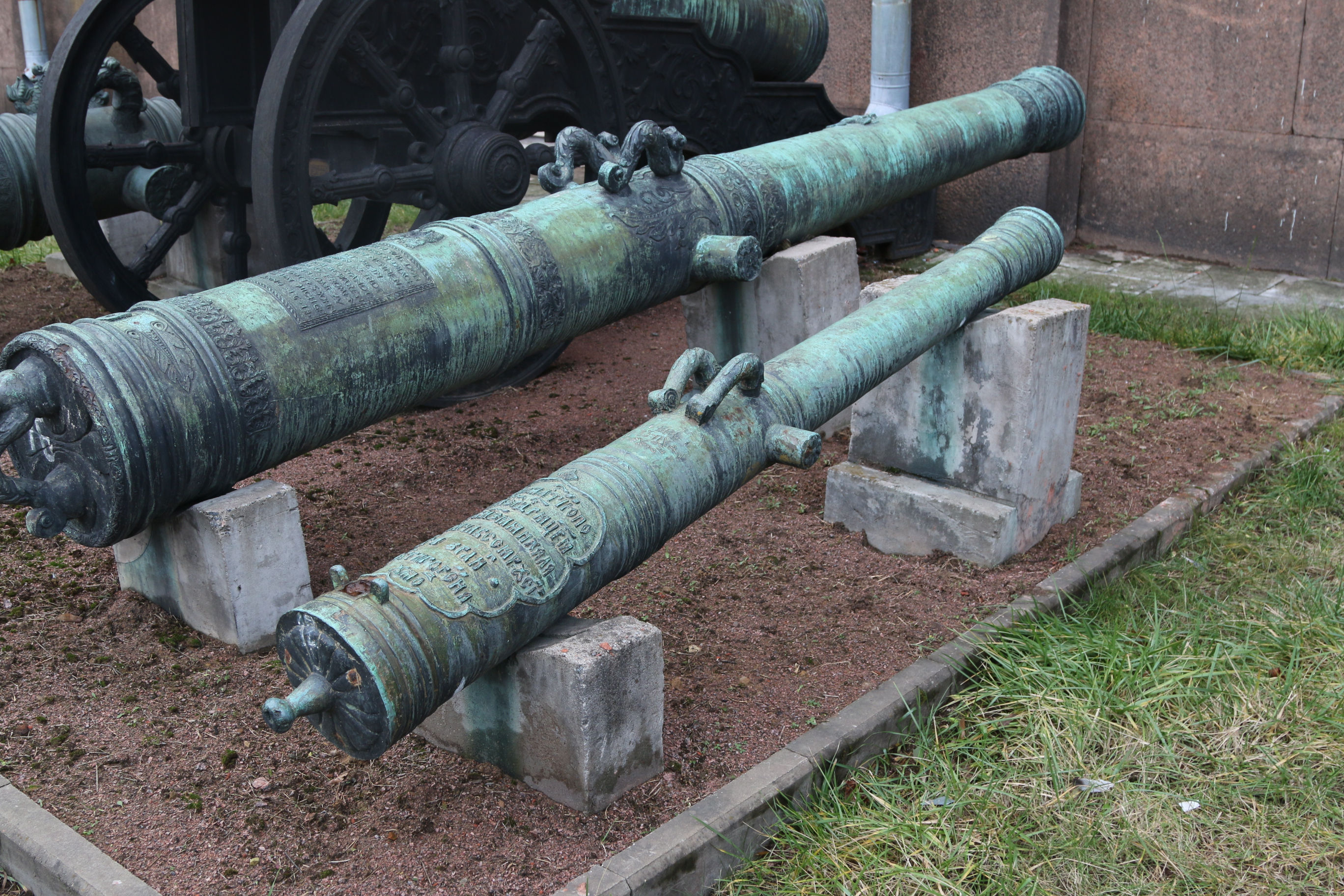
- Muscovite cannons of the 17th century. From the collection of the Artillery Museum in St. Petersburg
Date	September 1658
Location	Near Mglin, Cossack Hetmanate (now Russia)
Result	Cossack victory

Belligerents
Cossack Hetmanate	Tsardom of Russia

Commanders and leaders
Ivan Nechay	Andrey Dashkov

Strength
Unknown	4,500

Casualties and losses
Light	Heavy; 5 cannons captured

The Skirmish at Mhlyn took place in September of 1658 between the Cossacks of Ivan Nechay that supported the policy of Vyhovsky and the Russian unit of Andrey Dashkov that was advancing to the Lithuanian territory.

== Battle ==
Dashkov's 4,500-strong unit, which was advancing from Belgorod or from Pryluky on a campaign in Lithuania, was attacked by the Cossacks of Ivan Nechay near Mhlyn, leading to several days of clashes that ended with a Cossack success. Dashkov, while not being able to hold the pressure, was forced to retreat to Trubchevsk. Nechay captured 5 Russian cannons.

== Aftermath ==
Soon after the battle, Nechay launched a series of attacks on the Russian garrisons in the cities of White Ruthenia – he captured Novy Bykhaw, Krichev, Mstislavl and Roslavl. In the meanwhile, another Cossack leader Denis Murashka, attempted to capture Minsk with an assault but failed. The battle did not affect the course of 1658 campaign in Ukraine as the Russians eventually forced Vyhovsky to pledge his loyalty to them following the Siege of Varva.
