= Ochakov campaign (1528) =

1528 military campaign

- Part of the Cossack raids and Polish–Ottoman Wars
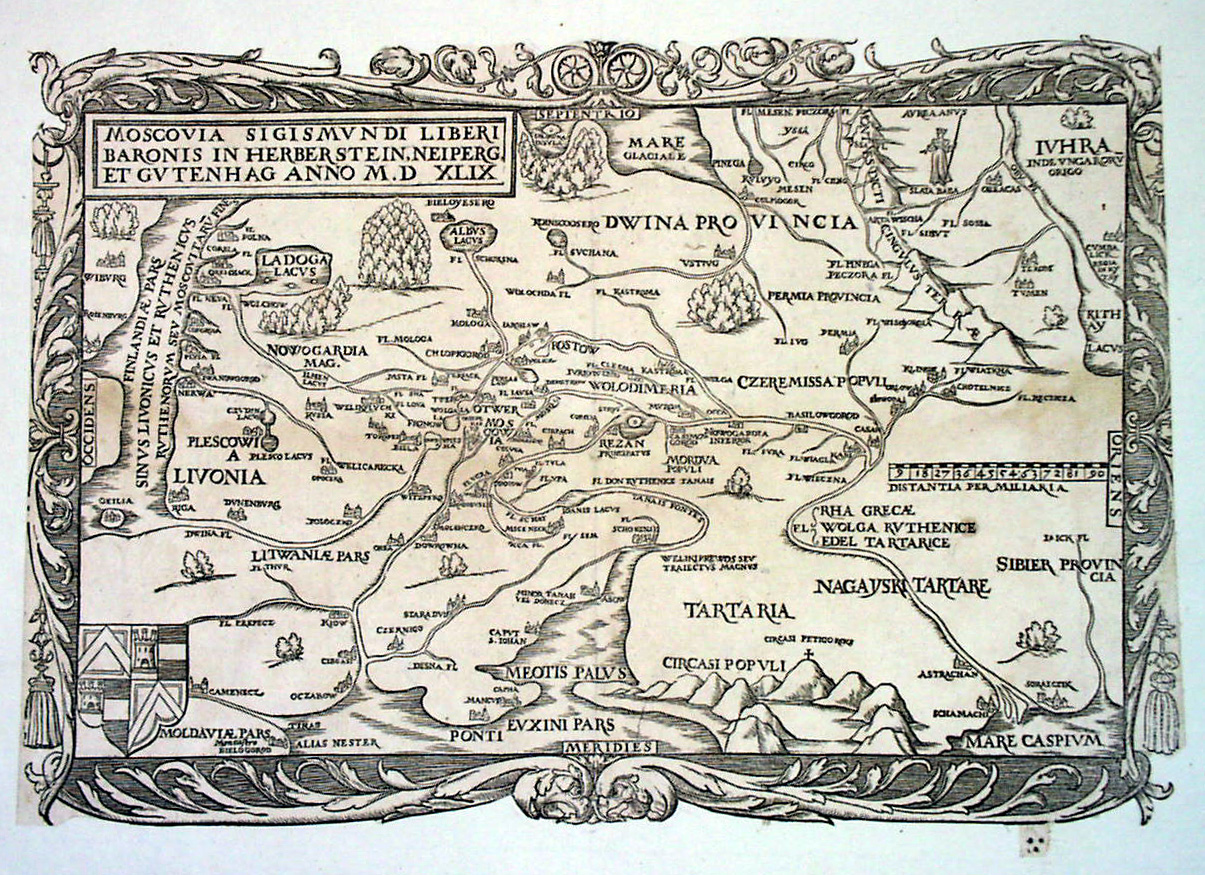
- Ochakiv on the map of Sigismund von Herberstein from 1549
Date	End of 1528
Location	Primarily near Ochakov, Ottoman Empire
Result	Cossack–Polish victory

Belligerents
Zaporozhian Cossacks; Kingdom of Poland	Crimean Khanate

Commanders and leaders
Ostap Dashkevych; Przecław Lanckoroński	Unknown

Strength
1,200 Poles and Ruthenians	Unknown, several Tatar detachments

Casualties and losses
Unknown	Heavy
- 500 horses captured 30,000 sheep captured

The Ochakov campaign (Note: Ukrainian: Похід на Очаків Polish: Wyprawa na Oczaków) was a major military expedition carried out by the Polish-Cossack forces of Ostap Dashkevych and Przecław Lanckoroński against the Crimean-Ottoman forces that took place in the end of 1528. A 1,200-strong Cossack-Polish unit defeated the Tatars near Ochakov and took a large loot.

== Background ==
First major Cossack campaign against Ochakov took place in 1493, when Bohdan Glynsky sacked the city. Raids on the city were repeated in 1523 and 1527. In 1528, a small Tatar invaded devastated Podolia but was defeated by the Polish forces near Kamianets.

== Campaign ==
In the end of 1528, Dashkevych and Lanckoroński started gathering people for their future campaign. They managed to gather a 1,200-strong army that consisted primarily of pospolite ruszenie and the Zaporozhian Cossacks. Hrushevskyi mentions the participation of Vinnytsia and Bratslav wicestarostas in the raid. They set off from Ukraine, invaded the Ottoman territory, looted the outskirts of Ochakov and captured 500 horses and 30,000 sheep from the Tatars. The Tatars tried to repel this invasion and fought three battles with the Polish-Cossack forces but were defeated in all of them. After these victories, the Allies withdrew to Ukraine.

== Aftermath ==
This success motivated the border starostas to launch another raid to Ochakov. In 1529, a 2,000-strong Polish-Cossack army led by Jerzy Jazłowiecki attacked the Ottoman territories again, using the internal struggle inside the Crimean Khanate. (Note: At the time, Saadet I Giray was struggling against Islâm-Soltan.) After a Ruthenian spy was captured, Jazłowiecki attacked the Tatars of Islâm-Soltan, who was an ally of the Polish government, and defeated them. Enraged by this action, Islâm-Soltan ordered Jazłowiecki to arrive in Ochakov and explain his actions. There his army was ambushed by the Tatars – Jazłowiecki was captured and most of his force killed. In retaliation for their defeat in 1529, Mikołaj Sieniawski and Przecław Lanckoroński set out for the Black Sea in 1530. Instead of attacking Ochakiv, they attacked Bilhorod-Dnistrovskyi, where they defeated the Tatar-Ottoman forces and won a significant victory.

Dashkevych's raids against Crimea, particularly those in 1523, 1527 and 1528, caused a siege of Cherkassy by Saadet Giray, which had failed.
