= Pereiaslav Regiment =

Pereiaslav Regiment Переяславський полк
- Active: 1625–1782
- Country: Cossack Hetmanate
- Type: Cossack Regiment
- Size: 19 sotnias, 2,982 Cossacks
- Garrison/HQ: Pereiaslav, Left-bank Ukraine
- Engagements: Khmelnytsky Uprising; The Ruin

Commanders
- Notable commanders: Pavlo Teteria; Yakym Somko

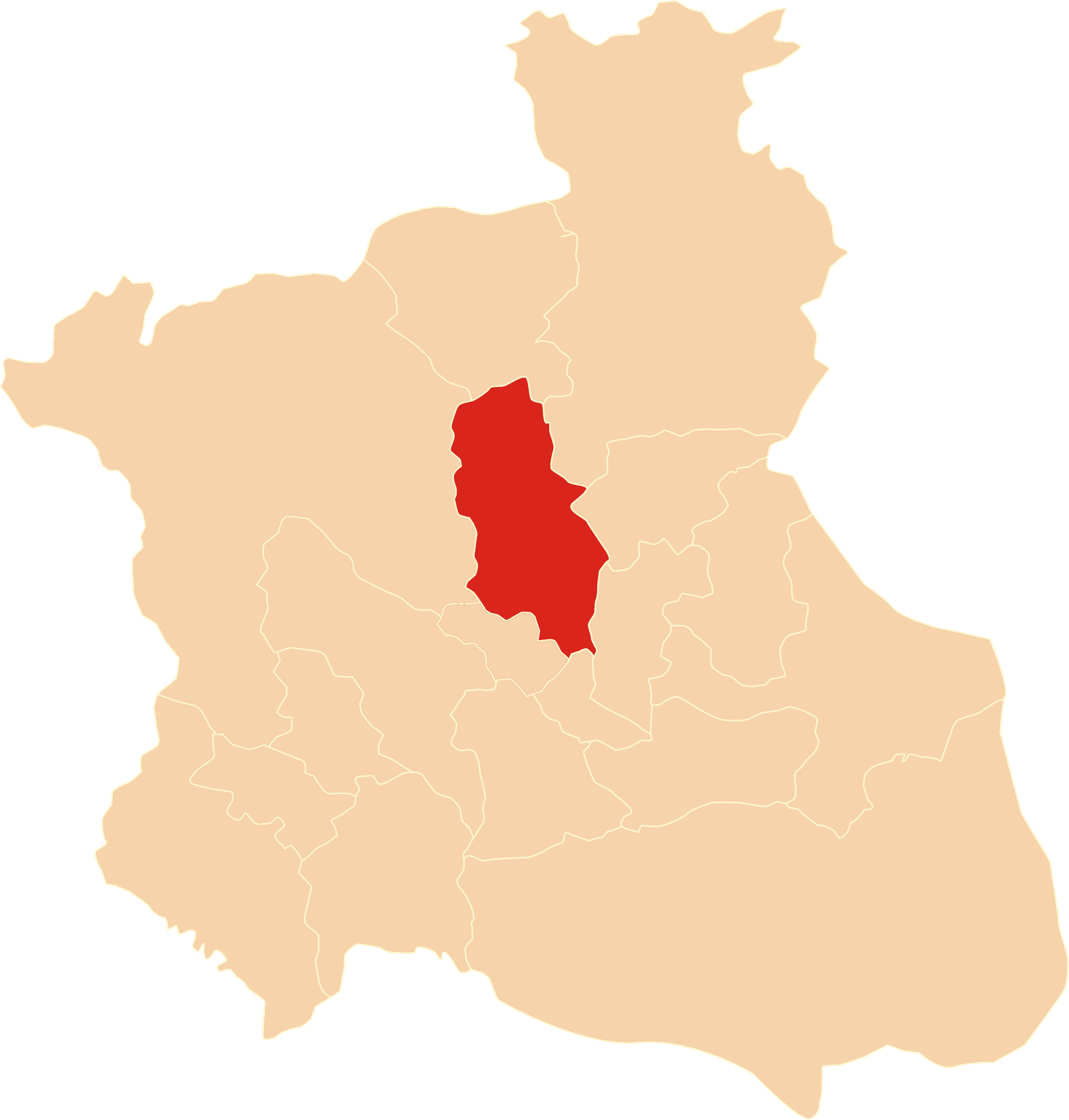
Pereiaslav Regiment (red) in the Cossack Hetmanate, 1660

Pereiaslav Regiment (Ukrainian: Переяславський полк) was an administrative division of the Cossack Hetmanate which existed between 1625 and 1782.

== History ==
The regiment was created on the base of a starostvo according to the 1625 Treaty of Kurukove, becoming the first Cossack regiment in Left-bank Ukraine. Its formation was confirmed by the 1649 Treaty of Zboriv. In 1654 the regiment, commanded by Pavlo Teteria, was present at the solemn confirmation ceremony of the Treaty of Pereiaslav, pledging an oath of allegiance to tsar Alexis of Russia. In 1660 the regiment supported acting hetman Yakym Somko, who proclaimed his allegiance to the tsar in Pereiaslav. In 1666 the regiment's colonel Danylo Yermolenko was killed during a revolt against hetman Ivan Briukhovetsky. Starting from 1706 the regiment was employed in the construction of Kyiv Fortress by the government of tsar Peter I, which caused protest against its Cossacks. During the 18th century Pereiaslav Regiment served as one of 10 administrative units of the Hetmanate. Following its liquidation, in 1782 the regiment's territory became part of Kiev Viceroyalty of the Russian Empire.

== Administrative subdivisions ==
According to the 1649 registry, the regiment consisted of the geographical subdivisions:

- Yahotyn sotnia
- Helmiaziv sotnia
- Berezan sotnia
- Bykiv sotnia
- Voronkiv sotnia
- Boryspil sotnia
- Baryshivka sotnia
- Basan sotnia
- Hoholiv sotnia
- Bohdanivtsi
- Kozelets sotnia
- Oster sotnia
- Zavorychi sotnia
- Morivsk sotnia
