= Battle of Lypovets (1651) =

- Part of Kalinowski's campaign during the Khmelnytsky Uprising
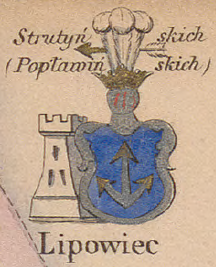
- Lypovets on the map of Zygmunt Herstmann
Date	19 March 1651
Location	Lipowiec (Lypovets), Cossack Hetmanate, Polish–Lithuanian Commonwealth
Result	Cossack victory
Territorial changes	Poles expelled from Eastern Podolia

Belligerents
Cossack Hetmanate	Polish–Lithuanian Commonwealth

Commanders and leaders
Demian Mnohohrishny; Martyn Pushkar; Osip Glukh	Marcin Kalinowski

Strength
2,000	Unknown

Casualties and losses
Unknown	Unknown, estimated to be heavy

The Battle of Lypovets (Polish: Bitwa pod Lipowcem, Ukrainian: Битва під Липівцем) was a battle that took place on 19 of March, 1651 between the forces of Cossack Hetmanate under the command of yesaul Demian Ignatovych, Osip Glukh and Martyn Pushkar on one side and the Polish field hetman Marcin Kalinowski on the other.

== Battle ==
In February, Polish hetman Marcin Kalinowski defeated the Cossacks at Krasne and sacked the city, as well as killing Danylo Nechai. Later he advanced towards Vinnytsia and besieged it, but was unable to capture the city due to a stubborn resistance by Ivan Bohun, famously for his ice treak during the siege. Meanwhile, Bohdan Khmelnytsky found out about the Polish invasion and sent Cossacks from Uman and Poltava regiments under the command of Demian Mnohohrishny (mentioned in the sources as "Demko Mykhailovych") to expel the Poles from Eastern Podolia. On 19 of March, Cossacks clashed with the Polish army near Lypovets. Cossack forces encircled the main Polish regiment and completely defeated it.

== Aftermath ==
The news of Polish defeat caused panic in Kalinowski's camp, forcing him to lift the siege of Vinnytsia on 20 of March and withdraw from Ukraine to Kamianets. Soon after the battle, Cossacks invaded the Polish territory. Their campaign culminated in the Battle of Berestechko, in which the Cossack-Tatar forces were defeated.
