= Siege of Suceava (1653) =

- Part of the Moldavian campaign during the Khmelnytsky Uprising
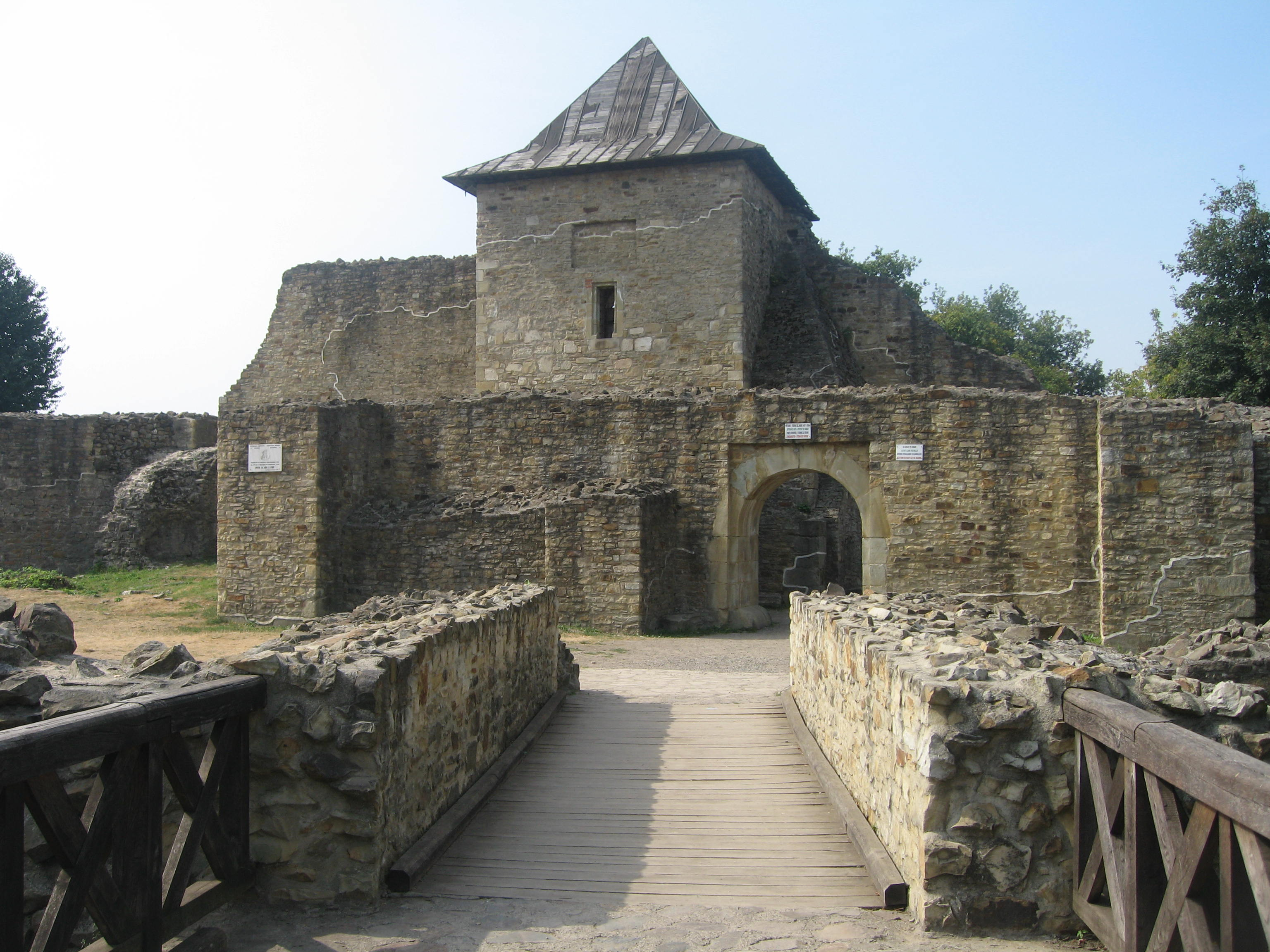
- The Suceava Castle in the present-day of the Suceava County in Romania
Date	22 July – 9 October, 1653
Location	Suceava, Principality of Moldavia
Result	Cossack defeat

Belligerents
Moldavia; Wallachia; Transylvania; Polish–Lithuanian Commonwealth	Moldavia; Cossack Hetmanate

Commanders and leaders
Gheorghe Ștefan; Matei Basarab; John Kemény; Sebastian Machowski	Vasile Lupu; Tymofiy Khmelnytsky †; Mykola Fedorovych †

Strength
25,000–30,000	1,000 Moldavians; 6,000 Cossacks

Casualties and losses
2,300 killed and wounded	2,000 killed and wounded

The siege of Suceava (Romanian: Asediul Sucevei, Ukrainian: Облога Сучави, Polish: Oblężenie Suczawy; 22 July – 9 October, 1653) was fought between the Principalities of Moldavia, Wallachia, Transylvania and Polish–Lithuanian Commonwealth against the Principality of Moldavia and Cossack Hetmanate as a part of the Khmelnytsky Uprising.

Near the site of the present-day city of Suceava in Romania, a forces of Moldavia, Wallachia, Transylvania and Polish–Lithuanian Commonwealth under the command of Princes Gheorghe Ștefan, Matei Basarab and John Kemény, Colonels Henryk Dehoff, Jan Kodracki and Sebastian Machowski defeated and held besieged the positions of the Moldavians and Zaporozhian Cossacks under the command of Voivode Vasile Lupu, Otaman Tymofiy Khmelnytsky, who was killed in the battle and Mykola Fedorovych in the Suceava Castle.

The strength of the defending Cossacks and Moldovans did not exceed 7,000, while a detachment of 25,000 to 30,000 acted against them.
