= Stavchany, Khmelnytskyi Oblast =

Village in Khmelnytskyi Oblast, Ukraine

Stavchany Ставчани
- Village
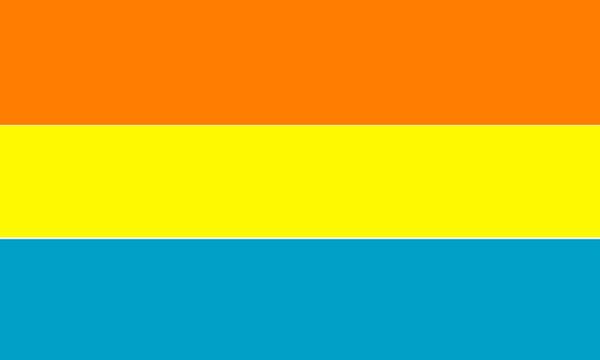
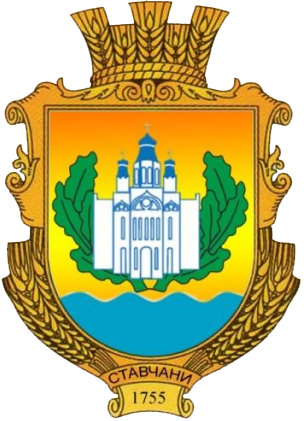
- Flag Coat of arms

- Location within Khmelnytskyi Oblast Location within Ukraine
- Coordinates: 48°44′10″N 27°20′14″E
- Country: Ukraine
- Oblast: Khmelnytskyi Oblast
- Region: Kamianets-Podilskyi Raion
- Hromada: Nova Ushytsia settlement hromada

Area
  - Total: 2.089 km^{2} (0.807 sq mi)
- Elevation: 260 m (850 ft)

Population (2001)
  - Total: 599
  - Density: 287/km^{2} (743/sq mi)
- Time zone: UTC+2 (EET)
  - Summer (DST): UTC+3 (EEST)
- Postal code: 32635
- Area code: +380 3847

Stavchany (Ukrainian: Ставчани) is a village in Kamianets-Podilskyi Raion, Khmelnytskyi Oblast, Ukraine. It belongs to Nova Ushytsia settlement hromada, one of the hromadas of Ukraine.

Until 18 July 2020, Stavchany belonged to Nova Ushytsia Raion. The raion was abolished in July 2020 as part of the administrative reform of Ukraine, which reduced the number of raions of Khmelnytskyi Oblast to three.
