= Przecław Lanckoroński =

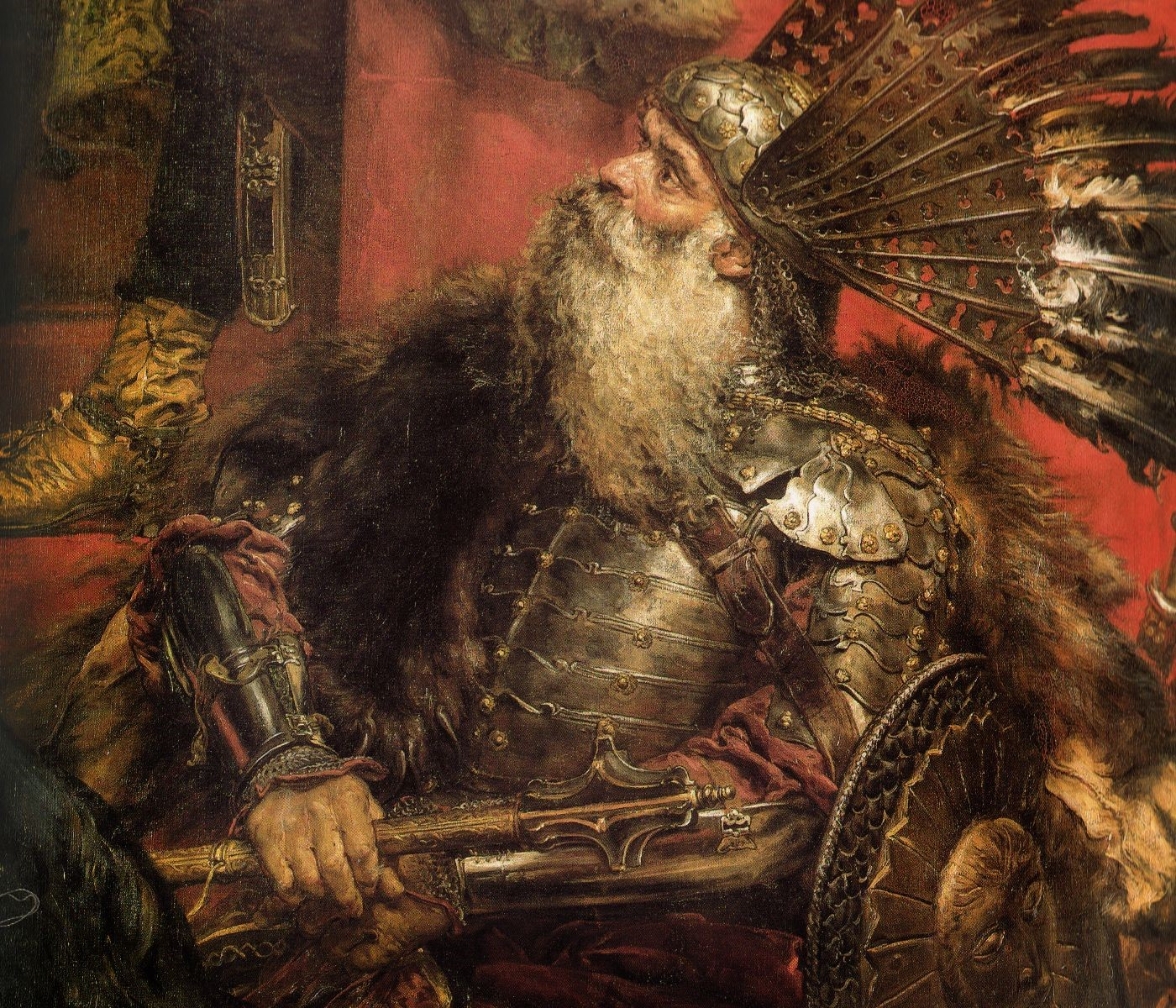
Przecław Lanckoroński

Przecław Lanckoroński (Ukrainian: Предслав Лянцкоронський) of Brzezie of Zadora coat of arms (died 10 June 1531) was a notable member of the Polish nobleman, often identified as the first hetman of the Cossacks in service of Poland, as well as a landowner and starost of Chmielnik, title awarded in modern Ukraine.

== Biography ==
He was born in Brzezie, to the family of Stanisław and Anna Lanckoroński, née Kurozwęcka. In his youth he was sent abroad by his parents and travelled through France, Italy, Hungary, German states, as well as to the Holy Land, where he was awarded the title of Knight of Christ's Grave.

Upon his return to Poland he joined the Polish Army, where he served under Konstanty Ostrogski. Together with his fellow starosta of Cherkassy, he organized several units out of local Zaporozhian Cossacks and lead them to various wars against the Ottoman Empire and Crimean Khanate. He gained much fame as one of the last knights and a hero who reached Bilhorod in 1516 and Ochakov in 1528. And although never awarded the title of hetman, he is sometimes treated as the first hetman of the Ukrainian Cossacks. He died in Kraków in 1531.

He is one of the characters on the famous painting by Jan Matejko, Prussian Homage.

== See also ==
- Hetman of Zaporizhian Cossacks

== Additional informations ==
=== Sources ===
- Dmytro Doroshenko (1975). A Survey of Ukrainian History. Winnipeg: Humeniuk Publication Foundation (Canada).
