= Moldavian campaigns (1594–1595) =

Moldavian campaigns of 1594–1595
- Part of the Cossack raids, Moldavian–Ottoman Wars and the Long Turkish War
Date	1594–1595
Location	Moldavia
Result	Cossack–Moldavian victory
Territorial changes	Ottomans expelled from Moldavia

Belligerents
Ottoman Empire	Zaporozhian Cossacks; Moldavia

Commanders and leaders
(Ottoman Empire) Murad III	Severyn Nalyvaiko; Hryhoriy Loboda; Jan Oryszowski; Aaron the Tyrant

Strength
Unknown	2,000–2,500; 14,000

Casualties and losses
Heavy	Unknown

The Moldavian Cossack campaigns of 1594–1595 (Note: Romanian: Campaniile cazace moldovenești Turkish: Boğdana Kazak Seferleri Ukrainian: Молдавські козацькі походи) were a series of expeditions by Zaporozhian Cossacks into Moldavia, which was under the suzerainty of the Ottoman Empire.

== Background ==
In 1593, a war broke out between the Habsburg Monarchy and the Ottoman Empire over control of Transylvania. Seeking allies against the Turks, Emperor Rudolph II dispatched Count Eric Lasota to the Zaporizhian Sich. With the support of Russian envoys, Lasota successfully persuaded the Cossacks to launch an incursion into Ottoman territories. In December 1593, Hryhoriy Loboda led 3,000 Cossacks in a raid on Ottoman fortress of Orhei in Moldavia and successfully plundered it. Cossacks plundered Izmail and Kiliya in the same year. The main invasion took place in 1594.

== Campaigns ==
In June 1594, Severyn Nalyvaiko gathered 2,000–2,500 Cossacks for the purpose of "fight against infidels". During this time, Ottoman army broke into Hungary. On 13 November 1594, Aaron the Tyrant switched sides and joined the Cossacks, defeating Ottomans at Iași and gathering an army of 14,000 Moldavians to start an anti-Ottoman offensive in Moldavia. Cossacks captured and plundered the Ottoman city of Izmail, freeing Christian captives. In 1595, Loboda's and Nalyvaiko's Cossacks jointly raided Izmail. Cossacks launched a campaign into Moldavia, while also besieging Ottoman forces at Kiliya and Budjak.

== Aftermath ==
At the end of these campaigns, Poland-Lithuania occupied Moldavia and signed a truce with the Ottoman Empire. Polish authorities had to deal with Cossack rebellions and placed many restrictions on Cossack register, which were only lifted in 1600.
