= Battle of Pohost =

- Part of the Khmelnytsky Uprising
| Date | 4 September 1648 |
| Location | Pohost |
| Result | Polish–Lithuanian victory |

Belligerents
| Polish–Lithuanian Commonwealth | Cossack Hetmanate |

Commanders and leaders
| Unknown | Jan Sokołowski (WIA) |

Strength
| 600 | A few thousand |

Casualties and losses
| Unknown | 2,000 |

The Battle of Pohost was an armed clash that took place on 4 September 1648, during the Khmelnytsky Uprising.

== Background ==
At the end of August 1648, Cossack insurgents led by the self-proclaimed Hetman Jan Sokolowski (aka Sokowski) began the siege of Slutsk, a fortress belonging to Prince Janusz Radziwill, located in Novgorod province. The defence of the fortress was commanded by Vilnius podstoli Jan Sosnowski.

== Battle ==
After three unsuccessful assaults, in which the Cossacks suffered significant losses (about 600 killed, mostly from the blacks), the insurgents began to retreat. Jan Sosnowski sent 600 cavalrymen after them. On 4 September, after a three-mile chase, the Lithuanians caught up with the fleeing Cossacks near the town of Pohost, located about 36 km from Slutsk, at the crossing of the Sluch River. The bridge across the river was probably clogged by retreating tabor wagons. A fierce battle ensued on the foreshore. During the battle, thanks to the advice of a local peasant, several Lithuanian banners crossed the nearby ford to the other side of the river and attacked the insurgents' rear. The surprised Cossacks panicked and began to flee. Those fleeing were chased as far as Turów(Turov).

== Aftermath ==
Losses on the Cossack side amounted to around 2,000 dead, including the military scribe Turchinovich. A number of Cossacks were taken prisoner, of whom six "more significant" captives were sent back to Vilnius. Jan Sokolowski was severely wounded and soon died in Petrykovice. The Lithuanians also suffered significant losses.
