= Battle of Bila Tserkva (1596) =

- Part of the Nalyvaiko Uprising
Date	3–4 March, 1596
Location	Bila Tserkva, Polish-Lithuanian Commonwealth
Result	Polish-Lithuanian victory

Belligerents
Polish–Lithuanian Commonwealth	Zaporozhian Cossacks

Commanders and leaders
Kyryk Ruzhynsky; Stanisław Żółkiewski	Severyn Nalyvaiko; Matviy Shaula

Strength
500+	7,000

Casualties and losses
Heavy	Heavy

The Battle of Bila Tserkva (Ukrainian: Битва під Білою Церквою) was a significant battle fought during the Nalyvaiko Uprising between the Cossack insurgents led by Severyn Nalyvaiko and Matviy Shaula and the Polish-Lithuanian Commonwealth army led by Kyryk Ruzhynsky.

== Prelude ==
Żółkiewski was gathering his forces at his quarters in the Bracław region, while he sent Kyryk Różyński, a recent commander of the Cossacks, into the Kyiv region against the rebels. First, Różyński went to his estate in ,Pavoloch where he dealt harshly with the peasants accused of participating in the unrest. After achieving a few local successes, he moved toward Bila Tserkva, where Shaula and Nalyvaiko were also heading.

== Battle ==
On the night of April 2-3, seven thousand Cossacks armed with sabres and handguns appeared at the city walls. In Bila Cerkiew, Różyński had only five hundred soldiers from Żółkiewski's company and his own posts, but Żółkiewski rushed to help him, despite the terrible condition of the softened, muddy roads, covered with a fresh layer of snow. Różyński, having learned about the approaching Cossacks, attacked Shaula, who had not expected such a quick reaction from the Polish side and, after the destruction of the camp, saved himself by escaping. Supposedly thousands of Cossacks were killed in this attack. In the meantime, Nalewajko's troops entered Bila Tserkva, which had been abandoned by Różyński. When Różyński returned from the pursuit, he was unexpectedly attacked by them, so he locked himself in the fortress and sent a messenger to Żółkiewski asking for help. Stanisław Żółkiewski did not wait for news from Różyński, hearing the sounds of battle, he set off on a forced march towards the city. Events began to take an unfavourable turn for the Cossacks, so they began to retreat to Trypillia.

== Aftermath ==
Having realized that the Cossacks had recently fled, Żółkiewski quickly went after them. He caught up with them a few kilometers outside the city, because the Cossacks, knowing the hetman's energy and his eagerness to fight, had managed to form a camp of their own. Żółkiewski attacked them at Ostry Kamień.

== Bibliography ==
- Serczyk, Władysław Andrzej (2008). Na dalekiej Ukrainie: dzieje Kozaczyzny do 1648 roku. Kraków: Wydawnictwo Avalon. ISBN 978-83-60448-44-1.
- Besala, Jerzy (1988). Stanisław Żółkiewski. Biografie sławnych ludzi (Wyd. 1 ed.). Warszawa: Państwowy Instytut Wydawniczy. ISBN 978-83-06-01583-6. OCLC 23874129.
