= Battle of Rzeczyca =

- Part of the Khmelnytsky Uprising
Date	Autumn 1649
Location	Rzeczyca, a town in Belarus, on the Dnieper River
Result	Polish–Lithuanian victory

Belligerents
Polish–Lithuanian Commonwealth	Cossack Hetmanate

Commanders and leaders
Hrehory Mirski	Piotr Głowacki (POW)

Strength
Unknown	Unknown

Casualties and losses
Unknown	Heavy

The Battle of Rzeczyca was an armed clash that took place on autumn 1649, during the Khmelnytsky Uprising.

== Battle ==
A Cossack unit commanded by Colonel Piotr Głowacki advanced into Lithuania but was detected by Lithuanian scouts and lured into an ambush by Hrehory Mirski. Mirski used deception, bribing a local peasant who convinced the Cossacks that only scattered Lithuanian troops were nearby.

When the Cossacks entered a village near Rzeczyca, Lithuanian dragoons, infantry, and reiters attacked them from hiding, completely destroying Głowacki's unit. Głowacki himself was captured and executed, although there are uncertain reports regarding his execution, as a Cossack regiment under his command was later seen marching with Chmielnicki's army towards Zbaraż. The victory was credited to the Lithuanian Field Hetman Janusz Radziwiłł, Radziwiłł was praised in the anonymous Song of Battle.
