= Pereiaslav revolt =

1666 uprising

- Part of the Polish–Russian War (1654–1667) as part of the Ruin
Date	19 June 1666 – c. March 1667
Location	Territory of Pereiaslav Regiment, Cossack Hetmanate (present-day Ukraine)
Result	Uprising suppressed

Belligerents
Pereiaslav Regiment; Right-bank Hetmanate; Crimean Khanate	Tsardom of Russia; Left-bank Hetmanate

Commanders and leaders
Maxim Homenko; Gases-Choban Giray	Konstantin Shcherbatov; Yakov Hitrovo; Ivan Briukhovetsky

The Pereiaslav revolt there was an uprising of the inhabitants and Cossacks of Pereiaslav against the power of the new Hetman Ivan Briukhovetsky, caused by the corruption of his administration and the conclusion of the Moscow Articles. The Army of the Tsardom of Russia suppressed the main pockets of rebellion relatively quickly, but faced the right-bank army of Petro Doroshenko, and later the Crimean Tatars, but was able to repel their invasion. In March 1667, the rebels swore allegiance to the Alexis, as they learned about the conclusion of the Truce of Andrusovo.

== Background ==
After the defeat of the John Casimir II's Muscovite campaign and the Right-Bank uprising, the Russian administration began discussing the legal status of Ukraine, which led to the conclusion of the Moscow Articles. According to which taxes collected on the territory of Ukraine went directly to the state treasury of Muscovy, confirmed the Magdeburg Law of the main political centers of the region and increased the number of garrisons.

The main reason for the uprising can be considered the conflict of the inhabitants and Cossacks of Pereiaslav with the new Hetman Ivan Briukhovetsky. In the spring of 1665, there was a major uprising of the city's residents against the local colonel Daniil Ermolenko, led by a certain Decik, a native of the Zaporozhian Cossacks. The uprising was quickly dealt with and the captured leader of the uprising was sent to Moscow, and from there into exile in Siberia.

== Uprising ==
On June 19, a major riot broke out, Cossack Colonel Daniil Ermolenko was killed, and the Muscovites managed to enter the castle, losing 200 people. The rebels organized a new rada, where they elected a new colonel and starshyna, while plundering and destroying the lands of merchants, tsarist soldiers and the former Cossack elite of the city. About 4,000 Cossacks of Petro Doroshenko went to help the uprising, who were determined to support the uprising. By this time, the Russians had sent an expedition of 2,300 soldiers against the uprising from Kiev, where they knocked out the rebels from Pereiaslav, after which they clashed in a field battle with Doroshenko's Cossacks near Zolotonosha. The Russians won, but they could not build on it and got bogged down in a long siege of the city. Soon, the Crimean horde arrived to help the rebels, who forced the Russians to retreat to Pereiaslav, However, here the Russians unexpectedly attacked the Crimeans themselves and put them to flight. The uprising had not yet been suppressed, because of the winter, the Muscovites did not dare to begin a siege of the cities where the rebels had locked themselves in and sent winter quarters. However, seeing the futility of further struggle, after learning about the beginning of negotiations in Andrusovo, the Cossacks again swore allegiance to the tsar.
