= Battle of Pillau (1635) =

1635 battle

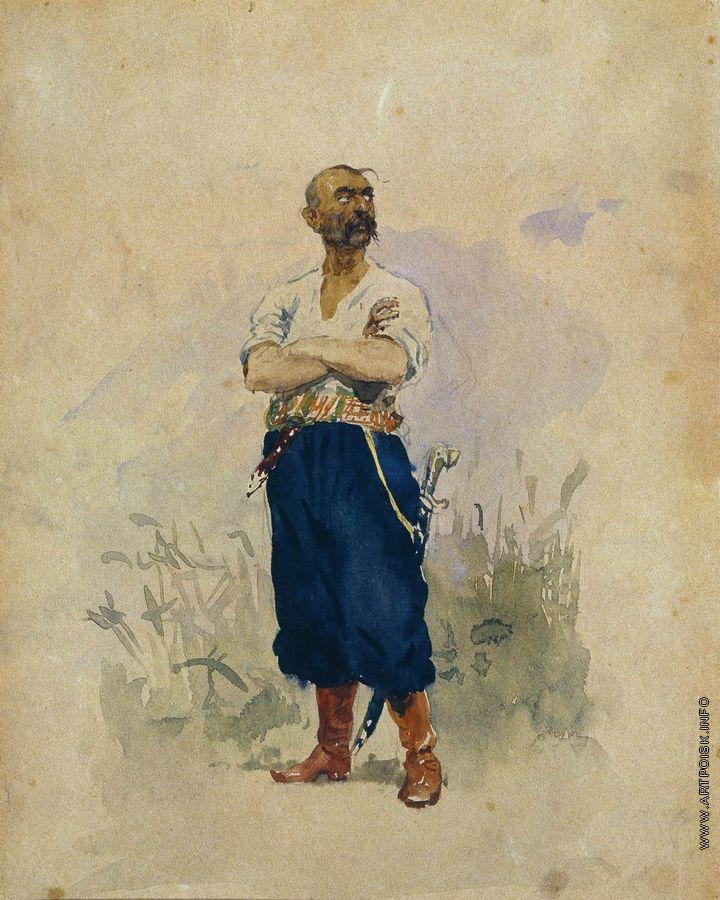
- Cossack of the Zaporozhian Sich. Painting by Ilya Repin
Date	30–31 August or in early September 1635
Location	Near Pillau (now Baltiysk, Russia)
Result	Cossack victory

Belligerents
Zaporozhian Cossacks	Swedish Empire

Commanders and leaders
Konstanty Wołk	(Swedish Empire) Captured ship commander †

Strength
Several chaikas	Unknown

Casualties and losses
None	Several killed 1 ship captured

The Battle of Pillau or Battle of Piława (Note: Ukrainian: Битва під Пилявою Swedish: Slaget vid Pillau) was a naval battle that took place on 31 August 1635 between the Zaporozhian Cossacks on the service of Poland-Lithuania and the Swedish fleet. The Cossack fleet attacked the Swedish ships that were stationed on a raid, captured one of them and inflicted casualties on the Swedes.

== Background ==
In 1629, the Truce of Altmark that ended the 1626–1629 Polish-Swedish war was signed. Its terms lasted for six years and were ending in 1635, leading to a new conflict between Poland-Lithuania and Sweden. The Polish-Lithuanian Commonwealth was preparing for a new war and was forced to recruit the Cossacks. In may 1635, Władysław Vasa ordered a Cossack leader Konstanty Wołk to recruit 1,500 Cossacks and deprive them to Prussia. On 5 July, Władysław sent a letter to him again where he ordered him to recruit one thousand registered Cossacks in case the mobilization of unregistered Cossacks failed. On 19 July, Wołk arrived in Kaunas. Władysław ordered to arrest several ships that were stationed in Königsberg and transfer them to Cossacks. Meanwhile, the Swedes captured Polish ship "Czarny Orzel" and deprived it to Sweden. The king then ordered Wołk to set off for a raid against the Swedes.

== Battle ==
The battle was described in details by O. Radziwiłł – on 30 August (according to other source – in early September), the Cossacks had set off from Königsberg and on the night they approached Pillau while being unnoticed by the Swedes. In the morning, the Swedish garrison noticed them and began firing from cannons, but did not bring impact on the Cossacks due to artillery fire not being able to reach them. The Swedish side offered a peace talks to Cossacks but their proposition was refused. Later, they attacked the Swedish fleet and separated one frigate from the others, captured it, and massacred its crew.

== Aftermath ==
The Cossacks continued to patrol the Baltic coast for two weeks after the battle. The Cossack actions on the Baltic sea were overall successful and forced the Swedes to accelerate peace talks with Poland-Lithuania. On 12 September, the Treaty of Stuhmsdorf was signed, which extended the previous truce of Altmark. Sweden gave up the Prussian ports, and Poland ceded most of Livonia to Sweden. On 23 September, Władysław sent another letter to Konstanty Wołk where he ordered him to return to Ukraine. The captured Swedish frigate was exchanged for the "Czarny Orzel" ship that was previously captured from the Poles.

== See also ==
- Polish–Swedish War (1626–1629)
- Cossack raids

== Bibliography ==
Hrushevskyi, Mykhailo (1956). History of Ukraine-Rus'. Volume VIII, chapter IV. New York.
