= Keresztes =

Keresztes (Hungarian: crusader) is a Hungarian surname. Notable people with the surname include:

- Attila Keresztes, Hungarian fencer
- Dóra Keresztes, Hungarian artist
- Lajos Keresztes, Hungarian wrestler
- László Lóránt Keresztes, Hungarian economist and politician
- Noel Keresztes, Hungarian footballer
- Szilárd Keresztes, Hungarian bishop
- Zalán Keresztes, Hungarian footballer

== See also ==
- Ferenc Keresztes-Fischer, Hungarian politician
- Lajos Keresztes-Fischer, Hungarian military officer
- Battle of Keresztes, 1596
