= Moldavian campaign of Tymofiy Khmelnytsky =

Third Moldavian campaign of Tymofiy Khmelnytsky
- Part of Khmelnytsky Uprising
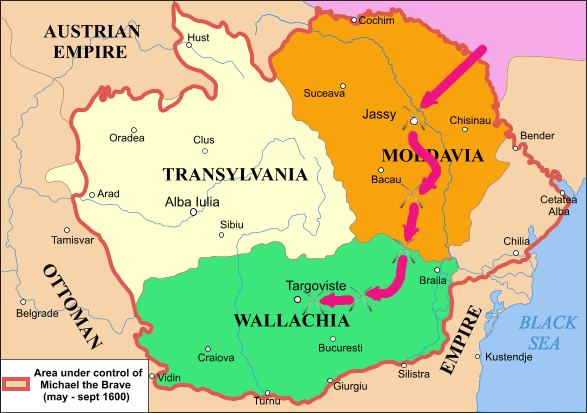
- Tymofiy Khmelnytsky's campaign in Wallachia, May 1653.
Date	1653
Location	Wallachia, Moldavia
Result	Cossack defeat

Belligerents
Moldavia; Transylvania; Wallachia; Poland–Lithuania	Cossack Hetmanate; Crimean Khanate; Moldavia

Commanders and leaders
Gheorghe Ștefan; Matei Basarab; George II Rákóczi; Jan Kodracki	Tymofiy Khmelnytsky †; Vasile Lupu

The Third Moldavian campaign of Tymofiy Khmelnytsky in 1653 was a military campaign in Moldavia and Wallachia by the Cossack-Moldavian army of the voivode Vasile Lupu and the hetman in charge, Tymofiy Khmelnytsky, against the pretender to the Moldavian throne, George Stefan, and the Wallachian troops of prince Matviy Basarab, supported by mercenaries from Transylvania, Poland, and Serbia. The Cossack-Moldavian army was defeated, and Tymofiy himself was killed, which put an end to Bohdan Khmelnytsky's attempts to include Moldavia in the sphere of influence of the Zaporozhian Army, as well as to Lupu's attempt to take the throne of Wallachia and his power in Moldavia.

== Background ==
=== Moldavian Campaign of 1650 ===
Vasile Lupu, the ruler of the principality, maintained friendly relations with Bohdan Khmelnytsky from October 1648, but he also sent information about the state of the Zaporozhian Army to Warsaw and lent the royal government money to hire soldiers. An opportunity to tie Moldavia more closely to Ukrainian politics was the summer 1650 campaign of the Kalga Sultan of Crimea-Girey to Moldavian lands, allegedly to punish Moldavian troops for attacks on Tatars.

In early 1650, the Crimean khan Islam III Gerai demanded that Khmelnytsky, as payment for the Tatar army's assistance against King John II Casimir's campaign the previous year (which ended with the Battle of Zboriv and the conclusion of the Zboriv Treaty), take part in a planned campaign against the Moscow state. Since Moscow had always been regarded by Bohdan as an important future ally, and participation in the Moscow campaign would have permanently ruled out the possibility of military assistance from Moscow, Bohdan Khmelnytsky decided to redirect the khan to another direction. He mentioned the Moldavian attacks on Tatar detachments returning from the Polish-Lithuanian Commonwealth in 1648. In his relations with Moldavia and Moscow, Khmelnytsky himself stressed that as an ally of the khan, he was obliged to participate in this expedition.

Having crossed the Dniester with the Tatars, the hetman surprisingly occupied Lasi in September 1650, and then demanded an alliance in an ultimatum, which was to be secured by the marriage of the voivode's daughter Rosanda to Khmelnytsky's son Tymofiy. While tying Moldavia to Ukraine, this marriage would also introduce the Cossack leader to the circle of legitimate rulers patronised by the Porte.

=== Tymofiy Khmelnytsky's marriage ===
At the end of July 1652, Tymosh's 70,000-strong Cossack detachment set out on a wedding campaign; the wedding took place in Iași, and in early September the hetman and his young wife returned home.

=== Gheorghe Ștefan's rebellion ===
The alliance with Lupu did not bring Khmelnytsky the expected benefits. In early 1653, Prince George II of Transylvania, despite Khmelnytsky's proposals for an alliance and support for his claims to the Polish throne, decided to launch hostilities against Vasile Lupu in an attempt to enlist the support of the Polish-Lithuanian Commonwealth. The prince reached an agreement on joint actions with the ruler of Wallachia, Matei Basarab, who was helping the Moldavian logothet Gheorge prepare another dynastic coup.

In April 1653, Gheorghe's rebellion broke out in Moldavia, supported by Transylvania and Wallachia. Vasile Lupu fled to Khotyn and then to Kamianets, asking for immediate help from the hetman and the Polish king.

=== Khmelnytsky's miscalculations ===
B. Khmelnytsky decided to respond to the matchmaker's call, which was his major political miscalculation. He interfered in the internal affairs of the state vassally dependent on the Porte, with the support of the Sultan's government (which agreed to the transition of both Danube principalities under Khmelnytsky's influence); but the appearance of Cossack forces in Moldavia on the side of Vasile Lupu meant hostile actions against Wallachia and Transylvania, which immediately made their rulers allies of the Polish-Lithuanian Commonwealth in the fight against the Hetmanate. The second dangerous mistake was the appointment of Tymosh's son, who was brave, but hot-tempered and inexperienced in military affairs and political intrigues, as commander-in-chief of the Cossack corps instead of the talented commander Ivan Bohun.

== The Campaign ==
=== Initial successes of the Cossack army ===
On 18 April 1653, the Zaporozhian army led by Tymofiy went to help the hetman's matchmaker. His title in a letter to Vasile Lupu "Tymosh Khmelnytsky Hetman of the Zaporozhian Army" is noteworthy, as it does not include the term "commanding officer", which he was in fact. The Cossacks in the Bratslav region were joined by about 2,000 opryshky led by Hrytsko (Hertserko). After crossing the Dniester near Yampol, the army marched to Yassy. On 1 May, it defeated the Transylvanian-Wallachian army and captured the capital of Moldavia. After returning to power, Vasile Lupu decided to use the presence of Ukrainian regiments to seize Wallachia. To this end, he persuaded the ambitious and gullible Tymofiy to continue the campaign.

The Cossack colonels tried to persuade the commander not to take this rash step, since Bohdan Khmelnytsky had not given instructions to fight with Wallachia or Transylvania. However, having felt the taste of power, Tymofiy, incited by his father-in-law, gave free rein to his feelings: he grabbed a saber and wounded Ivan Bohun (according to other sources, General Osavul Demian Lysovets).

=== Wallachian Campaign ===
On 9 May, the Cossack-Moldavian army, on the orders of the ambitious hetman, set out and crossed the border of Wallachia, provoking resistance from the combined Transylvanian-Wallachian forces.

On May 22, the Cossack-Moldavian army defeated 9,000 Wallachian cavalry led by Dicu Buescu near Fokshany, but in the battle of 26 May near the Telezhyna River, the Wallachians gave a firm rebuff, and two Cossack centurions were killed in the battle. On 27 May, the main forces of the opposing armies met near the village of Finta on the Yalovitsa River, not far from the Wallachian capital of Târgoviște. Here, the Cossack-Moldavian army suffered a catastrophic defeat and was virtually destroyed.

Tymofiy and Lupu, as well as most of the Cossack officers, managed to escape, and soon reinforcements from Ukraine came to their aid. But the Polish-Lithuanian Commonwealth now openly sided with Wallachia. Cossack troops continued to suffer setbacks. The defeat at Finta had a direct impact on events in the Hetmanate. When the news of the defeat reached the Cossack army on the march to Kamianets, it triggered a massive protest against Hetman Bohdan Khmelnytsky's policy, which apparently took place on 20 June 1653 in the camp near Horodok. The news of the severe defeat was the last straw in the face of acute food and fodder shortages, growing discontent among the soldiers with the plundering of the Tatars, and the threat of a pestilence epidemic. Gathered in a huge crowd, the Cossacks marched to the pond. For his part, Khmelnytsky, having learned of the rebellion, hurried to the convoy. The meeting took place on the road. Surrounding the hetman's carriage, "the Cossacks with great impoliteness" began to reproach him for the length of the war, the devastation of cities, the famine that was causing their wives and children to die, the military and political alliance with the khan, who "filled the whole Crimea with us," indulging his son, and so on. Khmelnytsky managed to calm the Cossacks down, but he was forced to declare that the campaign was over, so the army would return to Bila Tserkva, where they would "wait for the Poles". The next day, the army left the outskirts of Horodok. The plan of the military campaign was disrupted by opposition from the rank and file of the Cossack army.

=== End of the Campaign ===
Tymofiy and Lupu were able to return to Moldavia with a new Cossack army. Meanwhile, George managed to defeat Lupu's army on 24 June 1653. With the approach of the Transylvanian detachments, he managed to inflict a new defeat on the united Cossack-Moldavian army on 16 July 1653, after which Lupu was forced to leave Moldavia.

In mid-July, Bohdan Khmelnytsky sent a new embassy to Istanbul, explaining the reason for the deployment of troops to Moldavia, confirming his agreement to accept the Sultan's patronage, and asking for help. Since the second half of June, Istanbul's policy towards Ukraine has shown a negative trend of shifting from full support to neutrality. This change was due to the hetman's delay in swearing the 3 Aporos Army to loyalty to the sultan, as well as the Ukrainian side's refusal to pay tribute. It was strengthened when Istanbul received information about Bohdan Khmelnytsky's interference in Moldavian affairs. In the first decade of August, the sultan recognised Georgica as the ruler of Moldavia. At the same time, the khan was ordered to warn the hetman not to support Lupa and not to send his son with an army to Moldavia. Despite this, Khmelnytsky sent Tymofiy to Suceava with a small (8,000) contingent of Cossacks.

==== Siege of Suceava ====
The Siege between 10 and 12 September 1653 witnessed intense clashes, particularly on the 11th of September. The Cossacks, feeling the pressure of a siege with depleting supplies in the fortress, opted for a decisive move. Tymofiy Khmelnytsky orchestrated a formidable strike force of around 5,000 soldiers, focusing their main assault on the positions held by the Transylvanians.

In the initial thrust, the Cossacks breached the ramparts, managing to seize several cannons. However, a resilient counterattack pushed them back, creating confusion among the Cossack ranks. Sensing an opportunity, the siege command decided to escalate the conflict and initiated a general assault.

The ensuing assault, lasting three hours, unfolded on the afternoon of September 11, 1653. Despite the deployment of fresh dragoons from Denhoff's detachment, the Attackers faced staunch resistance from the Cossacks. The lack of firearms, possibly due to a shortage of gunpowder, added to the complexity of the battle. Eyewitness accounts vividly describe the scene, with Polish corpses reportedly filling the rampart in front of the resounding Cossack chants.

The toll on the anti-Cossack coalition was large, with casualties including 1,500 Moldavians, Wallachians, and Transylvanians, along with 800 Poles. Among the Polish forces, only one captain of the dragoons managed to survive, as all other officers perished in the fierce engagement. The aftermath saw internal strife within the ranks, as disputes erupted among the Poles and their allies, each seeking to assign blame for the failure of the assault.

The Cossacks failed to capitalise on their great success. Although the next night they tried to destroy the blockhouse in front of the Polish shanty town, and almost succeeded by attacking it unexpectedly in the dark, the defenders managed to hold out (fighting back with hand grenades) until the cavalry arrived and drove the Cossacks back to their camp.

The next day, on 12 September 1653, during a cannon attack on Ukrainian positions, Tymofiy Khmelnytsky was wounded in the thigh near the armpit. While inspecting the Cossack chants, an enemy cannonball hit the cannon he was standing next to, smashing the carriage and wounding the Cossack commander. Another version of Khmelnytsky's death says that a Cossack defector pointed the siege to Tymosh's green tent. A cannon was aimed at it, hitting a chest with a cannonball, the fragments of which wounded Tymosh (so the enemies said that he died not a soldier's death, but a man's death - "from a cue"). Gangrene began, from which he died on 15 September 1653"according to some sources, four days later, according to others, six days later." On the same day, his death became known in Georghe Stefan's camp, and on 18 October 1653, the Polish camp near Kamianets learned of the incident. In his place, the elders elected Colonel Mykola (or Mykhailo) Fedorovych, allegedly a nobleman by birth (there is also information that he was deposed from the hetmanate for some time by a certain Martyn, but then returned to his position).

Despite the loss of Tymofiy and the prevailing famine, the Cossacks continued to defend themselves. They then elected successive chiefs, first a certain Martyn, then Mikhail Federovich. The starved, exhausted Cossacks expressed their willingness to negotiate the terms of the fortress' surrender after a few weeks. Sebastian Machowski conducted the talks with them on behalf of the Commonwealth. As a result of the negotiations, the Cossacks surrendered their entire Cossack elders to the Poles - 17 representatives of the elders were beheaded by the Poles. On 12 October 1653, the Cossacks appeared on the ramparts in front of the fortress, uttered the words of their oath and officially capitulated. A day later, on honourable terms, with banners outstretched, banging drums, along with a cart containing the body of Tymofiy Khmelnytsky, the Cossacks left the fortress. About 500 of them were slaughtered by Polish troops taking revenge for the massacre after the Battle of Batoh, but most of the Cossack army left Moldavia and returned to Ukraine. Suceava was taken over by George Rakoczy, then in alliance with John Casimir, while Vasile Lupu was soon deprived of the throne of the Moldavian Hospodar.

== Aftermath ==
The attempt of the Khmelnytsky family to enter the world of diplomatic relations with the most important royal courts in Europe came to an end in the Moldavian city of Suceava. As a result of this defeat, Bohdan Khmelnytsky abandoned the Moldavian direction of his policy and began negotiations with Russia, soon placing himself under the protection of the Russian Tsar in the Treaty of Pereyaslav.
