= Siege of Varva =

- Part of The Ruin (Ukrainian history)
Date	1658
Location	Varva, Chernihiv Oblast, (Modern day Ukraine)
Result	Russian victory

Belligerents
Cossack Hetmanate; Crimean Khanate	Russia; Cossack Hetmanate

Commanders and leaders
Ivan Skorobagatko	Grigory Romodanovsky; Ivan Bezpaly

The siege of Varva (Note: Russian: Осада Варвы;Ukrainian: Облога Варви) is one of the events of the Russo-Polish War of 1654-1667 and Ruin in Ukraine.

== Background ==
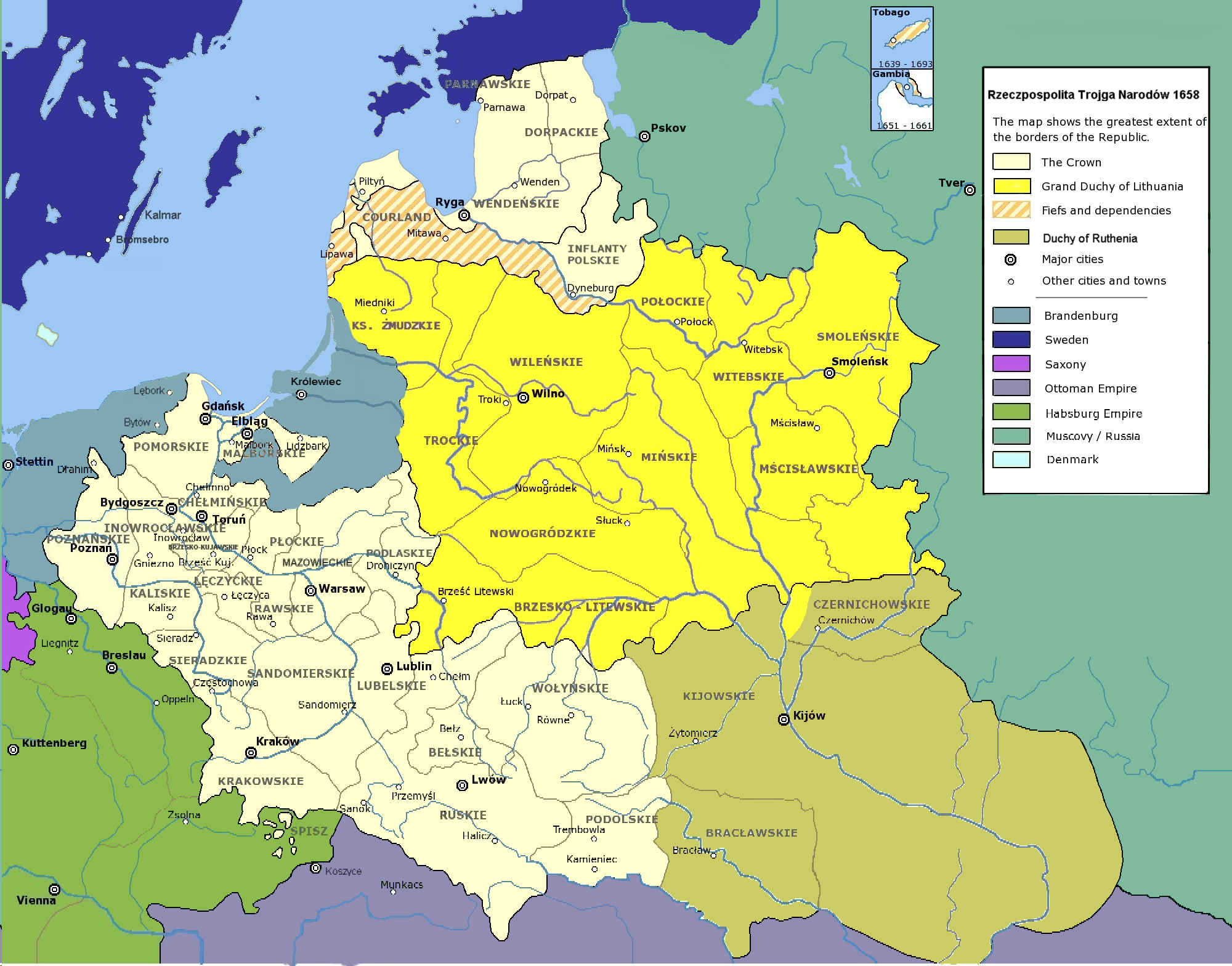
Polish–Lithuanian–Ruthenian Commonwealth as proposed by Treaty of Hadiach in 1658

In September 1658, the Hetman of the Zaporozhian Host Ivan Vyhovsky signed the Treaty of Hadiach with the Polish-Lithuanian Commonwealth, which returned the Zaporozhian Host to the rule of the Polish Crown. Having called upon the troops of the Crimean Khan for help, Vyhovsky began military operations against Russia.

== Siege ==
On the 7th of November, Grigory Romodanovsky and his army arrived at around Varva and started laying siege to the city. However, Varva, due to both a strong cossack garrison and being surrounded with rivers and swamps, was well fortified and as a result the first two assaults of the Russian army were swiftly repelled.

Romodanovsky, seeing the harsh conditions of winter, saw the opportunity to launch another assault once the rivers had frozen. And on the 20th of November, Romadonvosky went into battle against Hetman Skorobogatko in which his army won and Skorobogatko retreated. Later, on the 25th of November a second attempt to defeat Romadonvosky in battle was attempted but a result of the battle, Skorobogatko was defeated and retreated from Varva.

== Consequences ==
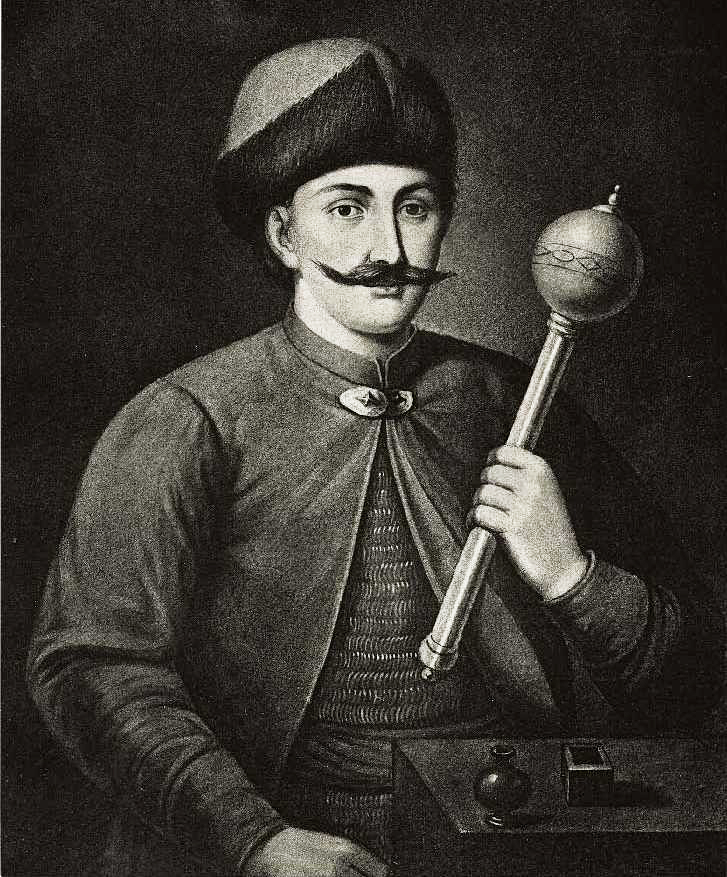
Hetman of Right-Bank Ukraine Ivan Vyhovsky

The oath of the Vygovskites at Varva turned out to be false. Already in December 1658, Vyhovsky changed his word, and military actions began again.
