= Siege of Vinnytsia =

- Part of Khmelnytsky Uprising
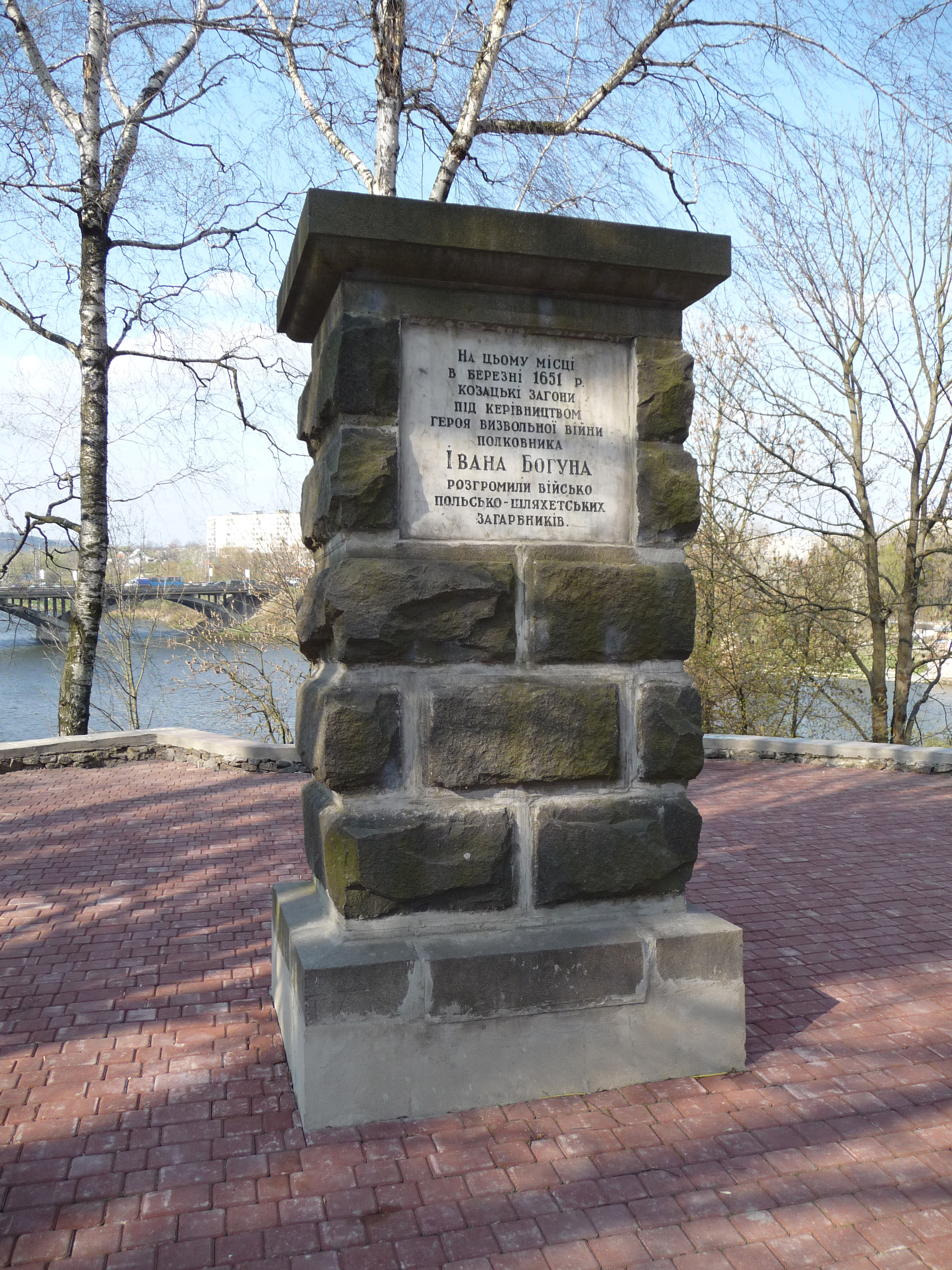
- Memorial on a place of battle in March 1651 in Vinnytsia (Vinnitsa). Ivan Bohun against the Polish army. This place in city is called "Kumbary".
Date	11–20 March 1651
Location	Vinnytsia
Result	Cossack victory

Belligerents
Cossack Hetmanate	Polish–Lithuanian Commonwealth

Commanders and leaders
Ivan Bohun	Marcin Kalinowski

Strength
See § Cossack strength	20,000

Casualties and losses
Unknown	4,500 casualties

The battle of Vinnytsia or siege of Vinnytsia was an armed clash that took place on 11–20 March 1651, during the Khmelnytsky Uprising.

== Prelude ==
In February, the Crown troops led by Marcin Kalinowski began to concentrate in the vicinity of Bar, and then, under the influence of news of peasant uprisings, they moved towards Bracław. At the end of the month, the first major clash took place with the participation of regular units from both sides. Neczay's Cossacks captured Krasne, the Poles retook it, and Danylo Nechay lost his life in battle. Kalinowski quickly captured Jampol.

== Battle ==
On the morning of 11 March 1651, Polish troops led by Marcin Kalinowski and Liantskoroński clashed with Cossacks commanded by Ivan Bohun near Vinnytsia. Bohun employed trickery, taking advantage of ambushes and difficult terrain, which led to heavy losses on the Polish side, including the loss of commanders and banners. The siege of Vinnitsa lasted until 20 March, during which the Cossacks successfully repulsed the attacks, using both fortifications and brilliant tactics. Attempts at negotiation failed, as the Cossacks refused to surrender Bohun and their weapons, and on hearing of incoming aid decided to continue defending. In the end, the Polish army, weakened and lacking in morale, retreated, avoiding total defeat by crossing the Southern Bug.

== Aftermath ==
The defeat of Kalinowski's troops near Vinnytsia against the forces of Ivan Bohun ended the campaign and forced the hetman to withdraw under the wing of the organizing royal army in Volhynia. The Polish army lost 4,500 troops in this battle.

== Cossack strength ==
The number of Cossack troops is somewhat controversial, as some sources give the number as 3,000 soldiers, however, according to Polish historian Sławomir Leśniewski, it was much more than the Crown Army itself, over 20,000 soldiers. Ukrainian historian Oleksandr Paly estimates the Cossack strength at 8,000.
