= Severyn Nalyvaiko =

Historical Ukrainian Cossack leader

Severyn Nalewajko
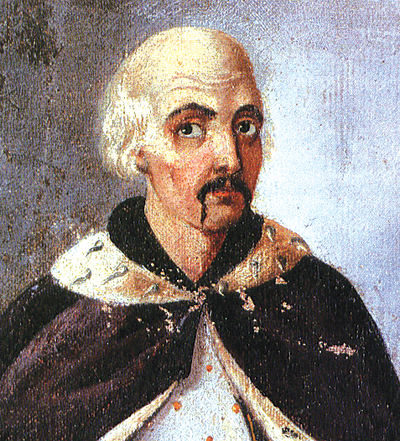

Hetman of Ukrainian Cossacks
- In office 1596–1596
- Preceded by: Hryhory Loboda
- Succeeded by: Petro Konashevych-Sahaidachny

Personal details
- Born: Husiatyn, Kingdom of Poland
- Died: 21 April 1597 Warsaw, Poland

Severyn (Semerii) Nalyvaiko (Ukrainian: Северин (Семерій) Наливайко, Polish: Seweryn Nalewajko, in older historiography also Semen Nalewajko, died 21 April 1597) was a leader of an independent Ukrainian Cossack force who became a hero of Ukrainian folklore. He led the failed Nalyvaiko Uprising against the Polish–Lithuanian Commonwealth for which he was tortured and executed in Warsaw. The Decembrist poet Kondraty Ryleyev wrote a poem about him.

== Biography ==
Nalyvaiko was born in the town of Husiatyn not far from Ternopil into a furrier's family. After the killing of his father by the servants of the magnate Kalinowski he moved with his mother to Ostroh where his elder brother was a seminary student. He later served with the registered Cossacks under Prince Kostiantyn Vasyl Ostrozky in the army of Grand Duchy of Lithuania. In 1593 he fought against the rebellious Zaporozhian Cossacks led by Krzysztof Kosiński during the Kosiński Uprising. He left the service in 1594, and organized a paramilitary unit of unregistered cossacks in the vicinity of Bratslav, and raided several Moldavian and Hungarian towns. The following year, Nalyvaiko's Cossacks were joined by many run-away Ukrainian peasants and captured the town of Lutsk where his men massacred Polish nobles, Catholic clergy and local Greek-Catholics. From Volhynia Nalyvaiko's Cossacks moved into Belarus, where they pillaged Mogilev.

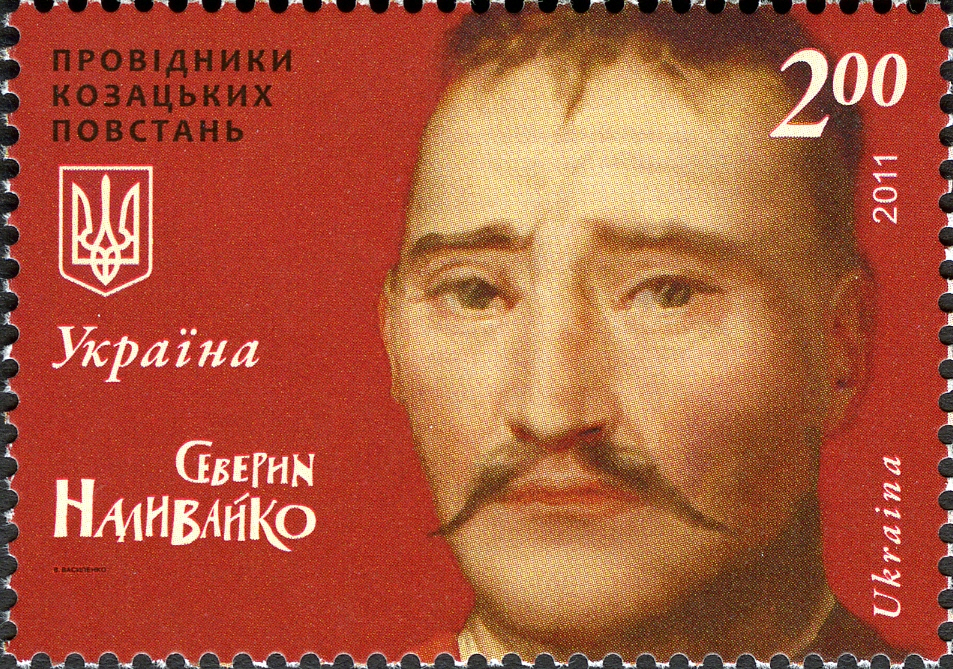
Severyn Nalyvaiko on a 2011 stamp of Ukraine

Nalyvaiko eventually offered peace to the Polish king Sigismund III Vasa, conditioned that the Poles cede the lands between Southern Buh and Dniester rivers south of Bratslav to the Cossacks in exchange for their military service and loyalty to the Polish–Lithuanian Commonwealth. Having refused these terms, the king recalled Stanisław Żółkiewski from Moldavia to quell the Nalyvaiko Uprising, which had engulfed most of Polish crown lands in the regions of parts of modern Ukraine and Belarus.

Nalyvaiko joined his forces with the Cossack Hetman Hryhory Loboda (Polish: Hryhor Łoboda) but was forced to retreat to the Left-bank Ukraine. In May 1596, after Nalyvaiko and Loboda's men constructed a Cossack tabor, a fortified encampment on the banks of the Sula River near the town of Lubny, it was surrounded by Poles. The Cossacks fought for two weeks at the Battle of Lubny before running out of food and water. Fierce disagreements between Nalyvaiko and Loboda's men as to the terms of a proposed surrender saw the beheading of Loboda. After Loboda's men elected a new hetman, Stepan Krempsky, they handed over Severyn Nalyvaiko to the Poles in exchange for their own lives. After the Cossack's surrender Polish forces attacked the tabor, resulting in a massacre of those who were unable to escape.

Nalyvaiko was brought to Warsaw in a cage and publicly quartered. There were contemporary stories about him being crowned with a white-hot iron crown or boiled alive in a copper cauldron, but they are not verified by factual evidence.

== Legacy ==
After his death, Nalyvaiko became a hero of Ukrainian folklore. Though a controversial figure in his own time, he was heroized by the Cossack chroniclers of the 18th century. However, he was little known in historical writing, whether Ukrainian, Russian, or Western, until the 1820s. The details of Nalyvaiko's life became better known with the coming to light of the anonymous History of the Ruthenians, which depicts Nalyvaiko as a national hero of the Cossacks. The Russian poet Kondraty Ryleyev—one of the organizers of the failed Decembrist revolt of 1825—wrote an unfinished verse novel titled Nalyvaiko; an excerpt titled "The Confession of Nalyvaiko" was published a few months before the uprising. According to historian Serhii Plokhy, Ryleyev's work made Nalyvaiko "a symbol of Cossack freedom, courage, and patriotism" and "inspired generations of revolutionaries and freethinkers in the Russian Empire." The Ukrainian thinker Mykhailo Drahomanov stated that, in the 1850s, "The Confession of Nalyvaiko was copied in our secret notebooks along with the works of [Ukrainian poet Taras] Shevchenko and was read with equal zeal." Shevchenko also glorified Nalyvaiko in his works. In the Soviet period, the Ukrainian author Ivan Le wrote a novel about Nalyvaiko.

== See also ==
- Hetman of Zaporizhian Cossacks
