= Military career of Ivan Sirko =

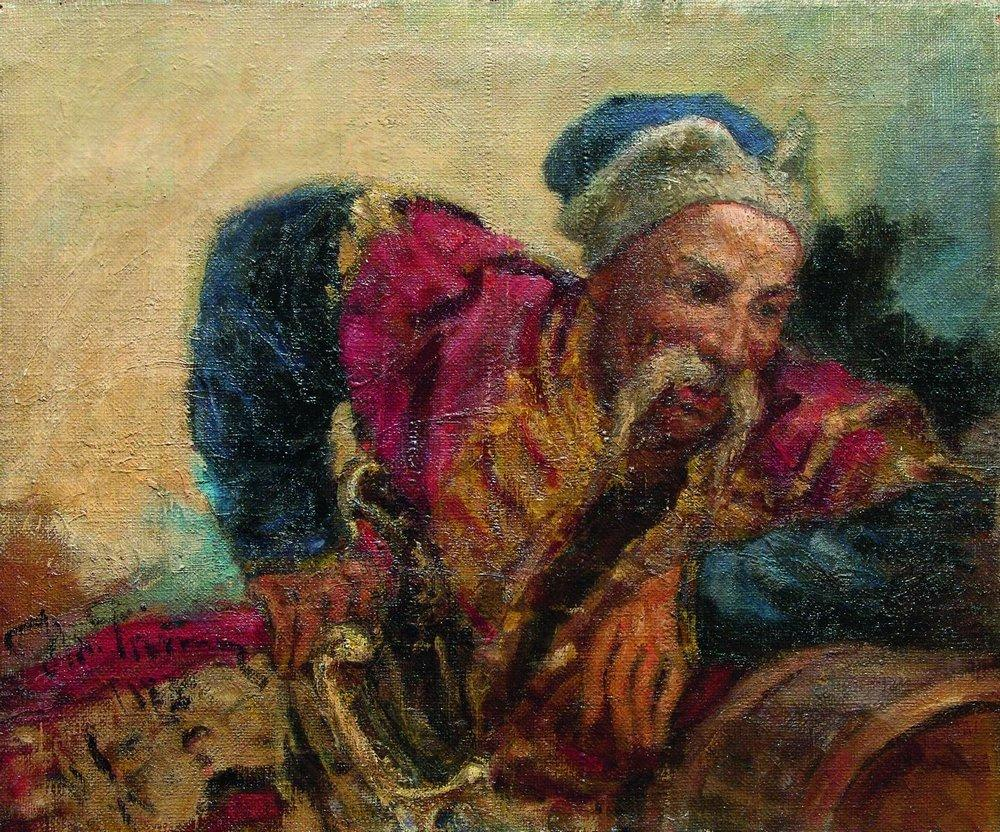
Ivan Sirko by Ilya Repin

The Military career of Ivan Sirko spanned for nearly 60 years. He led the Zaporozhian Cossack army first as Polkovnyk (Colonel) and later as Kosh Otaman, position to which he was re-elected at least 8 times. Sirko's exploits against the Ottoman Empire and Crimean Khanate gained attention of entire Europe. He later became an inspiration and key figure of Ilya Repin's Reply of the Zaporozhian Cossacks. Ivan Sirko was particularly memorized in poems and literature. In Ukraine, Sirko is considered to be a legendary folk hero.

Ivan Sirko's military career is legendary. According to historian Dmytro Yavornytsky, Sirko led 55 campaigns during his career and never lost a battle. Recent research allows to increase number of Sirko's battles and campaigns, but Sirko wasn't confirmed to have suffered a defeat in any of them. Only Polish sources claim Sirko suffered 3 defeats in battle. New sources put Sirko's military record at over 65 victories in battles.

== Military record ==
Opponent flags

Ottoman Empire	Crimean Khanate	Nogai/Budjak Horde	(Polish–Lithuanian Commonwealth) Poland-Lithuania	Tsardom of Russia	Wallachia	Moldavia	Spanish Empire	Rival Cossacks

Results

Favorable result Uncertain result Unfavorable result

Summary (Incomplete)Overviews of clashes
№	Clash(es)	Date(s)	Location(s)	Conflict(s)	Type(s)	Opponent(s)	Result
1.	Cossack raid on Istanbul (1620)	Late 1620	Istanbul	Cossack raids	Raid	(Ottoman Empire)	Victory
2.	Raid on Varna	25 August 1620	Varna, Bulgaria	Cossack raids	Raid	(Ottoman Empire)	Victory
3.	Raid on Perekop	Late 1620	Perekop	Cossack raids	Raid	no	Victory
4.	Battle of Khotyn (1621)	2 September – 9 October 1621	Khotyn	Polish–Ottoman War (1620–1621)	Open Battle	(Ottoman Empire)	Victory
5.	Cossack raid on Istanbul (1629)	1629	Istanbul	Cossack raids	Raid	(Ottoman Empire)	Victory
6.	Siege of Azov (1637–1642)	21 April 1637 – 30 April 1642	Azov Fortress	Cossack raids	Defensive Siege	(Ottoman Empire)	Military victory
7.	Siege of Dunkirk (1646) (?)	7 September – 11 October 1646	Dunkirk	Thirty Years' War, Eighty Years' War	Siege	(Spanish Empire)	Victory
8.	Battle of Zhovti Vody	29 April – 16 May 1648	Zhovti Vody	Khmelnytsky Uprising	Open Battle	(Polish–Lithuanian Commonwealth)	Victory
9.	Battle of Korsuń	25–26 May 1648	Korsuń	Khmelnytsky Uprising	Open Battle	(Polish–Lithuanian Commonwealth)	Victory
10.	Battle of Pyliavtsi	21–23 September 1648	Pyliavtsi	Khmelnytsky Uprising	Open Battle	(Polish–Lithuanian Commonwealth)	Victory
11.	Battle of Zboriv (1649)	15–16 August 1649	Zboriv	Khmelnytsky Uprising	Open Battle	(Polish–Lithuanian Commonwealth)	Disputed
12.	Battle of Batih	1–2 June 1652	Batih	Khmelnytsky Uprising	Open Battle	(Polish–Lithuanian Commonwealth)	Victory
13.	Siege of Zhvanets	September – 16 December 1653	Zhvanets	Khmelnytsky Uprising	Siege	(Polish–Lithuanian Commonwealth)	Disputed
14.	Podolia clashes	December 1653	Podolia	Crimean–Nogai raids	Open Battle	no	Victory
15.	Siege of Uman (1654)	2–4 April 1654	Uman	Khmelnytsky Uprising	Defensive Siege	(Polish–Lithuanian Commonwealth)	Victory
16.	Siege of Uman (1655)	14–19 January 1655	Uman	Khmelnytsky Uprising, Russo-Polish War (1654–1667)	Defensive Siege	(Polish–Lithuanian Commonwealth)	Victory
17.	Raid on Azov	1655	Azov Fortress	Cossack raids, Sirko's campaigns	Raid	(Ottoman Empire)	Victory
18.	Raid on Ochakov	1655	Ochakov	Cossack raids, Sirko's campaigns	Raid	(Ottoman Empire)	Victory
19.	Blockade of Kerch	6 July – 14 September 1655	Kerch Strait	Cossack raids, Sirko's campaigns	Blockade	(Ottoman Empire)	Victory
20.	Anti–Vyhovsky campaign	August 1659	Nogai uluses, Akkerman, Ukraine	Cossack raids, Sirko's campaigns, Polish–Russian War (1654–1667)	Campaign	(Polish–Lithuanian Commonwealth) (Ottoman Empire)	Victory
21.	Ochakiv–Aslan campaign	April 1660	Ochakov, Aslan-Kermen	Cossack raids, Sirko's campaigns	Campaign	(Ottoman Empire)	Victory
22.	Battle of Igren	Summer 1660	Igren Peninsula, Samara River	Crimean–Nogai raids	Open Battle	no	Victory
23.	Raid on Danube	1663	Danube	Cossack raids, Sirko's campaigns	Raid	(Ottoman Empire)	Victory
24.	Raid on Ochakov	1663	Ochakov	Cossack raids, Sirko's campaigns	Raid	(Ottoman Empire)	Victory
25.	Siege of Perekop (1663)	11 October – 16 December 1663	Perekop	Cossack raids, Sirko's campaigns	Defensive Siege	(Ottoman Empire)	Victory
26.	Siege of Buzhin	7–13 April 1664	Buzhin, Right-Bank Ukraine	Polish–Russian War (1654–1667)	Siege	(Polish–Lithuanian Commonwealth)	Victory
27.	Battle of Pavoloch	April 1664	Pavoloch	Polish–Russian War (1654–1667)	Open Battle	(Polish–Lithuanian Commonwealth)	Inconclusive
28.	Siege of Cherkasy	April 1664	Cherkasy	Polish–Russian War (1654–1667)	Defensive Siege	(Polish–Lithuanian Commonwealth)	Inconclusive
29.	Battle of Kapustyana Dolyna	April 1664	Kapustyana Dolyna, Right-Bank Ukraine	Polish–Russian War (1654–1667)	Open Battle	(Polish–Lithuanian Commonwealth)	Victory
30.	Raid on Budjak	June 1664	Budjak	Cossack raids, Sirko's campaigns	Raid		Victory
31.	Battle of Saradzhin (1664)	July 1664	Saradzhinsky Forest, Right-Bank Ukraine	Polish–Russian War (1654–1667)	Open Battle	(Polish–Lithuanian Commonwealth)	Withdrew
32.	1st Crimean Campaign (1664)	1664	Crimea	Cossack raids, Sirko's campaigns	Campaign	no	Victory
33.	2nd Crimean Campaign (1664)	1664	Crimea	Cossack raids, Sirko's campaigns	Campaign	no	Victory
34.	Attack on Dnieper	1665	Dnieper	Cossack raids, Sirko's campaigns	Raid	(Ottoman Empire)	Victory
35.	Crimean Campaign (1667)	October 1667	Crimea	Cossack raids, Sirko's campaigns	Campaign	no	Victory
36.	Sloboda–Dnieper campaign	4 March – May 1668	Sloboda, Dnieper Ukraine	Left-bank Uprising	Campaign	Oryol ship	Inconclusive
37.	Siege of Kharkiv	March 1668	Kharkiv	Left-bank Uprising	Siege	Oryol ship	Withdrew
38.	Battle of Okhtyrka	March 1668	Okhtyrka	Left-bank Uprising	Open Battle	Oryol ship	Victory
39.	Battle of Poltava	March 1668	Poltava	Left-bank Uprising	Open Battle	Oryol ship	Victory
40.	Raid on Borovoe	April 1668	Borovoe, Dnieper Ukraine	Left-bank Uprising	Raid	Oryol ship	Victory
41.	Raid on Kolontaiv	May 1668	Kolontaiv, Dnieper Ukraine	Left-bank Uprising	Raid	Oryol ship	Victory
42.	Raid on Martova	May 1668	Martova, Dnieper Ukraine	Left-bank Uprising	Raid	Oryol ship	Victory
43.	1st Crimean Campaign (1668)	October 1668	Crimea	Cossack raids, Sirko's campaigns	Campaign	no	Victory
44.	2nd Crimean Campaign (1668)	October 1668	Crimea	Cossack raids, Sirko's campaigns	Campaign	no	Victory
45.	3rd Crimean Campaign (1668)	October 1668	Crimea	Cossack raids, Sirko's campaigns	Campaign	no	Victory
46.	4th Crimean Campaign (1668)	November 1668	Crimea	Cossack raids, Sirko's campaigns	Campaign	no	Victory
47.	Battle of Olkhovets	December 1668 – January 1669	Olkhovets, near Chyhyryn	The Ruin	Open Battle	no	Victory
48.	Siege of Ochakov (1670)	20 June 1670	Ochakov	Cossack raids, Sirko's campaigns	Siege	(Ottoman Empire)	Victory
49.	Raid on Budjak	September 1671	Budjak	Cossack raids, Sirko's campaigns	Raid		Victory
50.	Raid on Tighina	September 1671	Tighina	Cossack raids, Sirko's campaigns	Raid	(Ottoman Empire)	Victory
51.	Battle of Kuialnyk	Early 1672	Kuialnyk	Cossack raids, Sirko's campaigns	Open Battle	(Ottoman Empire)	Victory
52.	Eastern campaign	May 1673	Northern Ottoman lands, Crimea, Budjak	Cossack raids, Sirko's campaigns	Campaign	(Ottoman Empire)	Victory
53.	Sack of Tighina	9 October 1673	Tighina	Cossack raids, Sirko's campaigns	Raid	(Ottoman Empire)	Victory
54.	Battle of Sich (1674)	19 December 1674	Zaporozhian Sich	Sirko's campaigns, Russo-Turkish War (1672–1681)	Open Battle	(Ottoman Empire)	Victory
55.	Crimean campaign (1675)	23 – 29 September 1675	Crimea	Cossack raids, Sirko's campaigns, Russo-Turkish War (1672–1681)	Campaign	(Ottoman Empire)	Victory
56.	Chyhyryn campaign (1678)	8 July – 18 August 1678	Dnieper	Cossack raids, Sirko's campaigns, Russo-Turkish War (1672–1681)	Raid	(Ottoman Empire)	Ottoman retreat and deterrence
57.	Raid on Ochakov	1679	Ochakov	Cossack raids, Sirko's campaigns	Raid	(Ottoman Empire)	Victory
58.	Raid on Islam-Kermen	1679	Islam-Kermen	Cossack raids, Sirko's campaigns	Raid	(Ottoman Empire)	Victory
59.	Raid on Kyzy-Kermen	1679	Kyzy-Kermen	Cossack raids, Sirko's campaigns	Raid	(Ottoman Empire)	Victory
60.	Stand on Sich	August 1679	Zaporozhian Sich	Cossack raids, Sirko's campaigns	Standoff	(Ottoman Empire)	Victory

== Bibliography ==
- Sobchenko, Ivan (2020). Kosh Otaman of Zaporozhian Sich I.D. Sirko (in Russian). Moscow: Ваш формат.
- Mytsyk; Plokhiy; Storozhenko, Y. A.; S. M.; I. S (1990). How the Cossacks Fought (in Ukrainian). Дніпропетровськ: Промінь. ISBN 5-7775-0334-9.
- Paly, Alexander (2017). Історія України (in Ukrainian). Vol. 3. Kyiv: К.І.С. ISBN 978-617-684-166-1.
- Коляда, І.А. (2012). Отаман Сірко (in Ukrainian). Kharkiv: Folio. ISBN 978-966-03-5804-1.
- Yavornytskyi, Dmytro (2004). Tvory. Vol. 1. Tandem-U. ISBN 966-7482-31-6.
- Smoliy, V. (1994). Володарі гетьманської булави: Іст. портрети. Kyiv: Варта. ISBN 5-203-01639-9.
