= Crimean campaigns (1668) =

- Part of The Ruin and Cossack raids
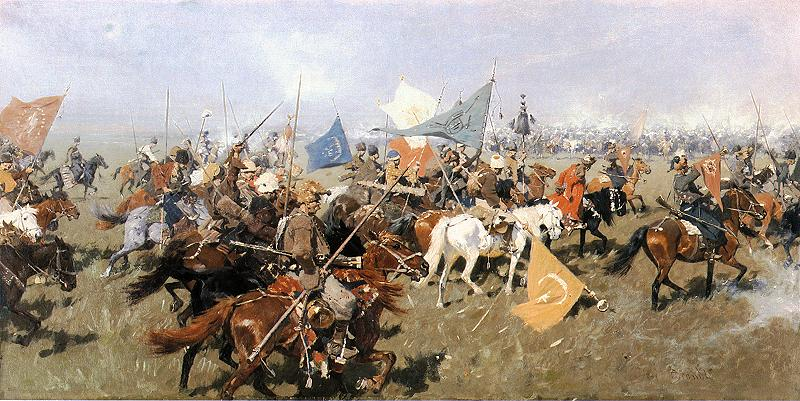
- Returning of the Cossacks
| Date | October – November 1668 |
| Location | Crimea |
| Result | Cossack victory Full results: 1st campaign – Cossack victory; 2nd campaign – Cossack victory; 3rd campaign – Cossack victory; 4th campaign – Cossack-Kalmyk victory |
| Territorial changes | Devastation of Bakhchysarai and Crimea |

Belligerents
| Sirko's Cossacks; 4th campaign: Don Cossacks; Kalmyk Khanate | Crimean Khanate |

Commanders and leaders
| Ivan Sirko; Ivan Zhdan-Rih | Adil Giray; Shirin Bey |

Strength
| Unknown | Unknown |

Casualties and losses
| Unknown | 3rd campaign: 3,000+ killed 500+ captured Other campaigns: Heavy |

The Crimean campaigns were carried by the Zaporozhian Cossacks and their Don-Kalmyk allies against the Crimean Khanate, consisting of total 4 successful campaigns into Crimea led by Ivan Sirko, on October–November 1668.

== Prelude ==
After Sirko's Sloboda–Dnieper campaign, he was in Chyhyryn with Doroshenko during September–October 1668. Sirko reorganised his Cossack army and fought against Russian Tsarist forces in Sloboda Ukraine. Doroshenko later requested Sirko to raid Crimea to disrupt Tatar support for his rival Petro Sukhovy and create favourable conditions for negotiating with Tatars, which Sirko accepted.

== Campaigns ==
In October, Ivan Sirko organised first campaign together with Ivan Zhdan-Rih. Cossacks inflictived heavy losses on Tatars and plundered several settlements, including Kaffa. Second campaign was also successful. During the third campaign, Cossacks killed or captured 3,500 Tatars.

On November 9, Doroshenko stated about Sirko's activities: "We hereby inform you that, having heard about such a desire of the grassroots army to crush the Tatar uluses, we sent several thousand troops with cannons and a good leader, Mr. Ivan Sirko, to fight in the Tatar land." In early December, Russian ambassadors also mentioned Sirko's activities: "Hetman Doroshenko sent Sirko with various people to the Crimea to make a mess there".

Ivan Sirko launched his fourth campaign, jointly with the Don Cossacks and Kalmyks to attack Bakhchysarai. This was reportedly done by the order of Tsar. Sirko returned to the Sich after his campaign.

== Aftermath ==
On January 19, 1669, boyar Petro Sheremetyev reported: "There are five thousand Cossacks of different regiments waiting for spring: if Sirko goes to Crimea again, they will go with him". Sirko was going to fight Tatars again, but this time in Ukraine itself with Doroshenko. Sirko's campaigns inflicted heavy losses on Tatars, with Tatars now willing to negotiate with Doroshenko. However, the conditions for peace were dissatisfying for both sides and the conflict continued. Major battle took place between Doroshenko and Sirko against Sukhovy with his Tatar allies during Siege of Chyhyryn.

== See also ==
- Crimean campaign (1575)
- Battle of Kaffa (1616)
- Crimean campaign (1667)
