= Ivan Sirko =

Ukrainian Cossack military leader

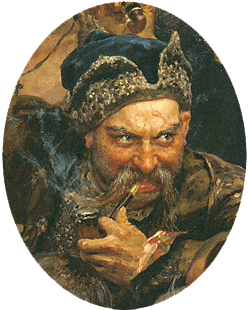
- An imaginary representation of Sirko by Ilya Repin
- Born: 1605; Merefa, Sloboda Ukraine, Tsardom of Russia or Murafa, Bracław Voivodeship, Polish-Lithuanian Commonwealth
- Died: August 11, 1680 (aged 74–75); Hrushivka, Zaporozhian Host
- Spouse: Sofia
- Children: 4
- Military career
- Allegiance: Zaporozhian Host; Zaporozhian Sich; Left-bank Ukraine
- Service years: 1620–1680
- Rank: Kosh Otaman; Hetman (Honorary)
- Nicknames: Urus Shaitan (Russian Devil); Kharakternyk; Zaporozhian Bogatyr
- Conflicts: See list: Polish–Ottoman War (1620–1621); Cossack raid on Istanbul (1620); Raid on Varna; Battle of Khotyn (1621); Thirty Years' War; Siege of Dunkirk (1646) (?); Khmelnytsky Uprising; Khmelnytsky's campaign; Battle of Zhovti Vody; Battle of Korsun; Battle of Pyliavtsi; Battle of Zboriv (1649); Battle of Batih; Siege of Zhvanets; Siege of Uman (1654); Russo-Polish War (1654–1667); Tsar Alexei's campaign of 1654–1655; Siege of Uman (1655); Bohun Uprising; Right-bank uprising; Siege of Buzhin (1664); Battle of Saradzhin (1664); The Ruin; Left-bank uprising; Sloboda–Dnieper campaign; Sich-Tsardom Crisis; Polish–Cossack–Tatar War; Russo-Turkish War (1672–1681); Chyhyryn campaign (1676); Chyhyryn campaign (1677); Chyhyryn campaign (1678); Stand on the Sich (1679); Cossack raids; Cossack raid on Istanbul (1629); Siege of Azov (1637–1642); Sirko's campaigns; Crimean blockade (1655); Ochakiv–Aslan campaign; Battle of Igren; Siege of Perekop (1663); Crimean campaign (1667); Crimean campaigns (1668); Siege of Chyhyryn (1668–1669); Siege of Ochakiv (1670); Battle of Kuialnyk; Sirko's Eastern campaign; Battle of Sich (1674); Crimean campaign (1675); Capture of Bakhchysarai

Ivan Dmytrovych Sirko (Note: Ukrainian: Іван Дмитрович Сірко [iˈwɑn ˈdmɪtrowɪtʃ s⁽ʲ⁾irˈkɔ]; Russian: Иван Дмитриевич Серко, romanized: Ivan Dmitriyevich Serko [ɪˈvan ˈdmʲitrʲɪjɪvʲɪtɕ sʲɪrˈko]; Polish: Iwan Sierko [ˈivan ˈɕɛrkɔ]; Romanian: Ioan Sircu [iˈo̯an ˈsirku].) (c. 1605 – August 11, 1680) was a Zaporozhian Cossack military leader, Koshovyi Otaman of the Zaporozhian Sich and putative co-author of the famous semi-legendary Cossack letter to the Ottoman sultan that inspired the major painting Reply of the Zaporozhian Cossacks by the 19th-century artist Ilya Repin. He was undefeated in battle and during his career gained fame all over Europe for his exploits against the Ottoman Empire and Crimean Khanate.

== Early life and origin ==
The first biography of Ivan Sirko, written by Dmytro Yavornytsky in 1890, gave Sirko's place of birth as the sloboda of Merefa near the modern-day city of Kharkiv. Historian Yuriy Mytsyik states that this could not be the case. In his book Otaman Ivan Sirko (1999) he writes that Merefa was established only in 1658 (more than 40 years after the birth of the future Otaman). The author also notes that Sirko later in his life did actually live in Merefa with his family on his own estate, and according to some earlier local chronicles there even existed a small settlement called Sirkivka. However, Mytsyik also points out that in 1658–1660 Sirko served as a colonel of the Kalnyk Polk (a military and administrative division of the Cossack Hetmanate) in Podilia, a position usually awarded to the representative of a local population. The author also gives a reference to the letter of Ivan Samiylovych to kniaz G. Romodanovsky (the Tsar's voyevoda) in which the Hetman refers to Sirko as one born in Polish lands instead of in Sloboda Ukraine (part of Tsardom of Russia). Mytsyik also recalls that another historian, Volodymyr Borysenko, allowed for the possibility that Sirko was born in Murafa near the city of Sharhorod (now in Vinnytsia Oblast). The author explains during that time when people were fleeing the war (known as the Ruin, 1659–1686) they may have established a similarly named town in Sloboda Ukraine further east.

Further, Mytsyik in his book states that Sirko probably was not of Cossack heritage, but rather of the Ukrainian (Ruthenian) Orthodox szlachta. Mytsyik points out that a local Podilian nobleman, Wojciech Sirko, married a certain Olena Kozynska sometime in 1592. Also in official letters the Polish administration referred to Sirko as urodzonim, implying a native-born Polish subject. Mytsyik states that Sirko stood about 174–176 cm tall and had a birthmark on the right side of the lower lip, a detail which Ilya Repin failed to depict in his artwork when he used General Dragomirov as a model of Otaman Sirko. Mytsyik also recalls the letter of the Field Hetman of the Crown John III Sobieski (later king of Poland) which referred to Sirko as:

A very quiet, noble, polite [man], and has ... great trust among Cossacks.

According to Ivan Sobchenko, Sirko's father was Dmitry Sirko, which correlates with Ivan Sirko's patronymic name (Dmytrovych). Sobchenko states that Dmitry Sirko was a Ukrainian Cossack from Murafa, elected as ataman of Murafa sotnia of the Bratslav regiment. Ivan Sirko was born in nobility before his family lost its right to gentry.

It's generally accepted that Ivan Sirko was of Ukrainian ethnicity. However, Paul Robert Magocsi states in his book that Ivan Sirko was a Ukrainian Cossack of Moldavian origin. Sirko's father is identified as a Ukrainian of either Ruthenian or Cossack Orthodox nobility. Sirko's mother is identified as a native of Podolia, but information about her exact ethnic background is scarce, possibly having Moldavian origin.

== Sotnik ==
=== Raids on Varna & Perekop ===
In 1620, Sirko held the rank of Sotnik, taking part in his first recorded campaign against the Ottomans. He led his detachment of Cossacks in a campaign against Varna, sacking it. Afterwards, he raided Crimean city of Perekop.

=== Battle of Khotyn 1621 ===
In 1621, Ukrainian Cossack Hetman, Petro Sahaidachny gathered an army of Zaporozhian Cossacks against the Ottoman army that threatened the Polish-Lithuanian Commonwealth, along with other regions. Sirko with his detachment took part in the Battle of Khotyn, inflicting heavy losses on Ottoman Janissaries.

=== Raid on Istanbul 1629 ===
In 1629, Sirko took part in a raid on Istanbul organized by Bohdan Khmelnytsky, the future Ukrainian Cossack Hetman. Cossacks ravaged Turkish villages in vicinity of Istanbul and took large amount of loot during the raid.

=== Siege of Azov ===
In 1637, Sirko took part in the capture of Azov fortress by the Zaporozhian and Don Cossacks. Cossacks defeated the Ottoman Janissaries and captured the Azov fortress. Don Cossacks remained in Azov, while Zaporozhian Cossacks returned to the Sich with loot and captives.

Sirko later joined the Azov garrison which had 700 Zaporozhian Cossacks among them, which later grew to 1,000 Zaporozhians. Zaporozhian and Don Cossacks defended Azov from Ottoman attacks in 1641.

== Colonel ==
=== Thirty Years' War ===
In 1644, Sirko appears in historical sources as Polkovnyk (Colonel) of Vinnytsia. Ukrainian and some French historians mention involvement of 2,000–2,500 Zaporozhian Cossacks led by Ivan Sirko during the Siege of Dunkirk in 1646.

=== Khmelnytsky Uprising ===
Sirko supported Bohdan Khmelnytsky during the uprising against the Polish-Lithuanian Commonwealth and took an active part in it. He distinguished himself at the Battles of Zhovti Vody, Korsun, Pyliavtsi, Zboriv, Batih and Zhvanets.

=== Chortomlyk Sich ===
Sirko changed his political orientation several times. In 1654, he initially opposed the alliance with Moscow during the Pereyaslav Rada, departing to Chortomlyk Sich to protect the southern borders of Ukraine from Crimean-Nogai raids.

In 1655, Sirko launched a campaign into Crimea to thwart planned Tatar campaign into Ukraine. Together with the Don Cossacks, he captured Taman Peninsula, an important strategic point that controlled the Kerch Strait. Cossacks kept the Azov Sea locked for two months and the population in terror.

== Kosh Otaman ==
=== Russo-Polish War ===
In 1659, he was elected as Kosh Otaman of the Zaporizhian Host, allying with Tsardom of Russia. Together with the Russian Prince Trubetski fought against the Crimean Khanate. In 1660, he launched a major campaign against the Ottoman fortresses of Ochakiv and Aslam-Kermen. He took large number of captives during both campaigns. Sirko defeated Tatars in a major battle on Igren Peninsula, freeing 15,000 Christian slaves.

In 1663, together with Tsarist and Kalmyk troops, he inflicted a heavy defeat on Tatars and Ottoman Janissaries during the Siege of Perekop, ravaging many Tatar settlements and taking large number of captives, forcing the Crimean Khanate to reduce their support to Poland-Lithuania. In 1664, he was one of the inspirators of an uprising in Right-bank Ukraine against Poland which is known from his letter to the Tsar.

=== Career ===
Sirko has been elected by the Cossacks as Kosh Otaman 8 times. He was the first Cossack Otaman to ally with Kalmyks against Tatars. Sirko was respected by Kalmyks, stating they only wanted to participate in his campaigns. In October 1667, Sirko launched a campaign against the Crimean Khanate, during which he sacked Kaffa. He freed 2,000 Christian slaves, while taking thousands of Tatars as captives. This campaign caused so much panic in Crimea that Khan Adil Giray took refuge in Anatolia.

Despite his pro-Moscow orientation, he distrusted and hated pro-Russian Hetman Ivan Briukhovetsky, but at the same time married his son Roman to Briukhovetsky's daughter. In 1668, this rivalry even forced Ivan Sirko to switch sides again and briefly join Petro Doroshenko in his fight against "Muscovite boyars and Voivodes" during Left-Bank Uprising, where he notably fought the Russian Tsarist forces during his campaign, but in 1670, once again Sirko pledged loyalty to the Tsar. Sirko besieged Ochakiv and Ismail, capturing these Ottoman strongholds.

Sirko played an important role in Cossack campaigns and raids against the Crimean Khanate, Nogai Horde and Ottoman Empire. Sirko put emphasis on taking Turks, Tatars and other Muslim peoples as captives during Cossack campaigns and raids. Jews were also recorded to have been targeted by Cossack raids. Captives taken during their campaigns and raids could be used for ransom or sold into slavery to various states. Sirko's campaigns and raids were so problematic, that Sultan Mehmed IV issued a firman to the mosques to pray for the death of Ivan Sirko.

Following the death of Demian Mnohohrishny in 1672, Sirko entered the struggle for the Hetman title, but was exiled by the Russian Tsar to Tobolsk, Siberia. However, Mehmed IV took advantage of the absence of Ivan Sirko, in spring the 300,000-strong Ottoman army crossed the Danube and invaded Podolia. Ottomans threatened to devastate not only Ukraine, but also the Polish-Lithuanian Commonwealth and Tsardom of Russia. Sirko's absence eased the pressure of the Turkish-Tatar aggression to such an extent that they felt permissive.

=== Russo-Turkish War ===
In 1673, Russian Tsar returned Sirko back to Ukraine, reportedly at the request of John III Sobieski and other European states concerned about the growing Ottoman threat. Sirko once again fought against Tatars and Turks. He captured the Arslan fortress, and for the second time captured Ochakiv. He sacked Tighina, massacring or enslaving all inhabitants. Same year, he launched a campaign against the Crimean Khanate, Nogai Horde and Ottoman Empire. Author of History of Ruthenians described his campaign in Crimea:

Landing on the shores of Karasubazar, he captured and ravaged all the coastal cities, and then, having passed through the whole Crimea to the city of Or [Qapı] or Perekop, he joined with his cavalry there and continued the devastation of the Tatars in their villages. This way, taking revenge on the Tatars for their offenses in a hundredfold manner, he returned to the Sich with countless loot.

False son of Tsar Alexi, "Tsarevich" Simeon, came to Sich in 1673, after the defeat of Razin's Revolt. Simeon told Ivan Sirko, that after he escaped from a plot against him in Moscow, he had joined Stenka Razin's Cossacks and secretly supported their rebellion, before coming to Sich with Ataman Ivan Miiuska. Thereafter he planned to go in secret to Kyiv, and then to the Polish King. However, Sirko later sent the impersonator to Moscow, where he was executed a year later.

In 1674, when the rivers froze, Turkish-Tatar forces launched a campaign into Ukraine. The campaign was unsuccessful, Turkish-Tatar troops were forced to retreat after suffering heavy losses. Sirko wanted revenge for the attack, this inspired his Crimean campaign in 1675. During the campaign, he sacked the capital of the Crimean Khanate, Bakhchysarai. He freed 7,000 Christian slaves, while taking thousands of Tatars and Turks as captives. However, Sirko discovered that 3,000 of the freed Christian slaves wanted to go back to Crimea, a lot of whom actually converted to Islam, so he ordered their execution. After execution, Sirko is quoted to have said:

Brothers, forgive me, but it is better that you should lie here awaiting the terrible judgment of God than go back to Crimea to help them [Tatars] increase in numbers and risk the eternal damnation of your souls.

Despite Sirko's brutality during warfare and towards those he viewed as traitors; Tatars respected him for his fairness during the times of peace. Hetman Samoylovych complained to Otaman Sirko for allowing Tatar herds to graze on Cossack land. Ivan Sirko replied to Samoylovych:

Lord Hetman, if myself would help people in their dire need, it is not well to look down on that. There is a saying that need changes law. We and the Tartars are neighbours and help each other in a neighbourly way.

In 1676, the Zaporozhian Cossacks defeated Ottoman army in a major battle, however, the Ottoman Sultan Mehmed IV still demanded that the Cossacks submit to Turkish rule. Cossacks led by Ivan Sirko replied in an uncharacteristic manner: they wrote a letter, replete with insults and profanities, which later became the subject of a painting by Ilya Repin. Doroshenko resigned and offered the Hetman's insignia to Sirko, which he accepted.

Sirko launched frequent attacks on Turkish-Tatar forces, which helped to halt Turkish-Tatar advance into Right-Bank Ukraine in 1678. Despite capturing Chyhyryn during the campaign, Turkish-Tatar forces were soon forced to abandon it, after being weakened by the fighting and constant raids of Ivan Sirko.

In 1679, he set out to "scare the entire Crimea". The brave men then devastated a number of settlements and reached as far as Bakhchiserai. The Khan apparently escaped to the mountains. Having freed many prisoners, the Cossacks returned with the loot to Zaporozhye. After a series of defeats suffered by the Turkish-Tatar forces against Zaporozhian Cossacks, Sirko with Cossacks sent a reply to Crimean Khan Murad Giray. They wrote:

Do not bother to attack us again. This time, you are not coming to us, we are coming to you. We captured Trabzon and Sinop, we turned the Asian coast upside down; we cauterized the flanks of Belgrade, we wiped out Varna, Izmail and many Danube fortresses from the map. As the heirs of the old Zaporizhians, we follow their footsteps. We do not want to argue with you, if we see your provocations again, we will not hesitate to come again.

Sirko repelled the second invasion of Sich of Turkish-Tatar army. Later, he fell ill and retired from Sich to the village of Hrushivka.

== Burial ==
Sirko family coat-of-arms.

Sirko died at his estate Hrushivka (today Dnipro Raion, Dnipropetrovsk Oblast) on August 11 [Julian August 1], 1680. Next day he was buried near the Chortomlyk Sich. In 1709 the Moscow Army totally destroyed the Sich and the grave of the Otaman Sirko was not fixed until 1734. The Cossacks replaced the broken cross with a memorial rock that has survived to the present, but they erroneously marked the date of his death as May 4. On November 1967, the Kakhovka Reservoir was threatening the Otaman Sirko's burial site, causing him to be reburied near the village of Kapulivka, Nikopol Raion, but without his skull. Sirko's skull was sent to the Moscow laboratory of the sculptor Mikhail Gerasimov, who aimed to recreate the portrait of the legendary Otaman. It was not until 1987 when writer Yuriy Mushketyk remembered the 'Beheaded Otaman' and wrote a letter to the Association for Preservation of History and Culture of Ukraine. On July 15, 1990 the member of parliament from Rukh, Volodymyr Yavorivsky called for Sirko's skull to be brought back from Moscow. The journal Pamyatky Ukrainy (Attractions of Ukraine) responded to the calls in 1990 and after 23 years with the help of anthropologist Serhiy Seheda the remains of Ivan Sirko were returned to his native land.

== Influences ==
Sirko's military career is legendary. According to Dmytro Yavornytsky, Sirko took part in 55 Cossack campaigns and never lost a battle. With new information available, Sirko's record could be increased to over 65 victories in battles. New sources reveal a larger number of campaigns in which Sirko was involved during his career, but so far, Sirko wasn't proven to have definitely lost any battle. Sirko's exploits gained the attention of Europe, with chroniclers such as Wespazjan Kochowski writing about him.

Sirko became infamous among Turks and Tatars, installing fear. They reportedly named Sirko the "Rus' Devil" (Urus Shaitan), signifying his reputation as an invincible Cossack leader. Polish chronicler Wespazjan Kochowski characterised Sirko the following way:

He was terrible in the Horde, for he was experienced in military campaigns and a brave cavalier, surpassing Doroshenko in this. And in the Crimea, his name inspired such fear that the Horde was on guard every day and was ready for battle, as if Sirko had already attacked. The Tatars quite seriously considered him a shaitan and even their children, when they cried and could not calm down, frightened Sirko, saying: 'Sirko is coming', after these words the crying immediately died down. Sirko was a handsome man, of a fighting character, he was not afraid of slush, frost, or heat. He was sensitive, cautious, patiently endured hunger, was decisive in military dangers and always sober. In the summer he was at the rapids (Dnieper), and in the winter - on the Ukrainian border. He did not like to waste time or court women, and was constantly fighting with the Tatars, against whom he had a natural and implacable hatred.

Author of History of Ruthenians gave the following impression of Sirko:

Sirko was an amazing man of rare qualities in the discussion of courage, enterprise and all military successes, and, with a sufficient number of troops, he could easily become Tamerlane or Genghis Khan, that is, a great conqueror.

=== Ukrainian assessment ===
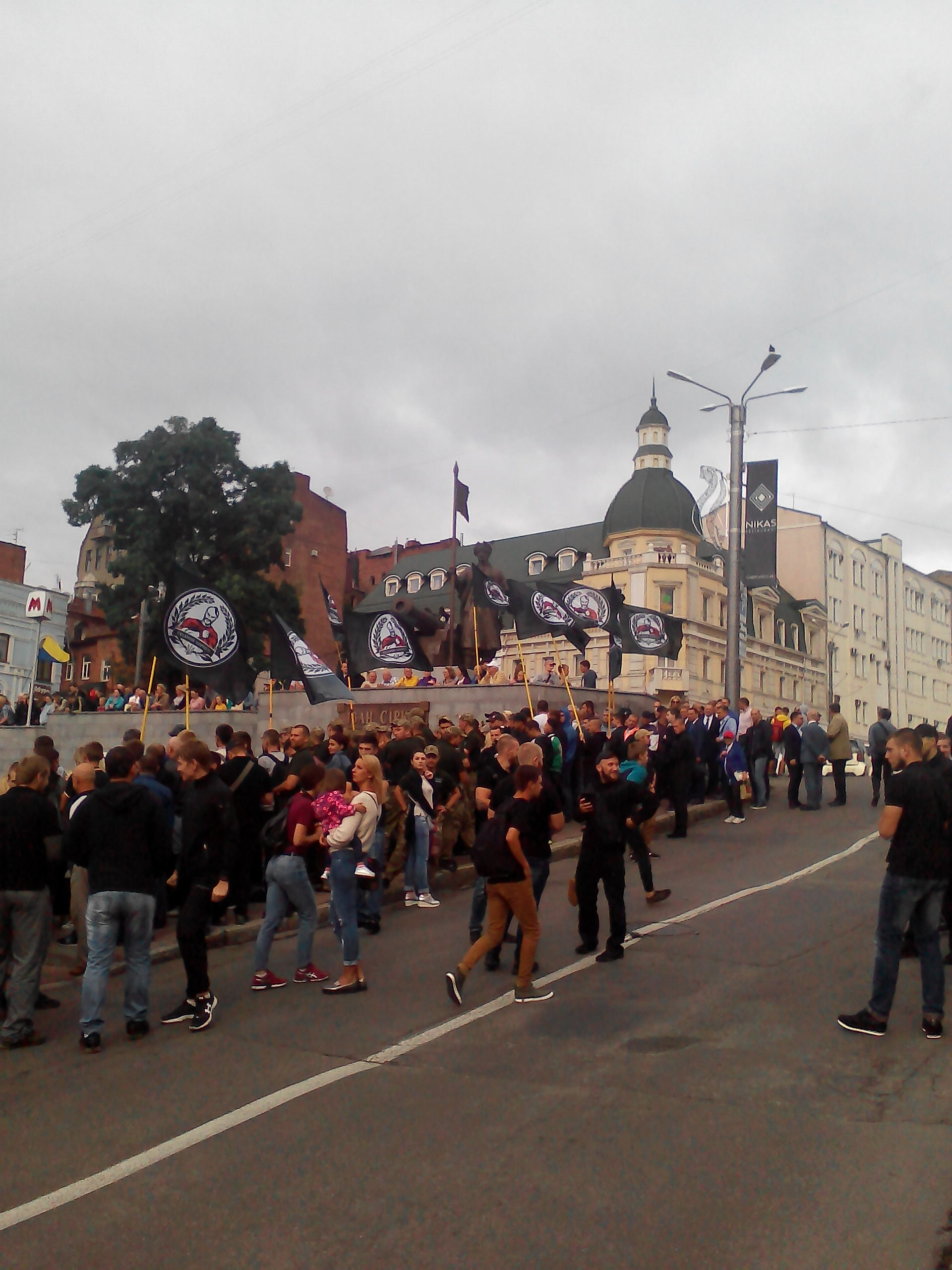
Solemn opening of the monument to Ivan Sirko. August 23, 2017. Kharkiv, Ukraine.

Monuments were built to Ivan Sirko in Kharkiv, Merefa, Pokrov, and Torhovytsia. His image is displayed on Ukrainian currency and his name is tied with Pokrovske city. Sirko's reputation as undefeated, invincible Cossack leader made him a subject of Ukrainian folk legends. He's one of the most famous Kharakternyks of Ukrainian mythology. Cossacks and Tatars believed that Ivan Sirko knew in advance against who and where he was going to battle, allowing him to win. They also believed that during the battle he turned into a wolf or hawk, conjuring the enemy army. According to a legend, Sirko’s right hand was cut off at his posthumous request, saying that it will bring Cossacks luck in battle wherever they brought it with them.

Sirko is widely remembered in numerous literary works of Ivan Nechuy-Levytsky, Adrian Kashchenko, Volodymyr Malyk, Mykola Zerov, Borys Modzalevsky, and many others. He is the main hero of Malyk's Ambassador of Urus-Shaitan. Adrian Kashchenko wrote about Sirko:

Could an ordinary man, with a handful of comrades, be able to fight off a much larger, better-armed Turkish and Tatar armies on his own, without anyone else's help, and slaughter over 30,000 Janissaries, like sheep, between the Sich Kurins? And who, if not Kharakternyk, could jump with a handful of men into Crimea, the nest of the great horde, destroy its cities, save the [Christian] slaves who were driven off their [native] land, and take a great amount of loot?.

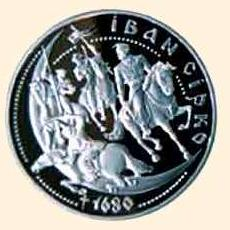
Ivan Sirko depicted on Ukrainian hryvnia.

Sirko’s legacy was also met with controversy and criticism among some Ukrainian historians. Dmytro Doroshenko blamed Sirko for having "unprincipled politics", "demagogic tendencies" and even "absence of rational reasoning" in his actions. That is, blocking actions of Cossack Hetmans to form a Cossack state independent from Tsardom of Russia and Polish-Lithuanian Commonwealth. History of Ruthenians gives an extreme assessment of Sirko: "Sirko was a remarkable man and of rare qualities as far as courage, discrimination, and military successes were concerned . . . and yet he was also a Zaporozhian, and therefore a species of clown or madman". However, Ivan Sirko remained an advocate of autonomous Cossack Ukraine, despite changing his political views many times. After a popular book, Iak kozaky voiuvaly ("How the Cossacks Fought") was published in 1990, Ivan Sirko began to be viewed in a more positive and idealistic image. According to this book: "the famed Cossack leader was a deeply religious man, an altruistic ascetic who almost never consumed alcohol and was known for his strength, valour, and high moral standards".

During the Ukrainian War of Independence in 1917–1921, the 4th Cavalry Regiment of the Ukrainian People's Army was named after Ivan Sirko.

In 1979, Soviet dissident Valentyn Moroz made his first public appearance in New York, in a rally for defense of Soviet political prisoners and Ukrainian national rights. During the rally, he told his Ukrainian audience the tale of Otaman Sirko, who executed 3,000 freed captives who wanted to go back to Crimea after Sirko's Crimean campaign. Moroz believed the execution was justified, saying: "A true Ukrainian would not remain in the Crimea if given the chance to return to Ukraine."

In August 2019, the 92nd Separate Mechanized Brigade of the Armed Forces of Ukraine was renamed after Ivan Sirko by a decree of President Volodymyr Zelenskyy.

=== Russian and Soviet assessment ===
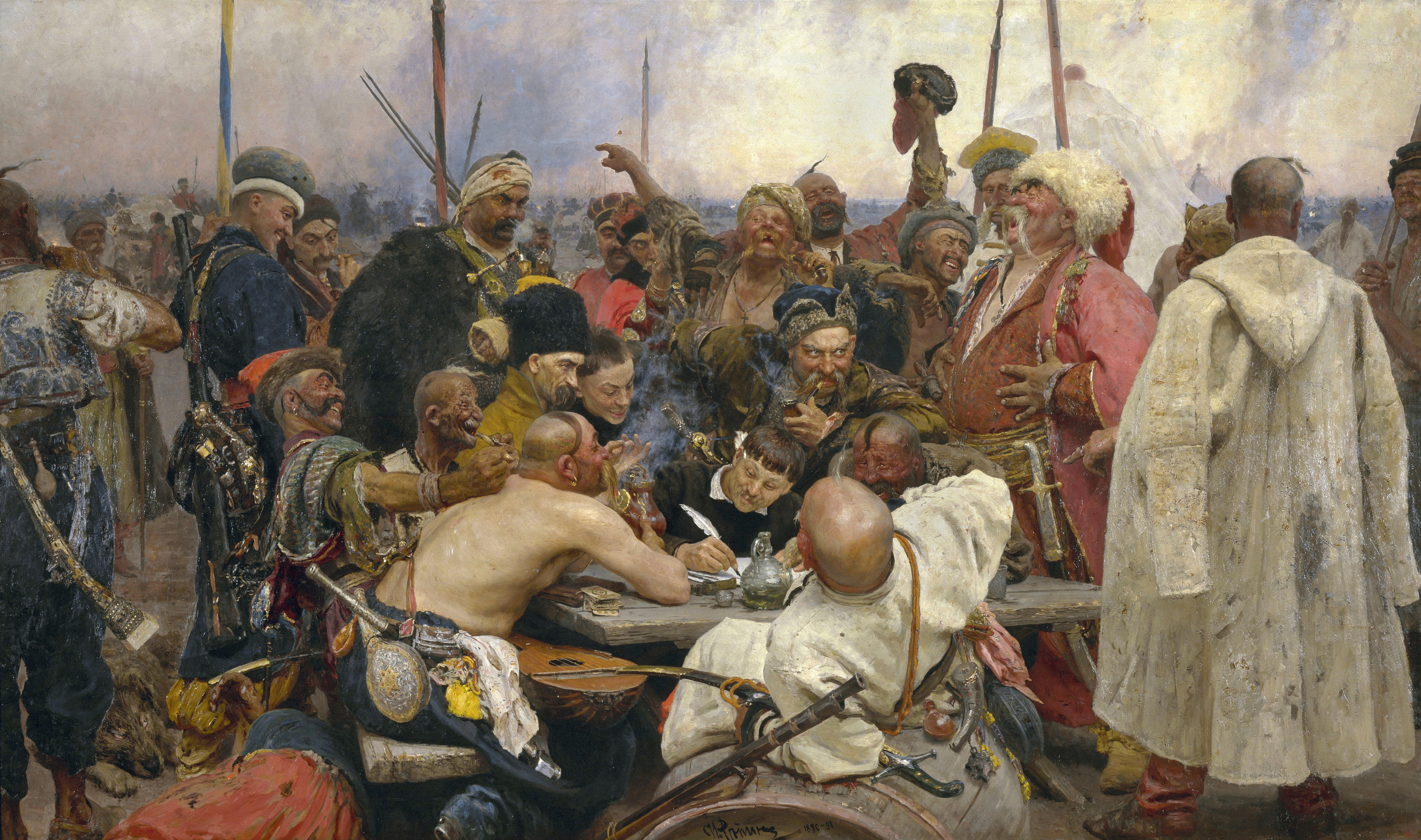
Reply of the Zaporozhian Cossacks by Ilya Repin.

Sirko is credited as the co-author of the mocking reply to Ottoman Sultan, which created a basis for the painting that was important in shaping both Ukrainian and Russian nationalism.

Sirko's reply to Ottoman Sultan became extremely popular at the beginning of the Russo-Turkish War (1877–1878). Ilya Repin made one his most famous pieces of artwork, Reply of the Zaporozhian Cossacks, inspired by the reply.

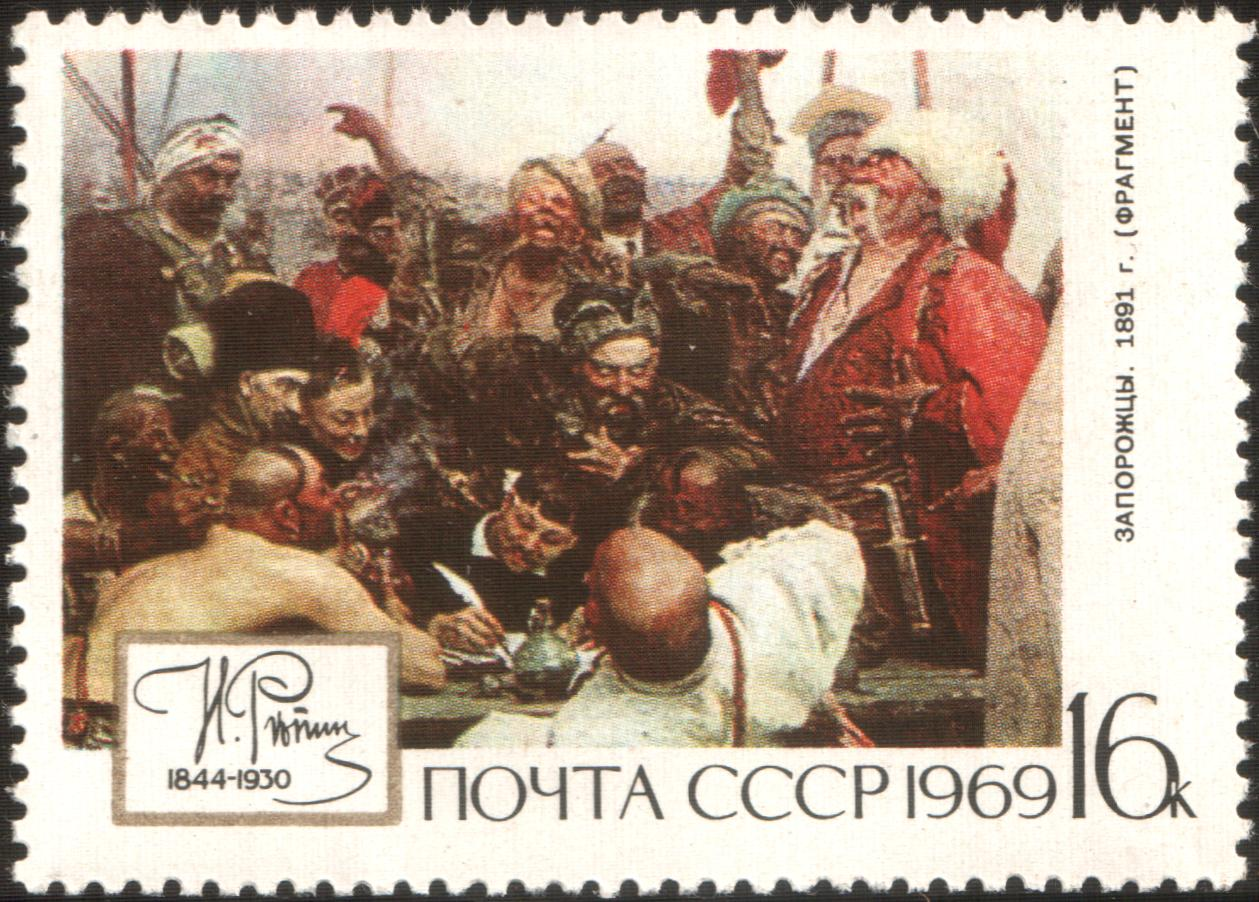
Soviet Post Stamp in 1969.

In 1952, KPU's Central Committee's inspector V. Stetsenko informed First Secretary Melnikov that the construction of hydroelectric dam in Nikopol will get Sirko's grave underwater. Stetsenko claimed that Sirko supported Khmelnytsky's policy on "reunion with Great Russian people". Stetsenko also mentioned Sirko's mocking reply to Ottoman Sultan which created a basis for the most popular painting in Ukrainian-Russian history, Ilya Repin's Reply of the Zaporozhian Cossacks. As a result, Soviet authorities moved Sirko's grave to another location in Nikopol. In 1955, they built a small monument to Sirko.

=== Other assessments ===
In 1966, when the President of France, Charles de Gaulle was visiting the Soviet Union, he personally requested to bring him to the burial location of Ivan Sirko. De Gaulle laid flowers to Sirko's monument in Kyiv and reportedly called him the "National Hero of France". On June 17, 2017, a commemorative plaque dedicated to Cossacks led by Ivan Sirko during the capture of Dunkirk was unveiled in presence of the Mayor of Dunkirk, Patrice Vergriete.

In 2011, David Bolgiano and James Patterson used Ivan Sirko’s reply to Ottoman Sultan in their book as an example of how Zaporozhian Cossacks dealt with "Islamists of the Ottoman Empire" in their clashes and underlined the strong use of language in the letter. This was used as an example to criticise the appeasement and soft approach of U.S. policy in Muslim countries.

== Bibliography ==
- Mytsyik, Yuriy. Otaman Ivan Sirko. Zaporizka Spadschyna (Zaporizhian Heritage), Ed.11. Zaporizhia: RA "Tandem-U", 1999.
- Evarnitsky, D. Ivan Dmitrievich Sirko, glavnyi koshevoi ataman zaporozhskikh nizovykh kazakov (Ivan Sirko, The Chief Kosh Otaman of Zaporizhian Cossacks). Saint-Petersburg, 1894.
- Палій, Олександр (2017). Історія України (in Ukrainian). Vol. 3. Kyiv: К.І.С. ISBN 978-617-684-166-1.
