= Volodymyr Malyk =

Soviet-Ukrainian writer (1921–1998)

- Володимир Кирилович Малик
- Born: 21 February 1921; Kiev Oblast, Ukrainian SSR
- Died: 31 August 1998 (aged 77)
- Occupations: writer, poet, literary critic, teacher
- Writing career
- Genres: historical novels, legends, poetry
- Notable works: Taiemnyi posol ("Privy Ambassador"), Horyt' svicha (Candle Burning)
- Notable awards: Literary Prize named after Lesya Ukrainka

Volodymyr Malyk (Ukrainian: Володимир Малик; born Volodymyr Sychenko; 21 February 1921 – 31 August 1998) was a Soviet-Ukrainian writer. Also known as a literary critic, he wrote reviews of the works of Ukrainian prose writers; published the book "Oles Donchenko" (1971) about the life and work of the famous children's writer Oles Donchenko.

== Personal life ==
Malyk was born into a peasant family. In 1938 he entered the philological faculty of Kiev University, at the same time he began composing poetry. With the outbreak of war, he had to interrupt his education. He enlisted in militia, worked in defense near Kiev and Kharkov, was wounded. From 1943 he was in German concentration camps; returning home only in October 1945. After the war, he worked as a teacher at Yasnogorodsky secondary school. In 1950 he graduated from Kyiv University in absentia. In 1953 he moved to Lubny.

== Publications ==
The first publication in 1957 was a poetic historical fairy tale-legend "Cranes, little cranes". This was followed by

=== Historical poems (legends) ===
- "Magic Ring"
- "Avenger from the Forest"
- "Red Rose"
- "Nikita Kozhumyaka"
- "Voivode Dmitry"

=== Tales ===
- "Black Equator"
- "Rookie"
- "Two wins"
- "The trail leads to the sea"
- "Two Above the Abyss"

=== Historical novels ===
- "Ambassador of Urus-Shaitan" (1968)
- "Sultan's Firman" (1969)
- "Black Rider" (1976)
- "Silk Lace" (1977)
- "Prince Kiy" (1982)
- "Black Shields" (1985)
- "Candle Burning" (Horyt' svicha) (1992), The novel tells about the Mongol invasion into the territory of Eastern Ukraine and the siege of Kyiv. The primary role in the novel is given to ordinary people living in communities. The author thanks the termination of the Mongol invasion precisely to that people and instead blames the elites for lack of coordination and wisdom.
- "Chumack way" (1993)
- "Red Poppies" (2001)
- "Blue Book" (Diary) (2010)
- "Memories. Letters to a brother and friend" (2020)

=== Taiemnyi posol ("Privy Ambassador") tetralogy ===
Taiemnyi posol ("Privy Ambassador") are the most prominent series of Malyk's historical novels. The tetralogy tells about the adventures of fictional Zaporozhian Cossack Arsen Zvenyhora and his lover Zlatka, portraying some notable figures like Ivan Sirko and events of 17th century Ukraine, Russia, Ottoman Empire and other countries, like the Battle of Vienna. Heavily influenced by Marxism and the official Soviet view of Muscovy-Ukraine relations, those novels may still pose an exciting popular reading on the topic. The main character Arsen Zvenyhora is a sort of "17th century James Bond": an action hero and polyglot, easily adapting to rapidly changing circumstances and ethno-cultural environments. The character is exaggeratedly positive: almighty leader and generous friend, a loyal lover and vassal. Thus, Zvenyhora looks like an archetypal knight of the first historical novels. The plot of the novel reject the idea of a ‘good tsar’. The main character, who is an ordinary Cossack from Zaporozhian Sich, eclipses the figures of the representatives of the upper class, who appear greedy and dishonest.

== Awards ==
Malyk received Literary Prize named after Lesya Ukrainka (1983) - for works on a historical and patriotic theme for children (including the novels "Ambassador of Urus-Shaitan", "Silk Lace" and "Prince Kiy").

== See also ==
- History of the Cossacks

== Notes ==
- Минуле з висоти сучасності by Г.Я.Сергієнко, a review to: Малик В. Твори в 2-х томах. К.: Дніпро, 1986. - С.3-14 (The author cites Karl Marx, Friedrich Engels and Vissarion Belinsky to prove Malyk's loyalty and usefulness for Soviet ideology.)
