= Sich-Tsardom crisis =

17th Century Political Crisis

Sich-Tsardom Crisis
- Part of The Ruin
- Date: December 1673 – June 1674
- Caused by: Lack of funding from Russian Tsardom; Sirko's conflict with Hetman Samoylovych
- Goals: Preserving independence of Zaporozhian Sich; Sirko's revenge for exile to Siberia (possibly)
- Result: Sich victory (See § Aftermath)

Parties
Zaporozhian Sich	Tsardom of Russia; Cossack Hetmanate

Lead figures
Ivan Sirko; Grigory Pelek; Andrey Yakovlev; Stepan Bely; Fyodor Sriblyanyk; Ignat Goloblya (POW); Hrytsk Golob (POW); Yarem Kvasha (POW); False Semyon (surrendered)	(Tsardom of Russia) Tsar Alexis (Tsardom of Russia) Grigory Romodanovsky (Tsardom of Russia) Lukyan Andreyev † (Tsardom of Russia) Semyon Shchogolev (POW) (Tsardom of Russia) Vasily Chaduyev (POW); Ivan Samoylovych; Osavul Chernyachenko (POW)

Casualties and losses
Several envoys captured (later released)	1 killed 2 envoys captured (later released)

The Sich-Tsardom crisis occurred between the Sich Cossacks of Ivan Sirko and Tsardom of Russia supported by Cossack Hetmanate, which occurred over Sich sheltering False Tsarevich Semyon, from December 1673 to June 1674.

== Prelude ==
Zaporozhian Sich was going through plague, while Ivan Sirko was away for fishing. However, an unexpected event occurred, which was the arrival of "Tsarevich Semyon" who claimed to be the son of Tsar Alexei Mikhailovich. He claimed to have secretly supported Stenka Razin in his uprising. Semyon managed to convince that he was "Prince" to Cossacks, and Sirko after his arrival gave him shelter in the Sich. Tsarist authorities found out about the impostor's presence in the Sich and begun attempts to extradite him, sending envoys for this purpose on December 14, 1673.

== Crisis ==
On December 21, Tsarist envoys arrived to Baturyn to meet Hetman Samoylovych. The hetman initially advised them not to go to the Sich and promised that his messengers would deal with the issue. However, Samoilovych then discovered that his messengers had been detained for unexplained reasons. Tsarist envoys, Semyon Shchogolev and Vasily Chaduyev proceeded to the Sich, despite warnings from the hetman and Cossacks they met on the way. Sirko's envoys met them and explained the negative and threatening mood of the Sich Cossacks, including Sirko, towards Moscow. As a result, Ignat Goloblya and other Sich envoys were detained. The hetman agreed to send 40 Cossacks commanded by Osavul Chernyachenko for the protection of Tsarist envoys heading to Sich.

On March 1, 1674 the delegation met with Sich Cossack representatives. The envoys had previously learnt that the Sich community was not willing to hand over the impostor, but still headed to the Sich. They were accompanied by Lukyan Andreyev who got them across the river. Andreyev himself got in conflict with Sich Cossacks returning to their stronghold, insulting them, which resulted in his death.

On March 9, envoys arrived to the Sich. Sich Cossacks were convinced that Semyon was a real prince. Sirko was asleep during the meeting. The envoys scolded the false Prince, and Semyon attacked him with sabre and was nearly killed by one of them in response. Eventually, the Muscovites were cornered by the Sich Cossacks, but managed to de-escalate the situation until Sirko would wake up.

On March 12–13, Sirko expressed his anti-Moscow sentiments and was still convinced of Semyon's royal origin. He complained about the lack of payments and supplies sent from Moscow, despite being promised more. Sirko didn't exclude the possibility of switching allegiance to another state.

On March 18–19, Sirko and Sich Cossacks were still convinced of Semyon's royal origin, but signs of falsehood begun to appear, which Cossacks noticed in the letter, related to Semyon's age. Sirko allowed Tsarist envoys to return to Moscow with Sich envoys, along with releasing Hetman's messengers.

On April 4, Tsarist envoys arrived to see the hetman Samoilovych. During the same time 34 Sich Cossacks appeared, who said they wanted to go to Moscow. The hetman, along with boyars, wanted to take Sirko's family hostage and blockade the Sich, but he couldn't do so without the Tsar's permission. Sirko meanwhile was waiting for the arrival of Kalmyks to "go on a campaign to Astrakhan and Siberia". He wasn't concerned about a potential blockade of Sich, as he believed he would receive assistance from Tatars.

On April 7, Tsarist envoys arrived to Moscow. They claimed that Sirko was planning a revolt against the Tsar to install the False Prince into power. Sirko during that time was trying to reestablish his connections with Petro Doroshenko. When the hetman learnt about this, Sich envoys were detained.

On May 23-28, Sirko sent letters to the Hetman's brother and Grigory Romodanovsky. Sirko expressed his willingness to exchange prisoners and reassured the Tsarist authorities that he had no intention of allying with the Crimean Khanate. Sirko later wrote to the Tsar himself. The conflict was resolved in June.

== Aftermath ==
As a result of complaints issued by Sirko and his Cossacks in respect to the lack of payments given to them, Tsar Alexis increased payments to the Zaporozhian Sich in order to resolve the crisis. Sirko eventually agreed to hand over the False Prince Semyon and exchanged prisoners and was given payments from the Tsar for doing so. This way he successfully demonstrated the independent policy of Sich. Dmytro Yavornytsky noted on Sirko's actions in these events:

It is difficult to assume that Sirko, an experienced, far-sighted and insightful person, believed in the authenticity of the origin of the person who called himself the son of Tsar Alexei Mikhailovich, and in the sincerity of the impostor's tale about escaping from Moscow... Most likely, Sirko played the role of a person convinced of the truth of the royal origin of False Simeon - such a role was useful for him in order to keep Moscow in his hands and thereby preserve the political independence of Zaporozhye. Perhaps revenge for the exile to Siberia was added to this.

In 1677-1678 Sirko conducted diplomatic talks with Russia and the Hetmanate, which ended in success. He managed to secure necessary supplies for the Sich, helping to strengthen it.

== Bibliography ==
- Yavornytskyi, Dmytro (2004). Tvory (in Ukrainian). Vol. 1. Tandem-U. ISBN 966-7482-31-6.
- Коляда, І.А. (2012). Отаман Сірко (in Ukrainian). Folio. ISBN 978-966-03-5804-1.
- Смолій, Валерій (1998). Полководці Війська Запорозького (in Ukrainian). Vol. 1. КМ Academia. ISBN 966-518-011-8.
