= Correspondence between the Ottoman sultan and the Cossacks =

Forged exchange of letters

1912 Ukrainian version of the alleged correspondence in Mykola Arkas's History of Ukraine–Rus'

The Correspondence between the Ottoman sultan and the Cossacks, also variously known as the Correspondence between the Cossacks and the Ottoman/Turkish sultan, is a collection of apocryphal letters claiming to be between a sultan of the Ottoman Empire (usually identified as Mehmed IV) and a group of Cossacks, originally associated with the city of Chyhyryn, Ukraine, but later with Zaporizhzhia, Ukraine.

According to traditional interpretations, the sultan's letter and the Cossack response (also known as the Zaporozhian/Cossack letter to the Turkish sultan; Ukrainian: Лист запорожців турецькому султанові, romanized: Lyst zaporozhtsiv turets'komu sultanovi) were written between 1672 and 1680. The sultan supposedly demanded the Cossacks to surrender by boasting about his titles and power, and the Cossacks, allegedly commanded by a man named Ivan Sirko (or "Zakharcenko") sent an insulting sarcastic reply in which they vowed to fight against the sultan.

Although early commentators were in doubt whether the apocryphal letters were possibly authentic, modern scholars have known since the 1970s that the supposed "correspondence" is a literary forgery, that is to be understood within the turcica: a large body of similar writings of early modern European Christian anti-Ottoman propaganda which emerged during the Ottoman wars in Europe. It is not certain whether the original text was written in Middle Polish or (less likely) Middle Ukrainian, but the Russian ("Muscovite") versions are almost certainly translations of a non-Russian original. It is also possible that the Polish original was first translated into Russian, and later into Ukrainian.

== History ==
=== Examination ===
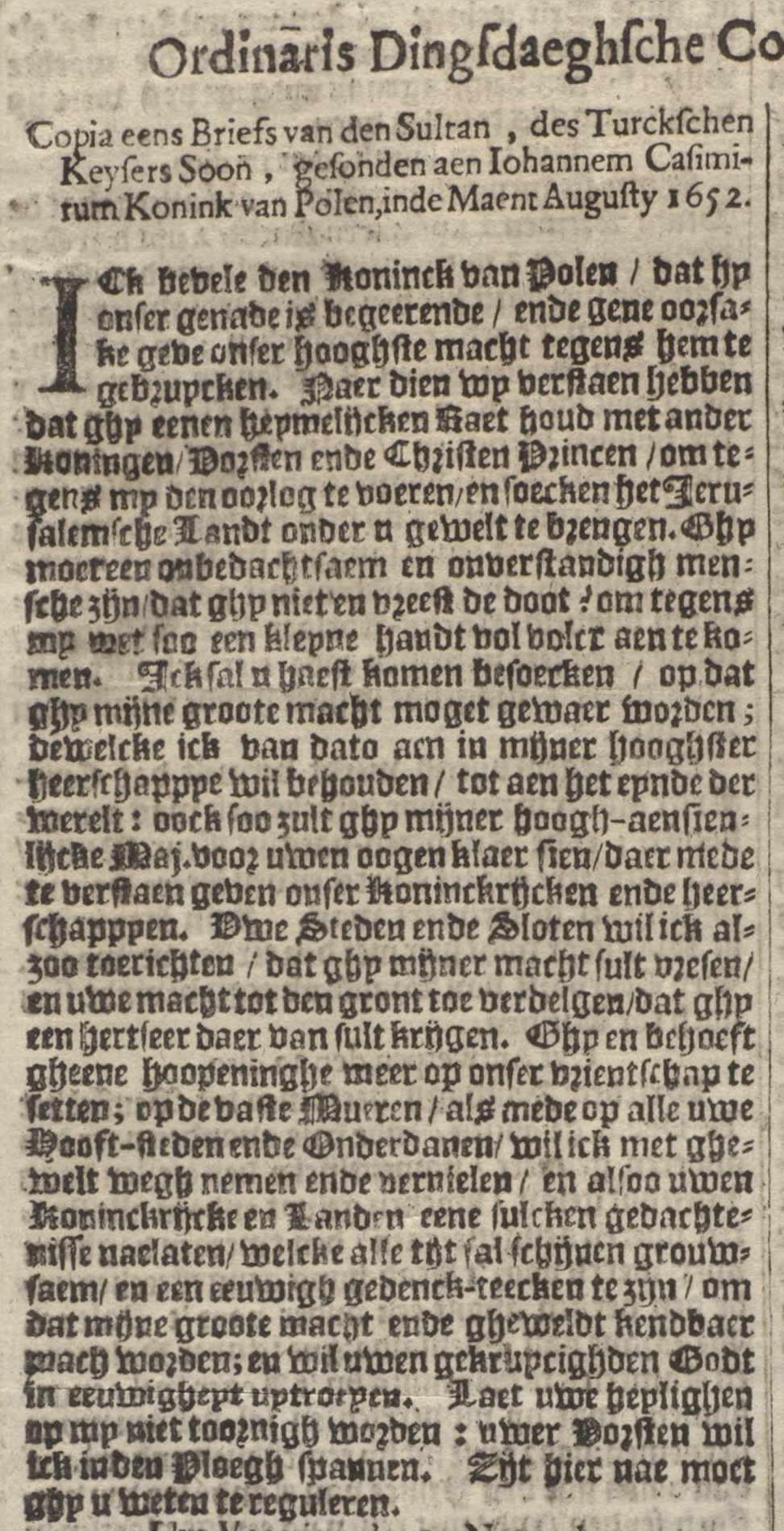
A similar fake letter, published in Dutch in 1652, supposedly sent by an unspecified 'Turkish' sultan to king John II Casimir Vasa of Poland. The sultan boasts of his military power, claims John has secretly met up with other Christian princes to form an anti-Ottoman coalition, and threatens to violently conquer his lands. Some early turcica such as this one are addressed to the Polish king, not the Cossacks; they do not mention Cossacks, and are not accompanied by a reply from the Cossacks. (Note: Waugh observed in 1971: "The "Reply" of the Cossacks derives directly from the sultan's letter to them. Most of the other seventeenth-century apocryphal letters of the sultan appear alone; none of the replies which do exist coincide with that of the Cossacks. In some cases the other replies attempt a phrase-by-phrase parody of the sultan's letter, but only in the "Correspondence" is this carried through consistently both in the intitulatio and dispositio.") The text is closely related to the Kurtzer Bericht 1653 in German.

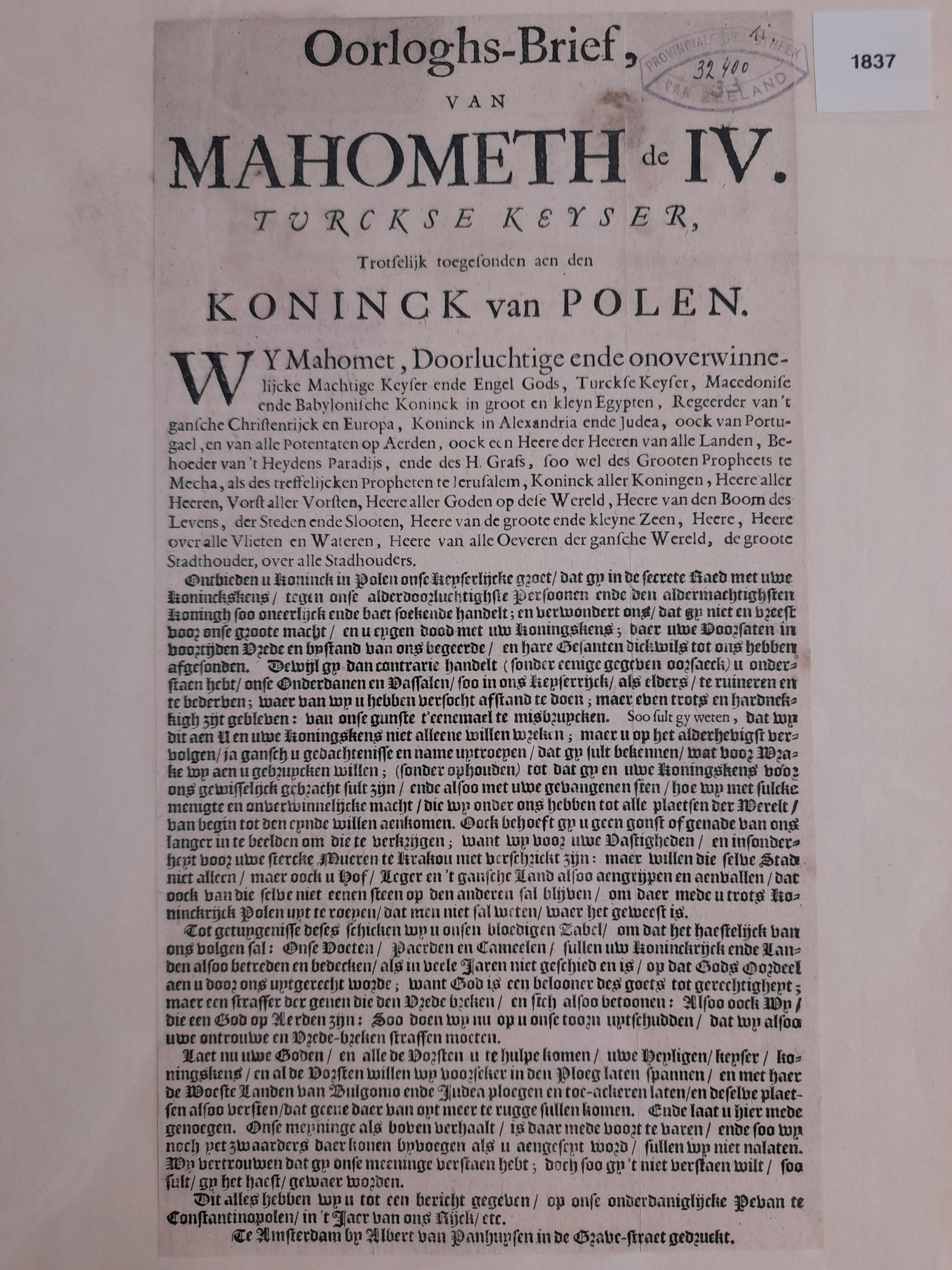
1672 Dutch version, preserved in the Zeeland Library, of the fake threatening letters of the Ottoman sultan (in this case allegedly Mehmed IV) to the King of Poland (in this case unnamed). Its contents are broadly similar to the 1652 Dutch version, but textually, they are much closer to the 1621 Dutch version, which was evidently translated from German.

One of the first people who attempted to critically study the correspondence between the sultan and Cossacks was Andrej Popov (1869). He correctly linked it to a group of other apocryphal letters attributed to the sultan that appear in 17th-century Muscovite manuscripts, but he incorrectly concluded that all of these letters had to have been written by the same Muscovite author in the last quarter of the 17th century. Subsequent studies attempted to show that the original text of the sultan–Cossack correspondence was written in Polish, and then translated into Ukrainian and Russian, or that Ukrainian was the primary version. Kostiantyn V. Kharlampovych / Xarlampovyč (1923) did the first thorough textological analysis of several versions available to him, which he divided into two groups: short Russian versions (known to Popov) which connected the Cossacks to Chyhyryn, and longer Ukrainian versions (collectively called the "Ukrainian redaction") which connected the Cossacks to Zaporizhzhia and contained various other elements not found in the short Russian versions. Although Kharlampovych did not have access to any Polish versions, the internal evidence convinced him that Polish had to have been the original language, and that factual discrepancies in the Ukrainian texts made it extremely implausible that they had originated from the 17th-century Cossacks in Ukraine.

With her two 1950s articles, Marianna Davidovna Kagan-Tarkovskaia was the first scholar to thoroughly examine many Russian texts, concluding they were most likely translated from Ukrainian to Russian by the Posolskii prikaz (Muscovite Ambassadorial/Diplomatic Chancery), which was in charge of translating foreign pamphlets and newspapers. Nud'ha (1963) brought a so-far unknown Polish text to light and argued for an early-17th-century Ukrainian origin of the correspondence, but his conclusions were found to be untenable. In 1966, Eustachiewicz and Inglot published a number of Polish versions of the sultan–Cossack letters, which – with one exception – corresponded to the "Ukrainian redaction", and cited a significant amount of evidence to connect it to a well-established 17th-century literary tradition in Poland.

In a 1620 letter, Sultan Osman II addressed the Zaporozhian Cossacks not as subjects but as a sovereign power, using the formal title "Kazaklar" and offering them vassal status directly under the Porte to entice them away from Poland.

=== Observations and conclusions ===
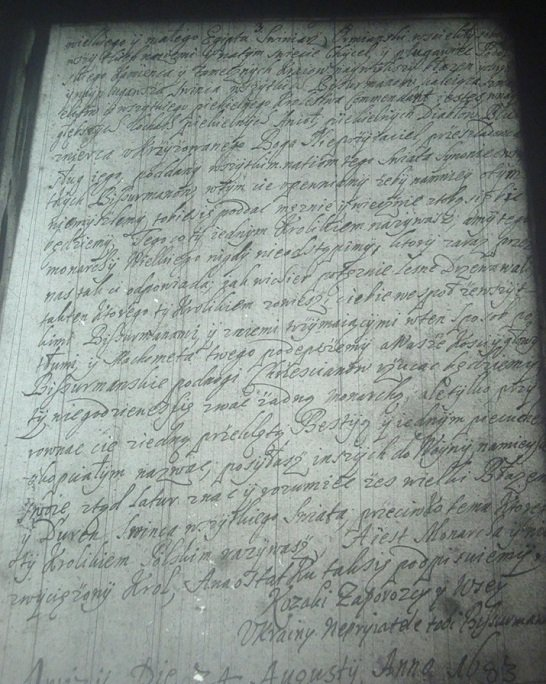
1683 Polish version of the Cossack letter to the sultan, found in 2019

U.S.-based Slavic and Eastern European historian Daniel C. Waugh (1978) observed:

The correspondence of the sultan with the Chyhyryn Cossacks had undergone a textual transformation sometime in the eighteenth century whereby the Chyhyryntsy became the Zaporozhians and the controlled satire of the reply was debased into vulgarity. In this vulgar version, the Cossack correspondence spread quite widely in the nineteenth century. In a number of instances, it was cited as authentic documentation, largely, it seems, because the letters tended to confirm a preconceived romantic picture of what the Cossacks were thought to be like: coarse and piratical, but heroes of the struggle in Ukraine for independence from non-Ukrainian controls. Obviously the revival of the Cossack correspondence in such a context is to be connected with the growth of Ukrainian nationalism as well as the growing scholarly interest in the study of national and ethnic distinctions. The best-known reflection of the nineteenth-century popularity of the Cossack correspondence is the famous painting by II'ia Repin showing the uproarious Zaporozhians penning their reply.

According to Ukrainian historian Volodymyr Pylypenko (2019), the letter is 'perhaps the most famous forgery in Ukrainian history, a fake with a long and vibrant history (...). The text has undergone numerous translations and rewritings.' A French and a German translation became the best-known versions, as these made the text accessible to a large European readership. Pylypenko pointed out that the letter bears many stylistic similarities to other fake documents and forgeries that appeared in the 17th century, including the Polish–Lithuanian Commonwealth and the Tsardom of Russia (Muscovy), which purported to be genuine correspondence between various Eastern European Christian monarchs and the Ottoman sultan, but were in fact works of political-religious propaganda. He summarised this genre as follows:

- The Sultan's letters to the King of Rzeczpospolita (the Polish–Lithuanian Commonwealth)
- fake correspondence between the monarchs;
- the Sultan's letters to the Polish gentry; and
- a set of false agreements related to the creation of a European Christian anti-Turkish coalition.'

Russian historian Ivan Poliakov (2018) published the oldest known copy of the sultan–Cossack correspondence as found in a Romodanovsky archive from the 1670s, which is very important for understanding how these texts came into existence. According to Russian historian Stepan Mikhailovich Shamin (2020), the evidence indicates that the text began as a simple joke in the form of a pamphlet by Polish nobles, in which the Chyhyryn Cossacks rebuffed the sultan's titles and threats with humour; Grigory Romodanovsky found this text interesting and funny, had it translated into Russian and then gave it to his nephew S. V. Romodanovsky. Shamin stated that the originally Polish text thus probably found its way through the Romodanovsky family into the Russian language and into the Russian/Muscovite realm. By the late 17th and early 18th century, the pamphlet reappeared in a somewhat modified version every time a new war broke out with the Ottomans, and from the 18th century (especially the mid-18th century) onwards, there are also many Ukrainian versions of the sultan–Cossack correspondence showing up. The fact that the city of Chyhyryn (capital of the Cossack Hetmanate 1648–1676) was destroyed in the 1670s war, and its defence against Ottoman expansion faded from memory with the passage of time, is probably the reason why the "Chyhyryn Cossacks" were eventually replaced by the "Zaphorozhian Cossacks" (much better-known in later times) in most 18th-century versions of the text.

Ukrainian historian Taras Chuhlib (2020) outlined two main reasons for considering all known versions of the sultan–correspondence as literary inventions rather than authentic historical documents:

- The original text has not been found, but the numerous versions that have survived all contradict each other:
  - The letters are dated to different years, including 1600, 1619, 1620, 1667, 1672, 1677, 1683, et cetera.
  - The signature below the Cossack letter differs widely, including "grassroots Cossacks", "Otaman Zakharchenko", and "Ivan Sirko".
  - The recipients of the Cossack letter differ widely in identifying which Ottoman sultan they are replying to, including "Osman", "Mehmed IV", "Ahmed III", and so on.
  - The Ottoman sultan addresses the Cossacks in numerous different ways, including identifying them with either Chyhyryn or Zaporizhzhia.
- The style of the Cossack letter is not credibly historic: 'In fact, it is known about the diplomatic correspondence of Cossack rulers with the rulers of other countries, including the Turkish sultan,' that it had 'a completely different character and never violated the etiquette of the time to address a person of this level.'

== Versions ==
=== Romodanovsky 1670s (published Poliakov 2018) ===
In 2018, Ivan Anatol'evich Poliakov published a detailed examination of what might be the oldest extant copy of a correspondence between the Chyhyryn Cossacks and the Ottoman sultan. The copy was found amongst a collection of writings in the archives of the Rurikid prince S. V. Romodanovsky. Poliakov noted that he was not the first to discover this copy, as Marianna D. Kagan had already referred to it in 1992, but she did not analyse it at the time. Although the latest date in the collection is 25 August 1678, Poliakov found the most probable date of composition for the sultan–Cossack letters in it to be 1673 due to the historical context of the Polish–Ottoman War (1672–1676). Nevertheless, as many other scholars had pointed out earlier, the text bore countless similarities to earlier such anti-Turkish pamphlets published in Polish, German, Dutch and other European languages more than a century earlier, traceable as far back as 1518. These pamphlets were frequently published when a new war between a European Christian state and the Ottoman Empire had broken out; some details were changed, updated or added to apply to the new situation, and then the pamphlet was spread over Europe and translated into other languages. As for the sultan–Cossack correspondence, the evidence supported a Polish original, which Poliakov suggested may have been inspired by – and written shortly after – the Cossack conquest of the Ottoman Azov Fortress in 1637.

Translation from a Polish letter from the leaf of the Sultan of Turkey was written in Chyhyryn by a Cossack in the year of 13 July.

AHOY. Sultan, the prince, the sultan of Turkey, prince of Turkey, of Greece, Macedonia, Babylon, Jerusalem, pasha of Assyria, and of greater and lesser Egypt, king of Alexandria, Armenia and of all the inhabitants of the world, King of Kings, servant of God: I command you, as a valiant soldier, defender of the peasantry, guardian of God, great ruler, grandfather of the land, hope and consolation of the busurman [Islamic] peoples, and sorrow and doom for Christians, that you and all men voluntarily surrender.

The same year and the same month from Chyhyryn from the Cossacks to the Sultan.

Sultan, son of the cursed Sultan of Turkey, companion of Satan, hellish abysmal Sultan of Turkey, Greek pedestal, cook of Babylon, armourer of Jerusalem, wheelwright of Assyria, winegrower of greater and lesser Egypt, Alexandrian pig farmer, Armenian saddle-piece, Tatar dog, accursed viper living in the world, thief of Kamenets-Podolsky and all the world, subject of the spider and the scarecrow, bogeyman of the whole world, Turkish district busurman [Muslim], I am equal to the body, slanderer of Satan, whole host of hell, cursed messenger of Satan, enemy of the God and persecutor of his servants, hope and comfort of the busurmen [Muslims], and their downfall and sorrow. We will not yield to you, but we will fight you.

=== Vienna 1683 (German and Polish) ===
In 2019, Ukrainian historian Taras Chuhlib found a Polish version of the sultan–Cossack correspondence in the library of the Polish Academy of Arts and Sciences in Kraków, dated to 24 August 1683. In a 2020 paper, Chuhlib compared this Polish version to two already-known German versions also dated to 1683 (one published by Waugh 1971, both published by Hryhoriy Nudha 1990), all three of which seem to have been written in September–December 1683 in the aftermath of the Battle of Vienna, in order to glorify John III Sobieski, under whose overall command the Christian coalition had defeated the Ottomans at Vienna. The German versions were both titled Copia des Türkischen Kaysers Brief an die Cosacken nach Czechrin ("Copy of the Turkish Emperor's Letter to the Cossacks to Chyhyryn"), with one adding und darauf der Cosacken Antwort ("and the Cossack Answer to it"), while the Polish version was signed with Kozaki Zaporozcy y całey [?] Ukrainy ("Cossacks of Zaporozhya and all of Ukraine"). Waugh (1971) noted that one of the 1683 German versions was derived from a Slavic original, given loanwords such as Bojar, Sobaka ("dog") and Kolbake ("sausage"), and the typo Engel ("angel") rather than Engle ("grandson"), which corresponds to vnuk in Slavic versions. Chuhlib suggested that Jerzy Franciszek Kulczycki may have been involved with the pamphlets' translation to German.

The 1683 German version(s) feature a significantly longer ending to the Cossack reply, (italicized below) wherein it is argued that John III Sobieski (without naming him explicitly) is not a paholk / Kerl ("boy"), but a far mightier king than the Turkish sultan – a section evidently inserted by a pro-Polish editor:

Copy of the Turkish Caesar's letter to the Cossacks to Chyhyryn. Printed in 1683.

"The most fine Sultan, Turkish Caesar's son, boyar of the Turkish, Macedonians, Babylonians, Jerusalem, king in Alexandria, greater and lesser Egypt, king of the poor and all the princes of the world, grand prince, an angel of God, brave hero of Christianity, instigator, guardian of the crucified God's great heritage of the earth, hope and joy of the bishop men, downfaller of Christians, etc. We command you, so that you as all one team, willingly humble yourselves to us and surrender, and go to war against our enemies. Do not obey the Polish boy, as the masses have in hard times, you will not do that, else then you shall all be killed, as will your wives and children, as well as the Polish boy, with his whole country, who I want to defeat and make my subjects."

The reply from the Cossacks:

"The cursed Sultan, Turkish Caesar's son, and attendant of the infernal Lucifer in the abyss of hell, Turkish emperor, footstool of the Greeks, cook of Macedonians, locksmith of Babylonians, wheelwright of Jerusalem, drunkard of Assyria, swineherd of greater and lesser Egypt, sausage of Alexandria, and dog of Armenians, the cursed childish knave upon earth and the world, the great fool of Kamenets-Podolsky and the country, and a nasty pig in the world, the Turkish biter of men, the commander of the whole hellish empire in the deep abyss of hell, an angel of the infernal devil, a mocker of the crucified God, enemy and persecutor of his servants, below all those who live above, the downfaller of the bishop men: We report to you that we have no thoughts of surrendering to you, but are bravely, manfully, and eternally resolved to fight you and whomever you call a fellow, together with a great monarch whom, according to your legends, as a fellow fells the wood in the forest, so he will fall down upon you, and your busurmans, and all your followers, and especially you, who can be compared not to a fellow, but rather to a cursed old woman, if one may even call you so, you sit in a hole like a devil's child, or a hen-thief, who changes his nest in the war to another, one which shows that you are a fool, instead of the one you call a boy, who is a brave, powerful monarch and invincible king." (Note: The 1683 German version published by Waugh 1971 renders this passage as follows: "Türkischen Kaysers Sohn... du sizest im Loch wie ein Teuffels-Kind / oder Hüner-Dieb / seinem nest einen anderen zum Krieg an deine Stelle / dar auß leicht zu ersehen / daß du ein Narr bist / dagegen der / den du vor einen Kerl nennest / ist ein tapffer großmächtiger Monarch / und ein unüberwindlicher König.")

=== Chronograph of 1696 (published Popov 1869) ===
The text published by Andrej Popov in his book Изборник славянских и русских сочинений и статей ("Collection of Slavic and Russian Works and Articles", 1869, p. 455–456) is in Russian. Popov found this copy in the Chronograph of 1696. In this version, which is shorter than many Ukrainian ones, the Cossacks are connected to the city of Chyhyryn (Ukrainian: Чигири́н; Russian: Чигирин Chigirin):

A list of the letters sent to the Cossacks of Chyhyryn from the Turkish Sultan on 7 July 1678:

"From the Turkish Sultan, son of a Sultan, Caesar of the Turks, Greeks, Macedonians, Babylonians, and Jerusalem, pasha of Assyria, greater and lesser Egypt, King of Alexandria, the Armenians, and all the inhabitants of the world, prince over princes, grandson of God, brave warrior, prophet of the Christian God, keeper of the crucified God's Kingdom, great-grandfather on earth, hope and consolation of busurman, and sorrow and faller of Christians, we command you that all (you) people voluntarily and naturally surrender."

The answer of the Cossacks of Chyhyryn to the Sultan:

"To the Turkish Sultan, son of an accursed Sultan, comrade of Satan in the abyss of hell, Sultan of the Turks, footstool of the Greeks, the cook of Babylon, the armourer of Jerusalem, the wheeler of Assyria, the brewer of greater and lesser Egypt, the swineherd of Alexandria, the saddler of Armenians, the beast of Kamenets, and all the accursed asps of the world, whose subjects are mockers and misers, ghost on the earth, turmoil of the Turkish busurman, slanderer to Satan and his whole host, the grandson of hell, the accursed messenger of Satan, the enemy of the crucified God and the persecutor of his servants, the hope and consolation of the busurman, their sorrow and faller, we will not surrender to you, rather, we will fight with you."

=== Kostomarov 1872 ===
In 1978, American Slavic linguist Victor Friedman gave a detailed analysis of the historical and linguistic background of two versions available to him: the Yavornytsky (Evarnickij) 1894 version in Middle Ukrainian with standardised Russian orthography and containing only one taboo word, and the 1872 Kostomarov version in Middle Ukrainian with a Ukrainian type orthography and containing four 'scatological' taboo words. Because the latter was more archaic in style, Friedman concluded it was probably closer to the original, and thus took the 1872 Kostomarov version as the basis for his English translation and further analysis.

Sultan Mehmed IV to the Zaporozhian Cossacks:
I, the Sultan, son of Mohamed, brother of the Sun and Moon, grandson and vicegerent of God, sovereign of all kingdoms: of Macedonia, Babylonia, and Jerusalem, of Upper and Lower Egypt: king of kings, ruler of all that exists; extraordinary, invincible knight; constant guardian of the grave of Jesus Christ; trustee of God himself; hope and comfort of Moslems, confusion and great protector of Christians, command you, the Zaporozhian Cossacks, to surrender to me voluntarily and without any kind of resistance, and don't permit yourselves to trouble me with your attacks!

— Turkish Sultan Mohamed

Zaporozhians – to the Turkish Sultan:
You Turkish Satan, brother and comrade of the damned devil and secretary to Lucifer himself! What the hell kind of knight are you? The devil s[hit]s and you and your army swallow [it]. You aren't fit to have the sons of Christians under you; we aren't afraid of your army, and we'll fight you on land and sea.

You Babylonian busboy, Macedonian mechanic, Jerusalem beerbrewer, Alexandrian goatskinner, swineherd of Upper and Lower Egypt, Armenian pig, Tatar goat, Kamenets hangman, Podolian thief, grandson of the Evil Serpent himself, and buffoon of all the world and the netherworld, fool of our God, swine's snout, mare's a[ssho]le, butcher's dog, unbaptized brow, may the devil steam your a[s]s!

That's how the cossacks answer you, you nasty glob of spit! You're unfit to rule true Christians. We don't know the date because we don't have a calendar, the moon [=month] is in the sky, and the year is in a book, and the day is the same with us as with you, so go kiss our b[ut]t!

— Chief Hetman Zaxarcenko with all the Zaporozhian Host

=== Dunavec 1882 (published Krauss 1880s) ===
Friedman (1978) found another version of the two letters in volume 5 of Krypta¡dia (edited and published by Friedrich Salomon Krauss in Heilbronn and Paris between 1883 and 1905), 'where it is said to have been collected in Nižnij Dunavec, Dobrudža, in 1882' (probably modern Dunavets / Дунавец in Tutrakan Municipality in Southern Dobruja, Bulgaria); French translations alongside both letters were also provided. Both the sultan's letter and the Cossack reply are significantly shorter than in the Yavornytsky and Kostomarov versions, and in 'a basically modern, normalized Ukrainian'. Friedman also noted that the phrase mat' tvoju job ("fuck your mother") is an 'insult taken directly from the Russian' (in Ukrainian, it would have been matir tvoju jib), represents 'swearing in the "Muscovite" manner' and 'is the only Russianism in the text'; the phrase is therefore unlikely to be part of the original text, but rather an interpolation. Friedman only translated the Krauss 1882 version of the Zaporozhian reply to English:

"What the hell kind of knight are you: the devil shits and you and your army eat [it]! You Alexandrian beerbrewer, Cossack quiver, Podolian hangman, Armenian pig, swine's snout, mare's asshole, butcher's dog! You're not fit to command the sons of Christians, we'll fight you on land and sea, unbaptized brow, fuck your mother! We don't know the date, we don't have a calendar, but the day with us is the same as with you: kiss our ass!"

=== Kurylin 1894 (published Yavornytsky 1894) ===
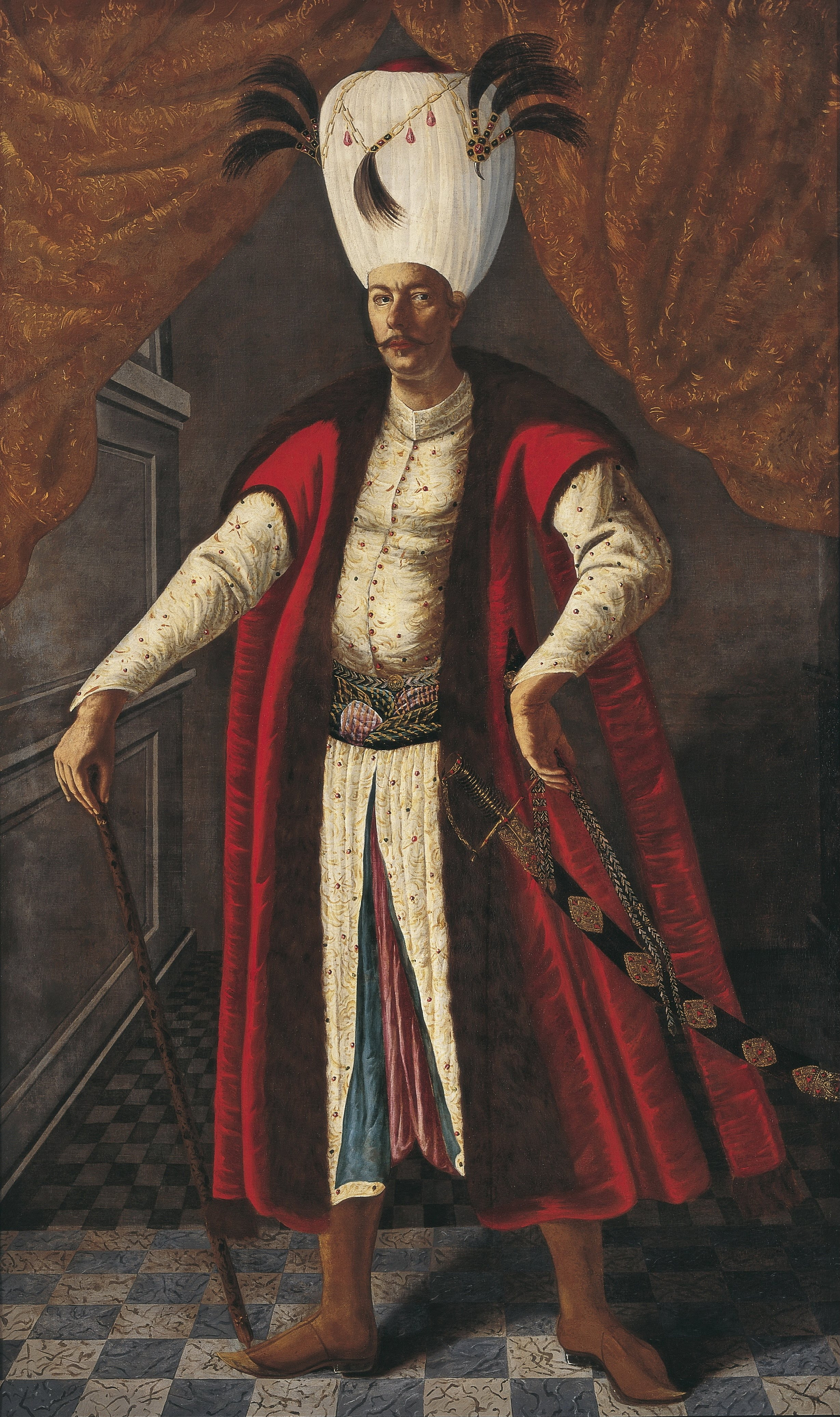
Mehmed IV, Ottoman Sultan 1648–1687

For his 1999 English edition of the text, Andrew Gregorovich, a Canadian librarian with Ukrainian roots, based himself on a version of Yavornytsky (also transliterated as Evarnitsky or Evarnickij) and earlier Yavornytsky-based English translations by Cresson (1919), Ripley's Believe It or Not! (1950), and Guerney (1959). The Yavornytsky version, first published in 1894, goes back to a priest called I. Kurylin from the village of Vyshchetarasivka / Вищетарасівка in the Dnipropetrovsk Oblast (then Yekaterinoslav Governorate). Because it contained only one taboo word as opposed to four in the Kostomarov 1872 version, Friedman (1978) assumed that Yavornytsky's version represented an 'expurgated' edition of a more vulgar original.

Gregorovich rendered sultan Mehmed IV's demand and Ivan Sirko's reply as follows:

Sultan Mehmed IV to the Zaporozhian Cossacks: As the Sultan; son of Muhammad; brother of the sun and moon; grandson and viceroy of God; ruler of the kingdoms of Macedonia, Babylon, Jerusalem, Upper and Lower Egypt; emperor of emperors; sovereign of sovereigns; extraordinary knight, never defeated; steadfast guardian of the tomb of Jesus Christ; trustee chosen by God Himself; the hope and comfort of Muslims; confounder and great defender of Christians – I command you, the Zaporogian Cossacks, to submit to me voluntarily and without any resistance, and to desist from troubling me with your attacks.

[Letter of the Zaporozhian Cossacks of Ukraine replying to the Sultan of Turkey]

Thou Turkish Devil!
Brother and companion to the accursed Devil, and Secretary to Lucifer himself, Greetings!
What the hell kind of noble knight art thou? Satan voids and thy army devours. Never wilt thou be fit to have the sons of Christ under thee. Thy army we fear not, and by land and by sea in our chaikas we will do battle against thee.
Thou scullion of Babylon, thou beer-brewer of Jerusalem, thou goat-thief of Alexandria, thou swineherd of Egypt (both the Greater and the Lesser), thou Armenian pig and Tartar goat. Thou hangman of Kamyanets, thou evildoer of Podolia, thou great silly oaf of all the world and of the netherworld and, before our God, a blockhead, a swine's snout, a mare's ass, and clown of Hades. May the devil take thee!

That is what the Cossacks have to say to thee, thou basest born of runts! Unfit art thou to lord it over true Christians!
The date we know not, for no calender have we got. The moon (month) is in the sky, the year is in a book, and the day is the same with us here as with ye over there - and thou can kiss us thou knowest where!

— Koshovyi Otaman Ivan Sirko, and all the Zaporozhian Cossack Brotherhood

=== Other versions ===
Ukrainian writer Mykola Arkas included a Ukrainian version of the alleged correspondence between the Ottoman sultan and the Zaporozhian Cossacks in his popular book History of Ukraine–Rus' (1912). He commented: 'These letters may be invented, but they are invented very aptly.'

Poet Stepan Rudansky published a Ukrainian poetic edition of the correspondence in Complete Collection of Funny Poems (1915), titled "Ahmet III. and the Zaporozhians". Friedman (1978) noted that it was very different in contents and style from the Kostomarov and Yavornytsky versions, and excluded it from consideration.

== In popular culture ==
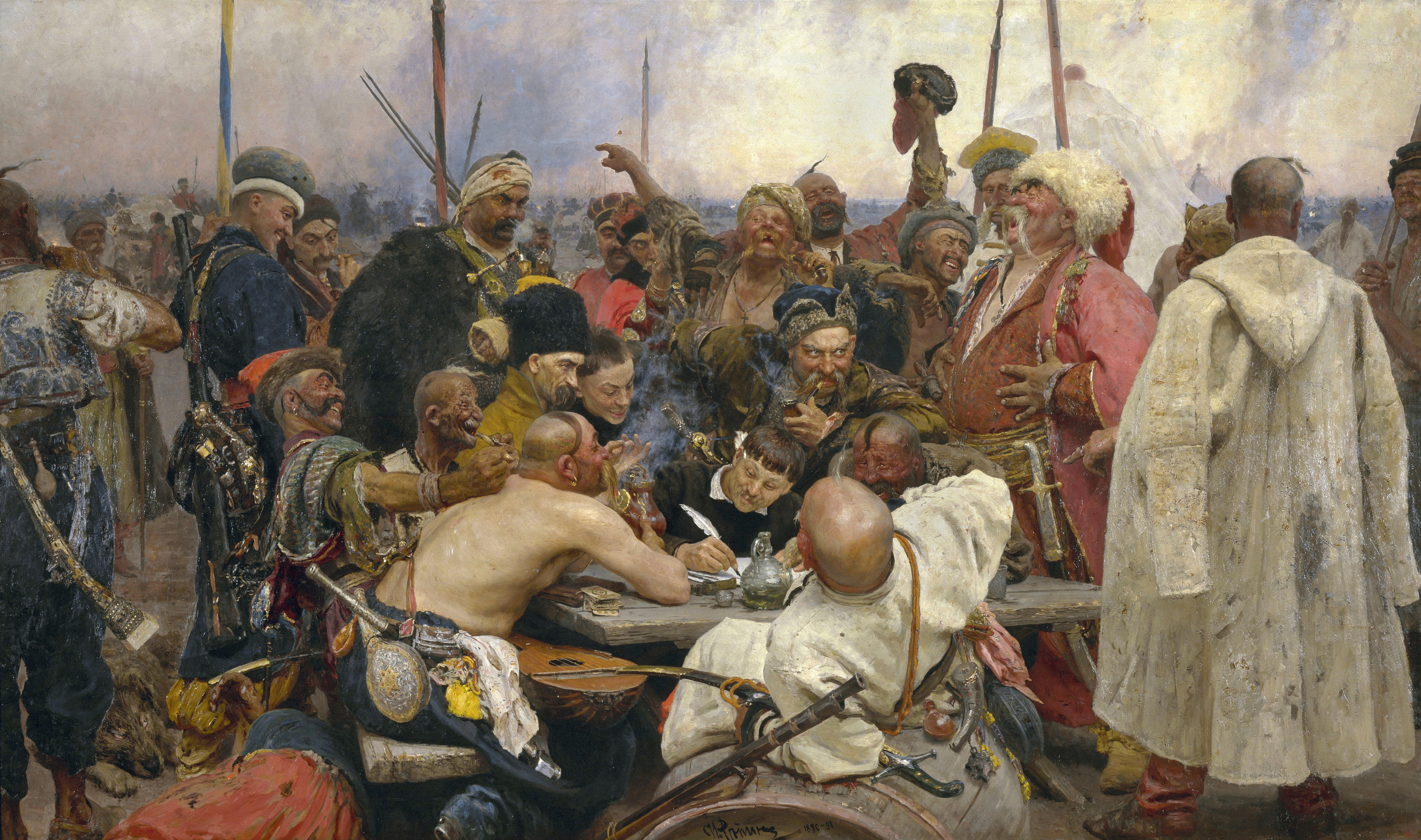
Ilya Repin's Reply of the Zaporozhian Cossacks (c. 1890)

The sultan–Cossack correspondence became extremely popular at the start of the Russo-Turkish War (1877–1878). By then, the most popularised versions of the story centred on the Zaporozhian Cossacks (from "beyond the rapids", Ukrainian: za porohamy), inhabiting the lands around the lower Dnieper River in Ukraine, who had supposedly just defeated Ottoman Empire forces in battle some time in the 1670s. However, despite his army having suffered this loss to them, Ottoman sultan Mehmed IV demanded that the Cossacks submit to Ottoman rule. The Cossacks, led by Ivan Sirko, replied in a characteristic manner; they wrote a letter, replete with insults and profanities. The late-19th-century painting by Ilya Repin, Reply of the Zaporozhian Cossacks, exhibits the Cossacks' pleasure at striving to come up with ever more base vulgarities. In the 19th century, the historical Zaporozhian Cossacks were sometimes the subject of picaresque tales demonstrating admiration of their primitive vitality and contemptuous disregard for authority (in marked contrast to the more civilized subjects of the authoritarian Russian state). In 1913, famous French poet Guillaume Apollinaire wrote his own version of the "Reply of the Zaporozhian Cossacks to the Sultan of Constantinople" as an insert in the "Chanson du mal aimé" poem of his Alcools collection. In turn, this French version was adapted in singing as part of Leo Ferré's oratorio La Chanson du mal-aimé, and a Russian translation was used as one of the poems in Dmitri Shostakovich’s fourteenth symphony.

The correspondence and especially Repin's painting of it played an important role in the development of both Ukrainian and Russian nationalism. Every time the Russian Empire and later the Soviet Union faced some kind of strong enemy, the sultan–Cossack letters resurfaced in numerous variants, for example during the "Great Patriotic War" (the Soviet participation in World War II). During the Soviet-Ukrainian War in 1919, the letter was emulated in an address of Ukrainian Red Army commanders Mykola Shchors and Vasyl Bozhenko to Symon Petliura, commander-in-chief of the Ukrainian People's Republic. After the Dissolution of the Soviet Union, the tradition continued along the new states' lines. When the Russo–Turkish conflict in the Syrian civil war began in the 2015, more than a dozen different versions of the Cossack letter to the Turkish sultan appeared on the Internet, including a musical version that gained hundreds of thousands of views; a popularity that would have been unthinkable in the 17th century. In 2016, British actors Matt Berry and Peter Capaldi gave a dramatic reading of the exchange for Letters Live in English (based on an unknown 19th-century vulgar Muscovite version).

== See also ==
- Correspondence of Paul and Seneca, a 4th-century collection of apocryphal letters forged in the names of Paul the Apostle and Seneca the Younger
- "NUTS!", reply by U.S. officer Anthony McAuliffe to German commander von Lüttwitz's demand to surrender during the 1944 Siege of Bastogne
- Reply of the Zaporozhian Cossacks, famous late-19th-century painting by Ilya Repin inspired by the alleged correspondence between the Ottoman sultan and the Cossacks
- Russian warship, go fuck yourself, reply by a Ukrainian soldier to a demand to surrender by Russian cruiser Moskva during the 2022 Russian invasion of Ukraine

== Bibliography ==
- Chuhlib, Taras (2020). "Vienna Letter to Sultan Mehmed IV Avji from Ukrainian Cossaks in Chyhyryn". Journal of Southeastern European Studies. 35 (35). Istanbul University Press: 89–96. doi:10.26650/gaad.797502. S2CID 243964013.
- Friedman, Victor A. (1978). "The Zaporozhian Letter to the Turkish Sultan: Historical Commentary and Linguistic Analysis". Slavica Hierosolymitana. 2. Magnes Press: 25–38.
- Maier, Ingrid (2006). "„Ontsegh-brief van den Turckschen Keyser ...": Ein fiktiver Brief des türkischen Sultans an den König von Polen in russischer Übersetzung (1621)" ["Letter of refusal of the Turkish Emperor...": A fictional letter of the Turkish sultan to the king of Poland in Russian translation (1621)]. Jako blagopesnivaja ptica: hyllningsskrift till Lars Steensland (in German, Dutch, and Russian). Stockholm: Acta Universitatis Stockholmiensis. pp. 135–146. ISBN 91-85445-40-1.
- Poliakov, Ivan Anatol'evich (2018). ""Азбука фряская" князя С.В. Ромодановского и новые списки грамот из цикла "Легендарной переписки турецкого султана"" ["ABC Fryaska" Prince S.V. Romodanovsky and new copies of letters from the cycle "Legendary Correspondence of the Turkish Sultan"] (PDF). Древняя Русь. Вопросы медиевистики (in Russian). 71 (1). Institute for Slavic Studies of the Russian Academy of Sciences: 89–99.
- Pylypenko, Volodymyr (2019). "Provoking a War: Polish Fake Documents in Warsaw's 17th century Eastern Policy" (PDF). Propaganda in the World and Local Conflicts. 6 (1). Academic Publishing House Researcher: 3–7. doi:10.13187/pwlc.2019.1.3. S2CID 241220914. Archived from the original on 14 November 2019.
- Shamin, Stepan Mikhailovich (25 December 2020). "Степан Михайлович Шамин. "Памфлет" и "курьез": как запорожцы писали письмо турецкому султану" [Stepan Mikhailovich Shamin: "Pamphlet" and "curiosity": how the Cossacks wrote a letter to the Turkish Sultan]. YouTube (in Russian). Institute of Russian History.
- Waugh, Daniel Clarke (1971). "On the Origin of the "Correspondence" between the Sultan and the Cossacks" (PDF). Recenzija: A Review of Soviet Ukrainian Scholarly Publications. 1 (2). Harvard University: 3–46.
- Waugh, Daniel Clarke (1978). The Great Turkes Defiance: On the History of the Apocryphal Correspondence of Ottoman Sultan in its Muscovite and Russian Variants. Columbus, Ohio: Slavica Publishers. ISBN 9780893570569.
- Waugh, Daniel Clarke (2019). "The Great Turkes Defiance Revisited" (PDF). Slověne. 8 (1). Open Journal Systems: 162–187. doi:10.31168/2305-6754.2019.8.1.6. S2CID 203476863.
