= Stand on the Sich (1679) =

Battle between Zaporozhian Cossacks and the Ottoman Empire

- Part of the Russo-Turkish War (1676–1681) and Ottoman-Cossack Conflict
Date	August 1679
Location	Lobodukha tract, outside of the Chortomlyk Sich
Result	Cossack victory
Territorial changes	End of Sirko's conflict with Ottomans

Belligerents
Zaporozhian Cossacks	Ottoman Empire; Crimean Khanate

Commanders and leaders
Ivan Sirko	(Ottoman Empire) Kara-Muhammad

Strength
Unknown	25,000

The Stand on the Sich took place between the Ottoman-Crimean army led by Pasha Kara-Muhammad and the Zaporozhian Cossacks led by Ivan Sirko, on the Lobodukha tract between islands, outside of the Chortomlyk Sich, in 1679.

== Prelude ==
In 1678, information about the planned Ottoman campaigns on Kyiv and Left-Bank Ukraine in the upcoming year became known to Tsardom of Russia and Samoylovych's Cossack Hetmanate. Sultan Mehmed IV planned a campaign against Sich for 1679, gathering an Ottoman fleet led Pasha Kara-Muhammad for this purpose,. Sultan wanted to punish the Zaporozhians for their sabotage actions against Ottomans during the Chyhyryn campaign last year. Sirko's successes in 1679 also contributed to this.

== Stand ==
Sultan Mehmed IV sent the Ottoman fleet led by Pasha Kara-Muhammad up the Dnieper with the goal of destroying Sich. The Ottoman-Crimean army consisted of 25,000 troops. This news reached Ivan Sirko, but he didn't want to risk the destruction of Sich and chose to position with Cossacks on Lobodukha tract outside of Sich. On 25 August, Sirko's Cossacks chose a defensive position. Ivan Sirko organized his defense on the Lobodukha tract between islands, preparing for battle with the Ottoman army.

Sirko chosen a favourable defensive position, expecting a large-scale battle. Tsar Feodor III learnt about this, so he sent a large army to assist Sirko. Soon, Pasha Kara-Muhammad received the news about an incoming Russian army led by Yakov Koretsky, coming to the aid of Ivan Sirko and his Cossacks. Sirko's defensive position, combined with the news of incoming Russian assistance, made Pasha Kara-Muhammad retreat with his army.

== Aftermath ==
Ivan Sirko's defense and the news of Russian assistance detreated Ottoman-Crimean army, making them retreat. Zaporozhian Sich demonstrated its ability to resist the invaders. This became known as Sirko's last major military action, before retiring to the village of Hrushivka at an old age, where he died on 1 August 1680 from natural causes. Russians and Cossacks repelled the Crimean attacks that took place in 1679–1680, and on 3 January 1681, signed Treaty of Bakhchisarai, concluding the Russo-Turkish War.

== See also ==
- Battle of the Sich (1674)
- Destruction of the Chortomlyk Sich (1709)
- The History of the Zaporizhian Cossacks (Myshetsky) (written in the 1740s)
- Liquidation of the autonomy of the Cossack Hetmanate (1764–1765)
- Liquidation of the Zaporizhian Sich (1775)
