= Battle of Kuialnyk =

- Part of the Ottoman-Cossack Conflict
Date	Early 1672
Location	Kuialnyk
Result	Cossack victory

Belligerents
Zaporozhian Cossacks	Crimean Khanate; Budjak Horde (Ottoman Empire) Ottoman Janissaries

Commanders and leaders
Ivan Sirko; Mykhailo Khanenko	Nurredin-Sultan; Murza Tenmambet (POW)

Strength
Unknown	10,000

Casualties and losses
Unknown	Heavy combat losses; 3 captured

The Battle of Kuialnyk took place between the Zaporozhian Cossacks and Crimean-Budjak-Ottoman Janissary forces, when the Cossacks were returning from their campaign in Wallachia, resulting in a Cossack victory and capture of Budjak Murza, at the beginning of 1672.

== Prelude ==
Ivan Sirko and Mykhailo Khanenko jointly took part in a campaign into Wallachia, where they ravaged several settlements and were returning with loot. Cossacks were passing through the lands of Budjak Horde and were in the steppe beyond Kuialnyk. They encountered Crimean lord Nurredin-Sultan, who was moving from Ochakiv together with Budjak Murza Tenmambet, while being accompanied by Ottoman Janissaries with cannon.

== Battle ==
Nurredin-Sultan was meant to head to Crimea while Murza Tenmambet was heading to Budjak after assisting Doroshenko for four months, but he encountered the Cossacks and joined battle with them on the Kuialnyk river. Tatar-Turkish forces attempted to fire at the Cossacks from cannon, but these cannos exploded and didn't inflict any casualties on the Cossacks. The Cossacks defeated the Tatar-Turkish forces and Nurredin-Sultan fled to Crimea. Murza Tenmambet was captured by the Cossacks, along with three other Tatars.

== Aftermath ==
After this battle, the Cossacks reached the Bug where Sirko's Cossacks expected to be paid for their work, but they were promised payment only after giving further assistance to the Polish king in Ukrainian cities. However, Sirko's Cossacks weren't paid for their work, which left them dissatisfied and they blamed Sirko for switching to the side of Poland-Lithuania, threatening to return to Tsardom of Russia. Sirko himself eventually returned to the Left-Bank where he sought to be pardoned by Russian Tsardom.
