= Battle of the Sich (1674) =

1674 conflict

- Part of the Russo-Turkish War (1672–1681) and Ottoman-Cossack Conflict
Date	19 December 1674
Location	Chortomlyk Sich
Result	Cossack victory

Belligerents
Zaporozhian Cossacks	Ottoman Empire; Crimean Khanate

Commanders and leaders
Ivan Sirko	(Ottoman Empire) Mehmed IV; Selim I Giray

Strength
150–350; Estimated garrison: 2,000	(Ottoman Empire) 15,000; 40,000

Casualties and losses
50 killed 80 wounded	(Ottoman Empire) 13,500 killed; 150 captured Heavy

The Battle of the Sich took place between the Ottoman-Crimean army and the Zaporozhian Cossacks, during the Ottoman-Crimean campaign into the Zaporozhian Sich (at the time the Chortomlyk Sich, at night on 19 December 1674. The only detailed description of this battle appears in the Samiilo Velychko Chronicle.

== Prelude ==
Sultan Mehmed IV and Khan Selim I Giray planned a campaign into the Sich with the goal of destroying it, thus ending the frequent Cossack campaigns and raids of Ivan Sirko into their lands. In autumn of 1674, Sultan sent 15,000 Ottoman Janissaries to Crimea. In total, 15,000 Janissaries and 40,000 Tatars were to take part in the campaign.

== Battle ==
Turkish-Tatar army launched their campaign into the Sich once the rivers froze, at night to avoid getting detected. The Khan used captured Cossacks to gain access into Sich, expecting to take Cossacks by surprise as they were asleep. However, they were noticed by a Cossack named Shevchuk or Chefchika, who alerted his comrades, and made the presence of intruders in the Sich known to the other 150–350 Cossacks, which allowed them to react on time and equip their guns. Cossacks launched an attack on the Turkish-Tatar army, firing at them with muskets from all directions, which put the Turkish-Tatar army into the state of disorganized panic. Each shot killed 2–3 Janissaries due to lack of space between the Sich Kurins, not allowing Janissaries to move freely. Janissaries couldn't fire back either. Cossacks took advantage of the panic among Janissaries, taking out their sabres and getting into hand combat with them. As a result, nearly all Ottoman Janissaries were wiped out. Khan Selim I Giray hastily retreated back to Crimea with remnants of Turkish-Tatar army before the 2,000 Cossack cavalrymen could catch up to them.

== Aftermath ==
Cossacks came out victorious. 13,500 Turks were killed and 150 were captured. Tatars also suffered heavy losses. Cossacks suffered 50 killed and 80 wounded. Cossacks disposed of enemy corpses by throwing them in wholes of frozen river, under the ice. As a result of this battle, Ottomans ceased their attempts of destroying Cossacks militarily. Later, Ivan Sirko with Cossacks sent a reply to Khan Selim I Giray. They wrote:

We, the Cossack troops of the Sich, would never have conceived the idea of entering upon this war had you not commenced hostilities. You have sent against us (what treachery!) not only your savage Tartars, but also the troops of that old fool, the Sultan. Had it not been for the intervention of our constant friend, the great Lord Jesus — we might all have perished in our sleep! Now, since your disloyal ways have brought upon you disaster — refrain from troubling us. Otherwise, we will treat you after our fashion, and that of our noble Cossack ancestors, by beating down your own gates! We wish your Majesty a long and prosperous reign.

Nonetheless, Sirko agreed to the Khan's request to release 150 Janissary captives as part of ransom. Initially, Sirko blamed Petro Doroshenko for the attack in a separate letter, but Doroshenko in his reply assured Sirko he has nothing to do with it. Ivan Sirko wanted revenge for the attack on Sich, this inspired his Crimean Campaign in 1675.

== Historicity ==
The historicity of this battle was initially doubted due to its only mention appearing in Samiilo Velychko Chronicle. However, it was later discovered that this battle is also mentioned in the chronicle of Rigelman, but in less detail.

== See also ==
- Stand on the Sich (1679)
- Destruction of the Chortomlyk Sich (1709)
- The History of the Zaporizhian Cossacks (Myshetsky) (written in the 1740s)
- Liquidation of the autonomy of the Cossack Hetmanate (1764–1765)
- Liquidation of the Zaporizhian Sich (1775)

== Bibliography ==
- Velichko, Samoylov (1851) [1720]. Летопись событий в юго-западной России в XVII-м веке [Chronicle of events in Southwestern Russia in the 17th century] (in Russian). Vol. 2. Опубликовано временной комиссией для разбора древних актов (Published by temporary commission for reviewing ancient acts). Kiev: Типография Иосифа Вальнера.
- Ригельман; Бодянский, Александр Иванович; Осип Максимович (1847) [1785]. Летописное повествование о Малой России и ее народе и козаках вообще [The chronicle narrative about Little Russia and its people and the Cossacks in general] (in Russian). Vol. 4. Moscow: О-во истории и древностей рос.
- Sobchenko, Ivan Sergeevich (2020). Kosh Otaman of Zaporozhian Sich I.D. Sirko (in Russian). Moscow: Ваш формат.
- Penn, William (1919). The Cossacks;. Palala Press. ISBN 1355521025.
- Yavornytskyi, Dmytro (2004). Tvory (in Ukrainian). Vol. 1. Tandem-U. ISBN 966-7482-31-6.
- Kostomarov, N. (1995). Ruina (in Russian). Moscow Charli. ISBN 586859018X.
