= Blockade of the Kerch Strait =

- Part of the Cossack raids
Date	6 July – 14 September 1655
Location	Eastern Crimea
Result	Taman, Caffa and Sudak sacked by Cossacks. Cossack attack on Kerch repulsed by Tatars.

Belligerents
Zaporozhian Cossacks; Don Cossacks	Crimean Khanate; Ottoman Empire

Commanders and leaders
Ivan Sirko; Ataman Dergun; Pavel Chesnochikhin	Mehmed IV Giray; Adil Giray

Strength
200–700; 700–2,030; 34–43 boats	Unknown (Ottoman Empire) Unknown 100,000 (Heavily exaggerated) (Note: The total population of the Crimean Khanate in the mid 17th century, which was around 180,000, couldn't physically sustain such a massive army. Even a nation with 20% of their total male population as soldiers could only make up about 18,000 men. Add onto this that most of the forces have to go raid Eastern Europe. Not even this total force of a few thousand men could all just join this one battle.)

Casualties and losses
30 killed	Unknown
- 400 Tatar civilians enslaved

From 6 July to 14 September 1655, the Zaporozhian–Don Cossacks blockaded the Kerch Strait (Note: Turkish: Kerç Boğazı Ablukası Ukrainian: Блокада Керченської протоки Crimean Tatar: Kerç Boğazını Qapaması Nogai: Kerç Bogazın Toqtatu) to delay Crimean support for Poland-Lithuania.

== Prelude ==
In 1654, Cossack conducted a campaign in Crimea during summer. In 1655, Cossack-Russian army intended to send their main forces for offensives in Western Ukraine. However, this left Ukrainian territories vulnerable to Tatar attacks from the south, who were allied with Poland–Lithuania. Tatars intended to come to the Polish–Lithuanian assistance on 16 July. Cossacks conducted a number of raids in late April and early May on Tatar and Ottoman territories to deter them. Sultan Mehmed IV was dissatisfied with Khan Mehmed IV Giray's support for Poles in their war, since it left Ottoman territories vulnerable to Cossack raids. Rumours later spread about more attacks that will come from Cossacks and Kalmyks on Crimea, this caused the Khan to gather an army near Perekop and put out patrols to monitor any activity, withholding their planned campaign for defense. However, Cossacks were going to conduct a campaign on the sea in the part of Crimea where they were least expected. Cossacks were set out for campaign, led by Zaporozhian Ataman Dergun and Don commander Pavel Chesnochikhin. Ivan Sirko was among organizers of the campaign. Kalmyks were unable to take part in the campaign due to plague in Astrakhan.

The number of Cossacks that took part in campaign is difficult to calculate. Different sources put number of Cossacks at 900–3,000. More precise estimates give figures of 700–2,030 Don and 200–700 Zaporozhian Cossacks.

== Blockade ==
On July 6, Cossack boats entered the Kerch Strait. Cossacks kept the Kerch blocked for 10 days, keeping the population of Kerch and Taman in fear, while ravaging Tatar villages nearby. On July 15, Cossacks captured Taman. Cossack capture of the city was accompanied by massacre of residents. From Taman, Cossacks ravaged Azov and Black Sea coasts of Crimea. On July 22, Cossacks attacked Kerch, which was more difficult to seize as it was defended by Ottoman Sipahi cavalry, while Khan sent reinforcements to Kerch garrison. Cossacks were repulsed in a stubborn battle, but many Turkish-Tatar troops were killed or wounded in process.

In early August, Cossacks captured Sudak and Kefe, plundering these cities. Throughout summer months, Cossacks dominated the Crimean coast. Several galley penal servitudes were sent from Istanbul against Cossacks, but they were defeated and captured in a boarding battle. Cossacks ravaged Eastern Crimea until 14 September, when "the whether was great in autumn and there were frequent winds on the sea", Cossacks returned from their campaign to the Don region.

== Aftermath ==
The Cossack campaign was successful. Cossack seizure of Taman Peninsula during their campaign allowed them to terrorize entirety of Crimea. Cossacks freed 225 captives and taken 400 Tatars captive. Cossacks suffered 30 killed during the campaign. Cossacks succeeded in their goal of delaying Tatar forces for two months, until mid-September. Tatars themselves were indecisive in their actions and for a long time didn't risk going beyond Perekop due to the fear of Cossack and Kalmyk attacks.

Despite the success and great benefit of the Cossack actions, Tsarist authorities didn't want to provoke Ottomans. On February 1656, Tsar officially announced restrictions on Don Cossacks in regards to their raiding on Crimea.
