= Siege of Perekop (1663) =

Cossack-Russian-Kalmyk victory over the Ottomans

- Part of the Russo-Polish War (1654–1667), Russo-Crimean Wars and Cossack raids
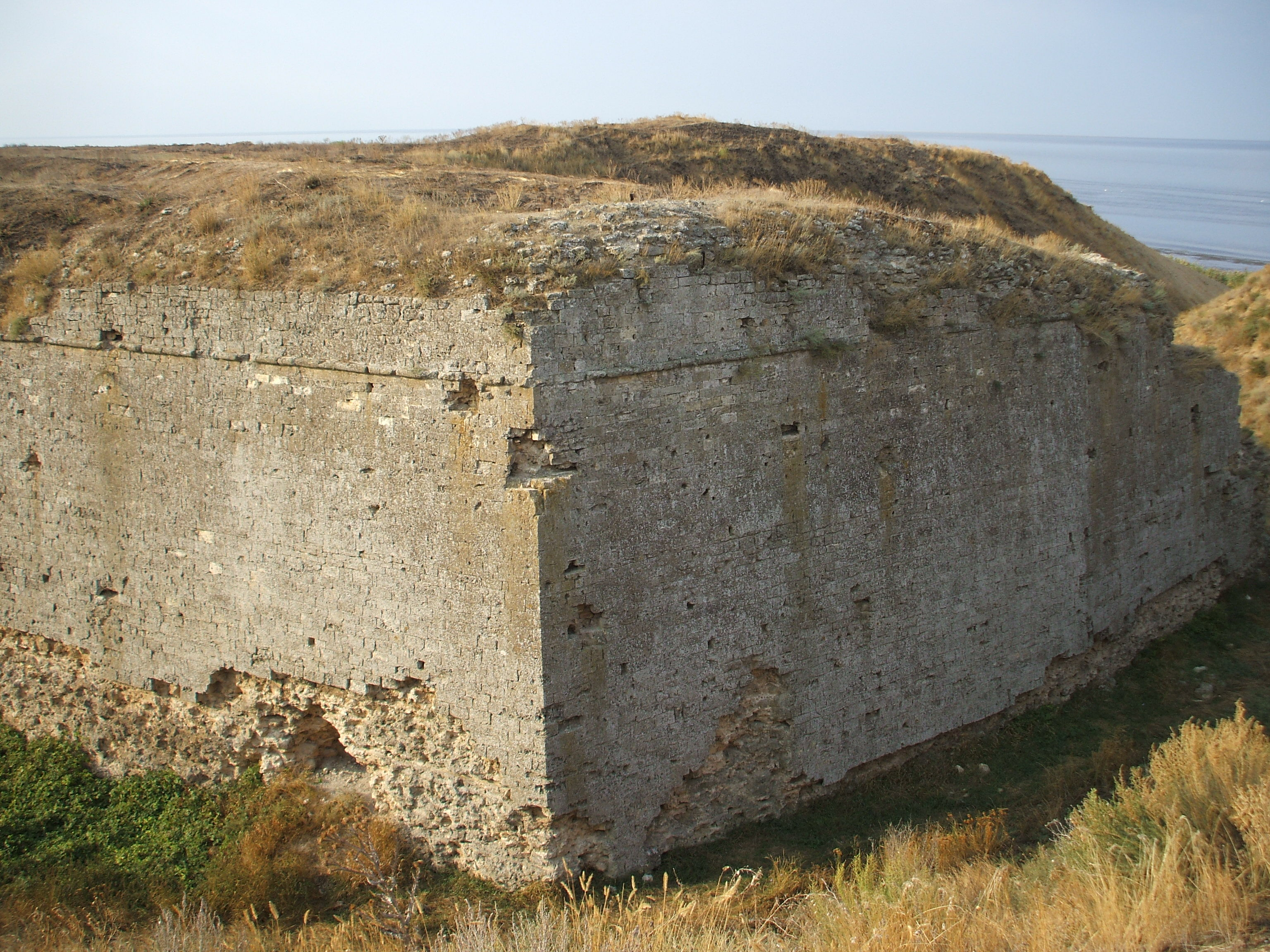
- Remains of Ferch-Kermen citadel tower
| Date | 11 October – 16 December 1663 |
| Location | Perekop, Crimea |
| Result | Cossack-Russian-Kalmyk victory |
| Territorial changes | Sack of Perekop and nearby settlements |

Belligerents
| Zaporozhian Cossacks; Don Cossacks; Tsardom of Russia; Kalmyk Khanate | Crimean Khanate (Ottoman Empire) Ottoman Janissaries |

Commanders and leaders
| Ivan Sirko; Ivan Gladkiy; Stenka Razin (Tsardom of Russia) Grigory Kosagov (WIA); Erke Aturkay | Murad Giray; Karach Bey †; Murza Karabcha |

Strength
| October: Unknown; December: 180 | October: 5,000+ December: 1,000 |

Casualties and losses
| October: Moderate; December: Unknown | October: Heavy; December: Almost all killed |

The siege of Perekop took place between the Crimeans together with Ottoman janissary forces and the Cossack-Russian forces together with their Kalmyk allies, with destruction of Perekop and surrounding settlements, between 11 October to 16 December 1663.

== Prelude ==
Crimean Khanate assisted Poland-Lithuania during the Russo-Polish War and played an important role in many battles. Ivan Sirko and Grigory Kosagov aimed to devastate Perekop fortress, launching a number of raids that would weaken its defenses and undermine Tatar aspirations in the war. Ivan Gladkiy and Stenka Razin took part in these campaigns. Murad Giray was appointed to lead the defense of Perekop.

== Campaigns ==
=== First campaign ===
On October 11, at night, Cossack-Russian forces begun their assault on Perekop. Sirko commanded infantry units, while Kosagov cavalry units. Infantry attacked Perekop from Crimean side, while cavalry attacked from Russian side.

Cossack-Russian forces managed to capture most of the fortress, but the Janissaries entrenched in the small stone fort within Perekop. While Cossack-Russian forces were trying to capture the fort, 5,000 Ottoman Janissaries and Tatars appeared from nearby villages to assist the besieged Janissaries inside Perekop. Cossack-Russian forces set Perekop on fire, taking many Tatar and Turk captives before being forced to retreat to avoid encirclement. They still had to repel the Turkish-Tatar attacks in process of retreating.

Cossack-Russian forces managed to retreat out of Perekop, but suffered noticeable losses in process. However, Kosagov in his letter to Tsar wrote that his unit managed to avoid significant losses, but he himself was lightly wounded on the leg. Sirko ordered to execute all Tatar and Turk male captives.

Rumours spread about the planned Polish-Tatar invasion of Sich, leading to mass desertions within Kosagov's ranks. Sirko managed to keep his Cossacks under control and Kalmyk troops later arrived to assist Cossack-Russian forces in their attacks on Perekop.

=== Second campaign ===
On December 6, Ivan Sirko led 90 Zaporozhian Cossacks, together with 30 Don Cossacks and 60 Kalmyk troops. Sirko wanted to disrupt the Tatar campaign in support of Polish forces. Cossacks ravaged several Tatar villages and freed over a hundred Rus' captives.

On December 16, Cossacks crushed the Tatar army led by Karach Bey, who was killed with his associates. Tatars numbered 1,000 troops, Kalmyks didn't take Tatar prisoners and killed everyone. Cossack-Russian forces with Kalmyk allies devastated Perekop and its fortifications.

== Aftermath ==
Khan Mehmed IV Giray was forced to reduce his support for Poland–Lithuania and had to divert Tatar forces to defense of Crimea from Cossack-Kalmyk attacks. This turned out to be of the main factors in the outcome of the siege of Hlukhiv.

These campaigns increased the respect, fear and popularity of Ivan Sirko among Cossacks, describing the attitudes surrounding Sirko:

″Everyone was unusually afraid of him; whatever he thought up; he would do, and if anyone wanted to disobey him [Sirko], they would immediately kill him.″
