= Siege of Ochakov (1670) =

- Part of the Cossack raids
Date	20 June 1670
Location	Ochakov, Ottoman Empire
Result	Cossack victory

Belligerents
Zaporozhian Cossacks	Ottoman Empire; Crimean Khanate; Wallachia

Commanders and leaders
Ivan Sirko	Unknown

Strength
Unknown	Unknown

Casualties and losses
Unknown	Entire force killed or captured

The siege of Ochakov (Note: Turkish: Özi Kuşatması Ukrainian: Облога Очакова Crimean Tatar: Öçekiv Qamalı Romanian: Asediul Oceacov) was carried out by the Zaporozhian Cossacks led by Ivan Sirko against the Ottoman-Crimean forces and allied Wallachian detachment, on 20 June 1670.

== Prelude ==
Ivan Sirko was dissatisfied with Ottoman control in the region. Sirko raided Ochakov in the past and planned to do it again to undermine Turkish-Tatar influence. In addition, Sirko saw this campaign as an opportunity to demonstrate his readiness to serve the Tsar again. Sirko fully broke his ties with Doroshenko in 1670 and was unwilling to align with Turks or Tatars.

== Siege ==
On June 20, Ivan Sirko led Cossacks on a campaign to Ochakov. Cossacks besieged Ochakov. They fortified themselves near the city and made several sorties. Later, Cossacks broke into it and stormed it. Cossacks didn't attempt to storm Ochakov citadel but captured the city itself and plundered it. The Ottoman-Crimean-Wallachian garrison was unable to stop Cossacks, they were either killed or captured. Cossacks set the city on fire after looting it, including taking Turk, Tatar and Wallachian prisoners with them. In addition, Cossacks took livestock and moveable property with them.

== Aftermath ==
Cossacks successfully looted and burnt Ochakov. On July 18, Ivan Sirko informed Grigory Romodanovsky about his successful raid on Ochakov. Sirko also informed Tsar Alexis about the successful siege, using this as an opportunity to request Kalmyk assistance and military supplies. This campaign was intended as a message for Istanbul and Bakhchysarai, that they shouldn't feel comfortable on "ancient Ukrainian lands".

== Bibliography ==
- Yavornytskyi, Dmytro (2004). Tvory (in Ukrainian). Vol. 1. Tandem-U. ISBN 966-7482-31-6.
