= Battle of Igren =

Semi-legendary battle between Crimean Khanate and Zaporozhian Cossacks

- Part of the Ottoman-Cossack Conflict
Date	Summer 1660
Location	Igren Peninsula, Samara River
Result	Cossack victory

Belligerents
Zaporozhian Cossacks	Crimean Khanate

Commanders and leaders
Ivan Sirko	Unknown

Strength
Unknown, several times less	10,000

Casualties and losses
Unknown	Almost all killed

The Battle of Igren is a semi-legendary battle that took place between the Tatar army of Crimean Khanate and the Zaporozhian Cossacks of Ivan Sirko, near Stanovoy and other adjacent islands, Samara River on Igren Peninsula, during summer of 1660.

== Prelude ==
Tatars conducted a raid, during which they captured 15,000 people and were planning to go back to Crimea with the captives. The Tatar army numbered around 10,000.

== Battle ==
Tatars were going to cross the Samara River in order to return to Crimea with their exploits. Ivan Sirko knew about this, and with his Cossacks set up an ambush for an incoming Tatar army. As the Tatars were crossing the river, Sirko made his battle cry and with Cossacks launched a surprise attack on the unsuspecting Tatar army. Cossacks inflicted a crushing defeat on the vastly more numerous Tatar army, slaughtering it. Only a few Tatars managed to escape. Tatars expected to cross the river without anyone intervening, which backfired. According to a local legend, as the surviving Tatars were fleeing the battle, they yelled out "Ogren! Ogren!", which in Turkic meant: "Cursed, Cursed [Place]!".

== Aftermath and legacy ==
Cossacks freed 15,000 people taken captive by Tatars. Tatars in Crimea were mourning their dead on Samara River for a whole week. After this battle, Monastery island became a property of Sich Cossacks. Sirko's victory here became well-known. Archeologists found artifacts related to this battle. According to local folk legends, after Tatars suffered a crushing defeat, they named this place "Ogren", the locals then changed the name to "Igren", and that's how they began calling the peninsula.

== Historicity ==
For a long time, this battle was considered to be legendary, largely relying on accounts of local folk legends. However, archeologists later discovered a number of historical artifacts on Igren Peninsula, among which there were rusty sabres and Tatar arrowheads, supporting historicity of the battle.
