= Ochakiv–Aslan campaign =

- Part of the Cossack raids
Date	April 1660
Location	Ochakiv, Aslan-Kermen, Ottoman Empire
Result	Cossack victory

Belligerents
Zaporozhian Cossacks; Don Cossacks	Ottoman Empire; Crimean Khanate; Nogai Horde

Commanders and leaders
Ivan Sirko	(Ottoman Empire) Pasha of Silistra; Nurredin-Sultan

Strength
10,000; 5,000 Sirko's "Hunter" Cossacks	(Ottoman Empire) Unknown; 80,000+

Casualties and losses
Unknown	Heavy

The Ochakiv–Aslan campaign or Ochakov–Aslan campaign (Note: Turkish: Özi–Aslan Seferi Ukrainian: Очаківсько-Асланський похід Crimean Tatar: Öçekiv–Aslan Cengi Nogai: Öçäkiv–Aslan Cengi) was carried out by the Zaporozhian–Don Cossacks against the Ottoman–Crimean–Nogai forces, before easter in 1660.

== Prelude ==
In spring 1660, Khan Mehmed IV Giray made a promise to King John II Casimir about sending 80,000-strong Tatar army in a joint campaign against the Cossack Hetmanate and Tsardom of Russia. During the same spring, Nurredin-Sultan reported to have arrived to Ochakiv with the Crimean–Nogai army. Sultan Mehmed IV the feared Cossack raids, so he ordered Silistria Pasha to go to Arslan–Kermen city, to block Cossack access through the Dnieper. Sirko discovered Ottoman plans and organised a campaign to disrupt this.

== Campaign ==
Ivan Sirko led 5,000 of his "hunter" Cossacks, which were specialized in operations against Turkish–Tatar forces. In total, there were 10,000 Cossacks, including Don army. Sirko led his Cossacks to Ochakiv. This is where the main Turkish-Tatar army was concentrated. Other Cossacks were sent to storm Aslan-Kermen. These units were preparing to assist Poland-Lithuania. Cossacks attacked at the same time and took the Turkish-Tatar forces by surprise. Cossacks killed or captured many Turks and Tatars. After this, Cossacks returned to the Sich with many Turkish-Tatar captives.

== Aftermath ==
After the successful campaign, Cossacks sold the Turkish–Tatar captives into slavery to Pereiaslav and other Ukrainian cities. The Turkish–Tatar army remained near Ochakiv and Budjak without making any major incursions for 5 months. Polish–Lithuanian authorities didn't even give any orders, which further angered Khan Mehmed IV Giray. Some of the Turkish–Tatar units split from the main army and launched their own raids, which wasn't opposed by their command. One of these was a 390-strong Tatar detachment that was defeated by Sirko's Cossacks while returning from the campaign.

== Bibliography ==
- Апанович, О. М. (1961). Запорізька Січ у боротьбі проти турецько-татарської агресії (in Ukrainian). Київ: Вид-во АН УРСР.
