= Siege of Dunkirk (1646) =

1646 siege of Dunkirk

- Part of the Thirty Years' War and the Eighty Years' War
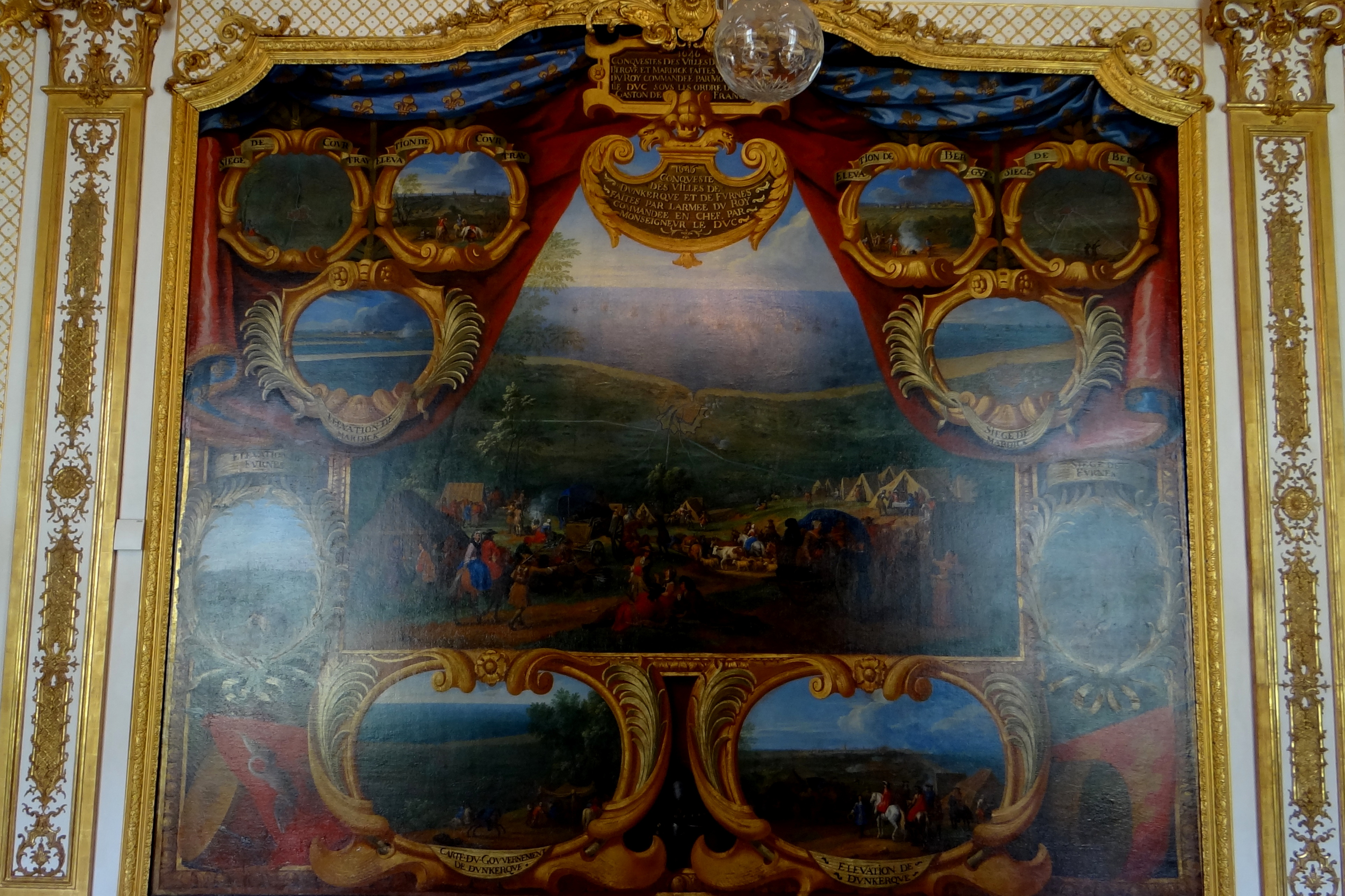
- Depiction of the siege by Sauveur Le Conte
| Date | 7 September – 11 October 1646 |
| Location | Dunkirk, Spanish Netherlands (Modern day France) |
| Result | Franco-Dutch victory |

Belligerents
| Kingdom of France; Dutch Republic | (Spanish Empire) Spain; (Spanish Empire) Spanish Netherlands |

Commanders and leaders
| (Kingdom of France) Louis II, Condé (Dutch Republic) Maarten Tromp | (Spanish Empire) Guillaume de Lede |

The siege of Dunkirk was a siege commenced by France under the command of Louis, le Grand Condé with naval support of the Dutch Republic under the command of admiral Maarten Tromp, who were able to blockade the city to help Condé's siege.

== Background ==
Before Condé besieged Dunkirk, he first captured surrounding cities. He first besieged and captured Bergues, and besieged Mardyck on 4 August, which fell on the 25th with the help of the naval blockade of Tromp. Condé's plan to completely isolate Dunkirk was finally achieved after he took Veurne on 7 September. Condé then marched towards Dunkirk, with an army that likely consisted of Polish infantry, which would be the start of the fraternity between the two nations.

== Siege ==
After taking Veurne, Dunkirk would finally be isolated. Condé would arrive before the city and started to set up camps and dig trenches. Tromp arrived shortly after on the 18th with a fleet of 10 ships. With Tromp's fleet finally arriving, Condé got the opportunity to invest the city. Though the Spanish did try their best to resist the attack by Condé, they had no choice but to surrender.

== Aftermath ==
The loss of Dunkirk meant that Spain lost one of its major ports among the Flemish coats. Which would have serious consequences to Spanish interests and the relief of the final pressure point on the Dutch Republic due to the Dunkirkers.

After the capture of Dunkirk, the Dutch would create a truce with the Spanish, and would eventually abandon their French allies following the peace of Münster. The Spanish, taking advantage of the Fronde in France, recaptured Dunkirk in 1652.

== Legacy ==
On June 17, 2017, a commemorative plaque dedicated to Zaporozhian Cossacks was unveiled by Ukrainian embassy in presence of the Mayor of Dunkirk, Patrice Vergriete.

== Participation of the Cossacks ==
There are sources claiming that Zaporozhian Cossacks participated in the storming of the city. This version, however, is not accepted by the Polish historian Zbigniew Wujiecek, who concluded that Polish soldiers led by colonel Przyemski. A little later. A Ukrainian historian Ivan Wergun has confirmed that some of the links allegedly confirming the participation of the Cossacks are fictitious.

== Sources ==
- Panhuysen, Luc (2021). Het monsterschip, Maarten Tromp en de armada van 1639. Atlas Contact. ISBN 9789045040721.
- Pike, John (2021). The Thirty Years War, 1618–1648, The First Global War and the End of the Habsburg Supremacy (E-book ed.). Pen & Sword Books. ISBN 9781526775788.
- Doedens, Anne (2008). Witte de With 1599-1658, wereldwijde strijd op zee in de Gouden Eeuw (E-book ed.). Uitgeverij Verloren. ISBN 9789087040604.
