= Sirko's Sloboda–Dnieper campaign =

Sloboda–Dnieper campaign
- Part of the Left-bank Uprising
Date	4 March – May 1668
Location	Sloboda, Dnieper Ukraine
Result	See § Aftermath

Belligerents
Sirko's Cossacks	Tsardom of Russia

Commanders and leaders
Ivan Sirko	Grigory Romodanovsky; Fyodor Repka †; Lev Sytin

The Sloboda–Dnieper campaign was organised and carried out by Zaporozhian Cossack rebel leader Ivan Sirko against Tsardom of Russia as part of Left-bank Uprising, from 4 March to May 1668.

== Prelude ==
In 1668, Ivan Sirko held a position of Zmiev colonel. As the uprising against Tsar begun, Sirko himself became convinced of the injustices that "Moscow boyars and voivodes" were guilty of committing. Sirko established contacts with Cossack rebel leaders, particularly with Petro Doroshenko and advocated for Cossack rights. Evidence suggests that Ivan Sirko could’ve been among instigators of the uprising and planned it during late 1667.

== Campaign ==
On March 4, 1668, Sirko launched a series of revolts in Merefa, Tsareborisov, Mayatsk, Valki, Chervonyi Kut and Torsk salt lakes. On March 11, Sirko headed to Kharkiv with the goal of capturing it. Kharkiv governor Lev Sytin was concerned about Sirko’s activities and informed Prince Grigory Romodanovsky about this, with same sentiment being expressed by Chuhuiv governor. Romodanovsky reassured Chuhuiv governor that Kharkiv population remained loyal and he should maintain contact with Sytin, while also taking punitive actions on traitors from Cherkasy. Sirko abandoned his plan to capture Kharkiv due to lack of local support. Kharkiv part of Sloboda Ukraine including Tsareborisov, Mayatskaya, Zmiev, Valki and Murafa took Sirko's side. The rest of the large settlements remained loyal to the tsar. However, Sirko still achieved a level of success in Kharkiv, with the killing of Tsarist Kharkiv colonel Fyodor Repka. Sirko was nevertheless forced to retreat to Poltava, which had been previously captured (on February 5), because Romodanovsky himself was preparing to act against him.

After his campaign in Sloboda, Sirko headed to Dnieper Ukraine. Sirko defeated Russian troops near Okhtyrka and Poltava. On April, Sirko captured the Borove settlement. On May, Sirko captured the Kolontaiv and Martova settlements. After his campaign, Sirko went across the Dnieper to meet with Doroshenko in Chyhyryn. Sirko's entire campaign was aimed at propagandizing Bryukhovetsky, in order to expel the Russians from the region, this propaganda was not successful.

== Aftermath ==
Sirko managed to achieve local success near Kharkiv, Okhtyrka and Poltava. However, his attempts to move the uprising to really large centers ended in failure. Ivan Bryukhovetsky attempted to capitalize on Sirko’s military success, trying to get more colonels to his side, saying that Ivan Sirko went over to his side and already driven out Russian troops from "many Ukrainian Slobozhan cities". Sirko's incomplete success was temporary, as he did not take Kharkiv, and the Russians regained control of the region. Later, disagreements began in the Cossack camp, due to the fact that Sirko refused to support the Tatars. Sirko eventually abandoned his role as a rebel leader and returned to the Sich, as it became clear he won't be able to gather large enough forces.
