= Siege of Chyhyryn =

- Part of The Ruin
Date	December 1668 – January 1669
Location	Chyhyryn, Right-Bank Ukraine
Result	Doroshenko-Sirko victory

Belligerents
Doroshenko's Cossacks; Sirko's Cossacks	Sukhovy's Cossacks; Crimean Khanate

Commanders and leaders
Petro Doroshenko; Ivan Sirko; Hnat Ulanovsky	Petro Sukhovy; Krim Giray; Murza Batyrcha (WIA)

Strength
Unknown	Unknown

Casualties and losses
Unknown	Entire force defected 4,000+ killed

The siege of Chyhyryn was conducted by Sukhovy with his Crimean Tatar allies to consolidate power over Right-Bank Ukraine and take over Left-Bank against his rival Doroshenko who was supported by Ivan Sirko, from December 1668 to January 1669.

== Prelude ==
Petro Sukhovy rose to power with the support of his Tatar allies in the Right-Bank and declared himself as Hetman. Doroshenko sent Sirko to 4 campaigns into Crimea with the goal of weakening Sukhovy's allies. After Sirko caused great damage and killed many Tatars in his campaigns, killing 3,000 and capturing 500 Tatars in his third campaign, threatening and damaging Bakhchysarai during his fourth campaign. Doroshenko wanted to make peace with Tatars in exchange for handing over traitor Sukhovy, Tatars were only willing agree in exchange for handing over Sirko, but it was not possible to achieve peace on these conditions.

== Siege ==
On December, 1668, Sukhovy and his Tatar allies besieged Chyhyryn, where Doroshenko was holding defense. In January 1669, Krim-Giray left part of Tatar army led by Murza Batyrcha outside of Chyhyryn and departed to Crimea. Sirko didn't go to Crimea this time and acted together with Doroshenko. Sukhovy and Batyrcha retreated to the town of Olkhovets, where they suffered a crushing defeat to Ivan Sirko and Colonel Ulanovsky. Sukhovy fled with 5–15 of his men, while the remaining Tatars fled to Crimea.

== Aftermath ==
4,000 Tatars were killed in battle with Ivan Sirko and Colonel Ulanovsky. Sukhovy's Cossacks defected to Sirko's side. This defeat undermined Sukhovy's position and he later lost his position as Hetman the same year, with pro-Polish Mykhailo Khanenko rising to prominence in the Right-Bank.
