= Sirko's campaigns =

1654–1679 Cossack attacks on the Ottomans, Crimea, and Nogai

- Part of the Ruin, Cossack raids, Crimean–Nogai slave raids in Eastern Europe and Ottoman wars in Europe
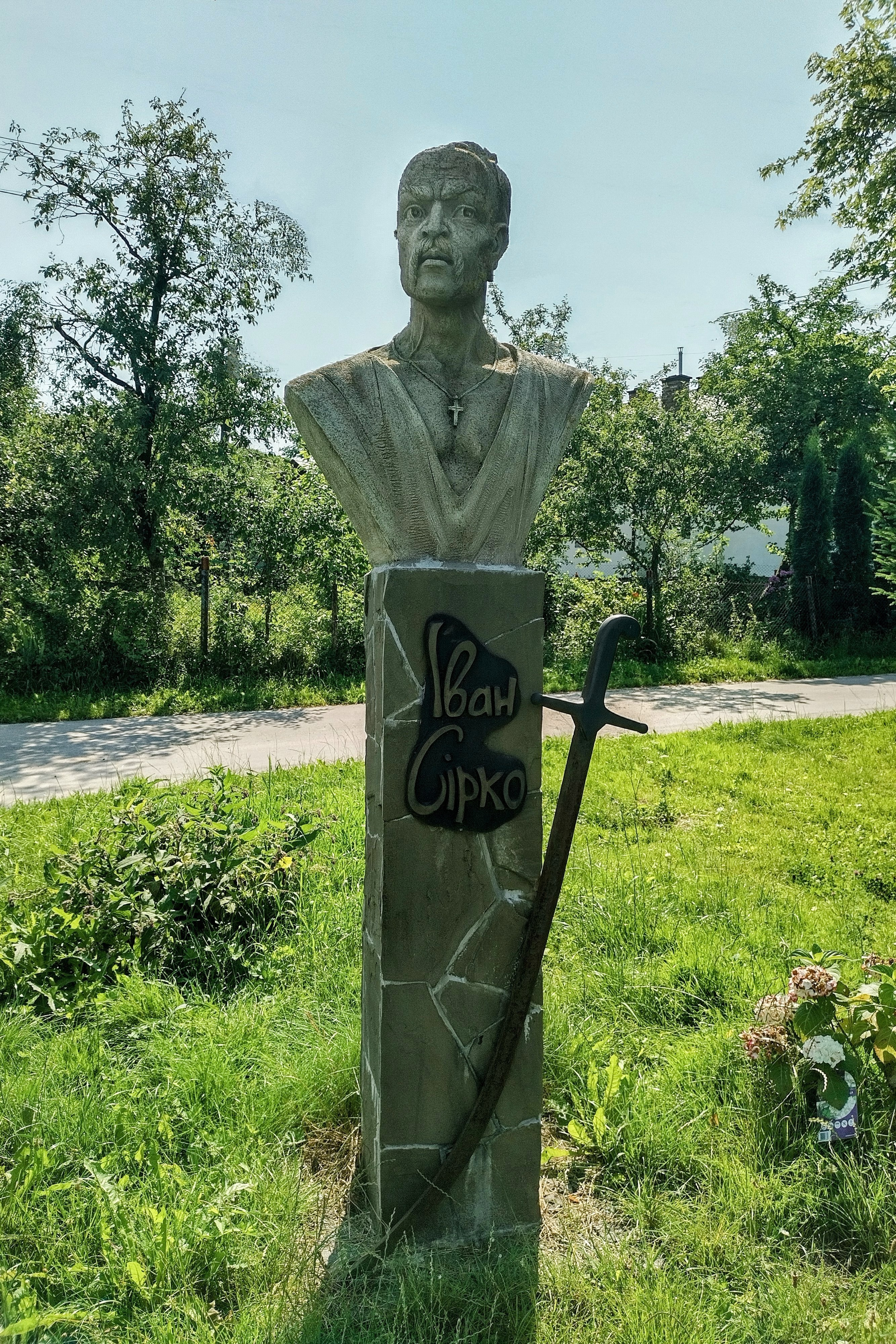
- Monument to Ivan Sirko in Sokilnyky
Date	1654–1679
Location	Crimea, Budjak, Danube, lower Dnieper

Belligerents
Zaporozhian Cossacks; Don Cossacks; Kalmyk Khanate; Circassians	Crimean Khanate; Nogai Horde; Ottoman Empire

Commanders and leaders
Ivan Sirko; Ivan Zhdan-Rih; Mykhailo Khanenko; Colonel Ulanovsky; Stenka Razin; Frol Minaev; Mazan Batyr; Erke Aturkay (Tsardom of Russia) Kasbulat the Brave	Mehmed IV Giray; Adil Giray; Selim I Giray; Murad Giray; Karach Bey †; Murza Tenmambet (POW) (Ottoman Empire) Mehmed IV (Ottoman Empire) Kara Mustafa Pasha (Ottoman Empire) Kara-Muhammad

Strength
12,000–20,000	Variable

Sirko's campaigns were a series of raids and military actions carried out by Cossack leader Ivan Sirko during his fight against Crimean Khanate, Nogai Horde and Ottoman Empire, in 1654–1679.

== Background ==
Beginning in the late 15th century, Zaporozhian Cossacks carried out raids against the Crimean Khanate in response to Crimean-Nogai slave raids in Eastern Europe. Around this time, Cossacks began to found city-fortresses which were called Siches. For example, the Tomakivka Sich was burnt down in 1593 during a Tatar attack. In Sirko's time, the most notable Sich was the Chortomlyk Sich (1652–1709), which repelled Tatar attacks and even Ottoman campaigns.

Cossacks frequently carried out sea raids on the Ottoman Empire starting from the 1550s. The Zaporozhian Cossacks only ceased their sea raids in 1648 due to Khmelnytsky's revolt (which began at the Mykytyn Sich) and the emergence of the Cossack Hetmanate. Thereafter, only the Don Cossacks went sea raiding. The Crimean Khanate was initially an ally of the new Cossack state against the Commonwealth; however, this began to change in December 1653, at the end of Siege of Zhvanets, when the Khanate and Commonwealth established a truce and later an alliance (until 1666). Crimean Tatars took locals as captives in Podolia, forcing Cossack leader Ivan Sirko to clash with Tatar troops.

In 1654, Bohdan Khmelnytsky conducted the Pereiaslav Rada, discussing a possibility of swearing an oath to the tsar in exchange for military protection. Despite protests from some Cossack colonels, including Ivan Sirko, Khmelnytsky signed the agreement. This led to conflict between Hetman Khmelnytsky and disgruntled Cossack colonels. As a result, Sirko departed to the Zaporozhian Sich.

== Warfare ==
The geopolitical environment of Zaporozhian Sich was different from other parts of Ukraine. It was surrounded by the Crimean Khanate and Ottoman Empire. Sich needed to ensure it had secure passages and mobile movement. Zaporozhians had an active navy and a permanent fighting force of 12,000–20,000 Cossacks during 1657–1687.

In 1654, with the arrival of Ivan Sirko to the Sich, the raiding activity of Cossacks against Crimean and Ottoman lands saw a sharp rise. Zaporozhians saw Ottomans as a massive threat, which sought to destroy them.

=== Sirko's activity ===
Ivan Sirko came out victorious in numerous battles, but also suffered some losses. Sirko waged a relentless war against the Khanate and Ottoman Empire, as their activity in Ukrainian lands remained largely unchecked during the period of Zaporozhian inactivity in northern Black Sea region.

Sirko's raids and campaigns targeted all sorts of areas. From Crimean Perekop to Ottoman Ochakiv and Tighina. In some cases, Sirko went on campaigns with very small forces. One such instance took place during his campaign on Perekop during December 1663, where his 180-strong unit defeated 1,000-strong Crimean Tatar army of Karach Bey. Karach Bey fell in this battle, so did his associates and nearly all Tatar troops. With such military skills, Sirko was respected by Cossacks and played an important role during their campaigns. Sich Cossacks elected Sirko as their Kish otaman 8 times throughout his career. Sirko was also the first Kish otaman to carry out joint campaigns Kalmyks, among whom Sirko also enjoyed great respect.

== Sirko’s Ottoman campaigns ==
=== Crimean blockade ===
In 1655, Bohdan Khmelnytsky instructed Ivan Sirko to blockade Kerch Strait and Taman Peninsula, effectively blockading Crimea and limiting Tatar military movement. This was intended to halt a planned Crimean Tatar invasion of southern Ukrainian lands. It was also in the interest of Russian Tsardom to support Cossacks in their raiding activity, in order to counter Tatar raids while they had their main forces in the west during the war with Poland–Lithuania, with inability to mount a significant garrison force in the south.

Cossacks used boats to reach Eastern Crimea. They encountered and fought Tatars, even elite Ottoman Sipahi cavalry. Overall, the campaign succeeded. During the campaign, Zaporozhian and Don Cossacks terrorized the whole of Crimea for two months after capturing Taman Peninsula.

=== Anti-Vyhovsky campaign ===
Initially, Sirko was an opponent of Russia. In 1659, he reconsidered his position, officially siding with Russian Tsardom. Ivan Vyhovsky became Cossack Hetman, pursuing a pro-Polish policy and decisively defeating Russian army at Konotop with his Tatar allies. However, Cossack colonels Ivan Bohun and Sirko chose a pro-Russian position, with the former launching an uprising to overthrow pro-Polish Hetman who wanted to break Russian-Ukrainian union.

Sirko used his skills in fighting Tatars in order to aid Bohun in his uprising, disrupting activities of Vyhovsky's allies. On 28 August, news came about Sirko making daring raids on Tatar Nogai uluses and Ottoman Akkerman fortress. Sirko killed many Tatars and Turks there, captured two Tatar murzas and freed many Lithuanian captives taken by Tatars. Vyhovsky was alerted by this news and sent out Cossacks led by colonel Tymosh, in order to prevent Sirko from coming to Kyiv. However, Sirko predicted Tymosh intentions and inflicted a crushing defeat on pro-Polish Cossacks. After this, Sirko looted Vyhovsky's treasury and captured Chyhyryn. In addition, he cleared the Ukrainian territories of remaining Tatar units that could still pose a threat.

=== Ochakov-Aslan campaign ===
In 1660, Khan Mehmed IV Giray made a deal with King Casimir about sending 80,000-strong Tatar army in a joint campaign against the Cossack Hetmanate and Tsardom of Russia. These troops arrived to Ochakov, which was under Ottoman control. Sultan Mehmed IV feared Cossack raids, so he ordered an army to occupy Arslan-Kermen city, to block access through the Dnieper.

Sirko organised a joint campaign with Don Cossacks, leading 5,000 of his "Hunter" Cossacks, which were specialized in these operations. Sirko headed in the direction of Ochakov, other Cossacks headed for Aslan-Kermen. After this, Cossacks attacked at once and took the Turkish-Tatar forces by surprise. Cossacks returned from the campaign with loot and many captives. Khan's army remained in Ochakiv and Budjak without making any serious campaigns for five months, which begun to infuriate him with his Polish allies.

=== Crimean campaign of 1667 ===
In 1667, large portion of Crimean Tatar army was busy helping Doroshenko in his war with Poland–Lithuania. For the Sich Cossacks, this was a perfect opportunity to plunder Crimea. Sirko promised that they will get back what was "stolen from our own people" and will take revenge for the damage caused by Tatar raids.

Cossacks utterly devastated Crimea, with Arbautuk and Kaffa suffering the most. Cossacks reportedly left "nothing but cats and dogs" in Crimea. This campaign also helped John III Sobieski during Battle of Podhajce, since Tatars abandoned Doroshenko and headed to Crimea after receiving the news of Cossacks plundering it. Tsar Alexis sent a commendation letter to Sirko for his victory over Tatars, given to him by captain Vasyl Sukhorukov.

=== Crimean campaign of 1668 ===
In 1668, Sirko carried out three successful campaigns on Crimea. Ivan Sirko left the Sich for a while and appeared in Sloboda Ukraine. The Cossacks elected him as colonel of the Zmiev Regiment. In October-November of the same year, together with the Kosh ataman Ivan Zhdan-Rog, he led a Cossack army on a campaign against the Crimean Khanate the Cossacks defeated the Tatar horde near Kafa (Theodosia), freeing 2,000 prisoners, and threatened the khan's capital, Bakhchisarai.

=== Siege of Ochakov ===
On 20 June 1670, Sirko besieged and subsequently sacked Ochakov. Sirko was dissatisfied with Ottoman control in this region, and wanted to undermine it. Sirko also wanted to prove his loyalty to the Russian Tsar this way.

Sirko wanted to demonstrate with this campaign to Istanbul and Bakhchysarai that they're not welcome on "ancient Ukrainian lands". Sirko later informed Russian authorities of his success. Sirko then used the opportunity to request assistance from the Russian Tsardom.

=== Eastern campaign ===
Sirko intensified his activities during 1672–1674. In May 1673, Sirko conducted a series of raids on Ottoman fortresses, Budjak and Crimean Tatar lands. Sirko's Cossacks devastated Ochakiv, Islam-Kermen, Tighina, Izmail and Sokol outskirts. When Sirko launched an attack on Crimea, it was going through a pandemic, therefore Tatars were incapable of putting up a serious resistance. Sirko reached as far as Bakhchysarai and forces Khan Selim I Giray to flee into the Crimean mountains.

Sirko's raiding activity in 1673 created favourable conditions for John III Sobieski before Battle of Khotyn, where Polish-Lithuanian forces scored a major victory against Ottoman army.

=== Crimean campaign 1675 ===
In September 1675, Sirko's Cossacks with his allies managed to sneak into Crimea. As a result, they took Tatars by surprise and begun to devastate entirety of Crimea. The campaign was so successful that Cossacks even reached and captured Bakhchysarai.

Khan Selim I Giray fled to the mountains, but managed to reorganise his army and intended to block Cossack-led forces at Perekop. However, Khan's army was outmaneuvered by Sirko and his army suffered a crushing defeat.

=== Chyhyryn campaign 1678 ===
Despite the Ottoman failure in 1677, they renewed their offensive on the Chyhyryn fortress in 1678. The Ottomans this time managed to gain the upper hand and push out Cossack-Russian garrison. Samoylovych desperately asked Ivan Sirko to halt a seemingly unstoppable Ottoman-Crimean army.

Sirko operated on Ottoman territory, burning 50 Ottoman ships carrying supplies, sabotaging communication and transport. As a result, Sirko's actions allowed Cossack-Russian army near Chyhyryn to overcome the Ottoman-led forces. Sirko's raids eventually forced the Ottoman-Crimean army to abandon Chyhyryn.

=== Crimean campaign 1679 ===
In 1679, Ivan Sirko set off to "scare entirety of Crimea" where he forced Khan Murad Giray to flee into the Crimean mountains. The campaign was highly successful, liberating many captives and devastating Tatar settlements.

Same year, after a series of defeats suffered by the Ottoman-Crimean forces against Zaporozhian Cossacks, Sirko and his Cossacks sent a reply to Crimean Khan:

Do not bother to attack us again. This time, you are not coming to us, we are coming to you. We captured Trabzon and Sinop, we turned the Asian coast upside down; we cauterized the flanks of Belgrade, we wiped out Varna, Izmail and many Danube fortresses from the map. As the heirs of the old Zaporizhians, we follow their footsteps. We do not want to argue with you, if we see your provocations again, we will not hesitate to come again.

== Ottoman-Crimean response ==
=== Battle of Sich 1674 ===
In 1674, Sultan Mehmed IV and Khan Selim I Giray planned a campaign into the Sich to destroy it, in order to end the frequent Cossack raids of Ivan Sirko into their lands. 15,000 Ottoman Janissaries and 40,000 Crimean Tatars were sent for this campaign.

The Ottoman-Crimean forces attempted to sneak in at night, but they were detected and suffered heavy losses in process. Sirko responded to this attack by attacking Crimea in 1675.

=== Stand on the Sich 1679 ===
In August, 1679, the 25,000-strong Ottoman-Crimean army intended to attack Sich again, in response to his raids on Ottoman fortresses. Sirko's sabotage actions during the Chyhyryn campaign in 1678 also contributed to this.

Sirko organised a defense, with Russian army coming to his assistance. As a result, Ottoman-Crimean army was deterred and retreated.

== Impact ==
=== Crimean Khanate ===
In late 1660s and early 1670s, Evliya Çelebi explored Crimea, noting significant depopulation of many Crimean settlements, which he attributed to Cossack raiding. Sirko became infamous among Tatars. Polish chronicler Wespazjan Kochowski reported that "...Tatars quite seriously considered him [Sirko] a shaitan [Devil]..."

Sirko during his career exhausted the Crimean treasury, which they inherited from Batu Khan, looted from Russian lands. During the career of Semyon Paliy, who was compared to Sirko, Crimean Tatars were forced to hand over remnants of their treasure inherited from Genghis Khan, in order to ransom their Khans.

=== Ottoman Empire ===
Sirko's campaigns on numerous occasions helped Poland–Lithuania and Tsardom of Russia in their wars with the Ottoman Empire. The losses inflicted on the Ottoman army made them turn away their view from Ukrainian lands, with Ottomans abandoning any large-scale campaigns there for the coming decades.

Sirko's conflict with the Ottoman Empire created a basis for the most popular painting in Ukrainian-Russian history, Ilya Repin's Reply of the Zaporozhian Cossacks. In 1675, Ottoman Sultan reportedly sent a letter where he asked Zaporozhian Cossacks to submit to the Ottoman rule. In response, Sirko's Cossacks sent a reply full of profanities and insults.

=== Europe ===
Ivan Sirko became famous all over Europe for his exploits. Ataman Sirko was compared to Sviatoslav I and Hannibal. Other comparisons included to being like a guardian dog, placed by God to protect Christians. Certain poets compared Sirko to heroic Maltese knights, wondering: "why a simple Cossack, not a king or prince, experienced such glory." John III Sobieski described Sirko as "glorious warrior and a great artist in military affairs".

Author of History of Ruthenians gave the following impression of Sirko:

Sirko was an amazing man of rare qualities in the discussion of courage, enterprise and all military successes, and, with a sufficient number of troops, he could easily become Tamerlane or Genghis Khan, that is, a great conqueror.

According to Ivan Krypiakevych (1886–1967), Ivan Sirko's campaigns played a crucial role in weakening the Crimean Khanate, forcing the Tatars to retreat from areas of the Pontic–Caspian steppe and paved a way for settlers from Ukraine, spreading Ukrainian culture in the Wild Fields.

== Bibliography ==
- Sobchenko, Ivan (2020). Kosh Otaman of Zaporozhian Sich I.D. Sirko (in Russian). Moscow: Ваш формат.
- Paly, Alexander (2017). Історія України (in Ukrainian). Vol. 3. Kyiv: К.І.С. ISBN 978-617-684-166-1.
- Коляда, І.А. (2012). Отаман Сірко (in Ukrainian). Folio. ISBN 978-966-03-5804-1.
- Davies, Brian (2007). Warfare, State and Society on the Black Sea Steppe, 1500-1700. Routledge. ISBN 978-0415239868.
- Seaton, Albert (1996). The Horsemen of the Steppes. Barnes & Noble Books. ISBN 0760700834.
- Roşu, Felicia (2021). Slavery In The Black Sea Region, C. 900– 1900. Chapter 8 (Maryna Kravets & Victor Ostapchuk). Brill. ISBN 978-9004470712.
- King, Charles (2005). The Black Sea: A History (1 ed.). Oxford University Press, USA. ISBN 019928394X.
- Şirokorad, A. B. (2009). Osmanli - Rus Savaslari (in Turkish). Selenge. ISBN 9789758839636.
- Крип'якевич, Іван (1992). Історія українського війська (in Ukrainian). Lviv: Світ. ISBN 5-7773-0148-7.
- Yavornytskyi, Dmytro (2004). Tvory. Vol. 1. Tandem-U. ISBN 966-7482-31-6.
- Kostomarov, N. (1997). Ruina. Moscow Charli. ISBN 586859018X.
- Smoliy, V. (1994). Володарі гетьманської булави: Іст. портрети. Kyiv: Варта. ISBN 5-203-01639-9.
- Mytsyk; Plokhiy; Storozhenko, Mytsyk Y. A.; S. M.; I. S (1990). How the Cossacks Fought (in Ukrainian). Дніпропетровськ: Промінь. ISBN 5-7775-0334-9.
- Penn, William (1919). The Cossacks;. Palala Press. ISBN 1355521025.
- Doroshenko, Dmytro (1939). History of the Ukraine. A. Vansovich.
- Апанович, О. М. (1961). Запорізька Січ у боротьбі проти турецько-татарської агресії (in Ukrainian). Київ: Вид-во АН УРСР.
