= Battle of Kalmius =

1585 Cossack–Tatar confrontation

- Part of the Cossack raids and Crimean-Nogai slave raids in Eastern Europe
Date	1585
Location	Kalmius, Crimean Khanate (modern-day Mariupol, Donetsk Oblast)
Result	Cossack victory
Territorial changes	Zaporozhian Sich annexes Kalmius and Berda

Belligerents
Zaporozhian Cossacks	Crimean Khanate; Nogai Horde

Commanders and leaders
Mykhailo Ruzhynsky; Jan Orishevsky	İslâm II Giray

Strength
Unknown	Unknown

Casualties and losses
Unknown	3,000+ killed Heavy

The Battle of Kalmius (Note: Ukrainian: Битва на Кальміусі Crimean Tatar: Kalmius Qaraşı Nogai: Kalmius savaşï) was a confrontation between the Zaporozhian Cossacks and Crimean-Nogai Tatars over control of territory in modern-day Donetsk Oblast, in 1585.

== Prelude ==
In 1585, Mykhailo Ruzhynsky was elected as the Hetman of Zaporizhian Cossacks. Newly-elected Hetman distinguished himself in a raid on Perekop where Cossacks seized lots of loot from Tatars. Crimean Khan İslâm II Giray complained about this to the Polish King Stephen Báthory, threatening the King with invasion. The King sent envoy Głębowski to demand for Cossacks to return looted property to the Khan, but Cossacks refused and drowned the royal envoy. The same year, İslâm II Giray launched a large-scale raid on Ukrainian lands.

During the same year, Crimean Khans were going through a power a struggle. Saadet II Giray attempted to take power, but was defeated by İslâm II Giray who was supported by the Ottoman Empire. However, the Cossacks would later take advantage of the weakness this power struggle caused for the Crimean Khanate.

== Battle ==
The Crimean Khan intended to invade Ukrainian lands by crossing the sea near Tavan island, leading his Tatar cavalry. However, they were met by Cossack boats which engaged Tatar in a battle on the sea. The Cossacks came out victorious, killing 3,000 Crimean Tatars and capturing their boats. As a result, the Tatar invasion of Ukrainian lands was repelled.

After Cossack victory on the sea, Cossack Hetman Ruzhynsky launched a counteroffensive into the Crimean Tatar territory. Cossacks defeated the Crimean-Nogai troops that were stationed at Kalmius and Berda, capturing these fortresses.

== Aftermath ==
The Cossack triumph at Kalmius over Crimeans and Nogais had a strategic impact that weakened the Tatars. Cossacks seized 40,000 horses which weakened Tatar cavalry capabilities. Kalmius and Berda were captured by the Cossacks. It was seen as "reclamation of former Kievan Rus' territory". These places were turned into settlements with Cossack garrisons set up there to prevent Tatar detachments from freely passing through.

== See also ==
- Siege of Cherkasy
- Crimean campaign (1575)
- Crimean campaign (1589)
