= Battle of Varna (1606) =

- Part of Cossack raids and the Cossack naval campaigns
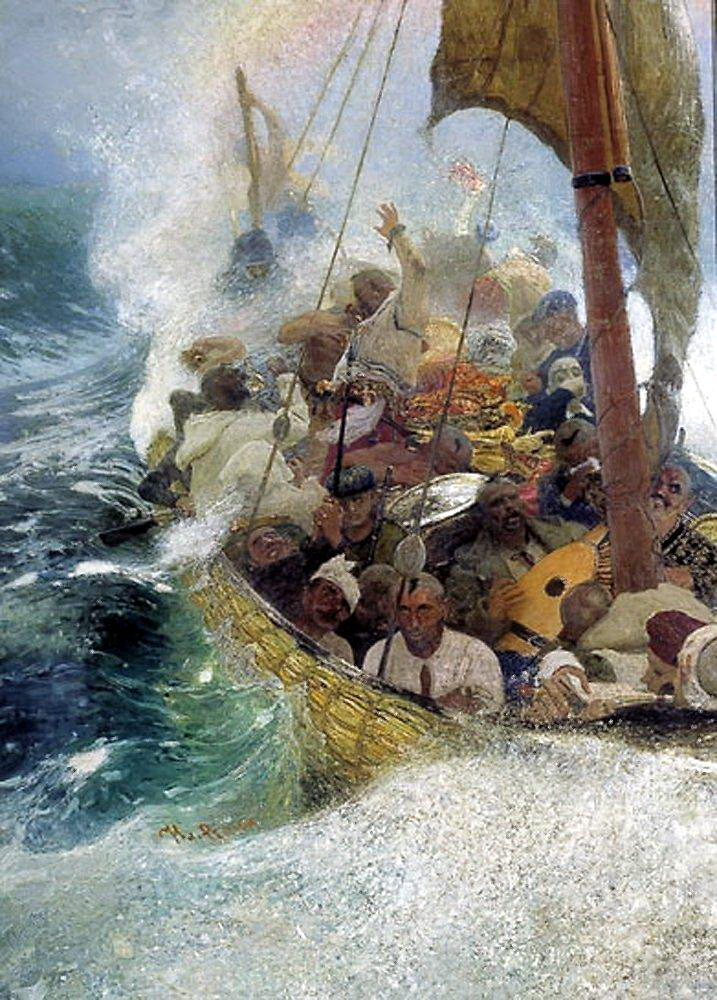
- Cossacks on the Black Sea. Painting by Ilya Repin
Date	Summer of 1606
Location	Varna, Rumelia Eyalet, Ottoman Empire (present-day Bulgaria)
Result	Cossack victory

Belligerents
Zaporozhian Cossacks	Ottoman Empire

Commanders and leaders
Hryhoriy Izapovych; Petro Sahaidachny	(Ottoman Empire) Local garrison commander † (Ottoman Empire) Ali-Pasha (blocking at Ochakov)

Strength
Unknown	Unknown

Casualties and losses
Unknown	Heavy; 10 galleys captured
- Large civilian casualties Lots of captives freed

The Battle of Varna (Note: Ukrainian: Битва під Варною Turkish: Varna Muharebesi Bulgarian: Битка за Варна) was a major battle over the fortress of Varna on the Black Sea between the Zaporozhian Cossacks led by Hryhoriy Izapovych and the Ottoman garrison of the city as a part of the Cossack naval campaigns. The Cossacks unexpectedly attacked Varna from the sea and captured it with a series of assaults.

== Background ==
The Zaporozhian Cossacks, who had recently emerged as a separate community were often going on a raids against the Ottoman empire and it's vassals, especially the Crimean Khanate. The raids had intensified during Sahaidachny's era – in 1602, the Cossacks on 30 chaikas defeated the Ottoman fleet near Kiliia and in 1604 the Cossacks attacked Varna for the first time. In 1605, Cossack hetman Izapovych defeated the Tatar raiders at Dniester river.

== Battle ==
In the summer of 1606, the Cossacks under the command of hetman Hryhoriy Izapovych launched a major raid on the Black sea, attacked the fortresses of Kiliia and Akkerman and approached Varna. In the night, some of the Cossacks bypassed the fortress by moving upstream along the river. The raiders attacked Varna both from the sea and the land, firing at the fortress from cannons. A battle took place, which turned out to be a Cossack victory – the fortress was destroyed, although not captured due to strong resistance and the galleys stationed in the city were either destroyed or captured. The Ottomans tried to block the way for Cossacks that were returning from a successful campaign in Varna but were caught up by the Cossacks near Ochakov and defeated with heavy casualties and only Ali-Pasha being able to escape.

== Aftermath ==
The looters destroyed the Varna fortress and captured a prey with a total cost of 180 thousand złotys. In 1606, following the return to Ukraine, Izapovych warned the population of Dnieper Ukraine about the large upcoming Tatar invasion. In the next year, Cossacks led by Petro Konashevych raided Ochakov and Perekop and in 1608 they attacked the Danube Delta. This expedition became the first major Cossack expedition where Sahaidachny is being mentioned.

== Legacy ==
A Ukrainian folk song was dedicated to this campaign:

Була Варна здавна славна.

Славнішії козаченьки.

Що тої Варни дістали

І в ній турків забрали.

== See also ==
- Raid on Varna
