= Raid on Tiahynka =

- Part of the Cossack raids and Cossack naval campaigns
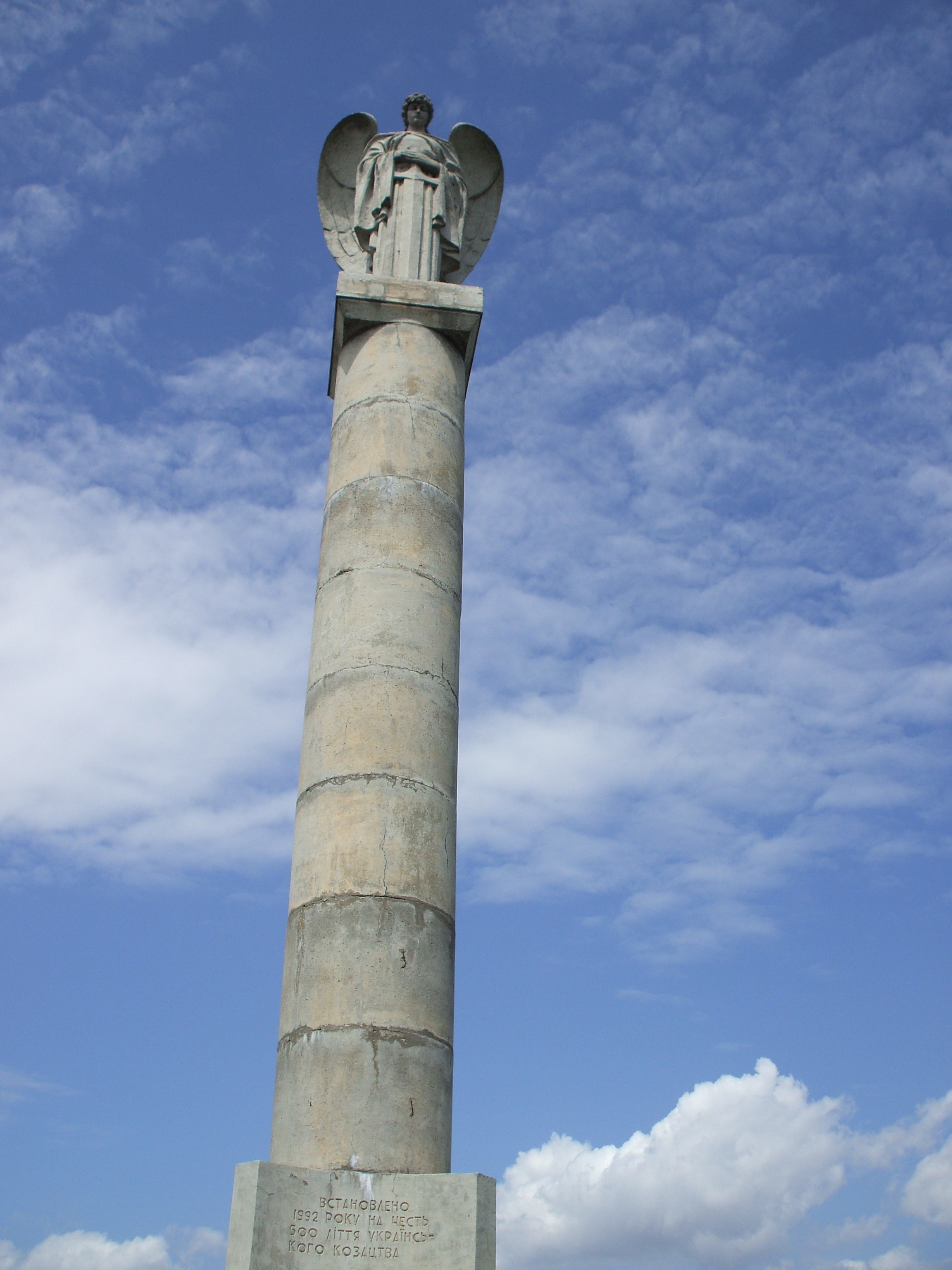
- Monument to the first battle of Zaporozhian Cossacks
Date	1 August 1492
Location	Near Tiahynka, Ottoman Empire (now Ukraine)
Result	Cossack victory

Belligerents
Zaporozhian Cossacks	Ottoman Empire; Crimean Khanate

Commanders and leaders
Bohdan Glynsky	Unknown

Strength
Unknown	Unknown

Casualties and losses
None	5 captured 1 ship captured
- Lots of captives freed

The Raid on Tiahynka (Note: Ukrainian: Похід на Тягинку Turkish: Tiahynkaya Baskı Crimean Tatar: Tiahynka Basqını) was a naval engagement that took place in August 1492 between the fleet of the Ottoman Empire and the Zaporozhian Cossacks led by Bohdan Glynsky near the fortress of Tiahyn (now the village of Tiahynka, Ukraine) and ended in a Cossack success.

== Background ==
In 1491, the lands where the Tiahyn castle is located were reconquered by the Crimean Khanate, and the fortress was rebuilt by the Crimean khan Meñli I Giray, and it became one of the outposts from which the Tatars raided Ruthenian lands.

== Raid ==
On 1 August 1492, the Zaporozhian Cossacks led by Bohdan Glynsky set off for a campaign into the Dnieper from Kaniv and Cherkasy. Near Tiagin (Tiahynka) they attacked an Ottoman-Tatar ship. A battle took place, as a result of which, the Cossacks captured the ship and its commander, and his property was confiscated and the slaves on the ship were freed from captivity, then they captured another man and his oxen. Jagiellon's reply to Mengli Giray also mentions that after the attack on the Tatar ship, the Cossacks captured three more people and over a dozen horses in Tiagyn. After a successful attack, Glynsky's Cossacks returned to Ukraine.

== Aftermath ==
Following the attack, Khan Mengli I Geray sent a complaint to the Grand Duke of Lithuania Alexander Jagiellon about the "Circassian actions against the Crimean fleet". On 19 December, Alexander sent a reply letter to him, where he explained that the attack was carried without his knowledge. Next year, as a revenge for the Tatar raid on Cherkasy, Glynsky attacked and destroyed the fortress in Ochakov. This battle is considered to be the first recorded campaign of the Zaporozhian Cossacks. (Note: Another campaign that is sometimes named a "Cossack raid", was an attack on the Muscovite convoy near Tavan in 1489 by people of Jerzy Pac, however the perpetrators were not directly named "Cossacks")

== Legacy ==
In 1992, a monument commemorating the first Cossack battle against the Ottoman Empire was installed in the village.
