= Sirko's Eastern campaign =

The Sirko's Eastern Campaign were a series of raids carried out by the Zaporozhian Cossacks led by Ivan Sirko against the Crimean Khanate, Nogai Horde and Ottoman Empire that took place in May 1673. Part of the Ottoman-Cossack Conflict.

== Prelude ==
Tatars were returning from Kamenets-Podolsky to Crimea while passing through the lands of Zaporozhian Cossacks, they stole their cattle and abducted several people in process. Ivan Sirko found out about this and wanted to take revenge on Tatars for their crimes against Rus' people. He organised a punitive campaign against Crimean Khanate, Nogai Horde and Ottoman Empire.

== Campaign ==
Raids on Northern Ottoman Empire
- Part of the Cossack raids
Date	May 1673
Location	Northern Ottoman Empire
Result	Cossack victory
Territorial changes	Devastation of Northern Ottoman lands

Belligerents
Sirko's Cossacks	Ottoman Empire

Commanders and leaders
Ivan Sirko	Unknown

Raids on Crimea and Budjak
- Part of the Cossack raids
Date	May 1673
Location	Crimea and Budjak
Result	Cossack-Kalmyk victory
Territorial changes	Devastation of Bakhchysarai and Crimean-Nogai lands

Belligerents
Sirko's Cossacks; Kalmyk Khanate	Crimean Khanate; Nogai Horde

Commanders and leaders
Ivan Sirko	Selim I Giray

Strength
Unknown	Unknown

Casualties and losses
Unknown	Many captured

=== Budjak ===
Nogai Tatars often took part in raids on Eastern Europe together with Crimean Tatars. Sirko went to the lands of Nogai Horde, specifically Budjak at the start of his campaign, devastating them before heading with Cossacks to Aq Kirmān.

=== Aq Kirmān ===
Aq Kirmān (Bilhorod-Dnistrovskyi) was under control of the Ottomans. Ivan Sirko besieged this city then captured and looted it. From there, he ordered part of his army to prepare to land on the shores of Karasubazar while he headed to Perekop with his land army. Sirko also plundered Ochakiv, Islam-Kermen, Tighina, Izmail and Sokol outskirts.

=== Crimea ===
Khan Selim I Giray was ill and the population of Crimea was struck by a pandemic. Ivan Sirko took advantage of their vulnerability and captured Perekop with his land army, combined with element of surprise from the Cossack ships that landed on the shores of Karasubazar. Cossacks devastated the coastal cities, while Tatars were unprepared for the attack and couldn't put up a sufficient resistance. Having passed through the entirety of Crimea, Ivan Sirko joined with the rest of his army at Perekop and looted Tatar villages on the way out. This way, Otaman Sirko was taking revenge on Tatars for their crimes in a "hundredfold manner".

During the campaign into Crimea, Sirko took Khan by complete surprise and drove him out of his own capital, Bakhchysarai to the mountains and freed several thousand captives, also taking many Tatar captives with him in process. However, Ataman Ivan Sirko lost his son named Roman during this campaign, which further infuriated Ivan Sirko and led to intensification of raids on the Crimean Tatars in the future.

== Aftermath ==
This campaign weakened Crimean Khanate, Nogai Horde and Ottoman Empire. This created favorable conditions for Poland-Lithuania before attack on Khotyn. This potentially inspired the Ottoman-Crimean campaign on Sich in winter 1674, with the goal of ending Cossack campaigns and raids on their territories.

== Bibliography ==
- Коляда, І.А. (2012). Отаман Сірко (in Ukrainian). Folio. ISBN 978-966-03-5804-1.
