= Cossack raid on North Anatolia =

Cossack raid on North Anatolia (1616)
- Part of the Cossack raids and Cossack naval campaigns
Date	Autumn 1616
Location	Northern Anatolia, Ottoman Empire
Result	Cossack victory
Territorial changes	Devastation of Istanbul and major cities

Belligerents
Zaporozhian Cossacks	Ottoman Empire

Commanders and leaders
Petro Konashevych-Sahaidachny	(Ottoman Empire) Chikala Pasha (Ottoman Empire) Ibrahim Pasha †

Strength
2,000	Unknown

Casualties and losses
Unknown	Istanbul, per Ottomans: 5,000–6,000 killed Many captured Naval losses: 26 galleys sunk; 15 galleys captured; 3 large ships sunk; Several small ships sunk

The Cossack raid on Northern Anatolia (Note: Turkish: Kuzey Anadolu'ya Kazak Baskını Ukrainian: Козацький напад на Північну Анатолію) was a large-scale attack led by Cossack leader Petro Konashevych-Sahaidachny against major Ottoman cities on the shores of north Anatolia, which took place in the autumn of 1616.

== Prelude ==
In 1615, the Zaporozhian Cossacks of Petro Konashevych-Sahaidachny led a raid on Istanbul. This raid was so successful that Sultan Ahmed I could see the smoke outside his residence. In 1616, Cossacks began to conduct such raids on a larger scale. On 22 July 1616, Cossacks of Sahaidachny successfully plundered Kaffa. In the autumn of 1616, Sahaidachny now intended to lead his Cossacks in a campaign to plunder Trebizond, Sinop, and Istanbul on the northern shore of Anatolia. Sahaidachny commanded 2,000 Cossacks in a raid on Anatolia.

== Raids in northern Anatolia ==
Polish King Sigismund III and Sultan Ahmed I made a truce. Cossacks were officially Polish-Lithuanian subjects, but they refused to obey by the treaty, beginning with their raid on Trebizond as their first target. Cossacks crossed the Black Sea to reach northern Anatolia. Before reaching Anatolian shore, Cossacks fought a battle with Ottoman fleet in the Dnieper, which they won and captured 15 galleys. As the sea raid of the Zaporozhian Cossacks began, Sahaidachny first burnt 26 Ottoman galleys near Minera. Then, Cossacks landed on the shore of northern Anatolia, where they attacked, captured and plundered Trebizond, taking the Ottoman forces by surprise.

As the presence of Cossacks became known, Sultan ordered Chikala Pasha's Ottoman fleet to intercept Cossacks. Pasha reached the Cossacks at Sinop and blocked their path, where a battle took place, resulting in Cossack victory. Chikala Pasha lost three large ships and several small ones in this battle. After this battle, Cossacks attacked Istanbul. Cossacks plundered several areas in the Bosporus.

After this successful raid, Cossacks headed back to the Sich. However, the Sultan sent an Ottoman fleet led by Ibrahim Pasha to pursue them in Ochakov, in attempt to block their path to the Dnieper. Sahaidachny ordered Cossacks to go through Azov Sea, switching to a smaller boats in order to reach Sich. Ibrahim Pasha crossed the Dnieper all the way to the Sich, where a small Cossack garrison was stationed, which had escaped. Already near the Sich, Ibrahim Pasha's fleet and Cossack boats met, which resulted in battle, in which Cossacks came out victorious. Ibrahim Pasha fell in this battle.

== Aftermath ==
According to Ottoman chronicles, Cossacks killed 5,000–6,000 in Istanbul and took many captives, also burning half of the city. Cossack naval campaigns in the 1614–1617 were carried out on a large-scale. These sea raids detreated Ottoman relations with the Commonwealth, nearly leading to a war during this period. The war was avoided due to King's restrictions placed on Cossack raiding, as promised to Sultan. However, these restrictions were only temporary and had to be lifted in 1618 due to needed Cossack support for Polish campaigns during war against Russia.
