= Crimean campaign (1589) =

- Part of the Cossack raids
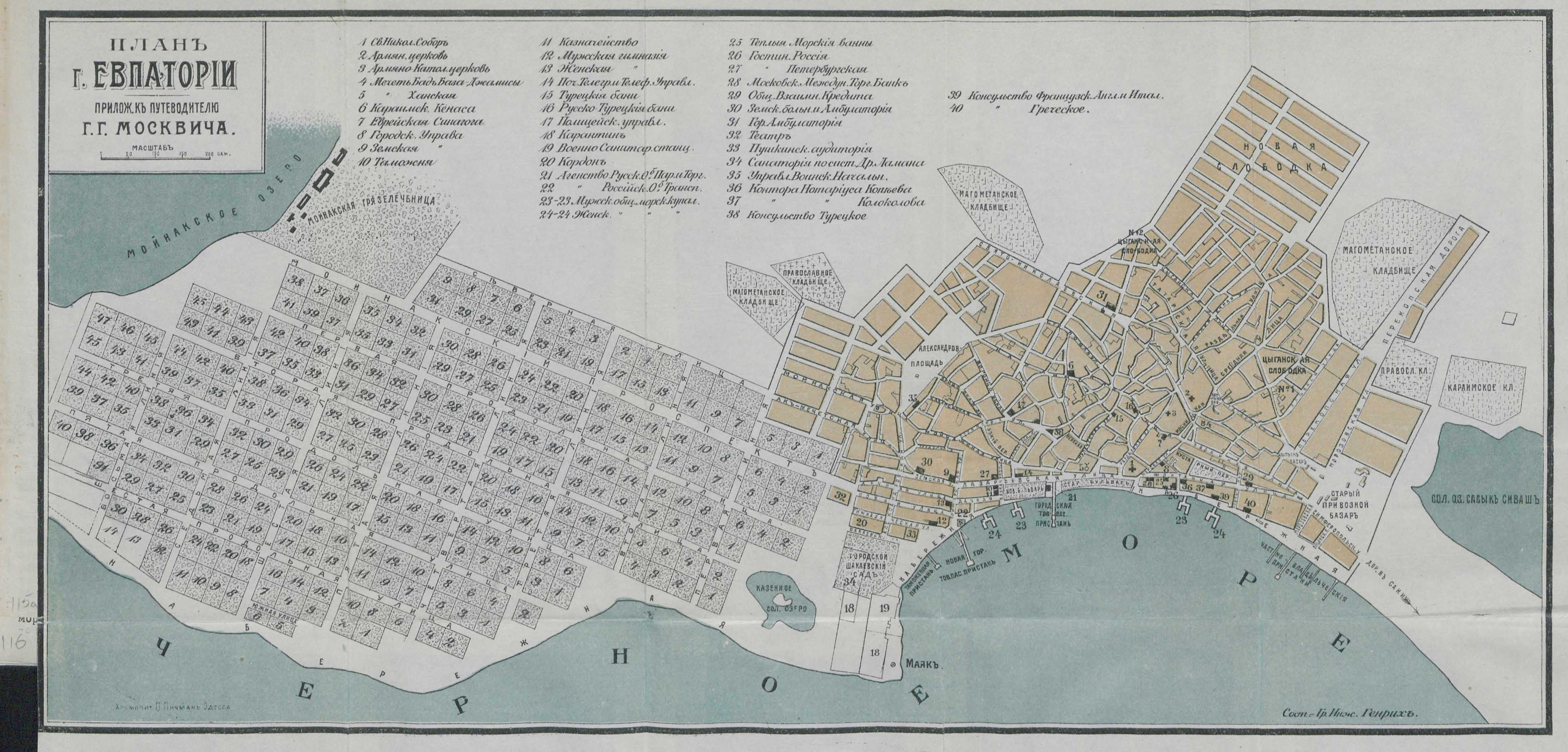
- 1904 map of Yevpatoria (Gezlev) which got attacked during the campaign
| Date | April of 1589 |
| Location | Gezlev and nearby settlements, Crimea |
| Result | See § Aftermath |
| Territorial changes | Cossacks temporarily defeat the Tatars but get pushed back on the next day |

Belligerents
| Zaporozhian Cossacks | Crimean Khanate; Ottoman Empire |

Commanders and leaders
| Zakhar Kulaga † | Ğazı II Giray; Feti-Giray |

Strength
| 800–1,500 | Unknown |

Casualties and losses
| At least 30 captured | Unknown amount of killed and wounded; Several galleys captured |
- Several civilians killed and captured

The Crimean campaign (Note: Crimean Tatar: Qırım Seferi Ukrainian: Кримський похід Turkish: Kırım Seferi) was a military expedition carried by the Zaporozhian Cossacks led by ataman Zakhar Kulaga against the Crimean Khanate and the Ottoman Empire in April 1589.

== Background ==
The Zaporozhian Cossacks were undertaking regular raids against the Ottoman Empire and the Crimean Khanate at the end of the 16th century. In 1575, Ruzhynsky's Cossacks devastated Crimea, in 1587 Cossacks sacked Ochakov and in 1588 Zaporozhians attacked the western coast of the Crimean peninsula and sacked several Tatar villages. In 1589, Zakhar Kulaga was elected hetman of the Zaporozhian Host. He gathered approximately 800 (according to other sources - 1500) Cossacks and sent them on a raid by the Dnieper.

== Campaign ==
In April, the Cossacks who had set off for the raid earlier, captured several Ottoman galleys that were stationed on the raid, invaded Crimea and sacked several Tatar villages Then they approached Gezlev (now Yevpatoria) at the night and attacked the city. They robbed shops and killed some of the city's inhabitants. However, in the morning a Crimean fleet led by kalga Feti-Giray approached Gezlev and attacked the Cossacks who were still in the city. The battle resulted in a Crimean victory with Zakhar Kulaga being killed and some 30 Cossacks being captured.

== Aftermath ==
Although the Crimean army eventually repelled the raid, most of the Cossacks managed to escape with captured loot. In a response to a Cossack attack, in the autumn of 1589 the Crimean forces raided Galicia and captured some loot there. While returning from the raid, the Tatar forces faced the Cossack army on the Dniester and a battle took place that resulted in Cossack victory. The raiders lost 9 thousand people and Ğazı Giray was wounded, the Cossacks suffered heavy casualties as well. The following year, the Cossacks launched a major raid on North Anatolia and captured the cities of Trebizond and Sinop.

== See also ==
- Cossack raids
- Crimean campaign (1575)
- Battle of Kaffa (1616)
