= Battle of Poti (1626) =

- Part of the Cossack raids and Cossack naval campaigns
Date	Spring of 1626
Location	Near Poti (now Georgia) 42.15°N 41.67°E
Result	Ottoman victory

Belligerents
Ottoman Empire	Zaporozhian Cossacks

Commanders and leaders
Unknown	Mykhailo Doroshenko

Strength
Unknown	60 chaykas

Casualties and losses
Unknown	Several killed and captured 30 chaykas destroyed and captured
- Location within Georgia

The Battle on Poti (Note: Turkish: Poti Muharebesi; Ukrainian: Битва за Поті; Georgian: ფოთის ბრძოლა) was a naval battle that took place between the Zaporozhian Cossacks and the Ottoman fleet in the spring of 1626, ending the Cossack expedition to Georgia.

== Background ==
Following the Treaty of Kurukove, Mykhailo Doroshenko was elected as the hetman of registered Cossacks. In early 1626, he gathered 60 chaykas for a raid on the Black sea coast of Caucasus. Before this, the Zaporozhian and Don Cossacks led by Oleksiy Shafran jointly raided Trabzon.

== Cossack campaign and battle ==
In the spring of 1626, the Cossack fleet that consisted of 60 chaykas had set off for a raid to the coast of Georgia. The Cossack squadron reached the mouth of river Rioni near Poti, where it was caught up and defeated by the Ottoman fleet. The Cossacks lost 30 chaykas – 20 were destroyed and 10 were captured.

== Aftermath ==
Despite the defeat, Cossacks continued their campaigns on the sea. In summer of the same year, the Zaporozhian and Don Cossacks had set off on a raid to the Bosporus, where they fought an unsuccessful battle against an Ottoman fleet and lost approximately 25 chaykas. In October 1626, the Cossacks of Mykhailo Doroshenko jointly with the Polish units of Stanislaw Chmielecki defeated the Tatar raiders at Bila Tserkva.
