= Cossack raids =

Reprisals for the Crimean–Nogai slave raids (1492–1774)

- Part of the Crimean–Nogai slave raids in Eastern Europe and Cossack naval campaigns
| Date | c. 1492 – 1774 (282 years) |
| Location | Crimea, Anatolia, Caucasus, lower Dnieper, west Don region, east Danube |

Belligerents
| Zaporozhian Cossacks; Don Cossacks Supported by: Russia (From 1547); Tsardom of Russia (1547–1721); Russian Empire (1721–1774) Cossack Hetmanate Kalmyk Khanate Moldavian opposition Kingdom of Poland | Ottoman Empire; Crimean Khanate; Nogai Horde Supported by: Pro-Ottoman Cossacks Moldavia Wallachia |

Commanders and leaders
| Notable figures: Bohdan Glynsky Ostap Dashkevych Dmytro Vyshnevetsky (executed) Mykhailo Vyshnevetsky Samiylo Kishka (POW) Bohdan Ruzhynsky Mykhailo Ruzhynsky Ivan Pidkova Yakiv Shah Zakhar Kulaga † Severyn Nalyvaiko Hryhoriy Loboda Jan Oryszowski Semen Skalozub † Hryhoriy Izapovych Petro Sahaidachny Mykhailo Doroshenko † Hryhoriy Chornyi Yakiv Borodavka-Neroda Taras Fedorovych Ivan Sulyma Ivan Sirko Bohdan Khmelnytsky Mykhailo Khanenko Ataman Dergun Ivan Gladkiy Ivan Zhdan-Rih Semyon Paliy Stefan Kunicki (executed) Mikhail Cherkashenin Ivan Katorzhnyi Mikhail Tatarinov Naum Vasiliev Osip Petrov Yasaul F. Poroshin Ivan Bogatyi Pavel Chesnochikhin Stenka Razin Frol Minaev | Notable figures: (Ottoman Empire) Murad III (Ottoman Empire) Ahmed I (Ottoman Empire) Nasuh Pasha (Ottoman Empire) Chikala Pasha (Ottoman Empire) Alkan-Pasha † (Ottoman Empire) Ibrahim Pasha † (Ottoman Empire) Hasan Pasha (POW) (Ottoman Empire) Ali-Pasha (POW) (Ottoman Empire) Mustafa I (Ottoman Empire) Murad IV (Ottoman Empire) Damat Halil Pasha (Ottoman Empire) Topal Recep Pasha (Ottoman Empire) Kskenash Pasha (Ottoman Empire) Kapudan Pasha (Ottoman Empire) Deli Hüseyin Pasha (Ottoman Empire) F. Cantacuzene (executed) (Ottoman Empire) Mehmed IV (Ottoman Empire) Melek Ahmed Pasha (Ottoman Empire) Pasha of Silistra (Ottoman Empire) Kara Mustafa Pasha (Ottoman Empire) Kara-Muhammad Meñli I Giray Saadet I Giray Devlet I Giray Murza Perekopský (executed) Ğazı II Giray Feti-Giray Buhar Kantymirowie Bahadır I Giray † Mehmed IV Giray Adil Giray Nurredin-Sultan Murad Giray Karach Bey † Murza Karabcha Shirin Bey Chimasov (POW) Y. Atamesh (POW) A.G Saltan (AWOL) Selim I Giray Khan Temir (WIA) и Murza Yanmamet (AWOL) Murza Tenmambet (POW) |

The Cossack raids were a series of military offensives conducted by the Cossacks (the Zaporozhian Cossacks of southern Ukraine and the Don Cossacks of southern Russia) between 1441 and 1774. Primarily occurring in the Crimean Khanate, the Nogai Horde, and the Ottoman Empire, the raids developed as a reaction to the Crimean–Nogai slave raids in Eastern Europe. Typical actions during these raids involved freeing enslaved Christians, plundering local settlements, and capturing Muslims for enslavement. Unlike the Tatars, the Cossacks could threaten fortified positions because of their access to cannons. Though difficult to calculate, the level of devastation caused by the Cossack raids is estimated to have been on a par with that of the Crimean–Nogai slave raids.

== Background ==
The first Zaporozhian Cossack raid was recorded on 1 August 1492, a raid on the Tatar settlement of Tiahynka. During this period, the Cossacks were less organized; their activities resembled guerrilla warfare or "steppe sport", with back-and-forth raids by Cossacks and Tatars. According to Mykhailo Hrushevsky, being a Cossack during this period was "more an occupation than a social status". This began to change in the 1580s, when Cossacks began acquiring higher social status in their respective states and transformed into regular military formations. Between the 1580s and the mid-17th century, Cossack raids were a major problem for the Crimean Khanate and Ottoman Empire.

Cossack raiders were often successful due to their adoption of gunpowder weaponry, allowing them to match the Crimean-Nogai raiders and Ottomans. The Cossacks also made efficient use of cannons. Many attacks were north of the Black Sea, but the Cossacks also attacked targets deep inside Anatolia (including the Ottoman capital of Istanbul). Zaporozhian sea raids ended in 1648 with the Khmelnytsky Uprising and formation of the Cossack Hetmanate, but Don Cossacks continued sea raiding until the 1660s and 1670s. By the 18th century, Cossack raids decreased in intensity due to increasing Russian control over Cossack hosts and their incorporation into the Imperial Russian Army. The raids ceased in 1783 with the end of Crimean-Nogai raids in Eastern Europe after the Russian annexation of Crimea.

== Conflict and raids ==
The Cossack conflict with the Tatars and Turks was often waged in parallel with Russia. They also acted independently of each other during the 16th century. The Cossacks preferred offense, but Russia primarily limited itself to passive defense.

=== Tatar raids ===
During the early 16th century Russia reinforced the Oka and Ugra rivers with fortifications and troops, their only defensive measures. The first Crimean raid on Russia took place from 1500 to 1503. The Tatars raided Chernihiv in 1503, and Russian envoys complained to the khan. In 1527, they reached the Oka and plundered Ryazan. From 1580 to 1590, Russia built defensive fortresses along the southern line of Belgorod, Voronezh, Lebedyan, and other cities. Russia was weakened by turmoil from 1607 to 1618, and the Tatars took the opportunity to plunder Bolkhov, Dankov, and Lebedyan despite the defensive line of fortresses.

In 1632, 20,000 Tatars devastated Yelets, Karachev, Livny, and other settlements. The following year, another 20,000-strong Tatar army looted Aleksin, Kaluga, Kashira, and other towns along the Oka; even Moscow, on the other side of the Oka, was affected. Russia ordered the construction of the Belgorod defense line in 1635, which stretched 800 kilometres (500 mi) from the Vorskla tributary of the Dnieper to the Chelnova River. Construction began in 1646, and took over 10 years to complete. Tsar Alexis expanded the defensive line to Russia's Crimean border. Tatar raiders were hardly deterred by these measures, abducting 150,000 to 200,000 people from Russia during the first half of the 17th century. Russia was forced to pay an average of 26,000 rubles annually in tribute to the Crimean Khanate (a total of one million rubles) during that time – according to modern calculations, the cost of building four new cities.

=== Cossack raids ===
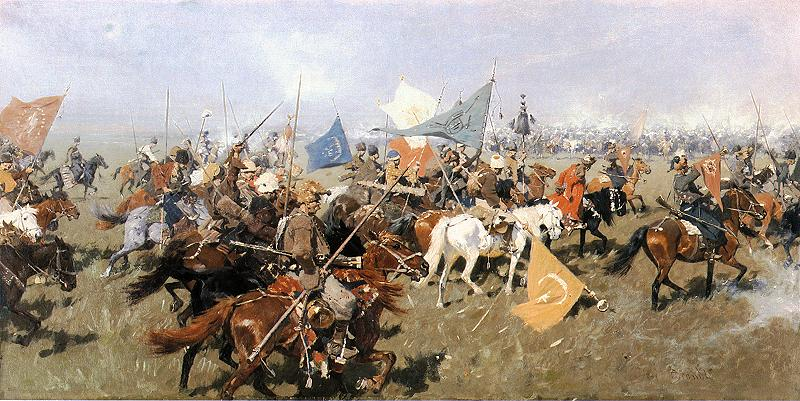
Cossacks returning from a campaign with Tatar banners

The Cossacks launched raids on land and sea. Cossack cavalry often picked off wandering Tatars along the northern Black Sea coast, plundering Ottoman fortresses on the lower Dnieper and Danube and in Crimea. In 1516, Cossacks besieged the Ottoman fortress in the port of Akkerman. Eight years later, they first attacked Crimea. The Cossacks attacked Ochakov in 1545 and looted its surrounding area, capturing an Ottoman delegation along the way.

Cossack influence rose in the Black Sea during the third quarter of the 16th century, and Ataman Foka Pokatilo's Cossacks devastated Akkerman. In 1575, Ataman Bogdan launched a Crimean campaign in response to Tatar attacks on Ukrainian territory. Bogdan later raided Kozlov, Trebizond, and Sinop. In 1587, Cossacks again attacked Kozlov and Akkerman. The Ottomans responded by establishing the Azov and Ochakov fortresses as a defense against Cossack raids; the Kizil-Kermen, Tavan, and Aslan fortresses were also built on the upper Dnieper and in the Don region. These small fortresses were ineffective at stopping the raiders, however, and the Cossacks learned to bypass them. The areas around Ochakov, Tighina, Akkerman, and Islam-Kermen were raided by the Zaporozhian Cossacks four or five times a year. According to Serhii Lepyavko, the Zaporozhian Cossacks conducted over 40 raids and seized 100,000 cattle, 17,000 horses, and 360,000 złoty between 1570 and the 1580s.

=== Russian policy and the Cossacks ===
Russia began assisting the Cossacks under Ivan the Terrible, providing them with military supplies. Despite this, the ineffective Russian policy of trying to appease the Crimean Khanate continued. Tatar raids continued; unlike their Polish and Swedish counterparts, the Crimean khans were unwilling to negotiate. Russia ordered the Cossacks to stop raiding the Tatars, threatening to cut off their financial and military support, but the Cossacks often ignored these orders. Russia moved forward in cutting off its support, imposing an economic embargo on the Zaporozhian Sich and the Don region.

Russia entered armed confrontations with the Cossacks to appease the Crimean Khanate and Ottoman Empire. During the early 1630s, Russia ordered the Don Cossacks to stop raiding the Tatars and Turks. The Don Cossacks disobeyed these orders, and were willing to revolt. The Zaporozhian Cossacks had minimal connections with Russia during this time, and acted more recklessly.

=== Assessment ===
Russia's ineffectiveness against Tatar raids was attributed to a flawed strategy which sought to appease the raiders, and limited itself to defenses incapable of stopping the raiders or inflicting heavy losses on them. Tatar raiders could be restrained only through offensive action, which the Cossacks frequently conducted. As inhabitants and defenders of border regions, the Cossacks did not limit themselves to defense; they organized defenses that repelled Tatar attacks and, in response to Tatar losses, launched retaliatory strikes. The Cossacks were more effective than Russia against Tatar raids.

== Sea raids ==
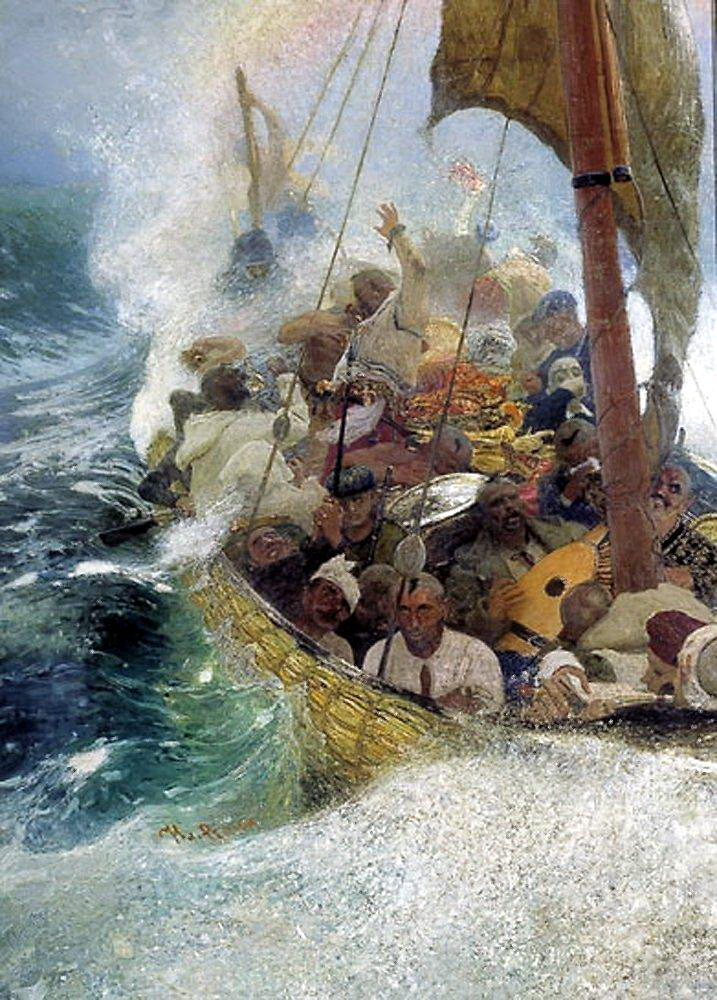
Cossacks on the Black Sea by Ilya Repin, 1908

Black Sea piracy was rare until the Cossacks began conducting sea raids. Until the mid-16th century, maritime Ottoman superiority was undisputed; this changed when the Cossacks began frequent sea raids during the 1550s. Ottoman officials viewed Cossack sea raiding with great concern, fearing an outbreak of banditry in the Black Sea. The Cossacks were better-organized than typical bandits – capable of adapting to harsh frontier conditions and using the environment for their benefit, which allowed them to harass an empire the size of the Ottoman. Cossack society also attracted diverse individuals, from escaped serfs to mercenaries and dissenters from neighboring empires, who found the ungoverned Wild Fields appealing.

For the Cossacks, sea raiding was economical because they had developed a "water culture" from living near rivers. Their boats, known as chaikas, resembled upgraded Viking ships. The Cossacks could call up to 300 chaikas for a campaign, and their boats had greater mobility than Ottoman ships. Cossacks in chaikas were active in the Black Sea.

French military engineer Vasseur de Beauplan provided his account of Cossack sailing:

... The Turks are usually aware of the expedition, and they hold several galleys in readiness at the mouth of the Borysthenes to prevent the Cossacks from coming out to sea. However, the Cossacks, who have greater cunning, sneak out on a dark night close to the new moon, keeping themselves hidden in the reeds that are found for three or four leagues up the Borysthenes, where the galleys dare not venture, having suffered great damage there in the past. The Turks are content to wait at the mouth of the river, where they are always surprised [by the raiders].

However, the Cossacks cannot pass so quickly that they cannot be seen, and the alarm is then sounded throughout the whole country, even as far as Constantinople. The Great Lord [sultan] sends messengers all along the coasts...warning that the Cossacks have put to sea, so that everyone may be on his guard. All is in vain, however, since the Cossacks choose their time and season so advantageously that in 36 or 40 hours they have reached Anatolia. They land, each man carrying his firearm, leaving only two men and two boys on guard in each boat. They surprise the towns, capture them, loot and burn them, venturing sometimes as far as a league inland. Then they return immediately [to their boats] and embark with their booty, to try their luck elsewhere.

=== Impact of sea raids ===
The partially-successful need to counter Cossack sea raids led the Ottomans to withdraw a significant portion of their naval forces from the Mediterranean Sea, weakening their influence. Cossack sea raids also had an economic impact, discouraging trade on the Ottoman shore due to the risk of attack. As explorer Evliya Çelebi noted, the rural population of Sinop was unwilling to engage in agriculture because they believed their harvest would be destroyed during Cossack attacks.

Cossack raids demonstrated in the long term that the Ottoman Empire, which had conquered southeast Europe centuries before, was not invincible and its era of influence over European affairs was coming to an end. European and Ottoman chronicles of the devastation caused by Cossack sea raids resembled those describing Gothic sea attacks on the Byzantine Empire during the fifth century.

== Impact ==
=== Crimean Khanate and Nogai Horde ===
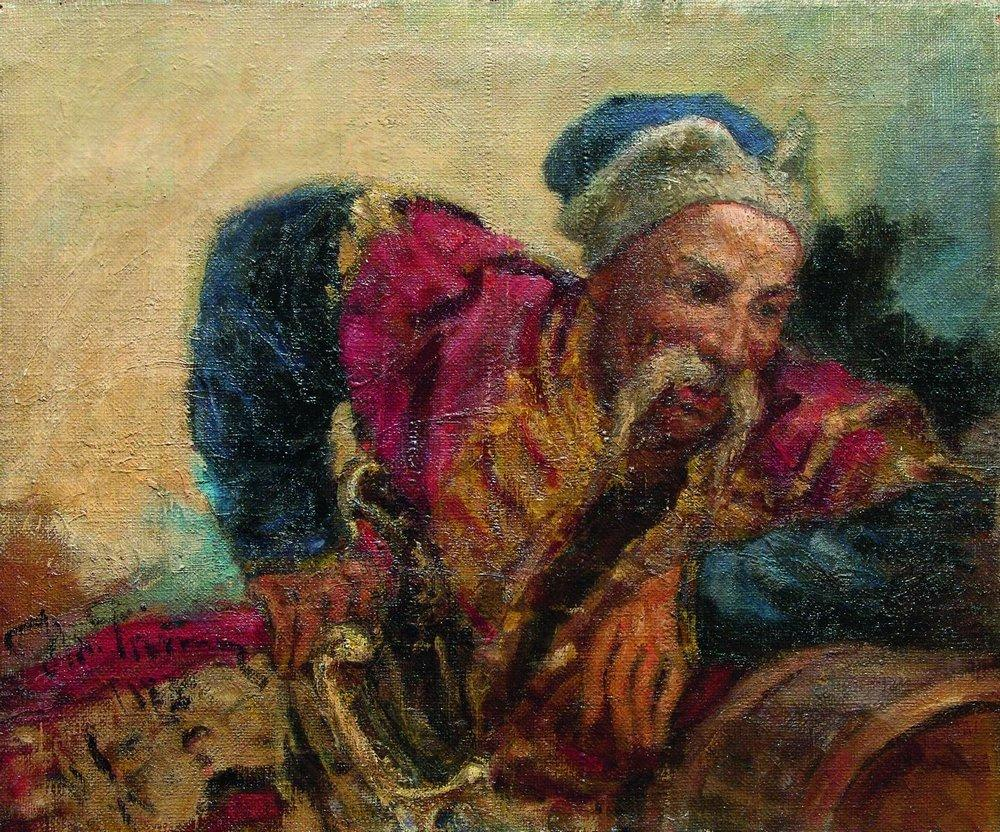
Ivan Sirko; detail from a painting by Ilya Repin

When exploring Crimea, Evliya Çelebi noted signs of depopulation and attributed them to Cossack raids. In addition to devastating Tatar lands, Cossack raids deterred Tatar raiders from attacking Ukrainian lands. Cossack raiding also had a psychological effect on the Tatars, especially during the era of Cossack leader Ivan Sirko. Polish chronicler Wespazjan Kochowski described the Tatar attitude toward Sirko in Crimea:

He was terrible in the Horde, for he was experienced in military campaigns and a brave cavalier, surpassing Doroshenko in this. And in the Crimea, his name inspired such fear that the Horde was on guard every day and was ready for battle, as if Sirko had already attacked. The Tatars quite seriously considered him a devil and even their children, when they cried and could not calm down, frightened Sirko, saying: 'Sirko is coming', after these words the crying immediately died down ...

=== Ottoman Empire ===
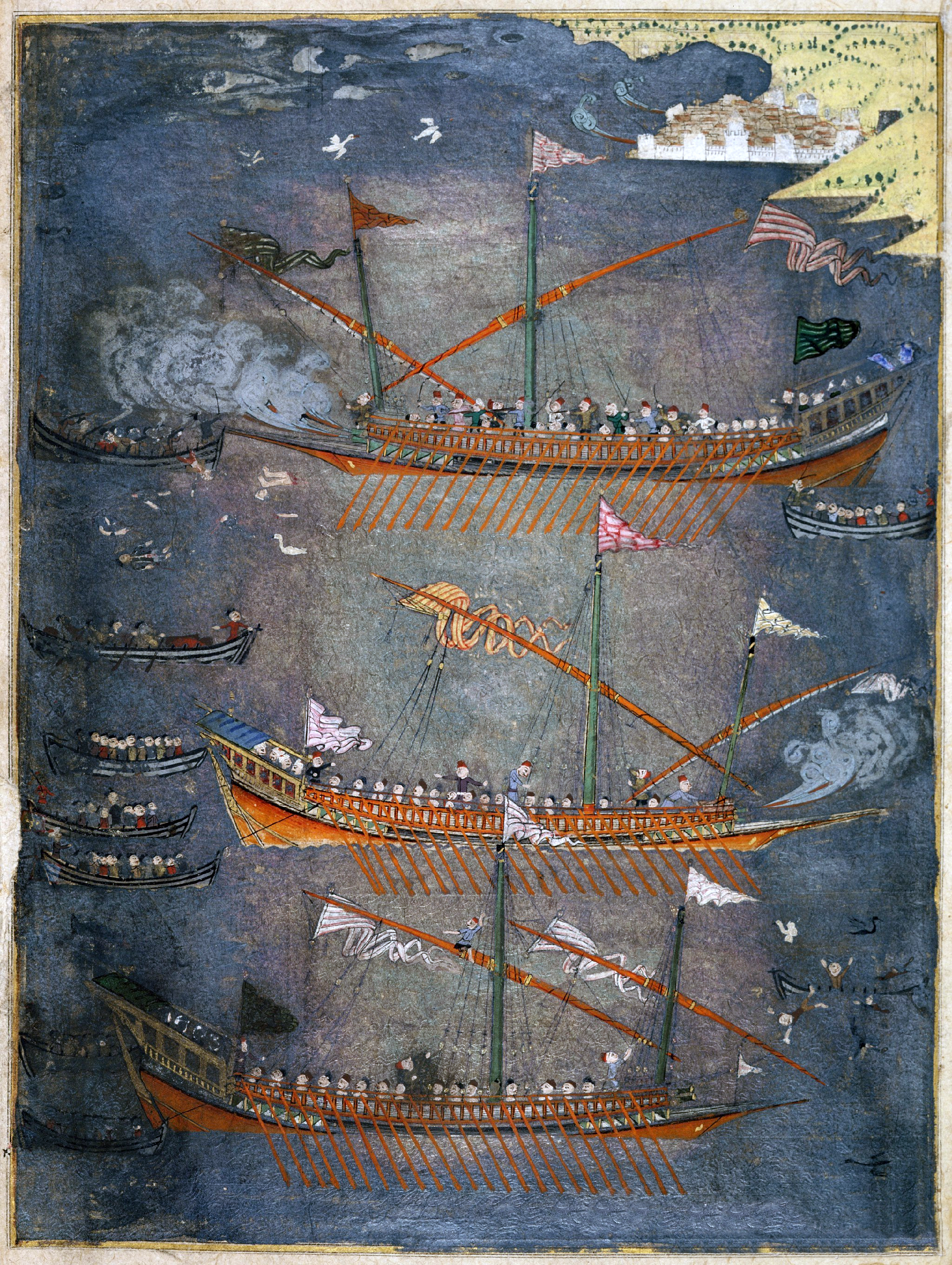
The Turkish fleet repelling a Cossack attack

Cossack raids inflicted significant economic losses on the Ottoman Empire, resulting in a decline of its military power. The raids also had a psychological impact, particularly the Zaporozhian raids from 1672 to 1674. An influential Ottoman sultan reportedly admitted that thinking about the Cossacks kept him awake at night.

Sultan Mehmed IV demanded in 1675 that the Zaporozhian Cossacks, led by Ivan Sirko, submit to Ottoman rule. The Cossacks responded with a letter full of profanity and insults. This inspired the most popular painting in Ukrainian-Russian history, Ilya Repin's Reply of the Zaporozhian Cossacks.

=== Europe ===
The Zaporozhian Cossacks were more adaptable than their Tatar counterparts. During the 16th century, Chevalier wrote: "There was no warrior better fitted to outfight a Tatar than a Zaporozhian". Ottoman sultans often complained to the neighboring states about Zaporozhian attacks, but their rulers denied any association with them. The Tatars and Turks sometimes inflicted considerable losses on the Cossacks. In 1593, the Tatars burnt Tomakivka Sich while the Cossacks were away. The Zaporozhian host had no trouble recruiting and building a new fleet in a short time, but struggled to find horses. Pope Clement VIII, Polish kings, and even Habsburg emperors recognized Cossack efficiency in fighting the Ottomans and sought them as allies. Tsar Feodor I described the Zaporozhian Cossacks to the Austrian delegation as "good fighters, but cruel and treacherous".

Italian Dominican missionary Emidio Portelli d'Ascoli said about the brutality of Cossack raids, "The Cossacks destroy, rob, burn, lead off into slavery, kill; often they besiege fortified cities, take them by storm, devastate, and burn them down". French military engineer Vasseur de Beauplan agreed:

It is these people [Cossacks] who often, [indeed] almost every year, go raiding on the Black Sea, to the great detriment of the Turks. Many times they have plundered Crimea, which belongs to Tatary, ravaged Anatolia, sacked Trebizond, and even ventured as far as the mouth of the Black Sea, three leagues from Constantinople, where they have laid waste to everything with fire and sword, returning home with much booty and a number of slaves, usually young children, whom they keep for their own service or give as gifts to the lords of their homeland. No old people are detained, unless they are judged rich enough to buy their freedom by paying ransom.

== List of Cossack raids ==
Cossack raids
| Name | Date | Location | Perpetrators | Result | Notes |
|---|---|---|---|---|---|
| Raid on Tiahynka | 1 August 1492 | Tiahynka | Zaporozhian Cossacks | Victory | First documented Zaporozhian raid |
| Sack of Ochakov | 1493 | Ochakov | Zaporozhian Cossacks | Victory | |
| Raid on Aq Kirmān | 1516 | Aq Kirmān | Zaporozhian Cossacks | Victory | |
| Crimean campaign | 1523 | Crimea | Zaporozhian Cossacks | Victory | |
| Polish-Cossack raid on Ochakov | End of 1528 | Ochakov | Zaporozhian Cossacks | Victory | |
| Capture of Ochakov | 23 October 1545 | Ochakov | Zaporozhian Cossacks | Victory | |
| Crimean campaign | September 1575 | Crimea | Zaporozhian Cossacks; Don Cossacks | Victory | |
| Battle of Azov | 1576 | Azov | Don Cossacks | Defeat | |
| Moldavian campaign | 11–29 November 1577 | Moldavia | Zaporozhian Cossacks | Victory | |
| Crimean campaign | July 1589 | Crimea | Zaporozhian Cossacks | Inconclusive | |
| Moldavian campaigns | 1593–1595 | Moldavia | Zaporozhian Cossacks | Victory | |
| Raid on Kiliia | 1602 | Kiliya | Zaporozhian Cossacks | Victory | |
| Raid on Kiliya and Aq Kirmān | 1606 | Kiliya and Aq Kirmān | Zaporozhian Cossacks | Victory | |
| Battle of Varna | Summer 1606 | Varna | Zaporozhian Cossacks | Victory | |
| Raid on Ochakov | 1607 | Ochakov | Zaporozhian Cossacks | Victory | |
| Raid on Perekop | 1608 | Perekop | Zaporozhian Cossacks | Victory | |
| Raid on the Danube | 1608 | Danube delta | Zaporozhian Cossacks | Victory | |
| Raid on Kiliya, Izmail and Aq Kirmān | 1609 | Kiliya, Izmail and Aq Kirmān | Zaporozhian Cossacks | Victory | |
| Raid on Northern Anatolia | 1613 | Northern Anatolia | Zaporozhian Cossacks | Victory | |
| Raid on Sinop | 1614 | Sinop | Zaporozhian Cossacks | Victory | |
| Raid on Istanbul | 1615 | Istanbul | Zaporozhian Cossacks | Victory | |
| Battle of Kaffa | 1616 | Kaffa | Zaporozhian Cossacks | Victory | |
| Raid on North Anatolia | 1616 | Northern Anatolia | Zaporozhian Cossacks | Victory | |
| Raid on Istanbul | 1617 | Istanbul | Zaporozhian Cossacks | Victory | |
| Raid on Istanbul | 1620 | Istanbul | Zaporozhian Cossacks | Victory | |
| Raid on Varna | 25 August 1620 | Varna | Zaporozhian Cossacks | Victory | |
| Raid on the Black Sea | 1621 | Kaffa, Bosporus strait | Zaporozhian Cossacks | Victory | |
| Raid on Trebizond | 1621 | Trebizond | Zaporozhian Cossacks | Victory | |
| Raid on Rize | 1621 | Rize | Zaporozhian Cossacks | Defeat | |
| Siege of Soroca | 1621 | Soroca | Zaporozhian Cossacks | Victory | Yakiv Borodavka's Cossacks besieged and sacked the city that summer. |
| Battle of Bosporus | July 1622 | Bosporus strait | Zaporozhian Cossacks | Defeat | |
| Raids on Istanbul | 1623 | Istanbul | Zaporozhian Cossacks | Victory | |
| Raids on Istanbul | 9 July – 8 September 1624 | Istanbul | Zaporozhian Cossacks | Victory | |
| Battle of Karaharman | 1625 | Karaharman | Zaporozhian Cossacks; Don Cossacks | Defeat | |
| Battle of Poti | 1626 | Poti | Zaporozhian Cossacks | Defeat | |
| Raid on Istanbul | 1629 | Istanbul | Zaporozhian Cossacks | Victory | |
| Battle of Ochakov | 1630 | Ochakov | Zaporozhian Cossacks | Defeat | |
| Raid on Trebizond | 1631 | Trebizond | Zaporozhian Cossacks; Don Cossacks | Victory | |
| Raids on Azov | 1634 | Azov | Don Cossacks | Indecisive | The Cossacks, although they did not capture the fortress, looted Azov. |
| Siege of Azov | 21 April 1637 – 30 April 1642 | Azov | Zaporozhian Cossacks; Don Cossacks | Victory | |
| Attack on Azov | October 1644 | Azov | Don Cossacks | Victory | |
| Battle of Taman | June 1646 | Taman | Don Cossacks | Defeat | |
| Raid on Azov | 1646 | Azov | Don Cossacks | Defeat | |
| Crimean campaign | 1646 | Crimea | Don Cossacks | Defeat | |
| Raid on Temryuk | 1648 | Temryuk | Don Cossacks | Victory | |
| Raid on Sinop | 1651 | Sinop | Don Cossacks | Victory | |
| Raid on Istanbul | 1652 | Istanbul | Don Cossacks | Victory | |
| Battle of Batumi | 1652 | Batumi | Zaporozhian Cossacks | Defeat | |
| Devastation of Southern Crimea | 1653 | Southern Crimea | Don Cossacks | Victory | Don Cossacks ravaged the southern Crimean coast from Sudak to Balaklava for three months. |
| Raid on Trebizond | 1653 | Trebizond | Don Cossacks | Victory | |
| Crimean blockade | 6 July – 14 September 1655 | Crimea | Zaporozhian Cossacks; Don Cossacks | Victory | The Cossacks seized Taman Peninsula and terrorized Crimea for two months. |
| Raid on Ochakov | 1660 | Ochakov | Zaporozhian Cossacks | Victory | |
| Raid on Aslan-Kermen | 1660 | Aslan-Kermen | Zaporozhian Cossacks | Victory | |
| Raid on Crimea | 1660 | Crimea | Zaporozhian Cossacks | Victory | |
| Siege of Perekop | 1663 | Perekop | Zaporozhian Cossacks; Don Cossacks | Victory | |
| Crimean campaign | 1667 | Crimea | Zaporozhian Cossacks | Victory | |
| Crimean campaigns (1668) | October – November 1668 | Crimea | Zaporozhian Cossacks; Don Cossacks | Victory | |
| Siege of Ochakov | 20 June 1670 | Ochakov | Zaporozhian Cossacks | Victory | |
| Raid on Budjak | May 1673 | Budjak | Zaporozhian Cossacks | Victory | |
| Raid on Aq Kirmān | May 1673 | Aq Kirmān | Zaporozhian Cossacks | Victory | |
| Raid on Ochakov | May 1673 | Ochakov | Zaporozhian Cossacks | Victory | |
| Raid on Aslan-Kermen | May 1673 | Aslan-Kermen | Zaporozhian Cossacks | Victory | |
| Raid on Izmail | May 1673 | Izmail | Zaporozhian Cossacks | Victory | |
| Raid on Crimea | May 1673 | Crimea | Zaporozhian Cossacks | Victory | |
| Crimean campaign (1675) | 23 – 29 September 1675 | Crimea | Zaporozhian Cossacks; Don Cossacks | Victory | The Cossacks captured Bakhchysarai. |
| Battle of Temryuk | 1678 | Temryuk | Don Cossacks | Defeat | Ataman Radion Kaluzhenin and Esaul Fedor Murzin were killed. |
| Raid on Crimea | 1679 | Crimea | Zaporozhian Cossacks | Victory | Ivan Sirko forced Khan Murad Giray to flee into the Crimean mountains. |
| Raids on Azov and Temryuk | 1685 | Azov, Temryuk | Don Cossacks | Victory | |
| Battle of Don River | 1687 | Don River | Don Cossacks | Defeat | Ataman Pyotr Kalmyk was captured and executed. |
| Raid on Ochakov | 1690 | Ochakov | Zaporozhian Cossacks | Victory | |
| Raid on Kizil-Taş | 1692 | Kizil-Taş | Don Cossacks | Victory | |
| Raid on Kizikermen | 1693 | Kizikermen | Zaporozhian Cossacks | Victory | |
| Raids on Temyruk and Kizil-Taş | 1694 | Temyruk, Kizil-Taş | Don Cossacks Zaporozhian Cossacks | Victory | |
| Crimean campaign | 1737 | Crimea | Zaporozhian Cossacks; Don Cossacks | Victory | |
| Raid on Balta | 1768 | Balta | Zaporozhian Cossacks | Victory | The Cossack sack of Balta was a pretext for the Russo-Turkish War (1768–1774). |
| Raid on Dubăsari | 1768 | Dubăsari Zaporozhian Cossacks | Victory | | |
| Raids on Kinburn | 1769 | Kinburn Peninsula | Zaporozhian Cossacks | Victory | |
| Raid on Hacı-Hassan | 1769 | Hacı-Hassan | Zaporozhian Cossacks | Victory | |

== Bibliography ==
- Davies, Brian (2007). Warfare, State and Society on the Black Sea Steppe, 1500-1700. Routledge. ISBN 978-0415239868.
- Roşu, Felicia (2021). Slavery In The Black Sea Region, C. 900– 1900. Chapter 8 (Maryna Kravets & Victor Ostapchuk). Brill. ISBN 978-9004470712.
- Коляда, І.А. (2012). Отаман Сірко (in Ukrainian). Folio. ISBN 978-966-03-5804-1.
- Şirokorad, A. B. (2009). Osmanli - Rus Savaslari (in Turkish). Selenge. ISBN 9789758839636.
- King, Charles (2005). The Black Sea: A History (1 ed.). Oxford University Press, USA. ISBN 019928394X.
- Seaton, Albert (1996). The Horsemen of the Steppes. Barnes & Noble Books. ISBN 0760700834.
- *Ивануц, Михаил (2012). "К вопросу об участии казаков в боевых действиях по осаде и обороне укрепленных пунктов в XVI в." (in Russian). Нові дослідження пам'яток козацької доби в Україні: Зб. наук.
- Williams, Brian Glyn (2013). "The Sultan's Raiders: The Military Role of the Crimean Tatars in the Ottoman Empire" (PDF). Washington, D.C.: The Jamestown Foundation.
