= Cossack raid on Kiliia =

- Part of the Cossack raids and Cossack naval campaigns
Date	May of 1602
Location	Kiliia, Ottoman Empire
Result	Cossack victory

Belligerents
Zaporozhian Cossacks	Ottoman Empire

Commanders and leaders
Petro Sahaidachny	(Ottoman Empire) Hasan-aga

Strength
30 chaykas several galleys	Unknown

Casualties and losses
Unknown	1 galley captured Several merchant ships captured

The Cossack raid on Kiliia was one of the first Cossack raids on the Ottoman territory in XVII century. The Cossacks on 30 chaykas defeated the Ottoman fleet and plundered the city of Kiliia.

== Background ==
The Cossacks were often going on a raids against the Ottoman Empire and it's vassal Crimean Khanate. The raids had intensified at the end of XVI century − in 1595, the Cossacks attacked Akkerman and Sinop, and in 1598 they raided Silistria, Tighina and Kiliia.

== Raid ==
The Cossack fleet that consisted of 30 chaykas and several galleys approached Kiliia, where they had encountered an Ottoman fleet. A battle took place, as a result of which, the Ottoman fleet was defeated. The Cossacks captured one galley and several merchant ships.

== Aftermath ==
Following the raid, the Cossacks entered Dniester estuary, where they had a battle with an Ottoman ship of Hasan-aga. Then they went towards Akkerman. Near the city they captured another Ottoman galley. In Autumn 1602, a 1,000-strong Cossack detachment led by ataman Gursky invaded the Ottoman vassal Moldavia.

== Bibliography ==
- Serczyk, Wladysław (1984). Na dalekiej Ukrainie: dzieje Kozaczyzny do 1648 roku (PDF).
