= Raid on Varna =

Cossack raid on Varna
- Part of the Cossack raids, Cossack naval campaigns and the Ottoman–Polish War (1620–1621)
Date	25 August 1620
Location	Varna, Rumelia Eyalet, Ottoman Empire (Present-day Bulgaria)
Result	Cossack victory

Belligerents
Zaporozhian Cossacks	Ottoman Empire

Commanders and leaders
Yakiv Borodavka-Neroda; Ivan Sirko	(Ottoman Empire) Mustafa I

Strength
150 boats	Unknown

The Raid on Varna (Note: Turkish: Varnaya Baskın Ukrainian: Наліт на Варну Bulgarian: Обсада Варни) was conducted by the Zaporozhian Cossacks after their raid on Istanbul, on 25 August 1620.

== Prelude ==
On August 9, Cossacks were now fully done with the Russo-Polish War and could again focus on lower Dnieper, conducting numerous raids on the Tatar and Turkish territories, and acted jointly, both the Zaporozhian and Sloboda Cossacks. They organized together went on a campaign, devastating the European coast of Turkey on the Black Sea.

== Raid ==
On August 25, Cossacks of the Murafa unit led by Ivan Sirko, took part with other Cossacks in the campaign on 150 boats. On the Black Sea, they raided and plundered Varna. After this, they raided Perekop and devastated it. These cities were completely looted and Cossacks returned to the Sich. Before these attacks, Cossacks raided Istanbul.

== Aftermath ==
Cossack raids on Turkish-Tatar territories, especially Istanbul ended up becoming a pretext for attack on Cecora.
