= Crimean campaign (1675) =

Cossack victory over the Ottomans

- Part of the Russo-Turkish War (1672–1681) and Cossack raids
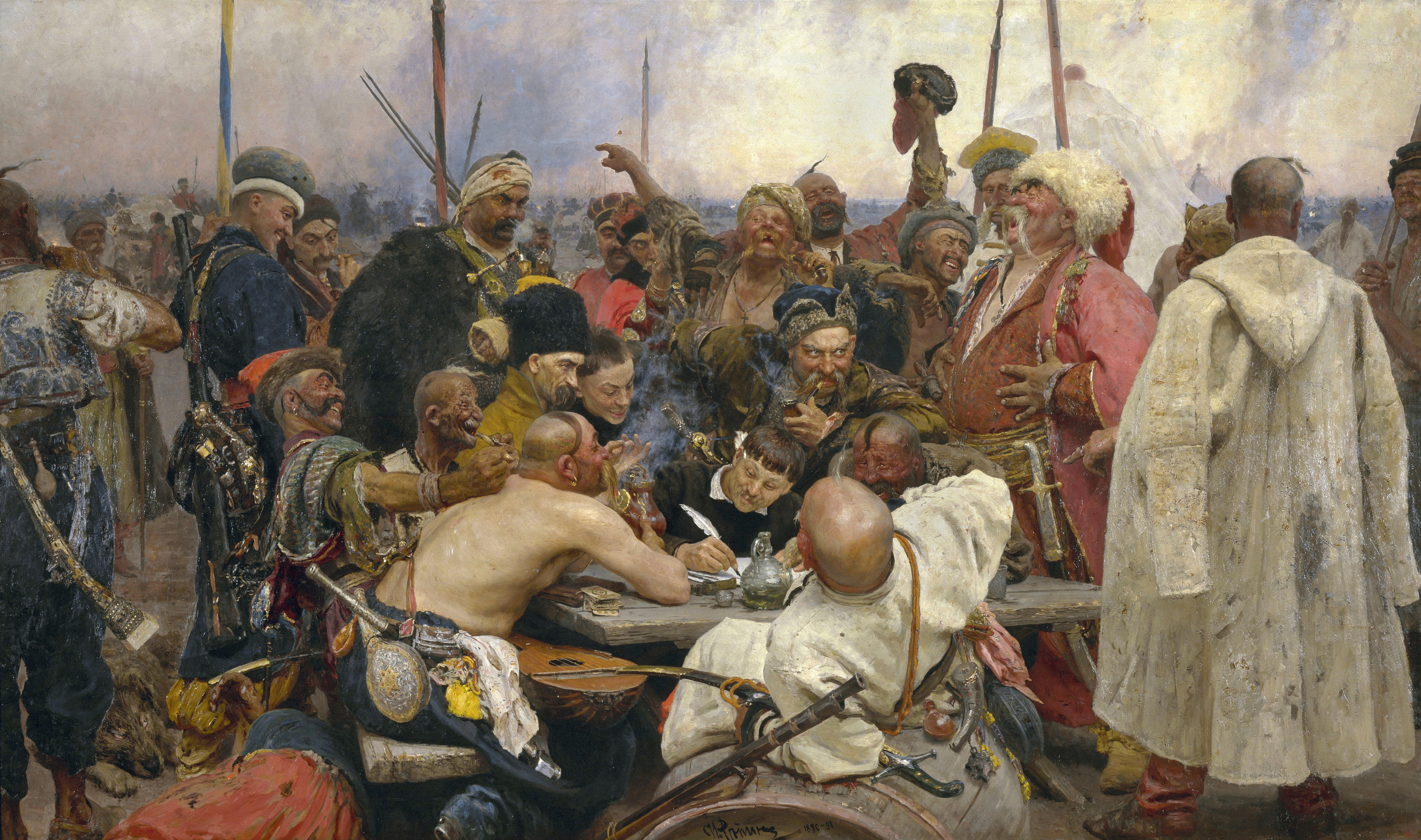
- Reply of the Zaporozhian Cossacks by Ilya Repin
Date	23 – 29 September 1675
Location	Crimea
Result	Allied victory

Belligerents
Allies: Zaporozhian Cossacks; Don Cossacks; Tsardom of Russia; Kalmyk Khanate; Kabardia	Crimean Khanate; Ottoman Empire

Commanders and leaders
Ivan Sirko; Frol Minaev (Tsardom of Russia) Kasbulat Cherkassky; Mazan Batyr	Selim I Giray

Strength
20,000; Modern estimate: 1,500 to 2,500; 300 (Tsardom of Russia) 546 to 800; 1,000	50,000 (Ottoman Empire) Unknown

Casualties and losses
Light; 13 dead	10,000 killed; 6,000 captured (Ottoman Empire) Heavy
- Heavy civilian casualties

The Crimean campaign took place between the Crimean-Ottoman forces and the Zaporozhian Cossacks together with their allies, during the Zaporozhian Cossack campaign into Crimea, in September 1675.

== Prelude ==
In 1675, in last days of July, Sirko announced his intentions to Cossacks about the planned campaign to "shake up the whole Crimea mercilessly". Sirko wanted to take revenge on the Crimean Tatars and Ottomans for their attempt to destroy Sich the previous winter. In the summer of 1675, the Russian government decided to conduct a raid on the territory of the Crimean Khanate, for which they allocated a detachment of Prince Cherkassky (747 people, however, due to illness and desertion, at the time of the outbreak of hostilities, he numbered about 546). He was joined by a detachment of Kalmyks from Mazan Batyr with 1,000. Due to their small numbers, the Russians began negotiations with Ataman Sirko, persuading him to allocate 1,500 to 2,500 men. At the last moment, 50 Don Cossacks joined them.

== Campaign ==
Ivan Sirko managed to sneak with the army into Crimea, unnoticed by the Tatars. He stationed half of his army at Perekop and went with the rest of his army further into Crimea. He took 3,000–4,000 Cossacks with him, and asked the rest of the army, commanded by their respective leaders, to devastate entirety of Crimea.

Zaporozhian Cossacks and their allies devastated Kozlov, Karasubazar and other Crimean cities. Khan Selim I Giray heard about the news of the enemies in Crimea on their way to the capital of the Crimean Khanate, Bakhchysarai. He chose to retreat with his army to the Crimean mountains. Some Tatars fled to the mountains to reorganise with Khan's army, others fortified themselves in the cities in attempt to repel the invaders. Despite Tatar efforts to repel the assaults, they were defeated. Many Tatars were killed or captured. Ivan Sirko with his Cossacks sacked Bakhchysarai after Khan's retreat from the capital. Cossacks devastated Crimean cities and villages, including Khan's capital, where Cossacks put everything to "fire and sword".

Khan reorganized his army in the mountains, with his 50,000 troops he headed to the capital. However, when the Khan arrived, he was shocked at the ruins of Bakhchysarai, while the Cossacks already left. Khan wanted to ambush the Cossack army, who were carrying prisoners and loot on their way to pass through Perekop, which he learned from captured Cossacks. Sirko found out about Khan's plan from captured Tatars. Sirko ordered the Cossack army in Crimea to wave captured Tatar flags to deceive Khan's army. Sirko himself sneaked to Perekop where half of his army was stationed.

After Khan reached Perekop and realised the Zaporozhian Cossacks with Sirko were there, he went into battle with Sirko's Cossacks, but suffered a defeat and retreated, his army lost 4,000 troops as a result. Sirko saw an incoming army waving Tatar flags behind Khan, recognizing his Cossacks and allies. Khan thought that the Tatars in Crimea managed to reorganise and were coming to his aid, so he once again attacked Sirko's army, but suffered another defeat with heavy losses.

As the Khan was retreating with his army after another failed attack, Sirko with his army pursued Khan's army. After Khan realised that the army behind him waving Tatar flags were Cossacks, his army went into the state of disorganised panic and scattered across the fields in the hasty retreat. Taking advantage of their disorganization, Cossacks and their allies killed several thousand Tatars and captured several thousand more. Khan narrowly escaped.

After victory over the Khan's army and taking some rest, Cossacks with their allies decided to leave Crimea. They looted several Tatars villages on the way back. They didn't want to risk running into an ambush on the way to the Sich, so they chose another path.

== Chorna Dolyna ==
Sirko with his Cossacks and captives got a safe distance away from Crimea to the place called Chorna Dolyna, also known as Black Valley. Sirko set up a camp there and ordered food to be cooked for the captives. Among the captives were 6,000 Tatars, who he ordered to be tied up and separated from the 7,000 Rus' captives. After asking the Rus' captives whether they wanted to go to the native Rus' or go back to Crimea, 3,000 wanted to go back to Crimea. Sirko asked why, they said they had their property and family in Crimea. Many of these Rus' captives were converts to Islam who intermarried with Tatar women, their offspring in Crimea were tuma (half-Tatar). Sirko was watching as they were heading back to Crimea and realized that they weren't going to turn back, so he ordered Cossacks to pursue and execute them. As Sirko stood over corpses of the executed captives, he was quoted to have said:

Brothers, forgive me, but it is better that you should lie here awaiting the terrible judgment of God than go back to Crimea to help them [Tatars] increase in numbers and risk the eternal damnation of your souls.

== Aftermath ==
The Crimean-Ottoman forces suffered heavy losses. 6,000 Tatars and unspecified number of Turks were captured. Ivan Sirko took revenge for the attack on Sich. After this campaign, he allegedly sent a reply to Khan Selim I Giray. He wrote:

The respectable Crimean Khan with many troops our neighbor! ... You came to us, the army of Zaporozhye, with the Sultan's janissaries and many Crimean hordes. And because your deed upset us and gave us the disappointment, then reconcile ancient ancestors and our brethren, we decided to try take revenge on your Khan mercy and all the Khanate, but not secretly, but openly, chivalrously.

Ivan Sirko sent a letter to Hetman Samoylovych describing the success of his campaign with his allies, claiming to have avoided serious losses.

== See also ==
- Crimean campaign (1575)
- Battle of Kaffa (1616)
- Crimean campaign (1667)

== Bibliography ==
- Yavornytsky, Dmytro (1894). Иван Дмитриевич Сирко, славный кошевой атаман войска запорожских низовых козаков [Ivan Dmitrievich Sirko, the glorious koshevoy ataman of the Zaporozhian lowland Cossack army] (in Russian). Saint Petersburg. ISBN 9785971042556.
- Velikanov, Vladimir; Nechitailov, Maxim (2019). Азиатский дракон перед Чигирином [Asian dragon in front of Chigirin] (in Russian). Russian Academy of Sciences: Ratnoe delo. Moscow: Русские витязи. ISBN 978-5-6041924-7-4.
- Wagner, Marek (2009). Wojna polsko-turecka w latach 1672-1676. Seria Bitwy/Taktyka (Wyd. 1 ed.). Zabrze: Wydawn. "inforteditions". ISBN 978-83-89943-34-7.
