= Battle of Bila Tserkva (1612) =

- Part of the Crimean–Nogai slave raids in Eastern Europe
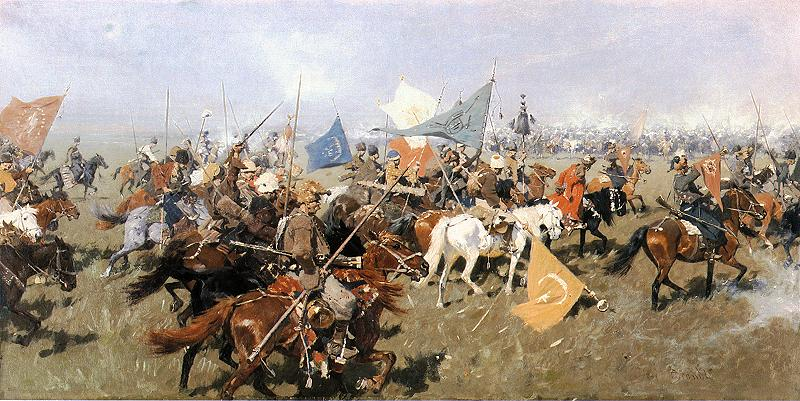
- Victorious return of the Cossacks with Tatar banners
| Date | Autumn 1612 |
| Location | Bila Tserkva, Kiev Voivodeship |
| Result | Cossack victory |

Belligerents
| Zaporozhian Cossacks | Crimean Khanate |

The Battle of Bila Tserkva (Ukrainian: Битва під Білою Церквою, Polish: Bitwa pod Białą Cerkwią: Autumn 1612) was fought between the Zaporozhian Cossacks and Crimean Khanate, with Crimean Tatars returning from the raid with captives. Near the site of the present-day city of Bila Tserkva in Ukraine.

== Prelude ==
In 1612, from summer to autumn, Tatars conducted raids on the lands of Commonwealth, which included Bracław Voivodeship, with the goal of taking captives to Crimea. One of the Tatar chambuls was passing through Kiev Voivodeship near Bila Tserkva, where Cossacks detected them.

== Battle ==
As it turned out, the Tatar chambul that Cossacks encountered was the largest Tatar unit that was on a raid in autumn, returning with captives. Cossacks organized an ambush on the Tatar unit, giving them an advantage of surprise. As the Tatar chambul was passing near Bila Tserkva, they were ambushed by the Cossacks and taken by surprise. In the battle that followed, Cossacks came out victorious and completely defeated the Tatar unit.

== Aftermath ==
As a result of successful ambush and Cossack victory in battle, Cossacks defeated the largest Tatar unit returning from the raid. Cossacks freed 5,000 people from Tatar captivity. Cossack responses like these forced Tatar raiders to be more cautious, and subsequently more hesitant to go on raiding, having a deterring effect. Although this never fully stopped Tatar raids, as the Tatar raiders made another three invasions into Bracław and Galicia in 1613.

== See also ==
- Battle of Bila Tserkva (1626)
