= Fall of Bakhchysarai =

- Part of Crimean Campaign (1675) and Cossack raids
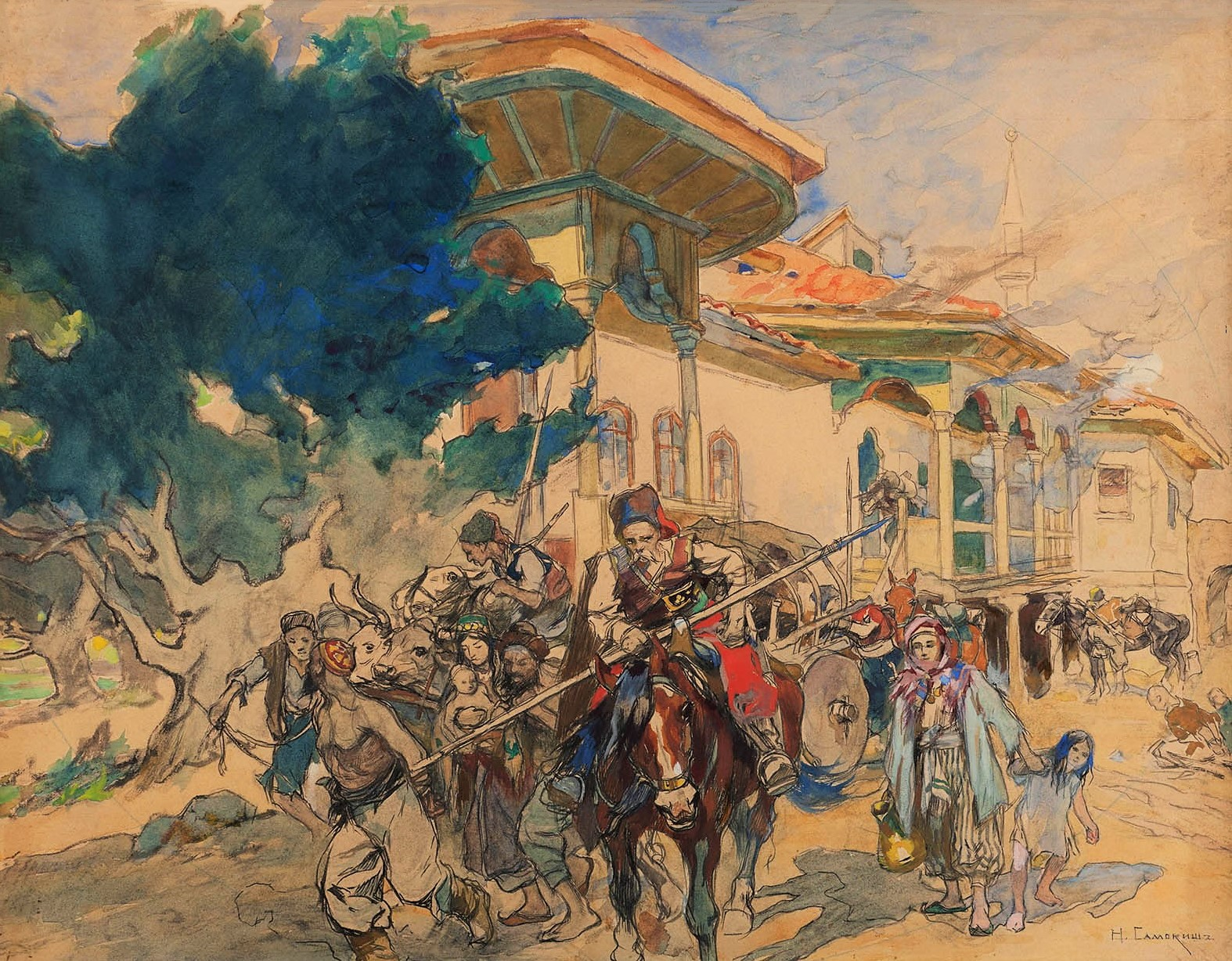
- Zaporozhians in Bakhchysarai by Nikolay Samokish
Date	September 1675
Location	Bakhchysarai, Crimea
Result	Cossack victory
Territorial changes	Destruction of Bakhchysarai

Belligerents
Zaporozhian Cossacks	Crimean Khanate

Commanders and leaders
Ivan Sirko	Selim I Giray

Strength
3,000–4,000	Unknown

The Fall of Bakhchysarai took place during the Crimean Campaign of the Zaporozhian Cossacks and their allies, in September 1675.

== Prelude ==
In September, Ivan Sirko selected 20,000 Cossacks meant to go with him on the expedition into Crimea, as part of his revenge for Tatar attacks. Sirko managed to bypass Perekop through Syvash, allowing him to sneak into Crimean peninsula. After this, Sirko gave an order to plunder Crimea for 5 days, splitting Cossacks into different units which were commanded by their respective commanders. Sirko himself took with him 3,000–4,000 Cossacks. Around half of Sirko's army (10,000 Cossacks) stayed in Perekop after capturing it.

== Capture ==
The Cossack unit heading towards the capital set everything on fire in their path. Sirko wanted Tatars to be punished, ordering Cossacks to massacre the Tatar population. However, Cossacks didn't decline the opportunity of taking captive young and rich, those that can be ransomed. Selim I Giray was in the capital, informed of Cossack plunder in Chufut-Kale, as the Khan was in the capital. The Khan was in rage, but realised he had to flee Bakhchysarai if he were to stand a chance and organise an army.

As the Khan fled, Cossacks approached his palace. Cossacks took the opportunity to enjoy themselves in Khan's palace, before being informed the next of Khan Giray reorganising himself in the mountains and with his army. Cossacks sacked Bakhchysarai and proceeded to leave the capital, heading to Chufut-Kale in order to inform the rest of Cossack army.

== Aftermath ==
Selim I Giray reorganised his army, with his 50,000 troops he headed back to the capital. However, as he returned, the Khan was in shock at the ruins of Bakhchysarai. Khan learnt from captured Cossacks, that the Cossacks and their allies were intending to leave Crimea, along with who led them. Sirko also became aware of Khan's plan from the captured Tatars, which allowed him to lure Tatar army into a trap at Perekop.

Cossacks plundered many cities and villages in Crimea, including the capital. The Khan attempted to ambush the returning Cossack army at Perekop which turned into a battle where Cossacks came out victorious, as the Tatar army was attacked from both directions. The Crimean Campaign concluded with Cossack army and allies leaving Crimea after devastating it.

== Bibliography ==
- Kuŝ, V. Red. (1928). Tabor : voenno-literaturnyj žurnal (in Ukrainian). Vol. 6. Wojenno-Naukowe Wydawnictwo „Do Zbroì”.
