= Battle of Bila Tserkva (1626) =

- Part of Crimean–Nogai slave raids in Eastern Europe
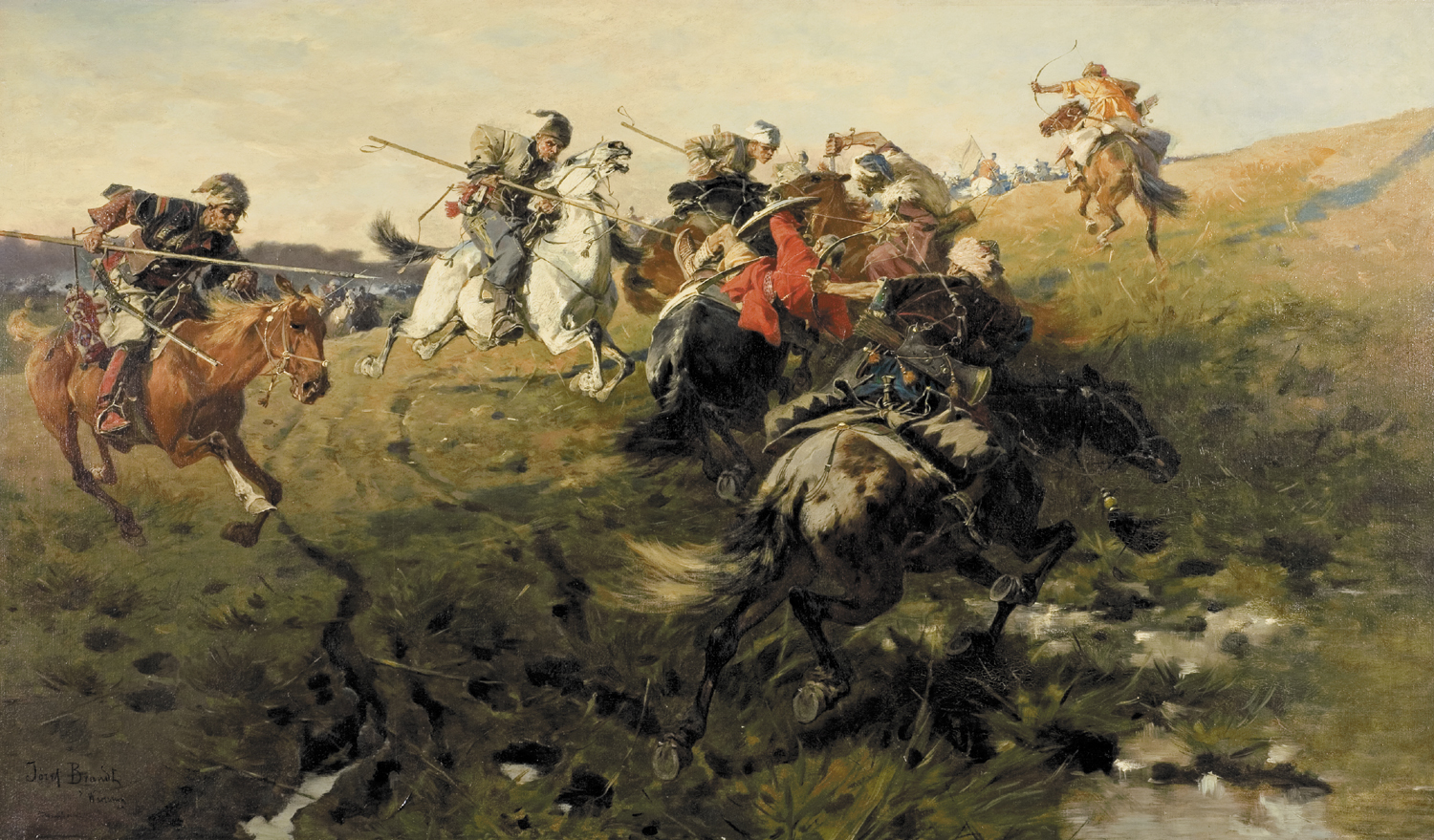
- Józef Brandt-Skirmish of Cossacks and Tatars
Date	9 October 1626
Location	Bila Tserkva
Result	Polish–Lithuanian–Cossack victory

Belligerents
Polish–Lithuanian Commonwealth; Zaporozhian Cossacks	Crimean Khanate

Commanders and leaders
Stefan Chmielecki; Mykhailo Doroshenko	Buhar Kantymirowie

Strength
3,500 soldiers 1,500 Cossacks	10,000–15,000

Casualties and losses
40 killed	1,000 to 4,000+ killed 1,200+ captured (50 Murzas)

Battle of Bila Tserkva was an armed clash between the troops of the Polish–Lithuanian Commonwealth and the Crimean Khanate on October 9, 1626.

== Background ==
Due to the war with Sweden that broke out in Pomerania, Stanisław Koniecpolski with the main forces of the quartian troops moved from Ukraine to the Vistula in the autumn . The defence of the borderlands was handed over to the regiment Stefan Chmielecki, on whose shoulders the entire eastern policy of the Republic of Poland, and above all relations with the Tatars, was to rest for the next five years . Due to the extremely serious situation that had developed in the north, the military forces left at Chmielecki's disposal were relatively small. The King of Sweden, Gustav Adolf, tried to persuade the Tatars to attack Poland not only by letters, but even through envoys. The Protestant ruler of Transylvania, Gabriel Bethlen, who fought against the allied with Sigismund III Vasa House of Habsburg, did the same, remembering well the Polish intervention of 1619 that ended with the Battle of Humenné. However, the Tatars did not need any encouragement to take advantage of the weakening of Polish forces in Ukraine.

== Battle ==
Counting on the fact that after the departure of most of the troops together with Hetman Koniecpolski, the Ukrainian lands remained practically defenseless, the Tatar troops in the strength of 10,000-15,000 thousand Crimean Tatars and Nogai Budyaks, following the Black Trail, invaded the borders of the Republic of Poland at the end of September and set up a basket near Bila Tserkva . The basket was laid out in a muddy area by the Ros River .Soon, the chambuls were disbanded to bring booty and captivity to the basket . Stefan Chmielecki did not waste time and quickly concentrated a force of 5,000 soldiers, including 1,500 registered Cossacks . He immediately attacked the completely surprised enemy, taking all of his booty and inflicting very heavy losses. The fugitives were chased for 4 hours, then turned back to destroy the remaining chambuls, which, unaware of the situation, were still engaged in plundering the area. One or two days later, a detachment of the sołtan Buhar and the sons of Kantymir was defeated near Fastiv . At the same time, Captain Bajbuz defeated a chambul returning with loot at one of the fords. The completely defeated Tatars lost a total of about a thousand dead, as well as several banners and bunchuks . The victors also took many prisoners, losing only 40 dead themselves. Since a civil war broke out in Crimea soon after, the Ukrainian lands were free from Tatar raids for the entire next year.

== See also ==
- Battle of Bila Tserkva (1612)
