= Siege of Perekop =

Siege of Perekop may refer to:

- Siege of Perekop (1689), by Russia, failed; see Crimean campaigns of 1687 and 1689
- Siege of Perekop (1736), by Russia, success
- Siege of Perekop (1771), by Russia, success; see Or Qapi
- Siege of Perekop (1920), by Bolsheviks during Russian Civil War, success
- Siege of Perekop (1941), by Nazi Germany during World War II, success; see LIV Army Corps (Wehrmacht)
- Siege of Perekop (1944), by Soviet Union during World War II, success; see Crimean offensive

== See also ==
- Perekop campaigns (1663)
