= Crimean campaign (1575) =

1575 Cossack invasion of Crimea

- Part of the Cossack raids and Russo-Crimean Wars
Date	September 1575
Location	Crimea
Result	Cossack victory

Belligerents
Zaporozhian Cossacks; Don Cossacks	Crimean Khanate; Nogai Horde

Commanders and leaders
Bohdan Ruzhynsky	Devlet I Giray; Murza Perekopský (executed)

Strength
200+ Unknown	Unknown

Casualties and losses
Unknown	Very heavy
- Thousands of Tatar civilians killed

The Crimean campaign was launched by the Zaporozhian Ataman Bohdan Ruzhynsky jointly with Don Cossacks against the Crimean Khanate, on September 1575.

== Prelude ==
Bohdan Ruzhynsky was elected as Kosh Otaman of the Zaporozhian Sich, responsible for leading Cossacks into battles and campaigns. Ataman Ruzhynsky fought and defeated many Tatars in Podolia region. Ivan IV requested Ataman Ruzhynsky to launch a joint campaign with Don Cossacks into Crimea, which he accepted. Ruzhynsky took advantage of the main Crimean Tatar army of Khan Devlet Giray currently being in Podolia during September, proceeding to launch his campaign. Ruzhynsky wanted to take revenge of Tatars for their attacks, seeing this campaign as a perfect opportunity for doing so.

== Campaign ==
Ataman Ruzhynsky caught the Tatar garrison of Perekop by surprise, defeating them and capturing the city. Seizure of Perekop was accompanied by the massacre of Tatar civilians and looting. Ruzhynsky headed to the residence of Murza Perekopský. Cossacks managed to defeat Tatar troops defending Murza's residence and after the clash captured the Murza, and interrogated him. Afterwards, he ordered Cossacks to impale Murza Perekopský. Ruzhynsky received the news of Tatar attachment which returned from raid on Podolia, now attacking Cossack convoy heading out of Crimea with loot. Ataman ordered to burn Tatar settlements and head to Perekop in order to assist attacked convoy. Cossacks barely defeated the Tatar detachment, freeing captives taken by Tatars. Ruzhynsky made a decision to leave Crimea with loot, due to the risk of being ambushed by Nogais if they went any further into Crimea, while carrying all the loot.

== Aftermath ==
Tatar detachment brought around 50,000 captives with them to Crimea after their raid on Podolia, but these captives were freed after Cossack victory against the returning Tatar detachment. Crimea was devastated, Khan Devlet Giray's property was looted and Tatars suffered heavy losses. Ruzhynsky's campaign was seen as a great success in the Sich. However, Ruzhynsky felt like he only avenged his wife, but not his mother and son, who died in Tatar attacks. Ruzhynsky's desire for revenge drove him to conduct more campaigns against the Crimean Khanate, Nogai Horde and even Ottoman Empire. Ataman Ruzhynsky became popular in European states, including Russia which shared common enemies.

== See also ==
- Battle of Kaffa (1616)
- Crimean campaign (1667)
- Crimean campaign (1675)
