= Tiahynka =

Village in Kherson Oblast, Ukraine

Tiahynka Тягинка
- Village
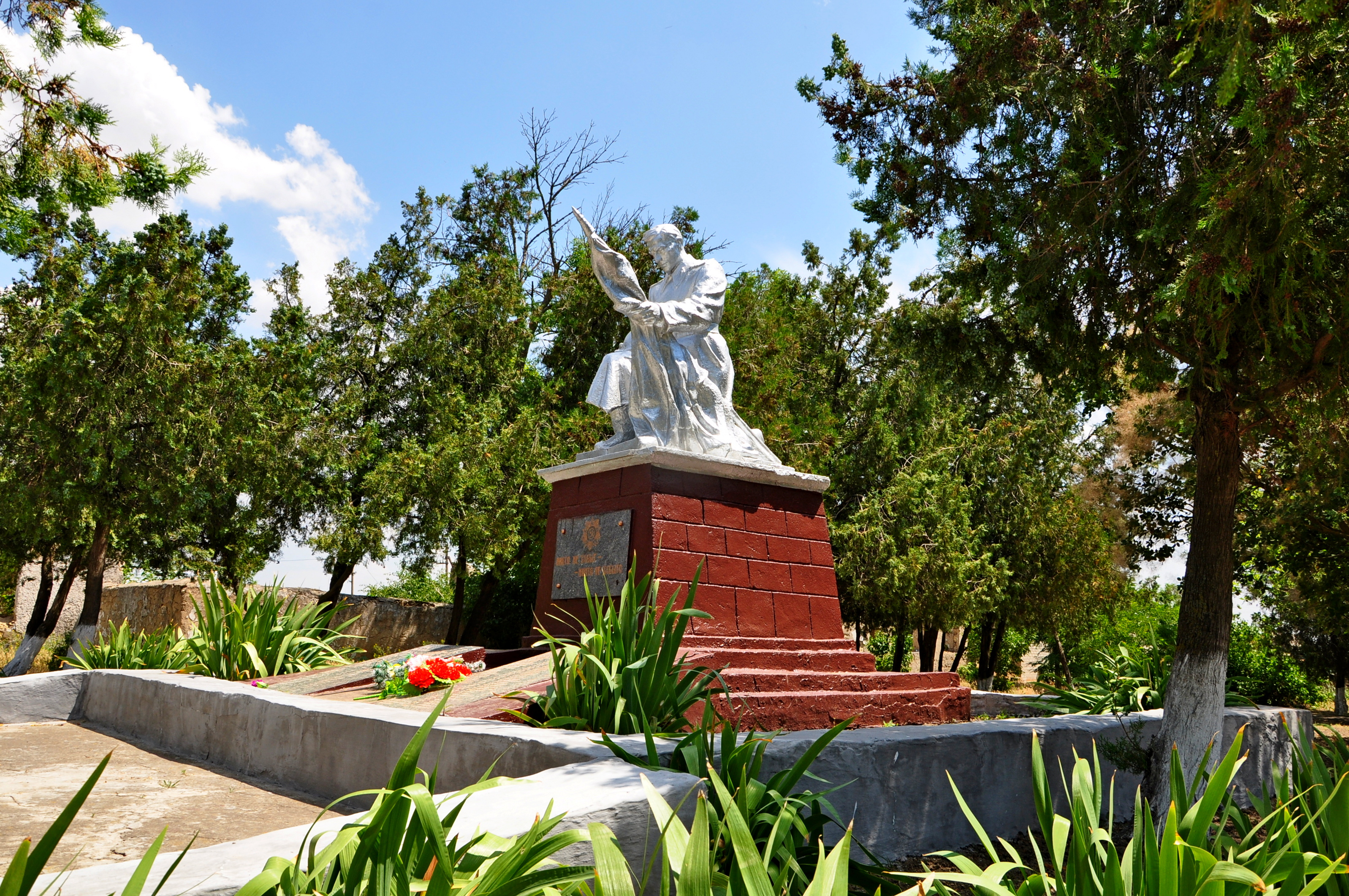
- Holodomor mass grave memorial

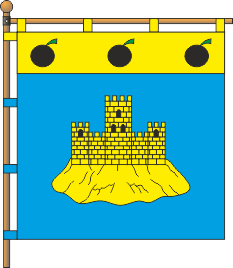
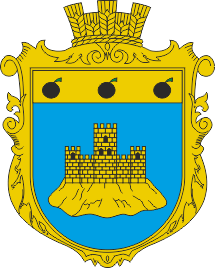
- Flag Coat of arms
- Interactive map of Tiahynka
- Location within Kherson Oblast Location within Ukraine
- Coordinates: 46°46′37″N 33°03′37″E
- Country: Ukraine
- Oblast: Kherson Oblast
- Raion: Beryslav Raion
- Hromada: Tiahynka rural hromada
- Established: 1778

Area
  - Total: 9.9219 km^{2} (3.8309 sq mi)
- Elevation: 17 m (56 ft)

Population (2021)
  - Total: 2,031
  - Density: 204.7/km^{2} (530.2/sq mi)
- Post code: 74330
- Area code: +380 5546
- KATOTTH: UA65020210010059236

Tiahynka (Ukrainian: Тягинка, pronounced [tʲɐˈɦɪnkɐ]) is a village (selo) in Beryslav Raion, Kherson Oblast, southern Ukraine. Tiahynka hosts the administration of the Tiahynka rural hromada, one of the hromadas of Ukraine. In 2024, it had a population of 300.

== History ==
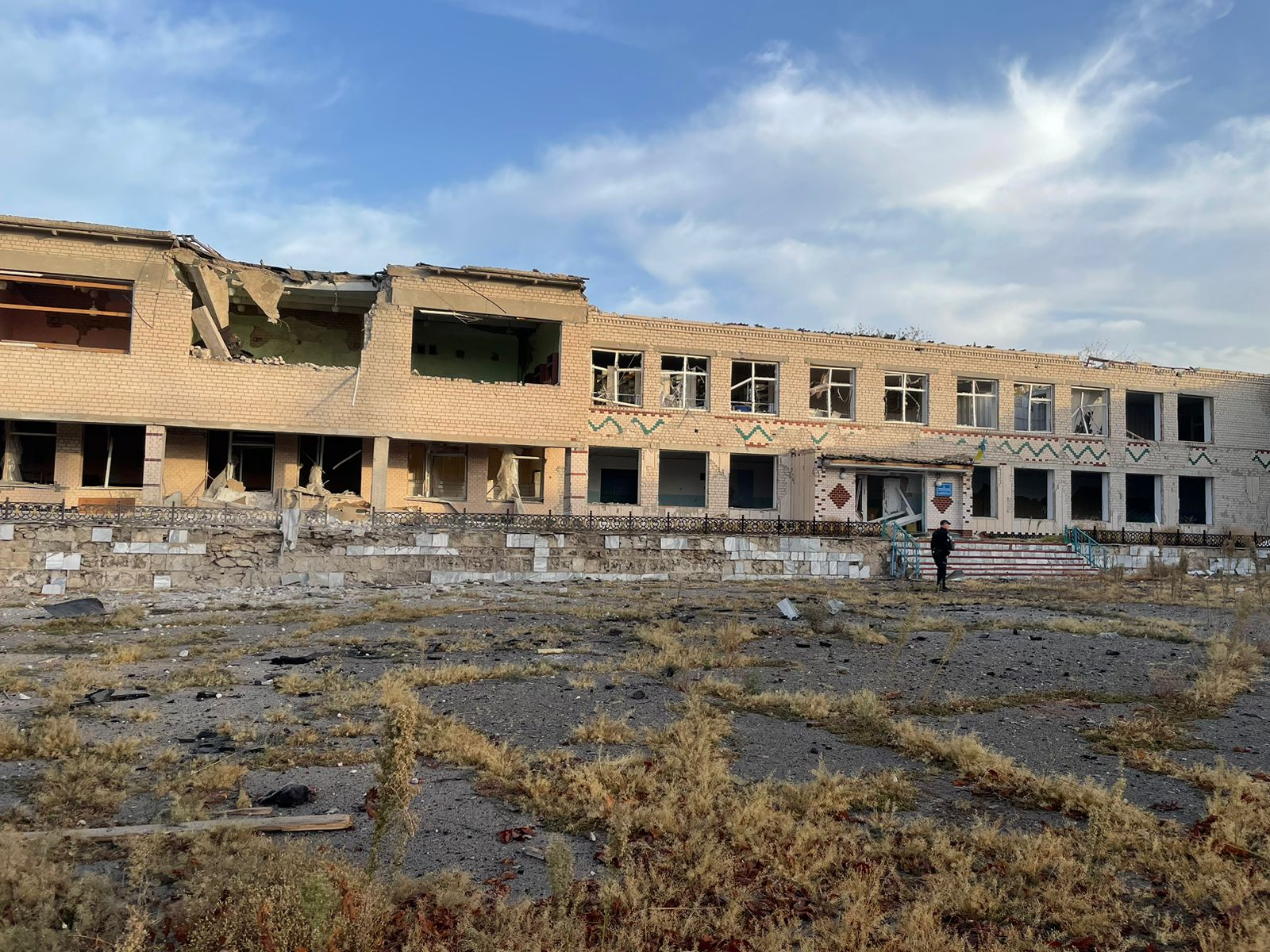
A school after a Russian airstrike, 2023

Since 1781, the St. Nicholas Church has operated in the village. It was renovated in 1807. As of 1886, 1,241 people lived in the village, which contained an Orthodox Church, a loan and savings bank, 5 benches, and an inn.

The village was harmed by the Holodomor, with the National Book of Memory of Ukraine listing 17 named victims. However, there were a total of 124 victims overall within the village, many of whose names are not known.

During the German occupation in World War II, the Germans operated a subcamp of the Dulag 123 transit prisoner-of-war camp in late 1941.

The Russian military detonated a bridge in Tyahynka on 9 November 2022, as part of its withdrawal from the right bank of the Dnieper River. Civilian houses in the village were reportedly hit by Russian shelling in January 2023. In June 2023, the village was reportedly among the settlements partially or completely flooded due to the destruction of the Kakhovka Dam.

== Archaeological findings ==
In 2017, during excavations near the village, archaeologists discovered ruins of a fortress dating back to the Crimean Khanate and a medieval settlement. Among the objects found were Tatar coins, medieval utensils and ceramic objects. Through this, researchers were able to determine the village once lay within the borders of the Grand Duchy of Lithuania during the time of Grand Duke Vytautas.

The artifacts were transferred to the Kherson Local History Museum.

== Gallery ==
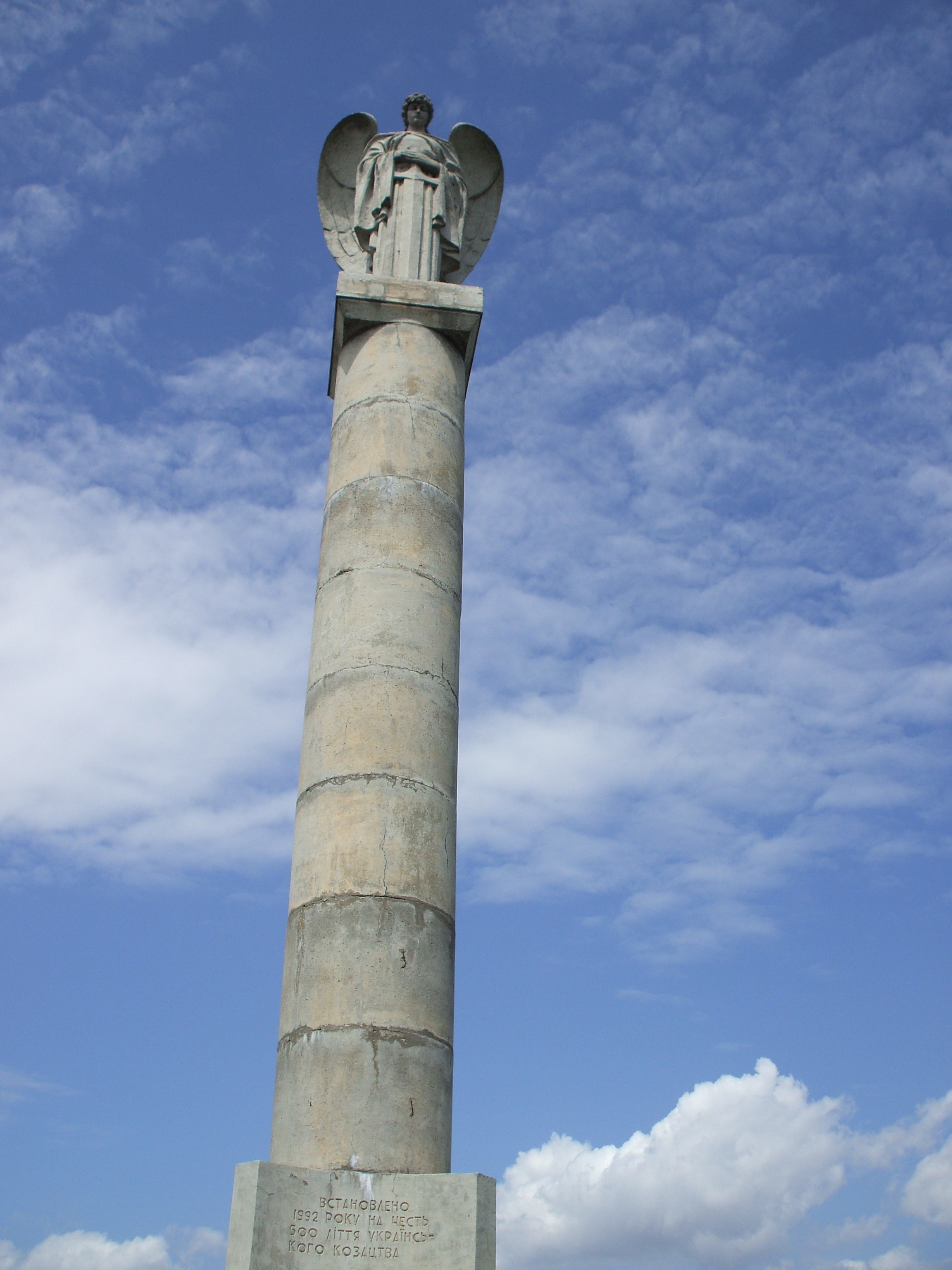
A military monument

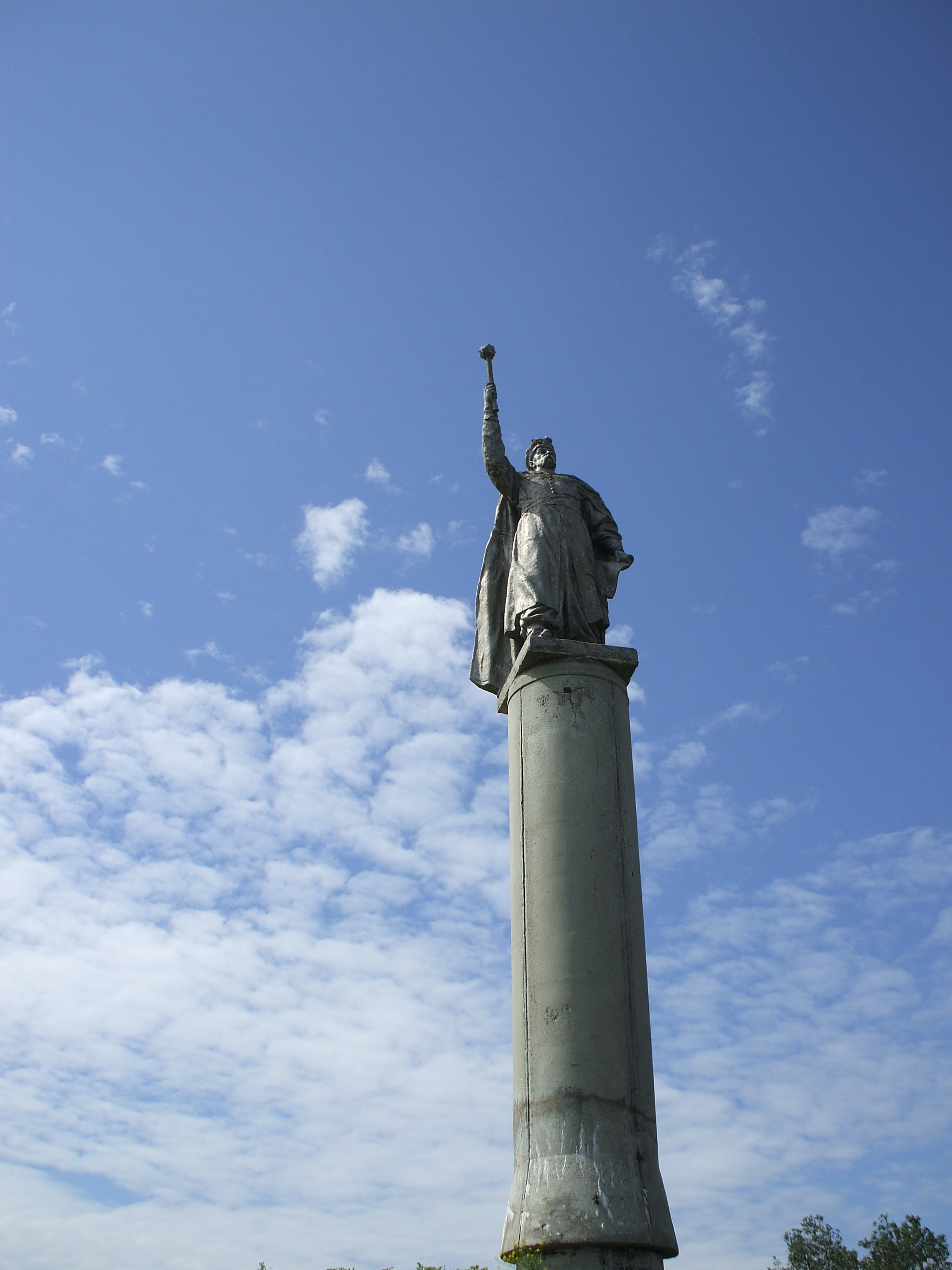
Monument to Bohdan Khmelnytsky

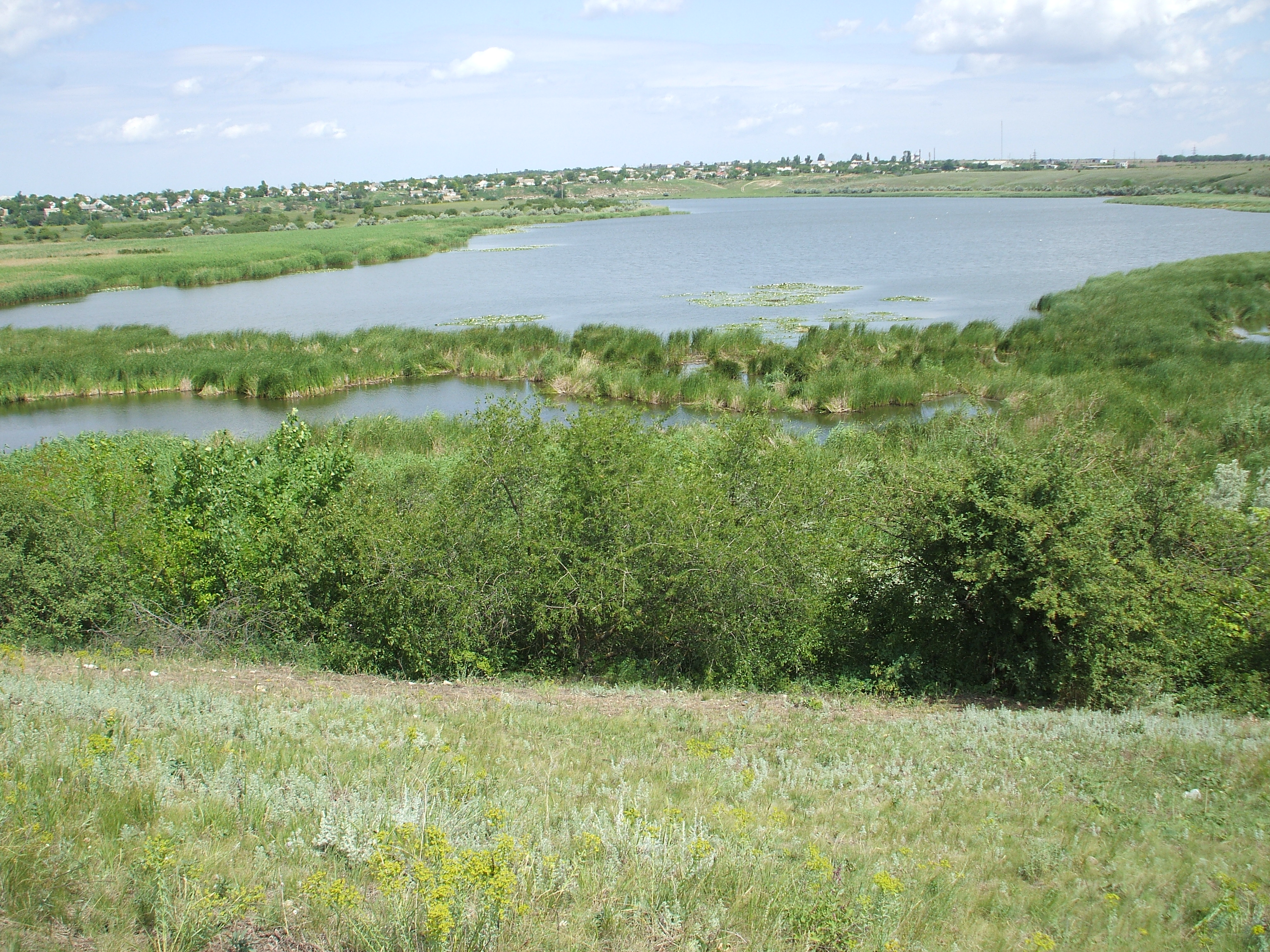
Landscape of the town
