= Battle of Kaffa (1616) =

Cossack naval raid on the Ottomans in Crimea

- Part of the Cossack raids and Cossack naval campaigns
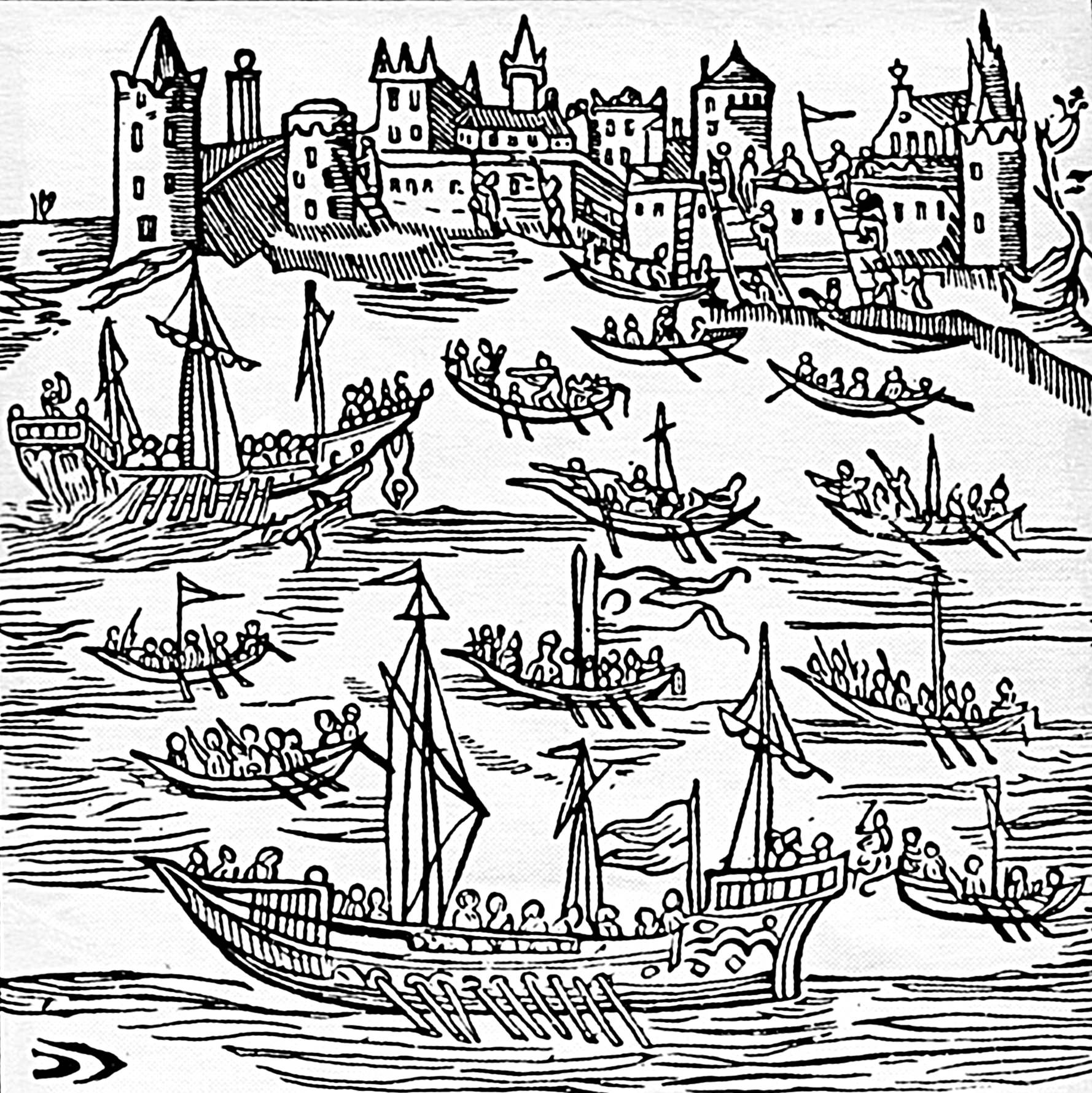
- Contemporary woodcut depicting the attack of Cossack flotilla on Kaffa
| Date | 22 July 1616 |
| Location | Kaffa, Kaffa Eyalet, Ottoman Empire (now Feodosia) 45.02°N 35.40°E |
| Result | Cossack victory |
| Territorial changes | Kaffa captured and looted by the Cossacks |

Belligerents
| Zaporozhian Cossacks | Ottoman Empire; Crimean Khanate |

Commanders and leaders
| Petro Sahaidachny | Unknown |

Strength
| 2,000–4,000; 120–150 boats | (Ottoman Empire) 14,000; Unknown |

Casualties and losses
| Unknown | Entire garrison killed |
- Location within Ukraine

The Battle of Kaffa (Note: Turkish: Kefe Muharebesi Crimean Tatar: Kefe Cenkı Ukrainian: Битва за Кафу) (modern Feodosia) in 1616, was a Cossack naval raid on Crimea and a subsequent battle over the city of Kaffa against the Ottoman garrison, during which Petro Sahaidachny led Zaporizhian Cossacks to victory.

== Background ==
In July 1616, Sahaidachny, together with 6,000 Cossacks on 120–150 Chaikas, set off on a sea expedition. At the exit from the Dnieper, in the Dnieper–Bug estuary, the Cossacks met a squadron of Ottoman galleys. The Cossacks defeated the Turkish flotilla and captured about half of its ships. In order to mislead the Turks about his further actions, Sahaidachny ordered part of the army to defiantly return to the Sich with the captured booty. With the rest of the troops, Sahaidachny remained near Ochakov for about a week. Sahaidachny then split his fleet so 2,000 Cossacks would go home. This would ultimately trick the Ottomans to think that all the Cossacks had left.

== Raid ==
Sahaidachny, together with 4,000 Cossacks, arrived in the city. At night, the Cossacks landed on the shore and approached the gates of Kaffa. Some of the Cossacks, who spoke Turkish, distracted the guards by pointing out that they were a Turkish unit that was heading to war with Persia. Meanwhile, others threw ladders onto the walls of the fortress. Having climbed over the wall, the Cossacks cut out the sentries and opened the gates. The Cossacks captured the city citadel in a surprise attack and began to plunder the city and free Christian slaves. In order to accept more prisoners into their gulls, the Cossacks threw away most of the captured goods, thereby confirming their vow to free Christians from captivity, which they made before their campaigns.

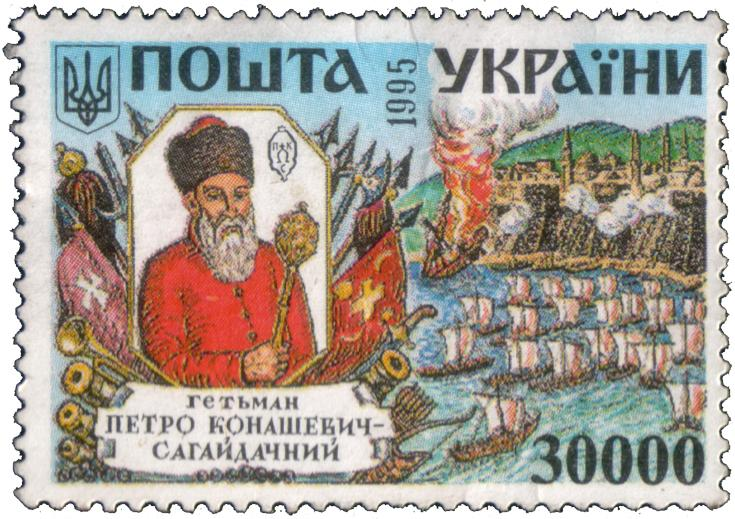
A post stamp of Ukraine showing Petro Sahaidachny and his raid on Kaffa

In foreign, and especially Turkish literature, the campaign is depicted without details, but the event of the raid on Kaffa under the leadership of Sahaidachny is still there.

== See also ==
- Crimean Campaign (1575)
- Crimean Campaign (1667)
- Crimean Campaign (1675)
