= Perekop =

Village in Crimea

Perekop Перекоп Or Qapı
- Village
- Interactive map of Perekop
- Location of Perekop within the Crimea Perekop (Ukraine) Perekop (European Russia) Perekop (Black Sea)
- Coordinates: 46°9′42″N 33°41′34″E
- Republic: Crimea
- Region: Armiansk municipality

Government
  - Mayor: Roman Vasylovych Bezvuhlyak
- Elevation: 5 m (16 ft)

Population (2015)
  - Total: 919
- Time zone: UTC+4 (MSK)
- Postal code: 96011
- Area code: +380-6567
- Former names: Or Qapı, Taphros
- Climate: Cfa

Perekop (Ukrainian & Russian: Перекоп; Crimean Tatar: Or Qapı; Greek: Τάφρος and Τάφραι and Τάφρη) is a village located on the Perekop Isthmus connecting the Crimean peninsula to the Ukrainian mainland. It is known for the Or Qapi fortress, which served as the gateway to Crimea. The village currently is part of Armiansk Municipality. Population: 919 (2014 Census).

== Name ==
The original name was of the Greek settlement of Taphros (Ancient Greek: Τάφρος) which means a dug-out locality. The people were called Taphrians (Ancient Greek: Τάφριοι)

Thereafter it was known by the equivalent name of Or Qapı in the Crimean Tatar language meaning Or - trench and Qapı - gate. In the Middle Ages, Perekop was known as Tuzla. Subsequently, it was known as Perekop in the Slavic languages, which literally means an over-dug locality.

== History ==
Due to its key position, Perekop has endured many sieges.

During the Russo-Turkish War (1735–1739), Russian field marshal Burkhard Christoph von Munnich successfully stormed the fortifications on June 17, 1736 and left the Tatar fortress in ruins. This was a serious, if not mortal, blow to the independence of the Crimean Khanate.

The town was virtually wiped out during the Siege of Perekop by the Red Army in 1920. The siege was a key episode of the Russian Civil War. The success of the Bolsheviks allowed them to oust Pyotr Wrangel's White Army from the Crimea. Twelve years later, the Soviets founded the new town of Krasnoperekopsk 32 km (20 mi) to the south.

During World War II, Perekop was occupied by the German Army from September 27, 1941 to November 1, 1943. The capture of Perekop (by both the Wehrmacht in 1941 and the Red Army in 1943) was used to cut off Crimea from Ukraine.

== Demographics ==
As of the 2001 Ukrainian census, the village had a population of 894. The linguistic composition was as follows:

First languages in Perekop
	percent
Russian	48.9%
Ukrainian	25.8%
Crimean Tatar	22.7%
Romanian	1.3%
Belarusian	0.7%
others	0.4%
