= Arbautuk massacre =

- Part of the Crimean Campaign (1667)
- Location: Arbautuk, Crimea
- Date: October 1667
- Target: Crimean Tatars
- Attack type: Massacre, slavery, looting
- Deaths: Thousands (Note: Including during entire Crimean Campaign (1667).)
- Victim: All inhabitants killed or enslaved
- Perpetrators: Zaporozhian Cossacks, Ivan Zhdan-Rih, Ivan Sirko
- Motive: Retaliation for the Crimean-Nogai raids, Tatarophobia, Islamophobia

The Arbautuk massacre or Arabat massacre took place during the Crimean Campaign of Cossack leaders Ivan Zhdan-Rih and Ivan Sirko, when Zhdan-Rih with 2,000 captured the city and subsequently sacking it, targeting Tatar civilians.

== Prelude ==
In October, 1667, Kosh Otaman (Ivan Zhdan-Rih) and Cossack colonel Ivan Sirko organised a campaign into Crimea, taking this as an opportunity to devastate Crimea while the main Tatar army was busy assisting Petro Doroshenko in his war against the Commonwealth. Cossacks captured Perekop. Cossacks split into two detachments, Sirko headed for the city of Kaffa while Zhdan-Rig headed for Arbautuk with his 2,000 Cossacks.

=== Motive ===
Ivan Sirko promised during his speech to the Cossacks on taking revenge on Tatars for their raids and his hostile sentiment towards Crimean Tatars. Sirko, and Cossacks in general, were staunchly anti-Muslim, believing that killing "busurmans" will grant them entrance to heaven.

== Massacre ==
Zhdan-Rog and his Cossacks approached the city of Arbautuk. Cossacks took the entirety of Crimea by surprise and forced Khan to flee the capital, which made the capture of the city easy for Ataman Zhdan-Rig. Zhdan-Rog on the way to Arbautuk ravaged various settlements and killed many Tatars.

Zhdan-Rig with his Cossacks had taken Arbautuk by storm, which they plundered and where they "exterminated everyone". As a result, Zhdan-Rig with his Cossacks then headed to other nearby areas where "many villages and settlements were burned and razed and people were hanged". Ivan Sirko done the same in the city of Kaffa, where he plundered the property of Tatar lord Shirin Bey, capturing his 7-year-old son, mother and uncle.

== Aftermath ==
During the entire campaign, Cossacks exterminated thousands of Tatars. Sirko massacred 2,000 Tatar men in Kaffa and took 1,500 Tatar women and children captive. Having reunited with Zhdan-Rog's detachment, they had 3,500 Tatar captives in total and intended to return to the Sich. On the way back, they encountered a large Tatar army that the Khan had reunited, but after 2 days and 2 nights of fighting Cossacks won the battle. After this, Cossacks massacred 2,000 of their captives consisting of "strong and old" Tatar men before reaching Sich.
