= Holy Trinity Church, Pidhaitsi =

Church in Pidhaitsi, Ukraine

Holy Trinity Church
- Костел Пресвятої Трійці
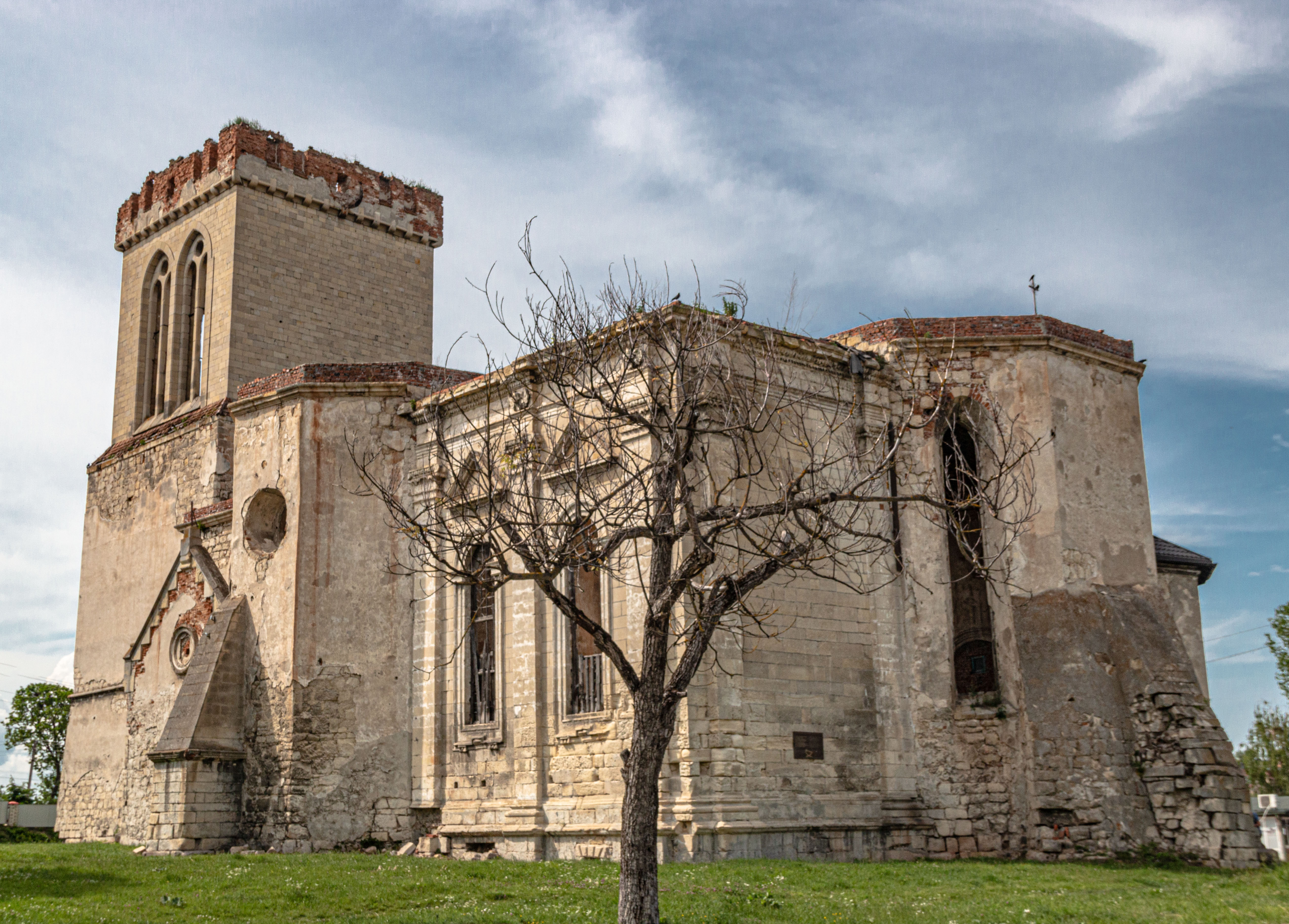

- Location within Ternopil Oblast

Location
- Location: Pidhaitsi
- Coordinates: 49°16′11″N 25°08′28″E

Immovable Monument of National Significance of Ukraine
- Official name: Костел (мур.) (Church (stone))
- Type: Architecture
- Reference no.: 190042

Holy Trinity Church (Ukrainian: Костел Пресвятої Трійці) is a historic Gothic-Renaissance Roman Catholic church in Pidhaitsi. It is located on the eastern edge of the city, near the Koropets River and the intersection of roads from Terebovlia and Monastyryska. It is an architectural monument of national significance.

== Description, architecture ==
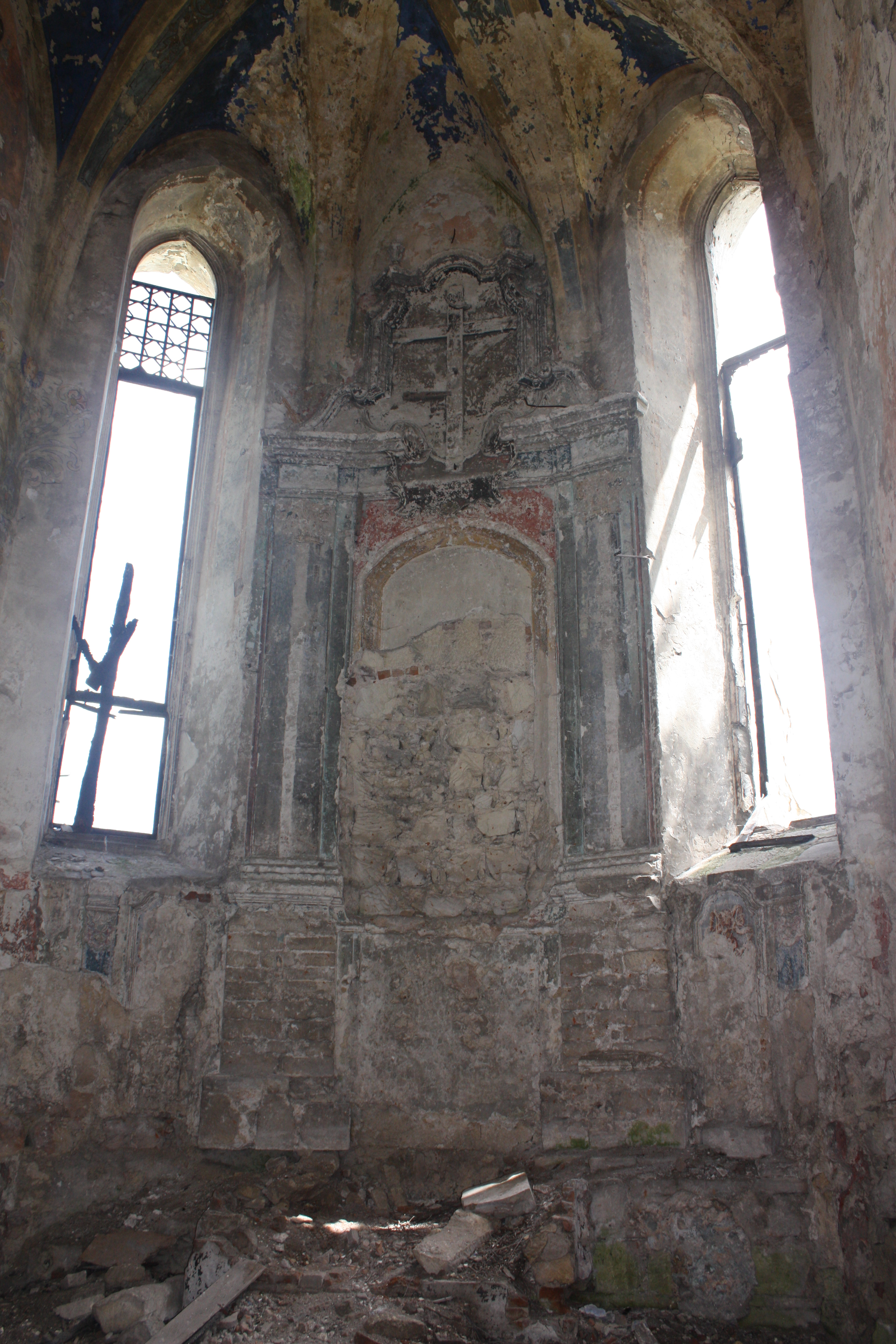
Stucco retable in the presbytery behind the altar. Condition in 2010.

The church is built of stone blocks with herringbone-patterned faces. The building has a single nave, a tower, and side chapels, one of which adjoins the polygonal chancel. The entrance to the temple leads through a blind portico portal with acanthus leaf ornamentation. The church is situated on a cross plan, with a three-bay nave (covered with a rib vault), a narrower, also three-bay chancel and single-bay transept arms. The chancel is closed on three sides, and the transept arms are pentagonal, with an irregular outline. From the west, the nave is preceded by a massive square tower (covered with a tent roof), with a porch on the ground floor; from the south, a rectangular vestibule adjoins the nave. On the north side of the presbytery, there is a rectangular annex, closed on the east side by a fragment of an irregular polygon; in its eastern part, it houses the former burial chapel of Zofia of Zamiechów, and in its western part, an almost square sacristy with a treasury on the first floor, accessible by stairs in the thickness of the wall. Steps also lead from the sacristy to the pulpit. On the southern side of the presbytery, there is a rectangular, two-bay Potocki chapel dedicated to St. Nicholas. Crypts are located under the northern arm of the transept and under the chapels of Zofia of Zamiechów and the Potocki family. Inside, rectangular pillars on high pedestals supporting fragments of entablature are attached to the walls of the nave, shaped like pairs of pseudo-pilasters at the front. On similar pillars with pseudo-pilasters, slightly pointed arcades between the cross bay and the presbytery and transept arms are supported. The vaults in the nave and cross vault are cross-ribbed, with an almost semicircular profile, ribs with a concave-convex profile, and keystones in the shape of grape clusters.

The dome of the lantern above the renovated chapel of Zofia of Zamiechów, shaped like a pointed dome and covered with sheet metal.

The architecture of Zofia Zamiechów mausoleum in the Holy Trinity Church in Pidhaitsi has parallels in Wojciech Humiecki mausoleum at the Dominican church in Kamianets-Podilskyi and the castle chapel in Berezhany.

== History ==
The history of the church in Pidhaitsi is very complex. The original foundation of the church and parish of Pidhaitsi was made by Michał Buczacki (voivode of Podolia and starost of Przemyśl). The foundation privilege was soon lost and the parish fell into decline. In 1463, the foundation was renewed by Jakub Buczacki, Michał's son. In 1490, the foundation was expanded by the aforementioned Jakub Buczacki and Jan Skarbek, Stanisław son. The oldest church in Pidhaitsi, founded by Michał Buczacki, was most likely located in the village of Stare Misto, slightly east of today's Pidhaitsi. After the Tatar invasion, Jakub Buczacki moved the ruined town to its current location.

Initially (from 1593), the parish in Pidhaitsi belonged to the Dunajec deanery, before 1615 it was transferred to the Terebovlia deanery, and as a result of the administrative reform of the Archdiocese of Lviv in 1765, it became part of the newly created Kąkolnica deanery. At the end of the 19th century, the Pidhaitsi parish included: Bekersdorf (Bekierów), Białokrynica, Bożyków, Gniłowody, Holendry, Justynówka, Mądzelówka, Michałówka, Mużyłów, Nowosiółka, Siółko, Staremiasto, Uhrynów, Wierzbów, and Zahajce. Finally, in 1905, Metropolitan Józef Bilczewski established the new Pidhaitsi deanery.

In the last months of 1620 or 1621, the church was destroyed to such an extent (as a result of the Turkish-Tatar invasion) that Zofia of Zamiechów, then Tyszkiewiczowa, the voivode of Troki, could write that she had founded "a new church from scratch". Zofia had a large fortune at her disposal at the time, most likely appropriated from the Potocki family, who, setting off on a military expedition in 1612, had deposited a huge sum of money in Pidhaitsi. Jan Golski, Zofia's husband, refused to return the deposit after the death of his brother (who had accepted the valuables), denying its existence. The Potocki family brought a lawsuit, but Jan Golski soon died and Zofia managed to defend herself against the Potocki family's demands for the return of the treasure. The treasure included 70,000 gold coins, gold chains, rings, and silver tableware. Historians believe that Zofia donated part of this fortune to the construction of a church. In her will, drawn up at Pidhaitsi Castle, Zofia expressed her wish that her body be buried in the church in Pidhaitsi, which she "built herself without any worldly pomp". The building was constructed of sandstone in the Renaissance style with elements of the Gothic style (post-Gothic). In 1643, a polygonal burial chapel was added to the presbytery of the temple, in which Stanisław Rewera Potocki, the next owner of Pidhaitsi after Tyszkiewiczowa, was buried.

Inside the temple, there were several commemorative plaques – the most important one commemorated the signing of a peace treaty with the Turks between King John III Sobieski and the Cossacks and Tatars in the temple.

In the interwar period, Pidhaitsi was the seat of a Roman Catholic deanery. The church was taken away from the parish and gradually fell into ruin after 1945. From 1946, the church building was converted into a warehouse for various materials. In the 1970s, there were plans to blow it up, but this did not happen in the end. In the 1980s, it was set on fire, resulting in the collapse of the entire vault and tower. The parish community was registered in 1991 and has been seeking the return of the temple ever since. This took place in the summer of 2006. In the same year, the then parish priest of Berezhany, Andrzej Zając, began renovation work. He converted the sacristy into a temporary chapel. On 24 September, Bishop Marian Buczek celebrated Holy Mass in the Holy Trinity Church in Pidhaitsi, Ternopil Oblast. It was the first Holy Mass celebrated in this church after the war. Before 2009, only the tomb chapel of Rewera Potocki had been secured and adapted for liturgical use.

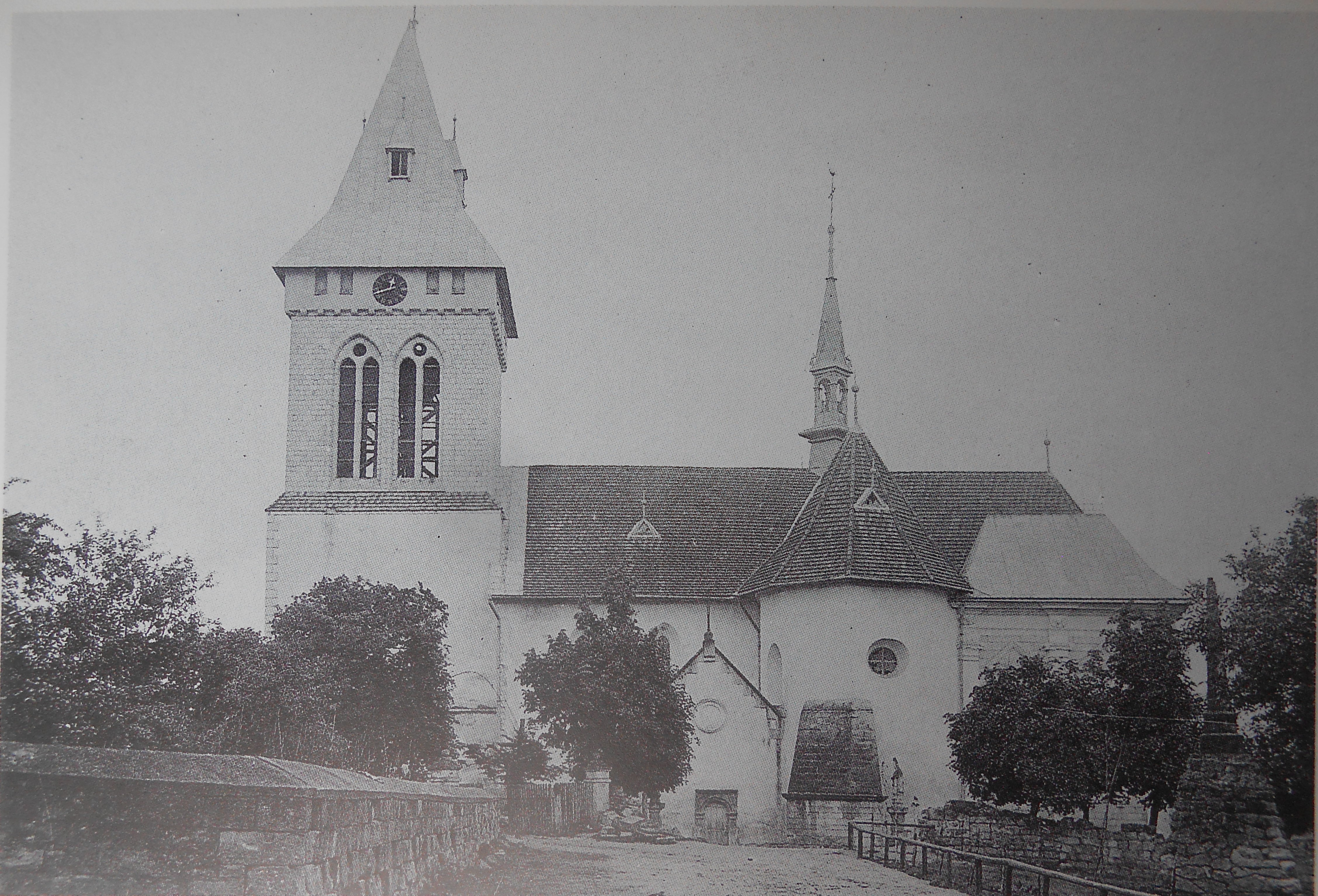
The church in 1924.

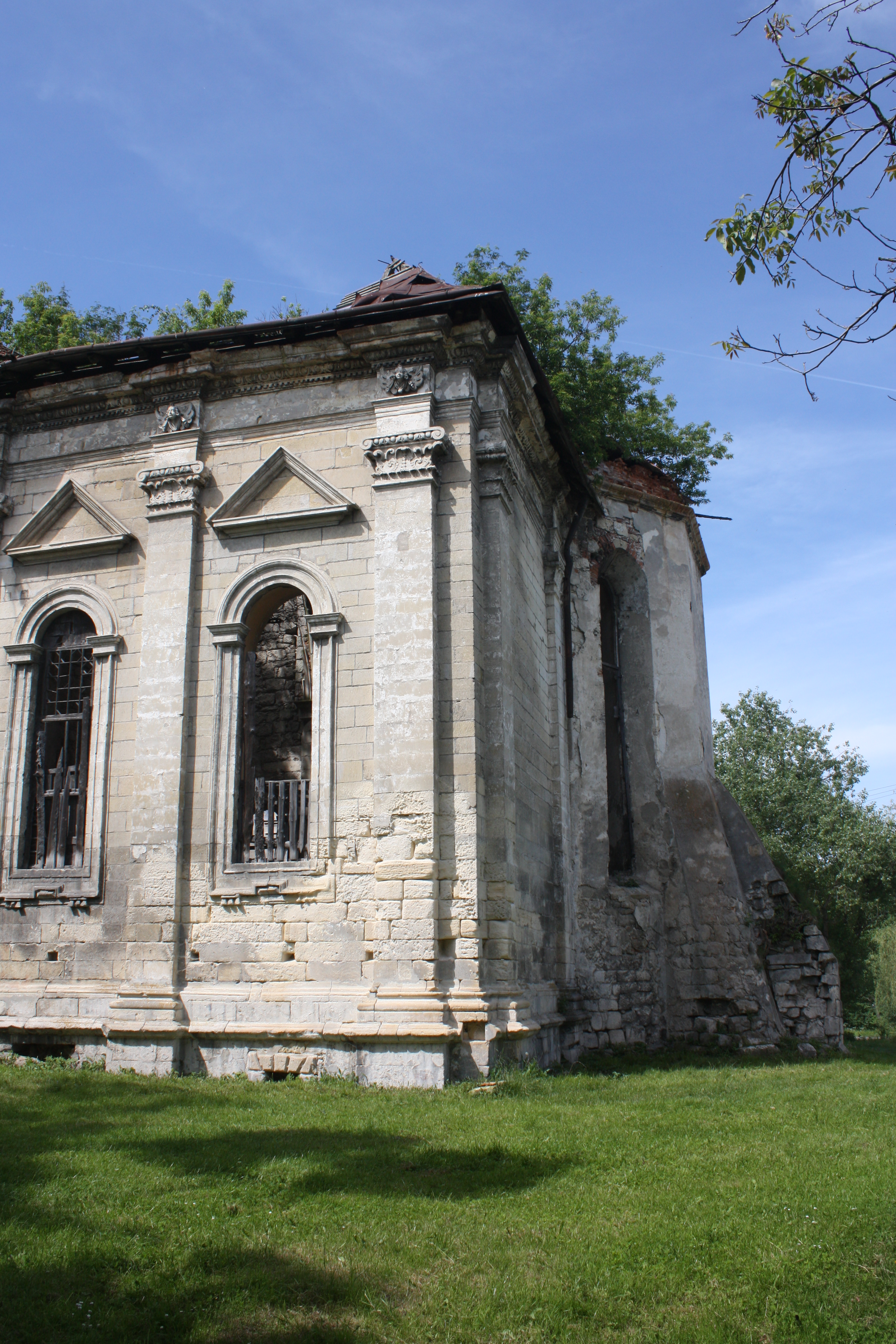
The Potocki Chapel (2010)

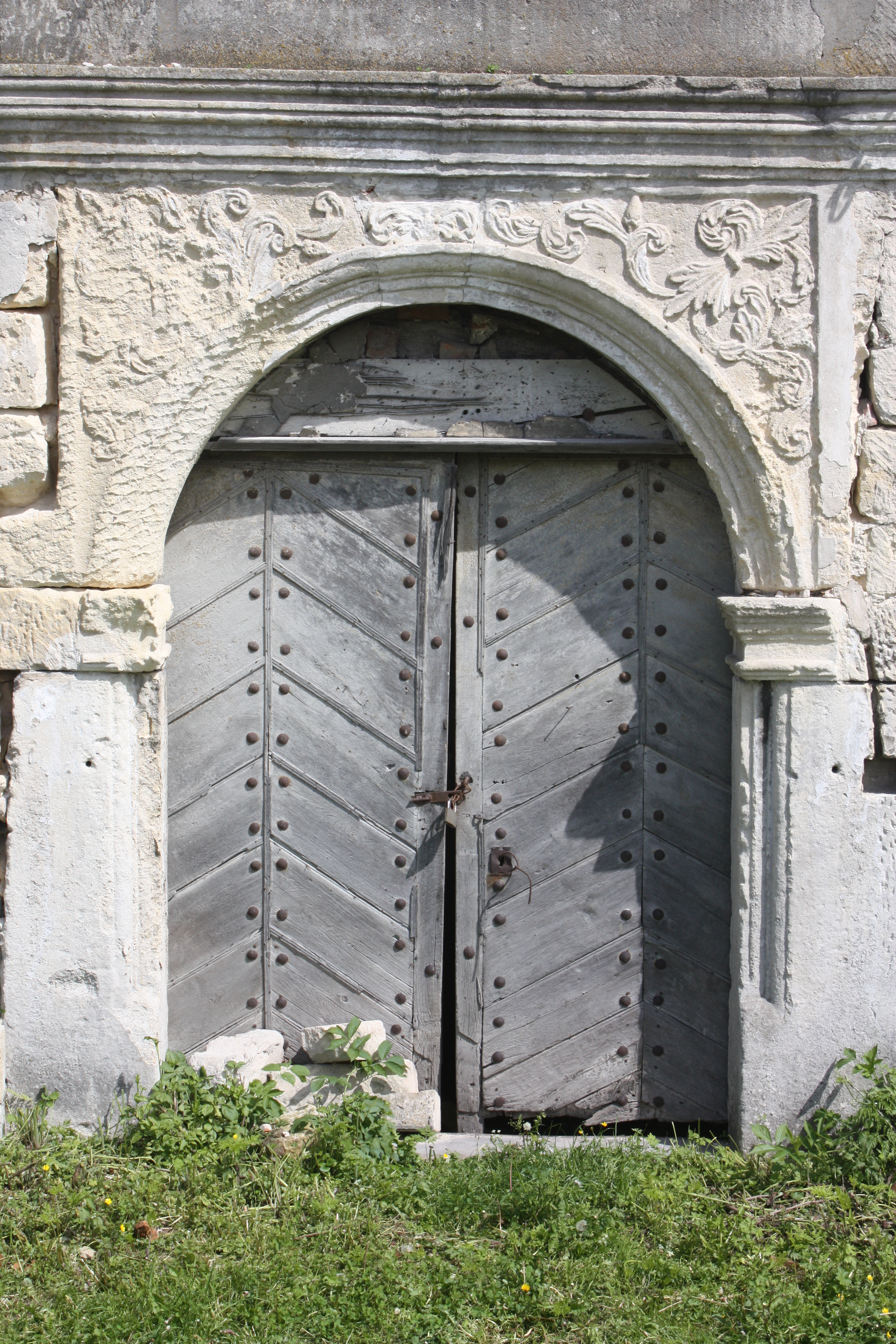
Acanthus leaves on the ornament on the main portal (2010)

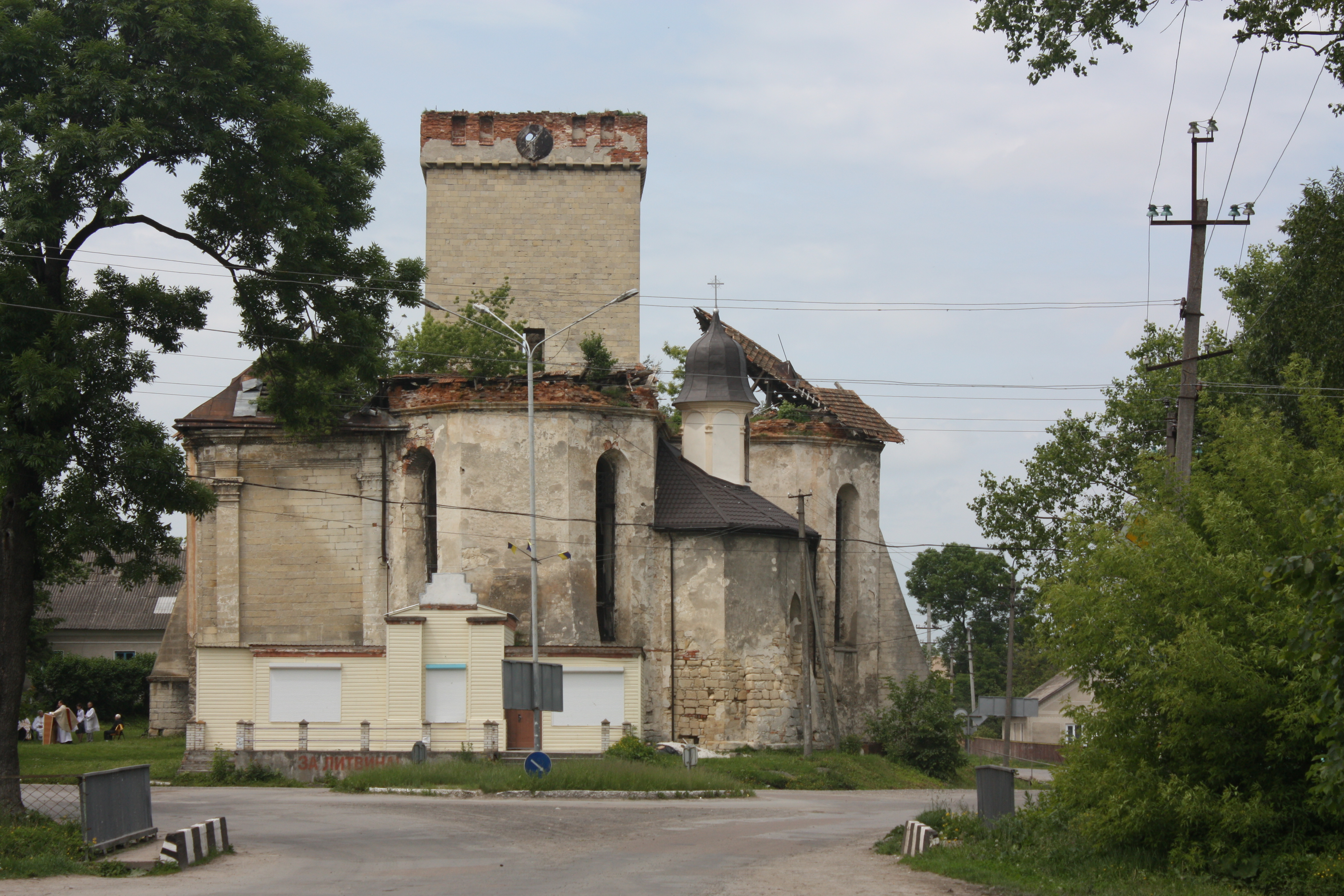
View from the east (2010)

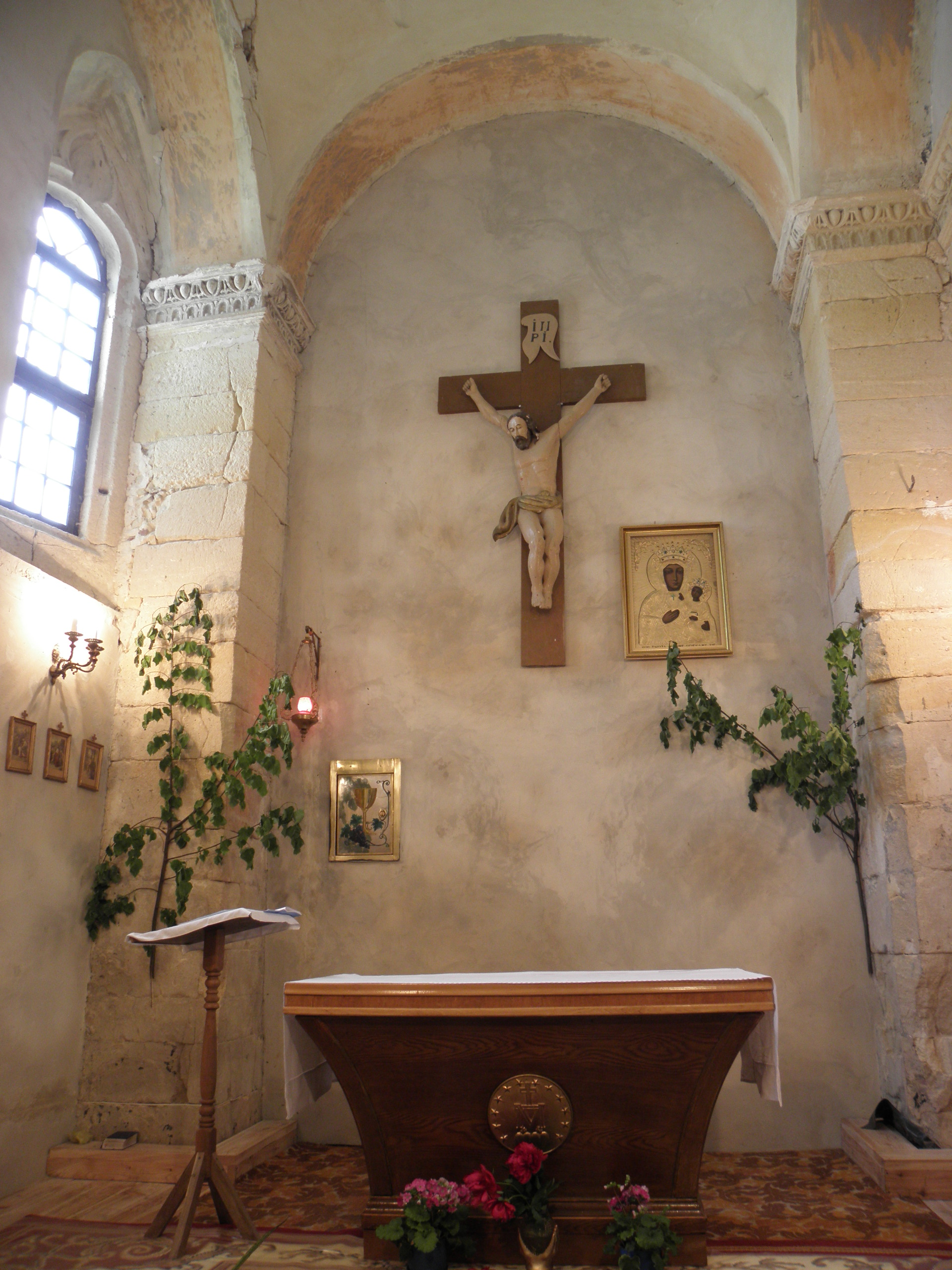
Interior of the renovated chapel of Zofia of Zamiechów (2010)

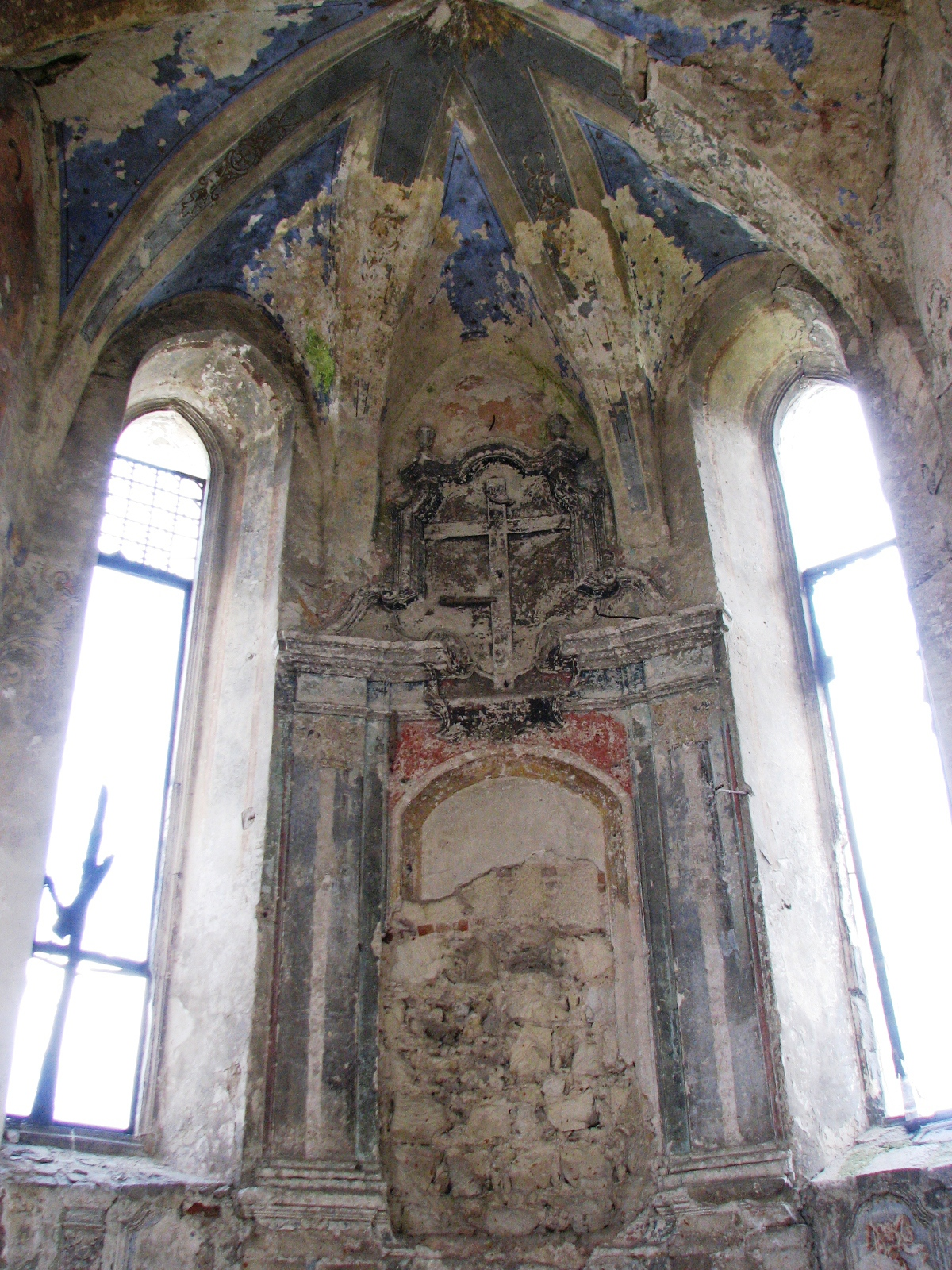

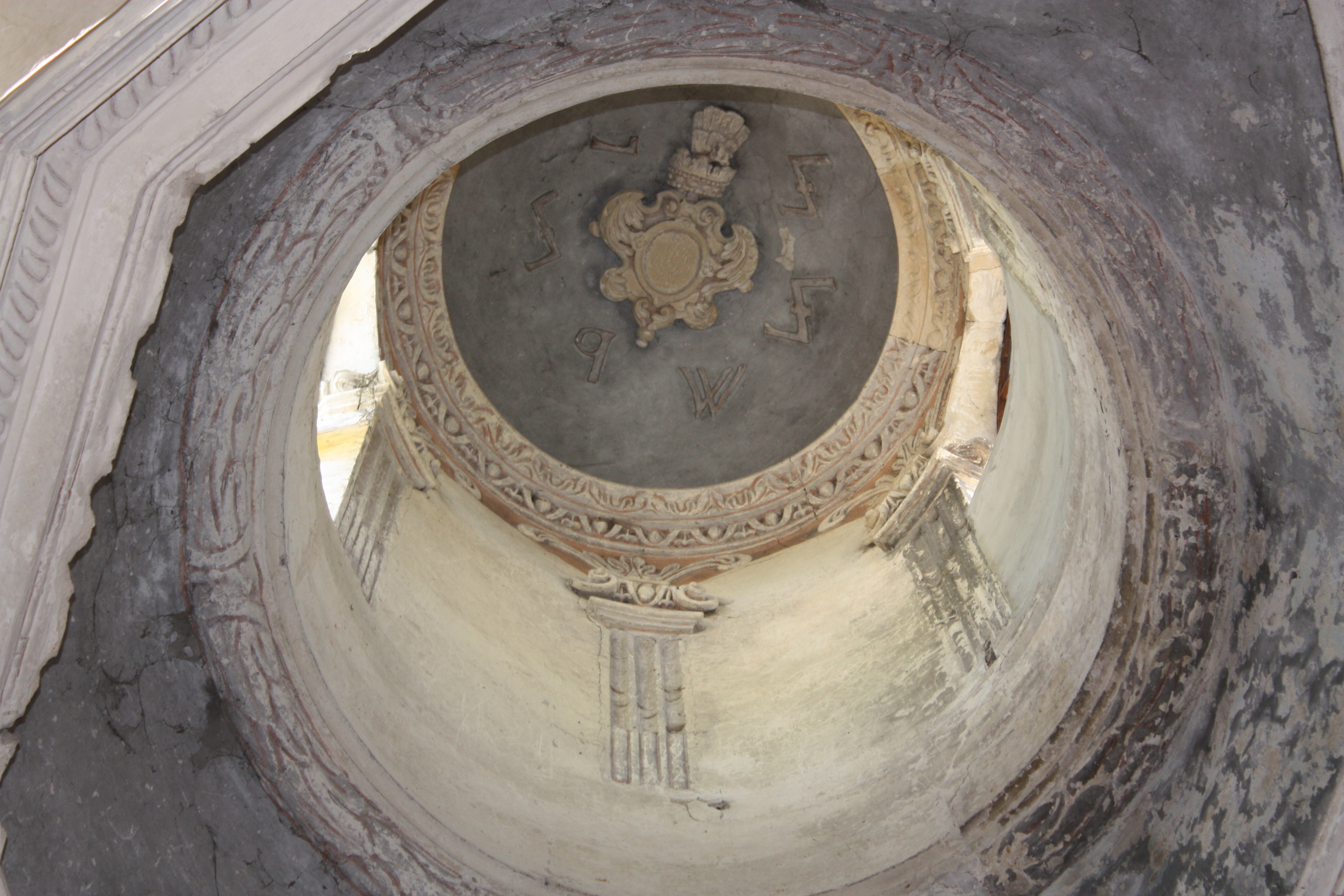
The dome in the chapel of Zofia of Zamiechów (2010)

== Bibliography ==
- Jan K. Ostrowski, Kościół parafialny p.w. Św. Trójcy w Podhajcach [w:] Kościoły i klasztory rzymskokatolickie dawnego województwa ruskiego, Praca zbiorowa, Kraków: Międzynarodowe Centrum Kultury, Drukarnia narodowa 1996, tom 4, 211 s., 402 il. seria: Materiały do dziejów sztuki sakralnej na ziemiach wschodnich dawnej Rzeczypospolitej. cz. I. ISBN 83-85739-34-3.
