= Great Synagogue (Pidhaitsi) =

Former synagogue in Pidhaitsi, Ukraine

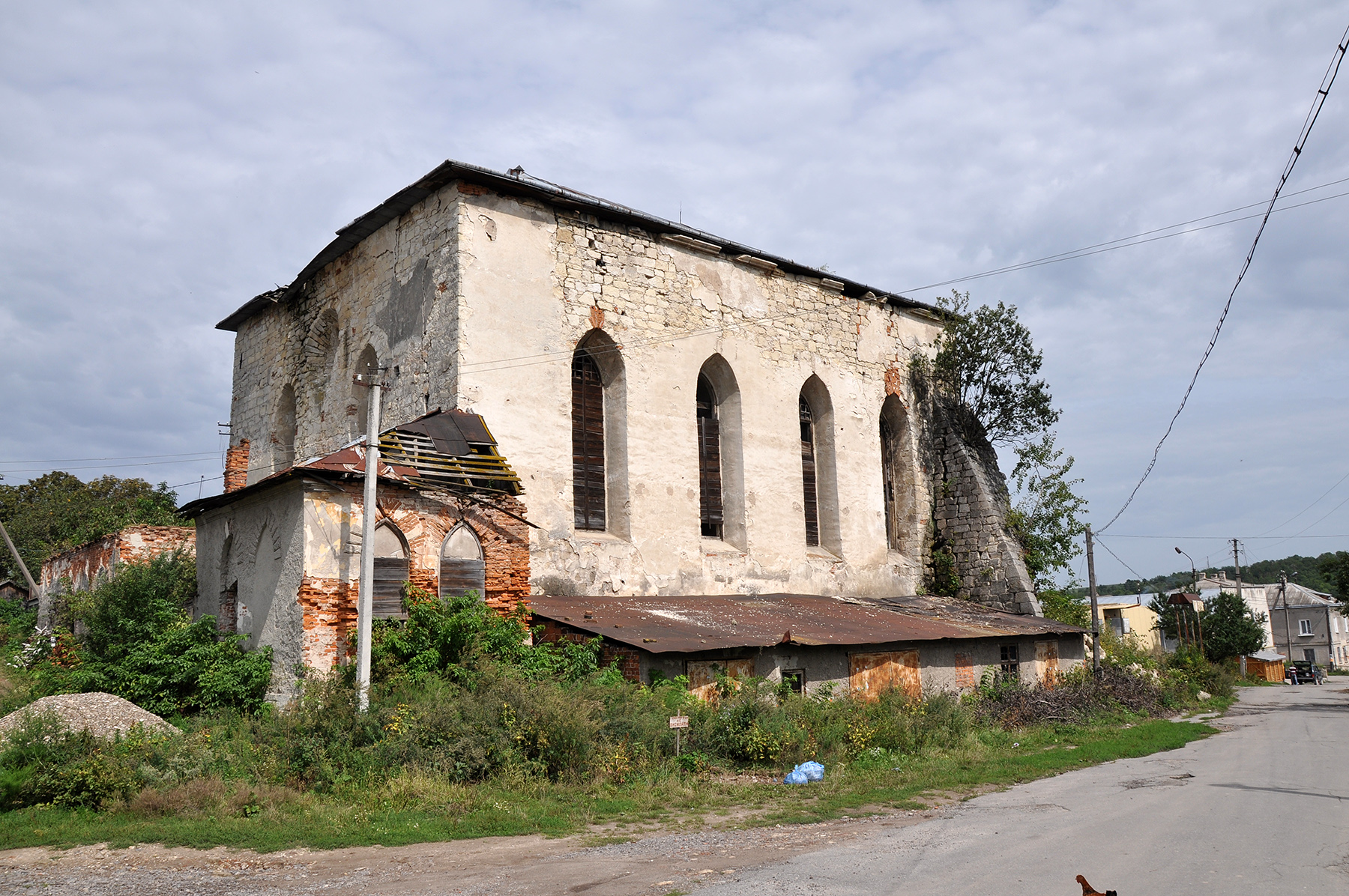
- The former synagogue, in 2012

- Location of the former synagogue in Ukraine

Religion
- Affiliation: Judaism (former)
- Rite: Nusach Ashkenaz
- Ecclesiastical or organisational status: Synagogue (c. 1648–1939)
- Status: Abandoned

Location
- Location: Lesya Ukrainka Street, Pidhaitsi, Ternopil Oblast
- Country: Ukraine
- Coordinates: 49°16′04″N 25°08′07″E

Architecture
- Style: Gothic architecture
- Completed: c. 1648
- Demolished: 2019
- Materials: Stone

Immovable Monument of National Significance of Ukraine
- Official name: Синагога (мур.) (Synagogue (stone))
- Type: Architecture
- Reference no.: 190043

The Great Synagogue is a former Jewish synagogue, located in Pidhaitsi, Ternopil Oblast in Ukraine. The congregation worshipped in the Ashkenazi rite. Built prior to 1648, the fortress synagogue was abandoned during World War II, was used for grain storage thereafter, then as a ruin.

== History ==
The first mention of a synagogue in Pidhaitsi was dated from 1552.

The synagogue was built as a fortress synagogue, completed between 1621 and 1648. Over the years annexes were added.

Following Soviet occupation in 1939, the German Nazis demolished much of the interior of the synagogue on 4 July 1941 and the Germans segregated approximately 5,000 Jews in a ghetto. During the Holocaust, the local Jewish community perished. Afterwards the building was used as a storehouse for several years. The building has stood empty and is in a ruinous state. It experienced a partial collapse in 2019.

== Architecture ==
Completed in the Gothic style, the exterior of the main building (the men's prayer hall) is nearly square (30.6 by 30.4 metres (100 ft × 100 ft)). It is surrounded by one- and two storeyed extensions. The northern and western extensions were already built in the 17th century, while the ones to the south and to the east were added after 1945 when the building was used as a storehouse.

From the eastern side the main volume was supported by two buttresses.

With its high windows and pointed arches and limestone framings the building bears features of Gothic architecture.

The niche of the Holy Ark was badly damaged and the Bimah was missing. In 2023 it was reported that artefacts and relics from the former synagogue, believed to be stolen in 2014, had appeared in the Museum of the History of Jews, in Moscow, Russia.

== Synagogue in New York ==
In 1926 Jewish emigrants from Podhajce (Pidhaitsi) bought a building in New York and consecrated it as their synagogue. It was called the Podhajcer Shul. Nowadays it is a private residence.

== See also ==
- History of the Jews in Ukraine
- List of synagogues in Ukraine
