= Arabat Fortress =

Fortress in Ukraine

- Crimea
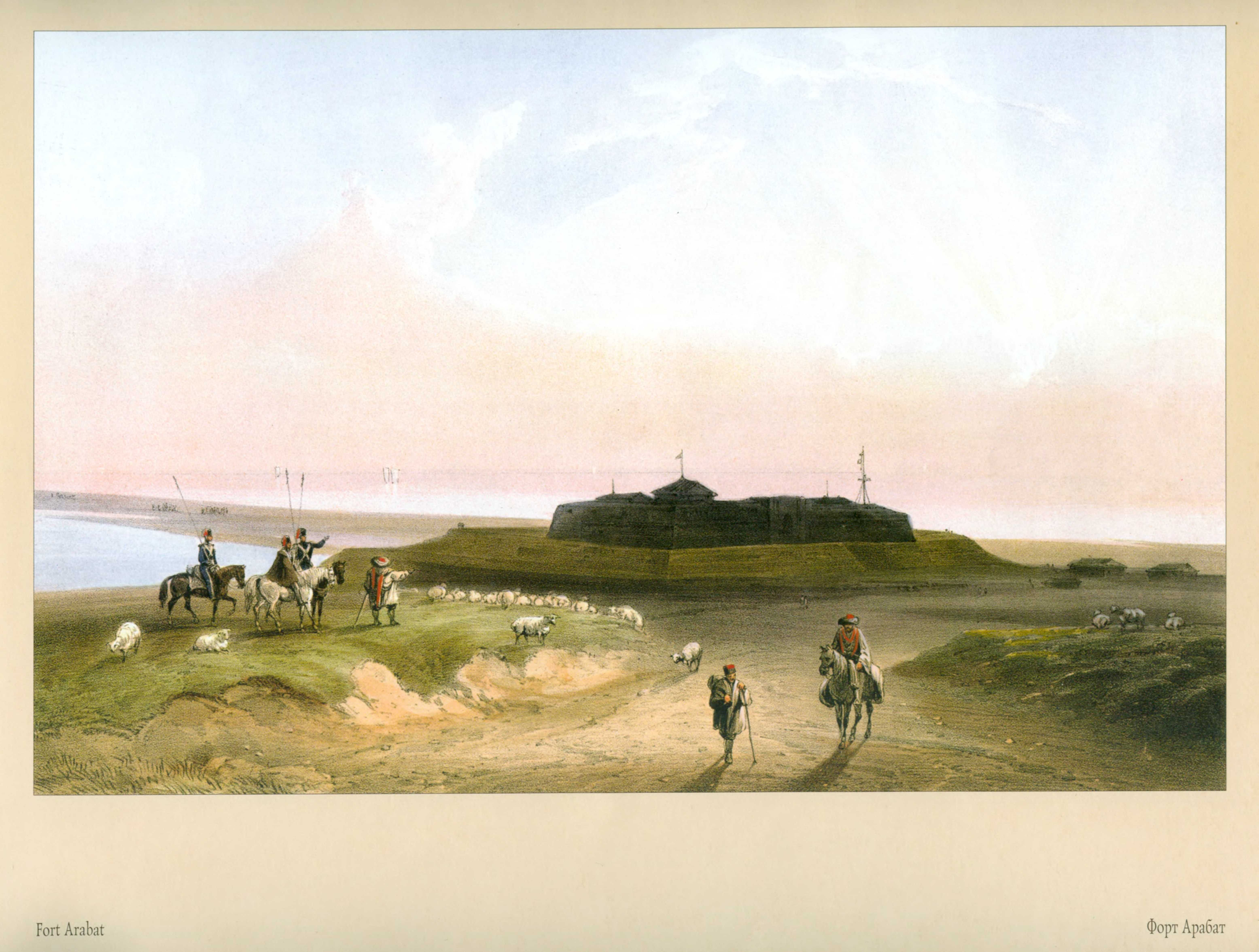
- Arabat Fortress. Painting by Carlo Bossoli, 1856 (the last year of the Crimean War)

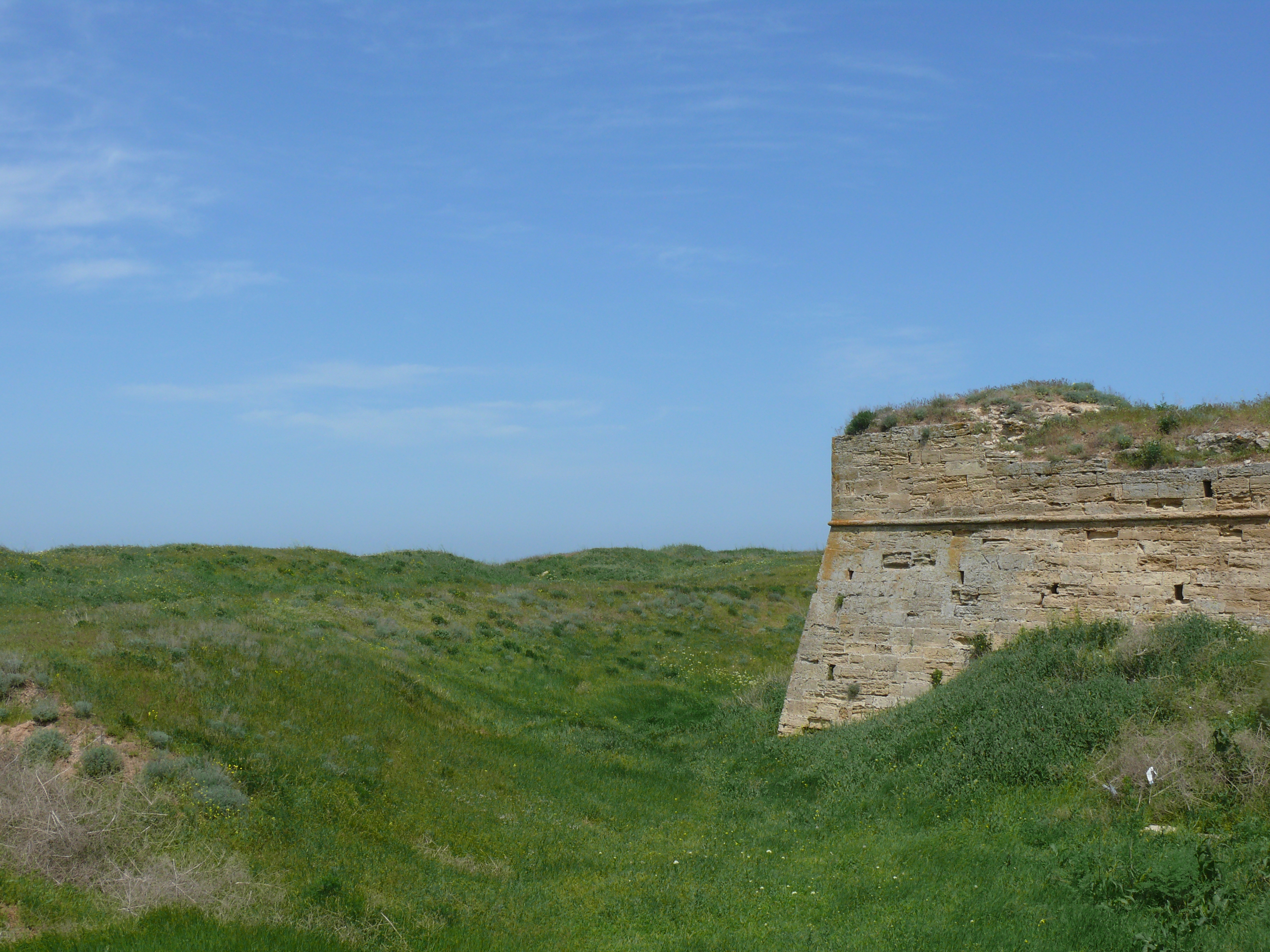
- A corner of the fortress, 2010

Site information
- Open to the public: yes
- Condition: ruins

Location
- Coordinates: 45°17′45″N 35°28′42″E

Site history
- Built: second half of the 17th century
- Materials: Stone

The Arabat Fortress, built in the 17th century by the Ottoman army, stands at the southernmost part of the Arabat Spit. Its purpose was to guard the spit and Crimea from invasions. It was in use, with intermissions, until the Crimean War of 1853–1856.

== Name ==
The name of the Arabat Fortress originates from either Arabic "rabat", meaning a "military post", or Turkic "arabat" meaning a "suburb", and is the origin of the name of the Arabat Spit.

== History ==
=== Background: classical antiquity ===
There is information about a fortification that stood at the site during the times of the Bosporan Kingdom (the kingdom existed between the 5th century BCE – 4th century CE).

=== Ottoman fortress ===
The 1475 Turkish invasion of Crimea rang the death knell of the Genoese colonies there, leading to the destruction of the Genoese fortresses on the peninsula. The Turks built or rebuilt fortresses in all strategically important points of the peninsula, their main fortresses being Or Qapi at Perekop, Arabat, Yeni-Kale on the Kerch Strait, Gözleve, and Kefe.

The fortress was probably built in the second half of the 17th century by the Turkish army and was first depicted on a map compiled by Jacob von Sandrart in 1651. This map was based on material collected by French military engineer and cartographer, Guillaume Le Vasseur de Beauplan, author of the 1651 book Description d'Ukranie.

The fortress had a relatively advanced military design, is octagonal in shape with 3-meter thick stone walls, and was surrounded by an earthen wall and a moat. It contained five towers and two gates. Several rows of embrasures faced east, north and west and were designed for various artillery types. Whereas the fortress was hard to conquer when properly defended, its remote location from Turkey meant that its garrison was often understaffed, allowing Russian troops to bypass it in 1737 and to take it by storm in 1771. Prior to that, it was plundered by the Zaporozhian Cossacks in 1667.

=== Russian Empire ===
After Crimea became part of Russia in 1783, the fortress was abandoned, but was later refurbished and used by Russians during the Crimean War of 1853–1856 to defend the Crimean coast. After the war, the fortress was again abandoned and its walls were used by the people of the nearby small village of Arabat as a source of stone.

=== Soviet Union ===
The Arabat Spit saw again heavy fighting between the Soviet Red Army and the White Army in 1920 and the German Army during World War II in 1941–1944.

In 1968, some scenes of a famous Soviet film, Two Comrades Were Serving, were shot there.

=== Ukraine ===
Google Earth satellite imagery shows the fort has been occupied by military forces since the Annexation of Crimea by the Russian Federation in 2014.
