= Pidhaitsi =

City in Ternopil Oblast, Ukraine

Pidhaitsi Підгайці
- City
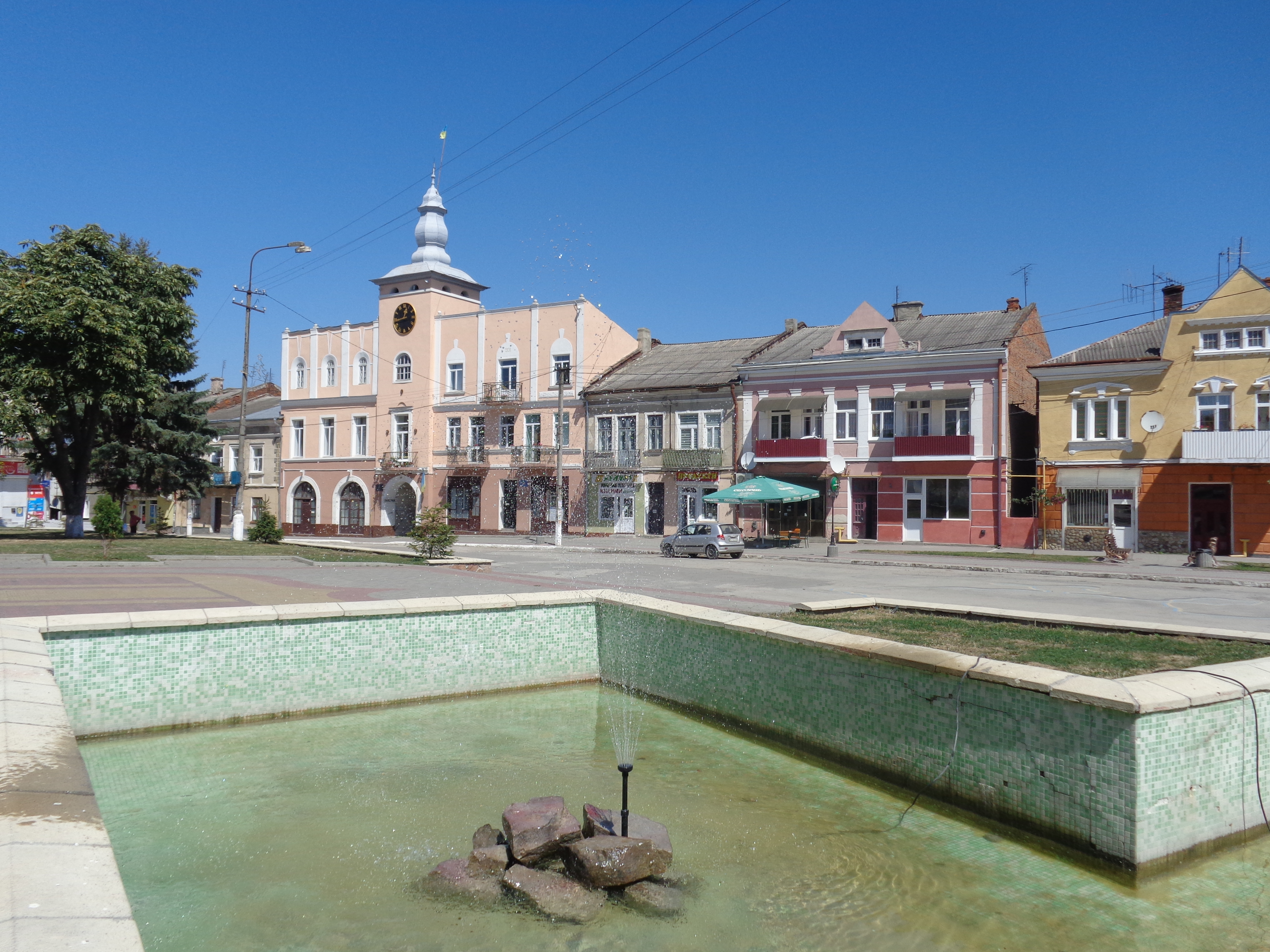
- Independence Square

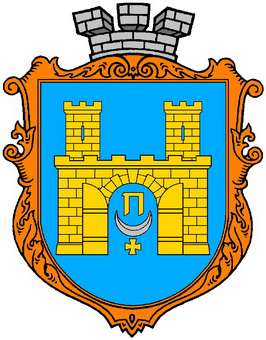
- Flag Coat of arms

- Location within Ternopil Oblast Location within Ukraine Location within Europe
- Coordinates: 49°16′10″N 25°8′0″E
- Country: Ukraine
- Oblast: Ternopil Oblast
- Raion: Ternopil Raion
- Hromada: Pidhaitsi urban hromada
- First mentioned: 1463
- Magdeburg rights: 1539

Population (2022)
  - Total: 2,609
- Time zone: UTC+2 (EET)
  - Summer (DST): UTC+3 (EEST)
- Postal code: 6124810100
- Website: pidgayci-miskrada.gov.ua

Pidhaitsi (Ukrainian: Підгайці, IPA: [pidˈɦai̯ts⁽ʲ⁾i]; Polish: Podhajce; Yiddish: פֿאַרהייצע, פּידײַיִץ, romanized: Pidayitz) is a small city in Ternopil Raion, Ternopil Oblast, western Ukraine. It is located approximately 15.5 miles (24.9 km) south of Berezhany, 43.5 miles (70.0 km) from Ternopil, and 62 miles (100 km) south-east of Lviv. In 1939, Pidhaitsi obtained the formal status of a city. It hosts the administration of Pidhaitsi urban hromada, one of the hromadas of Ukraine. Population: 2,609 (2022 estimate).

Many of the current residents have the surname Koropetskyi/Koropetska, likely attributable to the city's proximity to the Koropets River.

== History ==
Historical affiliations

Kingdom of Poland 1436–1569
Polish–Lithuanian Commonwealth 1569–1772
Austrian Empire 1772–1867 (occupation)
Austria-Hungary 1867-1917 (occupation)
∟ Russian Empire 1914 (occupation)
∟ Russian Empire 1917 (occupation)
West Ukrainian People's Republic 1918-1919
Poland 1919-1939
Soviet Union 1939-1941 (occupation)
Nazi Germany 1941-1943 (occupation)
Soviet Union 1944-1991
Ukraine 1991-present

According to the sources, Pidhaitsi is one of the oldest settlements in the area. It was established in 1445. The first written records of the town date to 1436, when a Catholic church was built by the regional governor, a member of the Potocki noble family. Because of the Tatar invasions and its precarious location on Poland’s main route to the south, the city was surrounded by series of ramparts and rows with water. Most of the key monuments (churches, synagogue) were all built in impressive defensive style. In its early years, the town was governed according to Ruthenian and Polish law. In 1539 it was granted the right to use Magdeburg law. It was one of the centers of Armenians in Poland, with the first Armenians in Podhajce mentioned in 1657, the Armenian Catholic church built by 1672, and the Armenian commune founded by 1675. Poland fought victorious battles against invading Tatars and Turks at Podhajce in 1667 and 1698.

Pre-war coat of arms

In modern period, Pidhaitsi was among the most important urban centers in western part of Podolia. Its population was almost entirely Jews and Poles. In 1897 an obelisk was erected adjacent to the (Polish) Catholic church to celebrate the 100th birthday of Polish writer Adam Mickiewicz. While the monument is still extant, the church is in desolate condition. In one of Pidhaitsi houses resided famous Polish composer Frédéric Chopin. After the Second World War, Pidhaitsi, along with most of eastern Galicia, was separated from Poland and annexed to the Ukrainian Soviet Socialist Republic in the Soviet Union. Since that time, the population has been almost entirely ethnically Ukrainian.

During Soviet rule (1945–1991) Pidhaitsi was part of Berezhany Raion. After Ukrainian independence, a separated Pidhaitsi Raion was established. Until 18 July 2020, Pidhaitsi was the administrative center of Pidhaitsi Raion. The raion was abolished in July 2020 as part of the administrative reform of Ukraine, which reduced the number of raions of Ternopil Oblast to three. The area of Pidhaitsi Raion was merged into Ternopil Raion.

=== Jewish community ===
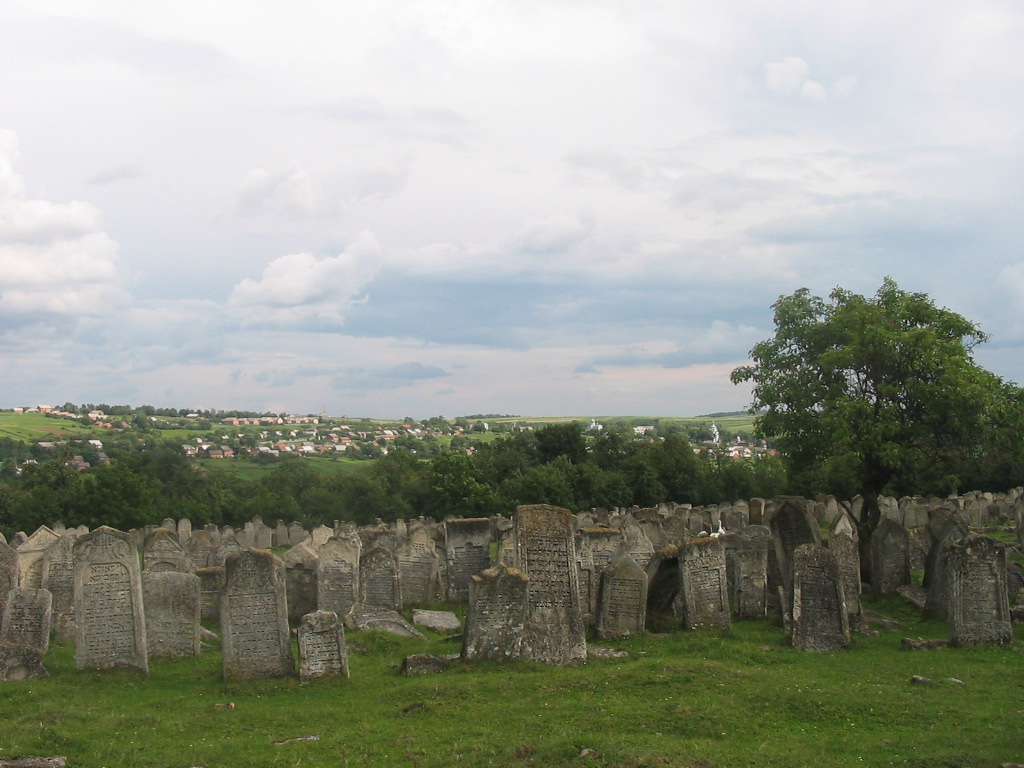
Jewish cemetery

Prior to the Second World War, Pidhaitsi had a significant Jewish community. The population census of 1765 lists 1,370 Jews in the kahal district of Pidhaitsi and 1,079 Jews lived in Pidhaitsi itself. A century late town’s Jewish population significantly increased and numbered ca. 6,000 Jews in Pidhaitsi and 8,212 Jews in Pidhaitsi district (9.33% of whole population in the area). In the 20th century Pidahytsi's importance declined and the number of the Jews decreased to 2,827 according to the census of 1931. Pidhaitsi Synagogue (between 1621 and 1648), and the local Catholic parish church (1634) are the oldest buildings in the city. The synagogue is closed and in ruined condition. In the post-war years, the synagogue territory was turned into a market by the communists.

With the break of the Second World War there was a large influx of Jewish refugees from the west and the number of the Jews in the town at the time of Nazi annihilation was higher than 3,000. Pidhaitsi Judenrat was headed by Leibish Lilienfeld. Due to the refugee and hygienic problems, in the winter of 1941–42 many of town Jews died of hunger and typhus epidemic. In 1942, on September 21 (Yom Kippur – Jewish most revered holiday, the day of atonement from sin) over 1,000 Jews were sent to the Belzec extermination camp and on October 30, 1,500 more Jews were deported to face death in Belzec extermination camp. Hundreds more were murdered in Pidhaitsi and its environs by Germans and Ukrainian police.

The above memories of his experiences during the liquidation of the ghetto in Pidhaitsi has described by Genia Schwartz.

== Monuments ==
- Pidhaitsi Castle

== Population ==
Year	Total Population	Jewish Population
1880	5,943	4,012
1890	5,646	3,879
1900	5,790	3,557
1910	5,576	3,497
1921	4,814	2,872
1959	3,033	
1970	3,230	
1979	3,343	
1989	3,661	
2001	3,280	
2009	2,946	
2010	2,947	
2011	2,937	
2012	2,908	
2013	2,866	
2014	2,830	
2015	2,806	
2016	3,300	0
2017	2,761	

== Notable people ==
- Julian Bilecki, Righteous Among the Nations
- Ignacy Potocki, Polish count
- Tadeusz Łomnicki, Polish actor
- Jan Łomnicki, Polish film director and screenwriter
- Stanisław Rewera Potocki, Polish magnate and military leader
- Jerzy Choróbski, Polish neurosurgeon
- Leonard Rettel, Polish poet and writer
- Mikołaj Wolski, Polish military leader
- Arthur Murray, American dancer
- Abraham Weiss, professor of Talmud

== Gallery ==
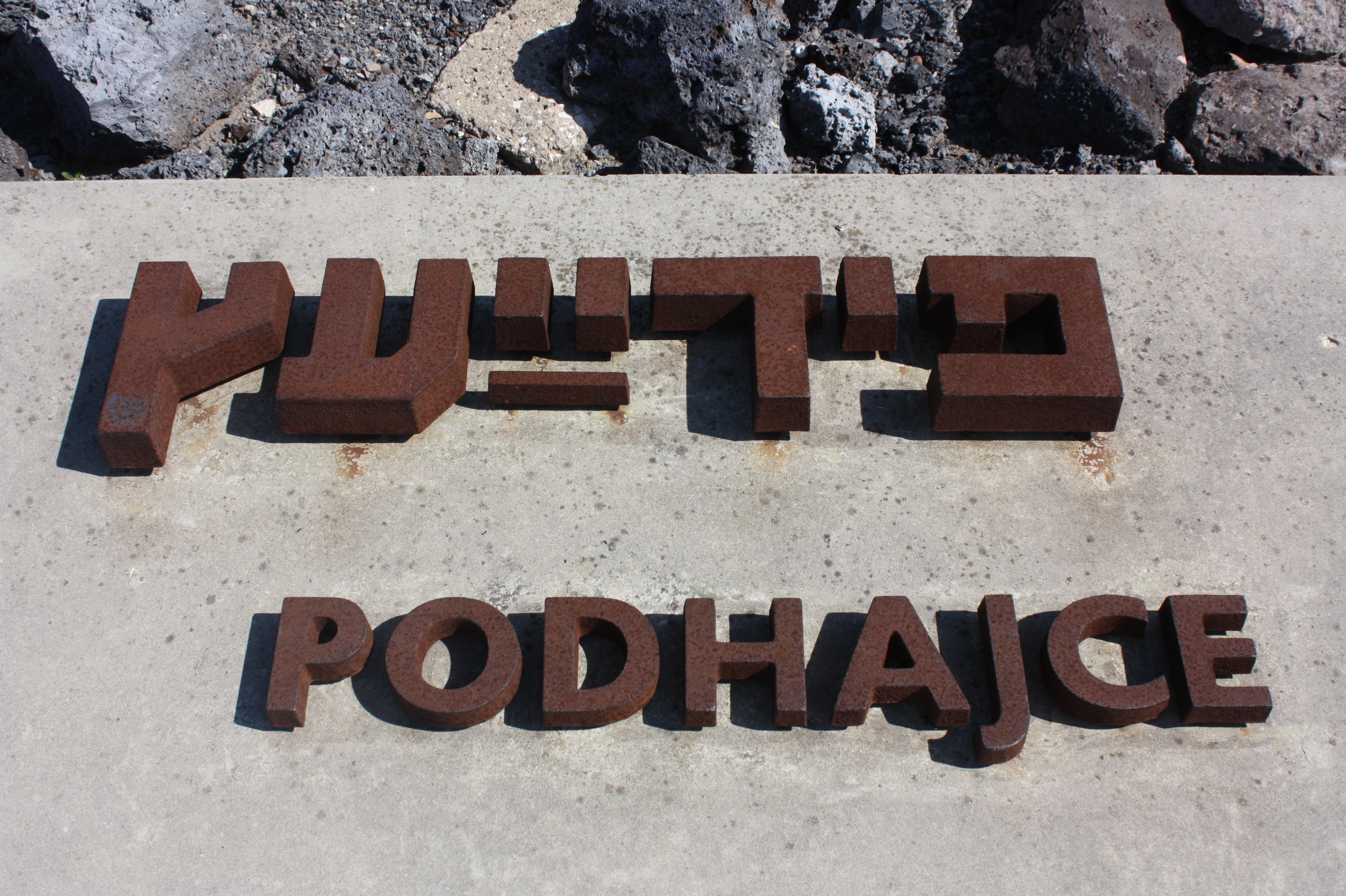
Belzec - inscription

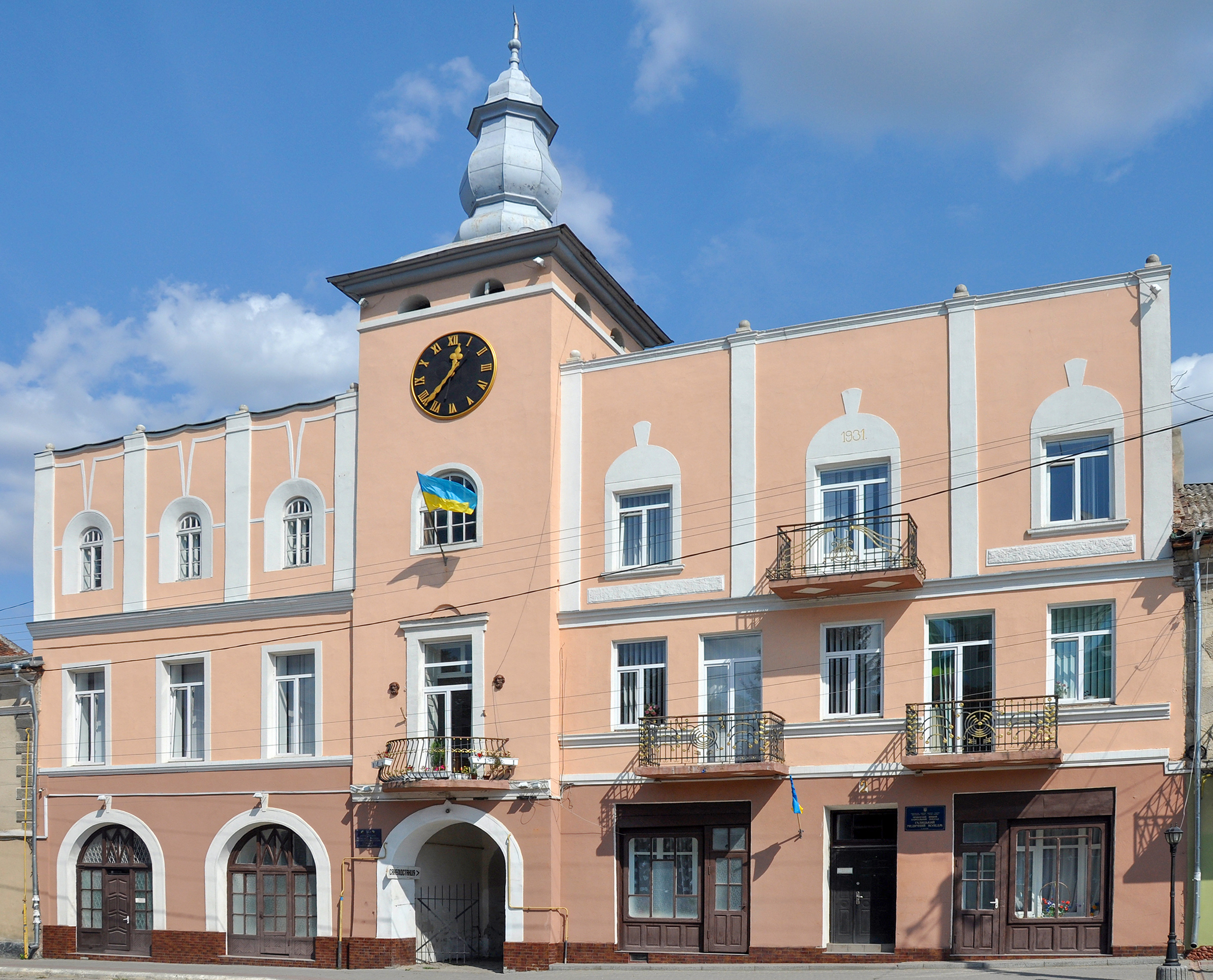
Old town hall

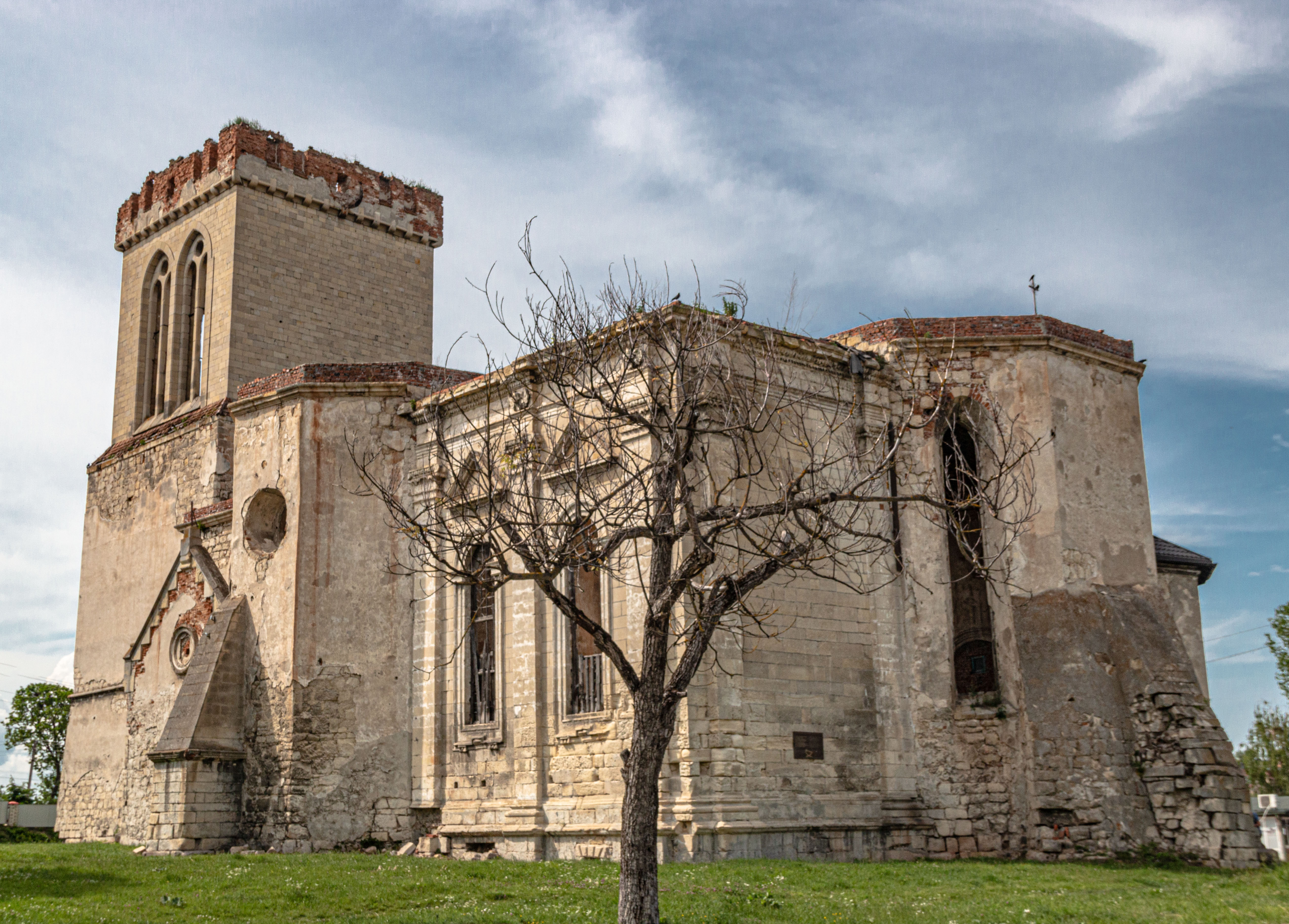
Holy Trinity Church

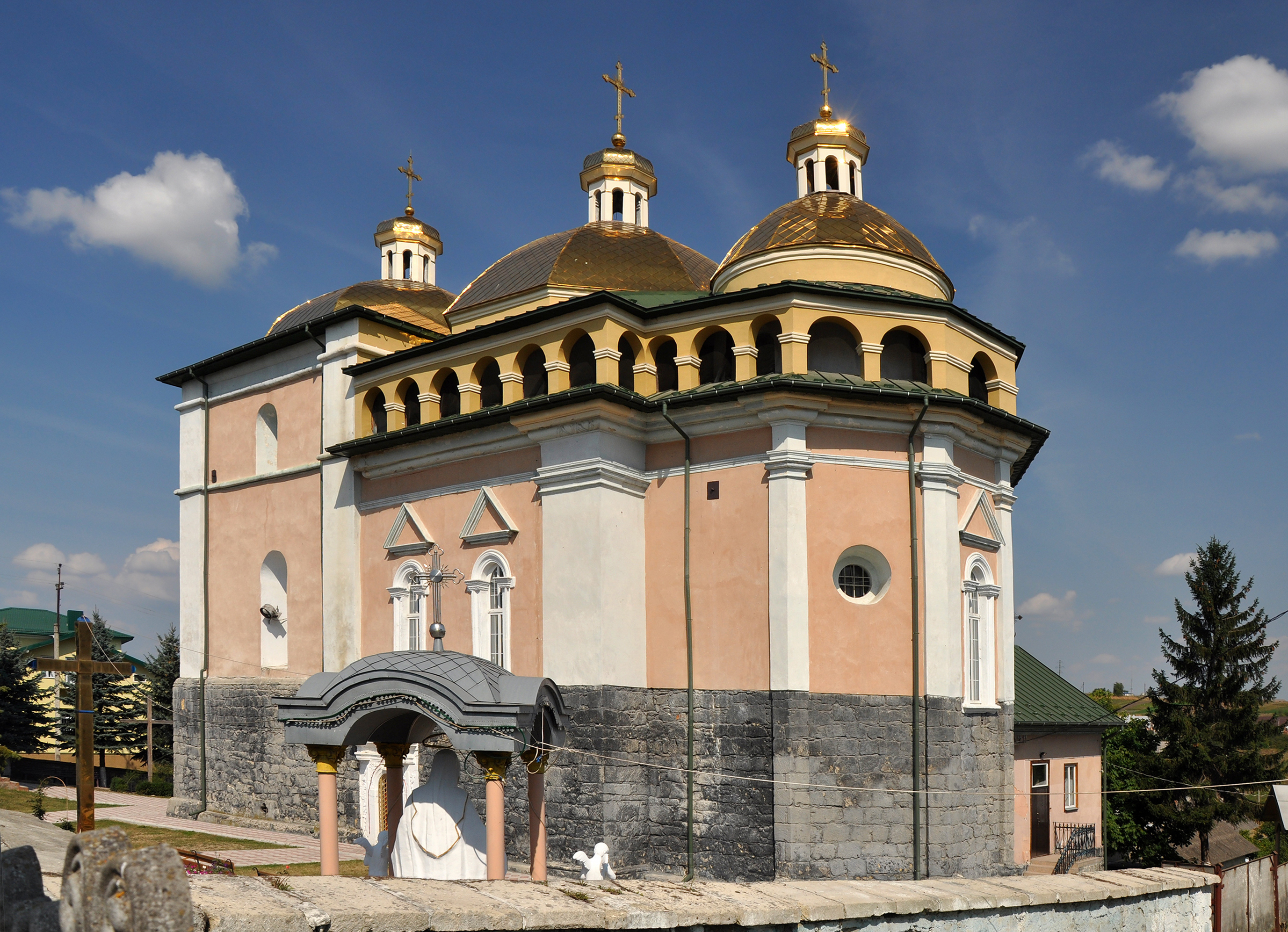
Church of the Dormition

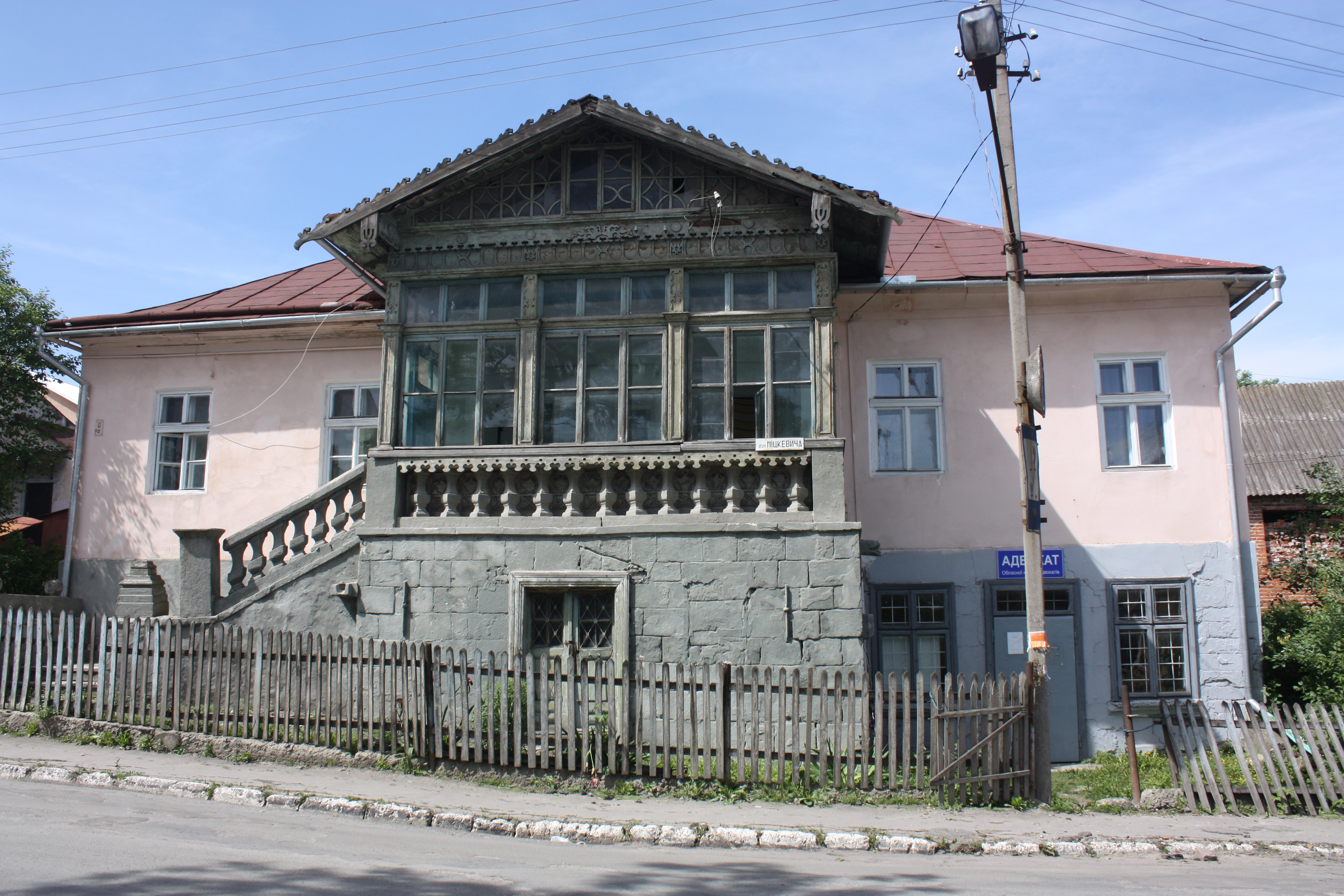
House of Marcelina Czartoryska, student of Fryderyk Chopin

== See also ==
- Podhajcer Shul, New York City
