= Pidhaitsi Castle =

Castle in Pidhaitsi, Ukraine

- Підгаєцький замок
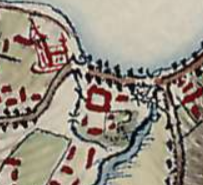
- Pidhaitsi Castle on the map by Friedrich von Mieg, 18th century

General information
- Location: Pidhaitsi, Ternopil Raion, Ternopil Oblast
- Country: Ukraine
- Coordinates: 49°16′07.4″N 25°08′34.9″E

The Pidhaitsi Castle (Ukrainian: Підгаєцький замок, romanized: Pidhayets'kyi zamok) is a defensive castle built in Pidhaitsi, Ternopil Oblast on the Koropets River.

== Location ==
An artificially raised island was chosen as the site for the castle, which was flanked on the east by the waters of the Koropets River, a left-bank tributary of the Dniester, and on the west and north by the Muzhylivka River, a tributary of the Koropets. The citadel's foundations reached the river from the west and fell into its bed, separating the castle from the buildings of the city, which was located to the west of it. The castle was located just below the Pidhaitsi pond.

== History ==
It is most likely that the castle was built by Buczacki in the 15th century. It was expanded by subsequent owners, especially Stanislaw Golski in the early 17th century. In 1650–1657, owner Stanisław "Rewera" Potocki fortified the town and castle. In 1655 the city and the castle were captured by joint Russian and Cossack armies. In 1663 King John II Casimir Vasa of Poland stayed at the castle. During the Battle of Podhajce in 1667, John III Sobieski, later King of Poland, while preparing the previously anticipated battle site, garrisoned two ravelins located north of the Pidhaitsi fortifications with infantry. In 1675, Ibrahim Basha, who was at the head of the Turkish army, besieged the town and castle, which he captured on 11 September, and then ravaged, destroying the castle and abducting the inhabitants with the fortress crew and its commander Makowiecki.

In 1698, Feliks Kazimierz Potocki, governor of Kraków and field hetman of the crown, pursued by some 14,000 Tatars, leaned on the walls of the local castle on 8 September during the Battle of Podhajce. The four-hour battle was followed by the retreat of the Tatar army. This was the last Polish victory over the Tatars in the war with Turkey.

By the 18th century it was no longer inhabited and had fallen into disrepair. In the 19th century, a brewery and distillery were set up inside, which operated until World War II. In 1970, the remnants of the castle that had been there until then were finally destroyed. Today, the castle does not exist. In its place is a canning factory.

== Architecture ==
Originally, the city had its own fortification system and a castle built, which probably could have been treated as a citadel, which was the last bastion for the citizens in case the enemy broke the defense on the city walls. Pidhaitsi had defensive walls, an old castle with powerful towers, surrounded by ramparts. Dalerac, a courtier to King Jan III Sobieski of Poland, wrote about the castle as an old-fashioned building, having massive towers and high terraces, surrounded by ramparts.
