= Julian Bilecki =

Polish farmer (1928–2007)

Julian Bilecki (also written Yulian Biletskiy) (1928–2007) was a Polish farmer who helped his family save 23 Jews as a teenager during the Holocaust in Poland. Decades later, they were recognized as Righteous Among the Nations for their actions.

In 1943, nearly all the families of the Jewish community in Podhajce, Eastern Galicia, amounting to about 3,000 Jews, were slaughtered by the Nazis. A small group, many of them children and teenagers, escaped from the Podhajce ghetto on the eve of its liquidation, and survived the Nazi extermination finding their way to the Bileckis' khutor. They were then hidden in various bunkers near the Bilecki family farm for almost a year until the liberation of the area by the Red Army on March 27, 1944.

== Early life and family ==
Julian Bilecki was born in 1928, eleven years before the start of World War II. His father's name was Eugeniusz (Yevgenyi) Bilecki, and his sister was named Anna Kifor (née Bilecka). He had a cousin named Roman Bilecki, who played a key role in hiding the Jews. They lived in Podhajce, Eastern Galicia (part of the Second Polish Republic before the war; contemporary Pidhaitsi, Ukraine).

== War years ==
On the eve of Shavuot, about 140 Polish Jews escaped from the Podhajce ghetto on the eve of its liquidation by Nazi death squads. After being attacked by Ukrainian nationalists, most were killed, including their leader Israel Zilber; only 23 were still alive. Hershko Grau and Shiko Zisser requested help from the Bileckis. The survivors reached the Bilecki farm on June 6, 1943. The Bileckis decided to take them into hiding and built a wooden bunker in the forest, camouflaged with branches and leaves. They provided food daily for the 23 people hidden in the bunker.

The safehouse was rapidly discovered by local passers-by, and the Bileckis built a second, then a third bunker for the Jews in hiding to protect them from discovery by locals. In the winter, the ground was covered with snow, footprints on which would reveal the movements to and from the hiding place. Sabina Grau Schnitzer, one of the survivors of the Podhajce ghetto liquidation, recalled how a young Julian Bilecki would jump from tree to tree in to deliver necessary items to his Jewish friends in order to avoid leaving tracks in the snow.

On April 1, 1944, the Red Army arrived in and liberated the area where the Bilecki family and Jewish survivors lived.

== Post-war activities ==
After the Podhajce Jews were liberated on March 27, 1944, Julian's cousin Roman emigrated to the US while Julian himself remained in Europe. Over the years, the survivors sent packages of food and clothing to the Bilecki family, who had remained poor in Ukraine, and the Bileckis and survivors corresponded through letters. In 1998, half a century later, Julian Bilecki (by then a retired bus driver) and his son Jaroslav flew to New York City with help from the Jewish Foundation for the Righteous, where he was reunited with 5 survivors at the JFK airport terminal. The director of the Foundation, Ms. Stahl, reports Julian to have said tearfully on meeting the survivors "I see you all have gray hair. I too have gray hair. I thought I would never see you again. I feel lost. I thought this would never happen. All I did was help. It is very pleasant that people remember. Now I am getting paid back by God".

The survivors arranged for the family to be honored as Righteous Gentiles by Yad Vashem in Jerusalem. The Bliecki family, including Julian, received the Righteous Among the Nations distinction in 1990 (with two extended family members recognized in 1996).

== List of those saved by Bilecki and his family ==
- Hershko Grau
- Shake Zisser
- Three Rozman sisters
- Ridkis family
- Feldberg family
- Chaim Weintraub, pharmacist
- Izio Loeb
- Mina Blumenfield
- Sabina Grau Schnitzer
- Three Zilber siblings
- Gilta Fink
