= Battle of Kalnyk =

- Part of Polish–Cossack–Tatar War (1666–1671)
Date	15–30 October 1671
Location	Kalnyk, Right-bank Ukraine
Result	Battle – Polish-Lithuanian victory Siege – Cossack-Tatar victory

Belligerents
Polish–Lithuanian Commonwealth; Cossack Hetmanate	Cossack Hetmanate; Crimean Khanate

Commanders and leaders
John III Sobieski; Mykhailo Khanenko	Jarema Petranowski

Strength
1,200 cavalry	Infantry: 2,000; Cossacks: 1,000; Total: 3,000

Casualties and losses
Unknown	500 killed

The Battle of Kalnyk took place on 15–30 October 1671, during the Polish-Cossack-Tatar war of 1666-1671. The Polish crown hetman Jan Sobieski, supported by the Cossacks of Mykhailo Khanenko, besieged the Cossack garrison in the city of Kalnyk. Despite defeating the Cossack-Tatar forces in the battle on 21 of October, Sobieski failed to take Kalnyk after a two weeks-long unsuccessful siege and retreated to Bratslav.

== Background ==
After the victory in the Battle of Bratslav, the Polish crown hetman Jan Sobieski decided to seize the territory between the Southern Bug and the Dniester. On 11 September 1671 he sent 2 thousand soldiers to capture Vinnytsia, which was taken at dawn on 14 September. The townspeople and Cossacks, locked in the Jesuit monastery (there were no other fortifications), put up stubborn resistance. Only after 6 hours of storming, when most of the defenders were killed, the monastery fell. However, 120 Cossacks, sheltered under the roof of the church, continued to fight until morning. When 23 were left alive, they decided to surrender: the centurion and seven chiefs were sent to Bar, the rest were beheaded. The town was destroyed, and a significant part of women and children were taken prisoner by the soldiers (by order of J. Sobieski they were later released).

Sobieski's successful actions were facilitated by diversions against the Belgorod Tatars by Mykhailo Khanenko and Ivan Sirko and the defection of Colonel Mykhailo Zelensky and Colonel Pavlo Lysytsia of Bratslav to his side.

The military council of the Polish command on 29 September 1671 adopted a plan of attack deep into Ukraine. On 1 October Jan Sobieski went to Mogilev. Having received information about his approach, Ostap Gogol on 3 October expressed readiness to surrender the city. Having learned that Bratslav had surrendered to Khanenko, the crown hetman sent the main forces of the army there, and himself with 1200 horsemen arrived in Mogilev on 7 October. Leaving the garrison there, he went to Bratslav and on 12 October held a meeting under its walls with the participation of M. Khanenko, I. Sirko, M. Zelensky and P. Lysytsia, at which M. Khanenko's proposal to occupy Kalnyk was accepted.

== Battle ==
On 17 of October, the Polish-Cossack army approached Kalnyk and began firing on the city from the cannons. However, the Cossack garrison of the city put up a strong resistance. Following the unsuccessful Polish attempts to seize Kalnyk on 17–18 October, Jan Sobieski decided to retreat towards Illintsi and began the blockade of Kalnyk. The soldiers burnt all the surrounding farms and bread fields. Doroshenko has sent a Cossack-Tatar army with a total strength of about 3 thousand people in order to help the besieged, which arrived on 20 October. While the Doroshenko's Cossacks managed to enter the city, the Polish cavalry attacked the Tatars near the town and inflicted a heavy casualties on them - in the battle for the dam near the town, 500 out of 2000 Tatars were killed or drowned in the deep pond. On 27 October in the Polish camp near Ilyintsi, 1 thousand Cossacks held a council, where a new hetman, Mykhailo Khanenko, was elected. He was presented with kleinodes sent by the king, although some of those present wished to see Ivan Sirko in his place. Having learnt that Nuradin-sultan Safa-Girey was coming to Doroshenko's aid, and the expected Lithuanian army would not come to his aid, Jan Sobieski lifted the siege of Kalnyk and went to Bratslav.

== Aftermath ==
While being in Bratslav, on 1 November Sobieski announced the end of the campaign. Surrendering the command to Dymitr Wiśniowiecki, he left for Lviv. In turn, the Polish hetman handed over the leadership of the Kiev army to the Kiev chorunge Stanislav Vizhytsky.

The invasion of the Poles into Cossack Ukraine and the siege of Bratslav became a challenge for the Ottoman Empire. Already in October Mehmed IV warned the king to not attack "the Cossack power with all its districts", demanded to withdraw troops, threatening to start a war.

At the very end of the year Doroshenko received solid help from his Tatar allies: 26000 Tatars and several thousand Turks came. Having received help, Doroshenko started to reclaim Podolia. He started severe repressions against those who had voluntarily defected to the Poles.

== Literature ==
- Leszek Podhorodecki, «Chanat Krymski i jego stosunki z Polską w XV-XVIIIw.», Warszawa 1987, ISBN 83-05-11618-2, str. 214
- Наталія Яковенко, Нарис історії України з найдавніших часів до кінця XVIII ст. Розділ V. КОЗАЦЬКА ЕРА--§ 2. Руїна (1658–1686)--Андрусівське розполовинення
- Смолій В. А., Степанков В. М. Українська національна революція XVII ст. (1648—1676 рр.). — (Сер. Україна крізь віки) Т.7. — К.: Альтернативи, 1999. — 352 с. ISBN 966-7217-26-4
- ДМИТРО ДОРОШЕНКО НАРИС ІСТОРІЇ УКРАЇНИ 1966 Видавництво «ДНІПРОВА ХВИЛЯ» — Мюнхен/«ГЛОБУС» КИЇВ 1992 Том 2, розділ 4
- Літопис Самовидця. видання підготував Я. І. Дзира. — Київ: «Наукова думка», 1971. — 208 с
- Літопис гадяцького полковника Григорія Грабянки / Пер. із староукр. — К.: Т-во «Знання» України, 1992, — 192 с
- Величко С. В. Літопис. Т. 1. / Пер. з книжної української мови, вст. стаття, комент. В. О. Шевчука; Відп. ред. О. В. Мишанич.— К.: *Дніпро, 1991.— 371 с.; Літопис. Т. 2. / Пер. з книжної української мови, комент. В. О. Шевчука; Відп. ред. О. В. Мишанич.— К.: Дніпро, 1991.— 642 с.

== Links ==
- Официальный сайт села Кальник и Кальницкого казацкого полка
