= Battle of Podhajce (1667) =

1667 battle

- Part of the Polish–Cossack–Tatar War (1666–1671)
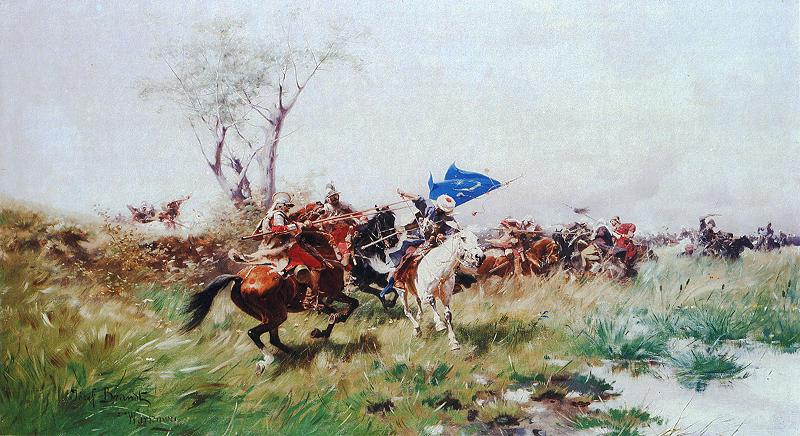
- Polish–Lithuanian cavalry attacking the Tatars and the Cossacks during the battle. Painting by Józef Brandt
Date	6–16 October 1667
Location	Podhajce, Ruthenian Voivodeship, Polish–Lithuanian Commonwealth 49°16′10″N 25°8′10″E
Result	Polish–Lithuanian victory

Belligerents
Crimean Khanate; Cossack Hetmanate	Polish–Lithuanian Commonwealth

Commanders and leaders
Adil Giray; Petro Doroshenko	John III Sobieski; Aleksander Polanowski

Strength
16,000–20,000 Tatars; 15,000 Cossacks; 3,000 Janissaries; 52 cannons	3,000 soldiers 6,000 peasants 18 cannons

Casualties and losses
Unknown	500 killed and wounded

The Battle of Podhajce or Pidhaitsi (6–16 October 1667) was fought in the town of Podhajce in the Polish–Lithuanian Commonwealth (nowadays Pidhaitsi, western Ukraine), and the area surrounding it as part of the Polish–Tatar War. The army of the Polish–Lithuanian Commonwealth under John III Sobieski, totaling around 9,000 men, defeated Tatar and Cossack forces under Petro Doroshenko and Adil Giray, which totaled around 35,000 men.

== Background ==
On January 31, 1667 the Polish–Lithuanian Commonwealth and the Tsardom of Russia signed the Treaty of Andrusovo. Russia gained the control of Left-bank Ukraine, while the commonwealth maintained the rule of Right-bank Ukraine, which would be defended by Polish-Lithuanian and Russian forces. The end of the war gave time to commonwealth armies for reinforcement. In the same period Petro Doroshenko, Hetman of Right-bank Ukraine, in order to establish his rule in Right-bank Ukraine, signed a treaty with Sultan Mehmed IV that recognized the Cossack Hetmanate as a vassal of the Ottoman Empire.

To further increase his military strength Doroshenko allied with Adil Giray, the khan of the Crimean Khanate. After gathering 15,000 Cossacks, about 18,000 Tatars, and 3,000 Janissaries sent by the Ottoman Empire to support the Cossacks, Doroshenko attacked the area of Podhajce in western Ukraine. Polish-Lithuanian forces under John III Sobieski, made up mostly of armed villagers, orthodox Galician Ruthenians who remained loyal to Polish kings since the beginning of Chmelnitsky's uprising, encamped themselves on the southern part of Podhajce in order to gain a strategic advantage against the army of Doroshenko. On October 4, 1667 the Cossack-Tatar forces, supported by Janissaries arrived in Podhajce.

== Battle ==
On October 6, 1667 Tatar forces under Adil Giray attacked the Polish-Lithuanian army. The Polish-Lithuanian infantry, supported by Polish multiple guns, defeated the Tatars and counterattacked. On the following days Cossack, Tatar and Janissary troops unsuccessfully tried to circumvent the right wing of the Polish-Lithuanian army, and flank attack the left wing of the troops of the Commonwealth.

Sobieski sent forces on the left wing of the army, and outnumbered the Cossack-Tatar forces, which were defeated. After the failure of consecutive attacked, Doroshenko unsuccessfully besieged the town of Podhajce, which was defended by Jan Sobieski. In the middle of October, 1667 Sobieski and Doroshenko signed an armistice and the Cossack-Tatar army retreated from Podhajce. Ivan Sirko's incursion into Crimea diverted a large number of Tatars which played a role in the outcome of this battle, and the rebellious Hetman Doroshenko recognized the power of the Commonwealth over the Cossacks.

== Aftermath ==
After defeating Doroshenko in Podhajce, John III Sobieski was promoted to commander-in-chief of the Polish-Lithuanian army and Grand Crown Hetman, the highest military rank in the Polish–Lithuanian Commonwealth.
