= Podhajcer Shul =

Synagogue in Manhattan, New York

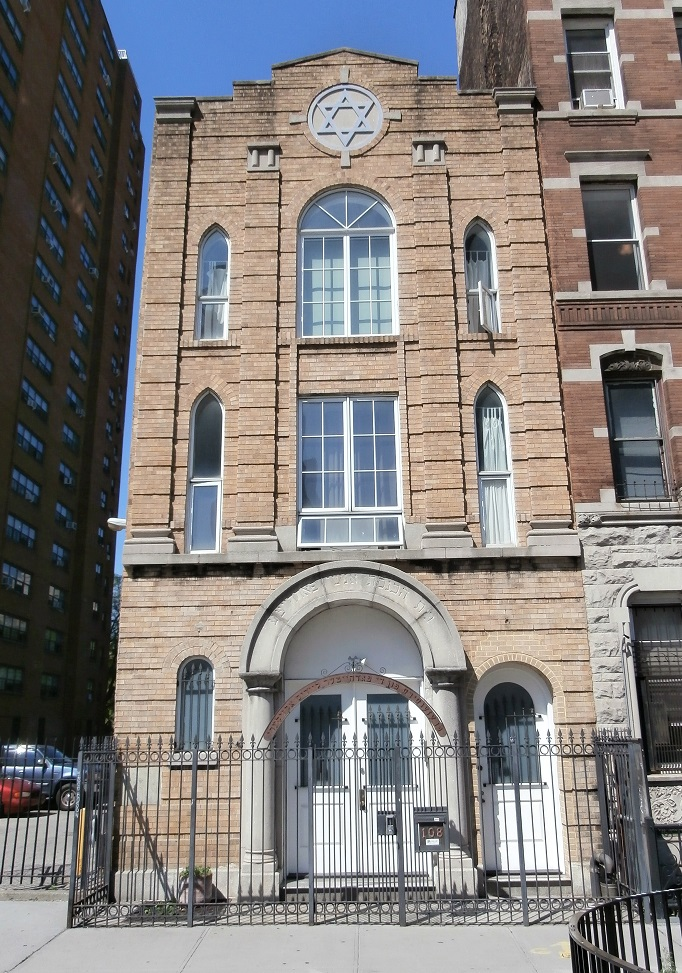
- The former synagogue, now private residence, in 2017

- Location of the former synagogue in Lower Manhattan

Religion
- Affiliation: Orthodox Judaism (former)
- Ecclesiastical or organizational status: Synagogue (1926 – 1990); Private residence (since c. 2000)
- Status: Closed; repurposed as a residence

Location
- Location: 108 East First Street, Lower East Side, Manhattan, New York City, New York
- Country: United States
- Interactive map of Podhajcer Shul
- Coordinates: 40°43′22″N 73°59′12″W

Architecture
- Established: 1895 (as a congregation)
- Completed: 1926 (as a synagogue)

The Podhajcer Shul is a former Orthodox synagogue, now private residence, located at 108 East First Street, just north of Houston Street, on the Lower East Side of Manhattan, in New York City, New York, in the United States.

Although the building has been repurposed to residential use, its façade retains a prominent Star of David, as well as a stone arch inscribed "Beth HaKnesset Ansche Podhajce," which means "Synagogue of the People of Podhajce," and two capitals in the shape of Torah scrolls.

== History ==
Congregation Masas Benjamin Podhajce was founded in 1895 by Austrian Jews from Podhajce, Galicia. In 1926, they purchased the building on 1st Street and consecrated it as their new synagogue. During the 1920s, another congregation, Rodeph Shalom Independent Pohajce, shared the building with Masas Benjamin Podhajce. Neither of these congregations exist anymore. In the 1980s, a group of Lithuanian Jews named Kochob Jacob Anshe Kamenitz used the synagogue. This congregation was organized in 1892 and had previously met at 248 Division Street, 385 Grand Street and 54–56 Pitt Street. The building was empty from 1985 to 1990, when it was taken over by Congregation Beth Yitzchoch. In 1995, the building was rented as a space for visual and performing arts. The building was later repurposed to residential use.
