= Crimean campaign (1667) =

- Part of the Cossack raids, Sirko's campaigns and Polish–Cossack–Tatar War (1666–1671)
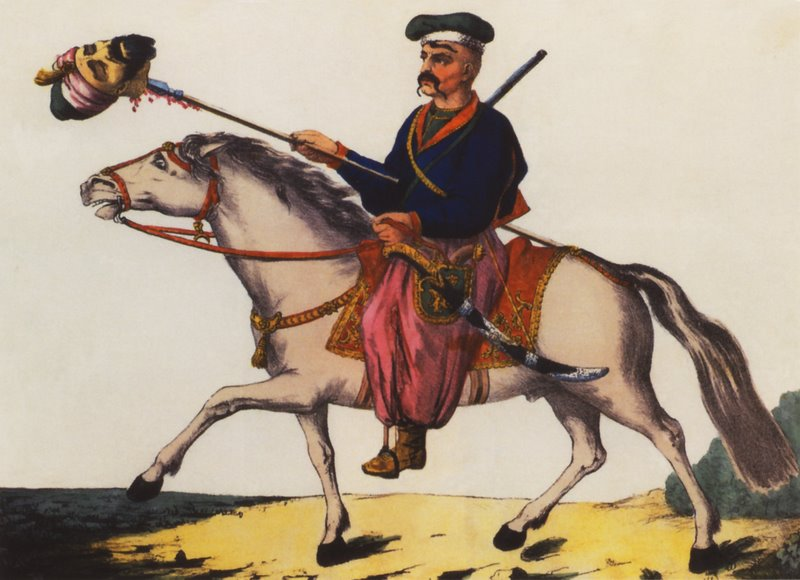
- Cossack with a head of a Tatar
Date	October 1667
Location	Crimea
Result	Cossack victory
Territorial changes	Sack of Kaffa and Arbautuk

Belligerents
Zaporozhian Cossacks	Crimean Khanate

Commanders and leaders
Ivan Sirko; Ivan Zhdan-Rih	Adil Giray; Shirin Bey; Chimasov (POW); Y. Atamesh (POW); A.G Saltan (AWOL)

Strength
2,000–4,000	Unknown

Casualties and losses
Unknown	5,000+ killed 3,500+ captured(Cossack claim)
- 1,500 Tatar civilians were captured and 2,000 killed in Kaffa; Thousands of Tatar civilians killed in other settlements

The Crimean campaign was a military expedition undertaken by the Zaporozhian Cossacks under Kosh otaman Ivan Sirko in October 1667 against the Crimean Khanate, resulting in a Cossack victory.

== Prelude ==
Ivan Sirko had a dispute with the Sich Cossacks, but he returned to the Sich to plan his campaign and gather Cossacks for it. Sirko found it easy to fall into conflict with Sich Cossacks, yet just as easy to reconcile afterwards. He promised the Cossacks they would reclaim what was 'stolen from our own people' and would exact revenge for the devastation caused by Tatar raids on their lands. Sirko saw this as a perfect opportunity to devastate Crimea while a large portion of the Tatar army was busy assisting Doroshenko in his war with Poland-Lithuania.

== Campaign ==
Ivan Sirko and Ivan Zhdan-Rih led their Cossacks into Crimea. They captured Perekop, looting and burning it. Afterward, Sirko and Zhdan divided their forces into two groups of 2,000 Cossacks each. Zhdan headed to the west of Crimea, while Sirko went east. Zhdan devastated the western regions, while Sirko laid waste to the east before advancing on Kaffa, the residence of Shirin Bey. Sirko then devastated Kaffa and Shirin Bey's lands.

Khan Adil Giray was in a panic and fled to Anatolia (modern-day Turkey). The Tatars, equally panicked, fled from their settlements to the mountains, hoping to avoid the Cossacks wrath. The Cossacks, however, chose not to head to Bakhchysarai (the Crimean capital). Their concern was getting their path out of Crimea blocked by Tatar reinforcements or allies, which would have left them too deep within Crimea to escape promptly.

The Cossacks, with loot and captives, were leaving Crimea and reached Perekop. However, Khan Adil Giray reorganized with his Tatar army and entered into battle with Sirko's Cossack army. The Tatar army suffered a crushing defeat, and the Khan was again forced to flee. Chimasov, Yenakay-Atamesh, and the others were captured. The Tatar commander Alib-Girey-Saltan fled in panic. During the campaign, the Cossacks killed over 5,000 Tatar troops and captured more than 500. After devastating the Tatar settlements, the Cossacks returned to the Sich.

== Massacres and captives ==
The Cossacks extensively plundered Crimea, particularly in the North, where they reportedly left "nothing but cats and dogs." This looting was accompanied by massacres of Tatar civilians; accounts suggest no one survived in Arbautuk, and Tatars in other settlements who did not flee to the mountains were also killed. Several thousand Tatar men were massacred. While the exact number of victims is unknown, it's believed that the Cossacks killed 2,000 Tatar civilians and captured 1,500 Tatar women and children in Kaffa alone. Among those captured were Shirin Bey's 7-year-old son and mother. The Cossacks also freed 2,000 Rus' captives from Kaffa.

== Aftermath and impact ==
After defeating Tatar reinforcements at Perekop, the Cossacks returned to the Sich. Tsar Alexis of Russia sent a letter of commendation to Sirko for his victory over the Tatars, delivered by Captain Vasyl Sukhorukov.

Sirko's campaign into Crimea played a crucial role in the outcome of the Battle of Podhajce. Upon receiving news of the Cossack devastation of Crimea, the Tatars assisting Doroshenko during the siege abandoned him and departed for Crimea.

== See also ==
- Crimean campaign (1575)
- Battle of Kaffa (1616)
- Crimean campaign (1675)
