= Kaffa massacre =

- Part of the Crimean Campaign (1667)
- Location: Kaffa, Crimea
- Date: October 1667
- Target: Crimean Tatars
- Attack type: Massacre, slavery, looting
- Deaths: 2,000
- Victim: 1,500 enslaved
- Perpetrators: Zaporozhian Cossacks, Ivan Sirko
- Motive: Retaliation for the Crimean-Nogai raids, Tatarophobia, Islamophobia

The Kaffa massacre or Sack of Kaffa took place during the Crimean campaign in October 1667, after Cossack capture of Kaffa and subsequent sacking of it, during which 3,500 Tatar civilians fell victim to the Cossacks.

== Background ==
Cossacks often took part in raids and campaigns against the Ottoman Empire, Crimean Khanate and Nogai Horde, with the desire to acquire loot, captives and deterring the Tatar raids. Zaporozhian Cossacks were the most active in their raids and campaigns into Crimea in the 1660s and 1670s under command of Ivan Sirko. Italian Dominican missionary d’Ascoli noted the brutality of Cossack activities, describing the process of Cossacks capturing cities, which was accompanied by looting, massacres and enslavement of the population. One of such campaigns was the Crimean campaign in October 1667, which was accompanied by Cossack looting and massacres of Tatar settlements.

=== Motive ===
Before Ivan Sirko launched his campaign, he made a speech to Cossacks, in which he talked about taking revenge on Tatars for their raids and his negative sentiment towards Tatars. Sirko's doctrine was described as "staunchly anti-Muslim".

== Massacre ==
When the campaign begun, he ravaged through Eastern Crimea with his 2,000 Cossacks and reached Kaffa city, where Crimean lord Shirin Bey lived. Shirin Bey was unable to prevent Cossacks from capturing the city and Tatar troops were unable to put up a sufficient resistance, suffering heavy losses.

After Cossacks captured Kaffa, they plundered the city, taking property, herd and other possessions with them. Cossacks massacred 2,000 Tatar civilians, reportedly "cut everyone down". Cossacks took 1,500 Tatar women and children with them as captives. Among the captives were Shirin Bey's 7-year-old son and mother. Cossacks also freed 2,000 Rus' captives from Kaffa.

== Aftermath ==
Crimea was severely plundered by Cossacks, with Northern Crimea suffering the most. Cossacks took part in the same brutal actions in other Tatar settlements, defeating Tatar reinforcements before returning to the Sich with loot and captives.
