= List of battles of the Polish–Russian War (1654–1667) =

Map of the main campaigns

This is a list of battles of the Polish–Russian War (1654–1667).

Periodisation:

- 18 January 1654 (Pereiaslav Agreement) – 6 August 1657 (death of Bohdan Khmelnytsky): sometimes still considered part of the Khmelnytsky Uprising; see the List of battles of the Khmelnytsky Uprising.
- May 1654 – November 1655: Tsar Alexei's campaign of 1654–1655.
  - May 1654 – October 1655: Ivan Zolotarenko's Belarusian campaign.
  - Early 1654 – November 1655: Bohdan Khmelnytsky's Galician campaign.
- 3 November 1656 – September 1658: Truce of Vilna. (Note: Direct hostilities between the Tsardom of Russia and the Polish–Lithuanian Commonwealth ceased during the Truce of Vilna. From 1656 to 1658, the Tsardom was allied with the Commonwealth, and they were co-belligerents against the Swedish Empire during this phase of the Swedish Deluge. In this period, some states and factions allied with Tsardom continued to wage battles with the Commonwealth, or vice versa. For example, during March – July 1657, the Transylvanian campaign the into Poland, supported by the Cossack Hetmanate of Bohdan Khmelnytsky (despite the 1655 Ozerna agreement obliging him to militarily assist the Commonwealth instead), the Swedish Empire and Moldavia, in June briefly succeeded in capturing the Commonwealth's capital Warsaw and installing George II Rákóczi as an anti-king to John II Casimir Vasa. However, the Tsardom was allied with the Commonwealth at the time, and it was not directly involved in this 1657 campaign; therefore, such campaigns and battles are excluded from the list.)
- 21 September 1658 — 17 October 1659: Muscovite–Ukrainian war (1658—1659).
  - Ivan Vyhovsky's Cossacks were pro-Commonwealth; Yurii Khmelnytsky's Cossacks were pro-Tsardom (until October 1660).
- November 1663 – March 1664: John II Casimir's Moscow campaign
- Right-bank uprising (1664–1665)

Date Old Style (Note: In the 17th century, the difference between Old Style and New Style dates was 10 days, with the Gregorian calendar (New Style) being 10 days ahead of the Julian calendar (Old Style). The Polish–Lithuanian Commonwealth officially adopted the Gregorian calendar in 1582, and the civil and secular authorities adopted it, but this was resisted by Orthodox churches as well as predominantly Orthodox Cossack communities in Ukraine and Belarus, who kept using the Julian calendar (until March 1918 in the Ukrainian People's Republic and Belarusian People's Republic). In Russia, where the Byzantine Anno Mundi calendar was still common, the Julian calendar was not adopted until 1700, and then retained until February 1918 in Bolshevik Russia. Sweden did not adopt the Gregorian calendar until 1753. The resulting date differences in primary sources and later literature could sometimes cause confusion. (The Crimean Khanate and Ottoman Empire continued using the Hijri calendar throughout the war, although the Ottomans adopted a Julian-derived fiscal calendar in 1677).) (Julian calendar)	Date New Style (Gregorian calendar)	Battle	Front	Commonwealth forces	Tsardom forces	Notes
2–4 April 1654		Siege of Uman	Right-Bank Ukraine	Commonwealth forces Crimean Khanate	Khmelnytsky's Cossacks	Khmelnytsky victory
	25 June 1654	Battle of Nowa Woda	Smolensk	Lithuanian Army	Tsardom Army	Commonwealth victory
6 July – 16 September 1654		Siege of Smolensk	Smolensk	Commonwealth forces	Tsardom Army; Zolotarenko's Cossacks	Tsardom victory
June – 13 August 1654	June – 27 August 1654	Siege of Gomel	Belarus; Zolotarenko	Commonwealth forces	Zolotarenko's Cossacks	Zolotarenko victory
8–12 July 1654	18–22 July 1654	Siege of Mstsislaw	Belarus; Trubetskoy	Commonwealth forces	Tsardom Army	Tsardom victory Trubetskoy massacre
2 August 1654	12 August 1654	Battle of Shklow	Belarus	Commonwealth forces	Tsardom Army	Indecisive; Lithuanian tactical victory
	24 August 1654	Battle of Shepeleviche	Belarus; Trubetskoy	Commonwealth forces	Tsardom Army	Tsardom strategic victory Lithuanian tactical victory
	29 August – 26 November 1654	1st Siege of Stary Bykhaw	Belarus; Zolotarenko	Commonwealth forces	Zolotarenko's Cossacks	Commonwealth victory
August – 22 October 1654	August – October 1654	Siege of Dubrovno	Belarus; Trubetskoy	Commonwealth forces	Tsardom Army	Tsardom victory Sack of city
14 August – 22 November 1654	24 August – 2 December 1654	Siege of Vitebsk	Belarus; Zolotarenko	Commonwealth forces	Tsardom Army; Zolotarenko's Cossacks	Tsardom victory Inhabitants deported
14–19 January 1655		Siege of Uman	Right-Bank Ukraine; Galician	Commonwealth forces Crimean Khanate	Khmelnytsky's Cossacks	Khmelnytsky victory
29 January – 1 February 1655	19 January – 22 January 1655	Battle of Okhmativ	Right-Bank Ukraine; Galician	Commonwealth forces Crimean Khanate	Tsardom Army; Khmelnytsky's Cossacks	Indecisive, or Commonwealth-led victory
12 February — 11 May 1655	2 February – 1 May 1655	Siege of Mogilev	Belarus; Zolotarenko	Commonwealth forces	Tsardom Army; Zolotarenko's Cossacks	Tsardom-led victory
29 July 1655	7 August 1655	Battle of Vilnius	Lithuania; Zolotarenko	Commonwealth forces	Tsardom Army; Zolotarenko's Cossacks	Tsardom-led victory Sack of Vilnius
mid-May – 17 October 1655		2nd Siege of Stary Bykhaw	Belarus; Zolotarenko; Trubetskoy	Commonwealth forces	Zolotarenko's Cossacks; Tsardom Army	Commonwealth victory Death of Zolotarenko
September 1655	September 1655	Siege of Slutsk	Belarus; Zolotarenko	Commonwealth forces	Tsardom Army; Zolotarenko's Cossacks	Commonwealth victory
15 September – 30 October 1655	25 September – 8 November 1655	Siege of Lviv	Right-Bank Ukraine; Galician	Commonwealth forces	Tsardom Army; Khmelnytsky's Cossacks	Commonwealth victory
19 September 1655	29 September 1655	Battle of Horodok (Note: Gródek Jagielloński.)	Right-Bank Ukraine; Galician	Commonwealth forces	Tsardom Army; Khmelnytsky's Cossacks	Tsardom-led victory
7 November 1655	17 November 1655	Battle of Verkhovichi	Belarus	Commonwealth forces	Tsardom Army	Tsardom victory
10–12 November 1655	20–22 November 1655	Battle of Ozerna	Right-Bank Ukraine; Galician	Commonwealth forces Crimean Khanate	Tsardom Army; Khmelnytsky's Cossacks	Indecisive; Commonwealth diplomatic victory (Note: The battle was inconclusive. However, the Tsardom troops were released for ransom, and forced to retreat. Bohdan Khmelnytsky signed a treaty obligating him to provide military assistance to the Commonwealth, and sever his relations with the Tsardom. All spoils captured by the Tsardom Army and Khmelnytsky's Cossacks were handed to the Crimean Khanate.)
24 October 1656 – September 1658	3 November 1656 – September 1658	Truce of Vilna	(everywhere)	–	–	Truce between Tsardom and Commonwealth forces
11 October 1658	21 October 1658	Battle of Verkiai (Note: Werki.)	Lithuania	Commonwealth forces	Tsardom Army	Tsardom victory
23–24 August 1658	2–3 September	Siege of Kyiv	Right-Bank Ukraine	Vyhovsky's Cossacks; Crimean Khanate	Tsardom Army	Tsardom victory
September 1658	September 1658	Skirmish at Mhlyn	Bryansk	Vyhovsky's Cossacks	Tsardom Army	Vyhovsky victory
20 September 1658	30 September 1658	Battle of Vasylkiv	Right-Bank Ukraine	Vyhovsky's Cossacks; Crimean Khanate	Tsardom Army	Tsardom-led victory
November 1658	November 1658	Sack of Chornukh	Left-Bank Ukraine	Vyhovsky's Cossacks	Tsardom Army; Tsarist Cossacks	Tsardom victory Sack of city
	7 November 1658 – 20 February 1659	Siege of Kaunas	Lithuania	Commonwealth forces	Tsardom Army	Tsardom victory
7–30 November 1658	17 November – 7 December 1658	Siege of Varva	Left-Bank Ukraine	Commonwealth forces Crimean Khanate; Vyhovsky's Cossacks	Tsardom Army; Bezpaly's Cossacks	Tsardom-led tactical victory
8 February 1659		Battle of Myadel (Note: Myadzyel, Miadzioł.)	Belarus	Commonwealth forces	Tsardom Army	Tsardom victory
13 April 1659	23 April 1659	Battle of Sribne	Left-Bank Ukraine	Vyhovsky's Cossacks	Tsardom Army	Tsardom victory Sribne massacre
14 May – 4 December 1659		3rd Siege of Stary Bykhaw	Belarus	Vyhovsky's Cossacks	Tsardom Army; Tsarist Cossacks	Tsardom victory
May 1659	May 1659	Sack of Trypillia	Right-Bank Ukraine	Vyhovsky's Cossacks	Tsardom Army	Tsardom victory Sack of city
27 May 1659		Battle of Nizhyn	Left-Bank Ukraine	Vyhovsky's Cossacks; Crimean Khanate	Tsardom Army; Bezpaly's Cossacks	Vyhovsky-led victory
1–15 June		Siege of Hlukhiv	Left-Bank Ukraine	Vyhovsky's Cossacks	Tsardom Army	Vyhovsky victory
7–12 June 1659		Battle of Hovtva	Left-Bank Ukraine	Vyhovsky's Cossacks	Tsardom Army	Vyhovsky victory
29 June 1659	9 July 1659	Battle of Konotop	Left-Bank Ukraine	Vyhovsky's Cossacks; Commonwealth forces Crimean Tatars	Tsardom Army; Yurii's Cossacks	Vyhovsky victory
16 November 1659	26 November 1659	Battle of Khmilnyk	Right-Bank Ukraine	Commonwealth forces Vyhovsky's Cossacks	Tsardom Army; Somko's Cossacks	Tsardom-led victory
29 December 1659 – 4 January 1660		Siege of Brest	Belarus	Commonwealth forces	Tsardom Army	Tsardom victory
January 1660	February 1660	Siege of Mohyliv– Podilskyi	Right-Bank Ukraine	Commonwealth forces Vyhovsky's Cossacks; Crimean Khanate	Tsardom Army; Tsarist Cossacks	Tsardom-led victory
23 March – 28 June 1660		Siege of Lyakhavichy	Belarus	Commonwealth forces	Tsardom Army	Commonwealth victory
28 June 1660		Battle of Polonka	Belarus	Commonwealth forces	Tsardom Army	Commonwealth victory
mid-July – early August 1660		Siege of Barysaw	Belarus	Commonwealth forces	Tsardom Army	Tsardom victory
10 August – 4 October 1660	20 August – 24 September 1660	Siege of Mogilev (Note: Mohylew, Mahilyow.)	Belarus	Commonwealth forces	Tsardom Army; Khmelnytsky's Cossacks	Tsardom-led victory
14–25 September 1660	4–15 September 1660	Battle of Lyubar	Right-Bank Ukraine; Chudniv	Commonwealth forces Crimean Khanate; Vyhovsky's Cossacks	Tsardom Army; Tsytsyura's Cossacks	Commonwealth-led victory
16 September 1660	26 September 1660	Battle of Kutyszcze	Right-Bank Ukraine; Chudniv	Commonwealth forces Crimean Khanate; Vyhovsky's Cossacks	Tsardom Army; Tsytsyura's Cossacks	Commonwealth-led victory
17 September – 25 October 1660	27 September – 4 November 1660	Battle of Chudniv (Note: Cudnów, Chudnov.)	Right-Bank Ukraine; Chudniv	Commonwealth forces Crimean Khanate	Tsardom Army; Tsetsyura's Cossacks	Commonwealth-led victory Treaty of Chudniv
27 September 1660	7 October 1660	Battle of Slobodyshche	Right-Bank Ukraine; Chudniv	Commonwealth forces Crimean Khanate	Khmelnytsky's Cossacks	Indecisive; Commonwealth tactical victory
8 October 1660		Battle of the Basya River	Belarus	Commonwealth forces	Tsardom Army	Indecisive
1 February 1661	11 February 1661	Mogilev Uprising	Belarus	Local rebels (pro-Commonwealth)	Tsardom garrison	Commonwealth victory Revolt succeeded
February 1661	1661	Battle of Druya	Belarus	Commonwealth forces	Tsardom Army	Tsardom tactical victory
25 October 1661	4 November 1661	Battle of Kushliki	Belarus	Commonwealth forces	Tsardom Army	Commonwealth victory
Early October – December 1661		1st Siege of Pereiaslav	Left-Bank Ukraine	Khmelnytsky's Cossacks; Commonwealth forces Crimean Khanate	Tsardom Army; Somko's Cossacks	Tsardom-led victory
	July 1660 – 3 December 1661	Siege of Vilnius	Lithuania	Commonwealth forces	Tsardom Army	Lithuanian victory
16 May 1662	26 May 1662	Battle of Chausy	Belarus	Commonwealth forces	Tsardom Army	Tsardom victory
12 June – 10 July 1662		2nd Siege of Pereiaslav	Left-Bank Ukraine	Khmelnytsky's Cossacks; Commonwealth forces Crimean Khanate	Tsardom Army; Somko's Cossacks	Tsardom-led victory
10 July 1662	26 July 1662	Battle of Kaniv	Right-Bank Ukraine	Khmelnytsky's Cossacks; Commonwealth forces	Tsardom Army; Somko's Cossacks	Tsardom-led victory
3 August 1662	13 August 1662	Battle of Buzhyn	Right-Bank Ukraine	Crimean Khanate; Khmelnytsky's Cossacks	Tsardom Army; V. Zolotarenko Cossacks	Crimean-led victory
11 October – 16 December 1663		Siege of Perekop	Crimea	Crimean Khanate; Ottoman Janissaries	Sirko's Sich Cossacks; Don Cossacks; Tsardom Army; Kalmyk Khanate	Sirko-led victory
November 1663 – March 1664		John II Casimir's; Moscow campaign	Muscovy	Commonwealth forces Right-Bank Cossacks; Crimean Khanate	Tsardom Army; Left-Bank Cossacks	Tsardom-led victory
23 December 1663 – 12 January 1664	1 January – 22 January 1664	Siege of Roslavl	Smolensk	Commonwealth forces	Tsardom Army	Tsardom victory
13 January – 30 January 1664	23 January – 9 February 1664	Siege of Hlukhiv (Note: Głuchów.)	Left-Bank Ukraine	Commonwealth forces Bohun's Cossacks; Crimean Khanate	Tsardom Army; Briukhovetsky's Cossacks	Tsardom-led victory
18 February — 21 February 1664	28 February – 2 March 1664	Battle of Pyrohivka	Left-Bank Ukraine	Commonwealth forces	Tsardom Army; Briukhovetsky's Cossacks	Tsardom-led victory
11 March 1664	21 March 1664	Battle of Drokov	Bryansk	Lithuanian Army	Tsardom Army	Tsardom victory
6 June 1664	16 June 1664	Battle of Vitebsk	Belarus	Commonwealth forces	Tsardom Army	Tsardom strategic victory Commonwealth tactical victory
24 September 1664	5 October 1664	Battle of Chashniki	Belarus	Commonwealth forces	Tsardom Army	Tsardom victory
January 1664 – January 1665	1664–1665	Right-Bank Uprising	Right-Bank Ukraine	Commonwealth forces Crimean Khanate; Vyhovsky's Cossacks; Teteria's Cossacks	Briukhovetsky's Cossacks; Sirko's Sich Cossacks; Tsardom Army; Kalmyk Khanate	Commonwealth-led strategic victory; Briukhovetsky-led tactical victory
7–13 April 1664		Siege of Buzhyn	Right-Bank Ukraine	Commonwealth forces	Briukhovetsky's Cossacks; Sich Cossacks; Tsardom Army	Briukhovetsky-led victory
July 1664		Battle of Saradzhyn	Right-Bank Ukraine	Commonwealth forces Crimean Khanate	Sirko's Cossacks; Kalmyk Khanate	Commonwealth tactical victory
28 June – 30 September 1554; January 1665	7 July – 7 October 1664; January 1665	Battle of Stavyshche	Right-Bank Ukraine	Commonwealth forces Crimean Khanate	Local rebels (anti-Commonwealth)	Commonwealth-led victory Revolt suppressed Sack of town (1655)
	September 1665 (Note: [The units of] Prince Ivan Khovansky, Governor of Pskov, [had] already been spotted in August in the vicinity of Druja, after which they withdrew to the right bank of the Daugava, but on 4 September, in pursuit of Lithuanian volunteers, they once again marched southwards and, following the Battle of Ilūkste, forced the Lithuanians to retreat as far as Drisvjati (Dryświaty). (...) Khovansky avoided battle and, as early as 12 September, began his retreat towards Opočka (...). Despite a fierce pursuit by the Lithuanian cavalry, Khovansky managed to retreat as far as Pskov.")	Battle of Ilūkste	Latvia	Lithuanian volunteers	Tsardom Army	Tsardom tactical victory
	17 September 1665 – 17 June 1666	Siege of Daugavpils (Note: Not to be confused with the July 1656 Siege of Dyneburg, after which the Tsardom captured Daugavpils (Dyneburg) and renamed it Borisoglebsk. The old name was restored in 1667.)	Latvia	Commonwealth forces	Tsardom Army	Tsardom Pyrrhic victory Commonwealth diplomatic victory (Note: The garrison withstood the siege, but on 31 January 1667, the Tsardom renounced its claims to Daugavpils and gave it back to the Commonwealth at the conclusion of the Treaty of Andrusovo, Article 3 of which read that the Muscovite state would cede Polatsk, Vitsebsk, Daugavpils, Ludza, Rēzekne and Viļaka ‘together with the whole of southern Livonia’. The Muscovites were to vacate the aforementioned territories by 11 March 1667.)
8 March 1666	18 March 1666	Battle of Daugavpils	Latvia	Commonwealth forces	Tsardom Army	Tsardom tactical victory
9 June 1666 – c. March 1667	19 June 1666 – c. March 1667	Pereiaslav revolt	Left-Bank Ukraine	Pereiaslav Regiment; Doroshenko's Cossacks; Crimean Khanate	Tsardom Army; Briukhovetsky's Cossacks	Tsardom-led victory Revolt suppressed
30 January 1667	9 February 1667	Truce of Andrusovo	(everywhere)	–	–	Peace

== See also ==
- List of battles of the Khmelnytsky Uprising (1648–1657)
- List of battles of the Great Northern War (1700–1721)
- List of battles of the French invasion of Russia (1812, largely in Belarus)

== Bibliography ==
- Halushka, Andriy Anatoliyovych (2013). "Чуднівська кампанія 1660" [Chudniv campaign 1660]. Encyclopedia of History of Ukraine (in Ukrainian). Vol. 10. Kyiv: Institute of History of Ukraine. p. 580–581. Archived from the original on 9 June 2024.
- Hrytskievich, Anatol (2005). "Вайна Расіі з Рэччу Паспалітай 1654—67" [War of Russia with the Commonwealth 1654–1667]. Grand Duchy of Lithuania: Encyclopedia (in Belarusian). Vol. 1. Minsk: Piatrus Brouka Belarusian Encyclopedia. Archived from the original on 9 September 2026.
- Bobiatyński, Konrad (2011). Polijas-Lietuvas cīņa ar Maskavas valsti par Daugavpili 17. gadsimta 60. gados [The Polish-Lithuanian struggle with the Muscovite state over Daugavpils in the 1660s] (PDF) (in Latvian). Institute of Latvian History, University of Latvia. pp. 66–77.
