= Siege of Mstsislaw =

Siege of Mstsislaw Trubetskoy massacre
- Part of the Polish–Russian War (1654–1667) and The Ruin
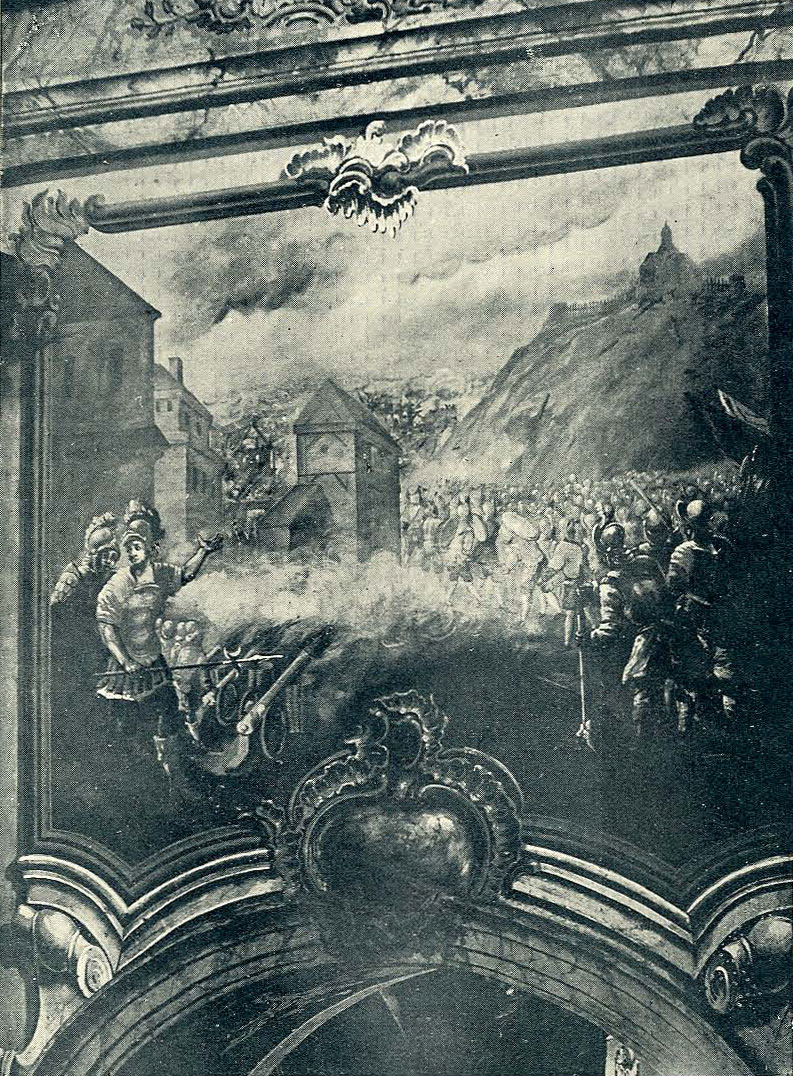
- Fresco in Mstsislaw's Carmelite Church: the Muscovites capture the castle
Date	18 – 22 July 1654
Location	Mstsislaw, modern Belarus
Result	Russian victory Massacre of 15,000 inhabitants

Belligerents
Grand Duchy of Lithuania	Tsardom of Russia

Commanders and leaders
	Aleksey Trubetskoy

The Siege of Mstsislaw (Note: Mstsislaw is known by many spellings, including but not limited to Belarusian: Мсціслаў, romanized: Mscislaŭ, Taraškievica Belarusian: Амсьціслаў, romanized: Am'scislaŭ, IPA: [msʲt͡sʲiˈsɫau̯]; Russian: Мстиславль, IPA: [msʲtʲɪˈslavlʲ]; Polish: Mścisław, Lithuanian: Mstislavlis; Yiddish: אָמטשיסלאוו, romanized: Omtchislav, Amtchislav.) took place between 18 and 22 July 1654 in the opening stages of the Polish–Russian War (1654–1667). Upon conquering the Lithuanian-Belarusian city, the Russian forces of Aleksey Trubetskoy proceeded to kill most of the inhabitants (about 15,000 people) in what has become known as the Trubetskoy massacre (Belarusian: Трубяцкая разня, romanized: Trubyatskaya raznya).

== Background ==
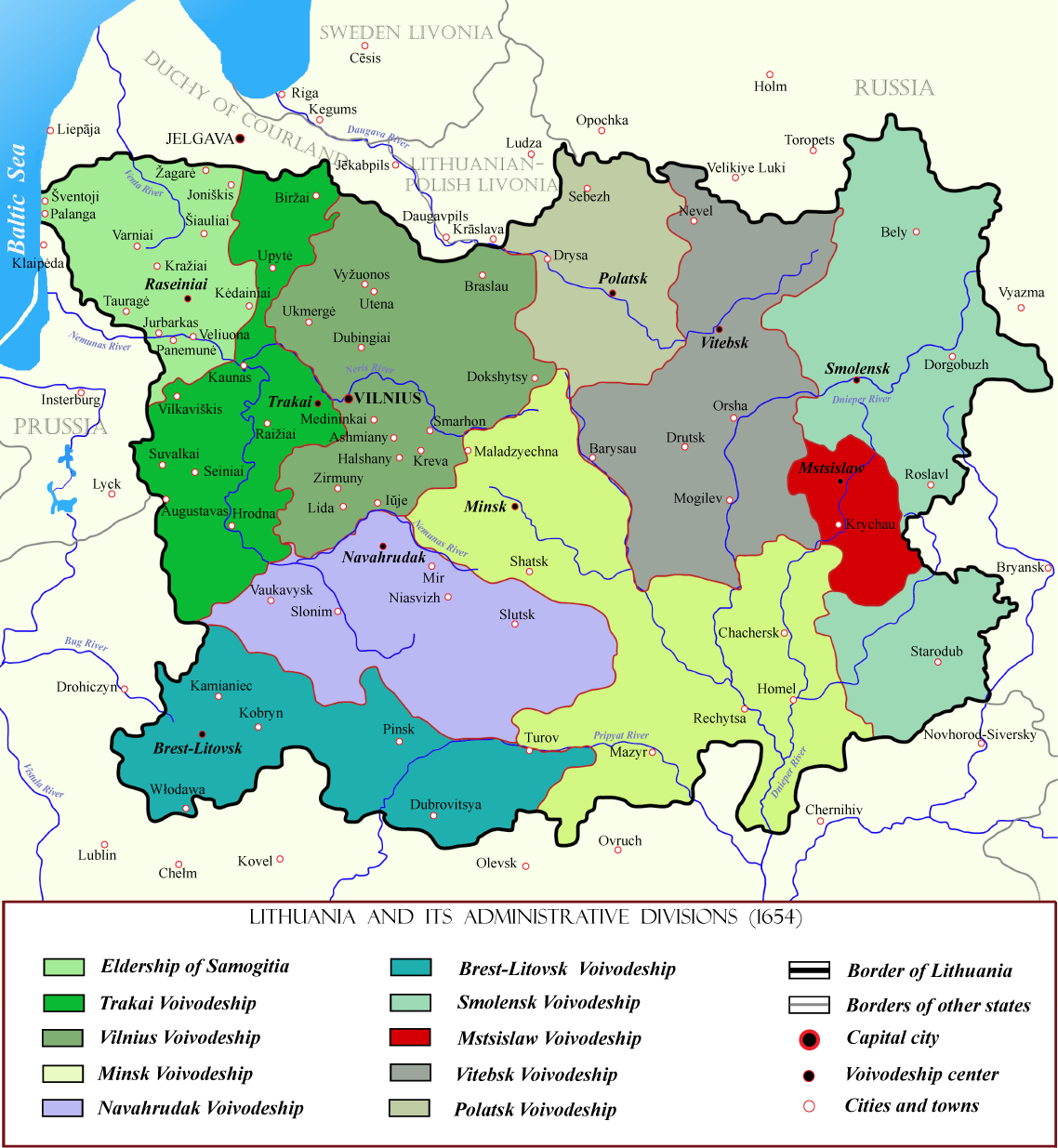
Mstsislaw Voivodeship

On 18 January 1654, the Pereiaslav Agreement was concluded between Bohdan Khmelnytsky on behalf of the Cossack Hetmanate and Vasiliy Buturlin on behalf of tsar Alexis of Moscow. The Hetmanate thereby effectively became a protectorate of the tsar, although still with extensive autonomy, in return for military assistance against the Polish–Lithuanian Commonwealth.

The main objective of the military campaign waged by the Muscovite forces was to capture the Grand Duchy of Lithuania east of the river Biarezina. The campaign began in May 1654.

- The main army led by tsar Alexis proceeded from Moscow and marched along the Dnieper to Smolensk. The Siege of Smolensk (1654) began on 6 July (lasting until 16 September 1654), and tied up most of the invading Russian army. The main army was joined by about 20,000 Cossacks under Ivan Zolotarenko.
- The northern army led by Vasily Petrovich Sheremetev advanced into northern Belarus, capturing several fortresses and towns: Polatsk on 27 or 30 June, Dzisna and Druya at the turn of July and August, and Strzeszniew on 20 August.
- The southern army led by Aleksey Trubetskoy proceeded from Bryansk, already captured Roslavl without a fight in June, and the next target of the offensive was Mstsislaw. Thereafter, they would reach the Dnieper in the vicinity of Shklow. The Tsar assumed that this corps was intended to support the Cossacks in their advance towards Volhynia, and then to launch an attack towards Lublin.

== Siege ==
Mstsislaw was the capital of the Mstsislaw Voivodeship and an important centre of trade. During the initial phase of hostilities in the 1654 campaign, the imbalance in forces was offset by the resolute defence of numerous fortresses by the troops of the Grand Duchy of Lithuania. The provincial capital featured a wooden castle with 10 towers and a timber-and-earth rampart with wooden gate towers. The fortress was further reinforced by deep moats, many of which were natural in origin. The defence consisted of many nobles and citizens, who had prepared in advance. The defenders rejected the offer of surrender and decided to defend themselves until a relief army from Lithuania would arrive.

Although the fortifications had just been modernised in the 1630s, they could not withstand a multi-day intensive artillery bombardment, and caught fire. In addition, a considerable number of the garrison fled the town under the pretext of a sortie.

Four days later, on 22 July, Trubetskoy's troops entered the town and carried out a massacre of the population. At that time, 15,000 people lost their lives. 700 craftsmen, who were needed by the Muscovite state, were spared; they were later resettled in the interior of Russia.

== Aftermath ==
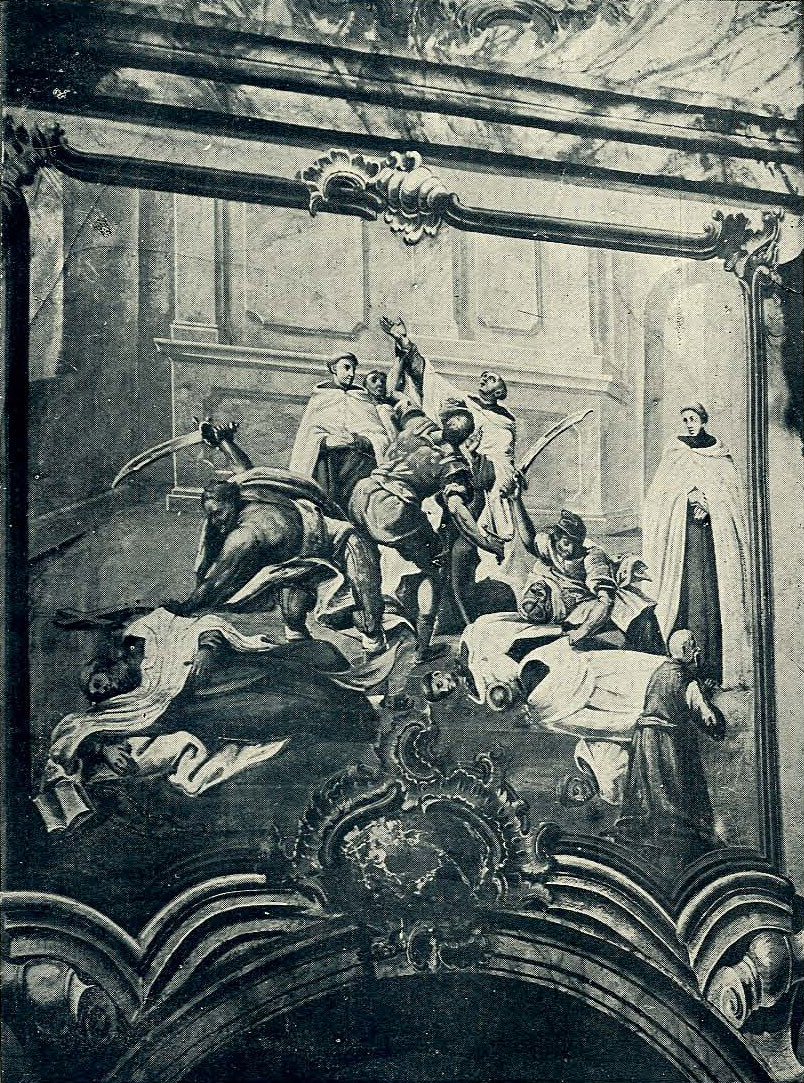
Fresco in Mstsislaw's Carmelite Church: the Muscovites massacre the civilians

The massacre earned Trubetskoy the nickname of "the Butcher of Mstsislaw". Similar attacks on civilians would happen upon the capture of towns such as Dzisna (Dysna), Kletsk, Pinsk and Slonim, while many inhabitants of Minsk and Grodno (Hrodna) would flee to Lithuania and Poland.

The capture of Mstsislaw enabled Russian troops to reach the Dnipro in the Mahilyow–Orsha area, which threatened numerous towns situated on the left bank of the Dnipro. Crossing the Dnipro opened up the possibility of advancing to the Biarezina near Barysaw and threatening the enemy in Minsk.

== Literature ==
- Augustyniak, Urszula (2008). Historia Polski, 1572-1795. Warsaw: Wydawnictwo Naukowe PWN. ISBN 978-83-01-15592-6.
- Hrytskievich, Anatol (2005). "Вайна Расіі з Рэччу Паспалітай 1654—67" [War of Russia with the Commonwealth 1654–1667]. Grand Duchy of Lithuania: Encyclopedia (in Belarusian). Vol. 1. Minsk: Piatrus Brouka Belarusian Encyclopedia. Archived from the original on 9 September 2026.
- Bobiatyński, Konrad (2004). Od Smoleńska do Wilna: wojna Rzeczypospolitej z Moskwą 1654-1655 (in Polish). Zabrze: Wydawnictwo Infort Editions. ISBN 83-89943-00-X.
- Terleckas, Vladas (3 July 2010), Forgotten by History: The First Mass Murders and Deportations of Lithuanians, translated by Valiukėnas, Delija, archived from the original on 9 September 2026
- Wisner, Henryk (2000). Janusz Radziwiłł 1612-1655: Wojewoda wileński, Hetman Wielki Litewski [Janusz Radziwiłł 1612–1655: Voivode of Vilnius, Grand Hetman of Lithuania]. Warsaw: Mada. p. 269. ISBN 8386170484.
