= Siege of Mogilev (disambiguation) =

The siege of Mogilev was a three-week encirclement of Mogilev by German troops during World War II

Siege of Mogilev may also refer to:

- Siege of Mogilev (1655) by Lithuanian forces during the Russo-Polish War (1654–1667).
- Siege of Mogilev (1660) by Polish-Lithuanian forces during the Russo-Polish War (1654–1667).

== See also ==
- Battle of Mogilev
