= Battle of Kaniv =

Battle of Kaniv may refer to:

- Battle of Kaniv (1662) — victory of Russians and Left-Bank Zaporozhian Cossacks against Yuri Khmelnytsky - see Kaniv#History
- Battle of Kaniv (1918) — victory of Germans against Poles
