= Battle of Vitebsk (1664) =

1664 battle of the Russo–Polish War (1654–1667)

- Part of the Russo-Polish War (1654–1667)
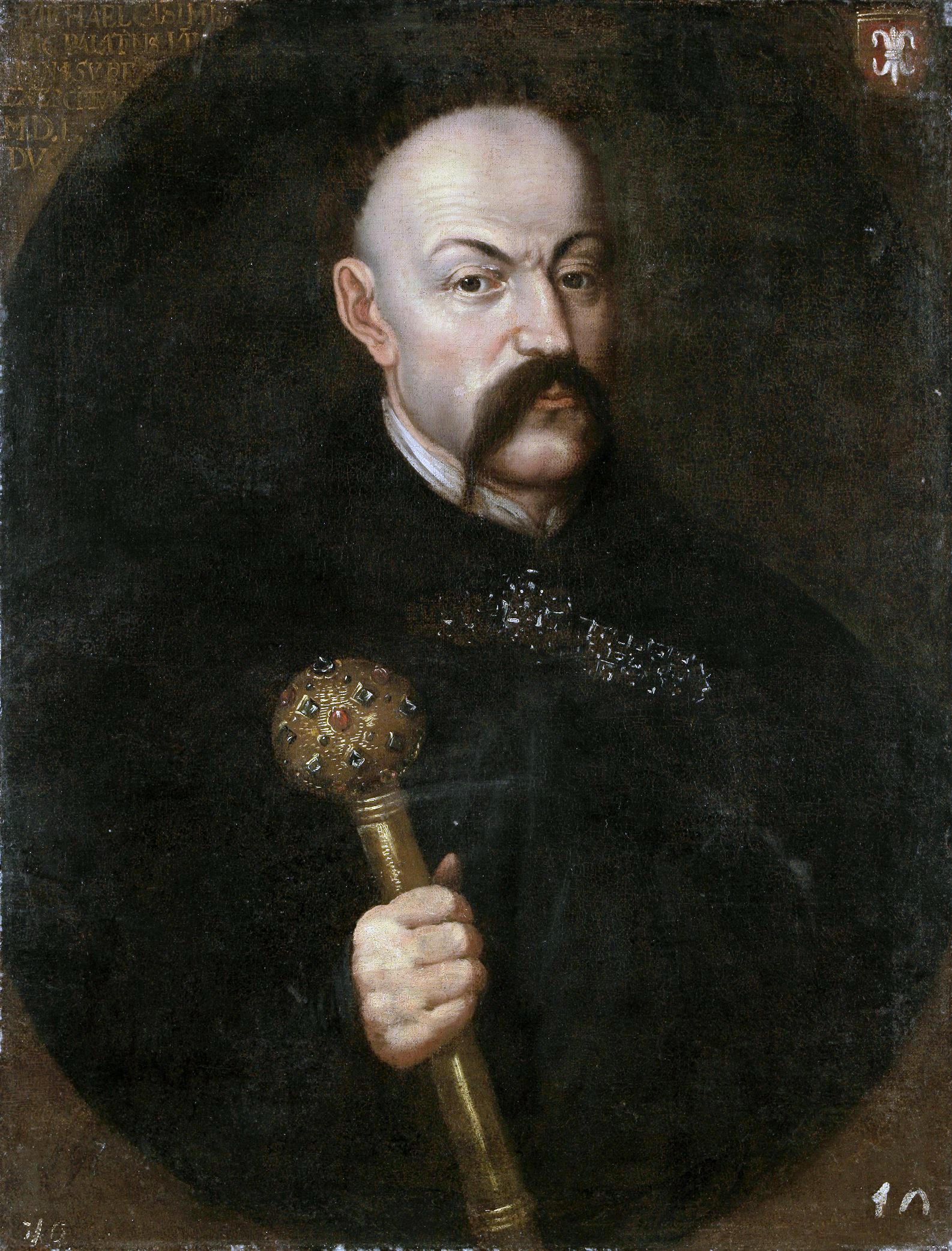
- Michał Kazimierz Pac
Date	5–6 June 1664
Location	Vitebsk
Result	Polish–Lithuanian victory

Belligerents
Polish–Lithuanian Commonwealth	Tsardom of Russia

Commanders and leaders
(Polish–Lithuanian Commonwealth) Michał Kazimierz Pac	(Tsardom of Russia) Ivan Nikitich Khovansky

Strength
About 3,000 troops	3,749 or 5,000–6,000 troops

Casualties and losses
Unknown	Unknown

The Battle of Vitebsk, part of the Russo–Polish War of 1654–1667, took place on 5–6 June 1664 near Vitebsk. It was fought between the Polish–Lithuanian Commonwealth led by Michał Kazimierz Pac against the Tsardom of Russia led by Ivan Nikitich Khovansky. It ended with a Polish–Lithuanian victory.

== Prelude ==
During the Khmelnytsky Uprising, the Pereiaslav Agreement was signed between the Cossack Hetmanate and the Tsardom of Russia in January 1654. The Russo–Polish War began right after (partially due to the Pereiaslav Agreement), with the Russians having a force entering the Polish–Lithuanian Commonwealth with a force of 40,000. It started with the Battle of Shklow, which ended up inconclusive (although victory is claimed by both sides). Janusz Radziwiłł was defeated at the Battle of Shepeleviche right after where he became wounded (and then retreated to Minsk). The Russians then managed to take Smolensk (in the Siege of Smolensk), which they had failed to take in the earlier Smolensk War. The Russians continued to rapidly advance towards the Vistula. Vitebsk, along with Polotsk had similar importance to Smolensk lost in 1664, leading to the battle.

== Battle ==
The Russians gathered near Vitebsk, feeding themselves by bringing food and "collecting fodder" on the spot until summer. On the c. 5th of June, the first clashes occurred. On 6 June, the main battle broke out. At first, Khovansky had managed to capture the Hetman Banner of Kazimierz Pac, although what followed this event was a repulsed Russian attack on the Polish–Lithuanian convoy, due to the Russian cavalry not attacking with infantry support, causing them to be overturned. Many of Khovansky's horsemen didn't just retreat the camp, but went home from the battlefield. The regiments of Khovansky, greatly thinned by desertion, who had almost only infantry left, were defeated by Kazimierz Pac's army.

== Aftermath ==
The Russian failure led to change of command: Prince Yu. A Dolgorukov replacing Khovansky. Although Khovansky had lost the battle, his campaign had a negative impact on John II Casimir. Pursued by Russian troops, the Polish army continued their difficult retreat after the Siege of Hlukhiv.

== Bibliography ==
- Stevens, Carol Belkin (1995), Soldiers on the steppe: army reform and social change in early modern Russia, Illinois: Northern Illinois University Press
- Bobiatyński, Konrad Artur (2008), Kampania letnia 1664 roku na terytorium Wielkiego Księstwa Litewskiego – nieznany fragment wojny Rzeczypospolitej z Moskwą 1654–1667, [w:] Wojsko, wojskowość, miasta...
