= Battle of Buzhyn (1662) =

- Part of Russo-Polish War (1654–1667) and The Ruin
Date	13 August 1662
Location	Buzhyn,(Modern day Ukraine)
Result	Cossack–Tatar victory

Belligerents
Russia; Cossack Hetmanate	Crimean Khanate; Cossack Hetmanate

Commanders and leaders
Grigory Romodanovsky (Tsardom of Russia) Mikhail Priklonsky; Vasyl Zolotarenko	Mehmed IV Giray; Selim I Giray; Yurii Khmelnytsky

Strength
4,900 to 8,000 Russians; 5,000 Cossacks	20,000 Crimean Tatars; 5,000 Cossacks

Casualties and losses
Almost entire army (Ukrainian estimate) 286 Russians killed and wounded	Unknown

The Battle of Buzhyn was a battle between Russo-Cossack army and army of Khmelintskiy's coalition fought on August 13, 1662, an parts of the Russo-Polish War (1654–1667) and the Ukrainian Ruin (1657–1687). The army of the Crimean Tatars and the Right-Bank Cossacks of Yurii Khmelnytsky forced to retreat tsarist troops and the Left-Bank Cossacks, stopping their advance into Right-Bank Ukraine.
