= Sieges of Pereiaslav =

Siege of Pereiaslav
- Part of Russo-Polish War (1654–1667) and The Ruin
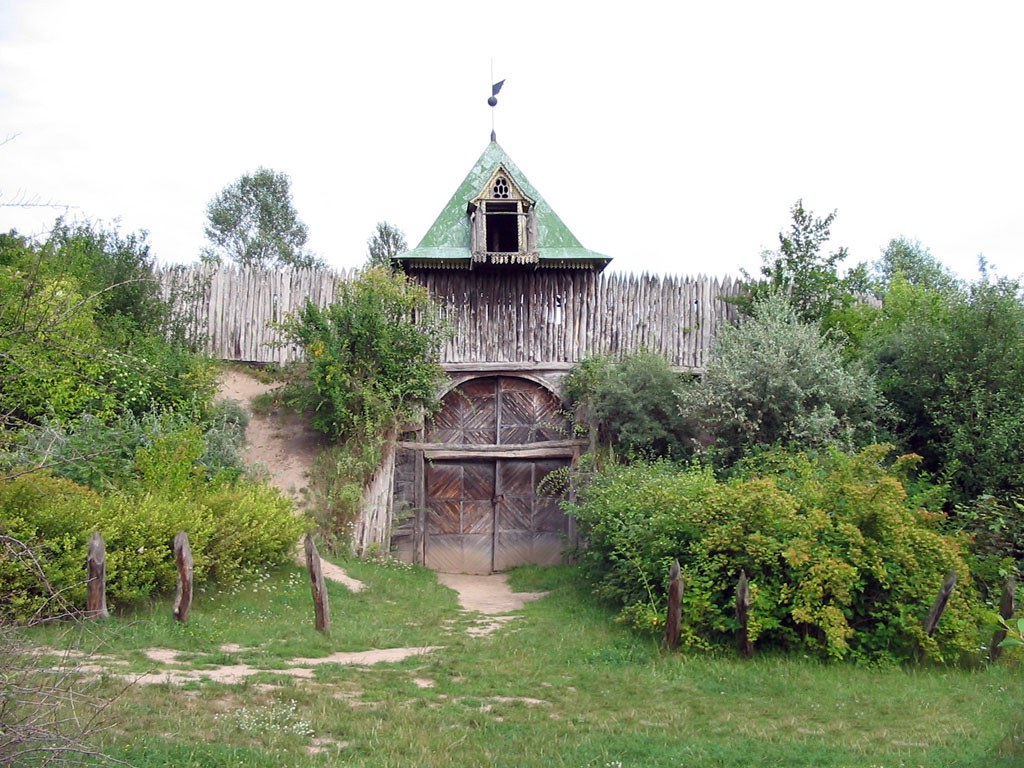
- A 17-18 century Cossack fortress in Pereiaslav
Date	1661–1662
Location	Pereiaslav, (Modern day Ukraine)
Result	Russian victory

Belligerents
Polish-Lithuanian Commonwealth; Cossack hetmanate Crimean Khanate	Russia; Cossack hetmanate

Commanders and leaders
Yuri Khmelnitsky	Prince Vasily Bogdanovich; Yakym Somko

Strength
First siege: Unknown Second siege: 14,000	3,519

The sieges of Pereiaslav in 1661–1662 are episodes of the Ruin and the Russo-Polish War of 1654–1667.Yuri Khmelnitsky, the Hetman of Right-Bank Ukraine, who went over to the side of the Polish-Lithuanian Commonwealth, twice attempted to take Pereiaslav, which was defended by his uncle, Yakym Somko, who led the Left-Bank opposition to Khmelnitsky, and a garrison of tsarist troops led by Prince Volkonsky-Verigin.

== Background ==
Yuri Khmelnitsky, having signed the Treaty of Chudnov with the Poles, faced opposition to his foreign policy from the Left Bank regiments, led by Pereiaslav Colonel Yakim Somko. By 1661, the Hetmanate was divided along the Dnieper into two conflicting factions. Seeking to consolidate power, Khmelnitsky enlisted the help of the Crimean Tatars and Poles to capture Pereiaslav.

== Sieges ==
=== Siege of 1661 ===
In the beginning of October 1661, Yuri Khmelnytsky laid siege to Pereiaslav, this time the siege would last 2 months. Khmelnytsky, having gathered a large army consisting of Cossacks and Tatars, tried to drain the Trubizh and the Alta river. The forces of Khmelnytsky would constantly come in small numbers from five hundred to a thousand people, who would be used as lure to draw enemy troops into the open, where they could be ambushed by larger armies concealed in the forests. Ultimately, Khmelnytsky, failing to reach success from the siege, lifted the siege.

=== Siege of 1662 ===
On June 12, Khmelnitsky advanced on Pereyaslav. The city was defended by approximately 4,000 tsarist troops and 3,000–4,000 Cossacks from the Pereyaslav regiment, who were expecting reinforcements from Colonel Vasily Zolotarenko. Khmelnitsky's forces from 14,000. (Note: Including around 14,000 men from nine right-bank regiments, 2,000 Crimean Tatars, and Polish cavalry) As Khmelnitsky attacked Somko's fortified positions near the Borisoglebsky Monastery, he faced fierce resistance from Somko's Cossacks, who fought valiantly. Despite multiple assaults, on July 10, Khmelnitsky fled with all his people to Kanev.

== Consequences ==
While retreating, a unified army of Somko and Romodanovsky followed and defeated Khmelnytsky in a devastating battle near Kanev.
