= Army of the Tsardom of Russia =

Army of Tsardom of Russia
- Войско Русского государства (Russian)
- Founded: 15th century
- Disbanded: 1682
- Headquarters: Moscow

Related articles
- History: Military history of Russia; Muscovite–Lithuanian Wars; Russo-Kazan Wars (1439–1552); Russo-Livonian War (1480–1481); Smolensk War (1632–1634)

Army of the Tsardom of Russia (Russian: Армия Русского государства) known also as the Forces of the Russian State (Russian: Войско Русского государства) and as Forces of Muscovy (Russian: Войска московского государства) were the armed forces of the Tsardom of Russia, formerly the Principality of Moscow.

== Historical background ==
The Grand Duchy of Moscow was the successor to the Grand Duchy of Vladimir, which, in turn, was one of the principalities into which Kievan Rus' broke up. It is customary to consider the history of the armed forces of the principality from the middle of the 13th century (although Moscow replaced Vladimir as the political center of North-Eastern Rus' in the second half of the 14th century). This is due to the Mongol invasion, which led to a regression in the economy and, as a result, the armed organization of Rus' - primarily due to the repeated devastation of cities during the second half of the 13th century - the trade and craft centers of North-Eastern Russia, as well as the establishment from 1259 years of the Mongol Empire (then the Golden Horde) control over the Volga trade route connecting Central Asia with Northern Europe. In particular, foot arrows as a kind of weapon (arms), traced in Rus' since the end of the 12th century, cease to be mentioned after 1242, and the importance of the bow in horse squads increases again. The new eastern danger only supplemented the previous ones, so Rus' faced the prospect of solving more complex tasks at the expense of fewer resources compared to the previous period of its history. So, for example, from 1228 to 1462, Armies of Rus' participated in no less than 302 wars and campaigns, of which 200 were with external opponents.

== Structure ==
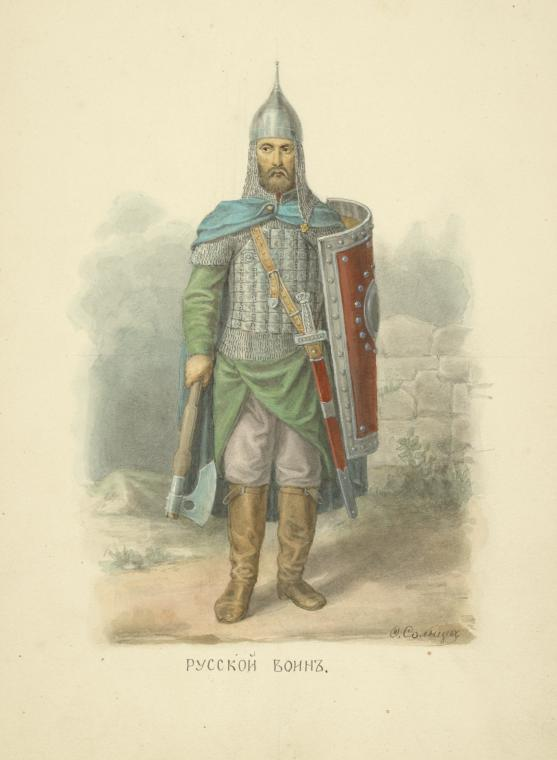
Uniform of a Russian soldier

Until the middle of the 15th century, Russian state's armed forces were decentralized and could be assembled as an improvised peasant's militia. While the Grand Prince of Moscow could call up subjects under his direct authority or subjects of other princes. Yet, the Grand Prince didn't have the power to coerce other princes to subordinate their armies to him, with a clear example in the form of the Battle of Kulikovo in 1380, when the princes of Tver, Principality of Nizhny Novgorod-Suzdal and Ryazan principalities refused to assist prince Dmitry Donskoy. The founding event which changed the balance of power and made Grand Prince Vasily II to have near-monopoly over armed forces was the civil war of 1425–1453. In according with the social composition and the fact that there was no general mandatory conscription, the majority of the Tsardom army were dvoryaniye and junior bojary (deti boyarskie). Some of the conscripted had in possession hereditary estate called votchina but most of the cavalrymen received service estate (pomeste) which were in their possession only during the time of the military service. After they finished their service, the estate returned to the state. As the army expanded, other types of soldiers were recruited and were paid with cash and they were led by the dety boyarskie or even boyars.

The basic unit of the army of the tsardom was the polk, often translated as regiment, which was commanded by Voyevoda. The types of regiments included Main Regiment, Advanced Regiment, Guard Regiment (known also as Rear or Reserve Regiment) and the Left and Right Regiments. Depends on the situation on the ground, there were also the Sovereign's Regiment (when the tsar was present in the battlefield) and Reconnaissance Regiment which helped to gather intelligence on the enemy and was placed in front of the Advanced Regiment. By the end of the 16th century, the Artillery Regiment and Transport Regiment. In 1632–1634 regiments of the new system appeared in the Tsardom. Several regiments of soldiers were formed from Russian people, in which foreigners who were in the Russian service were officers. In each regiment there were up to 1750 people, of which approximately 1600 Russians and 150 foreigners. The regiment was divided into eight companies. A Reiter regiment (heavy cavalry) of about two thousand people was formed from Russian people. This regiment consisted of 14 companies of 125–130 men each. By 1657, 11 Reiter and soldier regiments were formed in Russia. Gradually, the regiments of the new system forced out the old army. Unlike the traditional formation troops, the new regiments were outfitted and salaried at treasury expense. By 1680, the regiments of the new system accounted for up to 67% of the entire army, they numbered about 90 thousand people. These regiments had almost all the features of a regular army, they were divided into companies, the order of appointment to officer positions was determined in them, drill and tactical exercises were carried out with the personnel. However, after the campaign, the soldiers and part of the officers disbanded to their homes, the weapons were surrendered, which implies, it was still not quite a regular army.

== Command and control ==
In 1522 Vasily III made further centralization of the command system when he turned Kolomna into his headquarters for spring and autumn operations to the banks of the Oka river, between Kolomna and Kaluga which stretched for 250kkm.

By the mid of the 17th century the central government of 53 ministries (prikazy) of which 21 directly dealt with military affairs. After the 13 Years War, all but the Secret Chancellery (prikaz velikogo gosudaria tainykh del) were subordinated to the Razriad command.

== Weapons ==
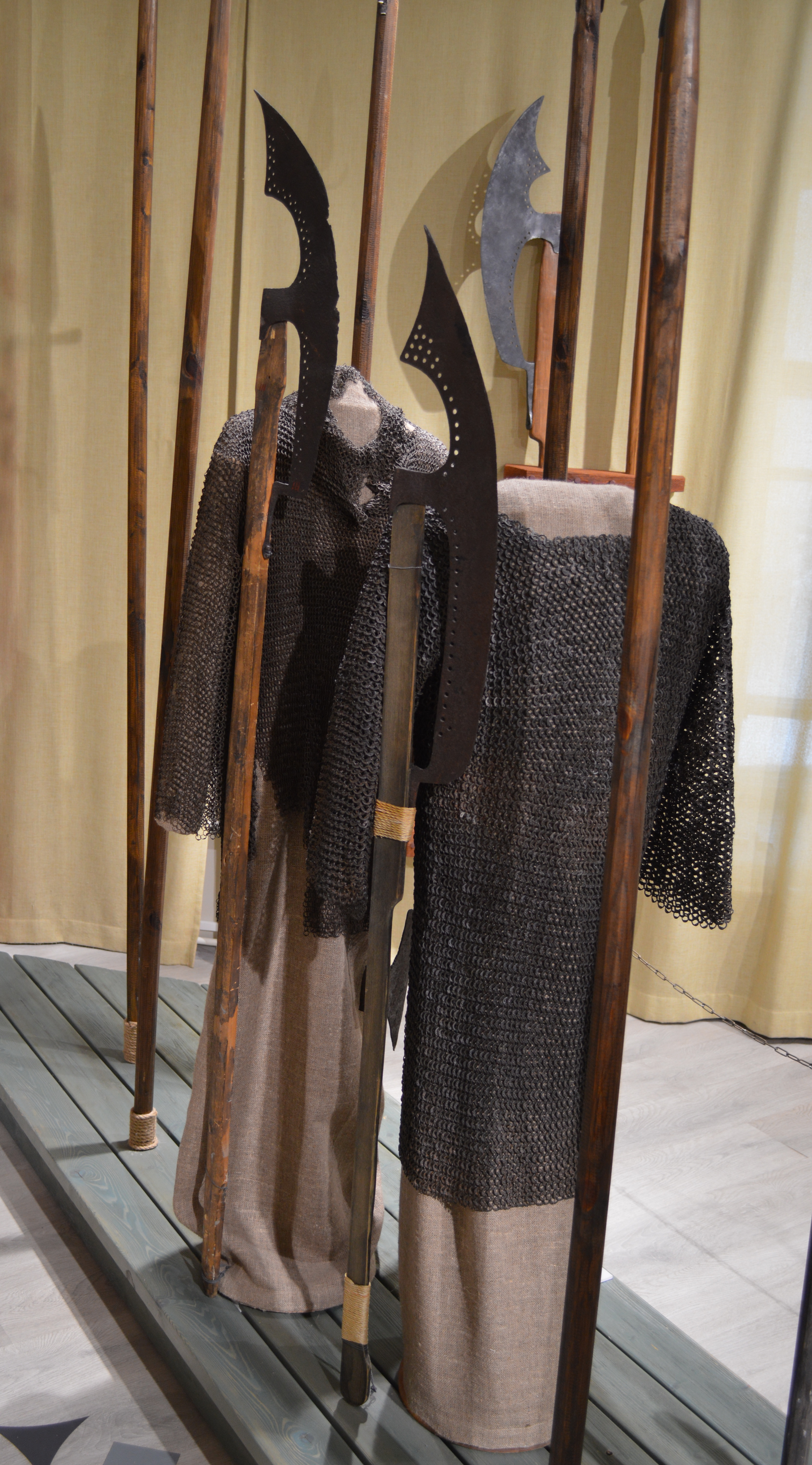
Mail armour, bardiches. Russia, 17th century

Until the middle of the 15th century, spears were the weapon of the first onslaught. Since the 16th century, their use has been revived again. As a stabbing cavalry spear, a lance with a faceted tip was used, well suited for ramming. Against cavalry in the 17th century, infantry lances were used in the regiments of the new system. More common, since the XIV century, were spears with narrow-leaved tips with an elongated triangular feather on a massive, sometimes faceted sleeve. They dealt powerful armor-piercing blows. The infantry weapon was the spears - heavy and powerful spears with a laurel tip. It was the most massive weapon. From about the 16th century, modified spears were used in the local cavalry. Another modification of the spear was the sovnya used in the infantry. Since ancient times, there have been throwing darts - sulits, with which it was possible to stab. Later, such darts, djids, were kept in special quivers, but in Rus' they were practically not used

=== Bladed weapons ===
Swords which were used in the Armies of Rus' were quickly replaced by sabers, but in the northern regions they were used longer. They were imported from Europe and were very diverse, up to two-handed ones. The main bladed weapon, at least since the 15th century, has been the saber. Sabers were used very diverse, both domestic and imported from Western Asia or Eastern Europe. Their form was also different, but mostly of the Persian or Turkish type.

=== Firearm ===
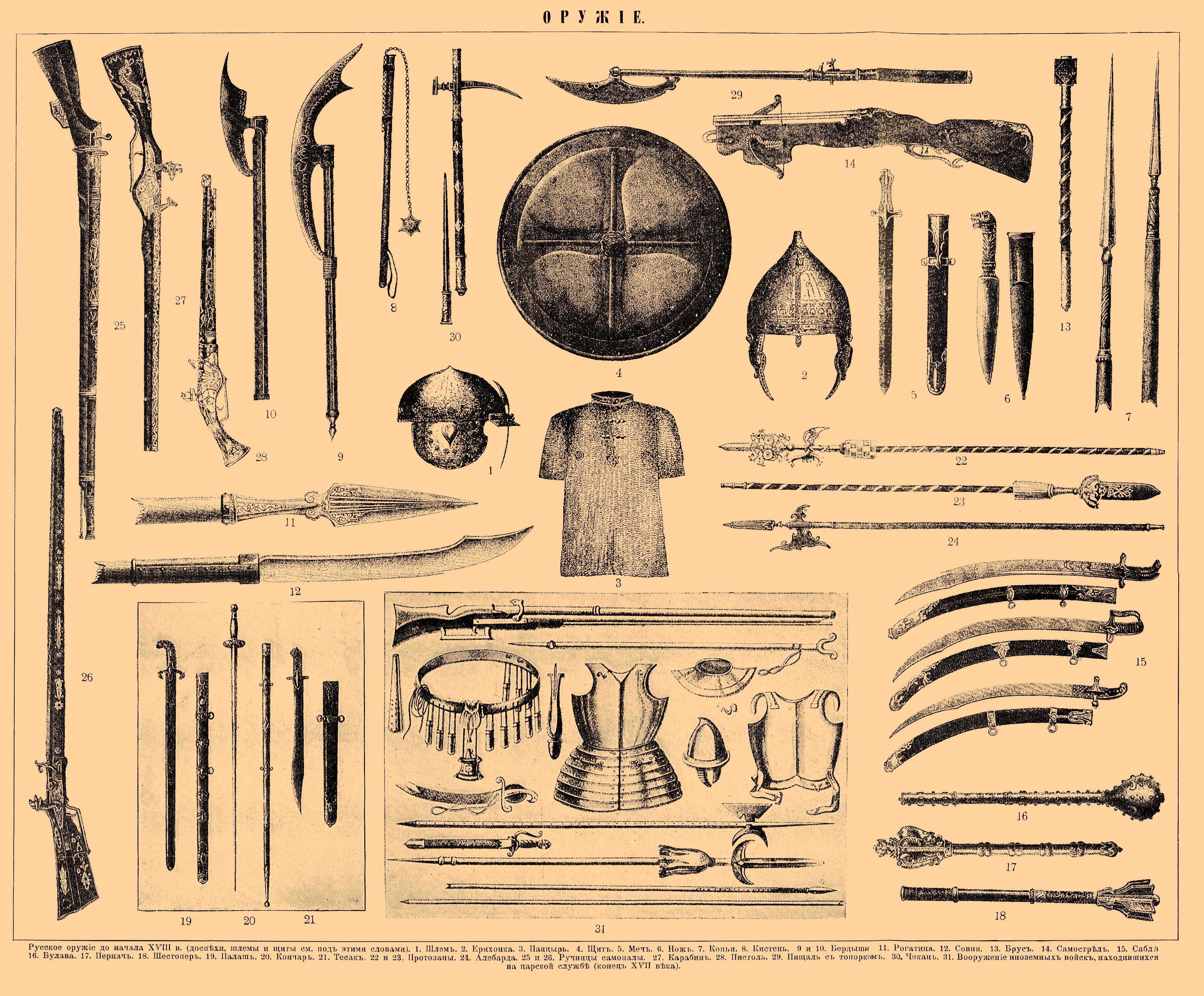
Weapons used in Russia until the beginning of the 18th century

The exact date of the appearance of firearms in Rus' is unknown, but it happened under Dmitry Donskoy no later than 1382, when they were used in the Siege of Moscow. While it is not confirmed where it came from it is known that there was Western influence as in 1389 German cannons were delivered to Tver, and in 1393 and 1410 the Germans presented copper cannons to the Grand Duke. At first, cannons were used to defend fortresses; from 1393, cannons were used in Rus' as siege weapons. Around 1400 there was local production of at least forged barrels. The guns were of various purposes and designs. For the siege of cities heavy guns were required while lighter ones for defense. For them, stone cores were mainly used. Medium and long-barreled guns were called squeakers and fired iron cannonballs. Mattresses with a conical barrel were fired with shot-cutting iron, and with a cylindrical one, for aimed firing with cannonballs. All firearms of that time were rather ineffective, therefore they were used together with crossbows and throwing machines. The first recorded case of the use of firearms in a kind of field battle refers to Great Stand on the Ugra River in 1480. At the same time, artillery on wheeled carriages (“machine tools on wheels”) was introduced. In 1475, Aristotle Fioravanti came to Moscow and helped organize a large cannon foundry, which was later attended by Greek, Italian, German, Scottish and other craftsmen. The tools were cast from copper or bronze. With the transition to standard casting, a system of calibers was developed, the total number of which in the 16th - early 17th centuries reached 30, and 70 to 100 types of guns. For this, calibration and measuring compasses were used - “circled”. Not later than 1494, the production of cast-iron cores and the Powder Yard were established in Moscow, which meant the transition from powder pulp to granulated gunpowder. The Army of the Tsardom of Russia had a large number of artillery pieces, placed among others in Staraya Ladoga, Ivangorod, Oreshek, Solovetsky Islands, Arkhangelsk, Astrakhan, Tavan', Pustozero.

=== Armour ===
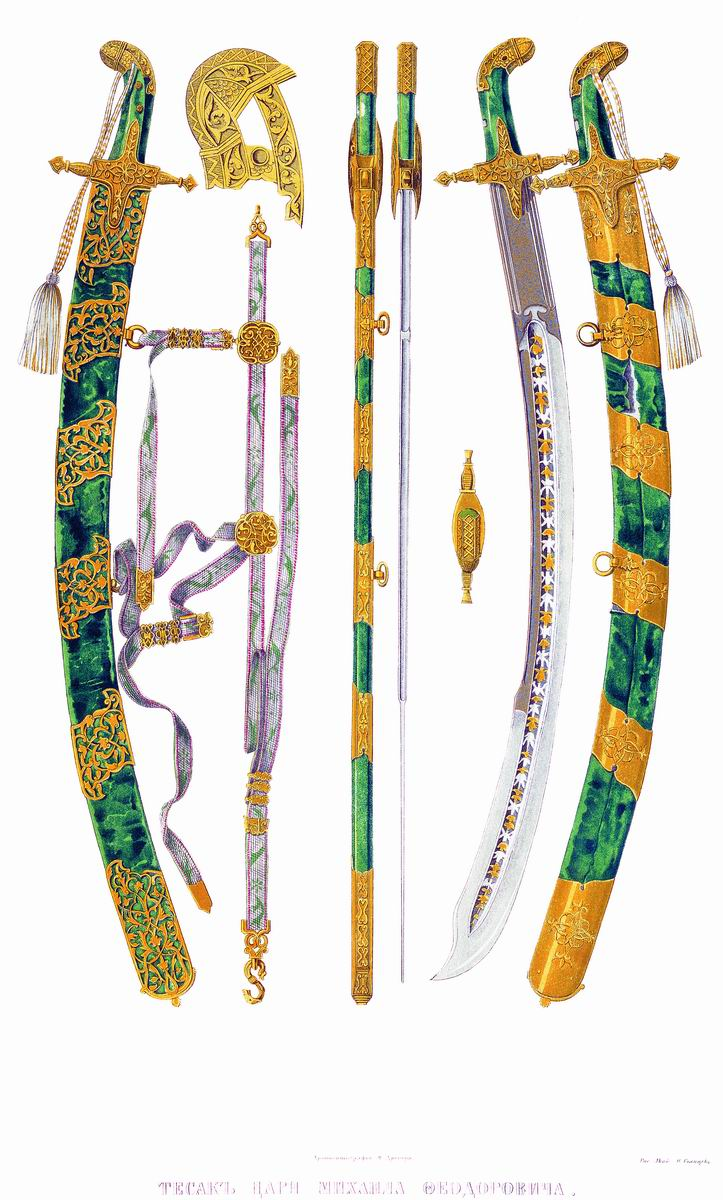
Saber of Tsar Mikhail

== Size ==
The size of the army of the Russian Tsardom in the 16th century is unknown. According to the upper estimate by the end of the century it could reach 110,000 people, of which 25,000 landowners, up to 50,000 of their people (according to a revised estimate - up to 25 thousand), 10 thousand Tatars, 20 thousand archers and Cossacks, 4 thousand foreigners. At the end of the 16th century, under Boris Godunov, the Russian army consisted of 80 thousand noble cavalry and 12 thousand infantry (including 7,000 archers), auxiliary troops from the "Cheremis" (up to 30 thousand people), and 3,000-4,000 foreigners. Some historians estimate the number between 50,000 and 100,000.

== Fortresses ==
The development of the Army in the Tsardom of Russia occurred along with the major expansion of the country's borders which made it vulnerable to attacks. In addition, the development of gunpowder created the need to have a defensive installation in which the artillery could be placed. The creation of fortresses along the southern borders of Russia, known as the Great Zasechnaya cherta, cordoned off the steppes from nomadic attacks. Among the fortress that were built, one can count Bryansk, Belgorod, Smolensk and Izyum.

== Military Revolution ==
The 16th century was a period of major changes and development, including the introduction of a new style of forces the gunpowder, in the armies in Europe, a concept known as the Military Revolution. While prior to the mid 16th century the Russian armies were made up of regional cavalry forces using cold steel, a need for a change arose when the Russian forces began fighting with modernized Baltic forces.

== See also ==
- Streltsy
- Time of Troubles
- Army of Peter the Great
