= Siege of Kyiv (1658) =

Siege

- Part of the Polish–Russian War (1654–1667)
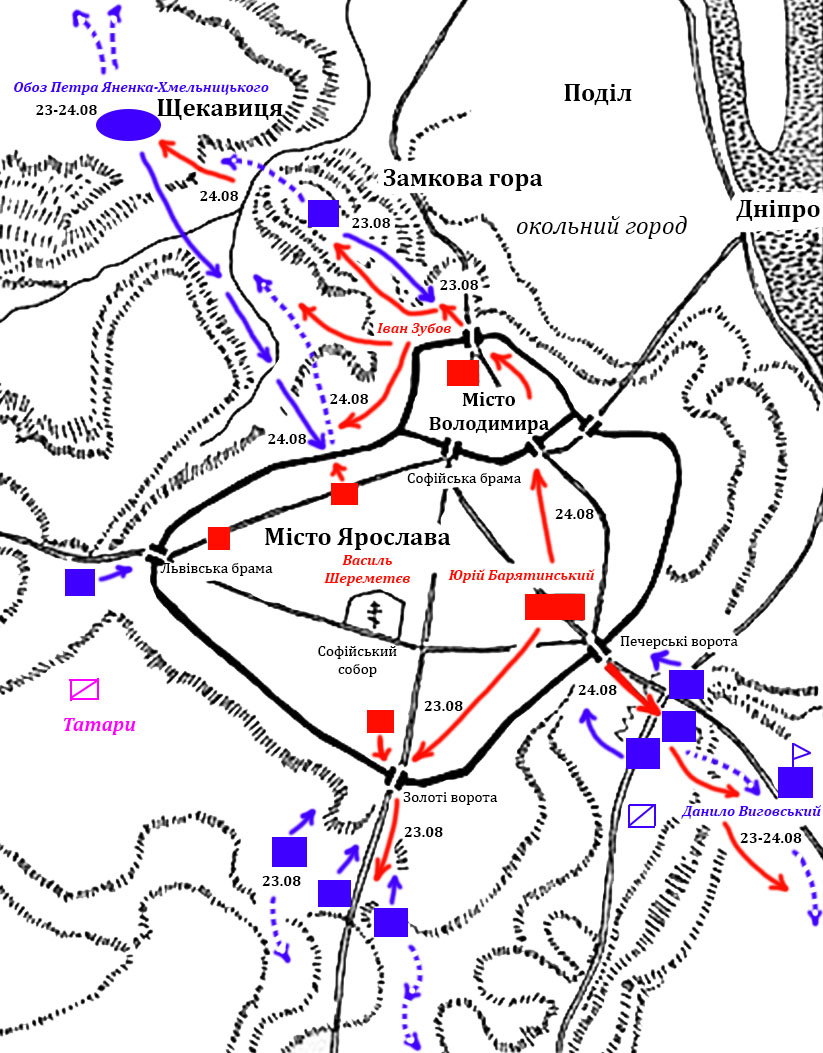
- Map of the defence of Kyiv by Sheremetyev's detachment from Vyhovsky's troops. Cossack troops Russian troops Crimean troops
Date	23–24 August 1658 O.S. 2–3 September 1658 N.S.
Location	Kyiv, Cossack Hetmanate (modern Ukraine)
Result	Russian victory
Territorial changes	Ivan Vyhovsky's plan to capture Kyiv fails

Belligerents
Cossack Hetmanate; Crimean Khanate	Russian Tsardom

Commanders and leaders
Danylo Vyhovsky; Pavlo Yanenko-Khmelnytsky; Vasyl Vyhovsky (surrendered)	Vasily Sheremetev; Yury Baryatinsky

Strength
21,500	6,075

Casualties and losses
15,000 casualties (Note: Including deserters); 47 banners 9 or 20 cannons	21 killed, 109 wounded

Siege of Kyiv (Note: Russian: Осада Киева; Ukrainian: Облога Києва) or Defence of Kyiv (Note: Russian: Оборона Киева) was a siege of Kyiv by Cossack Hetmanate troops led by Danylo Vyhovsky, whose garrison was commanded by the Russian Commander Vasily Sheremetev. As a result of the battle, Russian troops repelled the Cossack regiments and successfully defended Kyiv.

== Background ==
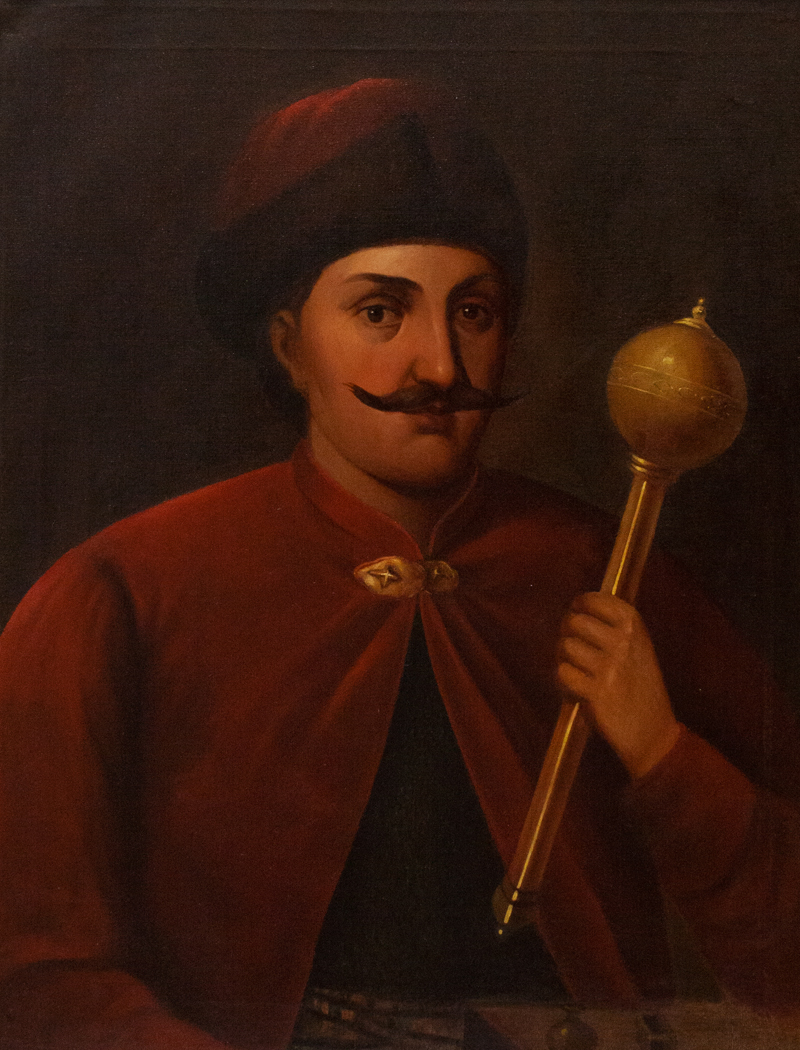
Hetman Ivan Vyhovsky of Ukraine

After the death of Bohdan Khmelnytsky, Ivan Vyhovsky was elected the new hetman of Ukraine. Vyhovsky continued Khmelnytsky's policies of building an independent or at least autonomous Cossack state, balancing between the Polish-Lithuanian Commonwealth and the Russian Tsardom. Tsar Alexis of Russia, who promised to protect the Cossacks by the 1654 Pereiaslav Agreement and March Articles, had abandoned the Ukrainians in late 1656 by signing the separate Truce of Vilnius with the Commonwealth, deliberately excluding the Cossacks from the negotiations. The Cossack leadership felt that Moscow had violated the Pereiaslav Agreement and had betrayed Ukraine, and thus Khmelnytsky and Vyhovsky set out to explore alternatives and establish other alliances to secure their homeland. Negotiations resulted in alliances with Transylvania in late 1656, and with the Swedish Empire by the Treaty of Korsun in October 1657. Although that treaty explicitly stated in Article 1 that "the Zaporizhian Host refuses to take up arms against the Grand Prince of Moscow", Alexis nevertheless accused the Cossacks of violating the Pereiaslav Agreement. Meanwhile, promises of the Polish king John Casimir to make certain concessions to the Cossack Hetmanate allowed the Cossack leadership to consider making peace with the Commonwealth; these negotiations would later result in the Treaty of Hadiach in September 1658.

Vyhovsky also renewed the “brotherly union of Cossacks and Tatars” and secured the support of the talented Crimean commander Karach-Bey.

On 30 July 1658, a council was held in Chyhyryn at which a decision was taken to go to war against the Muscovite state, which was interfering ever more brazenly in Ukrainian affairs.

Already on 5 August, Ivan Vyhovsky openly declared that he would soon send army to Kyiv, which had housed a Muscovite garrison since 1654 at Khmelnytsky's request to protect the city from Commonwealth attempts to retake it.

There was a garrison of 6,075 in Kyiv, and it was besieged by a much larger army. The Muscovite garrison commander Vasily Sheremetev himself wrote that he was probably besieged by an army of 100,000, which included 40,000 Cossacks and 60,000 Tatars. Modern historiography has estimated the number of besiegers at 21,500.

== Battle ==
=== First day ===
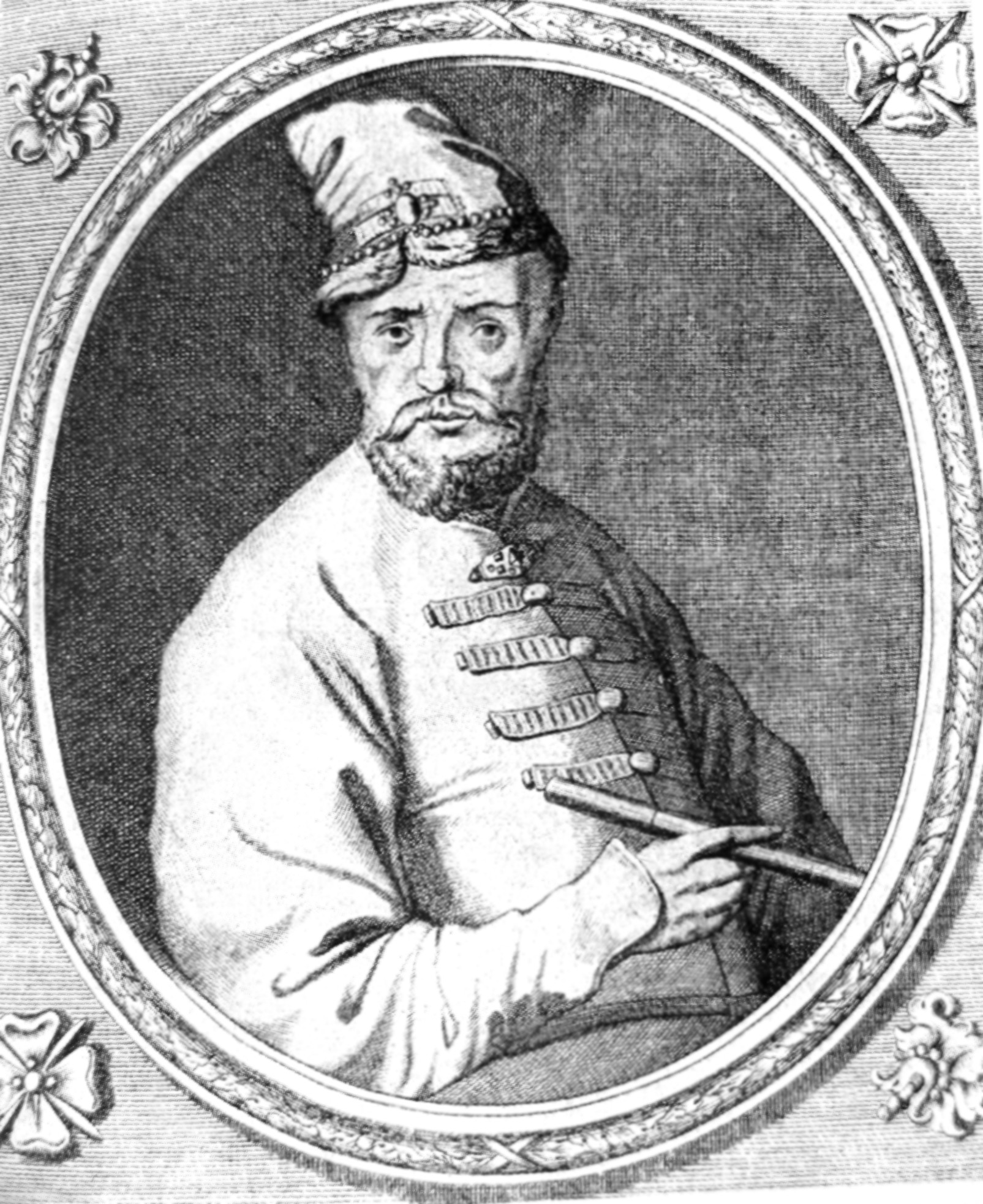
Commander of the Russian garrison Vasily Sheremetev

On 16 August O.S. (26 August N.S.), soldiers sent into the forest ran to Kyiv and reported to Sheremetev that they had been attacked by Cossacks. The colonel sent mounted patrols forward and they confirmed that Cossack regiments were moving from the south to Kyiv. The number of troops near Kyiv gradually increased and by evening Vyhovsky himself arrived with the Cossacks and Tatars.

On 23 August, Danylo began the assault on the city without the hetman's order. Russian troops repelled the Cossacks' attacks and even made a sortie from the golden gate, the Russians started fighting. At the same time, the city was attacked by the Cossacks of Pavlo Yanenko-Khmelnytsky, Colonel of the Kyiv Regiment. Allegedly, he had sworn allegiance and promised to enter the battle on the Russian side; Sheremetev later wrote: “all his words were lies”. On the other hand, Yanenko–Khmelnytsky participated in the Cossack Rada of 27 August / 5 September 1657 which elected Vyhovsky, and he faithfully served Vyhovsky thereafter. Nevertheless, Sheremetev successfully used artillery and sent his riflemen against the Cossacks.

Zamkova Hora (Castle Hill) was taken by storm, and the battle that broke out in the south also ended in success for the Russians. However, this was only the first stage of the battle, on the orders of Danylo, Cossacks dug in to the southeast of the city, opposite the Pechersk gates.

=== Second day and battle near Vasylkiv ===
At this time, Prince Baratinsky's detachment attacked the main forces of the Cossacks at the Battle of Vasylkiv (1658) on 20 (30) September 1658. And they fled, many people died, 47 banners and several cannons or 20 cannons were taken, the hetman's brother Vasyl Vyhovsky was captured, together with him the Russians received the Hetman's mace, which is still kept in the armory of Moscow.

In parallel, the Kyiv colonel Yanenko-Khmelnytsky again attacked the city walls. A successful defence allowed Russians to gain time, thanks to which Baryatin, who had just defeated Danylo's troops, also put Yanenko's regiment to flight.

== Aftermath ==
Sheremetev managed to eliminate the threat of the capture of the main fortress on the Dnieper. The large army of Danylo Vyhovsky was scattered, and the hetman himself fled from the battlefield.

== Bibliography ==
- Malov, A. (2006). Русско-Польская война 1654-1667 гг. [Russo-Polish War 1654-1667] (in Russian). Moscow. ISBN 5-94038-111-1.
- Babulin, I. (2015). Борьба за Украину и битва под Конотопом (1658-1659) [The struggle for Ukraine and the battle of Konotop (1668-1669)] (in Russian). ISBN 978-5-903389-99-5.
- Berh, Vasiliy (1831). Царствование Алексея Михайловича [The Reign of Alexei Mikhailovich] (in Russian). Saint-Petersburg: Типография Гинце.
- Velikanov, Vladimir S.; Lazarev, Yakov A. (2020). Царские воеводы и гарнизоны на Украине 1654-1669 [Tsarist voevodes and garrisons in Ukraine 1654-1669] (in Russian). Russian Academy of Sciences: Ratnoe delo. Moscow: Русские витязи. ISBN 978-5-907245-00-6.
- Kryvosheya, Volodymyr Volodymyrovych (2008). Козацька еліта Гетьманщини [The Cossack Elite of the Hetmanate] (PDF) (in Ukrainian). Kyiv: I. F. Kuras Institute of Political and Ethno-National Studies, National Academy of Sciences of Ukraine. p. 452. ISBN 978-966-02-4850. Archived from the original (PDF) on 27 September 2011.
