= Livonian–Russian war of 1480–1481 =

- Part of Livonian–Russian wars
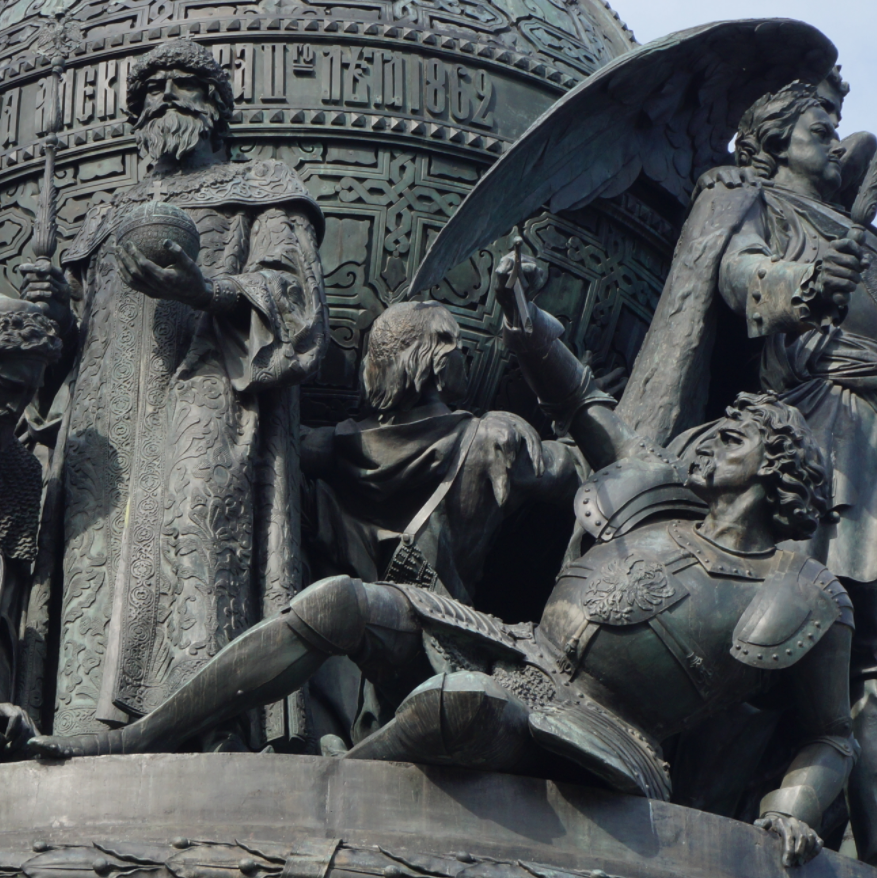
- Ivan III and killed Livonian knight
Date	1480–1481
Location	Pskov
Result	Russian victory

Belligerents
Livonian Order	Pskov Republic; Grand Duchy of Moscow

The Livonian–Russian war of 1480–1481 was a conflict between the Livonian Order and the joined forces of the Grand Duchy of Moscow and the Pskov Republic for dominion over territories today identified with the Estonia–Russia border. Conflict ended with the victory of Pskov and the "Germans made peace with Pskov on the will of Pskov" was concluded.

== Sources ==
- Пенской, Виталий (2020). Ливонская война: Забытые победы Ивана Грозного 1558–1561 гг. Moscow: Москва. ISBN 978-5-00155-260-4.
