= Battle of Verkiai =

1658 battle

- Part of Russo-Polish War (1654–1667)
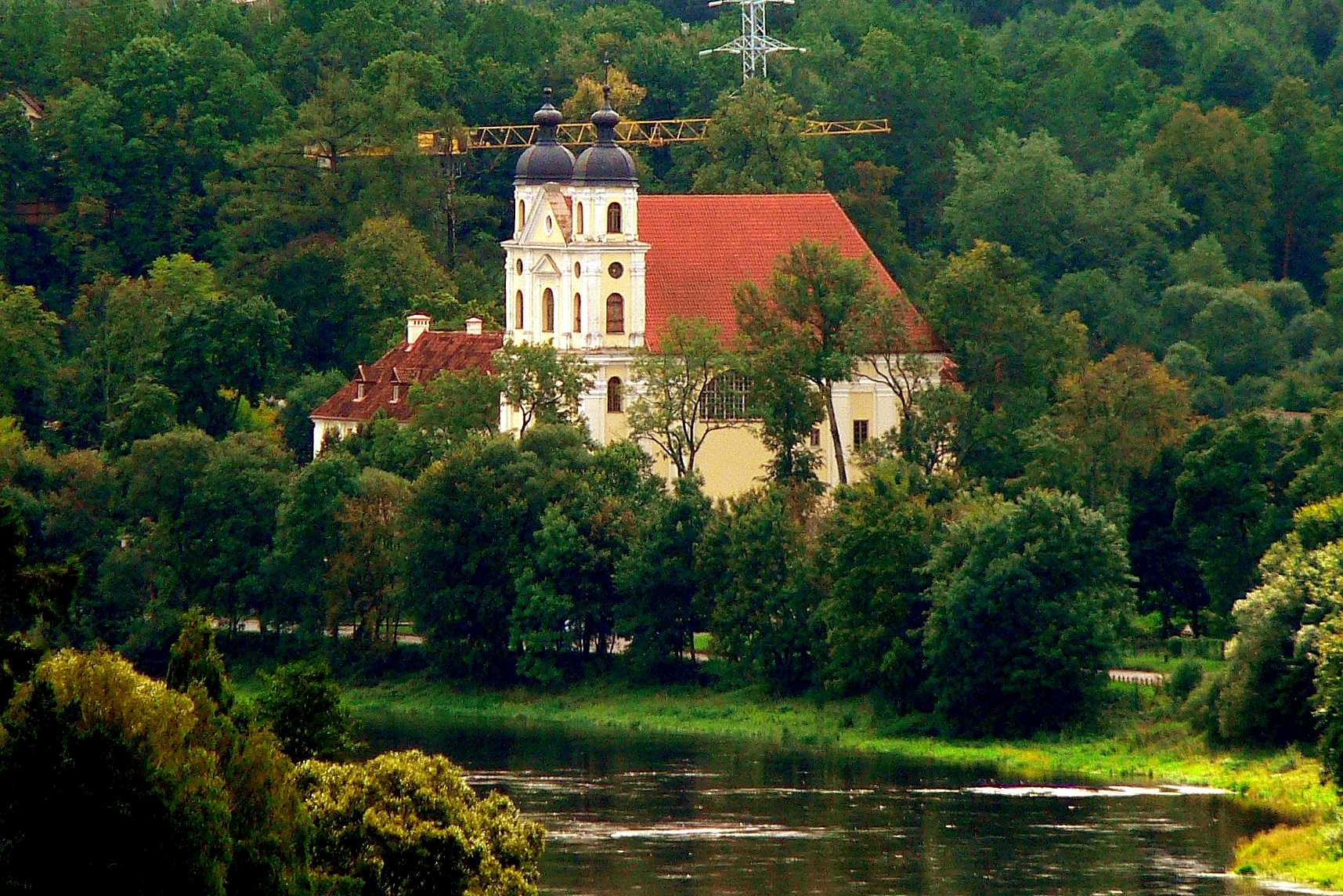
- Trinitary Monastery in Vilnius, Lithuania
Date	24 September – 11 October 1658
Location	Verkiai near Vilnius 54°44′54″N 25°17′30″E
Result	Russian victory

Belligerents
Polish–Lithuanian Commonwealth	(Tsardom of Russia) Russian Tsardom

Commanders and leaders
(Polish–Lithuanian Commonwealth) Wincenty Korwin Gosiewski (POW)	(Tsardom of Russia) Yury Dolgorukov

Strength
1,200–1,500 or 4,500	8,500

Casualties and losses
100–500 killed 77–100 captured	Unknown

Battle of Verkiai fought in autumn of 1658 between the Polish–Lithuanian Commonwealth and the Tsardom of Russia marked the resumption of hostilities in the Russo-Polish War (1654–67); it ended with Russian victory.

Russians, close to signing a peace treaty with Sweden (truce of Valiersari ending the Russo–Swedish War (1656–58)) decided to resume the war with Poland in order to gain control over the disputed Ruthenian territories. After the inconclusive negotiations with the Poles in Vilnius, army of prince Yury Dolgorukov attacked the Polish units guarding the Polish delegations near Verkiai. Polish troops were taken by surprise and were defeated, Russians took many prisoners, including the Polish leader, hetman Wincenty Korwin Gosiewski; Gosiewski would remain a hostage for four years. Another Polish commander, hetman Paweł Jan Sapieha, would be later blamed for not coming to the aid of Gosiewski due to personal friction between them.

== Bibliography ==
- Łukasz Ossoliński, "Kampania na Ukrainie 1660 roku"; doctoral thesis (University of Warsaw), 1995, available here
- Gawęda, Marcin (2005). Połonka-Basia 1660. Historyczne Bitwy. Warszawa: Dom Wydawniczy Bellona. ISBN 978-83-11-10211-8.
