= Siege of Mogilev (1655) =

Episode of the Russo-Polish War (1654–1667)

The siege of Mogilev of February–May 1655 was an unsuccessful siege of Mogilev (then in Grand Duchy of Lithuania, now in Belarus) under the control of the Russian side by Polish-Lithuanian forces during the Russo-Polish War (1654–1667).

== Background ==
As a result of economic and demographic development of Mogilev (Mohylew in Polish sources) during 16th-17th centuries it had become an important trade city of Grand Duchy of Lithuania. By mid-17th century the population of Mogilev was estimated as 30,000. In addition Mogilev with its area was a center of Eastern Orthodoxy in Grand Duchy of Lithuania.

In June 1654 the Russian army entered Polish-Lithuanian Commonwealth and Russian tsar Alexei Mikhailovich presented himself as a defender of Orthodox faith, which was met with sympathy of a significant part of the population of Mogilev, especially of commoners (czerń). At the tsar's court there was a certain Konstanty Wacław Pokłoński, a Polish noble from Mogilev of Orthodox faith, who took Russian side at the beginning of the war and was instrumental in bloodless surrender of Mogilev to Russia. Tsar gave Pokłoński a small regiment and later Pokłoński recruited volunteers from local places around Mogilev (henceforth known as Pokłoński's "cossacks"). Mogilev surrendered in late August, and in October a new voivode of Mogilev, Ivan Alferyev, was appointed by tsar. Alferyev died in December, soon after he started preparations of Mogilev for defense.

== Siege ==
Around Christmas time of 1654 a counter-offensive of the Polish-Lithuanian army headed by Janusz Radziwiłł and Wincenty Korwin Gosiewski, started. On February 2, 1655, part of their forces approached Mogilev and part of its dwellers greeted them, however the Polish-Lithuanian forces were fended off. Pokłoński allegedly promised Radziwiłł to switch sides, and indeed, on February 15 Pokłoński with 400 men of szlachta and his "cossacks" did this, and with his help the Polish-Lithuanian forces managed to take over the suburbs, the area inside the so-called Circular Rampart (Круговой вал, Circular Wall), the "New Town" ( Новый город) fortification, however the city proper stood, despite the fact that a considerable number of dwellers were unhappy with Russian rule, sympathized Radziwiłł, and moved away with Polish-Lithuanian forces when they were fended off the inner Lesser Rampart. After that the siege started, described as "hapless". Several attacks (February 22, March 18, April 19, April 23, and May 11) were fended off, and in early May 1655 Radziwiłł lifted the siege and departed after ransacking the suburbs.

== Aftermath ==
Tsar visited the city, awarded it for its loyalty, and the merchants of the city were granted the right to purchase the loot from Russian soldiers.

As of 2003 little primary sources exist about the period 1655–1660, i.e., until the next siege of Mogulev in this war.
