= Battle of Kaniv (1662) =

Battle

- Part of Russo-Polish War (1654–1667) and The Ruin
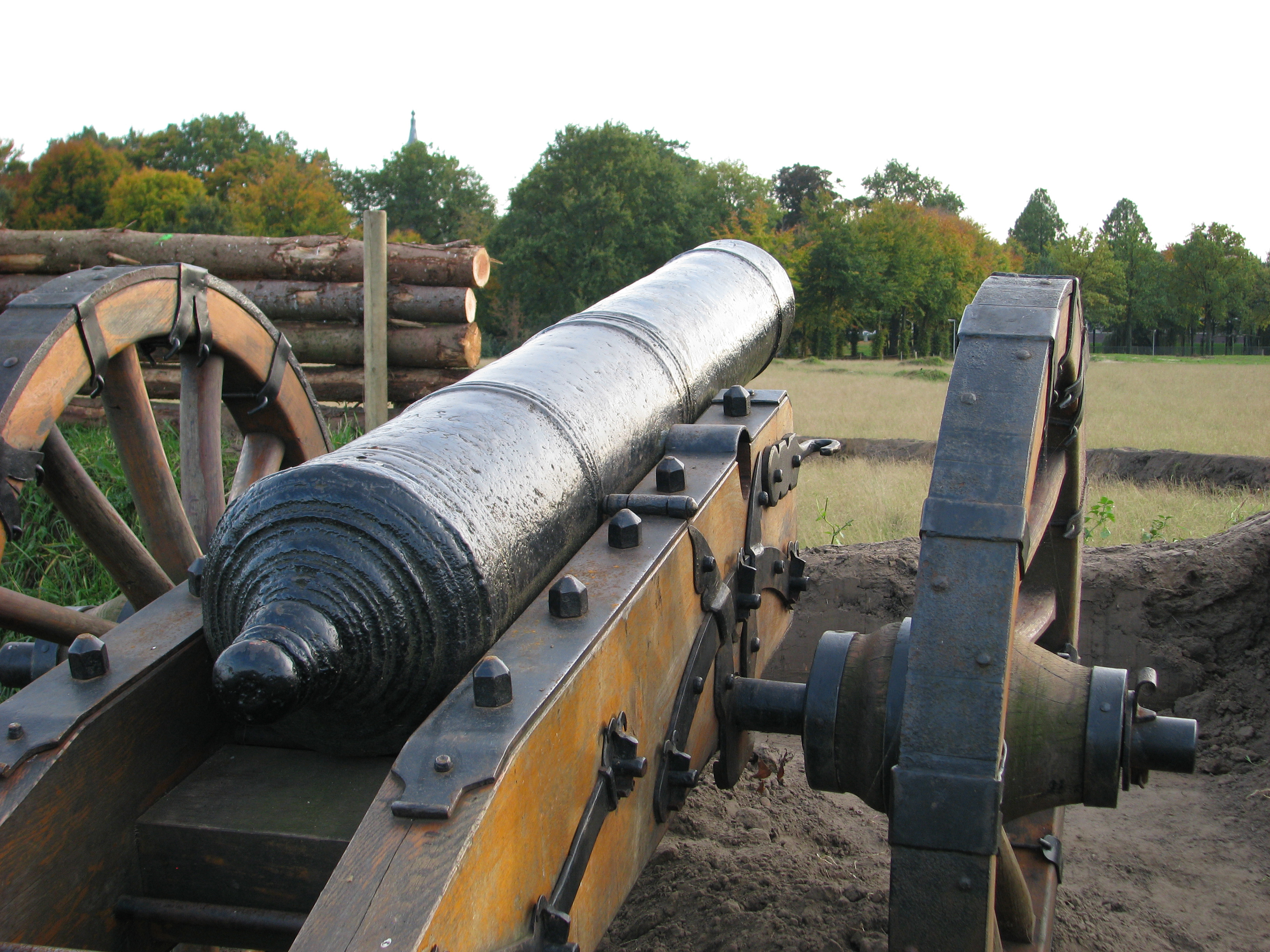
Date	July 26, 1662
Location	Kaniv, Polish-Lithuanian Commonwealth (Modern day Ukraine)
Result	Russian victory
Territorial changes	Left-Bank Ukraine annexed by Tsardom of Russia

Belligerents
Polish-Lithuanian Commonwealth; Cossack Hetmanate; Crimean Khanate	Russia; Cossack Hetmanate

Commanders and leaders
Yuri Khmelnitsky	Grigory Romodanovsky; Yakym Somko

Strength
20,000	10,000 to 28,000

Casualties and losses
6,000 Cossacks; 2,000 Polish soldiers Total: 8,000 dead and 74 captured 117 banners	200–300 soldiers

Battle of Kaniv (Russian: Каневское сражение, romanized: Kanevskoe srazhenie), was a battle during the summer campaign in the left-bank of Ukraine of Yuri Khmelnitsky, between the Cossack-Polish troops and the Russian-Cossack army led by Yakym Somko and Grigory Romodanovsky. The battle ended with a crushing defeat for Yuri Khmelnitsky and the hetman's retreat to right-bank Ukraine. It was this defeat that began to raise doubts about Yuri in the Cossacks and as a result, in January 1663, he was overthrown.

== Background ==
After defeat of the Russians at Chudnov and the betrayal of the Russian Tsardom by Yuri Khmelnitsky, Left-bank Ukraine with Yakim Soma was for Russia, right-bank Ukraine led by Yuri Khmelnitsky was a supporter of the Polish-Lithuanian Commonwealth. During the summer campaign of 1662 of Yuri Khmelnitsky, the Ukrainian hetman was defeated in the Sieges of Pereiaslav and subsequently retreated to Kanev, where a battle took place between the tsar's troops and the hetman's army

== The forces of the parties ==
The size of the Allied army is fairly well known, taking into account the losses they suffered at Pereyaslavl: 14,000 Cossacks, 4,000 Poles and 2,000 Crimean Tatars, In addition, they had 24 guns, this large group took up strong defensive positions along the Dnieper.

The exact strength of the Cossack loyalists and Russians cannot be established due to the lack of documents regarding the Cossack group. Yurii Khmelnitsky estimates the strength of the Russians in a letter to Jan Kazimierz at 55,000 people, but this position has been criticized, the total number of Russians directly: 14,500 people. To this should be added the regiment of Reitar, numbering 3,000 and Cossacks, numbering about 10,500. The total number of troops is estimated from 10,000 to 28,000.

== Battle ==
After retreating from Pereyaslavl, Yuri Khmelnitsky dug in against enemy and began to wait for the attack. Romodanovsky joined Somko's Cossacks and together they set off along the Cossack hetman's retreat route. A surprise attack on the Cossack ranks failed, Khmelnitsky's cavalry retreated to the convoy without a fight. After this, 2,000 Tatar cavalry deserted and «went back to their lands». Yurii moved his cavalry against the Russians, and Somko did the same, he personally moved in the vanguard of the Russian-Cossack army. Then the Russian cavalry attacked. It was the attack of the Russian reiters and spearmen that became decisive; the hetman's army scattered and began to flee, while Yuri himself escaped through a nearby forest.

== Aftermath ==
As a result of the battle, The Allied army suffered a crushing defeat, the Russians took and angered Cherkassy. The battle revealed the obvious weakness of the Cossack army and opened the way for the Russians to the right-bank Ukraine. Ukrainians lost 6,000 killed, captured and drowned, which bypassed even the Battle of Konotop. The Russians took 117 banners and 22 cannons, which is equivalent to the trophies of the Poles at Chudnov.

== Memory ==
Soon after the end of the Russo-Polish War, the Battle of Kanev was forgotten. This was due to the fact that the opponents of the Russian army were the Cossacks of Right-Bank Ukraine, who fought on the side of the Polish king, and the informal taboo on studying the history of conflicts between Russians and Ukrainians that existed during the imperial and Soviet periods.

Solovyov briefly notes this battles in his work "History of Russia from Ancient Times" in Volume 11 Chapter 2:

...And on July 16 attacked Khmelnitsky's camps, who suffered a complete defeat. Kanev and Cherkassy were occupied by the tsar's troops.
