= Anatol Hrytskievich =

Belarusian historian

Anatol Hrytskievich (Belarusian: Анатоль Грыцкевіч; January 31, 1929 – January 20, 2015) was a Belarusian historian. He was a correspondent member of the International Academy of Science of Eurasia (1996–2015), doctor of history (1986–2015), professor (1987–2015). He was born in Minsk.

== Career ==
Anatol Hrytskievich graduated in 1950 from the Minsk Medical Institute and in 1955 — from the Minsk Pedagogical Institute of Foreign Languages and in 1958 from the Belarusian State University history faculty.

Since 1959, Anatol Hrytskievich worked at the History Institute of the Academy of Sciences of Belarus, since 1975 as a dean at the Minsk Culture Institute, since 1996 as director of the Belarusian Institute of Central and Eastern Europe.

Hrytskievich was a researcher of medieval History of Belarus, the history of Belarusian szlachta, Eastern Orthodoxy and Eastern Catholicism in Belarus.

Anatol Hrytskievich died on January 20, 2015.

== Selected works ==
- Аршанская бітва 1514 года і яе ўдзельнікі (The Battle of Orsha of 1514 and its participants)
- Слуцкае паўстанне. На крутым павароце гісторыі (The Slutsk Uprising: on a sharp volt of history)

== Selected articles and interviews ==
- Гісторыя геапалітыкі Беларусі (The history of Geopolitics of Belarus)
- Каранацыя Міндоўга як дзяржаўны акт (The crowning of Mindaugas as an act of statehood)
- Анатоль Грыцкевіч: 1000 год таму Літва знаходзілася на тэрыторыі Беларусі (Anatol Hrytskievich: 1000 years ago the historical Lithuania was on the lands of modern Belarus)
- Заняпад беларускай мовы ў беларуска-літоўскім гаспадарстве ў XVIII стагоддзі (The decline of Belarusian language in the Belarusian-Lithuanian state in the 18th century)
