= Polish–Russian War (1654–1667) =

Conflict in Eastern Europe

- Part of a series of Polish–Russian wars
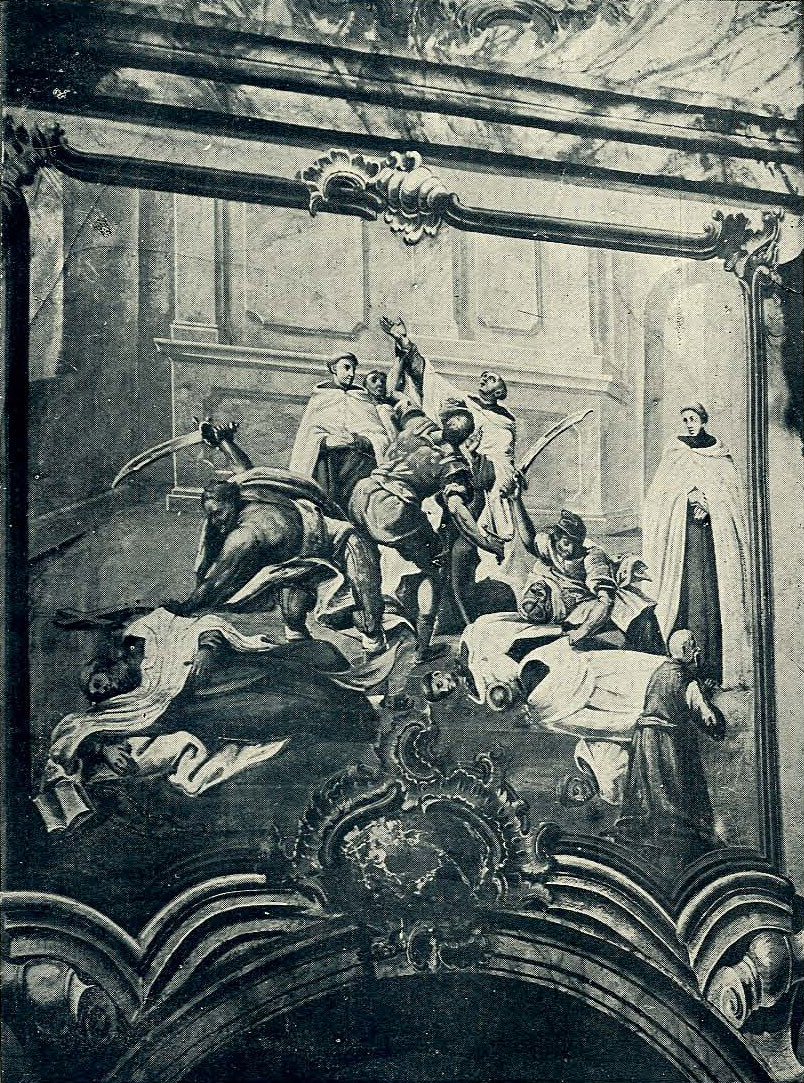
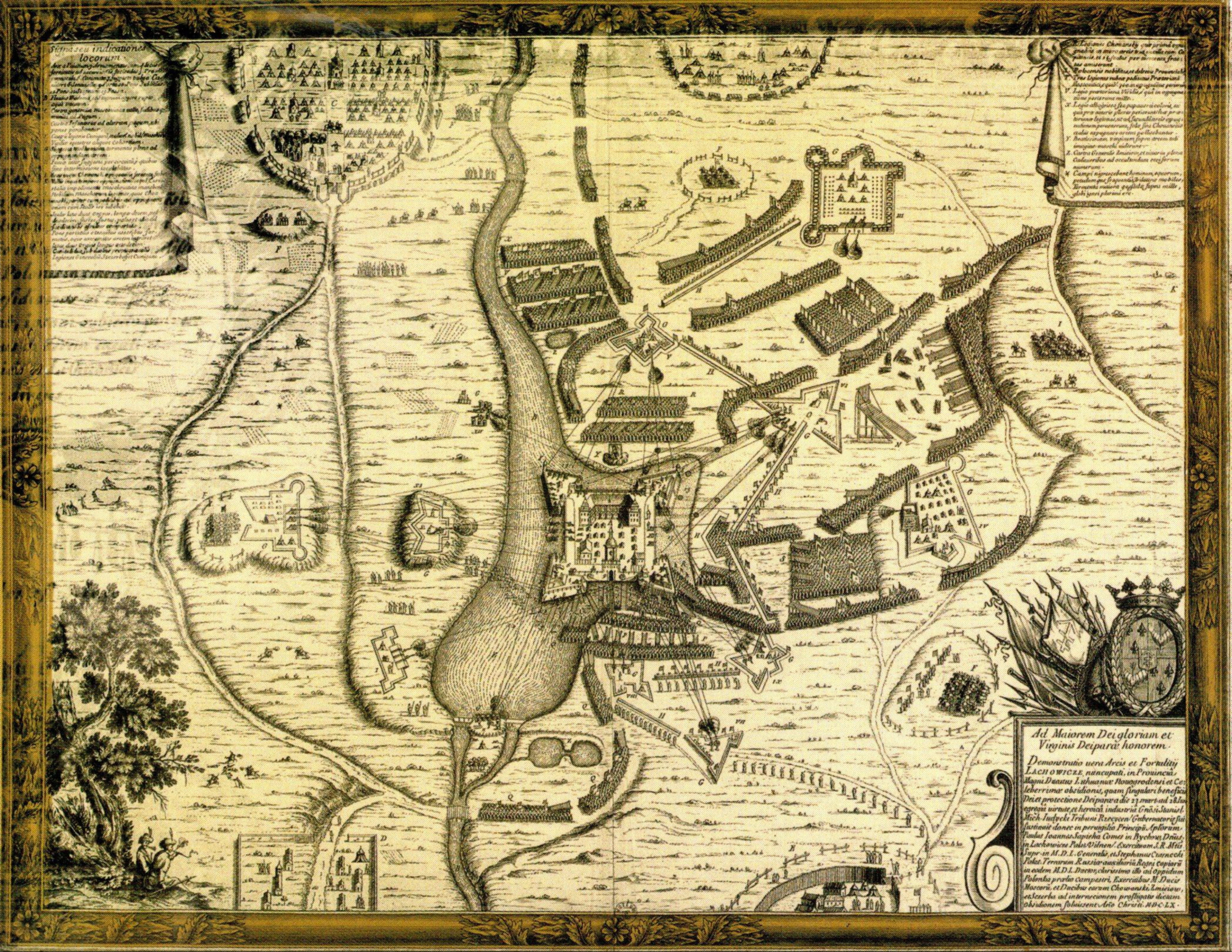
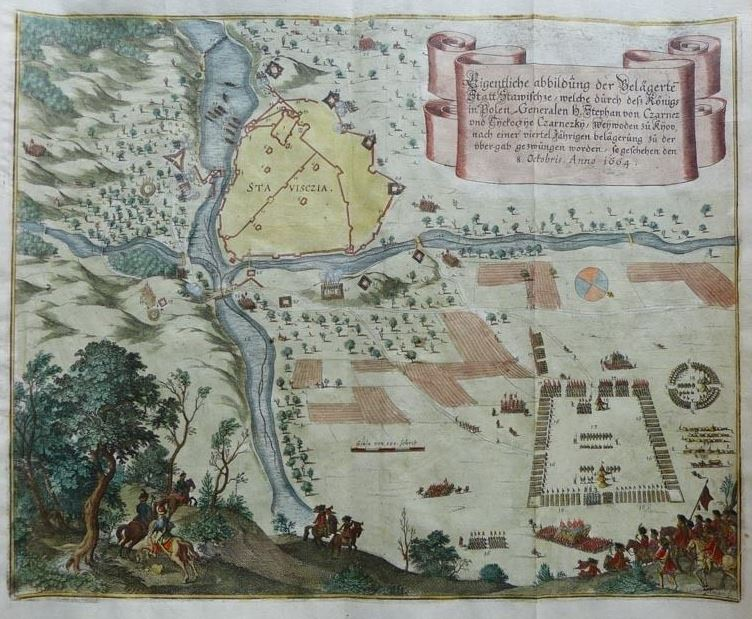
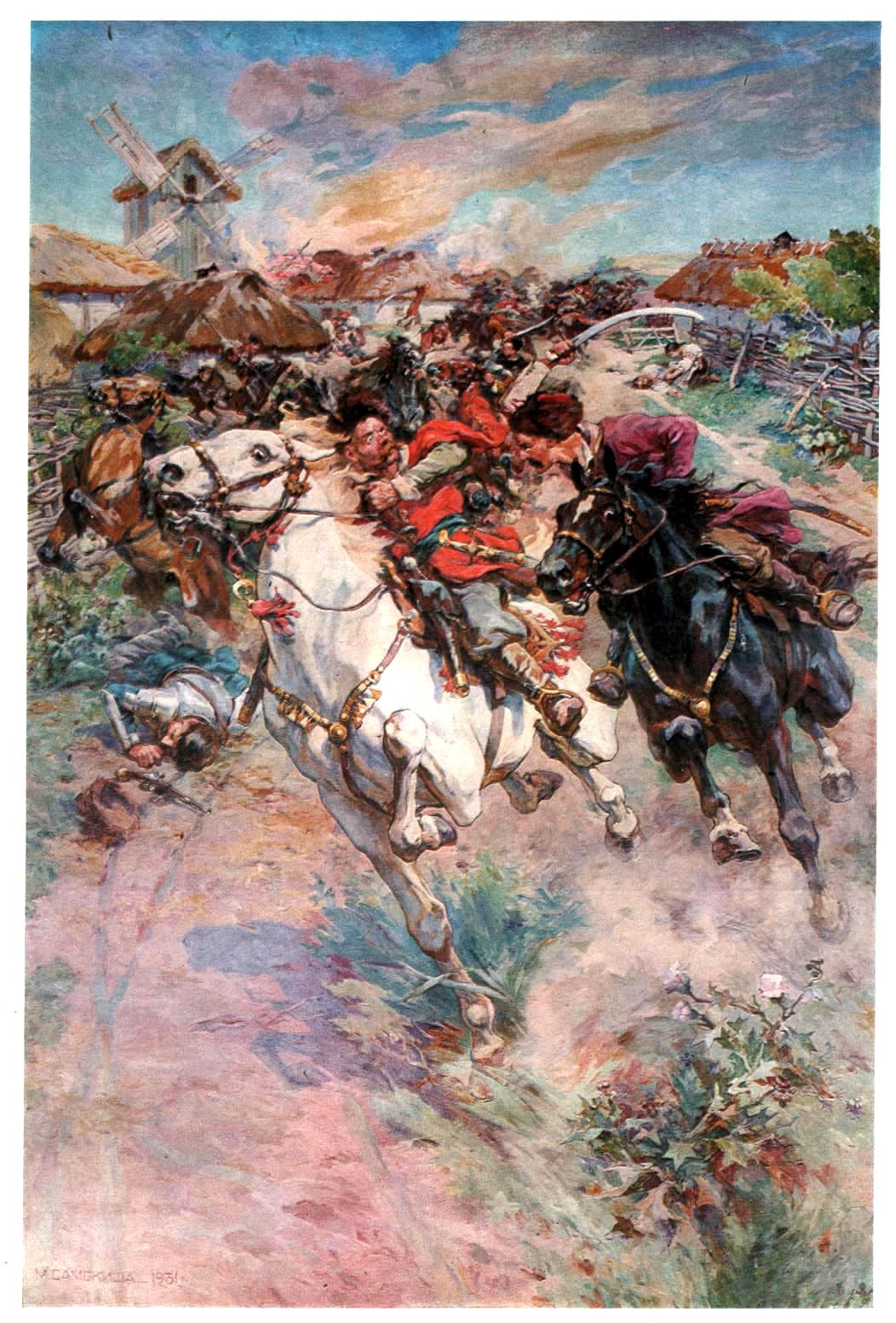
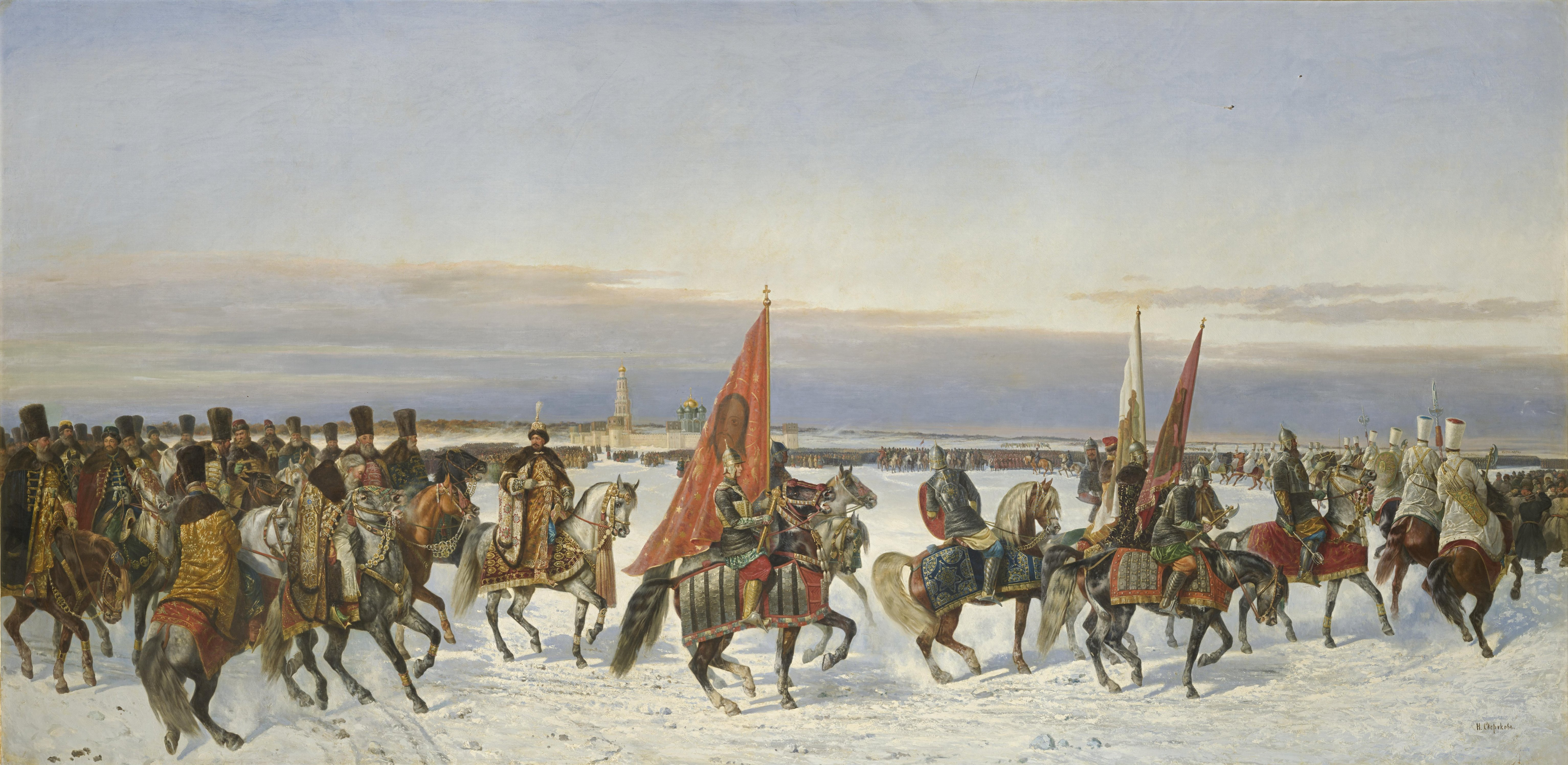
- Clockwise from top left: Trubetsky's massacre; The siege of Lyakhavichy by Russian troops (1660); Battle between the Cossack polkovnik Ivan Bohun (right) and the Polish nobleman Stefan Czarniecki (left); Departure of Tsar Alexei to inspect the troops (1664); The siege of Stavishche by Polish troops (1664)
| Date | 1654–1667 |
| Location | Europe: Eastern Borderlands of the Polish–Lithuanian Commonwealth |
| Result | Russian victory (Truce of Andrusovo) |
| Territorial changes | Russia gains control of left-bank Ukraine, Kiev and Smolensk. |

Belligerents
| Tsardom of Russia; Cossack Hetmanate | Polish-Lithuanian Commonwealth; Crimean Khanate; Cossack Hetmanate (1658–1659, 1660–1667 in Right-bank Ukraine) (Margraviate of Brandenburg) Duchy of Prussia (1654–1656) |

Commanders and leaders
| (Tsardom of Russia) Alexei I (Tsardom of Russia) Aleksey Trubetskoy; Bohdan Khmelnytsky # Yurii Khmelnytsky; Ivan Bohun (executed); Ivan Sirko; Mykhailo Khanenko; Ivan Zolotarenko † (Tsardom of Russia) Vasily Sheremetev (surrendered) (Tsardom of Russia) Vasiliy Buturlin (Tsardom of Russia) Ivan Khovansky (Tsardom of Russia) Yuri Dolgorukov (Tsardom of Russia) Afanasy Ordin-Nashchokin (Tsardom of Russia) Yakov Cherkassky # † (Note: Polish sources testify that he died near Mogilev in 1665, killed by meal during lunch. Russian sources say that he died in Moscow.) | (Polish–Lithuanian Commonwealth) Stefan Czarniecki (DOW) (Polish–Lithuanian Commonwealth) Wincenty Gosiewski (POW) (executed) (Polish–Lithuanian Commonwealth) John II Casimir (Polish–Lithuanian Commonwealth) Stanisław Lanckoroński (Polish–Lithuanian Commonwealth) Jerzy Sebastian Lubomirski (Polish–Lithuanian Commonwealth) Michał Kazimierz Pac (Polish–Lithuanian Commonwealth) Aleksander Hilary Połubiński (Polish–Lithuanian Commonwealth) Stanisław Rewera Potocki (Polish–Lithuanian Commonwealth) Janusz Radziwiłł # (Polish–Lithuanian Commonwealth) Paweł Jan Sapieha; Ivan Vyhovsky (executed); Pavlo Teteria; Petro Doroshenko |

The Polish–Russian War of 1654–1667 (Note: Also called the Thirteen Years' War, Muscovite War of 1654–1667 and the First Northern War.) was a major conflict between the Tsardom of Russia and the Polish–Lithuanian Commonwealth. Between 1655 and 1660, the Swedish invasion was also fought in the Polish–Lithuanian Commonwealth and so the period became known as "The Deluge".

The Commonwealth initially suffered defeats, but it regained its ground and won several decisive battles. However, its plundered economy was not able to fund the long conflict. Facing internal crisis and civil war, the Commonwealth was forced to sign a truce. The war ended with significant Russian territorial gains and marked the beginning of the rise of Russia as a great power in Eastern Europe.

== Background ==
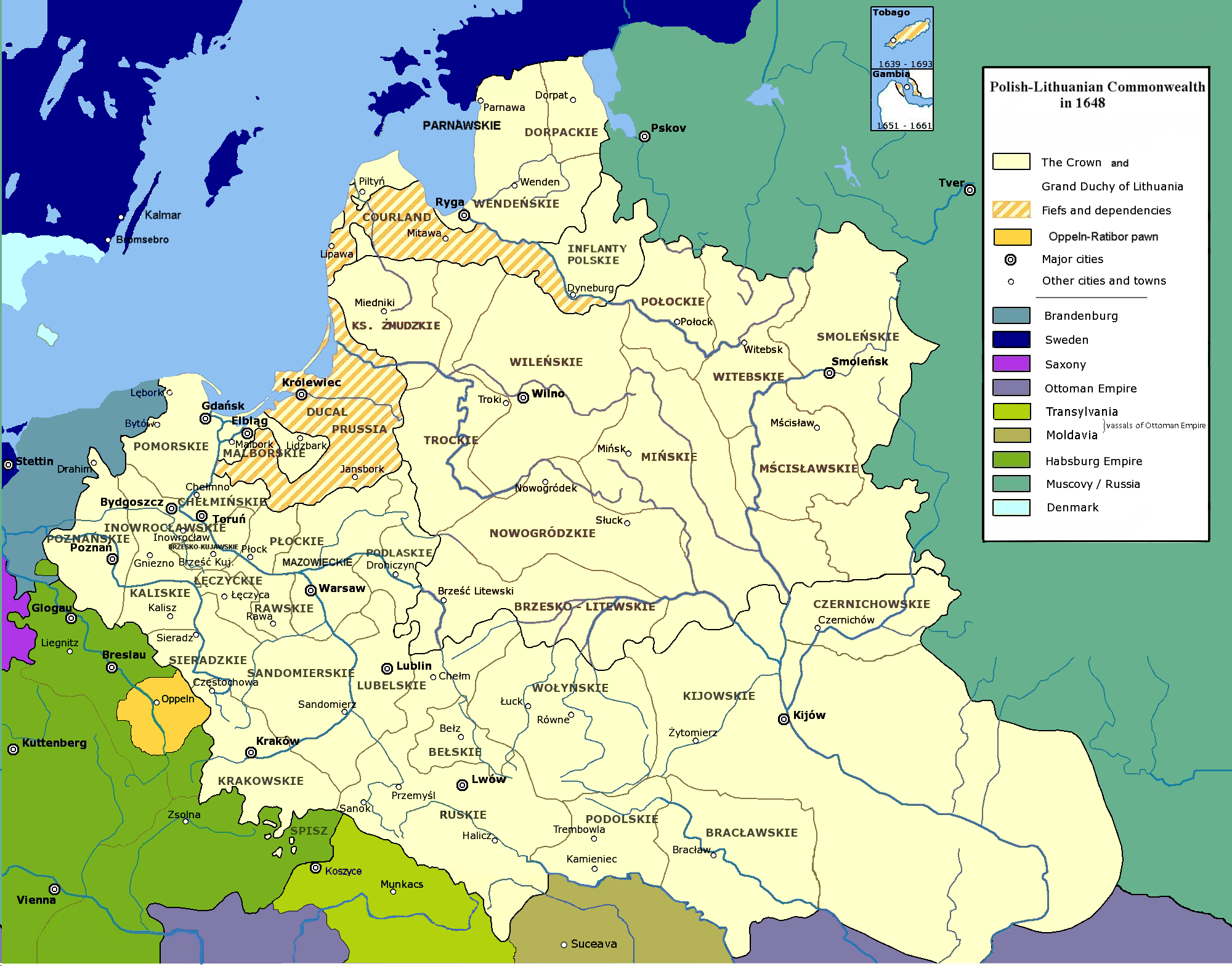
Polish–Lithuanian Commonwealth in 1648

In the late recent decade prior to the conflict, tensions brewed significantly between Poles and Cossacks, ranging from discontent amongst the populace towards religious strife emboldened by the Cossacks' bitterness against the Polish hierarchy; These finally broke in 1648 when the Khmelnytsky insurrection of Zaporozhian Cossacks against the Commonwealth was initiated by Bohdan Khmelnytsky, obtaining his primary endorsement from Tsar Alexis in exchange for his allegiance within the Tsardom. During his preliminary arrangements when he was securing to receive Tatar support, a Polish army dispatched by Władysław IV Vasa advancing in the direction of Ukraine was destroyed within two separate battles in May. Khmelnytsky benefitted upon the victories, whom forwarded them as a signal for a popular revolt.

Violence dominated Ukraine against those who were deemed to be Polish collaborators, such as authoritative officials as well as landlords, as well as the Latin and Uniate clergies. Pogroms against Jews were widespread, given their recognition as (arendators), which from the peasants' behalf identified them as oppressive. Heavy crackdowns and reprisals subjected over the revolting population only further intensified the Cossack uprising, with yet another defeat dealt against a recent Polish military formation. Khmelnytsky them subsequently advanced west on Galicia before besieging Zamość. However, he did not extend his rapid campaign despite his major advantage over the Poles. Following the death of Władysław in May, his half-brother became King after he was elected by Parliament in November, incentivising Khmelnytsky to immediately withdraw, and returned to Ukraine shortly thereafter. Entering Kiev the very next January, he was widely acclaimed as a liberator over the region. John II Casimir Vasa immediately begun setting reforms in order to resolve political disputes, ethnic tensions and a whirlwind of conflict unleashed over the provinces.

Despite having initially requested an addressing of issues from the Polish authorities, Khmelnytsky started to shift his overall focus after civilian opinion firmly shifted in his favour. He then began conceiving Ukraine as a sovereign Cossack state. Soon afterwards, he initiated plans for a system of government and monetary authorities, founding a local administration under a governing establishment consisting of veteran Cossack officers, and also introduced relations with foreign states. Remaining prepared to formally recognise sovereignty under the Polish crown, he set about negotiations with the Poles. This resulted in the inconclusive Treaty of Zboriv in the summer of that year – likewise with another two years afterward – with neither being acceptable to the Poles nor Ukrainians, nor radicalised general populace, the vast consensus of whom then aligned themselves with the Khmelnytsky faction. Although intermittent clashes and engagements resumed between the Poles and revolting partisans, their Tatar allies demonstrated unreliability during pivotal events, thus Khmelnytsky began searching for other allies that would assist them in their resolve for nationhood.

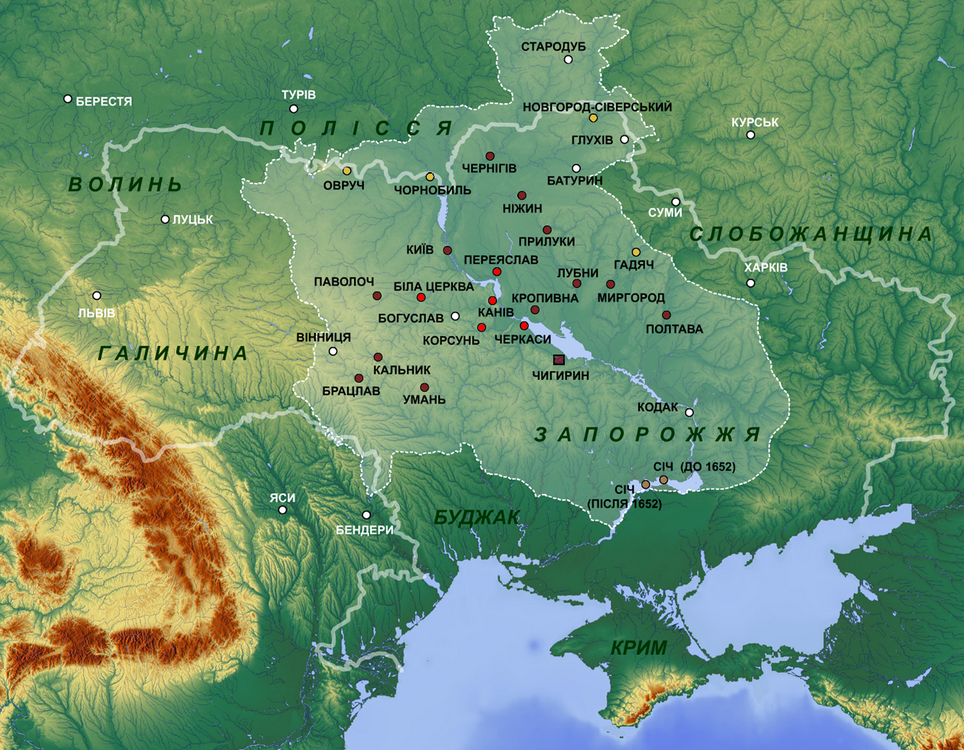
The Zaporizhian Cossack host in 1654 (against the backdrop of contemporary Ukraine)

In 1654, the Pereiaslav Agreement was signed between Khmelnytsky and the hierarchy of Moscow, producing some greatly disputed results; Russian historians have often highlighted Ukraine's acceptance of the Tsar's superiority, thereby legitimising Russian dominant rule, although Ukrainian historiography stressed Moscow's recognition of their autonomous rights – associating an elected hetmancy, state government along with access to foreign relations – which was essentially equivalent to independence, as mentioned within the agreement. Although the Zemsky Sobor of 1651 was poised to accept the Cossacks into the Moscow sphere of influence and to enter the war against Poland–Lithuania; The Tsar waited until 1653, when a new popular assembly eventually authorised the protectorate of Ukraine with Tsardom of Russia. After the Cossacks ratified the agreement at the Pereiaslav Council, the Russo-Polish War became inevitable.

== Invasion of the Commonwealth ==
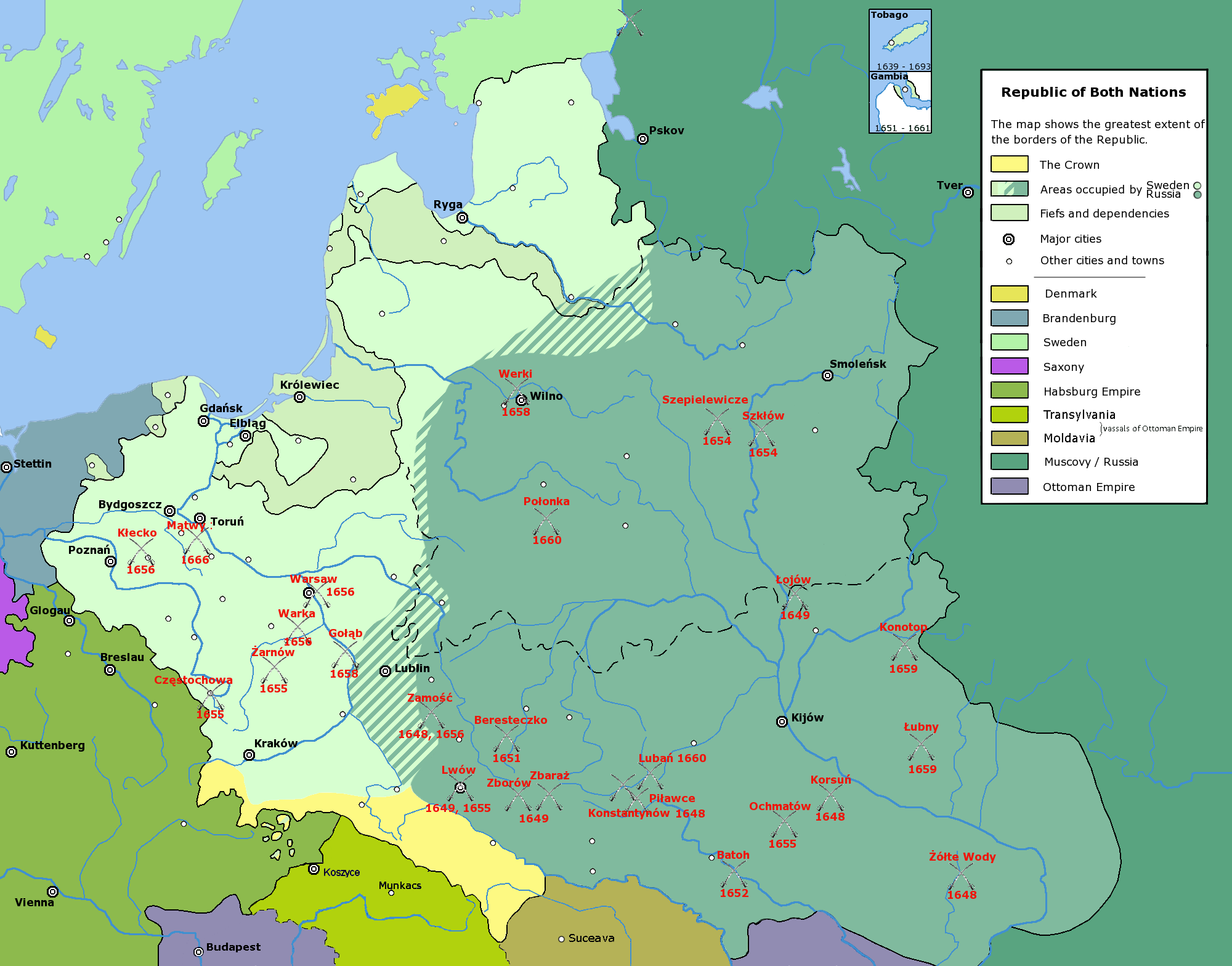
Occupation of the Commonwealth by Russia, Sweden, Brandenburg and the Cossacks during The Deluge and Khmelnytsky Uprising

In July 1654 the Russian army of 41,000 (nominally under the Tsar, but in fact commanded by Princes Yakov Cherkassky, Nikita Odoevsky and Ivan Khovansky) captured the border forts of Bely and Dorogobuzh and laid siege to Smolensk.

The Russian position at Smolensk was endangered as long as Great Lithuanian Hetman, Prince Janusz Radziwiłł, with a 10,000 man garrison, held Orsha, slightly to the west. Cherkassky took Orsha; forces under his command, led by Kniaz (Prince, or Duke) Yuri Baryatinsky, forced Radziwiłł to retreat in the Battle of Shklov (which took place during a solar eclipse, and for which both sides claimed victory), fought on 12 August. Radziwiłł was again defeated twelve days later at the Battle of Shepeleviche. After a three-month siege, Smolensk – the main object of the previous Russo-Polish War – fell to the Russians on 23 September.

In the meantime, Prince Aleksey Trubetskoy led the southern flank of the Russian army from Bryansk to Ukraine. The territory between the Dnieper and Berezina was overrun quickly, with Trubetskoy taking Mstislavl and Roslavl and his Ukrainian allies capturing Homel. On the northern flank, V.B. Sheremetev set out from Pskov and seized the Lithuanian cities of Nevel (1 July), Polotsk (17 July), and Vitebsk (17 November).

Thereupon the Tsar's troops in December swarmed over Polish Livonia and firmly established themselves in Ludza and Rezekne. Simultaneously, the combined forces of Khmelnitsky and the Russian Boyar Buturlin struck against Volynia. Despite many disagreements between the commanders, they took hold of Ostroh and Rivne by the end of the year.

In the winter and spring of 1655, Radziwiłł launched a counter-offensive in Belarus, recapturing Orsha and besieging Mogilev. This siege continued for three months with no conclusion. In January, Sheremetev and Khmelnitsky were defeated at the Battle of Okhmativ, while a second Polish army (allied with the Tatars) crushed a Russian-Ukrainian contingent at Zhashkiv.

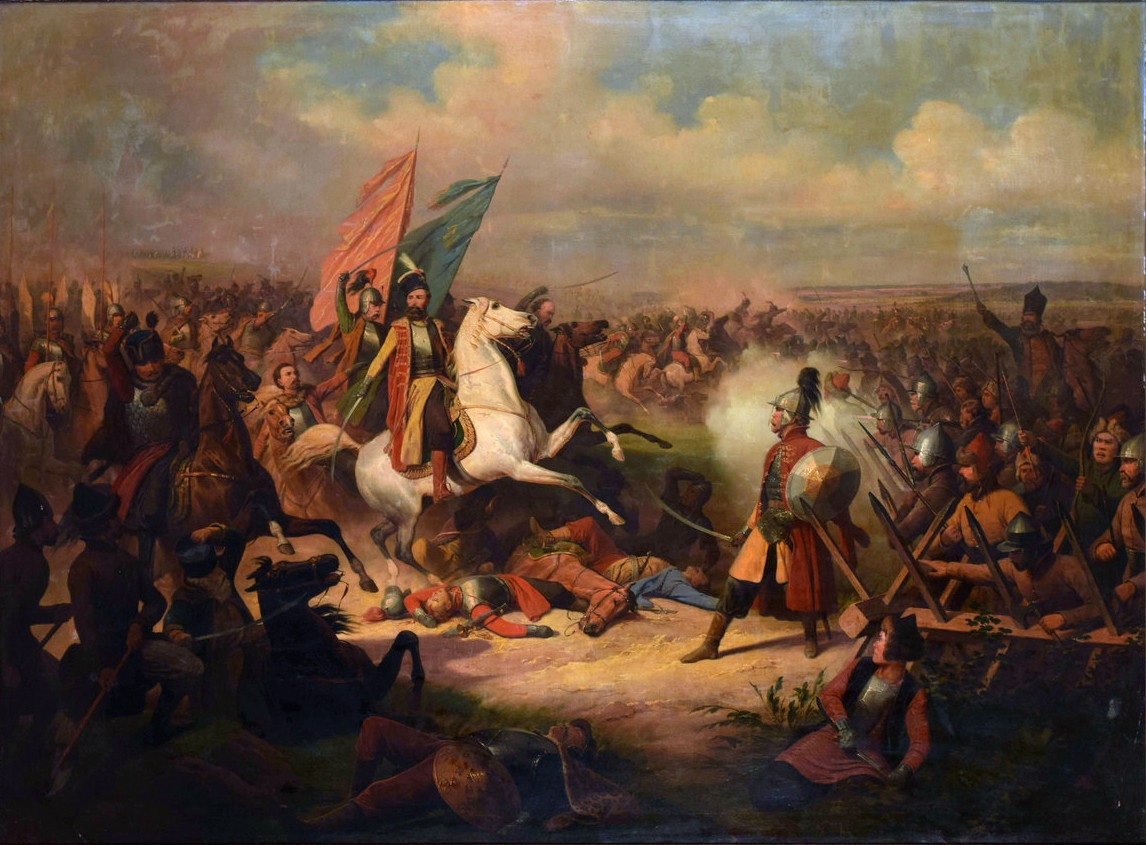
Stefan Czarniecki during the Russo-Polish War

Alarmed by these reverses, the Tsar hastened from Moscow and at his instigation a massive offensive was launched. The Lithuanian forces offered little effective resistance and surrendered Minsk to the Cossacks and Cherkassky on 3 July. Vilnius, the capital of the Great Duchy of Lithuania, was taken by the Russians on 31 July. This success was followed up by the conquest of Kaunas and Hrodno in August.

Elsewhere, Prince Volkonsky sailed from Kiev up the Dnieper and the Pripyat, routing the Lithuanians and capturing Pinsk on his way. Trubetskoy's unit overran Slonim and Kletsk, while Sheremetev managed little beyond seizing Velizh on 17 June. A Lithuanian garrison still resisted the Cossacks' siege in Stary Bykhov, when Khmelnitsky and Buturlin were already active in Galicia. They attacked the Polish city of Lwów in September and entered Lublin after Pawel Jan Sapieha's defeat near Brest.

== Armistice and campaign against Vyhovsky ==
The Russians advance into the Polish–Lithuanian Commonwealth led to the kingdom of Sweden invading Poland in 1655 under King Charles X.

Afanasy Ordin-Nashchokin then opened negotiations with the Poles and signed an armistice, Truce of Vilna, on 2 November. After that, Russian forces marched on Swedish Livonia and besieged Riga in the Russo-Swedish War (1656–1658), a theater of the Second Northern War. Khmelnytsky was not against this temporary truce and supported the Tsar though he warned him of Polish furtiveness. Ivan Vyhovsky, the newly elected hetman in 1657 upon the death of Khmelnytsky, allied himself with the Poles in September 1658, creating the Grand Duchy of Ruthenia. However, the Cossacks were also beset with the start of a civil war with this Commonwealth treaty and a new Treaty of Pereyaslav with Russia in 1659.

The Tsar concluded with Sweden the advantageous Treaty of Valiersar, which allowed him to resume hostilities against the Poles in October, capturing Wincenty Gosiewski at the Battle of Werki. In the north, Sapieha's attempt to blockade Vilnius was checked by Prince Yury Dolgorukov on 11 October. Russians under the command of Romodanovsky invaded Ukraine in the south, the Cossacks who had previously besieged Kiev were defeated and Vyhovsky again swore the oath to the Russian tsar. In Belarus, the Ukrainian Cossacks staged a mutiny, but as a result of the decisive siege at Varva were defeated. However, in 1659, with the support of the Tatars, he was able to inflict a heavy defeat on the Russians.

Polish-Russian War 1654–1667

The threat to the Russians during their conquests in Ukraine was relieved after Vyhovsky lost his alliance with Crimean Khanate due to a campaign against Crimea by Kosh Otaman Ivan Sirko, who later attacked Chyhyryn as well.

An uprising started in the Siever Ukraine where Vyhovsky stationed a number of Polish garrisons, during which Ukrainian nobleman Yuri Nemyrych, who was considered the original author of the Hadyach Treaty, was killed. Together with the Uman colonel Mykhailo Khanenko Sirko led a full scale uprising throughout Ukraine. The mutinied Cossacks demanded that Vyhovsky to surrender the hetman's attributes and return power to Khmelnitsky's son Yurii as the legitimate hetman of Ukraine. Both forces faced off near the village of Hermanivka. There the rest of Cossacks deserted Vyhovsky and rallied under Yuri Khmelnytsky, while Vyhovsky was left with the Polish troops and other mercenaries. A council was gathered with participation of both sides where the union with Poland–Lithuania was proclaimed invalid. Due to the rising arguments and threats Vyhovsky left the meeting. The council elected Khmelnytsky as the new hetman and an official request to surrender power was sent to Vyhovsky who had no other choice as to comply.

Russian forces, stunned at Konotop tried to renegotiate a peace treaty on any terms. However, the change of powers within the Cossack Hetmanate reflected the influence of the Russian foreign policy in Ukraine and reassured voivode Trubetskoi. Trubetskoi invited Khmelnytsky to renegotiate.

Advised by starshyna not to rush it Yuri Khmelnytsky, sent out Petro Doroshenko as his envoy. Trubetskoi, however, insisted on the presence of the hetman to sign the official treaty at Pereyaslav. Arriving there Khmelnytsky discovered that he was ambushed and had to comply to the terms imposed on the Cossacks by Muscovites (see Pereyaslav Articles).

== End of the war ==
Most of the eastern areas marked in orange were lost by the Commonwealth to Russia in 1667; the rest were lost in the Grzymułtowski's Peace Treaty of 1686.

The tide turned in favor of the Polish–Lithuanian Commonwealth in 1660. King John II Casimir, having concluded the Second Northern War against Sweden with the Treaty of Oliva, was now able to concentrate all his forces on the Eastern front. Sapieha and Stefan Czarniecki defeated Khovansky at the Battle of Polonka on 27 June. Then, Potocki and Lubomirski attacked V.B. Sheremetev in the Battle of Cudnów and forced him to capitulate on 2 November, after persuading Yurii Khmelnytsky to withdraw on 17 October. These reverses forced the Tsar to accept the Treaty of Kardis, by way of averting a new war against Sweden.

In July 1662, the Right-Bank forces of Yuri Khmelnytsky, supported by Polish and Crimean Tatar troops (about 20 000 men ), were defeated in the large battle of Kaniv by the Russian forces of Grigory Romodanovsky and the Left-Bank Cossacks of Yakym Somko (about 28 000 men).

Towards the end of 1663, the Polish-Lithuanian King crossed the Dnieper and invaded Left-bank Ukraine. Most towns in his path surrendered without resistance, but his siege of Hlukhiv in January was a costly failure, and he suffered a further setback at Novgorod-Seversky, and so his Ukrainian campaign proved a fiasco. The forces of Lithuania in the summer managed to defeat the invading corps of Khovansky near Vitebsk, but overall the 1664 campaigns were a disappointment.

Peace negotiations dragged on from 1664 until January 1667, when civil war forced the Poles and Lithuanians to conclude the Treaty of Andrusovo, whereby the Polish–Lithuanian Commonwealth ceded to Russia the fortress of Smolensk and Ukraine on the left bank of the Dnieper River (including Kiev), while the Commonwealth retained the right-bank Ukraine.

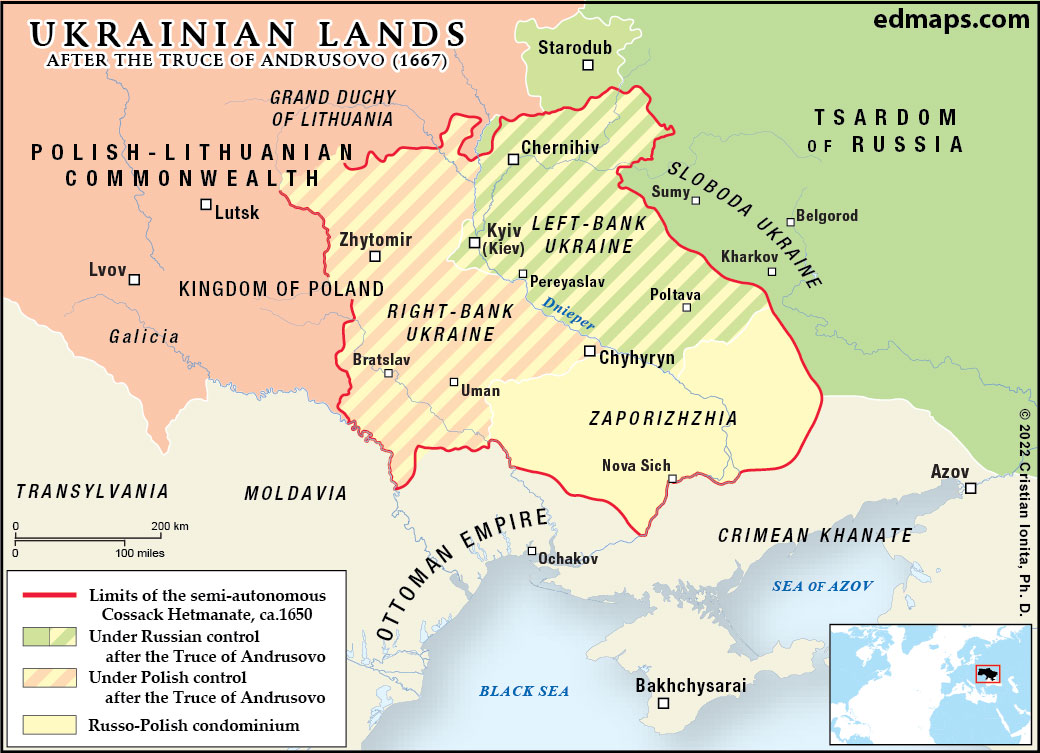
Partition of Cossack Hetmanate after the Truce of Andrusovo in 1667

In addition to the territorial changes from the war, this conflict sparked major changes in the Russian military. While the Russian army was still a "semi-standing, mobilized seasonally", this conflict moved it along the path toward a standing army, laying the groundwork for Russian military successes under Peter the Great and Catherine the Great.

This war, occurring during a time known as the Deluge, was a major negative outcome for the Polish nation. While Poland had been able to regain some of its lost territories, in the long-term it greatly weakened and left Poland increasingly vulnerable to Russian incursions. The country found itself unable to prevent the future Partitions of Poland, in which Russia took a major part.

== See also ==
- List of battles of the Polish–Russian War (1654–1667)

== Sources ==
- Gumilev, Lev (2023) [1996]. От Руси к России [For Rus' to Russia]. Эксклюзивная классика (in Russian) (revised ed.). Moscow: AST. ISBN 978-5-17-153845-3.
- Perrie, Maurren (2006). The Cambridge history of Russia. Volume 1: From early Rus' to 1689. Cambridge University Press. ISBN 0-521-81227-5.
- Bushkovitch, Paul (2012). A Concise History of Russia. Cambridge University Press. ISBN 978-1-139-50444-7.
- Essen, Michael Fredholm von (2023). Charles X's Wars. Vol. 3: The Danish Wars, 1657–1660. Helion & Company. ISBN 9781915113603.
