= Nizhyn Regiment =

Ukrainian Cossack military unit

Nizhyn Regiment Ніжинський полк
- Coat of Arms of the regimental capital
- Active: 1648−1782
- Type: Cossack Regiment
- Size: 10 sotnias, 991 Cossacks (1649)
- Garrison/HQ: Nizhyn, Cossack Hetmanate
- Engagements: Khmelnytsky Uprising; Battle of Batih; Russo-Polish War (1654–1667); Tsar Alexei's campaign; Siege of Smolensk (1654); Zolotorenko's Belarusian campaign; Siege of Gomel; Battle of Vilnius (1655); Siege of Stary Bykhaw (1654–1655); The Ruin; Russo-Turkish War (1676–1681); Russo-Turkish War (1686–1700); Crimean campaigns (1687–1689); Azov campaigns (1695–1696); Great Northern War; Russo-Turkish War (1768–1774)

Commanders
- Notable commanders: Ivan Zolotarenko; Vasyl Zolotarenko; Hryhoriy Hulyanytsky

Chernihiv Regiment Ніжинський полк (Ukrainian)
- Regiment of Cossack Hetmanate
- 1648–1782
- Coat of arms

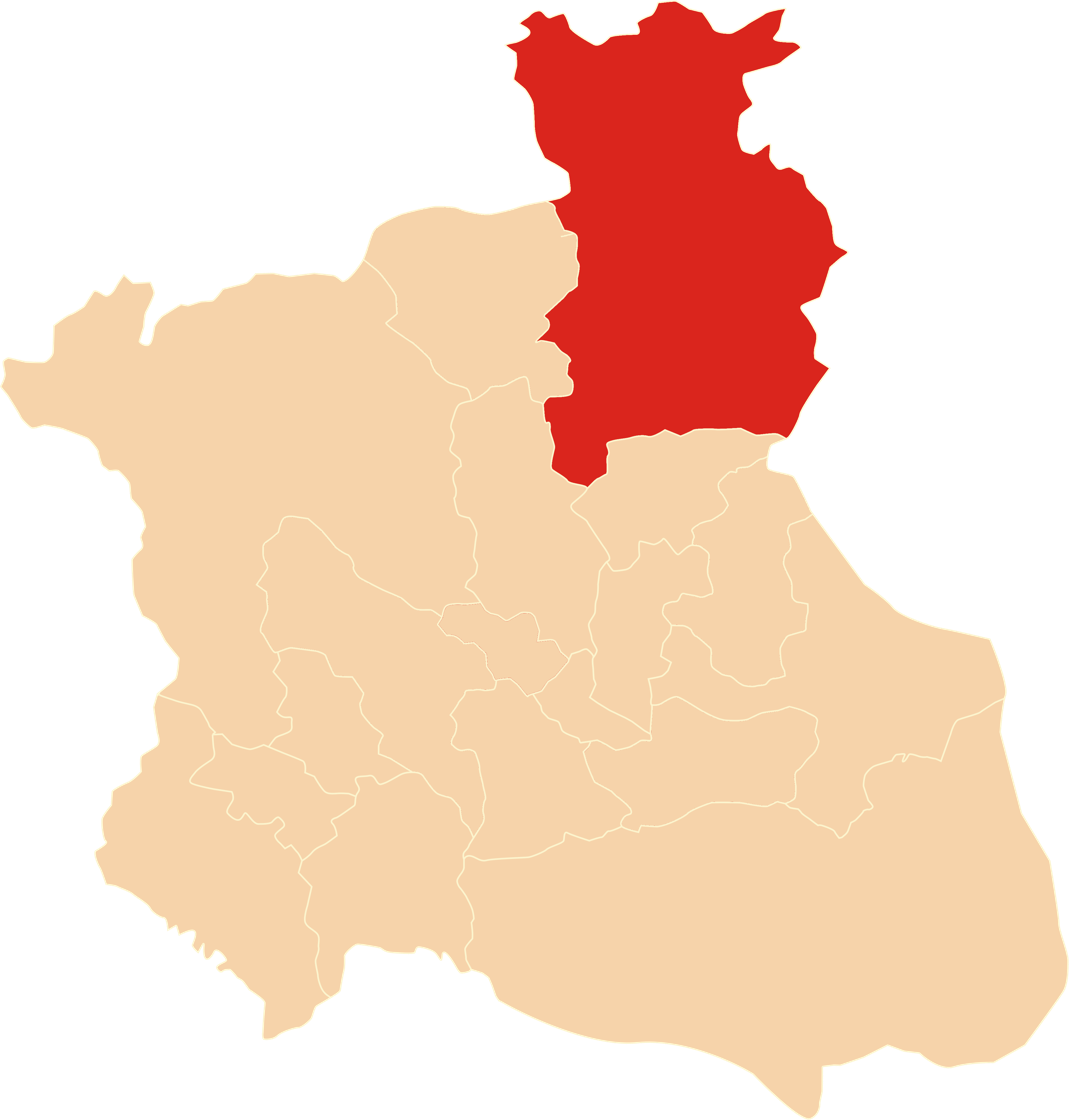
- Chernihiv Regiment (red) in the Cossack Hetmanate in 1660
- Capital: Nizhyn
- History
  - Khmelnytsky Uprising: 1648
  - Creation of Chernigov viceroyalty: 1782
Preceded by	Succeeded by
Kiev Voivodeship	Chernigov Governorate; Starodub Regiment
- Today part of: Ukraine

The Nizhyn Regiment (Ukrainian: Ніжинський полк) was one of ten territorial-administrative subdivisions of the Cossack Hetmanate. The regiment's capital was the city of Nizhyn, now in Chernihiv Oblast of northern Ukraine. Other major cities of the regiment were Hlukhiv and Baturyn.

The Nizhyn Regiment was founded in 1648, in 1653 it annexed the territory of the Novhorod-Siverskyi Regiment. Around that time the Regiment consisted of 10 sotnias. In 1654 add several hundred sotnia from the Chernihiv Regiment. Baturyn, and Hlukhiv the former capitals of the Hetmanate were part of the regiment.

On the territories of the regiment were 1 city, 3 towns, and 866 villages. In 1782 the regiment was disbanded by the order of the Empress Catherine II. All of the regiment's territories were included into the Chernihiv Governorate.

== History ==
1648 - creation of the regiment. Originally consisted of 10 hundreds.

1653 - the Novhorod regiment withdrew from this regiment for a short time.

1654 - several hundred Chernihiv regiments, all hundreds of the liquidated Novhorod regiment and the former Starodub district of Smolensk voivodeship were added to the Nizhyn regiment.

The regiment took part in the conquest of Belarus and parts of Lithuania led by Ivan Zolotarenko alongside Russian troops in 1654-1655.

The Cossacks of the Nizhyn Regiment took part in the uprisings of 1657-1658 under the leadership of Martyn Pushkar, and in 1658 under the leadership of Ivan Bezpaly.

1663 - 10 hundred joined the Starodub Regiment.

The regiment took part in the Crimean campaigns of 1687 and 1689, the Azov campaigns of 1695-1696, and the Northern War of 1700-1721.

According to the register of 1723, the Nizhyn Regiment consisted of 19 hundreds, which included 6,527 cavalry and 3,379 infantry Cossacks. The majority of the population were feudally dependent common peasants and assistants.

1752 - Olyshivska Sotnia and Mrynska Sotnia became part of the Kyiv Regiment.

1782 - the regiment is liquidated. The territory became part of the Chernihiv and Novhorod-Siverskyi governorates. At that time the Nizhyn regiment consisted of 22 hundred. The regiment had 1 city, 3 towns and 866 villages.

Throughout its historical existence, the regiment housed two hetman's capitals of the Cossack Hetmanate: Baturyn and Hlukhiv.

=== During the Hetmanship of Bohdan Khmelnytsky ===
==== 1648 ====
In the summer of 1648, the Nizhyn Cossack Regiment was formed in the liberated Nizhyn, which in the autumn of the same year numbered about 10,000 Cossacks. The newly-formed regiment bordered on the Chernihiv, Pereiaslav and Pryluky regiments. The territory of the Nizhyn Regiment occupied the left bank of the Desna River, starting from the town of Divytsia and ending with the delta of the Izota River. Its lands also stretched along both banks of the Seym River, from the delta to the confluence of the Kleven River, and one of the tributaries of the Desna, the Oster River, from the town of Mryn to the source of this river.

The first known colonel of the Nizhyn Regiment of the Khmelnytsky period was Prokopii Shumeiko. In the summer of 1648, under his leadership, the Nizhyn Cossacks marched on the Kodak Fortress.

Approaching Kodak, the Cossacks laid siege to it. The Cossacks could not capture the fortress with its strong defensive lines and the presence of a Polish garrison under the command of foreign officers. Only at the end of September 1648, due to lack of food and disease, which ruthlessly mowed the besieged, the Poles went to negotiations and capitulated.

==== 1649 ====
The following year, 1649, part of the Cossacks of the Nizhyn Regiment opposed the Grand Ducal Lithuanian Army led by Janusz Radziwiłł on the Hetmanate's northern border. The successful actions of the Cossacks in this region did not allow the Lithuanians to provide significant assistance to the army of John II Casimir Vasa and contributed to Khmelnytsky's victory in the military campaign of 1649.

In August 1649, due to the betrayal of the Tatars, Khmelnytsky was forced to conclude the Treaty of Zboriv with the Polish-Lithuanian Commonwealth. This register also included the Nizhyn Regiment led by Nizhyn Colonel Prokopii Shumeiko. It is still not possible to determine the exact number of Cossacks who were registered in the Nizhyn Regiment. According to the Ukrainian historian Mykhailo Hrushevsky, in the register of 1649 in the regiment:

Hundreds of all are recorded 11, but the last two are connected together, so in reality there are 10. Of these, 6 are Nizhyn, without any close surnames, and the seventh is probably also Nizhyn, named after his captain H. Kobyletsky. In addition, hundreds of Divotska, Berezovska, and hundreds of Nosivska and Kobyzka are connected together. Five hundred have a round of 100, the others a little less (95-99), Nosivsko-Kobyzchanska together 99… This is the smallest of the regiments: a total of 991 souls are inscribed in it.

"Chronicle of Colonel Hryhorii Hrabianka of Hadiach" mentions 983 Cossacks, and "History of Rus" - about 1,200 people.

==== 1651 ====
At the beginning of 1651, King of Poland and Grand Duke of Lithuania Jan II Casimir violated the terms of the Peace of Zboriv by invading the Hetmanate. The Khmelnytsky's Cossack army went to meet him. While the hetman opposed the Poles in the battles near Berestechko and Bila Tserkva, the left-bank Chernihiv and Nizhyn regiments, led by Chernihiv colonel Martyn Nebaba, defended the northern border of the Hetmanate from Janusz Radziwiłł's Lithuanian troops.

The following events are covered in detail in the Chronicle of the Seer. M. Nebaba's army, leaving a guard near the crossing of the Dnieper, encamped near Ripky. And when Radziwiłł's army began the crossing, the Cossack guard let the colonel know about it.

After the battle, the Cossack camp, food and weapons were seized by Lithuanian soldiers.

In 1651, under the terms of the Peace of Bila Tserkva, the Nizhyn Regiment was liquidated.

==== 1652 ====
In January–February 1652, 16,000 Polish troops entered the lands of the revived Chernihiv Voivodeship. Thus, the brother of the Field Crown Hetman Marcin Kalinowski, Samuel, was stationed in Nizhyn for the winter, and "the troops who had a large army with him, spread in various cities in the Dnieper and Zadesen."

Taking advantage of the liquidation of the Nizhyn Regiment, Polish official Adam Kisiel sent Mr. Luh, the governor, to his lands in the Nizhyn region. This caused a new wave of discontent and during the skirmish in Kobyzhchy Mr. Luh was killed. Colonel L. Sukhynia of Nizhyn punished those involved in the murder, but the Cossacks, dissatisfied with this, appealed to Colonel Stepan Pobodail of Chernihiv to address their deputy as hetman. S. Pobodailo agreed and went to B. Khmelnytsky. This visit of the colonel to the hetman led to the fact that B. Khmelnytsky, having studied the situation in detail, executed a number of persons involved in illegal actions. It is quite possible that L. Sukhynia was among them, because after these events his name is no longer mentioned, and Ivan Zolotarenko was appointed the new Nizhyn colonel.

==== 1653 ====
The following year, 1653, the Cossacks of the Pereiaslav, Chernihiv, and Nizhyn regiments, led by Colonel I. Zolotarenko of Nizhyn, again opposed the Lithuanian troops on the northern border of the Hetmanate. The hetman also sent some Tatar detachments to help I. Zolotarenko. There were no major battles, and the war of 1653 in the Nizhyn region was marked by only minor skirmishes, after which Lithuanian troops retreated to their previous positions.

The next significant military action with the participation of the Cossacks of the Nizhyn Regiment began in May 1654, when Russia, in accordance with the terms of the Pereiaslav Council, declared war on the Commonwealth and invaded the territory of the Grand Duchy of Lithuania. To help the Russians, the hetman sent the Chernihiv, Nizhyn and Pereiaslav regiments led by Colonel I. Zolotarenko of Nizhyn, who received the post of acting hetman. The Cossack troops were 20,000 strong. In addition, Hetman B. Khmelnytsky, according to Hryhorii Hrabianka, allowed anyone who wanted to go on a campaign. Modern Nizhyn local historian Oleksandr Urivalkin provides information about the constituent parts of I. Zolotarenko's army: Nizhyn Regiment of H. Kobyletsky, Regiment of Tymofii Zolotarenko, Chernihiv Regiment of Pobodaila, Starodub Regiment of Pasha, Borzniansky Regiment of Zabila and S. Kurbatsky, Regiment of Yu. Semenov and V. Zolotarenko's detachment, which acted directly together with Oleksii Mykhailovych's troops in the Smolensk region.

=== During the Hetmanship of Ivan Mazepa ===
==== 1687 ====
In 1687 a coup d'état was carried out, during which the officer of the Nizhyn Regiment also took part. Ivan Mazepa was appointed head of the Hetmanate, which in turn only deepened the internal conflicts between the Cossacks.

Immediately after his election in 1687, Hetman I. Mazepa signed with the Russian government the Kolomatsky Articles, which determined the place and status of the Left Bank of Ukraine as part of the Moscow State. Thus, the second article of the agreement, submitted in the Chronicle of Samiil Wieliczka, directly concerns the city of Nizhyn and is entitled "On the voivode and hostages in Kyiv, Pereiaslav, Chernihiv, Nizhyn, Ostra…" It was in these cities were to be Russian voivodes, who relied on pre-defined in the Ukrainian-Russian treaties functions and powers.

The initial period of the new hetman's rule was marked by an almost radical change of persons who held regimental and hundreds of positions in the Cossack regiments of the Left Bank of Ukraine. According to S. Pavlenko's calculations, during 1687-1693 the personnel potential of the Hetmanate was renewed by almost 70%. These changes also affected the Nizhyn Regiment led by Stepan Zabila. The following representatives of the Cossack officers were sent to the hundreds of towns of the regiment: Hryhorii Samoilovych to Nova Mlyny, Samiilo Afanasiev to Verkiivka, Karpo Mankivsky to Sheptaky and others.

==== 1689 ====
In 1689, Ukraine was involved in the preparation of the second Crimean campaign. On April 24, 1689, 112,000 Russian riflemen and 50,000 Ukrainian Cossacks (including S. Zabila's Nizhyn Regiment) under the command of Vasyl Holitsyn and I. Mazepa again marched on the Crimean Khanate.

On August 10, 1689, the large Ukrainian embassy of I. Mazepa arrived in Moscow. It is well known that among the Ukrainian government officials accompanying the hetman was Nizhyn Colonel S. Zabila. After the beginning of 1694, his name is no longer mentioned in the historical literature. Fr. During the campaign, the Cossacks deal a devastating blow to the Budzha horde, capture the fortress of Hinkushli and release a number of prisoners. Among the captured trophies, historians mention 10 guns.

=== In 1700–1709 ===
In the autumn of 1700, by order of Peter I, Hetman I. Mazepa sent a corps of Cossacks to the Baltics to help the Moscow army, which had entered the war with the Kingdom of Sweden. Colonel Ivan Obidovsky of Nizhyn was appointed hetman of the Cossack troops of the Poltava, Kyiv, and Nizhyn regiments. "Mazepa, entrusting his nephew with a large Cossack unit, clearly contributed to his hardening, maturing, gaining experience in the difficult conditions of war. But regiments of 7,290 soldiers arrived in Narva late." On November 19, the Russians suffered a crushing defeat at the hands of the Swedish army led by Charles XII.

The appearance of I. Obidovsky's corps in the Baltics, the unexpected raids of the Ukrainian Cossacks deep into the territory of the Swedes forced Charles XII to place troops in the border fortresses and to live in constant anticipation of the attack. After long meetings, the Swedish command decided to conduct a punitive expedition against the Cossack troops from Ukraine. However, General Klipsler's 4,000-strong corps approached Gdov and did not dare to storm the city, as there were many defenders in it.

Due to the failures of the war with the Swedes, relations between Mazepa and Sich also worsened. Thus, in June 1705, the hetman sent several hundred Nizhyn regiments to the Duma deacon Omelian Ukrainets with an order to "tame those Zaporozhian dogs." Nizhyn residents arrived in Zaporizhia, but fate saved them from the shedding of fraternal blood. The fact is that Peter I decided not to anger the Cossacks in such difficult conditions and ordered to pay them a salary. After that, the Nizhyn Regiment returned home safely.

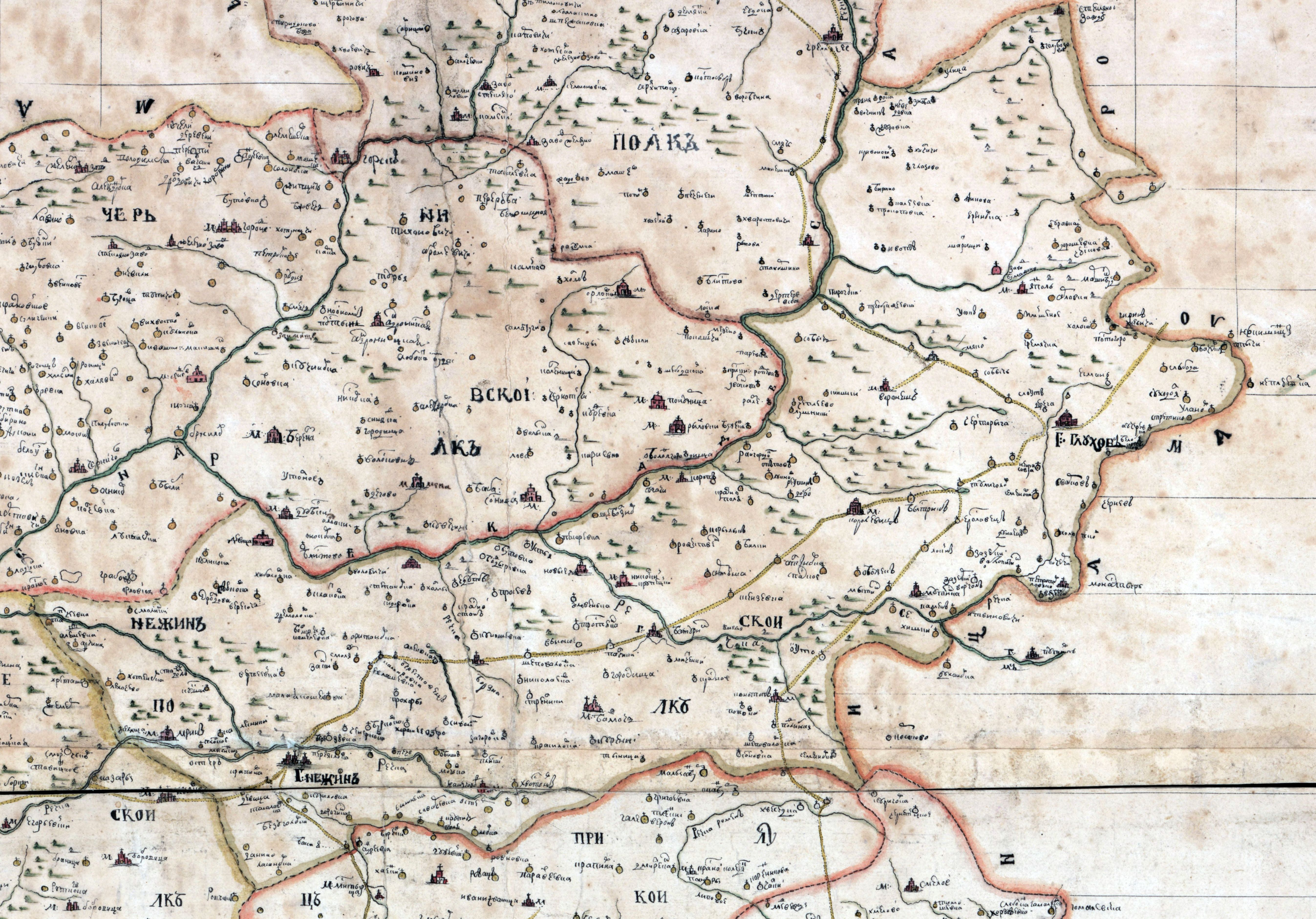
Map of Nizhyn Regiment in the mid-18th century

=== During the Russo-Turkish War (1768–1774) ===
In 1768 a new Russo-Turkish war began. Russian armies under the command of O. Holitsyn and Peter Rumiantsev went to the Black Sea region. The Cossacks were also involved. The 2nd Army also included 6,000 Cossacks from the Chernihiv and Nizhyn Regiments under the command of P. Myloradovych, P. Rozumovsky, and Oleksandr Bezborodko. They fought near Khotyn and won.

== Administrative divisions ==
According to the 1649 Registry of the Zaporozhian Host the regiment included the following sotnias:

- Nizhyn (5)
- Divytsia
- Kobylets
- Berezivka
- Nosivka and Kobyzhcha
