= Leslie (Russian nobility) =

Russian noble family of Scottish origin

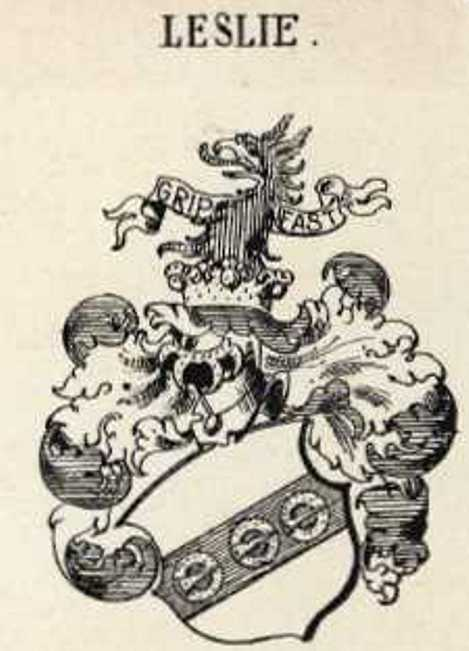
- Arms of family Leslie
- Parent house: Leslie baronets
- Country: Russian Empire
- Estates: Gerchikovo, Uvarovo

The Leslie family (Russian: Лесли) is the name of Russian noble family of Scottish origin.

== History ==
Descendants of Alexander Leslie of Auchintoul, who was a Scottish soldier in Swedish and General in Russian service. In 1654 he wrested Smolensk from the Poles and became the Tsar's governor/voivode there. Auchintoul fought for the Montrosians in the English Civil War. He was the son of William Leslie, third laird of Crichie, a branch of the Balquhain Leslies. He was commander of Russian forces during the Siege of Smolensk (1654), one of the first great events of the Russo-Polish War (1654–67).

== Descendants ==
- Alexander Leslie of Auchintoul, General and voivode of Smolensk, owner of Gerchikovo manor had three sons, Colonel Alexander, Yakov-John and Colonel Fedor-Theodore (?-1695), commander of Belgorodski Regiment.
  - John Leslie of Balquhain, son of General Alexander Leslie, was a Scottish cavalry colonel in Russian service killed in the storming of Igolwitz castle on 30 August 1655, he married a daughter of Colonel Crawford in Muscovy, though there are at least three Crawfords with that rank in the Russian service, so it's not entirely clear who is meant.

Family had several generals during Great Northern War, War of the Polish Succession and Russo-Turkish War (1735–1739).

- Leslie, Dmitri Egorovich, (1748—1815) — major general, chief of 1st Chuguevsky Cossack regular regiment (1797—1798).
- Lesli, Sergey Ivanovich, (1758—1826) - commander of Smolensk Zemskoe Narodnoe Opolcheniye in 1812.
- Leslie, Yuri Federovich, (? — 1737) — major general, under command of Generalfeldmarschall Peter Lacy in Siege of Danzig (1734).
