= Alexander Leslie of Auchintoul =

Russian general (1590–1663)

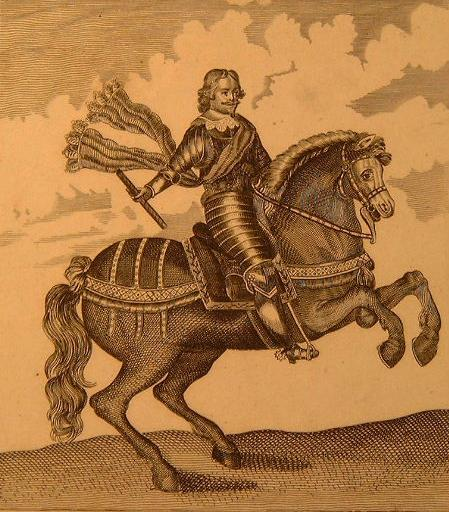
- Alexander Leslie of Auchintoul
- Born: 1590; Aberdeenshire, Scotland
- Died: 1663 (aged 72–73); Smolensk, Russia
- Military career
- Allegiance: Scotland; Poland–Lithuania; (yes) Sweden; Russia
- Rank: Colonel (Sweden); General (Russia)
- Conflicts: Smolensk War; English Civil War; Russo-Polish War; Siege of Smolensk; Russo-Swedish War; Siege of Riga

Alexander Leslie of Auchintoul (1590–1663) was a Scottish soldier in Swedish and Russian service. He was Russia's first general and a reformer of the Muscovite army in cooperation with the boyar Boris Morozov. He was the son of William Leslie, third laird of Crichie, a branch of the Balquhain Leslies. In 1618, he was an officer in Polish employ, captured by the Russians, but released. He was the owner of Gerchikovo manor and the voivode of Smolensk.

== Military career ==
=== In Sweden and Russia ===
In 1629 he was a colonel in Sweden, sent by King Gustav II Adolf on a mission to Moscow and entered the Tsar's service. During the audience by king Michael I of Russia as a member of Swedish mission in Russia he gave a petition for military service in Russia in January 1630. Since March 1630 Colonel Leslie in Russian service. Leslie returned to Sweden in April 1631 to inform Gustav Adolf that war between Russia and Poland was imminent. In 1631 he recruited thousands of soldiers in western countries including Scotland and supervised the first regiments of "foreign order" ("Полки нового строя" or "Полки иноземного строя", Polki novovo (inozemnovo) stroya), that was the Russian term that was used to describe military units organised and armed along western lines. After the capitulation of Mikhail Shein in the Siege of Smolensk (1632-33) to the Commonwealth army his regiment was the only one to leave the battlefield with flags and arms. During that siege he accused an Englishman, Colonel Sanderson, of treason, and killed him in a fight. He subsequently advanced to the rank of a Russian General. Leslie returned to Scotland after the unhappy outcome of the Smolensk War. Charles I of England wrote to Russian Tsar Mikhail Fyodorovich on behalf of Leslie in March 1637 saying that he was returning to Britain on private business. He writes:

Charles, be the Grace of God, King, &c., To the Most high, mightie, and right noble Prince, The Great Lord Emperour and Great Duik Michaell Pheodor, M'rch of All Russia, sole Commander of Volodomer, Moskoe, Novogarod, King of Cazan, king of Astroean, King of Siberia, Lord of Vobskey, and great Duik of Smoleskey, Tueskey, Vgorskey, Pannskey, Vatskey, Bolgaskey, and of the other cuntreyis; Lord and Great Duik of Xovogored in the Lower Cuntreyis, of Cheringo, Rezan, Polotzkey, Eostone, Yares, Lanskey, Belozeisky, Leuslandskey, Yondeskey, Obdoiskey, Condinskey, And of all the northerne parts Lord and Commander …

Greeting.—Most Excellent Prince, and dear brother and freind. We have sene and pervsed your imperiall Letters of Commission and credance that your Ma^{tie} our dear brother, hath gevin to your Ma^{tie} Genera Major Sir Alex. Leslie, one of our faythfull subjects of our kingdome of Scotland, of noble and illustrous descent;

Which letter is thrughout all our dominions, according to our imperiall requeist, shal be in all brotherlie requeist observed and performed; And that so much the more becaus your Emperial affection hath bene most enclyned to have our faythfull subjects' armes and valoris imployed in your Ma^{teis} warres,

And in consideration thairof hath made our said subject Sir Alexander Leslie Major-Generall of your Ma^{teis} warlyk forces, which preferment is by ws most kyndlie accepted and greatlie esteamed, in preferring one of our Scotts subjects to such high diguitie, assureing your Ma^{tie} (our dear brother) from ws that ther is no subject in our dominions, who ar willing to serve your Ma^{teis} in the qualitie of commander or souldier, bot we will give them our frie leave, consent, and libertie to serve your Ma^{tie}, which we have [thought] good to certifie vnto your highnes by these our letteris, not doubting bot your Ma^{tie} will at our requeist continew towards your Ma^{teis} servants our subjects all perfection and promotion; Whom we desire your Ma^{tie} will continew as yow have begun to advance him, as lykwyse to performe vnto him, and all others our subjects vnder your Ma^{teis} Command, as ar mentionat in your Ma^{teis} imperiall Commission and letteris of Credence gevin vnto him:

Moreover, we have, in regard of your Emperial Commission gevin to your Ma^{teis} Generall, Sir Alexander Leslie, granted libertie vnto our faytlit'ull subject Captan David Leslie for to retume him selff vnto your Ma^{teis} emperiall court ther, to attend your Ma^{teis} service, of whois wisdome, valour, and faythfulnes we have thought good to certifie your Ma^{tie} as descendit from noble, illustruous, and marschall parentage, and quho in his owin persone hath gained to him selff great honour, and hath gevin sufficient prooff thairof for many yeires that he hath caryed charge in the qualitie of a Commander in the Warres of France, Germanie, Sweden, and the Low Countreyes :

Therfor [having] thought good to recommend him with these our saids letteris of recommendation vnto your Ma^{tie}, that he may be employed according to his qualitie, worth, and merite. Our part shalbe to doe the lyk. And to answer your Ma^{tie}, our dear brother, gratious inclination and disposition by all princelie offices of love and respects, to manteane and preserve the amitie and mutuall correspondencie [of] long and happie continuance between our Crounes and Kingdomes : And so we leave your Ma^{tie} to the protection of Almightie God.—

From our Palace of Westminster, the 26 of Feb., in the 7 yeir of our regne of Great Britane, France, and Irland.

Subscribitur, Charles R."

— Charles I (1885). Earl of Stirling's Register of Royal Letters. Vol. 2. pp. 579–580.

=== Civil War ===
Auchintoul fought with James Graham, 1st Marquess of Montrose, in the Civil War. He was captured at the Battle of Philiphaugh and, by the direct intervention of the victor, Lieutenant General David Leslie, whom he had served with in Russia, was dealt with leniently compared to other prisoners (most of whom were executed after the battle). Auchintoul was spared (along with Lord Gray), but was banished from Scotland for life.

=== Return to Russia by 1647 ===
So sentenced, Auchintoul returned to Russia at some point after that, with a recommendation from King Charles I and finally settled in Muscovy in 1647. He converted to Orthodoxy in September 1652, his godfather was Prince Ilya Miloslavsky, after that act he received 23,000 silver rubles. Auchintoul was commander of the Russian forces during the Siege of Smolensk (1654), one of the first great events of the Russo-Polish War (1654–67). After the victory he was nominated Governor of Smolensk by the tsar.

== Family ==
- Alexander Leslie of Auchintoul, General and voivode of Smolensk had three sons, Colonel Alexander, Yakov-John and Colonel Fedor-Theodore (?-1695), commander of Belgorodski Regiment.
  - John Leslie of Balquhain, son of General Alexander Leslie, was a Scottish cavalry colonel in Russian service killed in the storming of Igolwitz Castle on 30 August 1655, he married a daughter of Colonel Crawford in Muscovy, though there are at least three Crawfords with that rank in the Russian service, so it's not entirely clear who is meant.

== See also ==
- Clan Leslie
- Leslie baronets
- Leslie of Smolensk
- Scotland and the Thirty Years' War
