= Battle of Verkhovichi =

1655 battle part of Russo-Polish War

- Part of the Russo-Polish War (1654–1667) and Tsar Alexei's campaign of 1654–1655
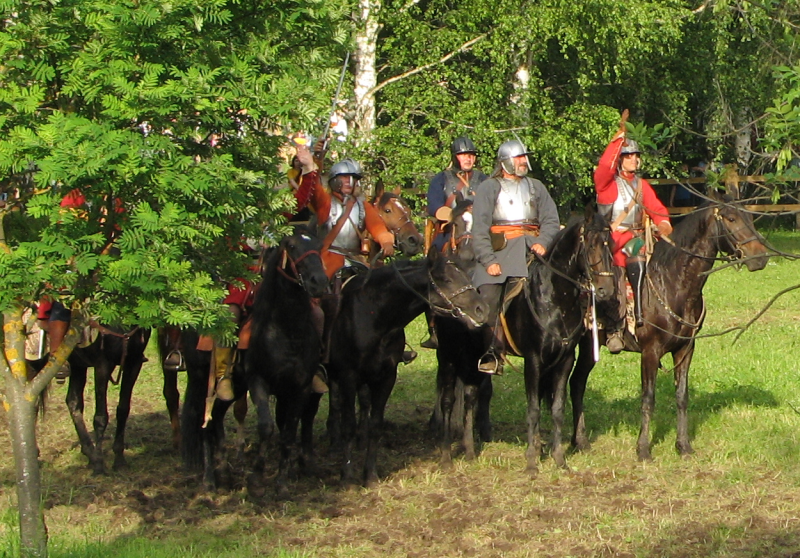
- Knyaz Semyon Urusov waiting for the Lithuanian attack, reconstruction of the battle in Moscow, Vernadsky Avenue
Date	17 November 1655
Location	Verkhovichi, Brest Litovsk Voivodeship, Polish-Lithuanian Commonwealth (Present-day Belarus)
Result	Russian victory

Belligerents
Polish-Lithuanian Commonwealth	Tsardom of Russia

Commanders and leaders
(Polish–Lithuanian Commonwealth) Paweł Jan Sapieha	Semyon Urusov

Strength
5,300–7,800	4,500

Casualties and losses
1,000 killed 50 captured 28 standards 4 cannons	Heavy

The battle of Verkhovichi was a battle between Russians and Poles-Lithuanians, took place near village of Verkhovichi 17 November 1655 during Russo-Polish War. The battle is notable for the fact that the weaker and surrounded troops were able to completely defeat the army that surrounded them and capture the spoils.

== Background ==
=== Political situation ===
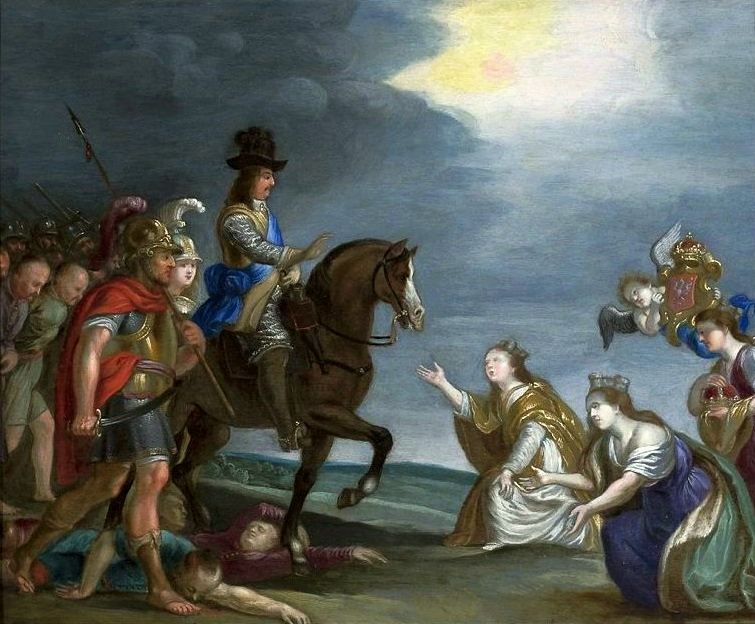
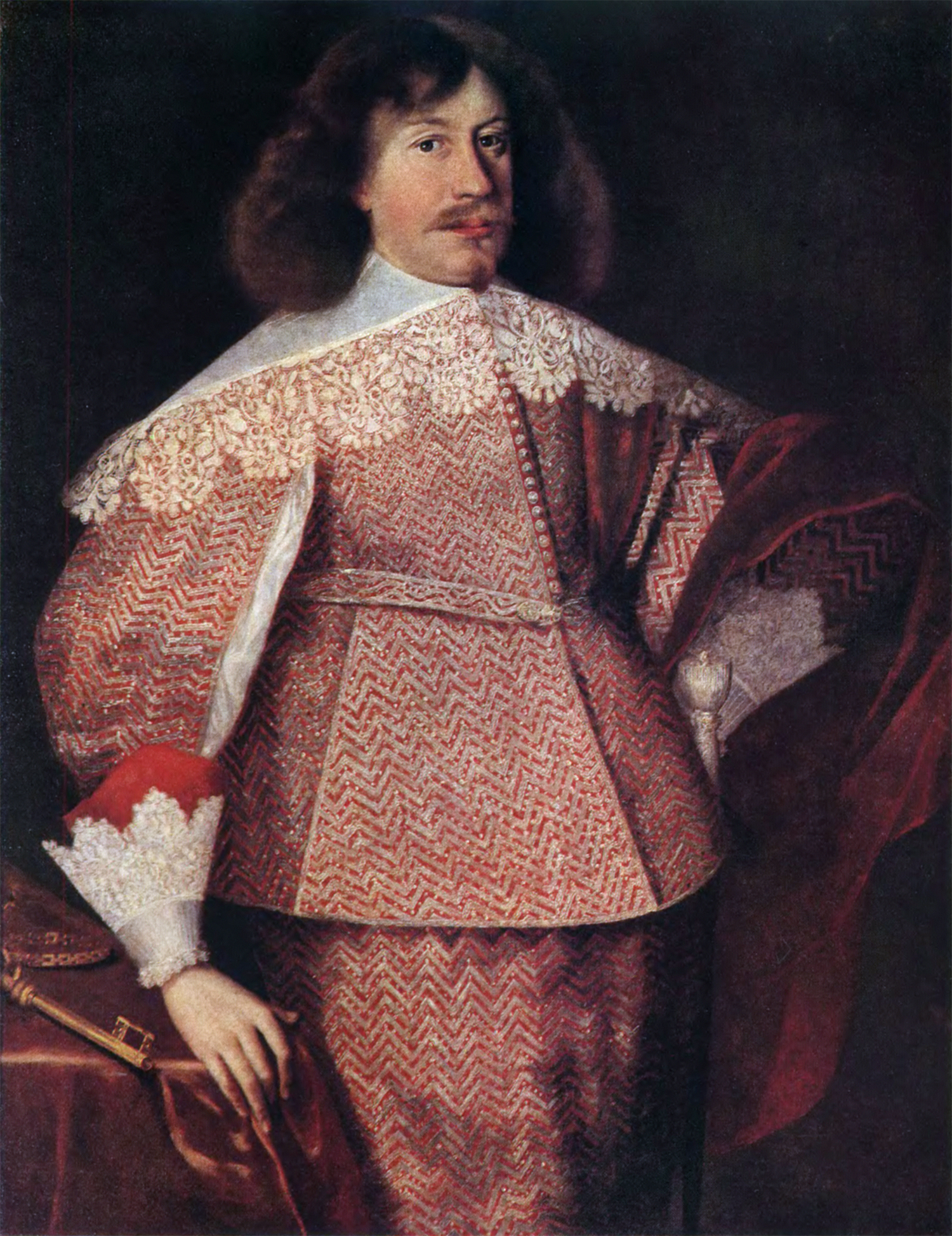
From left to right
1: Swedish king Carl X Gustav and his triumph against Polish-Lithuanian Commonwealth
2: Janusz Radziwiłł "the Young", leader of the pro-Swedish party in Grand Duchy of Lithuania
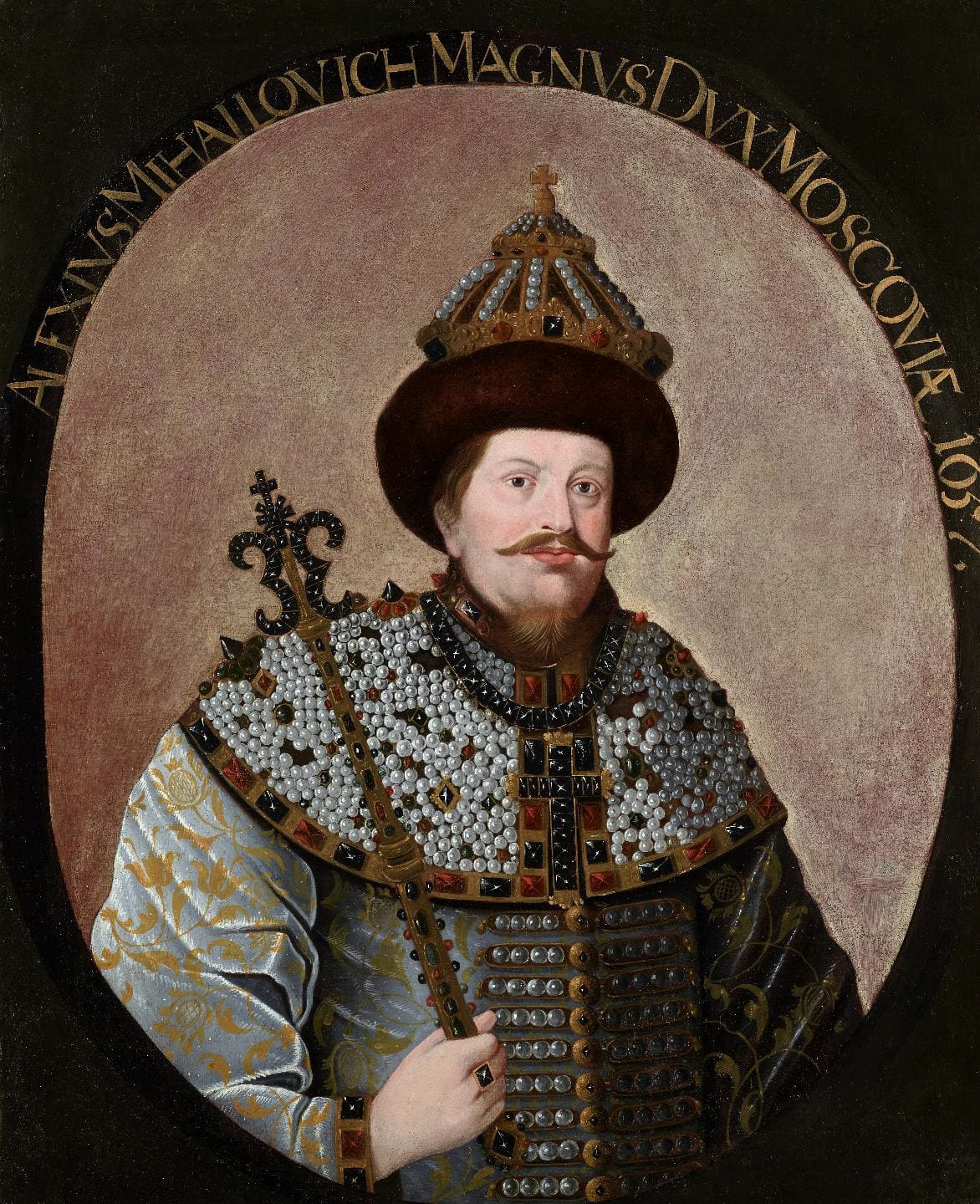
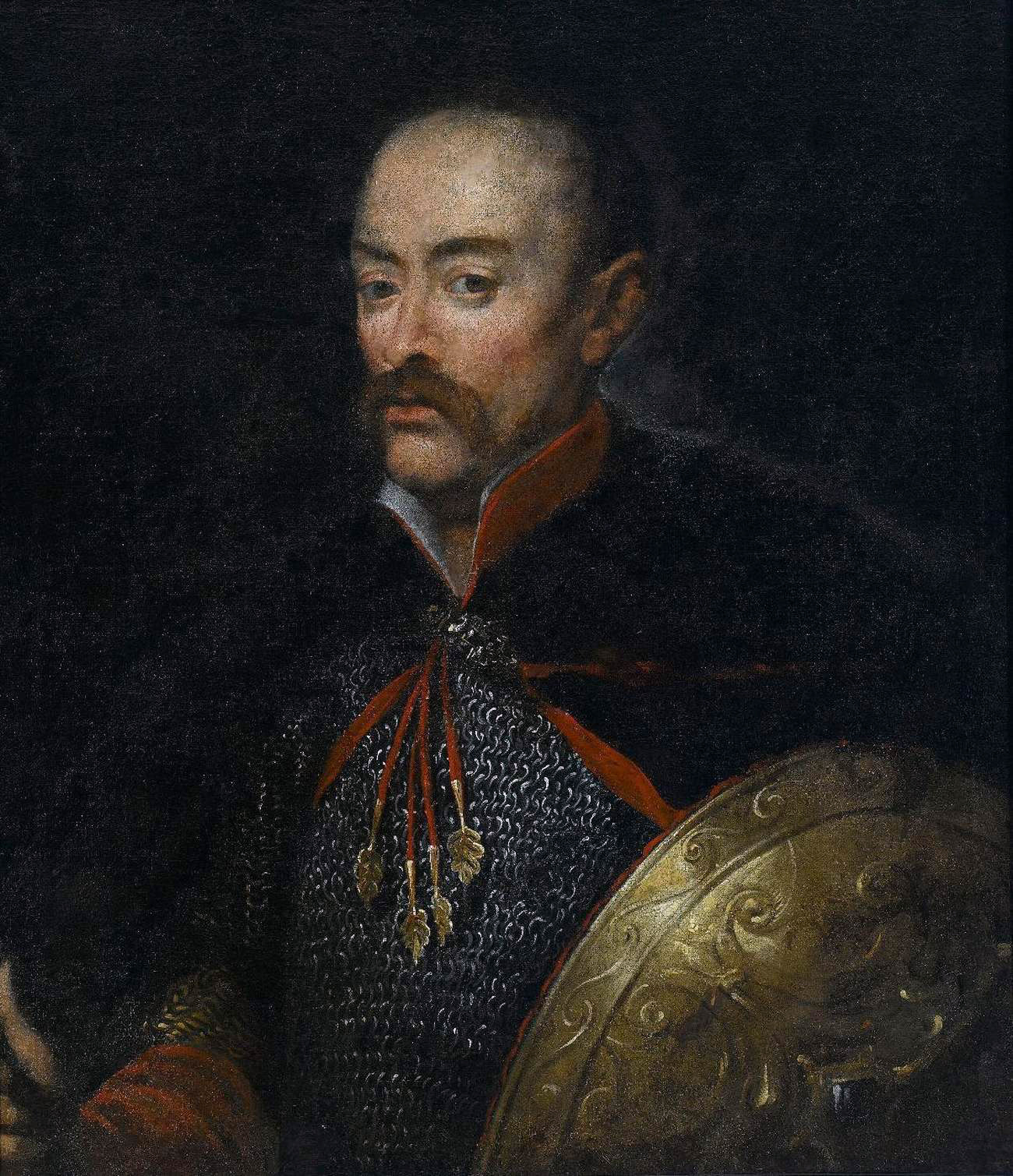
From left to right
1: Russian Tsar Alexis I Mikhailovich, portrait of 1657
2: Hetman Wincenty Korwin Gosiewski, He was one of the first to cooperate with Muscovy in Grand Duchy of Lithuania

In the summer of 1655, Sweden invaded the Polish-Lithuanian Commonwealth, and the Swedish military successes weakened the Lithuanians' loyalty to Warsaw. Russian offensive on Lithuania reached its epic after Russian victory over Lithuanians in the battle of Vilnius, muscovites occupied it on July 31. At the same time, the Russians were trying to consolidate their power in the region diplomatically. After Janusz Radziwiłł proposed to the Swedish king Charles X Gustav to accept Lithuania as a citizen, Vasily Likharev went to meet with Hetman Wincenty Gosiewski. In a personal dialogue, he learned that a satisfied majority of the Lithuanian aristocracy opposed the Swedes. The goal of Russian diplomacy was to convert to pro-Moscow position as many discontented influential Lithuanians as possible, led by Gosiewski. However, the latter was arrested. By this time Brest had become the capital of the Grand Duchy of Lithuania. A significant number of gentry gathered here and all those who disagreed with the pro-Swedish position fled to this place. Russian boyar Fyodor Rtishchev was negotiating with Paweł Jan Sapieha at that time, the latter agreed to a halt in hostilities and sent his ambassador to Moscow. However, the rapid growth of Swedish influence worried Alexis Mikhailovich. Even before he learned about the results of Rtishchev's mission, voivode Semyon Urusov began his campaign to the west in order to win the race for power in Lithuania from the Swedes.

=== Brest campaign of 1655 ===
According to contemporaries, 30,000 people went on a campaign, but modern authors sharply criticize these figures, noting that there were 10,000 in the entire region, of which c. 4,000 went on a march to Brest from Kovno. Lithuanian army intended for the defense of the city had 5,300 to 7,800. The Russian army, which was going on a campaign, was confident that it would not meet resistance, so they left guns in the rear. Despite the initial success in the campaign, the Russians were unexpectedly attacked directly near Brest and were defeated, albeit partially, because they were able to repel the attacks and calmly retreat 25 versts. The Russians lost 356 killed and captured.

== Battle ==
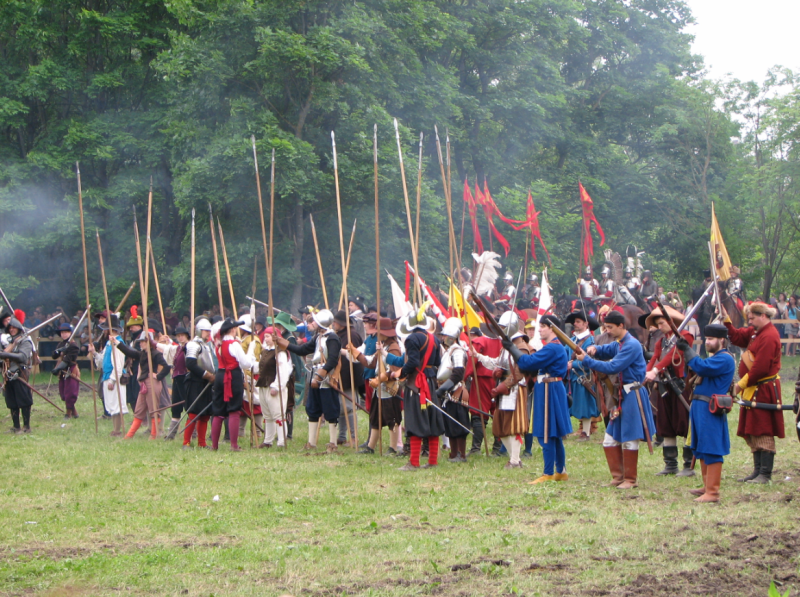
Lithuanian army "Goes out into the field", reconstruction

On 15 November during the retreat of the Russians to Verkhovichi, they were surrounded by Lithuanians. They were besieged for more than two days, and rejected the request for surrender. The Lithuanians began planning an attack, the unpopular Urusov decided to resist to the end, so he divided his forces into two parts, when the Lithuanians launched an offensive, he quickly crushed the flanks of the vanguard, destroying it and putting the Lithuanians to flight. They lost 28 banners, all artillery, and 1,000 dead. Russian losses were also heavy. Urusov, in his letter to the tsar, stated that he allegedly saw the archangel Michael, and that it was he who brought him victory.
