= Siege of Stary Bykhaw (1654–1655) =

- Part of the Russo-Polish War (1654–1667) and Tsar Alexei's campaign of 1654–1655
Date	1654–1655
Location	Bykhaw, Polish-Lithuanian Commonwealth (Present-day Belarus)
Result	Polish-Lithuanian victory

Belligerents
Polish-Lithuanian Commonwealth	Cossack Hetmanate; Tsardom of Russia

Commanders and leaders
Unknown	Ivan Zolotarenko (DOW); Yakhno Korobko; Aleksey Trubetskoy

Strength
First siege 4,000; 4 heavy guns 26 field guns Second Siege unknown	First siege 8,000–12,000; Second Siege unknown 10,000

Casualties and losses
Unknown	Heavy

The siege of Stary Bykhaw was a military siege undertaken by the Cossack and Russians 1654–1655 against the city of Stary Bykhaw. The siege was part of the Russo-Polish War (1654–1667), and resulted in a Polish-Lithuanian victory.

== Background ==
At the beginning of the Russo-Polish War of 1654-1667, a large-scale offensive of Russian troops on the lands of the Grand Duchy of Lithuania unfolded. As a sign of mutual assistance in recognition of the authority of Tsar Alexei Mikhailovich over Ukraine, Hetman Bohdan Khmelnitsky sent the Cossack corps of Ivan Zolotarenko (about 20,000 people in the Nizhyn, Chernigov and Starodub regiments) to support the Russian troops.

== Siege ==
=== Siege in 1654 ===
Siege in 1654 During the summer campaign of the Polish-Russian War, Bykhiv found itself in the zone of operations of a Cossack corps of about 20 thousand soldiers commanded by Colonel Ivan Zolotarenko in 1654. After taking Novy Bykhaw, on 8 September 1654, the Cossacks began the siege of Bykhaw, which was to become the main center of the areas they controlled. The fortress was manned by 2,000 citizens, 600 mercenaries, 200 hajduks, 100 Dragoons, 300 nobles and about 1,000 Jews, the artillery consisted of 4 heavy guns and 26 field guns. The defenders of Bykhaw did not limit themselves to defensive actions and during the siege lasting from 8 September to 26 November 1654, they made numerous raids on Cossack positions, inflicting severe losses on them. Zolotarenko did not dare to undertake any assault on the city at that time and limited himself to blocking it, counting on the fact that the defenders, cut off from their rear and deprived of hope for relief, would finally decide to capitulate. The failures, the large losses inflicted by the defenders, the arrival of winter and conflicts with Muscovite troops meant that at the end of November he decided to break the siege and withdrew to a winter camp in Novy Bykhaw, located about 20 kilometres to the south. On 28 December, Samuel Oskierka's volunteer units reached Bykhaw.

=== Siege in 1655 ===
In view of the concentration of the Commonwealth army on the siege of Mogilev from 16 February 1655, at the turn of April and May 1655 Ivan Zolotarenko's Cossack troops left Novy Bykhiv and in mid-May began the second siege of Bykhiv, whose garrison in the spring of 1655 was reinforced by Kazimierz Leon Sapieha with new dragoon and infantry regiments, partially paid from the Commonwealth treasury. The city rejected the offer of capitulation and put up a fierce resistance to the Cossacks. In connection with the specter of a prolonged siege, only the Borzhany colonel Yakhno Korobko with part of the infantry remained at Bykhiv, blocking the garrison. Even the three-week stay of Alexei Trubetskoy 's 10,000 corps in July and August 1655 did not contribute to the capture of the fortress, because the defenders heroically repelled subsequent attacks, inflicting heavy losses on the enemy. During this siege on October 17, 1655, Ivan Zolotoreenko himself was killed by the defenders' fire.

== Aftermath ==
In June 1659, Muscovite troops under the command of Ivan Ivanovich Labanov Rostovsky and Semen Zmiyev began a siege of the fortress, which they were unable to capture for several months. Stary Bykhiv remained an invincible fortress until December 1659, constituting the only enclave of the Commonwealth's power on the Dnieper, and the attitude of its crew became an example for decades to come. The fortress was captured by Muscovite troops as a result of treason only on December 14, 1659. The Cossack colonel commanding the defense, Ivan Nechai, was exiled to Siberia by the Russians.

However, in the winter of 1660-1661, the fortress was retaken by Polish troops under the command of Stefan Czarniecki.
