= Battle of Nowa Woda =

Battle between Lithuanian and Russian forces

Coordinates: 54.48°N 32.04°E

- Part of Russo-Polish War of 1654–1667 and Tsar Alexei's campaign of 1654–1655
Date	25 June 1654
Location	Bogdanov Kholm near Smolensk
Result	Lithuanian victory

Belligerents
Polish–Lithuanian Commonwealth	Tsardom of Russia

Commanders and leaders
Herman Ganskopf	Nikita Odoevsky

Strength
2,500	8,000

Casualties and losses
Light	Heavy

The Battle of Nowa Woda was an armed struggle between a Lithuanian raiding party led by Herman Ganskopf and the vanguard of the Russian army led by Nikita Odoevsky, which took place on 25 June 1654, and ended with a Polish-Lithuanian victory. 19th-century historians such as Edward Kotłubaj and Ludwik Kubala mistranslated and misidentified the site of the battle as "Nowa Woda"; Igor Babulin (2018) demonstrated that the clash took place at Bogdanowa Okolica or Bogdanov Kholm, a hill about 5 kilometres northeast of Smolensk on the right bank of the Dnieper. (Note: "Autor przekonywająco udowodnił, iż w wyniku nieprawidłowej interpretacji tekstu źródłowego przez dziewiętnastowiecznych badaczy (Edwarda Kotłubaja, Ludwika Kubalę) do narracji historiografi cznej trafi ło kilka błędnych nazw geografi cznych. Nowa Woda pod Smoleńskiem, gdzie miało dojść do starcia podjazdu litewskiego Hermana Ganskopfa z awangardą wojsk carskich dowodzoną przez Nikitę Odojewskiego, to Bogdanowa Okolica (s. 63).")

== Background ==
When the Russian army threatened to invade the Grand Duchy of Lithuania in early 1654, King John II Casimir Vasa convened the Sejm in March 1654 under the chairmanship of Franciszek Dubrawski, Chamberlain of Przemyśl. In May 1664, the invasion began. The Sejm could not agree on how to respond, and by July, discussions were broken up by the deputies with a Liberum veto. In addition, no effective methods were devised to defend the Polish-Lithuanian state. Both the grand bullahs (position of hetman), of the Crown and Lithuania, were vacant after the death of Janusz Kiszka, but the King, despite the fact that Prince Radziwiłł was in opposition to him, conferred the bullah on him. However, fearing similar consequences as those which arose during the reign of King Sigismund through the humiliation of Duke Krzysztof Radziwiłł, the king granted him the position, and Wincenty Korwin Gosiewski became the field hetman. There were disputes between Radziwiłł and Gosiewski. The situation was aggravated by the King's attempts to deprive Radziwiłł of his post, it was also made worse by the fact that Gosiewski was a treasurer and had no intention of donating money to pay the Lithuanian army. In this atmosphere actions were initiated.

== Battle ==
There was a need for reconnaissance, so Radziwiłł sent Herman Ganskopf (mistranslated as Ganzhoff) with a detachment consisting of several light banners and dragoujes, in general 2500 men, to Dochorobuzh. Ganskopf, passing Smolensk, on 25 June met a vanguard of 8,000 Muscovite forces at Bogdanowa Okolica or Bogdanov Kholm (mistranslated as Nowa Woda). The Tsar's army was celebrating St John's Day. After the Russian soldiers got drunk and fell asleep, Ganskopf took advantage of this and attacked in the night. The battle lasted until morning. When he saw fresh troops coming, Ganskopf retreated to Orsha where there was a Lithuanian camp. Ganskopf carried 13 captured banners to Radziwiłł, as well as seven Muscovite Bojars who were taken prisoner.

== Aftermath ==
After breaking up the Russian forces, at the same time Rotmistrz Lipnitsky achieved victory by dispersing the Moscow forces at the river Dzvina and near Polon, and captured several major Bojars, including Boris Marchalov, the Tsar's Podchai. On 6 July, the Tsar laid siege to Smolensk, which capitulated on 16 September. Not waiting, Radziwiłł moved with his army in August, where he smashed a 40-thousand-strong Russian detachment in the great battle of Skhlow.

== Bibliography ==
- Bobiatyński, Konrad (2019). "Игорь Бабулин, Смоленский поход и битва при Шепелевичах 1654 года, Москва 2018, Русские Витязи, ss. 228, Ратное дело (review)" (PDF). Kwartalnik Historyczny (in Polish). 126 (2): 399–405.
- Hrytskievich, Anatol (2005). "Вайна Расіі з Рэччу Паспалітай 1654—67" [War of Russia with the Commonwealth 1654–1667]. Grand Duchy of Lithuania: Encyclopedia (in Belarusian). Vol. 1. Minsk: Piatrus Brouka Belarusian Encyclopedia. Archived from the original on 9 September 2026.
- Kotłubaj, Edward (1859). Życie Janusza Radziwiłła (in Polish). Wilno: Mindelshon księgarnia.
