= Siege of Gomel =

- Part of the Zolotarenko's Belarusian campaign; Khmelnytsky Uprising, Tsar Alexei's campaign; Polish–Russian War (1654–1667)
Date	June – 13 August 1654
Location	Gomel, Minsk Voivodeship, Polish–Lithuanian Commonwealth (present-day Gomel Oblast, Belarus)
Result	Cossack victory

Belligerents
Cossack Hetmanate	Polish-Lithuanian Commonwealth

Commanders and leaders
Ivan Zolotarenko; Stepan Pobodailo †	Stanisław Kazimierz Bobrownicki (surrendered)

Strength
20,000	2,000

Casualties and losses
Unknown	Entire garrison surrendered

The Siege of Gomel was conducted by the Zaporozhian Cossacks of Ivan Zolotarenko against the Polish–Lithuanian garrison of Stanisław Kazimierz Bobrownicki, which took place from June to 13 August 1654. The siege was part of the broader Belarusian campaign led by Hetman Ivan Zolotarenko.

== Prelude ==
The Gomel fortress went through several sieges during the Khmelnytsky Uprising. In 1648, it was captured and looted by the Belarusian peasants and Cossacks of colonel Glovasky. In 1649, it was again captured by Cossacks, this time under the command of colonel Nebaba, but Cossacks didn't establish permeant presence in Gomel. In 1651, however, the Cossacks led by colonels Nebaba and Zabella were repelled from the fortress.

In 1653, the Gomel fortress was reinforced with additional forces. In 1654, the fortress garrison reportedly consisted of 2,000 troops, which included German and Hungarian mercenaries, as well as a Tatar company. During this time, Ivan Zolotarenko's army reached in peak strength (20,000 Cossacks in cavalry and foot units), which were also armed with cannons intended for the siege.

== Siege ==
The residents of Gomel and surrounding settlements held a pro-Cossack sentiment. Thanks to the support of local population, the Cossacks were able to isolate the fortress and block any potential Polish–Lithuanian reinforcements from arriving. Before the Cossacks begun their siege, Ivan Zolotarenko wrote to Tsar Alexei Mikhailovich that "Gomel is the head of all Lithuanian borderlands. It's a very defensible place, there are many men serving [there], and there's plenty of ammunition and gunpowder". However, Zolotarenko's Cossacks overrun the fortifications without much difficulty and approached the city's castle. They began the siege of the castle and shelled it with cannons. Until 11 July, Cossack assaults on the castle were unsuccessful. The garrison carried out sorties, during one of which colonel Stepan Pobodailo was killed. As a result, the Cossacks decided to starve out the garrison instead.

As the siege dragged on, the garrison refused to surrender, despite constant orders of Zolotarenko to submit. After all of his requests were ignored, he ordered his Cossacks to place their cannons on the church tower and fire at the castle from there. The castle was caught on fire and further counterattacks of the besieged garrison were repelled. The Cossacks also blew up a secret passage out of the castle and eventually forced the garrison to surrender.

== Aftermath ==
On 13 August, 1654, Ivan Zolotarenko wrote to the Tsar Alexei Mikhailovich that "the Gomel residents, colonels, captains, and all their men submitted". The control over Gomel consolidated Cossack influence in the southwest Belarus. The Cossacks of Zolotarenko also achieved notable successes in other places, allowing them to occupy sizeable portion of southwest Belarus. However, Zolotarenko refused to take part in military operations directed by the Russian army, as he also placed the territory his Cossacks occupied under the control of Cossack Hetmanate rather than Tsardom of Russia.
