= Ivan Zolotarenko =

Ukrainian Cossack leader (died 1655)

- Іван Золотаренко
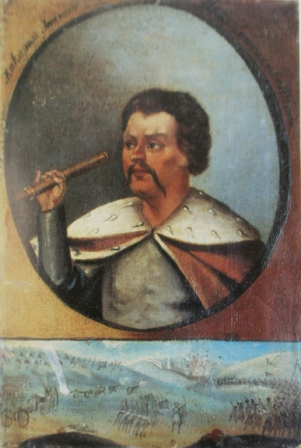
- 18th century depiction of Ivan Zolotarenko
- Born: Unknown; Korsun, Kiev Voivodeship, Polish–Lithuanian Commonwealth
- Died: 17 October 1655; Bykhaw, Vitebsk Voivodeship, Polish–Lithuanian Commonwealth
- Military career
- Allegiance: Cossack Hetmanate (1652–1655); Tsardom of Russia (1654–1655)
- Service years: 1652–1655
- Rank: Acting hetman
- Nickname: Werewolf
- Commands: Nizhyn Regiment
- Conflicts: See list: Thirty Years' War; Siege of Dunkirk (1646) (?); Khmelnytsky Uprising; Battle of Batih; Russo-Polish War (1654–1667); Tsar Alexei's campaign; Siege of Smolensk (1654); Zolotorenko's Belarusian campaign; Siege of Gomel; Battle of Vilnius (1655); Siege of Stary Bykhaw (1654–1655) (DOW)

Ivan Nikiforovich Zolotarenko (Ukrainian: Іван Никифорович Золотаренко; Russian: Иван Никифорович Золотаренко; Belarusian: Іван Нічыпаравіч Залатарэнка; Polish: Iwan Mykyforowycz Zołotarenko; Lithuanian: Ivanas Nikiforovičius Zolotarenko; died 1655) was a Zaporozhian Cossack acting hetman of Belarus and polkovnyk (colonel) of the Nizhyn Regiment. A close associate and brother-in-law of Bohdan Khmelnytsky, he fought against the Polish–Lithuanian Commonwealth and supported alliance with Tsardom of Russia during the Pereiaslav Rada in 1654.

== Origin ==
Zolotarenko's date of birth is unknown, but he is believed to have come from an Orthodox Ruthenian Cossack noble family with origins in Korsun-Shevchenkivskyi (present-day Cherkasy Oblast, Ukraine) and was a close associate of Bohdan Khmelnytsky. He was a brother-in-law to Bohdan Khmelnytsky due to Khmelnytsky's marriage to Hanna Zolotarenko.

== Career ==
In 1646, Zolotarenko potentially took part in the Siege of Dunkirk alongside Ivan Sirko during the Thirty Years' War. In August–November 1651, he was entrusted by Bohdan Khmelnytsky to go on diplomatic missions to the Tsardom of Russia. In 1652, he was appointed as the new polkovnyk (colonel) of Nizhyn Regiment and took part in the Battle of Batih.

In 1654, he led 15,000–20,000 Cossacks in alliance with the Russian army during his successful campaign into Belarus and parts of Lithuania. He also assisted the Russian army in recapture of Smolensk during the Tsar Alexei's campaign. Zolotarenko's Cossacks and his Russian allies captured Minsk and Vilnius during the campaign.

Zolotarenko and his Cossacks established their administration in the occupied southern parts of Belarus, which also led to dispute with Russian authorities over control of these lands. Zolotarenko promoted cossackization of the Belarusian lands he governed and managed to assert his authority in disputes with the Russian officials. Tsar Alexei Mikhailovich granted Zolotarenko the right to own Baturyn and Hlukhiv for his exploits in the Belarusian campaign.

== Death and burial ==
In 1655, Zolotarenko was wounded in the leg from a musket gun fire during the Siege of Polish-controlled Stary Bykhaw, which led to his death. He was buried in Korsun at the end of December.

== Legacy ==
=== Belarusian history ===
The first written use of the term "Belarus" was recorded in a letter of Ivan Zolotarenko to the Tsar Alexei Mikhailovich on 29 September 1654.

=== Atrocities ===
Ivan Zolotarenko was nicknamed a werewolf for his brutality during the conquest. The Zaporozhian Cossacks of Nizhyn Regiment under the command of Ivan Zolotarenko gained a vile reputation as marauders and butchers of the Polish–Lithuanian and Jewish populations in the territories they conquered. According to an eyewitness, Zolotarenko's Cossacks "tortured the villagers, killed them to death, took all their property, and set fire to other villages".

On September 1654, Zolotarenko’s Cossacks massacred thousands of Polish civilians in the Pripet Marshes. The most infamous example of his atrocities was the plunder of Vilnius in 1655, after its fall to the Russo–Cossack troops and subsequent massacre of up to 25,000 civilians. Zolotarenko's Cossacks burnt the Jewish quarter and massacred many Jews in process. Russian officer M.P. Voeikov in his letter to Moscow stated "I cannot serve alongside Zolotarenko here, I fear him more than the Poles".

=== Legends ===
Ivan Zolotarenko was believed to have possessed magical powers associated with Kharakternyks (Cossack Sorcerers) during his life. According to a legend, Zolotarenko died after being pierced by a silver bullet, as a regular bullet couldn't kill a Sorcerer. The legend also holds that during his funeral a church was caught on fire. This was later used by the Catholic propaganda as evidence of "God's punishment" for Zolotarenko's crimes against Poles, Lithuanians and Jews.

== Commemoration ==
In present-day Ukrainian cities of Korsun-Shevchenkivskyi, Chernihiv and Chyhyryn streets were named after Ivan Zolotarenko. On 23 November 2018, in the Ukrainian city of Nizhyn on the Nizhyn Wall of Heroes a memorial plaque was erected in honor of Ivan Zolotarenko.
