= Starodub Regiment =

Starodub Regiment Стародубський полк (Ukrainian)
- Regiment of Cossack Hetmanate
- 1663–1782
- Coat of arms

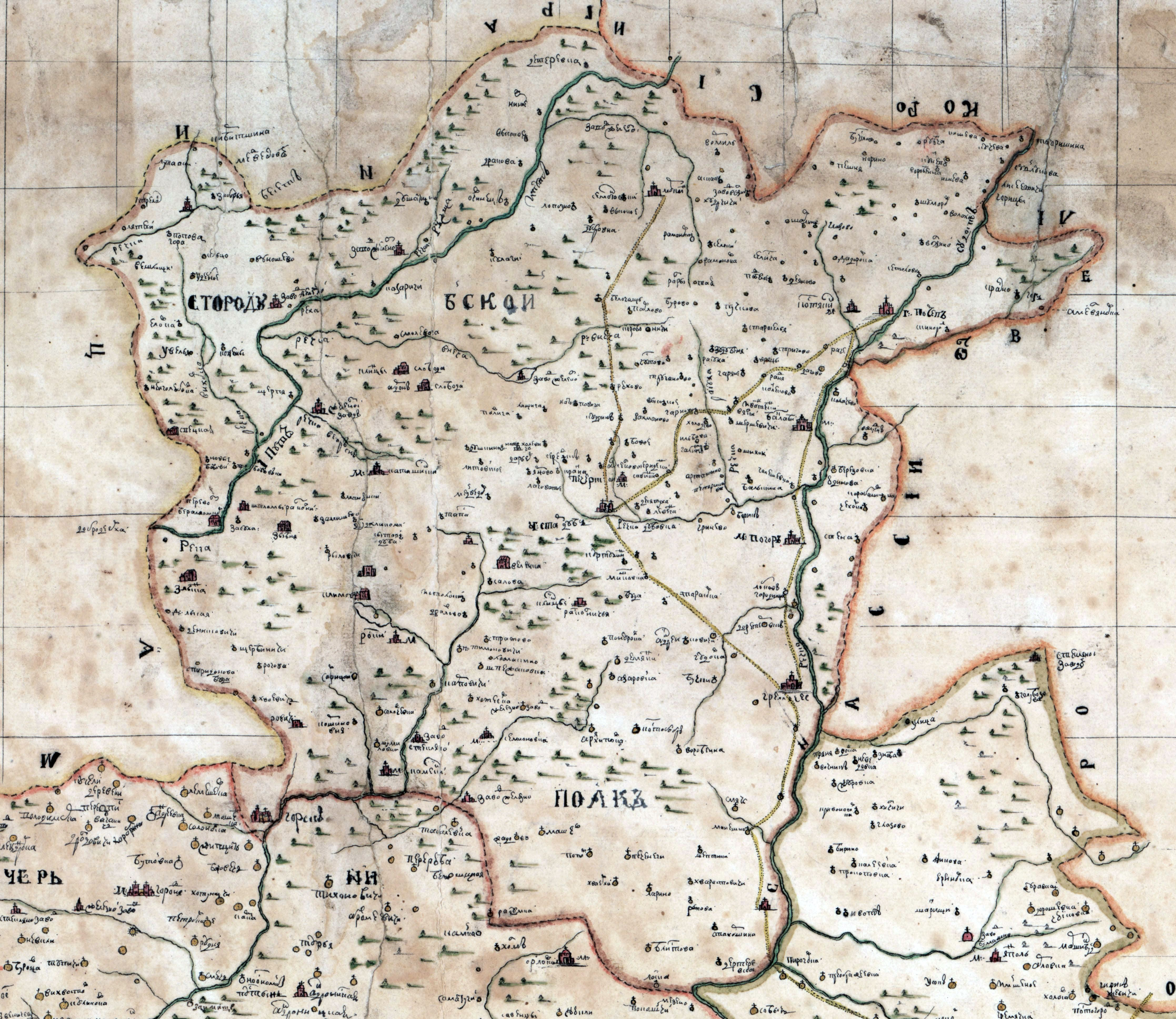
- 18th century map of Starodub Regiment
- Capital: Starodub
- History
  - Established: 1663
  - Disestablished: 1782
Preceded by	Succeeded by
Nizhyn Regiment	Novgorod-Seversky Viceroyalty
- Today part of: Russia

Starodub Regiment (Ukrainian: Стародубський полк, Russian: Стародубский полк) was an administrative unit of the Cossack Hetmanate centered in Starodub and encompassing the northernmost part of Left-bank Ukraine. Its former territory currently belongs to Bryansk Oblast of Russia.

== History ==
Starodub became a regimental town of the Cossack Hetmanate in 1648. Between 1654 and 1663 the regiment's territory was subordinate to Nizhyn Regiment, after which it became a separate administrative unit. In different periods it consisted of 7 to 11 sotnias.

In 1669, under the influence of archbishop Lazar Baranovych, Cossack starshyna of Starodub Regiment supported the candidacy of Demian Mnohohrishny as "hetman of Siveria" along with their counterparts from Chernihiv and Novhorod-Siverskyi Regiments. During the Great Northern War the regiment's territory was devastated by troops of the Tsardom of Russia.

In the 18th century it was one of 10 Cossack regiments into which the Hetmanate was administratively divided. During the middle and latter part of the 18th century the regiment was engulfed by peasant revolts directed against enserfment of the local population. In 1782 the regiment's territory was incorporated into Novgorod-Seversky Viceroyalty.

== Notable leaders ==
- Ivan Skoropadsky (1646–1722), colonel of Starodub, who was appointed Hetman of the Zaporozhian Host following the defection of Ivan Mazepa

== Gallery ==
Variant coat of arms

Coat of arms of Starodub Land

Seal of Starodub colonel M. Miklashevsky, 1694
