= Novy Bykhaw =

Agrotown in Mogilev Region, Belarus

Novy Bykhaw Новы Быхаў (Belarusian)
- Agrotown
- Location within Belarus
- Coordinates: 53°20′07″N 30°21′06″E
- Country: Belarus
- Region: Mogilev Region
- District: Bykhaw District

Population (2019)
  - Total: 500
- Time zone: UTC+3 (MSK)
- Postal code: 213348
- Area code: +375 2231

Novy Bykhaw (Belarusian: Новы Быхаў; Russian: Новый Быхов, romanized: Novy Bykhov; Polish: Nowy Bychów; lit. 'New Bykhaw') is an agrotown in Bykhaw District, Mogilev Region, Belarus. It serves as the administrative center of Novy Bykhaw rural council (selsoviet). As of 2019, it has a population of 500.

== History ==
Archaeological finds by Novy Bykhov indicate the presence of the Zarubintsy culture dated by mid-3rd century BCE. In 1905 archeologist Evdokim Romanov excavated four burial places by Novy Bykhaw. Further excavations in the area followed, but were interrupted due to the revolutionary and military turmoil of the time and resumed only in 1925–1926 and interrupted again until early 1960s. The finds in burials dated from the 6th–10th centuries suggest that the area was a contact area of the Drehovichs and Radimichs.

In the 16th century the miasteczko of Nowy Bychów was part of the Kingdom of Poland, in property of Chodkiewicz family, later of Sapiehas. In the end of the 18th century, it was established as a magnate town in Bychów hrabstwo, Orsha powiat, Vitebsk Voivodeship. Geographical Dictionary of the Kingdom of Poland reports that in the late 19th century it had 281 households, of which 200 were of Christian Orthodox faith (1349 persons) and 81 were Jewish (664 persons).

=== Jewish history ===
The Brockhaus and Efron Jewish Encyclopedia stated that by the revision of 1847, the Jewish population of Nowy Bykhaw numbered 560. According to the 1897 Russian Census Novy Bykhaw had the highest percentage of Jewish population (490 Jews of 2255 total) in Bykhov uyezd, with the exception of Bykhov itself.

The Jewish population of Nywy Bykhaw (and in other places of Belarus) was annihilated during the Holocaust.

The place was known as Naybikhov by the Jewish population, as evidenced by the essay "The Road to Naybikhov" by Hillel Halkin published in the Commentary magazine, and in his book collection of essays.
