= Siege of Smolensk (1654) =

1654 event

- Part of the Russo-Polish War (1654–1667) and Tsar Alexei's campaign of 1654–1655
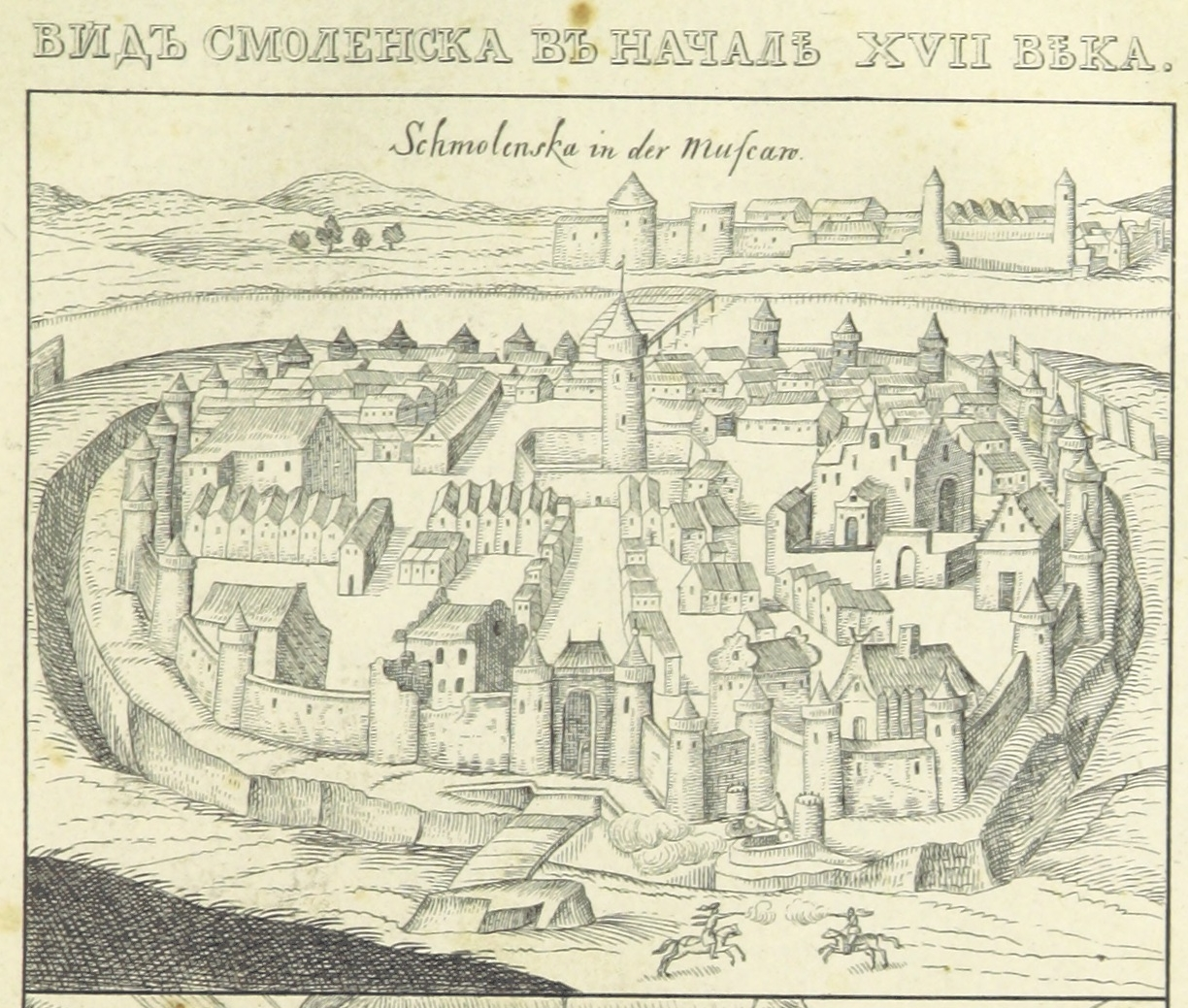
- Map of Smolensk in the 17th century
Date	6 July – 16 September 1654
Location	Smolensk 54°47′N 32°03′E
Result	Russo-Cossack victory

Belligerents
Polish–Lithuanian Commonwealth	Tsardom of Russia; Cossack Hetmanate

Commanders and leaders
Filip Obuchowicz (POW)	(Tsardom of Russia) Alexander Leslie (Tsardom of Russia) Yury Baryatinsky; Ivan Zolotarenko

Casualties and losses
Unknown	300 killed 1,000 wounded

The siege of Smolensk was one of the first great events of the Russo-Polish War (1654–67). Smolensk, which had been under the rule of the Polish–Lithuanian Commonwealth during 1404–1514 and since 1611, was besieged by a Russian-Cossack army in June 1654. The Polish garrison of the city (commanded by Smolensk Voivode Filip Obuchowicz) hoped to get reinforcements from the army of Janusz Radziwiłł (1612–1655), stationed in Orsha. Its situation worsened when Radziwiłł suffered a defeat from Prince Yakov Cherkassky in the Battle of Shklow. In September, the Polish garrison agreed to leave the city after it was promised a free retreat. The garrison left Smolensk and handed over its weapons and ensigns to the Russians before retreating to the Commonwealth-controlled territory. A significant number of landowners, however, preferred to stay and keep their estates, becoming subjects of the Russian Tsardom.
