= Stuartfield =

Village in Aberdeenshire, Scotland

Coordinates: 57.502°N 2.045°W

Stuartfield: Scottish Gaelic: Creachann; Scots: Crichie
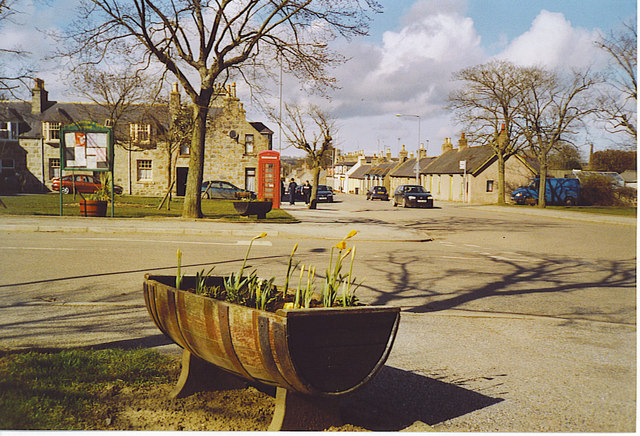
- The Square, Stuartfield

- Location within Aberdeenshire
- Population: 870 (2020)
- OS grid reference: NJ973459
- Council area: Aberdeenshire
- Lieutenancy area: Aberdeenshire
- Country: Scotland
- Sovereign state: United Kingdom
- Post town: PETERHEAD
- Postcode district: AB42
- Dialling code: 01771 (Mintlaw)
- Police: Scotland
- Fire: Scottish
- Ambulance: Scottish
- UK Parliament: Gordon and Buchan
- Scottish Parliament: Aberdeenshire East

Stuartfield is a small inland village in the Buchan area of Aberdeenshire, Scotland, situated 1.8 kilometres (1.1 mi) south of Old Deer. The village was originally known as New Crichie, with the name Crichie still used locally. The name Crichie derives from the Gaelic word for clay. The village was founded in the late 18th century by John Burnett, Laird of Crichie, who named it in honour of his grandfather, Captain John Stuart, who had purchased the estate around 1700.

== Sources ==
- Stuartfield in the Gazetteer for Scotland.
- Historical overview of Stuartfield in the Gazetteer for Scotland.
