= Tsar Alexei's campaign of 1654–1655 =

The Russian campaign against the Polish-Lithuanian Commonwealth

- Part of Northern War of 1655–1660 and Russo-Polish War (1654–1667)
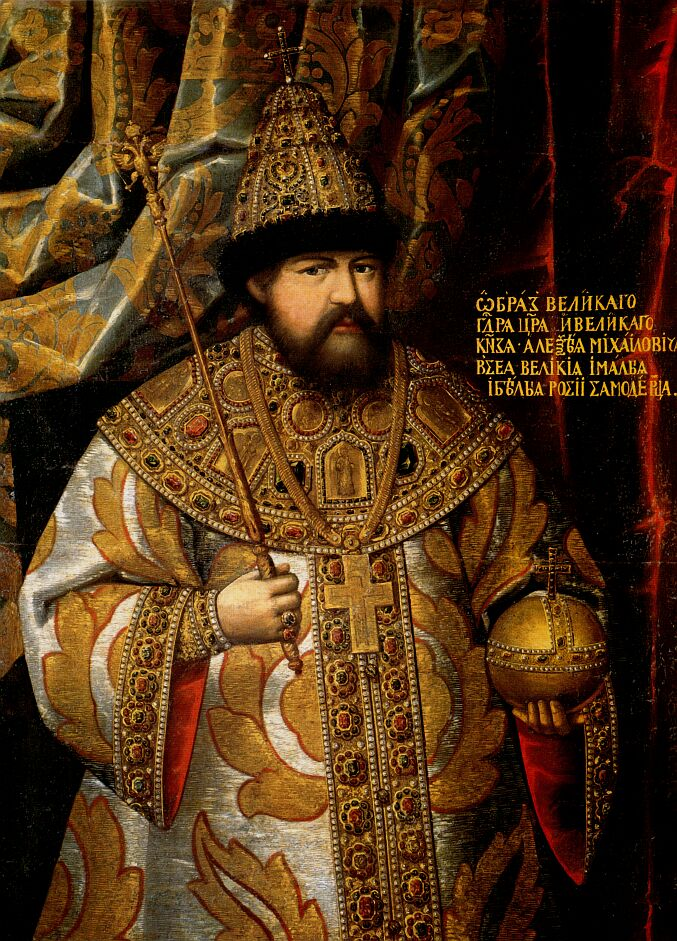
- Portrait of Alexis by an unknown Russian artist, c. 1670 – c. 1680
Date	May 1654 – November 1655
Location	Polish-Lithuanian Commonwealth, Smolensk, Belarus, Ukraine, Lithuania
Result	Russian–led victory
Territorial changes	Tsardom of Russia captures most of Lithuanian territory and all of Ukraine up to the San River: Cossack Hetmanate establishes its administration in Belarus

Belligerents
Tsardom of Russia; Cossack Hetmanate	Polish–Lithuanian Commonwealth; Crimean Khanate

Commanders and leaders
Alexis of Russia; Aleksey Trubetskoy; Ivan Khovanaky; Yakov Cherkassky; Yuri Baryatinsky; Vasily Sheremetev; Vasiliy Buturlin; Bohdan Khmelnytsky; Ivan Zolotarenko (DOW); Ivan Bohun; Ivan Sirko	John Casimir; Janusz Radziwiłł (WIA); Stefan Czarniecki; Stanisław Lanckoroński; Wincenty Korwin Gosiewski; Stanisław "Rewera" Potocki; Filip Obuchowicz (POW); Mehmed IV Giray

Strength
c. 90,000	c. 11,000 in Lithuania

Tsar's Campaign of 1654–1655 also known as Tsar Alexei's campaign of 1654–1655 was a campaign of the Muscovite army against the Polish-Lithuanian Commonwealth as part of the Russo-Polish "Thirteen Years" War. Army of the Tsardom of Russia fought with the army of the Polish-Lithuanian Commonwealth (mainly Lithuanian) on a vast territory during the so-called "deluge". As a result, the Muscovites were able to return and seize significant lands, including the capital of Lithuania, Vilnius.

In May 1654, the Russian army entered the territory of the Commonwealth, concentrating on capturing Smolensk. After a long siege, the city fell in October 1654. A further Russian offensive included the seizure of other strongholds in the Grand Duchy of Lithuania, including Vitebsk, Polotsk and Mogilev. Fighting took place both in the form of sieges and field battles against the troops of Lithuanian Grand Hetman Janusz Radziwiłł. In 1655, the campaign intensified, with the Russian army, supported by Cossacks, taking Minsk, Grodno and Vilnius, which was looted and burned. In Ukraine, the Tsar's army interacted with Cossack troops, waging hostilities against the Crown and Lithuanian armies. The Russians took control of Kyiv and their offensive expanded westwards. The military situation was complicated by the Swedish invasion of the Polish-Lithuanian Commonwealth in 1655, which drew back some of the Polish-Lithuanian forces and allowed the Tsarist army to continue its march. The warfare involved numerous sieges, the destruction of cities.

== Genesis ==
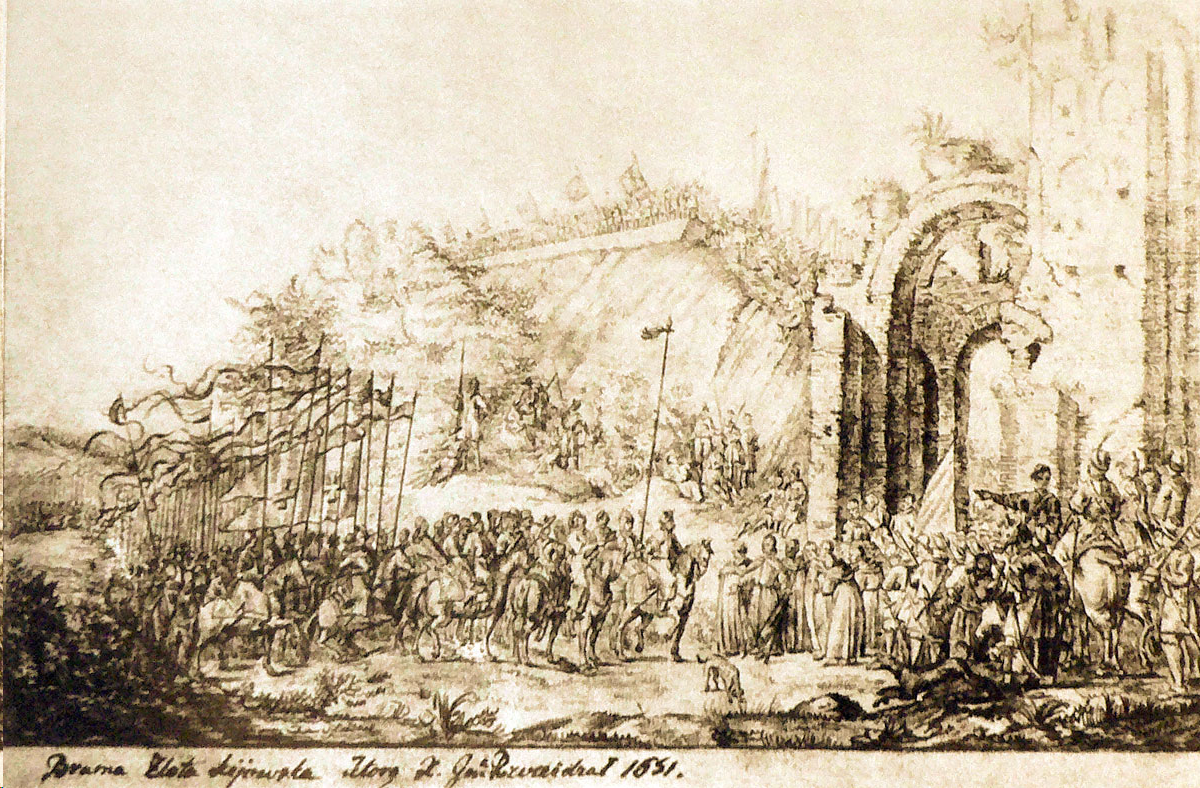
The solemn entry of Janusz Radziwiłł Lithuanian army into Kiev, 1651 by Abraham Van Westerfeld

In 1648, the Khmelnytsky uprising broke out in the Polish-Lithuanian Commonwealth. It quickly spread across the whole of Ukraine. At that time, the Crown forces suffered a number of defeats, including at Zhovti Vody, followed by Korsun. This revealed the deep crisis facing the Commonwealth. In the following year, 1649, two battles were fought at Zboriv and Zbarazh, at which time the Polish side was forced to sign an unfavourable treaty. (Note: Despite their alliance with the Cossacks, the Tartars allowed the Crown troops out of the siege without their consent. For the Tatars, the annihilation of the entire Polish army was not an option. It would have seriously upset the balance of power.) In 1650, these defeats gave the Tsar's court various reasons to put forward various demands from the Polish-Lithuanian side which were not accepted. Khmelnitsky got into a state of "dizziness from success," sending delegations to Moscow not to accept citizenship, but rather to put pressure on Warsaw. A year later, the situation had changed dramatically and the Cossack forces were completely defeated in Battle of Berestechko. This defeat, subsequent looting of Kiev and the humiliating treaty of Bila Tserkva had a strong impact on Khmelnitsky's personality and his goals. Now his task was to show Alexis the determination of the Cossacks to become part of the Russia.

In 1652, hostilities resumed again where, however, the Cossacks annihilated the Polish forces at the battle of Batih. The following year, fighting continued alternately until the siege of Zhvanets. The biggest winner was not either side, but the Tatars, who, at the cost of betraying the Cossacks, made a deal with John Casimir. (Note: The Tatars again, as at Zbarazh, betrayed the Cossacks and signed a settlement with the Poles) The Cossack Hetman knew that, having such an untrustworthy ally, he could not count on him. After the battle itself, the Russian land council granted permission for the Cossacks to be incorporated into Russia. Tsar himself doubted this for a long time, especially after Berestechko, but by February 1653 he had made a decision. On March 19, a decree was issued on the beginning of mobilization in Russia. On the basis of the Pereiaslav Agreement, the entire sicha was incorporated into Russia. At the Sejm in Warsaw, news of Khmelnytsky's deed was learned, but the deputies did not take quick steps to prepare for war. On the contrary, the Sejm was broken up and the country had no funds for defence. This was a huge logjam that was to be revealed to the Lithuanians later. At that time, the tsarist forces were already concentrating for the offensive.

== Invasion of the Grand Duchy of Lithuania: 1654 ==
=== Army sizes ===
Russian forces were clearly significant, some Lithuanian Narrative sources speak of 200,000, which is disputed by modern science. Working with the documents of the Moscow Razryadny Prikaz provides the following information about the number of Russian military formations, some documents were lost, so it is impossible to determine the absolute size of the army, however, almost complete information about the composition of the army units has been established:

Russian army	Central Army	Northwestern Army	Southwestern Army	Cossack Corps	Pskov regiment
Generals	Tsar Alexis	Vasiliy Sheremetev	Aleksey Trubetskoy	Ivan Zolotarenko	Lev Saltykov
Numbers	c. 41,000	13,146	c. 18,000	c. 20,000	1,147

According to modern estimates, c. 11,000 soldiers engaged in Lithuania in the initial period in order to counteract the Russians.

=== Summer campaign of 1654 and Russian advances and the Lithuanian-Moscow struggle ===
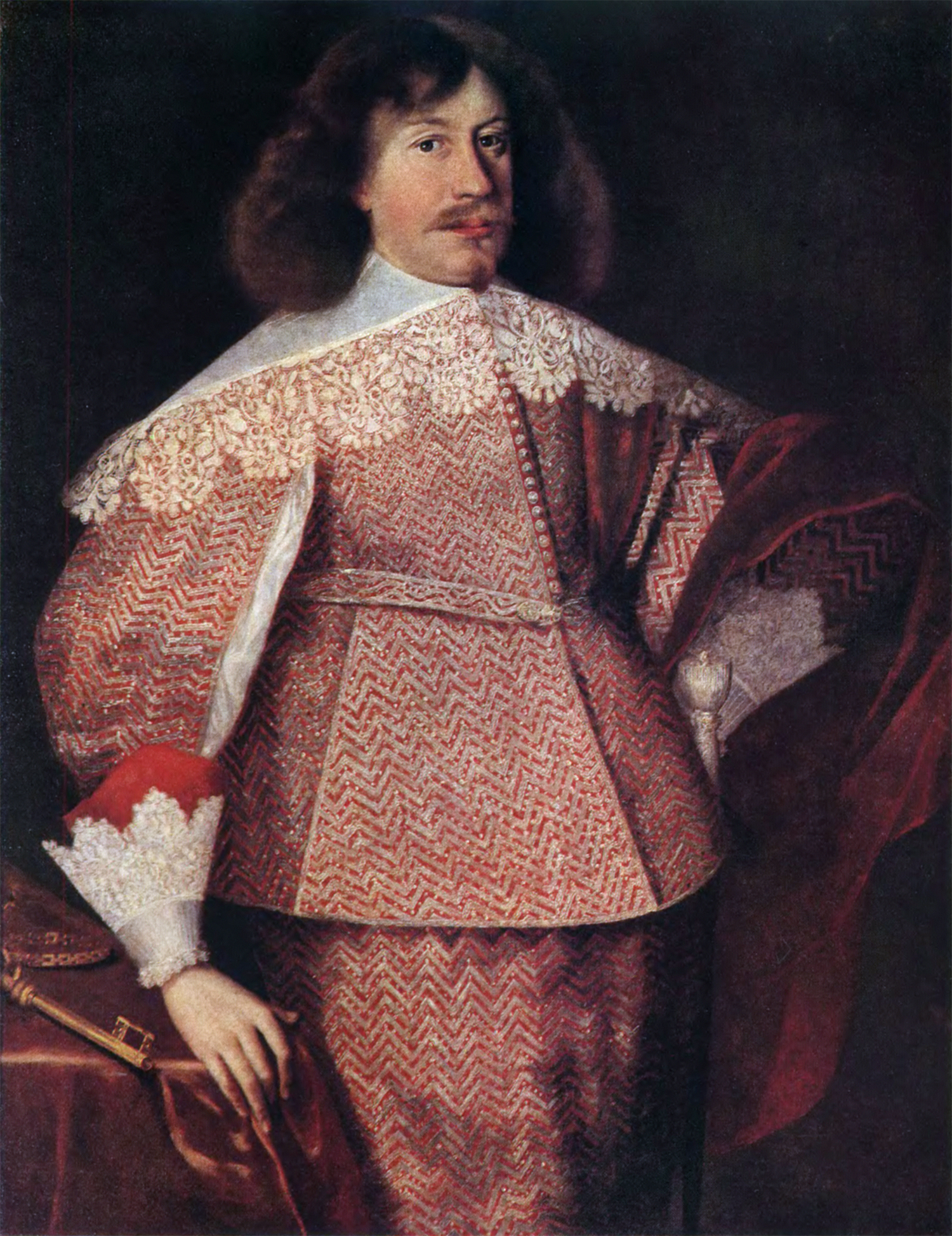
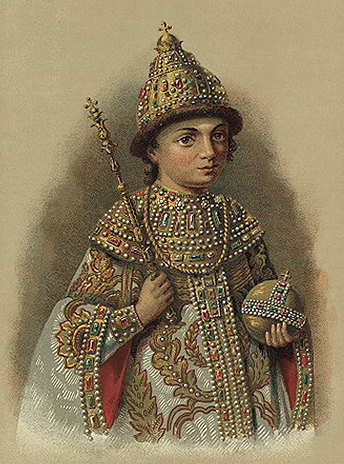
Prince Radziwiłł (left) and Aleksey Trubetskoy (right)

In May and June 1654, Russian forces invaded the territory of the Grand Duchy of Lithuania. The aim of the campaign was to capture the vast lands of Lithuania. The Moscow offensive quickly surprised the unprepared fortresses and Lithuanian army. The first fortress to capitulate after a three-day siege was Polotsk. The fall of such a large fortress caused shock in Lithuania. Later fortresses fell one after another. On 22 July, the Tsar's army captured Roslavl. Also Dorogobuzh in central Belarus fell. Then Cossack forces under the command of Ivan Zlotarenko attempted to capture Gomel; after a fierce defence of the fort, the Lithuanian garrison finally surrendered it to Zlotarenko.

News of the Russian invasion reached the Sejm as early as 9 June. Initially, the problem of the Russian invasion was downplayed, but the news of the large advances of the Moscow army energised the szlachta, who passed high taxes. This money, due to the underdeveloped financial apparatus, was to arrive a year later. This put the Lithuanians in the unfortunate position of being deprived of any assistance from the Crown army. Meanwhile, in Rzeczpospolita things were going very badly in the country, and a magnate coalition headed by the Lithuanian field hetman Janusz Radziwiłł was forming against John Casimir. It came to the point where Janusz Radziwiłł summoned Prince George II of Rákóczi, Duke Rákóczi, to try to take the Polish throne by force of arms. The Radziwiłłs were supported by the Lubomirski and Opaliński families.

There was also a mobilisation of Lithuanian forces, They attacked the Russians in the Battle of Nowa Woda. Here a Lithuanian detachment of 2,000 defeated a Russian force of 6,000, who retreated after losing 300 men. The battle had no effect on the course of the campaign. Trubetsky also captured Mstislav at this time, After this he carried out the so-called Trubetsky's massacre. Janusz Radziwiłł, who eventually became commander of the Lithuanian forces, decided to fight a battle with Yakov Cherkassky. Yakov was leading an army of 20,000 with him, but engaged only 12,000. Radziwiłł blocked his way on the river near Shklow with 8,000, where he decided to defend the crossing against his superior forces. A final charge by Lithuanian cavalry paralysed the Muscovites. It forced them into a panicky retreat. According to Lithuanian estimates, muscovites casualties were 7,000, and according to Konrad Bobiatyński calculations, 3,500. Such data is not reflected in Russian documents, for example, the regiments of the central position lost 9 killed and 17 wounded during the battle, which indicates small losses in the battle, they probably amounted to several hundred. Battle ended with Lithuanian tactical victory or indecisive, according to the latest Russian research. This action was bought with heavy losses however for Lithuanians. This was followed by another clash, this time at Shepeleviche. Trubetsky, surprising the Lithuanians, hit them with twice as many men. The defeat of the Lithuanians was total. The Lithuanians lost from 1,000 to 3,000 killed and several hundred more prisoners. In addition, the Lithuanian forces lost their fighting capacity for several weeks.

=== Smolensk collapse and Lithuanian forces disaster ===
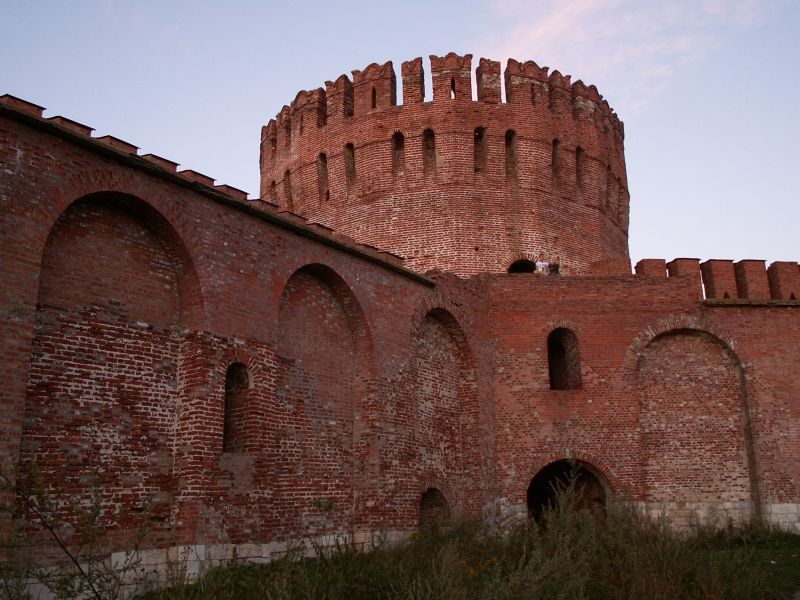
Preserved fragments of Smolensk fortifications

After the Smolensk War, the walls of the Smolensk fortress were not properly cared for and were in a terrible state. In 1653 Filip Kazimierz Obuchowicz was nominated as the commander of the Smolensk fortress. There were also a lot of absurdities at the time, including attempts to keep Obuchowicz out of the city. A huge force of 3,500 men was assembled to defend the fortress. Tsar Alexis arrived at Smolensk with his main forces on 6 July 1654. He began a regular siege. The first major fighting took place on 26 August, when the Russians launched a huge assault on the Smolensk walls. However, due to a lack of coordination, the Tsar's forces were eventually repulsed. This saved the city crew from complete defeat, for the Lithuanians in whom defeatism had set in. It was then that the news of the defeat at Shepeleviche shook the morale of the garrison. This contributed to the surrender of Lithuanian forces. Those in charge of the defence of Smolensk, such as Jan Miładowski, revealed the problems faced by the crew. The defenders agreed to Moscow's conditions. This is how Smolensk fell into Russian hands.

The defeats suffered during the various battles put pressure on the Lithuanian command, rebuilding the army. The situation became more complicated after Bohdan Khmelnytsky launched an offensive in the south of Belarus. Meanwhile, fresh reinforcements from all over the country were reaching the Lithuanians. However, the good news was the arrival of the Crown army. The mood soon changed again, in view of the dispatch of the Crown army to Ukraine. Radziwiłł now had to rely on infantry and dragoons. In the autumn and before, the Lithuanian Sejm appointed Pospolite ruszenie. Often the nobles who turned up for the summons immediately left the Lithuanian camp due to lack of pay, these factors and others meant that the Lithuanian army assembled only 2,000 men. Even Paweł Sapiecha himself came to join Radziwiłł's army. Volunteer units were formed which, instead of supporting the Lithuanian army, plundered their own country. A total force of 15,000 was gathered near Minsk. The total mobilisation took a huge effort, as it was possible to field an army of as many as 18,000 in Lithuania.

=== Conflicts between Gosiewski and Radziwiłł ===
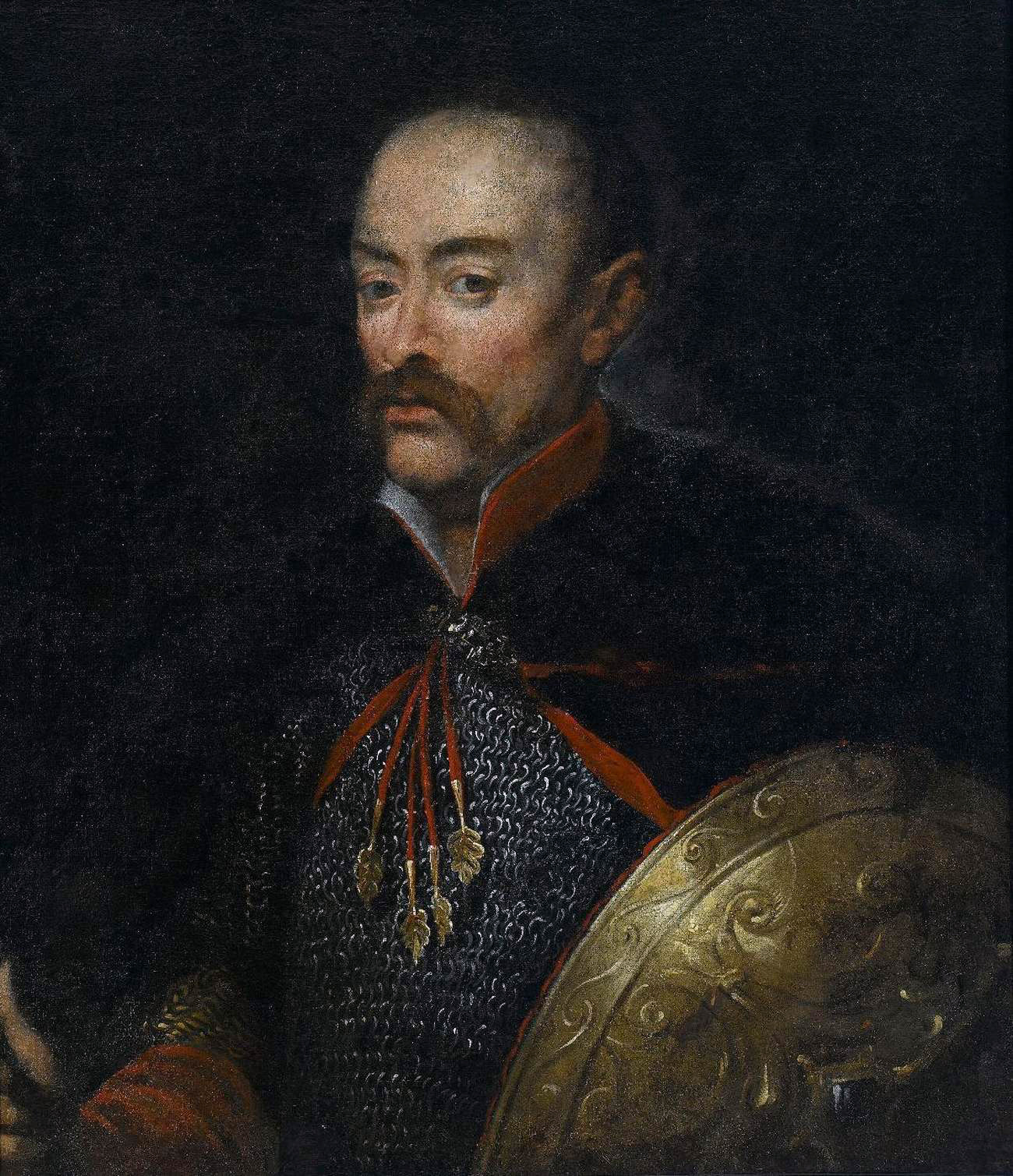
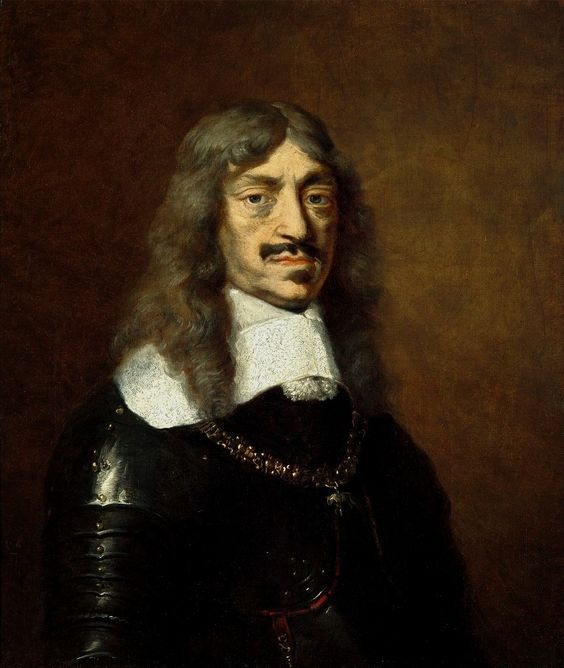
Wincenty Korwin Gosiewski (left) and John II Casimir Vasa (right)

In Lithuania, Wincenty Gosiewski was nominated as Lithuanian field hetman. This was a blow dealt by John Casimir to Hetman Janusz Radziwiłł. Lithuanian received the news strongly antagonistic, remaining in conflict with the king. The first conflicts in the dower had already occurred in Minsk. A bizarre situation occurred near Rakov, where the Lithuanian forces supporting Gosiewski did not want to submit to Radziwiłł, so they camped there. There were clashes and incidents involving loyalists of both hetmans. Another dispute was over the supremacy of the Crown army in Lithuania. Due to increasing tensions, John Casimir set off for Lithuania. In Grodno, he accused Radziwiłł of the defeats he had suffered. Radziwiłł immediately addressed all the issues in a manifesto. In the end, the interest of further war with Moscow tipped the scales, in favour of a temporary reconciliation between the hetmans. Radziwiłł countered with a comprehensive plan to fight the Moscow invaders. In this, he undertook very risky plans like trying to tear the Cossacks from the tsar's yoke. The Lithuanian deliberations also began, with Gosiewski and Radziwiłł alternately accusing each other, including even falsifying army statistics and money. In the end, the dispute was settled by the Minsk priest Zawisza. The final verdicts of the debates met with huge criticism from the nobility.

Following these disputes, hostilities against the Muscovites were also eventually resumed. This brought the Battle of Klitshev, in which the Cossack forces suffered defeat, losing as many as 500 men. And then at Ryniny, where the Cossacks again were defeated, with as many as 900 Cossacks killed. This was a prelude to the larger actions that were soon to follow. The sheer lack of great success resulted in low morale in the Lithuanian army. As defeatism grew among the Lithuanians. Sheremetev captured Vitebsk after 14 week siege. Contributing to this was the treachery of the townspeople who opened the gates to the Tsarist army and the procrastination of the Lithuanian army in providing relief, late arriving on 9 December. However, the occupied town was quickly recaptured thanks to an attack by the not uncommon Komorowski. Many were killed as well as captured at will. The siege of Stary Bykhaw also continued at this time. Zlotarenko, who had already been trying to capture the town for many months, could not break through the strong walls.

== Further fighting and final Russian victory: 1655 ==
=== Winter Offensive of Polish-Lithuanian forces ===
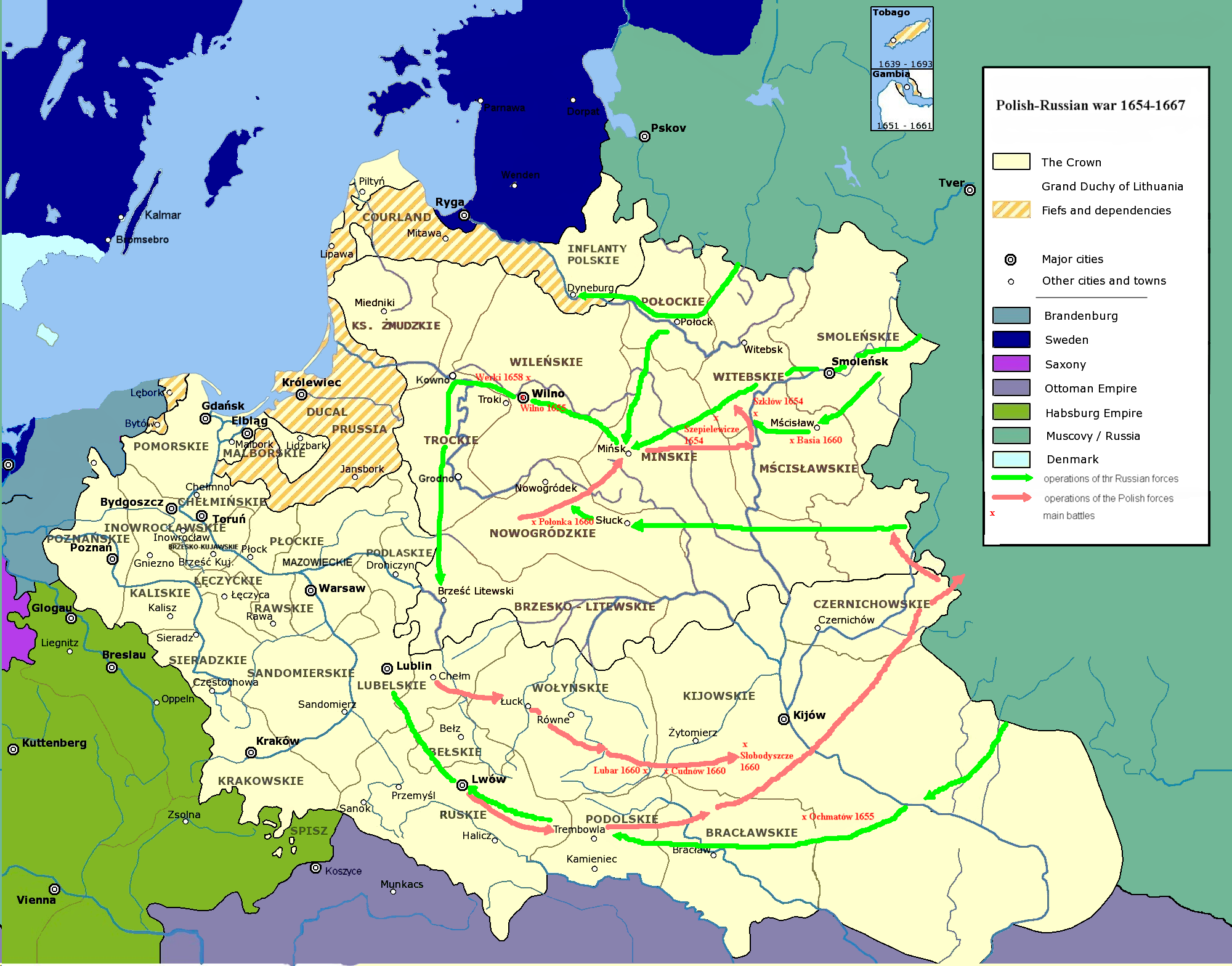
Map of battles fought during the entire Polish-Russian war

Initially, any plans for an offensive were met with various obstacles, in particular a lack of money. John Casimir again fuelled conflicts between Gosiewski and Radziwiłł. However, this dispute soon died down after the royal court declared that it would not introduce reforms, which led to tensions. Finally, in December 1654, Crown forces went on the offensive on the southern flank of the Polish-Lithuanian Commonwealth. This was joined by the Lithuanian army, which decided to take limited action. The plan was to recapture a number of fortresses that had been lost from the 1654 campaign. Radziwiłł's forces first took Holowczyn. Then they wanted to capture the very powerful fortress of Novi Bykhaw, which had a Cossack garrison of 5,000 to 12,000 Cossacks. The Lithuanian army that besieged the city numbered 12,000 to 14,000. Preparations for the first big attack were going mediocrely. Radziwiłł was ill and the Lithuanians had great difficulty with food supplies. On 24 January 1655, a huge assault was made on the fortress towers. However, a thunderstorm of problems prevented the capture of the city. Further assaults were then abandoned in favour of a simple siege. In Ukraine, the Crown forces fought a battle against the Cossack-Russian forces at Okhmativ. Both sides claim victory: Russian Russians retreated, which allowed the Poles to declare victory, but they forced the Poles to lift the siege of Okhmatov and Uman and abandon further offensive, this allowed the Russians to declare their victory. The stand-off and failure to inflict defeat on the Tsarist forces did not fill the soldiers and the Polish-Lithuanian command with optimism. Of the less important fortresses, Dobrovne and Kopyś were captured. Thus, the first phase ended in complete failure for the Lithuanians.

Lithuanian troops then advanced on Mogilev. It was a very powerful fortress, located on the Dnieper River itself. Before the Lithuanian siege, the fortress was powerfully fortified with various troops. Radziwiłł hoped that the townspeople would come over to his side and open the city gates for him. However, from the very beginning of the tsarist invasion, the townspeople sympathised with the Russians, united above all by their common faith and origin. This forced Radziwiłł to launch a general assault, which took place on 16 February. After heavy fighting, the Mogilev garrison was pushed back as far as the castle. News also came that the earlier siege of Stary Byhkaw had ended with the capture of the city, but the siege of the castle continued. As time went by, the problems of the defenders worsened, huge losses were sustained and food was in short supply. The good news for the garrison of the town was the relief of the town. However, it was crushed by the Lithuanians. Both sides were slowly demoralised by the siege. Therefore, negotiations with the garrison began, but to no avail. Due to the worsening situation of the Lithuanian army, Radziwiłł launched another general assault, during which suddenly part of the Lithuanian army tried to retreat from the battlefield. Radziwiłł did not manage to stop everyone from doing so. In the end, Mogilev was not captured.

=== Fighting of the remaining Lithuanian troops and Summer Campaign ===
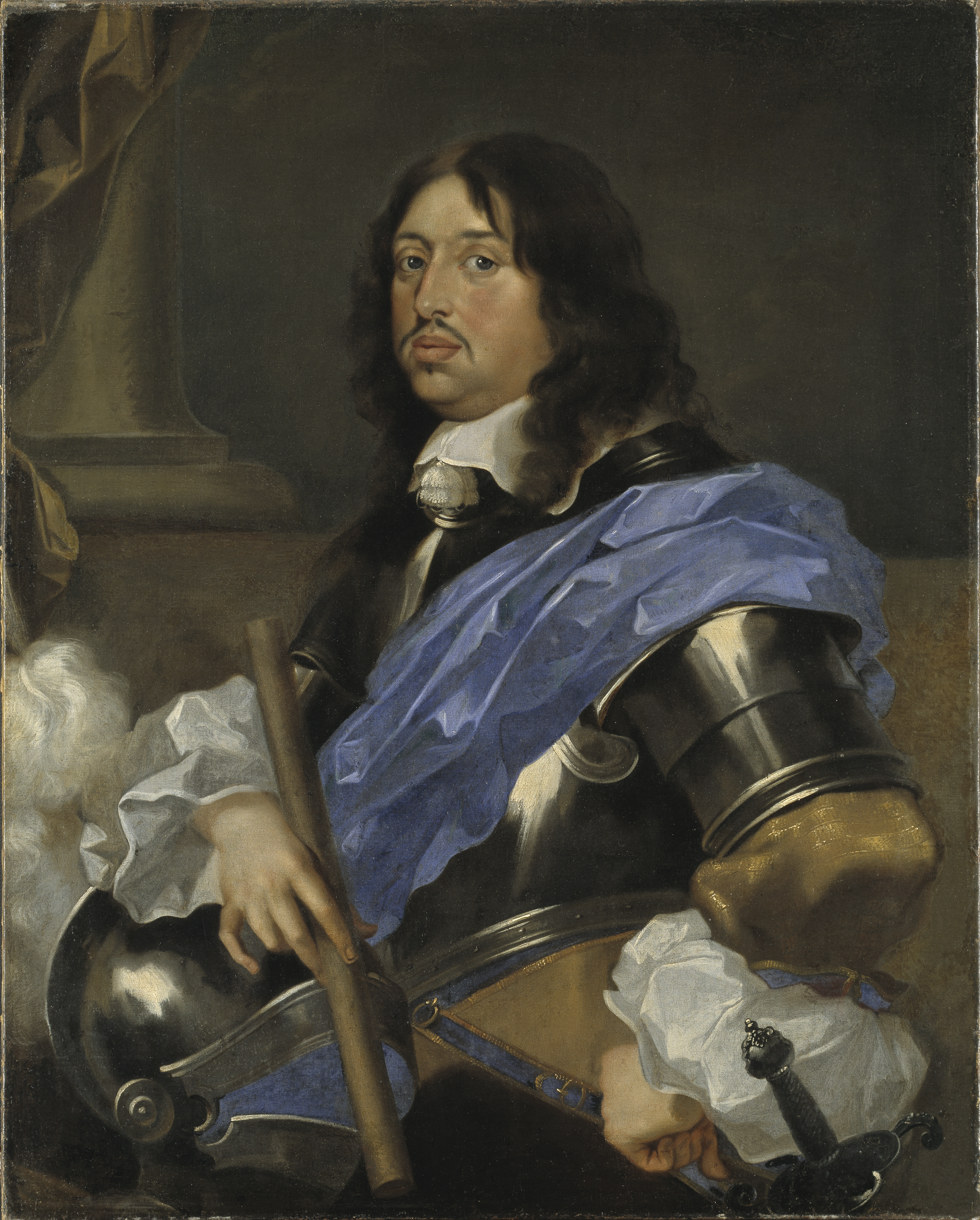
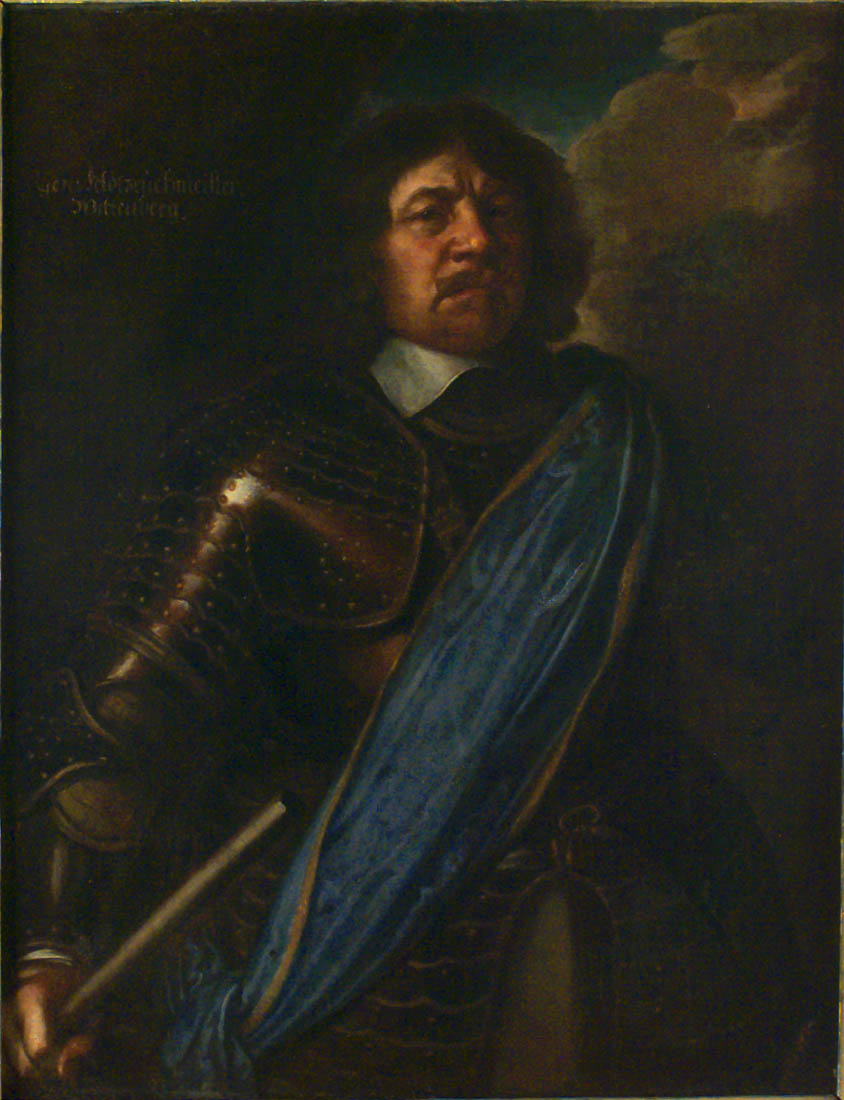
Charles X Gustav (left) and Arvid Wittenberg (right)

In the remaining areas, due to the fact that these were regions classified as secondary by the Lithuanian command, fighting was done by volunteers. Previous successes from the winter campaign meant that peasants began to join this group. More serious action was taken by these troops in January under Łukomski's command, where they began the blockade of Vitebsk. However, the blockade itself and the earlier assault did not yield any results. However, a huge expedition, by Vasyl Sheremetev, caused Łukomski's forces to disintegrate. The Lithuanian army made attempts to recapture the fortresses also in Polotsk, which was stormed without success. However, Jan Mężyski's troops were successful and took Ozieryszcz. The actions of the volunteers themselves, hardly brought any victories. In Livonia, small skirmishes were fought with the Russians. The situation was quite different in Courland itself, where the Muscovite forces were repulsed by Mikołaj Korff. There, the Tsar's forces, probably as large as those of the Lithuanians, unexpectedly launched a huge offensive on Daugavpils. After heavy fighting in Courland, the Russian plan to capture this city failed.

The situation in the prelude to the new Muscovite offensive was dire. There was a shortage of commanders, some of the forces simply left the Lithuanian camp or, due to shortages in the Lithuanian treasury, soldiers could not be paid. Disputes between Gosiewski and Radziwiłł intensified again. The Muscovite's forces, in the worst situation for the Lithuanian army, launched a summer offensive. Occupying a lot of the city and defeating the Lithuanians in various battles. However, the more important event was the Battle of Minsk, which opened the way for the Muscovites to take Vilnius. The triumphs were celebrated by Trubetsky himself and Sheremetev, who smashed the Lithuanian troops. The final blow that finally broke the morale of the Lithuanian army was the Swedish invasion. As a result, John Casimir was forced to recall part of the Crown forces from Lithuania to Poland. The situation itself, seemingly on the brink of the collapse of the Grand Duchy of Lithuania, forced Radziwiłł to hold secret talks with King Charles X Gustav. Eventually, the Swedish forces launched a massive offensive, which went evenly with the Russian forces. With no means to fight on two fronts, the Lithuanians offered the Tsar a truce, which he decided to reject and strike Vilnius in response. The Lithuanian forces, demoralised and zeroed in on decrees, were in no way able to defend Vilnius. During the Battle of Vilnius, the city fell to the Tsarist army. On 10 August, Tsar Alexei himself entered the capital. The Cossack Hetmanate established their administration in Belarus.

=== Autumn campaign ===
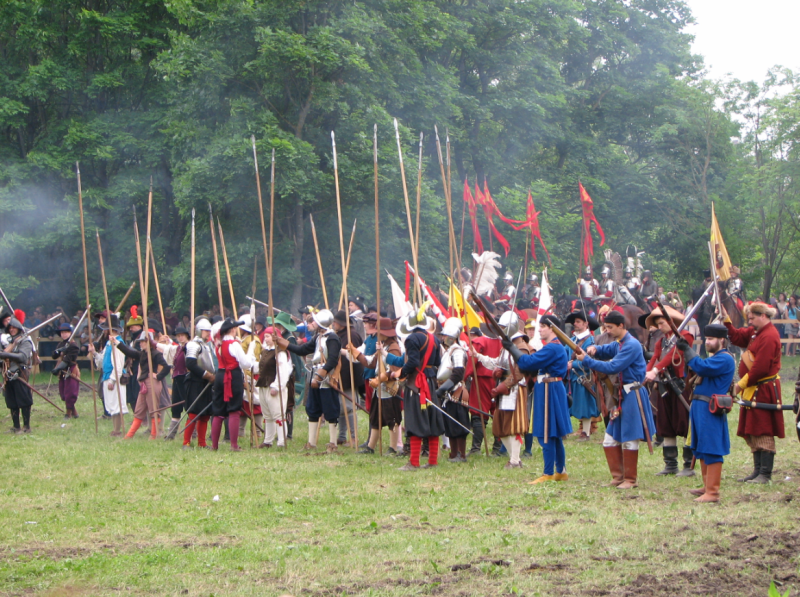
Lithuanian army "Goes out into the field", reconstruction

In September 1655, in order to consolidate the summer successes, the Russians launched a new offensive in Lithuania in the direction of Brest. The Russians, under the command of Semyon Urusov moved towards the city in a small detachment, not expecting serious resistance, but they were met with an unpleasant surprise: an 8,000 Lithuanian army gathered near Brest, which forced the Muscovites to retreat. Trying to build on their success, they surrounded the Russians, but in the subsequent battle of Verkhovichi they were defeated, losing 1,000 dead, 50 prisoners, several standards and guns. Although the Russians did not take Brest, a significant part of the Szlachta joined the service of the tsar after learning of such a triumph.

At the same time, Bogdan Khmelnitsky successfully invaded uncontrolled lands. Together with Vasiliy Buturlin, they besieged Lviv on September 16, and four days later Grigory Romodanovsky defeated Stanisław Potocki at battle of Horodok, he lost more than 1,000 men killed, 200 captured and wagon train. In parallel, the Russians occupied Lublin. However, in November, Khan Mehmed Giray marched against them, the Russians took a ransom from the city and marched towards him. Crimeans lost 10,000 in the battle of Ozerna and even agreed to stop helping the Poles, but the Russians also lost the opportunity to occupy Lviv.

== Bibliography ==
- Babulin, Igor (2018). Смоленский поход и битва при Шепелевичах 1654 года [Smolensk campaign and the battle of Shepelevichi in 1654)]. Ratnoe delo (in Russian). Moscow: Русские витязи. ISBN 978-5-9909607-1-8.
- Kurbatov, Oleg A. (2019). Русско-Польская война 1654-1667 гг. [Russo-Polish War of 1654-1667] (in Russian). издано при помощи ПАО "Транснефть". Moscow: Runivers. ISBN 978-5-905719-19-6.
- Bobiatyński, Konrad (2004). Od Smoleńska do Wilna [From Smolensk to Vilnius] (in Polish). Zabrze: Inforteditions. ISBN 83-89943-00-X.
- Haratym, Andrzej (2020). Smoleńsk 1654 (in Polish). Warszawa: Ministerstwo kultury i dziedzictwa narodowego. ISBN 978-8-386156-92-4.
- Kubala, Ludwik (1910). Wojna moskiewska roku 1654, 1655 [Moscow war of 1654, 1655] (in Polish). Warszawa: Gebenther i spółka.
- Leśniewski, Sławomir (2024). Chmielnicki. Burzliwe losy Kozaków [Khmelnytsky. The turbulent fate of the Cossacks] (in Polish). Kraków: literackie. ISBN 9788308084250.
- Malov, Alexander V. (2006). Русско-Польская война 1654-1667 гг. [Russo-Polish War of 1654-1667] (in Russian). Moscow: Цейхгауз. ISBN 5-94038-111-1.
- Velikanov, Vladimir S.; Lazarev, Yakov A. (2020). Царские воеводы и гарнизоны на Украине 1654-1669 [Tsarist voevodes and garrisons in Ukraine 1654-1669] (in Russian). Russian Academy of Sciences: Ratnoe delo. Moscow: Русские витязи. ISBN 978-5-907245-00-6.
