= Battle of Vilnius (1655) =

1655 Russia captures the city during the Russo-Polish War

- Part of the Muscovite–Polish War (1654–1667)
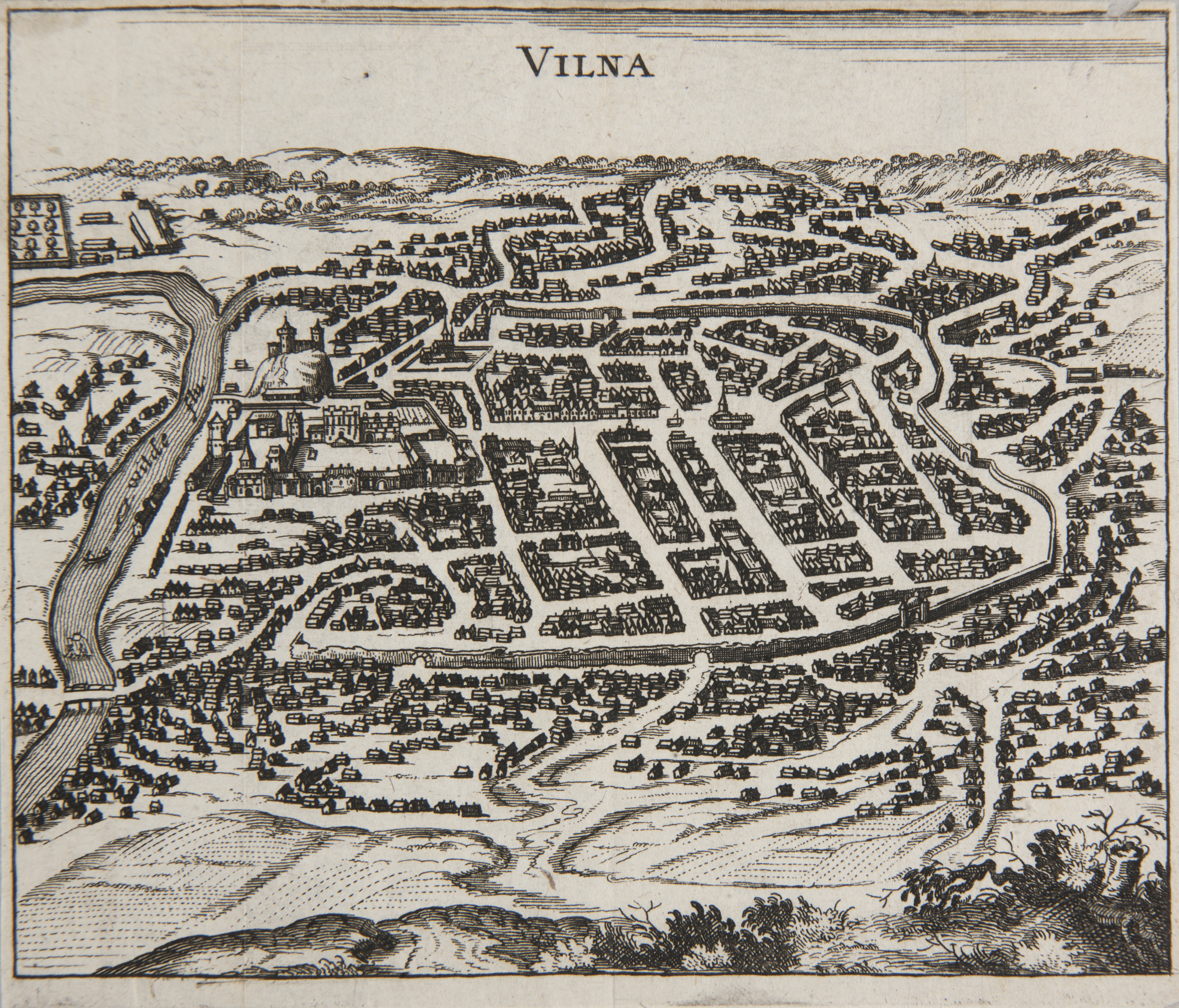
- Map of Vilnius in 1659
Date	29 July 1655 (O.S.); 8 August 1655 (N.S)
Location	Vilnius, Vilnius Voivodeship, Grand Duchy of Lithuania, Polish–Lithuanian Commonwealth
Result	Russo–Cossack victory

Belligerents
Tsardom of Russia; Cossack Hetmanate	Polish–Lithuanian Commonwealth

Commanders and leaders
Yakov Cherkasskiy; Ivan Zolotarenko	Janusz Radziwiłł; Wincenty Korwin Gosiewski

Strength
41,000 (incl. 35,000 engaged)	4,000–6,000

Casualties and losses
Unknown	2,000 killed and wounded (incl. 500 killed and 110 captured)
- ~20,000 civilians were massacred

The Battle of Vilnius was an attack by Russian and Cossack forces on Vilnius, the capital of the Grand Duchy of Lithuania within the Polish–Lithuanian Commonwealth, that occurred on 8 August 1655 during the Russo-Polish War (1654–67). The Polish–Lithuanian forces under the leadership of Grand Hetman of Lithuania Janusz Radziwiłł were defeated by the Russian army of Alexis of Russia. It was the first time that a foreign power managed to capture the Vilnius Castle. The six-year Muscovite occupation that followed resulted in a major depopulation and a decline of the city for many years to come. The defeat was one of the reasons Janusz Radziwiłł and several other Lithuanian magnates surrendered the Grand Duchy to Sweden at the Union of Kėdainiai.

== Battle ==
The Polish–Lithuanian Commonwealth was invaded by large Russian (starting the Russo-Polish War (1654–67) in July 1654) and Swedish armies (starting the Swedish Deluge in July 1655). When a large Russian army approached Vilnius, hetman Janusz Radziwiłł could muster just 5,000 to 7,000 men. The morale was further damaged by the order of king John II Casimir Vasa to royal troops (about 5,000 men) to retreat to Marienburg. Lithuanian commanders hetman Janusz Radziwiłł and treasurer Wincenty Korwin Gosiewski could not agree on defense. City residents began hasty evacuations. Most valued treasures, including the coffin of Saint Casimir, main books of Lithuanian Metrica, and valuables from Vilnius Cathedral, were transported outside the city.

Radziwiłł took up a defensive position on the northern shore of the Neris river near the present-day Green Bridge to cover the evacuations. The battle started around 6 a.m. and lasted the whole day. The Lithuanians managed to capture three Russian flags. At night, the Lithuanian army split into two groups that retreated to Vilkaviškis and to Kėdainiai. The garrison of the Vilnius Castle surrendered two days later.

== Aftermath and plunder ==
The invading forces plundered the city and murdered its inhabitants for several days. A fire consumed part of the city. In particular, the Jewish quarter was burned by the Cossacks and many Jews were killed. According to an eyewitness, the fire lasted 17 days and the death toll exceeded 20,000 people. However, those are exaggerated numbers. All palaces were looted and only four churches were spared. The invaders not only took valuables such as furniture or silverware, but also smashed altars, desecrated graves (including silver sarcophagus of the Sapieha family), and tore down decorative elements (such as marble columns of the Radziwiłł Palace). The Palace of the Grand Dukes of Lithuania fell into ruins and was rebuilt only in 2000s. Some scholars have suggested that certain relics, as well as the body of Vytautas the Great, were lost during the plunder of Vilnius Cathedral. Tsar Alexis of Russia arrived at the city on 14 August. He could not find suitable accommodations in the city and instead built a large tent in Lukiškės. He proclaimed himself the Grand Duke of Lithuania.

The Lithuania's capital Vilnius was liberated by the Lithuanian military forces in 1661.
