= Battle of Kutyszcze =

Battle of Kutyshche (Kutyszcze)
- Part of the Chudniv campaign and Russo-Polish War (1654–1667)
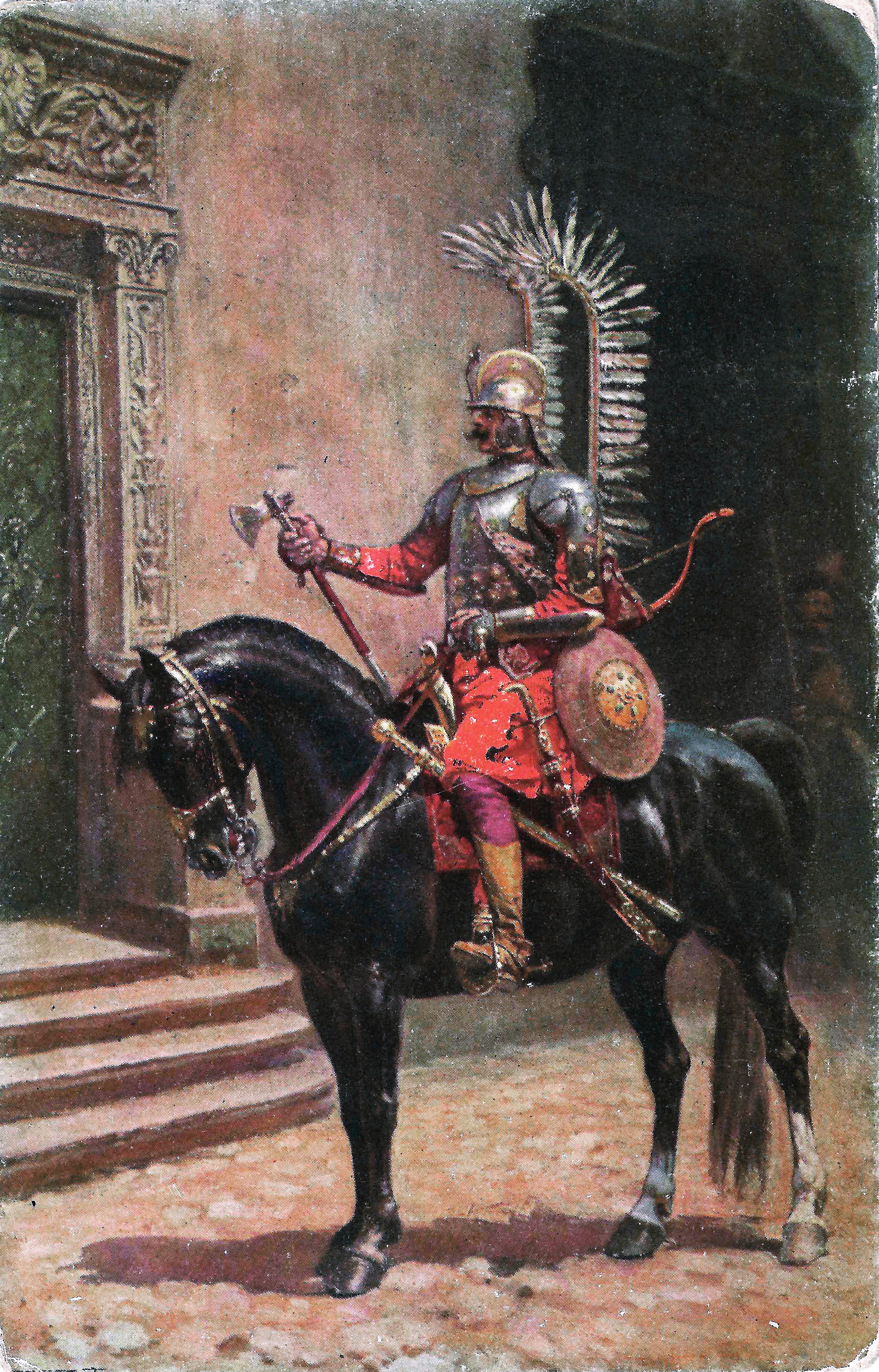
- The hetman's guard by W. Pawliszak.
Date	26 September 1660 (O.S. 16 September 1660)
Location	Kutyshche, Zhytomyr Raion (between Liubar and Chudniv)
Result	Polish–Lithuanian victory

Belligerents
Polish–Lithuanian Commonwealth	Tsardom of Russia; Cossack Hetmanate

Commanders and leaders
(Polish–Lithuanian Commonwealth) Władysław Wilczkowski (Polish–Lithuanian Commonwealth) Stanisław Wyżycki	(Tsardom of Russia) Vasily Borisovich Sheremetev

Strength
140	3,500

Casualties and losses
1 killed	Heavy

The Battle of Kutyshche or Kutyszcze (Note: Ukrainian: Кутище, romanized: Kutyshche. Polish: Kutyszcze.) took place on 26 September 1660 (O.S. 16 September 1660), during the Polish-Russian War of 1654—1667, and was part of the Chudniv campaign conducted by the Crown army of the Polish–Lithuanian Commonwealth under the command of Jerzy Sebastian Lubomirski and Stanisław Rewera Potocki, supported by Tatar forces. Their objective was to destroy the Russian and tsarist Cossack army under Vasyl Sheremetev and Tymish Tytsiura, before they joined forces with the Cossack troops of Yurii Khmelnytsky. The latter had been forced to fight for Russia in October 1659, and was seeking the right time restore his allegiance to the Commonwealth.

== Background ==
After the lost clashes at Lyubar, the Russian and tsarist Cossack troops were forced to retreat towards Chudniv. On the morning of 26 September, they set off from the fortified camp in a tabor formation. Polish forces quickly organised a pursuit, catching up with the enemy's artillery in the Kutyszcze wilderness, a few kilometres east of Lubar.

== Battle ==
The rear guard of the Russian-Cossack army consisted of two regiments of raiding cavalry (600-700 soldiers) and a Cossack infantry regiment (about 1,000 soldiers). However, according to Radosław Sikora, it was 3,500 people. This formation was struck by two hussar banners Wilczkowski's and Wyżycki's supported by dragoons. The hussar charge was conducted according to the principles of the later Hetman's Order slowly approaching the enemy, withstanding fire and striking violently with lances. Despite the shelling of the Russian raiders, the losses of the hussars were minimal. The strike broke the enemy's cavalry formation, which threw itself into retreat, also disorganising the Cossack infantry. The Poles continued the attack, capturing three banners and inflicting heavy losses on the enemy. Eventually, some of the Cossacks took refuge in a nearby forest, where they organised an effective defence.

== Aftermath ==
The Battle of Kutyszcze did not determine the outcome of the campaign, but it weakened the morale of the Russian-Cossack army and delayed its march towards Cudnow. The loss of the ariergarde, the chaos in the ranks and the growing fear of the Polish hussars influenced further hostilities. This clash is considered an example of the effective use of Polish cavalry, whose actions supported the overall success of the Crown troops in the Chudniv campaign.

== Bibliography ==
- Sikora, Radosław (2011). Niezwykłe bitwy i szarże husarii (in Polish). Warszawa: Instytut wydawniczy. ISBN 978-83-64185-28-1.
