= The Ruin (Ukrainian history) =

Tumultuous period in Ukrainian history from 1659 to 1686

- Part of aftermath of the Khmelnytsky Uprising
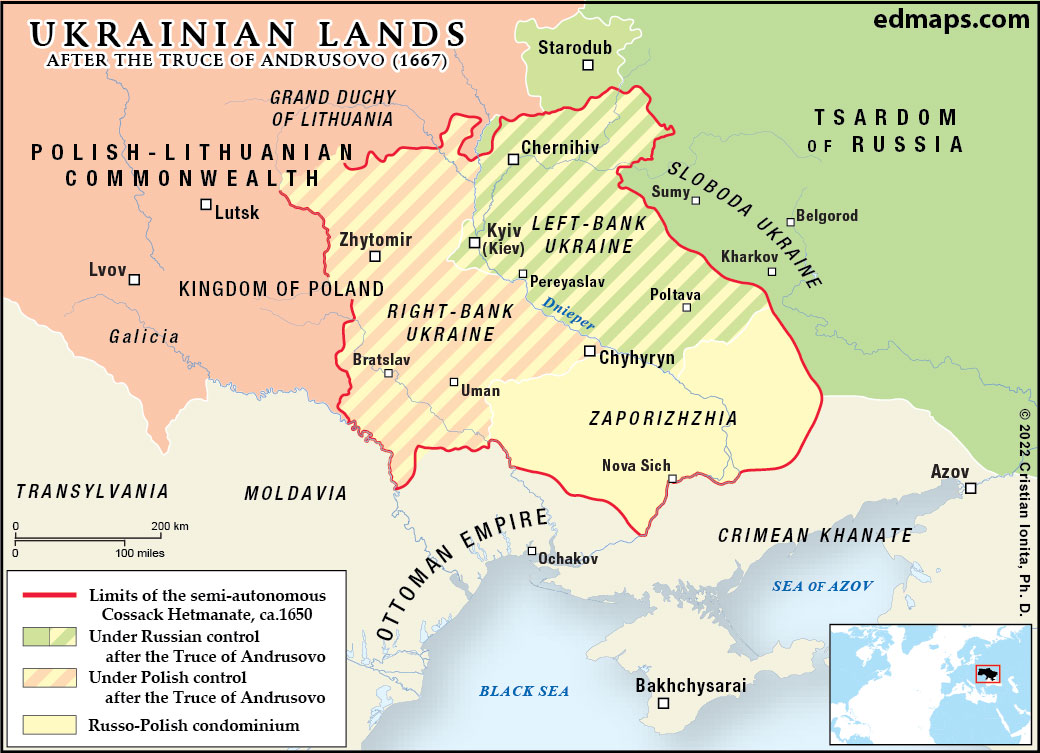
- Division of Ukrainian lands according to the Treaty of Andrusovo (1667)
Date	6 August 1657 – 25 July 1687
Location	Cossack Hetmanate (modern Ukraine)
Result	See § Aftermath
Territorial changes	Left-bank Ukraine with Kyiv and the territories of the Zaporizhia came under the Russian control; Right-bank Ukraine first came under the Polish control and later partially under the Ottoman control

Belligerents
Right-bank Ukraine; Polish–Lithuanian Commonwealth	Ottoman-allied Right-bank Ukraine (from 1669); Ottoman Ukraine; Ottoman Empire (from 1669)	Left-bank Ukraine; Tsardom of Russia Lower Host (Sirko's faction) (Note: Ivan Sirko was the most notable Kosh Otaman of the Zaporozhian Sich during this period and held substanitonal influence there even when he wasn't holding this title. He often took pro-Moscow position. However, he got into conflicts with the Tsar and pro-Russian Hetmans over the question of Sich's independent policy (see Sich-Tsardom crisis), also briefly supported Petro Doroshenko and Mykhailo Khanenko.)	Lower Host; Crimean Khanate (1668–1669)

Commanders and leaders
Pro-Polish and/or Right-bank hetmans: Ivan Vyhovsky (executed); Pavlo Teteria; Mykhailo Khanenko (surrendered); Yurii Khmelnytsky; Ostap Hohol #	Ottoman-appointed hetmans: Petro Doroshenko (surrendered); Yurii Khmelnytsky (executed); George Ducas (surrendered)	Pro-Moscow and/or Left-bank hetmans: Yakym Somko (executed) (acting); Ivan Briukhovetsky (executed); Demian Mnohohrishny; Ivan Samoylovych	Kish otamans of Zaporozhian Sich: Yakiv Barabash (executed); Petro Sukhoviy; Mykhailo Khanenko (1669–70); Ivan Sirko

The Ruin (Ukrainian: Руїна, romanized: Ruyina) is a historical term introduced by the Cossack chronicle writer Samiilo Velychko (1670–1728) for the political situation in Ukrainian history during the second half of the 17th century.

The timeframe of the period varies among historians:

- Some historians such as Mykola Kostomarov define the period between 1663 and 1687, associating it with the three Moscow-appointed hetmans of Left-bank Ukraine (Briukhovetsky, Mnohohrishny and Samoylovych).
- Other historians interpret the period between 1660 and 1687, from the Treaty of Chudnov that led to division among the Cossack community.
- Borys Krupnytsky considered the timeframe as 1657–1687, from the death of hetman Bohdan Khmelnytsky in 1657, particularly the Pushkar-Barabash Mutiny, until the ascension of hetman Ivan Mazepa in 1687.

The period was characterised by continuous strife, civil war, and foreign intervention by neighbours of Ukraine. A Ukrainian saying of the time, Від Богдана до Івана не було гетьмана "From Bohdan to Ivan, there was no hetman [in between]", accurately summarises the chaotic events of this period.

== Background ==
The Ruin started after the death of hetman Bohdan Khmelnytsky in 1657. Khmelnytsky had delivered Ukraine from centuries of Polish and Lithuanian domination through the campaigns of the Khmelnytsky Uprising (1648–1657) and Ukraine's Treaty of Pereiaslav (1654) with the Tsardom of Moscow. Khmelnytsky did not establish clear rules of succession and his will favoured his son Yurii as the new hetman. Yurii Khmelnytsky (1641–1685), young and inexperienced, lacked the charisma and the leadership qualities of his father, as he showed during his attempts to rule (1657, 1659–1663, 1677–1681, 1685).

At the time of Bohdan Khmelnytsky's death, the Cossack state had a territory of about 250,000 square kilometres (97,000 sq mi) and a population of around 1.2 to 1.5 million. Society consisted of the remaining non-Catholic nobles, the starshina or richer Cossack officers, the mass of the Cossacks and those peasants who did not bear arms. The Orthodox Church held 17% of the land; local nobles held 33%. The remaining 50% had been confiscated from the Poles and was up for grabs. Ukrainians comprised a frontier society with no natural borders, no tradition of statehood and a population committed to Cossack liberty or anarchy.

The confiscated lands could easily change hands in any conflict. There was an unresolved conflict between the mass of poorer Cossacks and the wealthier group who aspired to semi-noble status. The state was weak and needed a protector, but of the regional powers, the Poles wanted to take the Ukrainian lands back, Muscovite-Russian autocracy fitted ill with Cossack ideals of liberty, the Crimean Khanate concentrated on slave-raiding and the Cossacks of the Zaporozhian Sich engaged in counter-raiding while the Turks of the Ottoman Empire showed little concern for the Ukrainian frontier. The Swedish Empire's territory remained still too far away during this period, and the Don Cossacks and the Kalmucks stayed out of the conflict.

The history of Ukraine in this period became very complex. Basic themes included:

- The failure to find a single leader of Ukraine who could pursue a consistent policy
- The constant switching of alliances with outside powers who had their own interests
- Conflict between richer and poorer Cossacks
- The influence of the Orthodox Church, which tended to favour coreligionist Moscow

== Prelude to the Ruin 1648–1657 ==
1648-57: Khmelnytsky: Crimea and Russia: Khmelnytsky started his rebellion in alliance with the Khanate of Crimea. When his acceptance of Russian overlordship in 1654 (Treaty of Pereiaslav) led to the Russo-Polish War (1654–1667), the Crimeans switched sides and began raiding Ukraine. In his last years Khmelnytsky distanced from Russia and was negotiating with Sweden and Transylvania.

== Left and right banks 1657–1663 ==
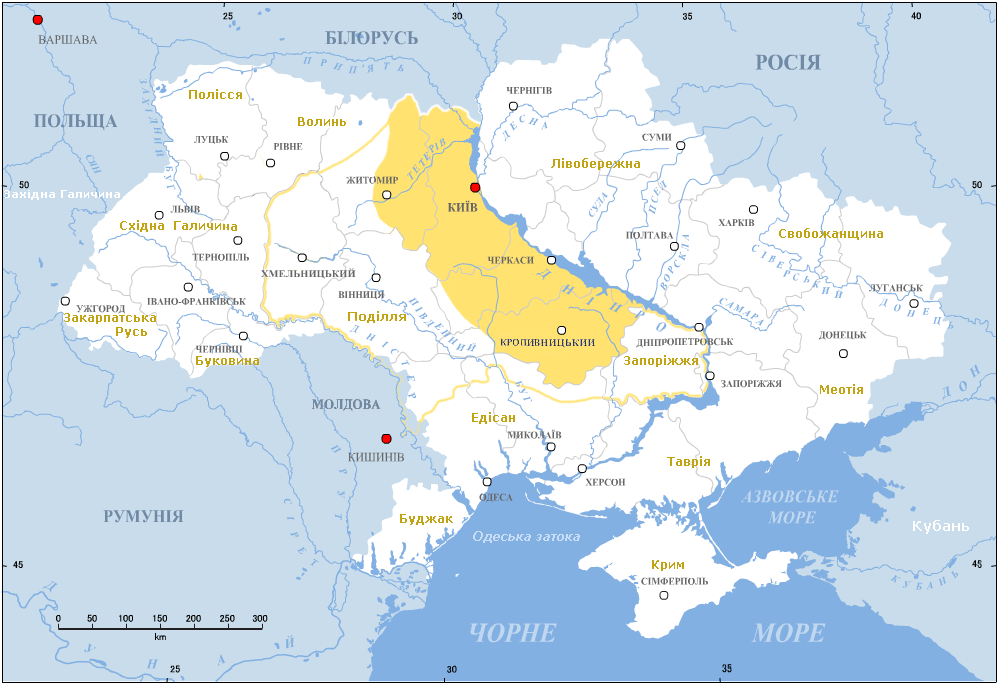
Right-bank Ukraine in the 17th and 18th centuries

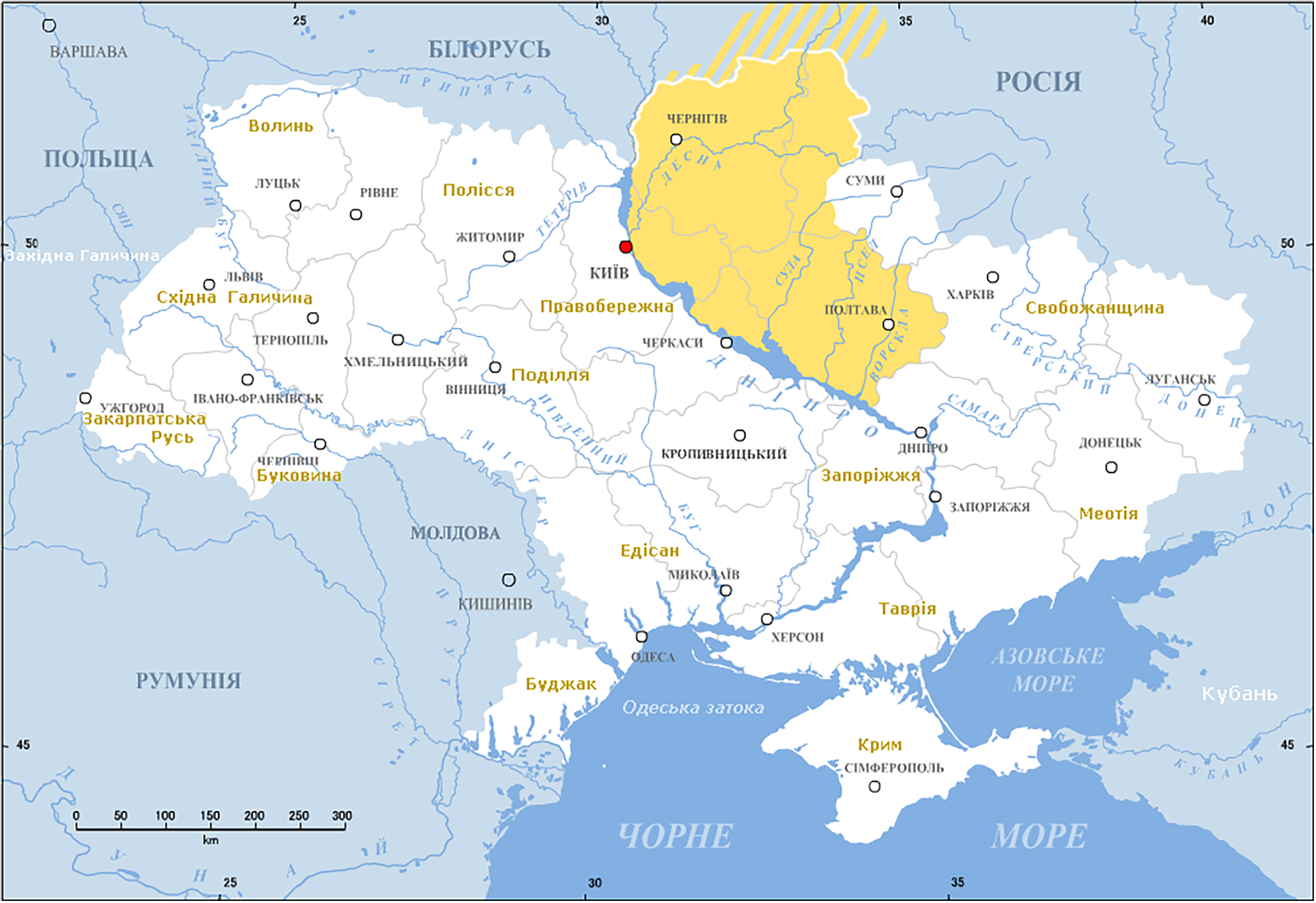
Left-bank Ukraine in the 17th and 18th centuries

1657-59: Vyhovsky and the Poles: At the time of Khmelnytsky's death his son Yurii was only 16, so the hetmanate was given to Ivan Vyhovsky (regent). He based his power on the richer cossacks ('starshina') and sought a rapprochement with Poland. This led to a rebellion of the more democratic cossacks Martyn Pushkar and Yakiv Barabash, which was defeated in June 1658, a civil war that cost about 50,000 lives. In September 1658 he signed the Treaty of Hadiach with Poland, which would have turned Ukraine into a third member of the Polish–Lithuanian commonwealth, but the treaty was never implemented. The treaty led to a Muscovite-Ukrainian War where Russians were defeated at the Battle of Konotop on 29 June 1659. Faced with a revolt by several pro-Moscow colonels, Vyhovsky resigned and retired to Poland in October 1659.

1659-63: Yurii Khmelnytsky: Russia and Poland: The hetmanate passed to Bohdan's son Yurii Khmelnytsky who was now about 18. In 1659 he was forced to sign the Pereiaslav Articles, which were often confused with the treaty itself. They significantly increased Russian power. The next year, fighting resumed between Russia and Poland. Yurii hung back. After a number of Polish victories, Yurii agreed to return Ukraine to the commonwealth. This led the left-bank cossacks under Yakym Somko to depose him. Depressed by this effective partition of Ukraine, in January 1663 Yurii surrendered his hetman's mace and retired to a monastery.

== Polish right bank 1663–1681 ==
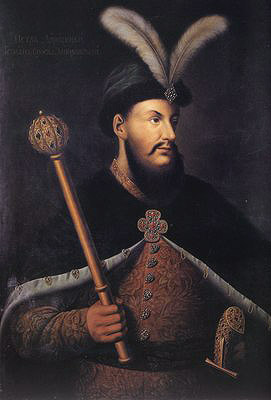
Hetman Petro Doroshenko

1663-65: Teteria and Poland: Pavlo Teteria, who held only the right bank, followed a strongly pro-Polish policy. When his invasion of the left bank failed, he returned to deal with the numerous rebellions that had broken out against the Poles. The behaviour of his Polish allies cost him what little support he had, and he resigned and fled to Poland.

1665-76: Doroshenko and the Turks: The goal of Petro Doroshenko was to re-unite the two halves of Ukraine. He held frequent councils to cultivate the poorer cossacks and created a 20,000 man band of mercenaries to free himself from the starshina. In 1667, Russia and Poland, without consulting the cossacks, signed the Treaty of Andrusovo, which partitioned the cossack lands at the Dnieper river. The thinly populated southern area (Zaporozhia) was to be a Russo-Polish condominium, but it was in practice self-governing, to the extent that it had a government. In response, Doroshenko turned to the Turks (Polish-Cossack-Tatar War (1666–1671)). In the fall of 1667 an Ottoman-Cossack force invaded Galicia and compelled the king to grant extensive autonomy to Doroshenko. He accepted a loose Ottoman overlordship, invaded the left bank, removed the rival hetman and in 1668 declared himself hetman of a united Ukraine. Crimea backed another rival hetman and the Poles backed Mykhailo Khanenko, with whom they invaded the right bank. Turning to meet the invaders, he placed Demian Mnohohrishny in control of the left bank, which quickly came under Russian control. In 1672 he helped the Turks annex Podolia. During the Russo-Turkish War (1676–1681) he aided the Turks against Russia. This involvement with non-Christians cost him his remaining support. On 19 September 1676, he gave up authority to Ivan Samoylovych of the left bank and went into exile in Russia.

1678-81: Yurii Khmelnytsky and the Turks: In 1678 the Turks, who had a large army in the area, appointed their prisoner Yurii Khmelnytsky as hetman. He participated in the second campaign of Chyhyryn and was deposed by the Turks in 1681.

At this point, English sources become thin. The Right Bank was severely depopulated, many of those who were not killed or enslaved by the Tatars having fled to the Left Bank or Sloboda Ukraine. Polish rule was gradually restored and the country began to fill up again.

== Russian left bank 1661–1687 ==
1661-63: Somko and the Starshina: In 1660 the left-bank Cossacks deposed Yurii Khmelnytsky because of the Polish alliance and made Yakym Somko the Acting Hetman. Yurii held on to the right bank, effectively partitioning the country. Somko favored the upper class, provoking the opposition of the Zaporozhians under Briukhovetsky. He also lost the support of Moscow. At the Chorna rada of 1663, he was replaced by Briukhovetsky and executed.

Ivan Samoylovych

1663-68: Briukhovetsky and the Russians 1663–1668: Ivan Briukhovetsky was almost completely dependent on Russia. In 1665 he went to Moscow and signed the Moscow Articles of 1665. Russian tax collectors and soldiers were allowed in, a Russian was to be head of the church, a Russian representative would be present at hetman elections and the Hetman would go to Moscow for confirmation. Soldiers and tax collectors provoked resistance and the church resisted Moscow influence. The Truce of Andrusovo (1667) seemed a Russian betrayal of Cossack interests. A series of revolts broke out. Briukhovetsky back-pedaled. In the spring of 1668, as Doroshenko's forces crossed the Dnieper, Briukhovetsky was beaten to death by a mob.

1668-72: Mnohohrishny and Left Bank Autonomy: On 9 June 1668 Doroshenko proclaimed himself hetman of a united Ukraine. In 1669 the Poles set up a rival hetman, Mykhailo Khanenko, and invaded the right bank. Turning to meet the invasion, Doroshenko placed Demian Mnohohrishny as acting hetman of the left bank. As Doroshenko weakened, under Russian pressure, he accepted Russian supremacy. A stable relationship developed as Moscow moderated its demands and Mnohohrisny protected local interests. He made some progress in restoring law and order but could not control the starshina. Some of these denounced him to the Tsar, who had him arrested, tortured and exiled to Siberia.

1672-87: Samoylovych and Russia: When Ivan Samoylovych was elected hetman he agreed to limited powers. He could not judge the starshina or carry on foreign relations without the consent of the starshina council. He disbanded the hired troops under the hetman's direct control. In 1674 and 1676 he and his Russian ally besieged Doroshenko at Chyhyryn. On September 19, 1676, Doroshenko surrendered to Samylovych, who declared himself hetman of a united Ukraine. But within two years the Turks drove him back across the Dnieper. Poland and Russia signed the Eternal Peace Treaty of 1686, which again recognized Polish rule of the right bank and removed the Poles from Zaporozhia, a major disappointment for Samoylovych. In 1687, 100,000 Russians and 50,000 Cossacks launched an attack on the Crimea (Crimean campaigns), which failed. Samoylovych was blamed, removed, and exiled to Siberia.

== Aftermath ==
The Ruin brought an end to the unity of the nascent Ukrainian Cossack state, splitting it into two and later three competing Hetmanates, each sponsored by one of the three powers neighbouring it. Disagreements over grand strategy after Khmelnytsky's death led to frequently changing alliances, often formed and broken by international dynamics outside of Ukraine's control, especially the Swedish Deluge. Ukraine would achieve only limited international diplomatic recognition as a sovereign state before The Ruin brought about its partition.

For the Russian Tsardom and the Polish–Lithuanian Commonwealth, The Ruin ended in a compromise: both had gone to war in 1654 to gain or regain the entire Cossack Hetmanate, but only managed to control one bank of the Dnipro. Whereas the Commonwealth kept Right-bank Ukraine including Ukraine's then-largest city Lviv and the former Hetmanate capital Chyhyryn, the Tsardom managed to retain Kyiv and Left-bank Ukraine. Petro Doroshenko's attempts to seize the Commonwealth-backed Hetmanate with the Ottoman support ended in failure, which led to devastation of the Right-bank Ukraine and mass migration of Ruthenians (Ukrainians) to the Left-bank. The Russian Tsardom and Poland-Lithuania signed the Eternal Peace Treaty in 1686.

With the election of Ivan Mazepa as hetman, the Ruin effectively came to an end, and the history of the left-bank merged with the Hetmanate as part of Russia. With the start of the Great Northern War in 1700, Russian demands began to seem excessive. In 1708 Mazepa allied himself with Charles XII of Sweden. At the Battle of Poltava, Charles, Mazepa and those Cossacks that followed him were defeated and exiled to the Ottoman Empire.

== List of treaties ==
Ukraine during the hetmancy of Ivan Vyhovsky (1657–1659)

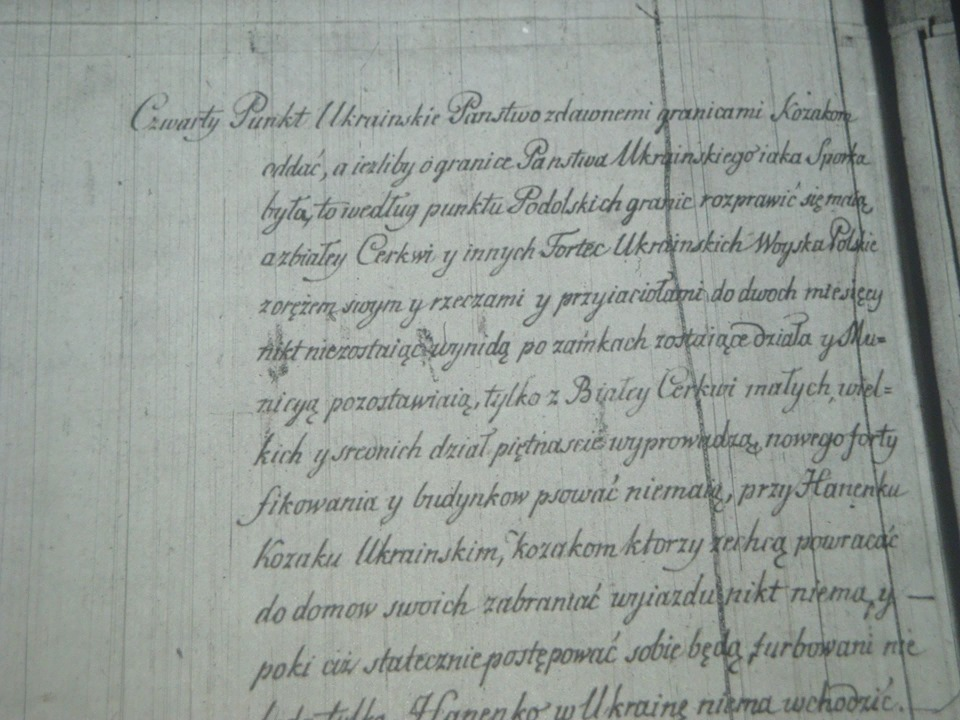
Mention of "Ukrainian State" (Polish: Ukrainskie Panstwo) in the text of the Treaty of Buchach (1672)

For reference, this is a list of treaties and agreements during the period. See also List of interstate treaties of the Cossack Hetmanate, and List of battles of the Polish–Russian War (1654–1667).

1640s

- 1648: Treaty of Bakhchisarai: Ukrainian Cossacks ally with the Crimean Khanate; lasted 5 years
- 1648: Truce of Zamość: short-lived compromise, preliminary recognition of the Cossack Hetmanate's autonomy
- 1649: Truce of Pereiaslav: short-lived compromise
- 1649: Treaty of Zboriv: 40,000 Registered Cossacks; only Orthodox officials and no Polish soldiers, Uniates (including Jesuit priests) or Jews as citizens in central Ukraine (Voivodeships of Kyiv, Chernihiv and Braslav); not implemented

1650s

- 1651: Treaty of Bila Tserkva: 20,000 Registered Cossacks; Jews and nobles to return; partly implemented
- 1653: Treaty of Kamianets (1653): The Crimean Khanate betrays the Cossack Hetmanate and allies with Poland; lasted 13 years until it broke down in 1666
- 1654 (January): Pereiaslav Agreement: Cossack alliance with Russia; provokes Russo-Polish War (1654–1667); lasted 2.5 years
- 1655 (spring): Zaporizhian Host council concludes the Cossack Hetmanate cannot come to an understanding with the Polish Crown.
- 1655 (October): Union of Kėdainiai: Lithuania (including Belarus) joins Sweden in a personal union, and breaks away from the Commonwealth with Poland; lasted 1 year
- 1655 (autumn): Tsar accepts Austrian ambassadors in Moscow to initiate peace talks with Poland. Ukrainian Hetmanate opposes peace on terms proposed, but Tsar ignores Ukraine
- 1656 (May): Russia breaks off diplomatic relations with Sweden in May, and declares war on Sweden in July.
- 1656 (November): Truce of Vilna: Russia signs a separate peace with Poland, abandons and betrays the Ukrainian Cossacks; lasted 2 years
- 1656 (December): Treaty of Radnot: Sweden and Transylvania agree to give Ukraine to the Cossacks; partly implemented by the Treaty of Korsun next year
- 1657 (October): Treaty of Korsun: Sweden recognises the Cossack Hetmanate as an independent state, seeks the Commonwealth's recognition of the Hetmanate, as well as the inclusion of the Western Ukrainian and Southwestern Belarusian voivodeships; partly implemented
- 1658: Treaty of Hadiach: Ukraine a third member of the Commonwealth; 30,000 registered Cossacks; partly implemented for 1 year, but Russia violated the Truce of Vilna and invaded Ukraine, Belarus, Lithuania and Poland again
- 1659: Zherdivski Articles: proposed alliance between Russia and an independent Ukraine; rejected by Trubetskoy, who forced Yurii Khmelnytsky to sign the Pereiaslav Articles of 1659 instead
- 1659: Pereiaslav Articles of 1659: Yurii Khmelnytsky is forced to sign a new subservient alliance with Russia; lasted 1 year

1660s

- 1660: Treaty of Chudniv: Yurii Khmelnytsky voluntarily signs a new alliance with Poland; lasted 2 years, but only in Right-bank Ukraine
- 1663: Baturyn Articles: Ivan Briukhovetsky ceded more autonomy of Left-bank Ukraine Muscovy; replaced by Moscow Articles of 1665
- 1665: Moscow Articles of 1665: Ivan Briukhovetsky ceded virtually all autonomy of Left-bank Ukraine to direct Muscovite military, fiscal and administrative control in return for becoming a boyar; on paper lasted 3 years, but broke down due to popular anti-Moscow sentiment in 1667 that escalating to the Left-Bank uprising in 1668
- 1666: The Crimean–Polish alliance broke down after 13 years. This had been the longest and most stable alliance during The Ruin. In late 1667, Crimea allied with Doroshenko's Cossacks against Poland.
- 1667: Truce of Andrusovo: Russia and Poland divide Ukraine along the Dnieper; but Kyiv to Russia, Zaporizhia a condominium; Cossacks excluded from negotiations; ends Russo-Polish War; to expire in 13 years
- 1667: Treaty of Pidhaitsi: Right-bank Ukraine under Petro Doroshenko signs an exclusive alliance with Jan Sobieski, who recognised the Horyn river as the western border of the Cossack state, beyond which the Polish Crown Army was not allowed to go; lasted 2 years
- 1669: Hlukhiv Articles: Left-bank Ukraine regains some autonomy from Muscovy after the 1668–1669 Left-Bank uprising broke down the Moscow Articles of 1665
- 1669: Treaty of Korsun (1669): Right-bank Ukraine under Petro Doroshenko defects from Poland and allies with the Ottoman Empire for an autonomous Ukraine with the status of a sanjak; preceded the 1672 Treaty of Buchach; not implemented

1670s

- 1670: Treaty of Ostroh: Right-bank Ukraine under Mykhailo Khanenko remained an autonomous hetmanate loyal to Poland; lasted 5 years
- 1672: Treaty of Buchach: During the Polish–Ottoman War (1672–1676); Podolia to the Ottomans; Right-bank Ukraine to Doroshenko as an Ottoman vassal; not implemented
- 1676: Treaty of Żurawno: confirms 1672 but more favorable to Poland; ends Turkish war

1680s and 1690s

- 1686: Treaty of Perpetual Peace (1686) confirms 1667; Zaporizhian Sich to Russia
- 1699: Treaty of Karlowitz: Poland regains Podolia

== Sources ==
- Orest Subtelny, 'Ukraine, A History', 2000: This article is largely a summary of Chapter 9.
- The Ruin (from Ukraine), Encyclopædia Britannica
- Encyclopedia of Ukraine
- Plokhy, Serhii (2022). The Gates of Europe: A History of Ukraine. New York, NY: Basic Books. p. 414. ISBN 978-0-465-07394-8.
