= Ivan Bohun =

Ukrainian Cossack leader (died 1664)

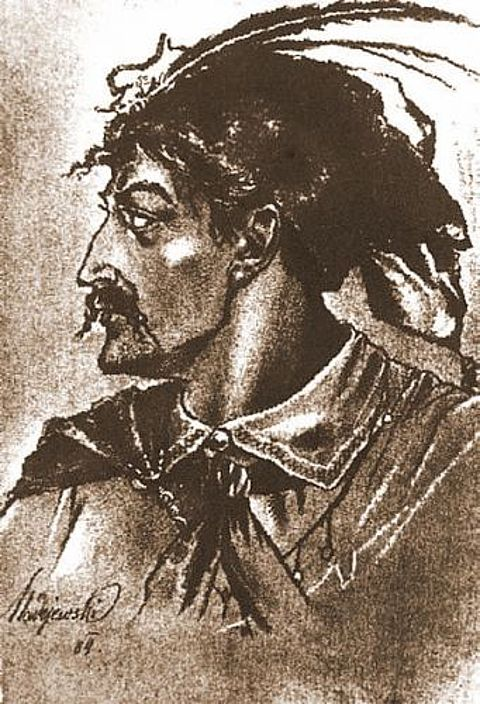
- Portrait by Yan Madeyevskyi in 1884
- Born: Around 1618; Bracław, Bracław Voivodeship, Polish–Lithuanian Commonwealth
- Died: 17 February 1664; Novhorod-Siverskyi, Starodub Regiment, Cossack Hetmanate
- Children: Tymofiy Bohun; Hryhoriy Bohun
- Military career
- Allegiance: Polish–Lithuanian Commonwealth (1640–1648); Zaporozhian Host (1648–1649); Cossack Hetmanate (1649–1664)
- Service years: 1640–1664
- Rank: Colonel
- Commands: Mohyliv Regiment; Kalnyk Regiment; Pavoloch Regiment
- Conflicts: See list: Smolensk War; Siege of Smolensk (1632–1633); Cossack raids; Siege of Azov (1637–1642); Khmelnytsky Uprising; Khmelnytsky's campaign; Battle of Korsun; Battle of Pyliavtsi; Siege of Zbarazh (WIA); Battle of Vinnytsia; Battle of Berestechko; Battle of Batih; Battle on Monastyryshche; Tymofiy's 3rd Moldavian campaign; Siege of Zhvanets; Siege of Uman (1654); Brest Campaign (1657); Muscovite–Polish War (1654–1667); Tsar Alexei's campaign of 1654–1655; Siege of Bratslav (1654); Siege of Uman (1655); Battle of Okhmativ (1655); Campaign against Vyhosky; Battle of Konotop; Bohun Uprising; Battle of Zhovnyn; Siege of Hlukhiv (executed)

Ivan Bohun (Ruthenian: Іванъ Богун; Ukrainian: Іван Богун; died 1664) was a Zaporozhian Cossack colonel. A close associate and friend of Bohdan Khmelnytsky, he opposed both the pacts with the Polish–Lithuanian Commonwealth (Treaty of Hadiach of 1658) and with the Tsardom of Russia (Pereiaslav Agreement of 1654).

== Biography ==
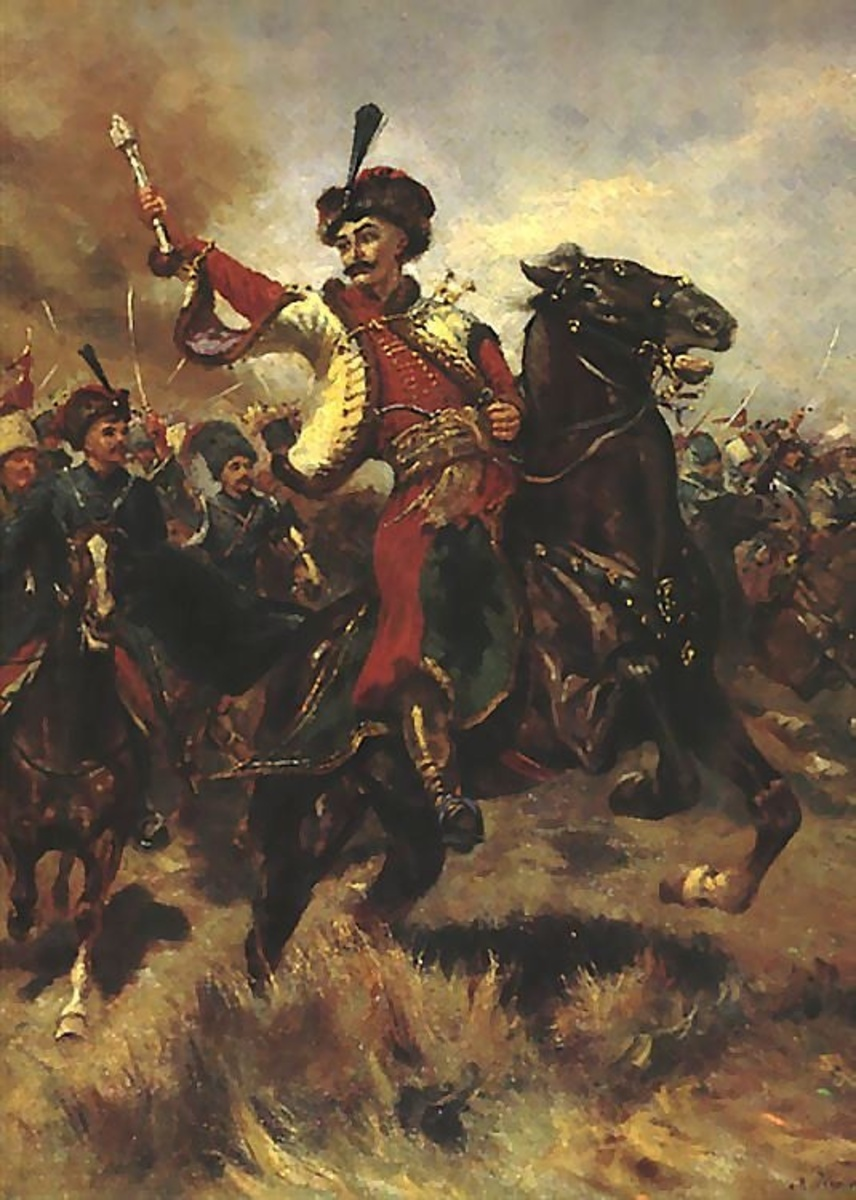
Ivan Bohun fighting Poles in the Battle of Berestechko

Bohun's coat of arms

Bohun was born into a Cossack-Ruthenian noble family. In 1637, he captured the Azov Fortress in a joint campaign with Don Cossacks and later took part in the subsequent Azov sitting. After being arrested by Polish authorities following an unsanctioned raid against Muscovite forces on the Don river in 1647, Bohun was sentenced to death on demand of the tsar. However, in 1648 he was able to escape from his cell in the Kodak Fortress and took part in the Khmelnytsky Uprising against Polish rule in Ukraine, leading Cossack troops in Bratslav Voivodeship. In June 1651 he was elected colonel of Vinnytsia Regiment and took part in the Battle of Berestechko against Polish troops led by King John II Casimir Vasa, taking command over Cossack forces in the absence of hetman Khmelnytsky.

Surviving the defeat at Berestechko, he regathered his forces and in June 1652 took part in the battle of Batih, which ended in Cossack victory over the forces of Marcin Kalinowski and future hetman Stefan Czarniecki, with the former dying as a result. The Polish defeat was complete and allowed the Cossack forces to start a successful offensive and effectively gain control over large parts of the Ukrainian lands. Until 1657 Ivan Bohun also led his forces in minor skirmishes against Polish forces, notably at Bratslav and Uman. He also fought against the formerly allied Crimean Tatars who had switched sides in the effect of the Treaty of Zboriv of 1649, joining the Commonwealth side.

Bohun opposed the signing of 1651 Treaty of Bila Tserkva, which returned much of Right-bank Ukraine under Polish control. He initially opposed the Pereiaslav Agreement of 1654 and supported a union with Sweden instead. After Khmelnytsky's death in 1657 he became a supporter of Ivan Vyhovsky, but got disillusioned following the latter's alliance with Poles. After the Battle of Konotop, he led an armed uprising against Vyhovsky near Konotop and defeated his army in the autumn of 1659. Opposed to both Polish and Muscovite rule, Bohun then became a close advisor of Yuri Khmelnytsky, who appointed him Chyhyryn colonel. However, he opposed the new hetman's Pereyaslav Articles, and in 1660 agreed to give up Vasily Borisovich Sheremetev to the Tatars at Chudniv.

After being captured by the Poles, in 1662 Bohun was imprisoned at Marienburg Fortress. In 1663 he was offered freedom in exchange for taking part in a new military campaign led by Right-bank hetman Pavlo Teteria and allied Polish forces against the Tsardom of Russia. During the retreat after the disastrous Siege of Hlukhiv, in February 1664 Bohun was executed by a firing squad near Novhorod-Siverskyi after being accused of handing over important military information to the besieged Russian garrison. It is suspected that Teteria had a role in his execution.

== Legacy ==
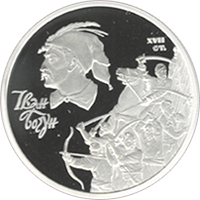
A modern Ukrainian coin dedicated to Bohun

An ambitious man and brilliant military commander, Bohun was recognized by his contemporaries Wespazjan Kochowski, Joachim Pastorius and Samuel Twardowski as an exemplary Sarmatian knight. He also became a popular Ukrainian folk hero and was immortalized by Henryk Sienkiewicz in the novel With Fire and Sword, where the character Jurko Bohun is loosely based on him. In the film based on the novel, directed by Jerzy Hoffman, Bohun was played by Aleksandr Domogarov.

Bohun's image as a popular hero was promoted by the Soviet regime. Bohun, a modern, historical novel about Polish-Cossack wars, written by Jacek Komuda, is also dedicated to him. Bohun's death is still commemorated annually in Lviv.

Ivan Bohun Military High School in Kyiv bears his name.

== See also ==
- Ruthenian nobility
