= Mykhailo Khanenko =

Ukrainian Cossack Hetman (ca. 1620–1680)

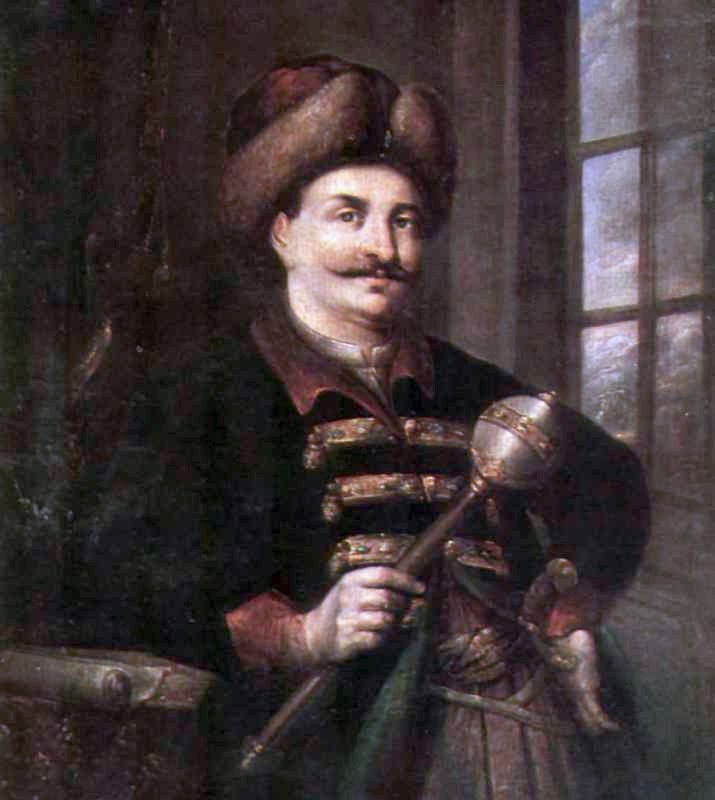
Hetman Khanenko

Mykhailo Stepanovych Khanenko (Polish: Michał Chanenko, Ukrainian: Михайло Степанович Ханенко, c. 1620 – 1680) was a Ukrainian Cossack military leader, and nominal hetman of Right-bank Ukraine from 1669 to 1674 in rivalry with Petro Doroshenko during The Ruin.

== Biography ==
Khanenko was the son of Zaporozhian Cossack Stepan Khanenko. In 1656, he became a colonel (polkovnyk) of Uman regiment, and fought in the Khmelnytsky uprising. He was one of many Cossacks who opposed the Pereiaslav Articles of 1659 which the Russian tsar had forced upon Yuri Khmelnytsky in October 1659, drastically limiting the Cossack Hetmanate's autonomy. Khmelnytsky reverted his allegiance back to the Commonwealth by the Treaty of Chudniv in October 1660; however, because it was only accepted on the Right bank and rejected by the Left bank, this effectively split the Hetmanate and thereby all of Ukraine in two along the Dnipro.

In 1661, Khanenko received a noble title from King John II Casimir of Poland.

Khanenko family coat-of-arms.

In 1669, he was proclaimed Hetman of Right-bank Ukraine by three regiments. Khanenko and otaman Ivan Sirko led raids on the Crimean Khanate and the Ottoman Empire. He was pro-Commonwealth, and greatly opposed to the pro-Ottoman rival hetman Petro Doroshenko whom he often fought, sometimes with Commonwealth support. In 1670 Khanenko signed the Treaty of Ostroh with the Commonwealth authorities, according to which authonomy of the Cossack class was recognized in exchange of the hetman's vassalage to the Commonwealth's king.

In 1674, Khanenko suffered a disastrous defeat to Doroshenko, and was forced to get the aid of Left-bank hetman Ivan Samoylovych. He renounced all claims to power, and swore loyalty to Moscow. In 1677-1678 Khanenko was imprisoned by Samoilovych in Baturyn after Moscow had suspected him of preserving ties with Poles, but later was released. He was allowed to live in peace on the left bank of the Dnieper and the exact time and place of his death are still unknown.

== Family ==
His nephew Danylo Khanenko served as a colonel of Lubny Regiment. Danylo's son Mykola Khanenko (1693-1760) was a notable political figure of the Cossack Hetmanate, a diplomat and an author of memoirs, who served under hetmans Ivan Skoropadsky, Pavlo Polubotok and Kyrylo Rozumovsky. Mykola's great-grandson Oleksandr Khanenko (1816-1895) was a collector of Ukrainian antiquities, as well as a civic and cultural activist, who served as a Marshal of the Nobility of Surazh county and took part in the Emancipation reform of 1861. Oleksandr's nephew Bohdan Khanenko (1849-1917) was an art collector and archaeologist who founded the Khanenko Museum in Kyiv.
