= Siege of Uman =

Siege of Uman may refer to:

- Siege of Uman (1654)
- Siege of Uman (1655)
- Siege of Uman (1674)
