= Battle of Slobodyshche =

Battle in the Russo-Polish War (1654–67)

Battle of Słobodyszcze or Battle of Slobodyshche took place around 7 and 8 October 1660 during the Russo-Polish War (1654–67) between Polish–Lithuanian Commonwealth (and their Tatar allies) and the Tsardom of Russia allied Cossacks near Slobodyshche (in modern Berdychiv Raion); it ended with a stalemate which was a tactical Polish victory as the Poles were able to continue the siege of Russian encampment at the battle of Chudniv.

Some historians speculate that there was never any battle of Slobodyshche, and it was a mystification created by Cossack leader Yurii Khmelnytsky and Polish commanders (Jerzy Sebastian Lubomirski) - Khmelnytsky did not want to aid Russian voivode Vasily Sheremetev who was besieged at Chudniv, and Poles were able to concentrate on that task - there is however no consensus on that variant.

Whether the battle took place or not, Khmelnytsky did not push his Cossacks for an assault on the Polish lines and (suffering from heavy desertions) he decided to enter negotiations with the Poles. The Treaty of Chudniv was signed on 17 October, mostly repeating the 1657 Treaty of Hadyach (although the creation of Grand Duchy of Ruthenia had to be confirmed by the Polish king) and pledging Cossacks allegiance to the Poles.
