= Battle of Okhmativ (1655) =

1655 battle

- Part of Russo-Polish War (1654–67) (Tsar Alexei's campaign of 1654–1655) and Khmelnytsky Uprising
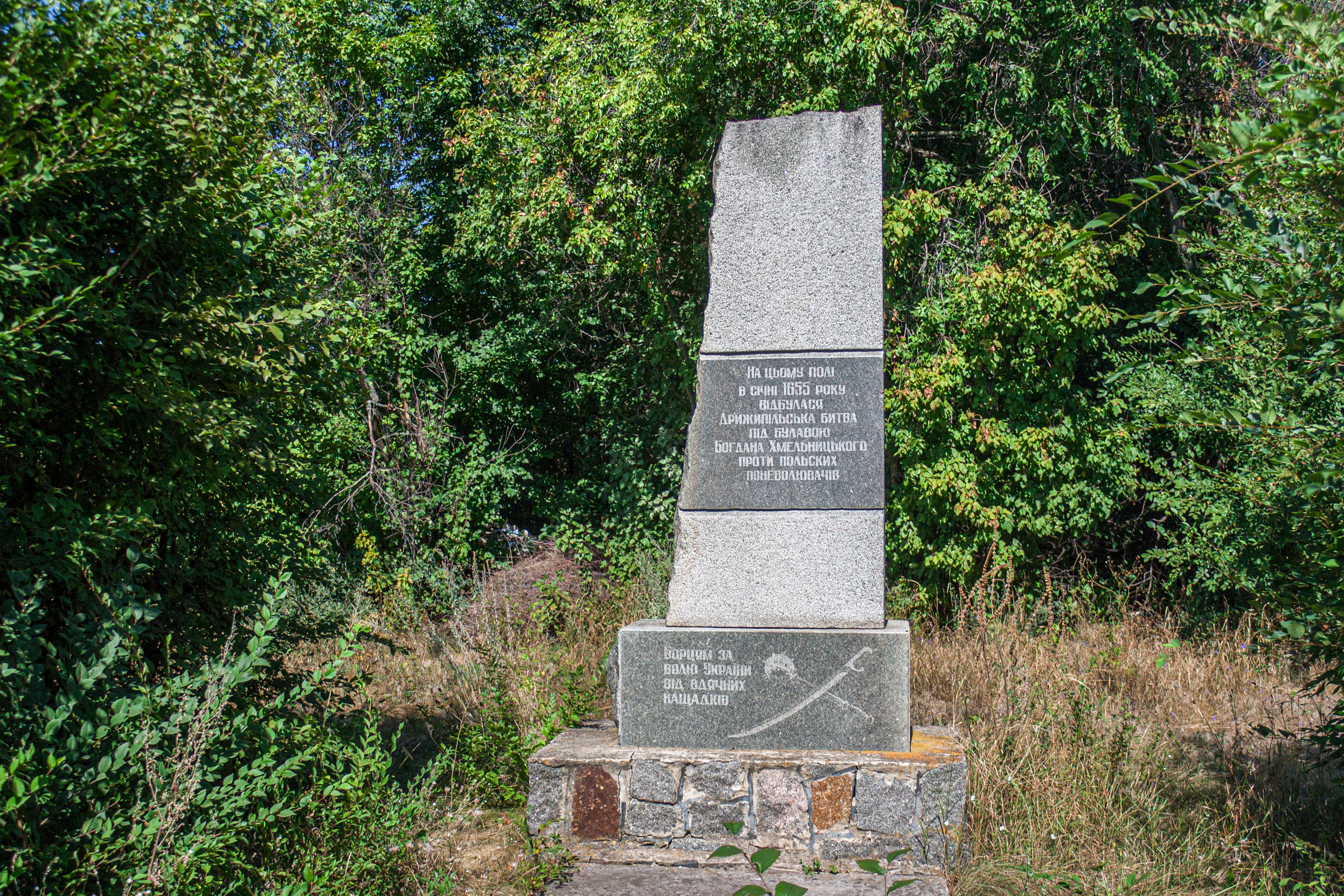
- A memorial sign at the site of the battle
Date	January 19 – January 22, 1655 (O.S); January 29 – February 1, 1655 (N.S.)
Location	Okhmativ, modern Cherkasy Oblast
Result	See § Aftermath

Belligerents
Polish–Lithuanian Commonwealth; Crimean Khanate	Cossack Hetmanate; Tsardom of Russia

Commanders and leaders
Stefan Czarniecki; Stanisław Potocki; Stanisław Lanckoroński; Mehmed IV Giray	Bohdan Khmelnytsky; Ivan Bohun (Tsardom of Russia) Vasily Sheremetev (Tsardom of Russia) Vasiliy Buturlin

Strength
20,000–53,000	34,000–60,000; 30 guns

Casualties and losses
6,000 casualties incl. 3,000 killed	1,000 - 2,000 killed (Tsardom of Russia) 2,000 killed

The Battle of Okhmativ or battle of Ochmatów (Polish: Bitwa pod Ochmatowem, Russian: Битва под Ахматовом, Ukrainian: Охматівська битва) took place around 19 January - 22 January 1655 (29 January - 1 February, N.S) during the Russo-Polish War (1654–67) between the armies of the Polish–Lithuanian Commonwealth and the Crimean Khanate on the one hand and of the Russian Tsardom and the Cossacks on the other.

== Prelude ==
The Russian-Cossack army led by Bohdan Khmelnytsky and Vasily Sheremetev went to the relief of Uman besieged by the Polish–Lithuanian army. When the commanders of the Polish army Stanisław Potocki and Stanisław Lanckoroński learned about the march of the Russians and Cossacks, they discontinued the siege and together with an army of the Crimean Khanate went out to meet them. Part of the Polish troops led by Szemberg was to guard the Puszkarenko group trapped in Okhmativ, numbering 2,000 soldiers, while the main force moved on 21 January in the north. The entire Polish–Tatar army marched in expanded battle array. The Russian-Cossack army went in laager formation.

== Battle ==
On the first day of the battle the Polish and Tatar cavalry clashed with Russian and Cossack cavalry. The cavalry battle was won by the Polish–Tatar side, so that the Russian-Cossack troops standing in laager lost their flank cover. The Russian-Cossack army was besieged. Polish infantry, cavalry and artillery interacting with each other led to the breach in the laager Russian-Cossack army. Khmelnytsky's desperate counterattack saved the Russians and Cossacks from disaster. Under the cover of artillery fire from the four surviving guns (the rest of the guns had been taken by the Poles during the assault) Khmelnytsky moved laager in the direction of hills. In the days January 30 and January 31 Russians and Cossacks conducted two attacks which, however, were repulsed. On the morning of 1 February, Khmelnytsky managed to break through to Okhmativ and save Puszkarenko. After this success he retreated to Buky. The Tatars saw futility on the battle and left the field. Deprived of support from the Tatars, the Poles were unable to stop the marching Russian-Cossack laager. Recent studies estimate the number of casualties among the Polish-Lithuanian Commonwealth army and the Tatars at 3,000, and the total number of casualties at 6,000. Among the Russian and Ukrainian forces, the number of casualties was 2,000 Russians and 1,000–2,000 Ukrainians.

== Aftermath and legacy ==
Some sources claim the battle ended in Polish victory, while others say it was inconclusive.

Due to the severe frost at the time of the battle, the location in which it took place became known among the Cossacks as Dryzhypole (Ukrainian: Дрижиполе - "shake-field").

== See also ==
- Siege of Uman (1654)
- Siege of Uman (1655)
