= Treaty of Ostroh =

The Treaty of Ostroh (Ukrainian: Острозька угода 1670) is a treaty signed on 12 September 1670 in the town of Ostroh between Hetman Mykhailo Khanenko of Right-Bank Ukraine and the government of the Polish–Lithuanian Commonwealth. On behalf of the latter, the document was signed by Stanisław Kazimierz Bieniewski and Stefan Konstanty Piaseczyński. It followed the 1660 Treaty of Chudniv.

== Terms ==
- ‘Security, freedoms and respect for all time’ were proclaimed for the Orthodox clergy.
- The inviolability of ancient military privileges in respect of any Cossack estates
- Preservation of Cossack privileges for the widows of deceased Cossacks
- A full amnesty for those Cossacks who return to the service of the King of the Polish-Lithuanian Commonwealth
- The Cossacks’ free election of a hetman, followed by his confirmation by the king. A ban on the office of hetman being held for life
- The Cossacks’ rejection of any patronage from the monarchs of other states
- The Zaporizhian Host, on the orders of the Crown Hetman, must set out immediately to repel the enemy
- A ban on the Cossacks receiving or sending any embassies without the King’s permission
- The nobility and the clergy had the right to return to their estates freely and without hindrance
- The Zaporizhian Host undertook to suppress, by its own means, any uprisings against allegiance to the Polish-Lithuanian Commonwealth, and to punish and execute those found guilty

== Sources ==
- Степанков В. Острозька комісія 1670 року: передумови, хід, наслідки / Валерій Степанков // Україна крізь віки: Збірник наукових праць на пошану академіка НАН України професора Валерія Смолія. — К. : Інститут історії України НАН України, 2010. — 1096 с.
- Степанков В. «Реляція панів комісарів Острозької комісії» (вересень 1670 р.) як джерело дослідження політичної історії Правобережного гетьманства // Спеціальні історичні дисципліни: питання теорії та методики: Збірка наукових праць на пошану відомого вченого, історика, українознавця, академіка Української Могилянсько–Мазепинської Академії наук (м. Оттава, Канада) Ярослава Івановича Дзири. — К., 2002. — Число 8–9. — Частина 2. — С. 172—173.
- Chukhlib, Taras, Острозька угода 1670 // Encyclopedia of History of Ukraine, Volume 7, pp. 688—690.
- Korzon T. Dola i niedola Jana Sobieskiego (1629—1674)]. — Kraków, 1898. — T. II. — S. 337—338.
- Stolicki J. Elity Rzeczypospolitej wobec Kozaczyzny w latach 1669—1670 // Україна та Росія: проблеми політичних і соціокультурних відносин. — К., 2003. — S. 261.

== External link ==
- Дорошенко П. Наказ гетьмана Петра Дорошенка послам у Острог М. Вуяхевичу, генеральному писарю, та Г. Гапоновичу, колишньому військовому судді.
