= Battle on Monastyryshche =

Battle of Monastyryshche
- Part of the Khmelnytsky Uprising
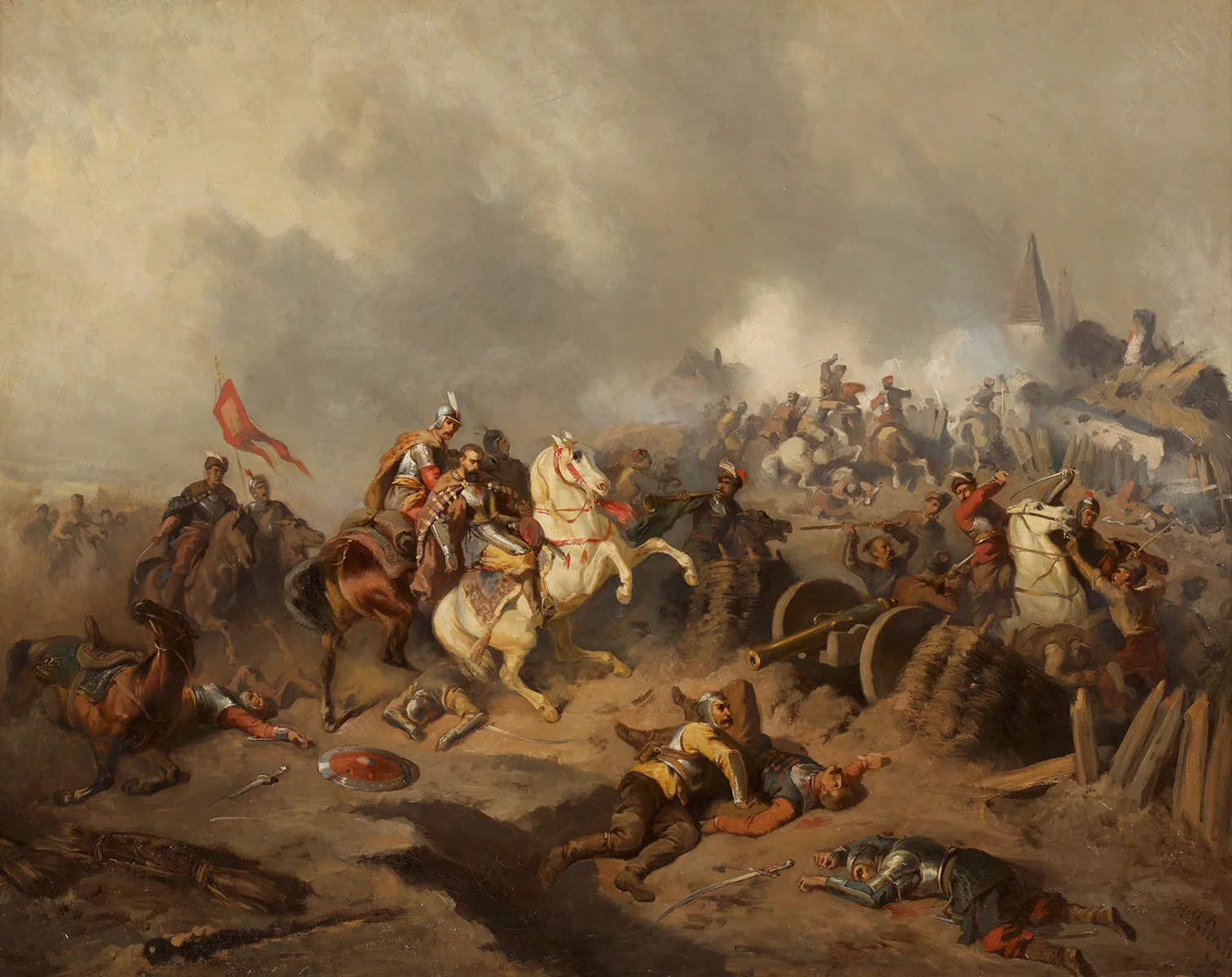
- Czarniecki durning battle
Date	20–21 March 1653
Location	Monastyryshche, Cossack Hetmanate
Result	Cossack victory

Belligerents
Cossack Hetmanate	Polish–Lithuanian Commonwealth

Commanders and leaders
Ivan Bohun	Stefan Czarniecki (WIA)

Strength
400 Cossacks local inhabitants and militia	20,000 soldiers 8,000 (polish claim).

Casualties and losses
Unknown	Unknown

Battle of Monastyryshche – was a battle during the Khmelnytsky Uprising, fought on March 20–21, 1653, near the town of Monastyryshche. A Cossack detachment led by Ivan Bohun managed to halt the advance of the Polish army led by Stefan Czarniecki, who had launched a new campaign against the Hetmanate.

In March 1653, the Polish corps of the Crown Train, the Kiev castellan Stefan Czarniecki, numbering 20,000 men (including servants), began an offensive against the Hetmanate along the so-called “Black Route”.

Czarniecki, employing the tactics of mobile cavalry units, advanced along the "Black Road" with an extremely rapid march from northeastern Volyn. The small Cossack fortresses of Samgorodok, Pogrebyshche, Pryluka, and Lipovets, as well as Cossack villages and farmsteads, were captured and burned. Colonel Ivan Bohun, commander of the Kalnitsky Regiment, managed to muster only 400 Cossacks and decided to block the enemy's advance toward Uman

== Battle ==
Bohun and his detachment took up defensive positions in Monastyryshche and fought off attacks by superior enemy forces for two days. When the Polish troops broke into the city suburbs, captured the ramparts, and began dismantling the palisade, Bohun resorted to ruse and ordered a hundred cavalrymen, dressed in sheepskin coats turned inside out, Tatar style, to attack the Polish supply train from the rear along the dam with shouts. He and the rest attacked from the other side. Confusion set in among the Polish soldiers, which, after Czernetsky received a serious wound to the face, escalated into panic. The Poles, thinking that the Tatar horde had come to the aid of the Cossacks, abandoned their supply train and fled from Monastyryshche in the direction of Lipovets.

The Cossacks pursued the fleeing enemy, and according to contemporaries, the entire road toward the town of Tsybulov, along which the Poles fled, was littered with the bodies of German mercenaries and Polish soldiers. At the same time, Hetman Bohdan Khmelnytsky himself was rushing from Uman with several regiments to aid Ivan Bohun, but he was too late. During the battle, Czarniecki was wounded, and the defeat forced the Poles to cease military operations for several days.
