= Battle of Lyubar =

1660 battle during the Russo-Polish War

Coordinates: 49.9141°N 27.5771°E

- Part of Russo-Polish War (1654–1667)
Date	14–27 September 1660
Location	Liubar, Ukraine
Result	Polish–Lithuanian victory

Belligerents
Polish–Lithuanian Commonwealth; Crimean Khanate	Cossack Hetmanate; Russian Tsardom

Commanders and leaders
(Polish–Lithuanian Commonwealth) Stanisław Potocki (Polish–Lithuanian Commonwealth) Jerzy Sebastian Lubomirski	Vasily Sheremetev; Tymofiej Cieciura

Strength
27,000	18,000

The Battle of Lyubar or battle of Lubar took place on 14–27 September 1660 near Lyubar, during the Russo-Polish War (1654–1667), between the forces of the Polish–Lithuanian Commonwealth (allied with the Tatars) and Tsardom of Russia (allied with the Cossacks). It was the first battle of the 1660 campaign in the south. It ended with a Polish victory. The Russian army retreated and was subsequently destroyed during the battle of Chudniv.

== Background ==
In July 1660, tsar Alexis I of Russia ordered Vasily Sheremetev to launch a campaign to take Lwów (Lviv) and Kraków, in an attempt to strike a decisive blow and force the Commonwealth to sue for peace. The tsarist government informed the Cossack Council of Officers at Vasylkiv of the campaign plans on 17 July 1660 (7 July O.S.). On 18 (8) August, Sheremetev's army departed from Kyiv, and joined forces with Tsytsura's Cossacks on the way.

In September 1660, the commander of the Russian army, Sheremetev, acting on misleading information that greatly underestimated the numerical strength of the Polish army decided to seek out and destroy the Polish forces with what he believed would be overwhelming strength (15,000 Russian soldiers and 15,000–35,000 of his Cossack allies). Sheremetev's major tactical error was to advance relying on outdated and sparse intelligence reports, and without adequate scouting. He expected only a weak army of 10,000 (in fact, it numbered only about 7,000) under Great Crown Hetman Stanisław "Rewera" Potocki and was unaware it was soon to be reinforced by about 12,000 men under Field Crown Hetman Jerzy Sebastian Lubomirski who recently defeated a Russian army in Lithuania.

The Polish commanders Hetmans Potocki and Lubomirski had much better intelligence (they were also aided by Ivan Vyhovsky spy network) and quickly became aware of Sheremetev's error. Polish historian Łossowski notes that "while Sheremetev's advanced blindly, the Polish hetmans knew almost everything about his army and moves". They decided to engage his forces before he could be reinforced by his Cossack allies. Part of the Cossacks (about 15,000 under Timofey Tsetsura (Pol: Tymofiej Cieciura)) were to stay with Sheremetev's corps, and another part (about 20,000 under Yurii Khmelnytsky), according to Sheremetev's plan were to intercept and defeat the 12,000 strong Tatars from the Crimean Khanate under nuradyn-sultan Safer Giray (of whose coming to Polish aid Sheremetev was aware). However, Khmelnytsky failed to stop the Tatars and most of the Tatar forces slipped past him around middle of August. Further, the Cossack's leader, Yurii Khmelnytsky, was increasingly at odds with Sheremetev (who favored Tsetsura over Khmelnytsky, and who refused to promise Khmelnytsky any loot from the upcoming battles), and was in no hurry to execute Sheremetev's orders or stick to his plan. The Tatars met Potocki's forces on 1 September, and they in turn met with Lubomirski on 7 September, while Khmelnytsky was still far from Sheremetev's army.

The combined Polish army (not counting 12,000 Tatars and 1,500 Cossacks under Vyhovsky) numbered about 27,000 (including about 700 Winged Hussars, 8,000 pancerni, 3500 light cavalry, 1,500 raitars, 5,000 dragoons, and 10,000 infantry). Sheremetev troops (not counting about 15,000 Cossacks under Tsetsura) numbered 18,000 (including 4500 Russian traditional cavalry, 5,500 raitars, 3,500 dragoons, 3,000 foreign infantry and 1,000 streltsy).

== Battle ==
The Russian army was surprised near Lyubar on 14 September and Sheremetev's vanguard was wiped out. Sheremetev, who had up until then failed to send out a single scouting party, suddenly realized what was to be an easy victory was a death trap and decided to take a defensive position in a fortified camp. The numerical superiority of the Polish forces, a lack of supplies and several minor defeats convinced him to break away on 26 September. At first the plan succeeded but the Polish forces caught up with the Russian army during its crossing of the Iber river and subsequently captured or destroyed a significant portion of the remaining Russian artillery and supplies.

== Aftermath ==
The Polish forces caught up again with the Russians on 27 September near Chudniv (Cudnów. At that point, the Russian and Cossack armies had lost about 1,000 troops and the Poles, about 100 (not counting the wounded). Sheremetev received a minor reinforcement by attaching Chudniv's garrison (about 1,000 troops) to his main army. However, with no further reinforcements, Sheremetev suffered a major defeat at the ensuing Battle of Chudniv.
