= Partition of Ukraine =

The Partition of Ukraine may refer to:

- The Ruin (1659–1686), during which the Cossack Hetmanate was partitioned between the Polish–Lithuanian Commonwealth, the Tsardom of Russia and the Ottoman Empire
- The Peace of Riga (1921), which split Ukraine between the Second Polish Republic and Ukrainian Soviet Socialist Republic
