= Siege of Uman (1655) =

Failed Polish–Lithuanian and Crimean siege in 1655 of Cossacks in Uman

- Part of the Khmelnytsky Uprising and Russo-Polish War (1654–1667)
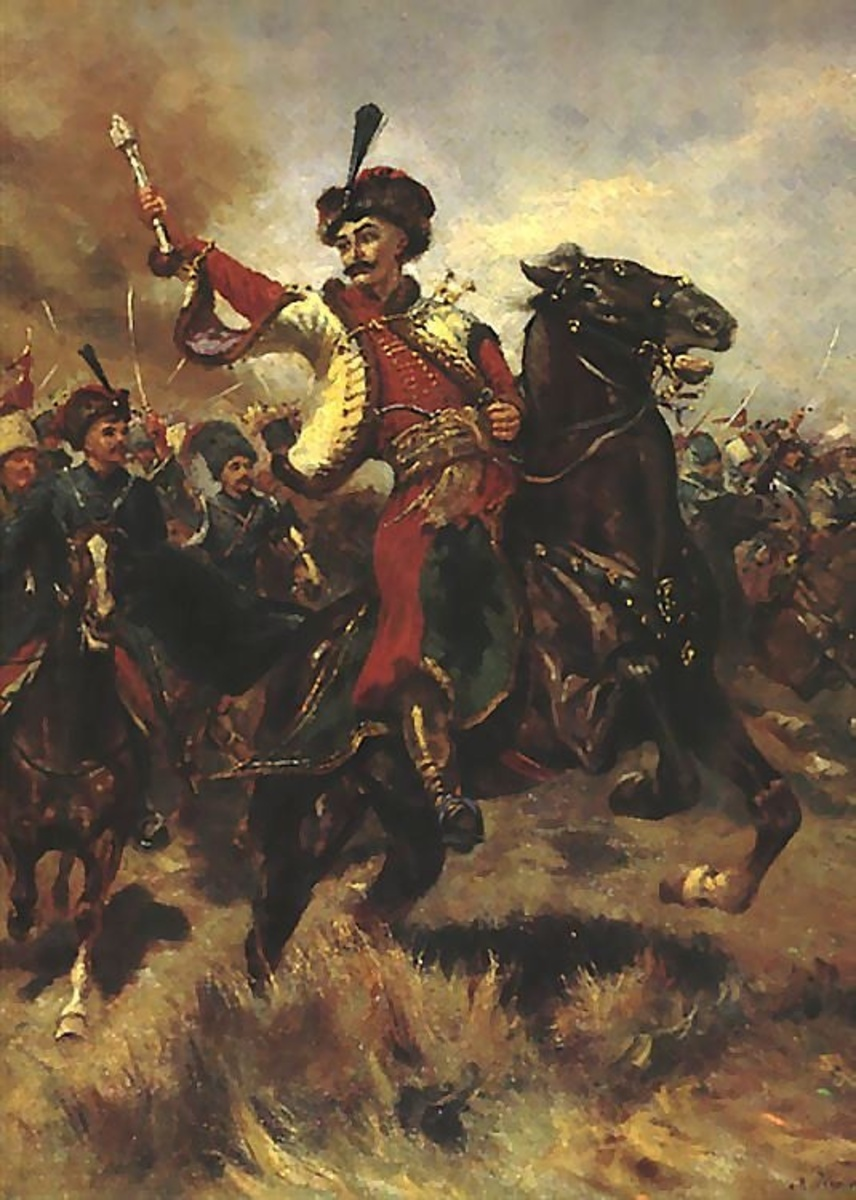
- Bohun at the crossing
Date	14–19 January 1655
Location	Uman, Right-Bank Ukraine
Result	Cossack victory

Belligerents
Cossack Hetmanate	Polish–Lithuanian Commonwealth; Crimean Khanate

Commanders and leaders
Ivan Bohun; Ivan Sirko; Joseph Glukh; M. Zelenski; M. Makharinsky; F. Ratz; S. Orgianenko (WIA)	Stefan Czarniecki; Stanisław Lanckoroński; Stanisław Potocki; Sokolinsky; Mehmed IV Giray; Murza Kamambet; Murza Akhmet

Strength
Total: 42,000; 12,000 Cossacks; 30,000 Residents of city	Total: 58,000; 28,000 (Note: 20,000 cavalry 8,000 infantry); 30,000

Casualties and losses
Heavy	Heavy; 8,000+ killed; 2,050+ captured

The siege of Uman was conducted by the Polish–Lithuanian–Crimean forces as part of the renewed campaign against the Cossack Hetmanate, on 14–19 January 1655.

== Prelude ==
On 2 December 1654, Sheremetev gathered his army and headed to Right-Bank Ukraine, where he joined with Khmelnytsky's army. During this time, Polish–Lithuanian troops pacified Bratslav and massacred civilians in Demkovka. In January 1655, Polish–Lithuanian army was joined by the Crimean troops of Murza Kamambet and they launched an offensive towards Uman. This army consisted of 28,000 Polish–Lithuanian and 30,000 Crimean Tatar troops. Uman was defended by 12,000 Zaporozhian Cossacks and 30,000 militiamen. Polish–Lithuanian forces made initial attempts to capture Uman in early April 1654, which ended in failure.

== Siege ==
The first attacks on Uman were launched by the Polish-Lithuanian troops of Stefan Czarniecki and Sokolinsky, but these attacks were repulsed. With the arrival of Polish–Lithuanian troops of Stanisław Potocki, allied Crimean troops led by Murzas Kamambet and Akhmet, Polish–Lithuanian–Crimean army captured many settlements and now begun assaulting Uman. The Cossacks of Uman refused to surrender, which led to intensified attacks. Uman was shelled numerous times which heavily damaged the city. Poles and Tatars achieved partial success in their attacks, but their other assaults were repelled and they were unable to advance further. The besieged managed to hold out until the arrival of Cossack-Russian troops led by Sheremetev and Khmelnytsky. The besieged Cossacks took advantage of this, forcing Poles and Tatars to retreat. Cossacks later intercepted Tatars passing near Uman and other settlements, killing or capturing 10,050 Tatar troops.

== Aftermath ==
The Polish–Lithuanian–Crimean army failed to capture Uman and their attacks were repelled. Poles and Tatars retreated with the Cossack-Russian forces pursuing them, which led to Battle of Okhmativ. Failed attacks on Uman degraded the Polish–Lithuanian army. After this event, some chroniclers later begun comparing the defense of Uman in 1655 to defense of Breda by the Dutch garrison against the numerically superior Spanish army in 1624–1625.

== See also ==
- Siege of Uman (1654)
- Battle of Okhmativ (1655)
