= Battle of Chudniv =

1660 battle during Russo-Polish War

Coordinates: 50.0600°N 28.1800°E

Battle of Chudniv (Cudnów)
- Part of the Russo-Polish War (1654–1667)
- The Russian army and tsarist Cossacks at Chudniv, surrounded on all sides by Polish Commonwealth forces, Crimean Tatars and Vyhovsky's loyalist Cossacks. Engraving by François Collignon (died 1687), in the Royal Collection.
Date	27 September (O.S. 17 September) – 4 November (O.S. 25 October) 1660
Location	Chudniv, (Note: Ukrainian: Чуднів, romanized: Chudniv. Polish: Cudnów. Russian: Чуднов, romanized: Chudnov.) Ukraine
Result	Commonwealth victory

Belligerents
Polish–Lithuanian Commonwealth; Crimean Khanate; Cossack Hetmanate	(Tsardom of Russia) Russian Tsardom; Cossack Hetmanate

Commanders and leaders
(Polish–Lithuanian Commonwealth) Stanisław Potocki (Polish–Lithuanian Commonwealth) Jerzy Sebastian Lubomirski; Safer Giray; Ivan Vyhovsky	(Tsardom of Russia) Vasily Sheremetev (surrendered); Tymish Tsytsiura (surrendered)

Strength
28,000 Poles with 20 artillery pieces (Note: Numerical estimates are based on the 1995 work of Łukasz Ossoliński; in particular his Chapter 3 dedicated to estimating the strength of opposing forces. He notes that older historiography often overestimated the numbers for that battle (for example, a common mistake in Polish historiography was to estimate Russian forces at 50,000).); 12,000 Tatars	15,000 Russians with 48 artillery pieces 15,000 Cossacks with several artillery pieces (under Tsytsiura; not counting 20,000 under Khmelnytsky)

Casualties and losses
Poles: 2,700 dead, 2,500 wounded Tatars: 400 dead, 600 wounded	Russians: 2,300 dead, 2,000 wounded, 12,500 captive and all artillery Cossacks: 1,900 dead, 2,000 wounded, 8,000 captives (not counting Khmelnytsky casualties)

The Battle of Chudniv took place from 27 September (O.S. 17 September) to 4 November (O.S. 25 October) 1660 during the Russo-Polish War (1654–1667), between the forces of the Polish–Lithuanian Commonwealth, allied with the Crimean Tatars and 1,500 Cossacks under Ivan Vyhovsky, and the Tsardom of Russia, allied with 15,000 other Cossacks under Tymish Tsytsiura. It ended with a decisive Commonwealth victory, and the treaty of Chudniv. The entire Russian army, including its commander, was taken into jasyr slavery by the Tatars.

The wider military campaign from August to October 1660 is known as the Chudniv campaign. Yurii Khmelnytsky, who had been coerced by Aleksey Trubetskoy's army into an alliance with the Tsar in October 1659, remained mostly passive during the campaign, deciding not to aid the Muscovites under Sheremetev, and to return to the Commonwealth side when the circumstances were favourable, with the Cossacks under his command.

== Background ==
=== Preparations ===
In July 1660, tsar Alexis I of Russia ordered Vasily Sheremetev to launch a campaign to take Lwów (Lviv) and Kraków, in an attempt to strike a decisive blow and force the Commonwealth to sue for peace. The tsarist government informed the Cossack Council of Officers at Vasylkiv of the campaign plans on 17 July 1660 (7 July O.S.). On 18 (8) August, Sheremetev's army departed from Kyiv, and joined forces with Tsytsura's Cossacks on the way.

The combined Polish army (not counting 12,000 Tatars and 1,500 Cossacks under Vyhovsky) numbered about 27,000 (including about 700 Winged Hussars, 8,000 pancerni, 3,500 light cavalry, 1,500 raitars, 5,000 dragoons, and 10,000 infantry). Sheremetev's troops (not counting Cossacks) numbered 18,000 (including 4,500 Russian traditional cavalry, 5,500 raitars, 3,500 dragoons, 3,000 foreign infantry and 1,000 streltsy).

=== Battle of Lyubar (14–25 September) ===
In September 1660, the commander of the Russian army, Sheremetev – acting on misleading information greatly underestimating the numerical strength of the Polish army – decided to seek out and destroy the Polish forces with what he believed would be overwhelming strength (15,000 Russian soldiers and 15,000–35,000 of his Cossack allies). Sheremetev's major tactical error was to advance relying on outdated and sparse intelligence reports, and without adequate scouting; he expected only a weak army of 10,000 (in fact, it numbered only about 7,000) under Great Crown Hetman Stanisław "Rewera" Potocki, and was unaware it was soon to be reinforced by about 12,000 men under Field Crown Hetman Jerzy Sebastian Lubomirski who had recently defeated Russian army in Lithuania.

The Polish commanders – hetmans Potocki and Lubomirski – had much better intelligence (they were also aided by Ivan Vyhovsky's spy network), and became quickly aware of Sheremetev's error. Polish historian Łossowski notes that "while Shermetev's advanced blindly, Polish hetmans knew almost everything about his army and moves". The Poles decided to engage Shermetev's forces before he in turn would be reinforced by his Cossack allies. A portion of the Cossacks (about 15,000 under Tsytsiura were to stay with Sheremetev's corps, and another part (about 20,000 under Yurii Khmelnytsky), according to Sheremetev's plan, were to intercept and defeat the 12,000-strong Tatars from the Crimean Khanate under nuradyn-sultan Safer Giray (of whose coming to Polish aid Sheremetev was aware) – but Khmelnytsky failed to do so, with most of the Tatar forces slipping past them around middle of August. Further, Cossack's leader, Yurii Khmelnytsky, was increasingly at odds with Sheremetev (who favored Tsytsiura over Khmelnytsky, and who refused to promise Khmelnytsky any loot from the upcoming battles), and was in no hurry to execute his orders or stick to his plan. The Tatars met Potocki's forces on 1 September, and they in turn met with Lubomirski on 7 September, while Khmelnytsky were still far from Shermetev's army.

On 14 (4) September, the Russian army was surprised near Liubar, leading to the Battle of Lyubar. Shermetev's vanguard was wiped out, and Sheremetev – who until then had failed to send a single scouting party and suddenly realized what was to be an easy victory was a death trap – decided to take defensive positions in a fortified camp. The Muscovite army was blocked, and on 16 (6) September, there was a battle with the main Commonwealth army.

=== Battle of Kutyszcze (26 September) ===
Numerical superiority of the Polish forces, lack of supplies and several minor defeats convinced him to break away on 26 (16) September, and join up with the army of Yurii Khmelnytsky in the formation of a Wagenburg. The plan succeeded at first, but Polish forces caught the Russian army during its crossing of a swamp (or "the muddy river Ibr", a tributary of the Teteriv), and captured or destroyed a significant portion of the remaining Russian artillery and supplies: one third of the Russian camp.

== Battle of Chudniv ==
=== Early hostilities (27 September – 5 October) ===
The next day, on 27 (17) September, the Polish forces caught up again with the Russians, who had encamped on the banks of the Teteriv near Chudniv. The Commonwealth forces were blocking the Russian army. At that point, the Russian and Cossack armies had lost about 1,000 troops, and the Poles about 100 (not counting the wounded). Sheremetev also received a minor reinforcement by attaching Chudniv's garrison (about 1,000 troops) to his main army.

Sheremetev decided to stop the Poles by repeating his previous tactics. He burned the town on the side the Poles were approaching from, and created a new camp on the other side of the river. The Poles took the other bank, including the local fort, which Sheremetev abandoned, and which provided them with a useful stronghold and observation point. The Tatars drove the Russians foraging parties into their main camp, but for now no major encounters took place. The Poles were however able to surround the Russian camp, and started engineering works designed to flood their camp.

=== Cossacks at Slobodyshche blocked, failed outbreaks Sheremetev (6–14 October) ===
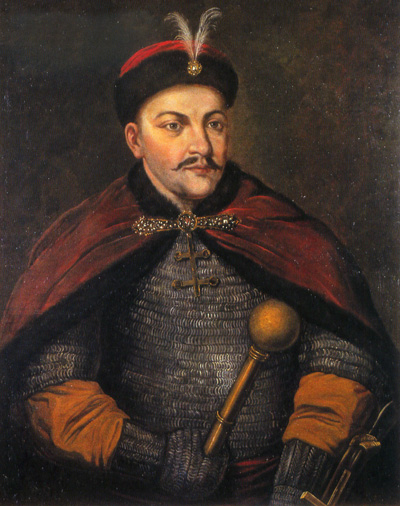
Yurii Khmelnytsky and his Cossacks, who had been forced to submit to Russia in October 1659, switched their allegiance back to the Commonwealth.

On 6 October (26 September), the Poles learned that a Cossack army under Khmelnytsky numbering over 20,000 was approaching the area; he was a day's march away from Chudniv. To prevent it from combining forces with the Russians, the Poles split an 8,000-strong force under Lubomirski, which stopped the Cossacks near Slobodyshche (Polish: Słobodyszcze, in modern Berdychiv Raion). The battle of Slobodyshche took place around 7 October and 8 October; however, some historians speculate that there was never any battle of Slobodyshche, and it was a misidentification created by Khmelnytsky and Polish commanders (Khmelnytsky did not want to aid Sheremetev, and Poles were able to concentrate on that task); there is however no consensus on that variant.

On 8 October (28 September), facing hunger, flooding and low morale, Sheremetev tried to break out of the camp, but was defeated. Another attempt on 13–14 October (3–4 October), initially more successful, proved to be futile as well, and only succeeded in moving the camp to a non-flooded area.

=== Cossacks return to the Commonwealth (15–21 October) ===
In the meantime, Khmelnytsky (also suffering from heavy desertions) decided to enter negotiations with the Poles. The Treaty of Cudnów was signed on 17 October (7 October O.S.), and mostly repeated the 1657 Treaty of Hadiach (although the creation of the Grand Duchy of Ruthenia had to be confirmed by the Polish king), and confirmed the Cossacks' allegiance to the Commonwealth. Having learned that Khmelnytsky signed the treaty with the Poles, Tsytsiura decided to defect as well, and did so on 21 October (however, his Cossacks were ambushed by the Tatars and suffered heavy casualties). The Cossacks were no longer allied with the Russians.

=== Russian defeat and capitulation (22 October – 4 November) ===
One Russian army was defeated in the north in the Battle of Połonka (29 June 1660), and another one tied up in Kyiv, where they suspected a Polish-Cossack uprising may occur. Russian commander Yury Baryatinsky in Kyiv was able to muster only about 5,000-strong army, but retreated to Kyiv having learned that Polish reinforcements (numbering about few thousands and led by Stefan Czarniecki and Jakub Potocki) were approaching. Abandoned by his allies, and failing to break through the Polish lines on 22 October, Sheremetev decided to enter negotiations on 23 October. On 26 (16) October, Sheremetev requested a truce, and he capitulated on 2–4 November (23–25 October). The Russians were allowed to retreat but had to leave their weapons, abandon Kyiv, Pereiaslav and Chernihiv and pay 300,000 talars. Sheremetev and several of his officers were to remain Polish prisoners. All Muscovite soldiers had to withdraw from Ukraine; however, this obligation was not carried out.

The remaining Cossacks (numbering around 8,000), abandoned by Tsytsiura and Khmelnytsky, left the Russian camp on 3 November, but were ambushed by the Tatars; surrounded and with no help from their former Russian allies, nearly all were taken captive (see jasyr). The Tatars were however unhappy with the little loot they had captured, but even more with the capitulation – they wanted the Poles, Cossacks and the Russians to fight among themselves as much as possible (since they were all Christian enemies of Islam); and attacked the Russian camp after they surrendered, on the night of 4 November and 5 November. After a short skirmish with the Poles, in which over 70 Poles died, the latter decided to allow the Tatars to take what they wanted; and even Sheremetev himself was transferred by Poles to the Tatars (he never returned to Russia, and died in 1682 still their captive, although a Cossack army managed to intercept part of the Tatars and take back several thousand captives later).

== Aftermath ==
The battle was a major victory for the Commonwealth forces, who succeeded in eliminating most of Russian forces, kept their alliance with the Crimean Tatars, and managed to convince thousands of Cossacks to confirm their allegiance to the Commonwealth. The Poles, however, were unable to capitalize on that victory; their army retreated in poor order (there was little aid for the wounded, which accounted for hundreds of deaths after the battle). Furthermore, the country had failed to provide wages for most of the army, which resulted in mutinies in 1661. This prevented the Poles from taking initiative and allowed the Russians time to rebuild their armies.

Yury Baryatinsky who commanded the Russian garrison in Kyiv refused to follow Sheremetev's agreement with the Poles and leave the city, saying his famous phrase "I obey only His Majesty, not Sheremetev. There are many Sheremetevs in Moscow!" The Poles did not risk attacking the city which thus remained in Russian hands. A similar development took place in Pereiaslav whose inhabitants led by Yakym Somko swore "to die for the great Tsar, for God's churches and Orthodox faith".

The Battle of Chudniv is commemorated on the Tomb of the Unknown Soldier, Warsaw, with the inscription "CUDNOW 14 IX-3 X 1660". Ossoliński (1995) considered the battle the largest and most important Polish victory over the Russian forces until the battle of Warsaw in 1920. Halushka (2013) wrote: "The Capitulation of Chudniv was the greatest Russian defeat in the Russo-Polish War of 1654–67."

Serhii Plokhy (2022) commented that through Chudniv, Khmelnytsky and his Cossacks had finally gotten revenge for how the Russians had coerced them to submit to the tsar in October 1659, and inflicted further violence and humiliation upon them ever since. On the other hand, 'while this Polish victory gratified the Cossacks, it did nothing to secure the Hetmanate', as promise of an autonomous Grand Principality of Ruthenia within the Commonwealth was put on hold, and the Left-bank Cossack regiments remained controlled by Moscow, thereby splitting Ukraine in two along the Dnipro.

== See also ==
- The Ruin (Ukrainian history)
