= Siege of Uman (1654) =

- Part of the Khmelnytsky Uprising
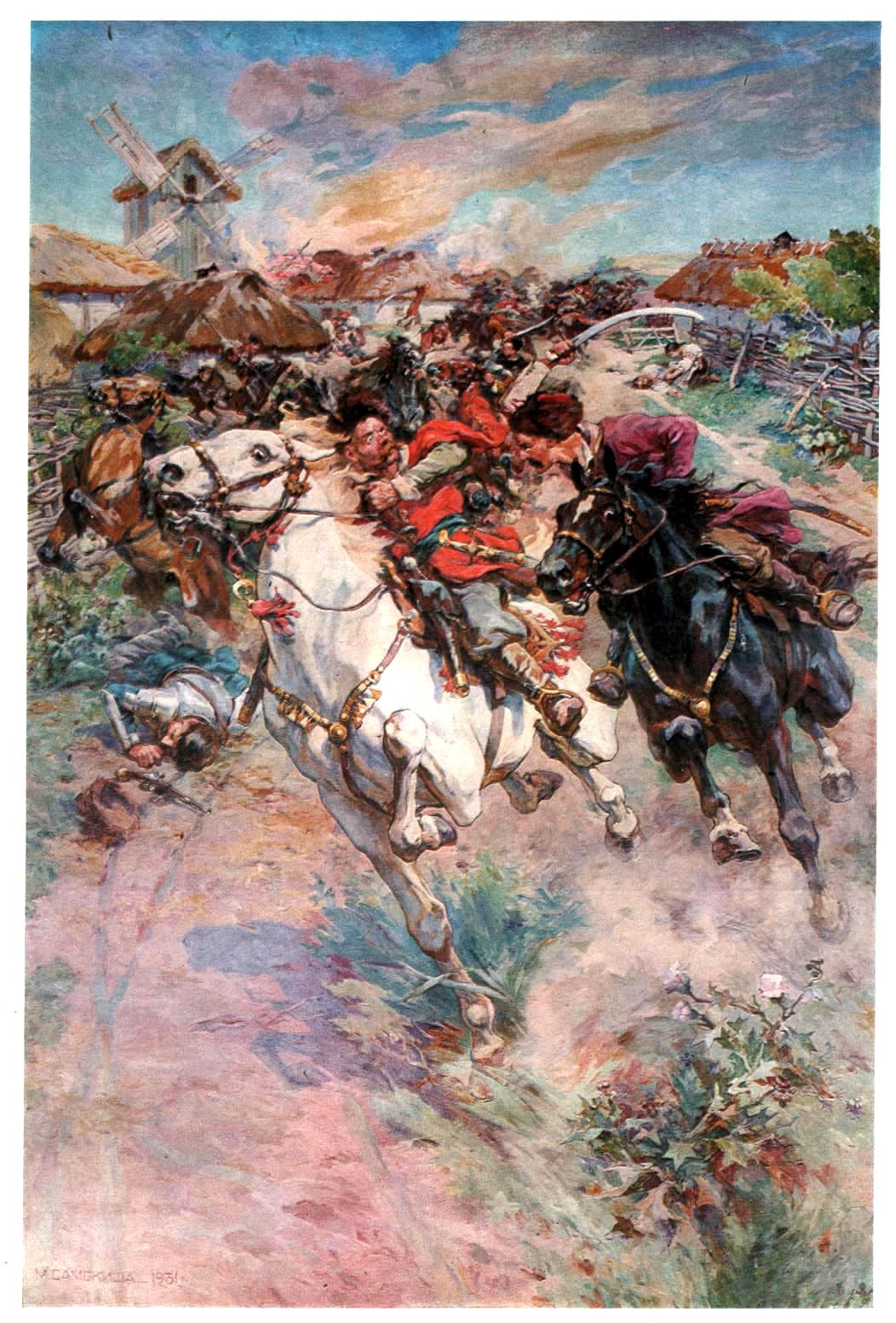
- Battle between Ivan Bohun and Stefan Czarniecki
Date	2–4 April 1654
Location	Uman, Right-Bank Ukraine
Result	Cossack victory

Belligerents
Cossack Hetmanate	Polish–Lithuanian Commonwealth; Crimean Khanate

Commanders and leaders
Ivan Bohun; Ivan Sirko; Joseph Glukh	Stefan Czarniecki; Stanisław Lanckoroński; Stanisław Potocki; Piotr Potocki; Mehmed IV Giray; Sefre Kazi-aga

Strength
Unknown	8,000+ Unknown

The siege of Uman was conducted the Polish–Lithuanian–Crimean forces against the Cossack garrison of Uman, on 2–4 April 1654.

== Prelude ==
In March, 1654, Polish–Lithuanian forces conducted offensive actions in Bratslav and Vinnytsia. This was done at the request of John II Casimir who believed in importance of securing these regions. On March 22, Stanisław and Piotr Potocki joined their forces, which now consisted of 8,000 troops. Ivan Bohun retreated from Vinnytsia to Uman where he was pursued to by the Polish–Lithuanian forces.

== Siege ==
On April 2, Polish–Lithuanian forces besieged Uman, where Bohun organised a defense. Polish–Lithuanian forces viewed Uman as the "nest of rebellion" which they sought to eliminate in order to acquire full control. Polish–Lithuanian forces attempted to lure Bohun and his Cossacks out of the fortress in order to "negotiate" with them, but they ignored this request. Potockis and Czarniecki were unable to use trickery in their favour. Poles assaulted the city and heavily damaged it. Nonetheless, all Polish–Lithuanian attacks were repelled after heavy fighting and Uman remained in Cossack hands. On April 4, Polish–Lithuanian army lifted the siege and retreated after the news of incoming Cossack reinforcements.

== Aftermath ==
Bohun organised a successful defense of Uman. Bohun, Sirko and Glukh repelled all Polish–Tatar attacks on Uman. Polish–Lithuanian army burnt up to 20 cities and towns during their campaign. Polish–Lithuanian troops massacred civilians in Nemyriv. The campaign revealed the hostility of local population towards Poland–Lithuania. In January 1655, Polish–Lithuanian–Crimean forces launched another assault on Uman.

== See also ==
- Siege of Uman (1655)
- Battle of Okhmativ (1655)
