= Pereiaslav Articles of 1659 =

1659 treaty between Russia and Cossacks

The Pereiaslav Articles of 1659 (Ukrainian: Переяславські статті 1659, romanized: Pereiaslavski statti 1659, Russian: Переяславские статьи, romanized: Pereyaslavskiye stati) were concluded on 27 October 1659 between Yurii Khmelnytsky, the son of Bohdan Khmelnytsky, and Aleksey Trubetskoy on behalf of the Russian tsardom.

There are two versions of the Pereiaslav Articles of 1659.

- The original provisions, drafted by the Ukrainian diplomats of Yurii Khmelnytsky,
  - repeated the 1654 Pereiaslav Agreement, and
  - added the so-called Zherdivski Articles (or Zherdev Articles). This was a set of clarifications and additions aimed at strengthening of the guarantees of the independence and sovereignty of the Ukrainian lands.
- The revised articles written by the Muscovite boyar Aleksey Trubetskoy, who rejected the Zherdivski Articles, and forced the Ukrainian Cossacks to accept
  - 14 so-called Old Articles of 1654 (which was in fact a falsification of the 1654 Pereiaslav Agreement), and
  - 18 so-called New Articles, which significantly curtailed the sovereign rights of the Cossack Hetmanate.

After thus being betrayed and forced into becoming subordinates rather than equal allies by Trubetskoy, and being humiliated by the Muscovites and tsar Alexis, Yurii's Cossacks decided to switch sides back to the Polish–Lithuanian Commonwealth again in less than a year, by the Treaty of Chudniv/Slobodyshche (17 October 1660).

== Background ==
Yurii's Cossacks originally drafted the Pereiaslav Articles as a reaction to the Treaty of Hadiach, concluded on 16 September 1658 between Hetman Ivan Vyhovsky's Cossacks and the Polish–Lithuanian Commonwealth, which granted many privileges to Cossacks and thus threatened Russian influence over them. Moreover, the Sejm of the Commonwealth amended the text of the treaty (without Cossack consent) and ratified this version on 22 May 1659. Vyhovsky was very unhappy with this revised version. The revised text compelled the Cossack Hetmanate to annul its 1654 alliance with Muscovy. Moscow took this as a pretext to resume the war, and once again invaded Ukraine. Tsar Alexis of Russia called Vyhovsky a "traitor", and urged the Cossacks to rebel against him, which some did, especially Zaporizhians in southern Ukraine. Vyhovsky countered that the tsar had violated the Pereiaslav Agreement and was encroaching onf the rights and freedoms of the Cossacks. Although Vyhovsky's coalition initially managed to repel the Muscovites led by Trubetskoy and Yurii's Cossacks at the Battle of Konotop on 29 June 1659, this initial victory was followed by a string of battlefield setbacks and revolts against Vyhovsky. Although Vyhovsky won every battle he personally fought in, he lost the political debate, had to resign as hetman and flee to Poland in October 1659.

Yurii's Cossacks now sought a confirmation of the 1654 Pereiaslav Agreement, but with more guarantees for Ukraine's sovereignty and independence. However, Yurii Khmelnytsky and his Cossack forces were surrounded at Pereiaslav by an army of 40,000 Muscovite soldiers led by Trubetskoy, who took advantage of Yury's weak military position to enforce a much more unfavourable deal upon the Cossacks than the text they had drafted.

== Terms ==
Under the New Articles, the Cossacks Hetmanate were not allowed to conduct any foreign policy, including military alliances. The Cossack hetman were not allowed to declare war without the approval of the Tsar, nor to send ambassadors abroad, or receive foreign ambassadors at home, to conclude international treaties, or to provide military assistance to other states without the tsar's permission.

In addition, the Cossacks could no longer elect their own hetmans or colonels without the approval of the Tsar. More specifically, New Articles prohibited the re-election of the hetman because of various offences against the Zaporizhian Host (apart from ‘treason’ against the Tsar) without a prior investigation conducted by the Russian side, as well as a corresponding order from the Tsar. Moreover, the hetman himself lost the discretion to appoint or dismiss general starshyna (senior officers) and colonels; they all had to swear allegiance to the tsar of Muscovy. Any Cossack officers who sought to separate Ukraine from Muscovy would henceforth receive the death penalty.

Under the treaty, Russian military governors and garrisons were placed in Bratslav, Chernihiv, Nizhyn, Pereiaslav, and Uman (previously, they had been only in Kiev since 1654). Cossack forces were also withdrawn from Belarus; inhabitants of Belarus were no longer allowed to call themselves "Cossacks" either. In effect, the 1654 treaty had established a confederation between Ukraine and Muscovy, but the 1659 New Articles of Trubetskoy turned it into a federation, whereby Ukraine lost its independence and became an autonomous entity within the Russian state.

== Aftermath ==
The most significant immediate consequence of the Accords was the separation of the Ukrainian Orthodox Church from the Patriarch of Constantinople and its subordination to the Patriarch of Moscow. The treaty led to popular unrest and later influenced Khmelnytsky's decision to ally with Poland on 27 October 1660.

Instead of strengthening the position of the Cossacks, the Pereiaslav Articles of 1659 weakened them. By switching allegiance from Poland to Russia, the Ukrainian Hetmanate lost several rights and privileges which the Commonwealth had been willing to grant the Cossacks.

Danylo Vyhovsky, brother of Ivan Vyhovsky and cousin of Yury Khmelnytsky, had been taken prisoner during a failed Cossack attack on the Muscovite garrison in Kyiv. The Muscovites tortured Danylo to death, and in January 1660, the Muscovite voivodes sent his maimed corpse to Yurii Khmelnytsky to intimidate him into obeying the tsar. Khmelnytsky broke down in tears, while his Cossack court was outraged at this humiliation. The Muscovites frequently and openly insulted Yurii Khmelnytsky in other ways as well. Muscovite commander Vasily Borisovich Sheremetev, who held the Chudniv campaign together with Khmelnytsky's Cossacks in 1660, called him "a petty would-be hetman [getmanishka] who should tend geese, not play the hetman." The Velychko Chronicle also argued that in addition to Sheremetev's insult, Khmelnytsky was also pressured by Cossack colonels and officers to switch back his allegiance to the Commonwealth over Moscow's unilateral removal of the Cossack garrisons from Belarus, especially Stary Bykhaw, which under Khmelnytsky senior's version of the Pereiaslav Agreement had been guaranteed as a Cossack Hetmanate city.

During or around the time of the Battle of Chudniv or Battle of Slobodyshche, Khmelnytsky's Cossacks switched sides and reaffirmed their allegiance to the Polish king, helping the combined Polish, Crimean Tatar and now Cossack forces emerge victorious over the Muscovites. The new Treaty of Chudniv or Slobodyshche (17 October 1660), concluded in the aftermath, nullified the Pereiaslav Articles of 1659, and restored some but not all of the rights and privileges the Ukrainians had enjoyed under the Union of Hadiach.

== See also ==
- Treaty of Pereiaslav (1630)
- Pereiaslav Agreement (1654)
- Union of Hadiach (1658–1659)
- Treaty of Chudniv (1660)
- The Ruin (Ukrainian history)

== Bibliography ==
- Basarab, John (1982). Pereiaslav 1654: A Historiographical Study. Edmonton: Canadian Institute of Ukrainian Studies. Archived from the original on 7 March 2019.
- Horobets, Viktor Mykolayovych (2011). "Переяславські статті 1659" [Pereiaslav Articles 1659]. Encyclopedia of History of Ukraine (in Ukrainian). Vol. 8. Kyiv: Institute of History of Ukraine. p. 147. Archived from the original on 7 September 2026.
- Plokhy, Serhii (2022). The Gates of Europe: A History of Ukraine. New York, NY: Basic Books. p. 414. ISBN 978-0-465-07394-8.
- Zhukovsky, Arkadii (1993). "Pereiaslav Articles of 1659". Encyclopedia of Ukraine. Vol. 3. Canadian Institute of Ukrainian Studies.
- Wójcik, Zbigniew. Traktat Andruszowski 1667 i jego geneza [The Andrusovo treaty 1667 and its genesis] (PDF) (in Polish). Warszawa: Państwowe Wydawnictwo Naukowe. p. 286. With a five-page summary in English at pp. 276–280.
