= Moscow Articles of 1665 =

The Moscow Articles of 1665 was an agreement signed on 11 October 1665 between the Cossack Hetmanate Hetman Ivan Briukhovetsky and the Tsardom of Russia.

The treaty put Left-Bank Ukraine under the control of the Russian Tsar. The terms of the agreements were:

- Russian military governors were to take control of all military, administrative, and fiscal power
- Increased number of troops in Ukraine, and the obligation to feed and maintain them
- Garrisons in all major towns: Chernihiv, Pereiaslav, Nizhyn, Poltava, Kremenchuk, Novhorod-Siverskyi, Oster, Kyiv, Kaniv, and Kodak
- Taxes collected and put in the Tsar's treasury
- The Metropolis of Kyiv was made subordinate to the Patriarch of Moscow

This agreement was largely viewed in Ukraine unfavorably as treason and caused massive uproar.
