= Treaty of Korsun =

Treaty between the Cossack Hetmanate and Sweden

- Original treaty text in the National Archives of Sweden (click for full PDF).
- Type: Alliance and military association treaty
- Signed: 16 October 1657 (O.S. 6 October 1657 (Note: die sexta Mensis Octobris Veteri styllo Anno Millesimo Sexcentesimo quinquagesimo septimo, "on the sixth day of the Month of October Old Style in the Year 1657".))
- Location: Korsun
- Parties: Swedish Empire; Cossack Hetmanate

The Treaty of Korsun was a treaty signed between the Cossack Hetmanate and Sweden on 16 October 1657 (O.S. 6 October 1657). In the treaty, the Hetmanate was formally recognized by Sweden.

== Stipulations ==
- The Cossack Hetmanate is formally recognized by Sweden
- Sweden promises the formation of an independent Cossack state which would include Galicia, Volhynia, and eastern Ukrainian territory
- Charles X Gustav pledges that Poland will recognize the Hetmanate
- Charles X Gustav accepts the Hetmanate as under his control
- Charles X Gustav promises to defend the freedom and interests of the Ukrainian people

== Aftermath ==
As a result of the treaty, many elite Cossacks attempted to weaken their ties to the Commonwealth, resolve regional tensions, and create a brand new geopolitical formation.
