= Treaty of Chudniv =

1660 treaty between Poland–Lithuania and Cossacks

Fulltext of the Treaty of Chudniv

The Treaty of Chudniv, Chudnov, (Note: Ukrainian: Чуднівський трактат, romanized: Chudnivskyj traktat, or Ukrainian: Чуднівський договір, romanized: Chudnivskyj dohovir.) Cudnów, (Note: Polish: Ugoda cudnowska.) or Treaty of Slobodyshche (Note: Ukrainian: Слободищенський трактат, romanized: Slobodyshchenskyi traktat.) is a treaty between the Polish–Lithuanian Commonwealth and the Cossack Hetmanate, signed in Chudniv (Note: Polish: Cudnów.) on 17 October 1660 (Note: The Encyclopedia of Ukraine, volume 4 (1993) incorrectly reports the signing date as "27 October 1660". The treaty text itself states "dnia 17go Octobris 1660", meaning "on the 17th day of October 1660" according to the Gregorian calendar used in the Commonwealth; the Julian calendar date was thus 7 October 1660.) (O.S. 7 October 1660) during the Khmelnytsky Uprising. It restored most of the provisions of the Treaty of Hadiach, except for the elevation of Ruthenia to the status equal to Poland and Lithuania. It invalidated the Pereiaslav Articles, which were often considered unfavorable for Ukraine, severed the union with the Tsardom of Russia and restored Ukraine's state ties with the Polish–Lithuanian Commonwealth. Although the Ukrainian government insisted on the full restoration of the Treaty of Hadiach of 1658, the side of the Polish–Lithuanian Commonwealth, represented by Stanisław Potocki and Jerzy Sebastian Lubomirski, did not agree to the restitution of the Grand Duchy of Ruthenia, leaving other points of the Treaty of Hadiach in force.

The treaty was signed following the Polish victory at the Battle of Chudniv. The treaty meant that the Cossacks withdrew their support from Russia in the Russo–Polish War (1654–67), and transferred it back to the Commonwealth.

The Hetmanate regained some autonomy, switched its allegiance back to the Commonwealth, and once more abandoned Muscovy. A Cossack council in Korsun-Shevchenkivskyi in Right-Bank Ukraine ratified the treaty, but the Left-Bank regiments led by Yakym Somko and Vasyl Zolotarenko continued their allegiance to Muscovy, thereby effectively splitting Ukraine along the Dnipro.

The war would eventually be concluded with the 1667 Treaty of Andrusovo.

== Terms ==
The Treaty of Chudniv contained the following main points:

I	The representers of the Polish–Lithuanian Commonwealth Potocki and Lubomirski must confirm with their oath the Treaty of Hadiach. Regarding the points that concern the Grand Principality of Ruthenia, the Hetman was required to transfer the matter in the hands of the King for the time being.
II	Yurii Khmelnytsky with the Ukrainian Cossack army retreats from the Tsar of Russia and should not look for a patron other than the King of the Polish–Lithuanian Commonwealth.
III	The hetman with the army returns to Ukraine to take back the fortresses that are under the control of Russia.
IV	The Pereiaslav colonel Tymish Tsytsiura is forgiven for his crimes. He undertakes to return the weapon against the Russians and prove his loyalty to the king.
V	The Nizhyn and Chernihiv regiments are ordered to retreat from the Russians, otherwise Khmelnytsky must oppose them.
VI	In case of a rebellion in the Cossack Hetmanate or in other localities, the hetman must suppress it.
VII	The possessions of the Crimean Khanate should not be attacked by the Cossacks as long as the friendship between the khan and the king of the Commonwealth continues.
VIII	Not only the hetman, but also the common people must swear to the king before the sent commissioners.

=== Grand Principality of Ruthenia ===
Komissią hadziecką tak jak śię w sobie zawiera, Ichmść PP. Hetmani przysięgą swą potwierdzić mają. Te zaś punkta które do Xięztwa ruskiego w niéj należą, że się i wolnościom wojska zaporozkiego J. K. Mci mniéj potrzebne znajdują, i pokoju wiecznego stałości (którego sobie zobopólnie od Pana Boga szczerze życzemy) mniej służące są, poprzysięga JP. Hetman zaporozki wzajemnie iż przez Półkowników swoich do J. K. Mcі odeśle i ono łaskawéj ojcowskiéj ręce podda.
"The Hadiach Commission, as it stands, is to be confirmed by an oath taken by His Excellency the Hetman. As for those provisions therein which pertain to the Ruthenian Principality, in that they are deemed less necessary to His Majesty's freedoms regarding the Zaporizhian Host, and are less conducive to the permanence of everlasting peace (which we both sincerely pray to God for), His Excellency the Zaporizhian Hetman swears that he shall, in turn, send them to His Royal Majesty through his colonels and submit them to his gracious, fatherly hand."

This stipulation has generally been regarded as the cancellation of the agreement to establish the Grand Principality of Ruthenia (Rus') as envisioned by the original treaty text of Hadiach in September 1658. However, it has often been misrepresented as not mentioning the term at all:

- "However, the Poles were no wiser than the Muscovite politicians and, taking advantage of the Ukrainians’ difficult situation at the time, refused to reinstate the Union of Hadiach as it had been originally drawn up, instead removing from it everything that referred to the Grand Pr[incipality] of Rus'." Mykhailo Hrushevsky (1921).
- "Iurii Khmel'nyts'kyi renounced the idea in 1660 (the Treaty of Chudniv with the Commonwealth did not include the term Rus' Principality)." Tatiana Tairova-Yakovleva (2020).
- "On 29 (19) October 1660, Y. Khmelnytsky arrived at the camp of the Crown forces, where, in the presence of the Grand Hetman of the Crown, S. Potocki and E.-S. Lubomirski, confirmed by oath the Treaties of Hadiach (from which the clause on the establishment of the Ruthenian Grand Principality had been removed) and the T[reaty] of Ch[udniv] itself." Viktor Horobets (2021).
- "The new treaty expunged the very name of the Rus' principality, so important to the Cossack authors of the Hadiach union." Serhii Plokhy (2022).

Differing versions of the text have been circulating, including Ukrainian translations such as Vasyl Herasymchuk's rendition, published by the Shevchenko Scientific Society (Lviv 1913), featuring phrases such as "with the exception of" that are not found in the original Polish treaty text:

1) Пани гетьмани мають присягою ствердити гадяцьку комісію ві всїх її точках, з вилученєм тої точки, де говорить ся про руське князївство, яко менче користне для вольностий запорожського війська і тревалости мира, котрого обопільно щиро бажаємо. Гетьман запорожський має присягнути в імени своїм і війська, що сї точки згоди відішле через своїх полковників до й. м. короля і віддасть їх в його любі, батьківські руки.
"The Hetmans are to confirm by oath the Hadiach Commission in all its clauses, with the exception of the clause referring to the Ruthenian Principality, as this is deemed less conducive to the liberties of the Zaporizhian Host and to the durability of the peace, which we both sincerely desire. The Hetman of the Zaporizhian Host shall swear, in his own name and that of the Host, that he will send these terms of agreement via his colonels to His Majesty the King and place them in his loving, fatherly hands."

A 2004 modern Ukrainian translation co-published by the Shevchenko Scientific Society ran as follows:

1. Їх милості пани гетьмани повинні підтвердити своєю присягою Гадяцьку угоду, тобто все, що в ній знаходиться. Що ж належить до тих пунктів, які стосуються до князівства Руського (оскільки вони менше необхідні для вільностей Війська його королівської милості Запорозького і менше служать в непорушності вічного миру, якого обоюдного від Господа Бога щиро бажаєм), то хай присягне його милість пан гетьман запорозький зі своїм Військом у тому, що він відішле ті пункти через своїх полковників до його королівської милості і віддасть їх у люб'язні батьківські руки.
"1. Their Excellencies the Hetmans must confirm the Treaty of Hadiach by taking an oath, that is to say, everything contained therein. As for those clauses which pertain to the Ruthenian Principality (since they are of less importance to the liberties of His Royal Majesty’s Zaporizhian Host and contribute less to the preservation of the eternal peace which we both sincerely desire from the Lord God), let His Grace the Zaporizhian Hetman, together with his Host, swear an oath that he will send those clauses via his colonels to His Royal Grace and place them in his gracious, fatherly hands."

== See also ==
- Partition of Ukraine
- Treaty of Hadiach (1658–1659)
- Pereiaslav Agreement (1654)
- Pereiaslav Articles of 1659
- Zherdivski Articles (1659)
- Truce of Andrusovo (1667)

== Bibliography ==
- Halushka, Andriy Anatoliyovych (2013). "Чуднівська кампанія 1660" [Chudniv campaign 1660]. Encyclopedia of History of Ukraine (in Ukrainian). Vol. 10. Kyiv: Institute of History of Ukraine. p. 580–581. Archived from the original on 9 June 2024.
- Horobets, Viktor Mykolayovych (2021). "Чуднівський договір 1660" [Treaty of Chudniv 1660]. Encyclopedia of History of Ukraine (in Ukrainian). Kyiv: Institute of History of Ukraine. Archived from the original on 19 September 2026.
- Kroll, Piotr (2008). Od ugody hadziackiej do Cudnowa: kozaczyzna między Rzecząpospolitą a Moskwą w latach 1658–1660 [From the Hadiach Agreement to Chudniv. The Cossackdom between the Polish–Lithuanian Commonwealth and Muscovy in the Years 1658–1660] (in Polish). Warszawa: Wydawnictwa Uniwersytetu Warszawskiego. p. 452. ISBN 978-83-235-0496-2.
  - Review: Pernal, Andrew B. (2011). "Reviewed Work(s): Od ugody hadziackiej do Cudnowa. Kozaczyzna między Rzecząjpospolitą a Moskwą w latach 1658-1660 [From the Hadziacz Agreement to Cudnów. The Cossackdom between the Polish-Lithuanian Commonwealth and Muscovy in the Years 1658-1660] by Piotr Kroll". Jahrbücher für Geschichte Osteuropas. 59 (4). Franz Steiner Verlag: 615–616. ISSN 0021-4019. JSTOR 41445775.
- "Slobodyshche, Treaty of". Encyclopedia of Ukraine. Vol. 4. Canadian Institute of Ukrainian Studies. 1993.
- Tairova-Yakovleva, Tatiana (2020). Ivan Mazepa and the Russian Empire (PDF). Montreal Kingston London Chicago: McGill-Queen's Press. p. 425. ISBN 978-0-2280-0309-0.
