= Zherdivski Articles =

Fragment of the Zherdivski Articles of October 1659, proposed as a set of interstate agreements between the Ukrainian Cossack Hetmanate and the Muscovite Tsardom, but rejected by boyar Aleksey Trubetskoy.

The Zherdivski Articles or Zherdiv Articles (Ukrainian: Жердівські статті, romanized: Zherdivski statti, after the valley of Zherdova or Zherdova Dolyna, where the Cossack community discussed and composed the text) were drafted as a new inter-state agreement proposed by representatives of the Cossack leadership to the Muscovite Tsardom in 1659, following the proclamation of Yurii Khmelnytsky as hetman, which effectively provided for the complete independence of the Cossack Hetmanate and minimised its dependence on Muscovy.

The Zherdiv Articles were rejected by the Muscovite boyar Aleksey Trubetskoy. In October 1659, he laid siege to the Cossacks led by Yurii Khmelnytsky near Pereiaslav with an army of 40,000 Muscovite soldiers, thereby forcing them to accept the Pereiaslav Articles of 1659 instead of the Zherdivski Articles, which they had proposed. Trubetskoy's Pereiaslav Articles significantly curtailed Ukraine's autonomy and granted Muscovy greater authority over the Hetmanate.

== Provisions ==
A 1858 Russified copy of the 1659 Zherdivski Articles.

1. The hereditary nature of the privileges and liberties granted by the Muscovite government to Bohdan Khmelnytsky in 1654.
2. A ban on stationing Moscow-appointed governors in Ukrainian cities other than Kyiv
3. A prohibition on the hetman sending letters on behalf of the Zaporizhian Host without the knowledge of the entire senior officer corps, and without the hetman’s own signature and seal. (The aim of this provision was to protect the hetman’s authority from accusations of ‘treason’ by rebels and adventurers)
4. All regiments on both sides of the Dnipro must obey the Hetman
5. The right of the Zaporizhian Host to elect as hetman whomever it sees fit, without any outside interference or pressure. The newly elected hetman himself sends envoys to the tsar for confirmation
6. The proclamation of the supremacy of the colonels in all Ukrainian towns
7. The hetman's right to receive foreign ambassadors without any restrictions
8. The entire population of the Zaporizhian Host shall henceforth and for ever be subject to the hetman and fall under his jurisdiction
9. Any agreements with neighbouring states of the Zaporizhian Host, and in particular with the Polish–Lithuanian Commonwealth, Sweden and the Crimean Khanate, must be concluded in the presence of a commissioner from the Host, who shall have the right to vote and to take part in the negotiations
10. All the 'rights, liberties and privileges' enjoyed by all classes, both ecclesiastical and secular, since the time of the Rus' princes, the grand dukes of Lithuania, and the kings of the Polish–Lithuanian Commonwealth were reaffirmed
11. The introduction of a general amnesty without any restrictions
12. The subordination of the Metropolitan of Kyiv, together with all his churches, monasteries and clergy, to the Patriarch of Constantinople
13. The Metropolitan of Kyiv was to be elected by the clergy and the Cossack officers
14. The freedom for schools to operate in any language of instruction and the establishment of monasteries on both banks of the Dnipro

== Literature ==
- Basarab, John (1982). Pereiaslav 1654: A Historiographical Study. Edmonton: Canadian Institute of Ukrainian Studies. Archived from the original on 7 March 2019.
- В. І. Сергійчук. Жердівські статті 1659 // Українська дипломатична енциклопедія [Ukrainian Diplomatic Encyclopedia]: У 2-х т. /Редкол.:Л. В. Губерський (голова) та ін. — Kyiv: Знання України, 2004 — Т.1 — 760 с. ISBN 966-316-039-X
- Яковлів А. Українсько-московські договори XVII—XVIII ст. — Відень, 1934;
- Пичета В. И. Казацкое государство на Украине (XVII—XVIII вв.). — Moscow, 1945.
- Orest Subtelny. Україна: Історія — Kyiv: Либідь, 1993.
- Липинський В. Україна на переломі. 1657—1659. — К., 1997.
- Смолій В., Степанков В. Українська державні ідеї XVII—XVIII століть: проблеми формування, еволюції, реалізації. — Kyiv, 1997.
- Natalia Yakovenko. Нарис історії України з найдавніших часів до кінця XVIII ст. — Kyiv: Генеза, 1997.
- Горобець, Віктор Миколайович (2011). "Переяславські статті 1659". Encyclopedia of History of Ukraine (in Ukrainian). Vol. 8. Kyiv: Institute of History of Ukraine. p. 147. Archived from the original on 7 September 2026.
- Plokhy, Serhii (2022). The Gates of Europe: A History of Ukraine. New York, NY: Basic Books. p. 414. ISBN 978-0-465-07394-8.
- Zhukovsky, Arkadii (1993). "Pereiaslav Articles of 1659". Encyclopedia of Ukraine. Vol. 3. Canadian Institute of Ukrainian Studies.
