= Vasily Borisovich Sheremetev =

Russian military commander and state official

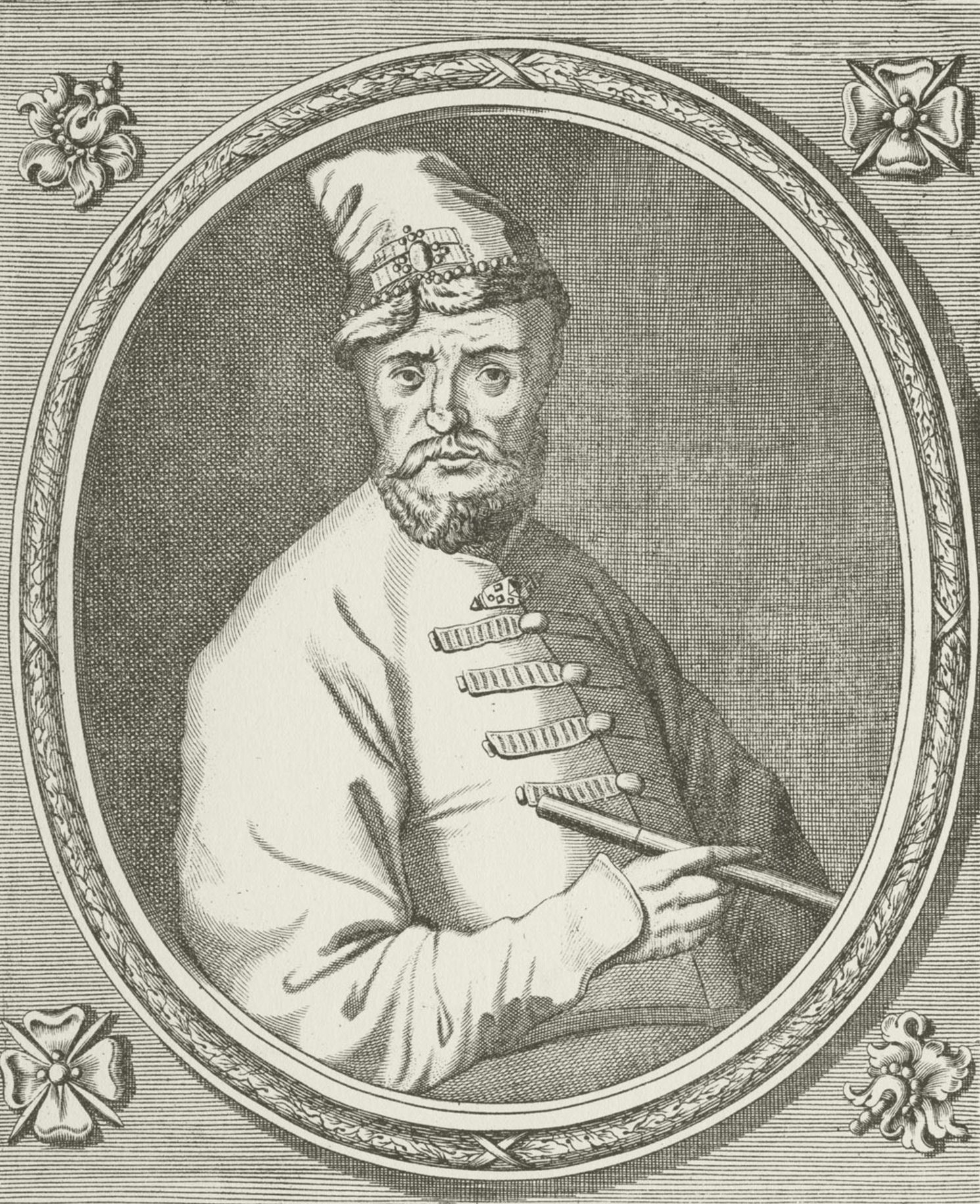
Vasily Borisovich Sheremetev

Vasily Borisovich Sheremetev (Russian: Василий Борисович Шереметев) (1622 - 24 April 1682) was a Russian military commander and state official of Sheremetev family, boyar since 1653, voivode of Smolensk (1656-1658), later of Kiev (1658-1660?).

== Career ==
In 1646 he was in charge of border guard regiments in Yablunov and Yelets (today both are in Lipetsk Oblast). In 1649 Sheremetev was appointed a voivode of Tobolsk. In 1653-54 he led border guard detachments quartered at the Belgorod Defense Line. During the Khmelnytsky Uprising, his military contingent joined military troops of Bohdan Khmelnytskyi.

One of Muscovite commanders during the Russo-Polish War (1654–1667); he fought in the battle of Ochmatów (1655) where he led Muscovite "Southern Corps" and the battle of Cudnów (1660). In 1656 Sheremetev was appointed as a voivode of Smolensk and played an active role in Muscovite and Commonwealth negotiations of 1650s. In 1658 he led a Muscovite delegation in Barysaw (today a city in Minsk Voblast) where he had a conflict with polkovnyk of Belarus Regiment Ivan Nechay.

On 6 April 1658 by a Tsar's decree Sheremetev was appointed a voivode of the Muscovite 6,000 garrison in Kiev and was assisted by Prince Yuriy Bariatinsky. Sheremetev supported election of Yurii Khmelnytsky as Hetman of Zaporizhian Host. Following the 1660 Cudnów campaign culminated in battle of Cudnów, Sheremetev was taken prisoner by Polish troops and handed over to Crimean Tatar Khan Mehmed IV Giray.

He was prisoner for more than 20 years (1660–1681) in Chufut-Kale, he died in Tsardom of Muscovy. During his imprisonment, there died his wife and his son Ivan.

== See also ==
- Deluge (history)
- Pereyaslav Council
