= Battle of Kotlin =

- Part of Russo-Swedish War (1656–1658)
- Bird's eye view of Kotlin Island
Date	22 June [O.S. 1 August] 1656
Location	Kotlin Island
Result	Russian victory

Belligerents
(yes) Sweden	Tsardom of Russia

Commanders and leaders
(Swedish Empire) Irek Dalsfer (POW)	(Tsardom of Russia) Pyotr Potemkin

Strength
3 galleys	15 strugs

Casualties and losses
1 galley and her entire crew	Unknown

The Battle of Kotlin (Russian: Бой у острова Котлин) There was a naval battle in the Gulf of Finland, As a result, the Swedes lost one ship and retreated.

== Battle ==
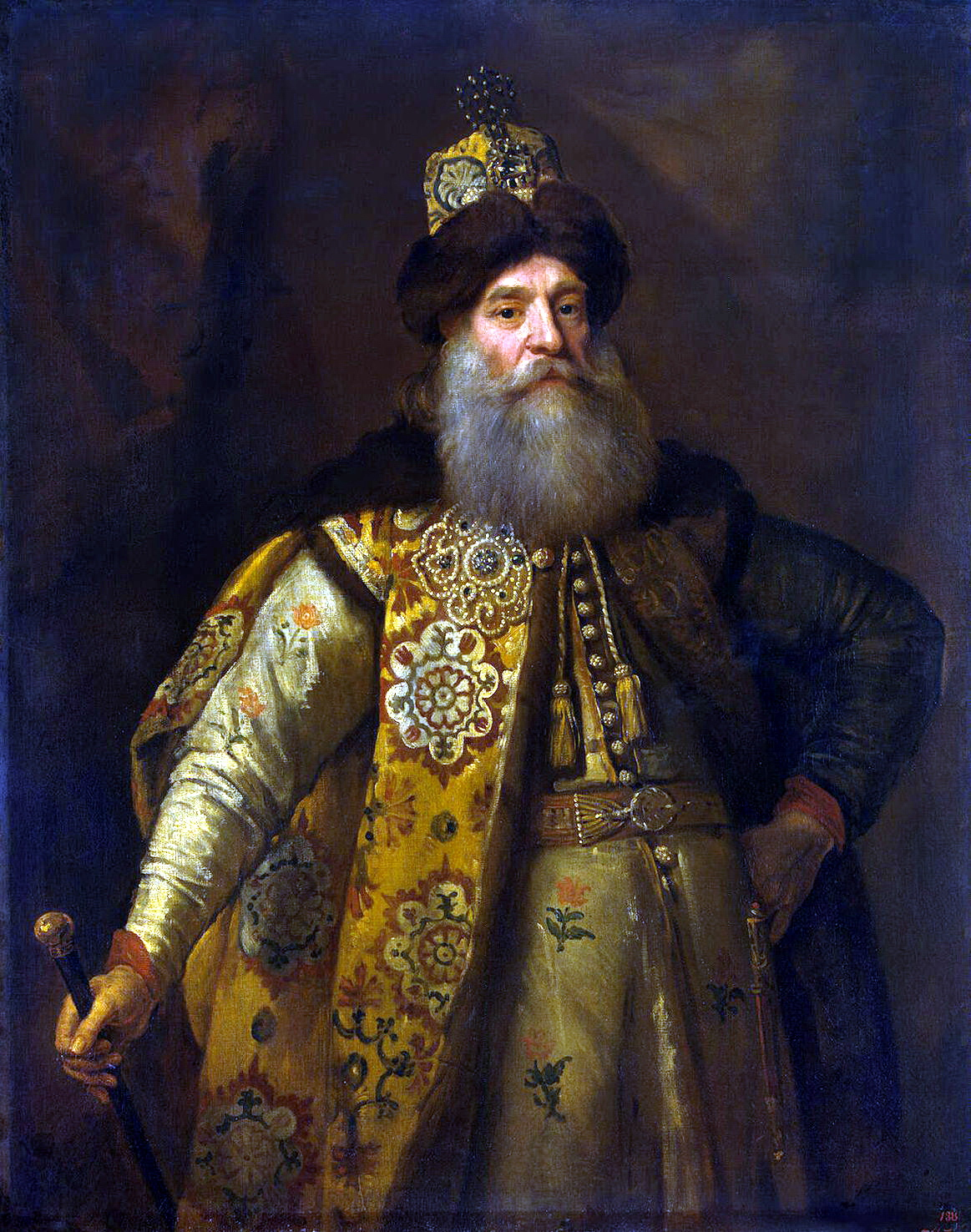
Russian commander

In July 1656, Russian troops besieged the fortress of Notenburg, and a Swedish detachment tried to land in their rear. The Russian commander Pyotr Potemkin reacted quickly to this and ambushed the Swedes, capturing their commander and killing the entire detachment on the ship.

The battle is considered Russia's first naval victory.
