= Battle of Rautu Church =

Battle at Rautu in 1656

- Part of the Russo-Swedish War (1656–1658)
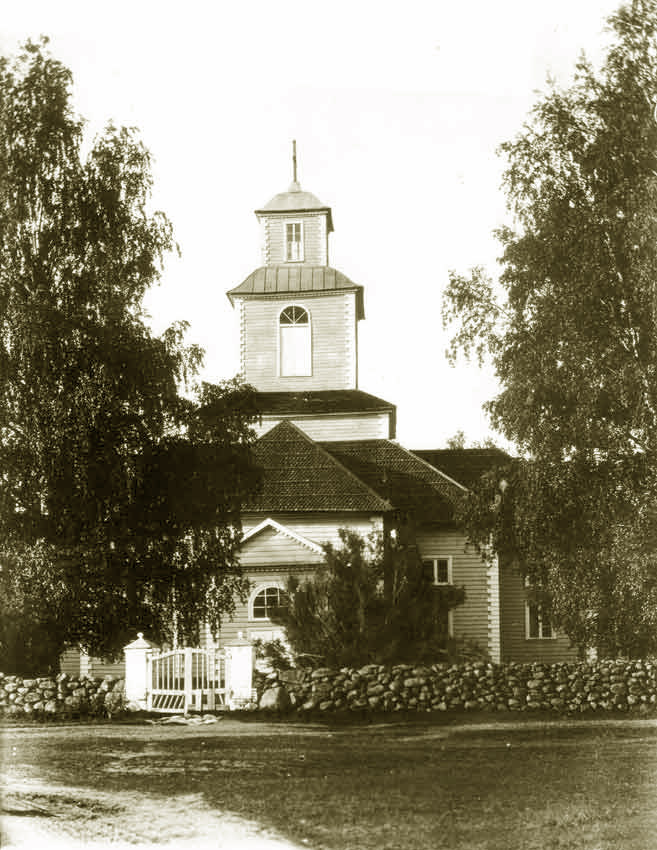
- Old Lutheran church in Rautu
Date	14 July 1656
Location	Rautu, Kexholm County
Result	Swedish victory
Territorial changes	Russians are repulsed from Rautu

Belligerents
(yes) Swedish Empire	Tsardom of Russia

Commanders and leaders
(Swedish Empire) Christopher Burmeister	(Tsardom of Russia) Sila Potyomkin

Units involved
Unknown	(Tsardom of Russia) Sila Potyomkin's corps

Strength
1,170 men: 820 levied peasants; 200 dragoons; 150–200 cavalry	700–800 men

Casualties and losses
26–40 killed 61 wounded	200 killed 2 captured

The Battle of Rautu Church (Swedish: Slaget vid Rautus kyrka; Russian: Битва при церкви Рауту) was a failed Russian attempt to stop a Swedish relief force headed for Kexholm during the Russo-Swedish War (1656–1658). The Swedes, led by Christoffer Burmeister, successfully repelled the Russian attack at Rautu Church and forced them back. However, they withdrew from Rautu towards Viborg the next day, and the Russian forces claimed control of the battlefield soon after.

== Background ==
After burning down Taipale, the Swedish commanders at Viborg began planning an offensive to retake Nyen from the Russians, but when they received news of the ongoing Siege of Kexholm by the Russians, they instead decided to send all available units to relieve it. Fortunately for them, the veteran Christopher Burmeister was in the area to enlist a new cavalry regiment.

In late July, Burmeister led his force, which consisted of 820 levied peasants, 200 dragoons, and 150–200 cavalry in a relief expedition.

== Battle ==
On their way to Kexholm, the Swedes set up a fortified camp at Rautu (present-day Sosnovo), taking advantage of the church building to strengthen their positions. After having learned of the Swedish expedition, Pyotr Potyomkin sent Sila Potyomkin to assault the Swedish positions in order to shield the ongoing siege of Kexholm.

On 4:00 am, on 14 July, the Russian force under Sila Potyomkin surprise attacked the Swedes. The number of men in Potyomkin's corps has been put to 700–800 men by some, but this claim has been doubted by other historians. The Swedes successfully repulsed both the first and second Russian attacks, and the Russians were forced to retreat, who were pursued by the Swedish cavalry.

After being repelled, the Russians once more formed into full battle order and challenged the Swedes to battle. Seeing this, Burmeister was not slow to accept their challenge and quickly ordered his men to assault the Russians. The Russians managed to defend for four hours until they were eventually defeated and scattered, being forced to flee into a nearby forest for safety.

Although many Russians died during the pursuit, the Swedish cavalry was too few in number to achieve any conclusive results.

=== Losses ===
==== Swedish losses ====
The Swedish losses were as follows:

- 26 killed, among those killed were Petter Udny, Lieutenant Petter Dragoun, and Bartholdis Simonis
- 61 wounded

==== Russian losses ====
The Russian losses were as follows:

- 200 killed
- 2 captured
- 250 muskets captured
- 4 flags and drums captured

== Aftermath ==
Anders Koskull, the governor of Viborg, regarding the participation of the levied peasants during the battle, wrote the following to Charles X Gustav:

"In this engagement, our Finnish peasants have conducted themselves so freshly and righteously that they have received praise from the officers with pleasure"

As a result of shortages of ammunition and in particular slow-match, Burmeister and his men would return to Viborg, and the Russians to their previous positions in the Karelian Isthmus.

== Works cited ==
- Essen, Michael (2022). Charles X's Wars Vol.2: The Wars in the East, 1655-1657. Helion & Company. pp. 163–164. ISBN 9781915070302.
- Sundberg, Ulf (1998). Svenska krig 1521-1814 [Swedish wars 1521-1814] (in Swedish). Hjalmarson & Högberg. p. 224. ISBN 9789189660106.
- Ignatius, Karl Emil Ferdinand (1865). Finlands historia under Karl X Gustafs regering [History of Finland during the reign of Karl X Gustaf] (in Swedish). Edlund. pp. 82–83.
- Starbäck, Carl Georg (1886). Berättelser ur svenska historien: Carl X Gustaf. Carl XI [Stories from Swedish history: Carl X Gustaf. Charles XI] (in Swedish). F. & G. Beijers Förlag. p. 135.
- Isacsson, Claes-Göran (2015). Karl X Gustavs krig: Fälttågen i Polen, Tyskland, Baltikum, Danmark och Sverige 1655-1660 [Wars of Charles X Gustav: The campaigns in Poland, Germany, the Baltics, Denmark and Sweden 1655-1660] (in Swedish). Historiska Media. p. 78. ISBN 9789175450117.
- Carlon, Manfred (1903). Ryska kriget 1656-1658 [The Russian war 1656–1658] (in Swedish). Stockholm: Centraltryckeriet. p. 46.
