= Skirmish at Neuhof =

1657 battle of the Russo-Swedish War

- Part of the Russo-Swedish War (1656–1658)
Date	October 1657
Location	Neuhof
Result	Swedish victory
Territorial changes	Russian advance towards Marienburg repelled

Belligerents
(yes) Swedish Empire	Tsardom of Russia

Commanders and leaders
(Swedish Empire) Otto Leonard von Bülow	(Tsardom of Russia) B.M. Nacluda †

Units involved
Unknown	(Tsardom of Russia) Neuhof camp

Strength
26 men 14 cavalrymen 12 dragoons	300 men

Casualties and losses
Unknown	Everyone killed

The skirmish at Neuhof occurred in October of 1657 Russo-Swedish War of 1656–1658 after the Swedes had found out about a Russian plan to attack Marienburg and their arrival in Neuhof. The Swedish commander, Otto Leonard von Bülow, successfully infiltrated the Russian camp, leading to all the Russians along with their commander being killed.

== Background ==
After an initial failed siege of Marienburg in August, the Russians began planning another attack in October. Five companies from Adsel advanced towards Neuhof, around a mile from Marienburg, here, the Russians awaited reinforcements of 300 men from Neuhasen.

== Skirmish ==
Upon receiving reports of the Russian arrival in Neuhof, Captain Otto Leonard von Bülow was sent with 14 cavalrymen and 12 dragoons from Marienburg, making the Russians retreat around a mile and a half. However, immediately after, the 300 men from Neuhasen arrived at the meeting spot.

When the Swedes arrived at Neuhof during the night, the Russians mistook them for the Russian forces from Adsel, and Bülow was hailed by the guards, and responded in fluent Russian, leading to Otto and his 26 men being let into the Russian camp without issue. Afterwards, the Russian commander, B.M. Nacluda was shot, killing him. In the ensuing chaos, the Russian troops, jolting awake, were all killed. Two standards and two sledges with muskets were taken by the Swedes.

== Aftermath ==
Shortly after the successful raid, the Swedes, now reinforced with 80 peasants, continued towards Neuhasen, where they would encounter the troops from Adsel, and their camp was destroyed, with the few who were able to escape the fires being killed. Two more Russian camps would be destroyed, and several hundred Russians were killed. On their way back, the Swedes also killed some 50 more men.

Through Bülow's actions, the area had been completely cleansed of Russian forces, and their original plan to capture Marienburg was abandoned temporarily.

== Works cited ==
- Fagerlund, Rainer (1979). Stade, Arne (ed.). Kriget på östfronten [The War on the Eastern Front] (in Swedish). Militärhistoriska förlaget. ISBN 9789185266098.
- Carlon, Manfred (1903). Ryska kriget 1656-1658 [The Russian War 1656–1658] (in Swedish). Centraltryckeriet.
- Bonnesen, Sten (1924). Karl X Gustav [Charles X Gustav] (in Swedish). Gleerups.
