= Battle of Gdov =

1657 battle

- Part of the Russo-Swedish War (1656–1658) and the Augdov expedition
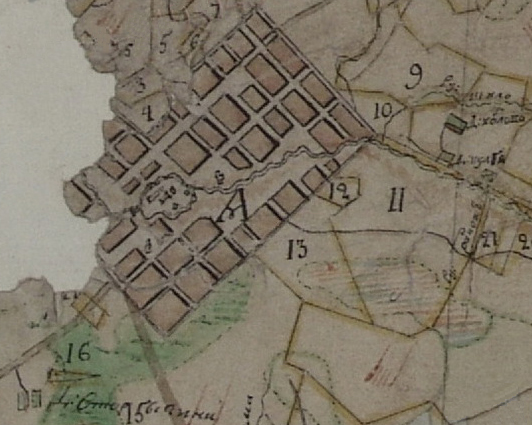
- Plan of Gdov from the late 18th century
| Date | 16 September 1657 |
| Location | Gdov, Russia |
| Result | Russian victory |

Belligerents
| Tsardom of Russia | (yes) Swedish Empire |

Commanders and leaders
| (Tsardom of Russia) Ivan Khovansky | (Swedish Empire) Magnus De la Gardie |

Strength
| 3,500 to 5,000 | 3,000 |

Casualties and losses
| 172 (Russian sources); 400 (Swedish sources) | 150–160 (Swedish sources); 1,000 (Russian sources) |

The Battle of Gdov in the Russo-Swedish War took place on September 16, 1657, in Gdov. The battle was a clear victory for Prince Ivan Khovansky of the Tsardom of Russia over Swedish Governor-General Count Magnus De la Gardie allowing the Russians to regroup after a brief resurgence of Swedish resistance.

== Prelude ==
After the defeat at Walk, in July 1657, Ivan Khovansky was appointed as the Pskov voivode. His army was reinforced with 10 companies of Reiters and 3 companies of Dragoons (about 1,200 men). In September, the Swedes under Governor-General Count Magnus De la Gardie invaded the Gdov district, but Prince Khovansky timely learned about the invasion of the Swedish army and managed to reinforce the garrison of the city to 1,000 men (300 noble militia, 300 Don Cossacks, 200 Streltsy, 100 Luga Cossacks, 100 mercenaries), but with only two guns. Nevertheless, the garrison managed to repel all attacks, and even make several successful sorties.

== Battle ==
Upon learning of the arrival of the Swedes, Prince Khovansky hastily advanced to Gdov. On the night of September 16, Russian troops caught the retreating army of De la Gardie 3 versts from Gdov on the river Chermi. Beginning the persecution, Prince Khovansky sent forward the cavalry: 12 noble hundreds, Don Cossacks and Reiters. The decisive action was the attack of the Russian Reiters, who knocked the enemy out of position and fled. De la Gardie ordered all his artillery to be thrown into the water. In 15 versts of persecution, Russian troops scattered enemy forces. Swedes lost many officers, banners, artillery and over 1,000 men.

== Aftermath ==
Having broken the troops of the Governor-General Count De la Gardie, the victory of Prince Khovansky greatly diminished the recent successes of the Swedish army in 1657, and restored the strategic initiative of the Russian army.

== Sources ==
- Kurbatov, Oleg A. (2017). Военные реформы в России второй половины XVII века: Конница [Military reforms in Russia in the second half of the 17th century: Cavalry]. Историчкские исследования (historical research) (in Russian). Moscow: Квадрига. ISBN 978-5-91791-210-3.
