= Sieges of Marienburg (1657) =

Part of the Russo-Swedish War

- Part of the Russo-Swedish War (1656–1658)
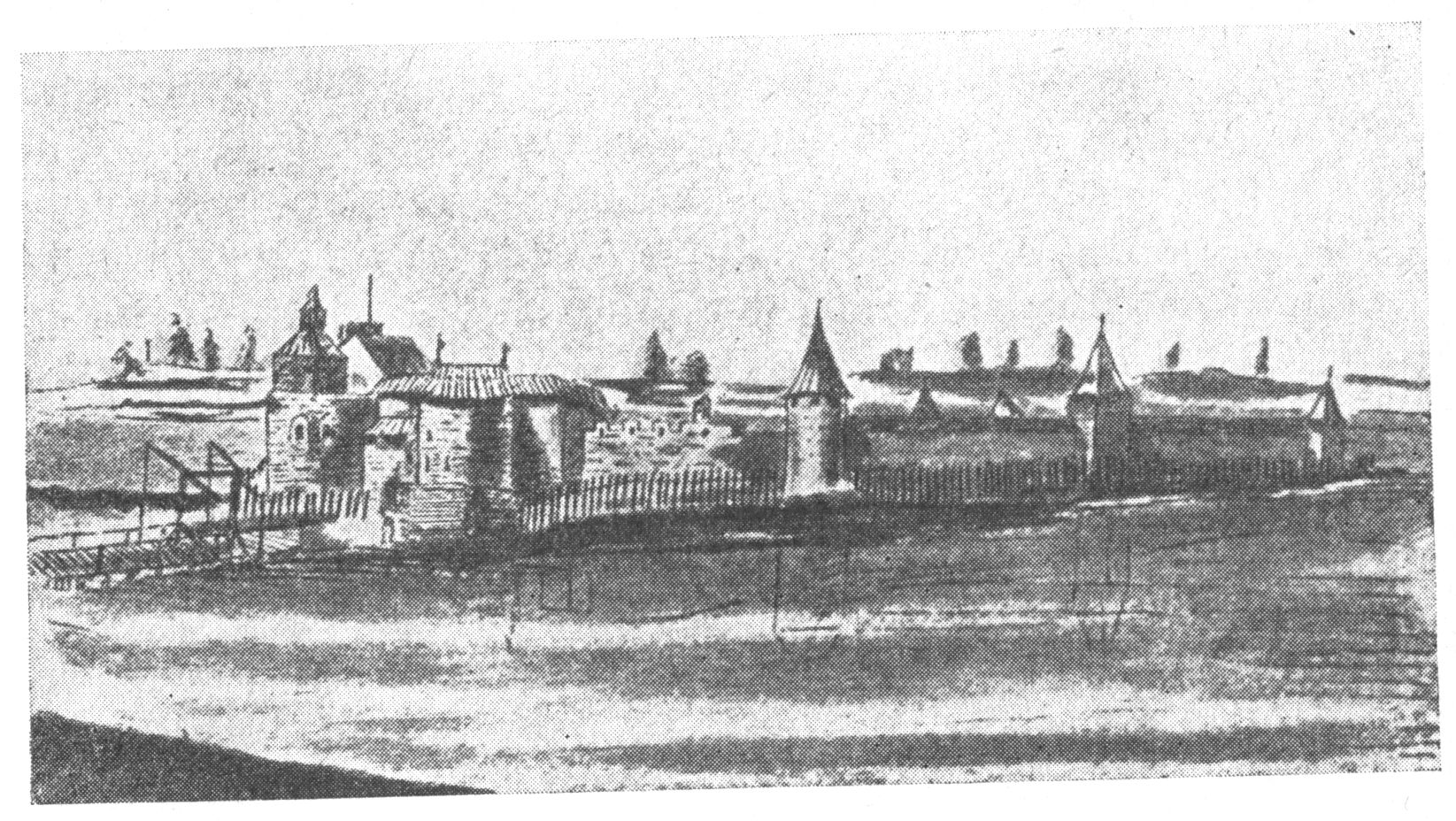
- Marienburg Castle in 1661
Date	First siege 19–27 August 1657; Second siege 24 November – 11 December
Location	Marienburg (Alūksne Castle)
Result	Russian victory
Territorial changes	Marienburg captured by Russian forces

Belligerents
Tsardom of Russia	(yes) Swedish Empire

Commanders and leaders
(Tsardom of Russia) Ivan Khovansky (Tsardom of Russia) Afanasy Ordin-Nashchokin	(Swedish Empire) Mattias Hillgarten (POW) (Swedish Empire) Otto Leonard von Bülow (WIA)

Units involved
Unknown	(Swedish Empire) Marienburg garrison

Strength
First siege 5,000 men Second siege 3,000 infantry and 500 cavalry or 2,000 men	Second siege Couple dozen men

Casualties and losses
300 killed	8 killed Several wounded

The sieges of Marienburg were two separate Russian sieges of Marienburg, the first in August, and the second in November and December, with the first being unsuccessful and the second being successful.

== Background ==
Marienburg had been in Swedish control for a while, and was the last Swedish outpost in the east. In the late-summer of 1657, Russian activity increased against Marienburg, which eventually led to its fall in December.

== Sieges ==
=== First siege ===
In mid-August, the Russians made the first large attempt to capture Marienburg. On 19 August, the Russian vanguard stood in front of the city. A boyar, who had been captured earlier, claimed that the entire Russian army, which had been estimated at some 20,000 men, was close. On the following day, the main Russian force arrived, threatening Marienburg from two sides. However, it was not Gowanski's entire army, instead being around 5,000 men from it. The Russians sent a captured Finnish soldier to demand its surrender. However, when this demand was repeated multiple times, the Swedish defenders responded by firing on the Russians. During the siege, the Russians spread themselves out into a mile long line around Marienburg, burning and pillaging. and on 25 August, the main Russian force retreated after having plundered the nearby land. On 27 August, the 800 Russians that had been left behind also retreated.

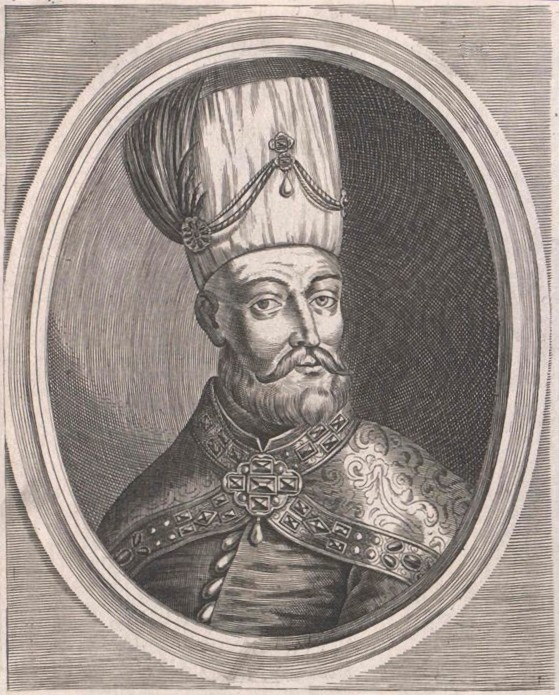
Portrait of Ivan Khovansky, the commander of the Russian forces during the first siege.

Oleg Kurbatov suggests that the reason for such actions on the part of the Russians was that they initially did not try to take the fortress, but wanted to distract the Swedes from invading Russia.

=== Second siege ===
On 24 November, the Russians returned, this time being led by Afanasy Ordin-Nashchokin. The Russian army, according to contemporary Swedish accounts, consisted of 3,000 infantry and 500 cavalry. While the Swedish garrison only had a couple dozen men due to an outbreak of the plague. Soon, an old fortress, most likely on the island itself, was stormed by the Russians. Otto Leonard von Bülow did a sortie with 13 cavalry and infantry, but was forced to withdraw back into the fortress after being wounded in his leg from a grenade. On 10 December, the main Russian storming took place. The Russians were repulsed ten times by the garrison but eventually managed to blow one of the gates open, after which the commander, Mattias Hillgarten saw further resistance as unnecessary and surrendered on 11 December.

== Aftermath ==
According to the surrender terms, everyone who wished to leave would be allowed to do so and even be escorted to Reval. However, disregarding the oath, Nashchokin detained the soldiers, some of whom were robbed. The commander was also held prisoner as collateral.

=== Losses ===
The Russians suffered some 300 killed, while only 8 Swedes died and some more wounded.

== Works cited ==
- Fagerlund, Rainer (1979). Stade, Arne (ed.). Kriget på östfronten [The War on the Eastern Front] (in Swedish). Militärhistoriska förlaget. ISBN 9789185266098.
- Carlon, Manfred (1903). Ryska kriget 1656-1658 [The Russian War 1656–1658] (in Swedish). Centraltryckeriet.
- Essen, Michael Fredholm von (2023). Charles X's Wars: Volume 3 - The Danish Wars, 1657-1660. Helion & Company. ISBN 9781915113603.
- Isacson, Claes-Göran (2015). Karl X Gustavs krig: Fälttågen i Polen, Tyskland, Baltikum, Danmark och Sverige 1655-1660 [Wars of Charles X Gustav: The campaigns in Poland, Germany, the Baltics, Denmark and Sweden 1655-1660] (in Swedish). Historiska Media. ISBN 9789175450117.
- Sundberg, Ulf (2010). Sveriges krig 1630-1814 [Sweden's wars 1630-1814] (in Swedish). Svenskt militärhistoriskt bibliotek. ISBN 9789185789634.
- Kurbatov, Oleg (2018). Русско-Шведская война 1656-1658 [Russo-Swedish War of 1656-1658] (in Russian).
