= Siege of Riga (1656) =

Event during the Russo-Swedish War

Coordinates: 56.9489°N 24.1064°E

- Part of the Russo-Swedish War (1656–1658)
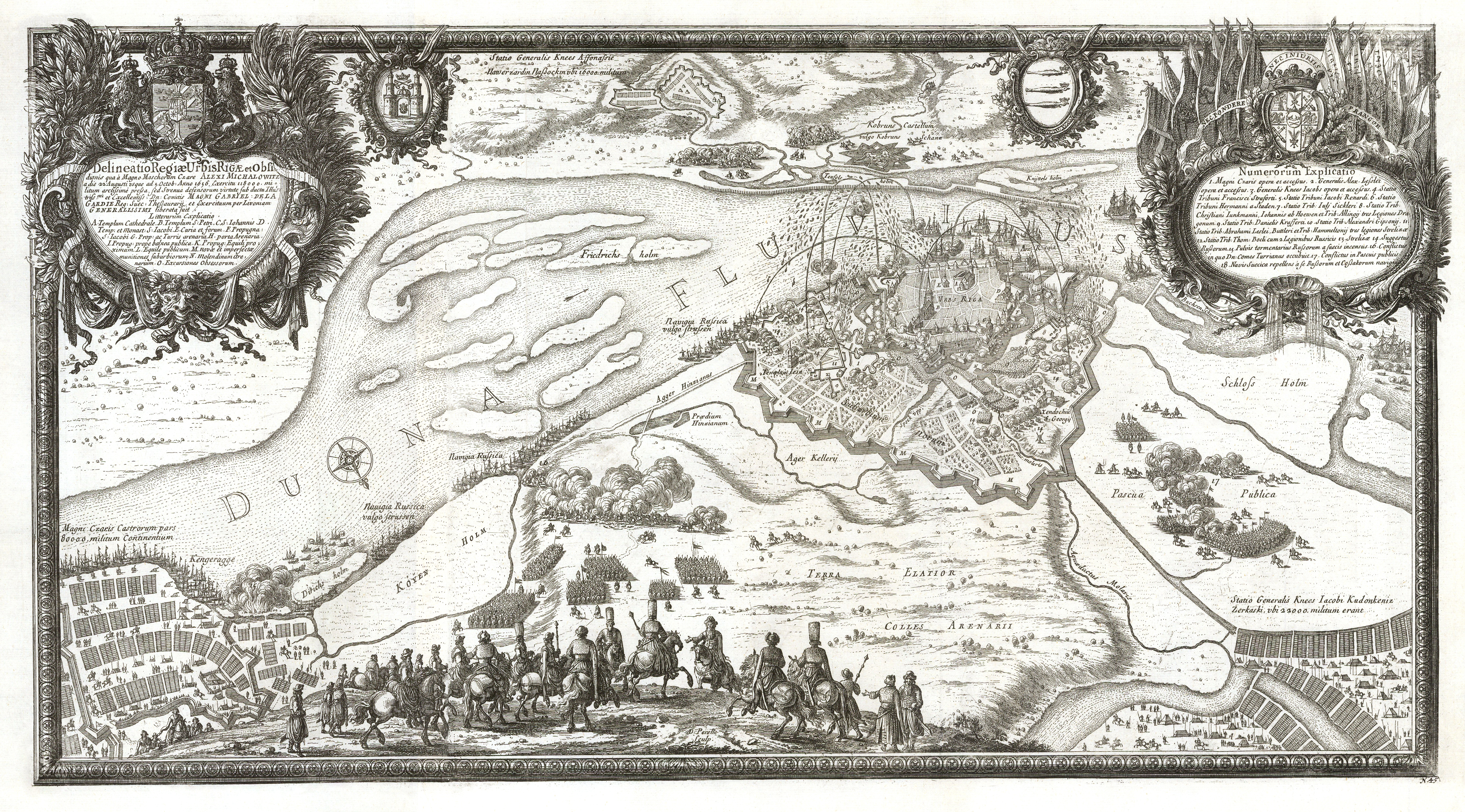
- Siege of Riga, engraving by Adam Perelle (c. 1697)
| Date | 21 August – 5 October 1656 |
| Location | Riga |
| Result | Swedish victory |
| Territorial changes | Russians lift the siege of Riga |

Belligerents
| Swedish Empire | Tsardom of Russia |

Commanders and leaders
| (Swedish Empire) Simon Grundel-Helmfelt (Swedish Empire) Heinrich von Thurn (POW) or † (Swedish Empire) Magnus De la Gardie | (Tsardom of Russia) Aleksey Mikhailovich (Tsardom of Russia) Vladimir v. Vizin (Tsardom of Russia) Ordyn-Nashokin |

Units involved
| (Swedish Empire) Riga garrison | (Tsardom of Russia) Daniel Krafert's infantry (Tsardom of Russia) Lunkmann's dragoons |

Strength
| 7,389 | 35,000 |

Casualties and losses
| Minimal | 8,000–14,000 dead(Swedish claims) 2,000 incl. 300 - 600 killed (Russian claims) |

The siege of Riga by the Russian army under Tsar Alexei Mikhailovich was the main event of the Russo-Swedish War. The fortifications of Riga consisted of a wall with ditch and 5 bastions around the old town. In 1652 Swedes had started construction of a new wall with 12 bastions around suburbs, but by 1656 the work had not been completed. The Russian vanguard consisting of the Vladimir v. Vizin reiters, Daniel Krafert infantry and Iunkmann dragoons approached Riga on August 20 and threw back the Swedes under count of Pärnu, Heinrich von Thurn into the city. Von Thurn was either killed, or captured in the action. The Swedes evacuated the suburbs and withdrew to the old town. A few days later, the main army under Tsar Alexei Mikhailovich arrived on the ships on the Duna River, and laid siege to Riga. The Russian army occupied three camps, two on the east bank of the Duna in Riga's suburbs, and a Corps under Ordyn-Nashokin on the west bank of the Duna, opposite the Kobrun entrenchment.

As Russia had no full-fledged navy to intercept reinforcements coming to the Swedish garrison across the Baltic, Riga managed to hold out until October, when foreign officers commanding a small Russian flotilla defected to the other side and the Russians had to lift the siege. In the aftermath of this reverse, the Swedes recaptured much of Ingria and inflicted a heavy defeat on the Russian general Matvey Sheremetev in battle of Walk in 1657.

The events of the siege were recorded in an engraving by Adam Perelli that was first published in 1697 in Samuel Puffendorf's work, Konung Carl X Gustafs Bragder.

== Prehistory ==
Russian troops appeared outside Riga for the first time in 1559, but did not dare to attack the city. During the Livonian War (1558-1583), most of what is now Latvia fell to Poland-Lithuania. The Livonian League dissolved. Riga was also forced to submit after initial resistance. During the armed conflicts between Poland and Sweden, Riga was again the target of attacks. In 1621, the Swedes under King Gustav Adolf succeeded in taking the city. 30,000 inhabitants meant that Riga was still larger than the already rapidly growing Swedish capital of Stockholm at this time.

Poland-Lithuania had failed in its efforts to put an end to the Khmelnytsky Uprising that had broken out in the south-east of the empire. Tsar Alexei I then signed the Treaty of Pereyaslav with Bohdan Khmelnytsky and the Zaporozhian Cossacks. Ukraine east of the Dnieper was to be placed under the protection of the Russian tsar. Tsar Alexei I thus decided to intervene in the conflict and support the Cossacks in their fight. The tsar's aim was to regain land in Smolensk and Ukraine that had been lost in the course of the Polish-Russian War of 1609-1618. The Russian claim to liberate all Rus territories from foreign rule also played a role. This marked the beginning of the Thirteen Years' War against Poland-Lithuania. By the end of 1655, large parts of Poland-Lithuania were occupied by Russia. Tsar Alexei I declared himself Grand Duke of Lithuania after the conquest of Vilnius in August 1655. In the south-west, a Russian-Kosak army conquered large parts of the country. However, the advance was thwarted by the intervention of the Polish ally Mehmed IV. Giray, Khan of the Crimean Khanate.

Sweden endeavoured to secure its Baltic possessions and intervened in the conflict. Poland-Lithuania was on the verge of collapse at the time. A further invasion of the republic by Russian troops would in turn have jeopardised Sweden's Baltic possessions. For this reason, King Charles X invaded the Polish noble republic in the summer of 1655 with an army of 50,000 men to prevent further Russian territorial gains.

The Swedish successes alarmed Tsar Alexei I. In May 1656, he declared war on the Swedes. The Swedish Baltic provinces were unprotected at this time and faced a Russian invasion. Sweden had fewer than 10,000 men in the Baltic provinces, spread across various garrisons. The army of the Russian Tsardom attacked Estonia, Ingermanland and Kexholm. They conquered the Swedish fortresses of Schlüsselburg and Nyenschanz in Ingermanland. In the summer of 1656, Tsar Alexei I led the army from Polotsk down the River Düna (Dwina, Daugava) and conquered Dünaburg in July and Kokenhusen Castle (Koknese) in August. The small Swedish army retreated to Riga, fighting a rearguard action.

== Siege ==
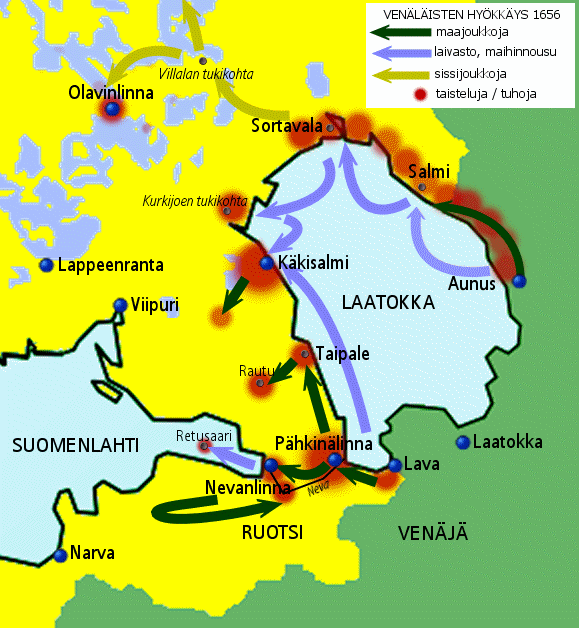
Map over Swedish-Russian war site at Lake Ladoga (1656-1658). Arrows represent the Russian attack forces on 1656.

The Russian army reached Riga on 21 August. The city was defended by 2,000 cavalry and dragoons, 1,800 infantry and a number of citizens, totalling no more than 5,000 men. The Swedish commander of the city, Magnus Gabriel De la Gardie, attempted to defend the extensive and as yet unfinished outer works despite his small manpower and against the advice of his generals. These were destroyed the very next night and the Swedish troops had to retreat into the city itself. The Russian army took up position on the River Düna and began the siege. These took place in two places: the castle was besieged with seven regiments, the other place was concentrated on the river side.

At this point, the Russian army failed to seize the mouth of the dune, which would have cut Riga off from the sea. The siege work was now well advanced, but was carried out without any overall plan. The trenches were clumsily directed and the bombardment was uncoordinated, which meant that although the cannons caused major damage to the city, the fortifications remained intact. However, the Russian artillery bombardment had a major impact on the morale of the citizens. Defectors and prisoners reported to the Russians that the citizens were demanding that the city be handed over to the Tsar, whereas the military were strictly against this and were waiting for reinforcements.

The Russian troops did not succeed in advancing beyond the fortress trenches. No attempt was made to storm the fortress. The Danish allies of the Russians were unable to ensure a naval blockade of the besieged city, which repeatedly undermined the siege effect.

== Lifting of the siege ==
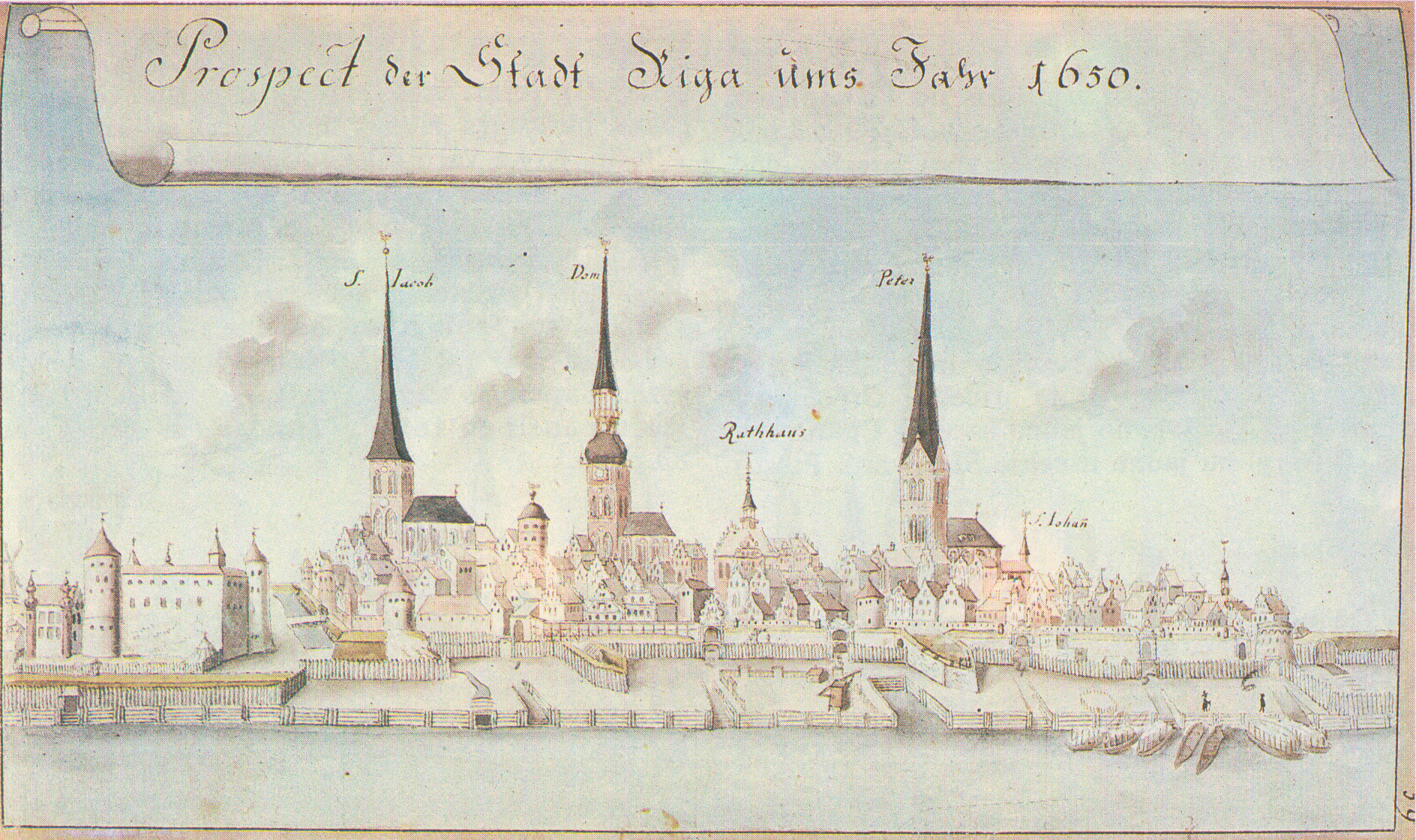
Prospect of the city of Riga around 1650. Drawing by Johann Christoph Brotze

On 12 September, the Swedish garrison received a reinforcement of 1,400 soldiers. The Tsar then called a war council to discuss the possibility of taking the fortress immediately by storming it and the advisability of a further siege. Most of the commanders expressed well-founded doubts that a storming would lead to success. A few days later, preparations began to lift the siege. At the same time, rumours arose that a plague epidemic had broken out in Riga, which also spoke against continuing the siege. The Russian army set out on 6 October. According to Swedish reports, the Russian army lost 14,000 men, which, however, seems very exaggerated since no attempts were made to storm the city.

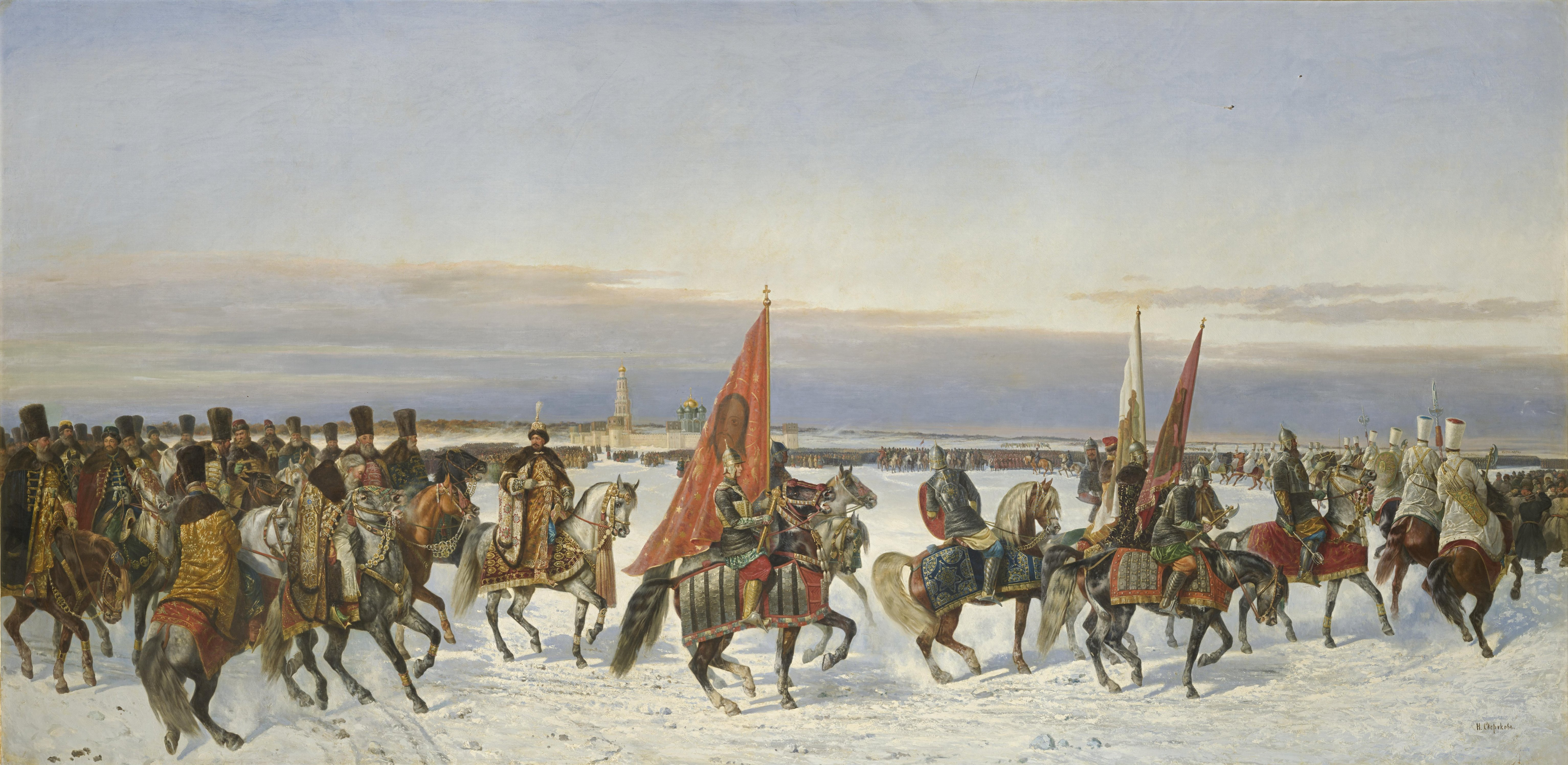
Tsar Alexei Mikhailovich inspecting his troops (history painting by Nikolai Sverchkov 1864)

The motives for lifting the siege on the Russian side were primarily of a diplomatic nature. By the end of the siege of Riga, the foreign policy situation had changed. The original reason for the war disappeared, as the danger of a Polish-Swedish real union no longer existed. The Tsar's campaign against Riga was transformed into a major demonstration of power, against the backdrop of which active negotiations were conducted with Poland, Brandenburg, Courland and Denmark. Under these conditions, an unsuccessful and costly storming of the city or a protracted siege would have been more dangerous for the tsar's prestige than an orderly and timely retreat. As a general, Alexei Mikhailovich never took adventurous steps and preferred to maintain the army and use other methods when there was no certainty of a successful outcome to his endeavours.

The decision to lift the siege was made after the failure of the capitulation negotiations with the garrison of Riga. The Tsar's hopes for diplomatic help from the Duke of Courland and the Elector of Brandenburg had not materialised.

Despite the military failure at Riga, the Baltic campaign of 1656 was considered a success in Moscow. Documents bear witness to the Tsar's triumphant entry into Polotsk, Smolensk and Moscow. The conquest of almost the entire course of the Düna, including Dünaburg and Kokenhusen, opened up an important line of communication to the Baltic for Russia.

== Consequences ==
Despite the retreat at Riga, Dorpat fell into Russian hands shortly afterwards in October 1656. The Russo-Swedish War gave the aristocratic republic time to reorganise itself. The following year, Russian troops again invaded Livonia. In 1658, the tsar and the Swedish king agreed a three-year truce.

After another siege, Riga was conquered by the troops of Tsar Peter the Great in 1710. The city then remained with Russia until the First World War.
