= Kärde =

Village in Estonia

Coordinates: 58°51′N 26°16′E

- Village
- Interactive map of Kärde
- Country: Estonia
- County: Jõgeva County
- Parish: Jõgeva Parish
- Time zone: UTC+2 (EET)
  - Summer (DST): UTC+3 (EEST)

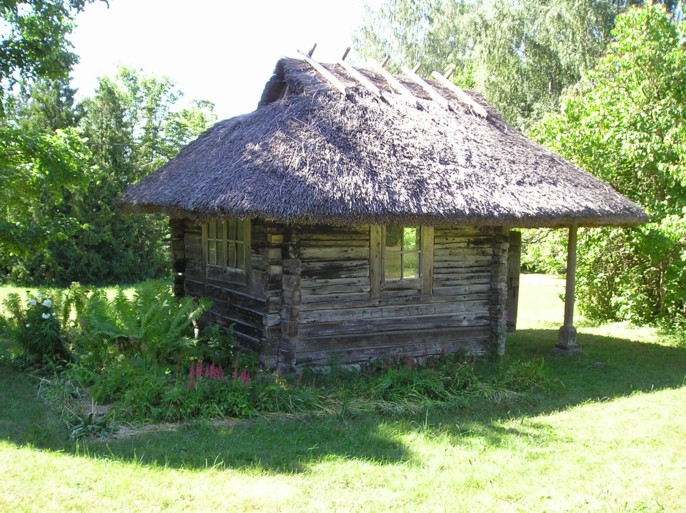
Small house near the Kärde Manor where according to the folklore the Treaty of Cardis was signed.

Kärde is a village in Jõgeva Parish, Jõgeva County, in eastern Estonia.

== History ==
Kärde Manor was the location where the Treaty of Cardis between Tsardom of Russia and Swedish Empire in 1661 after the Russo-Swedish War was signed.
