= Battle of Lälitz =

Russo-Swedish battle

- Part of the Russo-Swedish War (1656–1658)
Date	17 July 1657
Location	Lälitz, Jama
Result	Swedish victory

Belligerents
(yes) Swedish Empire	Tsardom of Russia

Commanders and leaders
(Swedish Empire) Henrik Wollmar Buck	(Tsardom of Russia) Unknown †

Units involved
Unknown	Unknown

Strength
150 men	1,600–2,000

Casualties and losses
1–30 killed 19 wounded	54–100 killed

The Battle of Lälitz (Swedish: Slaget vid Lälitz; Russian: Битва при Лялице) was an engagement fought between Swedish and Russian troops in the village of Lälitz on 17 July 1657. It ended with the Russian troops being repulsed and their commander dying of his wounds sustained during the fighting.

== Background ==
In the beginning of July 1657, Christer Horn received reports that a Russian force planned to attack his field army, which was for the time being stationed in Kaporie county by the village of Kattila. Captain lieutenant Henrik Wollmar Buck, the commander of the force, had some 150 men. He was notified of the Russian advance on 16 July and was ordered to instead attack the Russians first.

== Battle ==
On the same day, Buck arrived in the village of Lälitz. Early in the morning, the Russian advance was spotted marching towards the village. There was a pass in front of the Swedes' position, behind which most of the Russian force had halted. In total, the Russian force amounted to either 1,600 or 2,000 men, of which 1,000 were streltsy and 400 boyars, the remainder being Cossacks and peasants.

The boyars, who had formed the Russian vanguard, advanced across the pass, behind them were 200 streltsy and 200 Cossacks. Once these had crossed, they awaited the Swedish attack. The boyars took up position on the right, the Cossacks on the left, and the infantry in the center.

Buck told his men to fight as "honorable soldiers" and then commanded them to attack. At the first clash, the Russians fell back to their main force, whose gunfire forced the Swedes to turn back, closely pursued by the Russians. This maneuver was repeated three more times. However, a Russian company was eventually flanked by two Swedes, who cut its retreat off across the pass, and as a result, through the confusion that spread, most of the company was killed. Consequently, the entire Russian force withdrew into a nearby forest, while the Swedes continued harassing them on their rear and flanks. The Russian commander had also been mortally wounded in the fighting.

== Aftermath ==
As a result of the battle, 100 Russians had been killed. On the contrary, the Swedes suffered one killed and 19 wounded. While the Russians had not been fully routed, nothing at this point prevented Buck from linking with Gustav Evertsson Horn. Another source estimates the Swedish losses at 30 killed and 20 wounded, and for Russians 54 dead.

== Works cited ==
- Gyadzatsky, Sergei (1945). Борьба русских людей Ижорской земли в XVII веке против иностранного владычества [The struggle of the Russian people of Izhora land in the XVII century against foreign rule] (in Russian). Исторические записки.
- Carlon, Manfred (1903). Ryska kriget 1656-1658 [The Russian War 1656–1658] (in Swedish). Centraltryckeriet. pp. 99–100.
- Fagerlund, Rainer (1979). Stade, Arne (ed.). Kriget på östfronten [The War on the Eastern Front] (in Swedish). Militärhistoriska förlaget. p. 114. ISBN 9789185266098.
- Isacsson, Claes-Göran (2015). Karl X Gustavs krig: Fälttågen i Polen, Tyskland, Baltikum, Danmark och Sverige 1655-1660 [Wars of Charles X Gustav: The campaigns in Poland, Germany, the Baltics, Denmark and Sweden 1655-1660] (in Swedish). Historiska Media. p. 87. ISBN 9789175450117.
