= Truce of Vilna =

1656 treaty between Russia and Poland–Lithuania

The Truce of Vilna, Treaty of Wilno or Truce or Treaty of Niemieża (Note: Polish: Rozejm w Niemieży.) was a treaty signed at Niemieża (modern Nemėžis) near Vilnius (also known as Vilna or Wilno) on 3 November 1656 between the Tsardom of Russia and Polish–Lithuanian Commonwealth, introducing a truce during the Russo-Polish War (1654–67) and an anti-Swedish alliance in the contemporaneous Second Northern War. In return for ceasing hostilities and fighting Sweden alongside Poland–Lithuania, the treaty promised tsar Alexis of Russia to succeed the Polish–Lithuanian throne as soon as John II Casimir Vasa would die. Thus began the Russo-Swedish War (1656–1658), which Russia would lose.

The Cossack Hetmanate under Bohdan Khmelnytsky was excluded from the negotiations, and the Truce did nothing to address the Muscovite occupation of Lithuania and the status of Ukraine. The Ukrainian Cossacks were enraged by this Russian betrayal of the 1654 Pereiaslav Agreement that promised Muscovite military support for the Cossacks against the Commonwealth. Without their knowledge or consent, the Russian tsar had suddenly made a separate peace deal with the Commonwealth, and violated his duty of military protection of the Cossacks. Khmelnytsky therefore ignored the Truce of Vilna, and subsequently supported the Transylvanian invasion of Poland on the Swedish side.

== Developments ==
After a series of successes for the Russian forces, with an even more successful Swedish invasion of the Polish–Lithuanian Commonwealth, the Russian tsar decided that total defeat of the Commonwealth and a Swedish victory leading to a major strengthening of Sweden (a threat to Russia) would not be in the best interests of Russia.

The negotiations began in Autumn of 1655, between Field Hetman of Lithuania Wincenty Korwin Gosiewski and Russian commander Afanasy Ordin-Nashchokin, and led to a quick ceasefire along the Polish-Russian front, allowing the Commonwealth to concentrate on the Swedish incursion. In the light of its successes, the Commonwealth's stance in the negotiations intensified, and it has rejected Russian territorial demands; however, both Poland and Russia agreed to continue engaging Sweden. There were also negotiations about the Russian tsar or his descendant ascending to the Commonwealth's throne (see Polish–Lithuanian–Muscovite Commonwealth). Russian forces marched on Swedish Livonia and besieged Riga in the Russo-Swedish War (1656–58). The Russian ally, Zaporozhian Cossack hetman Bohdan Khmelnytsky was informed about the Russian plans; he was not against a temporary armistice with Poland as such; but he was afraid of an alliance between Russia and Poland aimed at crushing Cossack rebellion as a possible consequence of the treaty.

In 1658 the Russo-Polish war would resume, with another Russian invasion of the Commonwealth territories.

== Bibliography ==
- Corwin, Edward Henry Lewinski (1917). The Political History of Poland. Polish Book Importing Company.
- Frost, Robert I. (2003) [1993]. After the Deluge: Poland-Lithuania and the Second Northern War, 1655–1660. Cambridge University Press. p. 211. ISBN 978-0-521-54402-3.
- Frost, Robert I. (2000). The Northern Wars: War, State and Society in Northeastern Europe 1558–1721. Harlow, England; New York: Longman. p. 401. ISBN 978-0-582-06429-4.
- Plokhy, Serhii (2022). The Gates of Europe: A History of Ukraine. New York, NY: Basic Books. p. 414. ISBN 978-0-465-07394-8.
