= Battle of Pielis =

Russo-Swedish battle

- Part of the Russo-Swedish War (1656–1658)
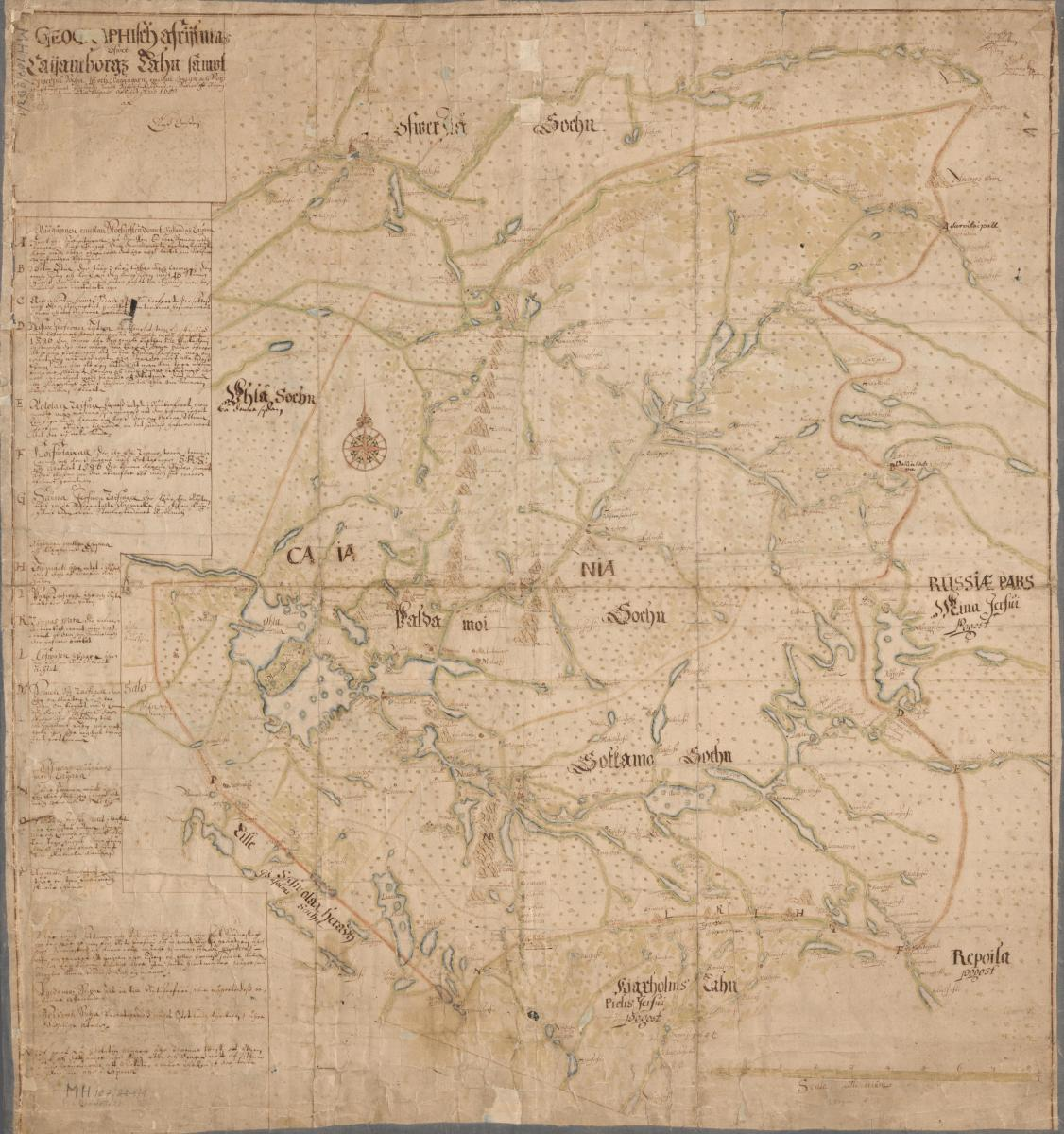
- 1650 map of Kajaani province
Date	7 August 1657
Location	Pielis, Kajaani
Result	Swedish victory
Territorial changes	Russian forces repulsed from Pielis

Belligerents
(yes) Swedish Empire	Tsardom of Russia

Commanders and leaders
(Swedish Empire) Zacharias Palmbaum	(Tsardom of Russia) Unknown

Units involved
(Swedish Empire) Finnish levies	Unknown

Strength
Unknown	300 men

Casualties and losses
8 killed	85 killed

The battle of Pielis occurred on 7 August 1657 in Kajaani during the Russo-Swedish War of 1656–1658. A Russian force estimated at some 300 men were raiding the province when a Finnish force under the command of Zacharias Palmbaum encountered them and managed to repel the Russians after intense fighting.

== Battle ==
In early August, approximately 300 Russian troops started raided Kajaani. On 7 August, they encountered Finnish levies under Zacharias Palmbaum, who had been training local peasants. After a tough battle, the Russians were eventually repelled. As a result of the battle, the Russians suffered some 85 casualties while the Swedes in comparison only lost 8 men according to Palmbaum.

== Aftermath ==
Due to the fighting in Pielis, no more tings were held there during the rest of the summer of 1657. The Russians intended to attack Pielis once more in November with some 170 men, but withdrew with the news that Palmbaum was heading towards Brahea.

== Works cited ==
- Lappalainen, Jussi T. (1979). "Finland och Carl X Gustafs Ryska Krig". In Stade, Arne (ed.). Kriget på östfronten [The War on the Eastern Front] (in Swedish). Militärhistoriska förlaget. ISBN 9789185266098.
- Lappalainen, Jussi T. (1972). Kaarle X Kustaan Venäjän-sota v. 1656-1658 Suomen suunnalla [Charles X Gustav's Russian War of 1656-1658 on the Finnish side] (in Finnish). University of Jyväskylä. ISBN 9789516770263.
- Essen, Michael Fredholm von (2023). Charles X's Wars: Volume 3 - The Danish Wars, 1657-1660. Helion & Company. ISBN 9781915113603.
- Englund, Peter (2000). Den oövervinnerlige: om den svenska stormaktstiden och en man i dess mitt [The invincible: about the era of Swedish great power and a man in its midst] (in Swedish). Atlantis. ISBN 9789174869996.
