= Battle of Aa =

Russo-Swedish battle

- Part of the Russo-Swedish War (1656–1658)
| Date | 2 August 1656 |
| Location | Aa, Livonia |
| Result | See § Aftermath |

Belligerents
| (yes) Swedish Empire | Tsardom of Russia |

Commanders and leaders
| (Swedish Empire) Streiff (Swedish Empire) Aderkas (Swedish Empire) Mengden (WIA) (Swedish Empire) Stackelberg (WIA) | (Tsardom of Russia) Denis Fonvizin (Tsardom of Russia) Semyon Izmailov (WIA) |

Units involved
| Unknown | Unknown |

Strength
| 350–380 cavalry | 1,200–3,500 men |

Casualties and losses
| 6 killed 3 wounded | 4 killed 36 wounded 1 captured |

The battle of Aa (Swedish: Slaget vid Aa; Russian: Битва на Аа) occurred on 2 August 1656 during the early stages of the Russo-Swedish War of 1656–1658. Swedish forces under command Generalmajor Streiff faced 1,200–3,500 Russian troops under stolnik Semyon Izmailov. It is impossible to establish how the battle ended, because the attitudes of both sides contradict each other.

== Background ==
Amid the early stages of the Russo-Swedish War of 1656–1658, Magnus De la Gardie ordered Major General Streiff to focus his attention on Embach, Dorpat, and Aa, along with making sure that the Swedish retreat towards Riga was not cut off. Doing the first and last tasks were difficult, and De la Gardie did not send even a small force to northern Livonia.

Streiff did not realize the necessity of gathering his men to march north and instead chose to go towards the Livonian mountain ranges in the middle of the province, to avoid being cut off from Marienburg and smaller fortresses in the province.

During Streiff's withdrawal, a division of the Russian army followed Streiff and pushed him further towards the west. From Mentzen, Streiff sent a reconnaissance force of 150 cavalry and 50 dragoons under Major Mengden and Colonel Leonard von Vietinghoff. The force encountered 300 Russian dragoons and cossacks, who were forced to retreat, suffering 40 killed and 2 captured.

== Battle ==
Streiff continued marching towards Wolmar, but he was attacked at Aa on 2 August by the Russians. According to the report sent to Magnus Gabriel De la Gardie, these forces consisted of 3,500; more modern estimates believe that there were 1,200 to 2,000. Swedes had 350–380 cavalry. Further descriptions of the battle vary according to sources, according to Streif's reports colonel Aderkas, commanding the Swedish vanguard, quickly forced the Russians back into a nearby pass. However, the Russians continued their attack four times, being forced back each time. Afterwards, Streiff finally arranged his men in battle formation on the open field and offered battle to the Russians, who accepted, forming a line opposite the Swedes. Using the narrow space to his advantage, Streiff immediately attacked the Russians, and after the first volley, the Russians were thrown into disorder, and in the subsequent withdrawal through the pass, they suffered heavy casualties.

According to Russian reports, the Russians "beat up many Swedes" and seized the wagon train. The Russians lost 4 killed, 36 wounded, and 1 prisoner, the latter is mentioned only in Swedish sources. The Swedes lost some 6 killed in the fighting according to a report by Magnus De la Gardie. Modern sources also differ in their assessment of the battle. Historians Alexey Lobin and Nikolai Smirnov claim that the Swedes were forced to retreat after a short skirmish, but Oleg Kurbatov claims that the Swedes repulsed the attack at the cost of losing the baggage train.

== Aftermath ==
Swedes claimed the alleged death of the Russian commander and the capture of 9 banners, which is not mentioned in Russian sources. Semyon Artemovich Izmailov was wounded in the battle. The Swedes also suffered some wounded, including Major Mengden, who was shot through his body, a quartermaster, and a certain Stackelberg, who was wounded in the head.

== Works cited ==
- Kurbatov, Oleg (2018). Русско-Шведская война 1656-1658 [Russo-Swedish War of 1656-1658] (in Russian). Moscow: Runivers.ru.
- Fagerlund, Rainer (1979). Stade, Arne (ed.). Kriget på östfronten [The War on the Eastern Front] (in Swedish). Militärhistoriska förlaget. ISBN 9789185266098.
- Carlon, Manfred (1903). Ryska kriget 1656-1658 [The Russian War 1656–1658] (in Swedish). Centraltryckeriet.
