= Siege of Dyneburg =

1656 siege

- Part of Second Northern War / Russo-Swedish War (1656–1658)
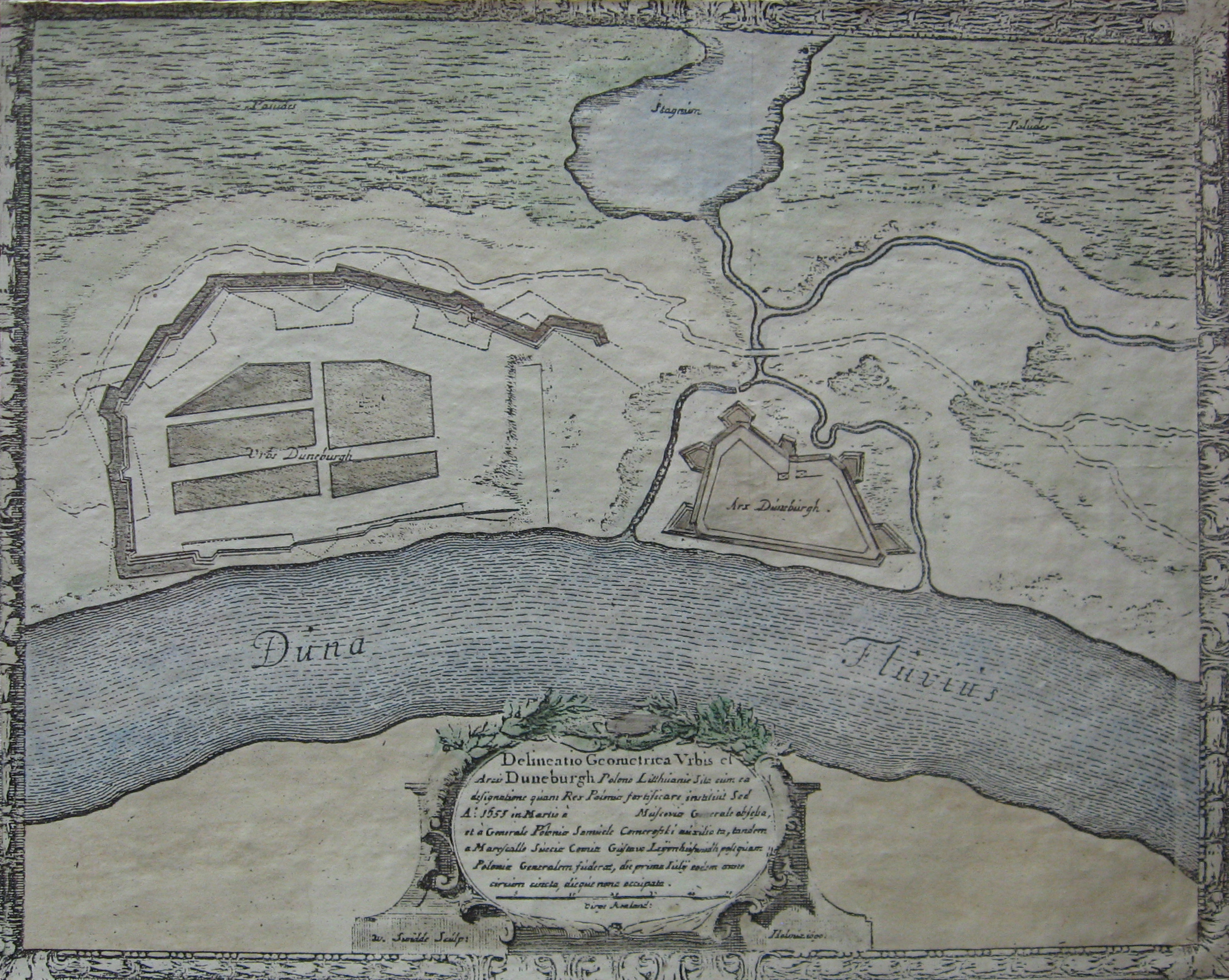
- Dyneburg, now Daugavpils, in 1655.
Date	18–31 July 1656
Location	Dyneburg 55°53′00″N 26°30′00″E
Result	Russian victory
Territorial changes	Dyneburg is captured by the Russians

Belligerents
Swedish Empire	Tsardom of Russia

Commanders and leaders
(Swedish Empire) Johan Willichman †	(Tsardom of Russia) Aleksey Mikhailovich

Units involved
(Swedish Empire) Dyneburg garrison	(Tsardom of Russia) Unknown

Strength
Unknown	3,400

Casualties and losses
Entire Garrison killed	
- Location within Latvia

The siege of Dyneburg by the Russian Army under Tsar Alexei Mikhailovich was one of the first events of the Russo-Swedish War (1656–1658), a theater of the Second Northern War.

The siege began on 18 July 1656. One night in early August, the Russian bombardment caused a fire in the grain reserves of the stronghold. Consequently, some of the garrison had to leave the defences to begin putting it down. The Russians took advantage by immediately storming the fortifications and after a two hour fight, secured a victory. The commandant of the fort, Johan Willichman, took the Swedish flag with him and jumped into the fire. The rest of the defenders as well as all males present in the stronghold were slaughtered.

After capturing Dyneburg (Dünaburg, Daugavpils), Tsar Alexei Mikhailovich ordered the building of an Eastern Orthodox Church and the renaming of the city as Borisoglebsk. The capture of Dynaburg was followed by the capture of Kokenhusen.

== Bibliography ==
- Николай Шефов. Битвы России. Военно-историческая библиотека. М., 2002
