= Treaty of Cardis =

1661 peace treaty ending the Russo-Swedish War

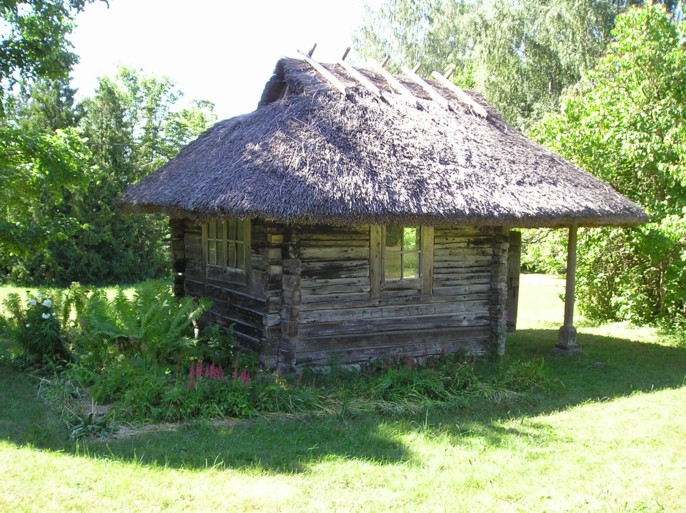
Small house near the Kärde Manor, where according to the folklore the treaty was signed

The Treaty of Cardis was a peace settlement made in 1661 between the Tsardom of Russia and the Swedish Empire. This particular agreement ended the Russo-Swedish War of 1656–1658. It took place in Cardis Manor (now Kärde) in Estonia. Based on the terms of the treaty, Russia surrendered to Sweden all captured territories. Moreover, all vessels constructed at Kokenhausen (Latvian: Koknese, Russian: Tsarevich-Dmitriev) for the failed Russian siege of Riga were destroyed (the vessels were constructed in a shipyard founded by a boyar named Afanasy Ordin-Nashchokin). Overall, the Peace of Cardis maintained the territorial accords of the Treaty of Stolbovo.

== See also ==
- List of treaties
