= Siege of Nyenschantz (1656) =

Siege of Nyenschanz
- Part of the Russo-Swedish War (1656–1658)
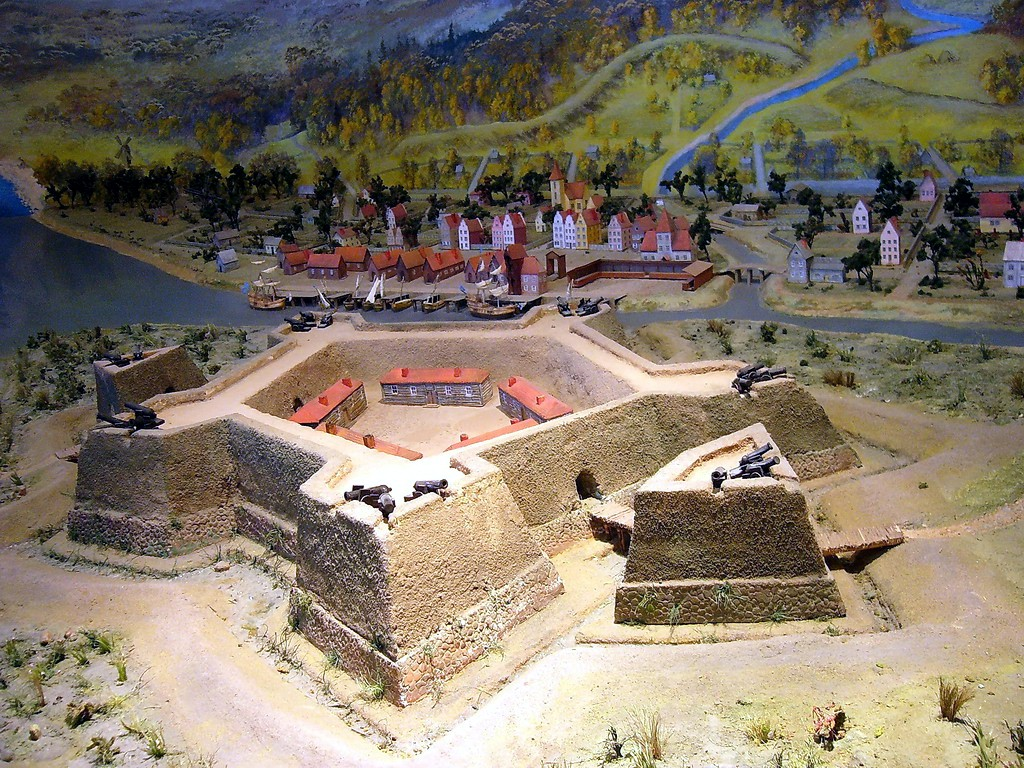
- Model of the fortress
Date	June, 1656
Location	Russia
Result	Russian victory

Belligerents
Swedish Empire	Tsardom of Russia

Commanders and leaders
Unknown	(Tsardom of Russia) Pyotr Potemkin

Units involved
(Swedish Empire) Nyenschanz garrison	(Tsardom of Russia) Unknown

Strength
Unknown	1,000

The fortress of Nyenschantz or Nienschanz, later Schlotburg, was founded by the Swedish King Charles IX in 1611, on lands that were annexed from Russia under the pretext of not fulfilling the Vyborg Treatise.

In June 1656, the Russian voivode Pyotr Ivanovich Potemkin with a detachment of 1,000 people took Nyenschantz by storm, but after the war, both the fortress and the surrounding territories remained in Sweden.

The fortress was taken by the Russians under Peter the Great, after a week of siege on May 12, 1703 (during the Great Northern War). The city was renamed Schlotburg ("castle-town").
