= Attack on Taipale =

Swedish attack in 1656

- Part of the Russo-Swedish War (1656–1658)
Date	18 June, 1656
Location	Taipale, Ingria
Result	Swedish victory
Territorial changes	Taipale is razed

Belligerents
(yes) Swedish Empire	Tsardom of Russia

Commanders and leaders
(Swedish Empire) Berendt Gröön (Swedish Empire) Reinhold Johan von Hagen	Unknown

Units involved
Unknown	(Tsardom of Russia) Taipale garrison

Strength
100 cavalry and dragoons	200 men

Casualties and losses
4 killed Several wounded	Many killed

The Attack on Taipale (Swedish: Motanfallet mot Taipale; Finnish: Vastahyökkäys Taipaleeseen; Russian: Контратака на Тайпале) was a successful Swedish attack on Russian-occupied Taipale in June of 1656, during the Russo-Swedish War (1656–1658).

== Background ==
On June 13, some 350, possible 538, conscripted peasants, along with some 100 cavalry and dragoons, marched from Viborg towards Taipale under the command of Major Berthold Daumb, who had previously served with the Karelian Dragoon regiment. They intended to utilize the peasants in future Swedish operations; however, after a report came in that claimed the Russians had a strong cavalry force, the peasants were ordered to retreat to spare them.

Instead, on the following day, only Berendt Gröön's cavalry and Reinhold Johan von Hage's dragoons were sent to Taipale. The choice of location is unclear from the primary sources, although it was the nearest place where Russian troops were known to be present. Their strength had been estimated to be some 200 men.

== Attack ==
The Swedes left Viborg on 14 June, and after getting close to Taipale, they received information that Potemkin and most of his men had returned to Shlisselburg, and consequently, only around 80 of his men remained in the city, along with the burghers. Gröön and Hage attacked the city during the early hours of 18 June, when most of the defenders were asleep. However, the subsequent noise woke them up, and they fired at the Finns from behind the toll fence and fortified themselves in the houses inside the city. During the fighting, Gröön lost one corporal and two men, and Hage lost one of his dragoons.

In order to drive the defenders out, the Swedish forces set the town on fire, forcing the civilians and Russians to flee towards their boats. Some were killed, others died in the fires, and some, including the Mayor of Taipale, Vasili Lobanov, who escaped from a fenced house by the edge of the water, reached boats that managed to take them to Lake Ladoga and eventually to the safety of the troops in Shlisselburg.

== Aftermath ==
Gröön and Hagen's force had now achieved an initial victory. Apart from four dead, their losses included a few seriously wounded. On 20 June, they returned to Viborg, leaving Taipale destroyed and unoccupied.

== Works cited ==
- Lappalainen, Jussi T. (1979). Stade, Arne (ed.). Kriget på östfronten [The War on the Eastern Front] (in Swedish). Militärhistoriska förlaget. p. 52. ISBN 9789185266098.
- Lappalainen, Jussi T. (1972). Kaarle X Kustaan Venäjän-sota v. 1656-1658 Suomen suunnalla (in Finnish). University of Jyväskylä. pp. 128–129. ISBN 9789516770263.
