= Pyotr Potemkin =

Russian nobleman and politician (1617–1700)

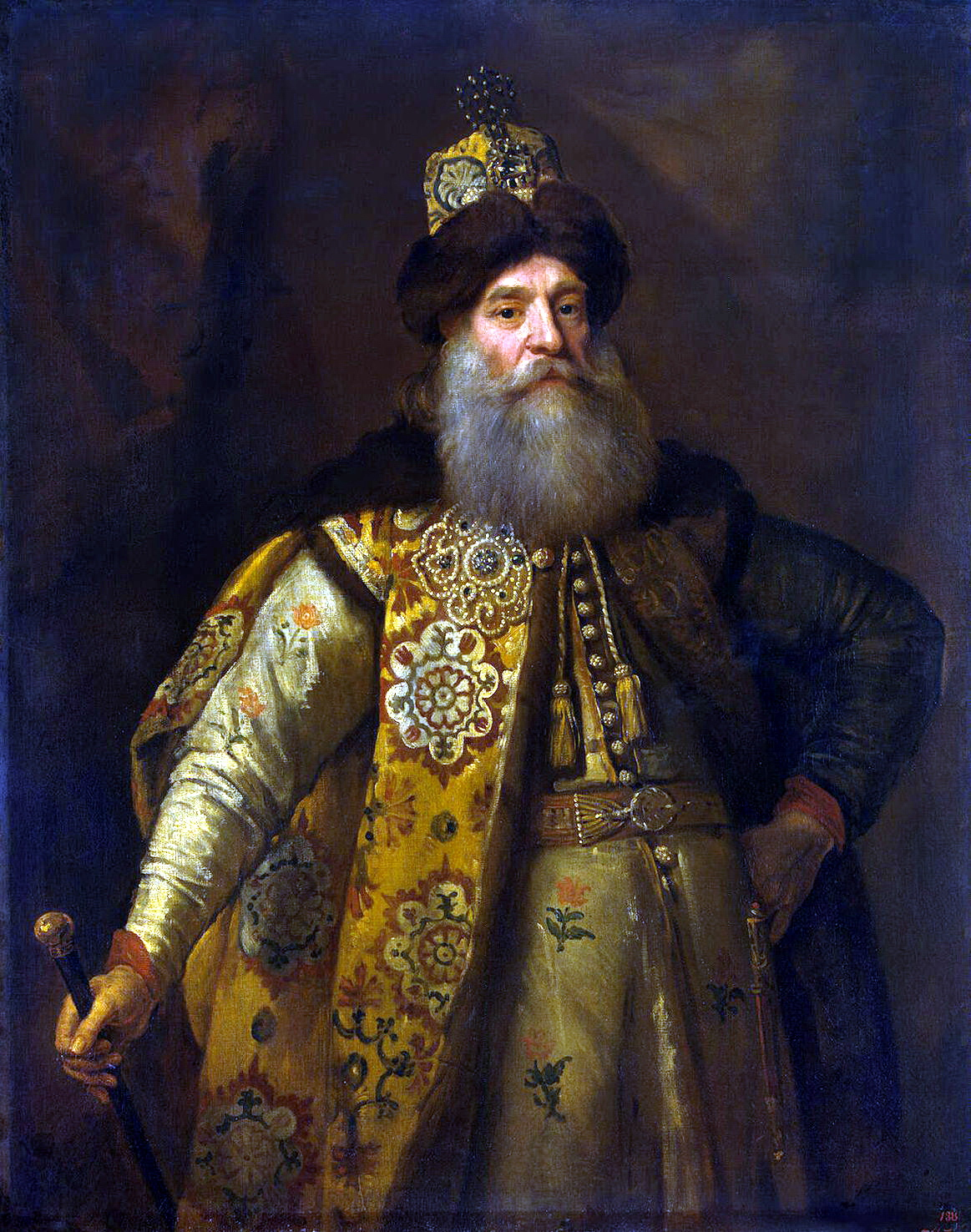
Pyotr Potemkin by Godfrey Kneller

Pyotr Ivanovich Potemkin (Russian: Пётр Ива́нович Потёмкин; 1617–1700), also spelled Potyomkin, was a Russian courtier, diplomat and namestnik of Borovsk during the reigns of tsars Alexis I and Feodor III. He was a voivode during the Russo-Polish War (1654–1667) and took Lublin in 1655 and laid siege to Nyenschantz and Noteborg in 1656. Later he became a stolnik working as the tsar's ambassador.

== Service ==
Potemkin led the embassy to Spain and France between 1667 and 1668. This embassy established regular diplomatic relations between Russia and Spain. A colorful portrait of Pyotr Potemkin by Spanish painter Juan Carreño de Miranda is on display in Museo del Prado in Madrid. During his envoy to France he introduced a new term, Avgardent (Авгардент), into the Russian diplomatic vocabulary. The term meant "distilled spirits", especially Cognacs and Armagnacs. Potemkin considered them harmful and advocated a complete ban on their import to Russia.

He travelled to Vienna in 1674 to discuss common actions against Polish king John III Sobieski. He also was the envoy of Feodor III to France and England in 1681. He died in 1700 in the rank of an okolnichy.

== Legend ==
According to legend, Pyotr Potemkin, as a diplomat, had an eccentric sense of national pride. During his negotiations in Madrid he insisted that the King of Spain take off his hat every time Potemkin mentioned the title of Tsar of All Russias. During his embassy to Copenhagen, the Danish king was ill and could receive Potemkin only lying in bed. Potemkin insisted that the Danes bring a second bed into the chamber and conducted all the talks lying down, thus showing the equality between the countries.

Famous Russian statesman Prince Grigory Potemkin was a distant relative.
