= Augdov expedition =

Failed Swedish expedition to Gdov

- Part of the Russo-Swedish War (1656–1658)
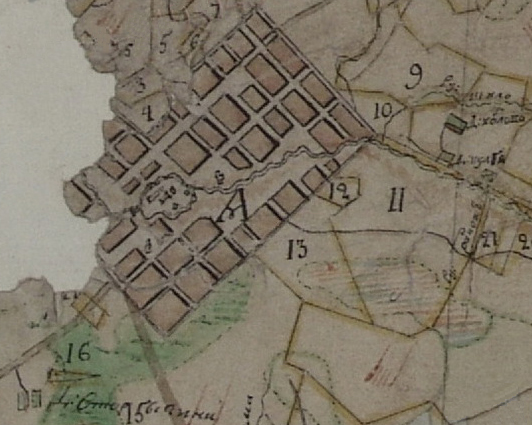
- Plan of Gdov from the late 18th century
Date	10–16 September, 1657
Location	Gdov
Result	Russian victory

Belligerents
(yes) Swedish Empire	Tsardom of Russia

Commanders and leaders
(yes) Magnus Gabriel De la Gardie (yes) Fredrik Löwe (yes) Reinhold Glassenap	Ivan Khovansky; Timophei Shcherbatov; Bogdan Ivanovich Nashchokin

Units involved
(yes) 52 cavalry companies (yes) 20 dragoon companies (yes) 4 Infantry companies	(Tsardom of Russia) Gdov garrison

Strength
2,870–3,000 men 10 guns	At Gdov; 1,500 cavalry 300–500 streltsy During the retreat 6,000 men

Casualties and losses
See losses	See losses

The Augdov expedition (Swedish: Augdov-expeditionen) was a failed Swedish offensive directed at the city of Augdov (Gdov) in 1657 during the Russo-Swedish War (1656–1658).

== Background ==
Charles X Gustav, in an attempt to end the-then ongoing war with Russia, started plans for what would be the only major offensive by Sweden during the war. The plans would emerge in mid-June when the king informed Magnus Gabriel De la Gardie about an upcoming war with Denmark, with the planned offensive being to make the enemy "more reasonable".

During the same time, Gustav Evertsson Horn was ordered to assist the expedition with troops from Finland, and orders were repeatedly sent to De la Gardie in July and August to carry it out. In August, De la Gardie prepared for the expedition, and by 4 September, when the king's orders from late July and early August had arrived, he was in Narva with his forces, two cavalry regiments and one squadron of dragoons. The troops from Finland, six cavalry and four dragoon companies, had also arrived there. De la Gardie relied on more support from Horn, but he had moved north to meet a Russian attack.

Therefore, De la Gardie commanded his main force, under General Lieutenant Löwe to Wask-Narva, which had been chosen as the crossing point for the Swedes. In eastern Livonia, only Estonian militias and a dragoon squadroon had been left to monitor the Russian activities in Dorpat. Colonel Toll was also commanded to go to Wolmar with his cavalry.

In total, the forces De la Gardie had at his disposal accounted to 2,870–2,970 or 3,000 men, consisting of some 52 cavalry companies, which had 1,670–1,770 men, 20 dragoon companies, which had some 950 men, and four infantry companies with 250 men. He also had field artillery, with some 8 three-pounders and 2 six-pounders.

== Expedition ==
On 10 September, the Swedes crossed the River Narva, establishing a camp at Politjna, a few miles south of Wask-Narva. The following day, they would reach Gdov without meeting much resistance, which was defended by some 1,500 cavalry and 300–500 streltsy according to Swedish estimates. The Swedes burned the suburbs of the city, along with villages encountered along their march. Negotiations with the Russians turned fruitless over the next few days, and the commander, Bogdan Ivanovich Nashchokin refused to surrender. Moreover, as reinforcements arrived under Ivan Khovansky, De la Gardie, after a meeting with his council of war, and having not intended for a siege, decided to order a retreat back to the camp at Politjna. Soon, however, it was decided to retreat all the way to Wask-Narva.

Magnus Gabriel De la Gardie, the Swedish commander

The Swedish retreat began on 16 September, and initially went according to their plan. Company after company retreated without Russian interference. However, when only a few companies remained, the Russians launched an assault, quickly creating chaos among the Swedes. Colonel Reinhold Glassenap managed to rally some of the forces, and managed to hold off the Russians assaulting the rearguard of the Swedish troops with artillery, and after several hours of fighting, the Russians withdrew. In his insecurity, De la Gardie did not wish to know the true strength of the Russians, only assuming that they were numerous, basing it off the amount of campfires, and because they had dared to engage in a skirmish, although they had estimated the size to be some 6,000 men. The disorganized Swedes finally arrived at Wask-Narva on 16 September, with reports to the government being notably sparse on the details of the retreat.

=== Losses ===
==== Swedish losses ====
Swedish losses are reported to have been around 150–160 men, although a proposal drafted on 8 October in Reval, claimed that 249 cavalrymen and 57 dragoons had died, and it is unclear where these numbers came from. Additionally, 181 cavalry men and 81 dragoons had deserted.

However, according to the Russian commander Ivan Khovansky, who had led the Russian troops along with Timophei Shcherbatov, the Swedes had lost 2 generals, 3 colonels, 22 officers, 800 cavalrymen, and the entire Infantry force of 2,700 men. Modern Russian sources estimate the Swedish losses at 400 people killed, many wounded and captured, about 1,000 in total, while indicating that the Swedish commander was also wounded.

According to other historians, both sides greatly exaggerated the other's losses. Other historians put the Swedish losses as very heavy, noting the dispute in the exact amount between different sources.

==== Russian losses ====
Russian losses were reported as 24 killed and 148 wounded, although the Swedes estimated that "well over" 400 Russians had been killed in the fighting.

== Aftermath ==
The Swedish troops stayed in Wask-Narva for a few days, and they reorganized. Later, they received reports about a Russian force that had the day after the retreat gone over the Narva River north of Wask-Narva. Responding to the threat, the Swedes retreated further, going to Reval.

== Works cited ==
- Fagerlund, Rainer (1979). Stade, Arne (ed.). Kriget på östfronten [The War on the Eastern Front] (in Swedish). Militärhistoriska förlaget. ISBN 9789185266098.
- Carlon, Manfred (1903). Ryska kriget 1656-1658 [The Russian War 1656–1658] (in Swedish). Centraltryckeriet.
- Kurbatov, Oleg (2018). Русско-Шведская война 1656-1658 [Russo-Swedish War of 1656-1658] (in Russian).
- Essen, Michael Fredholm von (2023). Charles X's Wars: Volume 3 - The Danish Wars, 1657-1660. Helion & Company. ISBN 9781915113603.
- Isacson, Claes-Göran (2015). Karl X Gustavs krig: Fälttågen i Polen, Tyskland, Baltikum, Danmark och Sverige 1655-1660 [Wars of Charles X Gustav: The campaigns in Poland, Germany, the Baltics, Denmark and Sweden 1655-1660] (in Swedish). Historiska Media. ISBN 9789175450117.
- Sundberg, Ulf (2010). Sveriges krig 1630-1814 [Sweden's wars 1630–1814] (in Swedish). Svenskt militärhistoriskt bibliotek. ISBN 9789185789634.
