= Storm of Kokenhusen =

1656 battle

- Part of Second Northern War / Russo-Swedish War (1656–1658)
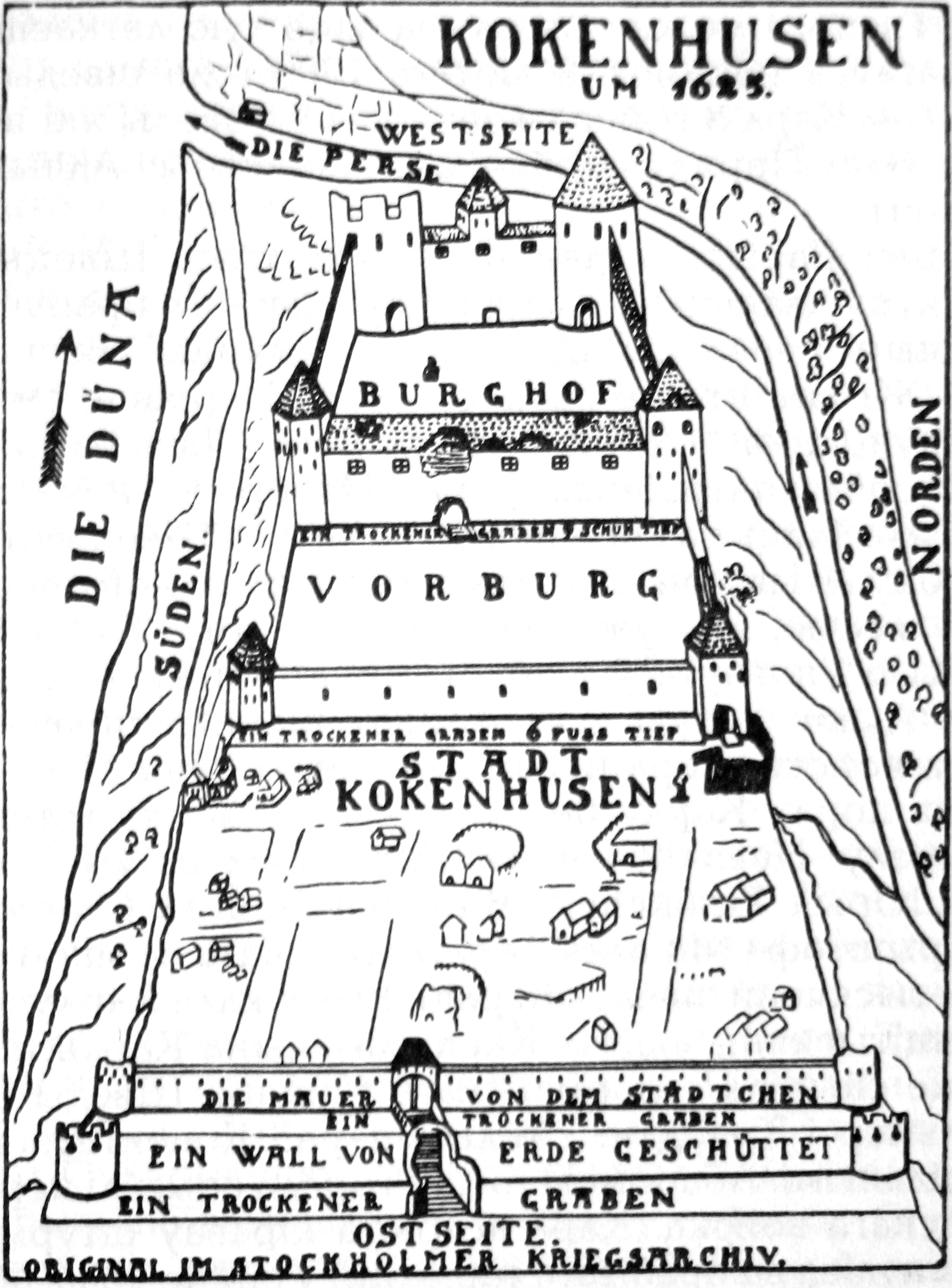
- A drawing of Kokenhusen and its fortress about 30 years prior to the storming.
Date	14 August 1656
Location	Kokenhusen 56°38′17″N 25°25′03″E
Result	Russian victory
Territorial changes	Russia gains control of the Daugava River

Belligerents
Swedish Empire	Tsardom of Russia

Commanders and leaders
(Swedish Empire) Magnus De la Gardie	(Tsardom of Russia) Aleksey Mikhailovich

Strength
300	2,500

Casualties and losses
300	67 killed 430 wounded

The Storm of Kokenhusen by the Russian Army under Tsar Alexei Mikhailovich was one of the first events of the Russo-Swedish War (1656–1658), a theater of the Second Northern War. On 14 August 1656 Russian troops stormed and captured the well-fortified town of Kokenhusen (Koknese) in Swedish Livonia (present-day Latvia)

According to the Tsar, this town “was very strong, had a deep moat, like a small brother of the Kremlin's moat, and its fortress is like a son of Smolensk's fortress”. Tsar also gave city new name, "Tsarevich-Dmitriev" (Russian: Царевич-Дмитриев) in honor of his infant son, Tsarevich Dmitry Alexeyevich of Russia, who had died in 1649. This new name didn't last since in 1681 city was returned to Swedish Livonia. After capturing Kokenhusen, Russia gained control of the Daugava River and the way to Riga was opened.
