= Strug (boat) =

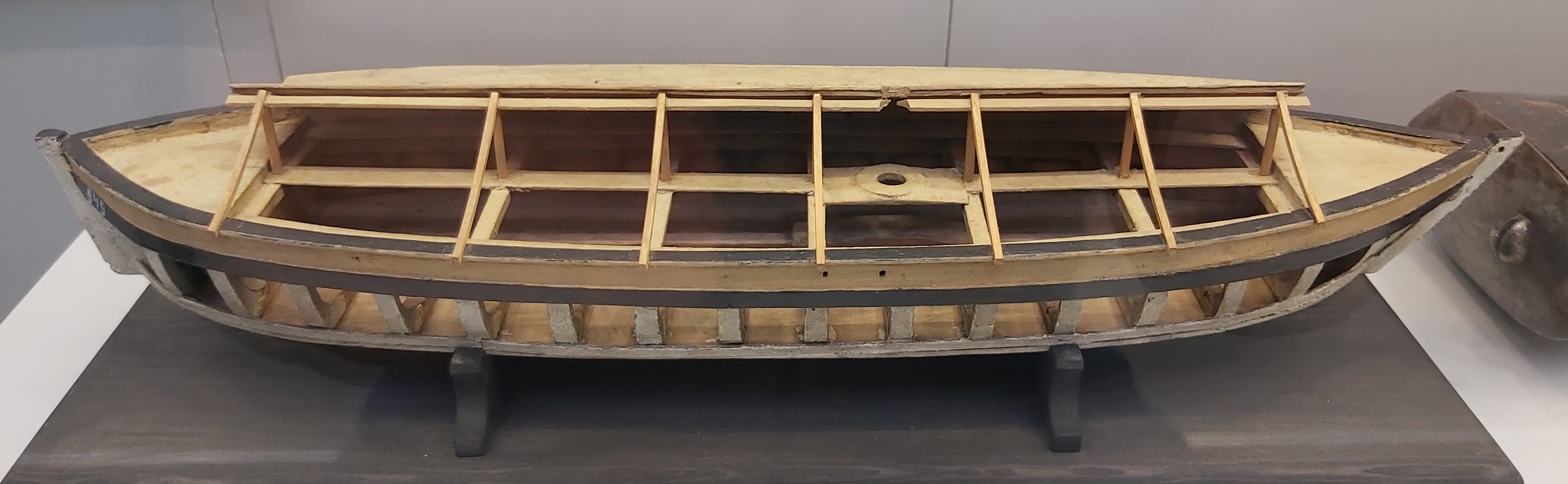
Strug

A Strug is a type of flat-bottomed boat which was in use primarily in Russia from the 11th - 18th centuries, for the transport of people and cargo as well as military uses. Designs varied somewhat between different regions of Russia, with typical parameters being a length of 20–45 meters, a width of 4–10 meters, and from 6-20 oars. In some cases both the bow and stern were similarly pointed. Many were equipped with a removable mast and small straight sail, which could be used when the wind permitted, and some models also had a small cabin.

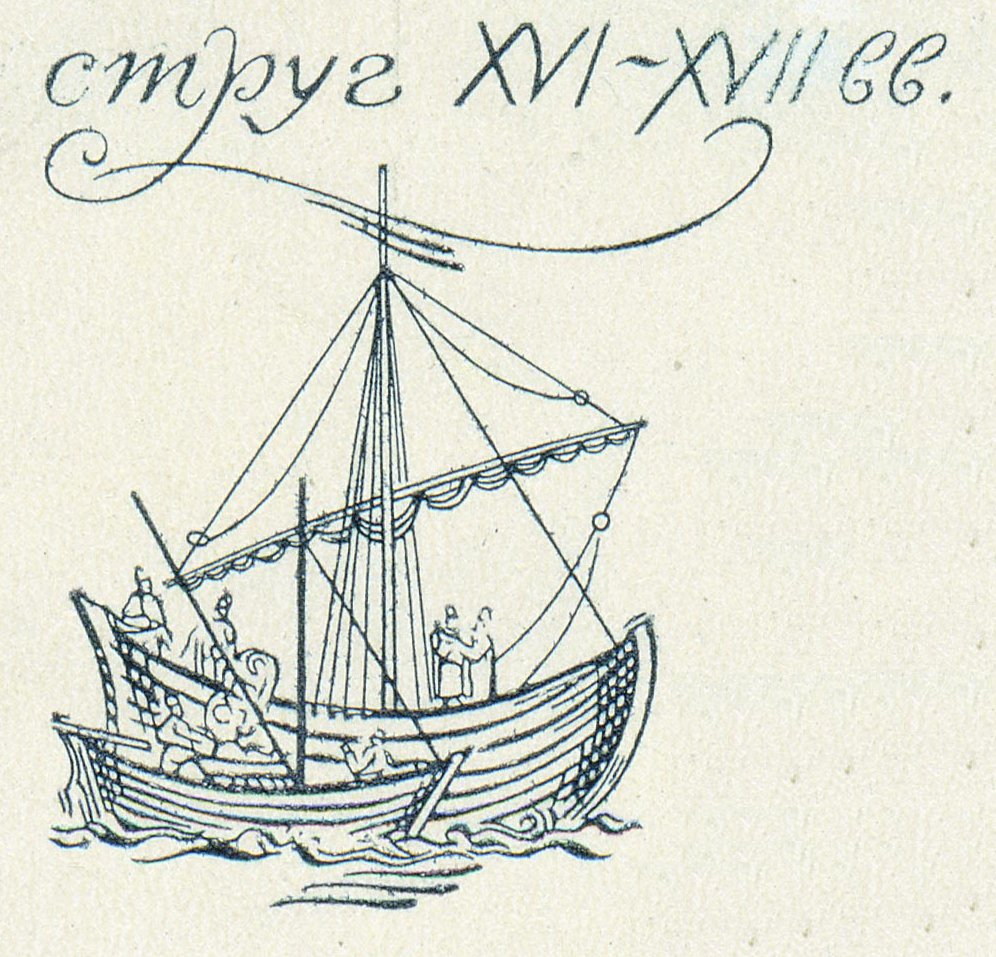
Detail of a 1987 Soviet Union postage stamp depicting a strug of the 16th - 17th centuries.

== History ==
The first recorded mention of a strug occurs in the early Russian legal code Russkaya Pravda (Русская правда) of 1054. They were used on rivers, lakes and seas, for both civil and military purposes. In the 16th - 17th centuries, they were used to protect river trade routes from robbers, for which task they were equipped with several small cannons. It is documented that in 1240 the army of the great Novgorod prince Alexander Nevsky reached the location of the Swedes on fast vessels of this type.

In preparation for the second Azov campaign of the Russo-Turkish War in the winter of 1696, large-scale construction of ships for a new Russian Navy was begun in Voronezh and Preobrazhensky, including 522 strugas. The ships were delivered to Voronnezh in disassembled form, then assembled and launched. The industrial construction of strugas was implemented under Peter I, by his decree of December 28, 1715. In 1722, he made a round trip from Moscow to Nizhny Novgorod and Astrakhan on the Muscovets, a strug equipped with 18 rows of oars.

Sometimes underwater archaeologists find remnants of strugas.
