= Afanasy Ordin-Nashchokin =

Russian politician (1605–1680)

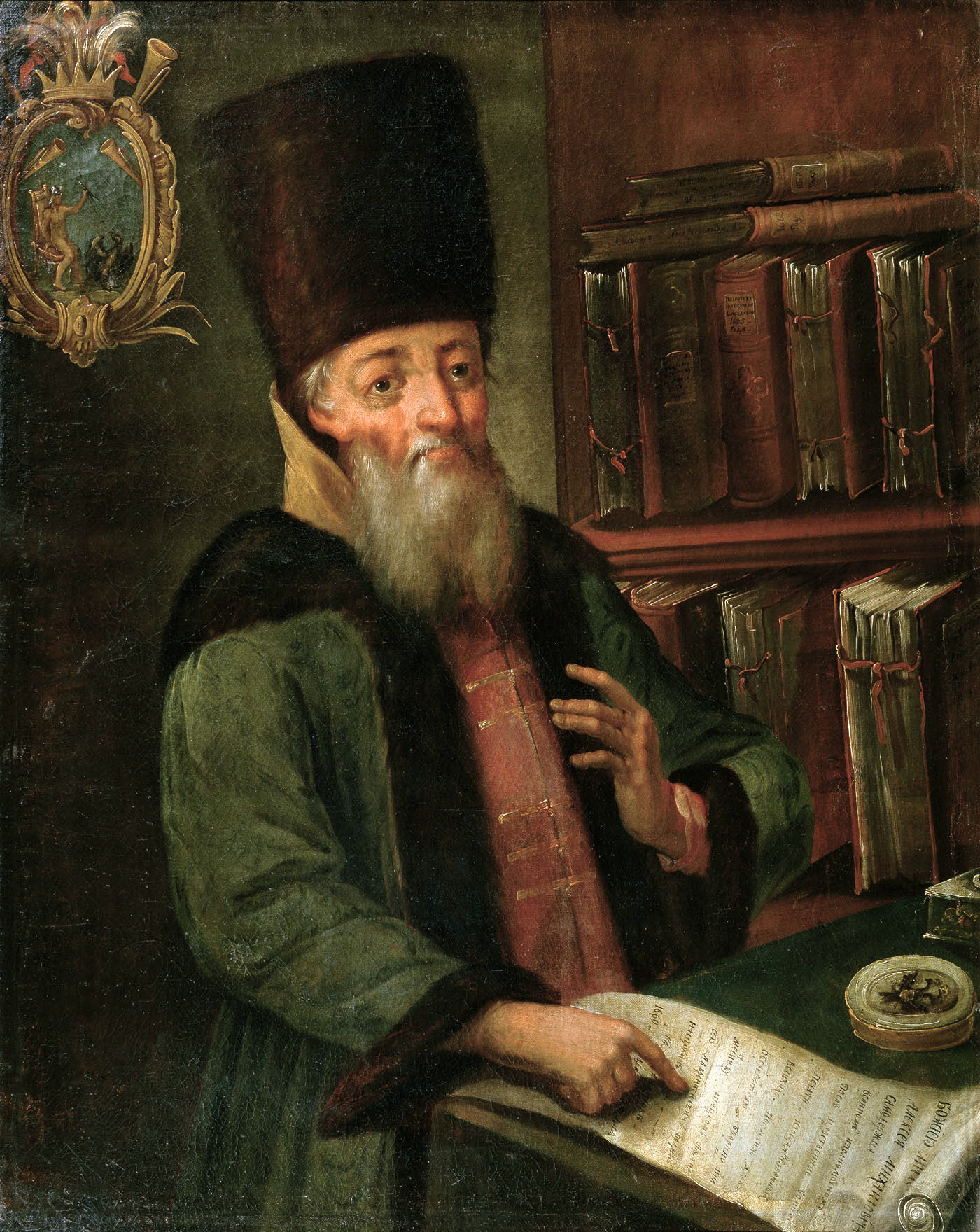
Afanasy Ordin-Nashchokin

Afanasy Lavrentievich Ordin-Nashchokin (Russian: Афанасий Лаврентьевич Ордин-Нащокин; 1605–1680) was a Russian statesman. He was a diak of the posolsky prikaz (foreign ministry). He was the first junior noble to attain the boyar title and highest offices of state not as a result of family connections but due to his personal capabilities and achievements.

== Early life and career ==
Afanasy Ordin-Nashchokin was the son of a poor official from Pskov, who saw to it that his son was taught Latin, German and mathematics. Ordin-Nashchokin began his public career in 1642 as one of the officials involved in determining the new Russo-Swedish frontier after the Treaty of Stolbovo. By that time, he had gained a reputation in Russia as having a thorough understanding of "German ways and things". He was one of the first Russians who diligently collected foreign books; according to one source as many as sixty-nine Latin works were sent to him at one time from abroad.

Ordin-Nashchokin attracted the attention of the young Tsar Alexis because of his resourcefulness during the Pskov rebellion of 1650, which he succeeded in bringing under control through his personal efforts. At the beginning of the Russo-Swedish War (1656–1658), he was appointed to a high command, in which he displayed strong capabilities.

== Diplomatic missions ==
In 1657, Ordin-Nashchokin was appointed minister plenipotentiary to treat with the Swedes on the Narva River. He was regarded as the only Russian statesman of the day with sufficient foresight to grasp the fact that the Baltic seaboard, or even a part of it, was worth more to Russia than ten times the same amount of territory in Lithuania, and, despite opposition from a number of his colleagues, in December 1658 he succeeded in concluding a three-year Treaty of Valiesari whereby the Russians were left in possession of all their conquests in Livonia.

In 1660, Ordin-Nashchokin was sent as plenipotentiary to a second congress, to convert the truce of 1658 into a permanent peace. He advised that the truce with Sweden should be prolonged and Charles II of England was invited to mediate a northern peace. Finally he laid stress upon the importance of Livonia for the development of Russian trade. On being overruled he retired from the negotiations that led to the Treaty of Kardis.

Ordin-Nashchokin was the chief plenipotentiary at the abortive congress of Durovicha, which met in 1664, to end the Russo-Polish War (1654-1667). He negotiated the Truce of Niemieża and through his efforts Russia succeeded in concluding with Poland the advantageous Truce of Andrusovo (1667). On his return to Russia he was created a boyar of the first class and entrusted with the direction of the Foreign Office, with the title of Guardian of the great Tsarish Seal and Director of the great Imperial Offices. He was, in fact, the first Russian chancellor.

== Later life and achievements ==
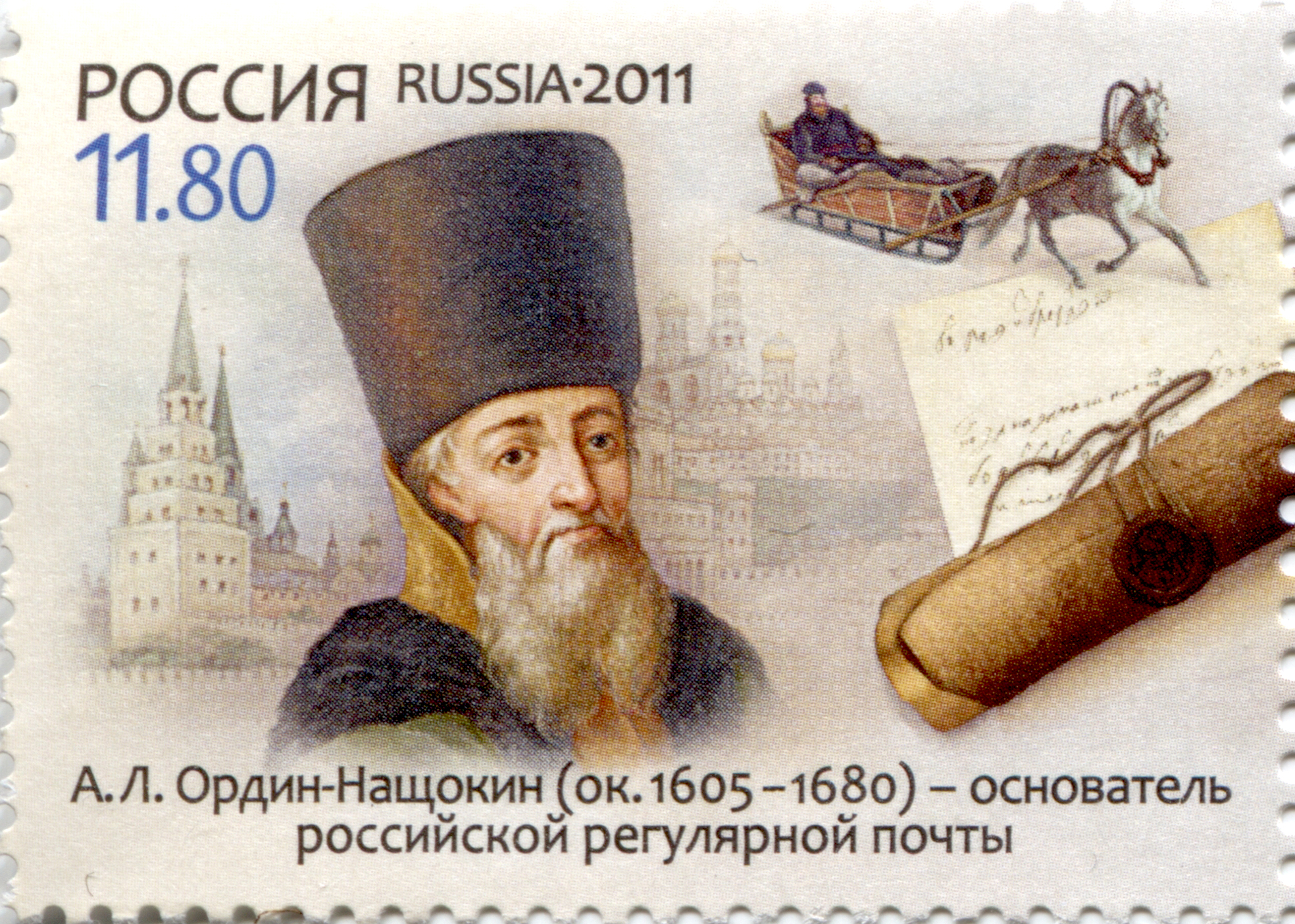
Afanasy Ordin-Nashchokin sets a postal system in Russia. The stamp of Russia, 2011

It was Ordin-Nashchokin who first abolished the onerous system of tolls on exports and imports, and brought together Russian merchants with the aim of promoting direct commercial relations between Sweden and Russia. He also initiated a postal system between Russia, Courland and Poland, and introduced gazettes and bills of exchange into Russia. He is also associated with the building of the first Russian merchant-vessels on the Dvina and Volga.

During his career, Ordin-Nashchokin had to constantly struggle with narrow routine and personal jealousy on the part of many of the boyars and clerks of the council. He was last employed in the negotiations for confirming the Truce of Andrusovo (September 1669 – March 1670). In January 1671 he attended upon the tsar on the occasion of his second marriage; but in February 1671 he was dismissed, and withdrew to the Krypetsky monastery near his native Pskov. There Ordin-Nashchokin took the tonsure under the name of Antony, and occupied himself with charity until his death in 1680. According to an assessment in the 1911 Encyclopædia Britannica, "[h]e was absolutely incorruptible, thus standing, morally as well as intellectually, far above the level of his age."
