= Battle of Walk =

1657 Swedish-Russian battle

- Part of Russo-Swedish War (1656–1658)
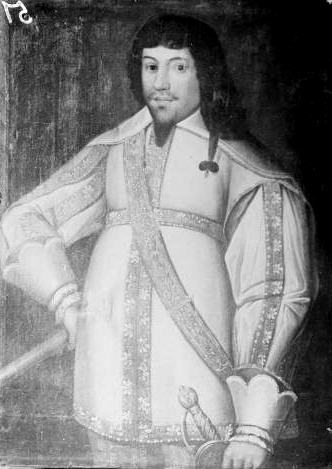
- Fredrik Löwe
Date	July 8, 1657
Location	Walk, Swedish Livonia 57°47′N 26°2′E
Result	Swedish victory

Belligerents
Swedish Empire	Tsardom of Russia

Commanders and leaders
(Swedish Empire) Fredrik Löwe (Swedish Empire) Tiesenhusen †	Matvey Sheremetev (POW) (Tsardom of Russia) Timofey Scherbatov (Tsardom of Russia) Denis Denisovich Fonvizin

Strength
3,300 men	2,193 (Russian sources); 8,000 (Swedish sources)

Casualties and losses
12 killed	108 killed, 28 wounded, 5 captured (Russian sources); 1,500 killed and wounded (Swedish sources)

The Battle of Walk on July 8, 1657 between forces of Sweden commanded by Friedrich von Löwen on one side, and Russian forces led by stolnik Matvey Sheremetyev, who for the first time in his career commanded an army by himself, on the other side. The largest part of the Russian army disobeyed Sheremetyev and left the battle at the beginning, forcing him to rely on the 250 reiters of Colonel Denis Fonvizin, who played the key role in the breakthrough and allowed the rest of the army to escape. The Swedish forces won the battle, and according to their sources they defeated an army of 8,000 men, 32 standards, banners and other field declarations had been captured in the battle and 1,500 Russians were dead or wounded along with their commander Matvey Sheremetyev, who later died in captivity. In comparison, some 12 Swedes, including Lieutenant Captain Tiesenhusen, were killed.

However, a recent analysis of Russian 17th-century archive documents related to the battle claims that Russian force consisted of only 2,193 men, 353 additional troops failed to arrive in time, and even Tsar Alexis I in his correspondence expected his army to be no larger than 3,000, while the casualties included 108 killed, 28 wounded, 5 captured. The Swedish declaration has been criticized by Oleg Kurbatov, as often tendentious and inaccurate in its description of the Russian army and having inflated numbers.

Before succumbing to his wounds in Swedish captivity, Sheremetyev had said that the task of his force was to force the Swedes to retreat either into Tallinn or Riga, to then loot and burn the land, creating a scorched earth buffer against the Swedes.
