= Russo-Swedish War (1656–1658) =

Theater of the 2nd Northern War

Russo-Swedish War of 1656–1658
- Part of the Second Northern War and a series of Russo-Swedish wars
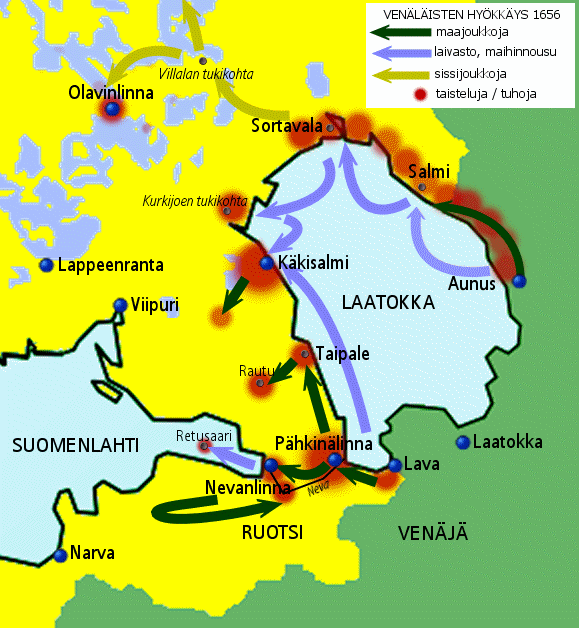
- Map of the struggle in Ingria
Date	July 1656–1658/1661 (Note: The war officially ended with the Treaty of Cardis in 1661)
Location	Livonia; Ingria; Estonia; Finland
Result	Swedish victory
Territorial changes	Treaty of Valiesar: Koknese, Aluksne, Dorpat, Nyslott ceded to Russia for three years; Treaty of Cardis: Russia returns the occupied Livonian territories; Tsar Alexis renounces his claims on Livonia; Tsar Alexis renounces his claims on Estonia; Swedish supremacy over the East Baltic established

Belligerents
Tsardom of Russia	(yes) Swedish Empire

Commanders and leaders
Alexei I; Ivan Khovansky; Matvey Sheremetev (POW)	(yes) Gustaf Adolf Lewenhaupt †; (yes) Magnus De la Gardie; (yes) Gustav Evertsson Horn; (yes) Fredrik Löwe

Strength
42,000–45,000	25,000

Casualties and losses
5,000–16,500 killed, wounded or captured	13,000 killed, wounded or captured

The Russo-Swedish War of 1656–1658, known as the War of Rupture, was fought by Russia and Sweden as a theater of the Second Northern War. It took place during a pause in the contemporary Russo-Polish War (1654–1667) as a consequence of the Truce of Vilna. Despite initial successes, Tsar Alexis of Russia failed to secure his principal objective—to revise the Treaty of Stolbovo, which had stripped Russia of the Baltic coast at the close of the Ingrian War. The war ended in a Swedish victory.

== Background ==
When Charles X Gustav of Sweden invaded Poland, captured Warsaw in June 1657 and announced his claims on the Russian occupations in the orbit of the Grand Duchy of Lithuania, Afanasy Ordin-Nashchokin (who led Russian diplomacy at the time) decided it was an opportune time to suspend hostilities against the weakened Polish–Lithuanian Commonwealth and to attack the rear of the Swedish Empire instead. To that end he opened negotiations and concluded a truce with Poland in summer 1656 (the Truce of Vilna, also known as the Truce of Niemież), a move which enraged a major ally of Russia, Ukrainian hetman Bohdan Khmelnytsky who maintained good relations with Sweden and was fighting against Poland.

== Campaigns ==
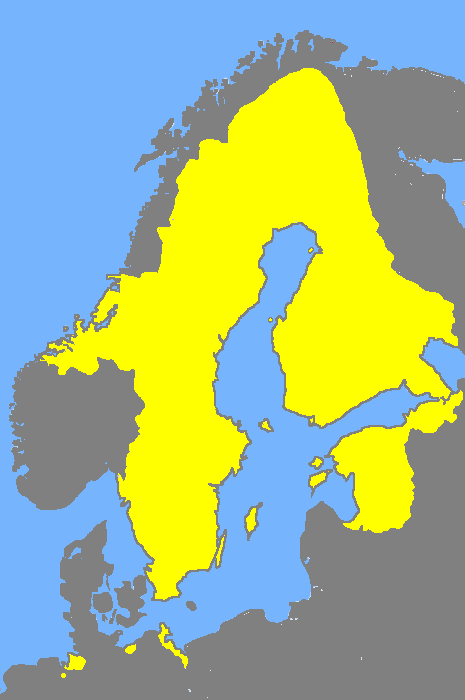
Boundaries of Sweden in 1658, during the time of the war.

In July, a reserve force of the Russian army struck across Swedish Ingria and overran two key Baltic fortresses — Nöteborg and Nyenschantz. A separate detachment under Aleksey Trubetskoy advanced on Dorpat (Tartu), which fell in October. The main forces marched along the bank of the Western Dvina towards Riga, taking Daugavpils and Koknese on their way. By the end of August, the capital of Livonia was besieged and bombarded.

As Russia had no full-fledged navy to intercept reinforcements coming to the Swedish garrison across the Baltic, Riga managed to hold out until October, when foreign officers commanding a small Russian flotilla defected to the other side and the Russians had to lift the siege. In the aftermath of this reverse, the Swedes recaptured much of Ingria, took the Pskov Monastery of the Caves and Fredrik Löwe inflicted a defeat on general Matvey Sheremetev at Walk (Valga) in 1657, but were eventually defeated by another Russian general, Ivan Khovansky, at Gdov, on 16 September 1657.

== Conclusion ==
By the end of 1658, Denmark was knocked out of the Northern Wars and the Ukrainian Cossacks under Khmelnytskyi's successor, Ivan Vyhovsky, allied themselves with Poland, changing the international situation drastically and inducing the tsar to resume the war against Poland as soon as possible. Under such circumstances, it was necessary to bring the Swedish adventure to a speedy end. On 20 December, Ordin-Nashchokin negotiated with Sweden the Treaty of Valiesar (Vallisaare), whereby Russia was allowed to keep the occupied territories in present-day Latvia and Estonia — Koknese, Aluksne, Dorpat, Nyslott — for three years.

When the term expired, Russia's military position in the Polish war had deteriorated to such a point that the tsar could not allow himself to be involved into a new conflict against powerful Sweden. His boyars had no other choice but to sign in 1661 the Treaty of Cardis (Kardis/Kärde), which obliged Russia to yield its occupied Livonian and Ingrian territories to Sweden, confirming the provisions of the Treaty of Stolbovo. This settlement was observed until the Great Northern War broke out in 1700.

== See also ==
- Siege of Riga (1656)
