= Cossack raids into Russia =

1500s–1600s Zaporozhian Cossack raids into Russia

- Part of Polish-Russian wars and Crimean-Nogai slave raids in Eastern Europe
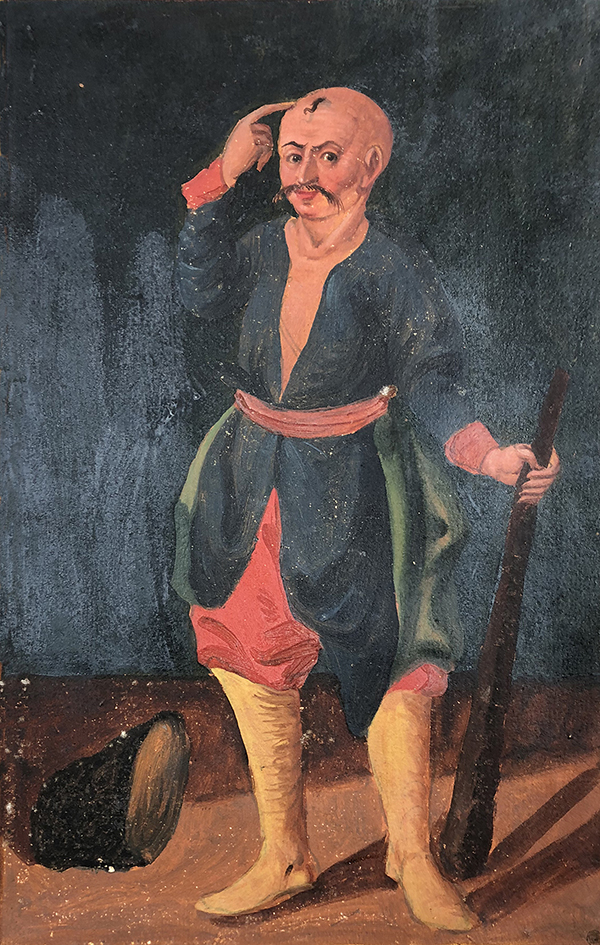
- Zaporozhian Cossack by Friedrich Wilhelm von Bergholz
Date	XVI–XVII centuries
Location	Primarily borderlands of Tsardom of Russia
Result	Devastation of the Russian lands; Severe damage to the Russian Tsardom; Some of the raiders settle on the Russian borderland and continue to loot the territories and fight with Russian forces

Belligerents
Zaporozhian Cossacks (Note: By the Russian government, the raiders were often labeled as the "thievish Cherkassians" (Russian: Воровские черкасы)); Grand Duchy of Lithuania; Polish–Lithuanian Commonwealth (Note: Some of the Cossack expeditions, particularly the 1589 one, the 1618 one and the 1633 one, were either carried out jointly or at least supported by the Commonwealth. Moreover, according to some sources, the Cossack incursions were backed by the Warsaw government.); Crimean Khanate; Don Cossacks (sometimes)	Tsardom of Russia: Sluzhiliye cherkasy (Note: Name of the Polish-Lithuanian subjects that were on the Russian service); Don Cossacks; Qasim Khanate (1618)

Commanders and leaders
Notable commanders: Jerzy Pac Ostap Dashkevych (Polish–Lithuanian Commonwealth) Michał Wiśniowiecki Ataman Sempskoy Denis Solepsky Ataman Husak Senka Kovpak (POW) (Polish–Lithuanian Commonwealth) Semen Lyko Petro Sahaidachny Fyodor Borispolets Mykhailo Doroshenko Tymofiy Orendarenko Dorofiy Doroshenko Fedir Pyrsky † Taras Fedorovych Yakiv Ostryanyn (Note: Led the Cossacks during the sieges of Valuyki and Belgorod) Rotmistr Overkovich † Hyria Kanevets †	Notable commanders: Ivan Andreyevich † Matviy Fedorov Vlas Yakovlev (POW) Semen Novgorodets (POW) Konstantin Myasnoy Ivan Khovanskiy Michael I of Russia Andrey Polyev † Ivan Khrushchev † Nikita Cherkassky (POW) Pyotr Danilov † Vasily Buturlin (executed) Grigoriy Volkonskiy (WIA) Afanasiy Gagarin Grigory Kaidalov Varfolomey Khitrovo Fyodor Buturlin Mikhail Shein (surrendered) (Note: Shein's army fought against the 12,000-strong Cossack unit during the siege of Smolensk in October of 1633 and participated in unsuccessful repelling of the Cossack attack on Dorogobuzh. Shein himself surrendered on 15 of February while being encircled by the Polish-Lithuanian-Cossack troops) Yakiv Ostryanyn † (Note: On the Russian service since 1638, killed by the Cossacks in 1641)

The Cossack raids into Russia, also referred as the Cherkassian invasions of Russia or Cherkassian raids into Russia, were a series of military expeditions by the Zaporozhian Cossacks into the Russian borderlands and beyond that took place from the end of the 1500s until the mid-1600s.

The raids often took place in a parallel with Cossack regiments joining the Russian service, with the main actions taking place in the end of the 1500s, when the "Cherkassians" were actively attacking Russian stanitsas and other settlements. Sometimes, the Cossacks carried full-scale attacks deep into the Russian territory, as happened during the campaigns of 1618 and 1633-1634 that are believed to have secured the Commonwealth victories in its wars against Muscovy in the mid-1600s. Cossack incursions played a significant role in the history of colonisation of the Wild Fields.

== Context ==
The Cossacks as a fighting force began to emerge around the year 1500; their appearance in the Wild Fields is deeply connected to the Lithuanian colonisation of the region. The early Cossack groups did not have a direct conflict with the Russia; however, some of their raids targeted the Russian convoys. Particularly, one of the first mentions of the word "Cossacks" is tied to the year 1489, when the people of Jerzy Pac attacked the Muscovite convoy near Tavan. Similar actions later took place in 1493 and 1497. The context of the Cossack incursions into Russian lands is often compared with the Cossack attacks on the Ottoman Empire and its vassals, as the Russian borderlands were one of the sources of loot, and the initial Ukrainian raids were nothing more than looting as well. However, some of their further invasions were a direct attempt to settle in Russian territories without pledging the allegiance to the Russian tsar. Some of the raiders managed to settle in the Russian borderlands, particularly the lands that would become known as Sloboda Ukraine later, but they were forced to fight against the Russian forces and loyal Cossacks; many of them were later expelled.

=== Timeline of the raids ===
The first Cossack attacks into the Russian territories were carried out by Ostap Dashkevych in an alliance with Crimean Khanate, particularly in 1515 and 1521. The first campaign was carried as a part of the ongoing Muscovite-Lithuanian wars and ended in a failure, while during the second one, approximately 300 Cossacks joined the Crimean invasion that ended successfully. The first major Cossack raid into Russia after the mentioned campaigns was in 1563. The prince Michał Wiśniowiecki devastated Novhorod-Siverskyi and Pochep. Eight years later, the Cossacks from Kaniv attacked Russia and raided Kolomak. In 1585, the Cossacks defeated a Russian unit on the river Bagatyi Zaton. In 1589, one of the largest anti-Russian campaigns took place. The Polish-Lithuanian troops attacked several settlements, particularly in the Russian borderlands, while the Cossacks captured a loot with a cost of about 5000 rubles, and killed and captured over 200 people, although their attempts to capture Rylsk and Oskol ended in failure.

Another successful raid was carried out by the Zaporozhian Cossacks into the Don Host, where they captured Vlas Yakovlev and Semen Novgorodets. In a parallel with this, some Cossacks led by ataman Matviy Fedorov joined the Russian service. His unit's first military operation was a battle with a Cossack raiders, which ended in a Russian victory and a capture of Senka Kovpak. On the next year, however, he returned to the Polish service.

In April 1590, the cherkassians from Kaniv, Pereyaslav, and Cherkasy came to Voronezh to supposedly assist the Russian state in fighting with the Tatars. The voivode Ivan Andreyevich, not suspecting anything, allowed them to enter the city. That night, they attacked the city, killed the local voivode, and burned the city to the ground, with most of local civilians being killed. The loot, captured by Cossacks, had a total cost of 40000 Rubles.

In 1592, the residents of Chernihiv had a conflict with the Cossacks, who had attacked the Russians near Pryluky and forced them to withdraw, capturing their horses.

In the summer of 1598, the Cossacks once again invaded Russia. This time, a Russian unit led by Konstantin (or Ivan) Myasnoy, which was sent to pursue the retreating Tatars, blocked the path for Cossacks and defeated them.

The start of Cossack campaigns in Russia appeared with the beginning of Dimitriads and a subsequent Polish–Russian war. According to Tatyana Tairova, over 12000 Zaporozhian Cossacks fought alongside the army of False Dmitry I: they participated in the capture of Moscow by False Dmitry's army in 1605.

In 1611, the Poles and the Zaporozhians captured Smolensk. At that time, a small detachment of Zaporozhians forced the voivodes in the Ryazan region to surrender. In the middle of 1611, some Muscovites organized a militia with the aim of recapturing Moscow. However, after an unsuccessful attempt to storm the city, they stopped near Moscow.

In 1612, the Polish-Lithuanian-Cossack army led by prince Semen Lyko captured and completely destroyed Belgorod.

In 1617, the Zaporozhian and Don Cossacks captured Oskol and tried to capture Voronezh but were defeated. Eventually, they were pushed back by prince Ivan Khovanskiy, who decisively defeated them near Oskol.

During Sahaidachny's campaign to Moscow, the Cossacks captured and plundered several Russian cities. After the main Cossack army of Petro Sahaidachy captured and sacked Livny and Yelets, a major (Note: About 10,000 people) unit led by Mykhailo Doroshenko attacked the Russian rear and captured several settlements, including Lebedyan, Dankov, Skopin, Ryazhsk, Pyesochnia, Sapozhok, and Shatsk. The joint actions of Doroshenko and Sahaidachny led to an occupation of Voronezh uyezd by the Cossacks as of August 1618. Later, Sahaidachny sent a 2,000-strong unit under the command of Fyodor Borispolets to raid the Russian territory. This unit captured Kasimov and Romanov (Tutayev). Following the siege of Moscow, which led to peace talks, parts of the Cossacks deserted from the main army and started looting Russian territories. On November 30, the Cossacks attacked Vologda but were forced to withdraw after an artillery attack by the Russians. On 4 December, the main Cossack forces attacked Kaluga, devastated it, and besieged the Russian garrison in a fortress. The siege was lifted on 1 January 1619 after the Cossacks received an order from Władysław IV to withdraw from Muscovy. By the 1620s, the damage from the campaign of Sahaidachny was almost completely repaired.

In 1631, the Cossack raiders had defeated the Russian unit of ataman Grigory Kaidalov.

One of the most devastating series of Cossack raids happened during the Smolensk War. In April 1633, the Cossacks invaded the main territory of Russia, attacked Valuyki, and sacked it. Then they approached Belgorod and besieged it, but due to the stubborn resistance from the Russian garrison, were forced to withdraw. The siege of Putyvl by Jeremi Wiśniowiecki and registered Cossacks, as well as the raid on Rylsk and a Cossack-Lithuanian attempt to capture Kaluga, ended in a failure. In October, after the siege of Smolensk was lifted, Polish king Władysław IV sent a 3,000-strong Cossack-Polish unit to raid Dorogobuzh. The raid was successful.

In 1634, the Cossacks led by Tymofiy Orendarenko and Taras Fedorovych defeated the Russians at the battle of Shchelkanovo. Same year, Cossack ataman Hyria Kanevets was killed near Novhorod-Siverskyi. Cossack and Tatar raids into southern Russia caused a mass desertion inside the Mikhail Shein's army under Smolensk, which led to the surrender of Shein in February 1634 and the eventual defeat of Russia in the entire war. Following the end of the Smolensk War, Zaporozhians withdrew from the Russian territories they controlled.

The Cossacks also often participated in Tatar and Nogai raids into Russia. In 1643, the Cossack-Nogai army attacked the villages of Larok and Krivets just west of Kozlov. The invaders killed and captured 281 Russian civilians.

In 1646, Russian units defeated a Cossack detachment. The "Thievish Cherkassians" lost two killed and one captured.

Despite the main conflict being against the Cossack raiders and, later, illegal settlers, the "serving Cherkassians" were also not always loyal to the Tsardom. Their revolts mainly took place in the mid-1600s. In 1641, the Cossacks of Chuhuiv, Kursk, and Kostenkov organised an armed uprising against the Tsardom. The Chuhuiv Cossacks killed Yakov Ostryanin and withdrew to Poland, while the other two revolts were suppressed. The border conflicts between Russia and the Zaporozhian Cossacks (Note: Including their states, particularly the Cossack Hetmanate) also took place during Vyhovsky's rebellion and the Left-Bank Uprising, notably the battle of Sevsk, but these were not frequent invasions but rather small-scale border raids with a goal of diverting Russian troops from the front line in Hetmanate.

=== Russian reaction ===
The Russian government was enraged with the Cossack actions. The Cossack attacks were included in the list of "hurts", which was delivered to Warsaw by Afanasiy Ryazanov in 1596. For the Russian voivodes, the Cossack attacks became one of the crucial problems in colonisation of the Wild Fields. To protect its territory from the continuous attacks by Cherkassians, the Russian Tsardom sped up the creation of major cities on the Russian border, as was explained to Ğazı II Giray. The Russian state in general treated the Cossack attacks similar to the Tatar ones, in spite of the Cossacks being considered almost as dangerous as Tatars, while in some cases it was even harder to fight the Cossacks than the Tatars. The Russian government also tried to expel the Cossack raiders from Russia several times, as well as launching a counter-raids into the Polish Ukraine. In 1585, after the battle of Bagatyi Zaton, the Russian government organised an expedition against the invaders led by Foma Buturlin and Yuri Bulgakov in order to expel the Zaporozhians from Don Host. The demand of expelling the Ukrainian Cossacks was once again sent in 1600 by tsar Boris Godunov. The Russian army expelled illegal Cossack settlers from Putyvl' uyezd several times, particularly in 1627 and 1631. During the Smolensk War, several Russian raids into the Ruthenian-populated lands were carried. The Myrhorod campaign of tsarist troops resulted in a Russian victory, while the raid on Poltava failed. Fear of the Cossack attacks was reportedly one of the reasons why Tsar Alexis did not provide an immediate help to Bohdan Khmelnytsky in his revolt against the Commonwealth and why the Russian state continued to treat the Zaporozhians with suspicion even after the Pereiaslav Agreement was signed in 1654.

== See also ==
- Cossack uprisings
- Wild Fields
- Cossack raids
- Tsardom of Russia

== Bibliography ==
- Papkov, A. I. (2004). Порубежье Российского царства и украинских земель Речи Посполитой (конец XVI — первая половина XVII века) 352 с. (PDF). Belgorod: Изд-во «КОНСТАНТА». ISBN 5-902711-02-9.
- Papkov, A. I. (2015). Расселение украинцев на южной окраине России в конце XVI - первой половине XVII в. Belgorod.
- Brekunenko, Viktor (2007). Війни українських козаків з Росією до часів Богдана Хмельницького (PDF). Kyiv. ISBN 978-966-02-4439-9.
- Sas, Petro (2007). Воєнний промисел запорозьких козаків (перша половина XVII ст.).
- Zagorovsky, Vladimir Pavlovich (1991). История вхождения Центрального Черноземья в состав Российского государства в XVI веке (in Russian). Изд-во Воронежского университета. ISBN 978-5-7455-0228-6.
- Skobelkin, O. V. (2013). Воронежская трагедия 1590 года // Из истории Воронежского края (PDF).
- Mandziak, Viktor (2011). Битви української середньовічної та ранньомодерної історії. Довідник (PDF). Літопис. p. 265. ISBN 9789668853081.
- Tairova-Yakovleva, Tatyana (2021). «ВОРОВСКИЕ ЧЕРКАСЫ»: СМЕРТНЫЙ ПРИГОВОР ИВАНУ БОГУНУ.
- Davies, Brian (2010). Warfare, State and Society on the Black Sea Steppe, 1500-1700 (Warfare and History) (PDF).
