= Battle of the Donskoy monastery =

1618 battle south of Moscow

- Part of Prince Władysław's March on Moscow
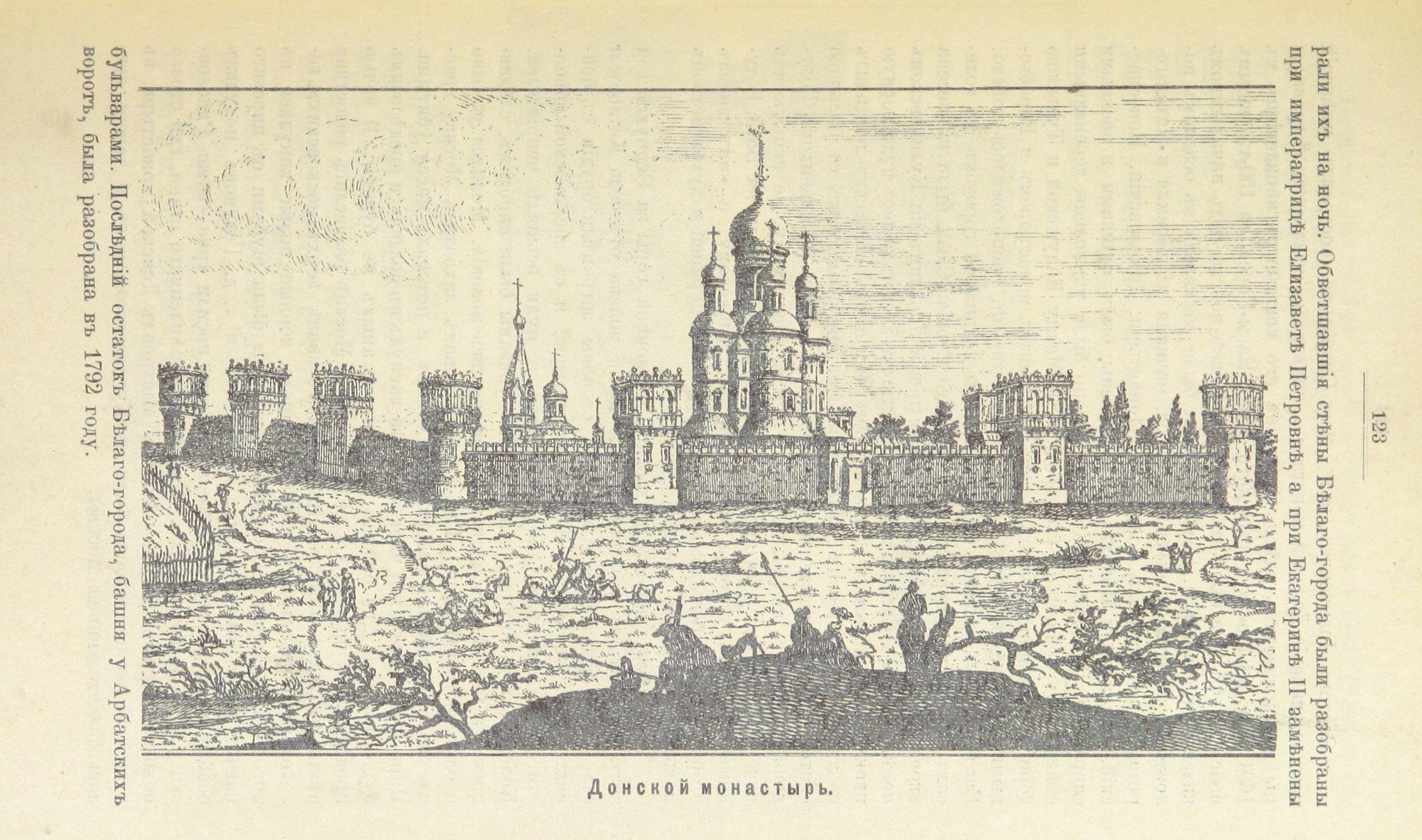
- Donskoy Monastery in the 17th century
| Date | 6 October 1618 |
| Location | Near Donskoy Monastery, southern outskirts of Moscow |
| Result | Cossack victory |

Belligerents
| Zaporozhian Cossacks | Tsardom of Russia |

Commanders and leaders
| Petro Sahaidachny | Vasily Buturlin † |

Strength
| 20,000 | 6,000 |

Casualties and losses
| Light | 2,000 killed or captured |

The Battle of the Donskoy monastery took place in south outskirts of Moscow as part of Prince Władysław's March on Moscow, between the Zaporozhian Cossacks of Petro Sahaidachny and Russian cavalry of Muscovite commander Vasily Buturlin. It took place on 6 October 1618, resulting in Cossack victory that cleared the way for advance on Moscow.

== Prelude ==
In June 1618, Cossack Hetman Petro Sahaidachny set off on a campaign with 20,000 Zaporozhian Cossacks as part of Prince Władysław's March on Moscow, during the Polish–Russian War. Hetman Sahaidachny expected to increase the privileges of Cossacks and freedoms for Eastern Orthodox Church by assisting the prince in this war.

On 16 June, the Cossacks assaulted Yelets and captured the fortress. From late July to early August, Mykhailo Doroshenko led 10,000 Cossacks in raids on Ryazan region. On 9 September, a reconnaissance force of 400 Cossacks crossed the Oka river. On 12 September, Prince Władysław IV Vasa ordered Hetman Sahaidachny to join the Polish–Lithuanian forces at Simonov Monastery on a march towards Moscow.

== Battle ==
On 6 October 1618, the Zaporozhian Cossack army of Cossack Hetman Petro Sahaidachny was blocked by the 6,000-strong cavalry of Russian commander Vasily Buturlin. The Muscovite cavalry consisted of the last reserves of Moscow trying to stop Cossacks reaching the capital.

The battle begun with a duel between Hetman Sahaidachny and Moscow governor Buturlin. Sahaidachny managed to knock off Buturlin from his horse. Zaporozhians then assaulted the Muscovite forces and destroyed its front units, forcing the rest of the cavalry to retreat.

== Aftermath ==
As a result of Cossack victory in this engagement, Cossack path towards Moscow was cleared. Moscow governor Vasily Buturlin fell in battle, with Muscovite forces suffering 2,000 killed or captured, while Cossacks avoided significant losses.

On 8 October 1618, Cossack Hetman Petro Sahaidachny joined his forces near Klushino with the Polish–Lithuanian army for upcoming Siege of Moscow.
