= Cossack raid on Sinop =

- Part of the Cossack raids and Cossack naval campaigns
Date	August 1614
Location	Sinop, North Anatolia, Ottoman Empire
Result	Cossack victory
Territorial changes	Destruction of Sinop by the Cossacks

Belligerents
Zaporozhian Cossacks	Ottoman Empire

Commanders and leaders
Petro Konashevych-Sahaidachny	(Ottoman Empire) Ahmed I (Ottoman Empire) Nasuh Pasha (Ottoman Empire) Ibrahim Pasha (Ottoman Empire) Ali Pasha (Ottoman Empire) Ahmet Pasha

Strength
2,000; 40 chaikas	60 boats (Blocking at Ochakov)

Casualties and losses
200 killed 20 captured 18 boats sunk	Entire garrison
- Thousands of Ottoman civilians killed (Per 17th century chronicles)

The Cossack raid on Sinop (Note: Turkish: Sinop'a Kazak Baskını Ukrainian: Козацький напад на Сіноп) was a Cossack attack led by Cossack leader Petro Konashevych-Sahaidachny with the goal of plundering a major Ottoman city on the shore of north Anatolia, which occurred on August 1614.

== Prelude ==
In 1613, Zaporozhian Cossacks carried out raids on Crimea. The same year, Cossacks carried out two raids on Ochakov where they beat an Ottoman garrison. The Commonwealth authorities were dissatisfied with aggressive actions of the Cossacks, believing they were provoking the Ottomans. However, Cossacks refused to cease raids. In 1614, Cossacks carried out a campaign into Wallachia. The same year, in August, Cossacks were now bold enough to carry out a much more significant action against the Ottoman Empire, which targeted its mainland in Anatolia. The target became the major Ottoman city of Sinop. Cossack force intended for the raid consisted of 2,000 Cossacks on 40 chaikas

== Raid ==
The Cossack raid begun with their landing near Trebizond, from where they intended to destroy Sinop garrison and burn their aresnal. The Cossacks came on the boats and attacked Sinop from the shore. The ancient castle of Sinop was captured by Cossacks, with the Ottoman garrison fully defeated. Cossacks proceeded to destroy the houses and plunder the city. Cossacks burnt Ottoman galleys and destroyed their arsenal. Before the reinforcements could arrive, Cossacks already took the loot to their chaikas and were leaving.

As soon as Sultan Ahmed I heard the news about the raid, he was furious and wanted to execute Great Vizier. However, Vizier's convinced him not to do this, with Vizier only receiving beating from Sultan. Vizier in his defense stated that he sent Ottoman fleet to pursue Cossacks. Ahmet Pasha ordered fleet from Akerman to reinforce other units at Ochakov, with Ali Pasha doing the same. Main force was in Ochakov with 60 boats commanded by Ibrahim Pasha, intending to block Cossack path.

Cossacks split into fleet into two parts, one being sent to land to the east of the Dnieper mouth and portage the boats higher up the river. On the way, one part Cossack fleet were attacked by Tatars, suffering losses which included 20 captured. Another Cossack fleet managed to evade Ottoman fleet, but had to throw off a lot of their loot. However, Cossacks still managed to carry out their escape plan and return to the Sich with considerable amount of loot. Other Cossack losses during the raid included 200 killed and 18 boats sunk.

== Aftermath ==
According to Ottoman chroniclers, Sinop was known as "the city of lovers" before it was turned into "melancholy desert" as a result of Cossack raid. The cost of damage was estimated at 40 million gold pieces. Many Christian prisoners were freed. The 1614 Cossack raid on Sinop was significant, as it became known in Ottoman chronicles as the first recorded Cossack raid into Anatolia. In this raid, Zaporozhian Cossacks demonstrated their ability to attack Ottomans on shores, taking them by surprise. Both the Ottoman and European chronicles spoke of the devastation of Sinop caused by Cossacks, with thousands killed. A year later, Cossacks carried out a raid on Istanbul under the leadership of Petro Konashevych-Sahaidachny.

== Bibliography ==
- Doroshenko, Dmytro (1939). History of the Ukraine. A. Vansovich.
- Turanly, Ferhad (2023). "Naval Campaigns of the Ukrainian Cossack Flee to the Fortress of Sinop". İstanbul.
