= Battle of Livny =

1618 battle in Moscow

- Part of Prince Władysław's March on Moscow
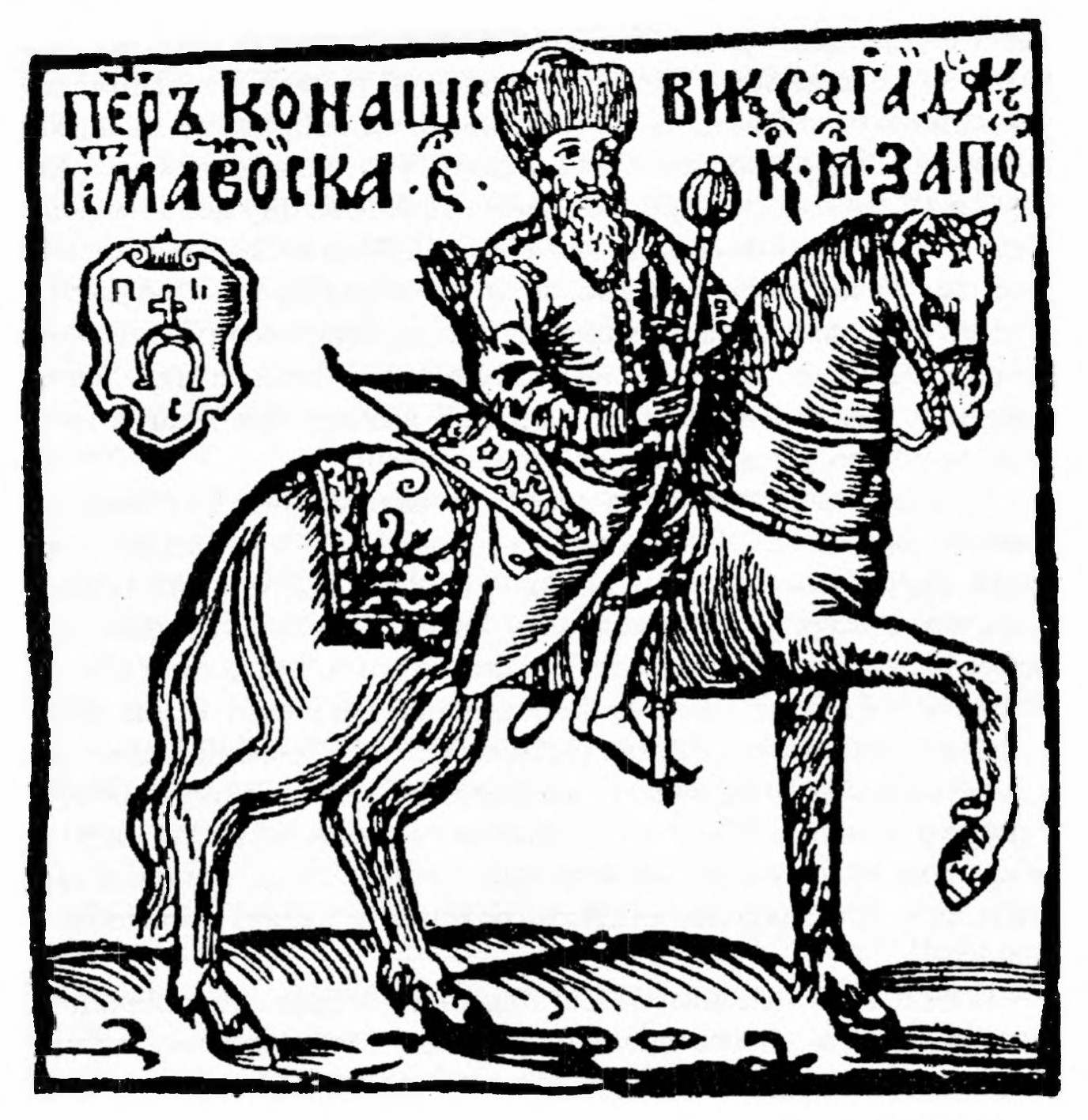
- Ukrainian Hetman Sahaidachny
Date	7 July 1618
Location	Livny
Result	Cossack victory

Belligerents
Zaporozhian Cossacks	Tsardom of Russia

Commanders and leaders
Petro Sahaidachny	Nikita Cherkassky (POW); Pyotr Danilov †

Strength
20,000	Unknown

Casualties and losses
Light	Entire garrison killed
- Nearly all Russian civilians killed or captured

Battle of Livny (7 July 1618) was the capture of the Russian fortress by the Cossacks of Hetman Petro Konashevych-Sahaidachny at the beginning of the campaign against Moscow. The Cossacks destroyed a powerful garrison.

== Prelude ==
Hetman Petro Sahaidachny likely set out from Zaporozhian Sich in June 1618, leading about 20,000 Zaporozhians. Earlier, some Cossack regiments, under the guise of preparing for an expedition, entered the Kiev Voivodeship and severely plundered its inhabitants. Only the threat of using the crown's troops against them made the unruly Cossacks stop the rapes.

== Battle ==
The first Russian city that the Zaporozhians attacked was Livny. Cossacks of Petro Sahaidachny suddenly attacked the city on July 7, Saturday. His defenders tried to resist. Local voivodes Nikita Cherkassky and Pyotr Danilov even led their warriors on a sortie that proved fatal for them: P. Danilov was killed, and N. Cherkassky was captured. By one o'clock in the afternoon, Livny fell. After capturing Livny, the Zaporozhians killed or captured nearly all local residents and then settled in the fortress and in the surrounding settlements. (Note: The Belsky Chronicle writes: "And he, pan Saadachny, came with Zaporozhian Cossacks to the Ukrainian city of Livny, and took Livny by an assault, and shed much Orthodox Christian blood, and slaughtered many innocent Orthodox peasants with their wives and children, and committed desecration against many Orthodox Christians, and desecrated and destroyed the Orthodox churches, and robbed all the Christian houses, and took many women and children captive.") On July 10, the Cossacks left Livny, preparing to march on other Russian cities.
