= Petro Konashevych-Sahaidachny =

Ukrainian Cossack political, civic, and military leader

- Петро Конашевич-Сагайдачний
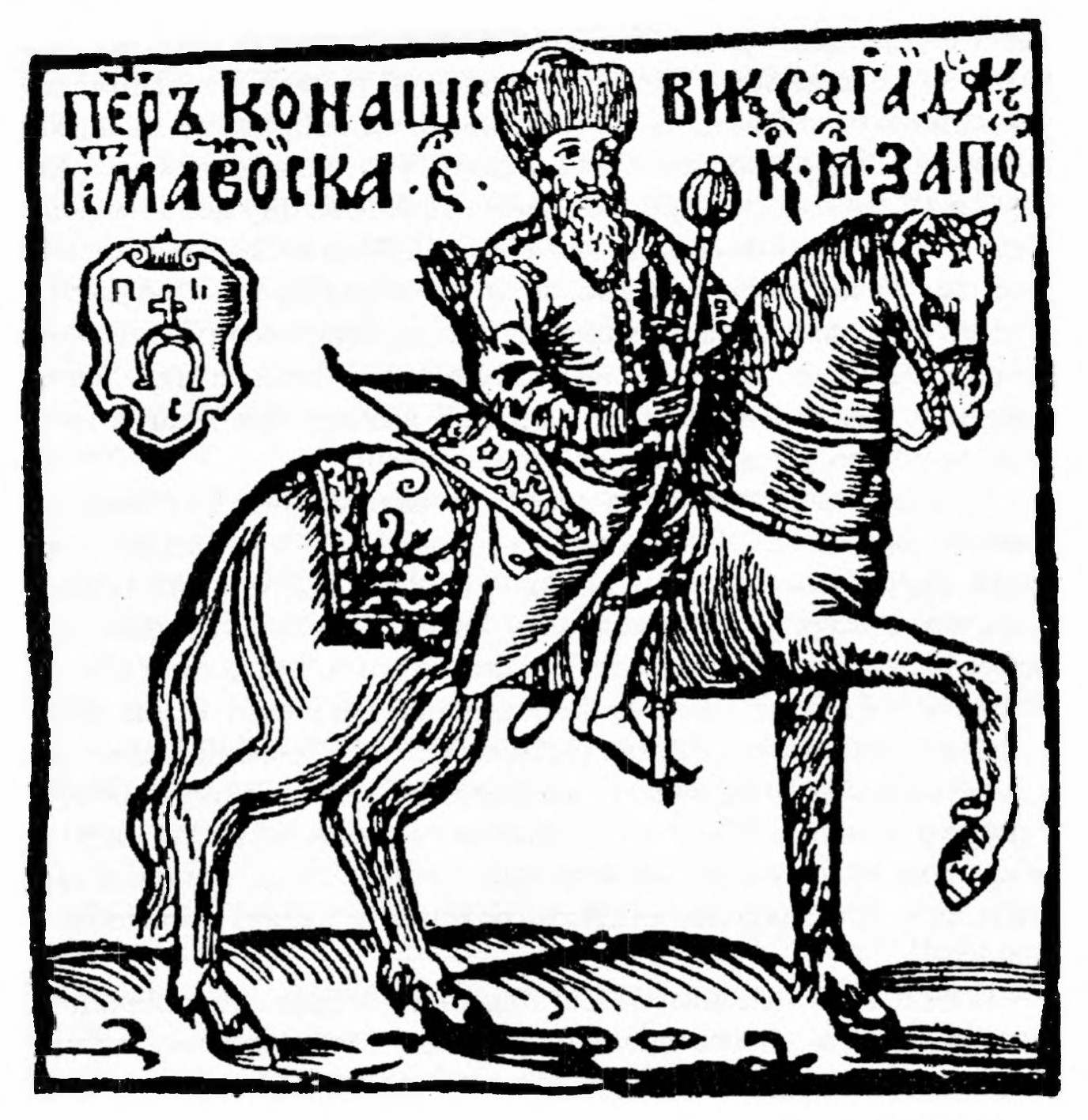
- Sahaidachnyi's equestrian portrait on a wood engraving dedicated to his burial in 1622

Hetman of the HRG Zaporozhian Host
- In office 1616–1622
- Preceded by: Vasyl Strilkovsky
- Succeeded by: Olifer Holub

Personal details
- Born: c. 1582 Kulchytsi, Polish–Lithuanian Commonwealth (now Ukraine)
- Died: 20 April 1622 Kyiv, Polish–Lithuanian Commonwealth (now Ukraine)
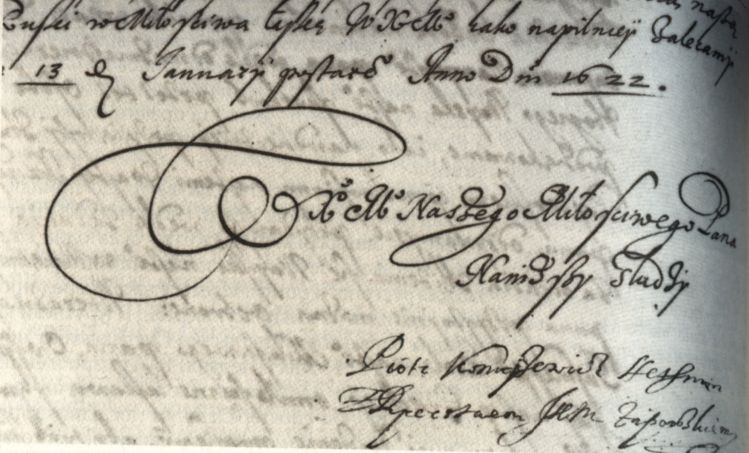
- Signature

Military service
- Battles/wars: See list: Moldavian Magnate Wars; Polish-Swedish War (1600-1611); Cossack raids; Cossack raid on Kiliia; Battle of Varna (1606); Cossack raid on Sinop; Cossack raid on Istanbul (1615); Battle of Kaffa (1616); Cossack raid on North Anatolia (1616); Polish–Russian War (1609–1618); Prince Władysław's March on Moscow; Battle of Livny; Battle of Yelets; Battle of the Donskoy monastery; Siege of Moscow (1618); Polish–Ottoman War (1620–1621); Battle of Khotyn (1621)

Petro Konashevych-Sahaidachny (Ruthenian: Петръ Конашевич Сагайдачный; Ukrainian: Петро Конашевич-Сагайдачний; Polish: Piotr Konaszewicz-Sahajdaczny; born c. 1582 – 20 April 1622) was a political and civic leader and member of the Ruthenian nobility, who served as Hetman of Zaporozhian Cossacks from 1616 to 1622. During his tenure, he transformed Zaporozhian Cossacks from irregular military troops into a regular army and improved relations between the Cossacks, the Orthodox clergy and peasants of Ukraine, which would later contribute to the establishment of a modern Ukrainian national consciousness. A military leader of the Polish–Lithuanian Commonwealth both on land and sea, Sahaidachny is best known for the significant role his troops played in the Battle of Khotyn against the Ottoman Empire in 1621, as well as the Polish Prince Władysław IV Vasa's attempt to usurp the Russian throne in 1618. The Zaporozhian Cossacks under his leadership were more efficient at fighting the Ottoman Empire than such major European powers as the Republic of Venice and Habsburgs. Sahaidachny reportedly took part in 60 battles without losing a single one.

In 2011 Sahaidachny was canonized by the Orthodox Church of Ukraine as a Right-Believing hetman. On 20 April 2022 he was further declared by Epiphanius of Kyiv to be patron saint of the military forces of Ukraine.

== Early life ==
The Coat of arms of Pobuh family, to which Petro Sahaidachny belonged.

Petro Konashevych was born into an Eastern Orthodox family of the Western Ukrainian nobility, at the village of Kulchytsy (Przemyśl land), in the Polish–Lithuanian Commonwealth. The village was in the Ruthenian Voivodeship, three miles (4.8 km) from Sambir. Based on the preserved memorial record of the Sahaidachny family, historians believe that Sahaidachny's father was called Konon (or Konash), after whose death Petro's mother took monastic vows ("nun Mokryna"). Elisey, who is mentioned with the surname Kaznovsky, is probably Sahaidachny's maternal grandfather.

Due to the lack of direct written sources, it is not known exactly when Petro Konashevych was born. Olena Apanovych indicates the years 1577–1578, and Petro Sas has the date around 1582. Based on the assumption that in those days, children were usually named after a saint whose date of birth was close, Sahaidachny was roughly born around June 29 (July 9) 1582, on the feast of the apostles Peter and Paul. In 2010, the 440th anniversary of the birth of Hetman Petro Sahaidachny was celebrated at the state level.

Modern historians believe that during the years 1589–1592, he received his primary education in Sambir. From 1592 to 1598, he studied at the Ostroh Academy in Volhynia, which at that time was experiencing a period of prosperity and where well-trained teachers worked. During the years 1594–1600, the rector, as well as the teacher of the Greek language, was Cyril Lucaris, then the Patriarch of Alexandria and of Constantinople.

The city of Ostroh was a major center of Eastern Orthodox culture, theology and ideology, in which many works directed against Catholicism and the Ukrainian Greek Catholic Church, formed by the Union of Brest, were produced. The intellectual and ideological atmosphere of Ostroh formed Sahaidachny's beliefs and political views as a zealous defender of Orthodoxy, who consistently defended the rights and interests of his Church throughout his life. During his studies, Sahaidachny wrote Explanation about the Union, in which he defended the Orthodox faith. This work was highly appreciated by contemporaries, in particular the Lithuanian chancellor Lew Sapieha, who called the work "the most valuable" in his letter to Josaphat Kuntsevych.

According to Volodymyr Antonovych, after graduation, Sahaidachny moved to Lviv, and later to Kyiv, where he worked as a home teacher, as well as an assistant to Kyiv land court judge Yan Aksak. Petro Sas suggests that during his studies at the Ostroh School, Sahaidachny decided to join the Zaporozhian Cossacks.

== With the Zaporozhian Cossacks ==
=== Joining the Zaporozhian Army ===
At the end of the 1590s and until the beginning of the 1620s, the main activity of the Zaporozhian Cossacks was aimed at obtaining means for their material existence. It came down primarily to service as military mercenaries, self-imposed stops, and contributions, as well as the seizure of military trophies, material values, prisoners, attacks on merchant ships, ambassadorial convoys, etc. War trophies, including cannons, jewels, as well as rich captives captured during looting expeditions, allowed the Cossacks to arm themselves well and act as a powerful military force. The Ottoman Empire and its vassals and, in certain periods, Muscovy, were the object of predatory attacks by the Zaporozhians. The Zaporozhians justified their activities primarily as protecting their native land from the enemy, which was carried out in the form of preemptive strikes on its territory and the liberation of Christian prisoners from captivity.

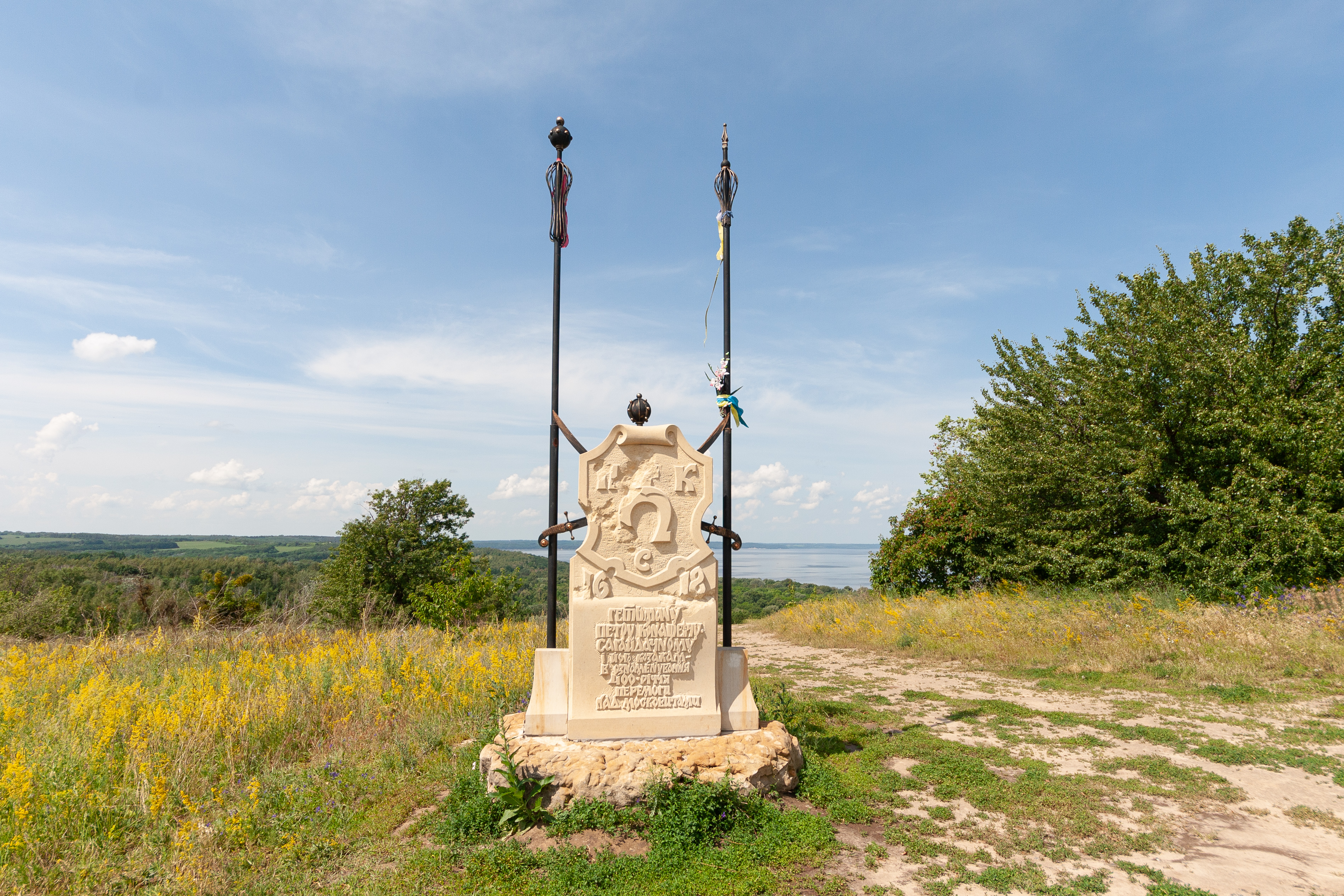
Monument to Sahaidachny in Trakhtemyriv, the historical residence of Registered Cossacks

At the end of the sixteenth century, apparently, in the second half of 1598, Konashevych joined the Zaporozhian Host. From Cassian Sakowicz's Poems, it is known that Konashevych spent a long time among the Zaporozhians, gaining authority with his courage and intelligence. It was in Zaporizhzhia that Konashevych began to be called "Sahaidachny" (from Ukrainian сагайдак - quiver) as a skilled archer. The surname "Sahaidachny" was quite common among Cossacks in the middle of the seventeenth century, especially in the Dnieper and Bratslav regions. Armed with a quiver, a well-trained archer could shoot from eight to twelve arrows per minute, which sometimes flew 500 paces.

=== Wallachia and Livonia campaigns ===
In the autumn of 1600, the Great Crown Hetman Jan Zamoyski organized a Moldavian–Wallachian military campaign, which was joined by several thousand Cossacks led by Gavril Krutnevych. The purpose of this campaign was to support Yeremia Mohyla (Petro Mohyla's uncle) and to restore the influence of the Polish–Lithuanian Commonwealth in Moldavia since it had been taken over by the Wallachian lord Michael the Brave in May. Sahaidachny participated in this campaign as a Cossack. On October 28, 1600, in the Battle of Bucov near the village of Bucov in Wallachia, the Polish troops defeated Michael the Brave.

At the beginning of 1601, the king of Poland, Sigismund III Vasa, announced the accession to the Polish–Lithuanian Commonwealth of Estonia, which previously belonged to Sweden. The Zaporozhian Cossacks responded to the king's call, and during 1601–1602 they took part in the military operations of the Polish-Swedish War. Among the other Cossacks, there was Sahaidachny, which was first under the leadership of Samuil Kishka, and from the beginning of 1602, Gavril Krutnevich.

The registered Cossack army was independent, separate in its structure and organization. The total number of combat personnel was 2,032 soldiers; 100–200 self-employed peasants were with the caravan. The army consisted of four regiments of 500 people each, artillery, and a convoy. The head of the campaign, Jan Zamoyski, entrusted the Zaporozhians with the functions of reconnaissance and ensuring a safe zone around the main royal army. Despite the military successes, the campaign turned out to be very expensive for the treasury of the Polish–Lithuanian Commonwealth. There was a lack of money to pay the soldiers, there was not enough warm clothing, food, ammunition, and fodder for the horses. The war dragged on, and the Cossacks saw it as absolutely hopeless. In the first days of September 1602, the Zaporozhians marched to Ukraine, overloaded with booty, and wounded and sick soldiers. Upon returning home, sensing their power and the helplessness of the crown government, the Cossacks resorted to looting, taking revenge on the nobility and burghers of Polotsk and Vitebsk, who helped the punitive troops suppress Severyn Nalivaiko's rebellion. In 1603, the Cossack army returned to Ukraine.

=== Zaporozhian sea campaigns ===
The period from 1603 to 1614, due to the lack of preserved verified written sources, is considered a "dark" period in Sahaidachny's biography. At that time he took an active part in the Cossack sea and land campaigns against the Ottomans and the Tatars of the Crimean Khanate. Only under such conditions could he be entrusted with the hetman's mace during the campaign to Kafa in 1616. At the beginning of the seventeenth century, Cossack war booty became an important geopolitical factor in the Black Sea basin. First, it caused constant tension in Polish-Ottoman relations. Secondly, the attacks of the Zaporozhians caused colossal economic losses to the Ottoman Empire, reduced its military power, and also had a deterrent effect on the Tatars, as they limited their opportunities to devastate Ukrainian lands. The Zaporozhians carried out their sea campaigns under the political slogan of fighting the enemies of the Holy Cross, and their main target was rich Ottoman and Tatar cities. They attacked several fortresses at the same time, but the main thrust was directed at the main objective of the campaign while trying to destroy the Ottoman fleet in ports and at sea.

One of such campaign attributed to Sahaidachny was the sea campaign to Varna in the summer of 1606. During this campaign, the Cossacks captured a fortress that had been considered impregnable before. The storming of Varna ended with the destruction of all coastal fortifications and Ottoman ships that were on the raid. The result of the battle was the liberation of several thousand prisoners, the Zaporizhia captured significant trophies and 10 Ottoman galleys with cargo and crew. Because of this campaign, the Sultan issued an order to block the Dnieper near the island of Tavani with an iron chain and block the Cossacks, but these measures were ineffective.

In 1607, the Zaporozhians conducted a major campaign against the Crimean Khanate, during which they captured and burned Perekop and Ochakiv. In 1608 and the beginning of 1609, Sahaidachny carried out a sea campaign on 16 "seagull" boats to the mouth of the Danube, during which an attack was made on Kiliya, Bilhorod, and Izmail. In 1612, a Cossack flotilla consisting of 60 seagulls carried out successful campaigns against enemy fortifications at Gozliv, Babadag, Varna, and Mesembria.

In 1613, the Cossacks made two campaigns on the Ottoman coast, and at the mouth of the Dnieper, they defeated the Ottoman flotilla and captured six Ottoman galleys.

In August 1614, the Zaporozhians on forty seagulls went to the shores of the Ottoman Empire: They captured Trebizond, besieged Sinop, captured the castle, knocked out the garrison, and destroyed the entire fleet of galleys and galleons that were on the raid.

In 1615, 80 Cossack seagulls approached Constantinople, where they burned to the ground the harbors of Mizevni and Archioka, along with the fleet stationed there. The Ottoman sultan sent a whole flotilla in pursuit of the Cossacks. However, the Ottoman flotilla was defeated in sea battles near Zmiiny Island and near Ochakiv, and the Cossacks captured the Ottoman admiral Ali Pasha.

== Zaporozhian Cossack leader ==
=== Receiving the Hetman mace ===
In February 1615, Konashevych was already an influential Cossack colonel commanding a detachment of up to 3,000 Cossacks. This is known from the letter of Łukasz Sapieha, who complained to his brother Lew about Sahaidachny, who was in the Kyiv region and did not want to come to the aid of units of the Polish–Lithuanian Commonwealth and ordered his Cossacks to retreat. As Łukasz Sapieha pointed out, Sahaidachny wanted to use the help of the Crimean Tatars to oust the soldiers from Ukraine, because the Cossacks felt hatred for them.

In the spring of 1616, the Zaporozhian hetman was Vasyl Strilkovskyi. Around the end of April - the beginning of May, the Zaporozhians marched on the Ottoman cities. During this successful campaign, the cities of Varna and Mysivri were taken. The Ottoman fleet, sent to catch up, was defeated at the mouth of the Danube. In June or at the beginning of July 1616, a change of hetman took place: Sahaidachny was proclaimed the hetman of the Zaporizhzhian Army. The reason for his election may have been the promise of organizing a bigger campaign than the one that took place in the spring.

=== Battle for Kaffa ===
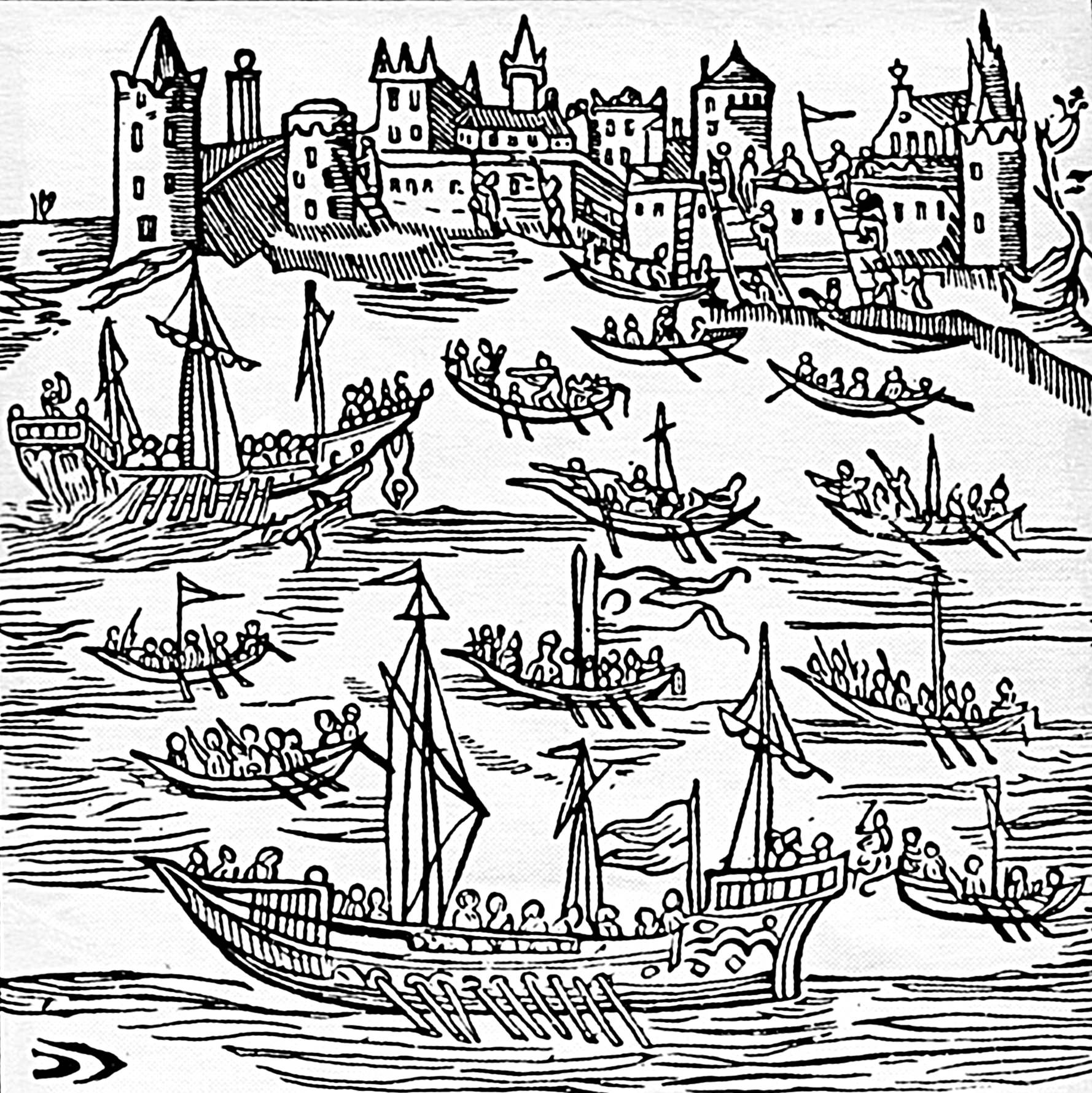
Cossacks capturing Caffa (Feodosia). Woodcut from 1622 book

Shortly after being elected hetman, Sahaidachny prepared a campaign to the impregnable Ottoman fortress of Kaffa (modern Feodosia), which was the main slave market in the Crimea. The Ottomans, who had not yet recovered from the recent Cossack attack on the cities of the Rumelia coast, did not expect such a quick attack on a well-fortified fortress. Kaffa was a large and rich city, whose population numbered between seventy thousand and one-hundred thousand. It had strong defensive fortifications: 13-meter (43 ft) outer walls more than 5 km (3.1 mi) long. The city garrison consisted of 3 janissary regiments. The commandant of the fortress had about 300 soldiers at his disposal, another 200 soldiers were under the command of the Capudana – the commander of the naval forces.

In July 1616, the hetman together with six thousand Cossacks on 120–150 seagulls went on a naval campaign. At the exit from the Dnieper (Dnipro) in the Dnieper–Bug estuary, the Cossacks met a squadron of Ottoman galleys, which defeated and captured about half of the ships. To mislead the Ottomans about his further actions, Sahaidachny ordered part of the army to demonstratively return to Zaporozhian Sich with the captured booty. With the rest of the army, he hid near Ochakiv for about a week. Having lulled the enemy's vigilance, the Cossacks continued their march.

The news of the capture of Kafa by the Zaporozhians caused a commotion in Bakhchisarai, Khan Janibek-Gerai fled to the fortress of Chufut-Kale. At the same time, the Khan sent the available troops to the Crimean coast to prevent the Cossacks from landing on land. However, the Cossacks defeated the army that stood in their way, replenished fresh water supplies, and burned several settlements. After that, the Zaporozhians returned to Sich without a fight.

The victorious campaign on Kaffa, which had a clear liberating character, gained considerable publicity not only in Ukraine. Later, Kasiyan Sakovich glorified this feat of Sahaidachny and his Cossacks in his "Poems". This description acquired a heroic meaning in the historical memory of Ukrainians.

After this victory, Sahaidachny attacked Istanbul. "Cossacks," says the Ottoman archival chronicle, "entered Istanbul, killed five- or six thousand Ottomans, captured a large number of prisoners, and burned half of the city." Already near Sich, in the strait of Kinsky Vody, the Cossack flotilla met the squadron of Admiral Ibrahim Pasha sent to catch up. During a short but fierce battle, the Cossacks defeated the Ottoman admiral. After returning, the Cossacks continued to attack the Ottoman fortresses. According to contemporaries, the Cossacks controlled the navigation between the Bosphorus and the Dnieper–Bug estuary. As the famous Italian traveler Pietro della Valle pointed out in May 1618: "The Turks do not have a single place on the Black Sea that the Cossacks did not take and plunder. In any case, today they are such a significant force on the Black Sea that, if they exert more energy, they will completely control it."

=== First deprivation of the hetmanship ===
In the summer of 1616, the Sejm of the Polish–Lithuanian Commonwealth decided to continue the war with Muscovy. For this, they were gathering a 10,000-strong army, with which Prince Władysław was to go to Moscow. At the Sejm, it was decided to allocate 20,000 zlotys to the Zaporozhian people to involve them in this campaign. Negotiations with the Cossacks were conducted by the Lithuanian chancellor Lew Sapieha. Sahaidachny supported this decision, and already in January 1617, parts of the Zaporozhians captured Oskol and tried to capture Voronezh. However, the Tsarist troops were able to dislodge the Zaporozhians from Moscow's territory.

At the end of 1616, the authorities of the Polish–Lithuanian Commonwealth decided to form a government commission for negotiations with the Zaporozhians, the purpose of which was to ban sea campaigns against the Ottoman Empire. The meeting of the commission was scheduled for March 1, 1617, in Kyiv.

An unsuccessful campaign in the Moscow region, as well as the rejection of the government commission by the Cossacks, led to the growth of dissatisfaction with Sahaidachny's policy. At the beginning of 1617, the Cossacks elected Dmytro Barabash as hetman. He disrupted the commission in Kyiv, and already in April organized a large sea campaign against the Ottomans with the participation of 150 seagulls.

The successful actions of the Zaporozhian Cossacks angered the Ottoman sultan. At the beginning of August 1617, the Ottoman fleet reached Zaporozhian Sich, but at that time there were only a few dozen Cossacks there. Meanwhile, punitive ground troops under the command of Iskander Pasha moved into the territory of the Polish–Lithuanian Commonwealth. On the banks of the Dniester, near the towns of Bushi and Yaruga, they met the royal army under the command of Stanisław Żółkiewski. Wanting to avoid a battle, on September 23, the parties concluded a peace treaty, one of the clauses of which was the prohibition of the Zaporozhians from leaving the Dnieper River in the Black Sea. Soon after, the Grand Crown Hetman wrote a letter to the Zaporozhians to send their representatives to Pavolocha, on the Rostavytsia River.

S. Zholkevskyi went to Pavolocha with the crown army. However, the Zaporozhians also sent there not only their representatives but also a strong army. The Grand Crown Hetman retreated, waiting for reinforcements. Negotiations began on October 28 in the Sukha Vilshanka tract. The commissars announced that the government agreed to pay 10,000 zlotys and 700 rolls of cloth to the Zaporizhzhya Army every year. Instead, the Poles demanded that the number of Zaporozhians be reduced and that the Zaporozhian hetman be appointed by the king. These negotiations caused a riot among the Cossacks, Barabash was reminded that because of his imprudence, the Ottoman troops attacked Zaporizhzhia Sich. At the end of October, the Zaporizhia ousted Barabash from the hetmanship and elected Sahaidachny as his hetman for the second time.

== Return: Formation of an anti-Turkish alliance ==
Between October 28 and 31, 1617, Konasevych returned again to negotiate with the government commissioners of the Polish-Lithuanian Commonwealth. He rejected the anti-Cossack project of the agreement of Stanisław Żółkiewski while introducing into the text of the Vilshan Agreement of 1617 points that were more favorable to the Cossacks. Even though Sahaidachny submitted to the will of the king and promised not to carry out naval attacks on Ottoman cities, the Sejm of the Polish–Lithuanian Commonwealth did not approve this agreement.

In 1617–1618, the Zaporozhians concluded an alliance agreement with the Georgian prince (Megrelia or Huria) on the protection of merchant vessels. In the spring of 1618, the Zaporizhians intensified their diplomatic efforts to fight together against the Ottoman Empire. At the beginning of March 1618, Sahaidachny sent an embassy to the Persian shah to enlist his support in the war against the Ottoman Empire. However, due to the betrayal of the Imereti prince, the embassy did not achieve its goal.

In April 1618 in Warsaw, the ambassadors of the Zaporizhzhian Army generally agreed to the anti-Ottoman plan of the Persian Shah Abbas I the Great to relocate 10,000–12,000 Cossacks to the Black Sea port of Jani (perhaps at the mouth of the Trabzon River).

On April 7, in the capital of the Polish–Lithuanian Commonwealth, the Zaporozhian ambassadors, led by Dmytro Otrokhymovich, signed an agreement with Oliver de Marcon (a representative of Duke Carl Gonzaga de Never, who later became one of the founders of a new knightly order called the League of Christian Militia). According to this agreement, Oliver de Marcon became the representative of the Zaporozhians in the matter of involving them in the crusade against the Ottoman Empire, which the Duke de Nevers was trying to organize. The Zaporozhian ambassadors promised to field a 60,000-strong army together with their allies (perhaps the Don Cossacks) for this war. The Pope of Rome (at that time Paul V), the German emperor, the kings of Spain, England, the Polish-Lithuanian Commonwealth, and France belonged to this league. Participation in these negotiations testified to the military and political weight of the Zaporizhzhian Army in European politics at that time.

== Campaign of 1618 to Moscow ==
=== Prelude to campaign ===
At the beginning of April 1617, Prince Władysław left Warsaw on a campaign to Moscow to obtain the crown of the Moscow Tsar, which at that time was owned by Mykhailo Romanov, elected by the Zemsky Sobor on February 21, 1613, the first Moscow Tsar from the Romanov dynasty. At the end of September near Smolensk, the prince's army united with the army of Jan Karol Khodkevich. In the spring, the crown army of the Polish–Lithuanian Commonwealth, led by Prince Władysław, approached the town of Vyazma and set up camp, awaiting the arrival of reinforcements. However, neither soldiers nor money arrived, so most of the soldiers left the camp. To save the prince and rectify the situation, the government of the Polish–Lithuanian Commonwealth turned to the Zaporizhzhian Army for help. In March 1618, twelve Zaporozhian centurions met with Prince Władysław and promised to bring him an army of 20,000.

Conditions for the participation of Sahaidachny's troops in the campaign:

1. Expansion of the Cossack territory in the Polish-Lithuanian Commonwealth;
2. Freedom of the Orthodox faith in Ukraine;
3. Increase of registered Cossack army;
4. Recognition of administrative and judicial autonomy of Ukraine by the Polish-Lithuanian Commonwealth.

The situation in which King Sigismund III found himself was difficult, so he promised to fulfill these conditions. Sahaidachny was sent gifts - a mace, a bunchuk, a seal, and a flag.

Preparations for the Moscow campaign were discussed at two general councils in June 1618. At these negotiations, the Cossacks, in particular, demanded an end to the oppression of the Orthodox population. After the negotiations, the Ukrainian command under the leadership of Hetman Sahaidachny developed a plan for the future campaign. Since according to Cossack intelligence reports, most of the Moscow troops were aimed at Smolensk, Sahaidachny rejected the plan of the Polish–Lithuanian Commonwealth, which provided for the movement of Cossacks from Smolensk to Vyazma, instead choosing the route from Putivl directly to Moscow. To preserve the secret, the hetman did not inform the Polish–Lithuanian Commonwealth of his plan. In addition, the Cossacks conducted an operation to divert the attention of Moscow governors from the southern border.

=== The way to Moscow ===
In the second half of June 1618, six regiments of the 20,000-strong Cossack army led by Konashevych left for Moscow. The Zaporozhians took seventeen small-caliber guns with them, and the rest of the artillery was left in Kyiv in order not to slow down the movement. After crossing the Dnieper (the Dnipro ), Sahaidachny's army set out on the Muravsky road, which led from the Crimea along the left bank of the Dnieper in the direction of Tula.

On July 7, the Cossacks approached Livny, one of the most fortified cities in the south of Moscow region. The result of an unexpected attack by the Zaporozhians was the capture of the city before one o'clock in the afternoon. Voivode Nikita Cherkassky was captured, and another voivode, Petro Danilov, died during the battle. Having captured the Livonian fortress, the Zaporozhians destroyed all the defenders. After capturing the city, the Zaporozhians were stationed in its post, and on July 10, they continued their journey.

On July 16, the Zaporozhians approached Yelets, a strong fortress located a few tens of kilometers to the northeast. The defense of the city was managed by the voivode Andriy Polev, who had up to 7,000 warriors at his disposal (about 2,000 of his own garrison and the army of the Mtsen voivode). Realizing that the siege of the city could last quite a long time, Sahaidachny used a trick. He hid most of his army in the forest, and with a small part approached the city. Seeing this, the governors of Yelets, Ivan Khrushchev and Andriy Polev, ordered their troops to go beyond the walls and began to pursue the Cossacks. Meanwhile, the main Cossack troops came out of cover and completely defeated the Muscovite army. During the following night, the Cossacks stormed the fortress with the remnants of the Moscow army and after three attacks broke through the walls and captured the fortress. Therefore, the priests of Yelets asked the Zaporozhians not to destroy the city, offering instead to hand over the tsar's envoy S. Khrushchev together with the treasury (30 thousand rubles intended to bribe the Crimean Khan). The Cossacks accepted the capitulation and sent a small detachment to carry out arrests and requisitions.

At the end of July and the beginning of August, Sahaidachny sent Colonel Mykhailo Doroshenko at the head of a 10,000-strong detachment to raid the Ryazan region. His troops captured the cities of Lebedyan, Skopyn, Dankov, and Ryazhsk. At the beginning of August, this detachment burned the positions of Pereyaslavl-Ryazanskyi. Upon returning to Sahaidachnoy's troops, Pesochnya, Sapozhok, and Shatsk were captured.

Having united his own forces and determined through the envoys the meeting place of the Ukrainian and Polish–Lithuanian Commonwealth troops in Tushin, the Ukrainian hetman continued his campaign. A detachment of 1,000 horsemen led by Colonel Mylosny was sent to the strong fortress of Mykhailovo. The Cossacks failed under Mikhailov. The Zaporozhians were supposed to capture the city on the night of August 21–22, but due to bad weather, they reached the city only on August 22. During this time, reinforcements came to the city, and the plan of a surprise attack failed. Sahaidachny with the main army arrived at the fortress on August 26 and was forced to switch to the usual siege. After two attempts to capture the city by storm on September 7, Konashevich was forced to abandon the siege to meet Prince Władysław near Moscow.

After the unsuccessful siege of Mykhailov, Sahaidachny sent about 2,000 Cossacks under the leadership of Fyodor Boryspilets to the close approaches of Moscow from the south — to the Meshchersky Krai. One of the tasks of this maneuver was to divert the attention of the enemy from the planned forcing of the Oka to the north of Mikhailov by the main Cossack army. The troops of Fedor Boryspilets captured the cities of Kasimov, Kazar, and Romanov.

Tsar Mykhailo Romanov sent a 7,000-strong army under the leadership of Dmytro Pozharsky and Prince Grigory Volkonsky against the Cossacks. This army had to prevent the Zaporozhians from crossing the Oka River and stop their advance towards Moscow. However, during the campaign, D. Pozharsky fell ill, and voivode H. Volkonsky took over the entire leadership of the tsarist army. He tried to prevent the hetman from crossing the Oka near Kolomna.

On September 9, Sahaidachny crossed the Oka with a reconnaissance detachment of Cossacks numbering about 400 people. The crossing was made in the area of modern Perevytskyi Torzhek, 30 km (19 mi) southeast of Kolomna. Having received this information, the hetman decided to go with the main forces to the well-fortified Zaraisk, and sent some colonels to capture Kashira. The first skirmishes near Zaraysk took place on September 11, when the Zaporizhians vanguard defeated a detachment of Moscovy soldiers, and the Cossacks even managed to break into the city prison. However, these forces were not enough to secure success, and Zaraisk stood firm. On September 12, Sahaidachny received a letter from Prince Władysław, in which he indicated that he was leaving Mozhaisk for Moscow, and ordered the hetman to proceed immediately to arrive in the area of the Simon Monastery. The next day, a Cossack council was convened, where they decided to begin the march to Moscow on September 14, without waiting for the return of Fedor Boryspolets. The Cossacks also decided to cancel the assault on Kashira and concentrate on preparing a crossing near Zaraisk. During September 15–16, the Zaporizhians were besieging Zaraysk, at the same time concentrating their troops near the confluence of the Osetra River with the Oka River and preparing for the crossing.

On September 15, Tsar Mikhail Romanov ordered H. Volkonsky not to allow Sahaidachny's army to cross the Oka River under any circumstances, and to reject them if they tried to cross. On September 16, the first 400 infantry Cossacks boarded boats for the crossing. Meanwhile, to prevent the crossing, H. Volkonskyi and his army went to the landing place. However, by the end of the day, about a thousand Zaporizhians had landed above and below the place where the army of the Moscow voivode was stationed. Having received information about this, Volkonsky began to hastily retreat to Kolomna. His army was struck by desertion, and detachments of Moscow Cossacks and Astrakhan Tatars fled from him. Taking this into account, Volkonsky decided to leave Kolomna with the army, after which he hurriedly left for the village. Gzhel is 65 km from Kolomna. During the next few days, without encountering resistance from the demoralized Moscow army, Sahaidachny crossed the Oka River with minimal losses.

Shortly after the crossing, the Cossack troops camped near Cherkizovo, from there on September 24 Sahaidachny wrote a letter to Prince Władysław in which he announced that he was sending his ambassadors, Colonels Mykhailo Doroshenko and Bohdan Konsha, with the task of precisely determining the time and place of their arrival near Moscow. On September 28, the ambassadors arrived in Zvenigorod and during negotiations with the command of the Commonwealth of Nations, they agreed that the unification of the troops would take place on October 3 in the village of Tushino. However, Sahaidachny had his own plans: to secure his rear, he organized a series of attacks on Moscow troops stationed near Kolomna, and on October 3, F. Pyrskyi's regiment attacked the city itself, and the Cossacks even broke into the territory of the posad.

On October 6, the army led by P. Sahaydachnyi set off along the Kashirskyi road towards Moscow. In the area of the Don monastery, the Moscow army led by Vasyl Buturlin blocked their way. The tsar sent 6,000 cavalrymen, all available Moscow reserves, against Sahaidachny. At the beginning of the battle, Sahaidachny and Moscow voivode Buturlin fought personally and the hetman knocked the voivode off his horse. During the battle, the Zaporozhians destroyed the forward units of the enemy, and the rest of the Moscow cavalry began to flee.

=== Siege of Moscow ===
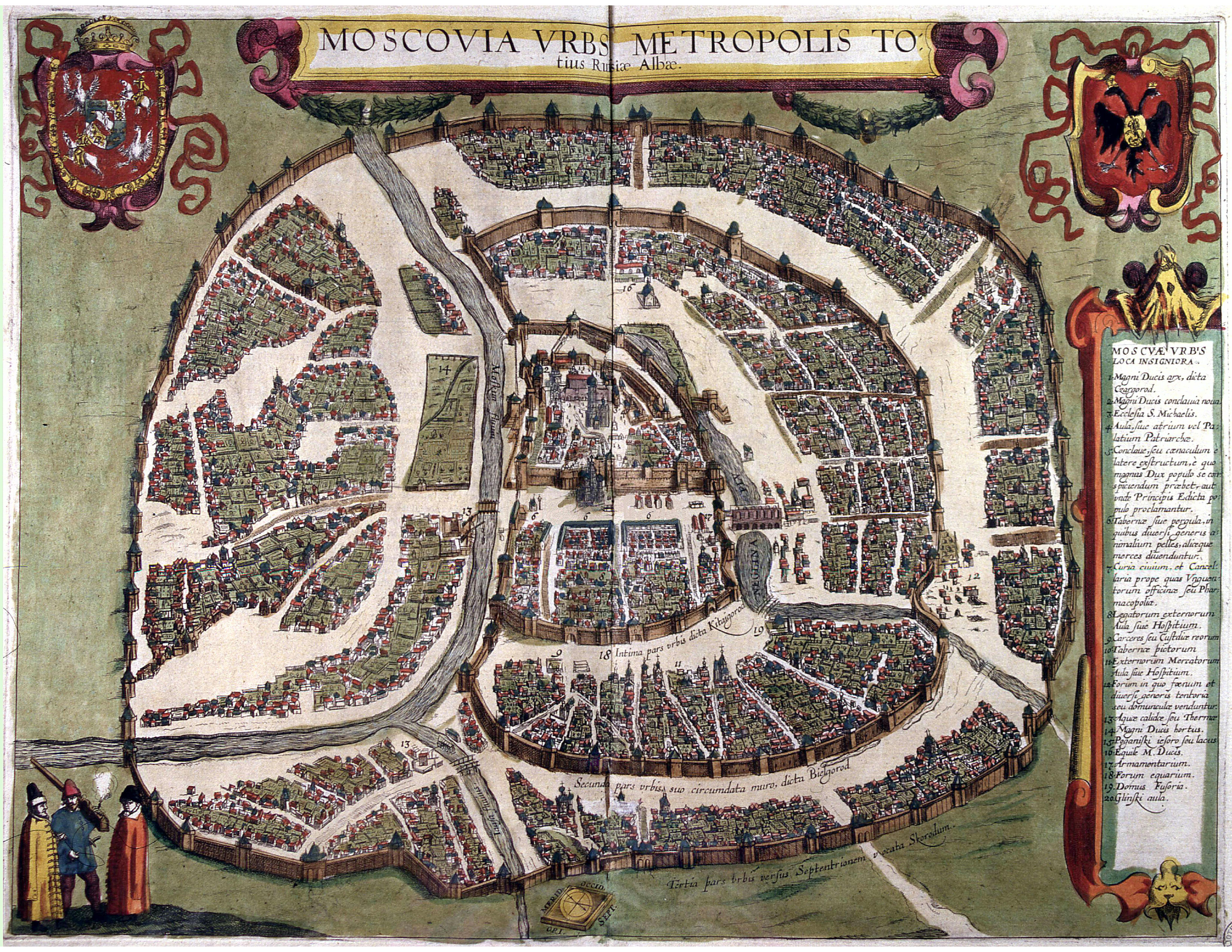
Polish plan of Moscow from 1610

Sahaidachny's intentions towards Moscow were very decisive, and this is confirmed by his letter to Prince Władysław, which was sent after September 24. In the letter, the hetman writes: "May God almighty in the achievement of this plan for the honor of the kingdom assigned to your royal grace, be happy and blessed, and that people stubbornly under the feet of their majesty will contribute to subverting".

On October 8, near Tushino, the Zaporozhians united with the forces of Prince Władysław. As a gift, the Cossacks handed over to the prince the governors of Livonia and Yelets, royal ambassadors, and captured Tatars. On the eve of Sahaidachny's arrival, the Lithuanian hetman Jan-Karol Khodkevich developed a plan to storm Moscow. This plan consisted in a simultaneous assault on the capital from several sides, with the main strikes near the Arbat and Tver gates. The main attacking force was the troops of the Polish–Lithuanian Commonwealth and mercenaries. The army of Zaporozhian Cossacks was divided into several parts, some of them went to storm the fortress beyond the Moscow River, and the rest had to play the role of a reserve and distract the tsarist troops from the main directions.

On October 11, the army of Prince Władysław and the Registered Cossacks of Peter Sahaidachny launched an offensive against Moscow. The assault lasted for several hours from three o'clock in the morning until dawn. The attackers were able to break into the city from the side of the Arbat Gate; however, not receiving adequate support, the attack stopped. Not seeing the possibility of continuing the attack, the units of the Polish-Lithuanian Commonwealth retreated from the city with small losses.

The difficult military circumstances forced the Moscow authorities to negotiations, which were held for the first time on October 31 near the Tver Gate. During November, long negotiations were held between the Polish and Moscow ambassadors. Each of the parties expected the faster exhaustion of their opponent. Meanwhile, separate detachments of the Zaporozhians continued to attack Moscovy cities north and northwest of Moscow, ravaging the Yaroslavl and Vologda districts, thereby undermining the state's economic resources.

At the end of October, Sahaidachny sent an 8,000-strong army to the south of Moscow, to the land adjacent to the left bank of the Oka. The main goal of this raid was to capture Kaluga, a well-fortified, strategically important city with a strong fortress. Serpukhov became the first notable settlement on the way of this raid. On November 3, Cossack regiments under the leadership of Colonels Yemets, F. Pyrsky, Mylosny, and B. Konsha began an assault on the city. Within a few hours, the Cossacks took the city posad (market settlement), but did not storm the kremlin (fortified central complex, stone city), which was located in a difficult-to-reach place, because there was little chance of its quick capture. These regiments then marched to connect with the regiment of Peter Sahaidachny near the city of Kaluga, and on the night of December 3–4, 1618, the combined army began an assault on the city. The Zaporizhia, as a result of a lightning attack, captured the city post, forcing the city garrison under the leadership of Voivode M. Gagarin to lock himself in the city citadel. The siege of the Kaluga Kremlin lasted until the signing of the Polish-Moscow armistice.

Konashevich-Sahaidachny's raid on Kaluga was a shock for the Moscow authorities. Evaluating these events, Jan III Sobieski pointed out that it was because of this raid that the Muscovites were terrified and that the Zaporozhians "inclined their commissioners to negotiate as soon as possible." Renewal of negotiations took place on December 3 in the village of Deulini near the Trinity-Sergius Lavra. Negotiations were held during three rounds of negotiations, the parties came to a common decision, and on December 11, 1618, they signed the so-called Deulin truce. It became the greatest success of the Polish-Lithuanian Commonwealth in the confrontation with the Moscow State. The Polish-Lithuanian Commonwealth received Belorussian and Ukrainian lands that had previously been seized by Moscow – Smolensk, Chernihiv, and Novgorod-Siversk, a total of 29 cities. The King of the Polish–Lithuanian Commonwealth officially retained the right to claim the Moscow throne. On the other hand, this armistice marked the end of the period of constant wars in the Muscovite kingdom, which lasted for 15 years. According to Viktor Brehunenko, Sahaidachny himself was against appeasement and openly advocated the capture of Moscow.

== Post-siege: Aftermath ==
=== Return to Ukraine ===
At the end of December, the Cossack Council decided to end hostilities and return to Ukraine. The army was divided into two parts, which marched along a parallel path. Most of them, under the leadership of Sahaidachny, moved along the left bank of the Oka River in the direction of Przemysl, Belyov, Bolkhov, and then on to Kyiv. A smaller part, under the command of F. Pyrskyi, went along the right bank of the Oka River in the direction: Ovdoyev, Kursk, and then on to Kyiv. In a few weeks, Sahaidachny's army was already in Ukraine, at the same time it was supported by the Moscow authorities, providing supplies and provisions.

After returning to Ukraine, Sahaidachny's army was stationed in the Kyiv Voivodeship, and the Hetman's regiment was stationed in Kyiv itself. For their participation in the Moscow campaign, the Zaporozhians received a monetary reward in the amount of 20,000 gold pieces and 7,000 pieces of cloth. According to D. I. Yavornytskyi, upon his arrival in Kyiv, Petro Sahaidachny assumed the title of "hetman of Ukraine" and began to rule that part of it that recognized itself as Cossack.

=== Signing of the Rostavy Agreement ===
Sahaidachny's refusal to go on sea campaigns against the Ottomans caused discontent among broad sections of the Cossacks. Around the end of May 1619, Sahaidachny was deprived of power and Dmytro Barabash was elected Zaporozhian hetman. However, already at the beginning of July, Konashevych-Sahaidachny regained the hetman's mace. Around July 30, he convened a council in Kyiv, which was attended by about a thousand Cossacks and elders delegated from the places. Acting in the interests of the so-called ancient Cossacks (whose social base consisted of about 10,000 people from among Zaporozhian veterans, Cossack descendants, and elders), the members of the council spoke in favor of a political compromise with the authorities of the Polish–Lithuanian Commonwealth: in exchange for recognizing the constitutional rights of the "ancient" Cossacks, they voluntarily agreed to purge the Zaporizhzhian Army of the "new" Cossacks – the Cossack peasants and townspeople. At this council, it was also decided to take the Orthodox Church under the protection and defense of the Zaporozhian Army.

However, official Warsaw wanted to reform the Zaporozhian Army on the model of the Polish–Lithuanian Commonwealth. King Sigismund III sent a government commission to Ukraine together with an army led by S. Zholkivskyi. After learning about this, the Cossacks set up camp above the Uzyn River near Bila Tserkva. During October 8–17, Polish–Zaporozhian negotiations took place, as a result of which the Rostavy Agreement was signed. When concluding this agreement, Sahaidachny and his superiors succeeded to a large extent in leveling the anti-Cossack program of the government commissars. At the same time, the clauses of this document regarding the withdrawal of Cossacks from the Zaporozhian Army and the limitation of their place of residence on the territory of the kingdom posed a considerable threat to Cossacks, primarily the "new". In general, this agreement was largely decorative and contained controversial clauses.

In mid-November to early December 1619, Konashevych-Sahaidachny decided to take advantage of the personal struggle between Khan Janibek-Girey and Shagin-Girey. He led a Cossack army numbering about 5,000 soldiers to the Tatar uluses with an exit near Perekop. A battle took place near Perekop with about 8,000 troops of Khan Janibek-Girey. The Zaporozhians inflicted significant losses on the enemy and also freed many Christian captives.

=== Restoration of the Orthodox church hierarchy ===
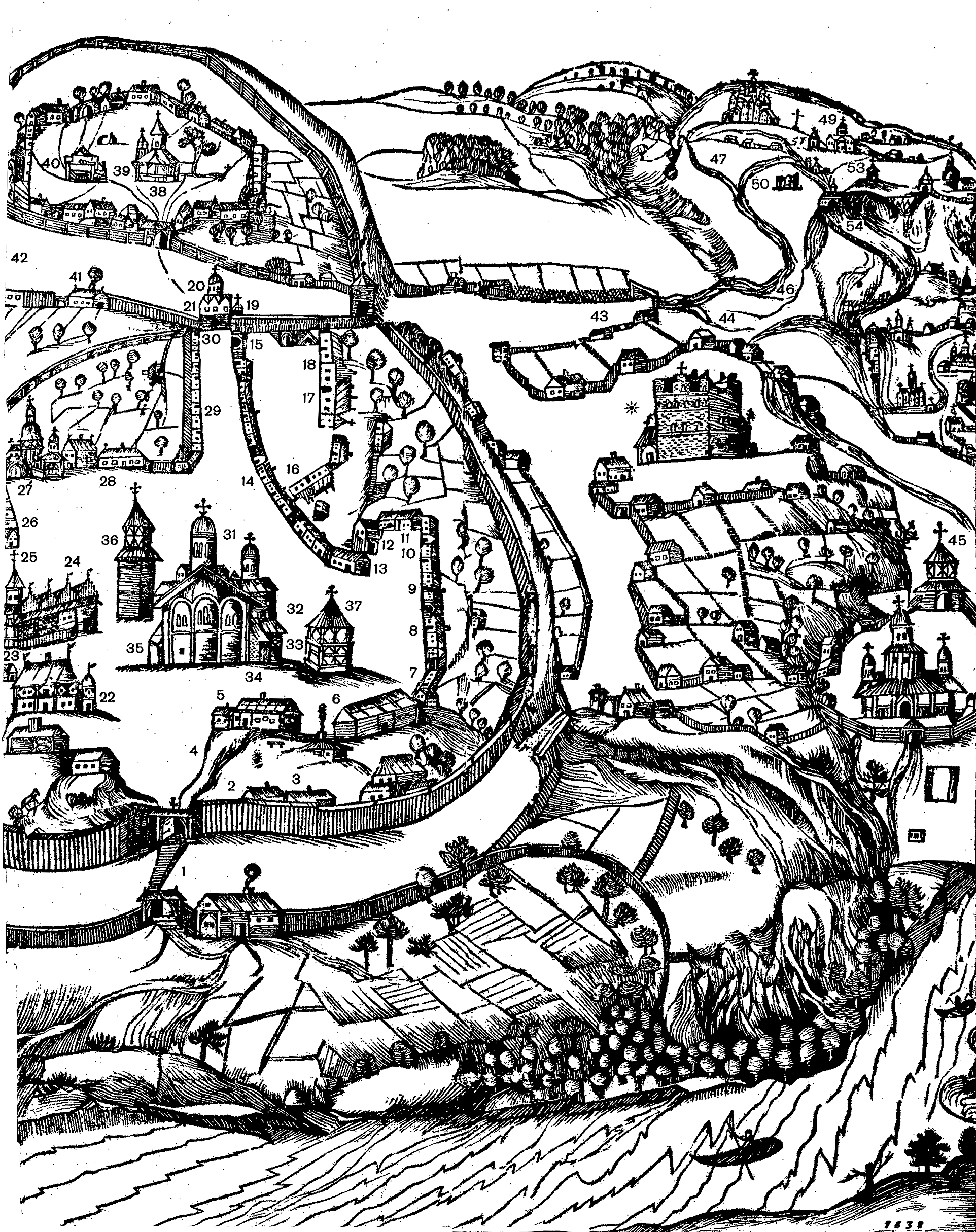
A plan of Kyiv from around Sahaidachny's times, showing the city's numerous churches and monasteries, 1638

In 1619, Job Boretsky, one of the founders of the Kyiv Brotherhood, was elected abbot of the St. Michael's Golden-Domed Monastery in Kyiv. Church and secular Orthodox circles of Ukraine rallied around him. As one of the leaders of the Orthodox brotherhood, Job Boretsky actively cooperated with the foreman of the Zaporizhzhian Army, in particular with hetman Peter Sahaydachny. In this environment, the idea appeared, contrary to the prohibitions of the Polish–Lithuanian Commonwealth, to restore the Orthodox hierarchy of the Kyiv Metropolitanate, which was lost as a result of the Brest Church Union of 1596. Petro Sahaidachny took the most active part in the meetings regarding the restoration of the church hierarchy, whose opinion, as a representative of the Zaporozhian Army, was significant. The Cossacks were a collective member of the Kyiv Brotherhood, and Sahaidachny became the founder (guardian) of the school founded under him, providing it with funds. Petro Sahaidachny joined this Orthodox brotherhood in 1616 together with "the entire Zaporozhian army".

In January 1620, following the limitation of Cossack privileges and dissatisfaction of Ruthenian (Ukrainian) population with the policies of Polish–Lithuanian Commonwealth, Sahaidachny sent his ambassadors to Moscow asking to enter into Russian service. These initial negotiations became important in forming Russian-Ukrainian relations. Potential uprising and Cossacks joining Russia was avoided after promises made by the Commonwealth authorities to meet Cossack demands in the following year.

The time of the embassy to the Tsardom of Russia was not chosen by chance. It was at that time that the Patriarch of Jerusalem Feofan III was in Moscow, who had the goal of consecrating the Patriarch of Moscow, Metropolitan Philaret, and his affairs in the Tsardom of Russia were already nearing completion. Feofan had the authority given to him by the Ecumenical Patriarch Timofey "to manage all bishopric matters in the dioceses subordinate to the Tsargorod Patriarch", that is, in the Kyiv Metropolitanate as well. At the same time, as a patriarch, he had the right to ordain church hierarchies. The same embassy conducted preliminary negotiations with the Jerusalem Patriarch Feofan III regarding the possibility of consecrating the episcopate of the Ukrainian-Belarusian Orthodox Church. Petro Konashevych provided a personal guarantee of the patriarch's safety upon entering Ukraine.

At the beginning of March 1620, Sahaidachny had to repel an attack by the Tatars. Catching up with them near the Tashlyk River, he defeated the enemy and freed hundreds of captives. Immediately after the battle, the hetman returned to Kyiv.

On March 25, in Kyiv, the hetman with several thousand Cossacks solemnly met the Patriarch of Jerusalem, asking him on behalf of the entire Zaporizhzhian Army for forgiveness of sins for shedding the blood of Christians during the Moscow campaign of 1618. A clear demonstration of the political support of the Orthodox Church was the entry of the Hetman together with the entire Zaporozhian Army into the Kyiv (Epiphany) Brotherhood, which took place between May 27 and June 5, 1620. Hetman was among those who actively convinced Theophanes III to restore the higher hierarchy of the Orthodox Church.

On 20 June 1620, Sahaidachny organized an attack from land and sea on Perekop by a 17,000-strong Cossack army. The fighting began on July 9; according to S. Zholkevskyi, the campaign was quite successful. At the end of this expedition, the Cossacks decided to go to sea, which Sahaidachny categorically denied. Disgruntled Cossacks, primarily discharged from the Zaporizhzhian Army following the terms of the Rostavy Treaty of 1619, as well as those who, contrary to his prohibitions, wanted to go to sea, opposed the hetman. Sahaidachny was deprived of power, and Yakov Borodavka was elected as the new hetman. Immediately after his election, on July 26, 1620, Yakov Borodavka took about a hundred boats to the Black Sea and devastated Varna.

In October 1620, Patriarch Feofan III, together with two other Eastern hierarchs - Metropolitan Neofitus of Sofia and Bishop Avramiy of Stragon, consecrated the hegumen of the St. Michael's Golden-Domed Monastery, Job Boretsky, as Metropolitan of Kyiv and Galicia, and six more hierarchs to the rank of bishops. In November 1620, P. Konashevych-Sahaidachny, together with the newly ordained bishop Yosif Kurcevych, spoke at the regular session of the Sejm of the Polish–Lithuanian Commonwealth, where he raised the question of royal recognition of the consecrations performed by Patriarch Feofan. However, despite the desire to get the support of the Cossacks in the war with the Ottoman Empire, the Seimas of the Polish–Lithuanian Commonwealth did not support this proposal.

In February 1621, Konashevych-Sahaidachny accompanied several hundred Cossacks to the Moldavian border of the Patriarch of Jerusalem Feofan III, who was returning home after the ordination of Orthodox hierarchs in Ukraine. The Zaporizhians succeeded in this task, and on the 20 February, the Patriarch of Jerusalem reached Sorok.

== Khotyn War ==
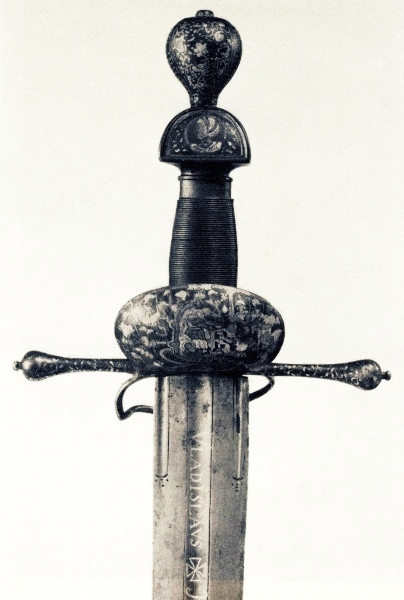
A sword gifted to Sahaidachny by king Vladislaus Vasa as a sign of gratitude for his services at the Battle of Khotyn

=== Preparation for war ===
After the defeat at Tsetsora, the Polish–Lithuanian Commonwealth found itself in a dangerous situation. For help in the fight against the Ottoman Sultan Osman II, the government of the Polish–Lithuanian Commonwealth turned to the Cossacks. On February 28, the royal envoy B. Obalkovskyi arrived in Sich and began negotiations with the Cossack foreman, handing over the royal flag and 40 thousand zlotys. However, the Zaporozhians did not give a clear answer, pointing out the need for the recognition of the newly-ordained Orthodox hierarchs by the royal authorities.

On June 15–17, 1621, a general council of registered Cossacks and non-registered Cossacks met in the Sukha Dibrova tract (a tract between Bila Tserkva and Rzhyshchiv). Orthodox clergy and representatives of the Polish–Lithuanian Commonwealth also took part in it. The Commonwealth promised payment to the Cossacks, as well as concessions in religious matters. The Rada elected Yakov Borodavka, a representative of unregistered Cossacks, as hetman and accepted the proposal of the Sejm of the Polish–Lithuanian Commonwealth to take part in the war against the Ottoman Empire. At the same time, an embassy was formed for the king of the Polish–Lithuanian Commonwealth, headed by Petro Sahaidachny, who had great authority in Warsaw.

After the council, the Cossack army (more than 41,000 Zaporozhians and several hundred Don Cossacks) set off on a campaign to the Khotyn fortress, where the 150,000-strong Ottoman army led by Osman II was already on its way. During July 20–31, Konashevych-Sahaidachny was received in Warsaw together with the embassy by the Archbishop of Gniezno Wawrzyniec Gembicki, as well as Sigismund III Vasa.

As a result of diplomatic negotiations, Petro Sahaidachny obtained from the government of the Polish–Lithuanian Commonwealth the satisfaction for the demands of the Cossacks: the abolition of the position of senior over the Cossacks by the government of the Commonwealth; recognition of the power of the hetman elected by the Cossack council over all of Ukraine; cancellation of the Sejm's resolution on the restriction of Cossack rights and freedoms; and Ukrainians' freedom of religion.

From Warsaw, Sahaidachny went to the camp of the Commonwealth forces near Khotyn, where he was received with great honor by the commander-in-chief of the Polish–Lithuanian Commonwealth army, Jan Karol Chodkiewicz. However, there was no Cossack army there, for unknown reasons, Yakiv Borodavka stayed behind, and then he concentrated most of the army in Mohyliv, sending the others around Ukraine. After discussing military plans with the Commonwealth army command, Sahaidachny, accompanied by three regiments of Commonwealth cavalry, set out to meet the Cossacks. On the way, Sahaidachny fell into an Ottoman ambush. He managed to escape, but was wounded in the arm. Despite his injury, Sahaidachny moved to the other bank of the Dniester and reached the Cossack army. On August 25, after Sahaidachny's arrival, the Cossack council was held near Mohyliv, where Peter Sahaidachny was elected hetman instead of Borodavka. The old hetman was accused of tactical miscalculations that led to the death of several Cossack units and was imprisoned and, according to one version, after some time was executed by the decision of the Cossack military council.

Despite the obstacle of the Ottoman army, once he received the mace, Sahaidachny faced the task of uniting with the Polish–Lithuanian Commonwealth. The hetman managed with this task and on September 1, avoiding pursuit, approached Khotyn with small losses and camped in the Dniester valley. Active hostilities began in September.

=== Course of battle ===
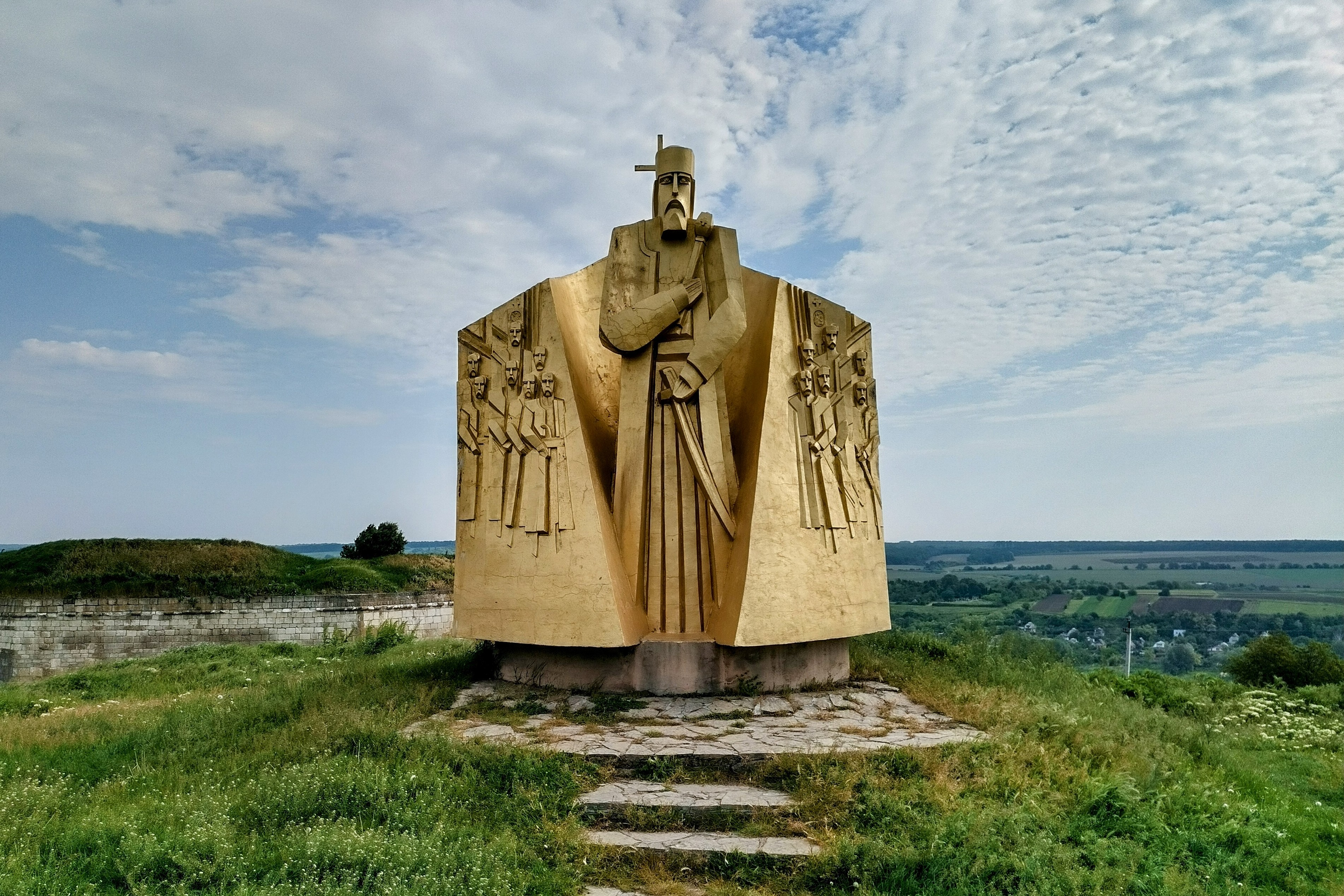
Monument to the hetman and his Cossacks on the battlefield of Khotyn

During the Khotyn War, hetman Sahaidachny's military skill was demonstrated. According to the plan of the Polish–Lithuanian Commonwealth, the Cossack troops held the defense of the Dniester valley. The Zaporozhian regiments were led by colonels Ivan Zyshkar, Bohdan Konsha, Timofy Fedorovych, Fedir Biloborodko, Adam Pidigirskyi, Sydir Chornyi (Semakovich), Ivan Gardzeya.

The first minor skirmishes near Khotyn began on August 30, when a 5,000-strong Tatar detachment attacked the foresters (the Polish–Lithuanian Commonwealth light mercenary cavalry). However, only on September 2, the main units of Osman II began to approach. Without waiting for the arrival of all the troops, the sultan decided to crush the Zaporozhian camp with a concentrated blow. However, a massive attack by the Ottoman army was repulsed by Cossack firearms and artillery. This angered the Ottoman sultan and he, making a vow to refrain from food until the Cossacks were destroyed, sent his selected troops. In the meantime, German mercenaries came to the aid of the Zaporozhians. Together they held the defense until dusk. Already on the first day of fighting, the army of Osman suffered significant losses, in particular, the Beylerbey of Bosnia – Husein Pasha was killed.

On the morning of September 3, the Sultan gave the order to defeat the Zaporozhians. Addressing his army, he said: "If we don't defeat the Cossacks, they will take us for lakhs" (that is, they will disgrace themselves as soldiers). The Ottoman army launched an attack with active artillery and gunfire. However, upon approaching the camp, the Zaporozhians met the enemy with fire, and thanks to the organization of a quick regrouping of his troops, Sahaidachny not only stopped the enemy's attack but also organized a rapid counterattack. Osman II's army lost ten to twenty thousand soldiers during the battle.

The next day, the Sultan again ordered to take the Zaporozhian camp and personally visited the command post located in the town of Horodyshche. Ottoman units tried three times to storm the Cossack camp but failed each time. Already in the evening, having withstood the artillery barrage, the Cossacks organized a successful counterattack, breaking into Osman II's camp. By killing the soldiers and destroying their tents, the Cossacks caused panic in the Ottoman army. Realizing that the turning point in the war had come, Sahaidachny sent a messenger to Jan Khodkevych with a request to withdraw all the troops from the attack. But the old hetman was afraid to send an army to support the Zaporozhians, referring to the late hour. Having received a refusal, the Cossacks returned to their camp with a lot of booty, before destroying the Ottoman artillery. According to eyewitnesses, about 15 thousand enemies died during the attack.

After three days of continuous assaults, the Ottoman command was forced to take a break. From September 7, the Ottoman troops again returned to assault operations, but with a much lower intensity. Convinced that the defenders of Khotyn could not be taken by frontal attacks, the Ottoman command set about the methodical organization of the siege of the Polish-Ukrainian troops. On September 14, Osman II was approached by several thousand reinforcements led by Beylerbey Buda Karakash Pasha, who had the fame of an unrivaled commander among the Ottomans. Karakash Pasha told the Sultan that if he got the janissaries at his disposal, he would defeat the enemy in two hours. After receiving information from the defectors, Karakash Pasha decided to strike at the weakest part of the defense — the Polish-Lithuanian Commonwealth camp. The next day, he led an army of 27,000, but thanks to the heroic defense of the defenders, the assault was repulsed, and Karakash Pasha himself was mortally wounded. After receiving this news, the Ottoman Sultan lost hope for a quick victory in the war.

Considering the numerical superiority of the Ottoman army in terms of manpower and artillery, Sahaidachny decided to launch a night war, which not only inflicted significant losses on the enemy but also undermined his morale. Cossack night raids began at the beginning of the month, but the largest and most effective operations took place in the second half of September. On the night of September 18–19, an 8,000-strong Cossack army struck the right flank of the Ottoman camp. The Cossacks managed to destroy several thousand of the enemy before the Ottoman forces began to recover, while they returned with almost no losses. On the night of September 21–22, the Zaporozhians again went on a night sortie and killed at least a thousand enemies, while they managed to destroy the Ottoman commanders-in-chief, Circassian Pasha and Togadnji Pasha. Former Grand Vizier Husein Pasha narrowly escaped. On the night of September 23–24, the Zaporozhians crossed to the left bank of the Dniester and destroyed the Ottoman camp located there, where about a thousand enemies were killed.

On September 24, Jan Khodkevich, Commander-in-Chief of the Polish-Lithuanian Commonwealth, died. The Ottoman command decided that this news would demoralize the defenders of Khotyn, and began to prepare a new large-scale attack. On September 25, the Ottoman troops launched an unsuccessful attack along the entire front line, but the main preparations were made for the general assault planned for September 28.

Considering that the war began to take on a protracted nature, on September 28, 1621, Sultan Osman II launched a general offensive. The general assault began after many hours of cannon fire. Ottoman troops launched a simultaneous attack on the units of the Polish-Lithuanian Commonwealth and the Cossack camp. However, despite the significant support from the artillery, the war-weary and scattered Ottoman troops did not show much energy and will to victory. The Ottoman units that stormed the Cossack camp tried to surround it from the flanks, but Sahaidachny, having exhausted the enemy, organized a counterattack that caused significant losses to the enemy. During the day, the Ottoman troops carried out several more attacks, but after suffering significant losses (from one to several thousand soldiers), they were once again forced to retreat.

=== Khotyn Peace Treaty ===
On September 29, peace negotiations began between the command of the Polish-Cossack and Ottoman-Tatar troops. They ended with the signing of the agreement on October 9, 1621. On the morning of October 10, Osman II's army left its positions. According to the peace agreement, the parties agreed on the restoration of diplomatic relations. The border between the Polish–Lithuanian Commonwealth and the Ottoman Empire was established along the Dniester River; The Ottomans and the Crimean Khanate were forbidden to raid Ukrainian and Polish lands; Zaporozhians were forbidden to go on expeditions to the Crimea and the Ottoman Empire.

On October 11, Stanisław Żurawiński and Jakub Sobieski took part in the Cossack council, where they reported on the concluded Polish–Ottoman treaty. On the night of October 11–12, the entire Cossack army secretly moved to the left bank of the Dniester and stood near Braga.

From there, the Zaporizhians marched to Kamianets, where on October 17, Prince Władysław thanked all the participants in the battles near Khotyn and announced the disbandment of the Polish–Lithuanian Commonwealth.

The consequences of the Battle of Khotyn had great international significance. This battle forced the Ottoman Empire to abandon its plans to conquer Europe. The defeat of the Ottomans near Khotyn led to the weakening of the Sultan's internal political power. Already in the spring of 1622, a military mutiny broke out against Osman II, as a result of which he was strangled, and his uncle Mustafa I returned to the throne.

== Return to Kyiv ==
Peter Sahaidachny returned to Kyiv accompanied by the royal physician in a carriage presented by Sigismund III. The hetman settled in his own house in Kyiv, appointing Pyotr Zhitskyi as executive hetman. Despite the illness, the hetman continued to actively engage in the political arena. In January 1622, Sahaidachny refused the royal commissioners to consider the demand to reduce the army to 3,000 people without convening a general Cossack council. At the end of the winter of 1622, a Cossack embassy was sent to Warsaw with a request to the king of the Polish–Lithuanian Commonwealth to keep the promises made earlier, but no particular results were achieved.

At the end of his life, he contributed to the renewal of churches in Kyiv, the construction of a new one in the Floriv Monastery, he sent fifteen-thousand red and gold coins to the Lviv Brotherhood School.

== Death and burial ==
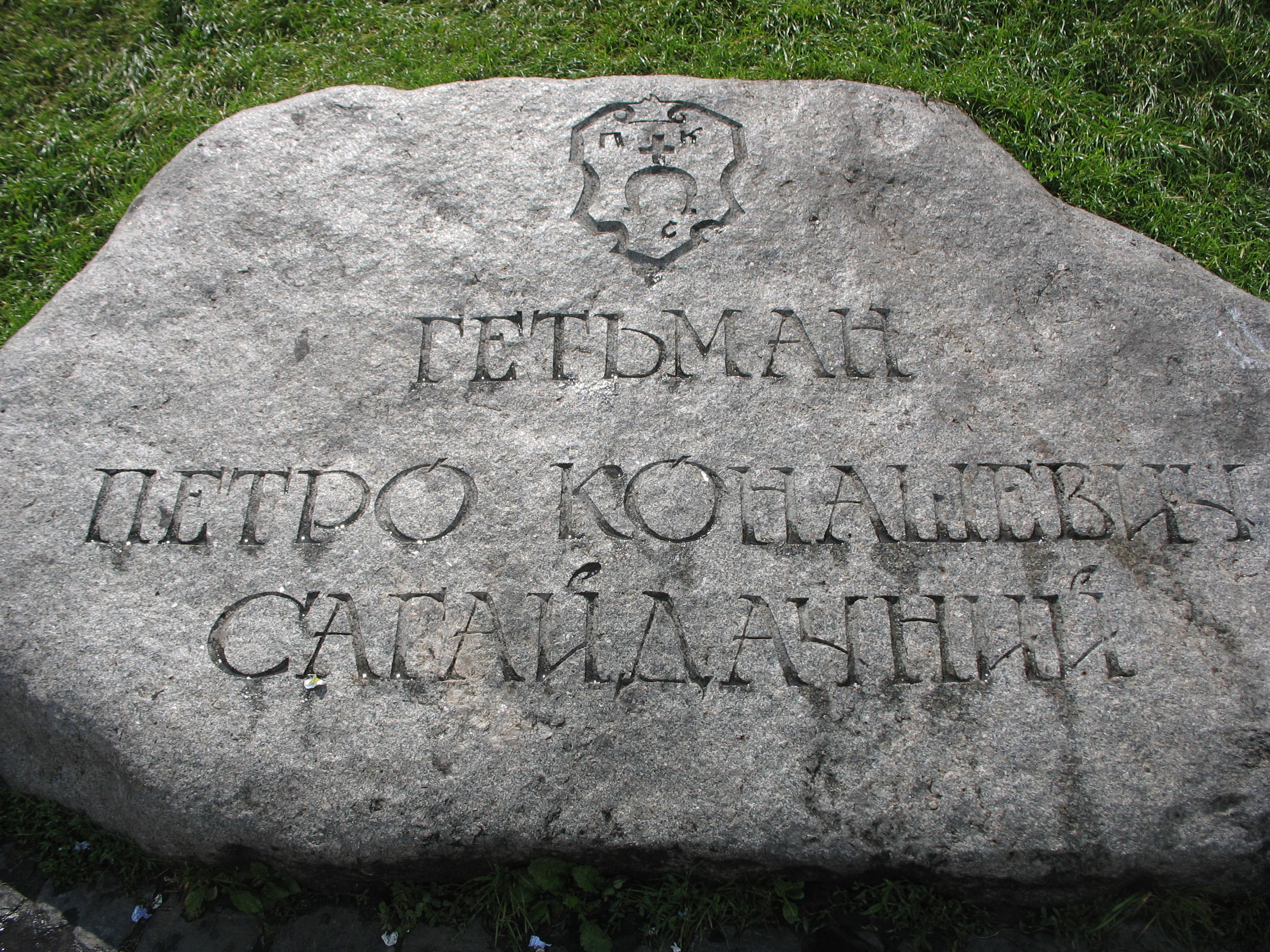
Memorial stone to hetman Sahaidachny near his burial place on Kontraktova Square in Kyiv

Five days before his death, Sahaidachny made a will, according to which he bequeathed his property to educational, charitable, and religious purposes, in particular to the Kyiv Brotherhood and the Lviv Brotherhood school, so that poor children could study with the income from this property. For his wife and close relatives, the hetman appointed guardians: Kyiv Metropolitan Job Boretsky and close associate Olifer Holub.

On April 10, 1622, Petro Sahaidachny died as a result of complications from a gunshot wound to the hand, which he received during the battle near Khotyn. The funeral of the hetman fell on Providna (Fomina) Sunday, April 28, 1622. His comrades-in-arms, residents of Kyiv, gathered at the crowded funeral. During the funeral, the students of the Kyiv Fraternal School read "Poems for the Sad Burial of Hetman Sahaidachny" dedicated to this sad event by Fr. Cassian Sakowicz, who glorified the exploits of the Ukrainian commander and his service to the Christian faith.

Peter Sahaidachny was buried in the Epiphany Cathedral of the Kyiv Brotherhood Monastery, which was later called the "Sahaydachny Monastery". His silver cross was on the "throne of St. John the Chrysostom" of this church.

In 1690–1693, during the reconstruction of the Church of the Epiphany of the Kyiv Brotherhood Monastery, the hetman's grave was moved under the southern wall of the cathedral. In 1935, the church was destroyed and information about this burial was finally lost. Currently, the provisional grave of Konashevich has been reconstructed on the territory of the Kyiv-Mohyla Academy. In 2023, according to the Department of Cultural Heritage Protection of the KMDA, on the territory of the Kyiv-Mohyla Academy, archaeologists will conduct excavations at the site of the remains of the Epiphany Cathedral and try to find the grave of Hetman Peter Sahaidachny.

== Legacy ==
Saint Petro Konashevych-Sahaidachny
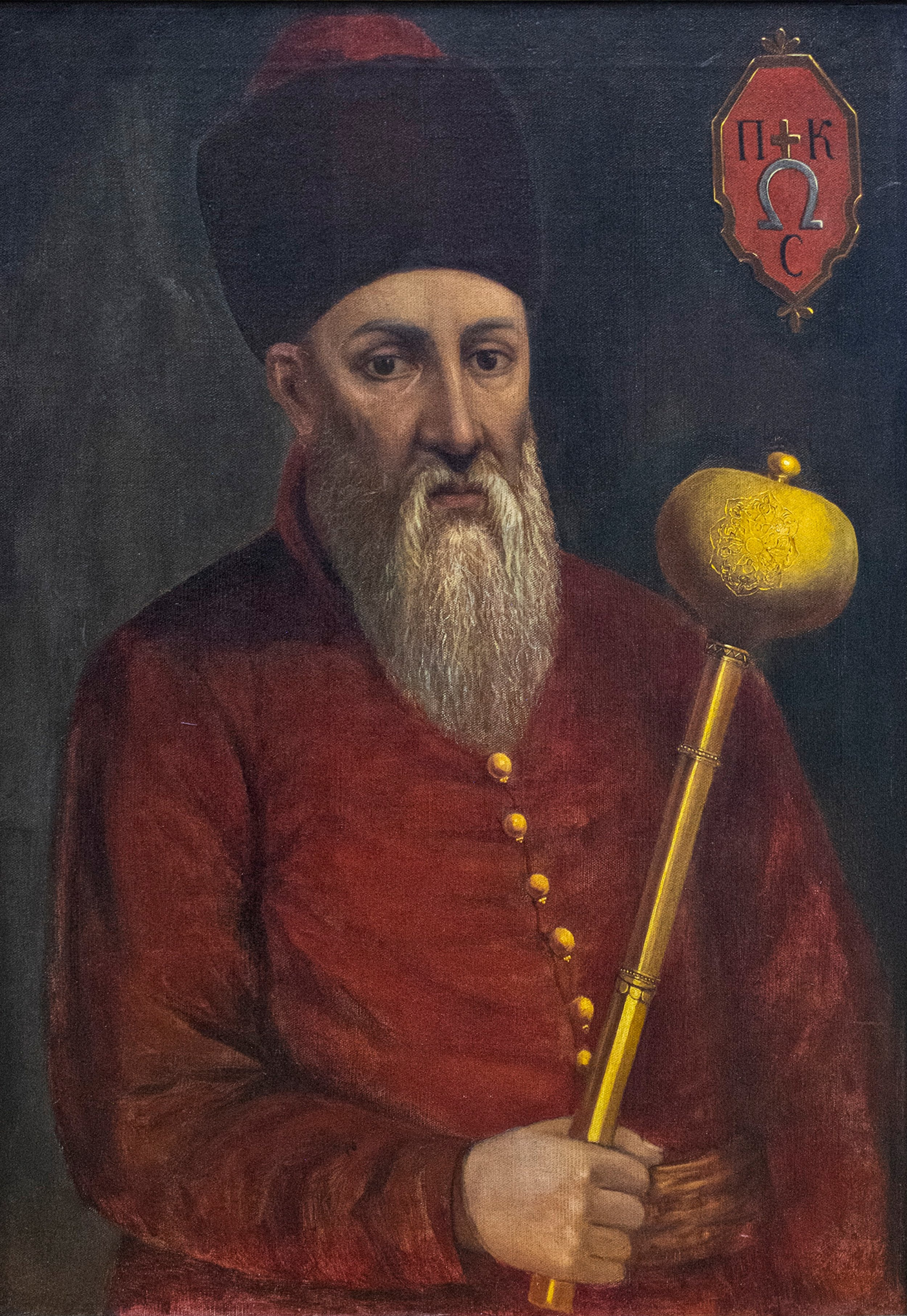

Right-Believing Hetman
- Venerated in: Orthodox Church of Ukraine
- Canonized: 25 May 2011 by Ukrainian Autocephalous Orthodox Church
- Feast: 7 April

=== Historiography ===
Prominent Ukrainian historian Mykhailo Hrushevskyi considered Sahaidachny to be a key figure in Ukrainian history of the early 17th century due to his patronage of the Eastern Orthodox church and defense of Ukrainians' national rights. At the same time, he criticized the hetman for his naive and "old fashioned" belief in promises made by the Polish government in respect to Cossack autonomy and rights of the Orthodox population and saw him as a preferable ally for Polish authorities in comparison to other Cossack leaders. According to Hrushevskyi, Poland's refusal to satisfy the demands for Cossack autonomy compromised Sahaidachny's policies of co-operation and led to increasing conflicts between Zaporozhians and the government after the hetman's death.

=== Canonization ===
In 2011, by the decision of the Synod of Bishops of the Ukrainian Autocephalous Orthodox Church, Petro Sahaidachny was canonized at the local level in the rank of "pious hetman". By the decision of the Holy Synod of the OCU of August 21, 2020, the name of the holy hetman Peter (Konashevich-Sahaidachny) was included in the Lunar Month (church calendar). April 7 is established as a day of memory for his general church veneration.

=== Memorials and namesakes ===
- Frigate "Hetman Sahaidachny" – a flagship of the Ukrainian Navy for over 20 years.
- National Ground Forces Academy in Lviv is named after hetman Petro Sahaydachyi.
- In 2001 a monument dedicated to Petro Konashevich-Sagaydachniy was erected in Kyiv, on Kontraktova Square. The authors of the monument are Valeriy Shvetsov, Oles Sydoruk and Boris Krylov.
- After the March 2014 Russian annexation of Crimea the monument to Konashevych-Sahaidachny in Sevastopol was removed and handed over to Kharkiv. (Where it was unveiled in August 2015.)
- In Ukraine, there are a number of Petro Sahaidachny streets.
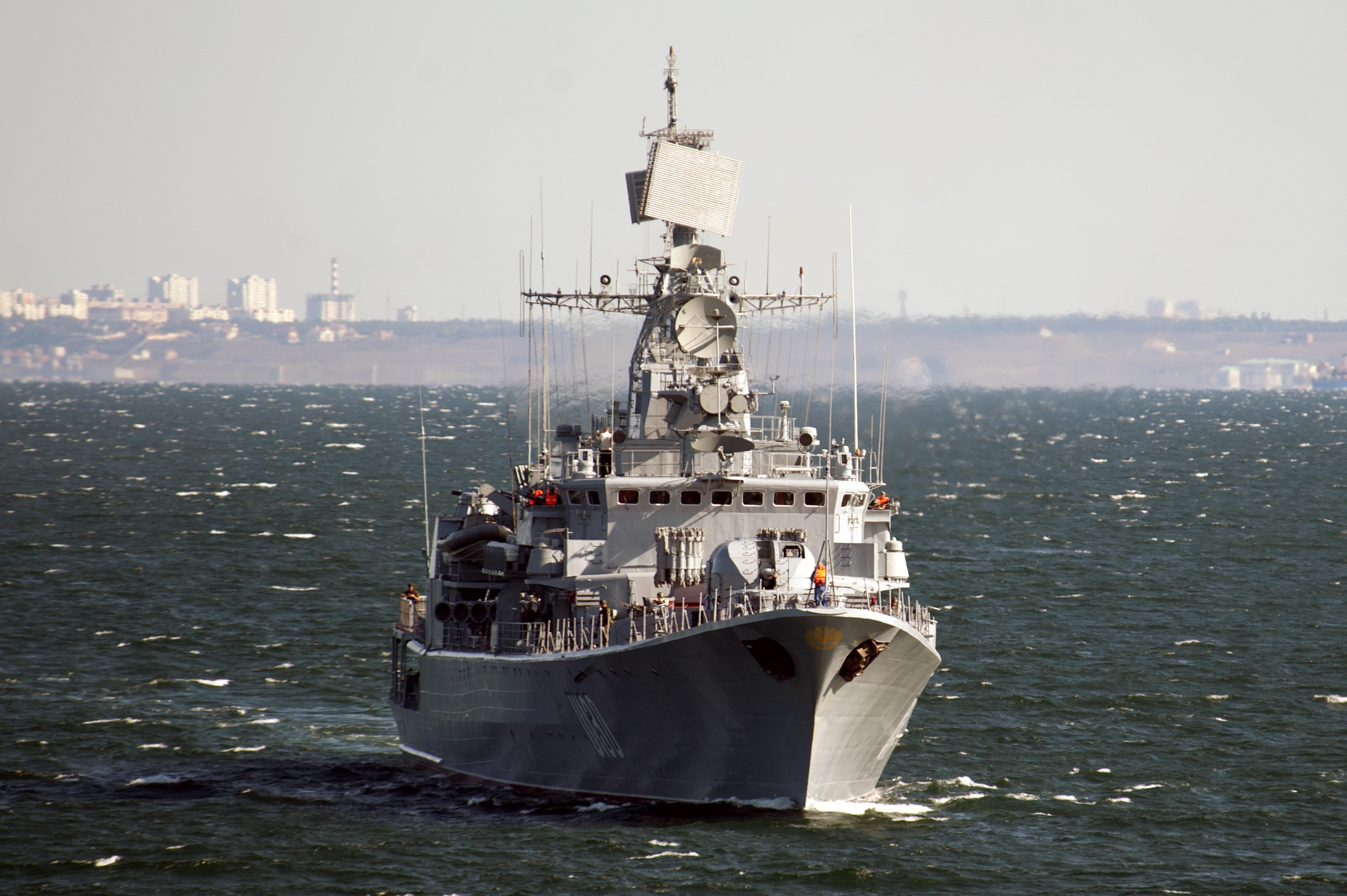
Krivak class frigate Hetman Sahaydachniy was the flagship of the Ukrainian navy until scuttled in Mykolaiv on 28 February during the 2022 Russian Invasion of Ukraine to prevent its capture by Russian forces.

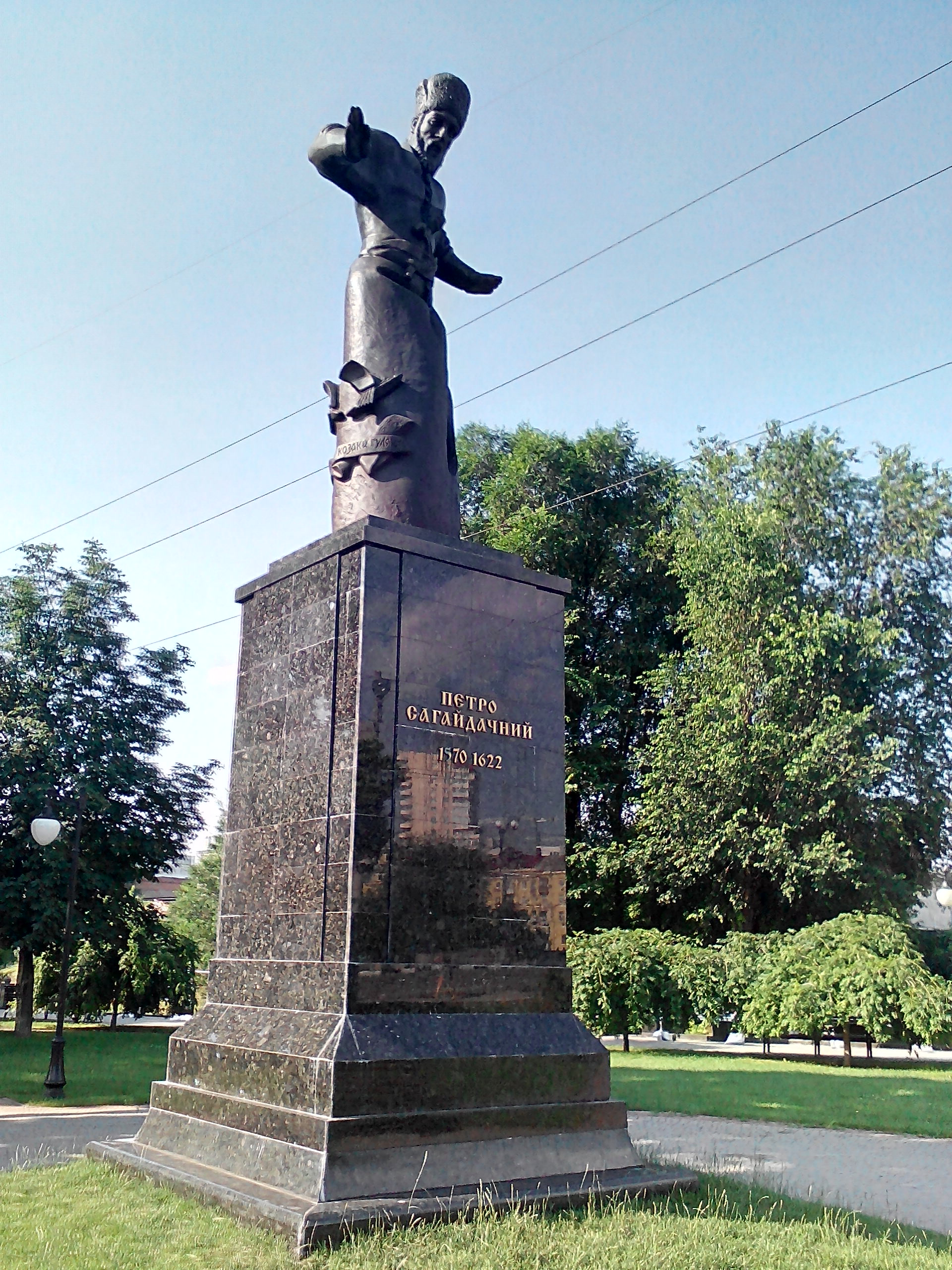
Monument to Konashevych-Sahaidachny in Kharkiv; initially installed in Sevastopol, it was transferred to the city after the Russian annexation of Crimea.

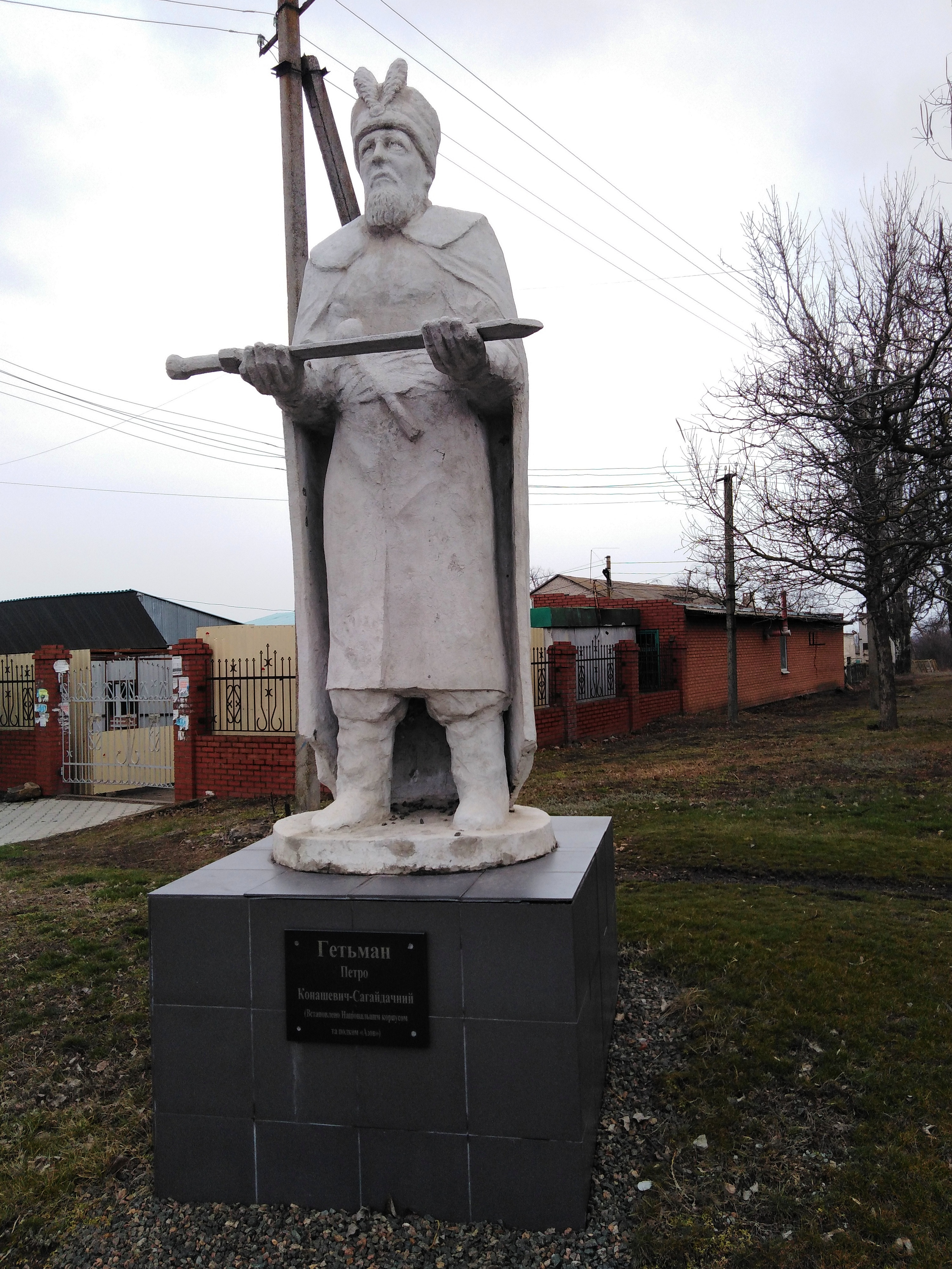
Monument to Konashevych-Sahaidachny in Manhush; unveiled in October 2017 at the initiative of the far-right political party National Corps and the Azov Regiment. The monument was dismantled on 7 May 2022 by Russian occupation authorities during the 2022 Russian invasion of Ukraine who claimed that the monument would be redeployed to an unmentioned museum.

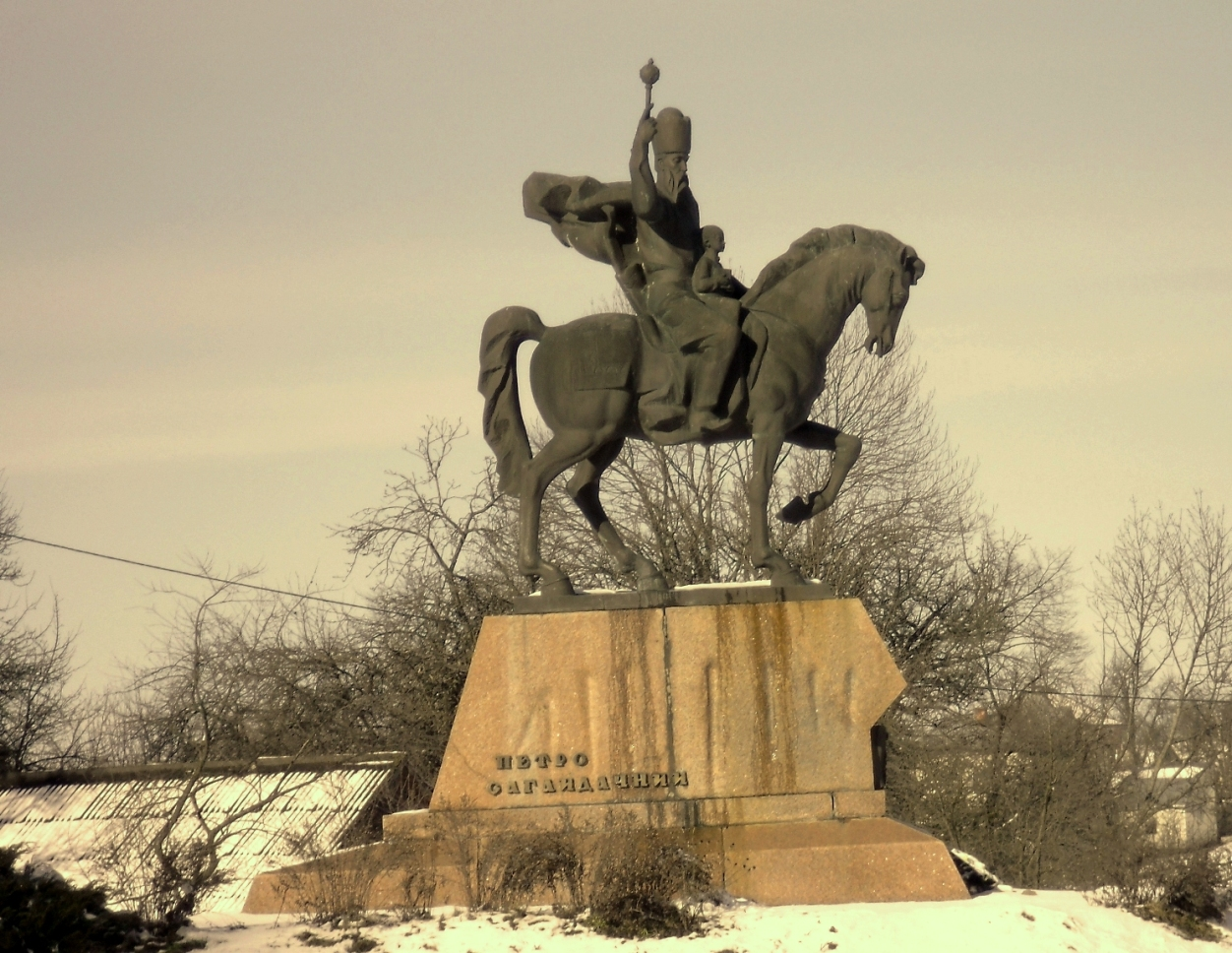
Monument to Hetman Petro Sahaidachny in his native village of Kulchytsi

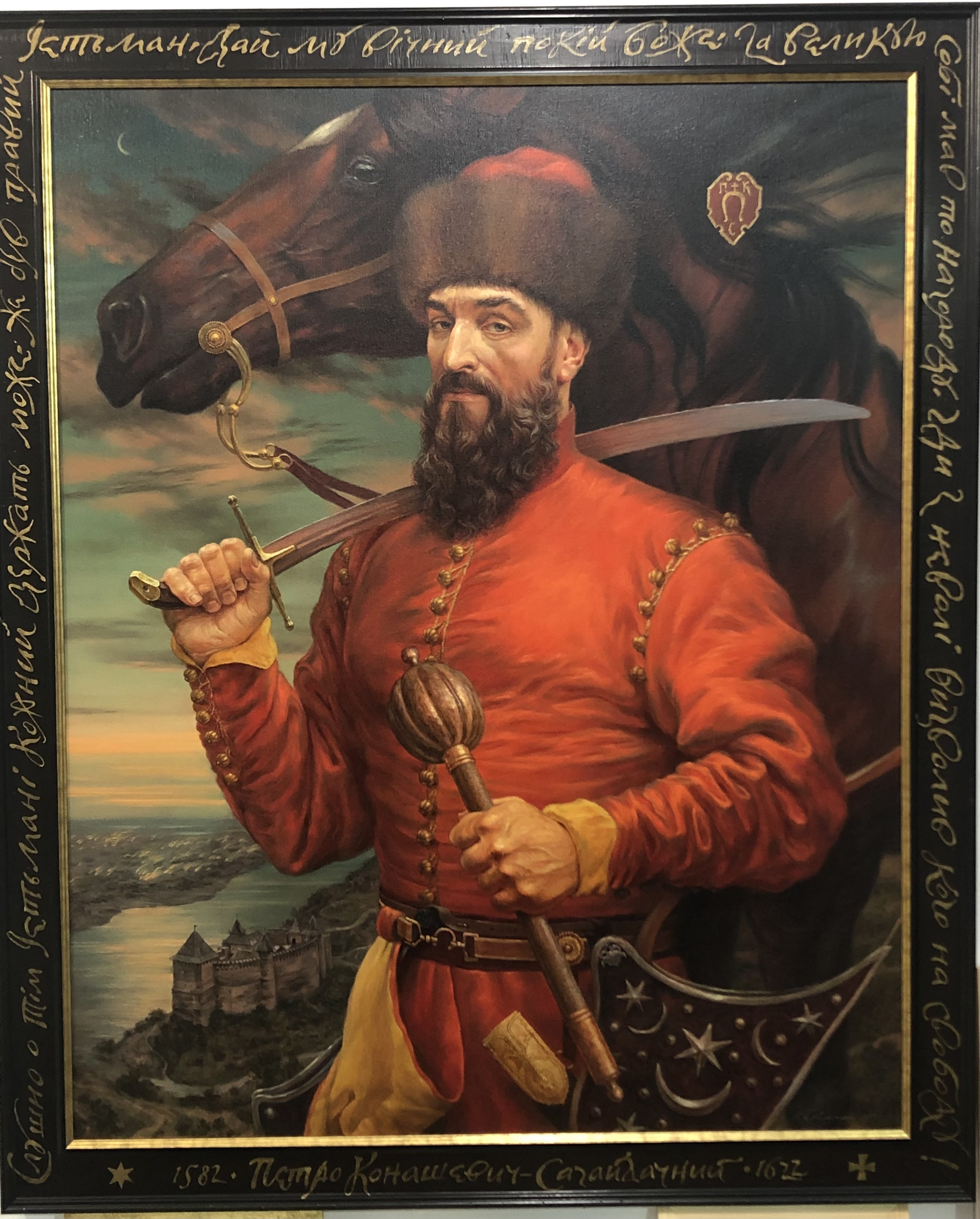
A modern anachronistic depiction of Sahaidachnyi

== See also ==
- Hetman of Zaporizhian Cossacks
