= Battle of Yelets =

1618 battle in Moscow

- Part of Prince Władysław's March on Moscow
Date	17–20 July, 1618
Location	Yelets (now - Lipetsk Oblast, Russia)
Result	Cossack victory

Belligerents
Zaporozhian Cossacks	Tsardom of Russia

Commanders and leaders
Petro Sahaidachny	Andrey Polyev †; Ivan Khrushchev †

Strength
20,000 Cossacks	7,000 (1,800 was city garrison)

Casualties and losses
Significant	1,100 dead and wounded (Civilians and Soldiers)
- 640 civilian prisoners of war

The Battle of Yelets was the capture of the Muscovite fortress by the Cossacks of Hetman Petro Konashevych-Sahaidachny at the beginning of the campaign against Moscow. Took place on 17-20 July 1618. The Cossacks destroyed a powerful garrison that could have threatened the rear of the army and took a large ransom from the townspeople.

== Background ==
In April 1617, Polish King Władysław Waza set out from Warsaw to march on Moscow. The aim of the campaign was to regain the throne of the Moscow tsar (in 1610, the Moscow boyars had elected Władysław as tsar). In the spring of 1618, the crown army camped near Vyazma. However, due to the lack of money for salaries for the soldiers, the army began to melt. The government of the Polish-Lithuanian Commonwealth turned to the Zaporozhian Army for help.

In June 1618, a 20,000-strong Cossack army led by Hetman Petro Konashevych-Sahaidachny marched on Moscow, choosing the southern route to attack - from Putivl. There, Moscow's forces were weaker than in the Smolensk direction.

On 7 July, the Cossacks stormed Livny, one of the most fortified cities in southern Muscovy. The voivode, Mykyta Cherkasky, was taken prisoner, and another, Petro Danilov, was killed in action. The Cossacks destroyed all the defenders of the fortress. 10 July - the Cossacks marched to Yelets.

== Strength of the parties ==
Yelets was a well-fortified city with strong artillery. The garrison was also strong, with at least 1,800 soldiers - nobles, "boyar's children," riflemen, and Cossacks. According to the "discharge" lists, there were 885 "boyar's children" in the city. Also, on the eve of the Cossacks' arrival, reinforcements arrived - an unknown number of soldiers of the Mtsensk voivode. According to a letter from Moscow intercepted by the foresters, there were 7,000 soldiers in Yelets. Historian Petro Sas considers such data to be exaggerated. In his opinion, Sahaidachny decided to capture Yelets at any cost, rather than bypass the city, so as not to leave large enemy forces in the rear.

The army of P. Konashevych-Sahaidachny consisted of about 20 thousand Cossacks and dzhuras.

== Military actions ==
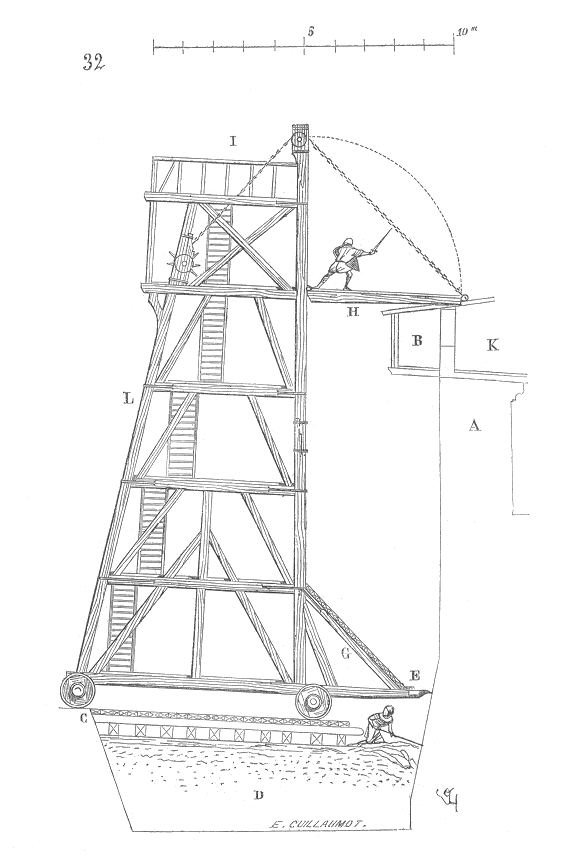
Siege tower

The Cossacks approached Yelets on 16 July. They set up camp on the banks of the Yelets and Lunka rivers. Preparations for the assault lasted for several days: the Cossacks were making tura (wooden mobile towers) to be brought under the walls of the fortress. The garrison of the city tried to prevent this by carrying out raids. During one of these raids, the Muscovites were ambushed by the Cossacks and suffered heavy losses.

On the night of 19 to 20 July, the Cossacks surrounded the Yelets stockade from all sides. The storming of the Novosilsk and Livensk gates lasted all night: the Muscovites repelled three attacks. At dawn, unexpectedly for the besieged, the Cossack units attacked from the northeast, from Mount Argamak. The fierce battle for the Argamak Gate lasted until about two in the afternoon. Despite the stubborn resistance of the Muscovites, the Cossacks broke through the fortifications.

Moscow voivodes Andrey Polev and Ivan Khrushchev tried to organise defence inside the city, on the outskirts of the citadel, but under the onslaught of the Cossacks, the Muscovites could not resist and fled. The Cossacks pushed the defeated defenders of Yelets to the Sosna River. Muscovites threw themselves into the water to save themselves. The Cossacks fished them out of the river and took them prisoner. This is how the voivode A. Polev and the tsar's under-secretary S. Bredikhin were captured.

Several hundred Muscovites led by Khrushchev retreated to the citadel. From there, they sent parliamentarians to P. Konashevych-Sahaidachnyi, the priests of Yelets. The latter asked the Cossacks not to burn the town and not to kill its inhabitants. For this, they promised a ransom - the embassy from Moscow to Bakhchisarai was in Yelets, carrying "mention" (tribute) for the Crimean khan - 8,467 rubles. The Cossack hetman accepted these terms of surrender.

The Cossacks captured both voivodes and their wives, as well as tsarist diplomats M. Chelyustkin and S. Khrushchev, and other members of the embassy. The rest of the captured Moscow soldiers were released. Instead, 640 residents of Yelets were captured, according to a list compiled by Voivode Valuev in 1619. Most of the prisoners were young men aged 9 to 20. They were used by the Cossacks as jurassic servants. During the battles, the stockade and the post of Yelets were burned. Over the next few days, the Cossacks ravaged the city's outskirts.

== Casualties ==
In a letter to Prince Wladyslawa, Petro Konashevych-Sahaidachny wrote that many Cossacks were killed and wounded in the battles for Yelets. The Cossack hetman estimated enemy losses at 20,000 "military men" Which exceeds the size of the garrison by almost 10 times. From Moscow's "discharge" lists, we know about the deaths of at least 120 local "boyar's children" during the storming of the city. Another 31 died later from their wounds. The exact losses of representatives of other "serving" versts are unknown. According to the Russian researcher Yu. Chursin, more than 1,100 Muscovites were killed or captured during the battles for Yelets. This is the majority of the garrison and 11-14% of the entire population of the city at the time. Later studies show that the losses of the boyar children amount to 73 people, and for the Cossacks 250, the maintenance staff lost about 30 people, the total losses of the garrison in this case do not exceed 400.

== Consequences ==
The news of the fall of Livny and Yelets reached the neighbouring Moscow cities with lightning speed and caused panic. Hetman Sahaidachny sent part of his army, led by Colonel M. Doroshenko, to raid Ryazan. The voivodes of a number of towns on the Cossacks' route(Lebedyan, Dankov) fled, and the garrisons surrendered without a fight.

The memory of the devastation caused to Yelets by the Cossacks was preserved by the locals until the nineteenth century, considering it "the Lord's punishment for helping impostors".
