= List of wars involving Ukraine =

The following is a list of major conflicts fought by Ukraine, by Ukrainians or by regular armies during periods when independent states existed on the modern territory of Ukraine, from the Kievan Rus' times to the present day. It also includes wars fought outside Ukraine by Ukrainian military.

Kievan Rus' is considered the first Ukrainian state (together with Belarus and Russia), the Kingdom of Galicia–Volhynia (Ruthenia) its political successor, and after the period of domination by the Polish–Lithuanian Commonwealth the Cossack states (the Cossack Hetmanate and the Zaporozhian Sich). The Ukrainian Cossacks were also related to the Ottoman Empire and the Crimean Khanate, having many conflicts with them. By the late 18th century, Ukraine didn't have independent states anymore, because it was ruled by the more powerful states of the time, namely the Ottoman Empire, the Russian Empire and the Austrian Empire. There were several internal armed conflicts between various Ukrainian ideological factions (sometimes with foreign support) in the first half of the 20th century (especially during the 1917–1921 Ukrainian War of Independence and the 1939–1945 Second World War), but modern Ukrainian militaries (since 1917) have been mostly fighting with armies of neighbouring states, such as the Russian Provisional Government (Kiev Bolshevik Uprising November 1917), the Russian SFSR (Ukrainian War of Independence 1917–1921), the Second Polish Republic (Polish–Ukrainian War 1918–1919), Nazi Germany and the Soviet Union (Second World War and post-War resistance), and since 2014, the Russian Federation (Russo-Ukrainian War).

== Kievan Rus' (800s–1240) ==
This is a list of wars involving Kievan Rus' (c. 9th century–1240). (Note: The timespan of Kievan Rus' is generally dated from c. 880 to 1240, but its precise origins are shrouded in mystery, influenced by later distortions, and the subject of modern scholarly dispute. Because 'no adequate system of succession to the Kyivan throne was developed' after the death of Yaroslav the Wise (r. 1019–1054), a process of gradual political disintegration would commence. The Mongol siege and sack of Kiev in 1240 is generally held to mark the end of Kievan Rus'. Modern historians from Belarus, Russia, and Ukraine alike consider Kievan Rus' the first period of their modern countries' histories.) These wars involved Kievan Rus' (also known as Kyivan Rus') as a whole, or some of its principalities (Note: Principalities of Kievan Rus' between the 9th century and 1240 included Kiev (Kyiv), Beloozero, Chernigov (Chernihiv), Drutsk, Halych (Galicia), Jersika, Koknese, Murom, the Novgorod Republic, Novgorod-Seversk (Novhorod-Siversk), Peremyshl (Przemyśl), Pereyaslavl (Pereiaslav), Polotsk (Polatsk), Ryazan (Riazan), Terebovlia, Turov and Pinsk (Turau-Pinsk, Turovian Rus'), Vladimir-Suzdal (Rostov, Suzdalia), Volhynia (Volyn, Volodymyr), and Yaroslavl. Halych and Volhynia would be unified in 1199, and raised to the Kingdom of Galicia–Volhynia (Ruthenia) in 1253, but lost the (mostly destroyed) city of Kiev in 1240 to the Golden Horde. Pskov Land (Pleskov) was formally part of the Novgorod Republic before 1240, but eventually became the independent Pskov Republic in 1348. Vladimir-Suzdalia would fragment into several smaller principalities after 1240, such as Tver (1246), Moscow (Muscovy; 1263), and Novgorod-Suzdal (1341).) up to 1240. (Note: After the Mongol invasion of Kievan Rus' of 1237–1241 (including the 1240 sack of Kiev which ended Kievan Rus'), most of the surviving Rus' principalities (exceptions included the Novgorod Republic) were forced to pay tribute and homage to Batu Khan (residing in Sarai on the Volga) of the newly-established Mongol-Tatar Golden Horde.)

Victory of Kievan Rus' (and allies)
Defeat of Kievan Rus' (and allies)
Another result*

*e.g. result unknown or indecisive/inconclusive, result of internal conflict inside Kievan Rus', status quo ante bellum, or a treaty or peace without a clear result.

Date	Conflict	Combatant 1	Combatant 2	Result
830s	Paphlagonian expedition of the Rus'	Rus' Khaganate	Byzantine Empire	Unclear. The historicity of this conflict is questioned
860	Rus'–Byzantine War (860)	Rus' Khaganate	Byzantine Empire	Victory. The historicity of this conflict is questioned
c. 880s, c. 913, 943, 965, c. 1041 (Note: 'Sometime during the reign of Hasan Ibn Zaid, ruler of Tabaristan (r. 864–884), the Rus sailed into the Caspian Sea and unsuccessfully attacked the eastern shore at Abaskun. This was probably a raid on very small scale (...) Great raids, however, took place in c. 913, in 943, in 965 and in c. 1041.')	Caspian expeditions of the Rus'	Kievan Rus'	Southern Caspian coastal regions	Unclear
907	Rus'–Byzantine War (907)	Kievan Rus'	Byzantine Empire	Victory
920–1036	Rus'–Pecheneg wars: Siege of Kiev (968)	Kievan Rus'	Pechenegs	Victory: After the Battle of Kiev in 1036, the Pechenegs stopped raiding Rus'
941	Rus'–Byzantine War (941)	Kievan Rus'	Byzantine Empire	Defeat
944/945	Rus'-Byzantine War (944/945)	Kievan Rus'	Byzantine Empire	Victory. The historicity of this conflict is questioned. (Note: Cross & Sherbowitz-Wetzor (1953): 'Practically all modern investigators consider Igor's second expedition unhistorical, e.g., Shakhmatov, Razÿskaniya, p. 395: "Igor's expedition of 944 after the attack of 941 appears clearly as invented to cover up the inglorious event of which the annalist learned from the continuator of Hamartolus." So also Hrushevsky, Istoriya Ukrainy-Rusi, I (Kiev, 1913), p. 442-ff; and Laehr, op. cit., pp. 101-103. Vasiliev, however, Hist., p. 322, accepts the chronicle account. (...)')
945–947	Olga's Revenge on the Drevlians	Kievan Rus': Olga of Kiev	Drevlians	Olga victory. The historicity of this conflict is questioned
965–969	Khazar campaign of Svyatoslav	Kievan Rus'	Khazar Khaganate	Victory: Destruction of the Khazar Khaganate
967/968–971	Sviatoslav's invasion of Bulgaria	Kievan Rus'	Byzantine Empire	Defeat: Byzantine victory
c. 972–980	Feud of the Sviatoslavichi: Casus belli: death of Sviatoslav I of Kiev	Kievan Rus': Kiev (Yaropolk I †); Polotsk (Rogvolod †)	Kievan Rus': Drevlians (Oleg of Drelinia †); Novgorod (Volodimer)	Volodimer victory
c. 981	Polish campaign of Volodimer I	Kievan Rus' (Volodimer I of Kiev)	Duchy of Poland (Mieszko I?)	Victory: Cherven Cities incorporated into Kievan Rus'
985	Volodimer I of Kiev's campaign against Volga Bulgaria	Kievan Rus'	Volga Bulgaria	Military victory, then agreement
987–989	Rebellion of Bardas Phokas the Younger	(Byzantine Empire) Byzantine emperor Basil II; Kievan Rus'	(Byzantine Empire) Bardas Phokas the Younger	Agreement: Rus'–Byzantine marriage alliance; Baptism of Volodimer I of Kiev; Further Christianization of Kievan Rus'
1015–1019	Kievan succession crisis of 1015–1019 (also known as Feud of the Volodimerovichi or Internecine war in Rus'): Bolesław I's intervention in the Kievan succession crisis (June–Sept. 1018)	Kievan Rus' loyal to Svyatopolk I Duchy of Poland (1018); Kingdom of Hungary (1018)	Kievan Rus' loyal to Yaroslav I	Yaroslav victory
1022	Yaroslav the Wise's attack on Brest	Kievan Rus'	Duchy of Poland	Defeat
1024	Battle of Listven	Kievan Rus'; Yaroslav the Wise	Principality of Chernigov; Mstislav of Chernigov	Chernigovian victory
1024	Rus'–Byzantine War (1024)	Kievan Rus'	Byzantine Empire	Defeat
1030	Yaroslav the Wise's campaign against the Chud	Kievan Rus'	Chud	Victory: Estonian tribes start paying tribute to Kievan Rus'
1030–1031	Yaroslav the Wise's campaign for the Cherven Cities	Kievan Rus'	Duchy of Poland	Victory
1031-1034	Kievan Rus' Attacks On Baku (1031-1034)	Kievan Rus'	Shaddadids	Defeat
c. 1038–1047	Miecław's Rebellion	Duchy of Poland; Kievan Rus'	Miecław's State; Duchy of Pomerelia; Yotvingians	Polish victory
1042–1228	Finnish–Novgorodian wars	Kievan Rus' (until 1136): Novgorod Republic	Yem people	Various results, mostly victories: The wars' effect on the Finns' society contributed to the eventual Swedish conquest of western Finland circa 1249
1043	Rus'–Byzantine War (1043)	Kievan Rus'	Byzantine Empire	Defeat
c. 1054–1238	Rus'–Cuman wars: Battle of the Alta River; Battle of Snovsk	Kievan Rus'	Cuman–Kipchak Confederation	Mixed results, mostly Kievan Rus' victories
1065–1069	Rebellion of Vseslav of Polotsk: Sieges of Pskov and Novgorod (1065–1067); Battle on the Nemiga River (1067); Kiev uprising of 1068; Polish intervention, restoration of Iziaslav I of Kiev (1069)	Principality of Kiev; Principality of Chernigov; Principality of Pereyaslavl; Kingdom of Poland (1069)	Principality of Polotsk	Allied victory: Principality of Polotsk is defeated (1067); Vseslav briefly reigned in Kiev (1068–May 1069); Restoration of Iziaslav I of Kiev (May 1069)
1074	Bolesław II the Generous's raid on Kievan Rus'	Kievan Rus'	Kingdom of Poland	Defeat
1076	Bolesław II the Generous's raid on Bohemia	Kingdom of Poland Kievan Rus'	Duchy of Bohemia	Polish–Kievan victory
1076–1077	Kievan succession crisis: Casus belli: death of Sviatoslav Yaroslavich (26 December 1076); Vsevolod besieged Iziaslav in Volyn (1077); Boris Sviatoslavich captured Chernigov, but Vsevolod ousted him (May 1077); Iziaslav recovered Kiev with Polish support (July 1077)	Iziaslav Yaroslavich; Kingdom of Poland Boris Sviatoslavich	Vsevolod Yaroslavich	Compromise: Iziaslav and Vsevolod concluded peace; Iziaslav recovered Kiev; Vsevolod retained Chernigov; Sons of Sviatoslav exiled to Tmutorakan
1078	Chernigov succession crisis: Sviatoslavichi and Cumans initially defeated Vsevolod; Battle of the Nizhatyn Field	Iziaslav Yaroslavich †; Yaropolk Iziaslavich; Vsevolod Yaroslavich; Vladimir Monomakh	Oleg Sviatoslavich; Boris Sviatoslavich; Cumans	Iziaslav–Vsevolod victory
1092	Kievan–Cuman raid on Poland	Kievan Rus'; Cuman–Kipchak Confederation	Kingdom of Poland	Kievan–Cuman victory
1093	Cuman invasion of Kievan Rus': Siege of Torchesk; Battle of the Stuhna River; Battle of the Zhelyan River	Kievan Rus'	Cuman–Kipchak Confederation	Defeat
1093–1097	Chernihiv war of succession (Note: The war broke out due to the death of Vsevolod I Yaroslavych, grand prince of Kyiv, and prince of Chernihiv and Pereyaslavl.)	Izyaslavychi: (Kievan Rus') Svyatopolk II Izyaslavych of Kyiv Monomakhi: Volodimer II of Pereyaslavl; Izyaslav Volodimirovych of Murom †	Svyatoslavychi: Oleh Svyatoslavych of Chernihiv; Davyd Svyatoslavych of Smolensk	Council of Liubech
1096–1116	Monomakh's campaign against the Cumans: Battle of Trubezh (1096); Battle of the Suten river (1103); Battle of the Salnitsa river (1111)	Kievan Rus'	Cuman–Kipchak Confederation	Victory
1097–1100	Internecine war in Rus' 1097–1100	Kievan Rus'; Kingdom of Hungary; Principality of Volhynia (until 1098)	Principality of Peremyshl; Zvenyhorod Principality; Principality of Terebovlya; Principality of Volhynia (from 1098)	Peremyshl victory
1101	Kievan–Cuman raid on Poland	Kievan Rus'; Cuman–Kipchak Confederation	Kingdom of Poland	Kievan–Cuman victory
1120	Kievan–Cuman raid on Poland	Kievan Rus'; Cuman–Kipchak Confederation	Kingdom of Poland	Kievan–Cuman victory
1132–1134	1132–1134 Pereyaslavl succession crisis: Casus belli: Pereyaslavl succession after death of Mstislav I Volodimerovich of Kiev; 1134 resumption: Viacheslav, given Pereyaslavl in 1132 compromise, left for Turov	Yaropolk II Volodimerovich of Kiev; Vsevolod Mstislavich of Pskov; Iziaslav Mstislavich of Volhynia	Yuri Dolgorukiy of Suzdalia Olgovichi of Chernigov	Compromise: Andrey Volodimerovich gained Pereyaslavl (1135); Monomakhovichi split into rival Mstislavichi and Yurievichi
c. 1132–1350	Swedish–Novgorodian Wars	Kievan Rus' (until 1136): Novgorod Republic	Kingdom of Sweden; Kingdom of Norway (from 1319)	Stalemate after Black Death
1139–1142	1139–1142 Kievan succession crisis: Casus belli: death of Yaropolk Volodimerovich II of Kiev	Viacheslav I of Kiev Yurievichi: Yuri Dolgorukiy of Rostov-Suzdal; Rostislav Yuryevich (r. Novgorod 1138–40, 41–42); Novgorod Republic (repeatedly switched sides)	Olgovichi of Chernigov Mstislavichi: Iziaslav Mstislavich of Volhynia; Sviatopolk Mstislavich of Pskov; Novgorod Republic (repeatedly switched sides)	Mixed results: Viacheslav lost Kiev and Pereyaslavl; Yurievichi of Suzdalia lost Novgorod; Olgovichi of Chernigov gained Kiev; Iziaslav Mstislavich of Volhynia gained Pereyaslavl; Sviatopolk Mstislavich of Pskov gained Novgorod
1146–1159	1146–1159 Kievan succession crisis (also known as Internecine war in Rus' 1146–1154): Casus belli: death of Vsevolod Olgovich II of Kiev	Iziaslavichi (senior Mstislavichi): Iziaslav of Volhynia (1146–54); Mstislav of Pereyaslavl; Novgorod Republic (1146–55; 57–58); Olgovichi of Chernigov	Rostislavichi (junior Mstislavichi): Rostislav of Smolensk; Yaroslav of Halych (1158); Novgorod Republic (1158–59); Yuri Dolgorukiy of Suzdalia (1146–57); Cuman allies (1147); Novgorod Republic (1155–57)	Mixed results: Olgovichi of Chernigov lost Kiev; Iziaslavichi of Volhynia lost Pereyaslavl and Novgorod; Rostislavichi of Smolensk gained Kiev and Novgorod; Yurievichi of Suzdalia gained Pereyaslavl
1147	Bolesław IV the Curly's raid on Old Prussians	Bolesław IV the Curly Kievan Rus'	Old Prussians	Bolesław IV the Curly's victory
1167–1169	1167–1169 Kievan succession crisis: Casus belli: death of Rostislav I of Kiev; Iziaslavichi of Volhynia gained control over Kiev and Novgorod (1167–1168); Sack of Kiev (1169) by a Rostislavichi–Yurievichi–Olgovichi coalition; Siege of Novgorod (1170)	Iziaslavichi of Volhynia: Principality of Kiev; Principality of Volhynia; Novgorod Republic	Andrey Bogolyubsky's coalition: Yurievichi of Suzdalia; Olgovichi of Chernigov; Rostislavichi of Smolensk	Coalition victory: Yurievichi gained control over Kiev (1169); Novgorodians & Iziaslavichi defeated coalition (1170); Novgorodians expelled the Iziaslavichi (1170); Yurievichi gained control over Novgorod (1171)
1171–1173	1171–1173 Kievan succession crisis: Casus belli: death of prince Gleb of Kiev; Siege of Vyshgorod (1173)	Kiev and allies: Rostislavichi of Smolensk; Iziaslavichi of Volhynia; Principality of Galicia?; Olgovichi of Chernigov (joined Kiev near end)	Andrey's second coalition: Yurievichi of Suzdalia; Novgorod Republic; various other princes; Olgovichi of Chernigov (defected to Kiev near end)	Kiev & Rostislavichi victory: Andrey's coalition defeated; Yurievichi lost power; Andrey murdered by own boyars (1174)
1174–1177	1174–1177 Suzdalian war of succession: Casus belli: murder of prince Andrey Bogolyubsky of Vladimir-Suzdal	Yurievichi of Suzdalia	Yurievichi of Suzdalia	Vsevolod the Big Nest's victory
1187	Ruthenian raid on Lesser Poland	Principality of Halych	Casimir II the Just	Victory
1188–1189	Béla III's military campaign against Halych	Principality of Halych	Kingdom of Hungary	Defeat
1189	Casimir II the Just's raid on Halych	Kingdom of Hungary Principality of Halych	Casimir II the Just	Defeat
1195–1196	Internecine war in Rus' 1195–1196: Casus belli: death of Sviatoslav III of Kiev	Olgovichi	Monomakhovichi	Indecisive
1203–1234	Campaigns of Rus' princes against the Livonian Brothers of the Sword (see also Livonian Crusade)	Kievan Rus': Vladimir-Suzdal; Principality of Polotsk; Principality of Smolensk; Novgorod Republic; Grand Duchy of Lithuania; Baltic peoples Baltic Finnic peoples	Livonian Brothers of the Sword: Baltic Germans	Defeat: The crusaders captured Baltic lands up to the borders of Kievan Rus' and Lithuania
1205	Roman the Great's raid on Poland: Battle of Zawichost	Principality of Galicia–Volhynia	Leszek I the White	Defeat. Death of Roman the Great.
1206–1210	Internecine war in Rus' 1206–1210	Principality of Chernigov; Principality of Turov; Cumans; Principality of Ryazan (until 1207); Principality of Galicia-Volhynia (since 1206); Principality of Pereyaslavl (since 1206); Vladimir-Suzdal (since 1209)	Principality of Smolensk; Novgorod Republic; Kingdom of Hungary; Vladimir-Suzdal (until 1209); Principality of Ryazan (from 1207); Kingdom of Poland (from 1208); Principality of Volhynia (from 1208)	Mixed results: Olgovichi of Chernigov captured Kiev and Galicia; Yurievichi of Suzdalia captured Ryazan; Rostislavichi of Smolensk captured Novgorod
1207	Leszek I the White's raid on Rus'	Principality of Galicia–Volhynia	Leszek I the White Konrad I of Masovia	Defeat
1212–1216	Vladimir-Suzdal war of succession: Casus belli: death of Vsevolod the Big Nest	Konstantin of Rostov; Mstislav Mstislavich	Yuri II of Vladimir; Yaroslav II of Vladimir	Konstantin victory: Konstantin became Grand Prince of Vladimir
1213–1214, 1219, 1233–1234	Andrew II's military campaigns against Halych	Principality of Galicia–Volhynia	Kingdom of Hungary	Victory. Hungarian retreat.
1214	Leszek I the White's raid on Volodymyr-Volynskyi	Principality of Galicia–Volhynia	Leszek I the White Kingdom of Hungary	Defeat
1218–1221	Polish–Hungarian–Ruthenian War	Principality of Galicia–Volhynia	Leszek I the White Kingdom of Hungary	Victory
1223	Battle of the Kalka River (first Mongol invasion of Kievan Rus')	Principality of Kiev; Principality of Galicia–Volhynia; Principality of Chernigov; Principality of Smolensk Cuman–Kipchak Confederation	Mongol Empire; Brodnici	Crushing defeat: Armies of the Rus' principalities and Cumans mostly destroyed; Mongols plundered some towns and retreated east towards Volga Bulgaria, where they were defeated in the Battle of Samara Bend
1226	Chernihiv internecine war (1226)	Michael Vsevolodovych; Yuri Vsevolodovych; Vasylko Kostiantynovych; Vsevolod Kostiantynovych	Oleh of Kursk	Michael victory
1228–1236/40	Internecine war in Rus' 1228–1240: Casus belli: death of Mstyslav Mstyslavych Udatnyi	Principality of Volhynia; Principality of Kiev; Principality of Smolensk	Principality of Novgorod-Seversk; Cumania	Daniel of Galicia victory
1236–1237: 1236	War between Konrad I of Masovia and Galicia–Volhynia: Battle of Czerwień	Principality of Galicia–Volhynia	Konrad I of Masovia	Victory
1237–1241	Mongol invasion of Kievan Rus' (second) (see also List of battles of the Mongol invasion of Kievan Rus')	Kievan Rus': Kiev; Galicia–Volhynia; Vladimir-Suzdal; Novgorod Republic; Smolensk; Turov and Pinsk; Chernigov; Ryazan; Pereyaslavl	Mongol Empire; Brodnici	Decisive defeat: Kievan Rus' destroyed; Most surviving Rus' principalities became vassals of the Mongol Golden Horde.

== Kingdom of Ruthenia and other Rus' principalities (1240–1500) ==
Following the end of Kievan Rus' in 1240, it split into many Rus' principalities. The Principality, later Kingdom of Galicia–Volhynia (Ruthenia) would control most of the territory of modern Ukraine for a century, after which the Grand Duchy of Lithuania and Crown of the Kingdom of Poland would dominate the region.

Date	Conflict	Combatant 1	Combatant 2	Result
1248–1455	Three raids on Yotvingians	Bolesław V the Chaste Siemowit I of Masovia Kingdom of Galicia–Volhynia	Yotvingians	Bolesław V the Chaste's victory
1252–1254	Kuremsa raid on South Volyn	Kingdom of Galicia–Volhynia	Golden Horde	Victory
1280	War between Leszek II the Black and Kingdom of Galicia–Volhynia: Battle of Goźlice	Kingdom of Galicia–Volhynia	Leszek II the Black	Defeat
1323	Polish-Hungarian raid on Ruthenia	Kingdom of Galicia–Volhynia	Kingdom of Poland Kingdom of Hungary	Defeat
1340–1392	Galicia–Volhynia Wars	Kingdom of Poland local factions Kingdom of Hungary; Duchy of Masovia	Grand Duchy of Lithuania; Golden Horde local factions Duchy of Lodomeria	Expansion of Poland and Lithuania at expense of Rus'
1362/1363	Battle of Blue Waters	Grand Duchy of Lithuania; Principality of Kyiv	Golden Horde	Victory
1389–1392	Lithuanian Civil War (1389–1392)	Teutonic Knights; Samogitia; Rus' principalities	Grand Duchy of Lithuania; Kingdom of Poland	Ostrów Agreement
1409–1411: 1410	Polish–Lithuanian–Teutonic War: Battle of Grunwald	Kingdom of Poland; Grand Duchy of Lithuania; Ruthenia, Masovia, Moldavia, Tatars, Czechs, Bohemia, Moravia, Wallachia, Smolensk	State of the Teutonic Order	Victory
1431–1435	Lithuanian Civil War (1431–1435)	Grand Duchy of Rus' (Polotsk, Vitebsk, Smolensk, Kyiv, Volhynia); Teutonic Knights; Livonian Order; Golden Horde; Principality of Moldavia	Grand Duchy of Lithuania (Samogitian Eldership, Trakai Voivodeship, Vilnius Voivodeship, Podlasie); Kingdom of Poland; Hussites	Defeat

== Cossack Ukraine (1500–1764) ==
This section contains list of wars involving Zaporozhian Cossacks (including Danubian Sich) and Cossack Hetmanate (both of right-bank and left-bank).

=== Uprisings ===
Date	Conflict	Combatant 1	Combatant 2	Result
1591–1593	Kosiński uprising	Zaporozhian Cossacks	Polish–Lithuanian Commonwealth	Defeat
1594–1596	Nalyvaiko Uprising	Zaporozhian Cossacks	Polish–Lithuanian Commonwealth	Defeat
1625	Zhmaylo Uprising	Zaporozhian Cossacks	Polish–Lithuanian Commonwealth	Treaty of Kurukove
1630	Fedorovych Uprising: Battle of Korsun	Zaporozhian Cossacks	Polish–Lithuanian Commonwealth	Renewed agreement
1635	Sulyma Uprising: Capture of Kodak	Zaporozhian Cossacks	Polish–Lithuanian Commonwealth	Defeat, despite Kodak Fortress was destroyed
1637	Pavlyuk Uprising: Battle of Kumeyki	Zaporozhian Cossacks	Polish–Lithuanian Commonwealth	Defeat
1638	Ostryanyn Uprising: Battle of Zhovnyn; Siege of the Starzec River	Zaporozhian Cossacks	Polish–Lithuanian Commonwealth	Defeat
1648–1657: 1651	Khmelnytsky Uprising: Battle of Berestechko (see also Category:Battles of the Khmelnytsky Uprising)	Zaporozhian Cossacks; Crimean Tatars (1649–1654, 1656–1657)	Polish–Lithuanian Commonwealth; Crimean Tatars (1654–1656)	Emerging of Cossack state
1657–1658	Barabash Uprising	Cossack Hetmanate; Crimean Tatars	Zaporozhian Cossacks	Instead of previous uprisings this one was not against Polish–Lithuanian Commonwealth, but against actual hetman of Cossack state Ivan Vyhovsky. The uprising was defeated and Muscovite-Ukrainian war of 1658–1659 began
1659	Bohun Uprising	Cossack Hetmanate; Polish–Lithuanian Commonwealth; Ottoman Empire; Crimean Khanate	Zaporozhian Cossacks; Tsardom of Russia	As well as Barabash Uprising this one was against actual hetman of Cossack state Ivan Vyhovsky. The uprising won, Vyhovsky fled to Poland
1702–1704	Paliy Uprising	Zaporozhian Cossacks; Cossack Hetmanate; Tsardom of Russia	Polish–Lithuanian Commonwealth	Victory of Mazepa’s Cossacks
1734	Haidamak Uprising, 1734	Haidamakas	Polish–Lithuanian Commonwealth	Defeat
1750	Haidamak Uprising, 1750	Haidamakas	Polish–Lithuanian Commonwealth (Russia) Russian Empire	Defeat
1768–1769	Koliivshchyna	Haidamakas	Polish–Lithuanian Commonwealth (Russia) Russian Empire	Defeat

=== Cossack naval campaigns ===
Date	Conflict	Combatant 1	Combatant 2	Result
1492	Raid on Tiahynka	Zaporozhian Cossacks	Ottoman Empire	Victory
1602	Raid on Kiliya	Zaporozhian Cossacks	Ottoman Empire	Victory
1606	Raid on Kiliya and Akkerman	Zaporozhian Cossacks	Ottoman Empire	Victory
1607	Raid on Ochakiv	Zaporozhian Cossacks	Ottoman Empire	Victory
1608	Raid on Perekop	Zaporozhian Cossacks	Ottoman Empire	Victory
1609	Raid on Kiliya, Izmayil and Akkerman	Zaporozhian Cossacks	Ottoman Empire	Victory
1613	Raid on Northern Turkey	Zaporozhian Cossacks	Ottoman Empire	Victory
1614	Raid on Trabzon and Sinop in Northern Turkey	Zaporozhian Cossacks	Ottoman Empire	Victory
1615	Raid on Constantinople	Zaporozhian Cossacks	Ottoman Empire	Victory
1616	Raid on Kafa and Northern Turkey	Zaporozhian Cossacks	Ottoman Empire; Crimean Khanate	Victory
1617	Raid on Constantinople	Zaporozhian Cossacks	Ottoman Empire	Victory
1620	Raid on Constantinople	Zaporozhian Cossacks	Ottoman Empire	Victory
1624	Raids on Istanbul	Zaporozhian Cossacks	Ottoman Empire	Victory
1625	Battle of Karaharman	Zaporozhian Cossacks	Ottoman Empire	Defeat
1629	Raid on Istanbul	Zaporozhian Cossacks	Ottoman Empire	Victory
1630	Battle of Ochakov	Zaporozhian Cossacks	Ottoman Empire	Defeat

=== Other conflicts ===
Date	Conflict	Combatant 1	Combatant 2	Result
1515-XVII century	Cossack raids into Russia	Zaporozhian Cossacks; Polish–Lithuanian Commonwealth	Tsardom of Russia	Mixed results: Russian lands devastated.
1521	Crimean Invasion of Russia	Crimean Khanate; Zaporozhian Cossacks; Ottoman Empire; Circassia	Principality of Moscow	Victory
1558–1583	Livonian War	Livonian Confederation; Polish–Lithuanian Commonwealth (before 1569 the Polish–Lithuanian union); Denmark–Norway; Sweden; Zaporozhian Cossacks; Principality of Transylvania (after 1577)	(Tsardom of Russia) Tsardom of Russia; Qasim Khanate; Kingdom of Livonia	Victory
1568–1570	Russo-Turkish War	Tsardom of Russia; Don Cossacks; Zaporozhian Cossacks Kabardia (East Circassia)	Ottoman Empire; Crimean Khanate; Nogai Horde; Shamkhalate of Tarki	Victory
1571–1572	Russo–Crimean War: Battle of Molodi	Tsardom of Russia; Don Cossacks Zaporozhian Cossacks	Crimean Khanate; Ottoman Empire	Victory
1575	Crimean Campaign	Zaporozhian Cossacks; Don Cossacks	Crimean Khanate; Nogai Horde	Victory
1577	Ivan Pidkova's Moldavian campaign	Zaporozhian Cossacks	Moldavia; Ottoman Empire	Pidkova became ruler of Moldavia
1591–1606	Long War	Holy Roman Empire: Crown of Bohemia; Saxony; Austria; Kingdom of Hungary; Kingdom of Croatia; Transylvania; Wallachia; Moldavia; Zaporozhian Host; Spain; Serbian hajduks Papal States; Venice; Tuscany; Persia; Knights of St. Stephen; Duchy of Ferrara; Duchy of Mantua; Duchy of Savoy	Ottoman Empire; Crimean Khanate; Nogai Horde	Peace of Zsitvatorok
1620–1621: 1621	Polish–Ottoman War: Battle of Khotyn	Polish–Lithuanian Commonwealth; Zaporozhian Cossacks	Ottoman Empire	Indecisive
1637–1642	Siege of Azov (1637–1642)	Don Cossacks; Zaporozhian Cossacks	Ottoman Empire; Crimean Khanate; Nogai Horde	Military victory
1654–1679	Sirko's Campaigns: Battle of Igren; Sirko's Eastern Campaign; Battle of Sich; Crimean Campaign; Second Battle of Sich	Zaporozhian Cossacks; Don Cossacks; Kalmyk Khanate	Ottoman Empire; Crimean Khanate; Nogai Horde	Victory
1654–67	Russo-Polish War	Tsardom of Russia; Zaporozhian Cossacks	Polish–Lithuanian Commonwealth; Crimean Khanate; Zaporozhian Cossacks	Treaty of Andrusovo, division of Cossack Hetmanate between Poland and Russia
1658–1659: 1659	Russo-Ukrainian / Moscovian-Cossack war: Battle of Konotop	Cossack Hetmanate; Crimean Khanate	Tsardom of Russia	Pereyaslav Articles
1650, 1652, 1653	Bohdan Khmelnytsky's Moldavian campaign	Cossack Hetmanate; Crimean Khanate	Principality of Moldavia; Principality of Wallachia; Principality of Transylvania; Polish–Lithuanian Commonwealth	Status quo
1655–1660: 1655–1660	Second Northern War: Deluge	(Sweden) Swedish Empire; Brandenburg-Prussia (1656–1657); Principality of Transylvania; Cossack Hetmanate (1657); Grand Duchy of Lithuania; Wallachia; Moldavia	Poland–Lithuania; Denmark–Norway; Habsburg Monarchy; Russia (1656–1658); Crimean Khanate; Brandenburg-Prussia (1655–1656, 1657–1660); Dutch Republic	Indecisive for Ukraine
1666–1671	Polish–Cossack–Tatar War	Cossack Hetmanate (Doroshenko's faction); Crimean Khanate	Polish–Lithuanian Commonwealth; Cossack Hetmanate (Khanenko's faction); Sirko's Cossacks	Doroshenko's defeat
1672–1676: 1673	Polish–Ottoman War: Battle of Khotyn	Ottoman Empire; Crimean Khanate; Principality of Moldavia; Cossack Hetmanate (Doroshenko's faction)	Polish–Lithuanian Commonwealth; Principality of Wallachia (in 1673)	Ottoman Empire won control over parts of Ukraine
1676–1681	Russo-Turkish War	Tsardom of Russia: Zaporozhian Cossacks (Samoylovych)	Ottoman Empire: Crimean Khanate; Zaporozhian Cossacks (Doroshenko)	Treaty of Bakhchisarai
1683–1699: 1683; 1683	Polish–Ottoman War: Battle of Vienna; Stefan Kunicki's Moldavian and Right-bank campaign	Polish–Lithuanian Commonwealth: Allied Holy League forces; Left-bank Zaporozhian Cossacks; Right-bank Zaporozhian Cossacks	Ottoman Empire: Right-bank Zaporozhian Cossacks (factions, until 1685)	Decisive Holy League victory.
1686–1700	Russo-Turkish War	Tsardom of Russia; Habsburg Empire; Polish–Lithuanian Commonwealth; Cossack Hetmanate	Ottoman Empire; Crimean Khanate	Victory
1700–1721: 1709	Great Northern War: Battle of Poltava	(Sweden) Swedish Empire (1700–1721); Holstein–Gottorp (1700–1719); Polish–Lithuanian Commonwealth (1704–1709); Ottoman Empire (1710–1714): Crimean Khanate; Moldavia; Wallachia; Cossack Hetmanate (1708–1709) (Kingdom of Great Britain) Great Britain (1719–1721)	Tsardom of Russia (1700–1721); Electorate of Saxony (1700–1706, 1709–1719); Polish–Lithuanian Commonwealth (1701–1704, 1704–1709, 1709–1719); Denmark–Norway (1700, 1709–1720); Cossack Hetmanate (1700–1708, 1709–1721); Kingdom of Prussia (1715–1720) (Province of Hanover) Electorate of Hanover (1715–1719) (Kingdom of Great Britain) Great Britain (1717–1719); Moldavia (1711)	Anti-Swedish coalition victory
1710–1713	Russo-Turkish War (1710-1713); Crimean campaign (1711)	Ottoman Empire; Crimean Khanate; Wallachia; (Sweden) Swedish Empire; Cossack Hetmanate (Orlyk's faction); Zaporizhian Sich	(Russian Empire) Tsardom of Russia; Cossack Hetmanate (Skoropadsky's faction); Moldavia	Ottoman victory (Treaty of Pruth)
1735–1739	Austro-Russian–Turkish War	Russian Empire: Cossack Hetmanate; Habsburg Empire	Ottoman Empire: Crimean Khanate	Treaty of Niš, Treaty of Belgrade
1768–1774	Russo-Turkish War	Russian Empire: Zaporozhian Host; Greek insurgents Kingdom of Kartli-Kakheti; Kingdom of Imereti	Ottoman Empire: Crimean Khanate	Treaty of Küçük Kaynarca
1775	The Fall of Zaporizhian Sich	Zaporozhian Cossacks	Russian Empire	Defeat

== War of independence (1917–1921) ==
This section contains list of wars involving different Ukrainian states de facto existed between 1917 and 1922 (Ukrainian People's Republic, Ukrainian State, Western Ukrainian People's Republic, Hutsul Republic, Komancza Republic) and other Ukrainian anti-bolshevik state formations (Kuban People's Republic, Makhnovshchina, Ukrainian Republic of the Far East).

Date	Conflict	Combatant 1	Combatant 2	Result
1917–1921: 1918; 1918	Ukrainian War of Independence – Ukrainian–Soviet War: Battle of Kiev (1918); Battle of Kruty	Ukrainian People's Republic; Ukrainian Galician Army; Germany (until 1918)	Russian SFSR; Ukrainian SSR	Bolshevik victory
7–8 January 1919	Hutsul uprising	Hutsul Republic	Hungary	Victory
1918–1919: 1918; 1918; 1919	Ukrainian War of Independence – Polish–Ukrainian War: Battle of Lemberg; Battle of Przemyśl; Chortkiv offensive	West Ukrainian People's Republic; Ukrainian People's Republic; Hutsul Republic; Komancza Republic	Poland; Romania; Hungary; Czechoslovakia	Polish victory: Treaty of Warsaw (1920): Second Polish Republic recognises the independence of Ukrainian People's Republic, but it becomes a de facto Polish protectorate; All other Ukrainian-led rebel republics are annexed by Poland, Czechoslovakia, Hungary or Romania
1919-1920	Ukrainian-White Guard conflict	Ukrainian People's Republic	White movement	Victory: White Guard occupies most of Ukraine as of October 1919; White Guard retreats to Crimea after the First Winter Campaign
1919–1921	Polish–Soviet War (see also List of battles of the Polish–Soviet War)	Second Polish Republic; Ukrainian People's Republic	Russian SFSR; Ukrainian SSR; Byelorussian SSR; Polrewkom	Polish victory: Treaty of Riga (1921): Ukrainian People's Republic is defeated; most of Ukraine's territory becomes part of the Ukrainian SSR, which joins the Soviet Union in 1922; Second Polish Republic achieves independence and annexes parts of western Ukraine
1917–1920	Russian Civil War – Southern Front	Ukrainian People's Republic; Georgia; Armenia; Azerbaijan; Insurgent Army (Note: Insurgent Army was an ally both of Ukrainian states and Soviets in different times.)	Russian SFSR (Note: White Army and Red Army were not allies but both of them were opponents of Ukrainian movement.); Ukrainian SSR; South Russia; Insurgent Army	Bolshevik victory
1920-1921	Soviet-Makhnovist conflict	Makhnovshchina	Russian SFSR; Ukrainian SSR	Soviet victory: Makhnovists Defeated: Anarchists destroyed & retreat to Romania; Fail to create new Ukrainian State
1918–1923	Russian Civil War – Eastern Front	Green Ukraine; Buryat-Mongolia	Transbaikal Republic; Russian SFSR	Bolshevik victory

== Interwar period (1922–1938) ==
In 1922, the Ukrainian Soviet Socialist Republic was incorporated into the Soviet Union. No major armed conflicts on Soviet Ukrainian territory would take place until 1939, although Ukrainian 'national units' would be used as national military formations of the Red Army until 1934 and, as such, fight in Soviet armed conflicts elsewhere in the world. Also, as a response to the collectivization, various peasant rebellions took place in 1929-1933 across the Soviet Union, including Ukraine, which were suppressed by the Soviet authorities. The western areas of Ukraine (including most of the former West Ukrainian People's Republic's claimed territories) that were annexed by the Second Polish Republic similarly saw no fighting in the interwar period until 1939, although some small and brief armed conflicts did occur elsewhere in Poland in this period.

== World War II (1939–1945) ==
This section contains only military activity of non-Soviet and non-Nazi Ukrainian organizations.

Date	Conflict	Combatant 1	Combatant 2	Result
1939	Hungarian invasion of Carpatho-Ukraine	Carpatho-Ukraine	Hungary	Defeat
1939–1947	World War II – Polish-Ukrainian conflict	Ukrainian Insurgent Army; Ukrainian People's Revolutionary Army	Home Army; People's Army; Polish People's Republic	Soviet occupation of Western Ukraine: Home Army units in Galicia and Volhynia were dissolved under Soviet pressure; Polish–Soviet border agreement; Population exchange between Poland and Soviet Ukraine; Vistula Operation and subsequent defeat of UPA in Polish People's Republic; UPA and the Polish undergroung (Cursed soldiers) continued anti-communist resistance in post-war Ukraine and Poland respectively
1941–1944	World War II – Non-Soviet anti-Nazi activity: Anti-Partisan Operations in Volyn-Polissia	Ukrainian Insurgent Army; Ukrainian People's Revolutionary Army	Germany; Hungary; Romania; Slovakia	Victory
1941–1960	World War II – Anti-Soviet activity	Ukrainian Insurgent Army; Ukrainian People's Revolutionary Army	Soviet Union	Cessation of activity

== 21st century ==
Date	Conflict	Combatant 1	Combatant 2	Result
2014–present	Russo-Ukrainian War: Russian annexation of Crimea (Timeline); War in Donbas (Timeline); Kerch Strait incident; 2022–present ( Timeline; 2022 full-scale invasion )	Ukraine Supplied by: For countries providing aid to Ukraine since 2022, see military aid to Ukraine	Russia; Donetsk PR (Note: The Donetsk People's Republic and the Luhansk People's Republic were Russian puppet states that declared their independence from Ukraine in May 2014. In 2022, they received international recognition from each other, Russia, Syria and North Korea, and some other partially recognised states. On 30 September 2022, Russia declared that it had formally annexed both entities. They continue to exist as republics of Russia.); Luhansk PR; North Korea; Belarus (Note: In 2022, Belarus allowed Russia to use its territory to launch the invasion and to launch missiles into Ukraine.); Supplied by: For details, see Russian military suppliers	Ongoing: Russian annexation of Crimea and parts of four southeast Ukrainian oblasts in 2014 and 2022, respectively; Russian occupation of more than 18% of Ukrainian territory as of March 2024; Ukrainian occupation of parts of Russia's Kursk Oblast since 2024

== Partial involvement (intelligence, training) ==
Date	Conflict	Result
2023-2024 (involvement)	Sudanese civil war (2023–present)	Withdrawal of direct support by Ukraine due to Russian support for the Sudanese Government
2024	2024 Syrian opposition offensives	Opposition victory; fall of the Assad Regime
2024 (beginning of involvement) -present	Mali War	Ongoing: 2026 Mali offensives
2026-present	2026 Iran war	Ongoing

== Peacekeeping missions ==
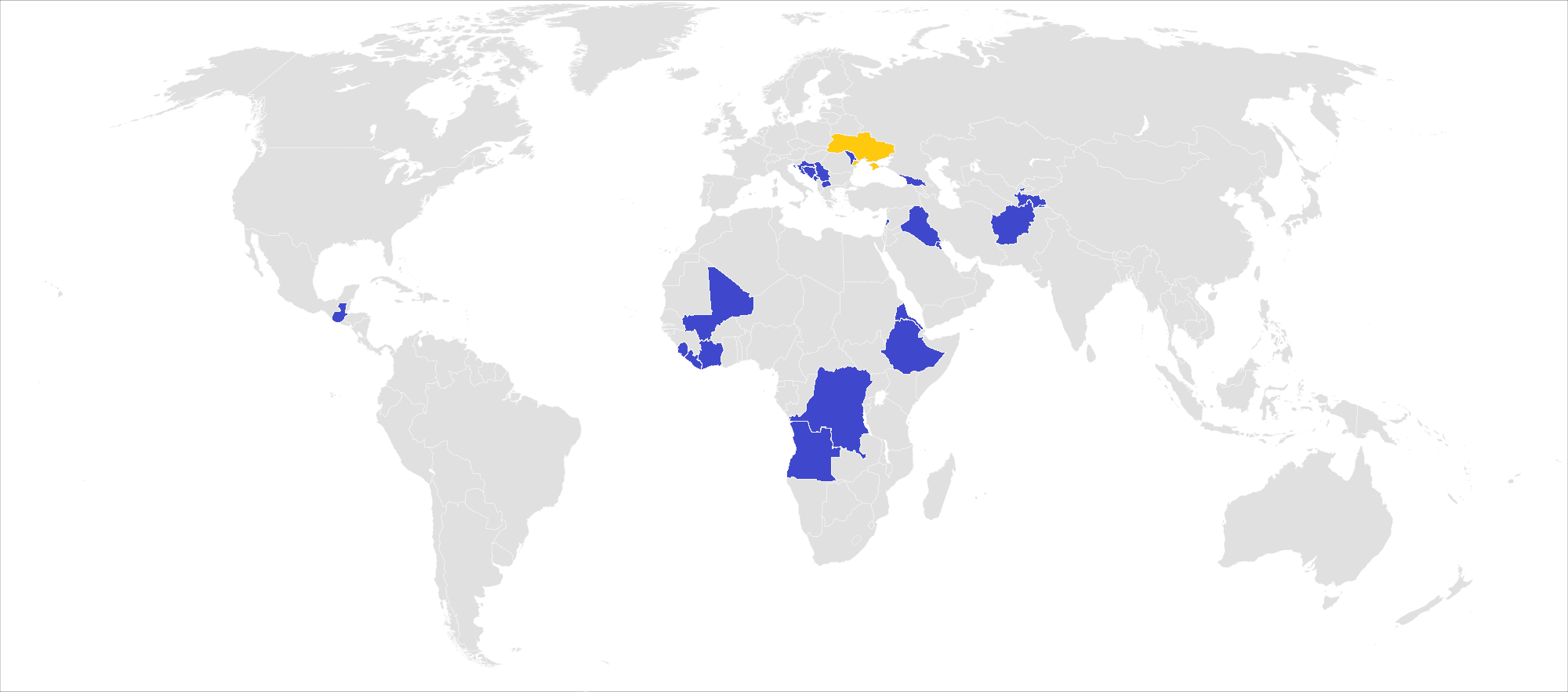
Peacekeeping missions of Ukraine since 1991

=== Completed ===
Mission	Start-date	End-date	Location	Troops (regular)
UNPROFOR	1992	1995	Yugoslavia	1,303
UNMOT	1994	2000	Tajikistan	21
UNMIBH	1995	1999	Bosnia and Herzegovina	400
UNPREDEP	1995	1999	North Macedonia	1
UNTAES	1996	1998	Croatia (Slavonija)	511
MONUA	1996	1999	Angola	216
UNMOP	1996	2002	Croatia; Yugoslavia (Prevlaka)	2
MINUGUA	1997	1997	Guatemala	8
Ukraine Diplomatic Support in Transnistria	1990	1992	Transnistria	0
UNOMIG	1999	2005	Georgia	530
UNIFIL	2000	2006	Lebanon	650
ISAF	2000	2001	Afghanistan	1
UNAMSIL	2001	2005	Sierra Leone	530
UNIKOM	2003	2003	Kuwait	448
UNMIL	2003	2018	Liberia	275
UNMEE	2004	2008	Ethiopia; Eritrea	7
MNF-I (Note: For further information, see Ukrainian involvement in the Iraq War.)	2005	2008	Iraq	1,660
UNOMIG	2008	2009	Georgia	37
UNOCI	2011	2017	Côte d'Ivoire	1,303

=== Withdrawn ===
Mission	Start-date	End-date	Location	Troops (regular)
Kosovo Force	1999	2022 (August 3)	Kosovo	40
MONUSCO	2000	2022 (September 18)	Democratic Republic of the Congo	250
UNMISS	2012	2022 (April)	South Sudan	28
MINUSMA	2019	2022 (March)	Mali	20

== See also ==
- List of conflicts in Europe
- List of invasions and occupations of Ukraine
- List of wars between Russia and Ukraine
- List of wars involving the Soviet Union

== Sources ==
- Cross, Samuel Hazzard; Sherbowitz-Wetzor, Olgerd P. (1953) [1930]. The Russian Primary Chronicle, Laurentian Text. Translated and edited by Samuel Hazzard Cross and Olgerd P. Sherbowitz-Wetzor (PDF). Cambridge, Massachusetts: The Mediaeval Academy of America. p. 325.
- Katchanovski, Ivan; Kohut, Zenon E.; Nesebio, Bohdan Y.; Yurkevich, Myroslav (2013). Historical Dictionary of Ukraine. Lanham, Maryland; Toronto; Plymouth: Scarecrow Press. p. 992. ISBN 9780810878471. Archived from the original on 23 April 2023.
- Kohn, George Childs (2013). Dictionary of Wars. Revised Edition. Londen/New York: Routledge. ISBN 9781135954949.
- Крип'якевич І., Гнатевич Б. та ін. Історія українського війська., Львів, 1992., pp. 193–194.
- Logan, F. Donald (2005). The Vikings in History. New York: Routledge (Taylor & Francis). p. 205. ISBN 9780415327565. Archived from the original on 23 April 2023. (third edition)
- Martin, Janet (1995). Medieval Russia, 980–1584. Cambridge: Cambridge University Press. p. 450. ISBN 9780521368322.
- Martin, Janet (2007). Medieval Russia: 980–1584 (E-book) (Second ed.). Cambridge: Cambridge University Press. ISBN 978-0-511-36800-4.
- Martin, Janet (2009b). "From Kiev to Muscovy: The Beginnings to 1450". In Freeze, Gregory (ed.). Russia: A History. Oxford: Oxford University Press. pp. 1–30. ISBN 978-0-19-150121-0. Archived from the original on 27 January 2023. (third edition)
- Pelenski, Jaroslaw (1988). "The Contest for the "Kievan Succession" (1155–1175): The Religious-Ecclesiastical Dimension". Harvard Ukrainian Studies. 12/13: 761–780. JSTOR 41036344.
- Сокульський А.Л. Флот Запорозької Січі в XVI-XVIII ст.: структурна організація, технологія та військове мистецтво. Дис. к.і.н., К., 1999. pp. 113–114.
- Гумилев, Лев (2023). От Руси к России. Moscow: Москва. ISBN 978-5-17-153845-3.
