= Battle of Karaharman (1625) =

Ottoman-Cossack naval battle

- Part of the Cossack raids and Cossack naval campaigns
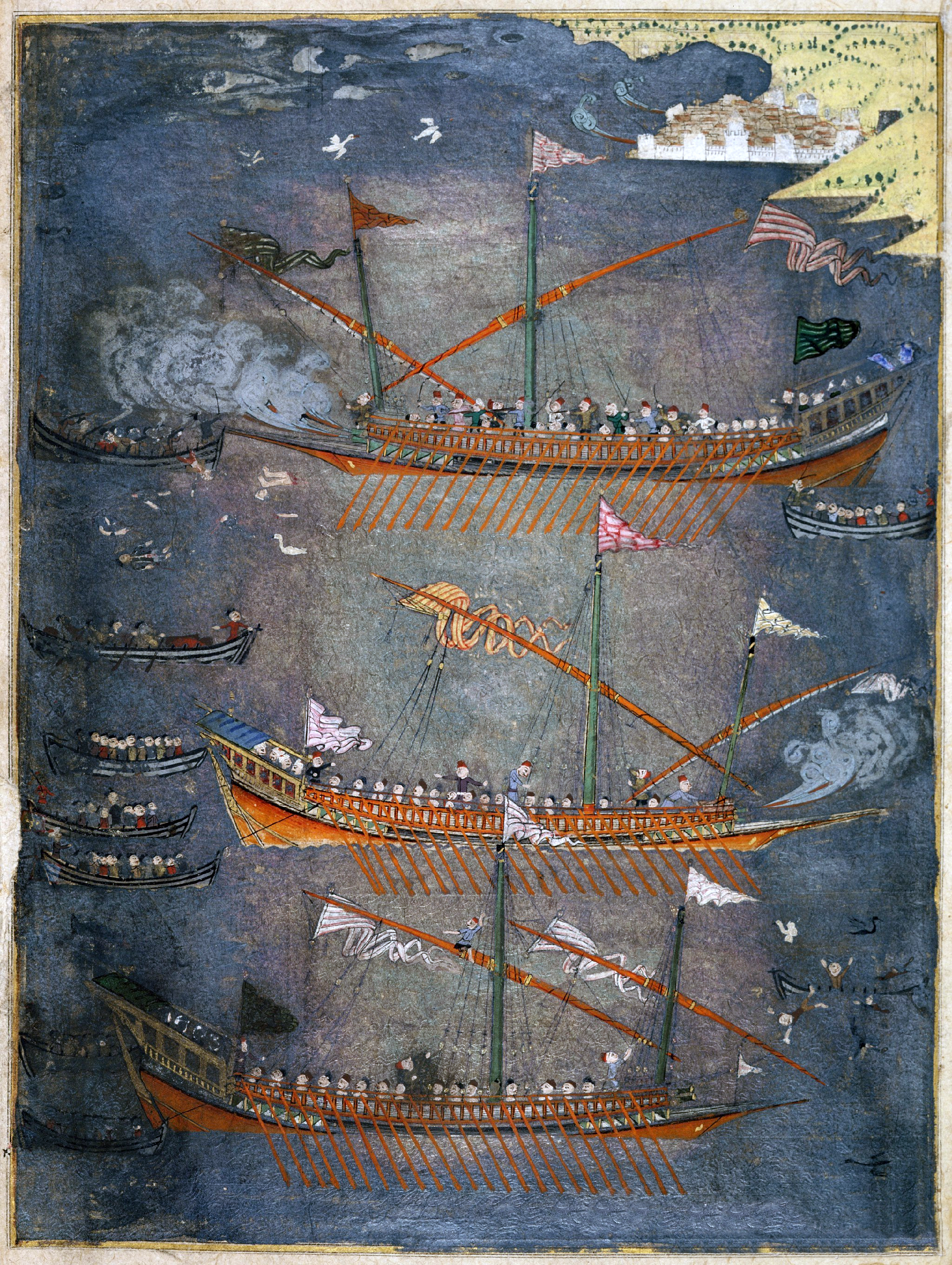
Date	27 July 1625
Location	Karaharman coast, Black Sea
Result	Ottoman victory

Belligerents
Zaporozhian Cossacks; Don Cossacks	Ottoman Empire

Commanders and leaders
Kindrat Burliy	(Ottoman Empire) Topal Recep Pasha (Ottoman Empire) Piyale-Uzun (Ottoman Empire) Kapudan Abdi (Ottoman Empire) Janalem-Zade-Aga

Strength
12,000 to 15,000 men 300 chaikas	43 galleys

Casualties and losses
780 killed 300 captured 270 chaikas	200–300 killed (Note: Per the report from F. de Sezi)

The Battle of Karaharman (Note: Turkish: Karaharman Muharebesi Ukrainian: Битва при Карахармані) was a major naval battle that took place on 27 July 1625 between the Zaporozhian Cossacks and the Ottoman fleet, it is considered to be one of the biggest defeats of the Cossack fleet in the course of their naval campaigns.

== Prelude ==
In 1624, Cossacks raided Istanbul twice. In 1625, Zaporozhian and Don Cossacks combined their forces for a joint naval campaign, consisting of 15,000 Cossacks and 300 boats. Led by Kindrat Burliy, they headed in the direction of Trebizond and Sinop. On 19-23 May, Cossack managed to capture Trebizond and plunder it, with exception of its citadel which put up a stiff resistance. Later, Cossacks went on a raid towards Sinop. Cossacks also wanted to plunder Istanbul. However, it was blocked by the Ottoman fleet, unlike in previous raids.

== Battle ==
On 27 July, Cossacks set off on their raid. They encountered 43 Ottoman galleys blocking their path, which were guarding the coast as they were aware of Cossacks returning soon. Out of 43 Ottoman galleys, 21-22 took part in the fighting, which were attacked by the Cossacks. Cossacks attacked boldly, with 200 Cossacks breaking into one of the galleys and causing bloodshed there, intending to liberate Cossack captives held in the galley. Although the course of the battle is debatable, it's clear that the battle initially was heading in Cossack favour. According to Viktor Mandziak, most of the Ottoman galleys were initially captured by the Cossacks, including the ships of Piyale-Uzun, Kapudan Abdi and Janalem-Zade-Aga. However, the situation was changed by the wind, which gave Ottomans a chance to repel Cossacks. Ottomans took this opportunity, winning the battle.

== Aftermath ==
According to the Ottoman admiral, Cossack fleet was completely defeated. However, contradictory skeptical accounts of only 300 Cossack captives and 17 chaikas captured were reported by contemporaries. In addition, Cossacks defeated Ottoman fleet salling in the Dnieper half a month later. The same year, Cossacks plundered Ochakov and Kiliya. At the same time, Cossacks remained dissatisfied with their lost opportunity to plunder and wanted a bigger revenge. In late October, 30,000 Cossacks were to attack Crimea. However, king Sigismund III didn't want to allow Cossacks to do this. In addition, Polish king remembered Cossack atrocities previously committed in Kiev Voivodeship. As a result, king sent Koniecpolski's army to restrain Cossacks, leading to Zhmaylo uprising.
