= Cossack raid on Istanbul (1615) =

Raid on the capital of the Ottoman Empire

- Part of the Cossack raids and Cossack naval campaigns
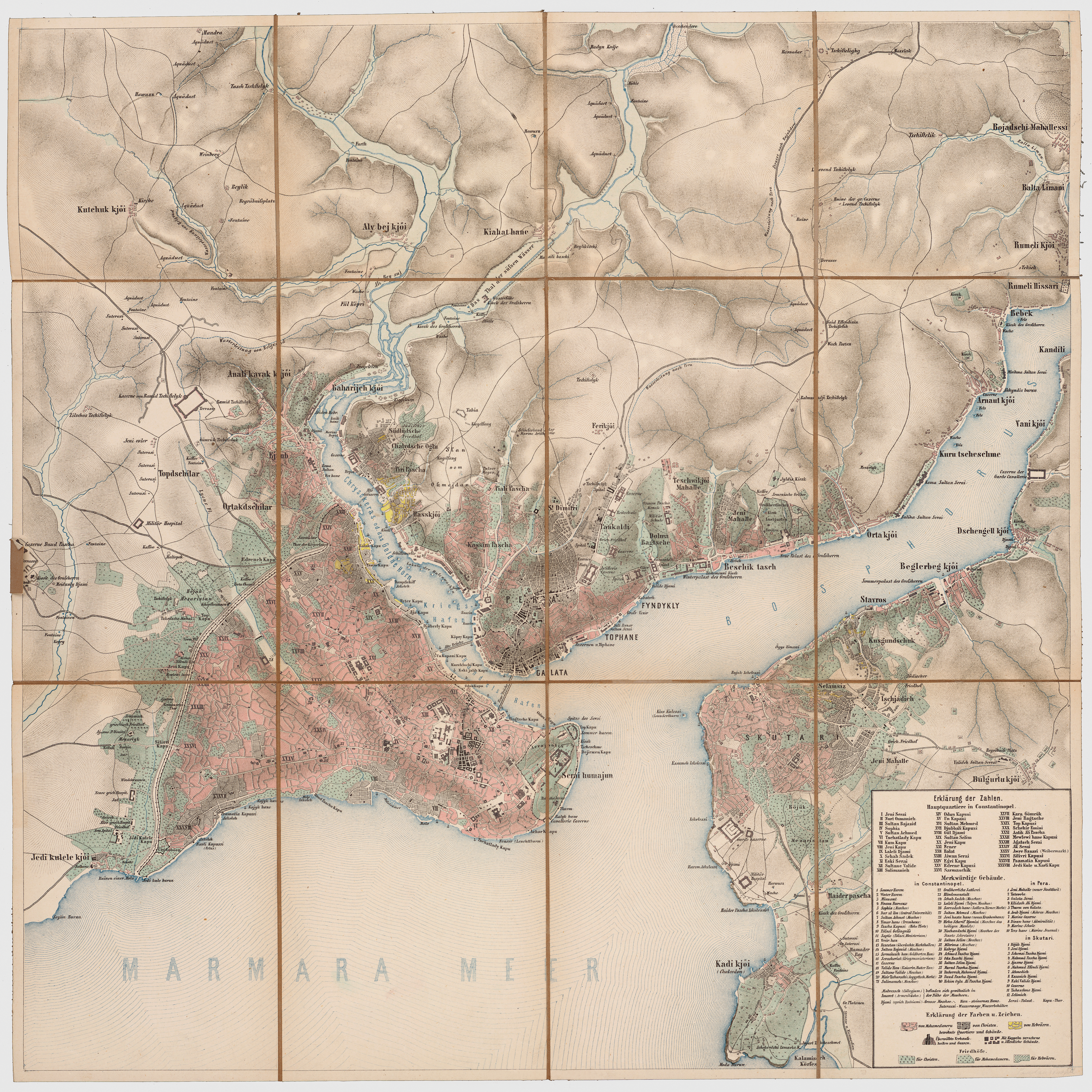
- Map of Istanbul which was attacked and burned by the Cossacks during the campaign
Date	June 1615
Location	Istanbul, Scutari District, Marmara Region, Ottoman Empire
Result	Cossack victory

Belligerents
Zaporozhian Cossacks	Ottoman Empire

Commanders and leaders
Petro Konashevych-Sahaidachnyi	(Ottoman Empire) Ahmed I (Ottoman Empire) Hasan Pasha (POW) (Ottoman Empire) Ali-Pasha (POW)

Strength
~4,000; 80+ boats	Unknown

Casualties and losses
Unknown	Heavy: Enormous damage to Ottoman fleet

The Cossack raid on Istanbul (Note: Turkish: İstanbul'a Kazak Baskını Ukrainian: Козацький напад на Стамбул) led by Petro Konashevych-Sahaidachnyi on the capital of the Ottoman Empire was a part of the Cossack Naval Campaigns. The Cossacks on their Chaykas attacked the harbor of the city and burned it, capturing the Admiral Hasan Pasha during the unsuccessful counterattack by the defenders. During the naval campaign, several Ottoman personnel were killed, wounded and captured during the defense and counterattack. After the raid the attackers successfully returned back with looted property.

== Background ==
The Cossack communities emerged in the fourteenth century in the Ukrainian steppe by the Dnieper River. The Cossacks developed highly militaristic communities largely responsible for raids on Tatars. Neighboring states, including the Kingdom of Poland, employed them in times of conflict. In the 1500s, the Cossacks frequently attacked the Crimean Tatars and Ottomans with the intention of plundering treasure and liberating Christian slaves. By the sixteenth and seventeenth centuries, the Cossacks began raiding communities in the Black Sea, including the cities of Varna, Perekop, Bilhorod, Izmail, and Trebizond.

== Raid ==
In May 1615, a group of Cossacks embarked to Turkey on eighty small boats, each one carrying approximately 50 men. By mid-June they crossed the Black Sea and landed in the vicinity of Constantinople. The Cossacks captured and set on fire the Istanbul neighborhood of Scutari (now Üsküdar), as well as the ports of Mizevna and Archioca. After raiding and looting the city, the Cossacks returned to Ukraine.

Sultan Ahmed I, noticing smoke from his windows caused by the fire, sent a fleet of galleys in pursuit. The Ottomans caught up with the Cossacks at the mouth of the Danube. However the Cossacks defeated them and the admiral of the fleet was captured and taken to Ukraine.

== Aftermath ==
The Cossacks burnt Ottoman fleet in Istanbul. This raid raised the international prestige of the Zaporozhian Cossacks, also demonstrating that Cossacks were more efficient at fighting the Ottoman Empire than such European powers as the Republic of Venice and Habsburg monarchy. In addition, this raid strengthened the morale of the Cossacks, who were now successfully attacking strongholds which neither the Holy Roman Empire nor the Polish–Lithuanian Commonwealth dared to attack. European diplomats brought news of the Cossack raid to the West. French historian Michel Baudier wrote: "The mere mention of Cossacks brings dread and terror to Constantinople".

As retribution, Ahmed I sent a fleet under the command of Admiral Ali-Pasha the following year with the intention of raiding the Cossacks at Dnieper. They were met by chaikas under the command of Konashevich-Sagaidachny. The Cossacks again defeated the Ottomans, seizing a dozen galleys and nearly a hundred boats. Ali-Pasha narrowly escaped.

The Cossacks subsequently blockaded the Crimean Peninsula and attacked and conquered Kaffa, which was at the time one of the most important Turkish ports on the Black Sea and a center of the Ottoman slave trade.

== See also ==
- Cossack raid on Istanbul (1620)
- Cossack raids on Istanbul (1624)
- Cossack raid on Istanbul (1629)
- Cossack raid on Istanbul (1652)

== Sources ==
1. Крип'якевич І., Гнатевич Б. та ін. Історія українського війська. – Львів, 1992. – С.193-194
2. Davies, Brian (2014). Warfare, State and Society on the Black Sea Steppe, 1500–1700. Routledge; 978-1-134-55283-2. pp. 24-25
