= Helix BioPharma Corp. =

Canadian pharmaceutical company

- Type: Public
- Industry: Pharmaceutical
- Founded: 1995
- Founder: Jerome F. McElroy
- Headquarters: Toronto, Canada
- Area served: Worldwide
- Key people: Jacek Antas (CEO),
- Website: www.helixbiopharma.com

Helix BioPharma Corp. is a Canadian biopharmaceutical company, that was founded in 1995, with its headquarters in Toronto, Canada. Helix specializes in researching and developing novel drugs to tackle hard-to-treat cancers, including solid tumors and hematological malignancies.

Helix BioPharma Corp. is publicly traded on the Toronto Stock Exchange (TSX) under the ticker symbol HBP. The company is also listed on the OTC Pink Market in the United States under the symbol HBPCD, and on the Frankfurt Stock Exchange (FWB) under the ticker HBP0.

== History ==
Helix BioPharma Corp. originates from Intercon Pharma Inc., founded in 1988. In 1995, Intercon Pharma Inc. merged with International Helix Biotechnologies Inc., leading to the establishment of Helix BioPharma Corp. on July 31, 1995. The newly formed company was subsequently listed on the Toronto Stock Exchange (TSX).

Since its formation, Helix BioPharma has focused on the development of therapeutic treatments, primarily in oncology, with emphasis on immuno-oncology and targeted cancer therapy. During its early years, the company investigated a range of therapeutic areas, including a gastrointestinal product, before directing its principal efforts toward oncology. Helix has been awarded multiple United States patents for its proprietary technologies, which has advanced its development pipeline.

== Operations ==
Helix BioPharma operates within the oncology sector of the biopharmaceutical industry and is engaged in the discovery and early-stage clinical development of innovative programs already supported by clinical efficacy signals and established scientific rationale, with the aim of accelerating progress in the treatment of prevalent and treatment-resistant cancers.

== Research and development ==
Helix BioPharma's research and development initiatives focus on a proprietary platform of bio-conjugates, specifically targeting tumor types that overexpress carcinoembryonic antigen-related cell adhesion molecule 6 (CEACAM6).

By purchasing two oncology candidates from the Laevoroc Group in 2025—LEUMUNATM and GEMCEDATM—it increased the size of its pipeline.

Helix has also entered collaborations to develop cell- and antibody-based therapies, including a 2018 agreement with ProMab Biotechnologies to explore CAR-T therapies for different hematological malignancies. These activities along with research partnerships with institutions such as the H. Lee Moffitt Cancer Center & Research Institute, form part of the company’s R&D portfolio and were undertaken amid operational disruptions associated with the COVID-19 pandemic and broader supply-chain effects following the conflict in Ukraine.

=== L-DOS47 ===
The company developed L-DOS47 which is a clinical-stage antibody-enzyme conjugate designed to target CEACAM6, a protein overexpressed in non-small cell lung cancer (NSCLC). By neutralizing the acidic tumor microenvironment, it may enhance the effectiveness of other cancer therapies.
