= Kiev Uprising =

Kiev or Kyiv Uprising may refer to several uprising that took place in Kyiv:

- Kiev uprising of 1068
- Kiev Arsenal January Uprising
- Kiev Bolshevik Uprising
