= Battle of Ochakov (1630) =

Battle in Ukraine

- Part of the Cossack raids and Cossack naval campaigns
| Date | Spring of 1630 |
| Location | Near Ochakov, Ottoman Empire |
| Result | Ottoman victory |

Belligerents
| Ottoman Empire | Zaporozhian Cossacks |

Commanders and leaders
| (Ottoman Empire) Kapudan Pasha | Taras Fedorovych |

Strength
| Unknown | Unknown |

Casualties and losses
| Unknown | 800 captured 55 boats captured |

The Battle of Ochakov (Note: Turkish: Özi Muharebesi Ukrainian: Битва під Очаковом) was a battle that took place in 1630 during a Cossack expedition to the Black Sea led by Taras Fedorovych.

== Battle ==
During the naval campaign of the Zaporozhian Cossacks in the Black Sea, the Turkish fleet, sent under the command of the Kapudan Pasha, pursued the Cossack ships, caught up with them, and defeated them near Ochakiv, capturing 55 chaikas and taking 800 prisoners.

== Aftermath ==
The captured Cossacks and their boats were sent to Istanbul as a trophy.
