= Cossack raid on Istanbul (1652) =

- Part of the Cossack raids
Date	29 May 1652
Location	Istanbul, Marmara Region, Ottoman Empire
Result	Cossack victory

Belligerents
Don Cossacks	Ottoman Empire

Commanders and leaders
Ivan Bogatyi	(Ottoman Empire) Mehmed IV (Ottoman Empire) Melek Ahmed Pasha

Strength
1,000; 15 boats	10 boats

Casualties and losses
Light	Many killed 150 captured

The Cossack raid on Istanbul (Russian: Казацкий рейд на Стамбул, Ukrainian: Козацький рейд на Стамбул, Turkish: İstanbul'a Kazak baskını; 1652) was conducted by the Don Cossacks of Ataman Ivan Bogatyi against the capital of Ottoman Empire and surrounding areas, on 29 May 1652.

== Prelude ==
Zaporozhian Cossacks conducted numerous raids on Istanbul for half of the 17th century. However, Cossacks ceased their sea raids on the Ottoman Empire in 1648, with the outbreak of Khmelnytsky Uprising and formation of the Cossack state. Despite this, Don Cossacks continued their sea raiding career for another few decades for which the Zaporizhians were previously well-known. On 29 May 1652, Don Cossacks conducted one of such raids on the capital of the Ottoman Empire, Istanbul.

== Raid ==
1,000 Don Cossacks on 15 boats set off on a raid towards Istanbul, led by Ataman Ivan Bogatyi. Cossack appearance in the capital came as a surprise. After unexpectedly appearing at the walls of Istanbul, Cossacks took the opportunity to plunder capital's suburbs and its nearby settlements. Cossacks took the loot and 150 Turk captives with them, proceeding to return home. However, Cossack encountered an Ottoman fleet on the way back. It consisted of 10 boats and was commanded by Melek Ahmed Pasha, which went into battle with the Cossacks. Cossacks won this battle, inflicting heavy losses on the Ottoman forces.

== Aftermath ==
Don Cossacks of Ivan Bogatyi after a successful raid brought the captives and loot with them to Voronezh. Cossack losses during the raid were relatively light, with all 15 Cossack boats making it back.

== See also ==
- Cossack raid on Istanbul (1615)
- Cossack raid on Istanbul (1620)
- Cossack raids on Istanbul (1624)
- Cossack raid on Istanbul (1629)
