= Cossack raids on Istanbul (1624) =

Raids of the Zaporozhian Cossacks on the capital of the Ottoman Empire in 1624

- Part of the Cossack raids and Cossack naval campaigns
Date	9 July – 8 September 1624
Location	Istanbul, Marmara Region, Ottoman Empire
Result	Cossack victory

Belligerents
Zaporozhian Cossacks	Ottoman Empire

Commanders and leaders
Mykhailo Doroshenko; Hryhoriy Chornyi	(Ottoman Empire) Murad IV (Ottoman Empire) Damat Halil Pasha

Strength
3,500–4,000 and 7,500; 70–80 and 150 boats	7,500–15,000; 25 galleys 300 boats

Casualties and losses
Several captured	Heavy

The Cossack raids on Istanbul (Ukrainian: Козацькі рейди на Стамбул, Turkish: İstanbul'a Kazak baskınları; 9 July – 8 September 1624) was a raids on the capital of the Ottoman Empire Istanbul by the Zaporozhian Cossacks under the command of Mykhailo Doroshenko and Hryhoriy Chornyi as a part of the Cossack Naval Campaigns.

== Background ==
For centuries, beginning with the rule of Casimir the Great since the 14th century, Poland had vied for expansion in the Ruthenian lands Halyč and Podolia against rivals Hungary and Lithuania, resulting in the formation of the Jagiellonian dynasty, known as the Polish-Lithuanian Commonwealth by 1569. Increased Polish influence and autonomy over southwestern Ruthenia brought conflict with the Giray Khans whose raids in the Black Sea region had intensified.

Against this backdrop, the Cossack organization Zaporozhian Host had organized as a political-military fraternity who began to raid the Crimean Khanate and Ottoman Empire as their military strength increased, penetrating into the Empire as far as Istanbul's suburbs, which they pillaged in the early 17th century.

== First raid ==
In summer of 1624, Turkish admiral Recep Pasha raided Kafa to subdue Tatar vassals. The Cossacks decided to use this moment to attack Istanbul. Despite rumors and warnings about the possibility of a terrible attack, admiral ignored them and went to Crimea.

The capital was left without defenses. At that time Zaporozhians on 70-80 Chaikas (Cossack boats) appeared on two sides of the Bosphorus. On the night of July 9, the Cossacks attacked the city, plundering and burning residential and administrative buildings. Beylerbeyi, Vaniköy was destroyed on the European coast.

During six hours Cossacks destroyed the rows of magnificent villas and homes, after which (at about 9 o'clock in the morning) they returned to the sea.

Sultan Murad IV, despite the lack of a fleet, decided to punish the Cossacks for the crime. He compensated for his lack of galleys using various civilian boats. Hoping to scare Cossacks with the size of his force, he sent several hundred vessels under the control of Damat Halil Pasha. Seeing this improvised armada, the Cossacks waited in the middle of the Strait, set their boats in a semicircle and waited. The wind gave the Cossacks the opportunity to attack the Turks.

The Turks pushed on, but the Cossacks did not react. Damat Halil Pasha thought that if the Turks were unsuccessful, the Cossacks would make an even more significant blow to Istanbul. By evening the Cossacks were in the coastal waters of Istanbul, and then they returned to their homeland.

== Second raid ==
After two weeks, the Ottoman capital faced at least 150 chaikas, each with a 50-man crew. Turkish sources reported reserves who swam behind.

102 Cossack chaikas came to the Ottoman fleet under the command of Pasha, consisting of 25 large galleys, assisted by 300 smaller boats (25-50 people likely in each). The battle lasted several days; In the end, the Cossacks smashed the Turkish fleet, and then attacked Istanbul.

== Aftermath ==
The sofa, worried by the actions of the Cossacks, sent messengers to Rejb-Pasha telling him to ignore Crimean affairs and return to Istanbul.

Cossack prisoners said that they acted as if they were committing these attacks in agreement with the Tatars. This further damaged the relationship between the Ottoman Empire and the Crimean Khanate.

== See also ==
- Cossack raid on Istanbul (1615)
- Cossack raid on Istanbul (1620)
- Cossack raid on Istanbul (1629)
- Cossack raid on Istanbul (1652)

== Sources ==
- М. Грушевський. Історія України-Руси. Том VII. Розділ VIII. Стор. 5.
- Hist. R. mon. c. 427
