= Cossack raid on Istanbul (1620) =

Cossack raid of Perekop (1620)
- Part of the Cossack raids, Cossack naval campaigns the Ottoman–Polish War (1620–1621)
Date	1620
Location	Istanbul, Üsküdar, Marmara Region, Ottoman Empire
Result	Cossack victory

Belligerents
Zaporozhian Cossacks	Ottoman Empire

Commanders and leaders
Yakiv Borodavka-Neroda; Ivan Sirko	(Ottoman Empire) Mustafa I

The Cossack raid on Istanbul (Note: Turkish: İstanbul'a Kazak Baskını Ukrainian: Козацький напад на Стамбул) led by Yakiv Borodavka-Neroda on the capital of the Ottoman Empire as a part of the Cossack Naval Campaigns and the Ottoman–Polish War (1620–1621).

== Raid ==
In 1620 relations between the Ottoman Empire and the Polish-Lithuanian Commonwealth were rapidly deteriorating due to frequent raids from Cossacks. The Ottomans stated that they would break their peace agreement and declare war against Poland if they did not stop the Cossack raids.

The Ottomans promised to abandon these plans if, within four months, the Commonwealth destroyed the Cossacks. Although the Polish ambassador in Istanbul agreed, negotiations soured as the Ottoman ambassador was treated with disrespect. Thus, the Ottomans decided to end the Cossack raids themselves and proceeded to build a string of fortresses in southern Ukraine as preparation. However, the Cossacks had already decided to attack Turkey. Having learned about this, the Polish ambassador immediately escaped from Istanbul. The result of the raid was a Cossack victory.

The Cossacks then raided Varna on the Bulgarian coast, then proceeded to raid the Crimean city of Perekop. The cities were completely looted.

== Aftermath ==
The raid formed the pretext for the Battle of Cecora (1620).

== See also ==
- Cossack raid on Istanbul (1615)
- Cossack raids on Istanbul (1624)
- Cossack raid on Istanbul (1629)
- Cossack raid on İstanbul (1652)

== Sources ==
1. М. Грушевський. Історія України-Руси. Том VII. Розділ VII. Стор. 7.
