= Cossack raid on Istanbul (1629) =

- Part of the Cossack raids and Cossack naval campaigns
Date	1629
Location	Istanbul, Marmara Region, Ottoman Empire
Result	Cossack victory

Belligerents
Zaporozhian Cossacks	Ottoman Empire

Commanders and leaders
Bohdan Khmelnytsky; Ivan Sirko	(Ottoman Empire) Kskenash Pasha

Strength
4,000; 300 boats	40 galleys

Casualties and losses
7 boats captured	Heavy: Significant damage to Ottoman fleet; 2 galleys captured

The Cossack raid on Istanbul (Ukrainian: Козацький рейд на Стамбул, Turkish: İstanbul'a Kazak baskını; 1629) was led by Bohdan Khmelnytsky and Ivan Sirko against the capital of Ottoman Empire and surrounding areas.

== Prelude ==
The Zaporozhian Cossacks conducted raids on the territory of the Ottoman Empire, including the capital city of Istanbul. The most notable raid was the raid on Istanbul in 1615, which resulted in destruction of Ottoman fleet. Another such raid was conducted on a similar scale in 1629, which was led by the future Cossack Hetman Bohdan Khmelnytsky and Kosh Otaman Ivan Sirko.

== Raid ==
The Cossack boats reached outskirts of Istanbul. Cossacks plundered the surrounding settlements and set them on fire. The smoke was visible, which reportedly caused fear and confusion for inhabitants of Istanbul, including Sultan Murad IV. After disturbing the capital, Cossacks plundered Kishic, Izmail, Balchik, Varna and Sizbol in the West. Cossacks got all sorts of loot, but Ottoman galleys caught up with some of the Cossacks which fortified themselves on an island in a monastery. For the rescue of besieged Cossacks, 8 Cossack boats were sent. Cossacks landed on the shore and rescued the besieged Cossacks. After these events, Cossacks headed to the Sich.

== Aftermath ==
The raid was successful and Cossacks returned to the Sich with loot. Ivan Sirko mentioned this raid in his letter to the Crimean Khan on September 23, 1675. Sirko wrote the following:

Our brothers the Cossacks, fighting on ships along the Black Sea, bravely touched the very walls of Constantinople, and fumigated them with gunpowder smoke in the presence of the sultan himself.

== See also ==
- Cossack raid on Istanbul (1615)
- Cossack raid on Istanbul (1620)
- Cossack raids on Istanbul (1624)
- Cossack raid on Istanbul (1652)
