= Baidak =

Wooden sailing ship

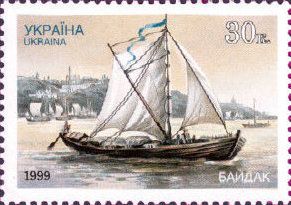
Stamps of Ukraine, 1999

Baidak (Russian: байда́к, Belarusian: байда́к, Ukrainian: байда́к) was a wooden sailing ship, similar to a cog. It had a flush-laid flat bottom approximately 3–4 metres wide, which narrowed to tapered ends, and one 5 metre mast. Measuring approximately 15–20 (or 36–60) metres in length, a baidak could carry a load of approximately 200 tons. It could be operated by oars or sail.

Baidaky were in use from the 16th–19th centuries in the territory of present-day Ukraine, primarily for cargo delivery on the Dnipro and Don rivers, however, they were also frequently used by the Zaporizhian Cossacks for their military campaigns to the Black Sea.

== See also ==
- Chaika (boat)
