= Bolesław II the Bold's expedition to Kiev (1069–1071) =

- Part of the 1065–1069 rebellion of Vseslav of Polotsk
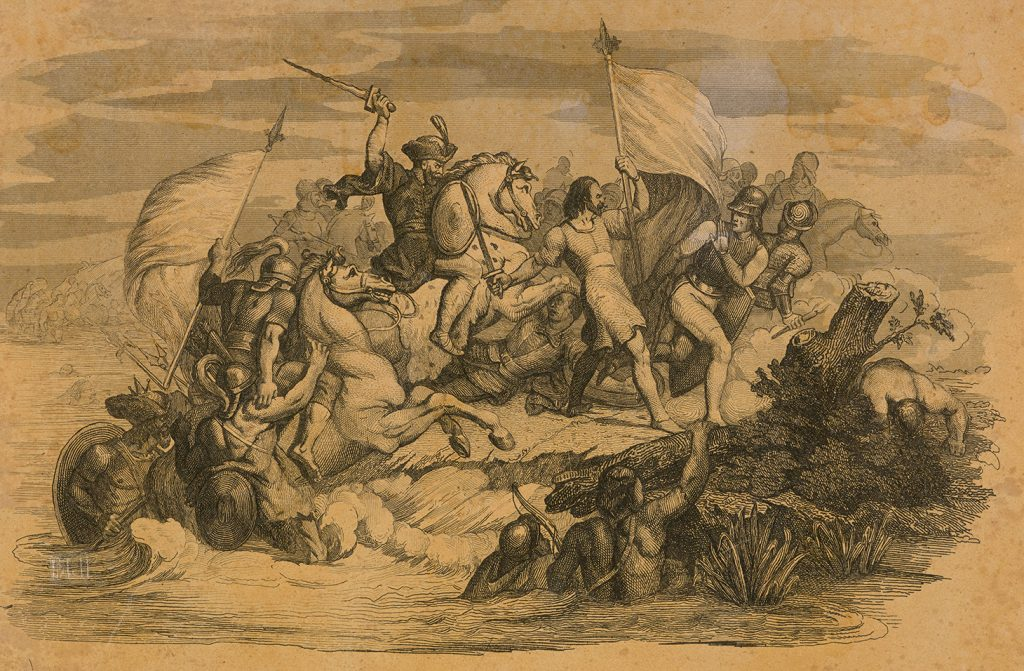
- Bolesław the Bold with his team on a 19th-century French engraving.
Date	Summer 1069 – 1071
Location	Kiev, Cherven cities, Kievan Rus
Result	Polish victory
Territorial changes	Temporary occupation of Kiev by Polish forces

Belligerents
Kingdom of Poland	Kievan Rus; Pechenegs; Varangians

Commanders and leaders
Bolesław II the Bold; Wszebor; Iziaslav I of Kiev; Sviatopolk II of Kiev	Vseslav of Polotsk; Sviatoslav II of Kiev

Strength
Unknown	Unknown

Bolesław II the Bold's expedition to Kiev in 1069 aimed to assert Polish influence in the region, mirroring the conquests of his predecessor, Bolesław the Brave. Bolesław II the Bold occupied Kiev where he put the allied Iziaslav I of Kiev on the throne and on the way back occupied Przemyśl and annexed Cherven Cities to Poland.

== Background ==
Bolesław II the Bold, born circa 1042, was not only the son of Casimir I the Restorer but also the great-grandson of Bolesław I the Brave, a significant figure in Polish history. His lineage traced back to illustrious rulers, giving him a strong claim to the throne. Bolesław's mother, Maria Dobroniega of Kiev, held familial ties to the influential Kievan prince Yaroslav the Wise, which further enriched his connections to powerful Eastern European dynasties.

Ascending to the Polish throne in 1058, Bolesław assumed leadership at a remarkably young age, likely around 15, setting a precedent as the youngest ruler in Polish history. Despite his youth, Bolesław displayed early signs of promise and assertiveness, characteristics that would define his reign.

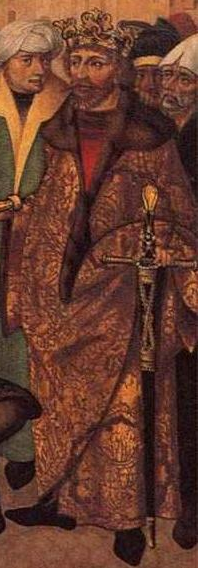
Bolesław II the Bold

His marriage, often speculated to be to a Russian princess, strengthened diplomatic ties with the East. While chronicler Jan Długosz mentioned her as Wiaczesława or Wiszesława, the exact origins of Bolesław's wife remain debated among historians. Nevertheless, their marriage further solidified Bolesław's connections with Rus', increasing his authority in Eastern affairs.

Bolesław's reign was marked by a mix of praise and criticism. Chronicler Gallus Anonymous lauded his generosity and valor, earning him the title "the most generous among the generous." However, Gallus also noted Bolesław's flaws, particularly his impulsiveness and vanity, which sometimes clouded his judgment and led to reckless actions.

In foreign policy, Bolesław followed the footsteps of his illustrious predecessor, Bolesław the Brave, with a keen focus on Eastern relations, notably with Rus'. His interventions in Kiev, particularly in support of his uncle Prince Iziaslav I of Kiev during internal disputes, demonstrated his commitment to maintaining Polish influence in the region. The pinnacle of Bolesław's Eastern ventures came with his expedition to Kiev in 1069, mirroring the conquests of Bolesław the Brave in 1018.

== Expedition ==
At the beginning of the summer, he ordered all knights to be under arms and to gather an army, both on horseback and on foot, from all over the kingdom for the Rus' expedition, under the pretense that he wants to restore the capital to his brother Iziaslav, prince of Kiev, but in reality to win Rus for himself. And all that he considered necessary for the future war he distributed with great care either personally or through his commanders, especially the voivode Wszebor, distributing a large amount of money to soldiers on horseback and on foot, so that they set out on the expedition with even more enthusiasm and zeal. For the brave king wished to surpass the fame of his great-grandfather. He complained, moreover, that all the Rus lands which had fallen to him by conquest and inheritance from his mother, now in the possession of the Rus princes, had been illegally seized by them with the knowledge of his father, King Casimir I the Restorer, or with his tacit permission. So when huge armies gathered from all over the kingdom at the king's side, before setting out for the lands of his enemies he spoke to them thus:

Our ancestors, distinguished themselves by such valor, such honesty and courage that they subjected many neighboring countries to the authority of the Kingdom of Poland, and made the Sava, Ossa and Sula rivers the borders of their kingdom, having driven columns into their depths. And now we see how, as a result of civil unrest, our seats have been depleted, when Ruthenia itself, subject to our authority by virtue of the law to which nations obey, and by virtue of conquest, the greater part of which is due to me by inheritance from my mother and grandfather, does not obey our authority. In order to crush its rebellion, I myself have taken up arms, and I have ordered you to be under arms. With great courage, therefore, undertake this war, for you will not soon see your wives, children and our common mother, whom we are leaving at this moment, the homeland, until Ruthenia is conquered.

— Bolesław II the Bold, Roczniki czyli kroniki sławnego królestwa Polskiego, vol 3

The next day the king, accompanied by Prince Iziaslav of Kiev and his sons, entered Kievan Rus and advanced in compact formation for several days. At the head of the Polish army was comes Wszebor.

=== Conquest of Kiev and Polotsk ===
In turn, the prince of Polotsk, Vseslav of Polotsk, who had driven Iziaslav out of Kiev, gathered an army not to be despised, consisting of Ruthenians, Pechenegs and Varangians to fight against the Polish king. But when he was about to threaten King Bolesław's path to further Rus lands, he met him near Białogród, and when he saw the mighty army of the Polish king, he collapsed in spirit and did not dare to fight a battle with Bolesław, for he saw that his forces were much weaker. Without the knowledge of his knights, having informed the few who accompanied him, he left the army and fled to Polotsk. And his army, worried and frightened by the escape of their leader, scattered in different directions. The Polish king, notified by scouts that the Ruthenians and other enemies had seceded to defend the stronghold, occupied further territories. Meanwhile, the Ruthenian elders of Kiev sent envoys to Princes Sviatoslav and Vseslav to Chernigov with such a message:

Although we have acted wickedly in driving our prince Iziaslav out of Kiev, you nevertheless come and defend the Kiev castle against the Poles and their king Bolesław because his army is large and too strong, and we will not be able to resist him. If you do not do so, we will burn down Kiev Castle before it falls into the hands of the Poles, while we ourselves, knowing our possessions, children and families, will go overseas to Greece to escape the yoke of the angry enemy.

— Envoys of Vseslav and Sviatoslav, Roczniki czyli kroniki sławnego królestwa Polskiego, vol 3

From princes Sviatoslav and Vseslav, the Kievans receive a kind reply that they will send envoys to Prince Iziaslav and ask him to refrain from hostile moves with the Polish army and to peacefully enter their country in order to take back all their possessions. If he were to agree to this, they promise that with their might they would court him and not allow the property of their grandparents, their capital city and its population to be conquered by the Poles and their king. They also immediately sent envoys to Prince Iziaslav. When these met him near Kiev, they addressed him and the Polish King Bolesław on behalf of the princes Sviatoslav and Vseslav with the following words:

In vain, you brought such a strong army to such distant lands. In vain you are making great efforts, when you see that your enemy, the prince of Polotsk, Vseslav and all your opponents have fallen to the wayside. Leave the Poles and return in peace to your headquarters in Kiev, for you have no enemy here. Distract the Poles from destroying our land and the lands of the Rus. And if any resentment prompts you to avenge the injustice suffered from the people of Kiev, then there at will take revenge on the people of Kiev and the castle without the use of sword and fire, so long as the Poles do not take revenge on us and our people.

— Kievan elders, Roczniki czyli kroniki sławnego królestwa Polskiego, vol 3

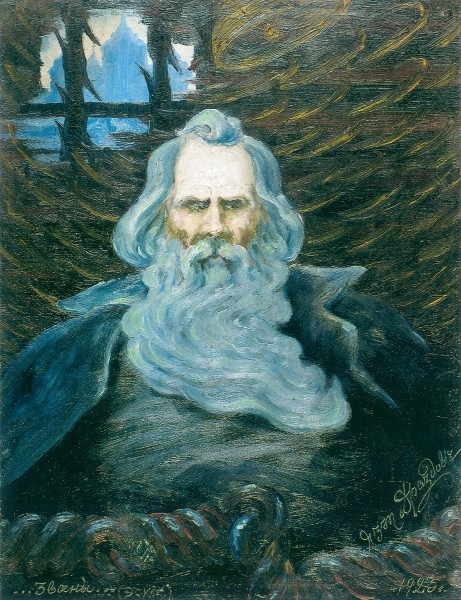
Vseslav of Polotsk

After accepting this message, King Bolesław, along with Prince Iziaslav and the knights, left part of the army with the wagon. However, having ordered him to follow, he moved quickly toward Kiev. However, fearing deceit and treachery from the assurances of the deputies, they send forward to Kiev Iziaslav's son Mstislav with a certain number of Polish and Ruthenian knights to find out if there was peace among the Kievans and to prevent them from using deceit and treachery. Upon arrival, the perpetrators and leaders of the conspiracy, seventy in number, were partially blinded, some murdered and took cruel revenge, losing even those who pretended to be innocent. But when Mstislav reported that there was complete security and calm among the inhabitants, and that King Bolesław of Poland had arrived with Prince Iziaslav, the Kievans first came out to meet him seven miles away, and then welcomed him, offering magnificent gifts. King Boleslaw spent the summer, autumn and winter there with his entire army. In turn, Polish soldiers wintered in towns and villages, and Prince Iziaslav supplied everyone with both clothing and food. Iziaslav set off with Polish soldiers during the Polish king's stay in Kiev against the prince of Polotsk, Vseslav, but Vseslav, fearing the power of Iziaslav and the Poles, fled. Iziaslav, in turn, having captured the castle of Polotsk and the surrounding area, settled his son Mstislav there, and when he died within a few days, he put his other son Sviatopolk in his place, after which he returned to Kiev. Bolesław's triumphal entry into Kiev, was marked by a symbolic act at the Golden Gate when Bolesław struck the gate and chipped his sword. However, his pride and arrogance, evident in his interaction with Prince Iziaslav, also revealed his vulnerabilities, which he accomplished by sitting on a horse while lumbering his relative by the beard. Most historians have related this anecdote precisely to the year 1069, in which case Iziaslav was clearly humiliated by the Polish ruler. What Boleslaw wanted to achieve with his actions will forever be shrouded in mystery.

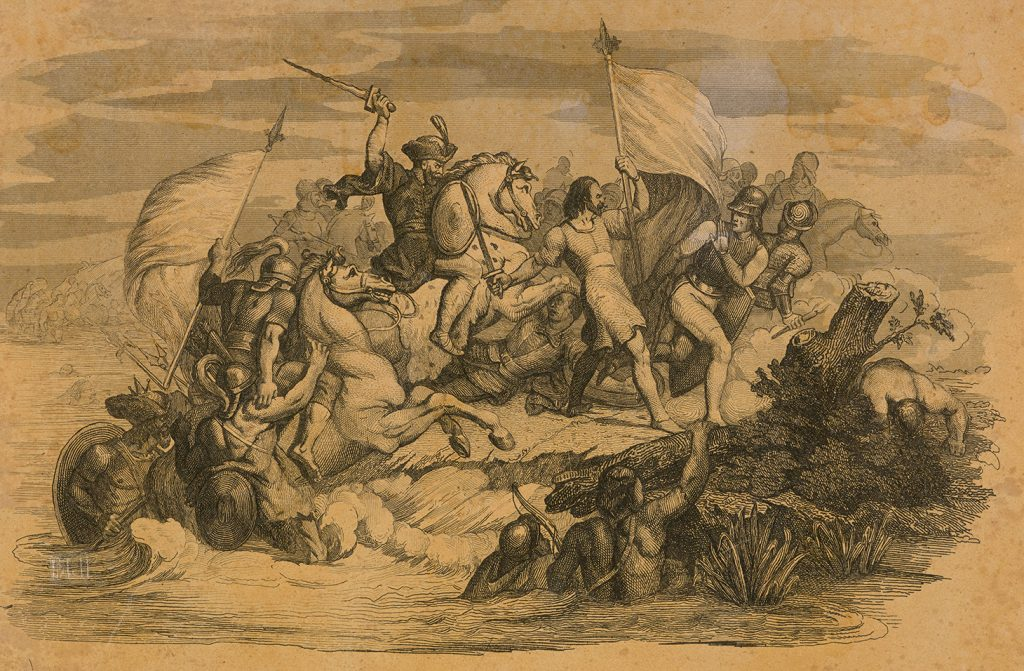
Bolesław the Bold with his team on a 19th-century French engraving

=== Capture of Przemyśl and conquest of Cherven Cities ===
After spending the winter in Kiev, the Polish monarch departed early from his winter encampment once the conditions were favorable for military operations. Acknowledged along with his army by Prince Izasław with lavish gifts, Bolesław proceeded towards Przemyśl, seizing various fortifications and strongholds along the San River, some through cooperation, others by coercion. Learning that Przemyśl sheltered many Ruthenian people seeking refuge from neighboring fortresses and villages, Bolesław resolved to launch a full-scale assault.

Przemyśl, a sizable city teeming with inhabitants and newcomers, fortified with deep trenches, high walls, and guarded by the San River from the north, posed a formidable challenge. Hindered temporarily by the swollen San River caused by heavy rains, Bolesław eventually crossed with his troops and established a camp near the city.

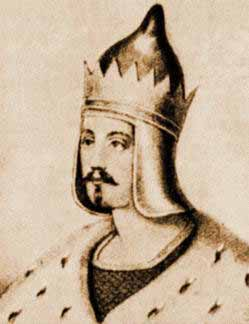
Iziaslav I of Kiev

Exploiting opportunities, he dispatched soldiers to harass enemy fields, prompting the foes to retreat to forests and marshes, some too intimidated to venture beyond their fortified positions. The capture of abundant livestock, grain, and provisions enriched Bolesław's camp, sustaining his forces during the prolonged siege. Despite skirmishes yielding no decisive outcome, a significant counterattack compelled a Ruthenian retreat back to Przemyśl, where panic ensued, allowing the Polish forces to capture or disarm many foes. Seizing momentum, Bolesław tightened the siege, eventually securing control over vulnerable sections of the city. With the Rus' people retreating to the castle, Bolesław seized Przemyśl, granting his soldiers looting rights. After providing time for rest and tending to the wounded, he fortified the city and maintained the siege despite the challenges posed by its strategic location and formidable defenses. Convinced that hunger would compel surrender, Bolesław persisted throughout the summer. As the Rus' population weakened from starvation and thirst, they negotiated terms of surrender, relinquishing the castle to Bolesław. Having occupied the stronghold, Bolesław ordered its reconstruction and fortification, relocating soldiers for winter quarters before withdrawing with his advisors to the castle.

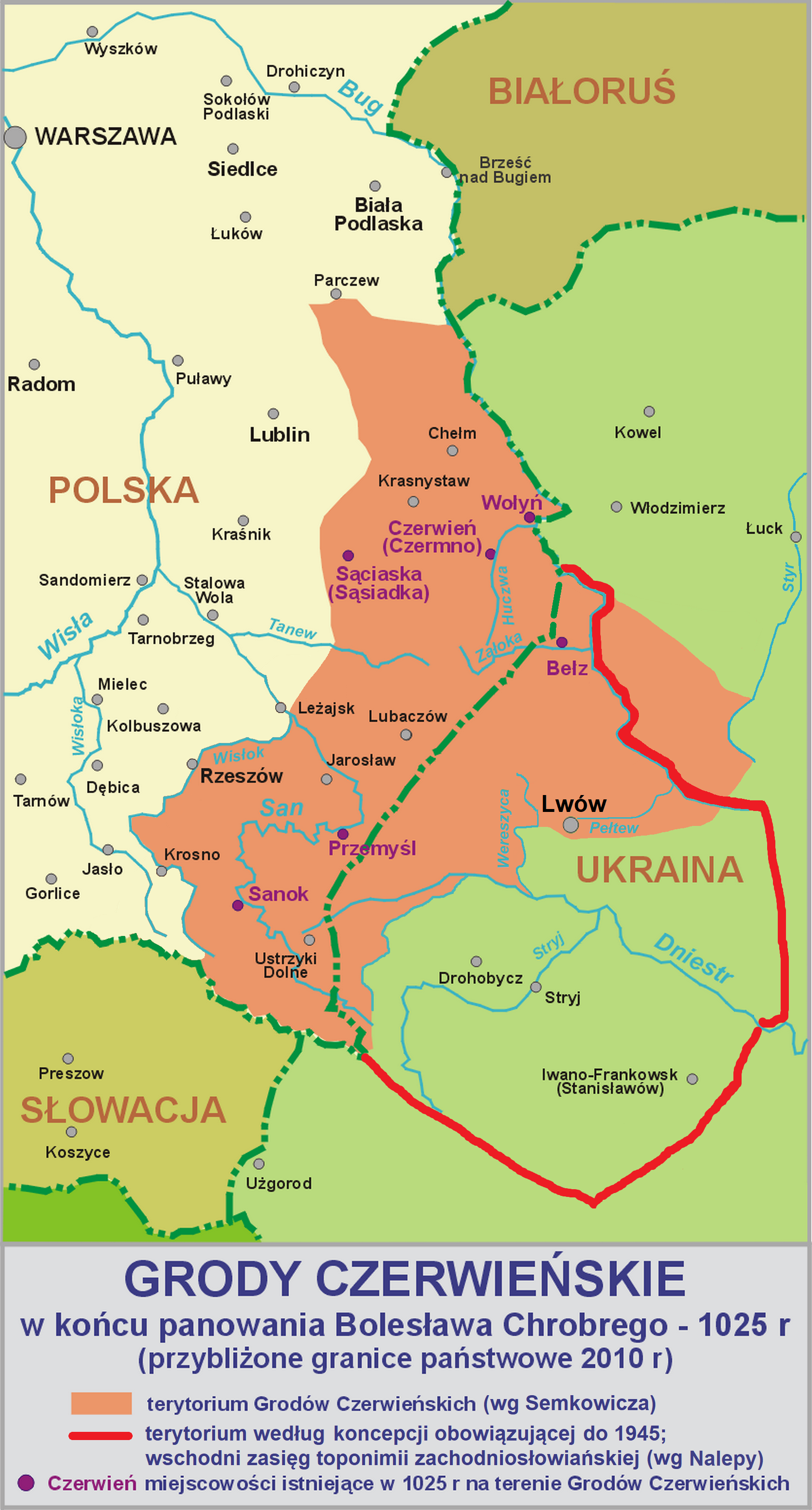
Cherven Cities

== Aftermath ==
Despite initial successes, Bolesław's power in the eastern lands proved was short, with the annexation of Red Ruthenia to Poland and the brief occupation of Kiev in 1069 was short-lived, eventually succumbing to the resurgence of local powers such as Vsevolod I of Kiev.

Bolesław's reign ended tragically in 1081, shrouded in mystery and scandal. His alleged poisoning by his own cook, described by Gallus Anonymus, pointed to political intrigue and internal strife. In addition, rumors of Bolesław's controversial personal life, including alleged affairs with married women, further complicated his legacy and the succession crisis that followed his death.

== See also ==
- Bolesław II the Bold
- Vseslav of Polotsk
- Bolesław I's intervention in the Kievan succession crisis
- Murder of Stanislaus of Szczepanów
- Cherven Cities

== Sources ==
- Długosz Jan, Roczniki czyli kroniki sławnego królestwa Polskiego. vol 3 ISBN 9788301160692
- Norbert Delestowicz, Bolesław II Szczodry. Tragiczne losy wielkiego wojownika 1040/1042 - 2/3 IV 1081 albo 1082, Kraków 2016. ISBN 8377301725
- Kazimierz Jasiński, Rodowód pierwszych Piastów, Warsaw 1993 ISBN 8385218327
- Andrzej Garlicki (pod red.), Poczet królów i książąt polskich, Warsaw 1998. ISBN 8307018226
- R. Grodecki, S. Zachorowski, J. Dąbrowski, Dzieje Polski średniowiecznej, Kraków 1995. ISBN 9788324213269
- Martin, Janet (2007). Medieval Russia: 980–1584. Second Edition. E-book. Cambridge: Cambridge University Press. ISBN 978-0-511-36800-4.
- D. Turkowska i M. Kowalczyk, Jana Długosza Roczniki czyli Kroniki sławnego Królestwa Polskiego, Warsaw 2009. ISBN 9788301160739
- J. Wyrozumski, Dzieje Polski piastowskiej, Kraków 1999. ISBN 8385719385
- Wydział Humanistyczny UMCS, „I Lubelska Jesień Historyczna‛'. Materiały konferencyjne, Lublin 2012. ISBN 978-83-934217-1-8
