= Kiev uprising of 1068 =

Revolt against Grand Prince Iziaslav Yaroslavich of Kiev

The Kiev uprising of 1068 was a revolt against Grand Prince Iziaslav Yaroslavich of Kiev in the aftermath of a Kievan Rus’ defeat at the hands of the Cumans at Battle of the Alta River near the city of Pereiaslavl, southeast of Kiev.

The Polovtsy raid of 1068–1069 was only the tribe's second major raid into Rus’ (they had negotiated a treaty with Prince Vsevolod Yaroslavich of Pereislavl’ (the father of Vladimir Monomach) in 1055, but the tribesmen broke the treaty and attacked Kievan Rus’ six years later, defeating Vsevolod in battle). In 1068-1069, the Polovtsy penetrated the earthwork defensive lines built up over the years by Prince Vladimir Svyatoslavich (r. ca. 980–1015) and his son, Yaroslav the Wise (r. 1019–1054). They were met by a combined army of Yaroslav’s sons: Grand Prince Iziaslav of Kiev and his brothers, Princes Sviatoslav Yaroslavich of Chernigov, and Vsevolod, which was defeated and fled back to Kiev in disarray.

The Polovsty continued to raid throughout the area, prompting the Kievans to call on the grand prince to rearm them so they could march out and meet the threat. Iziaslav refused, prompting the rebellion. The Tale of Bygone Years (in Russian Povest Vremennikh Let), a part of The Lavrentian Chronicle, relates what happened next:

The Kievans who had escaped to their native city held a veche (literally "created a veche") on the marketplace and sent the following communication to the Prince [Iziaslav]: 'The Polovtsy have spread over the country. O Prince, give us arms and horses, that we may offer them combat once more.' Iziaslav, however, paid no heed to this request. Then the people began to murmur against his general (voevoda) Konstantin. From the place of the assembly, they mounted the hill and arrived before the house of Konstantin.

The Kievan mob ransacked Konstantin's house, apparently blaming him for the defeat. They then drove out Iziaslav and freed Prince Vseslav of Polotsk, who had been imprisoned earlier by Iziaslav, Vsevolod, and Sviatoslav, and placed him on the Kievan throne in hopes that he could stop the Polovtsy. Iziaslav, for his part, fled to Boleslaw II of Poland, who supported him with arms with which he returned to Kiev the following May (1069) and took back the throne.

In Iziaslav's absence, Prince Sviatoslav managed to defeat a much larger Polovetsian army on November 1, 1068 and stem the tide of Polovetsian raids. A small skirmish in 1071 was the only disturbance by the Polovtsy for the next two decades. Thus, while the Battle of Alta River was a disgrace for Kievan Rus' and led briefly to the ouster of the grand prince, Sviatoslav's victory the following year relieved the Polovtsy threat to Kiev and Chernigov for a considerable period and allowed Iziaslav the breathing space necessary to reclaim the throne.

The uprising has been seen by a number of Russian and Soviet historians as proof of the power of the veche, which was rather more important in the northwestern Rus' cities of Novgorod the Great and Pskov (and at a later period) and less important in the south, but showed itself to be important here in displacing a Kievan grand prince and bringing in another one. The veche, usually seen as a public assembly and often quite institutionalized in the literature, would, however, appear in this instance to be little more than an angry mob which sacked the voevoda's house and drove out the prince. It does not appear to be anything like a parliament or legislature as it has often been portrayed in the traditional historiography.

== See also ==
- Bolesław II the Bold's expedition to Kiev (1069–1071)
