= Murder of Stanislaus of Szczepanów =

Date	1077–1079
Location	Kingdom of Poland
Result	Defeat of Bolesław II the Bold

Belligerents
Kingdom of Poland	Rebels

Commanders and leaders
Bolesław II the Bold	Stanislaus X Nobles and magnates

Strength
Unknown	Unknown

The Murder of Stanislaus of Szczepanów by the Polish king Bolesław II the Generous in 1079. He is said to have slain Stanislaus of Szczepanów while he was celebrating Mass in the Skałka outside the walls of Kraków.

== Background ==
Stanislaus initial conflict with King Bolesław was over a land dispute. Stanislaus had purchased for the diocese a piece of land on the banks of the Vistula River near Lublin from a certain Peter (Piotr), but after Piotr's death the land had been claimed by his family. The King ruled for the claimants, but according to legend, Stanislaus resurrected Piotr so that he could confirm that he had sold the land to the bishop.

According to Augustin Calmet, an 18th-century Bible scholar, Stanislaus asked the King for three days to produce his witness, Piotr. The King and the court were said to have laughed at the absurd request, but the King granted Stanislaus the three days. Stanislaus spent them in ceaseless prayer and, dressed in full bishop's regalia, went with a procession to the cemetery where Piotr had been buried three years earlier. He had Piotr's grave dug up until his remains were discovered. Then, before a multitude of witnesses, Stanislaus made Piotr rise, and Piotr did so.

Piotr was then dressed in a cloak and brought before King Bolesław to testify on Stanislaus' behalf. The dumbfounded court heard Piotr reprimand his three sons and testify that Stanislaus had indeed paid for the land. Unable to give any other verdict, the King dismissed the suit against the bishop. Stanislaus asked Piotr whether he would remain alive, but Piotr declined and so was laid to rest once more in his grave and was reburied.

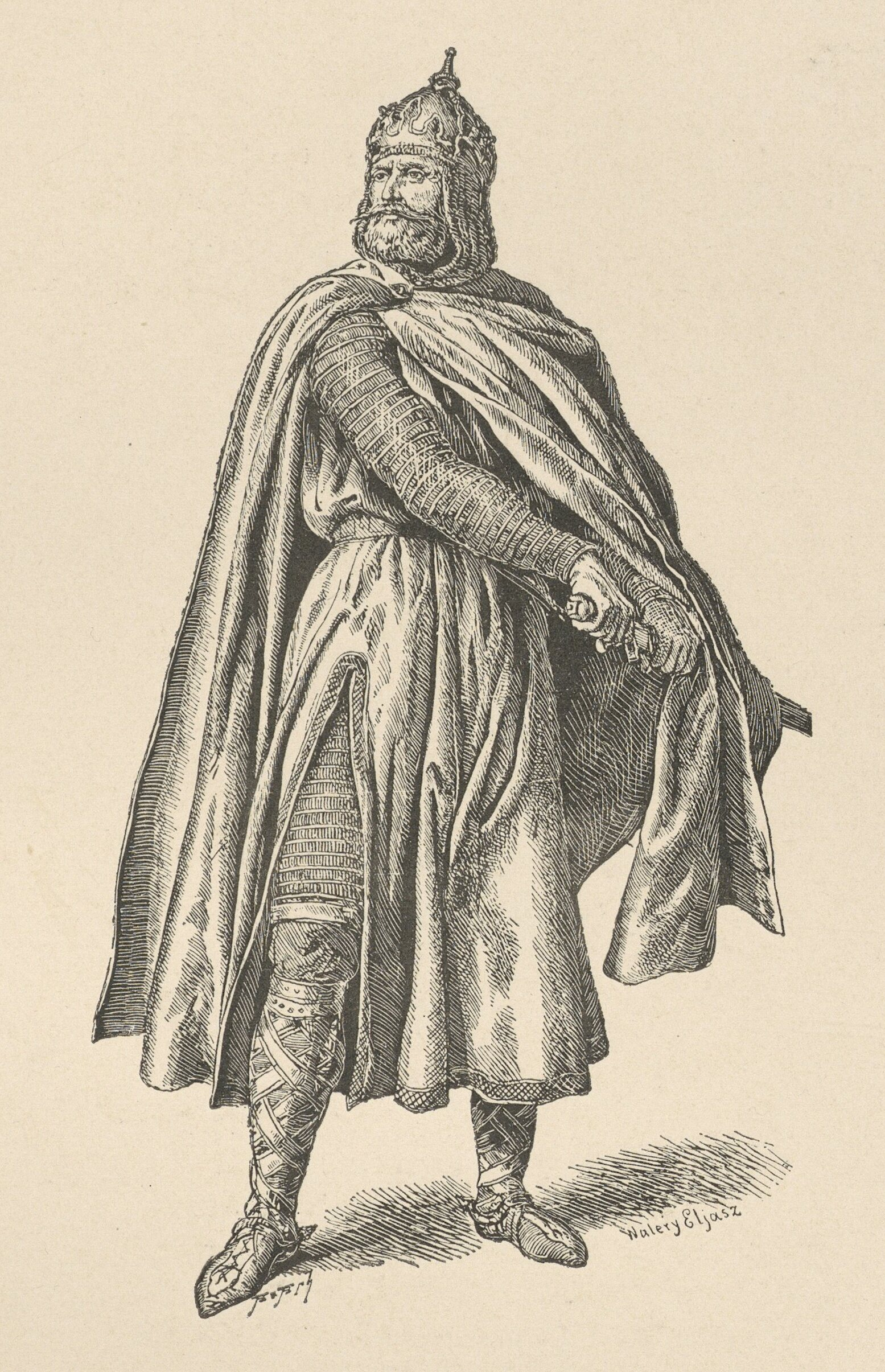
Bolesław II the Bold

A more substantial conflict with King Bolesław arose after a prolonged war in Ruthenia, when weary warriors deserted and went home, alarmed at tidings that their overseers were taking over their estates and wives. According to Wincenty Kadłubek, the King punished the soldiers' faithless wives very cruelly and was criticized for it by Bishop Stanislaus. Jan Długosz, however, writes that the bishop had in fact criticized the King for his own sexual immorality. Gallus Anonymus, in his laconic account, only condemned both the "traitor bishop" and the violent king.

Whatever the actual cause of the conflict between them, the result was that the bishop excommunicated King Bolesław, which included forbidding the saying of the Divine Office by the canons of Kraków Cathedral in case Bolesław attended. The excommunication aided the King's political opponents, and the King accused Bishop Stanislaus of treason and the royal court found him guilty.

== The murder ==
The Polish king sent his men to execute Bishop Stanislaus but when they refused to kill Stanisław, Bolesław decided to kill the bishop himself. Stanislaus was murdered while he was celebrating Mass in the Skałka church outside Kraków. According to ''Polska Piastów'', it was in the Wawel Castle. The guards then cut the bishop's body into pieces and scattered them to be devoured by wild beasts. According to some urban legends, his members miraculously reintegrated while the pool was guarded by four eagles. The exact date of Stanislaus's death is unknown. It was either 11 April or 8 May 1079.

The news of the martyrdom of Bishop Stanislaw grew into a legend over the years. In 1253 the canonization of the Kraków bishop as a saint took place. Every year on May 8, a solemn procession with the relics of St. Stanislaus is held in Krakow from Wawel to Skałka.

== Aftermath ==
The murder led to a civil war and dethronment of Bolesław II the Generous, who had to flee the country, and was succeeded by his brother, Władysław I Herman, he found refuge at the court of King Ladislaus, who also owed his crown to the deposed king. However, according to Gallus Anonymus, Bolesław II's atrocious conduct towards his Hungarian hosts caused his premature death in 1081 or 1082 at the hands of an assassin, probably by poisoning. He was about 40 years old.

Whether Stanislaus should be regarded as a traitor or a hero remains one of the classic unresolved questions of Polish history. His story has a parallel in the murder of Thomas Becket in 1170 by henchmen of England's King Henry II.

== See also ==
- Bolesław II the Bold
- Stanislaus of Szczepanów
- History of Poland during the Piast dynasty
- Civil War in Poland (1704-1706)
- History of Poland
