= List of wars involving the Soviet Union =

This is a list of wars involving the Soviet Union (1922–1991).

== Key ==
Victory
Defeat
Another result*

*e.g. result unknown or indecisive/inconclusive, result of internal conflict inside the Soviet Union, status quo ante bellum, or a treaty or peace without a clear result.

== List ==
| Date | Conflict | Location | Combatant 1 | Combatant 2 | Result |
|---|---|---|---|---|---|
| 1916–1934 | Central Asian Revolt | Central Asia | Russian Empire (until 1917) Russian SFSR: Turkestan ASSR; Kirghiz ASSR; Soviet Union (from 1922) | Basmachi Khiva; Bukhara; Afghanistan | Victory: The revolt is suppressed |
| 1924 | August Uprising | | Soviet Union | Damkom | Victory: The uprising is suppressed; Consolidation of Soviet rule in the Georgian SSR |
| 1925–1926 | Urtatagai conflict | | Soviet Union | Emirate of Afghanistan | Defeat: Peace Treaty; Urtatagui is seized back to Afghanistan; Afghanistan agreement to restrain Basmachi border raids |
| 1929 | Sino-Soviet conflict | | Soviet Union | China | Victory: The provisions of the 1924 agreement are upheld |
| 1929 | Red Army intervention in Afghanistan (1929); Part of the Afghan Civil War (1928–1929) | | Soviet Union; Kingdom of Afghanistan | Emirate of Afghanistan; Saqqawists; Basmachi | Defeat: The Soviet Union failed to change the situation in the country; Red Army withdrawal from Afghanistan back to the USSR; Civil war in Afghanistan continues |
| 1930 | Red Army intervention in Afghanistan (1930) | | Soviet Union | Basmachi | Victory |
| 1932 | Chechen uprising of 1932 | | Soviet Union | Chechen rebels | Victory: The uprising is suppressed |
| 1932–1941 | Soviet–Japanese border conflicts | | Soviet Union; Mongolia | Japan; Manchukuo | Victory: Soviet–Japanese Neutrality Pact |
| 1934 | Soviet invasion of Xinjiang | | Soviet Union; Xinjiang clique (Russian Empire) White Movement; Torgut Mongols | China | Stalemate: Xinjiang divided in two |
| 1936–1939 | Spanish Civil War | Spain | Spain: People's Army; Popular Front; UGT; CNT-FAI; Generalitat de Catalunya; Euzko Gudarostea; Supported by: Soviet Union; Mexico Volunteers International Brigades | Nationalist faction: FET y de las JONS (Note: The only party under Francisco Franco from 1937 onward, a merger of the other factions on the Nationalist side.); FE de las JONS (Note: 1936–1937, then merged into FET y de las JONS); Requetés/CT; CEDA; Renovación Española; Army of Africa; Supported by: (Kingdom of Italy) Italy (Nazi Germany) Germany; Portugal | Defeat: Nationalist faction victory; Fall of the Second Spanish Republic; Beginning of Franco's regime |
| 1937 | Islamic Rebellion in Xinjiang | | Xinjiang Soviet Union (Russian Empire) White Movement | China | Victory: Rebellion is suppressed; Establishment of the rule of Sheng Shicai's Soviet puppet regime over the whole territory of Xinjiang province |
| 1939 | Soviet invasion of Poland (Part of World War II) | | Germany Soviet Union; Slovakia | Poland | Victory: Occupation of Polish territory by Nazi Germany, Soviet Union and Slovakia; Annexation of Soviet-occupied territory into the Byelorussian SSR and the Ukrainian SSR (except for part of the Vilnius Region) |
| 1939–1940 | Winter War (Part of World War II) | | Soviet Union | Finland | Inconclusive: Soviet invasion of Finland repelled and the planned conquest of Finland fails; Moscow Peace Treaty; Cession of the Gulf of Finland islands, Karelian Isthmus, Ladoga Karelia, Salla, and Rybachy Peninsula, and lease of Hanko to the Soviet Union; Expulsion of the Soviet Union from the League of Nations |
| 1940 | Occupation and annexation of the Baltic states (Part of World War II) | | Soviet Union | Estonia; Latvia; Lithuania | Victory: Occupation and annexation of the Baltic states into the Soviet Union |
| 1940 | Soviet occupation of Bessarabia and Northern Bukovina (part of World War II) | | Soviet Union | Romania | Victory: Bessarabia, Northern Bukovina and the Hertsa region annexed into the Soviet Union; formation of the Moldavian SSR |
| 1941–1945 | World War II | | Allied Powers: Soviet Union; United States; United Kingdom; China; France; Poland; Canada; Australia; New Zealand; India; South Africa (Kingdom of Yugoslavia) (Democratic Federal Yugoslavia) Yugoslavia; Greece; Denmark; Norway; Netherlands; Belgium; Luxembourg; Czechoslovakia; Brazil; Mexico | Axis powers: Germany; Japan; Italy; Hungary; Romania; Bulgaria; Slovakia; Croatia; Thailand; Manchukuo; Mengjiang; Wang Jingwei regime | Victory: Debellation of the Third Reich; Fall of Japanese and Italian Empires; Creation of the United Nations; Emergence of the United States and the Soviet Union as rival superpowers; Beginning of the Cold War |
| 1944–1960s | Anti-communist insurgencies in Central and Eastern Europe: Anti-communist resistance in Poland (1944–1953); Guerrilla war in Ukraine (Part of World War II from 1944 to 1945); Guerrilla war in the Baltic states; Hungarian Revolution of 1956; Uprising of 1953 in East Germany | | Soviet Union; East Germany; Polish People's Republic; Czechoslovak Socialist Republic; Hungarian People's Republic; Socialist Republic of Romania; People's Republic of Bulgaria; Socialist Federal Republic of Yugoslavia | Ukrainian insurgents Polish insurgents (Estonia) Estonian insurgents (Latvia) Latvian insurgents (Lithuania) Lithuanian insurgents (Bulgaria) Bulgarian insurgents Serbian insurgents Croatian insurgents Romanian insurgents (Germany) German insurgents Hungarian insurgents | Victory: The insurgencies are suppressed; Soviet hegemony in Eastern Europe preserved |
| 1945 | Soviet–Japanese War (Part of World War II) | | Soviet Union; Mongolia | Japan; Manchukuo | Victory: Karafuto Prefecture annexed into the Soviet Union and incorporated into the Sakhalin Oblast of the Russian SFSR; The Kuril Islands annexed into the Soviet Union and incorporated into the Russian SFSR; The liberation of Manchuria, Inner Mongolia, and northern Korea, and the collapse of the Japanese puppet states therein; The partition of the Korean Peninsula; the Soviet Union occupies North Korea; Manchuria and Inner Mongolia returned to China |
| 1946–1954 | First Indochina War | | France; State of Vietnam; Kingdom of Laos; Cambodia | Viet Minh; Khmer Issarak; Pathet Lao; Japan Japanese holdout Supported by: Soviet Union; China | Victory: Withdrawal of French forces from Indochina; Democratic Republic of Vietnam independence recognized; State of Vietnam, Kingdom of Laos and Kingdom of Cambodia achieve independence; Vietnam was partitioned between North (controlled by the Việt Minh) and South (controlled by the State of Vietnam) |
| 1950–1953 | Korean War | | North Korea China; Soviet Union | United Nations South Korea; United States; United Kingdom; Australia; Belgium; Canada; France; Philippines; Colombia; Ethiopia; Greece; Luxembourg; Netherlands; New Zealand; South Africa; Thailand; Turkey | Ceasefire: Establishment of the Korean DMZ; Minor territorial changes |
| 1955–1975 | Vietnam War | | North Vietnam; Viet Cong and PRG; Pathet Lao; GRUNK (1970–1975); Khmer Rouge; China; Soviet Union; North Korea | South Vietnam; United States; South Korea; Australia; New Zealand; Laos; Cambodia (1967–1970); Khmer Republic (1970–1975); Thailand; Philippines | Victory: Withdrawal of American forces from Indochina; North Vietnamese victory over South Vietnam; Dissolution of the Republic of Vietnam; South Vietnam annexed by North Vietnam; Soviet-aligned communist governments take power in South Vietnam, Laos and Cambodia |
| 1968 | Invasion of Czechoslovakia | | Soviet Union; Bulgaria; East Germany; Hungary; Poland | Czechoslovakia | Victory: The Prague Spring is suppressed; Moscow Protocol; Soviet military presence in Czechoslovakia until 1991 |
| 1969 | Sino-Soviet border conflict | | Soviet Union | China | Victory (status quo ante bellum): Tactical Soviet victory; Strategic Soviet victory: ceasefire agreement signed; 1991 Sino-Soviet Border Agreement |
| 1967–1970 | War of Attrition | | Egypt; Soviet Union; Kuwait; PLO; Jordan; Syria; Cuba | Israel | Inconclusive |
| 1975–1991 | Angolan Civil War | | MPLA; Cuba; Soviet Union; SWAPO; MK | South Africa; UNITA; FNLA; FLEC | Victory: Three Powers Accord; Withdrawal of all foreign forces from Angola; Independence of Namibia |
| 1977–1978 | Ethio-Somali War | | Ethiopia; Cuba; South Yemen; Soviet Union | Somalia; WSLF | Victory: Somalia breaks all ties with the Soviet Bloc |
| 1979–1989 | Soviet–Afghan War | | Soviet Union; Democratic Republic of Afghanistan | Afghan Mujahideen | Defeat: Failure to suppress the Afghan mujahideen insurgency; Geneva Accords of 1988; Soviet withdrawal from Afghanistan; Beginning of the Afghan Civil War |
