= Chaika (boat) =

Type of boat

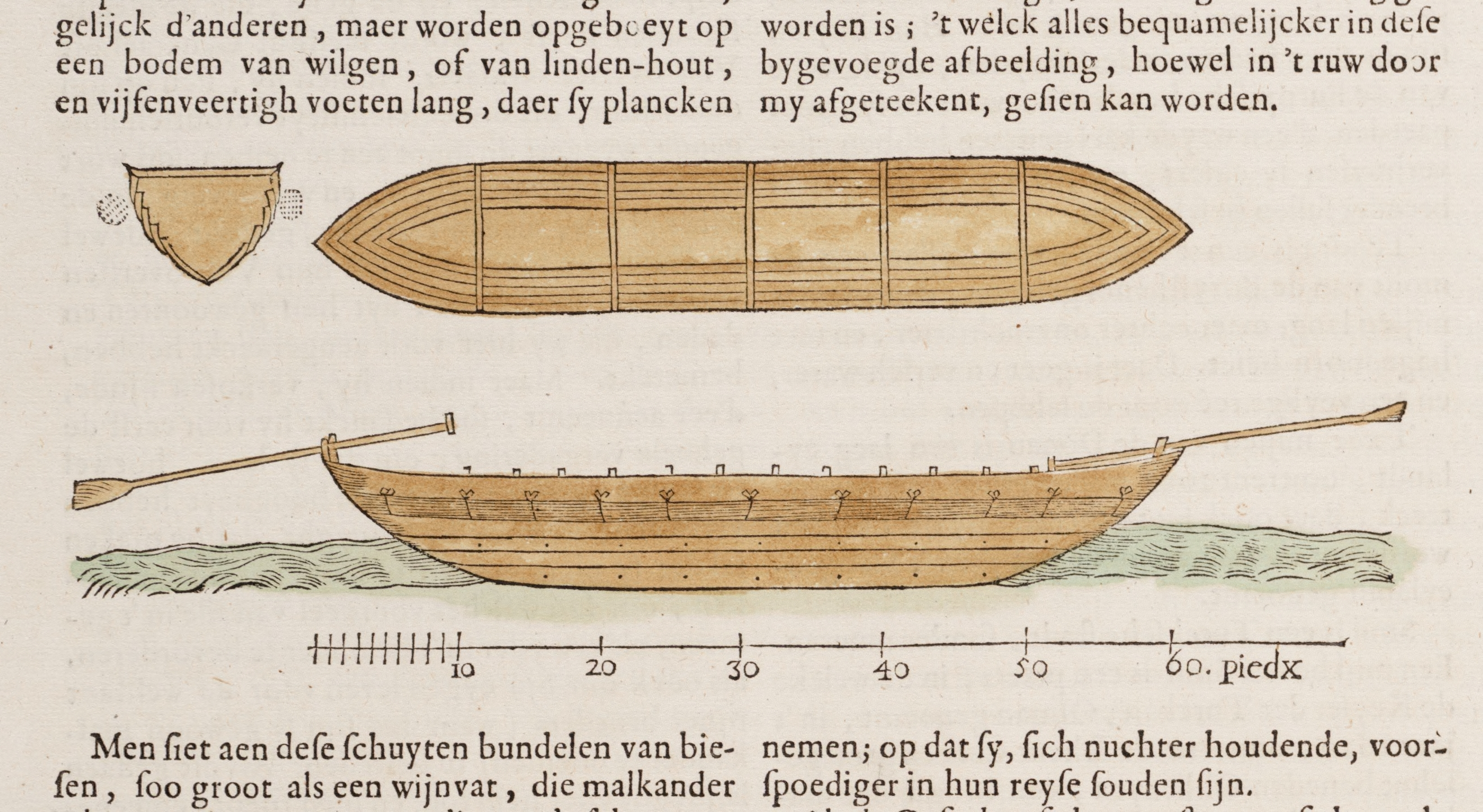
- Chaika in Beauplan's book Description of Ukraine (1664 edition in Dutch)

Development
- Year: 1500s
- Role: Marine warfare/transportation

Boat
- Crew: 50 or 60
- Draft: 4 m (13 ft) (board down)

Hull
- Type: Monohull
- Construction: Wood
- LOA: 20 m (66 ft)
- Beam: 3.5 m (11 ft)

A chaika (Ukrainian: чайка, chayka, Hungarian: csajka, Polish: czajka, Serbian: шајка / šajka, Slovene: šajka or plitka) was a wooden boat that could have a mast and sail, a type of galley, used in early modern warfare and cargo transport in Eastern Europe since the 16th century.

== Types ==
=== Austrian ===
Tschaika were either 48 m (157 ft) (Double Tschaika), 24 m (79 ft) (Ganz ("Full") Tschaika), 12 m (39 ft) (Halb ("Half") Tschaika) or 6 m (20 ft) (Quarter Tschaika) in length, operated by sail or oars. Between 30 and 50 men were in service, commanded by an officer, with a helmsman, an armourer, a drummer, two bowsmen, and up to 36 oarsmen.

=== Zaporizhian Host (Ukraine) ===
Chaikas were between 18–20 m (59–66 ft) in length, 3–3.5 m (9.8–11.5 ft) in width, and 3.5–4 m (11–13 ft) in depth. The bottom of a chaika was carved out of a single tree trunk, with sides built out of wooden planks. To protect the boat from enemy guns or from sinking, reed bales were tied to the gunwales of the boat. One such boat could carry around 50 to 60 men and up to 6 falconets (small cannon). Some chaikas also had two steering oars, so that the boat never needed turning around to switch direction.

A similar, but larger boat used by the Zaporozhian Cossacks for both transport and warfare was called a baidak.

== Gallery ==
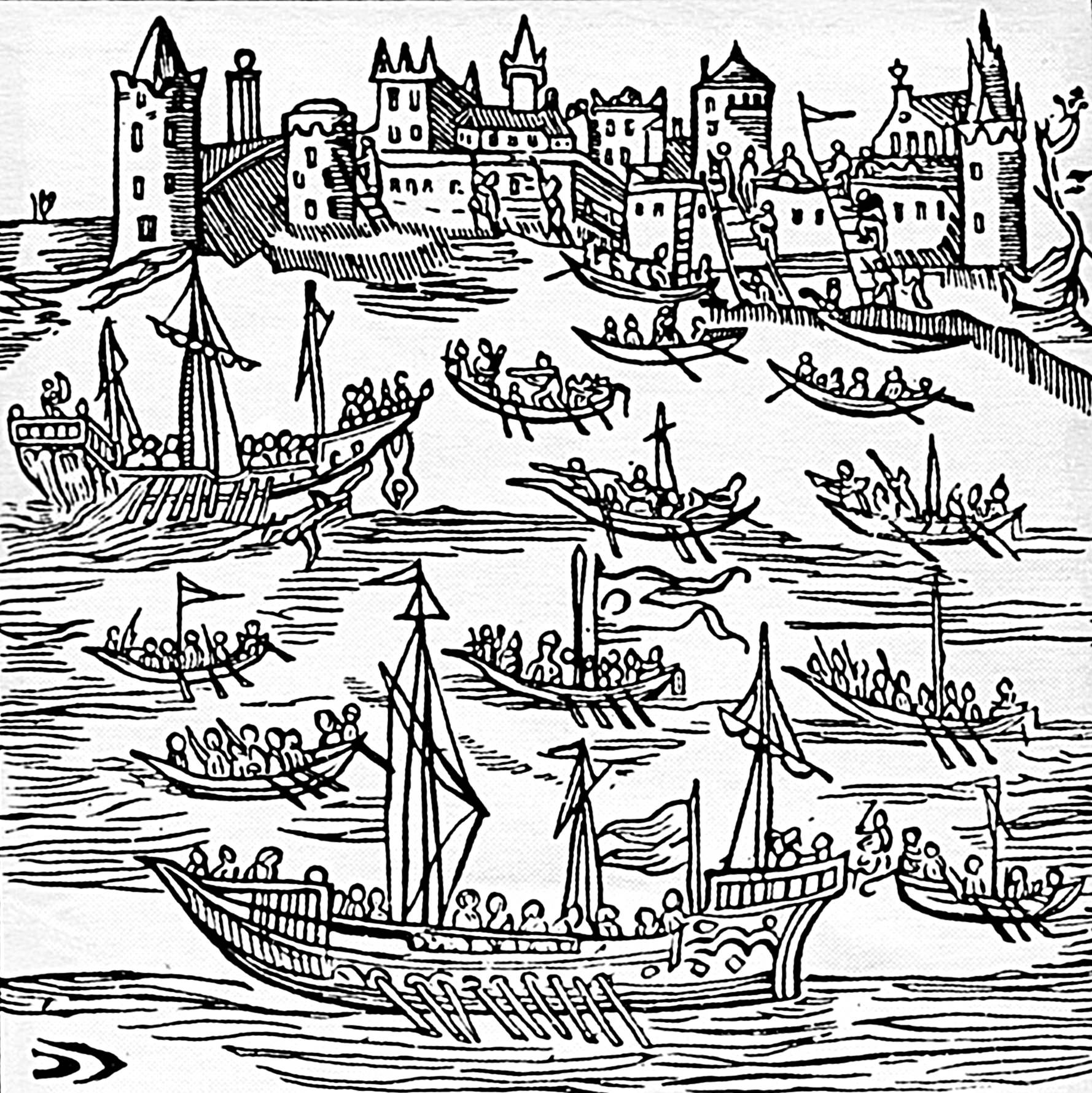
17th century woodcut showing Zaporozhian Cossacks in chaikas, destroying the Turkish fleet and capturing Caffa in 1616.

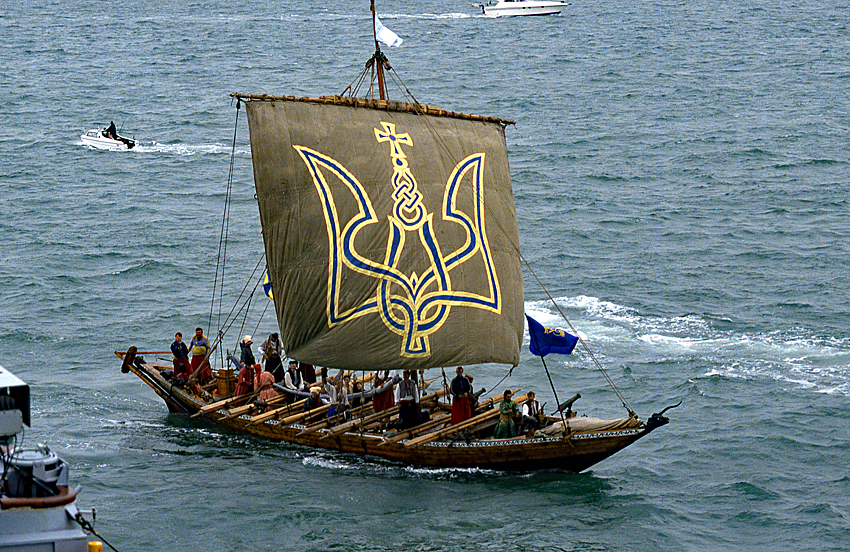
Presviata Pokrova, replica Ukrainian chaika in the Solent

== See also ==
- Šajkaši, river troops
