= Battle of Mozhaysk =

Series of battles at the final stage of the Polish-Muscovite War

- Part of the Moscow campaign of Władysław IV during the Polish–Muscovite War (1609–1618)
Date	January – July, 1618
Location	Mozhaysk, Moscow Regiment, Tsardom of Muscovy
Result	Polish–Lithuanian victory

Belligerents
Polish–Lithuanian Commonwealth	Tsardom of Muscovy

Commanders and leaders
Władysław IV; Jan Karol Chodkiewicz	Dmitry Pozharsky; Dmitry Cherkassky; Boris Lykov

Strength
18,000	16,500

Casualties and losses
Heavy	Heavy

The Battle of Mozhaysk was a series of battles at the final stage of the Polish-Muscovite War (1605–1618) on the western approaches to Moscow. These battles are part of the Moscow campaign of Władysław IV. During months of fighting, the Russian armies managed to maintain their combat capability and prevent the rapid seizure of Moscow. However, the threat of encirclement forced the Russian troops to retreat, opening the way for the enemy to the capital.

== Background ==
After the victory over the Polish-Lithuanian troops in the Battle of Moscow (1612) and the election of Tsar Michael Romanov, Russian troops passed into a counteroffensive. In the years 1613–14 they managed to free most of the captured cities from the Polish-Lithuanian troops and even undertake several raids on the territory of Lithuania. However, the main goal of the campaign – recapture of Smolensk – failed. In turn, the Polish king Sigismund III did not give up attempts to subjugate the Russian state, in the name of his son Władysław. The new campaign in 1617 was presented as an action by the "legitimate" Tsar Władysław Vasa against the "usurper" Michael Romanov. The Crown forces led by Prince Władysław (6,000 men) and Lithuanian under the command of the Great Hetman Jan Karol Chodkiewicz (6,500 men) took part in the campaign. Prince Władysław started from Warsaw on April 5, 1617, but only in September arrived in Smolensk. In October 1617 Dorogobuzh and Vyazma surrendered to "Tsar" Władysław without battle. In fact, on the enemy's path to the capital, there was only poorly fortified Mozhaysk and a weak army with low morale.

== Battle ==
The Russian government pulled all available forces into the western direction, and in the Mozhaysk area, the Poles were given serious resistance. Russian regiments of Voivode Boris Lykov (5,300 cavalry and 460 Streltsy), Dmitry Cherkassky (4,500 cavalry and 780 Streltsy), and Dmitry Pozharsky (3,900 cavalry and 1,500 Streltsy) heavily fortified Mozhaysk and several surrounding towns and monasteries. Fierce fighting near Mozhaysk lasted for entire the spring and summer of 1618, with the Polish-Lithuanian army unable to break Russian defenses. On July 30, 1618, a detachment of Lisowczycy under the command of Chaplinsky blocked the supply route from Moscow. Soon a Cossack defector informed the Russians that Władysław was going to firmly besiege the Russian fortified camps and force them to surrender with hunger. Supplies in the camps were not enough, especially after a part of their train was lost in battle. Realizing this, the government already on August 2, 1618, sent an order to the Voivodes to withdraw from Mozhaysk to Moscow, leaving there a garrison with sufficient supplies.

== Aftermath ==
The fighting near Mozhaysk was not considered a failure by the Russian command. In the course of almost half a year of confrontation (the first half of 1618), Prince Władysław's offensive was delayed, enabling the preparations for the defense of Moscow. The stubborn resistance of the Russian troops dispelled the illusions of the Polish prince about the possibility of resuming the Time of Troubles. On the side of "the lawful Tsar Władysław", only the garrison of Dorogobuzh and several Cossack villages defected. Rebellion against the Romanovs, which Polish invaders expected, did not happen.
