= Siege of Pärnu =

1609 military conflict in Estonia during Polish-Swedish War

- Part of the Polish–Swedish War (1600–1611)
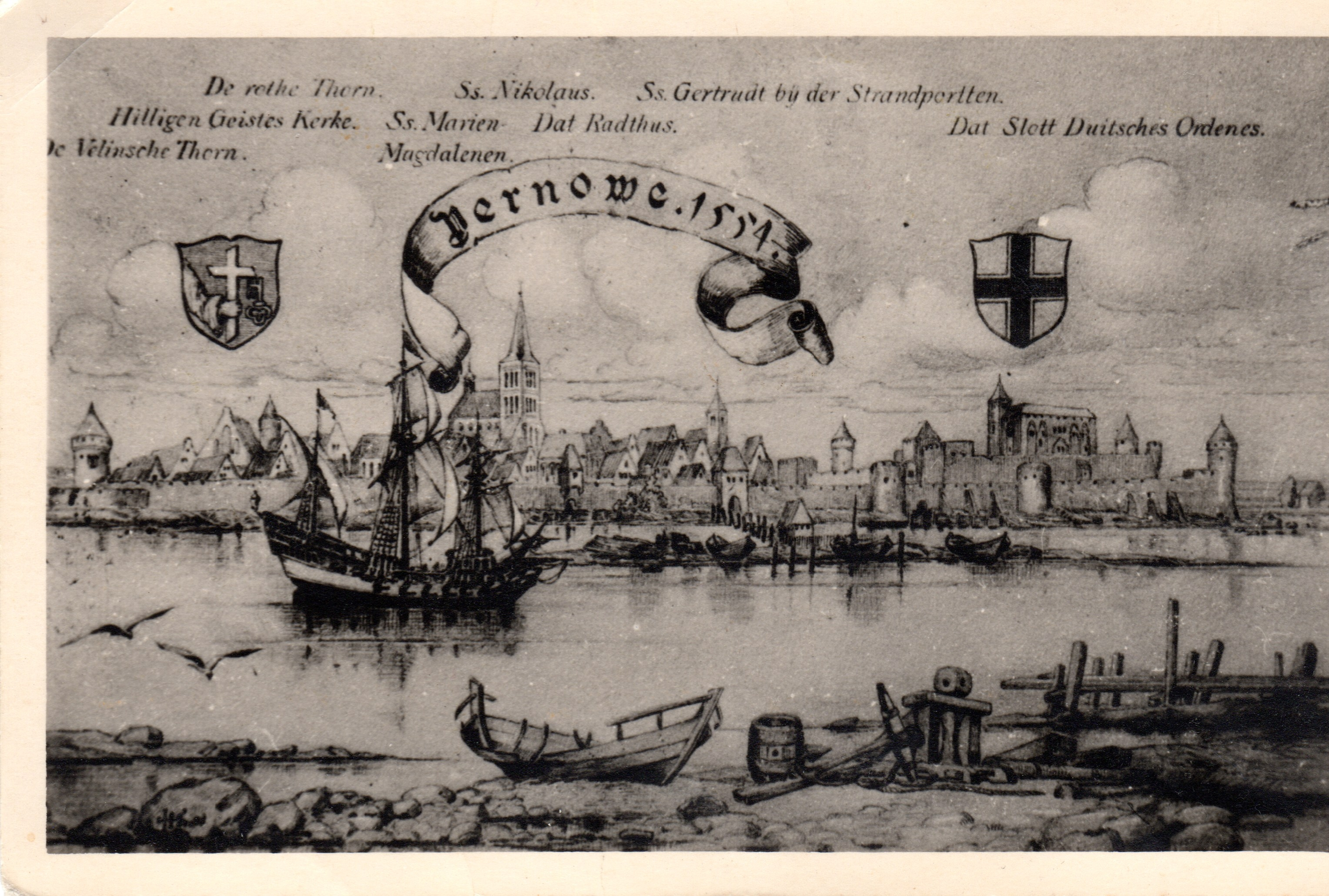
- Pärnu in 1554
Date	February 28 – March 2, 1609
Location	Pärnu, Livonia (now in Estonia)
Result	Polish-Lithuanian victory
Territorial changes	Pärnu is captured by the Commonwealth

Belligerents
Polish–Lithuanian Commonwealth	(History of Sweden (1523–1611)) Sweden

Commanders and leaders
(Polish–Lithuanian Commonwealth) Jan Karol Chodkiewicz	(History of Sweden (1523–1611)) Daniel von Wochen (surrendered)

Casualties and losses
45 killed	100 killed 300 captured 104 Field guns 2 merchant ships

The siege of Pärnu (Polish: Parnawa) took place between February 28 and March 2, 1609 during the Polish–Swedish War (1600–1611).

The Grand hetman of Lithuania Jan Karol Chodkiewicz, while resting his forces in Birże (Biržai), learned of Swedish deployments from Pärnu (present-day Estonia) moving towards Daugavgrīva (in present-day Latvia) and set out to cut these off. However the Swedish units managed to enter Daugavgrīva before Chodkiewicz's arrival and as a result the hetman turned back and moved towards Pärnu, hoping to take the defenders there under command of Daniel von Wochen by surprise. Chodkiewicz's forces arrived on February 28, 1609 but when his troops tried to creep up to the city's walls unnoticed the Swedish garrison fired their cannons which established that a surprise attack was not going to work.

Chodkiewicz then, feigning a withdrawal, hid his forces in nearby woods forbidding his soldiers to even light camp fires, despite the freezing cold of the Estonian winter. After a night's wait he raised his troops and marched them back against the city and this time managed to surprise the defenders. The Polish–Lithuanian miners blew up three of the main gates of the city and Lithuanian troops fought their way to the city's center. When the Polish troops began setting fire to the gate of the town's fortress, to which the remaining Swedish troops had withdrawn, the Swedish garrison threw the keys to the gate out of the window as a signal of surrender.

Swedish losses amounted to 100 Killed and 300 captured, while the Lithuanians lost 45 soldiers. Of the Swedish prisoners,, mostly Scottish mercenaries, subsequently switched sides and joined Chodkiewicz's troops. Additional loot included 104 cannons, 2 merchant ships and numerous boats and barges. After capturing the city, Chodkiewicz left 200 infantry in Pärnu, and began a march towards Riga (then in Polish hands) which was threatened with a siege by the Swedes. On the way however, he attacked Salacgrīva (Salis) which turned into a semi-naval battle and the next major engagement of the conflict.

Charles IX of Sweden later accused Daniel von Wochen of collaborating with the Poles, which he believed was the reason for the surrender. Wochen was then arrested, sentenced to death, and executed.
