= Siege of Fellin =

1602 siege in Estonia during Polish–Swedish War

- Part of the Polish–Swedish War (1600–11)
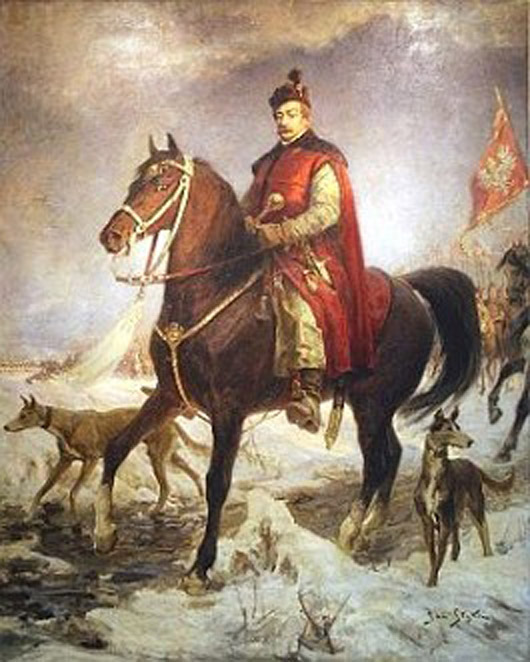
- Hetman Jan Zamoyski
Date	March 25 – May 17, 1602
Location	Fellin, present-day Estonia 58°22′N 25°36′E
Result	Polish-Lithuanian victory

Belligerents
Sweden	Polish–Lithuanian Commonwealth

Commanders and leaders
Jacob De la Gardie	Jan Zamoyski; Stanisław Żółkiewski; Jürgen von Farensbach †

Strength
800	5,000

The siege of Fellin took place between 25 March and 17 May 1602 during the Polish–Swedish War (1600–1611). Polish and Lithuanian forces led by Grand Crown Hetman Jan Zamoyski besieged the Swedish-held town of Fellin (present-day Viljandi in Estonia). The large Polish–Lithuanian army of around 5,000 troops first took the town, while the Swedish defenders, numbering around 800, retreated to the city's castle. After a second frontal attack on the castle, during which the Voivode of Wenden Jerzy Farensbach was killed, the Swedish garrison capitulated, although a group of Finnish soldiers refused to surrender and blew themselves up in the castle's tower. Fellin was later recaptured by the Swedes in a siege in 1608.
