= Siege of Wolmar =

1601 siege of the Polish–Swedish War

Coordinates: 57°32′N 25°25′E

- Part of the Polish–Swedish War (1600–1611)
- Engraving of the Siege of Wolmar
Date	October 18 – December 18, 1601
Location	Wolmar, Poland–Lithuania (now Valmiera, Latvia)
Result	Polish-Lithuanian victory

Belligerents
Sweden	Polish–Lithuanian Commonwealth

Commanders and leaders
Jacob De la Gardie (POW); Carl Carlsson Gyllenhielm (POW)	Jan Zamoyski; Stanisław Żółkiewski; Jürgen von Farensbach

Strength
1,000	15,000; 50 artillery pieces

The siege of Wolmar occurred during the Polish–Swedish War (1600–1611), between October 18 and December 18, 1601.

== History ==
Polish forces, numbering around 15,000, with 50 pieces of artillery, led by the Grand Crown Hetman Jan Zamoyski besieged the city (present-day Valmiera) defended by about 1,000 infantry under Jacob De la Gardie and Carl Carlsson Gyllenhielm. Other notable commanders on the Polish side included the Field Crown Hetman Stanisław Żółkiewski and the field marshal Jürgen von Farensbach (Jerzy Farensbach). The king of Poland, Sigismund III Vasa, was initially present at the siege, but left for Wilno on December 5. At first the Swedish artillery managed to hold back the Poles who did not intend to storm Wolmar without proper siege cannons. However, on December 8 such pieces arrived and an intense bombardment of Wolmar was executed which continued for ten days. Finally on December 18, when the cannons had breached two entrances in the walls, the Polish troops managed to storm the defenses and entered the city.

The Swedish garrison withdrew to the town's castle where they defended themselves and held back the Poles for a while. Later, when the situation became particularly disadvantageous, they asked for conditions of surrender. Survivors of the swedish garrison numbered 519 subsequently, after capitulation, the Swedish officers were taken prisoner by the Poles while the rank and file soldiers were allowed to leave after swearing an oath that they would not continue to fight against the Polish–Lithuanian Commonwealth.

The captured Swedish generals Jacob De la Gardie and Carl Carlsson Gyllenhielm were treated very well until they were transferred to the king. Sigismund decided to lock them in the castle of Rawa. Conditions there became very tough. De la Gardie was exchanged and returned to the Swedish army in 1605. Gyllenhielm was held captive until 1613.
