= Battle of Wesenberg =

Battle or Siege of Wesenberg, Rakvere, or Rakovor may refer to

- Battle of Wesenberg (1268)
- Siege of Wesenberg (1574)
- Battle of Wesenberg (1581)
- Battle of Wesenberg (1603)
- Battle of Wesenberg (1704)
