= Siege of Moscow (1618) =

1618 battle

- Part of the Polish–Russian War (1609–1618)
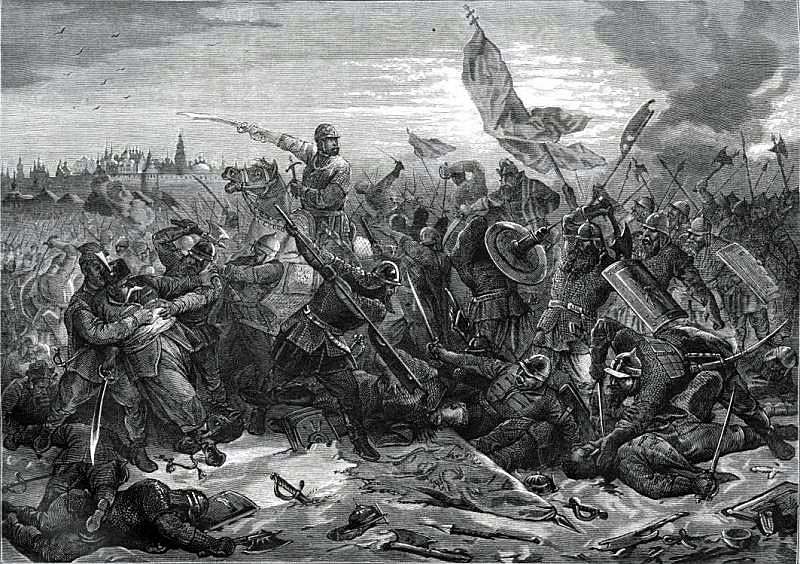
- Battle of Moscow 1612
Date	September–October 1618
Location	Moscow, Russia 55°45′21″N 37°37′04″E
Result	See § Aftermath
Territorial changes	Truce of Deulino (Note: The Poles could not take Moscow, Although the Russians won directly near Moscow, they refused to return Smolensk and Chernihiv.)

Belligerents
Polish–Lithuanian Commonwealth; Zaporozhian Cossacks	Russia; Don Cossacks; Tatars

Commanders and leaders
King Wladyslaw IV Vasa; Grand Hetman Jan Karol Chodkiewicz; Hetman Petro Konashevych-Sahaidachny; Bartłomiej Nowodworski (WIA)	Tsar Michael I of Russia

Strength
8,000 Poles and Lithuanians; 18,000 Zaporozhian Cossacks	11,500 men: 1,350 nobles 1,000 Streltsy; 2,600 Don Cossacks; 5,500 militia 300 Foreign mercenaries (including Jacob Shaw's Regiment); 450 Tatars

Casualties and losses
Light	Light
- Location within European Russia

The siege of Moscow was the last major military action of Władysław IV Vasa's campaign of 1617–1618 and the entire Polish–Russian War of 1609–1618. During the short siege, which lasted several weeks in the autumn of 1618, an assault of the city was unsuccessful. Having failed, the Polish-Lithuanian government went to the conclusion of the Truce of Deulino.

== Background ==
The campaign was presented as an action by the "legitimate" Tsar Wladyslaw Vasa against the "usurper" Michael Romanov. The Crown forces led by Wladyslaw (6,000 men) and Lithuanian forces under the command of the Great Hetman Jan Karol Chodkiewicz (6,500 men) took part in the campaign. Wladyslaw started from Warsaw on April 5, 1617, but only in September arrived in Smolensk. The Russian government pulled all available forces into the western direction, and in the Mozhaysk area, the Poles were given serious resistance. The Battle of Mozhaysk lasted all summer of 1618. Despite the fact that Russian troops eventually had to retreat, the Polish-Lithuanian army lost time, and was severely weakened as the gentry left the camp en masse due to non-payment of salaries. On October 2, the Polish-Lithuanian army of about 8,000 approached Moscow and settled in Tushino, on the site of the former impostor's camp. They were reinforced by 18,000 Zaporozhian Cossacks, led by Hetman Petro Konashevych-Sahaidachny, who easily advanced from the southwest to Moscow, along the way capturing a number of small fortresses.

== Siege ==
According to the military register books, the Moscow garrison numbered only about 11,500 people. Of these, about 5,500 people were a militia gathered throughout Moscow, about a half of them armed with firearms. Even less reliable defenders were the Cossacks (about 1,450 horse and 1,150 foot). In addition to low fighting spirit, there was a threat of direct betrayal. As the most reliable defense of Moscow were service people (about 450 Moscow nobles and up to 900 provincial gentry and boyar children) and streltsy of four Moscow orders (up to 1,500 men). In addition to them, the garrison included about 300 foreign mercenaries (including Irish and Scottisch mercenaries from Jacob Shaw's Regiment) and 450 Tatars.

During the night of October 10, a general assault was carried out. The main Polish-Lithuanian forces attacked the Arbat gate (2,700 men) and Tver gate (2,300 men). The gate attack scheme was identical: infantry fire was to cause the defenders to leave the walls, while the engineers destroy the gates with petards. Despite the huge numerical superiority of the Cossacks, they had an auxiliary role. Hussar banners, in contrast to the events of 1612, Chodkiewicz left in reserve.

Shortly before the storm began, two French engineers ran over to the Russian side, delivering Polish plans to the defenders. As might be expected, the assault forces immediately encountered prepared and stubborn resistance. The attack of the Tver Gate was stopped immediately: the fire of Russian infantry from the walls of the White City scattered the enemy ranks. The walls of the fortress were too high for assault ladders. A huge mass of Cossacks did not dare to engage in battle. At the Arbat Gate, Poles breached the wooden fortifications and pressed into the city. They were stopped by a detachment of foreign mercenaries. Around them rallied the other soldiers, and in the evening the Poles were pushed out of the fortification.

== Aftermath ==
The failure of the assault meant the collapse of the hopes of the Polish–Lithuanian Commonwealth government to occupy the Russian throne with a Polish protege. Nevertheless, the position of the Russian government was extremely difficult. Commonwealth troops kept dozens of towns and fortresses and continued to threaten the capital and major centers (Yaroslavl and Kaluga). The Battle of Mozhaysk demonstrated that the Russian army could not reverse the course of the war in their favor. This forced the Russian government to accept the difficult conditions of the Truce of Deulino.
