= Bāžciems =

Neighbourhood of Jūrmala, Latvia

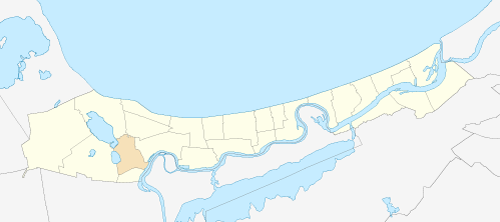
- Location in Jūrmala

- Location in Latvia
- Coordinates: 56°56′N 23°36′E
- Country: Latvia
- City: Jūrmala

Area
  - Total: 3.6 km^{2} (1.4 sq mi)
- Elevation: 3 m (9.8 ft)

Population (2008)
  - Total: 9
  - Density: 2.5/km^{2} (6.5/sq mi)

Bāžciems is a residential area and neighbourhood of the city Jūrmala, Latvia.

== History ==
The Bāžciems or Bāžnieki (German: Bahseneck), belonging to the Duke of Courland, Sloka manor, formed the boundary of the Slokas town, marked by the Vecslocenes River with mills. During the Polish-Swedish War in 1605-1608 Swedes erected fortifications here. In the period of Kurzeme's economic prosperity, the Duke Jacob Kettler wanted to create a rival export port in Riga at Sloka, where glass factories and copper smelting were established. He ordered the construction of a canal linking the Slokas port to the Lielupe with the Baltic Sea through the present River Vecslocene and the Slokas lake.

In 1783, Slokas Manor was separated from the Sloka region from the Duchy of Courland and Zemgale and added to the Russian Empire. The village in 1795 had 159 inhabitants - 82 men and 77 women.

In 1925, the village was added to the town of Slokas. Slokas together with Bačciems was included in the city of Jurmala in 1959.
