= Battle of Weissenstein =

1604 military conflict in Estonia during Polish-Swedish War

- Part of the Polish–Swedish War (1600–1611)
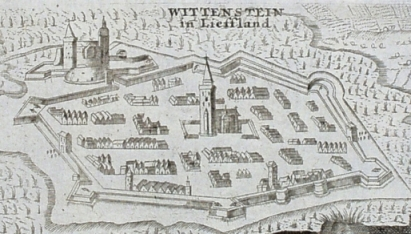
- Engraving of Weissenstein and it's castle
Date	September 25, 1604
Location	Weissenstein, modern-day Estonia 58°53′21″N 25°34′19″E
Result	Polish-Lithuanian victory

Belligerents
Sweden	Polish–Lithuanian Commonwealth

Commanders and leaders
Arvid Stålarm; Alonzo Cacho de Canut †	Jan Karol Chodkiewicz

Strength
5,000 men 6 cannons	2,300 men

Casualties and losses
3,000 killed, wounded or captured 6 cannons 26 banners	50 killed 100 wounded

The Battle of Weissenstein, or Battle of Biały Kamień, was fought during the Polish–Swedish War (1600–1611), between Sweden and the Polish–Lithuanian Commonwealth on 25 September 1604. The Swedish army was commanded by Arvid Stålarm and the Polish army under Jan Karol Chodkiewicz. The battle ended with a victory for Poland, which had sent a relief party against the Swedish forces besieging Weissenstein castle, modern day Paide in Estonia.

== History ==
The Swedish army arrived in Estonia in the summer with 6000 troops led by Arvid Stålarm and Spanish mercenary Alonzo Cacho de Canut, and besieged Weissenstein on September 15, 1604. The first Swedish assault was repulsed by fortress crew. Jan Karol Chodkiewicz with 2300 soldiers came up to the rescue on September 25. The battlefield was located between the road from Dorpat to Reval, with marshy streams in the east, west, and south. Weissenstein was located nearby in the marshy valley west of the battlefield.

Seeing the approaching Polish–Lithuanian army, Alonzo de Canut proposed setting loose formation in Spanish style. However, Stålarm, keeping in mind that in previous battles had Poles and Lithuanians at first chased away Swedish cavalry, then cut down infantry, decided to mix infantry and cavalry. The left, stronger Swedish flank, made up of German mercenaries led by de Canut, was based on a narrow causeway and the road leading to Reval. The right flank, composed of the Finns, was weaker but protected with marshy streams. The center, led by Stålarm, consisted solely of Swedish troops. Chodkiewicz, after the analysis of the enemy formation, decided to attack the left Swedish flank, because he believed that the Swedish commander did not expect such a move. Therefore, on the right flank of the Polish Army stood hussars, light cavalry were on the left flank, and the center was composed of infantry, reiters, and artillery.

Before the Swedes were able to discern the Polish intentions, Chodkiewicz's hussars struck the Germans, breaking the German reiters. Fierce resistance put infantry commanded by Canut. However, when Canut was killed, the left flank was destroyed. After the destruction of the left wing of the Swedish army, Chodkiewicz rushed to attack the right wing and center. When they joined the hussars, the Swedish army was pushed to the swamp. The battle ended with the total defeat of the army led by Stålarm. The Swedes lost 3,000 soldiers, 6 guns, all equipment, and 26 standards (5 of them have been destroyed), while the Poles and Lithuanians lost 50 killed and 100 wounded.
