= Salacgrīva Port =

Port in Latvia

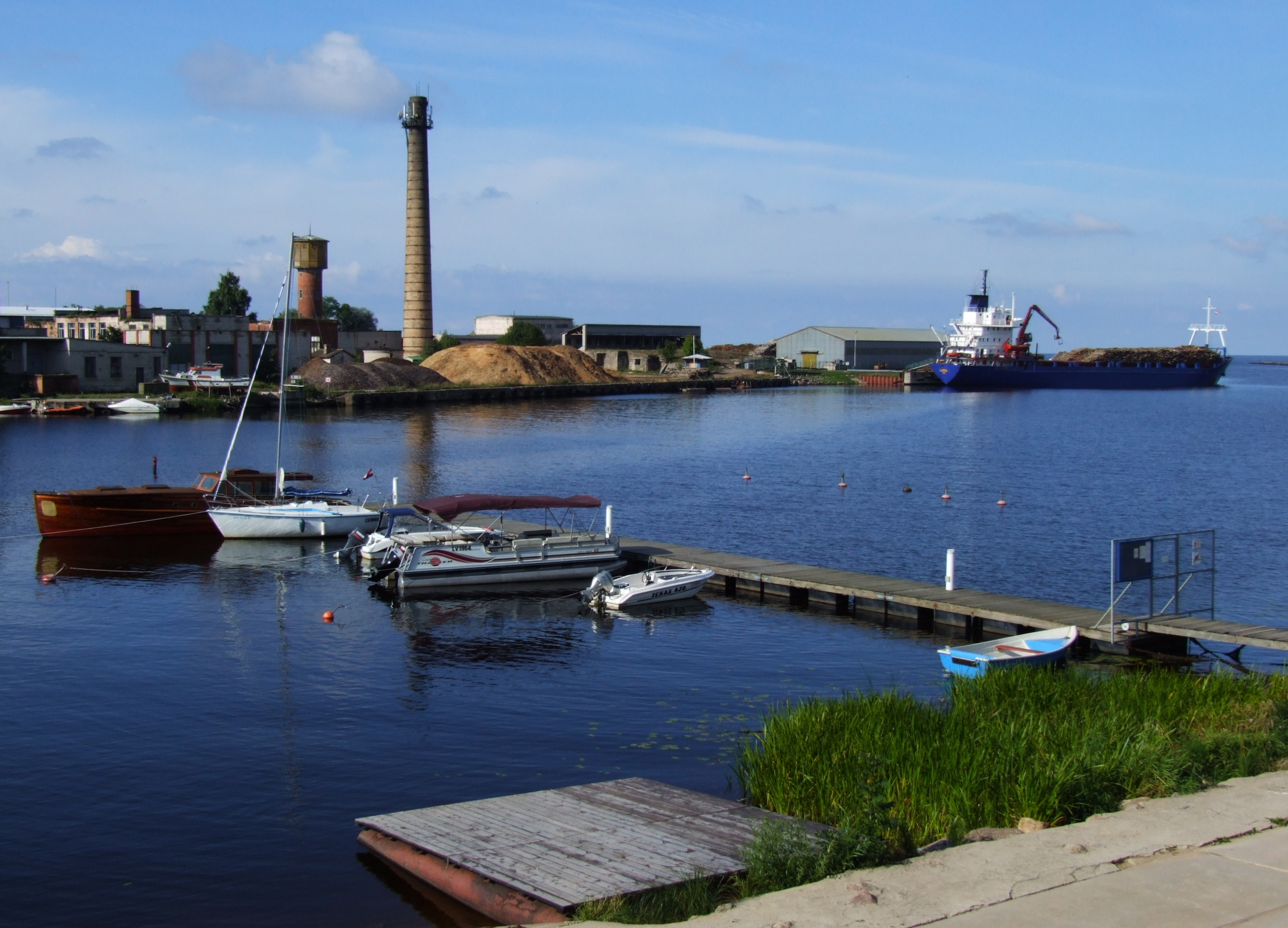
- Port in Salacgrīva

- Location in Latvia

Location
- Country: Latvia
- Coordinates: 57°45′19″N 24°20′58″E

Statistics
- Website; Official website

Salacgrīva Port (Latvian: Salacgrīva osta) is the port authority of Salacgrīva, Latvia. The port is located at the mouth of Salaca River.

== See also ==
- Battle of Salis
