= Prince Władysław's March on Moscow =

Military conflict (1617–1618)

- Part of Polish–Muscovite War (1609–1618)
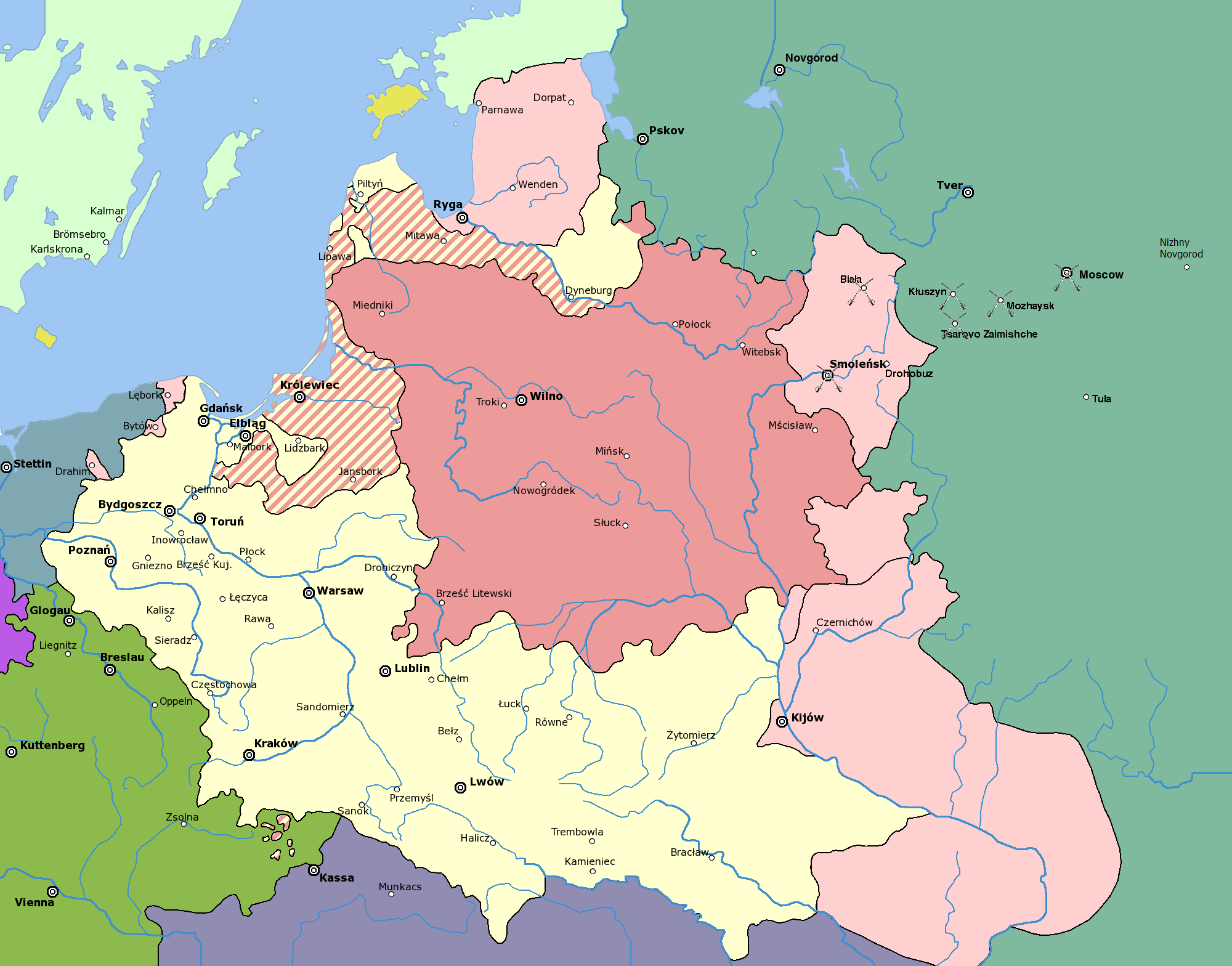
- Map of military operations. Important battles are marked with crossed swords.
Date	1617–1618
Location	Tsardom of Russia
Result	Truce of Deulino

Belligerents
Polish-Lithuanian Commonwealth; Zaporozhian Cossacks	Tsardom of Russia

Commanders and leaders
Władysław IV Vasa; Jan Karol Chodkiewicz; Petro Sahaidachny	Grigory Volkonsky; Dmitry Pozharsky

Prince Władysław's March on Moscow was a military conflict between the Polish-Lithuanian Commonwealth and the Tsardom of Russia, which lasted from 1617 to 1618. The war ended with the signing of the Truce of Deulino. It is considered the final stage of the Polish–Russian War (1609–1618).

== Background ==
In the Time of Troubles, the boyars, frightened by the peasant-Cossack revolts, called on the Poles. According to the treaty of February 4, 1610, signed near Smolensk by King Sigismund III and the Muscovite embassy, prince Władysław IV, after accepting Orthodoxy, was to take the throne of Russia. After the overthrow of Vasily Shuisky in the summer of 1610, the Seven Boyars recognized Władysław as tsar and even began minting coins on behalf of Władysław Zygymontovich. However, Władysław did not accept Orthodoxy, did not come to Moscow and was not crowned king.

In October 1612, the boyar government of King Władysław was overthrown in Moscow. On February 21, 1613, Mikhail Romanov was elected Tsar of Russia by the Zemsky Sobor.

At the same time Władysław did not give up his rights to the Russian throne. His Moscow campaign was inspired by a deep raid into Muscovy by Aleksander Józef Lisowski in 1615, who easily moved past Moscow with a small detachment of Lisowczyks – from Bryansk and Oryol to Kostroma and Murom – and returned to Poland. In the summer of 1616, the Sejm supported the decision to conduct a two-year military campaign against the Tsardom of Russia with 10,000 mercenaries. Jan Karol Chodkiewicz was appointed the military leader of the campaign.

== Start of the campaign ==
On April 6, 1617, prince Władysław set out from Warsaw on a march to Moscow in order to obtain the crown of the Tsar of Russia. By the end of September the prince's army joined forces with Jan Karol Chodkiewicz's army near Smolensk. On October 11, a combined Polish-Lithuanian army of about 8,000 men captured Dorogobuzh without a fight. Soon, on October 18, Vyazma was just as easily captured. By the end of 1617, Polish units managed to conquer Meshchovsk, Kozelsk, Serpeysk, and Roslavl. In December 1617, hostilities ceased, and most of the Polish-Lithuanian army encamped near Vyazma, awaiting reinforcements. However, neither soldiers nor money were received. Therefore, in spring a large number of soldiers left the camp and the army was reduced to five thousand people.

== Joining of the troops of Sahaidachny ==
To save the prince and rectify the situation, the Polish government turned to the Zaporozhian Cossacks for help. In March 1618, twelve Zaporozhian centurions met with King Władysław and promised to bring him an army of 20,000. Preparations for the Moscow campaign were discussed at two general councils in June 1618. During these negotiations, the Cossacks, in particular, demanded an end to the persecution of the Orthodox population.

After the negotiations, the Zaporozhian Cossacks command under the leadership of hetman Petro Sahaidachny developed a plan for the future campaign.

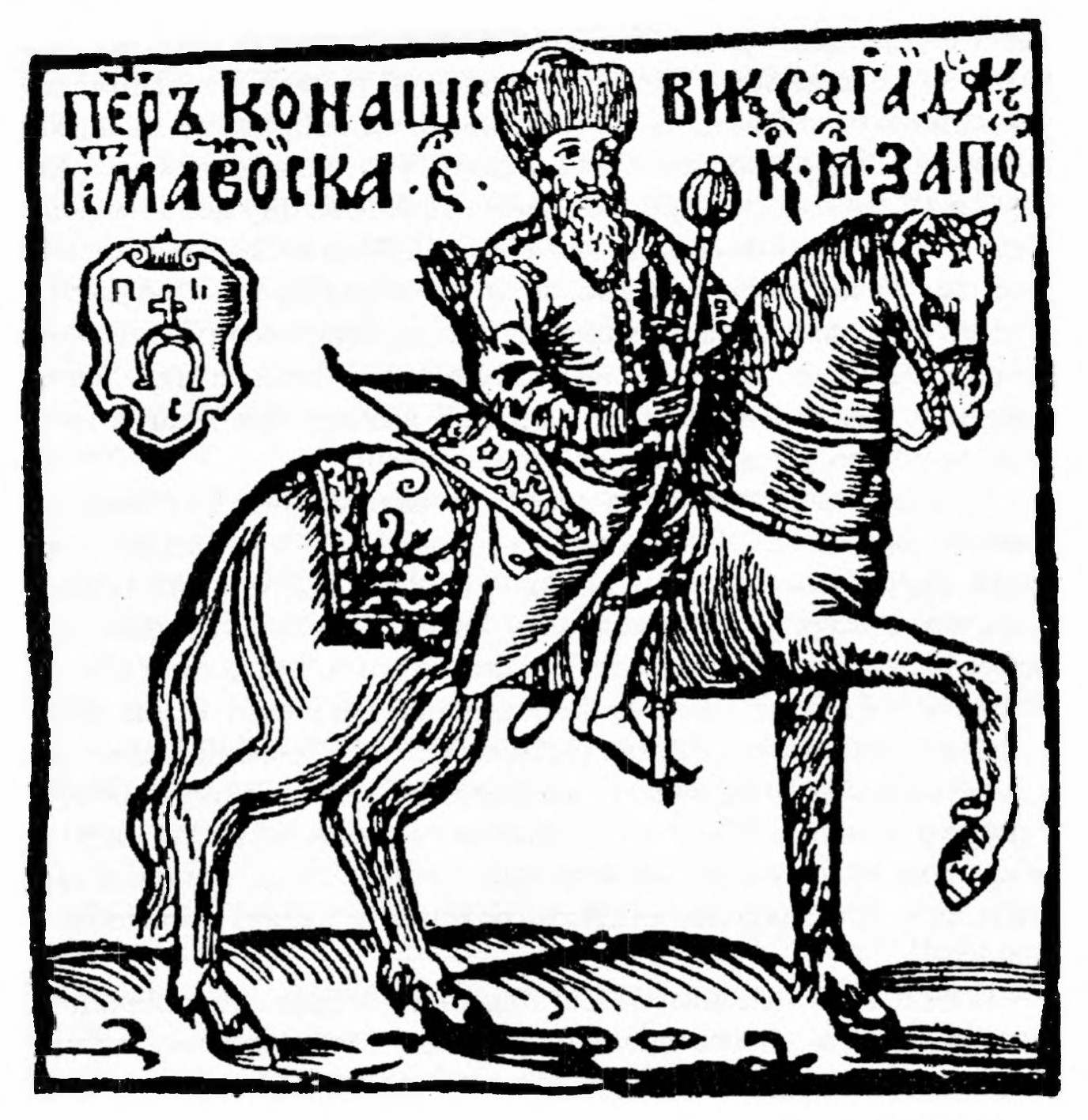
Petro Sahaidachny. Engraving 1622.

In the second half of June, 6 regiments of 20,000 Cossack troops led by Sahaidachny went to Moscow. The Cossacks took 17 small-caliber guns with them and left all the rest of the artillery in Kyiv, so as not to slow themselves down. After crossing the Dnieper, Sahaidachny's army set out on the Muravsky Trail, which led from the Crimea in the direction of Tula along the Dnieper coast.

On July 7, the Cossacks approached one of the most fortified cities in southern Muscovy – Livny. As a result of an unexpected attack, the Cossacks seized the city. After capturing the city, the Cossacks settled in this position, and on July 10 continued their journey. On July 16, they approached Yelets, a well-fortified fortress located several tens of kilometers northeast of Livny.

The Cossacks cunningly lured Muscovite regiments out of the city, and stormed the fortress with the remnants of the Moscow army on the next night. After three attacks, they stormed the walls and captured the fortress. Yelets priests asked the Cossacks not to destroy the city, promising in return to extradite the tsar's envoy S. Khrushchev together with the "treasury" – 30 thousand rubles of the royal treasury, intended to bribe the Crimean khan. The Cossacks accepted the surrender and sent a small detachment for arrests and requisition.

In late July and early August, Sahaidachny sent colonel Mykhailo Doroshenko, leading a 10,000-strong detachment, to raid the Ryazan region. His troops managed to capture the cities of Lebedyan, Skopin, Dankov, Ryazhsk. In early August, this detachment burned the posad of Pereyaslavl-Ryazan. On their return to Sahaidachny's troops, Pesochnia, Sapozhok, and Shatsk were captured.

Having joined forces and determined through the envoys the meeting place of the Polish and Cossacks troops in Tushino, Sahaidachny continued his campaign. A detachment led by сolonel Milosny, consisting of 1,000 cavalry, was sent to a well-fortified fortress - Mikhailov. However, under Mikhailov the Cossacks suffered their first failure. They were to capture the city on the night of August 21, but due to bad weather they only reached the city on August 22. During this time, reinforcements came to the city, and the plan of a sudden attack had failed. Sahaidachny and his main army arrived at the fortress on August 26 and were forced switch to the usual siege. After two attempts to storm the city on September 7, Sahaidachny was forced to abandon the siege in order to catch up with King Władysław near Moscow.

After the unsuccessful siege of Mikhailov, Petro Sahaidachny sent about 2,000 Cossacks under the leadership of Fedir Boryspilets to the nearby approaches of Moscow from the south – to Meshchera Lowlands. One of the tasks of this maneuver was to divert the enemy's attention from the planned forcing of Oka north of Mikhailov by the main Cossack army. Cossack detachments captured the towns of Kasimov, Kazar, and Romanov.

To confront the Cossacks, tsar Mikhail Romanov sent an army of 7,000 under the leadership of Dmitry Pozharsky and prince Grigoriy Volkonskiy. This army had to prevent the Cossacks from crossing the Oka River and stop their advance onto Moscow. However, during the campaign, Dmitry Pozharsky fell ill, and voivode G. Volkonskiy took over the leadership of the tsar's army. He tried to prevent the hetman from crossing Oka near Kolomna. Hetman decided to go with the main forces to the well-fortified fortress of Zaraysk. The first fights near Zaraysk took place on September 11, when the vanguard of the Cossacks defeated a detachment of Moscow soldiers and the Cossacks even managed to break into the city jail. However, these forces were not enough to consolidate success, and Zaraysk persevered.

On September 12, Petro Sahaidachny received a letter from prince Władysław notifying that he was leaving Mozhaisk for Moscow, and ordered the hetman to immediately head for the Simon's Monastery. The next day, a Cossack council was gathered, where it was decided to begin a raid on Moscow on September 14, without waiting for Fedir Boryspolets' return. The Cossacks also decided not to seize Kashira and focus on preparing for the crossing near Zaraysk. On September 15–16, the Cossacks laid siege to Zaraysk, while concentrating the troops near the confluence of Osyotr and Oka rivers and preparing for the crossing.

On September 15, tsar Mikhail Romanov ordered G. Volkonsky not to allow Sahaidachny's army to cross the Oka by any means. On September 16, the first 400 of Cossack infantry boarded the boats to cross. Meanwhile, G. Volkonsky and his army went to the landing site to obstruct the crossing. However, by the end of the day, about a thousand Cossacks landed above and below the place where the army of the Moscow voivode stood. Upon learning of this, Volkonsky hastily began to retreat to Kolomna. His army was struck by desertion, and detachments of Muscovite Cossacks and Astrakhan Tatars fled from it. Affected by this, Volkonsky decided to leave Kolomna with the army and hurried to the village of Gzhel, 65 km from Kolomna. Over the next few days, without encountering resistance from the demoralized Moscow army, Sahaidachny crossed the Oka with minimal losses.

Shortly afterwards, Cossack troops encamped near Cherkizov, from where on September 24 the envoys, Colonels Mykhailo Doroshenko and Bohdan Konsha, were sent by Sahaidachny to determine the exact time and place of his arrival near Moscow. On September 28, the ambassadors arrived in Zvenigorod and it was agreed with the Polish-Lithuanian command that a reunion of troops would take place on October 3 in the village of Tushino. To secure the rear of his army, Sahaidachny organized a series of attacks on Muscovite troops stationed near Kolomna, while on October 3 F. Pirsky's regiment attacked the city itself, and the Cossacks even stormed the posad. On October 6, the army led by P. Sahaidachny set out on the Kashira route towards Moscow. In the area of the Donskiy Monastery, the Moscow army led by Vasiliy Buturlin blocked their way. The tsar sent 6,000 horsemen against Sahaidachny, all available Moscow reserves. During the battle, the Cossacks destroyed the front lines of the enemy, and the rest of the Muscovite cavalry began to flee.

== The siege of Moscow ==
Sahaidachny's intentions towards Moscow were very strong, as evidenced by his letter to prince Władysław, which was sent after September 24. In the letter, the hetman wrote: "May the Lord God Almighty be bringer of good fortune and blessing in achieving this plan to appoint the honor of the kingdom to your royal mercy, and that the people stubborn at the feet of his majesty were subdued.".

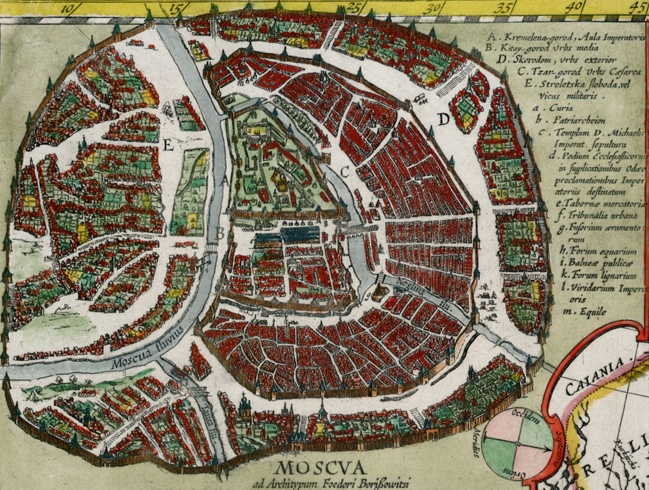
Map of Moscow from the atlas of Willem Blaeu, 1613.

On October 8, near Tushino, the Cossacks joined forces with prince Władysław. As a gift, the Cossacks presented the prince with the voivode of Livny and Yelets, tsarist ambassadors and captured Tatars. On the eve of Sahaidachny's arrival, Lithuanian hetman Jan Karol Chodkiewicz devised a plan to capture Moscow. This plan was to storm the capital from several sides at the same time, with the main strikes near the Arbat and Tver gates. The main attacking force was Polish troops and mercenaries. The Cossack army was divided into several parts, some of them went to storm the fort from the Moskva river, the rest had to act as a reserve and distract the tsarist troops from the main directions.

On October 11, the army of prince Władysław and the Cossacks of Peter Sahaidachny launched an attack on Moscow. The assault lasted for several hours from 3 AM and until dawn. The attackers managed to break into the city from the Arbat Gate's side, but the attack stopped without proper support. Seeing no possibility of continuing the attack, the Polish units retreated from the city with small losses.

== End of the war: Truce of Deulino ==
The difficult military situation forced the Moscow authorities to go into negotiations, which first took place on October 31 near the Tver Gate. During November, long negotiations took place between the Polish and Muscovite ambassadors. Each side expected its opponent to be exhausted sooner. Meanwhile, some Cossack detachments continued to attack the cities north and northwest of Moscow, ravaging Yaroslavl and Vologda counties, thereby undermining the economic resources of Muscovites.

At the end of October, P. Sahaidachny sent an 8,000-strong army south of Moscow to the lands adjacent to the left bank of the Oka river. The main purpose of this raid was to capture Kaluga – a strategically important city with a well-fortified fortress. Serpukhov was the first notable settlement on the way. On November 3, the Cossack regiments under the command of colonels Yemets, Pyrskyi, Mylosnyi, and B. Konsha stormed the city, and within hours the Cossacks took the posad. After that the units moved to join the regiment of P. Sahaidachny near Kaluga. On the night of December 3–4, 1618, an army under the command of P. Sahaidachny started the onslaught. As a result of a quick attack, the Cossacks seized the posad, forcing the city garrison under the leadership of voivode M. Gagarin to refuge to the city citadel. The siege lasted until the signing of the Polish-Moscow truce.

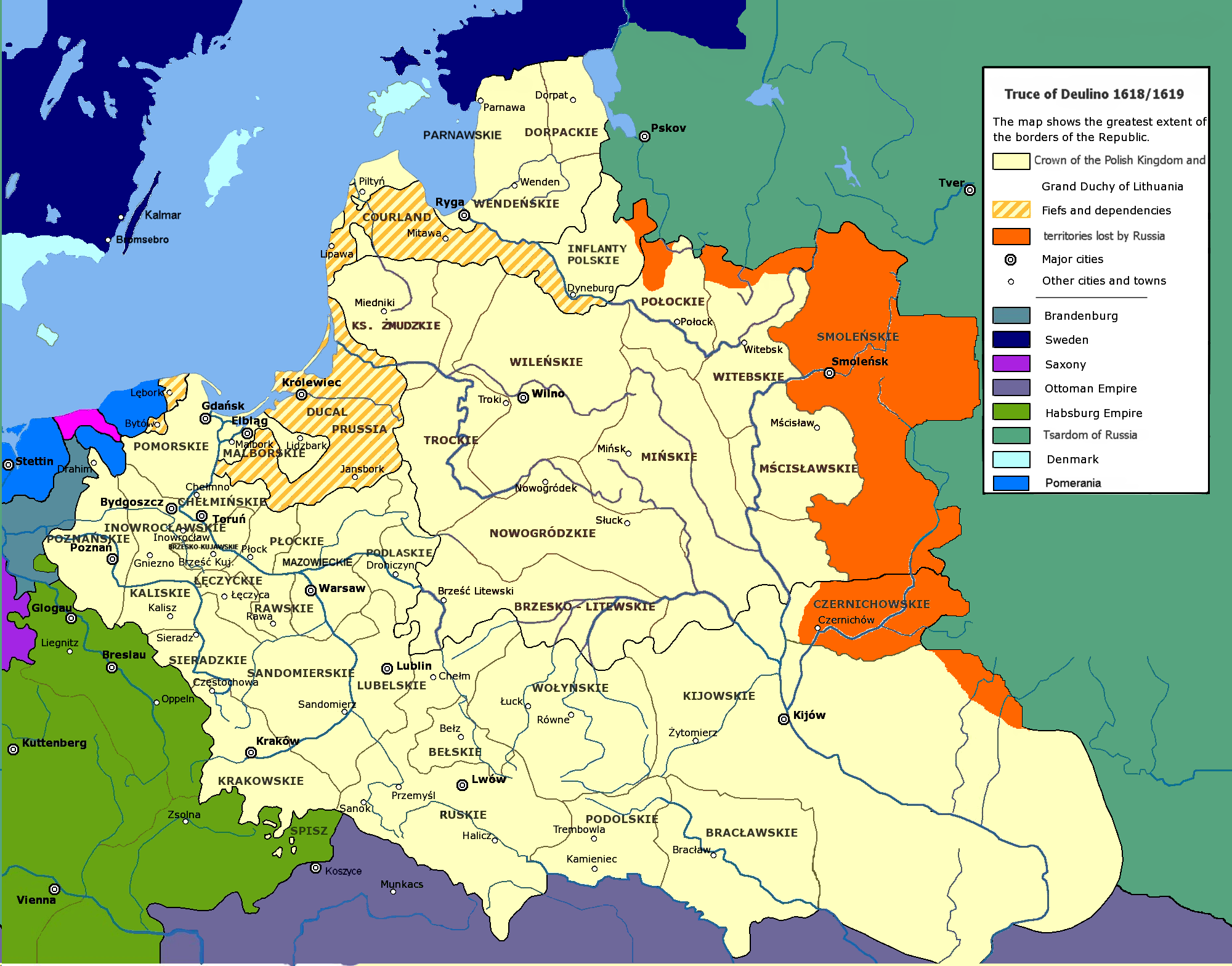
The territories ceded to the Polish-Lithuanian Commonwealth in accordance with the Truce of Deulino are highlighted in orange

Konashevych-Sahaidachny's raid on Kaluga came as a shock to the Russian authorities. Assessing these events, Jan III Sobieski pointed out that it was because of this raid that the Muscovites were horrified and the Cossacks "persuaded their commissars to negotiate as soon as possible." The resumption of negotiations took place on December 3 in the village of Deulino near the Trinity Lavra of St. Sergius. Theparties reached a joint decision after three rounds of negotiations, and on December 11, 1618, the so-called Truce of Deulino was concluded. The Truce of Deulino was the greatest success of the Polish-Lithuanian Commonwealth in its confrontation with the Moscow state. Poland gained control over Belarusian and Ukrainian lands, which were previously under the rule of Moscow: Smolensk, Chernihiv and Novhorod-Siverskyi – 29 cities overall. The Polish king officially retained the right to claim the throne of Moscow. On the other hand, this armistice marked the end of a 15-year period of ongoing wars in the Muscovy. At the end of December, the Cossack council decided to cease hostilities and return to Ukraine. The army was divided into two parts, following a parallel path. Most of them, under the leadership of Sahaidachny, moved along the left bank of the Oka river in the direction of Peremyshl (Kaluga), Belyov, Bolkhov, and then to Kyiv. A smaller part, under the command of F. Pyrskyi, went along the right bank of the Oka River in the direction of Odoyev, Kursk, and then to Kyiv. In a few weeks, Sahaidachny's army was already in Ukraine, assisted by the Moscow authorities, who were providing supplies and provisions.

After returning to Ukraine, Sahaidachny's army stationed in Kyiv Voivodeship, and the hetman's regiment located in Kyiv itself. For their participation in the Moscow campaign, the Cossacks received a monetary reward of 20,000 gold and 7,000 pieces of cloth. According to D. Yavornytsky, upon his arrival in Kyiv, Petro Sahaidachny accepted the title of "Hetman of Ukraine" and started to rule that part of it that recognized itself as Cossack.

== See also ==
- Polish–Russian War (1609–1618)
- Siege of Kaluga (1617–1618)
