= Profiles in Folly =

- Front cover of Profiles In Folly
- Author: Alan Axelrod
- Language: English
- Genre: Historical
- Publisher: Sterling Publishing (Adult)
- Publication date: May 6, 2008
- Publication place: United States
- Media type: Print (Hardcover)
- Pages: 358
- ISBN: 1-4027-4768-3
- OCLC: 173809076
- Dewey Decimal: 909 22
- LC Class: D21.3 .A84 2008
- Preceded by: Profiles In Audacity

Profiles in Folly is a historical book written by Alan Axelrod that is composed of many true stories, beginning with the Trojan War in "The Decision To Let Danger In", and ending with Hurricane Katrina in "The Decision to Stop Short of Leadership". It is a follow-up book to Profiles in Audacity, and studies 35 of the worst mistakes in history. Each mistake is told in story form and is designed to teach the reader lessons through Axelrod's opinion.

== Division of the book ==
The book is separated into six main parts, all focusing on different decisions leaders made in their actions of folly. These decisions are:

- The Decision to Gamble and Hope
- The Decision to Manipulate
- The Decision to Leap (Without Looking)
- The Decision to Retreat
- The Decision to Destroy
- and The Decision to Drift.

Within each of these decisions are short, historical stories such as "John F. Kennedy and the Bay of Pigs" under The Decision to Drift, or "The British Empire and Gandhi" under The Decision to Retreat. There are a total of thirty-five mini stories within the entire book.

The book focuses on mainly contemporary stories, but goes as far back as to the Trojan War (the very first story) under The Decision to Gamble and Hope.
