= Battle of Rakvere (1603) =

1603 military conflict in Estonia during Polish-Swedish War

- Part of the Polish–Swedish War (1600–1611)
- Hetman Jan Karol Chodkiewicz
| Date | 5 March 1603 |
| Location | Rakvere, modern-day Estonia 59°21′N 26°21′E |
| Result | Polish–Lithuanian victory |

Belligerents
| Sweden | Polish–Lithuanian Commonwealth |

Commanders and leaders
| Anders Lennartsson | Jan Karol Chodkiewicz |

Casualties and losses
| 170 killed | 1 killed and 2 wounded |

The Battle of Rakvere took place on 5 March 1603 during the Polish–Swedish War (1600–1611). In December, 1602, the siege of Dorpat commenced. On 5 March 1603 at Rakvere with 1,000 men Jan Chodkiewicz defeated the Swedish relief force of 2,000 and on 13 April Dorpat capitulated. In the battle the Lithuanians lost only one soldier, and two were wounded. The Swedes lost 70 Germans mercenaries and 100 Estonian peasants.
