= Battle of Salis =

1609 battle

- Part of the Polish–Swedish War (1600–11)
Date	March 23–24, 1609
Location	Salis, Swedish Latvia 57°45′19″N 24°20′58″E
Result	Polish-Lithuanian victory

Belligerents
Poland-Lithuania; Samogitia	Sweden

Commanders and leaders
Jan Chodkeiwicz	Frederick Mansfeld

Strength
2 warships 5 armed merchantmen 4 fire ships	8 warships 6 support vessels

Casualties and losses
4 fireships destroyed	2 warships destroyed

The Battle of Salis took place during the Polish–Swedish War (1600–1611) during the night of March 23–24, 1609. After the capture of Pärnu, Jan Karol Chodkiewicz, commander of the Lithuanian army, moved towards Riga, which was besieged by the Swedes under the command of Joachim Frederick von Mansfeld. Along the way, Chodkiewicz saw a chance to destroy the Swedish squadron based in the Salis port which blocked Riga. The dominant presence of the Swedes in the Baltic region gave the Lithuanian army the upper hand, as von Mansfeld and the Swedish army did not expect the possibility of an attack in such a heavily Swedish-occupied region.

Chodkiewicz's army consisted of two ships obtained in Pärnu, filled with Samogitian infantry and armed with cannons brought in from the Pärnu Castle. The squadron was additionally reinforced by a few hastily armed merchant ships (probably five) purchased from the English and Dutch, and a couple of boats and bateaux. To assist in managing vessel traffic, Chodkiewicz hired a few sailors, mainly Livonians.

On the night of March 23, Chodkiewicz's army (consisting of Samogitians, Livonians, and probably some bribed members of the Swedish infantry) surprise-attacked the Swedish Fleet. Using the favourable winds blowing inland, Chodkiewicz sent several (probably four) fire ships (their first use in the Baltic in modern times) into the port, setting several ships on fire and pushing them in the direction of the Swedish warships anchored in formation.

Unprepared for the attack, the Swedish attempted to save their ships by cutting their anchor ropes and to flee. Despite this, two Swedish ships were burned and soon sank. Retreating from the port, the Swedish unit came under fire by the Samogitian ships waiting at the roadstead. The Swedish squadron did not attempt to engage in an artillery fight and immediately escaped to the waters of the Gulf of Riga. Samogitian units, slower than the Swedish ships, did not attempt to pursue them. The entire port of Salis, together with stocks of weapons, ammunition and food, fell into the hands of the Samogitians. The victory of Pärnu and Salis had a direct impact on the further course of the war and contributed to halting the Swedish assault on Riga.
