= Jan Karol Chodkiewicz =

Polish–Lithuanian military leader (c. 1561 – 1621)

Grand Hetman of Lithuania Jan Karol Chodkiewicz
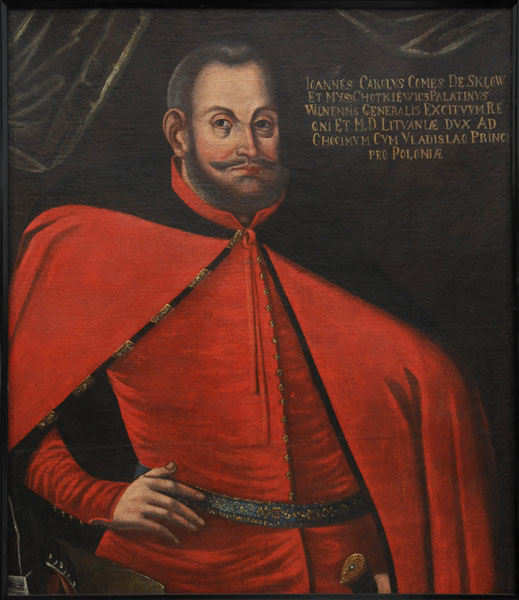
- Chodkiewicz wearing a traditional costume of Polish–Lithuanian magnates
- Coat of arms: Chodkiewicz coat of arms
- Born: c. 1561; Vilnius, Grand Duchy of Lithuania
- Died: 24 September 1621; Khotyn Castle, Polish–Lithuanian Commonwealth
- Noble family: Chodkiewicz
- Spouses: Zofia Mielecka; Anna Alojza Ostrogska
- Issue: Hieronim Chodkiewicz; Anna Scholastyka Chodkiewicz
- Father: Jan Hieronimowicz Chodkiewicz
- Mother: Krystyna Zborowska
- Military career
- Allegiance: Poland–Lithuania
- Branch: Military of the Polish–Lithuanian Commonwealth
- Conflicts: List: Polish–Swedish War (1600–1611); Battle of Kokenhausen; Battle of Rakvere; Battle of Weissenstein; Battle of Kircholm; Siege of Pärnu; Battle of Salis; Battle of Daugavgrīva; Zebrzydowski rebellion; Battle of Guzów; Polish–Russian War (1609–1618); Battle of Moscow (1612); Mozhaysk operation; Siege of Moscow (1618); Polish–Ottoman War (1620–1621); Battle of Khotyn

Jan Karol Chodkiewicz (Lithuanian: Jonas Karolis Chodkevičius; c. 1561 – 24 September 1621) was a Polish–Lithuanian military commander of the Grand Ducal Lithuanian Army, who was from 1601 Field Hetman of Lithuania, and from 1605 Grand Hetman of Lithuania. He was one of the most prominent noblemen and military commanders of the Polish–Lithuanian Commonwealth of his era. His coat of arms was Chodkiewicz, as was his family name.

He played a major role, often as the top commander of the military of the Polish-Lithuanian Commonwealth, in the Wallachian campaign of 1599–1601, the Polish–Swedish War of 1600–11, the Polish–Muscovite War of 1605–18, and the Polish–Ottoman War of 1620–1621. His most famous victory was the Battle of Kircholm in 1605, in which he dealt a major defeat to a Swedish army three times the size of his own. He died on the front lines during the battle of Khotyn, in the besieged Khotyn Fortress, a few days before the Ottomans gave up on the siege and agreed to negotiate.

== Biography ==
=== Early life ===
Chodkiewicz was born around 1561 (the exact date of his birth is unknown) as the son of Jan Hieronimowicz Chodkiewicz, Grand Marshal of Lithuania, castellan of Vilnius and Krystyna Zborowska, daughter of a Polish magnate family of Zborowski. From 1573 he was a student at the Vilnius Jesuit College and the Vilnius University, and from 1586 to 1589, together with his brother Aleksander, he continued his studies abroad at the University of Ingolstadt. He visited Padua before returning to the Polish–Lithuanian Commonwealth in 1590.

He started his military career soon after returning to the Commonwealth, raising a rota of 50 to 100 men. He gained military experience in the fight against the rebellious Cossacks during the Severyn Nalyvaiko's uprising under Field Crown Hetman Stanisław Żółkiewski. During that conflict he participated in the battle of Kaniów on 14 April 1596, and in the siege of the Cossack tabor near Lubny. In 1599, he was appointed the Elder (starost) of Samogitia.

Chodkiewicz subsequently assisted Chancellor and Great Crown Hetman Jan Zamoyski in his victorious Wallachian campaign, in which Chodkiewicz participated in the battle of Ploiești on 15 October 1600. For that campaign, he was given that year the high office of the Field Lithuanian Hetman, the second commander-in-chief of the Grand Ducal Lithuanian Army.

=== War in the North ===
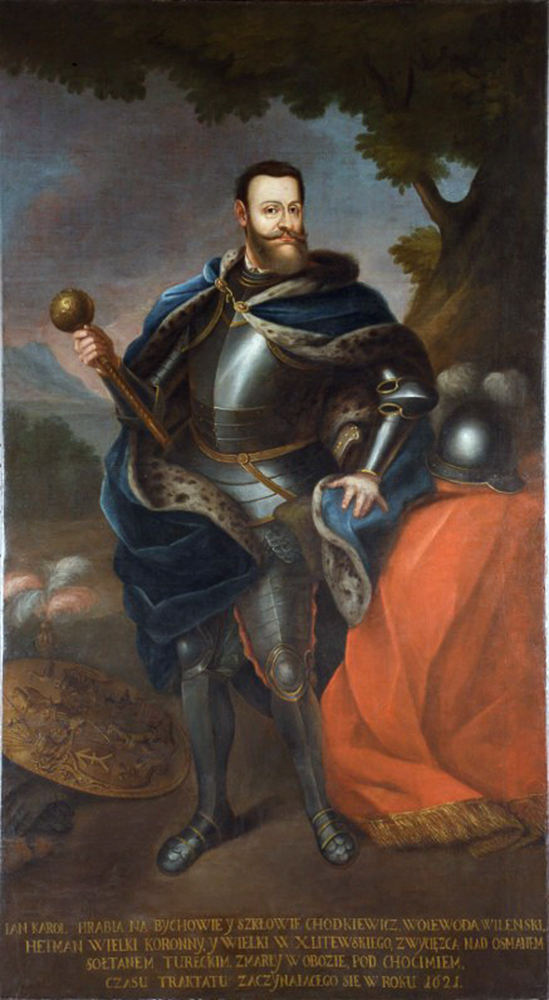
Grand Hetman Chodkiewicz

A year later, in 1601, Chodkiewicz accompanied Zamoyski north, to the Duchy of Livonia (Inflanty), where he commanded Lithuanian units on the right wing of the Commonwealth army in a victorious battle of Kokenhausen in late July that year in the war against Sweden. He oversaw the fighting in the Livonia theater after Zamoyski's return to Poland in 1602. In April 1603, he captured Dorpat (modern Tartu) and defeated the Swedish forces at the Battle of Weissenstein on 23 September 1604. His crowning achievement was the great victory near the Daugava in the Battle of Kircholm (modern Salaspils) on 27 September 1605, when, with barely 4,000 troops, mostly the Winged hussar heavy cavalry, he annihilated a Swedish army three times the size of his force. For that feat he received letters of congratulation from Pope Paul V, most of Catholic royalty, and even the Sultan of the Ottoman Empire and the Shah of Persia. Soon afterward, he was rewarded with the rank of Lithuanian Grand Hetman, in addition to a number of royal land grants and leases.

Yet this great victory was virtually fruitless, owing to the domestic dissensions; the Sejm (Commonwealth parliament) failed to agree on raising the funds needed for the war effort. Chodkiewicz was one of the magnates who remained loyal to king Sigismund III Vasa, and helped him to defeat the Zebrzydowski rebellion in 1606–1607. He commanded the Crown Army's right wing during the Battle of Guzów on 6–7 July 1607, in which the insurgents were defeated, and then quelled the unrest in the Grand Duchy of Lithuania, fighting against another rebellious magnate, Janusz Radziwiłł, until Radziwiłł negotiated a settlement with the king in 1608. A fresh invasion of Livonia by the Swedes recalled him thither once more, and in 1609 he relieved Riga and recaptured Pernau. He improvised a small fleet and dealt a surprise blow to the Swedish Navy at the Battle of Salis.

=== Wars in the East and South ===
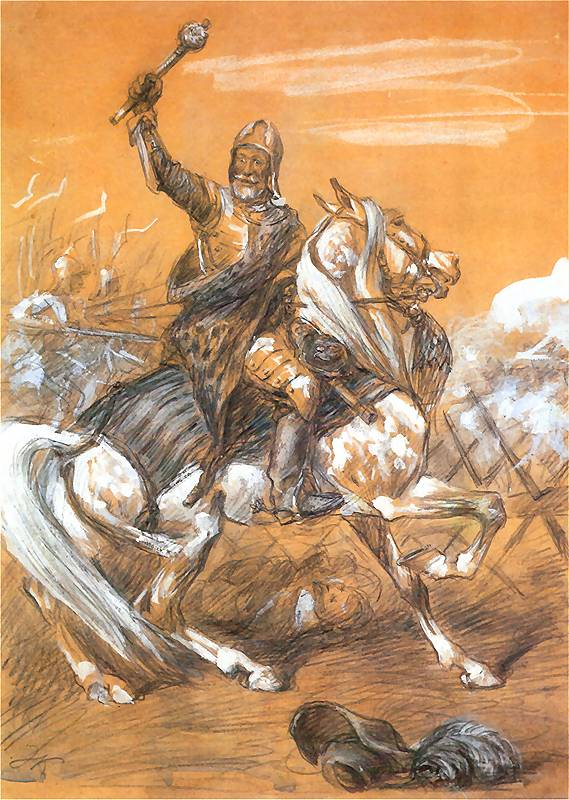
Jan Karol Chodkiewicz painted by Juliusz Kossak

Meanwhile, the Dimitriad wars with Muscovy broke out. Instigated by King Sigismund III, the war was unpopular among Lithuanian magnates, and Chodkiewicz was no exception; in fact his displeasure was so public and significant that he lost the royal favor for a time. Eventually their differences subsided, and Chodkiewicz was sent against the Muscovites, operating first near Smolensk and Pskov. Soon, the Polish–Lithuanian forces started garnering victories, such as the capture of Smolensk, and some, like Grand Crown Hetman Żółkiewski, planned for a grand Polish–Lithuanian–Muscovite Commonwealth. Chodkiewicz was tasked by the king with an advance on Moscow. However, the Sejm neglected to pay for the maintenance of the armies once more, resulting in the mutiny of some units. Chodkiewicz fought several inconclusive battles against the Muscovites in autumn 1611 and then, after the Battle of Moscow (1612), retreated. Disappointed with the outcome, he became once again estranged from the king, and criticized the campaign at the Sejm of 1613. Over the next few years, in the period of 1613–15, Chodkiewicz defended the Commonwealth gains in the Smolensk area, and dealt with unrest in Lithuania. Not till the crown prince, Władysław arrived with tardy reinforcements did the war could assume a more offensive character once again. The army, nominally commanded by Władysław, but in practice under Chodkiewicz's experienced command, took the Dorogobuzh fortress on 11 October 1617. The siege of Mozhaysk in December of subsequent year proved unsuccessful, and this marked the end of the conflict.

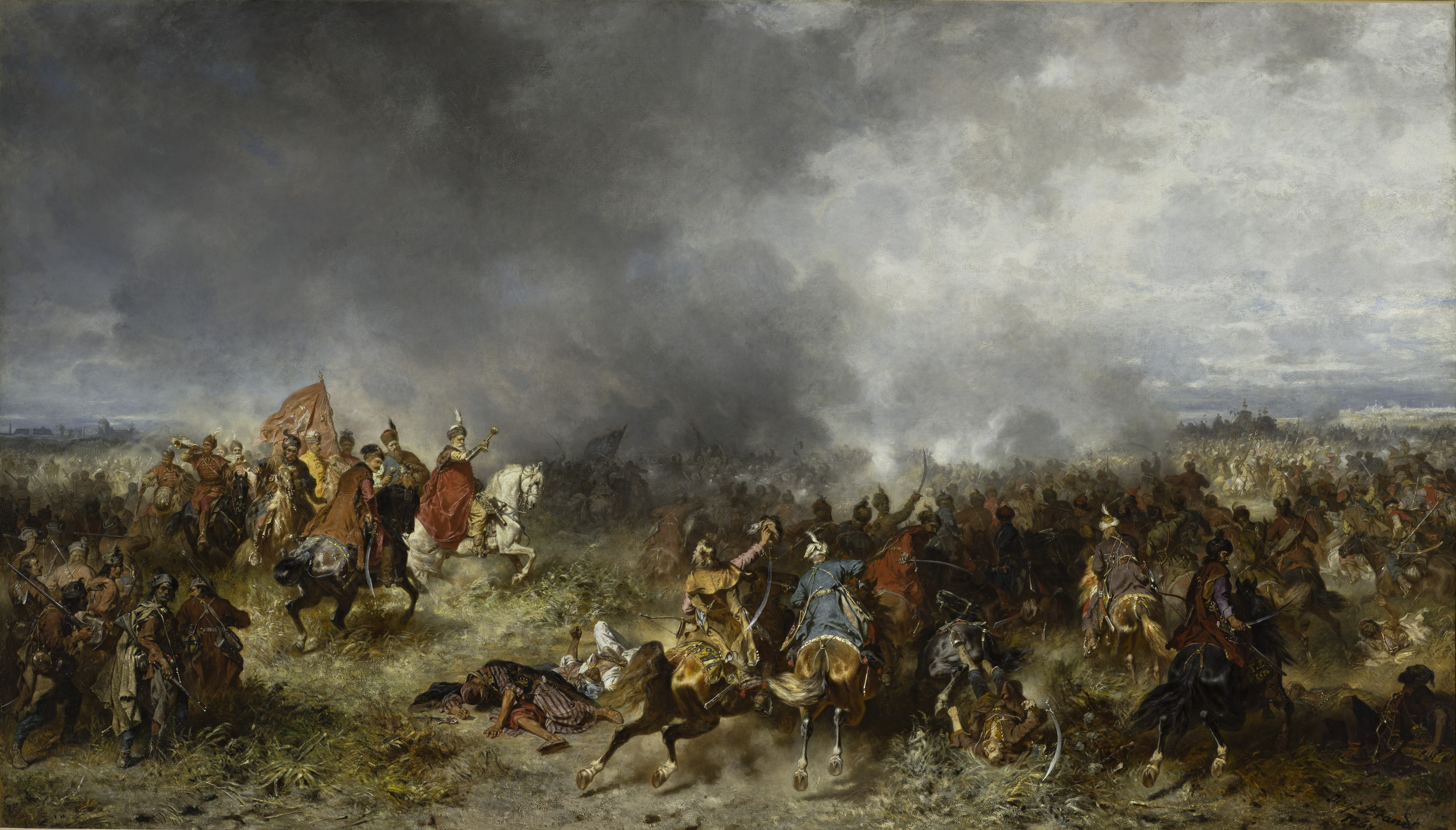
Jan Karol Chodkiewicz (in red) at Chocim, 1621

The Polish-Muscovite War had no sooner been ended by the Truce of Deulino than Chodkiewicz was hastily dispatched southwards to defend the southern frontier against the Turks, who, in the opening phase of the Polish–Ottoman War, defeated Polish forces at Cecora, killing Hetman Żółkiewski. An army of 160,000 Turks and 60,000 Tatars led by Sultan Osman II in person advanced on the Polish frontier. Opposed it were the Commonwealth forces, numbering about 70,000, half of them a Cossack detachment under Cossack hetman Petro Konashevych-Sahaidachny. Chodkiewicz crossed the Dnieper in September 1621, and entrenched himself in the Khotyn Fortress, directly in the path of the Ottoman advance. During the Battle of Khotyn Chodkiewicz resisted the sultan's 200-thousand army for a whole month,. but the victory cost his life. A few days before the siege was raised and the Ottomans decided to open negotiations, the aged Grand Lithuanian Hetman, already suffering from illness since the campaign's opening, died in the fortress on 24 September 1621.

Chodkiewicz's body was transported to Kamianets-Podilskyi, where he was buried on 14 October 1621. A few months later, in the summer of 1622, his widow arranged for exhumation, and Chodkiewicz was reburied in Ostroh in June that year. In 1627 he was moved to a new chapel in Ostroh, where he reburied again. His body was evacuated from Ostroh during the Khmelnytsky Uprising in 1648, and returned there in 1654. It was reburied yet again in a new tomb in Ostroh in 1722.

== Assessment and remembrance ==
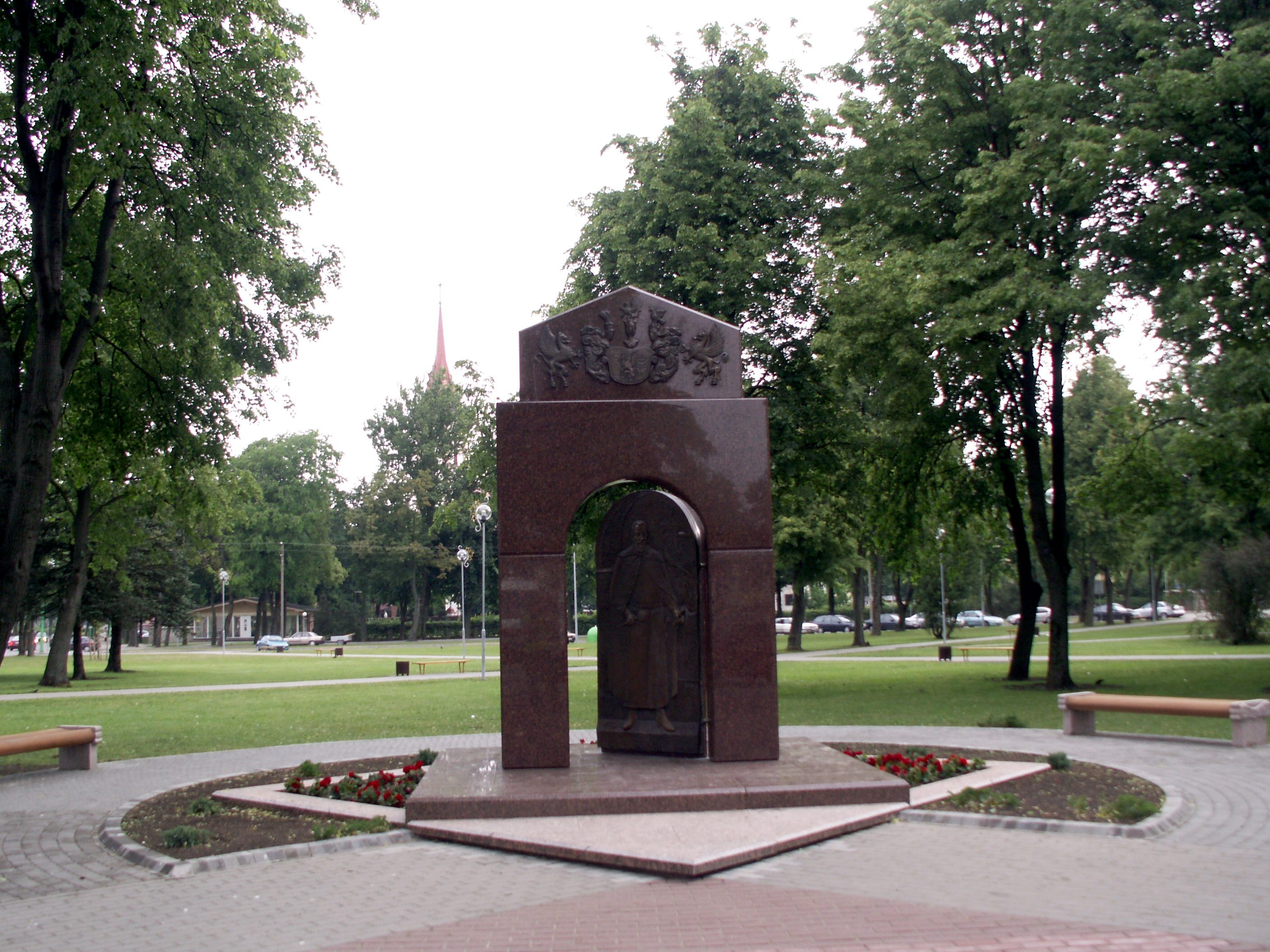
A monument to Chodkiewicz in Kretinga, present-day Lithuania

In 1937, Polish historian Wanda Dobrowolska, wrote in her Polish Biographical Dictionary entry on Chodkiewicz that he was one of the chief members of the "Great Hetman era", renowned for his talent as a strategist and organizer. She notes that Chodkiewicz possessed an iron will, which he was able to impose on the troops under his command, and that he was an efficient commander, although more respected and feared than beloved by his troops. Dobrowolska notes that he was an energetic and explosive antithesis of the composed Żółkiewski, another great hetman of this era, whom Chodkiewicz disliked and competed with throughout his life.

Chodkiewicz was not particularly involved in the Commonwealth's politics, although his high office and wealth gave him significant influence; for the most part he used his political influence, and base of support in Lithuania, to gather support for his military plans, increase the armies' sizes, and personal gratifications. His life was dominated by warfare, if not on the front lines, then on the political scene against other Lithuanian magnates, particularly the Radziwiłł family and the Sejm politicians whom he held responsible for not passing enough taxes to support the armies he wanted.

Over his career he acquired significant wealth, and funded a number of churches and other prestigious buildings. He often worked with the Jesuits, including funding their College in Kražiai. He strongly believed his service should be rewarded with land grants, but he would simultaneously often use his own money to pay for military expenses. In his private life he is remembered as a very proud individual, and for stressing his identity as a member of the Lithuanian nobility. He was a family man, devoted to his family, but his only son, from his marriage in 1593 to Zofia Mielecka, died aged 16 in 1613, and she died in 1618. He remarried in 1620, wedding Anna Alojza Ostrogska in November 1620, shortly before departing on his final campaign. Also that year his daughter Anna married a Lithuanian magnate, Jan Stanisław Sapieha.

Some poems and other works praising him were written during his lifetime, and a religious work was dedicated to him by the Jesuit Piotr Skarga. More works on Chodkiewicz were written in the years after his death. He was one of Wacław Potocki's characters in his epic novel on the Khotyn war (Polish: Transakcja wojny chocimskiej), and he also appeared in the works of Julian Ursyn Niemcewicz and Zofia Kossak-Szczucka, usually portrayed as a patriot and military genius.

In 2021, commemorating the 400th anniversary of his death, a number of ceremonies were held in Lithuania. Firstly, a monument of Jan Karol Chodkiewicz was unveiled in a yard of the Chodkevičiai Palace in Vilnius. Also, a new Lithuanian award Jonas Karolis Chodkevičius Gold Medal for State Strengthening Activities was established, with its first laureate being Jonas Ohmanas. While commemorating the same anniversary in Kretinga, which was established by Jan Karol Chodkiewicz in 1602, a cenotaph was placed in Chodkiewicz family crypt of the Church of the Annunciation to the Blessed Virgin Mary as in his testament he demanded to be buried in Kretinga's church crypt, alongside his first wife and his sons, however his remains fate is unknown as his second wife buried him in Ukraine, but the church with his remains was demolished in the 19th century. Also, Lithuanian Armed Forces Motorized Infantry Brigade Žemaitija was renamed to Lithuanian Grand Hetman Jonas Karolis Chodkevičius Infantry Brigade Žemaitija.

== See also ==
- Military of the Polish–Lithuanian Commonwealth
