= Alan Axelrod =

American author (born 1952)

- Born: August 25, 1952 (age 74); New York City, United States
- Occupation: Author
- Writing career
- Genre: History
- Notable work: Elizabeth I: CEO

Alan Axelrod (born August 25, 1952) is an American author of history, business and management books. As of October 2018, he had written more than 150 books. Axelrod resides in Atlanta, Georgia.

== Life ==
Axelrod was born on August 25, 1952, in New York City. He received his doctorate in English from the University of Iowa in 1979, specializing in the literature and culture of colonial America and the early republic of the United States. He has taught at Lake Forest College and Furman University, worked as a publishing executive, and has been a consultant to historical museums, cultural institutions, television's Civil War Journal, the WB Network, and the Discovery Channel.

Axelrod was a featured speaker at the 2004 Conference on Excellence in Government in Washington, DC. He has also been a speaker at the Leadership Institute of Columbia College (South Carolina) in Columbia, South Carolina, and at the 2005 Annual Conference of the Goizueta School of Business, at Emory University in Atlanta, Georgia. He also spoke at the 2014 annual conference of Ecopetrol in Bogotá, Colombia.

== Publications ==
- Charles Brockden Brown: An American Tale (1983)
- Chronicle of the Indian Wars: From Colonial Times to Wounded Knee (1990)
- The War Between the Spies: A History of Espionage During the American Civil War (1992) Atlantic Monthly ISBN 0-87113-482-9
- International Encyclopedia of Secret Societies and Fraternal Orders New York; Facts on File, 1997
- The Encyclopedia of Wars (1997). co-authored with Charles Phillips
- The Complete Idiot's Guide to the American Revolution, The Complete Idiot's Guide Series (1999)
- Patton On Leadership: Strategic Lessons for Corporate Warfare, (1999) Prentice Hall ISBN 0-7352-0091-2
- Elizabeth I: CEO (2000) Prentice Hall ISBN 0-7352-0189-7
- American History ASAP (2003)
- Lincoln's Last Night: Abraham Lincoln, John Wilkes Booth, and the Last 36 Hours Before the Assassination (2005)
- Eisenhower On Leadership: Ike's Enduring Lessons in Total Victory Management, (2006) Jossey-Bass ISBN 0-7879-8238-5
- Profiles in Audacity: Great Decisions and How They Were Made. Sterling. 2006. p. 320. ISBN 1402732821.
- The Complete Idiot's Guide to Forensics, The Complete Idiot's Guide Series (2007)
- The Real History of the American Revolution: A new look at the past (2007)
- Bradley. Palgrave Macmillan. 2008. ISBN 978-0230608566.
- The Real History of World War II: A New Look at the Past (2008)
- The Complete Idiot's Guide to Astronomy, The Complete Idiot's Guide Series (2008)
- Profiles in Folly: History's worst decisions and why they went wrong (2008)
- Blooding at Great Meadows: Young George Washington and the Battle That Shaped the Man (2008)
- What Every American Should Know about American History (2008)
- Edison on Innovation: 102 Lessons in Creativity for Business and Beyond (2008)
- Selling the Great War: the making of American Propaganda (March 2009)
- Risk: Adversaries and Allies: Mastering Strategic Relationships. Sterling. 2009. ISBN 978-1402754111.
- Winston Churchill: CEO (2009)
- The Real History of the Cold War: A New Look at the Past (2009)
- Miracle at Belleau Wood: The Birth of the Modern U.S. Marine Corps (2010) (Published in hardcover 2007) The Lyons Press ISBN 978-1-59921-025-4
- The Complete Idiot's Guide to the New World Order (2010)
- Gandhi: CEO (2010) Sterling ISBN 978-1-4027-5806-5
- Napoleon: CEO (2011) Sterling ISBN 978-1-4027-7906-0 (Hardcover), ISBN 978-1-4027-8893-2 (ebook)
- Lost Destiny: Joe Kennedy Jr. and the Doomed WWII Mission to Save London (2015) Palgrave Macmillan ISBN 9781137279040
- The Gilded Age: 1876-1912 Overture To The American Century (2017) ISBN 978-1-4549-2575-0.
- How America Won World War I: The U.S. Military Victory in the Great War – The Causes, The Course and The Consequences. Guilford, Connecticut: Globe Pequot, 2018. ISBN 978-1-4930-3192-4.
