= Polish–Swedish War (1600–1611) =

Conflict over Livonia, Estonia, and the Swedish throne

- Part of the Polish–Swedish War of 1600–1629
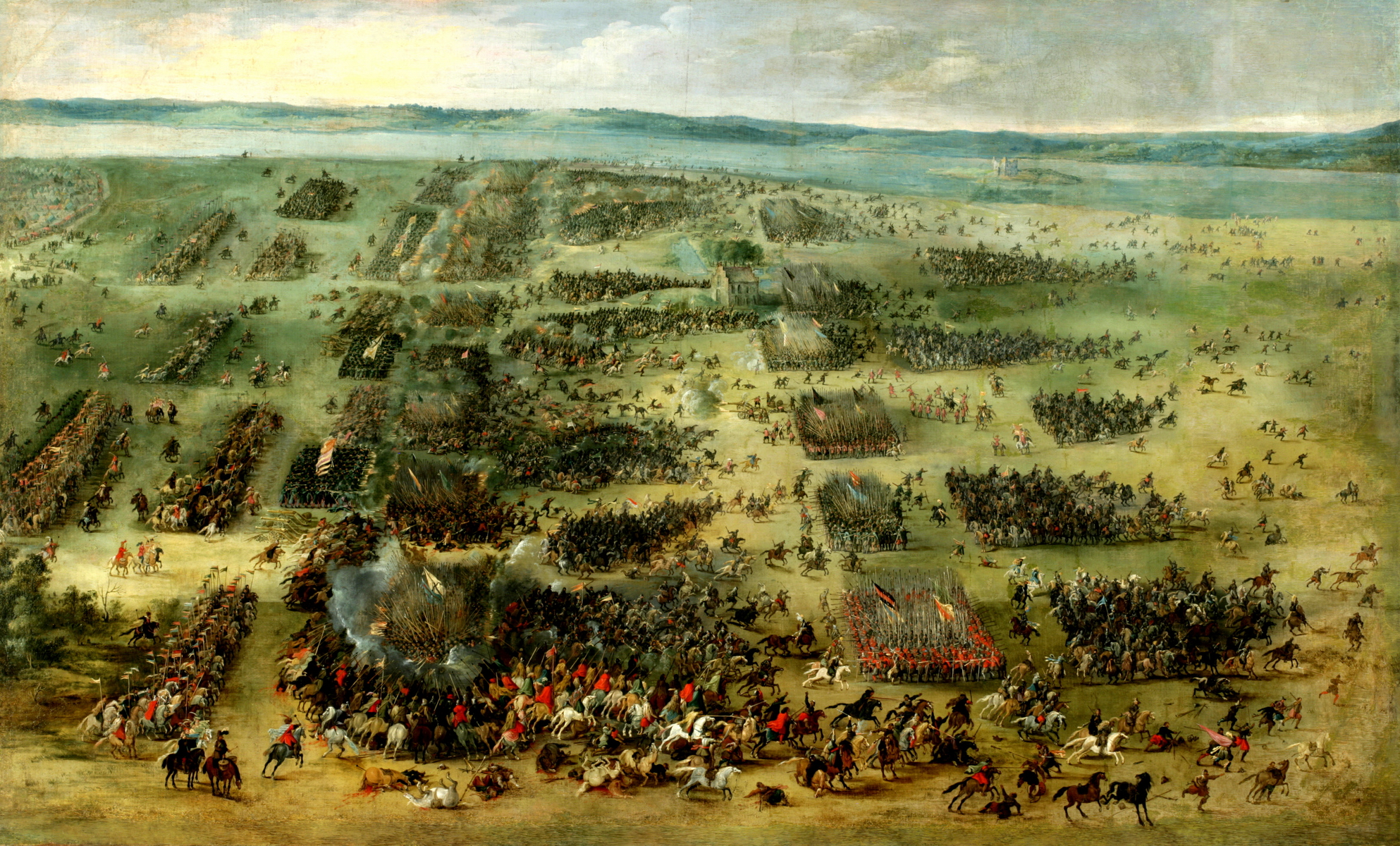
- Battle of Kircholm
Date	1600–1611
Location	Estonia; Livonia; Latvia
Result	See § Outcome
Territorial changes	Status quo ante bellum

Belligerents
Sweden	Polish–Lithuanian Commonwealth

Commanders and leaders
(History of Sweden (1523–1611)) Charles IX (History of Sweden (1523–1611)) Carl Gyllenhielm (History of Sweden (1523–1611)) Anders Lennartsson † (History of Sweden (1523–1611)) Frederick Mansfeld (History of Sweden (1523–1611)) Arvid Stålarm	(Polish–Lithuanian Commonwealth) Sigismund III (Polish–Lithuanian Commonwealth) Jan Karol Chodkiewicz (Polish–Lithuanian Commonwealth) Jan Zamoyski (Polish–Lithuanian Commonwealth) Stanisław Żółkiewski (Polish–Lithuanian Commonwealth) Thunderbolt Radziwiłł (Polish–Lithuanian Commonwealth) Jürgen von Farensbach †

The Polish–Swedish War (1600–1611) was a continuation of struggle between Sweden and the Polish–Lithuanian Commonwealth over control of Livonia and Estonia, as well as the dispute over the Swedish throne between Charles IX of Sweden and Sigismund III of Poland. After skirmishes, sieges and battles often aborted by Jan Karol Chodkiewicz, a truce was signed until the later invasion by the Russians.

== Background ==
This conflict between the Polish–Lithuanian Commonwealth and Sweden traces its roots to the War against Sigismund. In this civil war (1597–1599), Sigismund III Vasa, at one time king of both the Commonwealth and Sweden, lost the throne of Sweden. Few Commonwealth troops participated in that conflict, and it is mostly regarded as a Swedish civil war, not part of the Polish–Swedish wars. After an early stalemate, Sigismund was defeated at the Battle of Stångebro in 1598.

By 1599, Sigismund was dethroned by his uncle, Duke Charles, and forced to retreat to the Commonwealth. This spelled the end of the short-lived Polish–Swedish union). However, Sigismund refused to give up on regaining the Swedish throne. From then on, most of his policies would revolve around his attempts to conquer Sweden, although Commonwealth nobility (szlachta) had little will for such a long and bloody conflict. Sigismund began his plans in 1599, when he confirmed the pacta conventa. These documents, signed when he was elected as King of Poland, promised that the then-Swedish territory of Estonia would become part of the Commonwealth.

== War ==
=== Early battles ===
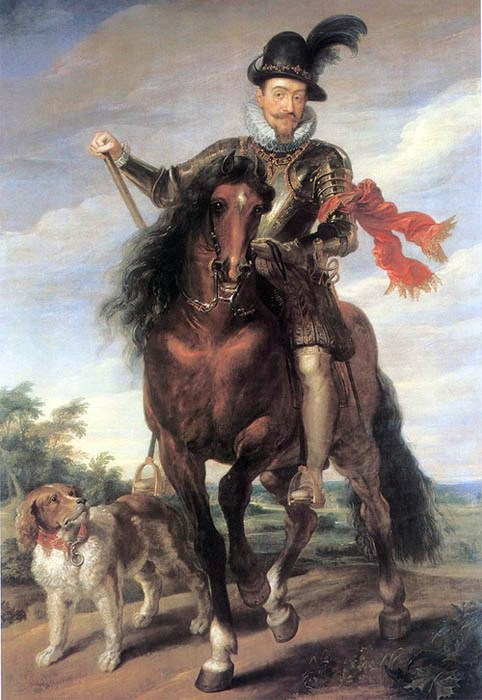
Sigismund III of Poland, by Rubens

Thus, the Commonwealth was forced to fight on two fronts, as its armies were also needed south to deal with the Moldavian Magnate Wars, and Swedish forces quickly gained 3:1 numerical superiority. In the beginning of the war, in 1600, although a Commonwealth army under Krzysztof Mikołaj "Piorun" Radziwiłł striking first was able to deal the Swedish forces several defeats in the open fields, Swedes took control not only of Estonia, but of most of Livonia, the Commonwealth territory south of Estonia (the entire region was known in Poland as Inflanty (German: Livland)). The Polish parliament, the Sejm, reacted by increasing funds for the army and recalling forces and commanders from the southern front (deemed less important as most of that war took place outside Commonwealth territory) to the threatened north.

In 1601, Lithuanian hetman Jan Karol Chodkiewicz and Polish chancellor Jan Zamoyski, recalled from Moldavia, arrived in Lithuania to fight the Swedish incursion, which now threatened not only the Estonia promised by Sigismund, but older Polish territories south of it. Chodkiewicz and Radziwiłł defeated the Swedes in the first major open battle of this war at Kokenhusen (modern Koknese) in early 1601 (see battle of Kokenhausen). Soon afterwards, Jan Zamoyski, fresh from his victory against the Moldavians, came in to help against the Swedes, with 12,000 men, and 50 artillery pieces, 15 of which were classified as heavy. Charles was unable to deal effectively with such an army and was forced to retreat. However, during the retreat he left sizable numbers of defenders at various captured fortresses in Livonia. Zamoyski now took to siege warfare instead of chasing the retreating King, soon capturing Wolmar (Valmiera) and Fellin (Viljandi, Felin). By 1602, the Swedes were only left with control of Reval (Tallinn, Talin, Rewl), Pernau (Pärnu, Parnau, Parnawa), Hapsal (Haapsalu, Hapsalu), and Dorpat (Tartu). However, Zamoyski, now 60 years old, had fallen ill. Chodkiewicz took command and laid siege to Dorpat. At Wesenberg (Rakvere), he defeated a Swedish reinforcement force under Arvid Eriksson Stålarm sent to relieve the Swedish troops in Dorpat. The town surrendered in April 1603.

Chodkiewicz was appointed acting commander in chief of Lithuania forces after Zamoyski's return south in 1602 (Zamoyski would never return to lead the armies, his health deteriorated, and he would die in 1605). Chodkiewicz, despite inadequate supplies and little support from the Commonwealth Sejm (parliament) and King Sigismund III Vasa, brilliantly distinguished himself, capturing fortress after fortress and repulsing the duke of Södermanland, afterwards Charles IX, from Riga. However, Reval, Pernau, and Narwa (Narva, Narew) remained under Swedish control. In 1604, Chodkiewicz defeated the Swedish generals at Weissenstein (present-day Paide), often winning against superior odds. At Weissenstein, where he had only 2,300 men, he defeated a 6,000 man Swedish force.

Chodkiewicz was rewarded by the king with the grand hetman buława of Lithuania. However, the war was neglected by the Commonwealth's parliament, which turned a deaf ear to all his requests for reinforcements and for supplies and money to pay his soldiers. The Commonwealth's de-centralised financial system (all taxes had to be agreed upon by all the nobility at Sejm and regional Sejmiks) meant that the Commonwealth treasury was almost always empty. This flaw plagued the Commonwealth for centuries. Chodkiewicz more than held his own against the Swedes. He instituted a new form of warfare based upon his use of the elite hussar cavalry and consequently the Swedes were defeated again and again in the open field. First the Poles attacked Swedish cavalry, after which they usually attacked demoralized Swedish infantry unable to retreat and usually annihilated whole formations of this infantry.

In 1605, the Swedes again spent large sums of money to conscript a new massive army. The Riksdag spent much cash on conscripting new formations and as well as this, Russian tsar Boris Godunov gave the Swedes much financial help, likely attempting to keep both Sweden and the Commonwealth busy during the Time of Troubles. The Swedes were able to hire large numbers of mercenaries, as well as hiring many siege engineers from all over Europe. In 1605, a few miles from Reval, a 5,000 strong army led by Anders Lennartson of Forstena landed in Estonia again. Several days later, another Swedish expedition, numbering around 4,000 and led by Count Frederick Joachim Mansfeld, landed near and besieged the fortress of Dünamünde (Daugavgrīva, Dynemunt) near Riga, although without any success. After this setback, they began laying siege to Riga. Their main mission was to capture this important city, one of the largest Baltic ports.

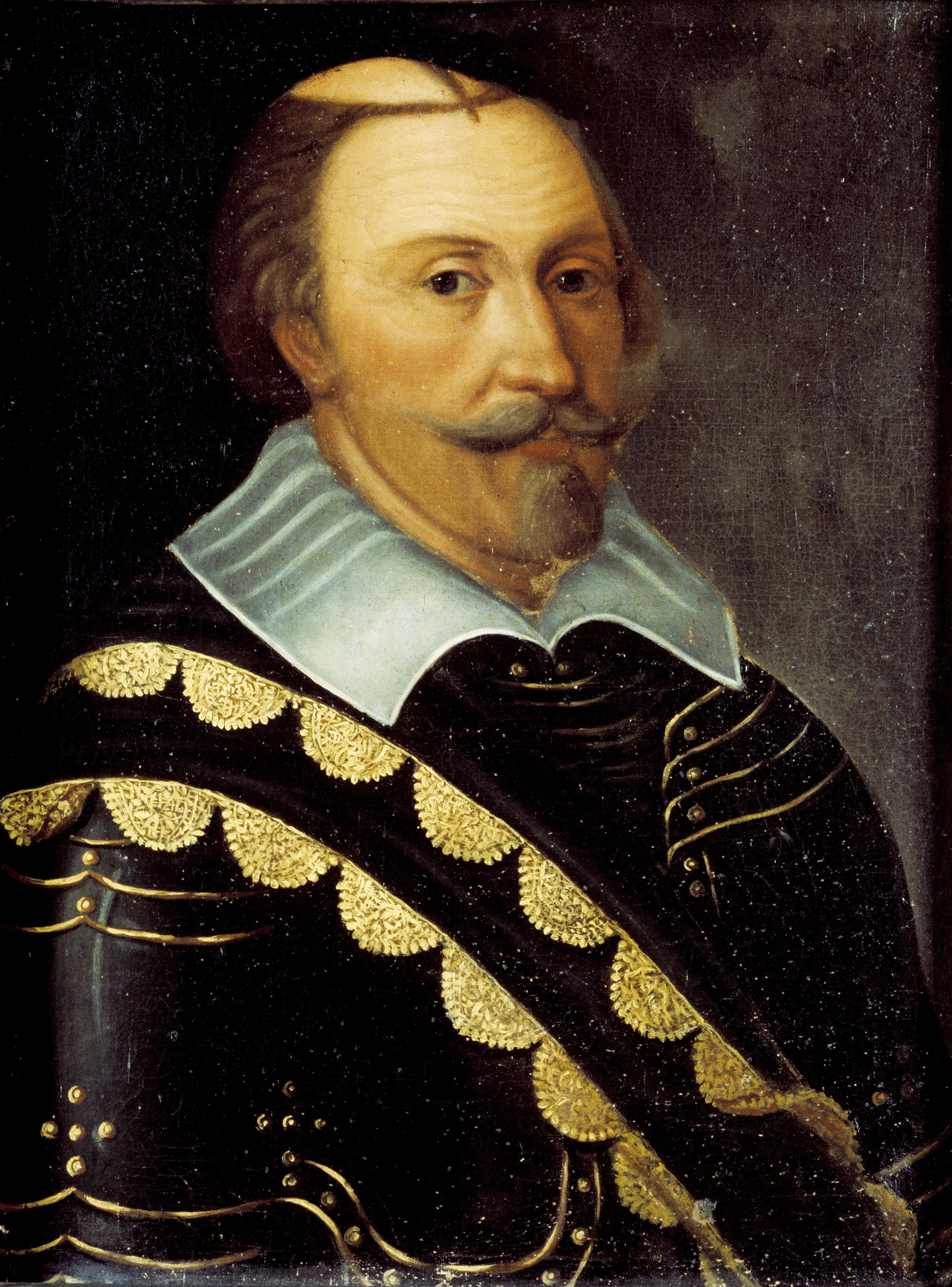
Charles IX of Sweden

Chodkiewicz, who failed to prevent the Swedish forces from joining, moved from Cēsis (Wenden) to near Salaspils (Kircholm) and Ikšķile (Üxküll), where he built a small fortified camp. Charles, who arrived at Riga on 23 September, learned of the Chodkiewicz force nearby and decided to destroy it with an attack by the majority of the Swedish force within the area. On 27 September the Swedish force under King Charles moved towards Kircholm. The Battle of Kircholm (Salaspils) on 27 September 1605, near Düna (Daugava, Dvina, Dźwina, Väinä) River would be Chodkiewicz's crowning achievement despite having smaller forces (approximately at 1:3 disadvantage again). He used a "feint" to force the Swedes off their high position. The Swedes under Charles thought the Polish–Lithuanians were retreating. Therefore, they advanced, spreading out their formations to give chase. This is what Chodkiewicz was waiting for. The Commonwealth's army now gave fire with their infantry causing the Swedes some losses, at which point the Hussars moved into a re-formation and charged at the Swedish infantry formations. The Swedish formations broke completely, the King himself fleeing, barely escaping back to his flotilla off the coast. Thus, Chodkiewicz with barely 3,600 troops defeated a Swedish army of 11,000 soldiers.

Yet, owing to the domestic dissensions which prevailed in the Commonwealth during the following five years. Chodkiewicz's own army, unpaid for years, abandoned him at last en masse in order to plunder the estates of their political opponents, leaving the hetman to carry on the war as best he could with a handful of mercenaries paid out of the pockets of himself and his friends. With tiny, inadequate forces, Chodkiewicz nonetheless prevented Swedes from overrunning the entire Inflanty (Latgale) region, helped by the relative inaction of Swedish commanders until 1608. Chodkiewicz, one of the magnates who remained loyal to the king, had to divide his attention between the rebellion against Sigismund in the Commonwealth (the Zebrzydowski Rebellion, 1606–1609) and a fresh invasion of Livonia by the Swedes led by Mansfeld in 1608. Eventually, a truce was signed in 1611 after the death of Charles IX. It would last until 1617 (or November 1620, conflicting sources). During the next decade, the Commonwealth was occupied by its war against Russia. Southern borders were also endangered by the constant troubles with the Ottoman Empire in the Magnate wars in Moldavia.

== Outcome ==
The result of the war is disputed among historians. Some historians, like Edgar Kiser, Kriss A. Drass, and William Brustein, claim that the outcome of the war was "even", while other historians, like Andrej Kotljarchuk, claim that the war was a Polish–Lithuanian military success. The war is listed as having an "undecided" outcome in the Encyclopedia of Wars by Charles Phillips and Alan Axelrod.

== See also ==
- List of wars between Poland and Sweden

== Works cited ==
- Phillips, Charles; Axelrod, Alan (2005). Encyclopedia of Wars. Facts On File. ISBN 9781438110301.
