= Siege of Smolensk (1613–1617) =

1613–1617 blockade

Siege of Smolensk(1613-1617)
- Part of the Polish–Muscovite War (1605–1618)
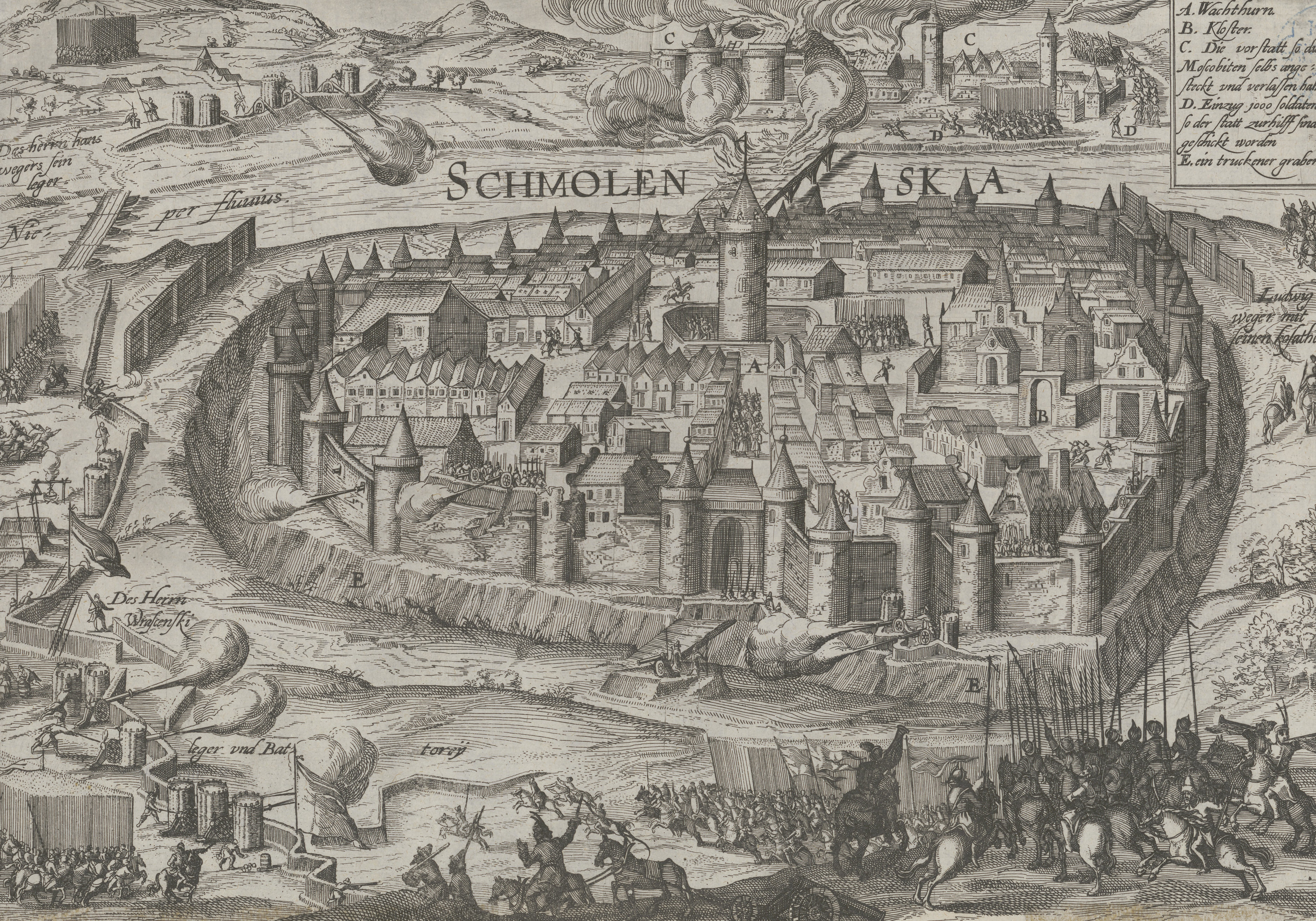
Date	August 1613 – May 1617
Location	Smolensk 54°47′N 32°03′E
Result	Polish-Lithuanian victory

Belligerents
Tsardom of Russia	Polish–Lithuanian Commonwealth

Commanders and leaders
(Tsardom of Russia) Dmitry Cherkassky (Tsardom of Russia) Ivan Khovansky	(Polish–Lithuanian Commonwealth) Alexander Gonsevsky (Polish–Lithuanian Commonwealth) Alexander Lisovsky

Strength
Up to 12,000 (the largest number); 5,000–6,000 (average number)	Up to 2,000 (garrison); Up to 2,500 (troops outside the fortress)

Casualties and losses
Heavy	Light

The siege of Smolensk (1613–1617) is an episode of the Polish–Muscovite War (1605–1618).

== Prelude ==
After the tactical victory in the Battle of Moscow (1612), the Russian government made an attempt to repulse the Poles from the strategically important fortress of Smolensk. Russian troops without a fight retook Vyazma (July 7, 1613), Dorogobuzh, and Bely, an important outpost on the Lithuanian frontier.

== Siege ==
Russian troops for almost four years led a protracted and unsuccessful siege of the city, which consisted mainly of blockade of the garrison. During the siege, no attempt was made to assault. In the beginning of 1617, with the onset of the offensive of Polish–Lithuanian troops on Moscow (Wladislaw III campaign), the siege was lifted.

== Aftermath ==
The unsuccessful siege of Smolensk predetermined the unsuccessful completion of the Polish–Muscovite War (1605–18). According to the Truce of Deulino, the Polish–Lithuanian Commonwealth retained the Smolensk lands, which were captured by Russians only in 1654 at the beginning of the next Russo-Polish War (1654-67).
