= Jürgen von Farensbach =

Baltic German nobleman and Livonian general

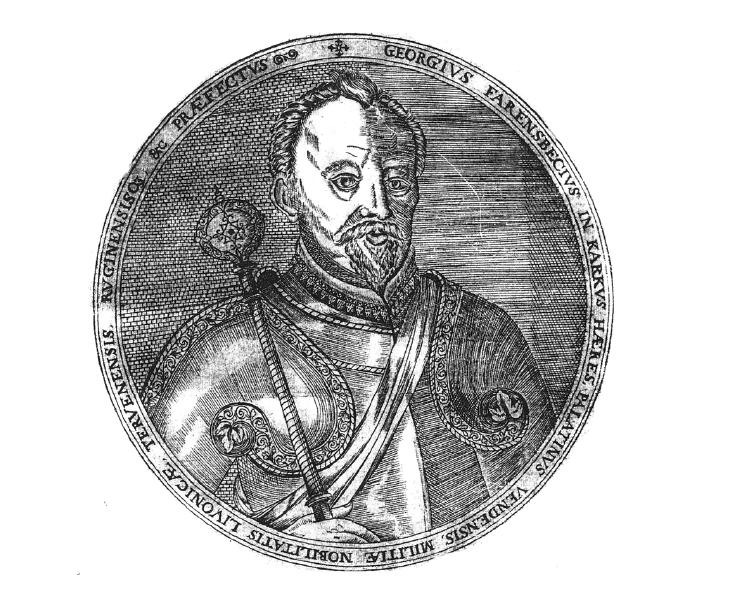
Jürgen von Farensbach

Jürgen von Farensbach (1551–1602) (Russian: Юрий Францбек, Danish: Georg Farensbach, Polish: Jerzy Farensbach) was a Baltic German nobleman and Livonian general. Sent as the Ambassador of Livonian Confederation to Czar Ivan IV of Russia, for concluding a peace treaty, he entered the Russian service and won the battle on Oka against the Tatars on 1 August 1572. Later he served in the Danish and Polish armies. In 1586 Farensbach gained the rank a senator of the Polish crown granted by Sigismund III, whom he had assisted in gaining the throne of Poland. As field marshal of Poland he fought against the Swedish Empire, where he was killed in the attack on the castle of Fellin on 17 May 1602.
