= Salaspils Parish =

Parish of Latvia

- parish of Latvia
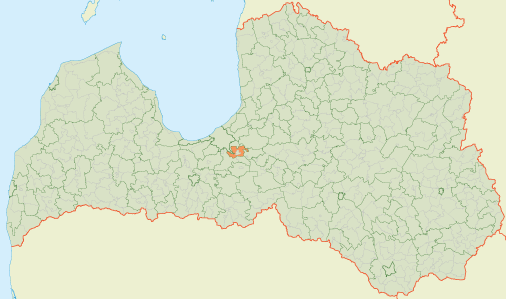
- 56°52′33″N 24°21′00″E
- Country: Latvia

Area
  - Total: 107.70 km^{2} (41.58 sq mi)
  - Land: 85.28 km^{2} (32.93 sq mi)
  - Water: 22.42 km^{2} (8.66 sq mi)

Population (1 January 2024)
  - Total: 5,868
  - Density: 54/km^{2} (140/sq mi)

Salaspils Parish (Latvian: Salaspils pagasts) is an administrative unit of Salaspils Municipality in the Vidzeme region of Latvia. It was created in 2010 from the rural territory of Salaspils town. At the beginning of 2014, the population of the parish was 5329.

== Towns, villages and settlements of Salaspils parish ==
- Acone
- Bunči
- Saulkalne
- Stopiņi

== See also ==
- Dole Manor
- Doles sala
- Vecdole Castle
