= List of islands of Latvia =

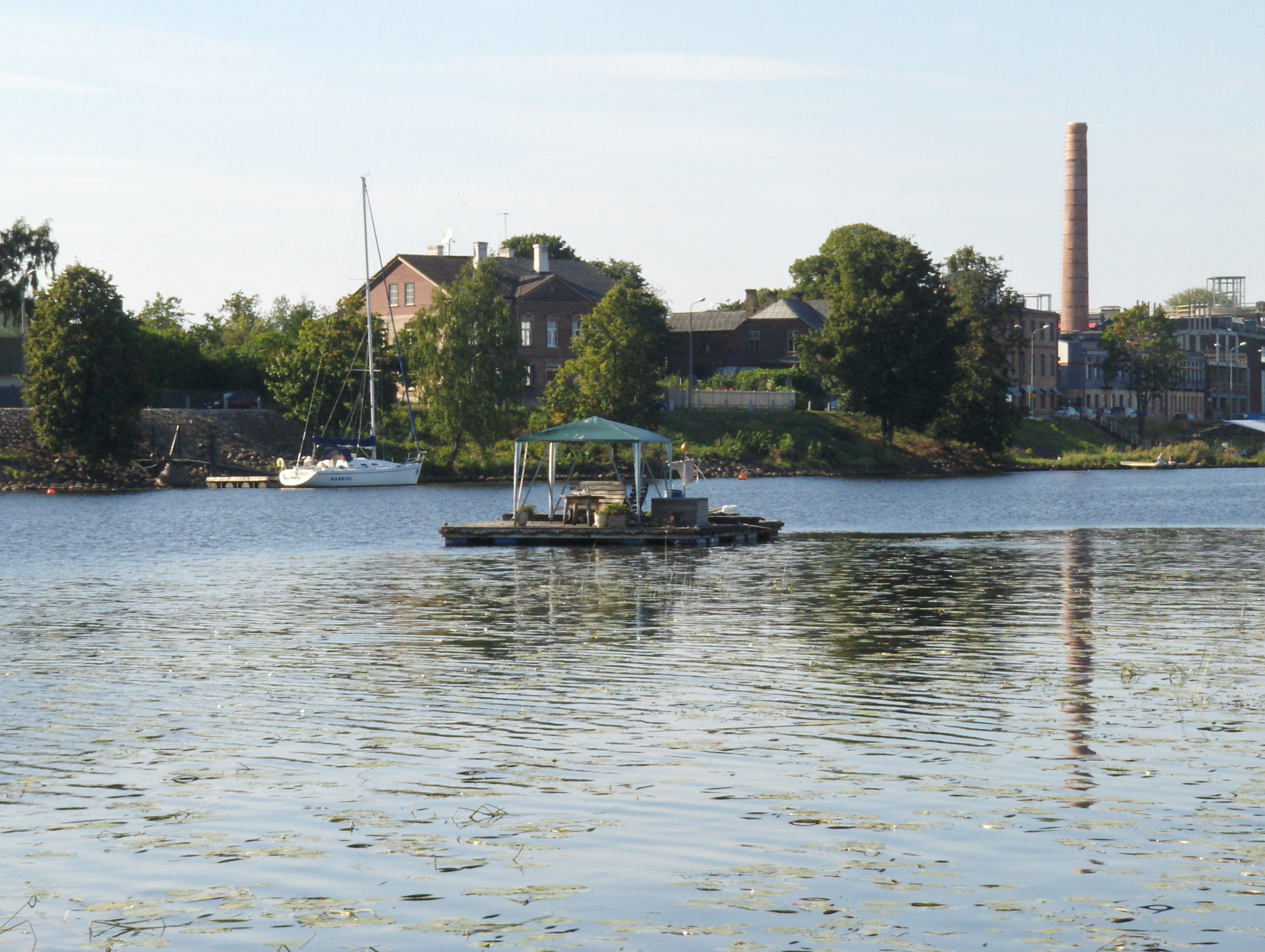
Kipsala

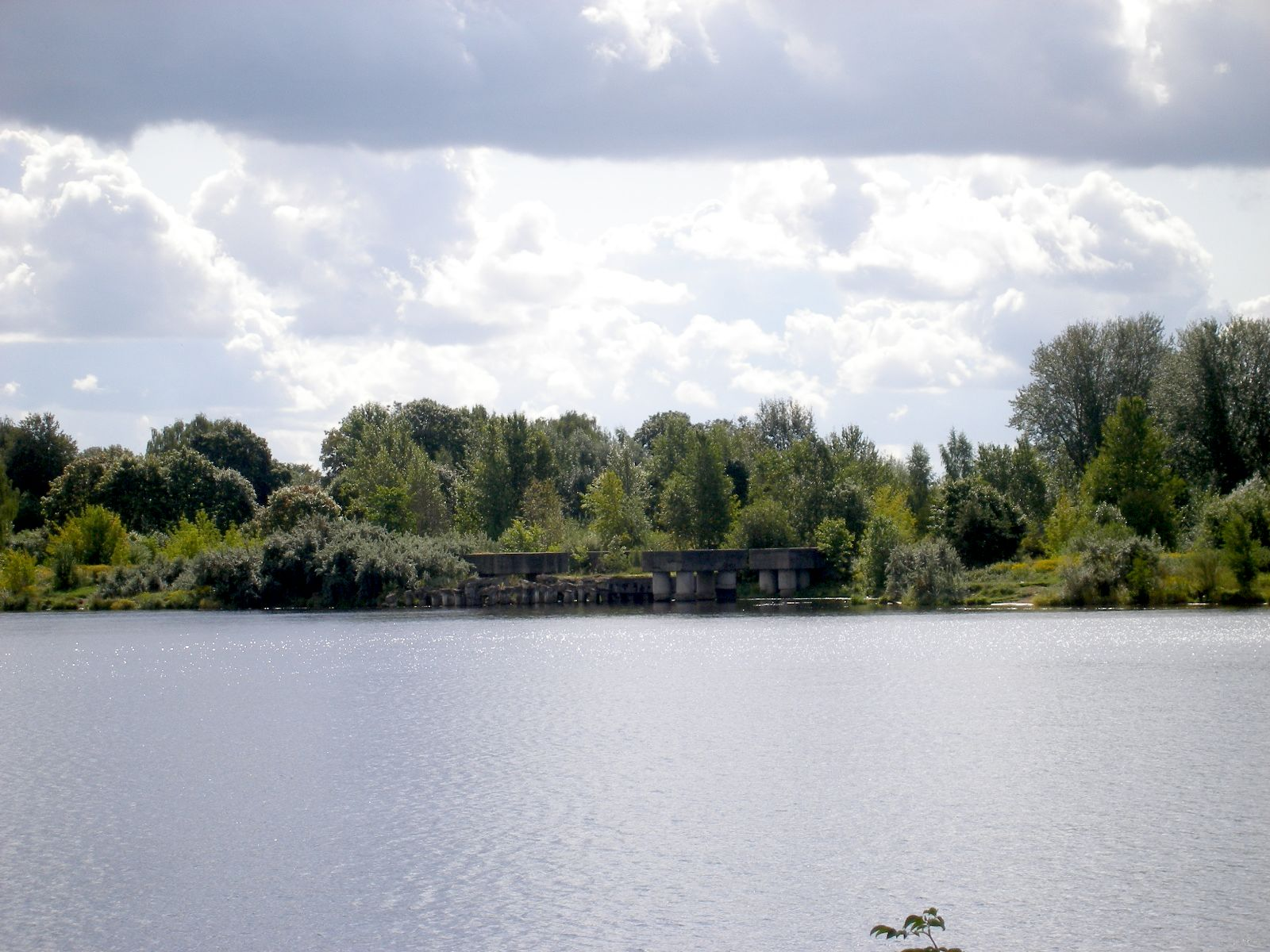
Lucavsala

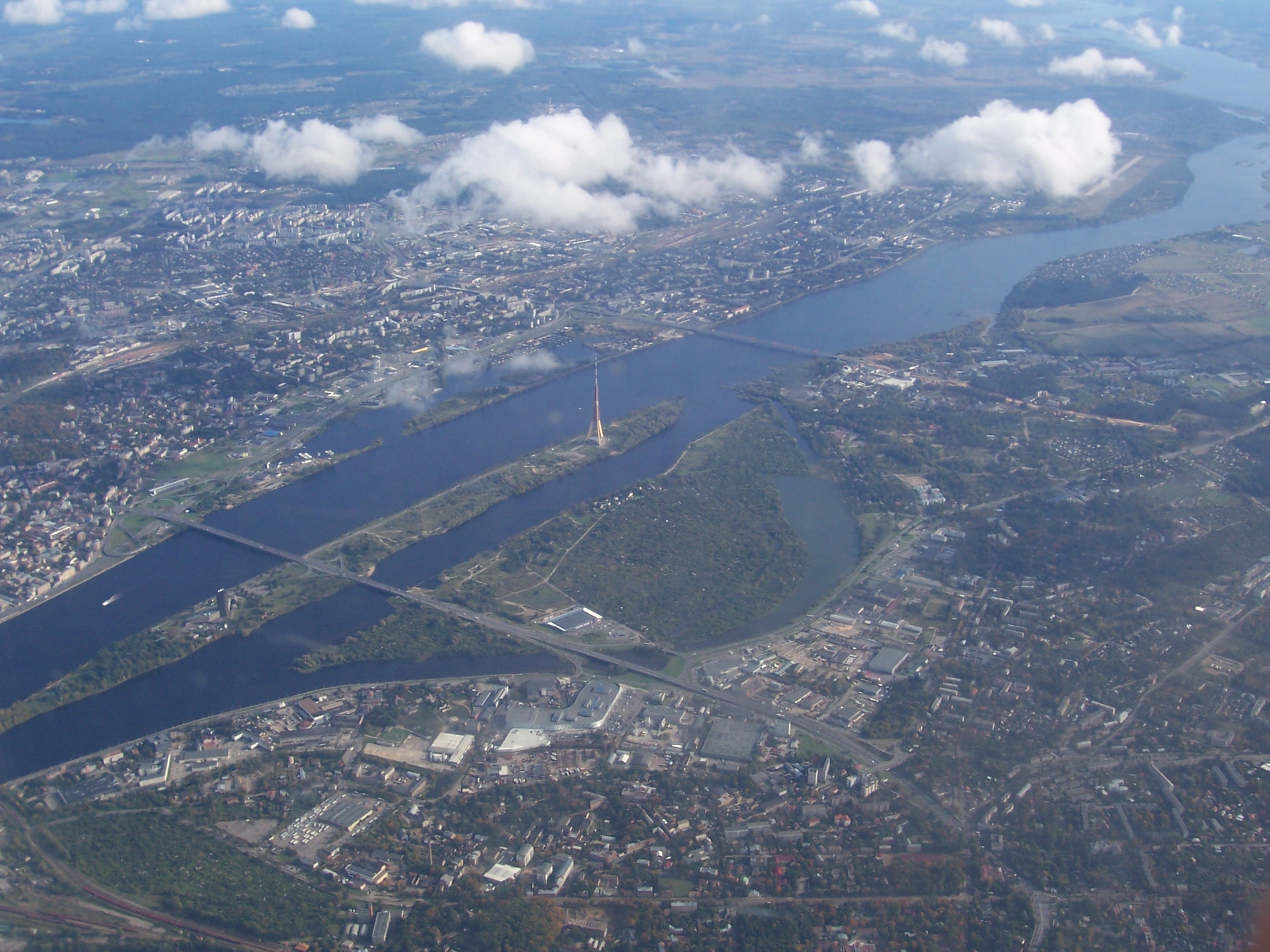
Aerial view of Zaķusala

This is a list of islands of Latvia. There are over 40 islands (sala in Latvian) in Latvia (none of them in the Baltic Sea and all of them in rivers/lakes of the Latvian territory), including the following:

- Ābeļu Salas
- Andreja Sala, 56°58′00″N 24°06′00″E
- Anna Sala, 56°01′32″N 27°12′40″E
- Apšu Sala (Ežezerā)
- Apšu Sala (Lake Rāzna)
- Artura Island, 56°01′27″N 27°12′44″E
- Atteku Sala, 56°30′50″N 21°01′46″E
- Auzu Sala, 57°01′27″N 24°16′49″E
- Bieķiņa Sala, 56°55′00″N 24°06′00″E
- Bridas Sala, 57°22′00″N 21°35′19″E
- Bulllu Sala (Daugavgrīvas Sala), 57°01′37″N 23°59′40″E
- Doles Sala (peninsula), 56°51′30″N 24°14′00″E
- Gulbju Sala, 57°01′00″N 24°06′00″E
- Kazas Sēklis
- Ķīpsala (Kip Island), 56°57′23″N 24°04′52″E
- Krūmiņsala
- Kolka Lighthouse (Artificial island), 57°45′29″N 22°36′04″E
- Krievu Sala, 57°08′29″N 24°19′46″E
- Kundziņsala (Kundzin Island), 57°00′26″N 24°06′16″E
- Kurpnieku Sala (peninsula), 57°01′11″N 24°05′45″E
- Lielā Sala, 57°17′40″N 23°05′42″E
- Lielā Alkšņu Sala, 57°11′00″N 22°08′00″E
- Lielā Iļķeniešu Sala, 57°01′00″N 24°06′00″E
- Lielalksnīte, 57°10′49″N 22°08′13″E
- Liepu Sala, 57°02′13″N 24°18′04″E
- Lucavsala, 56°55′21″N 24°07′24″E
- Mazā Sala, 57°01′45″N 24°17′30″E
- Mazā Zirgu Sala, 56°31′00″N 21°02′00″E
- Mazalksnīte, 57°10′59″N 22°11′05″E
- Mazā Vējzaķu Sala, 56°59′00″N 24°06′00″E
- Mērsala, 56°59′33″N 23°27′42″E
- Mīlestības Saliņa, 57°02′36″N 24°03′03″E
- Moricsala, 57°11′44″N 22°08′49″E
- Muižas Sala, 56°56′00″N 24°08′00″E
- Mūku Sala, 56°56′00″N 24°06′00″E
- Nāves Sala, 56°50′00″N 24°26′37″E
- Peldu Sala, 56°57′00″N 24°05′00″E
- Pērssala, 57°09′14″N 24°21′14″E
- Pils Sala
- Priežu Sala, 57°01′50″N 24°16′47″E
- Putnu Sala, 56°59′43″N 24°05′56″E
- Ropažu Sala, 57°02′26″N 24°18′22″E
- Rutku Sala (Iļķēnsala)
- Sakas Sala (Vidsala)
- Sniķera Sala
- Sudrabsaliņa
- Vadoņa Sala, 57°08′33″N 24°18′58″E
- Vējzaķa Sala, 56°59′06″N 24°06′35″E
- Viskūžu Sala, 57°10′38″N 22°09′50″E
- Zaķusala (Hare Island), 56°56′00″N 24°07′06″E
- Zirgu Sala, 56°31′01″N 21°02′16″E

== See also ==
- List of islands in the Baltic Sea
- List of islands
