= Anders Lennartsson =

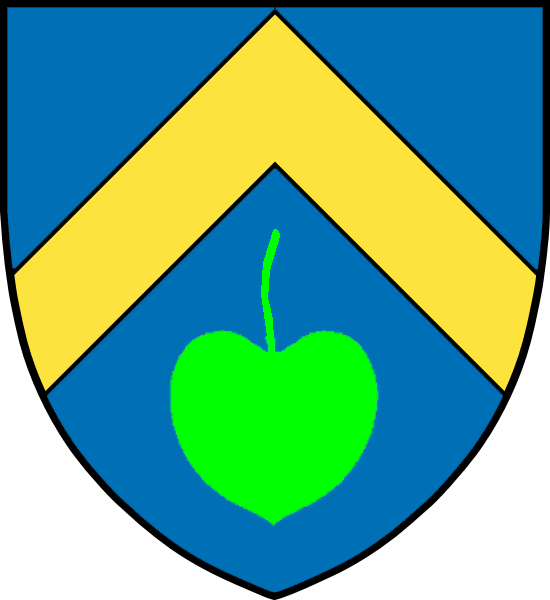
- Coat of arms
- Born: 1561
- Died: 17 September 1605 (O.S.); Salaspils, Latvia
- Noble family: Forstena
- Father: Lennart Torstensson
- Mother: Margareta Andersdotter Ekeblad

Anders Lennartsson of Restad, born 1561, killed in action at the Battle of Kircholm on 17 September 1605, was a Swedish military officer and, from 1600, Lord High Constable of Sweden.

== Family ==
Anders Lennartsson was the son of Lennart Torstensson of the Forstena family, killed in action at siege of Bohus Fortress in 1564 as captain of the Västergötland soldiery, and Margareta Andersdotter Ekeblad (died 1616) of Stola Manor. His brother, Torsten Lennartsson (1561-1631), was the father of the Field Marshal Lennart Torstensson, who was father of the Governor-General of Estonia Anders Torstenson. After his father's death, his mother Margareta in 1573 married Anders Olofsson Oxehufwud (c. 1537–1618) of Hovi Manor in Västergötland.

== Life ==
Anders Lennartson came to Duke Charles's court at a young age, is mentioned in 1593 among his field commanders and as such had a significant share in Charles's victory at the Battle of Stångebro in Linköping in 1598. He was given command of Älvsborg Castle in 1599, sat in the court at the diet of Linköping 1600 that that sentenced five senators to death, and was appointed Lord High Constable the same year.

In 1602–1603, together with Arvid Stålarm, he held supreme command of the Swedish forces in Livonia, was back in Sweden in 1604, and served as field commander in the 1605 campaign. He then marched with 4,000 men from Tallinn to Pärnu, where Charles IX had landed, and then accompanied the monarch on his march south. After a brilliant display of bravery, he fell on 17 September 1603 in the battle of Kirkholm. Before the battle, the experienced warrior, had advised the Charles to postpone the attack due to the fatigue of the troops.

== Manor ==
Anders Lennartsson owned the Restad manor in Vänersborg in Älvsborg County, Västergötland.
