= Dole Manor =

Manor house in Latvia

Coordinates: 56.8480°N 24.2283°E

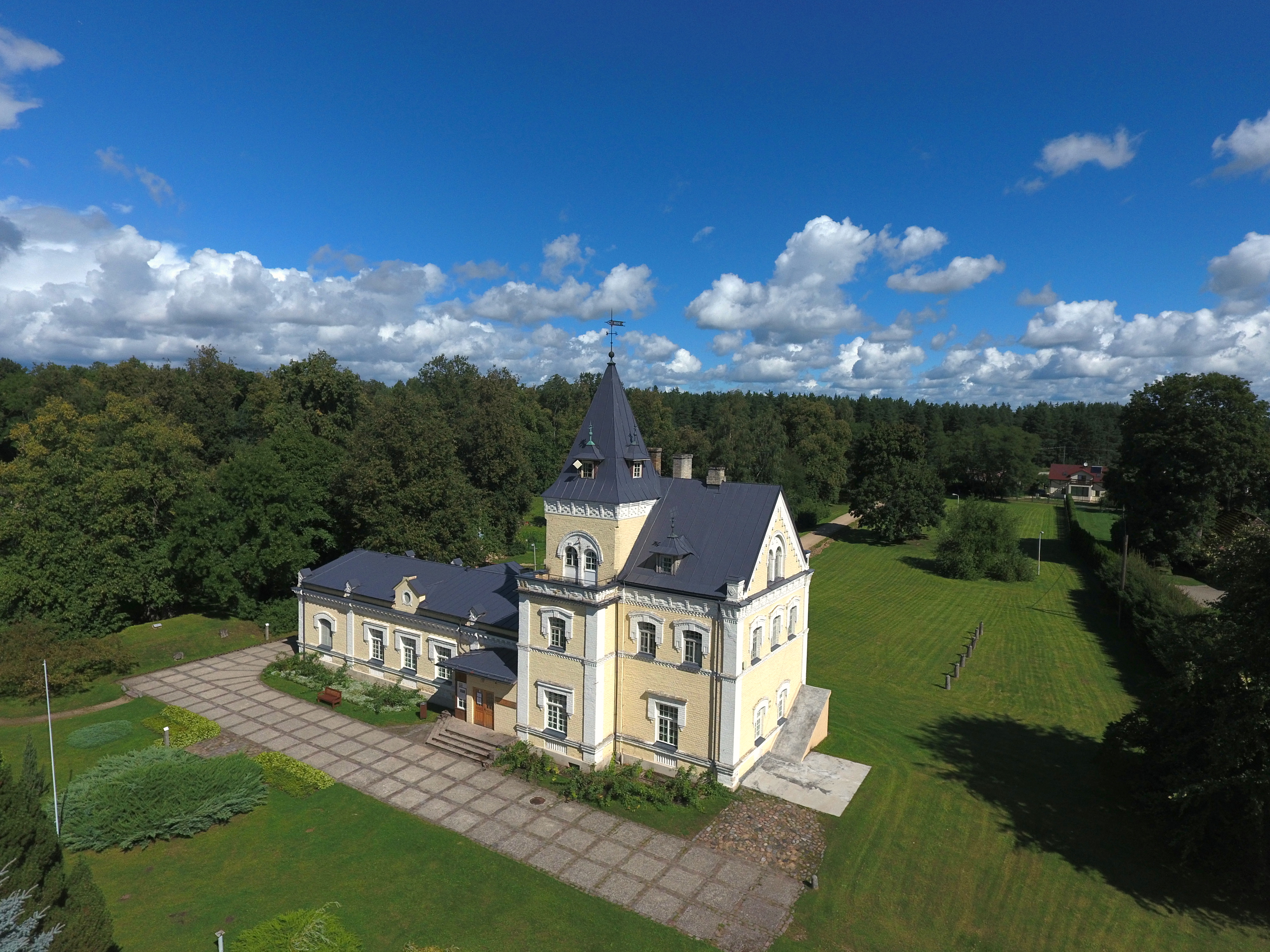
- Interactive map of the Dole Manor area

General information
- Architectural style: Historicism
- Location: Salaspils municipality, Latvia
- Completed: 1898
- Client: von Lowis of Menar family

Dole Manor (Latvian: Doles muižas pils; German: Schloss Dahlen) is a manor house on Dole Island in the Daugava River, in the Salaspils Parish of Salaspils Municipality in the Vidzeme region of Latvia, not far from Riga.

== History ==
The first owner of the estate was Swedish army Colonel Nikolauss Deetrih Sperreuter in 1631. The current manor was built in 1898 in Neo-Romantic style. After 1921 it housed a primary school, after 1954 a fishermen's club. Since 1977 the Daugava River Museum has been located in the manor house.

== See also ==
- List of palaces and manor houses in Latvia
