= Battle of Kircholm =

1605 battle of the Polish–Swedish War of 1600–11

Coordinates: 56°50′55″N 24°20′53″E

- Part of the Polish–Swedish War (1600–1611)
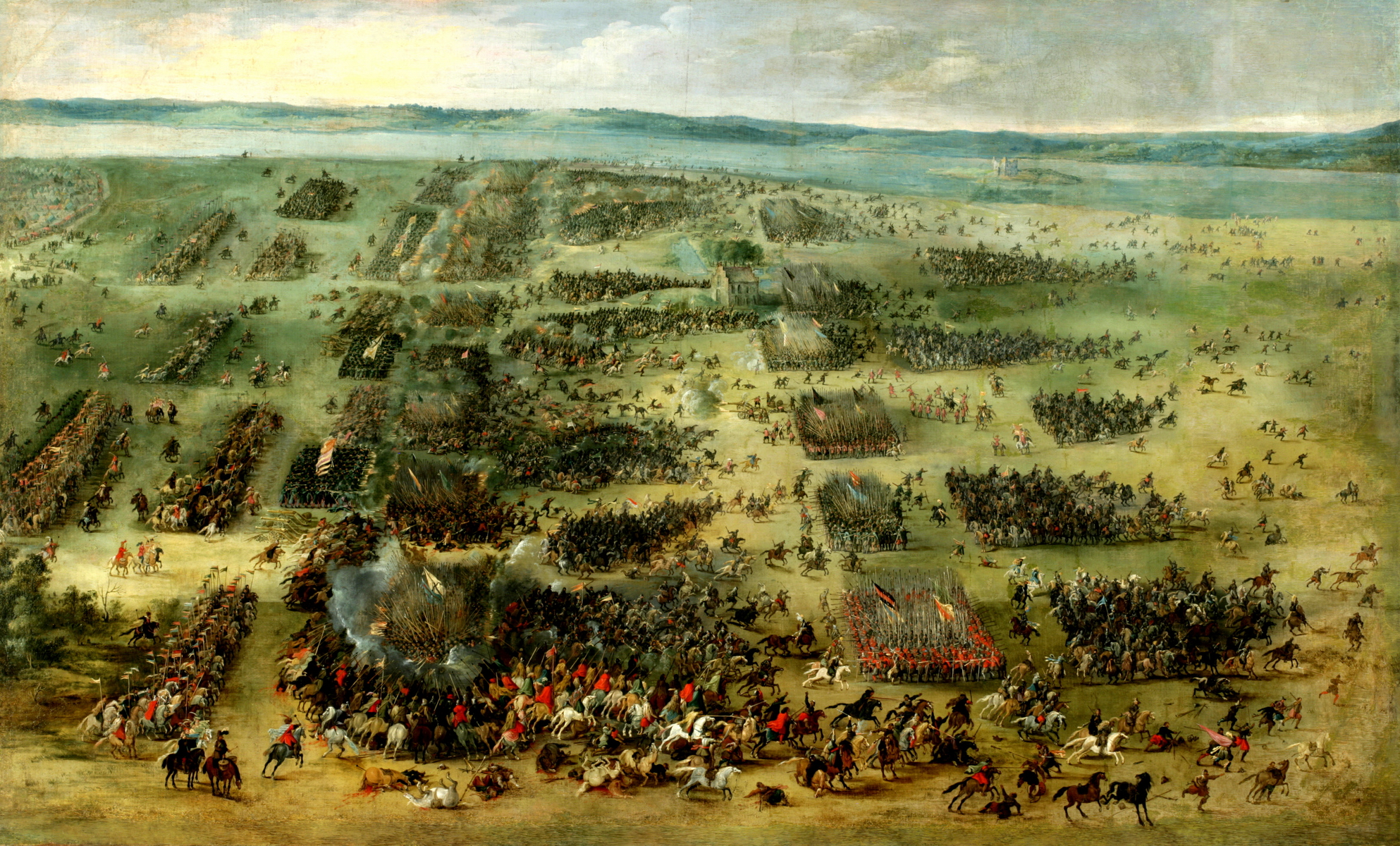
- Battle of Kircholm by Peter Snayers, 1620s
Date	27 September [O.S. 17 September] 1605
Location	Kircholm, present-day Salaspils, Latvia
Result	Polish-Lithuanian victory

Belligerents
(Polish–Lithuanian Commonwealth) Poland–Lithuania	Sweden

Commanders and leaders
Jan Karol Chodkiewicz; Jan Piotr Sapieha	Charles IX; Anders Lennartsson †

Strength
3,600, 5 guns	10,868, 11 guns

Casualties and losses
300 killed or wounded	c. 8,000 killed, wounded, or captured

The Battle of Kircholm (Note: Lithuanian: Salaspilio mūšis; Polish: Bitwa pod Kircholmem; Swedish: Slaget vid Kirkholm) took place on 27 September [O.S. 17 September] 1605 during the Polish–Swedish War (1600–1611) near Kircholm, now Salaspils in Latvia. A Swedish expedition besieging Riga was defeated by a smaller Polish–Lithuanian Commonwealth relief force and abandoned the attempt.

== Background ==
On 17 September 1605, the Commonwealth and Swedish forces met near the small town of Kircholm (now Salaspils in Latvia, some 18 kilometres (11 mi) south-east of Riga). The forces of Charles IX of Sweden were numerically superior and were composed of 10,868 men and 11 cannon. The Swedish army included two western commanders, Frederick of Lüneburg and Count Joachim Frederick of Mansfeld, with a few thousand German and Dutch mercenaries and even a few hundred Scots.

The Polish Crown declined to raise funds for defence and send troops, only making promises they never fulfilled. The army, led by the Great Hetman of Lithuania Jan Karol Chodkiewicz, was tired and starving; however, the soldiers admired their leader. He promised to pay army wages from his own fortune, resulting in an influx of recruits from Lithuania. The Polish–Lithuanian Commonwealth army under Chodkiewicz was composed of roughly 1,000 infantry and 2,600 cavalry, but only five cannons. However, the Polish-Lithuanian forces were well-rested, and their cavalry consisted mostly of superbly trained Winged Hussars, or heavy cavalry armed with lances. In contrast, the Swedish cavalry were less-well trained, armed with pistols and carbines, on poorer horses and tired after a long night's march of over 10 km in torrential rain. The Polish-Lithuanian forces had a small number of Lithuanian Tatar and Cossack mercenaries, used mostly for reconnaissance.

== Deployment ==
Position of both armies prior to Polish-Lithuanian attack

The Swedish forces seem to have been deployed in a checkerboard formation, made up of the infantry regiments formed into seven or eight well-spaced independent blocks, with intersecting fields of fire. The flanks were to be covered by the Swedish and German cavalry, and the cannons were placed in front of the cavalry. Charles' force was formed into four lines on the crest of a ridge. The first line consisted of four infantry battalions, cavalry in the second line, six infantry battalions in the third line, and cavalry in the fourth line. The infantry battalions formed in squares of 30 by 30, with pikemen in the center and shot on the edges, and gaps between the squares allowed passage of their cavalry.

Jan Karol Chodkiewicz deployed his forces in the traditional deep Polish battle formation—the so-called "Old Polish Order"—with the left wing significantly stronger and commanded by Tomasz Dąbrowa, while the right wing was composed of a smaller number of hussars under Jan Piotr Sapieha, and the center included Hetman Chodkiewicz's own company of 300 hussars led by Lt. Wincenty Woyna and a powerful formation of reiters sent by the Duke of Courland Friedrich Kettler. The Polish-Lithuanian infantry, mostly armed in Hungarian hajduk-style, drew up in the center. Some 280 hussars were left as a general reserve under Teodor Lacki.

== Battle ==
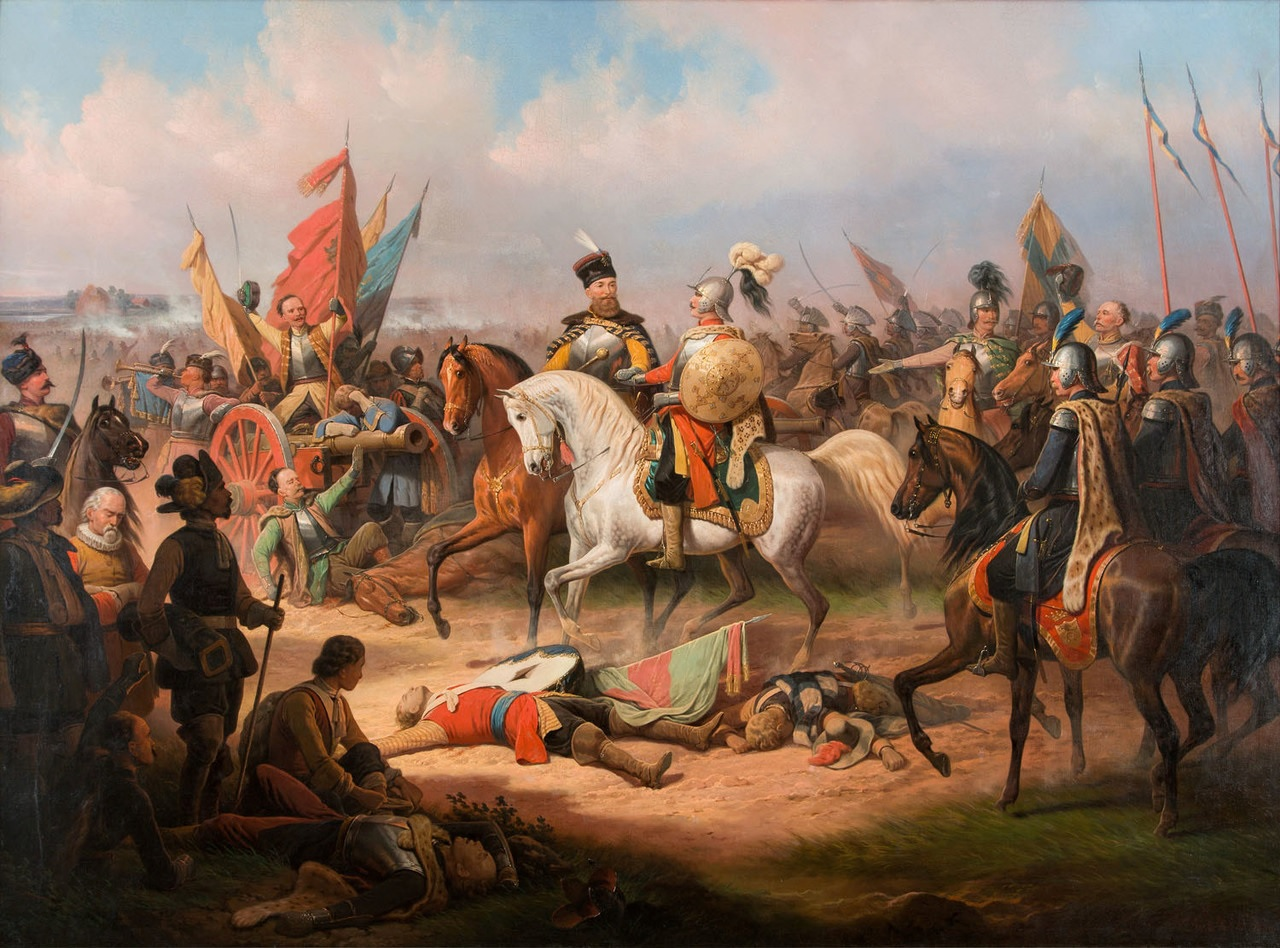
The Krikholme Battlefield by January Suchodolski

Chodkiewicz tried for hours to lure the Swedes from their positions with his light cavalry sent out to skirmish between the two armies. Chodkiewicz, having smaller forces (approximately a 1:3 disadvantage), used a feint to lure the Swedes off their high position, pretending to withdraw. The Swedes under Charles thought that the Polish-Lithuanian troops were retreating and therefore advanced to the bottom of the slope, using their second line of cavalry to cover their flanks while the first line of infantry closed up. This is what Chodkiewicz was waiting for. The Commonwealth forces now gave fire with Kettlers' Curonian harquebusiers while Wincenty Wojna's hussars charged at the Swedish lines, causing disorder in the infantry.

The main battle started with the Polish-Lithuanian cavalry charge on the Swedish right flank, with about 1,000 hussars shattering Mansfield's reiters and disordering the Swedish third infantry line in their retreat. At the same time, on the Swedish left, 650 hussars under Sapieha charged. After Charles sent in his reserve of 700 cavalry, Chodkiewicz sent in his reserves. The entire force of Swedish cavalry was finally put to rout, and in their flight, disordered many of their own infantry, leaving them vulnerable to the hussars' charge.

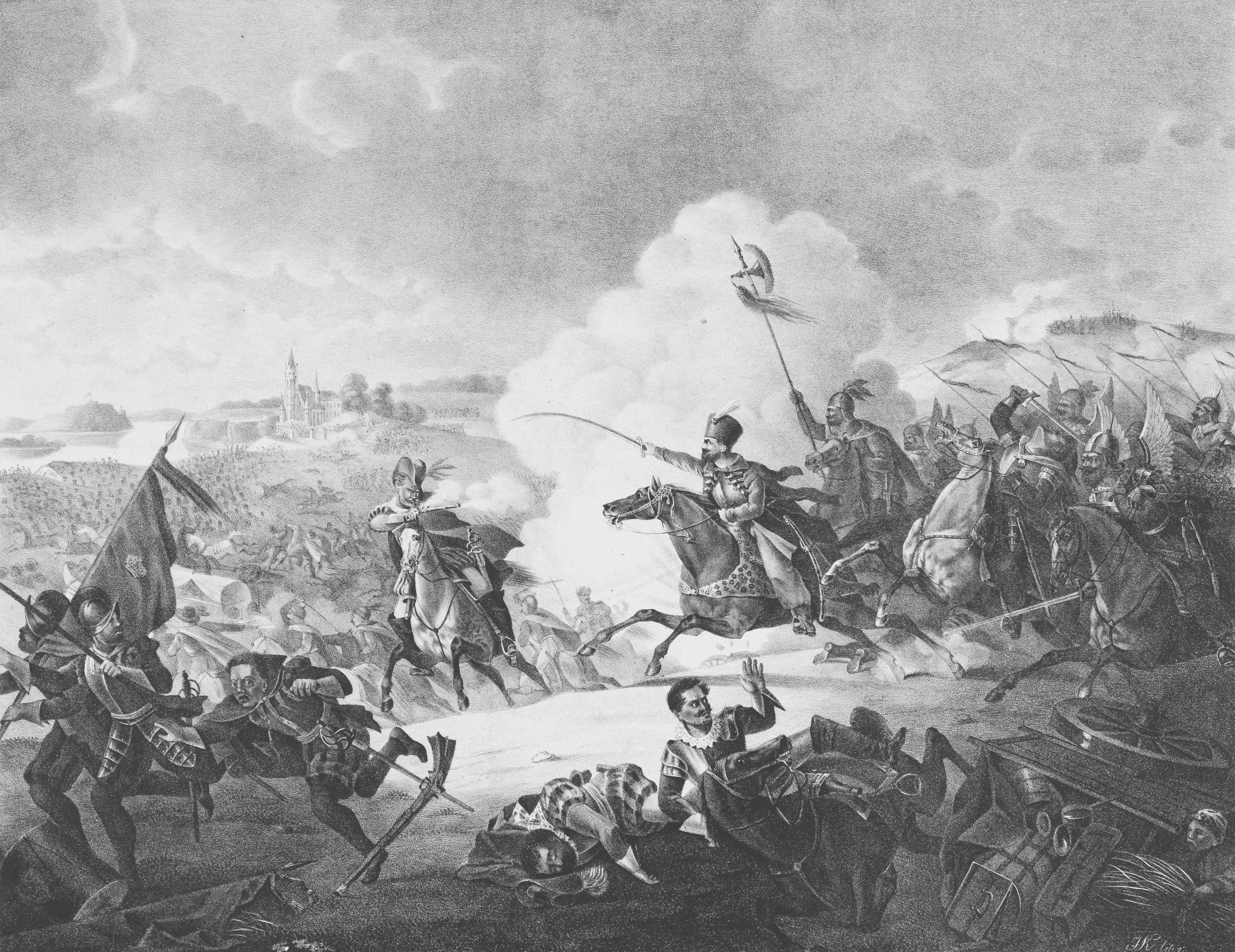
Polish-Lithuanian cavalry charge

Within 30 minutes, the Swedish cavalry was in full retreat on both flanks exposing the infantry in the centre to the hussars and the firepower of Chodkiewicz's infantry. The Swedish defeat was utter and complete. The army of Charles IX had lost at least 5,000 killed and 500 captured, or up to 7,600–8,000 killed, captured, and dispersed. The Polish-Lithuanian losses numbered only about 100 dead and 200 wounded, although the hussars, in particular, lost a large part of their trained battle horses.

During the retreat, Charles IX's horse was shot from under him. At the risk of being surrounded and killed, Henrik Wrede a Swedish cavalry officer arrived and offered the king his horse. The king escaped on it leaving Wrede stranded. Wrede was subsequently surrounded and killed.

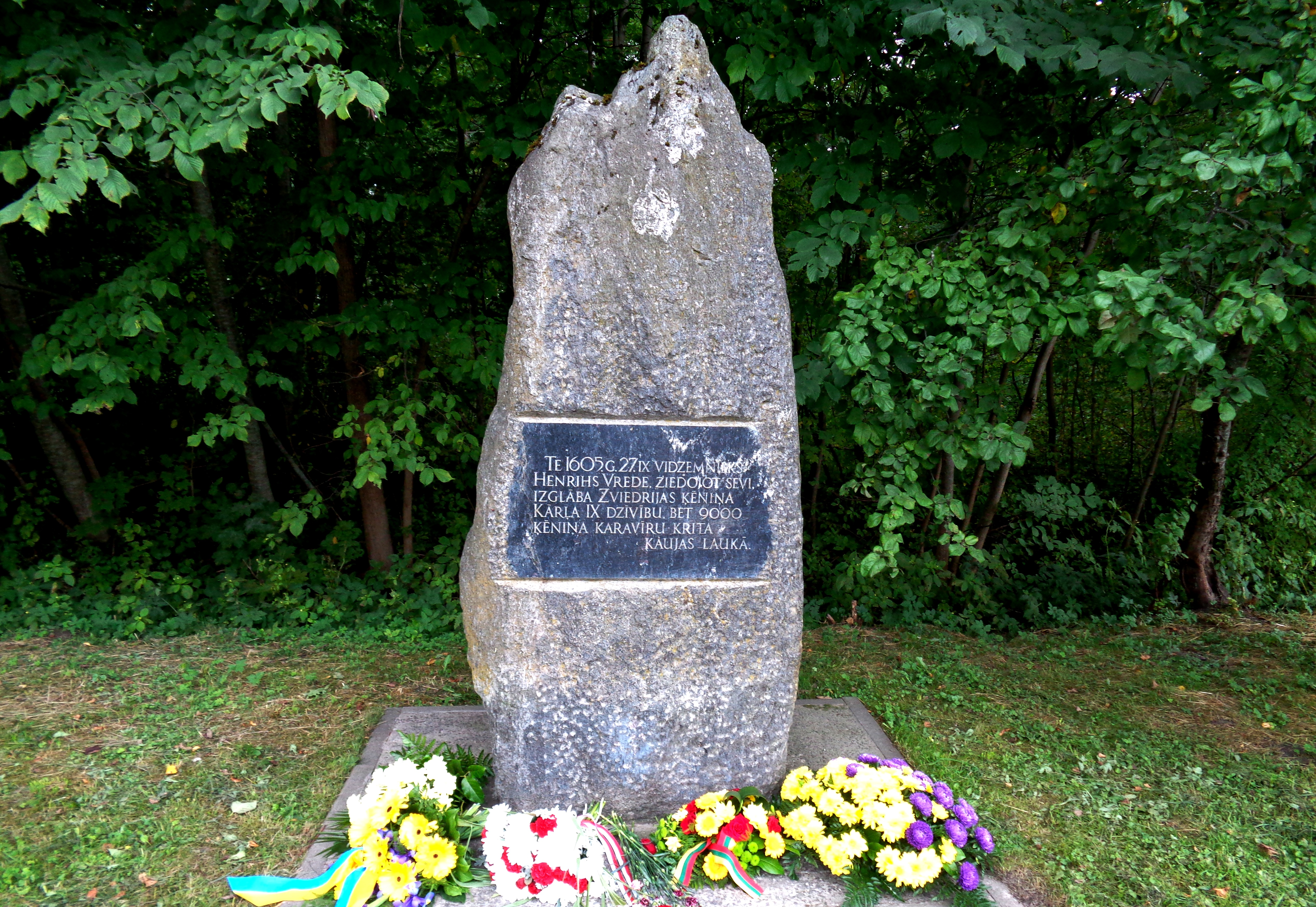
A memorial stone in Salaspils (formerly Kircholm), Latvia, commemorating Henrik Wrede's sacrifice.

As in all crushing victories in this period, the larger part of the Swedish losses were suffered during the retreat, made more difficult by the dense forests and marshes on the route back to Riga, many drowning crossing the Dvina. The Poles and Lithuanians spared few. Polish-Lithuanian casualties were light, in large part due to the speed of the victory. During the hussar's charges, it was the horses that took the greatest damage, the riders being largely protected by the body and heads of their horses.

== Aftermath ==
After the defeat, the Swedish king was forced to abandon the siege of Riga and withdraw by ship back across the Baltic Sea to Sweden, and to relinquish control of northern Latvia and Estonia. However, the Commonwealth proved unable to exploit the victory fully because there was no money for the troops, who had not been paid for months. Without pay, they could not buy food or fodder for their horses or replenish their military supplies, and so the campaign faltered. An additional factor was the large number of trained horses lost during the battle, which proved difficult to replace.

A truce was eventually signed in 1611, but by 1617 war broke out again, and finally, in 1621, the new Swedish king, Gustavus Adolphus, landed near Riga and took the city with a brief siege, wiping away – in Swedish eyes – much of the shame suffered at Kircholm.

== Commemoration ==
The Battle of Kircholm is commemorated on the Tomb of the Unknown Soldier, Warsaw, with the inscription "KIRCHOLM 27 IX 1605".

== Sources ==
- Podhorodecki, Leszek (1985). Rapier i Koncerz (in Polish). Książka i Wiedza. ISBN 83-05-11452-X.
- Šapoka, Adolfas (1936). Lietuvos istorija (in Lithuanian). Švietimo Ministerijos Knygų Leidimo Komisijos Leidinys. OCLC 8122151.
- Barkman, Bertil C:son (1939). Kungl. Svea Livgardes Historia (in Swedish). Vol. bd. II: 1560–1611. OCLC 929311731.
- Brzezinski, Richard; Vukšić, Velimir (2006). Polish Winged Hussar 1576–1775. Osprey Publishing. ISBN 9781841766508.
- Frost, Robert I. (2000). The Northern Wars, 1558–1721. Pearson Education Limited. ISBN 978-0-582-06429-4.
- Sundberg, Ulf (2002). Svenska krig 1521–1814 (2 ed.). Stockholm: Hjalmarson & Högberg. ISBN 9189660102.
