= Vecdole Castle =

Castle in Latvia

Coordinates: 56.8606°N 24.2522°E

- Vidzeme, Latvia
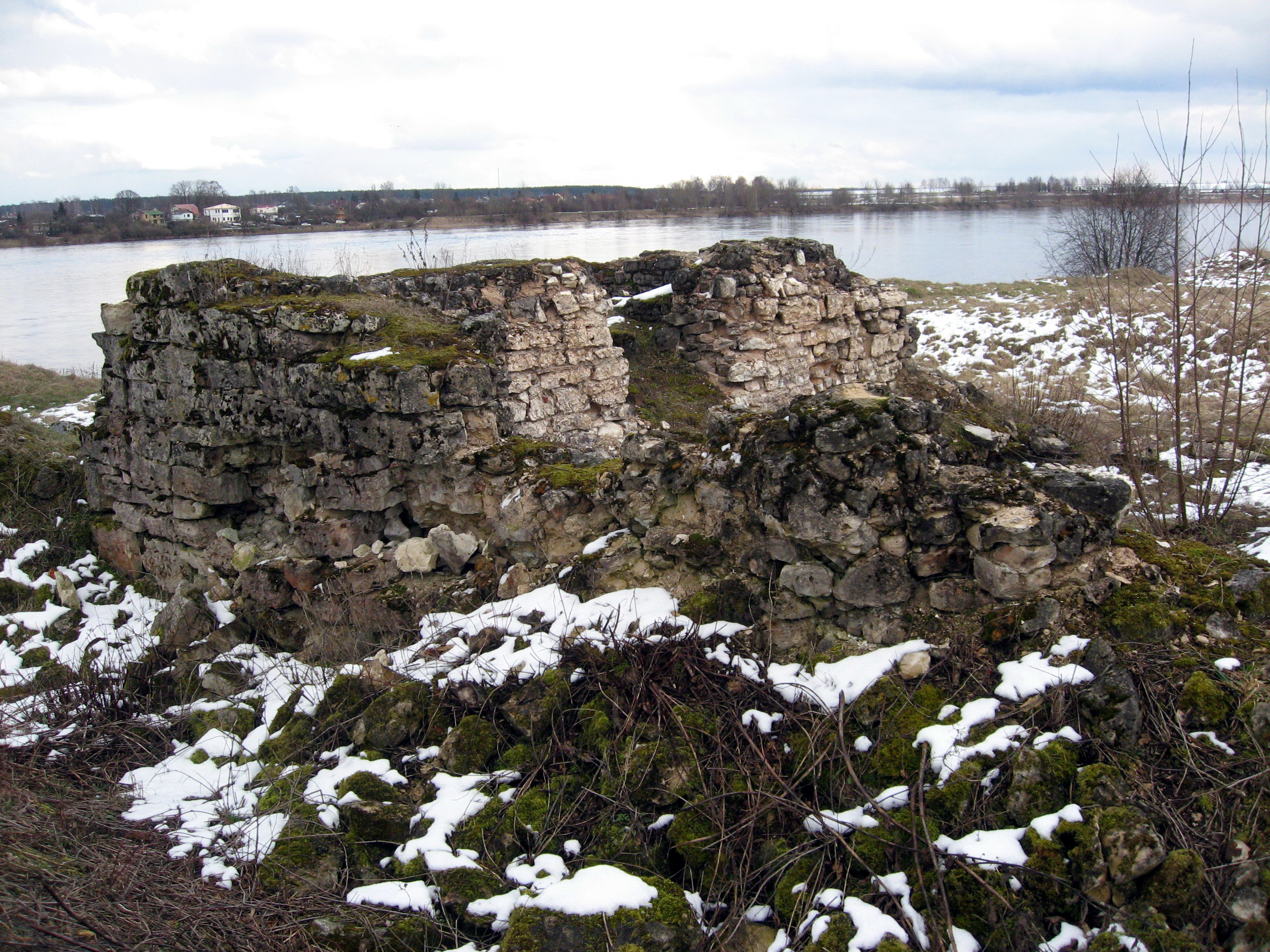

Site information
- Type: Castle
- Condition: Ruins

Vecdole Castle (German: Schloss Alt-Dahlen) is a castle on the Daugava River in the Salaspils Parish of Salaspils Municipality, in the Vidzeme region of Latvia. Built before 1226, today only ruins remain.

== See also ==
- List of castles in Latvia
