= Buļļu sala =

Island in Riga, Latvia

Bullu Sala
Native name: Daugavgrīvas Sala
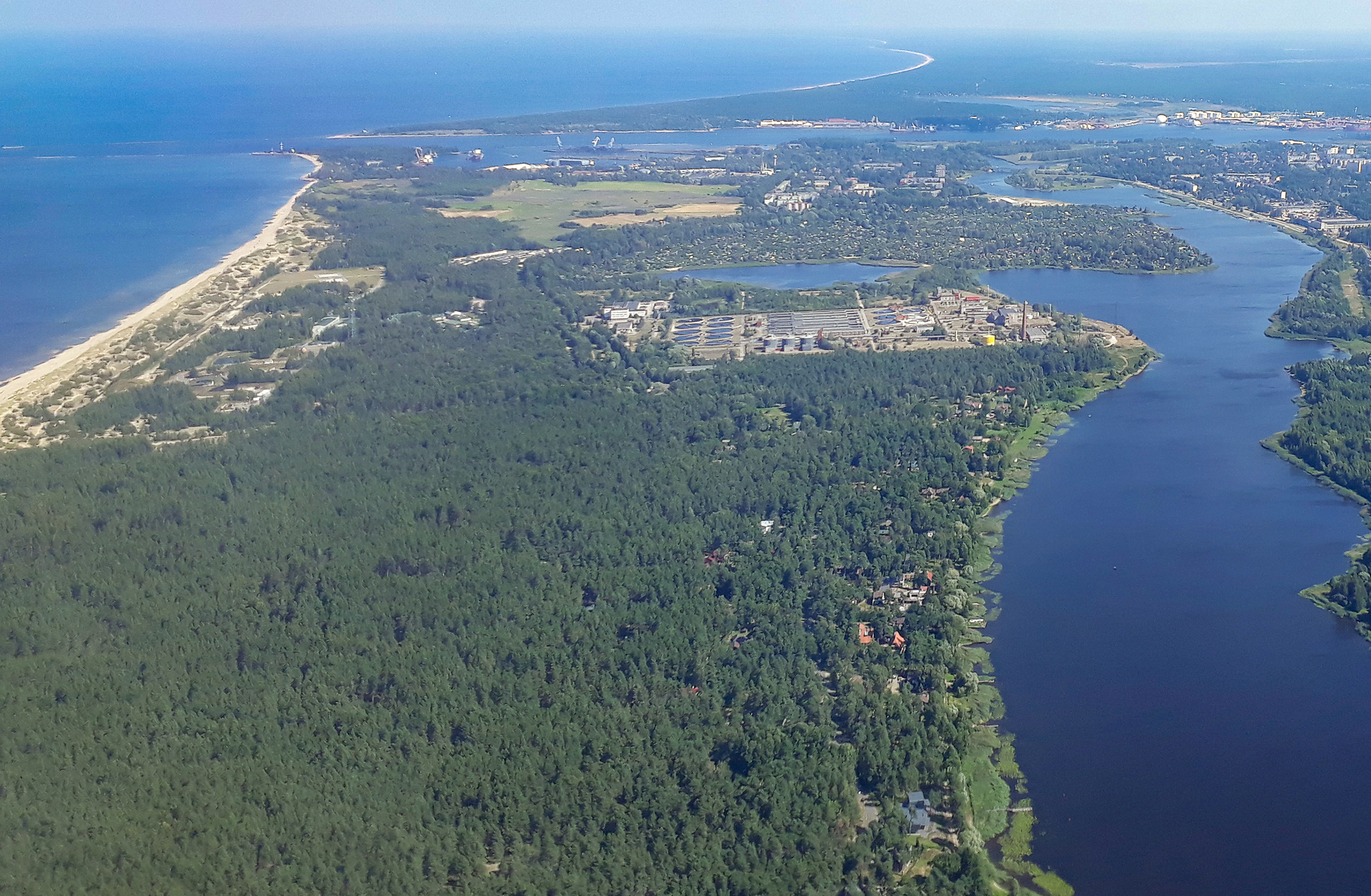
- Buļļu sala in 2022
- Interactive map of Bullu Sala

Geography
- Location: Latvia
- Coordinates: 57°02′N 24°00′E

Administration
- Latvia

Buļļu Sala (also known as Daugavgrīvas Sala) is an island in the Kurzeme District of Riga, Latvia.

== See also ==
- List of islands of Latvia
- Beach on the north coast of the island
