= Krūmiņsala =

Island in Riga, Latvia

- Interactive map of Krūmiņsala

Geography
- Location: Daugava River
- Coordinates: 56°54′26″N 24°09′34″E

Administration
- Latvia

Krūmiņsala ('Shrub Island') is a small island located in Latvia's capital city of Riga. It is located in the downstream of the Daugava, on the left coast near the border of the city.

The island is located across the mouth of the River Olekte. Krūmiņsala is a part of the neighborhood of Katlakalns. It is 0.5 km long and 0.14 km wide, with an average height of 2-2,5 metres above the water level of Daugava.

The island is uninhabited, covered with trees and shrubs. As a separate island, Krūmiņsala has existed at least since the mid-17th century.

It is possible to reach the island by means of a boat berth installed in the summer of 2020. Cultural events have been held on the island since 2021 by the organizers of the Sansusī chamber music festival.
