= Teodor Lacki =

- Died: 1619
- Noble family: Lacki
- Spouse: Izabela Bonarelli de Roeve (it. Isabella Bonarelli della Rovere)
- Issue: Katarzyna, Jan Alfons

Teodor Lacki (died 1619) – Hussar rotmistrz, Lithuanian field writer (lat. notarius campestris), and alchemist.

== Biography ==
Lacki came from the Lacki noble family based in the area of Troki (now Trakai, Lithuania). The family originated in the Grand Duchy of Moscow and Teodor was related to the boyar Ivan Lacki, who had fled Moscow in 1535 with Siemion Bielski and entered the service of the king of Poland.

Teodor Lacki traveled a great deal. He spent 1584-86 in Italy, and later went to France, Germany, the Netherlands, and Malta. While in Rome in 1589, Lacki worked with Michael Sendivogius on alchemical experiments to turn copper into silver.

He began his military service during the reign of Stefan Báthory and fought in the Livonian Wars under Sigismund III Vasa. For his efforts in the wars, Lacki was rewarded with an appointment as the Lithuanian field writer and an income. He supported the king's side in the Zebrzydowski Rebellion.

Lacki married Izabela de Roeve, daughter of Petras Bonarelli de Roeve (it. Pietro Bonarelli della Rovere). They had two children together: a daughter, Katarzyna, who later married Teodor Tyszkiewicz; and a son, Jan Alfons Lacki, later the castellan of Minsk.

Teodor Lacki died in 1619.
