= Doles sala =

Island in Latvia

Doles Sala
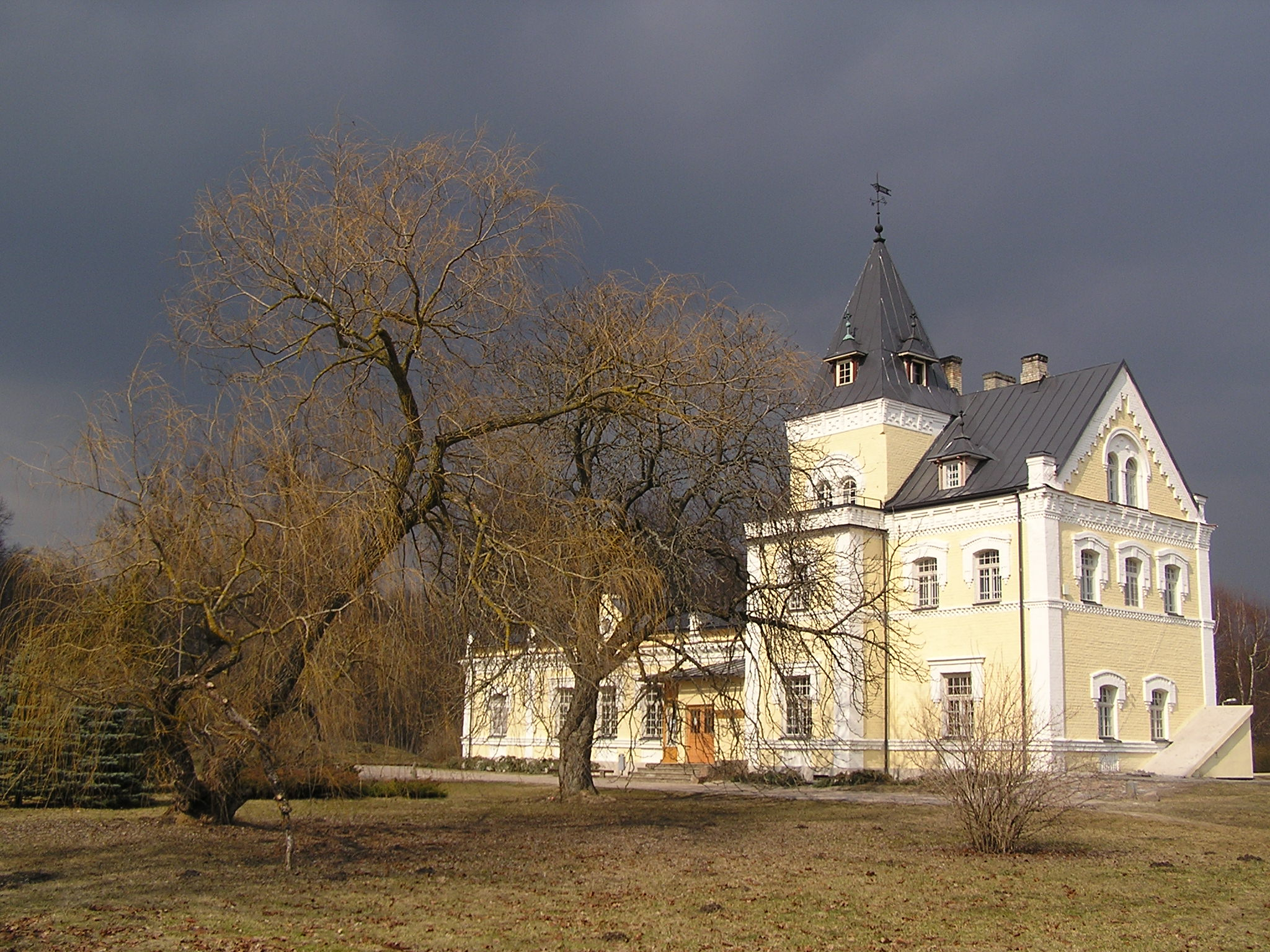
- Daugava Museum in Doles Sala
- Interactive map of Doles Sala

Geography
- Location: Daugava River, Latvia
- Coordinates: 56°51′30″N 24°14′00″E
- Area: 1,044 ha (2,580 acres)

Administration
- Latvia

Demographics
- Pop. density: 4/km^{2} (10/sq mi)

Doles Sala is a peninsula in the Daugava River, near the borders of Riga. There is an old mansion on Doles Sala, which now serves as the Daugava Museum.

== History ==
There is a theory that German knights settled in Doles Sala even before the city of Riga was founded, but this is unproven.

There once was a great-oak on Doles Sala. It was the third biggest oak in Latvia.

Doles Sala was previously an island, and also larger, until construction of Riga HES flooded it. Some sources list it as the second largest island in Latvia, with an area of 1044 ha. However, Riga HES made Doles Sala into a peninsula.

President of Latvia Vaira Vīķe-Freiberga planted a linden tree on Doles Sala in 2004 on the day when Latvia became European Union member state.

== Geography ==
There are rare dolomite outcrops in Doles Sala, which were made by the now not existing river Lebjava.

== Parks and museums ==
In 1987, the Doles Sala national park was founded.

There is an old mansion on Doles Sala, which now serves as the Daugava Museum.

== See also ==
- List of islands of Latvia
