= Salaspils =

Town and capital of Salaspils Municipality, Latvia

Salaspils Kircholm, Kerkolm
- Town
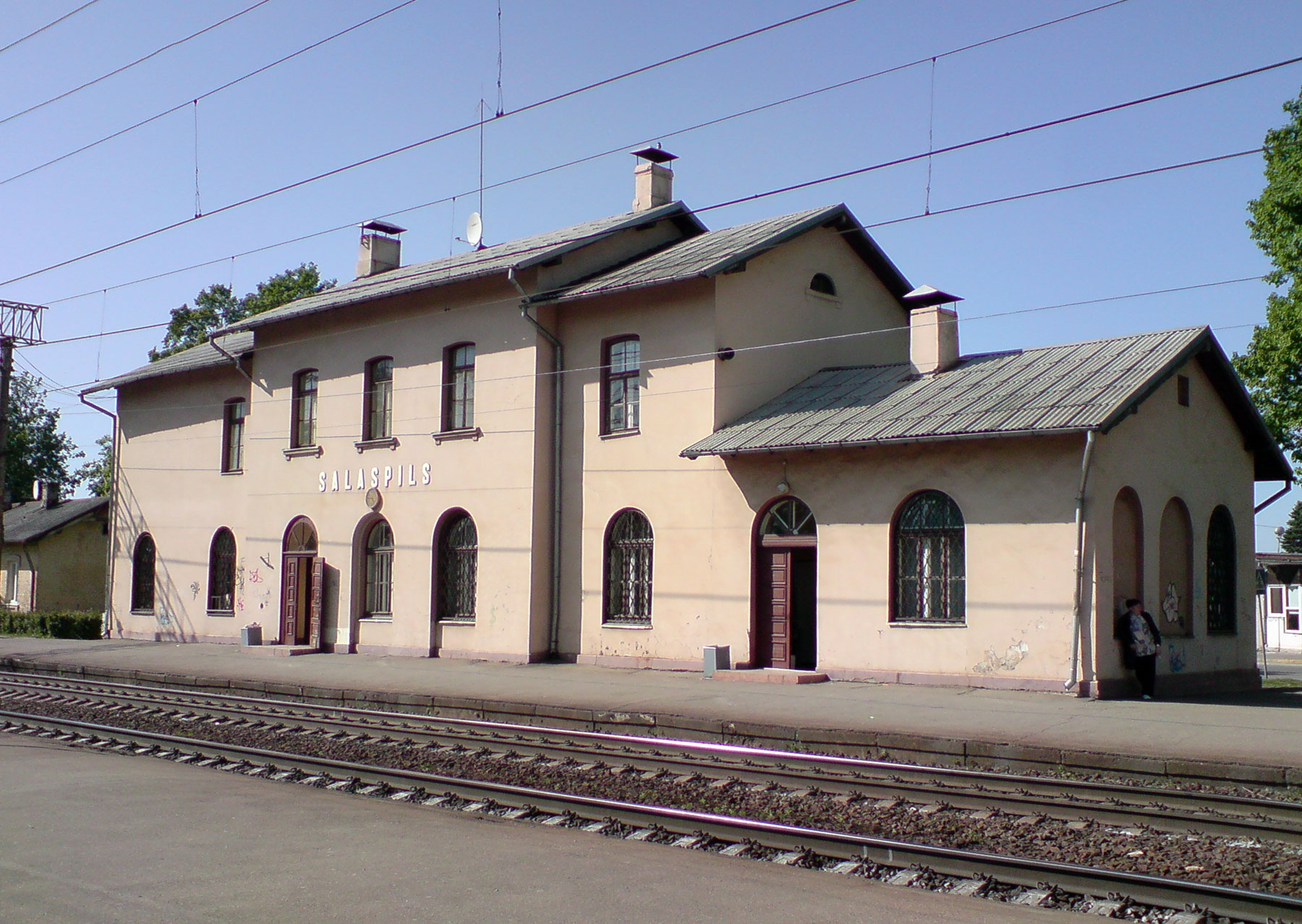
- Salaspils Railway Station in 2008

- Coat of arms

- Location in Latvia
- Coordinates: 56°52′N 24°21′E
- Country: Latvia
- District: Salaspils Municipality
- Town rights: 1993

Government
  - Mayor: Raivis Anspaks

Area
  - Total: 15.11 km^{2} (5.83 sq mi)
  - Land: 14.56 km^{2} (5.62 sq mi)
  - Water: 0.55 km^{2} (0.21 sq mi)

Population (2026)
  - Total: 17,817
  - Density: 1,224/km^{2} (3,169/sq mi)
- Time zone: UTC+2 (EET)
  - Summer (DST): UTC+3 (EEST)
- Postal code: LV-2121; LV-2169
- Calling code: +371 67
- Number of city council members: 13
- Website: http://www.salaspils.lv/en/

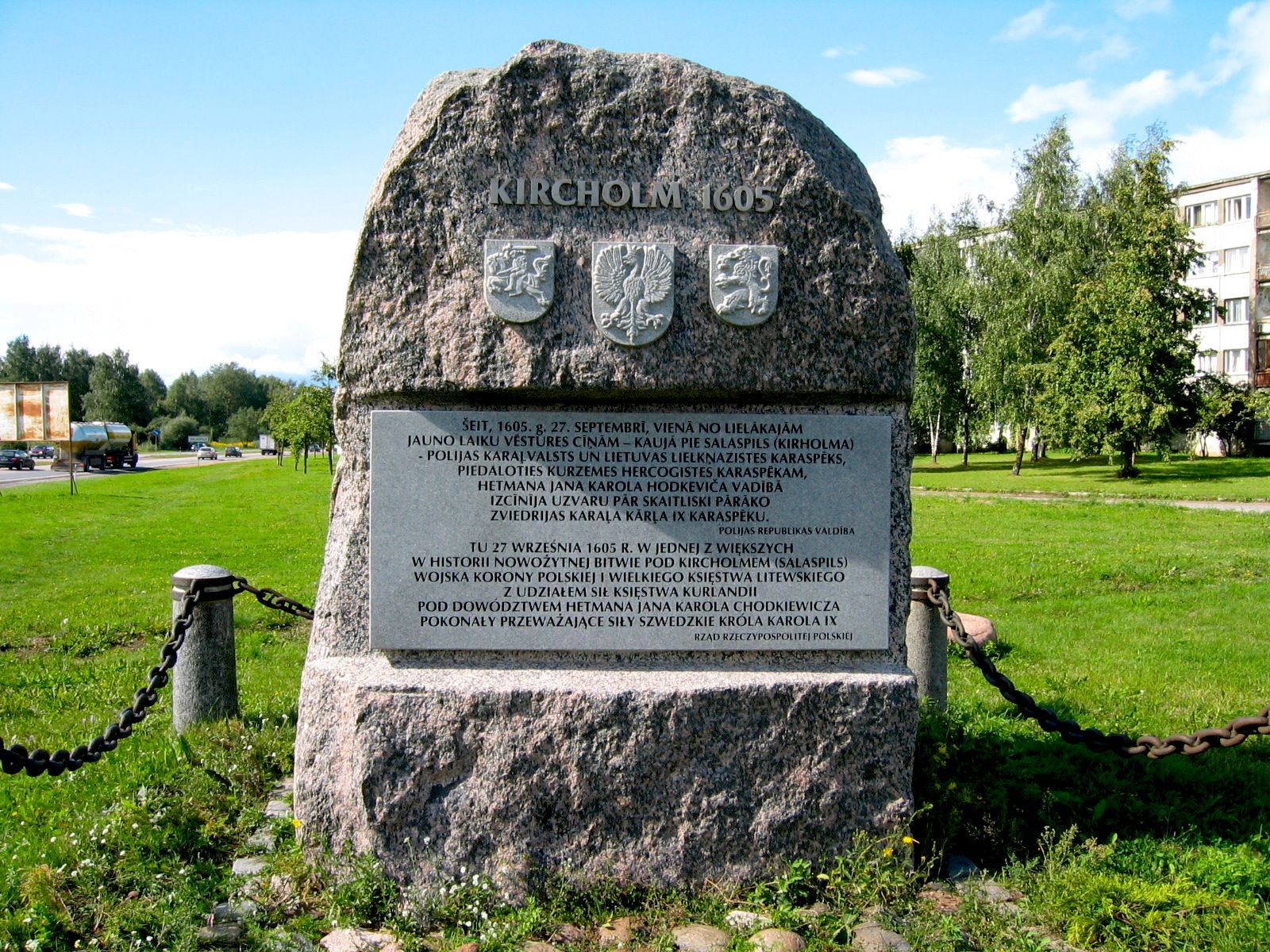
The Battle of Kircholm monument at Salaspils. In 1605 joint Polish–Lithuanian–Courland armies defeated an invading Swedish army here.

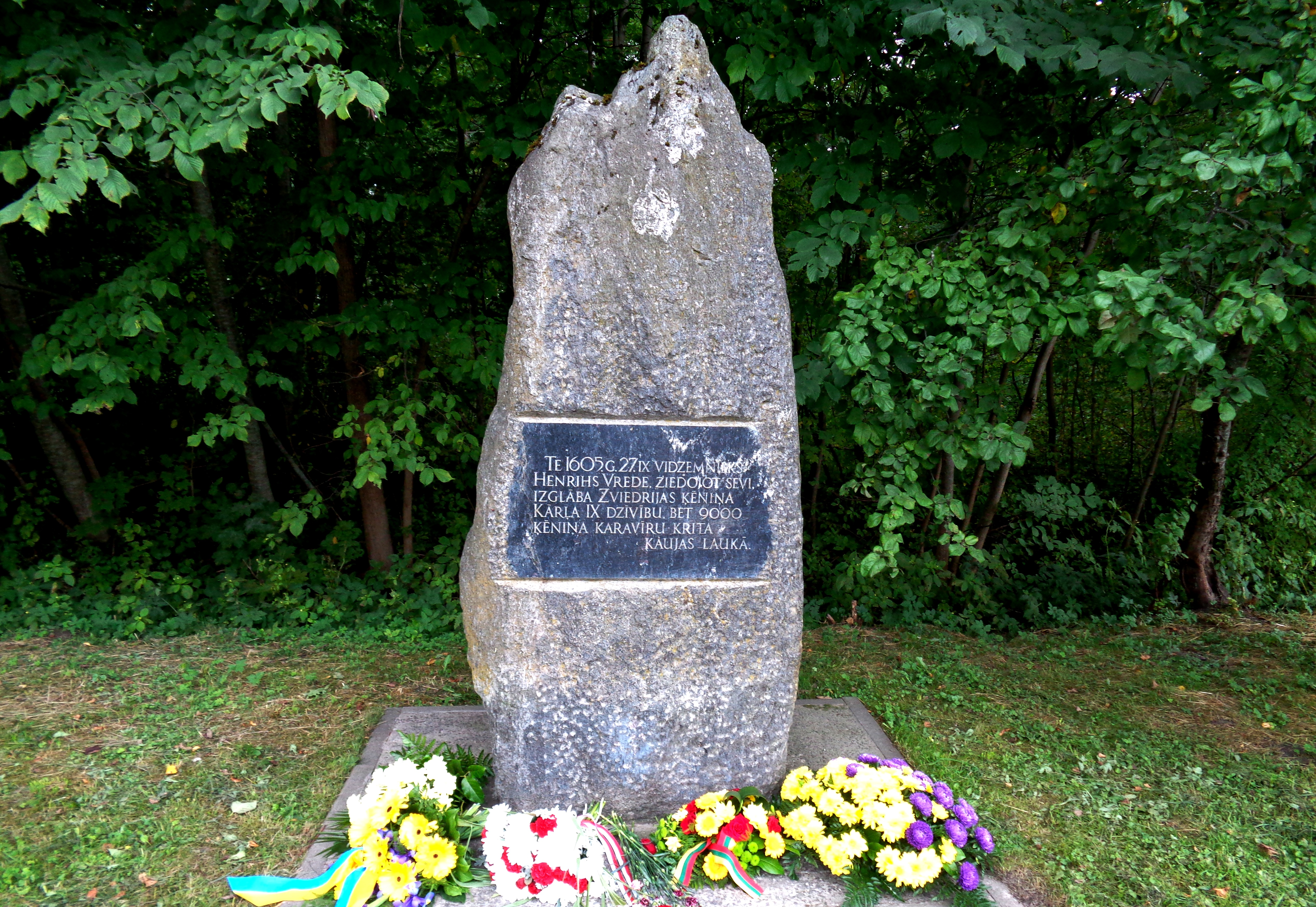
Battle of Kircholm Stone (other memorial) in Salaspils, Latvia

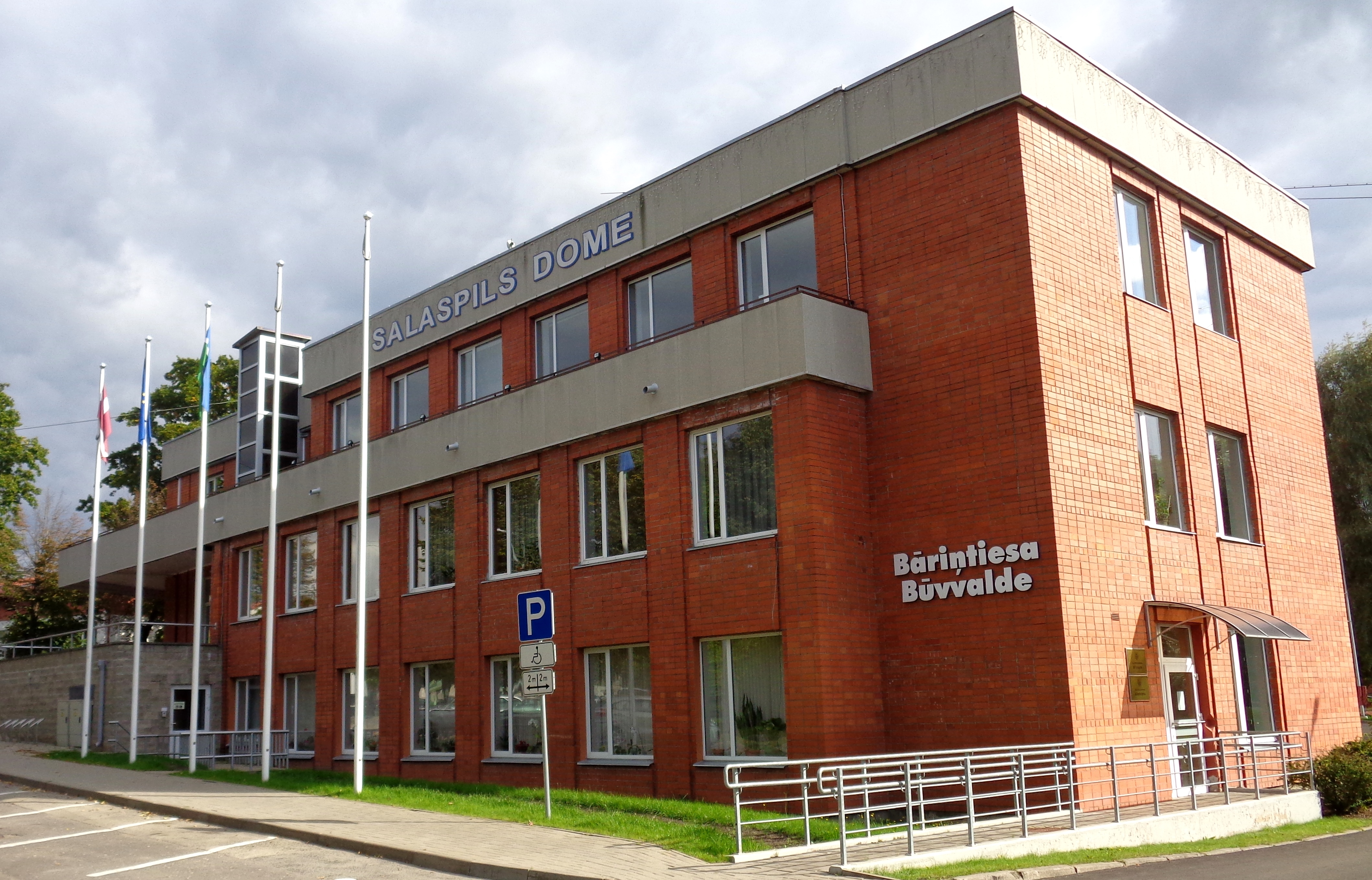
Salaspils Council

Salaspils (German: Kircholm; Swedish: Kirkholm) (literally: "island castle") is a town in the Vidzeme region of Latvia. It is the administrative centre of Salaspils Municipality. The town is situated on the northern bank of the Daugava river, 18 kilometers to the south-east of the city of Riga.

== History ==
Salaspils is one of the oldest settlements in Latvia. Archaeological excavations of 1964–1975 (during the construction of Riga HES) in ancient settlements, burial grounds and castle mounds give evidence of very dense population of the region. At this time, the remains of 11,000-year-old reindeer hunters were found (the oldest known human settlement in all of Latvia) and 3500-year-old remains of Baltic hunters, buried in hollowed-out oak-tree trunks, were found as well. There is evidence that both Livs and Balts built hill forts in the region.

At the end of the 12th century, German merchants travelled up the Daugava, establishing missionaries among the Livonian settlements. One important centre of Daugava Livonians, the small island Mārtiņsala (German:Kircholm) had a Christian church as early as 1186. So began the Christianizing and gradual subjection of the local Livonian tribes. In 1206, in the early phases of the Livonian Crusade, the Livonian chieftain Ako organized the first revolt against the German crusaders but suffered defeat.

The Latvian name of the Salaspils "island castle" is probably derived from Mārtiņsala Island castle, but the Germanized name Kircholm – from the Mārtiņsala Island church. Both names were used when referring to the territory on the northern bank of the Daugava.

In 1380 the Livonian Order built the castle (Neu-Kircholm) on the mainland, with St George's church by it. The castle was an important support-point outside of Riga, and a small town grew up around it. Both the castle and village were destroyed in 1577 during the Livonian War.

In 1605 the village was a site of the Battle of Kircholm in which forces of the Polish–Lithuanian Commonwealth defeated a much more numerous army of Sweden. This was the biggest battle of the Polish–Swedish War. The battle took place near St George's church and about 9000 Swedish soldiers were buried there. Two memorial stones in Salaspils commemorate of one of the biggest battles in Europe in the 17th century – in memory of the victory of the Polish–Lithuanian forces. Up to the second part of the 20th century a magnificent 17th century military fortification near the Daugava – the Swedish rampart. The destroyed church was renovated in 1631, but later – in 1896 and 1923 - rebuilt.

In the 17th–19th century the surrounding area of Salaspils was governed by the Salaspils Estate which, was established near the destroyed Order's castle and was a part of Riga since 1630, and the Kurtes Estate which was situated in the territory of present Līvzemes street in Salaspils.

The Riga–Daugavpils railway opened in 1861, and the new center of the town developed near Salaspils station just opposite the Kurtes Estate. In the second part of the 19th century, military summer camps were organized in the territory of Salaspils and an Orthodox church was built into a garrison. During the World War I, the front line was at Salaspils for two years, and many of the buildings and farmsteads, especially along the river, were destroyed. The infamous battles at Nāves Sala and Mazā Jugla were fought nearby.

During the first Republic of Latvia there were three parishes in Salaspils territory – Stopiņi, Salaspils (Ķesterciems) and Dole.

=== World War II ===
In 1941, during World War II, German Nazi authorities established the largest civilian concentration camp in the Baltic states 2 km northwest of the town of Salaspils. The Latvian historian Heinrihs Strods and the German Holocaust historians Andrej Angrick and Peter Klein estimate the number of deaths at Salaspils at 2,000–3,000 in total, including children. At the site of the camp, a major monument complex in remembrance of the Soviet victims of Nazism was opened on 31 October 1967.

In addition, the Wehrmacht operated two sub-camps for Soviet prisoners of war near Salaspils (Zweiglager-1 and Zweiglager-2), both part of Stalag 350. The exact numbers of those who died at these two camps is the subject of ongoing debate, but is nowadays estimated at about 1000.

Claims made by Soviet historians that over 100,000 people were killed in Salaspils during the German occupation are nowadays classified as propaganda. According to Latvian historian Aivars Stranga, the controversial 2006 Russian book Latvia Under The Yoke of Nazism revives Soviet-era myths which Holocaust researchers have long since deconstructed.

=== City growth in the 1950s and 1960s ===
During the late 1950s and early 1960s, various industrial enterprises and governmental institutions developed in Salaspils, such as the nuclear plant and four branches of the Academy of Science. Large multi-storied housing blocks appeared to house incoming power plant workers, many of whom were Russians. In a few decades Salaspils transformed from a very peaceful rural settlement to a mikroraion-style town. Due to the rapid development, Soviet authorities ordered construction of the Riga HES and Riga TEC-2. The dam created a massive reservoir that flooded monuments of Salaspils ancient history. The last unsubmerged sections of old Salaspils have been preserved near the Salaspils railway station.

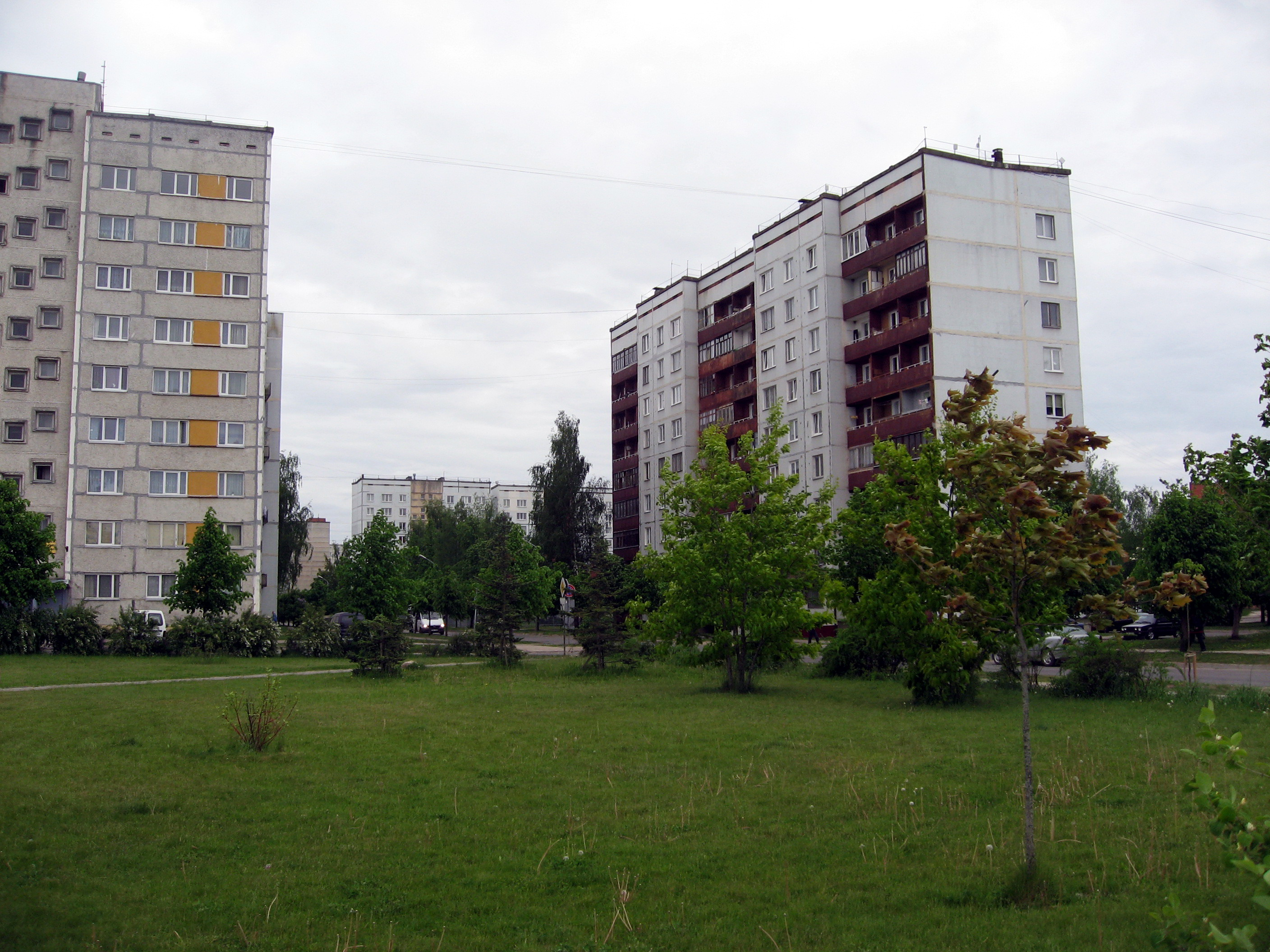
Soviet era apartment blocks in Salaspils

== Demographics ==
Due to the industrial development of Salaspils, the population has reached 21,000. At the 2000 census, 42% of population was Latvian, 42% was Russian and 16% belonged to other ethnic groups.

== Geography ==
=== The National Botanical Gardens ===
The National Botanic Garden of Latvia occupy circa 130 ha in the northern part of Salaspils. The National Botanical Garden is famous for having the richest plant collection in the Baltic States. The gardens are open to visitors, and used for recreation by the inhabitants of Salaspils.

=== Nuclear reactor ===
The reactor site is located in the forest, to the west of the Institute of Physics, in the northeastern part of the town. The reactor was operational from 1961 to 1998. The plant partook in neutron activation analysis and gamma irradiation for various materials. It was a Soviet-designed IRT swimming pool reactor with a thermal power of 5 MW. Following the reactor’s shutdown, the spent nuclear fuel was returned to its country of origin in May 2008.

== Twin towns – sister cities ==
Salaspils is twinned with:

- Finspång, Sweden
- Finsterwalde, Germany
- Wieliszew, Poland

== Gallery ==
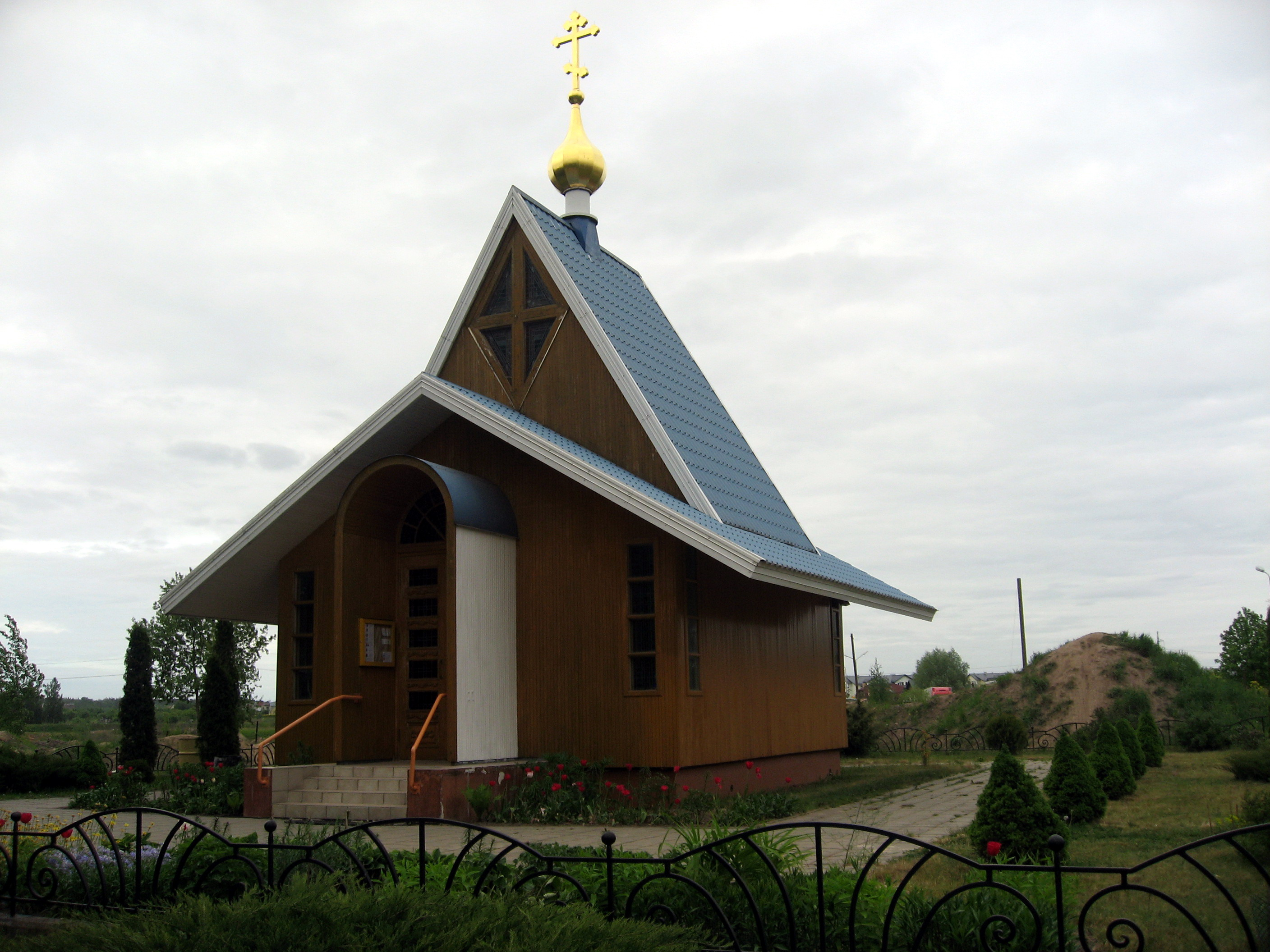
Russian Orthodox chapel in Salaspils

== See also ==
- Battle of Kircholm
