= Salaspils Municipality =

Municipality of Latvia

Coordinates: 56°51′6″N 24°21′2″E

Salaspils Municipality Salaspils novads
- Municipality
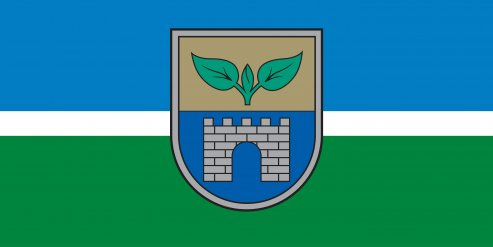
- Flag Coat of arms

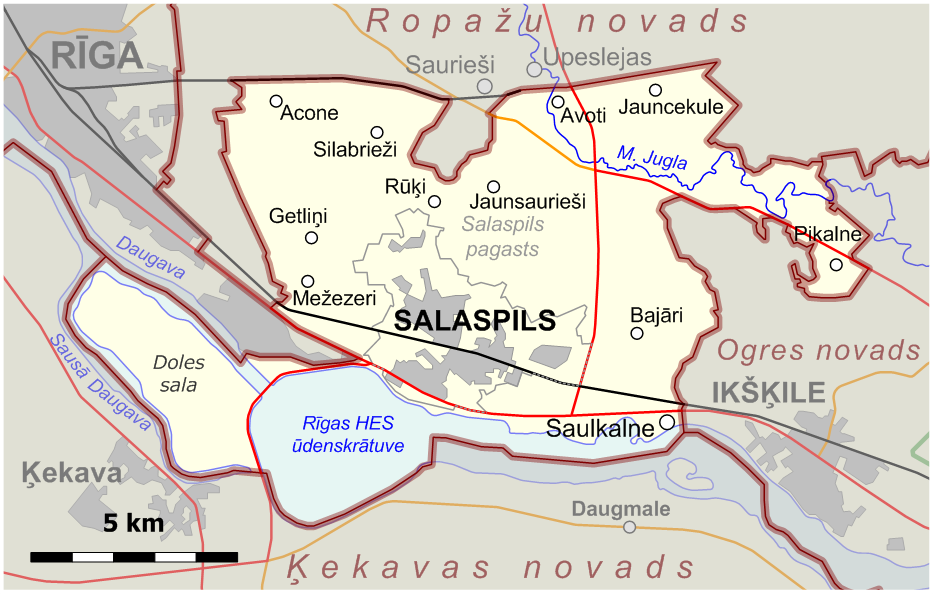
- Country: Latvia
- Formed: 2004
- Centre: Salaspils

Government
  - Council Chair: Raivis Anspaks (JV)

Area
  - Total: 122.81 km^{2} (47.42 sq mi)
  - Land: 98.74 km^{2} (38.12 sq mi)
  - Water: 24.07 km^{2} (9.29 sq mi)

Population (2026)
  - Total: 23,915
  - Density: 242.2/km^{2} (627.3/sq mi)
- Website: www.salaspils.lv

Salaspils Municipality (Latvian: Salaspils novads) is a municipality in Vidzeme, Latvia. The municipality was formed in 2004 by reorganization of Salaspils town and its rural territory, the administrative centre being Salaspils. In 2010 the rural territory was renamed Salaspils parish. The population in 2020 was 22,758.

== Politics ==
The Salaspils municipal council consists of 15 seats. Below is the composition of the council:

Municipal council seats
Party	2021
New Unity	8
National Alliance	3
Latvian Green Party	3
Social Democratic Party "Harmony"	1
Total	15

== Patron of the University of Latvia ==
Salaspils municipality is a silver patron of the University of Latvia Foundation. Has been supporting the University of Latvia since 2013, when a scholarship was established to support young people in their region who start basic studies in one of Latvia's higher education institutions, fulfilling the criteria, support is provided throughout the basic studies.

Salaspils is twinned with:

- Finspång, Sweden
- Finsterwalde, Germany
- Wieliszew, Poland

== See also ==
- Administrative divisions of Latvia
