= Cossack Hetmanate =

1649–1764 Cossack state in Ukraine

Zaporozhian Host Військо Запорозьке (Ukrainian)
- 1648–1764
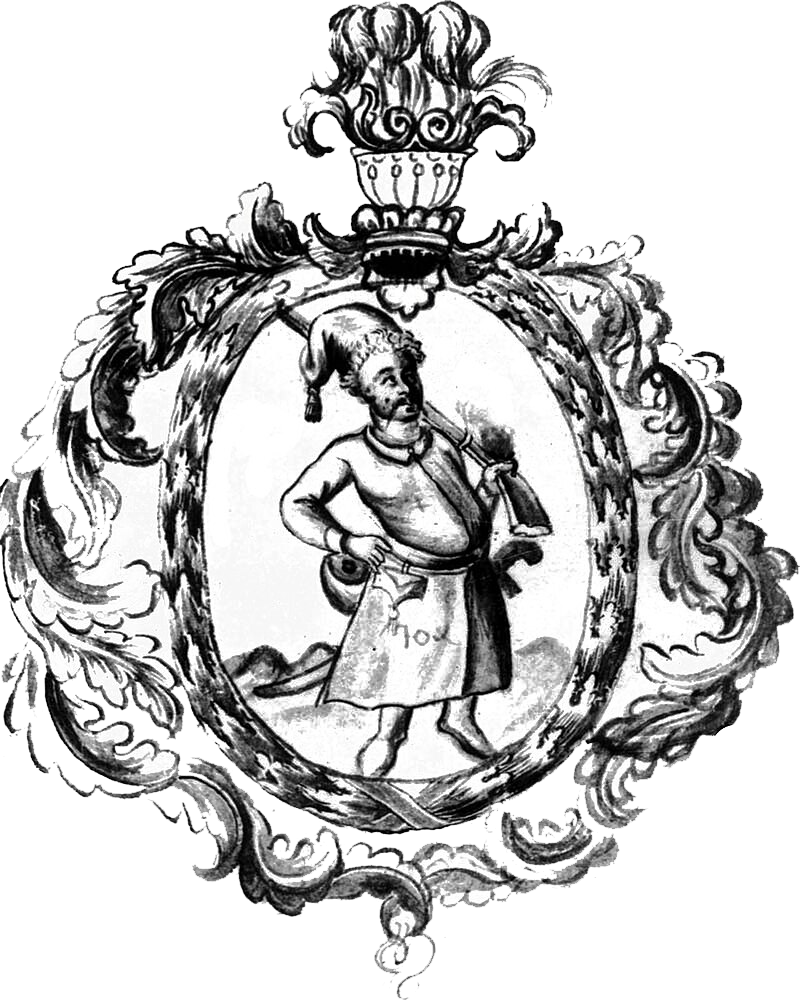
- Banner of arms Coat of arms

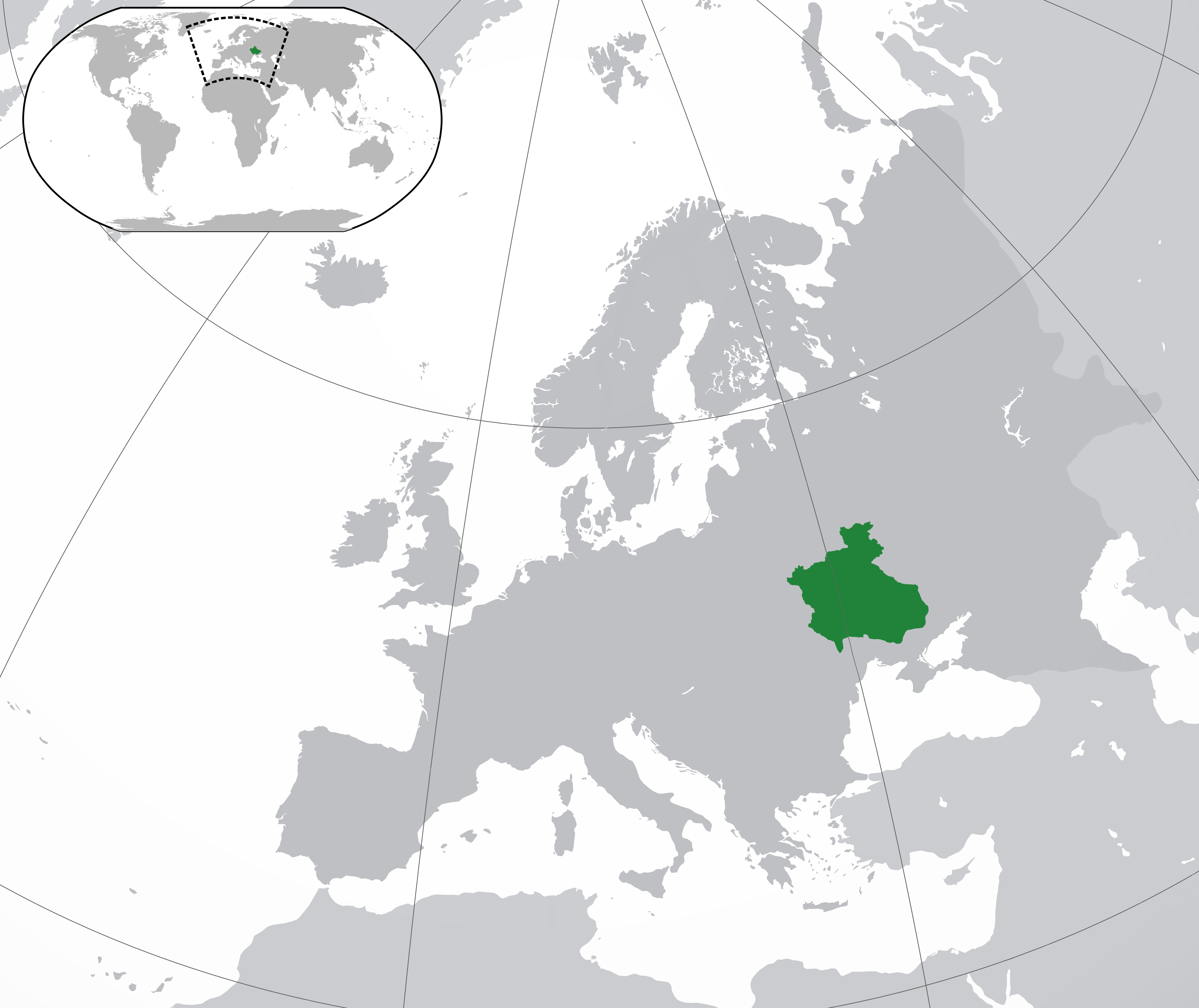
- The Cossack Hetmanate in 1654
- Status: 1648–1654, 1656–1659, 1668–1669: de facto independent; 1649–1654: de jure autonomous part of the Polish–Lithuanian Commonwealth; 1669–1685 (in the Right Bank): protectorate of the Ottoman Empire; After 1654: Protectorate of the Tsardom of Moscow and Russian Empire, concurrent with the Kiev Governorate (1708–1764)
- Capital: Chyhyryn^{a} (1649–1676); Baturyn^{b} (1663–1708); Hlukhiv^{c} (1708–1764)
- Common languages: Ruthenian (Old Ukrainian); Polish (in official use); Latin
- Religion: Eastern Orthodox
- Government: Elective monarchy General Military Chancellery
- Hetman
  - 1648–1657 (first): Bohdan Khmelnytsky
  - 1750–1764 (last): Kirill Razumovsky
- Legislature: General Cossack Council; Council of Officers
- History
  - Treaty of Zboriv: 18 (8) August 1649 1648
  - Treaty of Bila Tserkva: 1651
  - Treaty of Pereiaslav: 1654
  - Treaty of Andrusovo: 1667
  - Hetman post abolished in Poland: 1686
  - Kolomak Articles: 1687
  - Hetman post abolished in Russia: 21 (10) November 1764

Area
- 1649-1667: 312,000 km^{2} (120,000 sq mi)
- 1686-1764: 208,000 km^{2} (80,000 sq mi)

Population
  - 1649-1667: over 3 million
  - 1764: 1,017,000 (estimated by Zenon Kohut)
Preceded by	Succeeded by
Zaporozhian Sich; Kiev Voivodeship	Zaporozhian Sich; Little Russia Governorate (1764–1781)
- Today part of: Ukraine; Russia; Moldova; Belarus
- 1. Hetmanate capital 2. alternate Hetman residence 3. capital of Little Russia

The Cossack Hetmanate (Note: The term Hetmanate, especially in Russian sources, referred to Cossack regiments in Left-bank Ukraine that were under the authority of a pro-Russia hetman, from 1667 onward. This excludes both Zaporozhian Sich and Sloboda Ukraine.) (Ukrainian: Гетьма́нщина; see other names), officially the Zaporozhian Host (Note: Ruthenian: Войско Zапорожскоε;; Ukrainian: Військо Запорозьке, romanized: Viisko Zaporozke; Latin: Exercitus Zaporoviensis)), was a stratocratic state established by Registered Cossacks in Dnieper Ukraine. Its territory was located mostly in the region of Central Ukraine, as well as in parts of Belarus and southwestern Russia, and at different points it also incorporated the territories of Zaporozhian Sich to the south. The Hetmanate existed between 1648 and 1764, although its administrative-judicial system persisted until 1781.

The Hetmanate was legally recognized in the eastern territories of the Polish–Lithuanian Commonwealth by the Treaty of Zboriv, signed on August 18, 1649 by Bohdan Khmelnytsky (Hetman of the Zaporizhian Host) and Adam Kysil (representing Crown Forces), as a result of the Khmelnytsky Uprising. Establishment of vassal relations with the Tsardom of Moscow in the Treaty of Pereiaslav of 1654 is considered a benchmark of the Cossack Hetmanate in Soviet, Ukrainian, and Russian historiography. The second Pereiaslav Council in 1659 restricted the independence of the Hetmanate, and from the Russian side there were attempts to declare agreements reached with Yurii Khmelnytsky in 1659 as nothing more than the "former Bohdan's agreements" of 1654. The 1667 Treaty of Andrusovo, conducted without any representation from the Cossack Hetmanate, established the borders between the Polish and Russian states, dividing the Hetmanate in half along the Dnieper and putting the Zaporozhian Sich under a formal joint Russian-Polish administration.

After a failed attempt to break the union with Russia by Ivan Mazepa in 1708, the whole area was included into the Kiev Governorate, and Cossack autonomy was severely restricted. Catherine II of Russia officially abolished the position of Hetman in 1764, and from 1764 to 1781, the Cossack Hetmanate was incorporated as the Little Russia Governorate headed by Pyotr Rumyantsev, with the last remnants of the Hetmanate's administrative system abolished in 1781. Despite the state's eventual disbandment, it produced a lasting historical legacy, with descendants of the Hetmanate's ruling class pioneering the Ukrainian national revival during the 19th century.

== Name ==
The official name of the Cossack Hetmanate was the Zaporizhian Host / Army of Zaporozhia (Ukrainian: Військо Запорозьке). The historiographic term Hetmanate (Ukrainian: Гетьманщина, romanized: Hetmanshchyna) was coined in the late 19th century, deriving from the word hetman, the title of the general of the Zaporizhian Army. Despite not being centered in Zaporizhia, the host's name (lit. 'beyond the rapids') was derived from Cossacks centered on the Zaporizhian Sich, as well as a general name for Ukrainian Cossacks as a political and military organization.

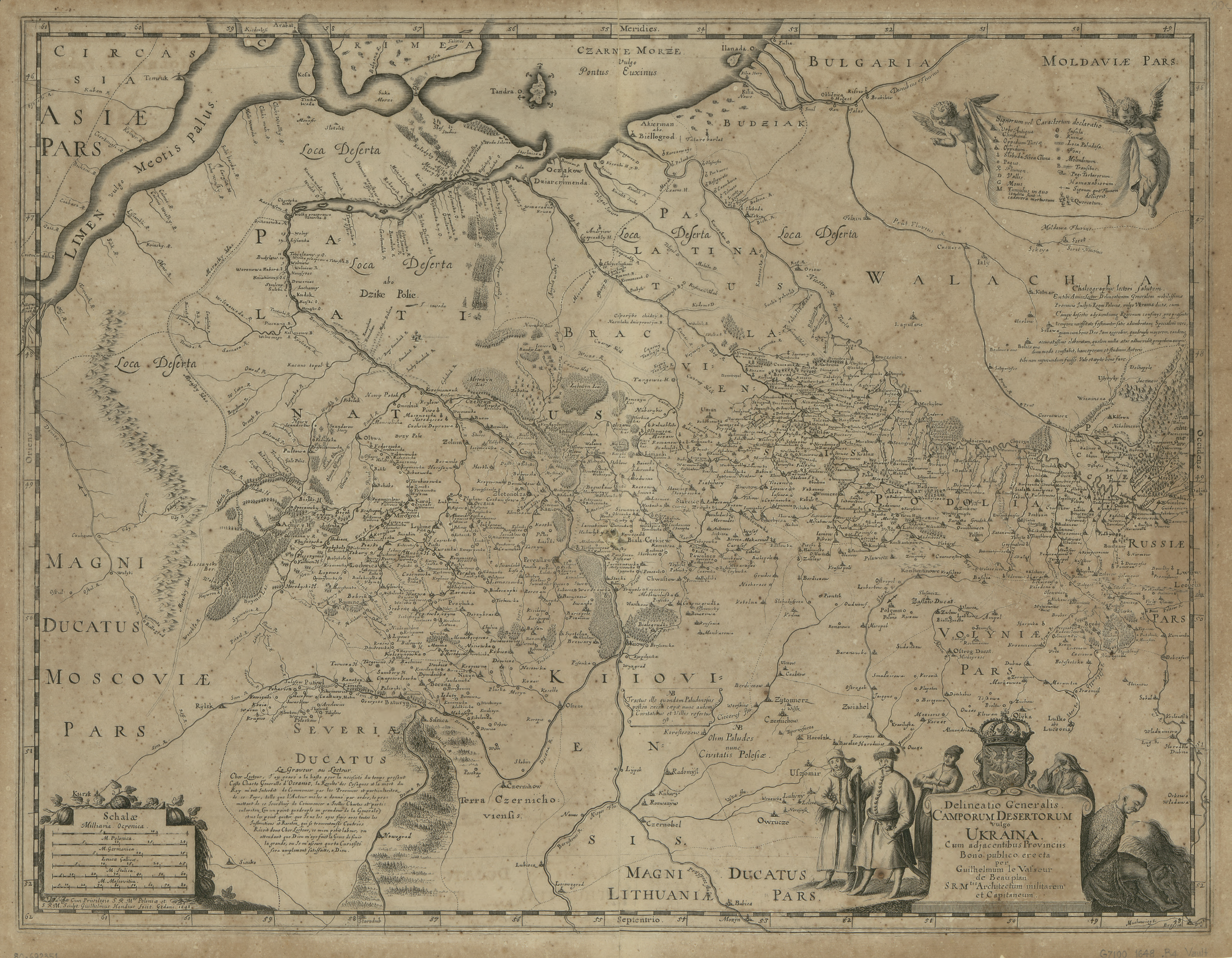
General Map of Ukraine (1648) by Beauplan. South is up.

The name "Ukraine", initially referring to the Polish palatinates of Kyiv, Bratslav and Chernihiv, was widely used in reference to the lands of the Hetmanate, although its meaning was rather poetic than formal, and denoted the generic homeland of the Cossacks. The Constitution of Pylyp Orlyk (1710) refers to the Hetmanate as "Little Russia" ("кордони Малої Росії, Вітчизни нашої", lit. 'borders of Little Russia, our Fatherland') and "Ukraine" (Ukrainian: Україна, Latin: Ucraina); the latter name is found in various Polish, Russian, Ottoman and Arab sources. Following the Khmelnytsky Uprising in 1648, the name "Little Russia" gained ground and was used in relations with Moscow, while internally, the territory was called Ukraine and its inhabitants as the "Ruthenian nation". In Russian diplomatic correspondence, it was called Little Russia (Russian: Малороссия, romanized: Malorossiya) and the Little Russia Office was created as a government department. The Cossack Hetmanate was called the "Country of Ukraine" (Turkish: اوكراینا مملكتی, romanized: Ukrayna memleketi) by the Ottoman Empire. In the text of Treaty of Buchach, it is mentioned as the Ukrainian State (Polish: Państwo Ukraińskie). The map of Ukraine made by Johann Homann, refers to it as 'Ukraine, or the Land of Cossacks" (Latin: Ukrania quae et Terra Cosaccorum). The Russian poet Alexander Pushkin also talks about "Ukraine" rather than "Cossack Hetmanate" in his poem Poltava describing events around the 1709 Battle of Poltava.

The founder of the Hetmanate, Bohdan Khmelnytsky, declared himself the ruler of the Ruthenian state to the Polish representative Adam Kysil in February 1649. His contemporary Metropolitan Sylvestr Kosiv recognized him as "the leader and the commander of our land". In his letter to Constantin Șerban (1657), he referred to himself as Clementiae divinae Generalis Dux Exercituum Zaporoviensium.

Grand Principality of Ruthenia was the proposed name of the Cossack Hetmanate as part of the Polish–Lithuanian–Ruthenian Commonwealth.

== History ==
=== Establishment ===
The Hetmanate emerged as a result of a major Cossack uprising in the Polish–Lithuanian Commonwealth, which broke out in 1648 in Ukrainian lands under the leadership of Bohdan Khmelnytsky. The causes of the uprising included corruption within the royal administrations of the Commonwealth, social disenfranchisement, intensification of the activities of the Orthodox Church, and the growth of the Cossack population despite government-imposed limitations. As a result of continuous wars with the Polish–Lithuanian Commonwealth, the Cossack Hetmanate effectively became independent but lacked international legal recognition.

==== Khmelnytsky Uprising ====
After many successful military campaigns against the Poles, Hetman Bohdan Khmelnytsky made a triumphant entry into Kyiv on Christmas 1648, where he was hailed as a liberator of the people from Polish captivity. In February 1649, during negotiations in Pereiaslav with a Polish delegation, Khmelnytsky made it clear to the Poles that he wanted to be the Hetman of a Ruthenia stretching to Chelm and Halych, and built with the Tatars' help. He warned them that he intended to resume his military campaign.

When the delegation returned and informed John II Casimir of Khmelnytsky's new campaign, the king called for an all szlachta volunteer army, and sent regular troops against the cossacks in southern Volhynia. However, after obtaining intelligence of superior cossack forces, the Polish troops retreated to Zbarazh to set up a defense. The forces of Jeremi Wiśniowiecki reinforced the Zbarazh defenders while he took the lead of all Polish forces. Khmelnytsky besieged the city, wearing it down through a series of random attacks and bombardments. The king, while rushing to help Wiśniowiecki, was ambushed with his newly gathered forces. Khmelnytsky, leaving part of his army with Ivan Cherniata near Zbarazh, moved together with İslâm III Giray to intercept the Polish reinforcements and block their way at a river crossing near Zboriv. Caught by some degree of surprise, John Casimir started negotiations with the Tatar khan. With the khan at his side, he forced Khmelnytsky to start peace negotiations.

==== Formation of the Hetmanate ====
Khmelnytsky signed the Treaty of Zboriv in August 1649, with a result somewhat less than the Cossack leader had anticipated from his campaign. According to the concluded agreement, the number of Registered Cossacks had to be increased to 40,000 and the Crown Forces were not allowed to enter the territory east of towns Hornostaipil, Korostyshiv, Pavoloch, Pohrebyshche, Vinnytsia, Bratslav, Yampil up to Muscovy border which generally related to the Kyiv Voivodeship (Palatinatus Kioviensis), Bratslav Voivodeship (Palatinatus Braclavensis), and Chernihiv Voivodeship (Ducatus Chernichov and Ducatus Novogrodeck) .

As ruler of the Hetmanate, Khmelnytsky engaged in state-building across multiple spheres: military, administration, finance, economics, and culture. He invested the Zaporozhian Host under the leadership of its hetman with supreme power in the new Ruthenian state, and unified all the spheres of Ukrainian society under his authority. This involved building a government system and a developed military and civilian administration out of Cossack officers and Ruthenian nobles, as well as the establishment of an elite within the Cossack Hetman state.

The Hetmanate used Polish currency, and Polish was frequently used as the language of administration and even of command. However, after the Truce of Andrusovo in 1667, the "simple language" (Ukrainian: проста мова), or the commonly spoken vernacular language of Ukraine, began to be written down and widely used in official documents of the Cossack Hetmanate.

=== Protectorate of Moscow ===
==== Pereyaslav Agreement ====
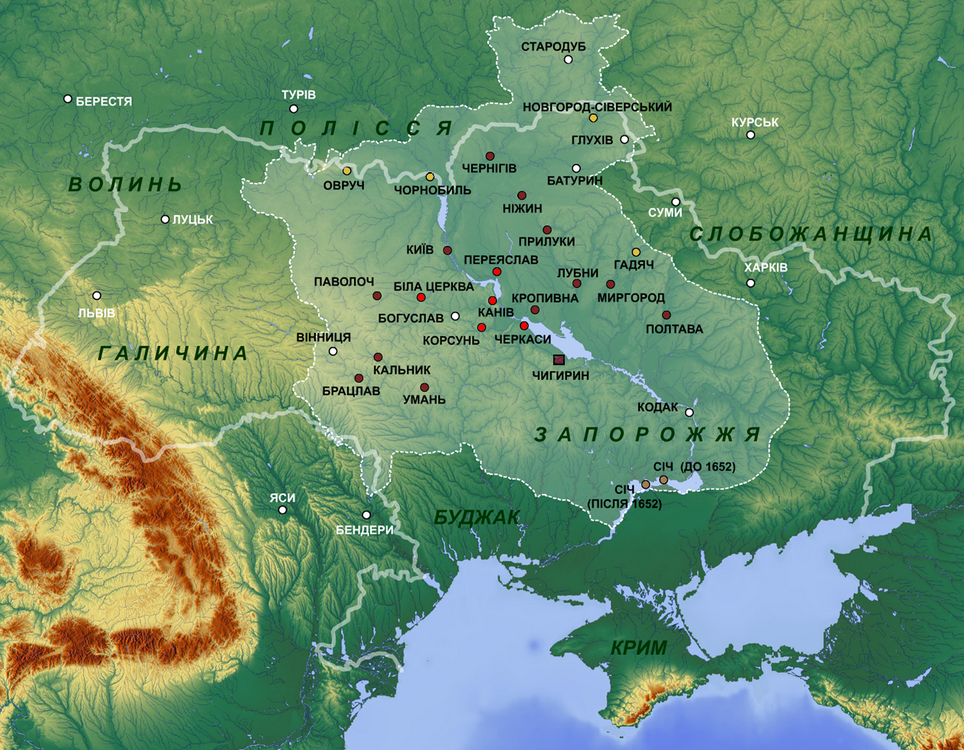
The Zaporizhian Cossack host in 1654 (against the backdrop of contemporary Ukraine)

The unreliability of the alliance with the Crimean Khanate compelled Khmelnytsky to seek foreign assistance in the struggle against Warsaw. Among the candidates willing to accept the Cossacks under their protection, the hetman considered Ottoman Sultan Mehmed and Muscovite Tsar Alexis. After prolonged negotiations, the Cossack side chose the latter.

After the Crimean Tatars betrayed the Cossacks for the third time in 1653, Khmelnytsky realized he could no longer rely on Ottoman support against Poland, and he was forced to turn to Tsardom of Russia for help. Final attempts to negotiate took place in January 1654 in the town of Pereiaslav between Khmelnytsky with Cossack leaders and the Tsar's ambassador, Vasiliy Buturlin. At the Pereiaslav Council, Khmelnytsky and the Cossack elite swore allegiance to the tsar in exchange for recognition of the Hetmanate’s self-government and the declaration of war against the Polish–Lithuanian Commonwealth.

Additional conditions of the Muscovite–Cossack alliance were set out in the March Articles, which were signed by the hetman later that same year. The treaty was concluded in April in Moscow by the Cossacks Samiilo Bohdanovych-Zarudny and Pavlo Teteria, and by Aleksey Trubetskoy, Vasilii Buturlin, and other boyars. As a result of the treaty, the Zaporozhian Host became an autonomous Hetmanate within the Russian state. The treaty also led to the Russo-Polish War of 1654–1667.

==== Continuing war and diplomacy ====
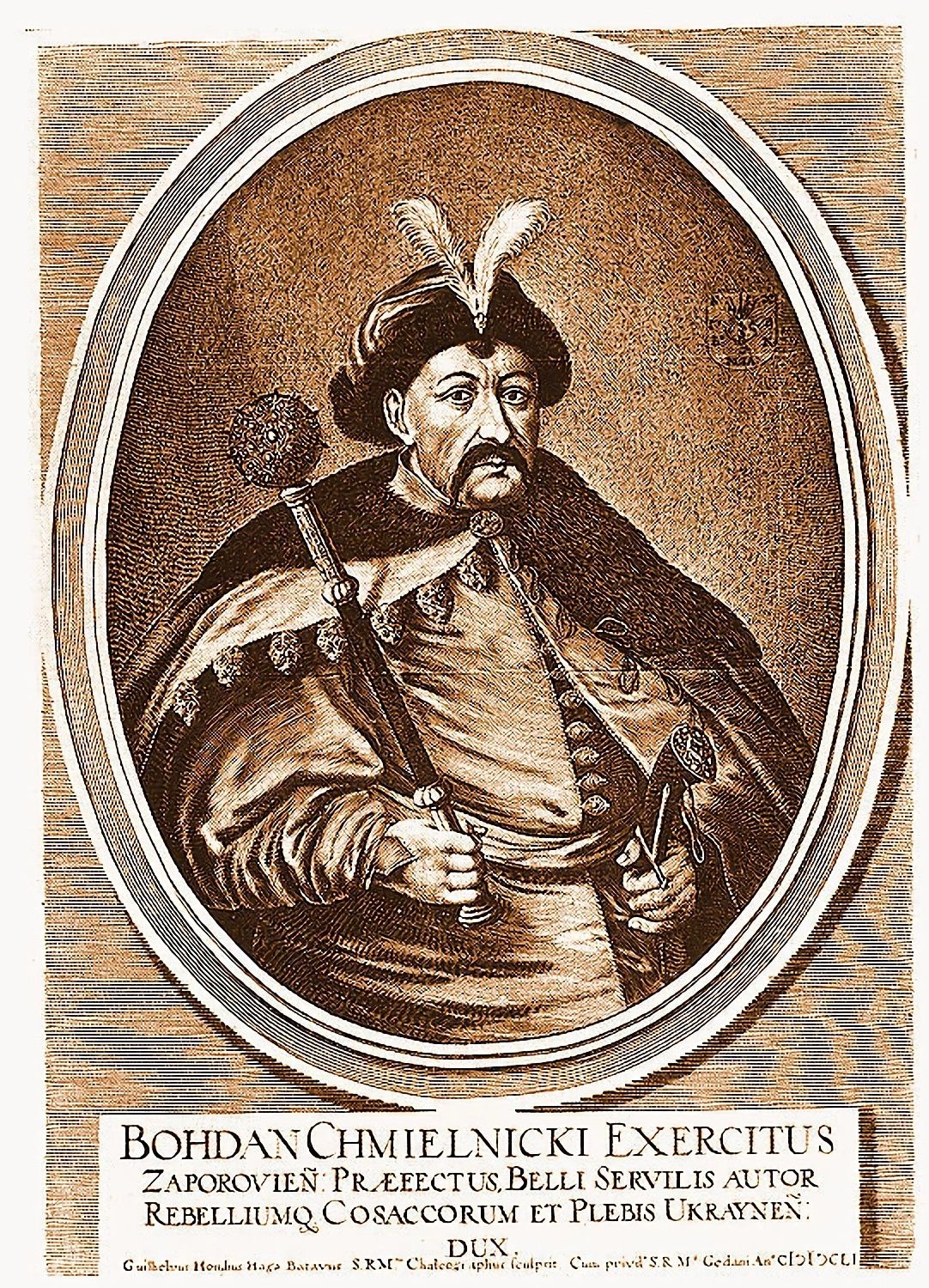
A 1651 engraving of Bohdan Khmelnytsky with hetman's regalia by Willem Hondius

In the spring of 1654, a joint Cossack–Muscovite army invaded the territory of Lithuania. The Cossacks independently captured the lands of White Ruthenia and, together with the Muscovites, seized the capital Vilnius. In response, the army of the Polish–Lithuanian Commonwealth, along with Crimean Tatars, launched a campaign against the Ukrainian Bratslav region. Khmelnytsky halted the enemy in 1655 at the Battle of Okhmativ. The military weakening of the Commonwealth was exploited by the Swedish Empire. In 1655, Swedish King Charles X launched a war against the Commonwealth in the Baltic region.

The following year, fearing the strengthening of Sweden in the region, the Muscovite Tsardom declared war on Sweden and concluded a separate Vilnius Peace with the Commonwealth. The Muscovites excluded the Cossacks from negotiations with the Poles and opposed the annexation of southern Belarus to the Hetmanate. Due to violations of the Pereiaslav agreements, Khmelnytsky concluded an alliance with the Swedish Empire and the Principality of Transylvania — enemies of Muscovy — and continued the struggle against the Commonwealth. This amounted to a de facto break with Muscovite protectorate. He also renewed diplomatic contacts with Crimea, perceiving a threat to Cossack sovereignty from the southeast.

=== The Ruin ===
The period of Hetmanate history known as "the Ruin", lasting from 1657 to 1687, was marked by constant civil wars throughout the state.

==== Rise of Ivan Vyhovsky ====
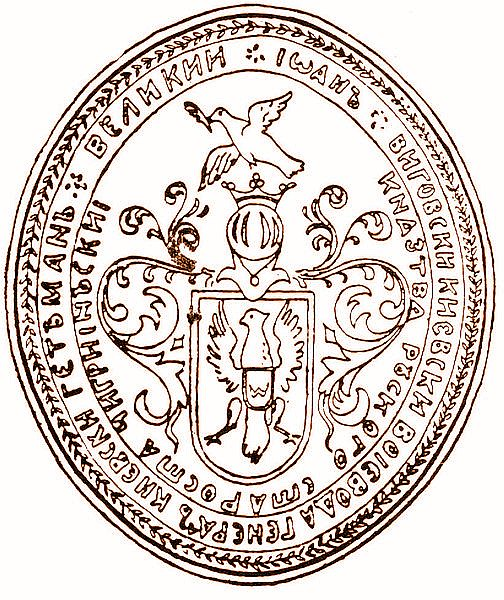
Personal seal of Ivan Vyhovsky as hetman and Prince of Ruthenia

After Bohdan Khmelnytsky died in 1657, his sixteen-year-old son Yurii Khmelnytsky was elected as successor. Bohdan's son was not only too young and inexperienced, but also clearly lacked the charisma and leadership qualities of his father. In response, Ivan Vyhovsky, the general scribe (Ukrainian: писар, romanized: pysar) of the Hetmanate and an adviser to Bohdan Khmelnytsky, was elected hetman in 1657 by the Starshyna council. His election caused widespread discontent among other regiments and the Zaporizhian Host, who sent runners to Moscow with complaints. As a result, new elections were called that same year at which Vyhovsky was reelected at the General Military Council. This election was also confirmed by Russian authorities who were informed according to the Pereiaslav treaty. Moscow continued to accept runners from the regions of Cossack Hetmanate completely disregarding the authority of hetman and spreading rumors that in truth Russia did not support the candidacy of Vyhovsky.

Vyhovsky's election was opposed by the Zaporozhian Cossacks, who had not been invited to the council, and by Poltava colonel Martyn Pushkar, who led opposition forces that rejected the restoration of the noble-dominated social order. Together with the Zaporozhian ataman Yakiv Barabash, Pushkar raised a rebellion in Left-Bank Ukraine and appealed for support to the only possible ally — Muscovite Tsardom. Initially, the tsar attempted to reconcile the sides, later sending troops intended to support either the hetman, if he dismissed the Tatars, or the rebels if he failed to do so. Vyhovsky, seeing the situation turning out of his control, went on to extinguish the revolt. In the spring of 1658 Vyhovsky crossed Dnieper and confronted mutineers near Poltava with the help of Tatars. During the battle Pushkar was killed and replaced with a new colonel, while the leaders of the uprising were strictly repressed.

==== Attempts at reconciliation with the Commonwealth ====
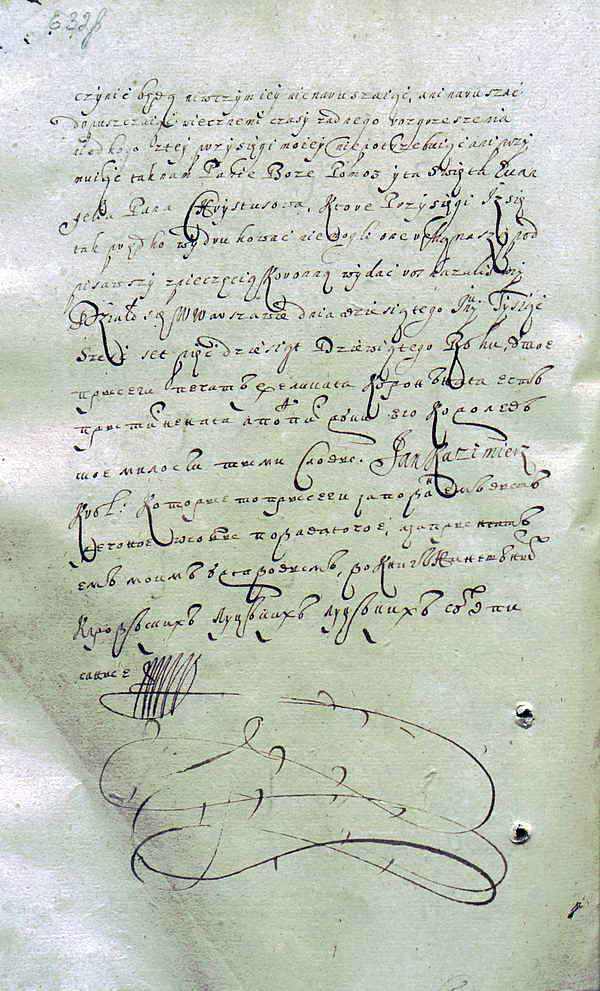
Oath of the Polish king Jan II Kazimierz on the Treaty of Hadiach

Within a year, the hetman managed to suppress the opposition militarily. Subsequently, due to Vyhovsky’s openly pro-Polish policy and continued overt support of anti-hetman forces by the Muscovite government, he pursued a course toward withdrawal from Muscovite protection. The newly elected Metropolitan Dionisi Balaban was transferred to Chyhyryn, away from Kyiv. A manifest nullifying the union with Russia was sent throughout Europe, mainly because it was conducting friendly relationships with Poland and supporting internal opposition within the Hetmanate. Negotiations with Sweden had frozen, while he had military support from the Crimean Khanate, so Vyhovsky decided to renegotiate with Poland, with whom talks continued for quite some time.

On September 16, 1658 in Hadiach, a Cossack council together with emissaries of the Polish–Lithuanian Commonwealth approved an agreement proposed by the hetman to return Ukraine under the authority of the Polish king. The Treaty of Hadiach was signed based on the idea of transforming the Commonwealth into a union of Poland, Lithuania, and Cossack Rus'. Under the conditions of the treaty, Ukraine would become a third and autonomous component of the Polish–Lithuanian Commonwealth, under the ultimate sovereignty of the King of Poland but with its own military, courts, and treasury. The Diet ratified a reduced version of the treaty in May 1659, but the government of Yurii Khmelnytsky annulled it in October 1659 after signing an agreement with Muscovy.

==== Vyhovsky's downfall ====
In response to the Treaty of Hadiach, the Muscovite Tsardom sent troops into Ukraine, which were defeated by Vyhovsky and his allies in 1659 at Konotop. Despite the victory, the hetman could not capitalize on it — the Warsaw Sejm curtailed the negotiated text of the Hadiach Agreement. This provoked outrage among the entire Cossack community and contributed to the revival of pro-Muscovite influences on the Left Bank. At the same time, Zaporozhian Cossacks led by Ivan Sirko independently launched a raid against Crimea, an ally of Vyhovsky. In September 1659, the hetman was deposed at a Black Council near Hermanivka for having "sold Ukraine to the Poles". Vyhovsky escaped, and in Bila Tserkva the Cossacks elected the 18-year-old Yurii Khmelnytsky, son of the late Bohdan, as the new hetman, who signed the newly composed Pereiaslav Articles that were increasingly unfavorable for the Hetmanate and later led to introduction of serfdom rights.

==== Partition of Ukraine ====
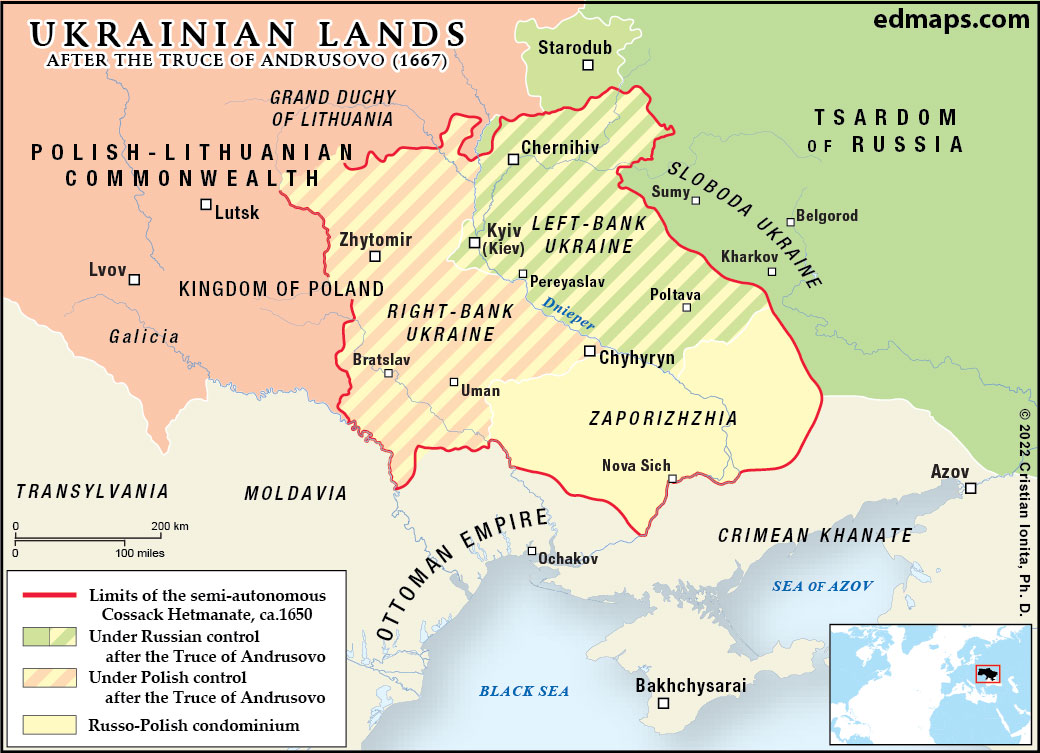
Partition of the Cossack Hetmanate after the Truce of Andrusovo (1667)

After the flight of Teteria, Petro Doroshenko was elected the new hetman of Right-Bank Ukraine. He suppressed pro-Muscovite opposition in his territory, resumed negotiations with the Ottoman Empire regarding protection, and, with the support of the Crimean Tatars, launched a war against the Polish–Lithuanian Commonwealth, hoping to "drive all Poles out of Ukraine into Poland". These actions pushed the Commonwealth and the Muscovite Tsardom toward peace. In 1667, the Russo-Polish war ended with the Treaty of Andrusovo, which split the Cossack Hetmanate along the Dnieper River: Left-bank Ukraine enjoyed a degree of autonomy within the Tsardom of Russia, while Right-bank Ukraine remained part of the Polish–Lithuanian Commonwealth, and was temporarily occupied by the Ottoman Empire in the period of 1672–1699 (see the Treaty of Buchach and the Treaty of Karlowitz). The agreement nullified the Cossacks' struggle for their own state and provoked widespread outrage on both sides of the river.

In 1668, councils of Cossack elders convened in Right-Bank Chyhyryn and Left-Bank Hadiach adopted identical resolutions—to accept the protection of the Ottoman sultan. An anti-Muscovite uprising erupted on the Left Bank. Near Dykanka, the hetmans Doroshenko and Briukhovetsky met; however, rank-and-file Cossacks tore the latter apart as a traitor to Moscow. Doroshenko was proclaimed hetman of both banks of the Dnieper. For a short time, Petro Doroshenko became the hetman of both banks. He defeated the Muscovite army and returned to Chyhyryn, leaving the defense of the Left Bank to the Chernihiv colonel Demian Mnohohrishny. However, already in 1669, in Doroshenko's absence, part of the Left-Bank elite, persuaded by Orthodox Archbishop Lazar Baranovych, proclaimed Mnohohrishny hetman and approved the signing of the Hlukhiv Articles — a new agreement establishing Muscovite protection over the Cossacks. Due to Mnohohrishny's sympathy for Doroshenko, he quickly lost the hetman’s mace. In 1672, Muscovite troops surrounded Baturyn, arrested the hetman, and after torturing him in Moscow, exiled him to Siberia. At a new Cossack council held on Muscovite territory near Putyvl, surrounded by Muscovite troops, a new hetman was elected—General Chancellor Ivan Samoilovych, one of those who had denounced Mnohohrishny. He signed new Konotop Articles, which deprived the Hetmanate of the right to conduct independent foreign policy and stripped ordinary Cossacks of the right to elect the hetman.

==== Doroshenko's alliance with Ottomans ====
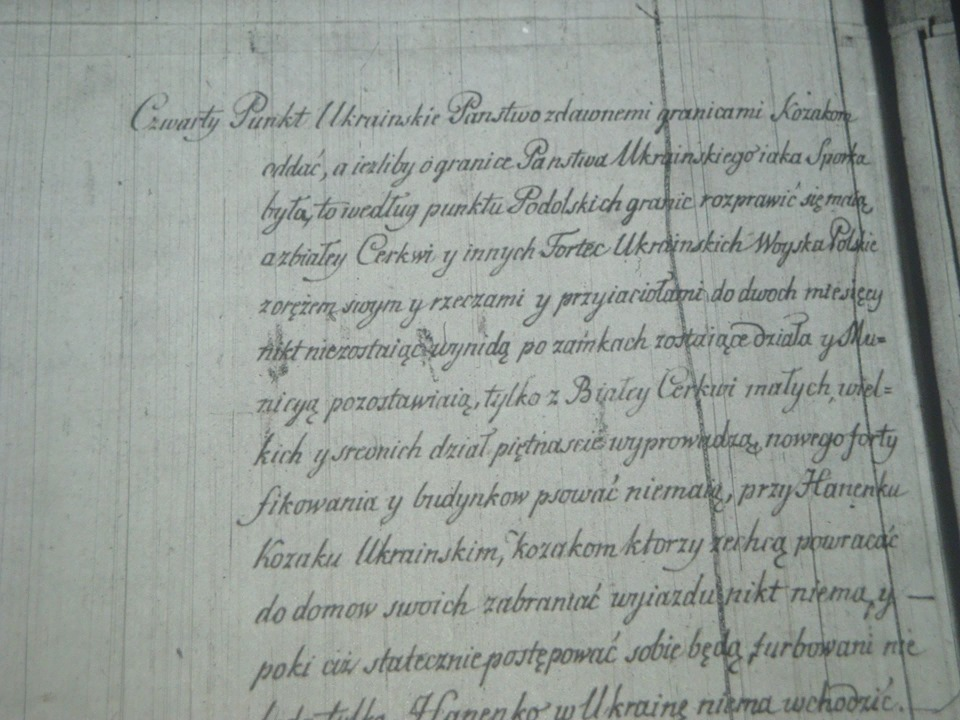
Mention of the "Ukrainian State" (Polish: Ukrainskie Panstwo in one of the points of the 1672 Treaty of Buchach

Against the backdrop of the gradual absorption of the Left Bank by Muscovy and internal anarchy, in 1669 the Right-Bank hetman Petro Doroshenko accepted the protection of the Ottoman sultan near Korsun. After treason by Demian Mnohohrishny and a new Polish offensive, Doroshenko concluded an alliance with the Ottomans, who granted him Ukraine, while the hetman agreed to support Ottoman military action with his army. "By 1669 the Porte issued a patent (berat, nişan) granting Doroshenko all of Cossack Ukraine as an Ottoman sancak or province". This move sharply reduced his popularity among the Ukrainians and commoners, giving rise to the emergence of two self-proclaimed right-bank hetmans, Petro Sukhovii and the pro-Polish Mykhailo Khanenko. Direct armed support of the anti-Doroshenko forces by the Polish-Lithuanian Commonwealth forced Sultan Mehmed IV to intervene in the conflict. In 1672, Ottoman troops captured Podillia, the Bratslav region, and the southern Kyiv region and forced the Poles to sign the Treaty of Buchach. Doroshenko restored his power, but due to Tatar raids and violent islamization, the Ukrainian population of the right bank began to flee to the left bank of the Dnieper, Sloboda Ukraine, Galicia and Volhynia.

==== Samoilovych's campaigns ====
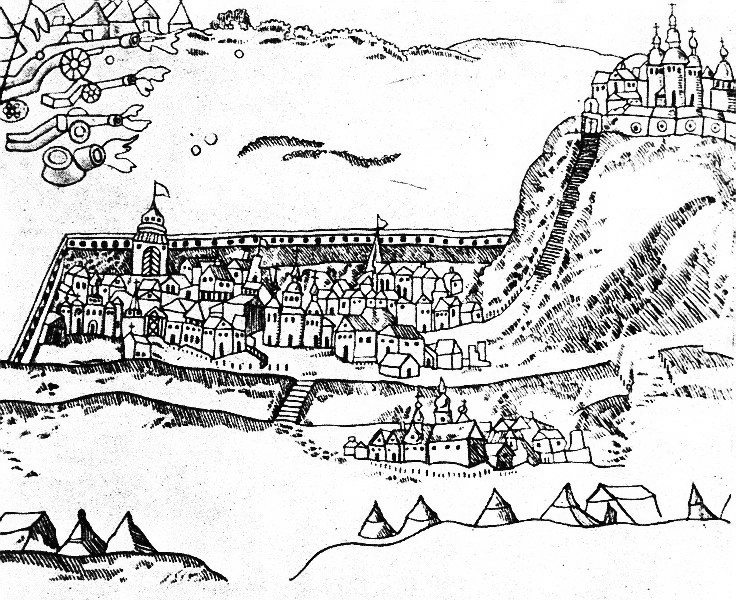
Ottoman siege of Chyhyryn in 1678

In 1674, Samoilovych's left-bank Cossacks, together with the Russian army, invaded the right bank, and in 1676, deprived of support, Doroshenko capitulated, surrendering the hetman's capital of Chyhyryn with kleinods. These events unleashed the Russo-Turkish War, as a result of which the Ottoman-Tatar army completely destroyed the Cossack capital Chyhyryn. In order to deprive the enemy of support, the Left-bank hetman's government forcibly removed the entire population of the Dnieper region to the Left bank. The war ended with the conclusion of the Bakhchysarai Peace in 1681. According to this treaty, the Russo-Ottoman border was established along the Dnieper; the territory between the Dnieper and Buh rivers had to be uninhabited for 20 years. After the defeat of the Ottomans at the Battle of Vienna in 1683, the Tsardom of Russia and the Polish-Lithuanian Commonwealth concluded the Treaty of Perpetual Peace in 1686, which also established the division of the Hetmanate between them. On the left bank, Samoilovych was considered to be the culprit of the disintegration of the Cossack state between the Tsardom of Russia, the Polish–Lithuanian Commonwealth and the Ottoman Empire. After the unsuccessful Crimean campaign of 1687, he was denounced, arrested, and exiled to Siberia. At the same time, on the right bank, the Poles abolished the Cossack self-government and the regimental system in 1699. As a result, the Hetmanate continued to exist only on the left bank of the Dnieper.

=== Hetmanate under Ivan Mazepa ===
==== Social and political changes ====
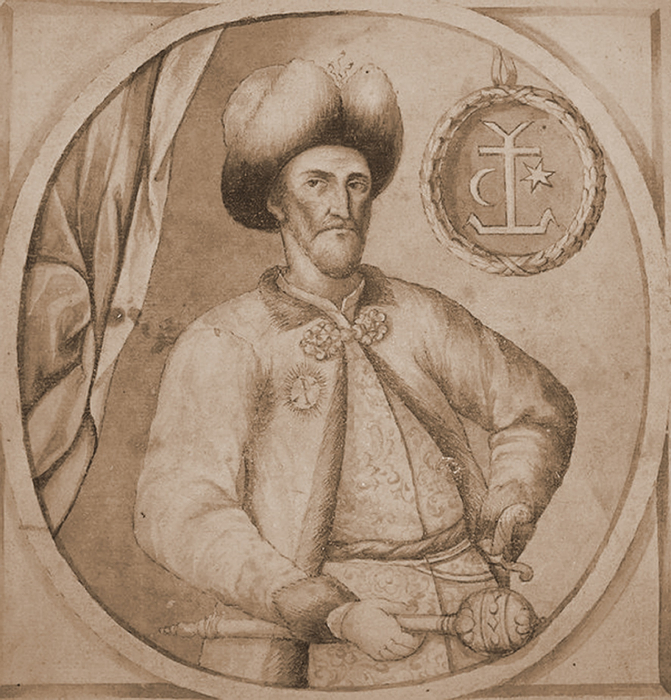
Portrait of Ivan Mazepa from the Samiilo Velychko Chronicle

The period of the Ruin effectively ended when Ivan Mazepa was elected hetman, serving from 1687 to 1708. He brought stability to the Left-bank Ukraine, which was again united under a single hetman. The Hetmanate flourished under his rule, particularly in literature and architecture. The architectural style that developed during his reign was called the Cossack Baroque style. Mazepa worked to elevate the Cossack starshyna to the status of a new nobility, including not only high-ranked officials, but also members of their families into the new elite and turning them into a privileged group separate from rank and file Cossacks. This new aristocracy preferred to style itself as szlachta, underlining its direct descent from the political nation of the Polish-Lithuanian Commonwealth and adopting its own coats of arms. Lower classes, most prominently peasants, were subjected to the military administration and required to pay taxes. Social mobility between classes was a usual occurrence, with richer peasants able to provide themselves with weapons entering the Cossack army, and poorer Cossacks working on land turining into peasants. Big landowners practiced the creation of slobodas, where new settlers coming to their land were allowed to live on beneficial terms; with time those settlers would be turned into their landlord's subjects. The rise of the new Cossack elite caused social frictions, illustrated by the 1692 revolt led by Petro Ivanenko (Petryk).

==== Alliance with Charles XII of Sweden ====
Ruins of a church destroyed by Menshikov's troops on the order of Peter I in Baturyn

Mazepa's military policies contributed to the popular dissatisfaction, as the hetman was required to provide Cossack troops for numerous wars led by the Russian government. The Great Northern War, which broke out between Russia and Sweden in 1700, greatly damaged the Ukrainian economy by disrupting the trade with Poland. Mazepa's alliance with Peter I caused heavy losses among Cossacks and increased Russian interference in the Hetmanate's internal affairs. Russian troops stationed in Ukraine engaged in mass requisition of food and cattle, which put an additional burden on the heavily taxed population, and violated local law by exploiting Cossacks in military construction, robbing houses and engaging in murder and rape. When the tsar refused to defend Ukraine against the Polish King Stanislaus Leszczynski, an ally of Charles XII of Sweden, Mazepa allied himself with the Swedes on October 28, 1708. As most Cossack regiments at that time were fighting at the front, only a small number of Cossacks joined the hetman in his alliance with Charles XII.

Having learned about Mazepa's desertion, Peter declared him a traitor and ordered his general Alexander Menshikov to burn the hetman's capital in Baturyn. Up to 15,000 people, including women and children, were killed during the sack of the city by Muscovite troops on 13 November 1708. A special commission was created in Lebedyn in order to persecute suspected followers of the renegade hetman. This resulted in the death of over 900 Cossack officials, who were accused of treason. On 17 November, after performing a mock execution of Mazepa's effigy, Peter officially appointed Starodub colonel Ivan Skoropadsky as hetman. An anathema on Mazepa's name was officially proclaimed by the Russian Orthodox Church and remained in place until 1918.

==== Battle of Poltava ====
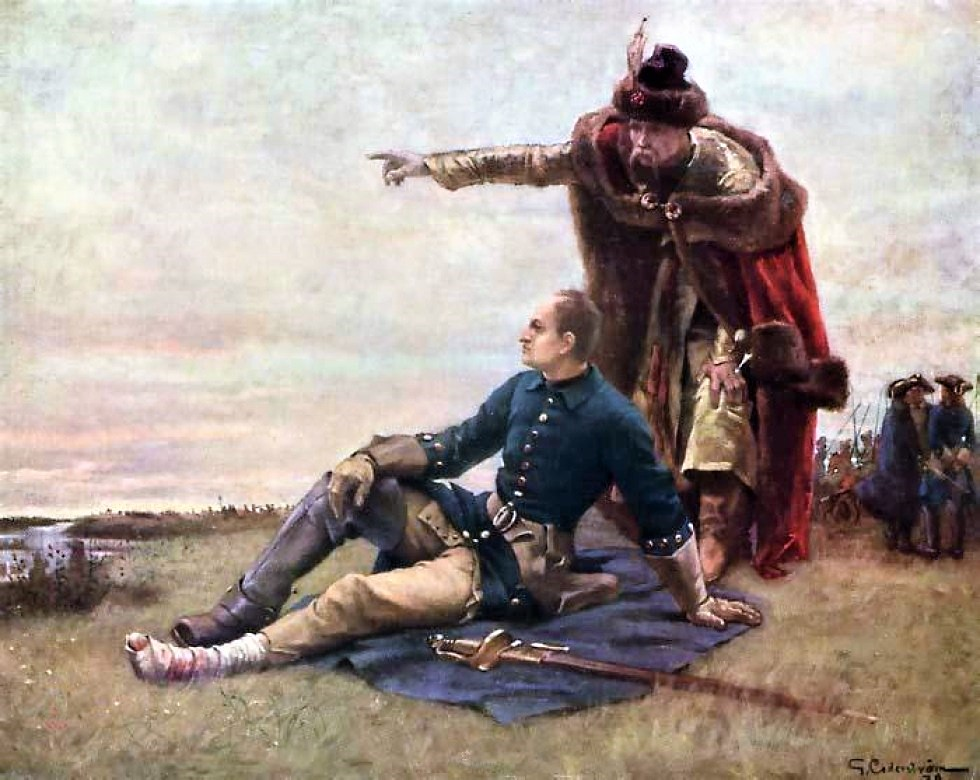
Mazepa and Charles XII after the Battle of Poltava by Gustaf Cederström

The unusually cold winter of 1708–1709 contributed to problems suffered by Mazepa and his new Swedish allies arriving to Ukraine: soldiers were suffering from the lack of residential quarters and warm clothes, and the need to requisition food and animal feed caused dissatisfaction among locals. In addition, Peter's agents spread rumours about the hetman being a secret Catholic and a Polish sympathizer. The fact that Charles XII's soldiers were Protestants also did not help to win the popular sympathy. Hostility to Mazepa's allies increased after the Swedish campaign in Sloboda Ukraine during early 1709, as a result of which numerous settlements were ruined. On the positive side, in March 1709 Zaporozhian Sich, the hetman's longtime opponent, joined Mazepa's anti-Moscow alliance, with its kish otaman Kost Hordiienko arriving to the Swedish-Cossack camp. As a reaction to this development, Peter I ordered the destruction of the Zaporozhian Sich, and in May his troops executed thousands of people residing in its territories.

The decisive Battle of Poltava, which took place on 8 July 1709 ended in the defeat of Swedish forces from a numerically superior Russian army, which also included Skoropadsky's Cossack troops. After retreating with the remnants of their forces to Perevolochna, Mazepa and Charles XII crossed the Dnieper and arrived to the Ottoman possessions. Peter I offered Turkish officials a large sum of money in exchange for delivering the hetman to him, but the sultan declared Mazepa to have legal immunity. The exhausted hetman never recovered from the defeat and died on 2 October 1709 in Bender.

=== Hetmanate after Mazepa ===
==== Pylyp Orlyk's hetmanate in exile ====
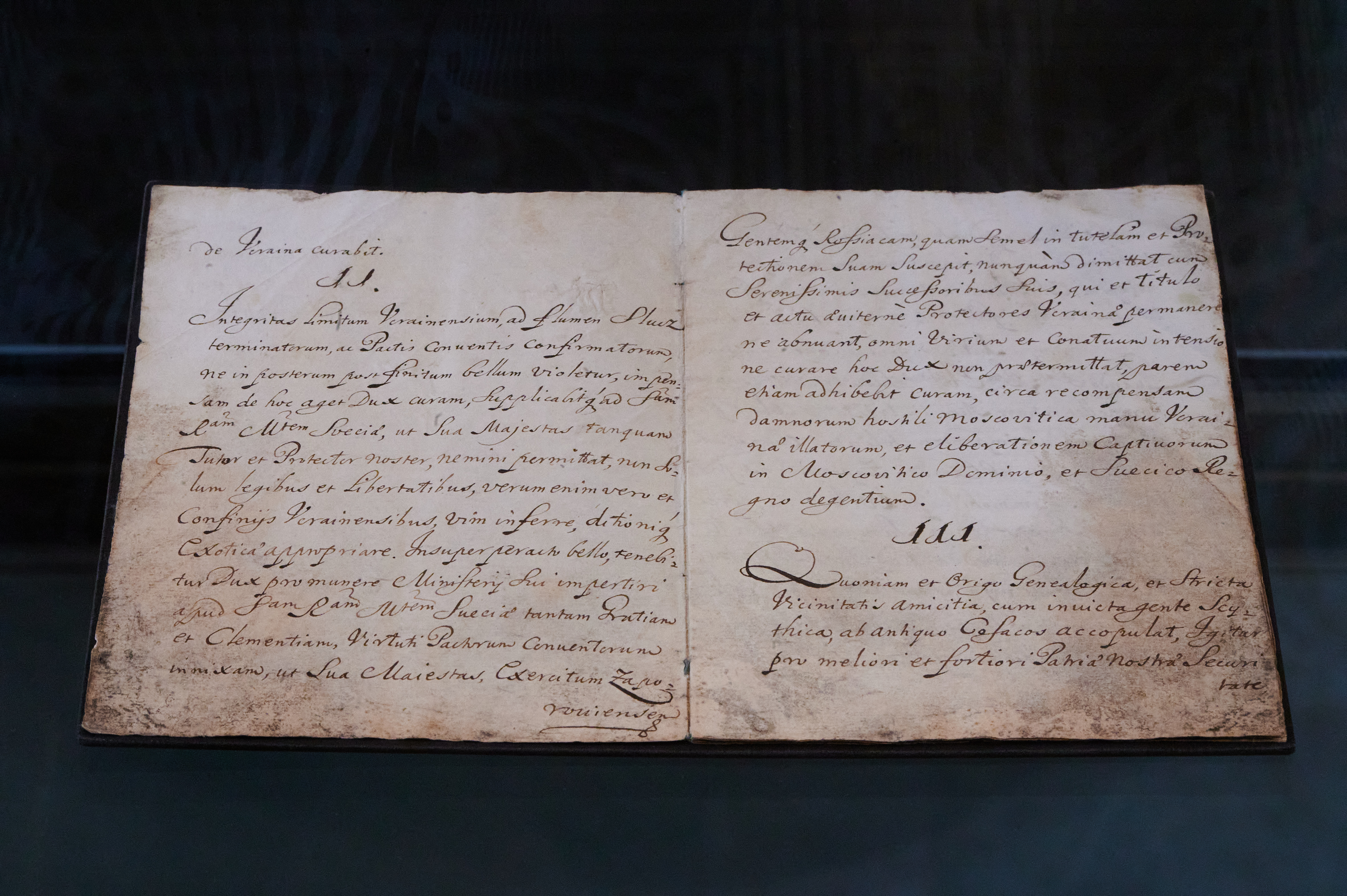
Latin version of the Constitution of Pylyp Orlyk exhibited in Kyiv

In April 1710, Mazepa's general scribe Pylyp Orlyk was elected as his successor, serving as hetman in exile. One of Orlyk's first acts after the election was the approval of the Pacts and Constitutions of the Zaporozhian Host, which introduced a democratic structure for the Cossack state. The new hetman's most important ally in realizing this program was Charles XII, who in May 1710 proclaimed himself protector of Ukraine. Following the declaration of war against Peter I by the sultan, in January 1711, a treaty of alliance between Orlyk and khan Devlet II Giray was signed in Bakhchisaray. Soon thereafter, the hetman's troops entered Right-bank Ukraine with the support of Polish forces and the Nogays, and were soon joined by many locals. However, during the Siege of Bila Tserkva Nogays fled Orlyk's ranks, raiding the surrounding country, and the hetman was forced to return to Bender. Soon thereafter, Peter I started a counteroffensive with the support of Moldovan ruler Dimitrie Cantemir, but in July the tsar's forces were encircled on the Prut River. As a result, Peter had to sign a peace agreement, according to which Russian troops were to leave Right-bank Ukraine. In March 1712, the sultan declared Orlyk to be the "Lord of Ukraine" in the lands formerly ruled by Petro Doroshenko. However, when a Cossack detachment under command of Danylo Horlenko was sent to establish the hetman's rule in the region, he met the opposition of Polish authorities. After a year of battles, on 22 April 1714, the Ottomans de-facto recognized Polish control over the Right-bank Ukraine.

Having failed to win the Ottoman support for his cause, in late 1714, Orlyk left Bender for Sweden, meanwhile his supporters moved to Left-bank Ukraine, hoping for an amnesty, and Kost Hordiienko returned to the Zaporozhian Sich. From that time on, the exiled hetman would travel between European courts, looking for support in liberating Ukraine from Russian rule. Despite Orlyk's warnings about the danger of Peter I and his state to the European order and attempts to prove Ukraine's essential role for the continent, he was unable to reach his goal, and died in 1742 in Iasi.

==== Incorporation into the Russian Empire ====
The treaties of Adrianople and Karlowitz finalized the partition of Cossack lands in Ukraine, with Russia establishing itself on the Left Bank and in Kyiv, and after 1734 also gaining protectorate over the Zaporozhian Sich. The Ottomans preserved their sphere of influence in the lowland areas between the Danube and Dnieper, meanwhile Poland preserved control over Galicia, Volhynia, Podolia, and areas surrounding Kyiv from the west. Unilke the latter areas, Left-bank Ukraine retained its political and administrative structure established during the hetmanship of Bohdan Khmelnytsky. Following the destruction of Baturyn, the Hetmanate's capital was moved to Hlukhiv. After the Battle of Poltava, the Hetmanate's autonomy became nominal and the Governorate of Kyiv was established.

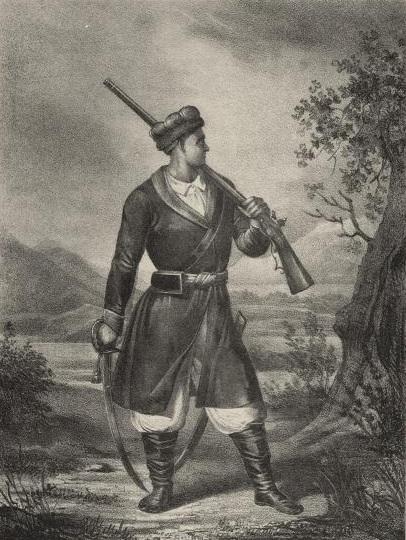
An Elected Cossack from the early 18th century

According to articles presented to Peter I in 1709 at Reshetylivka, it was proposed to include the Cossack army into the Russian military as part of a separate Ukrainian Division, however the document was never approved. The Hetmanate's military continued to be recruited from among Cossack landowners, who were freed from taxes and enjoyed a number of privileges and were subordinated to Cossack starshyna. Due to the expensiveness of weapons, gunpowder, horses and other equipment, which the recruits had to provide on their own, starting from the 1720s Cossack registers were constantly understaffed. As a result, in 1735 the host divided in two groups: Elected Cossacks, who were obliged to perform military service, and Cossack helpers, who were tasked with supplying the army. Among the latter a group of landless Cossacks who worked as hired labour started to emerge.

Starting from the early 18th century, free movement of peasants was gradually limited: in 1739 settlers were forbidden to move to the Hetmanate from Sloboda Ukraine, and in 1761 hetman Kyrylo Rozumovsky obliged those wishing to change their place of residence to receive a permit from their previous landowner. The economic state of Ukrainian lands suffered from the decision of Russian authorities to station three regiments of the imperial army in Ukraine on a constant basis, which was taken in the aftermath of the Battle of Poltava. This contributed to the introduction of special taxes to be paid by local inhabitants. Additionally, new trade regulations approved by Peter I banned the exports of numerous goods deemed "strategically important" and forcibly redirected trading routes through Northern Russia. As a result, Ukraine increasingly turned into a producer of raw materials for the developing industrial centres such as Moscow and Saint Petersburg. The foundation of state-owned factories put an additional strain on the traditional guild system.

==== First abolition of hetmanship ====
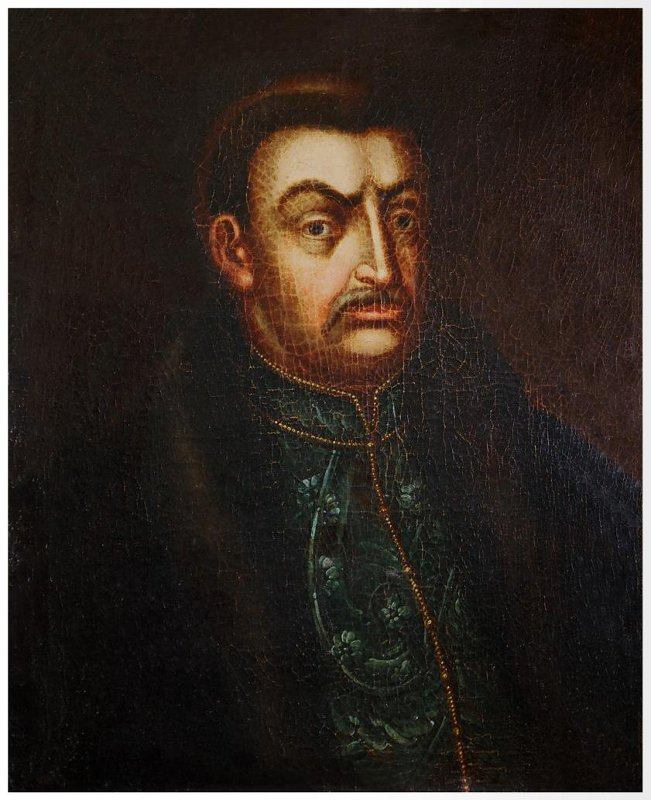
A portrait of Pavlo Polubotok

The decline of cities resulting from state policies introduced under Peter I led to conflicts between local authorities based on the Magdeburg Law and the Cossack administration. The latter also became a victim of the dismantlement of local self-government by tsarist authorities: starting from 1715, Cossack colonels could only be appointed with agreement of the monarch's representative, and starting from the 1730s direct appointment of officials became the norm. During that period the Cossack elite increasingly incorporated people of non-Ukrainian origin, such as ethnic Russians and Serbs, who were considered to be more loyal to the monarchy. In 1722 Peter I created the Collegium of Little Russia as an institutuion subjected not to his Foreign Ministry, but to the Governing Senate. This step signified that from now on the Hetmanate would be viewed by the authorities as an integral part of the wider Russian Empire. The Collegium consisted of Russian officers and was presided by Stepan Velyaminov.

Following the death of hetman Ivan Skoropadsky in 1722, Cossack starshyna appointed Pavlo Polubotok as acting hetman for the period before the new election. However, Peter I refused to approve Polubotok's candidacy, and a confict emerged between the top Cossack officials and Velyaminov, who in the absence of a hetman attempted to subject the Hetmanate to the Collegium. In 1723 Polubotok arrived to Saint Petersburg with a petition from Cossacks, asking to permit the election of a new hetman, abolish the new taxes and restore the courts' autonomy. Enraged with the appeal, the tsar ordered Polubotok and other members of his delegation to be imprisoned in the Peter and Paul Fortress, where the acting hetman died in December 1724. Following the death of Peter I in 1725 Collegium of Little Russia was officially declared to be a "protector of the common people" in Ukraine.

==== Attempts of reform ====
After the death of empress Catherine I in 1727, the Supreme Privy Council ruling from the name of underage Peter II declared the restoration of hetmanship in anticipation of a new war against Turkey. On 1 October 1727, 70-year old Myrhorod Regiment colonel Danylo Apostol was elected as the new hetman. Next year, during his visit to Moscow, he was granted new articles from the government, which slightly increased the Hetmanate's autonomy. During his tenure, Apostol performed a revision of land properties and introduced a precisely calculated budget, the expenses for which were covered from the export tax. In 1728, a commission was organized in order to harmonize the Hetmanate's law system. Its work continued until 1744, long after the hetman's death, and the codified laws continued to remain in force until into the 19th century.

The Ukrainian lands in the Russian Empire, 1740–1750, superimposed on modern Ukraine's territory. Cossack Hetmanate, centred in Hlukhiv (Глухів) Zaporizhzhian Sich, centred on Nova Sich (Нова Січ) Sloboda Ukraine, centred in Kharkiv (Харків)

After Apostol's death in 1734, power in the Hetmanate was transferred to the Governing Council of the Hetman Office, which consisted of six members: three high-ranked officers of the Russian army stationed in Ukraine and three representatives of the Cossack administration. The real power belonged to the head of the former group. During the Russo-Turkish War of 1735–1739, Russian army's supreme commander, field marshal von Münnich, received unlimited power in the Hetmanate and Sloboda Ukraine. Münnich openly disrespected the local law and autonomy, threatening Cossack officials with exile in Siberia, and petitioned for their territories to be transferred into his hereditary ownership in form of a duchy. The situation improved after the enthronement of Elizabeth Petrovna, who was secretly married to Ukrainian Cossack Oleksiy Rozumovsky. During her visit to Kyiv and Hlukhiv in 1744, Elizabeth held an audience with members of the starshyna, who petitioned her to restore their "ancient liberties", including the right to elect a hetman. Soon thereafter the Hetmanate's territory was freed from the obligation to station troops, and local inhabitants were allowed to freely trade grain. In 1745, the Metropolitanate of Kyiv was restored. In 1747, a special decree reinstated the position of hetman. In March 1750, Kyrylo Rozumovsky, the 22-year old younger brother of Oleksiy, was "elected" hetman in absentia and awarded with the traditional symbols of power by the empress. After being promoted to field marshal, in July Kyrylo arrived to Hlukhiv, where he was received with great pomp.

Despite initially being seen as a mere puppet of Saint Petersburg, the new hetman turned out to be a capable politician and administrator. Educated at the imperial court and married into the Russian higher nobility, he viewed Ukraine as an indivisible part of the Russian Empire, but supported the control of local elites over the Hetmanate, wishing to serve as a guarantor of its autonomy. A characteristic example of Rozumovsky's views was his decision to move the hetman's capital to Mazepa's Baturyn, where he ordered the construction of a classical palace surrounded by a park. Baturyn was planned by him to house a new university, that would function along with the reformed Kyiv Mohyla Academy. Rozumovsky supported the official recognition of higher-ranked Cossacks and clergy as part of the nobility with rights equal to those provided to szlachta by the Statutes of Lithuania. Between 1760 and 1763, the hetman introduced a judicial reform, which replaced regimental courts by introducing a system modelled on the court system of the Polish-Lithuanian Commonwealth. Another practice introduced by Rozumovsky was the organization of starshyna congresses in order to approve the government's decisions. One of such congresses held in Hlukhiv proposed a reform, according to which the hetman's post would be inherited by Rozumovsky's descendants, and called for a return to the system of relations between Ukraine and the tsar negotiated under Bohdan Khmelnytsky.

=== End of the Cossack Hetmanate ===
Arms of the Second Collegium of Little Russia (1764-1786)

The reform proposals issued by members of the Cossack elite in Hlukhiv caused concern in Saint Petersburg, and in January 1764, Rozumovsky was called up to he capital, never to return. The decision to remove Rozumovsky and liquidate the Hetmanate was taken by empress Catherine II under the influence of her secretary Grigory Teplov, a former mentor of the hetman, who had spent many years in Ukraine. According to Teplov, the Hetmanate's legal system, which was based on the Statute of Lithuania, was incompatible with an autocratic system due to its "republican" character. In late February Rozumovsky was forced to resign, receiving in exchange a lifelong pension and numerous landholdings in Ukraine. According to a decree issued on 21 October 1764, the hetman's post was officially liquidated, and its powers were transferred to the recreated Collegium of Little Russia headed by Governor General Pyotr Rumyantsev.

Under Rumyantsev's tenure, a new revision of the Hetmanate's landholdings was performed in 1765-1767, including a population census. The Hetmanate's elite was increasingly incorporated into the imperial nobility, and in 1775 the Zaporozhian Sich was liquidated. Finally, on 27 September 1781 regimental division of the Hetmanate was abolished. The regimental administrative system of the Little Russia Governorate was completely abolished and viceroyalties were formed. The Little Russia Governorate was then divided into three viceroyalties (provinces): Kyiv, Chernihiv and Novhorod-Siverskyi. This step meant the final and complete integration of the Ukrainian lands and society into the Russian Empire. According to this act, all institutions of law and local administration inherited from the Hetmanate were dissolved and replaced with ones formed on the example of similar institutions in other parts of the empire. In 1783 Cossack regiments were replaced with regular horse regiments staffed with former Cossacks. By 1785, when the Charter to the Gentry was issued, most members of the Cossack elite had been equalized in status with Russian nobility.

After the dissolution of the Hetmanate, in 1783, the system of serfdom would be spread to its former territories, tying the rural population to land. An aggressive policy of Russification was also started. Many Ukrainian peasants resorted to claiming Cossack origin in order to evade becoming serfs. As a result, by the late 18th century, the territories of the former Hetmanate boasted a higher-than-average noble population compared to other regions of the Russian Empire.

== Government ==
=== Leadership ===
The state supreme power belonged to the General Cossack (Military) Council, while the office of head of state was presided by the Hetman. There also was an important advising body Council of Officers (Starshyna). The hetman was initially chosen by the General Council, consisting of all Cossacks, townspeople, clergy, and even peasants. By the end of the 17th century, however, its role became more ceremonial as the hetman came to be chosen by the Council of Officers and the Hetmanate itself was turning into an authoritarian state. After the 1709 Battle of Poltava, hetman nomination was to be confirmed by the tsar. Hetman presided until he either died or was forced out by the General Cossack Council. The office of hetman had complete power over the administration, the judiciary, the finances, and the army. His cabinet functioned simultaneously as both the general staff and as the cabinet of ministers. The Hetman also had the right to conduct foreign policy, although this right was increasingly limited by Russia in the 18th century.

Each of the regimental districts making up the Hetmanate was administered by a colonel who had dual roles as supreme military and civil authority on his territory. Initially elected by that regimental district's Cossacks, by the 18th century, the colonels were appointed by the Hetman. After 1709, the colonels were frequently chosen by Moscow. Each colonel's staff consisted of a quartermaster (second-in-command), judge, chancellor, aide-de-camp, and flag-bearer.

Throughout the 18th century, local autonomy was gradually eroded within the Hetmanate. After the Baturyn's tragedy, the autonomy was abolished, incorporating it into the Kyiv Governorate. After the Battle of Poltava, hetmans elected by the Council of Officers were to be confirmed by the tsar. They served more as a military administrators and have little influence over the domestic policies. The tsar also frequently appointed the colonels of each regimental district.

=== First Little Russian Collegium ===
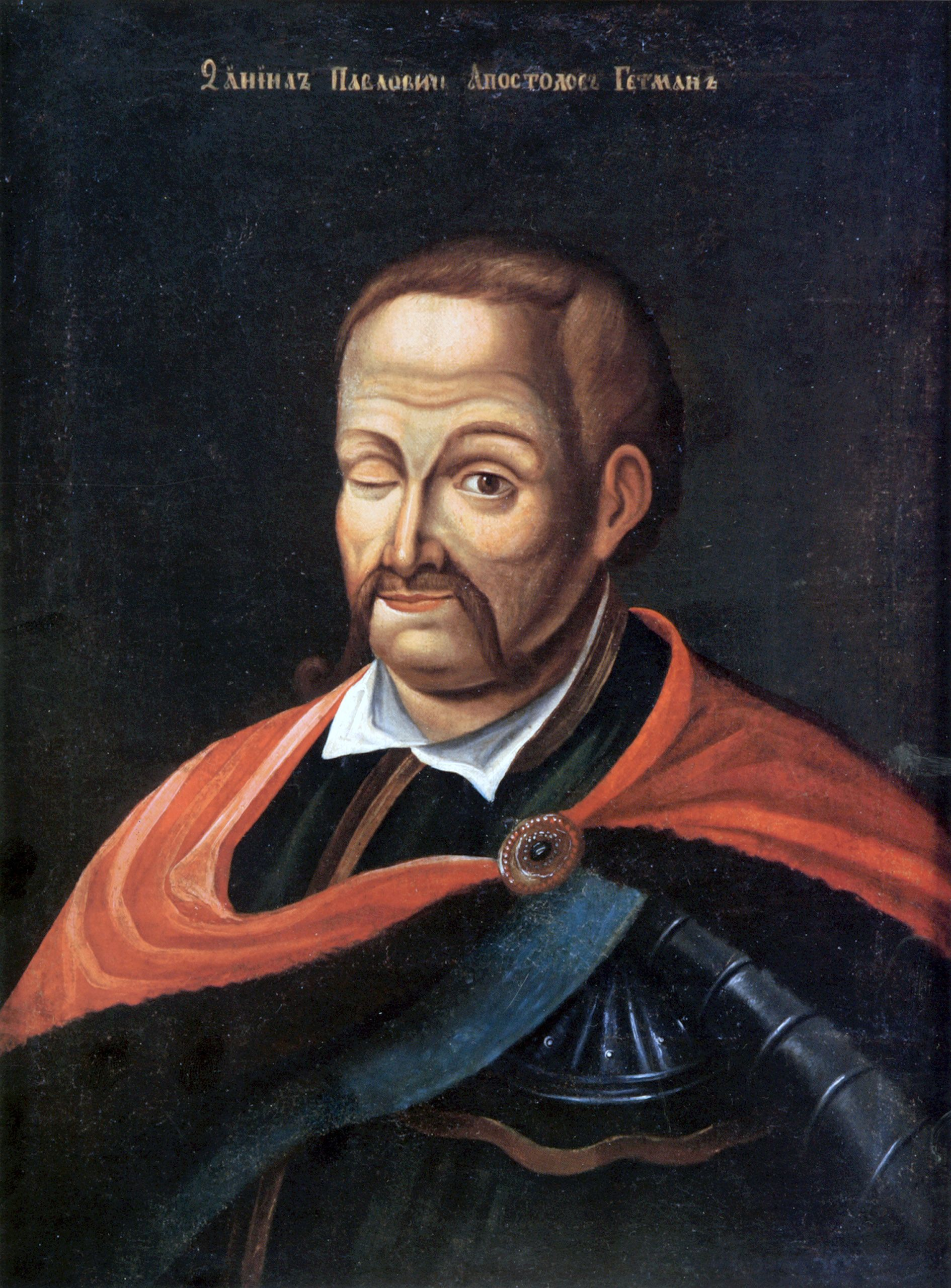
Hetman Danylo Apostol

In 1722, the governmental branch responsible for the Hetmanate was changed from the College of Foreign Affairs to the imperial Senate. That same year, the hetman's authority was undermined by the establishment of the Little Russian Collegium. It was appointed in Moscow and consisted of six Russian military officers stationed in the Hetmanate who acted as a parallel government. Its duty was ostensibly to protect the rights of rank-and-file Cossacks peasants against repression at the hands of the Cossack officers. The president of the collegiate was Brigadier Stepan Veliaminov. When the Cossacks responded by electing as Hetman Pavlo Polubotok, opposed to these reforms, he was arrested and died in prison without having been confirmed by the tsar. The Little Russian Collegium then ruled the Hetmanate until 1727, when it was abolished and a new Hetman, Danylo Apostol, was elected.

A code consisting of twenty-eight articles was adopted in 1659 that regulated the relationship between the Hetmanate and Russia. It continued to be in force until the Hetmanate's dissolution. Following the election of the new Hetman, a new set of "Pereiaslav Articles" was signed by Danylo Apostol. The new document, known as the 28 Authoritative Ordinances, stipulated that:

- The Hetmanate would not conduct its own foreign relations, although it could deal directly with Poland, the Crimean Khanate, and the Ottoman Empire about border problems as long as these agreements did not contradict Russian treaties.
- The Hetmanate continued to control ten regiments, although it was limited to three mercenary regiments.
- During war, the Cossacks were required to serve under the resident Russian commander.
- A court was established consisting of three Cossacks and three government appointees.
- Russians and other non-local landlords were allowed to remain in the Hetmanate, but no new peasants from the north could be brought in.

=== Second Little Russian Collegium ===
In 1764, the office of Hetman was abolished by Catherine II, and its authority replaced by the second Little Russian Collegium that was transformed out of the Little-Russia Prikaz (Office of Ukrainian Affairs) subordinated to the Ambassadorial Office of the Russian Tsardom. The collegiate consisted of four Russian appointees and four Cossack representatives headed by a president, Pyotr Rumyantsev, who proceeded to cautiously but firmly eliminate the vestiges of local autonomy. In 1781, the regimental system was dismantled and the Little Russian Collegium abolished. Two years later, peasants' freedom of movement was restricted and the process of enserfment was completed. Cossack soldiers were integrated into the Russian army, while the Cossack officers were granted status as Russian nobles. As had previously been the practice elsewhere in the Russian Empire, lands were confiscated from the Church (during the times of the Hetmanate monasteries alone controlled 17% of the region's lands) and distributed to the nobility. The territory of the Hetmanate was reorganized into three Russian provinces (governorates) whose administration was no different from that of any other provinces within the Russian Empire.

=== Foreign relations ===
==== Bohdan Khmelnytsky ====
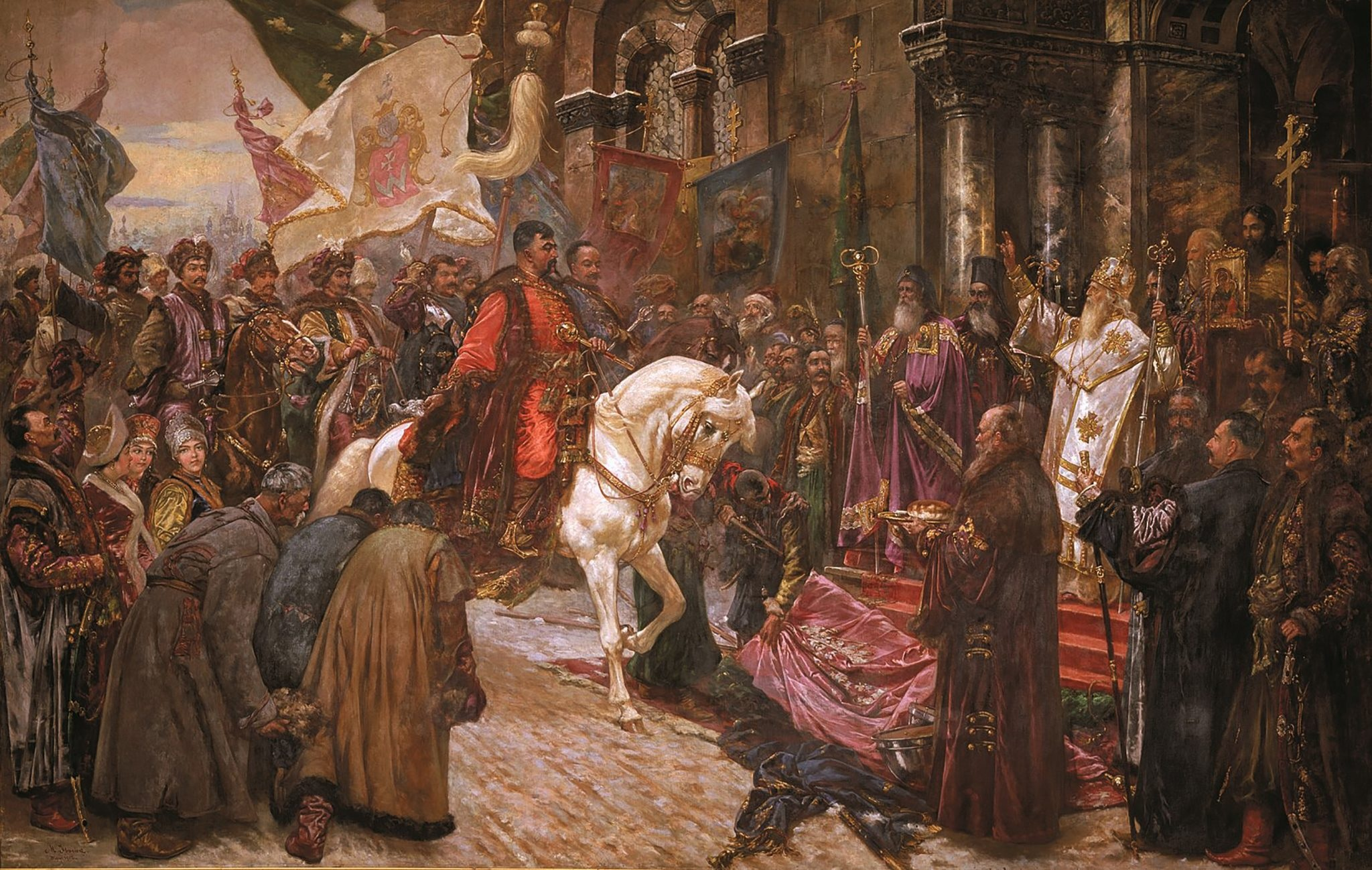
Hetman Bohdan Khmelnytsky's triumphal entry to Kyiv in 1648

Bohdan Khmelnytsky pursued a multi-vectored foreign policy for the newly created Ukrainian Cossack state. "The hetman and his colleagues began to think in terms of establishing a Cossack or Ukrainian state, either independent or allied with some other state." One system of opposition to Poland, who was waging war against the Hetmanate, was an "anti-Catholic block of Orthodox and Protestant states" that included Russia, Moldavia, Wallachia, Transylvania, and Sweden. Another option was to incorporate the Cossack Hetmanate into the Polish–Lithuanian Commonwealth as an equal partner to Grand Duchy of Lithuania and to Poland. Another system would include Ukraine into the Ottoman orbit, similar to Wallachia, Transylvania, Moldavia, and the Crimean Khanate. Finally, Khmelnytsky developed another possibility that would have involved pitting the Polish–Lithuanian Commonwealth against Russia and the Don Cossacks or, alternatively, to get Poland join Venice in their fight against the Ottomans.

In the early days of the uprising, Khmelnytsky recruited the military support of the Crimean Khanate, which was crucial in opposing the Polish forces for the Hetmanate. However, the Crimean Tatars proved to be an unreliable allies because their actions prevented Cossack victories in potentially decisive battles. It was in the interest of the khanate to keep the Cossack uprising alive so that Poland would be weakened, but a strong rival Ukrainian state was also not favorable for the khanate.

From the beginning of the uprising, Khmelnytsky also appealed to Russia, which denied giving any military aid to Khmelnytsky for almost six years. Between fall 1648 and spring 1651, Khmelnytsky frequently corresponded with Ottomans, who made vague promises of military aid to the Khmelnytsky. The hetman repeatedly asked the sultan to take him as his subject, but the Ottomans never explicitly acknowledged him as such. The sultan did say that "if the hetman remains faithful", and ahidnâme, will be granted, meaning that the sultan would guarantee peace and protection. However, by 1653, it became clear to Khmelnytsky that no ahidnâme would be granted. Khmelnytsky would show his letters from the sultan to the tsar to blackmail him into accepting the hetman into his suzerainty. The Pereiaslav Agreement, signed in March 1654, was a deal to incorporate Ukraine under Russian protection as an autonomous duchy and led to a war between Poland and Russia. Despite this treaty, Khmelnystky continued to correspond with the Ottomans in order to pit the Russians and the Ottomans against each other. He told each side that they had allied with the other only for tactical reasons.

==== Vyhovsky and Doroshenko ====
After Bohdan Khmelnytsky died in 1657, Ukraine become more instable, leading to conflicts between pro-Polish and pro-Russian factions of Cossacks. In 1658, hetman Ivan Vyhovsky negotiated the Union of Hadiach, which would set up a three-part Commonwealth, incorporating the Cossack Hetmanate as the "Grand Duchy of Ruthenia" on equal footing with the current members: the Kingdom of Poland and the Grand Duchy of Lithuania. However, the fall of Vyhovsky meant that this wouldn't come to fruition, as conflicts continued within the Cossack state. By 1660, the state was essentially divided along the Dnieper river, with a Polish-controlled west and a Russian-controlled east. In 1663, Cossacks rebelled against the Commonwealth and with the help of the Crimean Tatars in 1665, Hetman Petro Doroshenko took power, with the hopes of taking Ukraine out from under both Russia and the Polish–Lithuanian Commonwealth. The two powers had completely ignored the Hetmanate's interests and partitioned the Hetmanate along the Dnieper in the Truce of Andrusovo. In 1666, Doroshenko restarted Cossack correspondence with the Ottomans.

The Ottoman Empire perceived the Truce of Andrusovo as a threat and began to engage in a more active policy in the region. On 8 June 1668, Doroshenko became the sole hetman of all Ukraine and returned to the idea of putting Ukraine under Ottoman protection, knowing that it would be difficult to survive. Following negotiations, both parties agreed that 1,000 janissaries wouldn't be stationed in Kodak and Ukraine would not have to pay any tribute. Doroshenko also drafted 17 articles on the basis of which he would accept Ottoman protection. Doroshenko issued a letter of submission to the sultan on December 24, 1668, which was confirmed by the Sublime Porte by June 1669. When the Commonwealth attempted to unseat Doroshenko and take over the Hetmanate, the Ottomans declared war in 1672 and marched north on Kamianets-Podilskyi, with Doroshenko's Cossacks and the Crimean Tatars on their side. Following the war, the Ottomans signed a treaty with the Commonwealth, which handed the region of Podolia over to the Ottomans. Continued fighting with the Commonwealth resulted in the Ottomans ceding the province of Podolia back to the Commonwealth in the Treaty of Karlowitz. In 1674, Russia invaded the Hetmanate and besieged the capital of Chyhyryn, leading the Ottomans and Crimean Tatars to send their armies to confront the Russians. The Russians withdrew before any confrontation happened, but the Ottomans razed and plundered the settlements in the Hetmanate that had been friendly to the Russians in accordance with Darü’l-İslam. Doroshenko surrendered to the Russians 2 years later, in 1676.

Although the Ottomans, Poles, and Russians all had evidence that the Cossack Hetmanate swore allegiance to multiple parties simultaneously, "they chose to pretend they were not aware of any dual loyalty". The Ottomans did not consolidate their position in Ukraine with a strong military presence, because a frontier buffer zone suited their interests. The Ottomans referred to the Cossack Hetmanate in multiple ways. The Hetmanate under Khmelnytsky was called an eyalet; under Doroshenko, it was called a sanjak (province) by June 1669. The Ottomans called the Cossack Hetmanate "the country of Ukraine" (Turkish: اوكراینا مملكتی/Ukrayna memleketi). Historian Viktor Ostapchuk discusses the Ukrainian-Ottoman relationship in the following way:

So to what degree was Cossack Ukraine an Ottoman entity in this period? Since Islamic-style tribute (haraç) was never imposed and scarcely discussed, technically speaking, we cannot call the hetmanate an Ottoman tributary. This is, of course, why we have preferred the term "vassal," of course not in the original Western medieval sense, but in the sense of the relationship between a subject state and a suzerain, a state in which there are mutual obligations—mainly non-aggression and protection of the subject by the suzerain in exchange for, when needed, military service by the subject on behalf of the suzerain, and possibly rendering tribute.

== Administrative divisions ==
First	Regiment	Ukrainian: полк, romanized: polk, pl. Ukrainian: полки, romanized: polky
Second	Sotnia	Ukrainian: сотня, romanized: sotnia, pl. Ukrainian: сотні, romanized: sotni
Third	Kurin	Ukrainian: курінь, romanized: kurin, pl. Ukrainian: курені, romanized: kureni

The Cossack Hetmanate was divided into military-administrative districts known as regiments (regimental districts; Ukrainian: полк, romanized: polk) whose number fluctuated with the size of the Hetmanate's territory. The first regimental districts were confirmed by the Treaty of Kurukove in 1625, among which were Bila Tserkva Regiment, Kaniv Regiment, Korsun Regiment, Chyhyryn Regiment, Pereiaslav Regiment, Cherkasy Regiment. All of them were situated within the Kyiv Voivodeship. According to the Treaty of Zboriv, there were 23 regiments. In 1649, when the Hetmanate controlled both the right and left banks, it included 16 such districts.

Under Khmelnytskyi, the territory ruled by the hetman included the territories of Kyiv, Bratslav and Chernihiv voivodeships, as well as Zaporozhia and even some Belarusian lands nominally part of Lithuania. In 1667 the signing of Truce of Andrusovo between the Tsardom of Russia and Polish–Lithuanian Commonwealth secured 10 regiments of left-bank Ukraine for Russia, including Kyiv, while the other six stayed in right-bank Ukraine as part of the Polish–Lithuanian Commonwealth.

The regimental districts were further divided into sotnias (Ukrainian: сотня), which were administered by sotnyks (Ukrainian: сотник). The lowest division was the kurin (Ukrainian: курінь). Sotnias were named by the central town, where sotnyk resided with his council.

The capital was the city of Chyhyryn. After the Treaty of Andrusovo, in 1669 the capital was transferred to Baturyn, as Chyhyryn became part of Polish–Lithuanian Commonwealth (located in right-bank Ukraine). After the Sack of Baturyn in 1708 conducted by the Russian army of Aleksandr Menshikov, the area was incorporated into the Kyiv Governorate and the city of Hlukhiv nominally served as the residence of the Hetman.

Zaporozhian Sich enjoyed a distinct status, functioning as an autonomous region known as the Army of Lower Zaporozhia, although according to the Treaty of Eternal Peace of 1686 it was nominally dependent both on the hetman and the tsar. A Cossack administrative system also existed in the neighbouring Sloboda Ukraine, although the region never became part of the Hetmanate and was ruled directly from Moscow.

In 1764-1765, both Cossack Hetmante and Sloboda Ukraine were liquidated and transformed into the Little Russia Governorate and the Sloboda Ukraine Governorate. On the territory of the Zaporozhian Sich the Novorossiya Governorate was created. The general-governor of all Ukrainian territories became Pyotr Rumyantsev-Zadunaisky.

== Economy ==
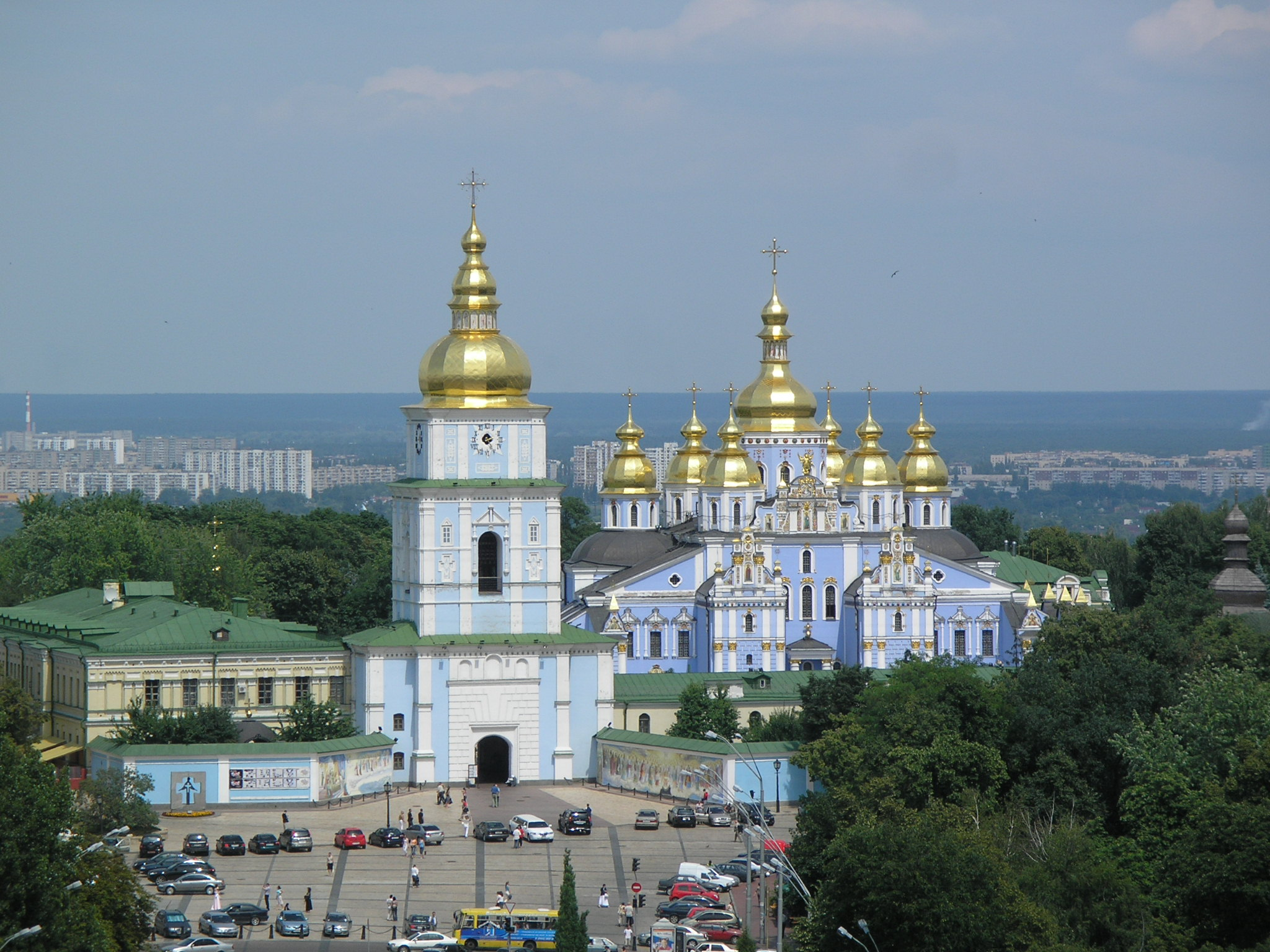
The St. Michael's Golden-Domed Cathedral in Kyiv, built with funds from Hetman Ivan Mazepa

During the entire period of its existence, the economy of the Cossack Hetmanate remained mainly agrarian-feudal, although pan-European trends to increase the number of factories and the share of industry in the sectoral structure of GDP were noticeable.

=== Finances ===
The Hetmanate had its own budget, its own financial system and money circulation. There was a wide system of taxes in the Military Treasury (Ukrainian: Скарбниця Військова, romanized: Skarbnytsia Viiskova). One of the largest sources of revenue was taxes on mills and breweries. Income from the mills was collected by special watchmen. There were redemptions for horilka (Ukrainian: горілка; Ukrainian term for vodka), tar, and tobacco. A significant collection came to the Military Treasury from the beehives. Travel, transit and internal customs duties were charged. In the Hetmanate there was a system of direct taxation of the population. Land rent was also one of the most effective sources of income.

The finances of the Hetmanate were managed by the heneralnyi pidskarbii (Ukrainian: генеральний підскарбій), who headed the Military Treasury, which was renamed the General Treasury Chancellery (Ukrainian: Генеральна скарбова канцелярія, romanized: Heneralna skarbova kantseliariia). During Khmelnytsky's presidency, the hetman personally controlled the financial affairs. The treasury was replenished at the expense of the border trade duty on export and import goods. The population also paid in-kind tribute to the army, land rent, taxes for the production of alcoholic beverages, for the use of mills, rent, ore and tar factories, and the sale of tobacco. Khmelnytsky probably tried to mint his own coin in Chyhyryn, mentions of which date back to 1649 and 1652.

A certain idea of the value of money and goods in the second half of the 18th century is given by the descriptions and valuation in money of the property of Cossacks and peasants of the Mena and Borzna sotnias of the Chernihiv regiment in 1766. So, a log house with hay and a shed cost from 10 to 25 karbovanets, a log barn – 3 karbovanets, a cart for horses – 40 to 50 kopecks, a plow – 12 kopecks, a fattened pig – 1,5 kopecks, a sheep – 50 kopecks, a goose – 10 kopecks, chicken – 2 kopecks, plain coat – 1,2 kopecks, striped hat – 30 kopecks, boots – 20 to 30 kopecks.

=== Agriculture ===
"Ukraine is a very fertile country, as are Ruthenia and Podolia, and once the soil is cultivated, it yields abundant grains (...). (Note: Chevalier goes off on a tangent by claiming that: "la terre pour peu qu'elle soit cultivée, y rapporte tant de grains de toutes sortes, que les habitans ne sçavent la pluspart du temps qu'en faire: leurs rivieres n'estans point navigables." ("The soil, provided it is cultivated, yields such an abundance of grain of all kinds that the inhabitants are at a loss most of the time as to what to do with it: their rivers being unnavigable"). This specific assertion seems to be borrowed directly from the Description of Ukraine, published three years earlier in 1660 by fellow French-officer-in-Polish-service Guillaume Le Vasseur de Beauplan, who wrote: "La fertilité du terroir leur produit du grain en telle abondance, qu'ils ne sçauroient souuent qu'en faire: d'autant qu'ils n'ont pas riuieres nauigables qui se déchargent en la mer , excepté le Boristhene qui arreste la nauigation 50. lieuës au dessous de Kiou par le moyen de 13. sauts qu'on y trouue (...) & c'est ce qui leur empesche de transporter leurs grains en Constantinople." ("The fertility of the soil yields such an abundance of grain that they often do not know what to do with it; all the more so as they have no navigable rivers flowing into the sea, except for the Borysthenes [Dnipro], which is impassable 50 leagues downstream from Kyiv due to 13 rapids found there (...) & this is what prevents them from transporting their grain to Constantinople.")) The large number of [rivers and streams] indicates good soil quality. (...) Ukraine is also very rich in various livestock, game and fish; there is a lot of honey and wax, wood, which, in addition to ordinary consumption, is used for building houses. The inhabitants of Ukraine lack only wine and salt; the former they get from Hungary, Transylvania, Wallachia and Moldavia; beer, honey and vodka are distilled from grain; those are very popular here. Salt they import from the Wieliczka Salt Mine near Kraków, or Pokuttia."

— Pierre Chevalier, French officer (1663)

As the Cossack Hetmanate emerged out of the Polish–Lithuanian Commonwealth, agriculture remained the main branch of the economy. One of the main causes of the Khmelnytsky Uprising was the anti-feudal struggle of the domestic peasantry. Therefore, immediately after the formation of their own state, all the property of the old Polish magnate nobility was expropriated by the people. Magnates, nobility, and tenants were driven out, and their lands, livestock, and property were transferred to Cossacks, peasants, burghers, and the state administration. The legislation of the Polish–Lithuanian Commonwealth lost its force and the peasants became free. The temporary partial return to the old feudal norms after the defeat in the Battle of Berestechko and the Treaty of Bila Tserkva only strengthened the resistance of the peasantry to the "hereditary lords". Finally, on the territory of the Ukrainian state, the folwark (Ukrainian: filvarka) manor system of management, the land ownership of the crown land, Polish and Ukrainian magnates and nobility, and the Catholic Church were eliminated after the victory in the Battle of Batih (1652).

The main part of the liberated territories (and it was a significant land fund: the kingdom owned about 150 cities and towns, magnates and nobles owned about 1,500, and the Catholic Church – 50 estates), as well as uninhabited lands, passed to the state fund, which was owned by the Military Treasury is a component of the apparatus of the Hetman-Starshyna administration. The supreme administrator of the land was the hetman, locally it was managed by colonels and centurions. The lands of Orthodox monasteries and the higher clergy, small nobility, Cossacks and burghers remained in private ownership.

Personally, free peasants had to pay a tax to the Military Treasury in the form of a monetary rent. Peasants of free military villages considered the land they cultivated to be their property. In the second half of the 17th – at the beginning of the 18th century, it was freely inherited, given, sold, bought. In privately owned, temporary-conditional possessions, the peasants' right to use the land was limited, and when buying and selling land, only the right to its possession was transferred with existing coercions in favor of the land owners.

After the Khmelnytsky Uprising, 80-90% of peasants owned land. According to the materials of the Russian general Rumyantsev's description of "Little Russia", the peasants of the Starshyna, monastery, and government were divided into those who owned land and those who were landless. Allotment owners bequeathed land, leased it, bought and sold it, organized farms. The number of wealthy peasants, who concentrated a large part of allotment land and livestock, increased. The landless commoners either engaged in agriculture on senior, monastic, state land allocated to them for temporary use, or lived off the sale of labor. Some landless peasants kept a lot of cattle, beehives, were engaged in crafts and trades. Some of them had up to 30 to 40 heads of cattle, 20 to 30 pigs, 30 to 40 horses, and up to 300 sheep. Some peasants, the so-called servants, did not have any farms and constantly lived in the foreman's estates either "for subsistence" or for an annual fee (2 to 10 karbovanets).

=== Starshyna land ownership ===
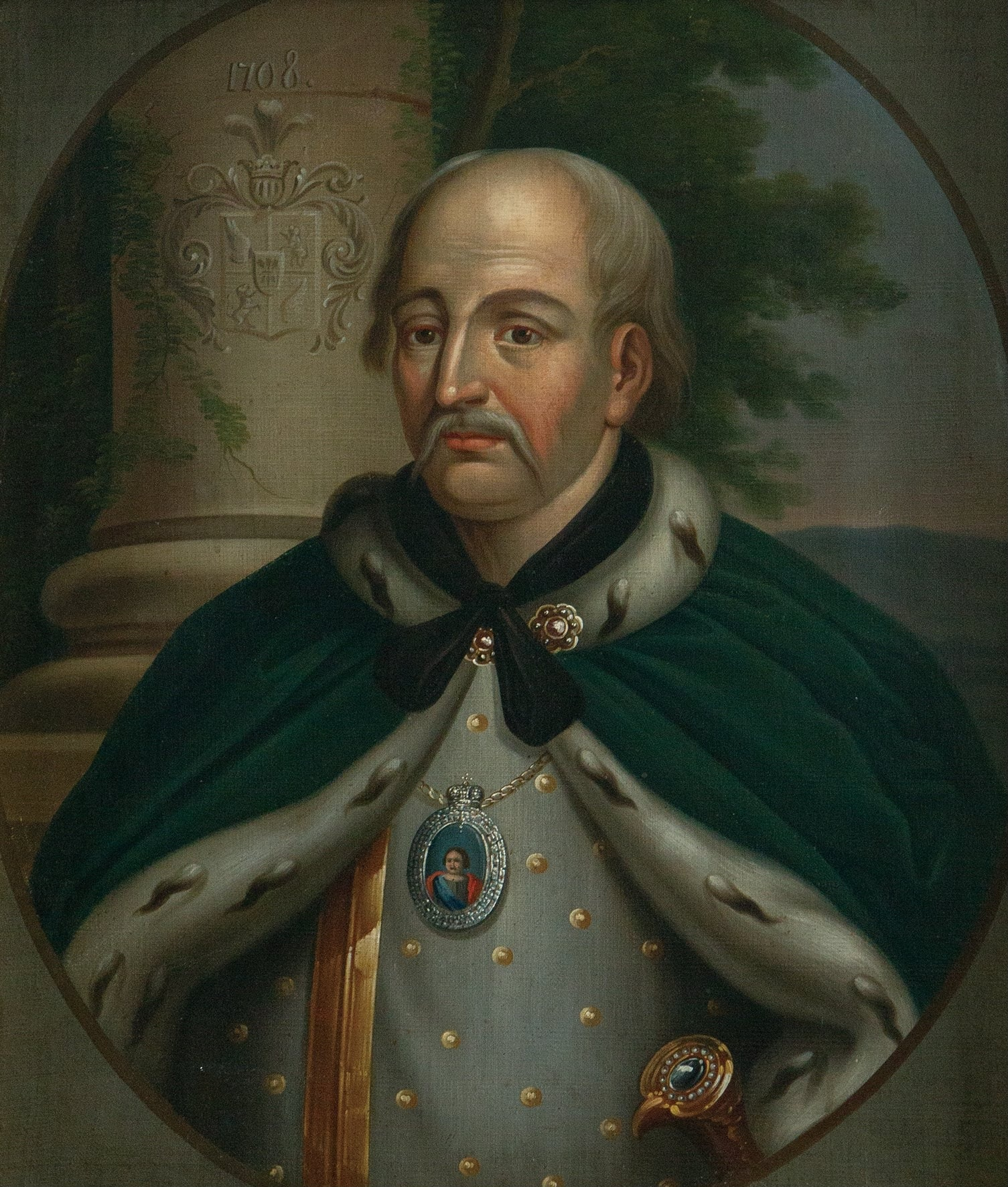
Hetman Ivan Skoropadsky. One of the largest landowners, he had about 20,000 peasants.

From the very beginning of the existence of the state, Starshyna land ownership existed in two forms: private (hereditary) and rank (temporary). The Starshyna's attempt to take possession of the estates of the exiled Polish and Ukrainian lords did not find support from Khmelnytsky, who in his policy took into account the interests of hereditary Cossacks, the intransigence of peasants and ordinary Cossacks to the restoration of feudal land ownership. The Starshyna society increased land ownership at the expense of buying land from Cossacks and peasants. As a reward for serving in the Cossack army, the sergeant received land, villages and towns from the state land fund for his "rank" (position). These were temporary possessions, similar to the Western European benefice.

Later, the hetmans were actively involved in the gradual distribution of state lands among their followers. The data of the General Investigation of Estates (Ukrainian: Генеральне слідство про маєтності, romanized: Heneralne slidstvo pro maietnosti) about the growth of Starshyna land ownership in the second half of the 17th and early 18th centuries was conducted in 1729–1730 in order to regulate land relations. Only in the Chernihiv, Starodub, Nizhyn, Pereiaslav, and Lubny regiments that 518 settlements passed into the ownership of the Starshyna until 1708. In the 1730s, already more than 35% of the cultivated land of the Hetmanate was the private property of the Starshyna. The sources of the growth of Starshyna land ownership were: the pledge of free lands; acquisition, often forced, or seizure of Cossack and peasant lands; hetman grants and awards of the tsarist government "for service to the great sovereign" from the fund of free military estates. Under Danylo Apostol, the main land fund was distributed. The difference between hereditary and temporary conditional ownership has practically disappeared.

=== Monastery (church) land ownership ===
During the second half of the 17th and the first quarter of the 18th centuries monastic and church land ownership increased significantly due to the acquisition and seizure of Cossack-peasant and public lands. According to the General Investigation of Estates, in 1729–1730 in nine regiments (except Starodub), monasteries owned 305 estates and 11,073 yards of the commons, which was more than 20% of the total number of yards.

The Hetman-Starshyna administration tried to limit monastic land ownership. On the submission of Danylo Apostol, the tsarist government by decree of 1728 prohibited spiritual landowners from buying land, only allowed private individuals to bequeath it to monasteries. Monasteries had a monopoly on distilling and trading vodka in their estates. The church obtained the right to free ownership of a part of public lands in the form of donations. Communities allocated courtyards, fields, and hayfields to priests for farming.

=== Industry ===
The 17th and 18th centuries were the period of the turbulent process of the emergence and development of cities, the growth of their role in the economic life of Ukraine. However, unlike the cities of Western Europe, they retained their feudal and agrarian character and were small. The process of formation of the industrial and commercial population was slow. According to the census of 1666, in 36 cities of left-bank Ukraine, 26% of residents were artisans. As a result of the policy of the Moscow authorities, which limited the development of Ukrainian industry, at the end of the 18th century, among the population of the Hetmanate, artisans made up a small number: in Chernihiv – 4,5%, in Hadiach – 16% of all residents. Significant craft centers were Nizhyn – 42,3% of artisans' yards, Starodub – 48,5%. 4,000 artisans worked in Kyiv.

In the 1720s, under the influence of the transformations of Peter I, the construction of large centralized factories began in the Hetmanate. The emergence of manufactories took place in two ways: small enterprises were transformed into large independent productions, workshops were subordinated to merchant capital, which actively penetrated into production. A particularly favorable environment for the emergence of manufacturing production was urban and rural industries. They were not limited to shop workshops, therefore they were more suitable for the introduction of new mechanical processes, progressive forms of organization of production and work. A cadre of permanent workers was being formed who lived off earnings in industry.

Distillation (brewing, mead-making) was developed. Raw materials for the production of vodka and beer were rye, barley, buckwheat, oats, and wheat. Small distilleries and breweries operated in every farm, estate, and village of Ukraine. Distilling yielded a profit 2-4 times higher than the sale of bread. At the end of the 18th century, there were more than 10,000 guralenes. In the Hetmanate and the Sloboda Ukraine region, distilleries belonged to monasteries, the Cossack Starshyna, merchants, burghers, Cossacks and peasants. By the end of the 18th century, distilling had completely passed to the nobility. In the 18th century, most distilleries were small-scale. A certain part of them in terms of size and equipment belonged to the initial forms of manufactories. These were large distilleries, they were served by an average of 14 people. Distillation had a high degree of marketability. We bought raw materials, fuel, equipment, sold products – retail in taverns, wholesale. Metallurgical production continued to develop, the most common form of which was ore mining.

A special place in the industry belonged to the production of saltpeter. The center of this industry was the basins of the Psel, Vorskla, Oril, lower Dnieper and Buh Rivers, the areas near Chuhuiv and Putyvl. During the period of Polish-noble rule, there were almost 20 saltpeter factories, the production of which was monopolized by the Polish government. During the Uprising in the middle of the 17th century, the saltpeter works were controlled by the Cossack army. In the 18th century, state-owned and private saltpeter vats were built, belonging to Cossack Starshyna, Cossacks and townspeople. The raw material for obtaining saltpeter was the soil of hillforts, old graves, fortress ramparts and ashes. From the 1740s, the artificial on-board method of producing saltpeter spread. From the end of the 1730s, saltpeter companies were organized: Oposhnianska (united saltpeter producers of Opishnia), merchant Shchedrov, Russian (plants were in the Kharkiv Governorate and Poltava Regiment), and others. The main buyer of Ukrainian saltpeter in the 18th century was the Russian treasury. The forced sales system had a negative impact on the development of saltpeter production. The treasury owed a lot to the factory owners. Only in the 1790s, the free sale of saltpeter, which remained from the supply to the treasury, was allowed. This contributed to the expansion of saltpeter production.

== Culture ==
The Hetmanate coincided with a period of cultural flowering in Ukraine, particularly during the reign of hetman Ivan Mazepa.

=== Dwelling ===
In the construction of dwellings, for a long time, the type of "house in two halves" characteristic of Ukrainian housing was preserved,but in the case of the Cossack Starshyna society, they differed in the number of rooms and interior decoration. In many respects, the interior of the home of the Cossack Starshyna still resembled folk dwellings. The traditions of painting windows, doors, strollers, and baby carriages were preserved. The inner walls of the houses were covered with wallpaper. The rooms were decorated with carpets made by local artisans. Stoves for heating were lined with tiles. They bought mirrors, chandeliers, dishes of silver and porcelain, teapots, coffee pots, spoons, knives, beer bottles, silver trays, cups, etc.

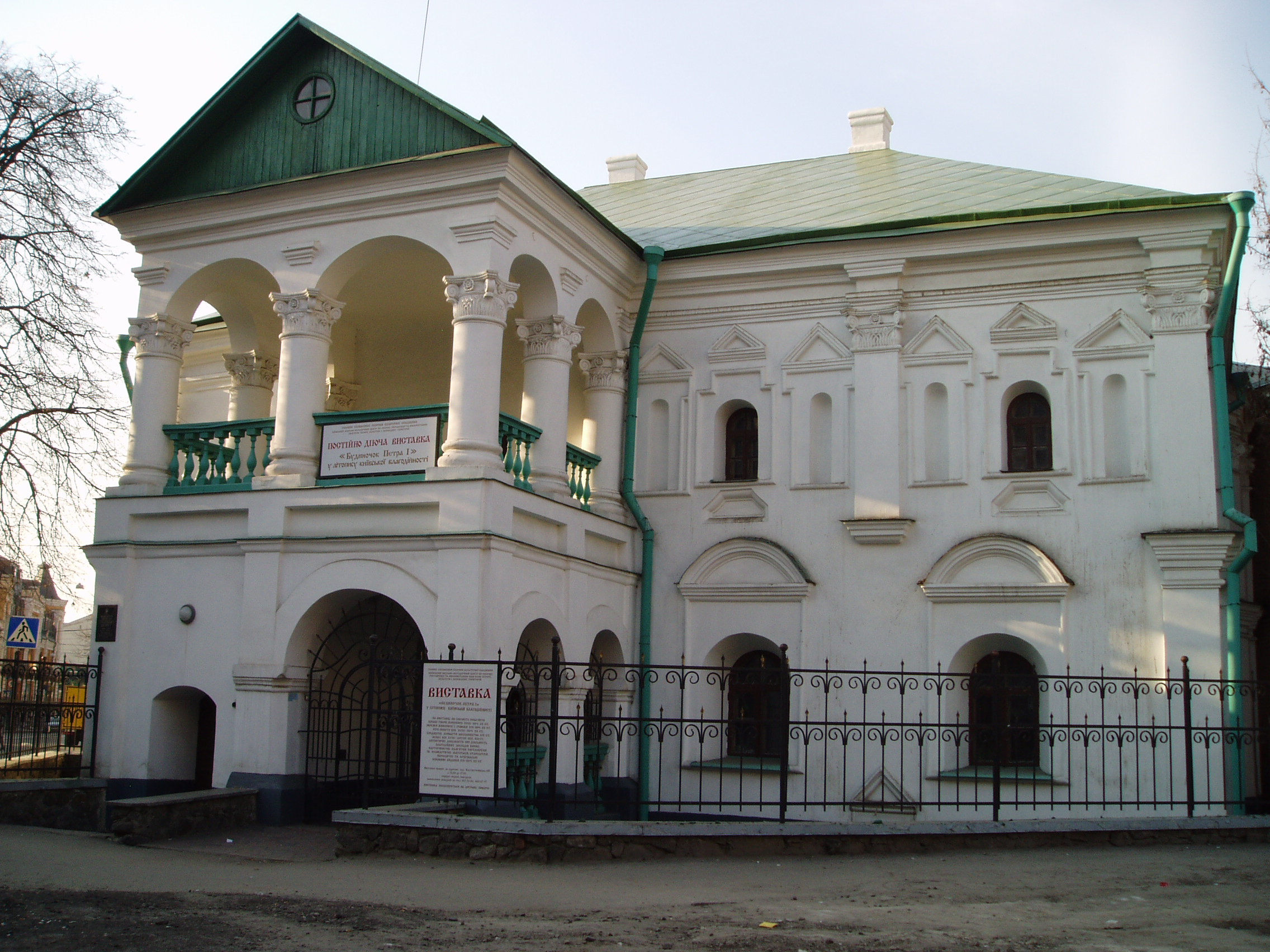
Bykovsky Tenement

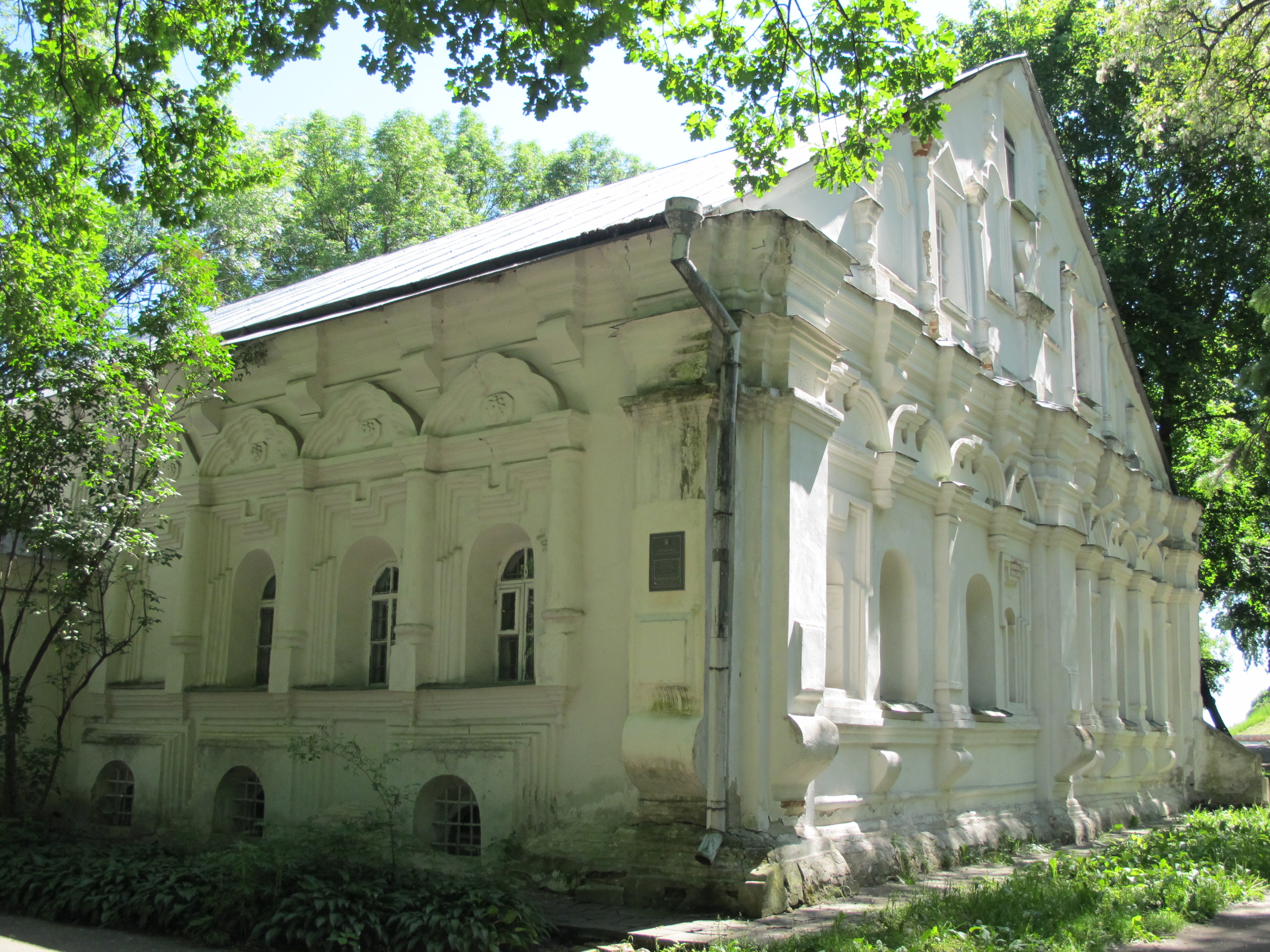
Lyzohub Tenement

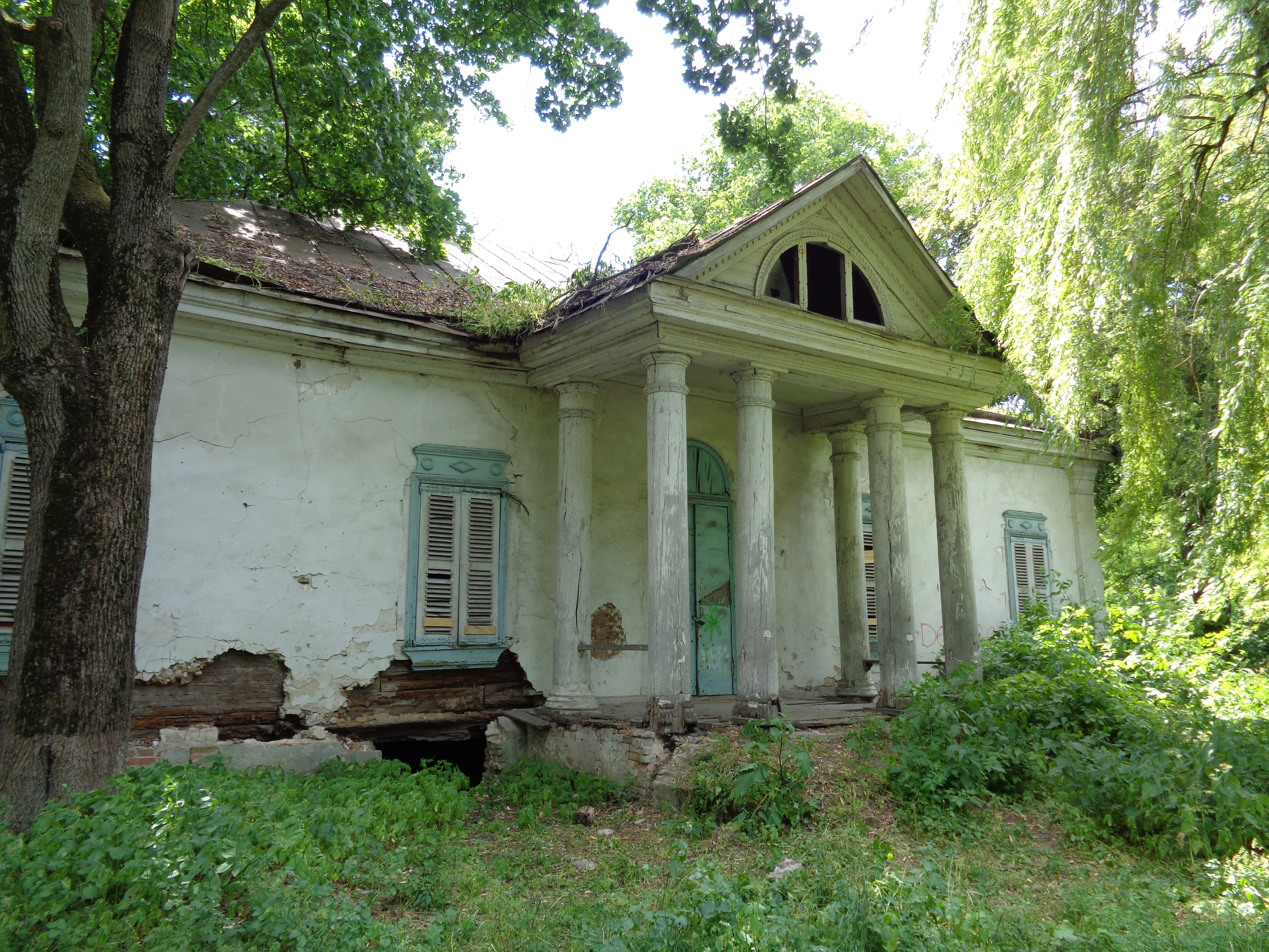
Pokorschyna Estate

=== Clothing and accessories ===
Clothes do not only perform a purely utilitarian function, but are also the subject of aesthetic tastes and preferences that form a style characteristic of different eras. In general, the clothes of the Starshyna society, both male and female, did not differ from the Eastern European style of the time. Men's zhupan (robes), kuntush, various belts were worn both in the Polish-Lithuanian Commonwealth and in Ukraine, just like the women's clothing – skirts, corsets (laces) were typical for the whole of Europe in the 18th century. The elements of the outfit differed, presumably, in the details of the cut, decorativeness, while the fabrics used were common to all of Europe: velvet, satin, brocade, taffeta, textile, silk, which were imported to Ukraine from Silesia and Saxony. Trade in these goods was conducted very actively, which indicates the demand for them.

Interestingly, the clothes had value not only for women. According to sources, including diaries and property descriptions, men also attached importance to their wardrobe, although it was not as varied. The basic outerwear for men, kuntush, zhupan or kaftan, has been traditional for a long time. Zhupans or kaftans are mentioned in documents of the 16th century. Silk and cloth belts were quite expensive. In Ukraine, as well as in the Polish-Lithuanian Commonwealth, zhupans and kuntush remained the main men's clothing until the end of the 18th century. The clothes of a Cossack Starshyna indicated belonging to a certain society, where the accepted style prevailed. At the same time, there was a formation of an individual style that distinguished a person among a certain social group. Clothes also had a family value. It was a tradition to leave the clothes of the deceased in the family, giving away some of them after death. Among the things that were given great importance in the Starshyna society were jewelry. This can be traced to dowry registers, wills, property descriptions. Jewels, which are ornaments made of gold, silver, various precious stones – rubies, emeralds, sapphires, diamonds, pearls, corals – were called "jewels". They were used as capital investments, for example, to provide a dowry for daughters, and at the same time had a symbolic value, certifying status of their master, and were also family heirlooms.

=== Food ===
The household was important not only because it was the main source of livelihood for the master and his family, but also because it was the main support for military service. The fighting capacity of the Cossack army, the duration of military operations, and often the outcome of the entire war depended on the supply of food. Daily food was fish. It was dried, salted and boiled. The typical food of the Cossacks was varenyky (dumplings), halushky, borshch. The Cossacks consumed mainly boiled, stewed and baked food, thus, peculiar taste stereotypes and habits developed. Popular food in the Sich was porridge-like dishes made from various grains: solomakha (Ukrainian: соломаха), teteria (Ukrainian: тетеря), shcherba (Ukrainian: щерба), bratko (Ukrainian: братко). Kulish (Ukrainian: куліш) was also often prepared. One of the peculiarities of the Cossack diet was the insignificant consumption of baked bread, because there was not always enough flour. One of the most famous first courses is the Cossack teteria, which is quite similar to the kulish. Simple and easy-to-prepare meals were nutritious, but above all, they kept for a long time. Eastern influence is also felt on the derivative cuisine. Teteria and solomakha became dishes that were formed on the steppe spaces in close contact with nomads.

Meat was an essential addition to the diet of the Cossacks both in summer and in winter. The food reserves of the Cossacks were constantly replenished. Those who lived in winter quarters especially tried. Their main task was to supply the Cossacks with various foods – from meat, flour, lard, cereals to vegetables and fruits. During military campaigns, the diet was completely different, and the set of products also changed. When going on a campaign, a Cossack had to take with him a supply of food, which should last for several months. That is why they took something that did not spoil and could be used for a long time on the road. The basis of the ration in the campaigns was sukhari (rusks), cereals, flour, salo (salo is a high-calorie product – more was used in reserve: it can be stored for a long time, and also used in canning products). Cossacks carried water in wooden trunks tied to the saddle. Fishing nets were also taken on hikes. Among the sweet dishes in Cossack times, the following were known: kvas (Ukrainian: квас), kutia (Ukrainian: кутя) with honey, kutia with poppy seeds and nuts, rice with honey and cinnamon, kutia with raisins and nuts, soup made of dried apples, plums and cherries (uzvar). Traditional local tonic drinks were weak beer and fruit kvas.

In general, the food was divided into daily, festive and fasting. There were differences in the diet of wealthy Cossacks and the poor. Often the poor were satisfied with empty borshch (without meat), fish and sauerkraut. Food was cooked in an oven (in the winter in the house, in the kitchen, in the summer in the summer kitchen or in the summer oven in the yard). Every family needed simple utensils: a Dutch oven (Ukrainian: чавун, romanized: chavun), bowls, pans, rohachi (Ukrainian: рогачі), pokers.

=== Education ===
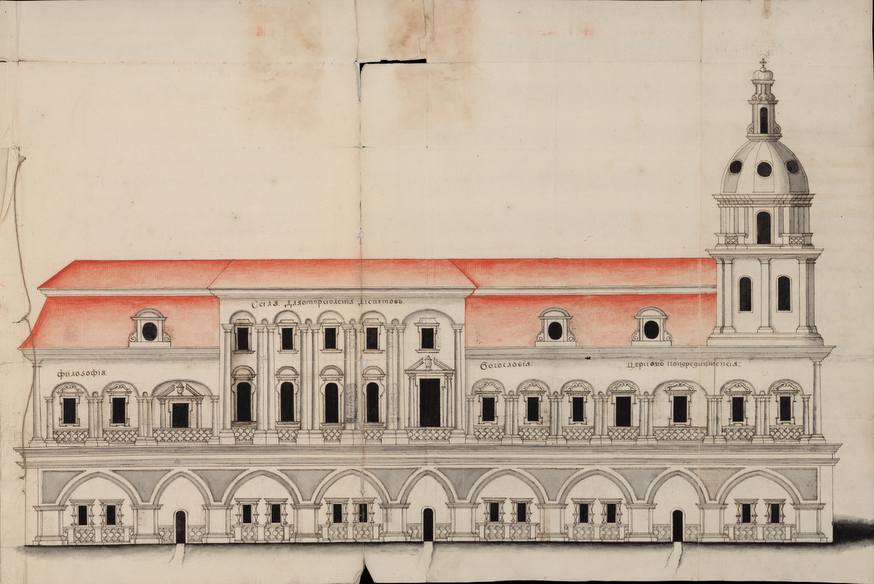
Kyiv-Mohyla Academy

Visitors from abroad commented on the high level of literacy, even among commoners, in the Hetmanate. There was a higher number of elementary schools per population in the Hetmanate than in either neighboring Russia or Poland. In the 1740s, of 1,099 settlements within seven regimental districts, as many as 866 had primary schools. Paul of Aleppo, travelling through what is now Ukraine in 1654 and 1656, wrote: "[...] throughout the whole of the Kozak Land, we noted а beautiful trait which aroused our interest: they аll almost without exception, even their wives and daughters, know how to read and know the order of the mass and the church song." A German visitor to the Hetmanate, writing in 1720, commented on how the son of Hetman Danylo Apostol, who had never left Ukraine, was fluent in the Latin, Italian, French, German, Polish and Russian languages. Under Mazepa, the Kyiv collegium was transformed into an academy and attracted some of the leading scholars of the Orthodox world. It was the largest educational institution in lands ruled by Russia. Mazepa established another collegium in Chernihiv. These schools largely used the Polish and Latin languages and provided a classic western education to their students. Many of those trained in Kyiv – such as Feofan Prokopovich – would later move to Moscow, so that Ivan Mazepa's patronage not only raised the level of culture in Ukraine but also in Moscow itself. A musical academy was established in 1730 in the Hetmanate's then-capital of Hlukhiv. Among its graduates were Maksym Berezovsky (the first composer from the Russian Empire to be recognized in Europe) and Dmitry Bortniansky.

In addition to traditional printing presses in Kyiv, new printing shops were established in Novhorod-Siverskyi and Chernihiv. Most of the books published were religious in nature, such as the Peternik, a book about the lives of the monks of the Kyiv-Pechersk monasatary. Books on local history were compiled. In a book written by Inokentiy Gizel in 1674, the theory that Moscow was the heir of ancient Kyiv was developed and elaborated for the first time.

=== Leisure ===
Among the cultural and educational interests that characterize the leisure time of a Cossack Starshyna, there is a passion for music. A love of music, singing, and dancing was cultivated in the Cossack Starshyna environment. Things that brought aesthetic pleasure, provided comfort to everyday life, were musical instruments. Keyboard instruments such as the clavichord were widespread. Also violin and horns, husli (Ukrainian: гуслі), and bandura (Ukrainian: бандура). While on a campaign, the Starshyna society danced, on church holidays they sang. Cossacks were extremely fond of church singing.

A common phenomenon of the cultural life of the Hetmanate was the performances of the so-called traveling diaks (Ukrainian: дяки), students of the Kyiv-Mohyla Academy or collegiums, who earned money for living and studying during the holidays by performing popular acts – interludes. There was also such a kind of intellectual pursuit of time as a game of chess. Among the popular leisure activities was playing cards, especially in winter. In 1727, such card games as picket, lumberjack, and fantas were mentioned. They played for money, sometimes a present could be, for example, a horse. Often the Starshyna had large apiaries and treated this business not only as a source of income, but also liked to rest there. Also, drinking coffee became a certain means of rest and relaxation in the environment of the Starshyna society.

The free time of the Cossacks was filled with various physical exercises: competitions in swimming, running, rowing, wrestling, fistfights, etc. All these and other exercises had a military orientation and were a good means of physical training of the Cossacks. Among the Zaporozhian Cossacks, various systems of martial arts have become widespread. The most famous formed the basis of the Cossack hopak (Ukrainian: гопак) dance.

=== Religion ===
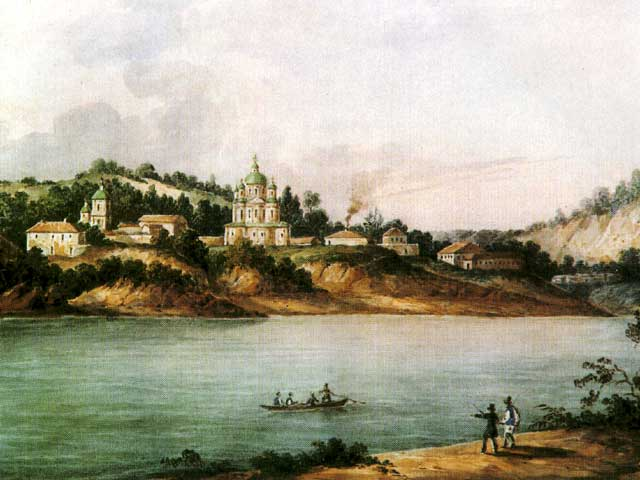
The Mezhyhirskyi Monastery, located on the right bank of the Dnieper.

In 1620, the Ecumenical Patriarch of Constantinople reestablished the Kyiv Metropolis for the Eastern Orthodox communities that refused to join the Union of Brest. In 1686 the Orthodox Church in Ukraine changed from being under the jurisdiction of the Patriarch in Constantinople to being under the authority of the Patriarch of Moscow. Nevertheless, before and after this date local Church leaders pursued a policy of independence. Hetman Ivan Mazepa established very close relations with Metropolitan Varlaam Iasynsky (reigned 1690–1707). Mazepa provided donations of land, money and entire villages to the Church. He also financed the building of numerous churches in Kyiv, including the Church of the Epiphany and the cathedral of St. Michael's Golden-Domed Monastery, and restoration of older churches such as Saint Sophia Cathedral in Kyiv, which had deteriorated to near ruin by the mid-17th century, in a style known as Ukrainian Baroque.

== Society ==
The social structure of the Hetmanate consisted of five groups: the nobility, the Cossacks, the clergy, the townspeople, and the peasants.

=== Nobles ===
As had been the case under Poland, the nobility continued to be the dominant social class during the Hetmanate, although its composition and source of legitimacy within the new society had changed radically. During the Khmelnytsky Uprising, the Polish nobles and Polonized Ruthenian magnates fled the territory of the Hetmanate. As a result, the noble estate now consisted of a merger between the nobility that had stayed in the territory of the Hetmanate (old noble families that did not succumb to Polonization and lesser nobles who had participated in the uprising on the side of the Cossacks against Poland) with members of the emergent Cossack officer class. Unlike the Polish nobles whose lands were redistributed, the nobles loyal to the Hetmanate retained their privileges, their lands, and the services of the peasants. Together, the old nobles and the new Cossack officers became known as the Distinguished Military Fellows (Znachni Viiskovi Tovaryshi). Thus, the nature of noble status was fundamentally changed. It no longer depended on ancient heredity, but instead on loyalty to the Hetmanate. Over time, however, Cossack officer lands and privileges too became hereditary, and the Cossack noble and officer class acquired huge landed estates comparable to those of the Polish-Ruthenian magnates whom they had replaced and emulated.

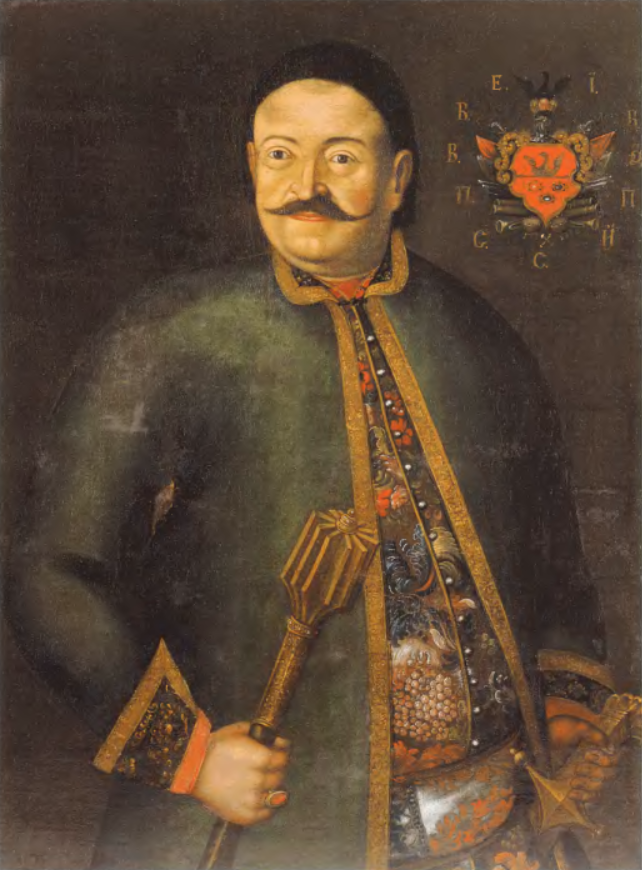
Semen Sulyma

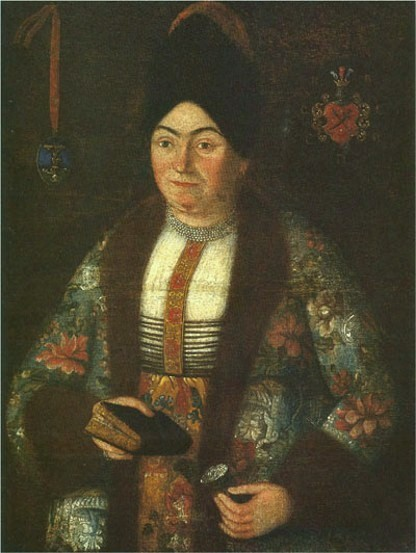
Paraskeva Sulyma

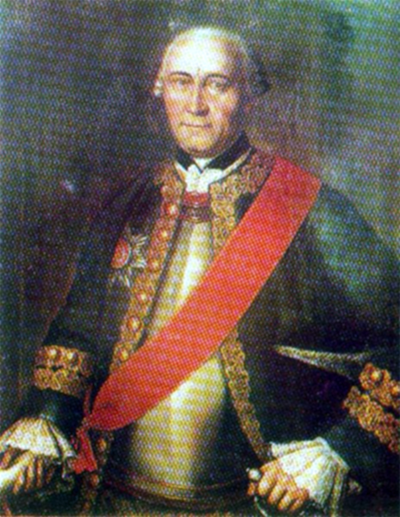
Vasyl Hudovych

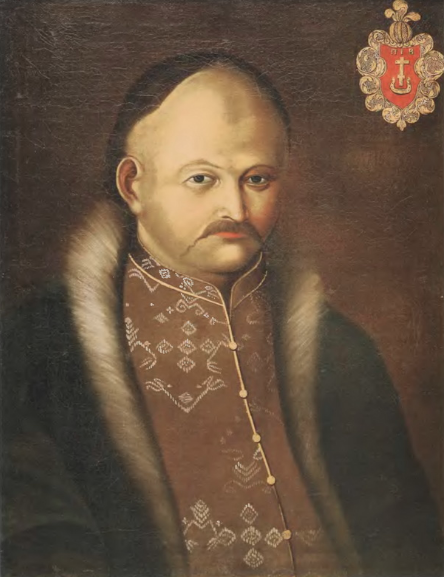
Petro Voitsekhovych

=== Cossacks ===
Most Cossacks failed to enter the noble estate and continued their role as free soldiers. The lower rank Cossacks often resented their wealthier brethren and were responsible for frequent rebellions, particularly during the Ruin, a period of instability and civil war in the 17th century. These resentments were frequently exploited by Russia. The Zaporizhian Sich served as a refuge for Cossacks fleeing the Hetmanate as it had been prior to Khmelnytsky's uprising.

During the 1760s, Cossacks comprised approximately 45% of the Hetmanate's population. After 1735, Cossacks that were not part of starshyna, were split into Elected Cossacks (Ukrainian: виборні козаки) and Helper Cossacks (Ukrainian: підпомічники). Cossack privileges were preserved only for elected Cossacks, who were exempted from any duties, but were obliged to perform military service in person with their own equipment, weapons and horses.

Similarly to Cossack starshyna, noble szlachta identity became widespread amongst ordinary Cossacks. Both Cossack and szlachta terms were used as synonyms. For example a total of 35.2% of appeals to the Poltava city court in 1777-1780 concerned insults of the noble honor. Similar lawsuits came from both starshyna and ordinary Cossacks, which suggest to the existence in the Cossack society of that period of ideas that were very similar to the ideas of the nobility of the Polish-Lithuanian Commonwealth of the XVII century.

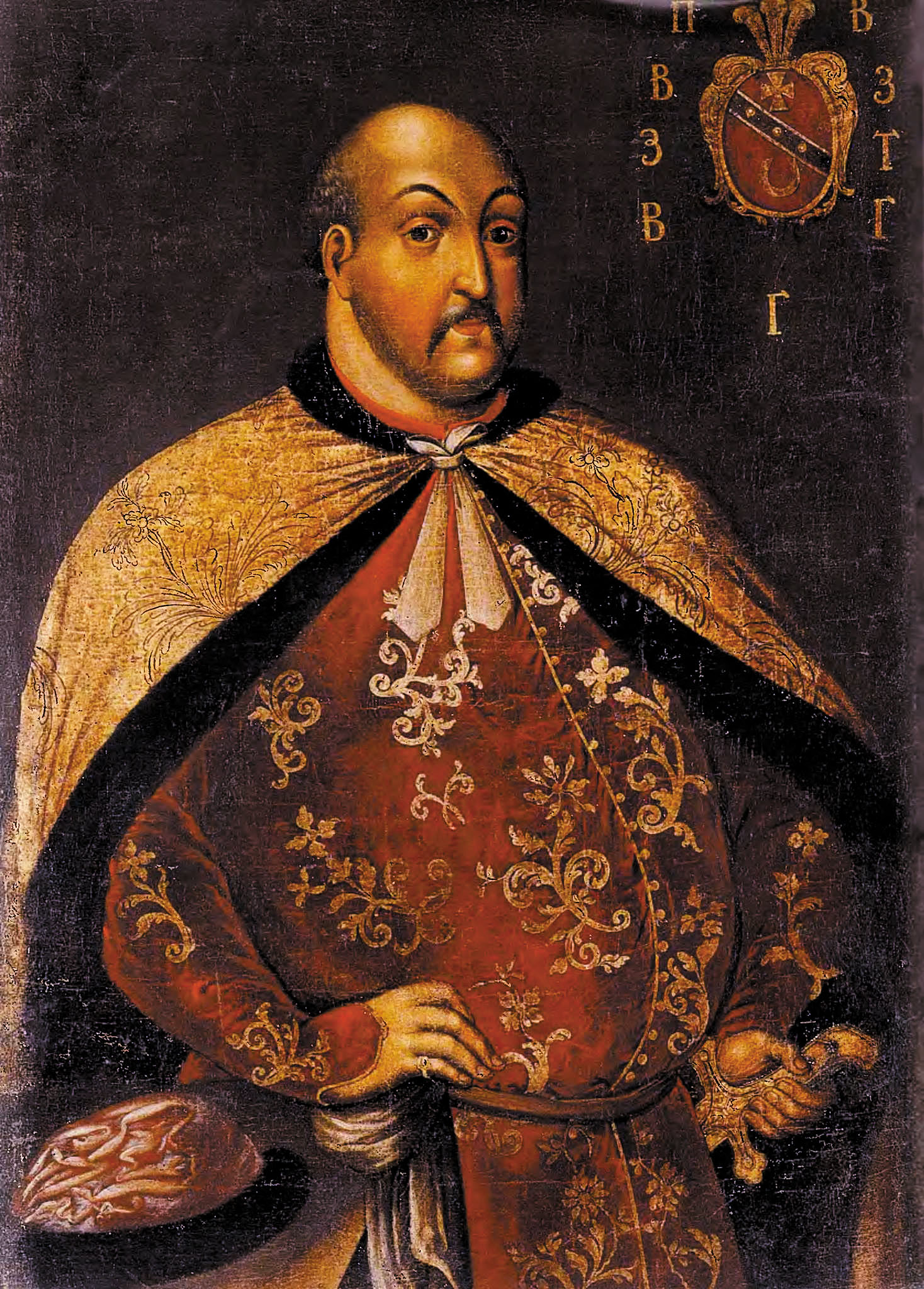
Cossack colonel

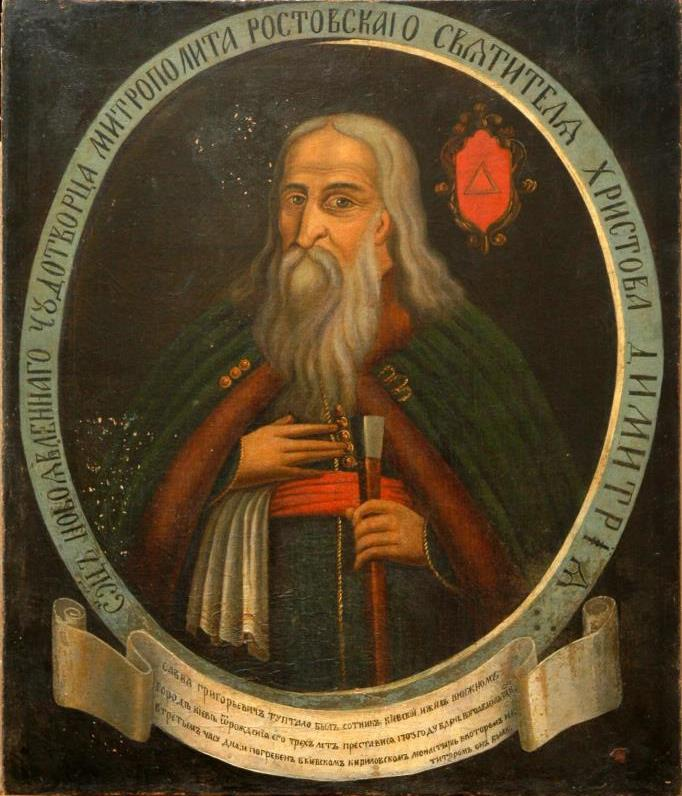
Cossack captain

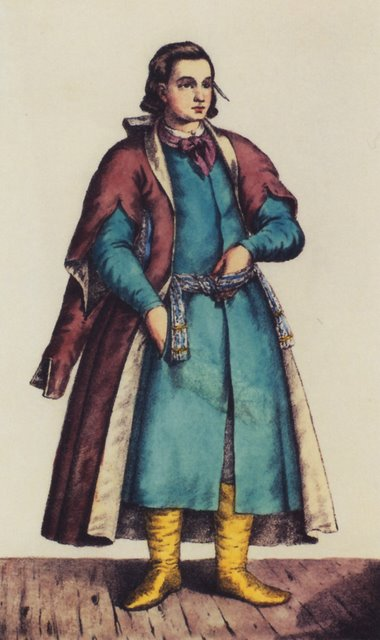
Cossack secretary

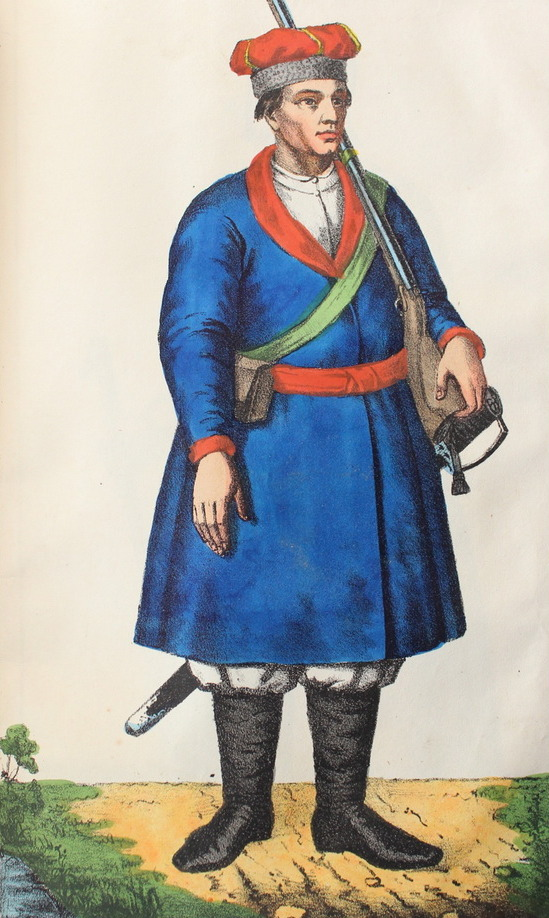
Cossack private

=== Clergy ===
During the Hetmanate, the Roman Catholic Church and Uniate clergy were driven from Ukraine. The "black", or monastic, Orthodox clergy enjoyed a very high status in the Hetmanate, controlling 17% of the Hetmanate's land. Monasteries were exempt from taxes and at no times were peasants bound to monasteries allowed to forgo their duties. The Orthodox hierarchy became as wealthy and powerful as the most powerful nobles. The "white", or married, Orthodox clergy were also exempt from paying taxes. Priests' sons often entered the clergy or the Cossack civil service. It was not uncommon for nobles or Cossacks to become priests and vice versa.

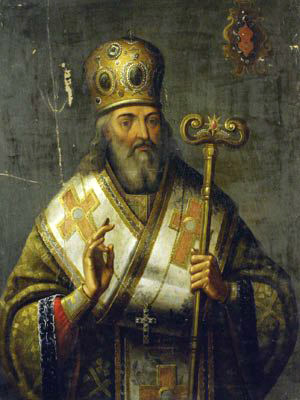
Dionysius Balaban

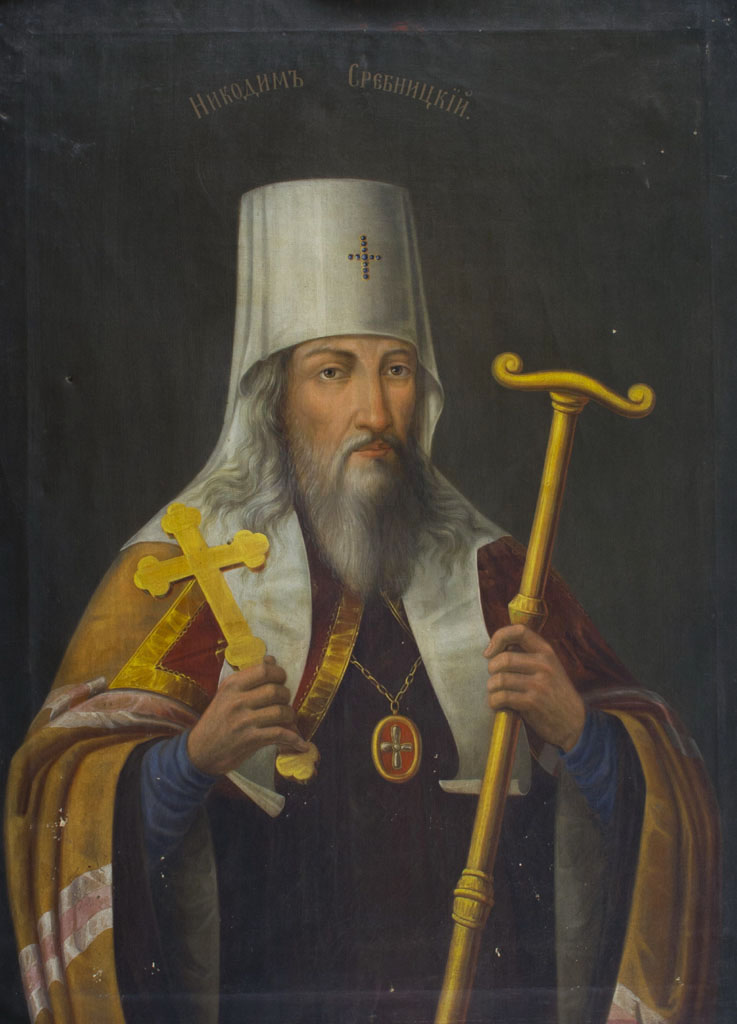
Nykodym Skrebnytsky

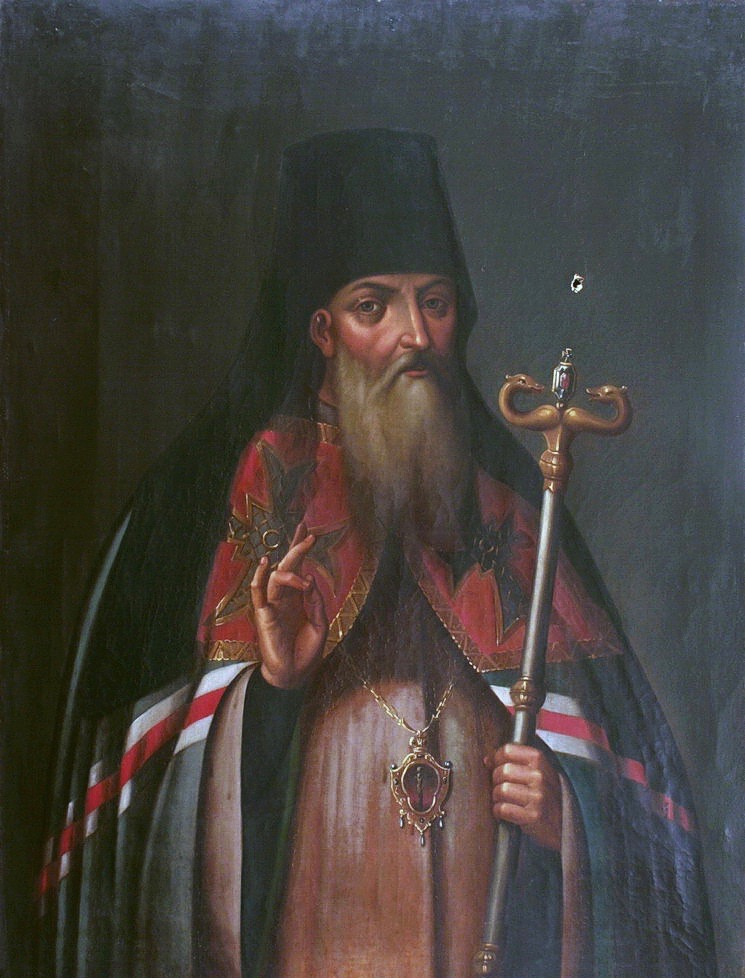
Arsenii Berlo

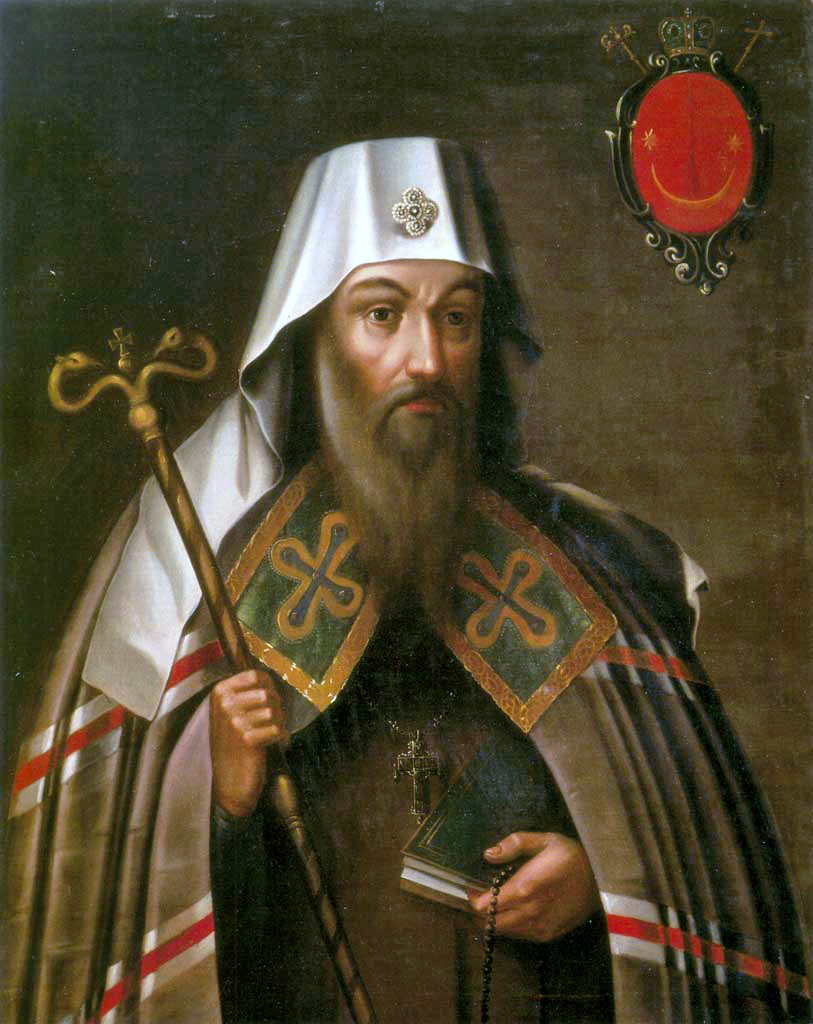
Varlaam Yasynsky

=== Townspeople ===
Twelve cities within the Hetmanate enjoyed Magdeburg rights, in which they were self-governing and controlled their own courts, finances and taxes. Wealthy townsmen were able to hold office within the Hetmanate or even to buy titles of nobility. Because the towns were generally small (the largest towns of Kyiv and Nizhyn had no more than 15,000 inhabitants), this social group was not very significant relative to other social groups.

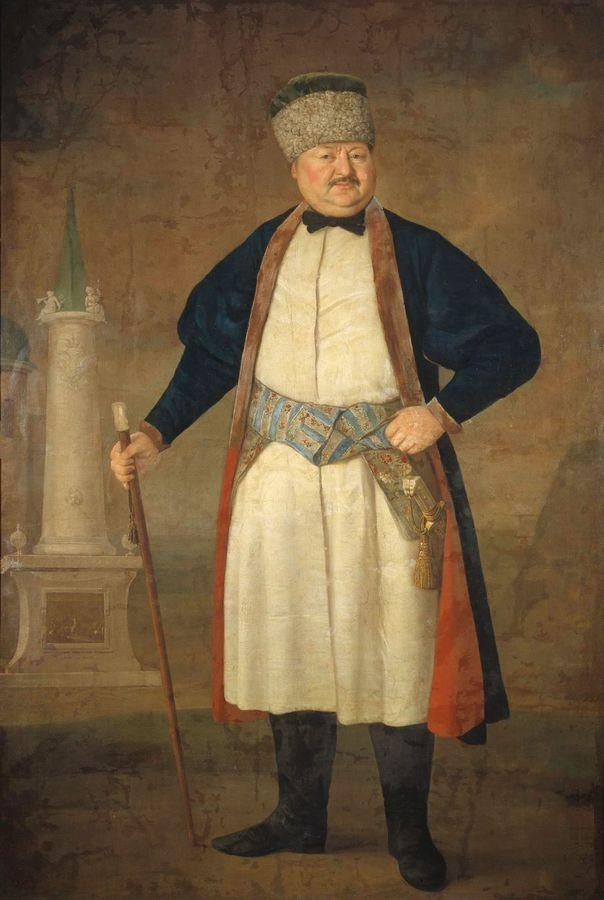
Burgomaster of Poltava

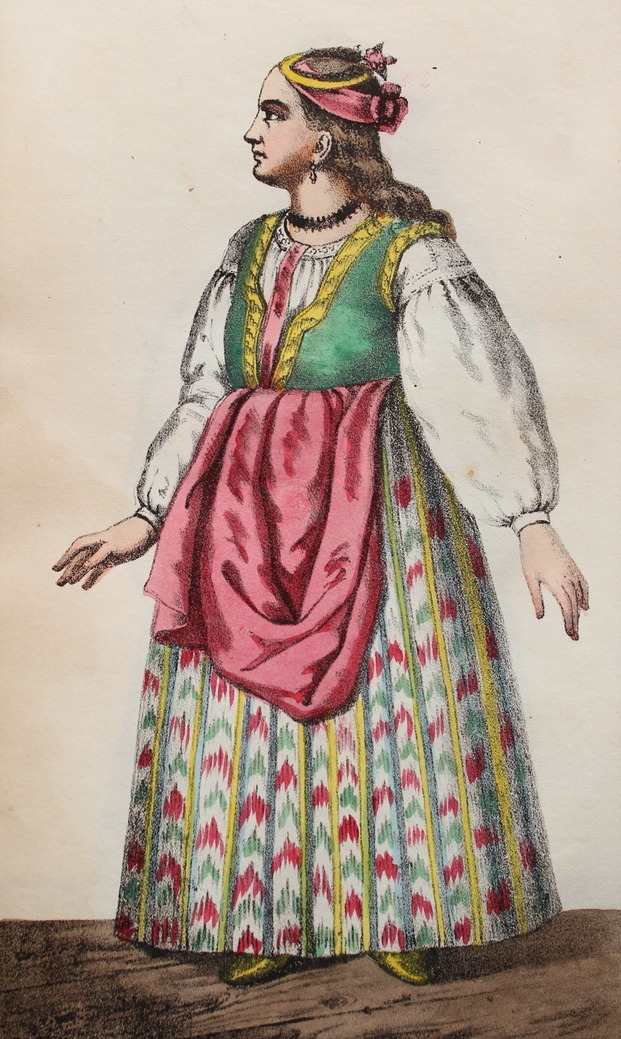
City girl

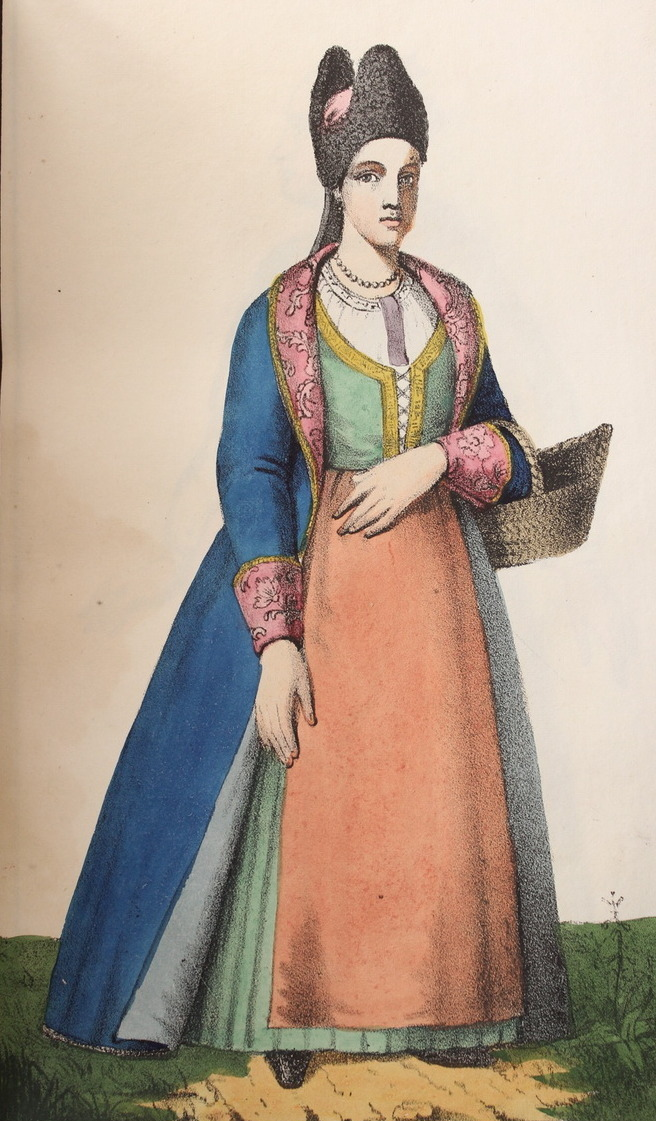
City woman

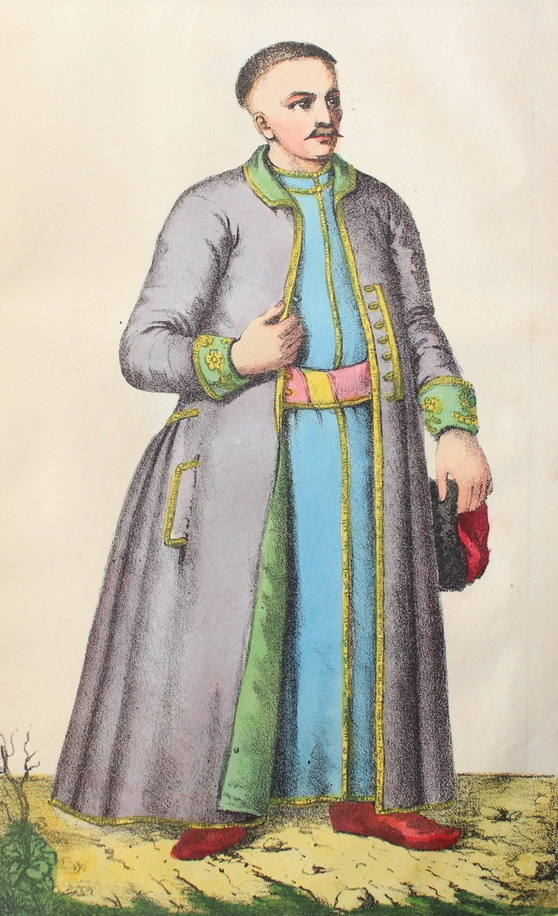
Townsman

=== Peasants ===
Peasants comprised the majority of the Hetmanate's population. Although the institution of forced labor by the peasants was reduced significantly by the Khmelnytsky Uprising, in which the Polish and Ruthenian landlords and magnates were expelled from the territory controlled by the Hetman, those nobles loyal to the Hetman as well as the Orthodox Church expected the peasants under their control to continue to provide their services. Thus as a result of the uprising, approximately 50% of the territory consisted of lands given to Cossack officers or free self-governing villages controlled by the peasants, 33% of the land was owned by Cossack officers and nobles, and 17% of the land was owned by the Church. With time, the amount of territory owned by the nobles and officers gradually grew at the expense of the lands owned by peasants and rank-and-file Cossacks, and the peasants were forced to work increasingly more days for their landlords. Nevertheless, their obligations remained lighter than they had been prior to the uprising; and until the end of the Hetmanate, peasants were never fully enserfed and retained the right to move.

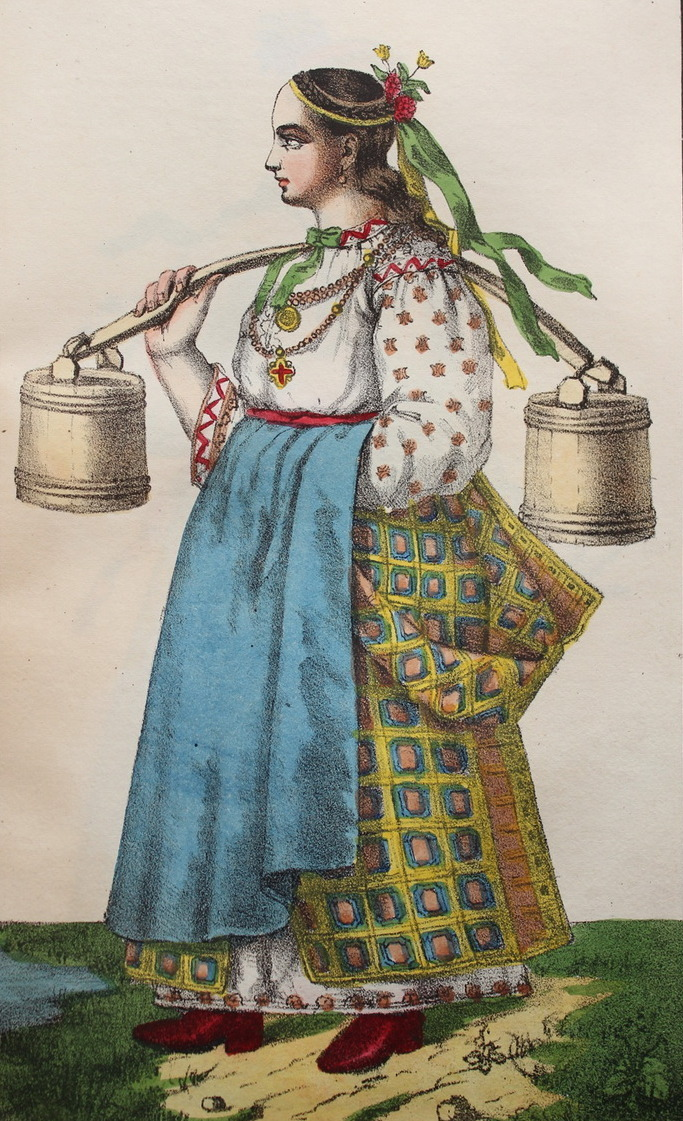
Peasant girl

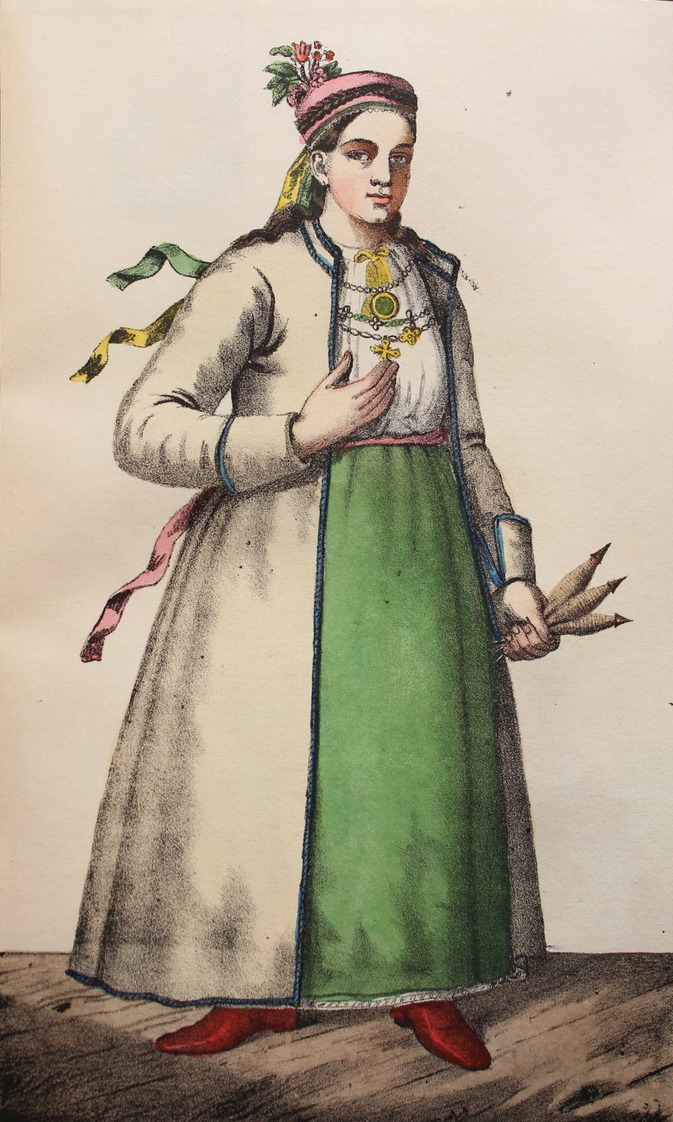
Peasant girl

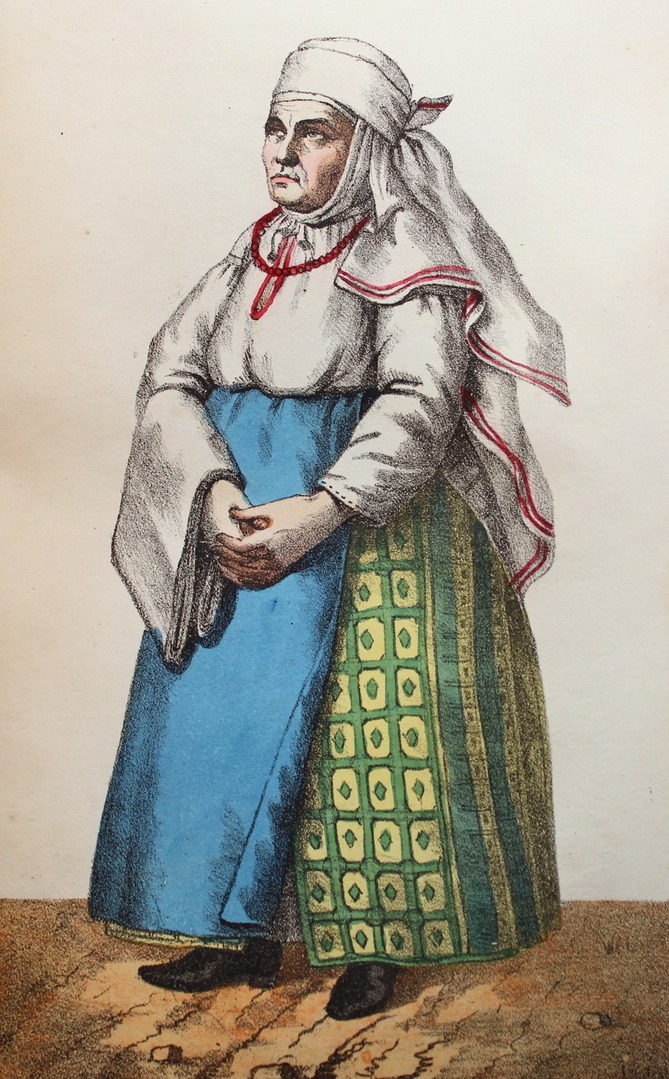
Peasant woman

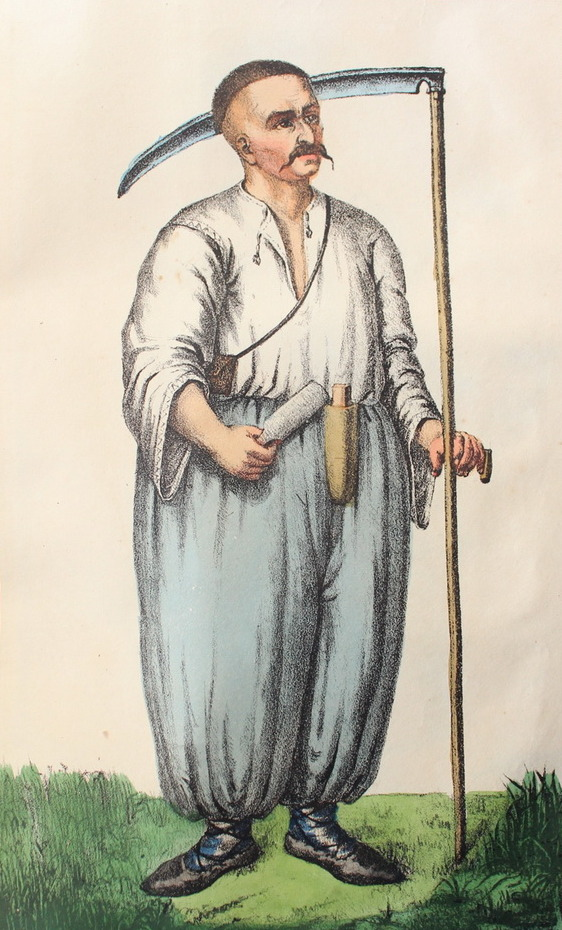
Peasant man

== Legacy ==
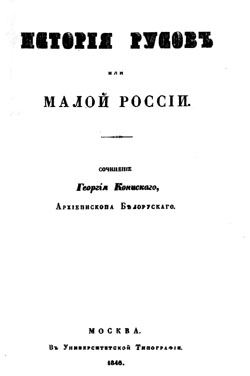
Front page of the History of Ruthenians, published in 1846

The foundation of the Cossack state by Bohdan Khmelnytskyi played an important role in Ukrainian history, as for the first time a major part of ethnic Ukrainian lands were united under one rule as part of a de-facto independent polity. As a result, the Hetmanate's legacy was used as an inspiration in attempts to establish an independent Ukrainian state in the following centuries.

In 1785, ten years after the dissolution of the Hetmanate's autonomy by the Russian Empire, Catherine II issued her Charter of the Nobility, according to which descendants of Cossack starshyna, who wished to enter into the Russian nobility, had to justify their claims of noble origin. After the establishment of the Imperial Heraldry Office in 1797, applicants would examine numerous treaties between the hetmans and tsars, as well as Polish-Lithuanian charters and other historical documents, using the heritage of the Cossack state in order to prove their noble status. This led to a renewed interest for the past among the Ukrainian public and indirectly contributed to the emergence of a national movement in Dnieper Ukraine.

The image of Cossack Ukraine as a democratic and freedom-loving society as opposed to despotic Muscovy, which became a common trope introduced by popular works such as the History of Ruthenians, led to calls for liberation from the Russian rule and restoration of Ukrainian statehood, and inspired the Ukrainian national revival of the 19th century.

== Map gallery ==
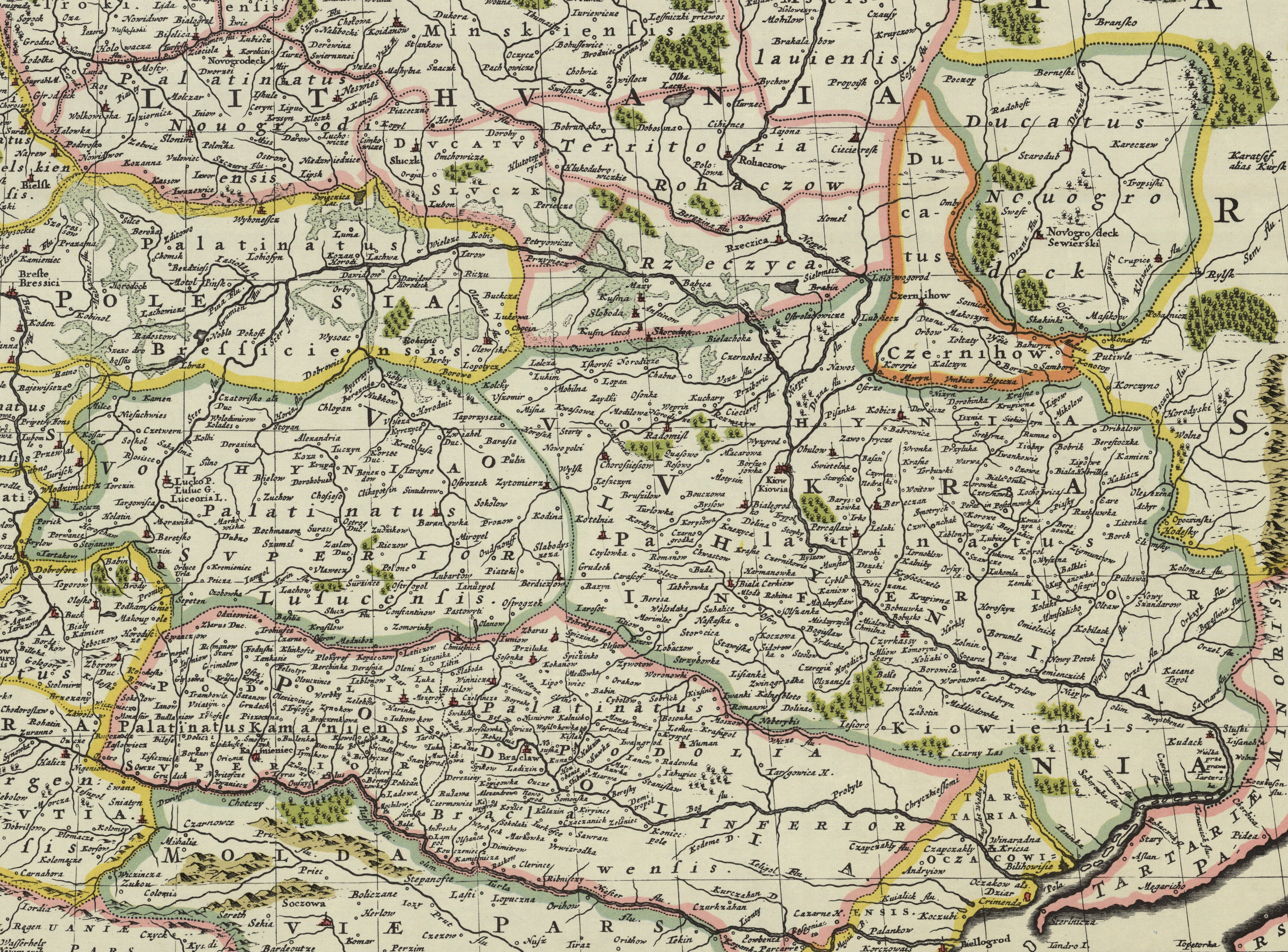
Eastern territories of the Polish–Lithuanian Commonwealth on the map by F. de Wit, issued in Amsterdam in the first half of XVII century.

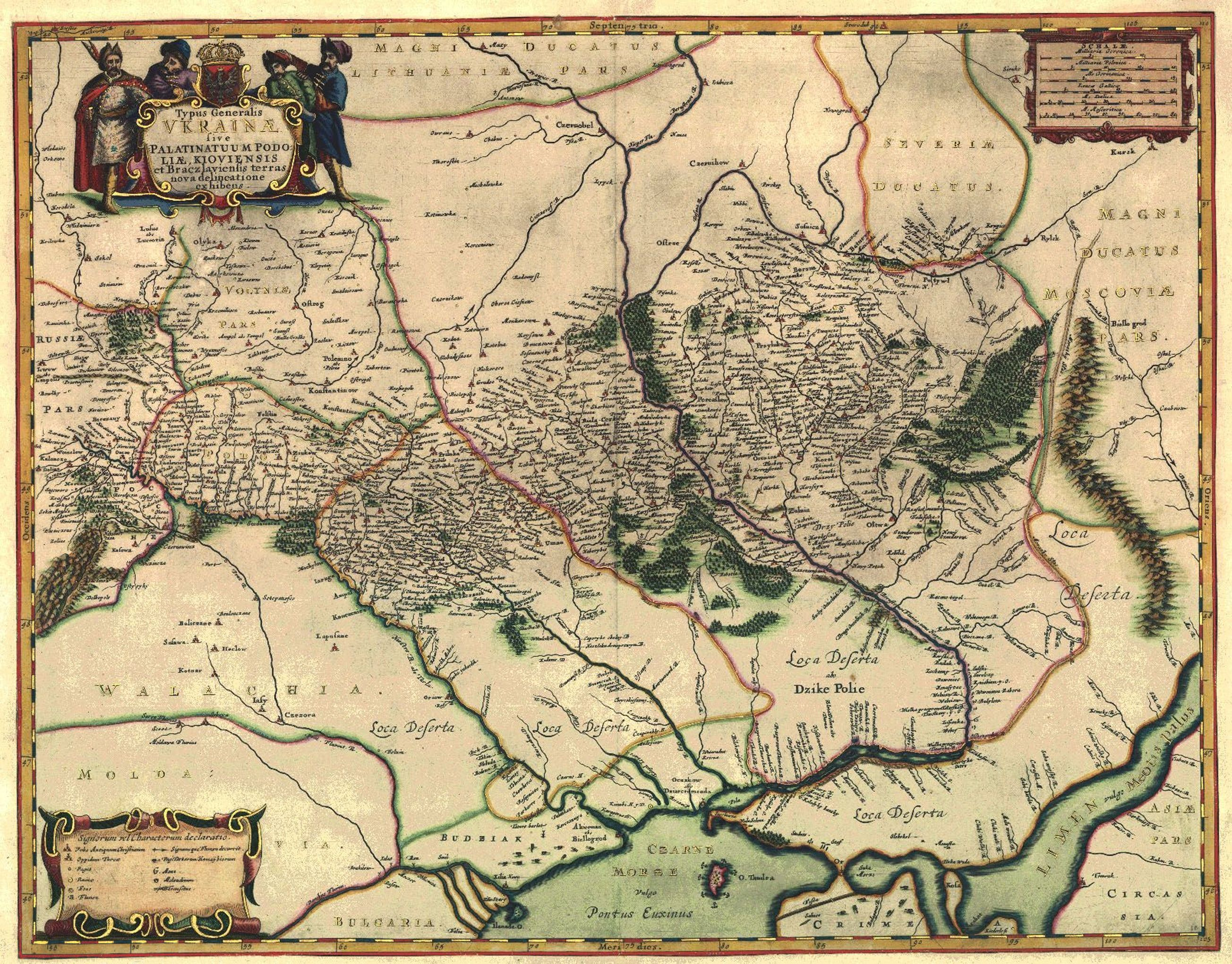
General map of the borders of the new lands of Ukraine in 1649, or Palatinates of Podolia, Kyiv, Bratslav

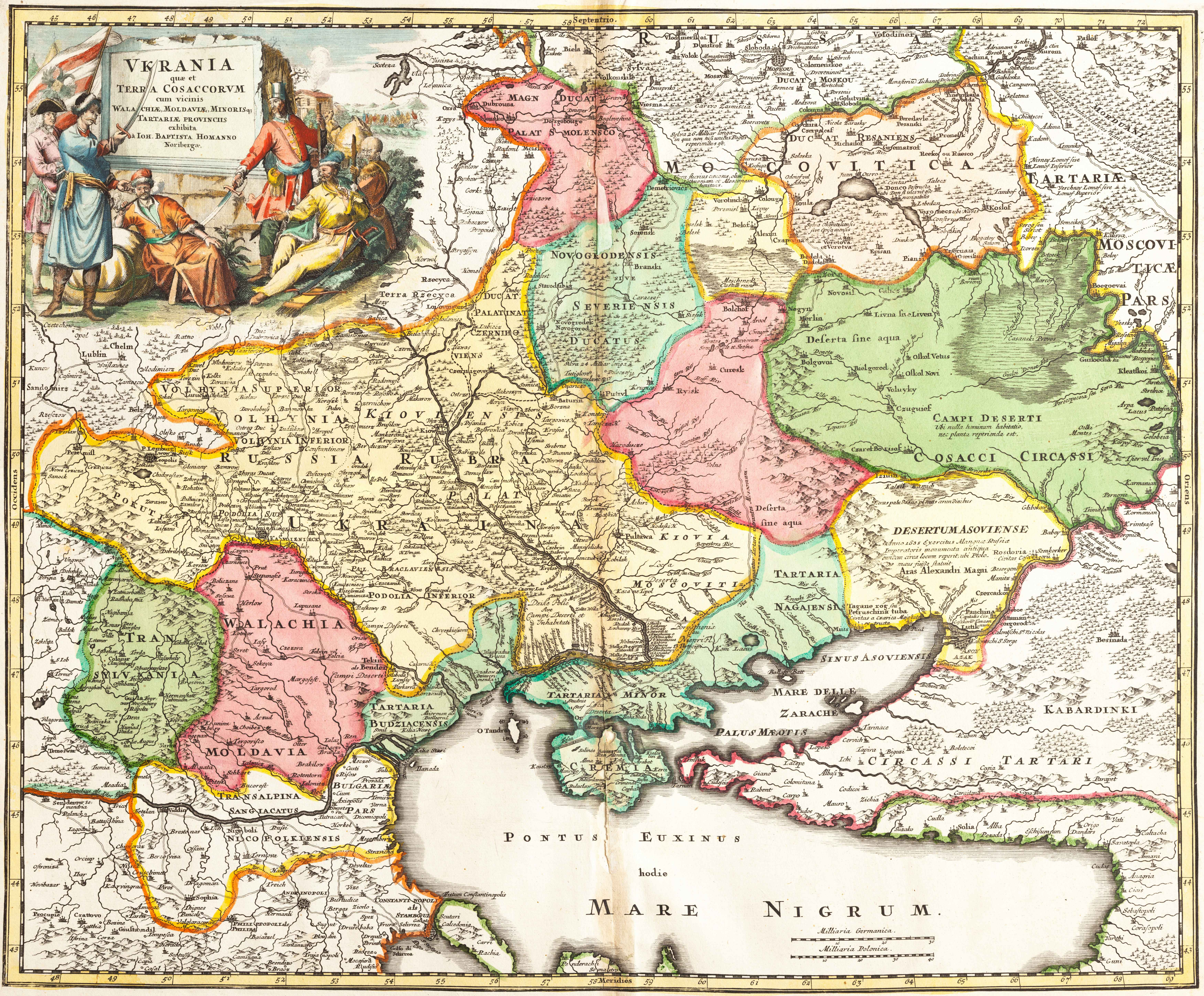
A 1720 map by Johann Baptist Homann: Ukraine, or Cossack Land

== See also ==
- Correspondence between the Ottoman sultan and the Cossacks
  - Reply of the Zaporizhian Cossacks
- King of Ruthenia
- Hetman of the Zaporizhian Cossacks
  - Lists of Zaporizhian Cossack Hetmans
  - Registered Cossacks
- Zaporizhzhia (region)
  - Zaporizhian Sich
- Left-bank Ukraine
- Right-bank Ukraine
- The Ruin (Ukrainian history)
- List of leaders of Ukraine
- With Fire and Sword (film)
- Hetman (2015 movie)
- The Road to Sich (1994 movie)

== Bibliography ==
- Magocsi, Paul Robert (1996). A History of Ukraine. Toronto: University of Toronto Press. ISBN 0-8020-0830-5.
- Magocsi, Paul Robert (2010). "The Cossack State, 1648–1711". History of Ukraine: The Land and Its Peoples (2nd ed.). Toronto: University of Toronto Press. ISBN 978-1442610217. Archived from the original on 2016-03-13.
- Kármán, Gábor; Kunčevic, Lovro, eds. (2013). The European Tributary States of the Ottoman Empire in the Sixteenth and Seventeenth Centuries. Leiden: Brill. ISBN 9789004246065.
- Peredriyenko, V. A. (2001). "Староукраїнська проста мова ХУІ – ХУІІІ ст. в контексті формування національної літературної мови" [The 17th–18th-century Old Ukrainian vernacular in context of national literary language formation]. Актуальні Проблеми Української Лінгвістики: Теорія І Практика (in Ukrainian) (4). Taras Shevchenko National University of Kyiv: 16–23. ISSN 2311-2697.
- Snyder, Timothy D. (2003). The Reconstruction of Nations: Poland, Ukraine, Lithuania, Belarus, 1569–1999. Yale University Press. p. 384. ISBN 978-0-300-10586-5.
