= Hetmanate =

Hetmanate (Ukrainian: Гетьманат or Гетьманщина), a political entity, may refer to:

- Cossack Hetmanate, a Ukrainian Cossack state 1649–1764
- Ukrainian State, sometimes also called the Second Hetmanate, 1918

== See also ==
- Hetman, a political title from Central and Eastern Europe
