= Battle of Skałat =

1657 battle

Battle of Skalat
- Part of The Deluge
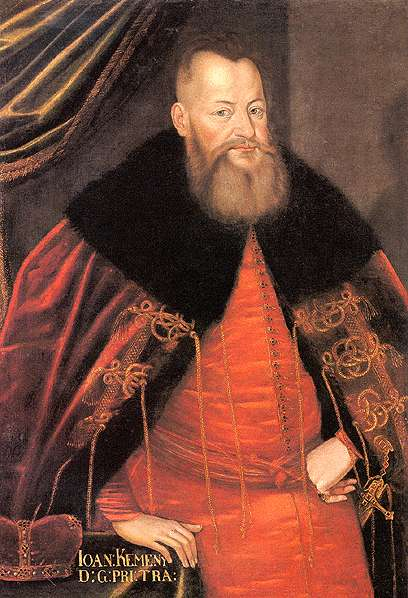
- John Kemény
Date	July 26, 1657
Location	Skalat, Ukraine
Result	Tatar victory

Belligerents
Transylvania	Crimean Khanate

Commanders and leaders
(Transylvania) John Kemény (POW)	Unknown

Casualties and losses
500 dead, 11,000 enslaved	Light

Battle of Skalat was a battle fought between the Tatar and Transylvanian armies as part of the Deluge.

== Prelude ==
In accordance with Treaty of Radnot, in January 1657, the Transylvanian army of 25,000 crossed the Carpathians, joined with Zaporozhian Cossacks and set off towards Kraków, where the situation of the Swedish garrison was desperate. On March 21, Rákóczi captured Tarnów, and on March 28, he reached Kraków. Along the way to the ancient Polish capital, the Transylvanian-Cossack army burned and looted towns and villages, murdering thousands. Since his army was too busy looting Lesser Poland, only 5,000 soldiers reached Kraków, which by the Treaty of Radnot, was to be ruled by Transylvania. On May 13, Rákóczi and Charles X Gustav seized the fortress of Brześć Litewski, and on May 17, after a three-day siege, the Swedes, Cossacks, and Transylvanians captured Warsaw. Soon afterwards, however, the Dano-Swedish War began, and Charles X Gustav left Poland with most of his troops. The ruler of Transylvania began a quick retreat southwards, but on July 11, was defeated in Battle of Magierów, and on July 20, the Transylvanian-Cossack army was completely destroyed in the Battle of Czarny Ostrów. Three days later, Rákóczi signed a peace treaty with the Commonwealth, in which he promised to break the alliance with Sweden, withdraw his troops from Poland, and pay for the damage inflicted by his army.

== Battle ==
On July 26, 1657, at the Skalat, Crimean Tatars, allied with Poland, surrounded retreating remnants of Transilvanian army. The Tatars killed 500 Transilvanians, capturing 11,000.

== Aftermath ==
While Rákóczi himself managed to escape, his entire army of 25,000 was annihilated in less than 5 months, with the survivors enslaved.
