= Battle of Magierów =

1657 battle

- Part of the Deluge, Brest Campaign, Second Northern War and Khmelnytsky Uprising
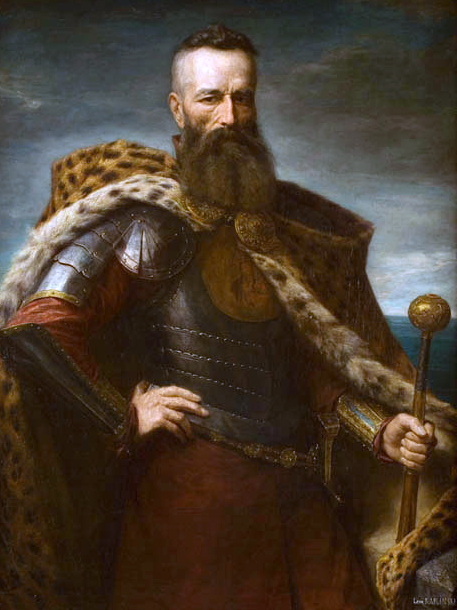
- Matthisen Stefan Czarniecki
Date	11 July 1657
Location	Magierów near Lwów, Kingdom of Poland (now: Ukraine)
Result	Polish-Lithuanian-Tatar victory

Belligerents
Transylvania (Cossack Hetmanate) Zaporozhian Cossacks; Moldavia; Wallachia	Polish–Lithuanian Commonwealth; Crimean Khanate

Commanders and leaders
(Transylvania) George II Rakoczi (Cossack Hetmanate) Anton Zhdanovych	(Polish–Lithuanian Commonwealth) Stefan Czarniecki

Strength
Unknown	10,000

Casualties and losses
Unknown	Unknown

The Battle of Magierów took place on 11 July 1657, during Polish history known as the Swedish Deluge. Polish army commanded by Stefan Czarniecki, and supported by Crimean Tatars, defeated a Transilvanian-Cossack-Moldavian-Wallachian army of George II Rákóczi.

== Background ==
In late January 1657, following the Treaty of Radnot, southern provinces of the Polish–Lithuanian Commonwealth were invaded by the Principality of Transylvania, whose army was commanded by George II Rákóczi. In mid-February near Medyka, the 25,000 Transilvanians joined 10,000 Zaporozhian Cossacks under Anton Zdanowicz. By March 1657, Rakoczi reached Swedish-occupied Kraków. In April, he met Swedish King Charles X Gustav. In May, he captured the city of Brest. By late June, he was in Warsaw. Rakoczi’s campaign was marked by widespread looting, murder, and destruction.

In June 1657, the Dano-Swedish War (1657–58) broke out, which forced Charles Gustav to move most of his army to Denmark. Under the circumstances, the Rakoczi decided to march southwards and leave the Commonwealth as soon as possible. Polish King John II Casimir of the Royal Vasa Dynasty was well aware of it and decided to prevent the Transylvanians, Moldavians, Wallachians, and Cossacks from escaping Poland. King John II Casimir called Stefan Czarniecki to come with his division to Częstochowa where Austrian cavalry mercenaries, Lithuanians of Aleksander Hilary Polubiński, and a unit of Crimean Tatars joined him. On 7 July, Czarniecki’s division reached Łańcut, where a council of Polish hetmans took place. Czarniecki followed Rakoczi, while Jerzy Sebastian Lubomirski and Stanisław "Rewera" Potocki sealed the Polish-Transylvanian border.

== Battle ==
After the meeting, Czarniecki, with an army of 10,000. followed Rakoczi, attacking his troops in a guerrilla-style war, typical of the Polish hetman. On 11 July, Czarniecki attacked the Transylvanians, near the village of Magierów, north of Lwów. After a Polish attack, the Transilvanians retreated towards Żółkiew, leaving behind some 2,000 wagons with goods looted in Poland. Soon afterward, Poles ambushed the enemy in the swampy waterbed of the Poltva River. Hundreds of Hungarians drowned, and the survivors continued their retreat southwards.

== Aftermath ==
The next day, Czarniecki's troops caught up with the enemy while crossing the marshy backwaters of the Pełtwia, driving a significant part of Rákóczi's forces into the swamps. As a result of this action, many Hungarians drowned. Soon, Czarniecki and his hetmans forced Rákóczi to capitulate at Czarny Ostrów.

== Sources ==
- Nagielski, Miroslaw (1990). Historyczne bitwy: Warszawa 1656 (in Polish). Bellona. ISBN 83-11-07786-X.
- Podhorodecki, Leszek (1985). Rapier i koncerz: Z dziejów wojen polsko-szwedzkich (in Polish). Ksiazka i Wiedza. ISBN 9788305114523.
