= Battle of Czarny Ostrów =

1657 battle

- Part of the Deluge, Brest Campaign, Second Northern War and Khmelnytsky Uprising
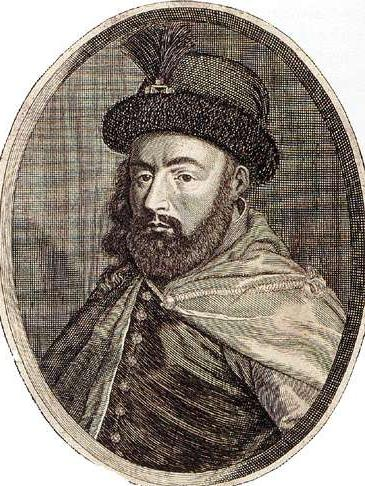
- George II Rákóczi- Transylvanian prince who, after several months of fighting in Poland lost his entire army.
Date	20 July 1657
Location	Zasadki near Czarny Ostrow in Podolia, Polish–Lithuanian Commonwealth
Result	Polish-Lithuanian-Tatar victory

Belligerents
Transylvania; Cossack Hetmanate; Moldavia; Wallachia	Polish–Lithuanian Commonwealth; Crimean Khanate

Commanders and leaders
(Transylvania) George II Rakoczi (surrendered) (Cossack Hetmanate) Anton Zhdanovych	(Polish–Lithuanian Commonwealth) Stefan Czarniecki (Polish–Lithuanian Commonwealth) Jerzy Lubomirski (Polish–Lithuanian Commonwealth) Stanislaw Potocki

Strength
42,000	28,000

Casualties and losses
Heavy	Unknown

The Battle of Czarny Ostrów or Chornyi Ostriv took place on 20 July 1657 Transylvanian campaign into Poland (1657), during the period in Polish historiography known as the Deluge. The Polish Crown army commanded by Hetmans Stefan Czarniecki, Jerzy Lubomirski and Stanisław Potocki, supported by Crimean Tatars, defeated a Transylvanian-Cossack-Moldavian-Wallachian army under George II Rakoczi.

== Background ==
In early 1657, following the Treaty of Radnot, southern Poland was invaded by Transylvanian army of George II Rakoczi. Since the main Polish forces of the Polish–Lithuanian Commonwealth were engaged in fighting the Swedish Empire, only a division of Stanisław Potocki was sent southwards. Meanwhile, Rakoczi's army headed towards Kraków, and its march was marked by widespread looting and destruction.

In May 1657, during a meeting in Sokal, Polish leaders decided to carry out a revenge attack on the Principality of Transylvania. In June of the same year, Swedish forces abandoned Rakoczi, and headed to Denmark, due to the outbreak of the Dano-Swedish War.

Meanwhile, Hetman Lubomirski with 4,000 soldiers concentrated his forces in Sambor, and, together with thousands of peasants, invaded Transylvania. Lubomirski stayed in Transylvania until July, when he returned, and joined forces with the division under Potocki. This took place near Stryj.

On July 11, Stefan Czarniecki defeated the Transylvanian-Cossack-Moldavian-Wallachian army of Rakoczi in the Battle of Magierów. On July 16, Czarniecki's division joined the forces of Lubomirski and Potocki, and the hetmans decided to destroy Rakoczi. Meanwhile, the Cossacks of Anton Zdanowicz abandoned the Transylvanians, and their situation became desperate. Under these circumstances, Rakoczi sent envoys to the Poles, asking for a peace treaty. Lubomirski and Potocki were willing to sign a treaty, while Czarniecki and his soldiers wanted to fight, hoping for rich booty.

== Battle ==
Rakoczy, in a desperate situation, sent an envoy to the Polish commanders, who asked for peace terms. The talks ended with Czarniecki's demand that Rakoczy surrender completely. The hetmans were more inclined to an agreement, but Czarniecki and his soldiers were aiming for a decisive battle, counting on the destruction of the enemy and considerable spoils.

On July 20, near Czarny Ostrów, the Polish advance guard defeated the Transylvanian guard and tore off part of the tabor. Rakoczy decided to abandon the tabor and on July 21, he set off for Międzybórz, where he began negotiations. Czarniecki opposed them, trying to send his division into battle, which Potocki firmly opposed. As a result, on July 23, 1657, a peace agreement was concluded.

== Aftermath ==
A treaty was signed by both sides. Rakoczi was obliged to break the alliance with the Swedish Empire, pull his garrisons out of the occupied cities of Kraków and Brest, and pay 1.2 million Polish złotys to the Polish-Lithuanian Treasury. Furthermore, he was obliged to pay 1 million złotys to the Polish hetmans, and 2 million to the Polish soldiers.

The treaty did not prevent Rakoczi's army from total annihilation. Three days later the Transylvanians were attacked by Crimean Tatars, who at that time were allied with Poland. The Tatars disregarded the treaty, and on July 31, they entered Rakoczi's camp, located in Trembowla. Some 11,000 soldiers were captured, including high-ranking officers, such as Janos Kemeny. Rakoczi himself managed to escape the trap, and returned to Transylvania with a handful of men.

== Sources ==
- Miroslaw Nagielski, Warszawa 1656, Wydawnictwo Bellona, Warszawa 1990, ISBN 83-11-07786-X
- Leszek Podhorodecki, Rapier i koncerz, Warszawa 1985, ISBN 83-05-11452-X
