= Transylvanian campaign into Poland (1657) =

Military campaign into the Polish–Lithuanian Commonwealth in 1657

- Part of the Deluge
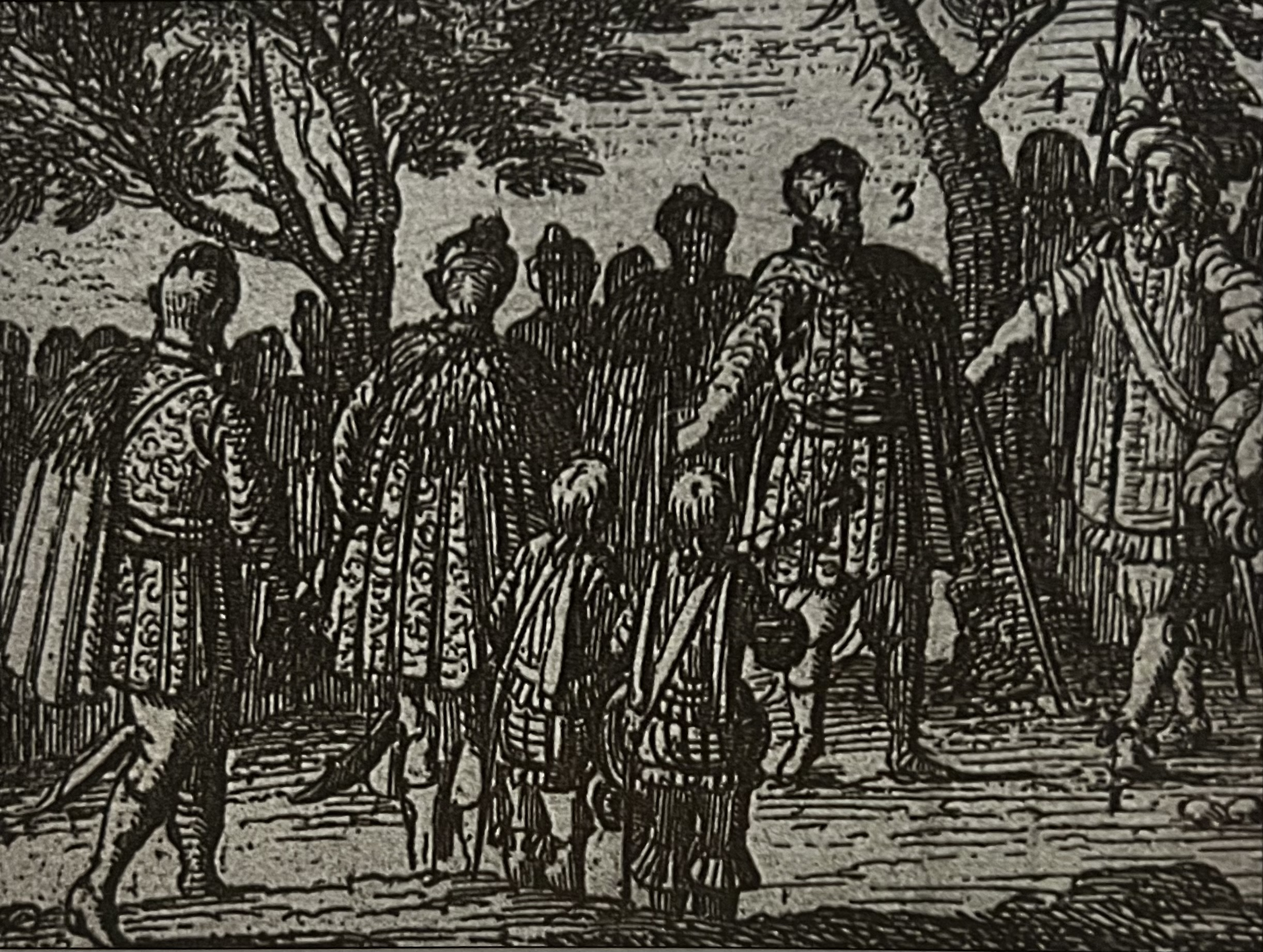
- Transylvanians discussing strategy with King Charles X of Sweden in 1657
Date	March – July 1657
Location	Poland
Result	Disputed (See § Result)

Belligerents
Polish–Lithuanian Commonwealth; Crimean Khanate	Transylvania; Swedish Empire; Cossack Hetmanate

Commanders and leaders
(Polish–Lithuanian Commonwealth) Jerzy Lubomirski (Polish–Lithuanian Commonwealth) Paweł Sapieha (Polish–Lithuanian Commonwealth) Stanislaw Potocki (Polish–Lithuanian Commonwealth) Melchior Sawicki (Polish–Lithuanian Commonwealth) Eliasz Jan Łącki (Polish–Lithuanian Commonwealth) Stefan Czarniecki	(Transylvania) George II Rákóczi (surrendered) (Transylvania) John Kemény (POW) (Transylvania) Péter Huszár (POW) (Transylvania) Ferenc Ispán (POW) (Transylvania) András Gaudi (surrendered) (Swedish Empire) Charles X Gustav (Swedish Empire) Erik Dahlbergh (Swedish Empire) Adolf Johan av Pfalz (Swedish Empire) Jerzy Niemirycz (Swedish Empire) Johan Benedikt von Schönleben (Swedish Empire) Jacob Kasimir De la Gardie (Swedish Empire) Georg von Waldeck (Swedish Empire) Paul Würtz (Cossack Hetmanate) Anton Zhdanovych (Cossack Hetmanate) Ivan Bohun

Units involved
(Polish–Lithuanian Commonwealth) Brest garrison (Polish–Lithuanian Commonwealth) Warsaw garrison	(Swedish Empire) Swedish Life Guard of Horse

Strength
(Polish–Lithuanian Commonwealth) 12,000 men	24,000–30,000 men 30 cannons (Swedish Empire) 10,000 men (Cossack Hetmanate) 6,000 men (Note: Some estimates put the number as high as 35,000, but this number is most likely not the true number) Total; 40,000–46,000 men / 70,000 men

Casualties and losses
Unknown	(Swedish Empire) (Cossack Hetmanate) Light; Very heavy

The Transylvanian campaign into Poland (Note: Swedish: Transsylvaniens kampanj in i Polen. Ukrainian: Похід корпусу Антона Ждановича, romanized: Pokhid korpusu Antona Zhdanovycha, lit. 'March of Anton Zhdanovych's Corps',) also called the Brest Campaign or Rakoczy's Campaign (Note: Polish: Najazd Rakoczego.) was a campaign by Transylvania, Sweden, and the Cossack Hetmanate into the Polish–Lithuanian Commonwealth during the Deluge in 1657. The allied army saw success in the beginning, but when Denmark declared war on Sweden, Charles abandoned the Transylvanians, which led to their defeat. During the campaign, the allied forces successfully managed to capture both Warsaw and Brest from the Poles but were later pushed out from the country after the forces of Stefan Czarniecki intervened in the conflict.

== Background ==
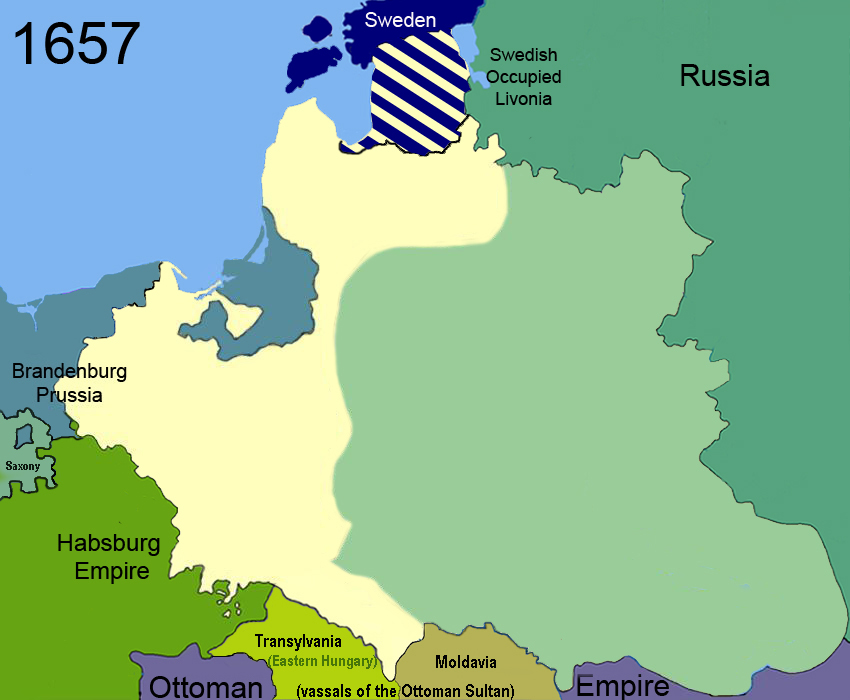
The Polish–Lithuanian Commonwealth in 1657

In March 1657, Charles X Gustav of Sweden commenced a new offensive into the south of Poland. Although there are some disputes over the size of his force, it was not large and likely consisted of around 4,000 Swedes and 3,000 Brandenburgers divided into four regiments under Georg von Waldeck totaling to around 7,000 men. Charles had ordered his field artillery and musketeers to be on horeback so they would be able to keep up with the Swedish cavalry.

During this campaign, however, Charles had gained two new allies, being Prince George Rákóczi of Transylvania and Bohdan Khmelnytsky of the Cossack Hetmanate. The latter having in February sent Colonel Anton Zhdanovych of Kiev with three Cossack regiments to link up with the Transylvanian Prince and the Swedish king. Khmelnytsky had planned to fight in the campaign himself, but an illness prevented this.

Rákóczi marched north into the Commonwealth with a large army split into three divisions under respectively John Kemény, Péter Huszár, and Ferenc Ispán. Rákóczi was quickly joined by a Cossack contingent under the command of Anton Zhdanovych.

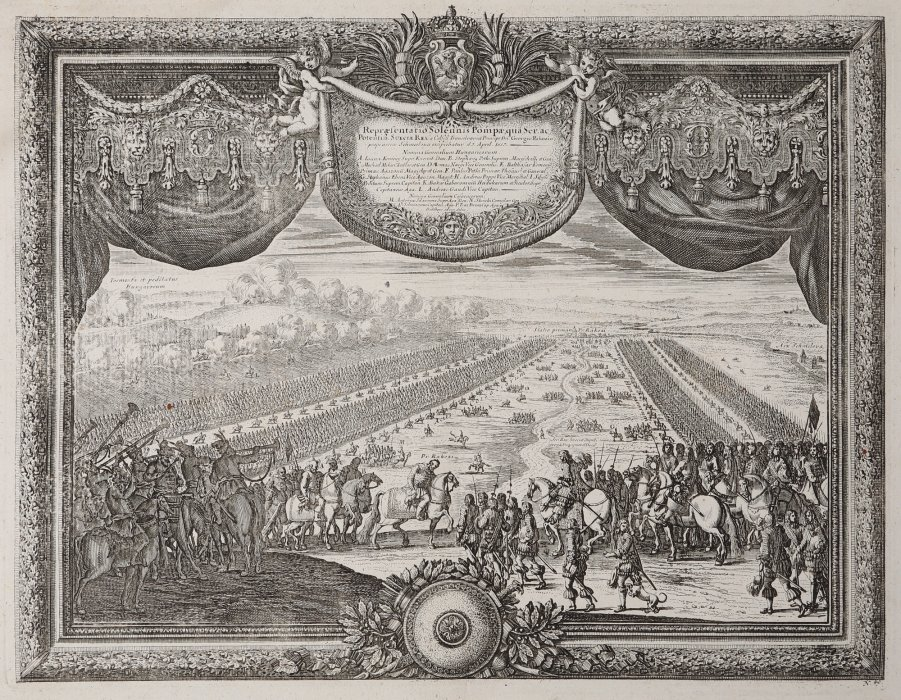
The armies of Prince George II Rákóczi and Charles X Gustav meeting in 1657

=== Estimates of Transylvanian and Cossack forces ===
Both contemporary and modern historians disagree with exactly how many men Rákóczi brought with him for the campaign. Patrick Gordon, who was a contemporary writer, claims that his army consisted of 20,000 Transylvanians, 5,000 Wallachians, 5,000 Moldavians, 6,000 Cossacks, and 30 cannons, along with a supply train of around 1,000 wagons. Due to the Cossacks being allied with the Transylvanians, the total strength of the Transylvanian army, using this claim, comes out to 30,000.

Other sources, including Erik Dahlbergh's writings, claim that the total strength of the Transylvanian army was 24,000. He also mentioned a Cossack force of 2,000, but it is unlikely that this number refers to the entire Cossack army since it is this number that accompanied Rákóczi to a meeting with Charles Gustav. Dahlbergh also claims that the Cossack army consisted of upwards of 35,000 men, but this number may very likely refer to the total number of fighting men in the Hetmanate.

The figure of 6,000 Cossacks claimed by Gordon corresponds to the three regiments which Zhdanovych brought from Kiev. It is then likely that the 2,000 Cossacks mentioned by Dahlbergh was one of Zhdanovych's regiments.

=== Swedish command ===
The command of the Swedish troops was divided into 2 groups. The Swedish king himself took personal and overall command of the 7,000 strong army, while the Generals Adolf Johan av Pfalz, Jerzy Niemirycz, and Johan Benedikt von Schönleben led the 4,000 Swedish troops.

== Campaign ==
In the beginning of the campaign during new years, Rákóczi wanted to besiege Lviv, but he lacked both the necessary equipment and experience for extensive siege operations, which would be needed for a siege of the city. When Rákóczi received a signal for help from Paul Würtz in Krakow, which had already been besieged by Lubormirski for five months, he decided to march towards the city instead. Not wishing to engage in a battle with the Transylvanians, Lubomirski lifted his siege and retreated towards the north-east, after this, Rákóczi relieved the Swedish garrison. following along the Vistula river. Rákóczi followed the Polish army, until he linked up with the Swedish army in the area around Sandomierz on 11 April.

After taking control over central Poland, the allied armies marched against Lithuania. King Charles chose Węgrów, which was also a Protestant centre in Poland, as his headquarters. When the allies arrived there, they were met with reinforcements from the Swedish army led by General Jacob Kasimir De la Gardie and a German force of 3,000 led by Georg von Waldeck. While in the city, the allies received news of a forced crossing of the Bug River by the Commonwealth troops and their advance towards Brest. After deliberating, the allied commanders decided to give chase. Their plan was to annihilate the 12,000 strong Polish army led by the Hetmans Sapieha and Stanislaw Potocki.

The combat skills of the Transylvanian army was "less than desired". Moreover, their movement was slowed by their large supply train and poor ability to build bridges. When the two armies had to cross the Vistula in the middle of April, the Swedes were forced to build a pontoon bridge for the Transylvanians, since their own attempt had ended in the bridge collapsing. During the construction of the pontoon bridge, multiple Polish snipers harassed the Swedes. At one point, when King Charles, who had disregarded the warnings regarding the snipers, moved closer to the proceedings, a Pole in Swedish service shouted to the snipers that the King of Sweden had arrived, and requested them not to harm him. He also indicated that Charles was there with his hand. On the opposite side of the river, the Polish officers quickly ordered their men to cease their fire, greeted the Swedish king with all honours expected by a royal visitor, and promptly retreated.

When the bridge had been finished, it still took the Transylvanian army three days to completely cross the river. King Charles sent Dahlbergh ahead of the two armies for reconnaissance, since one of Dahlberghs tasks was to carry out intelligence gathering. Dahlbergh commanded a joint cavalry force, which consisted of 120 men taken from the Swedish Life Guard of Horse, who were also known as "blackcoats", along with 100 Swedish cavalry, 200 Transylvanians under the command of Ferenc Ispán, and 200 Cossacks. Because of the slowness of the Transylvanians, the Polish troops easily avoided combat. Due to this, there was little that Charles and Rákóczi could do except following the fast-moving Poles.

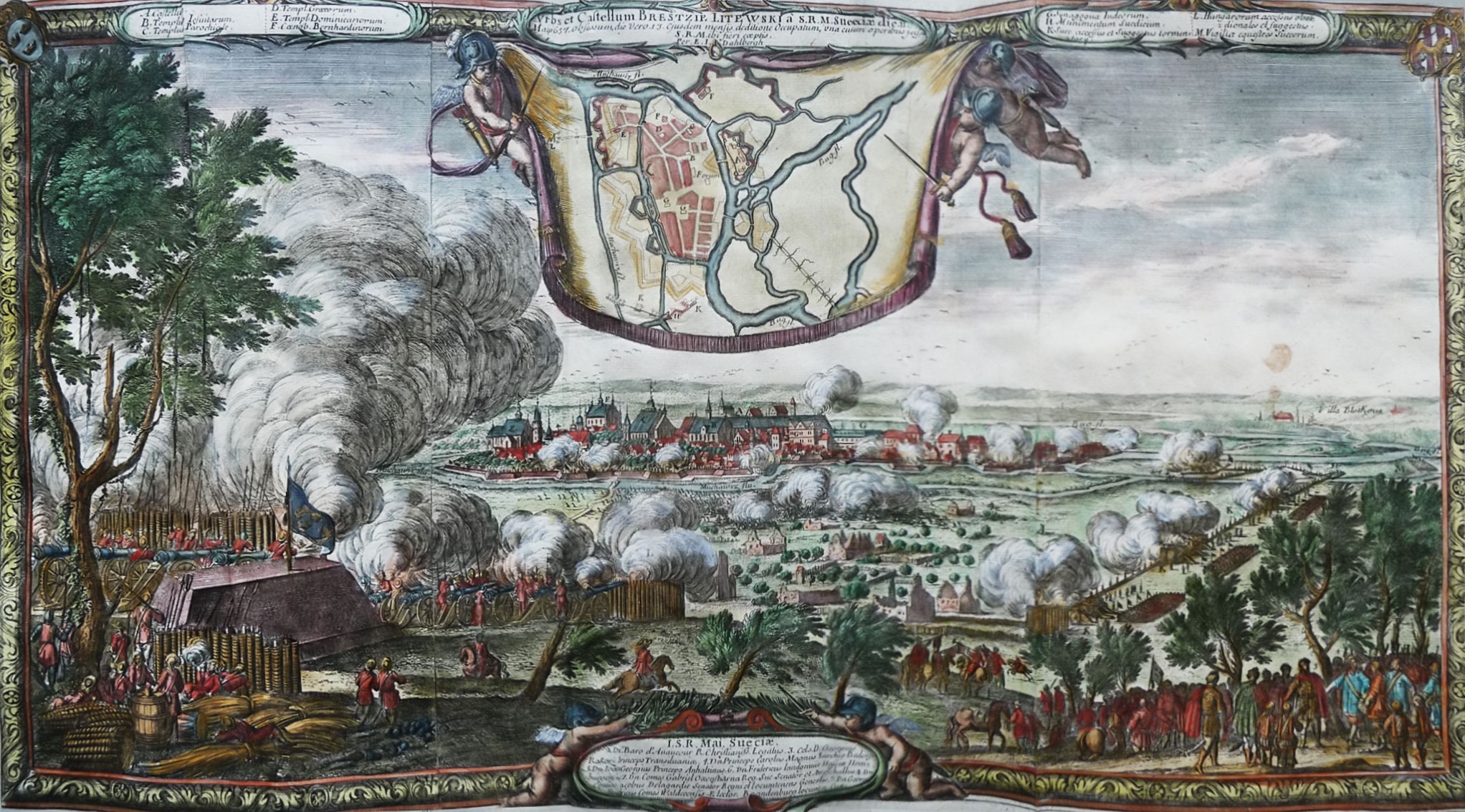
Siege of Brest in 1657

=== Siege of Brest ===
On 16 May, after a bombardment of the city, the allies captured Brest, despite its strong and modern fortification and 2,000 strong garrison under Castellan Melchior Sawicki. Despite being offered free departure from the city, a large part of the garrison, being around 600 men, instead decided to enlist in the Swedish army. The success of the allied siege was mostly because of Dahlberghs efforts, who had entered Brest in the disguise of a junior member of a negotiation team and managed to assess the fortifications. Even so, Brest surrendered without combat, and in accordance with the Treaty of Radnot, King Charles gave Brest to Rákóczi, who would appoint Colonel András Gaudi as the commander of the city.

=== Capture of Warsaw ===
The two also captured Warsaw on June 17, but still failed to force the Poles into open battle.

Considering the low combat efficiency of the Transylvanians, King Charles came to the same conclusion that the Swedes had come to during the Thirty Years' War, which was that while some Transylvanian units could be dependable, most of them were irregular light cavalry or light infantry, with some only serving for plunder and not pay. Rákóczi could not be fully trusted either, as he refused to sign the treaties in which he and Charles had agreed to, and he carried out negotiations which he believed to be secret with Polish commanders, but this was exposed to the Swedes through their extensive intelligence network.

=== Swedish departure ===
In 1657, in the midst of the campaign, Denmark declared war on Sweden, forcing Charles to abandon the campaign and see to his possessions in the north, both in Prussia and the Swedish core territories which were under threat by Denmark. In June, the Swedish and Transylvanian armies parted ways. Although the campaign had not lived up to expectations, the alliance between the two persisted, and for a short while played a part in the defence of Krakow. Rákóczi could do little on his own, and despite him accepting Charles' advice to abandon the campaign and return home, the Transylvanian army did not manage to survive July. Harassed by both Polish and Tatar troops, he was defeated at Magierów and then once more at Czarny Ostrów. John Kemény, one of Rákóczi's commanders, was defeated and captured during the Battle of Skałat. While Rákóczi himself managed to escape, his entire army of 25,000 was annihilated in less than 5 months, with the survivors enslaved by the Tatars of the Crimean Khanate and taken to Crimea.

== Aftermath ==
After Rákóczi had been defeated, he formally withdrew from the Commonwealth and renounced all of his claims on the Polish throne.

=== Result ===
The exact result of the campaign is disputed among historians, with some stating that the joint campaign had "not lived up to expectations", while others state that the Swedes and Transylvanians had "triumphed".

== Bibliography ==
- Essen, Michael (2022). Charles X's Wars Vol.2: The Wars in the East, 1655-1657. Helion & Company. ISBN 9781915070302.
- Kotljarchuk, Andrej (2006). In the Shadows of Poland and Russia : The Grand Duchy of Lithuania and Sweden in the European Crisis of the mid-17th Century (PDF). Södertörn University. ISBN 9789189315631.
- Markowicz, Marcin (2011). Najazd Rakoczego na Polskę, 1657 (in Polish). Zabrze: Wydawn. inforteditions. p. 176. ISBN 978-83-89943-75-0.
- Sundberg, Ulf (1998). Svenska krig 1521-1814 [Swedish wars 1521-1814] (in Swedish). Hjalmarson & Högberg. ISBN 9789189660106.
