= Khmelnytsky Uprising =

Cossack rebellion within the Polish–Lithuanian Commonwealth in 1648–1657

- Part of the Cossack Uprisings and Deluge
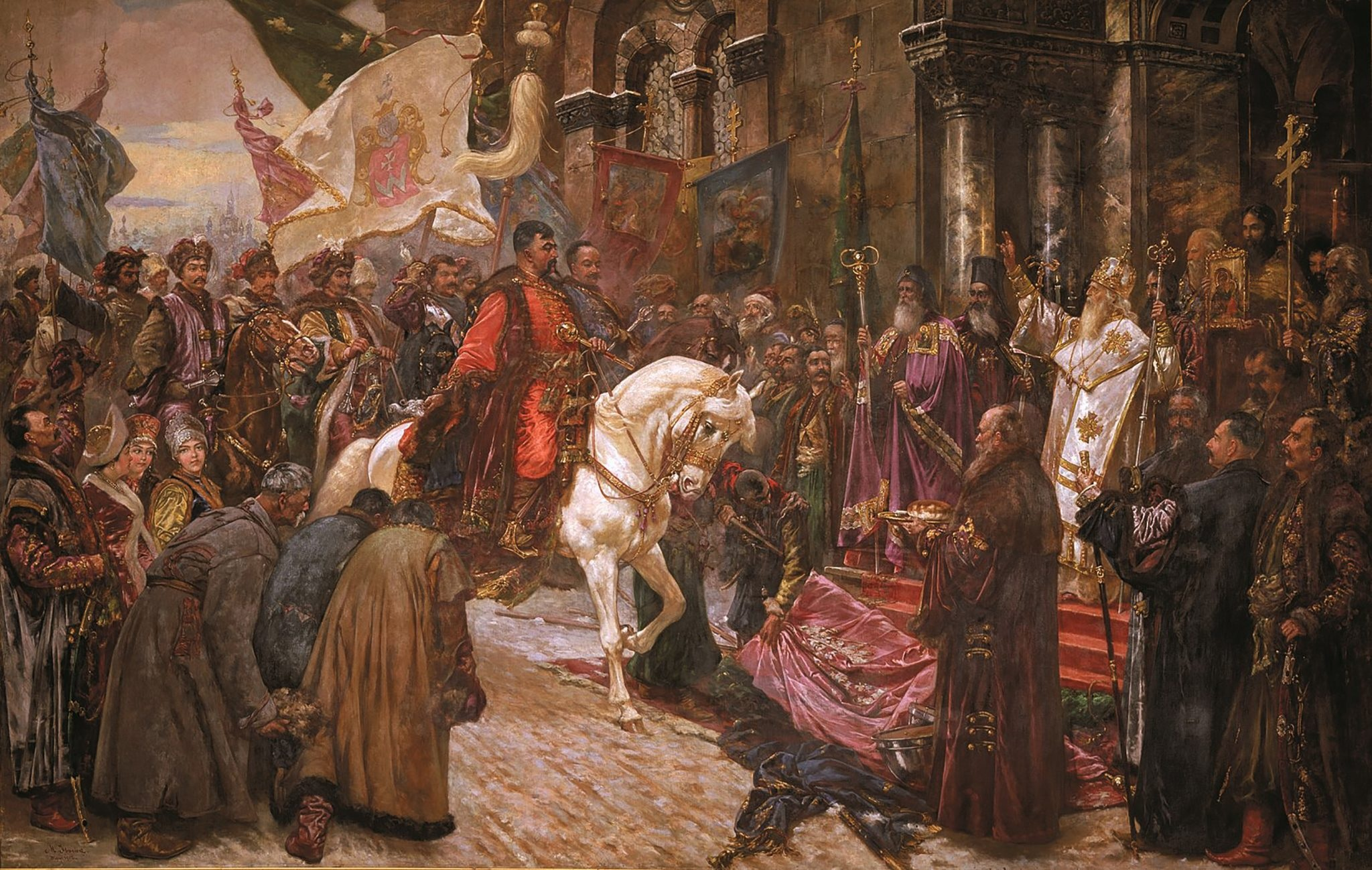
- Entrance of Bohdan Khmelnytskyi to Kyiv in 1649 by 19th-century Ukrainian painter Mykola Ivasyuk
| Date | 25 January 1648 – 6 August 1657... list of phases: First phase: 25 January 1648 – November 1648; Second phase: April 1649 – 15 August 1649; Third phase: August 1650 – 28 September 1651; Fourth phase: c. May 1652 – 16 December 1653; Pereaslav phase: 18 January 1654 – 3 November 1656; Radnot phase: 6 December 1656 – 6 August 1657 |
| Location | Eastern parts of Polish–Lithuanian Commonwealth (mostly in the modern-day territory of Ukraine and southern parts of Belarus) |
| Result | Cossack victory (See § Aftermath) |
| Territorial changes | Emergence of the Cossack Hetmanate: Beginning of the decline of the Polish–Lithuanian Commonwealth; Transformation of the Orthodox population of Ukraine into a distinct polity; Military intervention of the Tsardom of Russia in Cossack Hetmanate |

Belligerents
| 1648–1649 Zaporozhian Cossacks; Crimean Khanate; Peasant rebels | 1648–1649 Poland–Lithuania |
| 1650–1651: Cossack Hetmanate; Crimean Khanate; Moldavia; Lemko and goral rebels | 1650–1651: Poland–Lithuania; Moldavia (initially) |
| 1652–1653: Cossack Hetmanate; Crimean Khanate; Moldavia (Lupu faction); Wallachia | 1652–1653: Poland–Lithuania; Moldavia (Ștefan faction); Wallachia; Transylvania |
| 1654–1655: Cossack Hetmanate; Tsardom of Russia; (yes) Sweden; Margraviate of Brandenburg | 1654–1655: Poland–Lithuania; Crimean Khanate |
| 1656–1657: Cossack Hetmanate; Transylvania; (yes) Sweden; Moldavia | 1656–1657: Poland–Lithuania; Crimean Khanate; Holy Roman Empire; Denmark–Norway; Tsardom of Russia; (indirectly) |

Commanders and leaders
| Bohdan Khmelnytsky # Tymofiy Khmelnytsky †; Hryhoriy Hulyanytsky; Ivan Bohun (WIA); Maksym Kryvonis # Ivan Sirko; Martyn Pushkar; Filon Dzhelaliy; Vasyl Zolotarenko; Ivan Zolotarenko (DOW); Anton Zhdanovych; Matvei Sikorski; Stepan Pobodailo †; Mykhailo Krychevsky (DOW); Danylo Nechai †; İslâm III Giray; Tugay Bey †; Aleksander Kostka Napierski (executed); Vasile Lupu; Alexei I Yakov Cherkassky; Gheorghe Ștefan (after Radnot); George II Rákóczi (after Radnot) (Swedish Empire) Charles X Gustav | Władysław IV Vasa # John II Casimir; Jeremi Wiśniowiecki # Marcin Kalinowski †; Mikołaj Potocki # Stefan Potocki # Zygmunt Przyjemski (executed); Marek Sobieski (executed); Stanisław Potocki; Stanisław Lanckoroński; Stefan Czarniecki; Andrzej Potocki; Piotr Potocki; Stefan Lew †; Matei Basarab; Gheorghe Ștefan (till Radnot); George II Rákóczi (till Radnot); Mehmed IV Giray |

Strength
| 1648: 100,000; 1649: 120,000–150,000; 1651: 100,000–200,000 | 1648: 100,000; 1649: 10,000–15,000; 1651: 106,000–126,000 (Note: 40,000 regular Polish troops, 60,000–80,000 pospolite ruszenie, 6,000 Lithuanian troops (see Capture of Kyiv (1651))) |

Casualties and losses
- See § Casualties

The Khmelnytsky Uprising, (Note: In Ukraine known as Khmelʹnychchyna (Ukrainian: Хмельниччина) or повстання Богдана Хмельницького; Polish: powstanie Chmielnickiego; Lithuanian: Chmelnickio sukilimas; Belarusian: Паўстанне Багдана Хмяльніцкага; Russian: восстание Богдана Хмельницкого) also known as the Cossack–Polish War, Khmelnytsky insurrection, Cossack Revolution, or, in Ukraine, as the National Liberation War, was a successful Cossack rebellion with elements of a religious war that took place between 1648 and 1657 in the eastern territories of the Polish–Lithuanian Commonwealth. Originating in Dnieper Ukraine, the uprising resulted in a Cossack victory and led to the creation of the Cossack Hetmanate. Under the command of Cossack Hetman Bohdan Khmelnytsky, the Zaporozhian Cossacks, supported by the rebelling Ruthenian peasantry and initially allied with the Crimean Khanate, fought against the Commonwealth's forces. The war was accompanied by mass atrocities committed by Cossacks against prisoners of war and the civilian population, especially Poles, Jews, Roman Catholic and Ruthenian Uniate clergy, as well as reprisals by the Polish szlachta and army, especially Jeremi Wiśniowiecki's troops.

The uprising has a symbolic meaning in the history of Ukraine's relationship with Poland and Russia. The uprising led to the eventual incorporation of eastern Ukraine into the Tsardom of Russia, initiated by the 1654 Pereiaslav Agreement. The event triggered a period of political turbulence and infighting in the Hetmanate known as the Ruin. The success of the anti-Polish rebellion, along with internal conflicts in Poland and concurrent invasions waged by Russia and Sweden, ended the Polish Golden Age and caused a secular decline of Polish power during the period known as "the Deluge".

In Jewish history, the Uprising is known for the atrocities against the Jews who, in their capacity as leaseholders (arendators), were seen by the peasants as their immediate oppressors and became the subject of antisemitic violence. Many Jews consider this event "the biggest national catastrophe since the destruction of Solomon's Temple." The Cossack violence during the uprising inflicted damage on the Commonwealth's Jewish communities.

== Background ==
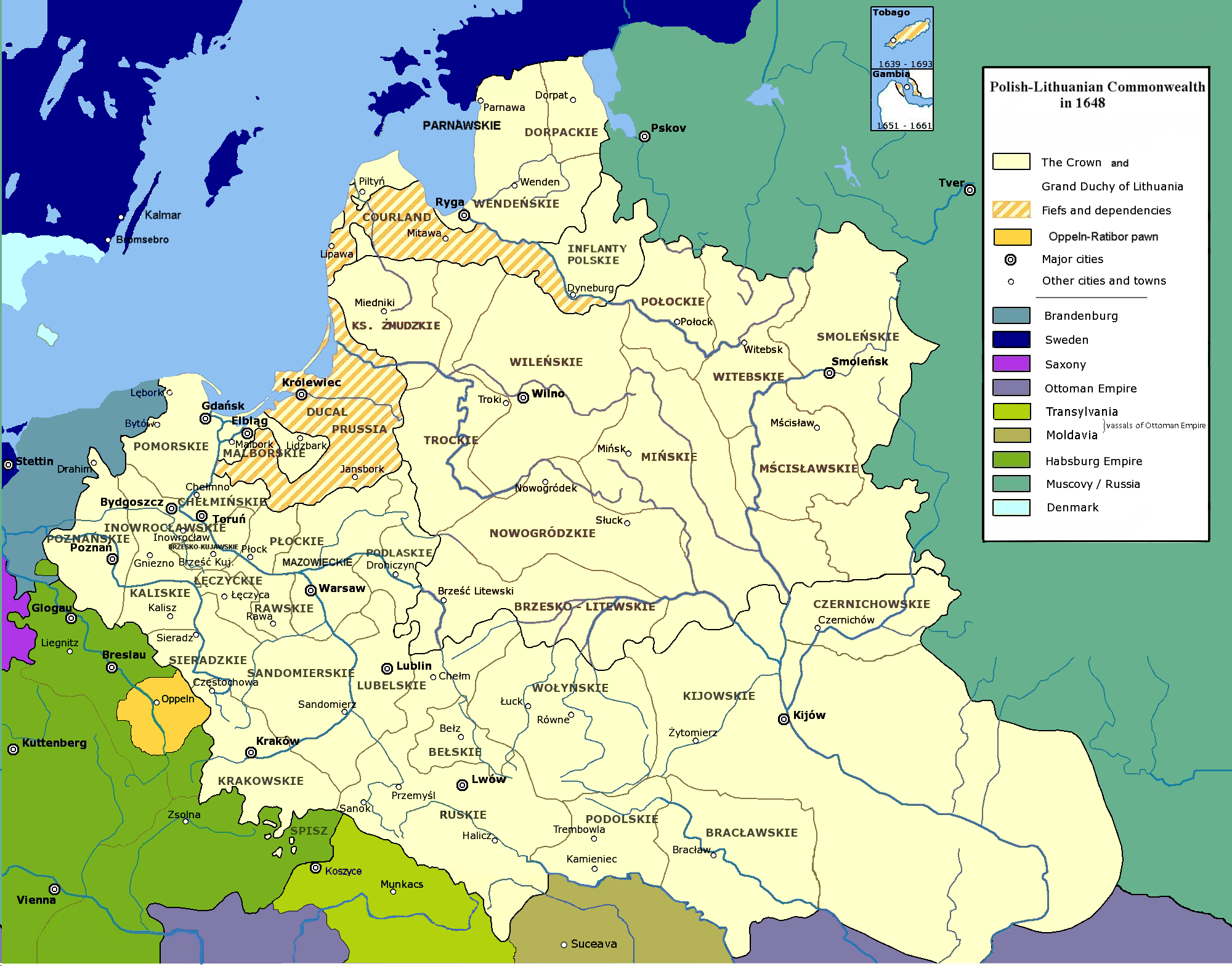
Polish–Lithuanian Commonwealth in 1648

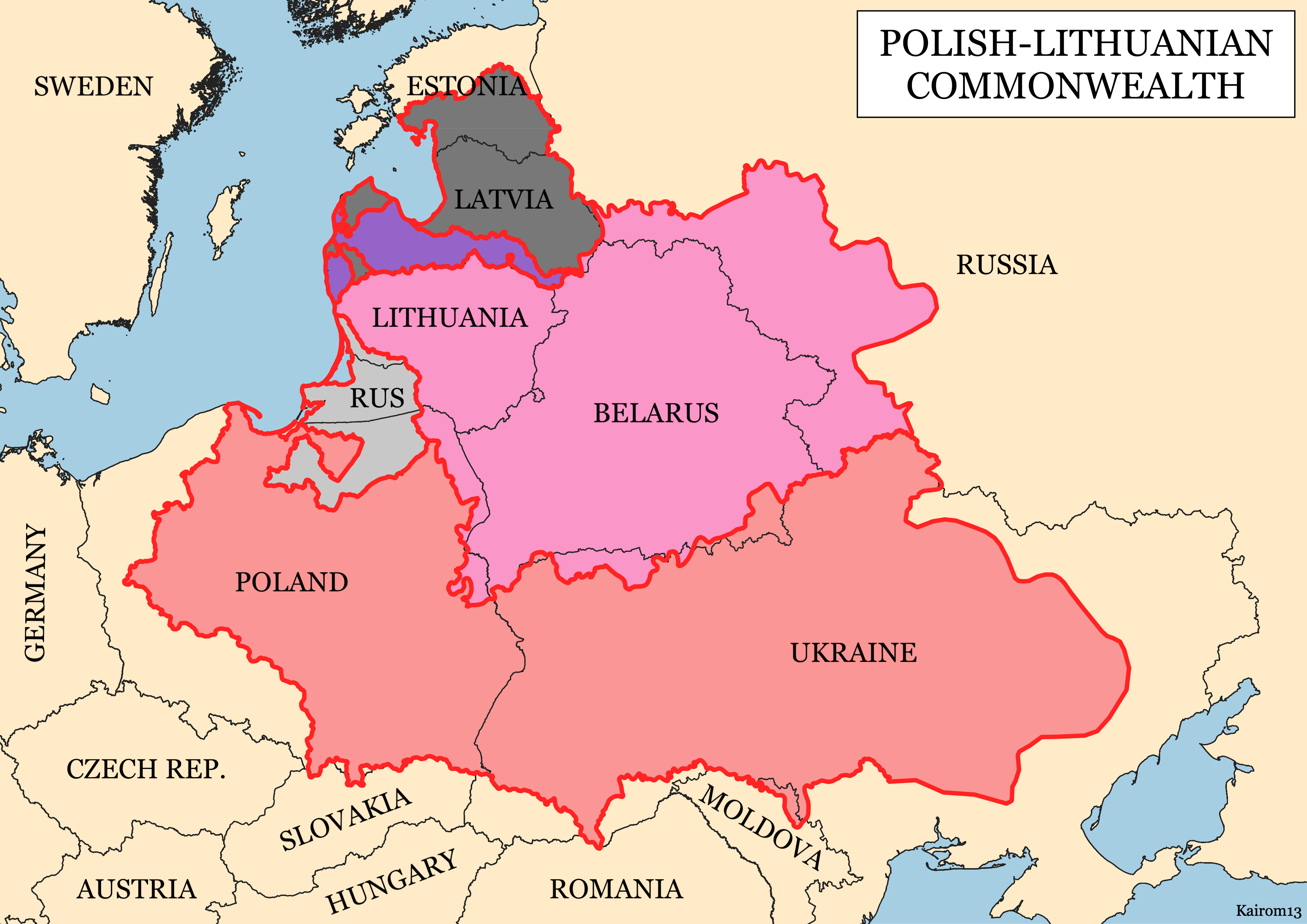
Polish–Lithuanian Commonwealth. Kingdom of Poland

Control of the territory of Ukraine in 1600

In 1569 the Union of Lublin granted the southern Lithuanian-controlled Ruthenian voivodeships of Volhynia, Podolia, Bracław and Kiev—to the Crown of Poland under the agreement forming the new Polish–Lithuanian Commonwealth (Rzeczpospolita). The Kingdom of Poland already controlled several Ruthenian lands which formed the voivodeships of Lviv and Belz. The combined lands would be formed into the Lesser Poland Province, Crown of the Kingdom of Poland.

Although the local nobility were formally granted full rights within the Rzeczpospolita by a 1572 royal decree, this was often ignored by city councils, and both the nobility and city burghers were under enormous pressure to convert to Roman Catholicism and use the Polish language. This assimilation of Polish culture on the part of the Ruthenian nobility alienated them from the lower classes, and most especially to the Cossacks, who proved stubbornly resistant to Catholicism and Polonization. It was especially important in regard to powerful and traditionally influential great princely families of Ruthenian origins, among them Wiśniowiecki, Czartoryski, Ostrogski, Sanguszko, Zbaraski, Korecki and Zasławski, which acquired even more power and were able to gather more lands, creating huge latifundia. This szlachta, along with upper-class Polish magnates, oppressed the lower-class Ruthenians, with the introduction of Counter-Reformation missionary practices and the use of Jewish arendators to manage their estates.

Local Orthodox traditions were also affected from the assumption of ecclesiastical power by the Grand Duchy of Moscow in 1448. The growing Russian state in the north sought to acquire the southern lands of Kievan Rus', and with the fall of Constantinople it began this process by insisting that the Metropolitan of Moscow and All Rus′ was now the primate of the Russian Church.

The pressure of Catholic expansionism culminated with the Union of Brest in 1596, which attempted to retain the autonomy of the Eastern Orthodox churches in present-day Ukraine, Poland and Belarus by aligning themselves with the Bishop of Rome. Many Cossacks were also against the Uniate Church. While all of the people did not unite under one church, the concepts of autonomy were implanted into consciousness of the area and came out in force during the military campaign of Bohdan Khmelnytsky.

== Khmelnytsky's role ==
Born to a noble family, Bohdan Khmelnytsky attended a Jesuit school, probably in Lviv. At the age of 22, he joined his father in the service of the Commonwealth, battling against the Ottoman Empire in the Moldavian Magnate Wars. After being held captive in Constantinople, he returned home as a Registered Cossack, settling in his khutor Subotiv with a wife and several children. He participated in campaigns for Grand Crown Hetman Stanisław Koniecpolski, led delegations to King Władysław IV Vasa in Warsaw and generally was well-respected within the Cossack ranks. The course of his life was altered, however, when Aleksander Koniecpolski, heir to hetman Koniecpolski's magnate estate, attempted to seize Khmelnytsky's land. In 1647 Chyhyryn deputy of starosta (head of the local royal administration) Daniel Czapliński openly started to harass Khmelnytsky on behalf of the younger Koniecpolski in an attempt to force him off the land. On two occasions raids were made to Subotiv, during which considerable property damage was done and his son Yurii was badly beaten, until Khmelnytsky moved his family to a relative's house in Chyhyryn. He twice sought assistance from the king by traveling to Warsaw, only to find him either unwilling or powerless to confront the will of a magnate.

Having received no support from Polish officials, Khmelnytsky turned to his Cossack friends and subordinates. The case of a Cossack being unfairly treated by the Poles found a lot of support not only in his regiment but also throughout the Sich. All through the autumn of 1647, Khmelnytsky travelled from one regiment to another and had numerous consultations with different Cossack leaders throughout Ukraine. His activity raised the suspicions of Polish authorities already used to Cossack revolts, and he was promptly arrested. Polkovnyk (colonel) Mykhailo Krychevsky assisted Khmelnytsky in his escape, and with a group of supporters he headed for the Zaporozhian Sich.

The Cossacks were already on the brink of a new rebellion as plans for the new war with the Ottoman Empire proposed by the Polish king Władysław IV Vasa were rejected by the Sejm. Cossacks were gearing up to resume their traditional and lucrative attacks on the Ottoman Empire (in the first quarter of the 17th century they raided the Black Sea shores almost annually), as they greatly resented being prevented from the pirate activities by the peace treaties between the Polish–Lithuanian Commonwealth and the Ottoman Empire. Rumors about the emerging hostilities with "the infidels" were greeted with joy, and the news that there was to be no raiding after all was explosive in itself.

However, the Cossack rebellion might have fizzled in the same manner as the great rebellions of 1637–1638, but for the strategies of Khmelnytsky. Having possibly taken part in the 1637 rebellion, he realized that Cossacks, while having an excellent infantry, could not hope to match the Polish cavalry, which was possibly the best in Europe at the time. However, combining Cossack infantry with Crimean Tatar cavalry could provide a balanced military force and give the Cossacks a chance to beat the Polish army.

== Chronology ==
While the starting point of the conflict is clear, sources vary as to when the uprising ended. Russian and some Polish sources give the end-date of the revolt as 1654, pointing to the Treaty of Pereyaslav as its ending point; Ukrainian sources give the date as Khmelnytsky's death in 1657; and a few Polish sources give the date as 1655 and the Battle of Jezierna or Jeziorna (November 1655). There is some overlap between the last phase of the uprising and the beginning of the Russo-Polish War (1654–1667), as Cossack and Russian forces became allied.

== Course of the uprising ==
=== Beginning (January–April 1648) ===
On January 25, 1648, Khmelnytsky brought a contingent of 400–500 Cossacks to the island of Tomakivka, 60 kilometres to the south of Khortytsia, and attacked the Sich on Mykytyn Rih, which had been guarded by Crown Army troops and Registered Cossacks. Following the defeat of the royal garrison, Registered Cossacks joined the rebels, and their commander fled. Once at the Sich, his oratory and diplomatic skills struck a nerve with oppressed Cossacks. As his men repelled an attempt by Commonwealth forces to retake the Sich, more recruits joined his cause. The Cossack Rada elected Khemlnytsky Hetman by the end of the month. Khmelnytsky threw most of his resources into recruiting more fighters. He sent emissaries to Crimea, enjoining the Tatars to join him in a potential assault against their shared enemy, the Commonwealth.

By April 1648 word of an uprising had spread throughout the Commonwealth, as Khmelnytskyi's universals calling for the defence of "ancient Greek faith" against "Polish enemies" were distributed around Ukraine. The hetman also used his connections to acquire gunpowder and other military goods in Volhynia, Galicia and even in Poland itself. After diplomatic negotiations with Crimean khan Islam III Giray, a military alliance was created between him and the Cossacks. Simultaneously, Khmelnytsky engaged in written correspondence with Crown hetman Mikołaj Potocki, urging him to abolish the Ordination of 1638, remove crown troops from Ukraine and allow the Cossacks to engage in naval campaigns. These demands were likely part of a tactic aimed to prolong the time for military preparations, and were discarded by authorities.

=== Initial Cossack victories (April–May 1648) ===
Locations during the Khmelnitsky Uprising: Number=last digit of year; Blue Triangle=Cossack victory; Yellow Dot=Cossack defeat; Circle=siege

Either because they underestimated the size of the uprising, or because they wanted to act quickly to prevent it from spreading, the Commonwealth's Grand Crown Hetman Mikołaj Potocki and Field Crown Hetman Marcin Kalinowski sent 3,000 soldiers under the command of Potocki's son, Stefan, towards Khmelnytsky, without waiting to gather additional forces from Prince Jeremi Wiśniowiecki. Four regiments of Registered Cossacks were sent on boats down by the Dnieper, meanwhile two others joined a mercenary squad marching from Kryliv. After leaving the Sich in late April, the Cossack army, numbering around 8,000 men, joined forces with a 3,000–4,000 squad of Perekop bey Tugay.

Khmelnytsky marshalled his forces and met his enemy at the Battle of Zhovti Vody on 29 April 1648. The Polish troops took a defensive position, meanwhile the main body of Khmelnytskyi's Zaporozhians marched to the Dnieper, where they met the Registered Cossacks and persuaded them to join the rebellion. Later on, two Cossack regiments supporting the besieged Polish army also deserted, forcing the Poles to start negotiations. However, the talks failed, and on 14 May Khmelnytsky ordered his troops to storm the camp. After a breakout attempt, on the night of 15–16 May Polish troops were encircled and routed.

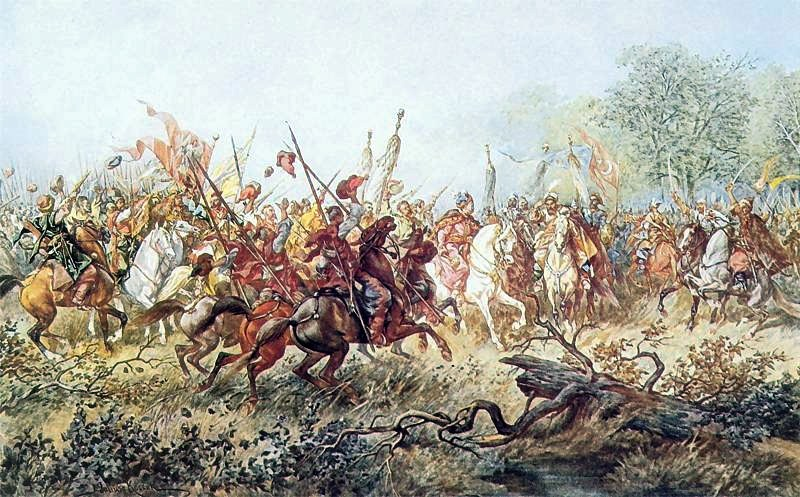
Meeting of Bohdan Khmelnytsky with Tugay Bey by Juliusz Kossak.

After the victory at Zhovti Vody, Khmelnytsky's vistorious Cossacks swiftly marched northwards, approaching the camp of both crown hetmans on the bank of Ros river near Korsun. On 25 May the troops of colonel Maksym Kryvonis, aided by Tatars of Tugay Bey, cut the ways of retreat for Polish forces. During an breakout attempt, the troops of the elder Potocki and Kalinowski were ambushed in a deep ravine on the road leading from Korsun to Bohuslav. Despite fighting bravely, both commanders were captured and imprisoned by the Tatars, and most of their soldiers perished.

In addition to the loss of significant forces and military leadership, the Polish state also lost King Władysław IV Vasa, who died in 1648, a few days before the Battle of Korsun, leaving the Crown of Poland leaderless and in disarray at a time of rebellion. The szlachta was on the run from its peasants, their palaces and estates in flames. All the while, Khmelnytsky's army marched westward.

=== First attempts at diplomacy (Summer 1648) ===
Following the king's death, the real power over the Commonwealth became concentrated in the hands of chancellor Jerzy Ossoliński. At his initiative, in June a government delegation was sent to the rebels, headed by Orthodox nobleman Adam Kysil. Khmelnytsky stopped his forces at Bila Tserkva and issued a list of demands to the Polish Crown, including raising the number of Registered Cossacks, returning churches taken from the Orthodox faithful and paying the Cossacks for wages, which had been withheld for five years.

News of the peasant uprisings now troubled a nobleman such as Khmelnytsky; however, after discussing information gathered across the country with his advisers, the Cossack leadership soon realized the potential for autonomy was there for the taking. Although Khmelnytsky's personal resentment of the szlachta and the magnates influenced his transformation into a revolutionary, it was his ambition to become the ruler of a Ruthenian nation that expanded the uprising from a simple rebellion into a national movement.

=== Continuation of hostilities (September–November 1648) ===
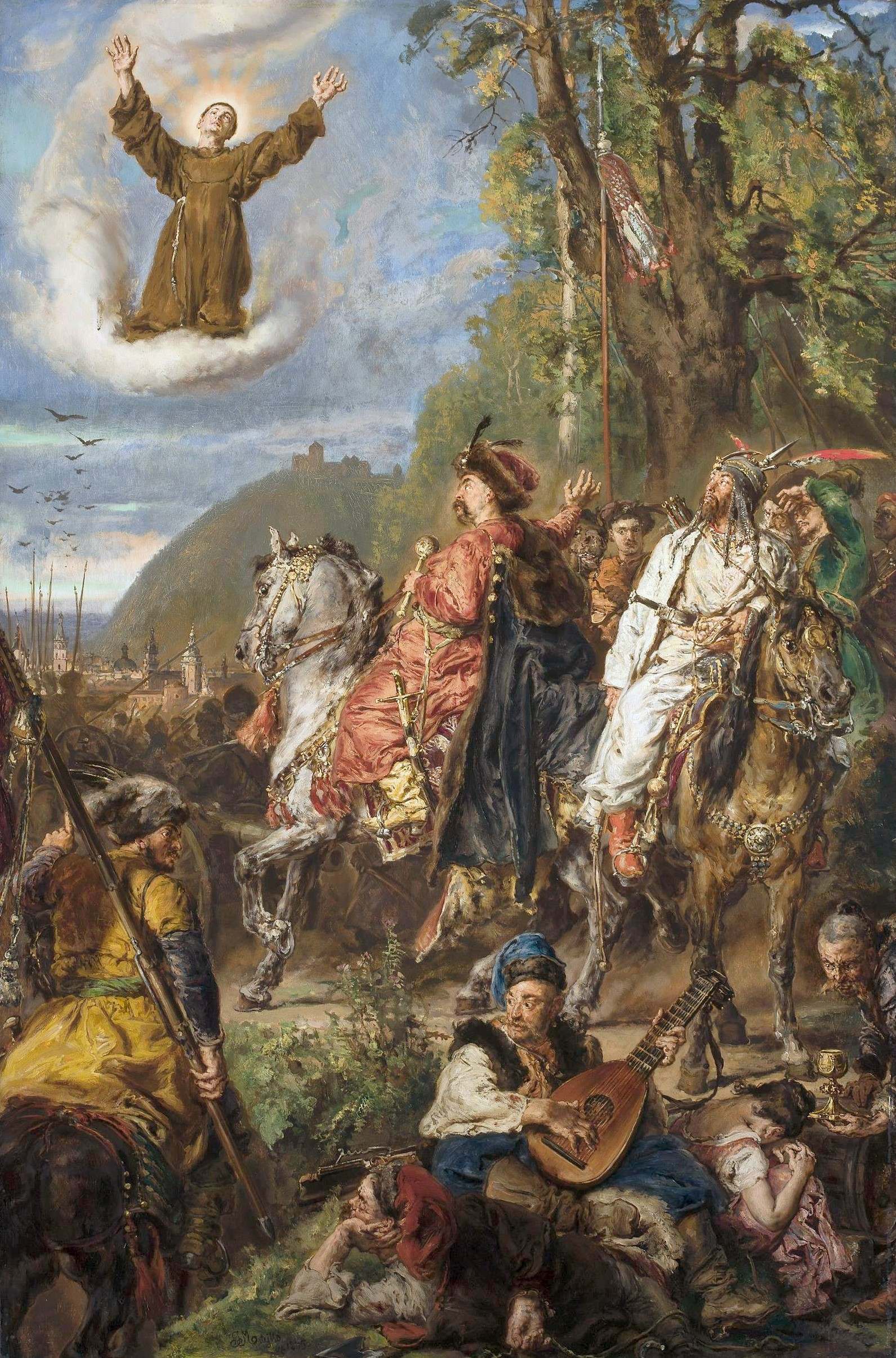
Bohdan Khmelnytsky with Tugay Bey at Lviv, oil on canvas by Jan Matejko, 1885, National Museum in Warsaw.

In parallel to peace talks, both sides of the conflict continued to concentrate their forces. Starting from late June, royal troops under command of Władysław Dominik Zasławski, Mikołaj Ostroróg and Aleksander Koniecpolski gathered in Volhynia, numbering around 35,000–40,000 soldiers. However, the attitude of the commanders to rebels, who were numerically superior, was too self-secure and not adequate to the real situation. On their march to meet the insurgents, Polish forces were slowed down by the huge baggage train, which consisted of up to 100,000 carts. Upon reaching the river Ikva, on 23 September the crown army found itself opposed by Cossack troops numbering 50,000–70,000 men, aided by Tatar cavalry. At the Battle of Pyliavtsi, Khmelnytsky's forces managed to annihilate the enemy infantry, forcing the rest of the Polish army, including its commanders, to flee in panic. The new victory allowed the rebels to capture over 90 cannons, as well as large amounts of gunpowder, firearms, horses and other goods with an estimated price of 7 to 10 million złotys. The shameful retreat of royal troops opened Khmelnytsky the way for further advance in the western direction.

Khmelnytsky's campaign in Galicia served as a demonstration of his army's force. After reaching Lviv in early October, the Cossack army besieged the city for three weeks before lifting the siege in exchange for a ransom of 200,000 ducats, with much of the sum being used to pay the hetman's Tatar allies. After obtaining the ransom, on 26 October the Cossack army moved to besiege Zamość. Simultaneously, a peasant war continued to burn in the Cossacks' rear, bringing devastation to noble estates in Volhynia, Galicia and Pokuttia and resulting in deaths of many members of the szlachta. Possible capture of Zamość by Khmelnytsky would make the rebels' way on Warsaw practically open, so a possibility of calling up a pospolite ruszenie was viewed by the Sejm, with Jeremi Wisniowiecki being appointed to lead it. In the simultaneous electoral fight between various candidates for the Polish throne, Khmelnytsky hinted at his support for John II Casimir Vasa. At the same time, the size of the Cossack army was decreasing due to exhaustion, hunger, disease and loss of motivation among many rebels. After the election of John II Casimir as Polish king on 17 November, parts of the Cossack starshyna voiced their support for negotiations with the new monarch.

=== New ceasefire and Khmelnytsky's claims (Winter of 1648–1649) ===
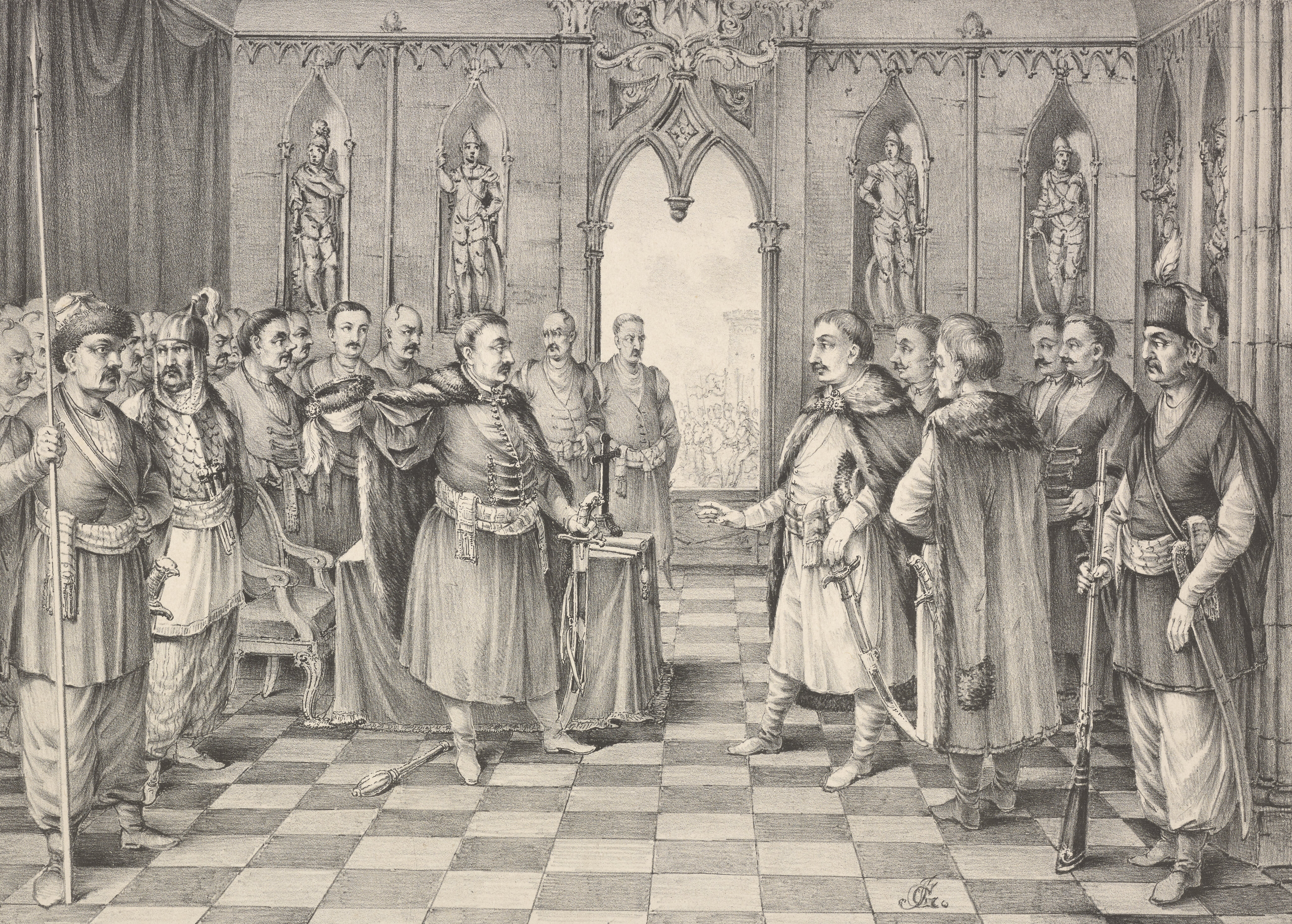
Reception of John Casimir's envoy by Khmelnytsky in Zamość

According to Hrushevsky, John Casimir personally sent Khmelnytsky a letter informing the Cossack leader about his election. He assured him that he would grant Cossacks and all followers of the Orthodox faith various privileges and requested for Khmelnytsky to stop his campaign and await the royal delegation. Khmelnytsky answered that he would comply with his monarch's request and then turned back. On 23–24 November Cossack troops left Zamość. On his march back to Ukraine, Khmelnytsky issued orders for revolting peasants to obey their landlords. On 2 January 1649, Khmelnytsky triumphantly entered Kyiv, where he was met by Patriarch Paisius of Jerusalem and Kyiv Metropolitan Sylvester Kosiv and publicly hailed as "the Moses, savior, redeemer, and liberator of the people from Polish captivity ... the illustrious ruler of Rus".

In February 1649, during negotiations with a Polish delegation headed by nobleman Adam Kysil in Pereiaslav, Khmelnytsky declared that he was "the sole autocrat of Rus" and that he had "enough power in Ukraine, Podolia, and Volhynia ... in his land and principality stretching as far as Lviv, Chełm, and Halych". It became clear to the Polish envoys that Khmelnytsky had positioned himself no longer as simply a leader of the Zaporozhian Cossacks but as that of an independent state and stated his claims to the heritage of the Rus'.

A Vilnius panegyric in Khmelnytsky's honour (1650–1651) explained it: "While in Poland it is King Jan II Casimir Vasa, in Rus it is Hetman Bohdan Khmelnytsky".

=== Campaign of 1649 ===
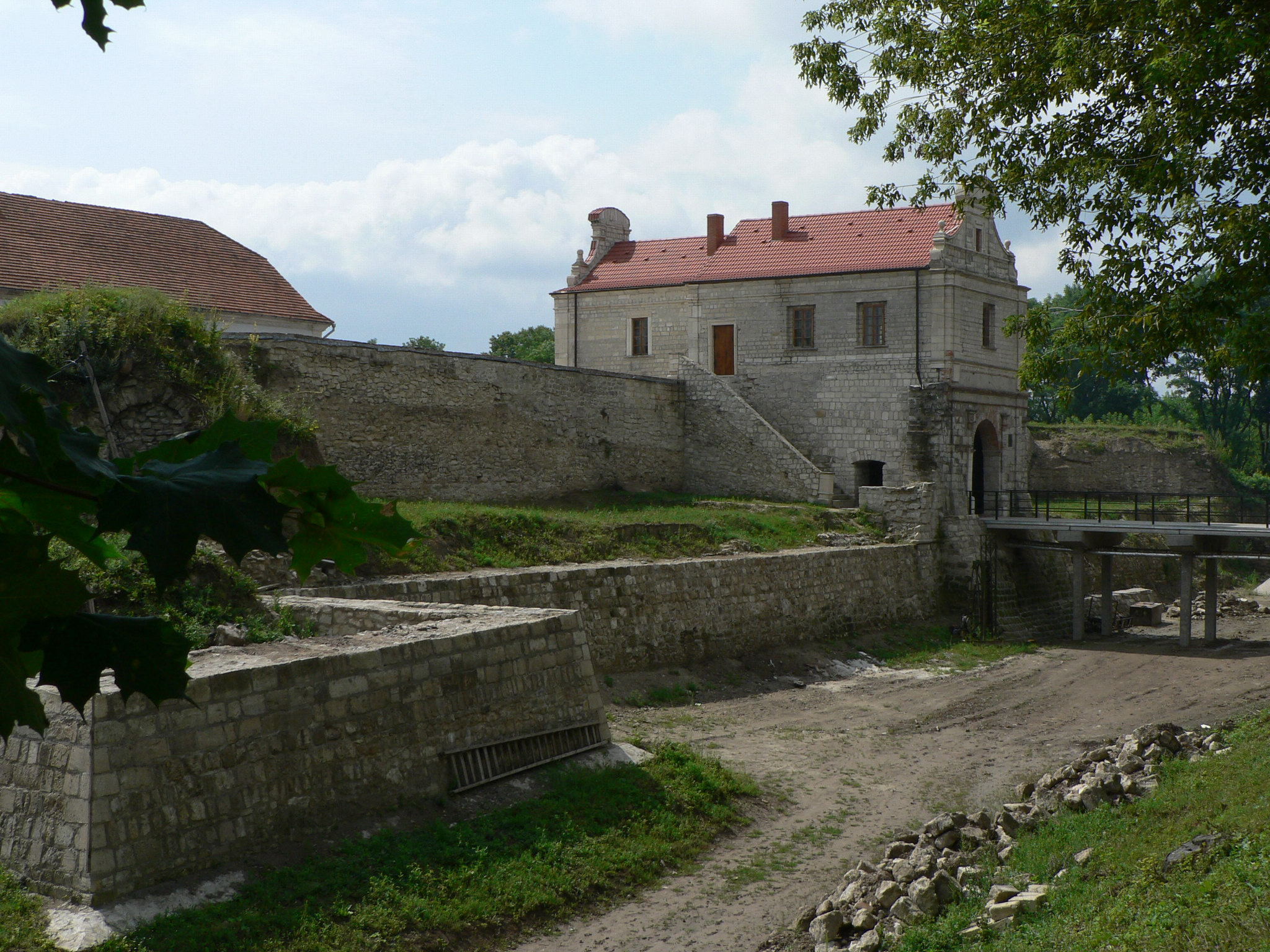
Zbarazh Castle, where Commonwealth troops were besieged by Khmelnytsky's forces

The ceasefire reached at Zamość was hard to support for both sides, and already in March 1649 Khmelnytsky sent a number of his units to fortify the defence on Sluch and Murafa rivers, meanwhile magnate forces crossed the Horyn. From February, hostilities were taking place around Bar in Podolia. Tatar forces were gathering in Ukraine, with khan Islam III Giray personally arriving to lead his troops. By late May, 120,000–150,0000 men, including 30,000–40,0000 Cossacks, as well as numerous recruits and volunteers, had gathered in the vicinity of Kyiv. From there, the force marched to meet the Polish crown army, which counted only up to 15,000 soldiers. Upon Khmelnytsky's approach to Starokostiantyniv in late June, Polish troops commanded by Adam Firlej retreated to the fortress of Zbarazh. After failing to capture the fortification, on 20 July Cossack troops started a siege.

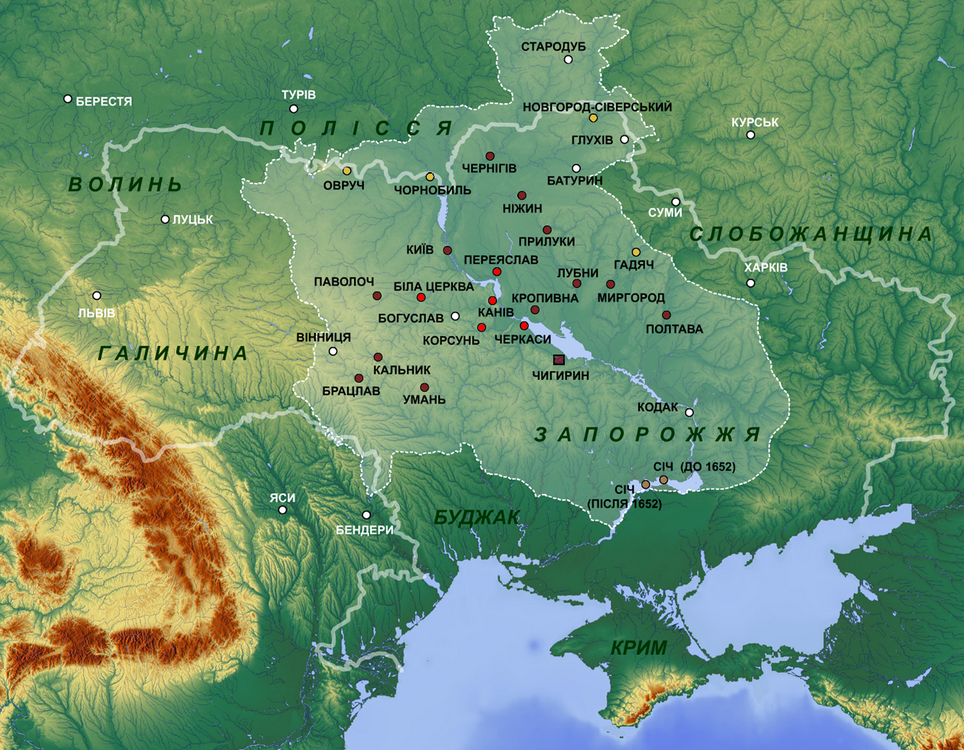
Territory of the Cossack Hetmanate according to the Treaty of Zboriv

Amidst the siege, in early August elements of Cossack and Tatar cavalry jointly led by Khmelnytsky and Islam III Giray moved out to meet the Polish relief force advancing from Zamość, which numbered 15,000–20,000 soldiers and was personally led by the king. On 15 August, the royal army was ambushed by Khmelnytsky's troops while crossing the Strypa river near the town of Zboriv. In the following battle the crown army lost up to 7,000 men, and the monarch himself found himself surrounded by the Cossacks and Tatars. In order to break the alliance between Khmelnytsky and the khan, John II Casimir sent envoys to the Tatar camp. As a result of following negotiations, which were later joined by the Cossacks as well, on 19 August 1649 the hetman agreed to the Treaty of Zboriv, according to which the Commonwealth would make numerous concessions. The treaty provided autonomy to Cossack-held voivodeships of Kyiv, Bratslav and Chernihiv, as well as eastern parts of Volhynia and Podolia up to the river Sluch. Administrative positions in those areas could be held only by Orthodox Ruthenian nobility, and all Jesuits and Jews had to be expelled. Participants of the rebellion were to get amnesty.

Following the Treaty of Zboriv, on 23 August Cossack troops lifted the siege of Zbarazh, ending the campaign. The return of peace was marred by the actions of Tatars, who, on their way back to Crimea, engaged in the taking of numerous captives from among the local population, violating the agreements with Cossacks. The peace treaty itself turned to be short-lived, and by 1650 the pro-war party took head in the Commonwealth's politics, starting preparations for new hostilities.

=== Campaign of 1651 ===
In December 1650, the Sejm approved the decision to increase the size of the Polish and Lithuanian armies to 36 and 15 thousand men respectively, and to introduce general mobilization of szlachta (pospolite ruszenie) for the next year. By April 1651, the mobilized forces, numbering 40,000 regular soldiers, as many mercenaries and up to 60,000–80,000 members of noble militia, had been concentrated near Sokal on the border of Galicia and Volhynia. Khmelnytsky meanwhile concentrated his troops, numbering up to 100,000 men, around half of them Cossacks, near Zbarazh. There the hetman's forces were joined by Tatar cavalry of Islam III Giray, numbering 30,000–40,000 horsemen.

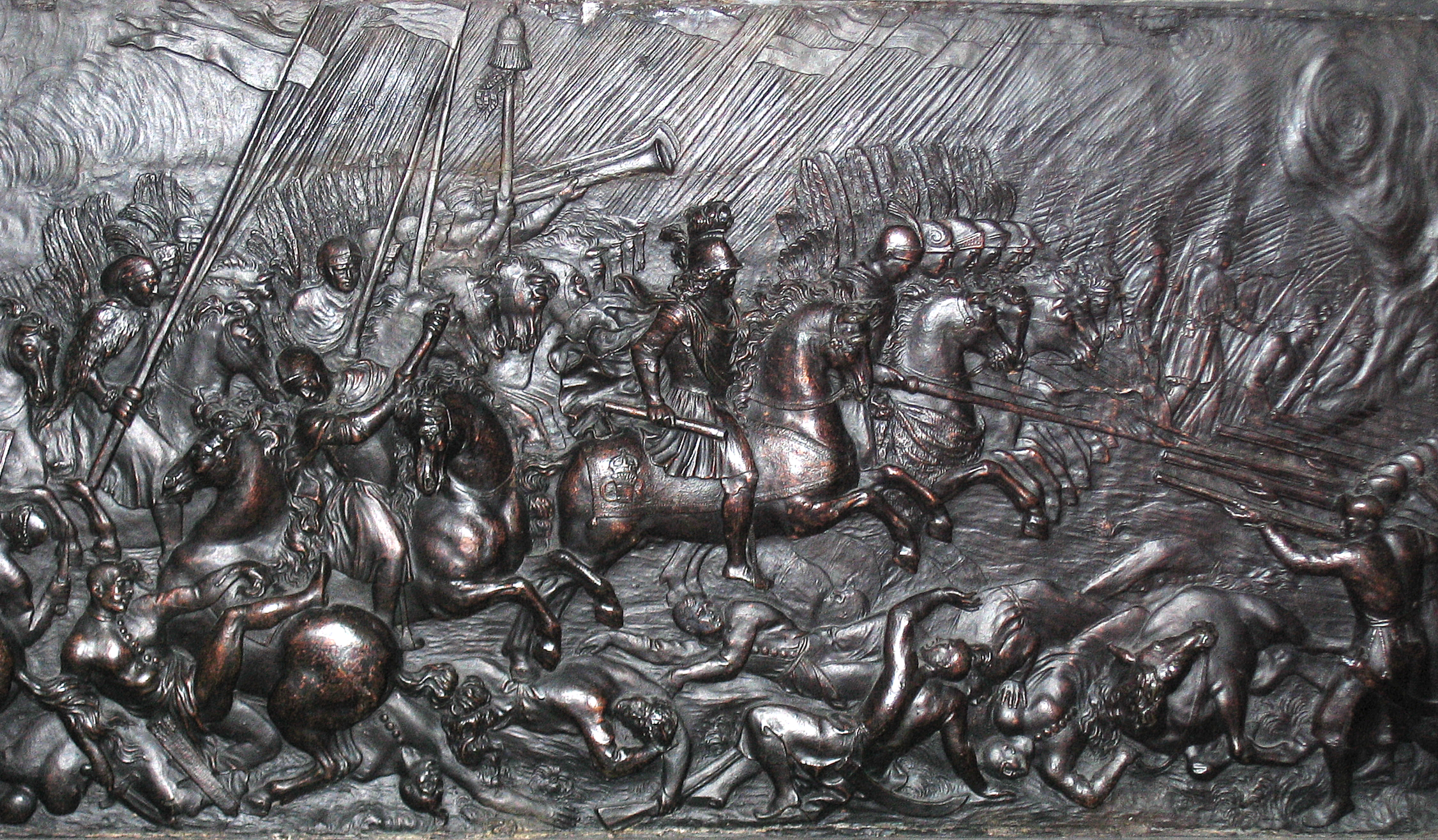
Depiction of John II Casimir Vasa at the Battle of Berestechko on a relief by Jean Thibaut

On 28 June 1651 the two opposing armies met in a lowland on the outskirts of the town of Berestechko, starting what would become one of the largest and bloodiest European battles of the 17th century. After two days without a decisive winner, the morning of 30 June saw a lull in fighting due to thick fog covering the battlefield. After midnight, Commonwealth cavalrymen led by Jeremi Wisniowiecki performed an attack, which allowed German mercenaries to break through Cossack positions and reach Islam Geray's tent. The attack, during which the ruler himself was wounded and his deputy killed, made the Tatars flee in panic. Attempting to stop his essential allies from leaving the battlefield, Khmelnytsky pursued the retreating khan, but was taken prisoner by his men. Having lost the support of Tatars and deprived of their commander, the Cossacks retreated to the banks of river Pliashivka, where they erected a temporary fortification, defending it for the following ten days. Finally, on the night of 9 to 10 June Cossack forces under the leadership of Khmelnytsky's deputy Ivan Bohun started a retreat across the river. However, the withdrawal of Cossack cavalry caused panic among mobilized peasants, leading to the destruction of Bohun's rearguard. During one day, over 8,000 soldiers of the Cossack army perished, with Polish troops capturing most of their opponents' artillery and gunpowder and taking control over Khmelnytsky's documents, regalia and the hetman's treasury. Bohun was able to retreat with a cavalry corps numering 20,000 men, as well as parts of artillery.

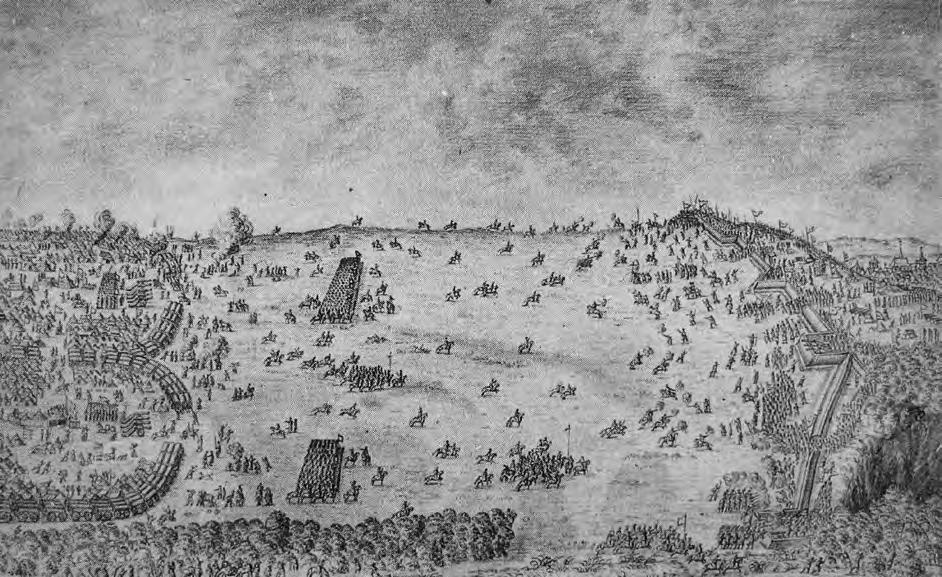
Battle of Bila Tserkva by Abraham van Westerveld

Berestechko didn't lead to a decisive defeat for Cossacks and their army fully recovered two months after the battle, but nonetheless Polish magnates recovered their possessions in Right-Bank Ukraine, with the Right-Bank population fleeing to Left-Bank and Sloboda Ukraine. According to Ukrainian historian Natalia Yakovenko, the battle represented a turning point, during which the uprising led by Khmelnytsky transformed from a civil war inside of the Commonwealth into a full-scale Polish-Ukrainian war. In their pursuit of the retreating Cossack troops, Commonwealth forces were incessantly harassed by partisans, with local peasants ruining bridges and river crossings. Hunger forced the soldiers to feed themselves with dead horses and grain from the fields, and epidemics contributed to mass deaths and desertion of troops. Jeremi Wisniowiecki himself died during the march after falling sick near Pavoloch. Meanwhile, Khmelnytsky was able to escape Tatar captivity and arrived to Bila Tserkva, where he gathered troops from around Right-bank Ukraine, establishing a fortified camp. By the second half of August, the hetman could amass an army of 25,000 Cossacks and 6,000 Nogays. Another 4,000 Cossacks were stationed in Left-bank Ukraine threatening Kyiv, which had been recently taken by the Lithuanian army of Janusz Radziwiłł.

After both sides had been exhausted at Bila Tserkva, they signed Treaty of Bila Tserkva, which was less favourable for Cossacks. According to its terms, the Cossack registry was limited to 20,000, and Cossack autonomy was limited to Kyiv Voivodeship only. The hetman obliged himself to abandon the treaty with Crimean Tatars and refrain from any foreign contacts. However, the peace treaty was never ratified, as voting at the new Sejm, which gathered in early 1652, was blocked by one of the deputies executing his right of liberum veto.

=== Campaigns of 1652-1653 ===
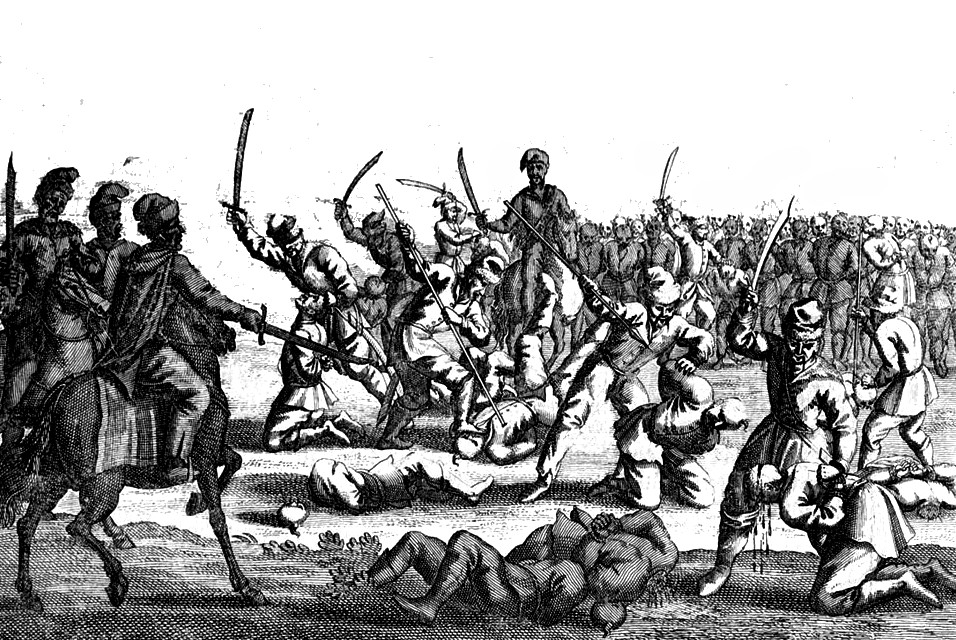
Execution of Polish captives after the battle of Batih

The failure to ratify the Treaty of Bila Tserkva allowed Khmelnytsky to resume hostilities, and in April 1652 he informed his starshyna about new war preparations. The formal ground for a new campaign was the planned invasion of a Cossack-Tatar force led by the hetman's son Tymish into Moldova. Troops led by field hetman Marcin Kalinowski, counting 12,000 hussars and 8,000 infantry, marched to stop the Cossack force and encamped themselves near the Batih, a mountain located over the Buh river not far from Ladyzhyn. The Polish force was taken by surprise when Tatar cavalry attacked the camp, surrounding it by the evening of 1 June. Next day Polish positions were stormed and taken by force, killing Kalinowski and half of his hussars. The Battle of Batih served as a revenge for the previous year's defeat at Berestechko, with Khmelnytsky ordering Cossacks to kill all Polish prisoners, part of whom were bought from the Tatars, in an event known as the Batih massacre.

Following the victory at Batih, Khmelnytsky proposed the Commonwealth to restore the Treaty of Zboriv, but the Sejm refused the offer. By the end of the year, Commonwealth army was expanded to 34,000 soldiers, including 68 new cavalry units. In March 1653 a new invasion by Polish troops started in the area of Bratslav, with units commanded by Stefan Czarniecki devastating the region. In July of the same year the king personally arrived to Hlyniany near Lviv in order to head the crown army. All approaches for new negotiations by Khmelnytsky were demonstratively ignored. In early October, the royal army established its camp near Zhvanets on the Dniester, across the river from Khotyn. Numbering around 40,000 soldiers, the Polish force was blocked by a similar-sized army of Cossacks supported by Tatars. After an exhausting siege, khan Islam III Giray initiated a round of negotiations, which resulted in the signing of a new peace treaty on 17 December.

=== Muscovy's entry into the conflict (1654–1655) ===
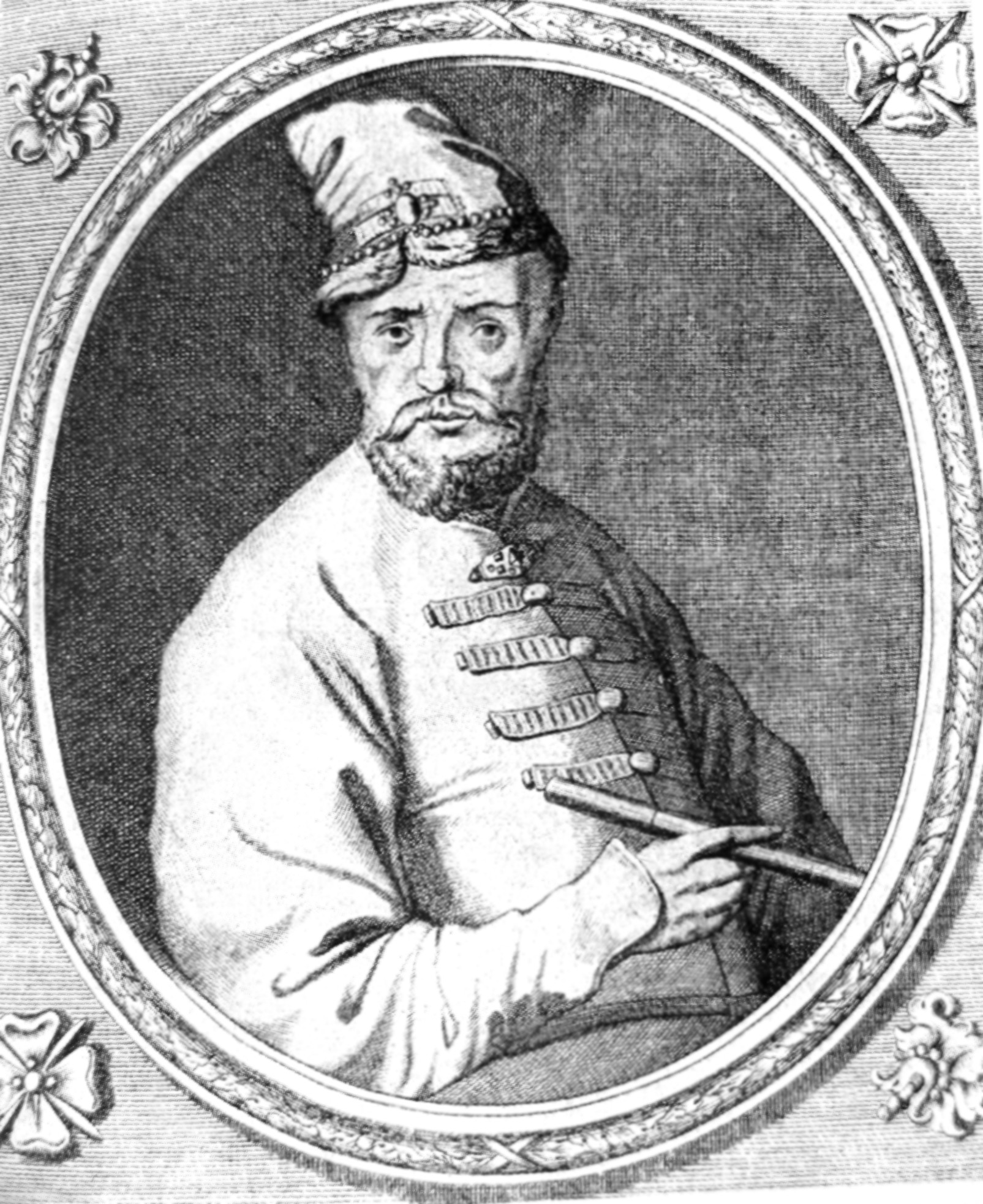
Vasily Sheremetev, the commander of Moscow's troops in Ukraine following the alliance with Khmelnytsky

As the siege of Zhvanets was still ongoing, on 11 October 1653 the Zemsky Sobor of Muscovy approved the decision to accept the Zaporozhian Host under the rule of the tsar. This signified a new escalation in the war, which after six years started to attain an international character. Following the signing of the Treaty of Pereyaslav in early 1654, a 18,000-strong Cossack force commanded by acting hetman Ivan Zolotarenko assisted the tsar's army during its invasion of Belarus. By July 1654 Zolotarenko's troops had occupied the areas of Bykhaw, Krychaw and Mogilev, where they spent the following winter. During the summer of 1655 Cossack troops continued their advance northwards, taking Svislach and Minsk. After uniting with Muscovite forces, Zolotarenko's troops moved on to Vilnius and Grodno.

Facing the newly established alliance between the Cossacks and Moscow, in June 1654 Poland signed an "eternal treaty" with Crimea in Bakhchisaray, breaking the union between the khan and Khmelnytsky. From that point, royal troops and Tatars would coordinate their actions against the hetman. In October 1654 a 30,000-strong force under command of Seweryn Potocki entered the region of Bratslav, meanwhile the Tatars moved in the direction of Uman. The raid devastated the region of Podolia, forcing thousands to flee to Moldova and delaying Khmelnytsky's offensive in the direction of Volhynia. In late January 1655 the hetman's troops were finally able to unite with Moscow's troops commanded by voivode Vasily Sheremetev. Amid severe frost, on 29–31 January the allied armies encountered the crown army at the Battle of Okhmativ. The action ended in a stalemate, but succeeded in stopping the Polish advance.

=== Later campaigns and death of Khmelnytsky (1655–1657) ===
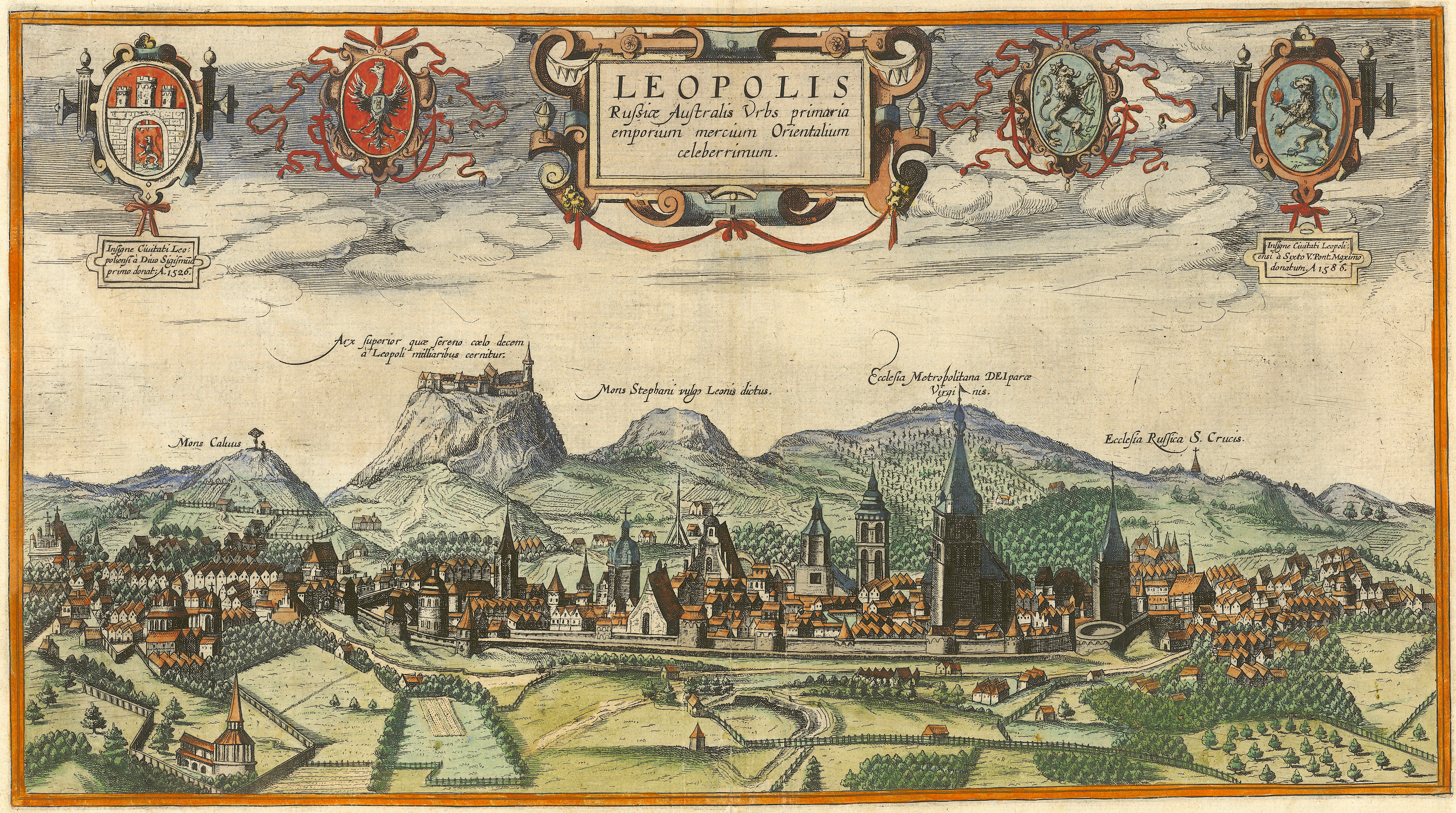
An early 17th-century view of Lviv (Lwów, Lemberg), main goal of the Cossack-Muscovite campaign

The so-called Swedish Deluge, initiated by the decision of Swedish king Charles X Gustav to use the Polish weakness in the east in order to establish control over the Baltic Sea, directly influenced the course of events in Ukraine. Already in late May 1655, weeks before the invasion, Khmelnytsky established diplomatic contacts with Charles X, joining forces with Sweden's allies – Transylvanian prince George II Rakoczi and prince elector Frederick William of Brandenburg. After uniting with a Muscovite corps under command of Vasily Buturlin, the Cossack army set out in the direction of Lviv, besieging the city on 29 September. However, a Tatar raid into Khmelnytskyi's rear forced the hetman to lift the siege in exchange for a contribution. After several battles against each other, the hetman started negotiations with the Crimean khan Mehmed IV Giray, which ended in a peace agreement.

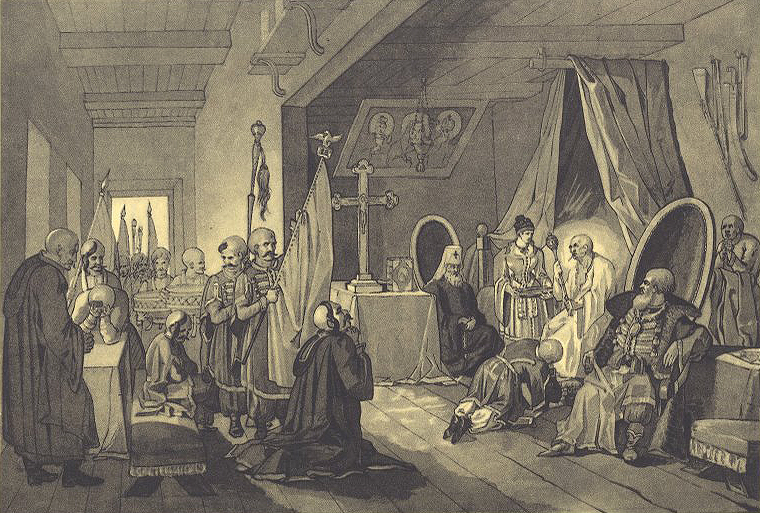
Dying Khmelnytsky transferring power to his son, a depiction by Taras Shevchenko

Khmelnytsky's passivity during the siege of Lviv was influenced by his opposition to claims issued by Charles X on Galicia, as the hetman planned to attach that territory to his state. In addition, Muscovite voivodes provoked the Cossacks by demanding that all cities taken by Khmelnytsky's troops pledge allegiance to the tsar. A similar situation arose in the Cossack-occupied areas of southern Belarus, where the rule of hetman's administration was put in question by Moscow's representatives, who considered that territory to be the property of their monarch. In May 1656 the tsar's government, fearing the rise of Sweden, broke all relations with Charles X and started peace negotiations with the Commonwealth. The talks began on 22 August in Vilnius, but the delegation of Cossack representatives sent by Khmelnytsky was denied access to the meeting. Furious at this show of disrespect, the hetman started looking for ways to break the alliance with Moscow.

In autumn 1656 Khmelnytsky signed a series of agreements with Sweden, Transylvania, Wallachia, Austria, Moldova and Crimea, and renewed talks with Poland and Turkey. Simultaneously, a Cossack corps numbering 20,000 soldiers under command of Antin Zhdanovych joined the forces of George II Rakoczi and Swedish king in their campaign against Poland. Suffering from ill health, in April Khmelnytsky gathered a council of Cossack officials and declared his 16-year-old son Yuri to be his successor. After suffering a stroke, on 6 August 1657 Bohdan Khmelnytsky died in Chyhyryn, leaving Ukraine surrounded by numerous enemies.

== Other theatres ==
=== Role of Tatars ===
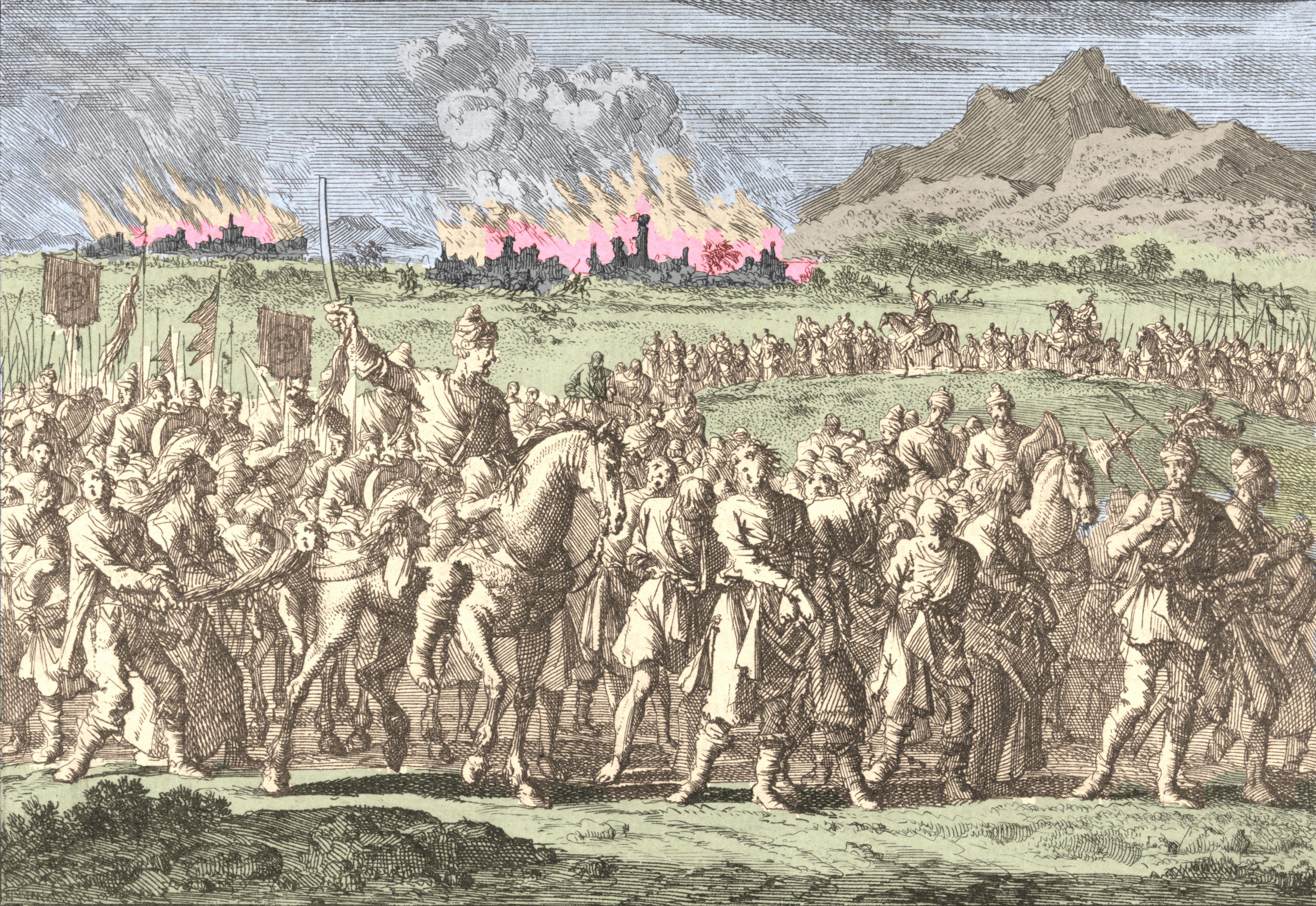
17th-century depiction of a Crimean slave raid on Poland

Bohdan Khmelnytsky's alliance with the Crimean Khanate was concluded on the conditions of Crimean Tatars being prohibited from taking Orthodox Ruthenians as yasir (slaves) and devastating Ukrainian lands. The Crimean Tatars allied with Cossacks were officially only allowed to enslave Poles and Jews. However, these conditions weren't always honored by the Tatars.

The Tatars of the Crimean Khanate, then a vassal state of the Ottoman Empire, participated in the insurrection, seeing it as a source of captives to be sold. Slave raiding sent a large influx of captives to slave markets in Crimea at the time of the Uprising. Ottoman Jews collected funds to mount a concerted ransom effort to gain the freedom of their people.

=== Cossack involvement in Moldova ===
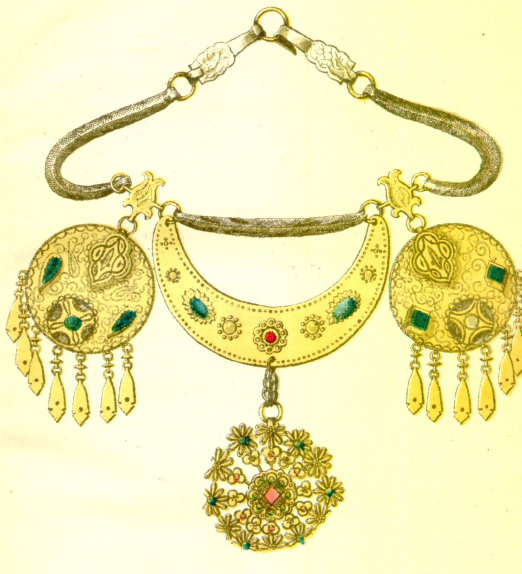
A necklace which belonged to Rozanda Lupu

Starting from October 1648, Khmelnytsky established friendly relations with Moldovan ruler Vasile Lupu, a Christian vassal of the Ottoman Empire, despite the fact that Lupu also cooperated with Warsaw. In summer 1650 kalga Kirim Geray started a punitive campaign against Moldovans after the latter had engaged in attacks against Tatars. As a vassal of the Crimean khan, Khmelnytsky was obliged to support the action, so his troops crossed the Dniester and in September 1650 took Iasi. The occupation was used by the hetman to demand the signing of an official union, as part of which his son Tymofiy (Tymish) was to marry Lupu's daughter Rozanda. This marriage would spread Ukraine's influence onto Moldova and legitimize Khmelnytsky in the circle of legitimate rulers under the Ottoman patronage. In July 1652 Tymish himself set out for Moldova with a 6,000-strong force and married to Rozanda in Iasi. In early September he returned to Ukraine with his new wife.

However, a dynastic coup, which took place in Moldova in early 1653 under the leadership of Gheorghe Stefan with the support of Transylvania and Wallachia, broke Khmelnytsky's plans. Forced to defend Lupu against his competitor, Tymish headed an army of Zaporozhian Cossacks invaded Moldova and took its capital in Suceava. The ambitious hetman's son then moved against Wallachia, but met stiff resistance from local troops and their Transylvanian allies. Forced to retreat with his force, Tymish was besieged in Suceava and died in battle. This event put an end to Khmelnytsky's plans in Moldova.

== Aftermath ==
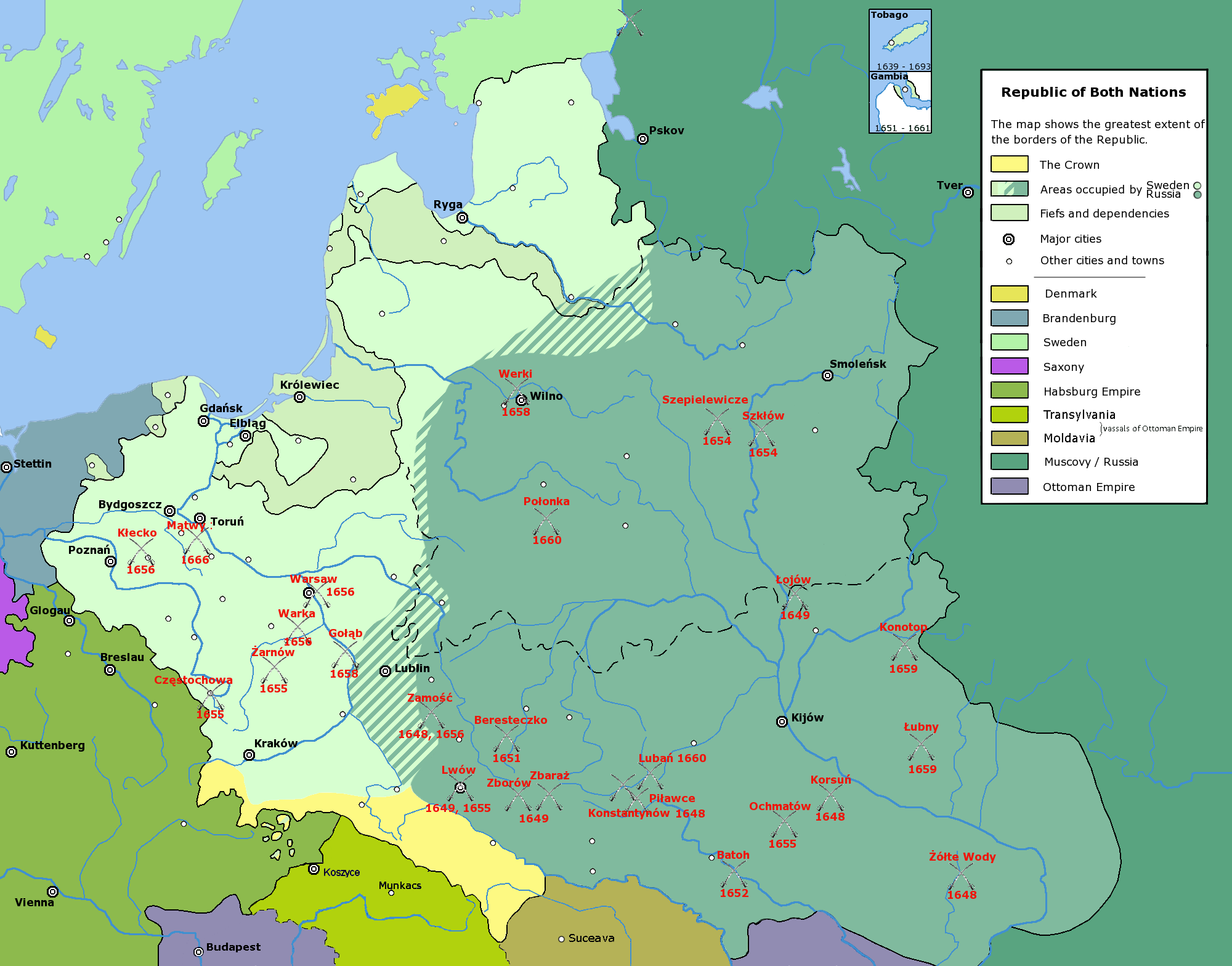
The Russo-Polish and Second Northern Wars diminished the scope of Polish–Lithuanian control.

The uprising is generally considered to have resulted in success or Cossack victory, as it achieved its main goals of ending Polish–Lithuanian rule over much of the Ukrainian lands and establishing the Cossack Hetmanate. However, the Cossacks' struggle to consolidate their victory, increasing external pressures, and internal divisions after Khmelnytsky's death led to instability and decline for his state during the post-uprising period. This period in Ukrainian history is known as the Ruin.

The uprising led to decline of the Polish–Lithuanian Commonwealth. It began a period in Polish history known as the Deluge (which included the Swedish invasion of the Commonwealth during the Second Northern War of 1655–1660), that contributed to freeing the Ruthenians (Ukrainians) from Polish domination but in a short time subjected them to Russian domination. Weakened by wars, in 1654 Khmelnytsky persuaded the Cossacks to ally with the Russian tsar in the Treaty of Pereyaslav, which led to the Russo-Polish War (1654–1667). When Poland–Lithuania and Russia signed the Truce of Vilna and agreed on an anti-Swedish alliance in 1657, Khmelnytsky's Cossacks supported the invasion of the Commonwealth by Sweden's Transylvanian allies instead. Although the Commonwealth tried to regain its influence over the Cossacks (note the Treaty of Hadiach of 1658), the new Cossack subjects became even more dominated by Russia. The Hetmanate entered a new political situation which was far different than in the Commonwealth, and the church was much more subordinate to the tsar there. Russia had a traditional practice of imprisoning as well as executing Orthodox officials, which was foreign to people from the Commonwealth. With the Commonwealth becoming increasingly weak, Cossacks became more and more integrated into the Russian Empire, with their autonomy and privileges eroded. The remnants of these privileges were gradually abolished in the aftermath of the Great Northern War (1700–1721), in which hetman Ivan Mazepa sided with Sweden. By the time that the last of the partitions of Poland ended the existence of the Commonwealth in 1795, many Cossacks had already left Ukraine to colonise the Kuban and, in process, were russified.

== Casualties ==
Estimates of the death tolls of the Khmelnytsky uprising vary, as do many others from the eras analyzed by historical demography. As better sources and methodology are becoming available, such estimates are subject to continuing revision. Population losses of the entire Commonwealth population in the years 1648–1667 (a period which includes the Uprising, but also the Polish-Russian War and the Swedish invasion) are estimated at 4 million (roughly a decrease from 11 to 12 million to 7–8 million).

=== Massacres by the rebels ===
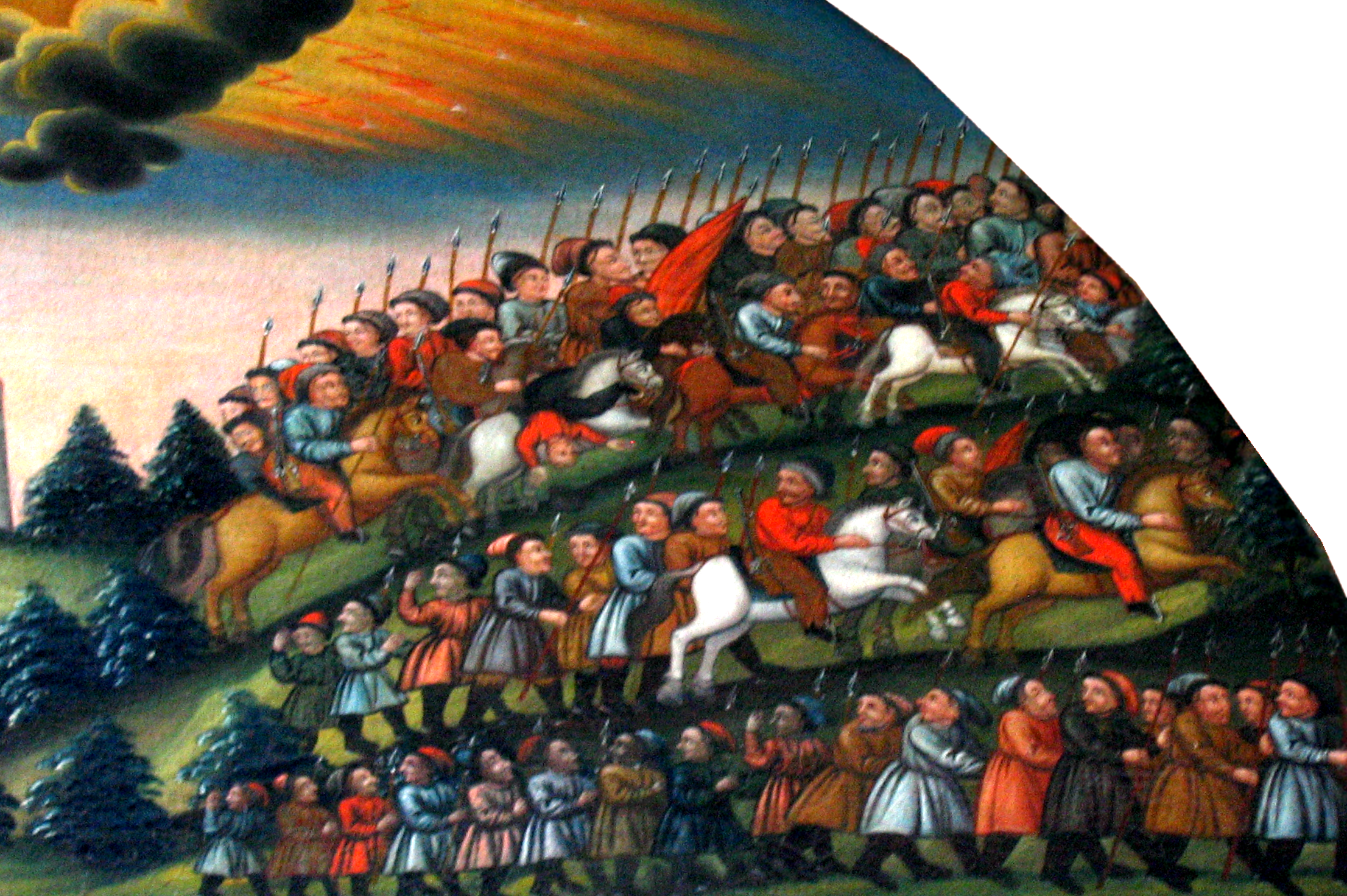
Cossack army in 1648.

From its very beginning in May 1648, the uprising which engulfed Ukraine resulted terrible causalties. The combination of social, religious and political factors resulted in the initial Cossack rebellion growing into a full-scale peasant war. In an instance, almost every peasant turned into a soldier, fighting against the previously existing regime dominated by the nobility and its Jewish representatives, and adopting a military worldview, which lifted the taboo on murder. Not only members of peasant communities, but also the townsfolk would join the rebellion en masse, electing own leaders and claiming themselves to be Cossacks. During June 1648 alone, rebel squads in Left-bank Ukraine captured the towns of Lubny, Borzna, Nizhyn and Novhorod-Siversky, destroying among others the residence of prince Jeremi Wisniowiecki. To the south of Kyiv and in the areas of Bratslav and Podillia numerous rebel groups were active. In July–August the rebel movement spread to the villages and towns in Volhynia and Polesia, and by the end of summer reached Galicia and Pokuttia. As a result, the whole territory populated by ethnic Ukrainians from Siveria to the Carpathians was engulfed in turmoil.

According to witnesses and participants of the uprising themselves, hate was the main motive of killings by the rebels. It could be provoked by religious and national factors, such as intolerance to Catholics and Poles and a wish to avenge the persecution of brothers in faith, or by social motives, as opposition to the nobility's power over the commoners.

In 1654, Paul of Aleppo reported that Cossacks had exterminated hundreds of thousands of Poles in their brutal massacres. According to Paul, Cossacks also exterminated the "whole race" of Jews and Armenians, which turned Ukraine into a monoethnic Orthodox Cossack state.

==== Mass killings of Jews ====
Before the Khmelnytsky uprising, magnates had sold and leased certain privileges to arendators, many of whom were Jewish, who earned money from the collections they made for the magnates by receiving a percentage of an estate's revenue. By not supervising their estates directly, the magnates left it to the leaseholders and collectors to become objects of hatred to the oppressed and long-suffering peasants. Khmelnytsky told the people that the Poles had sold them as slaves "into the hands of the accursed Jews." With this as their battle cry, Cossacks and the peasantry massacred numerous Jewish and Polish–Lithuanian townsfolk, as well as szlachta during the years 1648–1649. Yeven Mezulah, the contemporary 17th-century chronicle by Nathan ben Moses Hannover, an eyewitness, states:

Wherever they found the szlachta, royal officials or Jews, they [Cossacks] killed them all, sparing neither women nor children. They pillaged the estates of the Jews and nobles, burned churches and killed their priests, leaving nothing whole. It was a rare individual in those days who had not soaked his hands in blood ...

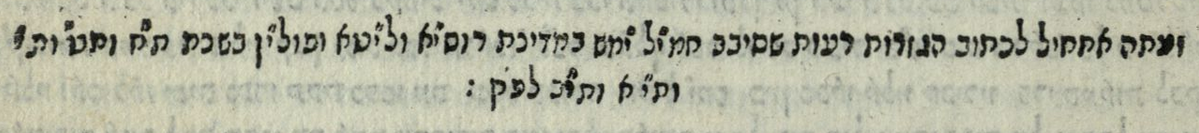
First edition of Yeven Mezulah (1653): "I write of the Evil Decrees of Chmiel, may his name be obliterated... in (5)'408 to '411 Anno Mundi"

Most Jewish communities in the rebellious Hetmanate were devastated by the uprising and ensuing massacres, though occasionally a Jewish population was spared, notably after the capture of the town of Brody (the population of which was 70% Jewish). According to the book known as History of the Rus, Khmelnytsky's rationale was largely mercantile and the Jews of Brody, which was a major trading centre, were judged to be useful "for turnovers and profits" and thus they were only required to pay "moderate indemnities" in kind. One estimate (1996) reports that 15,000–30,000 Jews were killed or taken captive, and that 300 Jewish communities were completely destroyed. A 2014 estimate puts the number of Jews that died during the national uprising of Ukrainians to 18,000–20,000 people between the years 1648–1649; of these, 3,000–6,000 Jews were killed by Cossacks in Nemirov in May 1648 and 1,500 in Tulczyn in July 1648.

In Jewish circles, this massacre became known as Gzeyres Takh Vetat, sometimes shortened to Takh Vetat (spelled in multiple ways in English. In Hebrew: גזירות ת"ח ות"ט). This translates to "the (evil) decrees of (years) 408 and 409" referring to the years 5408 and 5409 on the Jewish calendar, which corresponds to the years 1648 and 1649 on the non-Jewish calendar.

Due to the widespread murders, Jewish elders at the Council of Vilna banned merrymaking by a decree on July 3, 1661: they set limitations on wedding celebrations, public drinking, fire dances, masquerades, and Jewish comic entertainers. Stories about massacre victims who had been buried alive, cut to pieces, or forced to kill one another spread throughout Europe and beyond. These stories filled many with despair, led others to identify Sabbatai Zevi as the Messiah, and contributed in later years to growing interest in Hasidism.

The accounts of contemporary Jewish chroniclers of the events tended to emphasize large casualty figures, but since the end of the 20th century they have been re-evaluated downwards. Early 20th-century estimates of Jewish deaths were based on the accounts of the Jewish chroniclers of the time, and tended to be high, ranging from 100,000 to 500,000 or more; in 1916 Simon Dubnow stated:

The losses inflicted on the Jews of Poland during the fatal decade 1648–1658 were appalling. In the reports of the chroniclers, the number of Jewish victims varies between one hundred thousand and five hundred thousand. But even if we accept the lower figure, the number of victims still remains colossal, even exceeding the catastrophes of the Crusades and the Black Death in Western Europe. Some seven hundred Jewish communities in Poland had suffered massacre and pillage. In the Ukrainian cities situated on the left banks of the Dnieper, the region populated by Cossacks ... the Jewish communities had disappeared almost completely. In the localities on the right shore of the Dnieper or in the Polish part of Ukraine as well as those of Volhynia and Podolia, wherever Cossacks had made their appearance, only about one tenth of the Jewish population survived.

From the 1960s to the 1980s historians still considered 100,000 a reasonable estimate of the Jews killed and, according to Edward Flannery, many considered it "a minimum". Max Dimont in Jews, God, and History, first published in 1962, writes "Perhaps as many as 100,000 Jews perished in the decade of this revolution." Edward Flannery, writing in The Anguish of the Jews: Twenty-Three Centuries of Antisemitism, first published in 1965, also gives figures of 100,000 to 500,000, stating "Many historians consider the second figure exaggerated and the first a minimum." Martin Gilbert in his Jewish History Atlas published in 1976 states, "Over 100,000 Jews were killed; many more were tortured or ill-treated, others fled". Many other sources of the time give similar figures.

Although many modern sources still give estimates of Jews killed in the uprising at 100,000 or more, others put the numbers killed at between 40,000 and 100,000, and recent academic studies have argued fatalities were even lower. Modern historiographic methods, particularly from the realm of historical demography, became more widely adopted and tended to result in lower fatality numbers. Newer studies of the Jewish population of the affected areas of Ukraine in that period estimate it to be 50,000. According to Orest Subtelny:

Weinryb cites the calculations of S. Ettinger indicating that about 50,000 Jews lived in the area where the uprising occurred. See B. Weinryb, "The Hebrew Chronicles on Bohdan Khmelnytsky and the Cossack-Polish War", Harvard Ukrainian Studies 1 (1977): 153–77. While many of them were killed, Jewish losses did not reach the hair-raising figures that are often associated with the uprising. In the words of Weinryb (The Jews of Poland, 193–4), "The fragmentary information of the period—and to a great extent information from subsequent years, including reports of recovery—clearly indicate that the catastrophe may have not been as great as has been assumed."

A 2003 study by Israeli demographer Shaul Stampfer of Hebrew University dedicated solely to the issue of Jewish casualties in the uprising concludes that 18,000–20,000 Jews died out of a total population of 40,000. He attributes many of these deaths to disease and famine. Paul Robert Magocsi states that Jewish chroniclers of the 17th century "provide invariably inflated figures with respect to the loss of life among the Jewish population of Ukraine. The numbers range from 60,000–80,000 (Nathan Hannover) to 100,000 (Sabbatai Cohen), but that "[t]he Israeli scholars Shmuel Ettinger and Bernard D. Weinryb speak instead of the 'annihilation of tens of thousands of Jewish lives', and the Ukrainian-American historian Jaroslaw Pelenski narrows the number of Jewish deaths to between 6,000 and 14,000". Orest Subtelny concludes:

Between 1648 and 1656, tens of thousands of Jews—given the lack of reliable data, it is impossible to establish more accurate figures—were killed by the rebels, and to this day the Khmelnytsky uprising is considered by Jews to be one of the most traumatic events in their history.

In the two decades following the uprising the Commonwealth suffered two more major wars: The Deluge and the Polish–Russian War (1654–1667); during that period total Jewish casualties are estimated at another 20,000 to 30,000.

=== Victims among the Ukrainian population ===
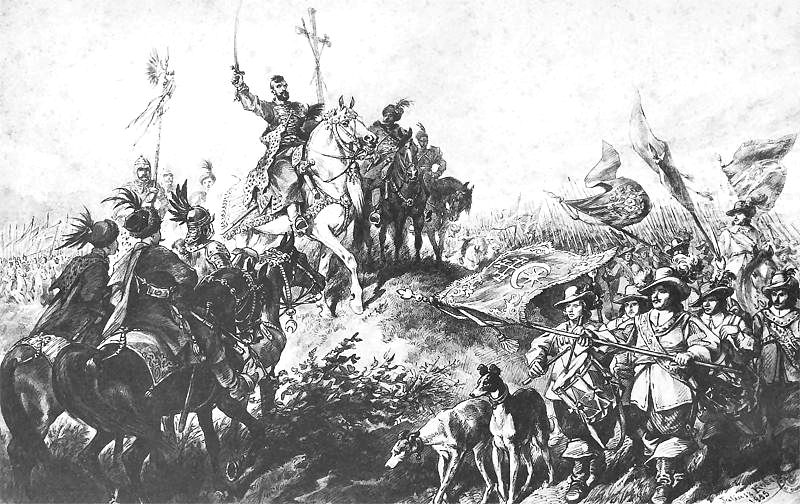
Prince Jeremi Wiśniowiecki in Lubny, 1648

While the Cossacks and peasants (known as pospolity) were in many cases the perpetrators of massacres of Polish szlachta members and their collaborators, they also suffered the horrendous loss of life resulting from Polish reprisals, Tatar raids, famine, plague and general destruction due to war.

At the initial stages of the uprising, armies of the magnate Jeremi Wiśniowiecki, on their retreat westward inflicted terrible retribution on the civilian population, leaving behind them a trail of burned towns and villages. Wisniowiecki's forces acted through terror, putting their victims on stakes, installing gallows in town squares, cutting off heads and hands, and blinding numerous people, including priests.

In addition, Khmelnytsky's Tatar allies often continued their raids against the civilian population, in spite of protests from the Cossacks. Direct confrontations also took place, such as the clash at Syni Vody in 1651, where the Cossacks had defeated and slaughtered 10,000 Crimean Tatars engaged in plunder. After the Cossacks' alliance with the Tsardom of Russia was enacted, the Tatar raids became politically unrestrained; coupled with the onset of famine, they led to a virtual depopulation of whole areas of the country. Cossacks responded with raids into the Crimean Khanate, such as the blockade of Kerch in 1655, which prevented 100,000 Tatars from carrying out a large-scale raid into Ukraine and led to devastation of the Crimean settlements. The extent of the tragedy in Right-bank Ukraine can be exemplified by a report of a Polish officer of the time, describing the devastation:

I estimate that the number of infants alone who were found dead along the roads and in the castles reached 10,000. I ordered them to be buried in the fields and one grave alone contained over 270 bodies... All the infants were less than a year old since the older ones were driven off into captivity. The surviving peasants wander about in groups, bewailing their misfortune.

Mass killings, emigration, growth in the number of refugees and rise in crime caused terrible devastation in Ukrainian lands. According to demographic estimates, the population of the region of Bratslav during the 1660s had decreased in comparison to the latter third of the 16th century. There and in the regions of Volhynia and Galicia the population had decreased almost by half by the 1650s. War led to the mass migration of local population to Moldova and into the Left Bank and Sloboda Ukraine. In addition, thousand of people were captured as esir by Tatars: in 1648 the number of captives captured by the nomads was said to be so high, that one nobleman would be exchanged for a horse, and one Jew - for a handful of tobacco. Throughout late 1654 and until spring 1655 the Tatar Horde, then acting in coordination with Polish forces, devastated 270 towns and villages in Podolia. During their campaigns in autumn 1655, Muscovite and Tatar armies devastated wide strips of land between Kyiv, Lviv and Kamianets-Podilsky. Famine and disease were widespread from the very beginning of the uprising in 1648, contributed by large numbers of troops amassing in localized areas around Ukraine.

== In popular culture ==
The rebellion had a major effect on Poland and Ukraine. With Fire and Sword is a historical fiction novel, set in the 17th century in the Polish–Lithuanian Commonwealth during the Khmelnytsky Uprising.

With Fire and Sword is also a Polish historical drama film directed by Jerzy Hoffman. The film is based on the novel With Fire and Sword, the first part in Henryk Sienkiewicz's The Trilogy.

== See also ==
- List of battles of the Khmelnytsky Uprising
- History of the Polish–Lithuanian Commonwealth (1569–1648)#Cossacks and Cossack rebellions
- Ogniem i Mieczem
- Hussite Wars
- Wars of national liberation
- Russo-Polish War (1654–1667)
- Deluge (history)
- With Fire and Sword (film)
- Pereiaslav Agreement
