= Arendator =

Person who leased fixed assets

In the history of the Russian Empire, and Polish–Lithuanian Commonwealth, arendator (literally "lease holder") (Ukrainian: "Орендар" (Orendar), Russian: "Откупщик" (Otkupshchik)) was a person who leased fixed assets, such as land, mines, mills, inns, breweries, or distilleries, or of special rights, such as the right to collect customs duties, taxes, or the right to mint money, for example. Individuals trusted by state officials were often given such rights to collect rent or revenue and were allowed to keep a portion of the money in exchange for this service, sometimes as a reward for other services to the state. The practice is called "rent/revenue farming".

The 1913 Webster's dictionary gives the following definition:

||Ar`en*da"tor (?), n. [LL. arendator, arrendator, fr. arendare, arrendare, to pay rent, fr. arenda yearly rent; ad + renda, F. rente, E. rent. Cf. Arrentation and Rent.] In some provinces of Russia, one who farms the rents or revenues.

Many estates of absentee landlords in the Polish–Lithuanian Commonwealth during the 16–18th centuries were managed by arendators, many of whom were Jewish. This led to significant resentment and antisemitic violence during the Khmelnytsky Uprising (1648–1657).

This extremely lucrative fiscal practice was also common in tax collecting in medieval Spain and France. There were frequent problems with corruption. The practice continued in the Russian Empire until the late 19th century.

== See also ==
- Farm (revenue leasing)
