= Treaty of Radnot =

1656 quintipartite proposal to divide the Polish–Lithuanian Commonwealth

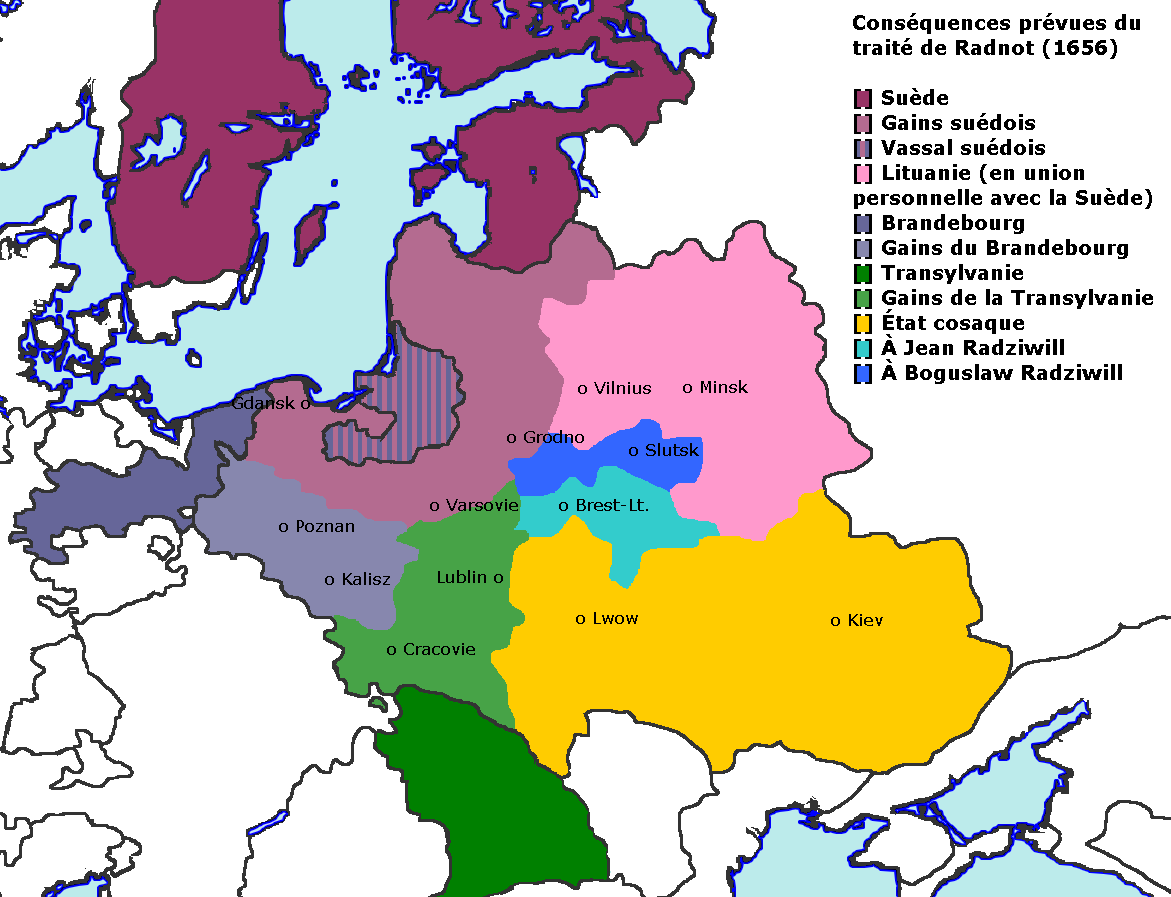
Partition of the Commonwealth according to the Treaty of Radnot and other agreements between Sweden and its allies by December 1656. Sweden Swedish gains Lithuania (in personal union with Sweden) Brandenburg Brandenburger gains Transylvania Transylvanian gains Cossack state to Janusz Radziwiłł to Bogusław Radziwiłł

The Treaty of Radnot was a bilateral treaty signed on 6 December 1656 during the Second Northern War in Radnot in Transylvania (now Iernut in Romania) between Charles X Gustav of the Swedish Empire and George II Rákóczi, Prince of Transylvania. Sometimes, a wider set of agreements concluded in December 1656 between Sweden and its allies is "collectively called the Treaty of Radnot".

Faced with strongly successful Polish resistance to the Swedish invasion, King Charles X Gustav suggested that his adversary be partitioned among Sweden and its allies. The treaty divided the Polish–Lithuanian Commonwealth between Sweden and Transylvania, and also reserved territories for the Cossack Hetmanate in modern Ukraine, and Lithuanian magnate Bogusław Radziwiłł in modern Belarus.

The treaty partially reiterated agreements Sweden had previously concluded with its other allies, and added new provisions for the remaining territories:

- Charles X Gustav of Sweden was to receive Royal Prussia, Kuyavia, northern Masovia, Samogitia, Courland and Inflanty. (Note: Article 5. '(...) ideo signanter Sacra Regia Majestas pro se, suis successoribus, et corona Sveciae integram Cujaviam, Borussiam, Cassubiam et Pomerelliam a Nowodwor, cum partibus illis, quae spectant ad latus Borussicum, ex Palatinatibus Plocensi et Mazoviensi cum latitudine citra flumen Bugi versus Varsaviam ad duo milliaria, totam Podlachiam: in Lithvania Samogitiam, districtum Kownensem, Wolkowiscensem, et Upitensem, item Braclawiensem, et in latere secundum Dunam fluvium ad duo milliaria a ripa, usque in Palatinatum Polocensem et Witepscensem citra flumen Dunam situm, cum latitudine duorum milliarium ab illa parte fluminis Dunae, versus amnem Vilia, Curlandiam, Semigalliam, Borussiae et Livoniae Ducatus (...).')
- Bogusław Radziwiłł was to receive the Nowogródek Voivodeship. (Note: Article 5. 'Pro principe Radzivilio Palatinatum Novogrodensem, cum aliis antehac ad ipsum spectantibus, ubicunque sitae sint, jure superioritatis possidendis, (...).')
- Frederick William, Elector of Brandenburg, as previously stipulated by the Treaty of Marienburg (25 June 1656 N.S.), was to receive the voivodeships of Poznań (Posen, Posnaniensis), Kalisz (Kalisch, Calissiensis), Sieradz (Siradiensis), and Łęczyca (Lancicz, Lanciciensis) in the Greater Poland Province. (Note: Article 5: 'Pro serenissimo Electore Brandeburgico Palatinatum Lanciciensem, Calissiensem, Posnaniensem, et Siradiensem, cum terra Viclunensi, prout ante hac inter Sacram Regiam Majestatem et Suam Serenitatem Electoralem fuerat pactum et conventum (...).')
- George II Rákóczi of Transylvania was to receive southern Polish territories, mostly the Lesser Poland Province (including Kraków) and the remainder of the Greater Poland Province, as well as the title "King of Poland".
- Sweden "had reserved Ukraine for the Cossacks, or whatever else may be agreed upon with them" in Article 6. (Note: Article 6: '(...) reservatas ditiones etiam pro Kozacis Ukrainam, aut quod alias ipsis adaccordari possit (...).') Its territory was not explicitly defined, except that it was to include everything of the Lesser Poland Province not claimed by Rákóczi. Article 7 revealed a disagreement between Transylvania and Sweden: Rákóczi desired the Western Bug as his eastern border, while Charles wanted to reserve "both banks of the Bug for a distance of two miles towards Warsaw, and all of Podlachia" (Note: Article 7. '(...) utramque Bugi ripam cum spacio duorum milliarium versus Varsaviam, et totam Podlachiam (...).') for the Cossacks, who desired to extend their territory up to the Vistula. (Note: As early as February 1649, Bohdan Khmelnytsky had demanded the Cossack Hetmanate to be extended as far as the Vistula in negotiations with the Commonwealth. Khmelnytsky's demand that the Hetmanate's territory be extended to the Vistula, while Swedish diplomats were hesitant to make that concession, even caused a temporary breakdown in Swedish–Ukrainian negotiations in late 1656. Under his successor Ivan Vyhovsky, in Article 3 of the Treaty of Korsun (16 October 1657 N.S.) between Sweden and the Cossack Hetmanate, Sweden would indeed promise the Zaporizhian Host territory up to the Vistula. In practice, the Cossack Hetmanate would never control Lviv again (except briefly in 1705 under Ivan Mazepa), let alone territories west of it. A large section of the Bug became the modern border between Poland and Ukraine in the 20th century.) However, the negotiators could not agree on this matter, so "that point has been reserved for future friendly negotiations". (Note: Article 7. '(...) ad futuras amicabiles tractatus ille punctus reservatus est'.)

One of the main results of the treaty was that George II Rákóczi invaded the Commonwealth in January 1657 with various allies, including the Cossacks. The changing geopolitical situation prevented the treaty from ever being fully implemented, as the Commonwealth recovered and repulsed the invaders. The treaty is seen as a precursor to the 18th-century partitions of the Polish–Lithuanian Commonwealth.

1891 copy of the treaty text in Latin

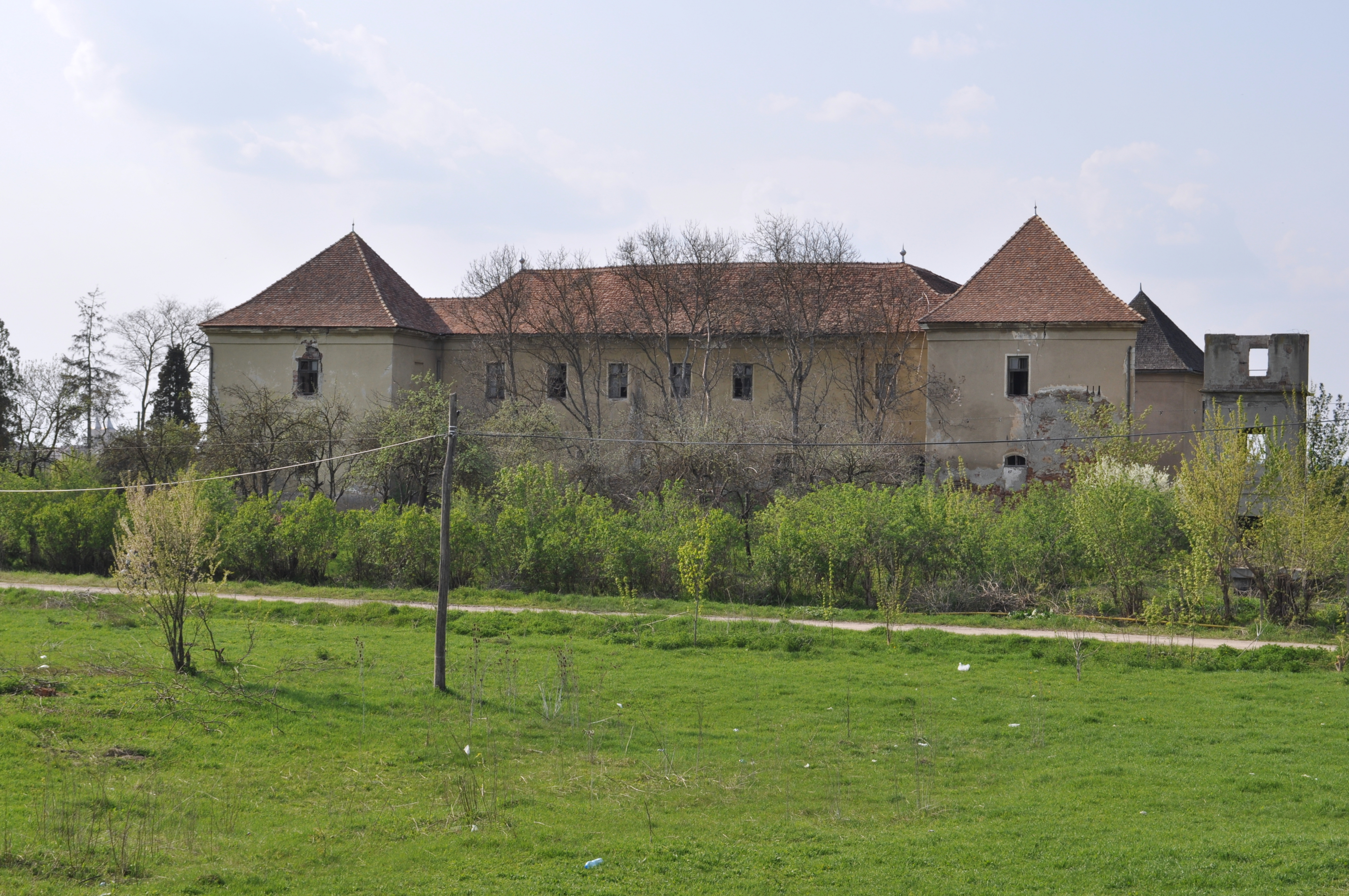
The Rákóczi Castle in Radnót

== Bibliography ==
- Robert I. Frost, After the Deluge: Poland-Lithuania and the Second Northern War, 1655-1660, Cambridge University Press, 2004, ISBN 0-521-54402-5, Google Print, p. 85
- Kohut, Zenon E. (2009). "Mazepa's Ukraine: Understanding Cossack Territorial Vistas". Harvard Ukrainian Studies. 31 (1/4). Harvard Ukrainian Research Institute: 1–28. ISSN 0363-5570. JSTOR 41756495.
- Sysyn, Frank (1991). "Reviewed Work: Hieronim Radziejowski: Studium Władzy i Opozycji by Adam Kersten". Harvard Ukrainian Studies. 15 (1/2). Harvard Ukrainian Research Institute: 211–217.
- William Young, International Politics and Warfare in the Age of Louis XIV and Peter the Great: A Guide to the Historical Literature, iUniverse, 2004, ISBN 0-595-32992-6, Google Print, p.421
- "wojny polsko-szwedzkie". Encyklopedia PWN (in Polish).
