= Battle of Berestechko =

1651 battle of the Khmelnytsky Uprising

- Part of the Khmelnytsky Uprising
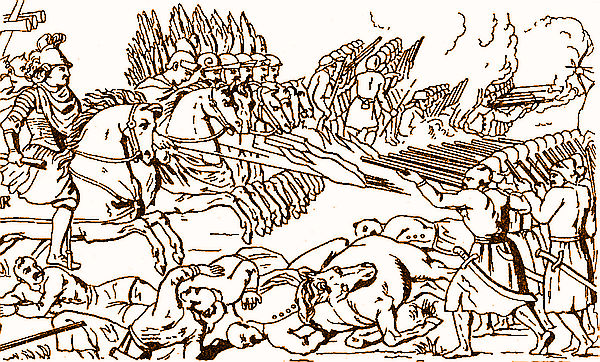
- Drawing of the Battle of Berestechko, based on a relief by Jean Thibaut
Date	28 June – 10 July 1651
Location	Berestechko, Volhynia, Polish–Lithuanian Commonwealth (modern-day Ukraine) 50°21′00″N 25°07′00″E
Result	Polish–Lithuanian victory

Belligerents
Cossack Hetmanate; Crimean Khanate (Note: Only until 30 June)	Polish–Lithuanian Commonwealth

Commanders and leaders
Zaporozhians: Bohdan Khmelnytsky; Ivan Bohun; Filon Dzhelaliy; Tatars: İslâm III Giray; Tugay Bey †	John II Casimir; Jeremi Wisniowiecki; Mikołaj Potocki; Marcin Kalinowski; Stefan Czarniecki; Stanisław Lanckoroński; Paweł Jan Sapieha

Strength
c. 100,000 – c. 200,000 total, including: Many thousands of peasants; 30,000–40,000 Crimean Tatars; 2,000 Don Cossacks; Several thousand Turks and Vlachs	c. 80,000 – c. 150,000 total, of which: 17,000 cavalry; 16,000 infantry; 56,000 levies; 40,000 attendants; 20,000 mercenaries

Casualties and losses
30,000–40,000; 3,000–4,000 killed	Unknown; 700 (on 1 July)

The Battle of Berestechko (28 June – 10 July 1651) (Note: Ukrainian: Битва під Берестечком; Polish: Bitwa pod Beresteczkiem) was fought between the Cossack Hetmanate and Crimean Khanate against the Polish–Lithuanian Commonwealth as a part of the Khmelnytsky Uprising. Near the site of the present-day city of Berestechko in Ukraine forces of the Zaporozhian Cossacks and Crimean Tatars under the command of Hetman Bohdan Khmelnytsky, Otaman Tymofiy Khmelnytsky, Colonels Ivan Bohun and Fylon Dzhalaliy with Khan İslâm III Giray and Tugay Bey, who was killed in the battle, were defeated by the Polish–Lithuanian Commonwealth's forces under the command of the Polish King John II Casimir, Prince Jeremi Wiśniowiecki, Hetmans Marcin Kalinowski and Stanisław Lanckoroński. It is considered to have been among the largest European land battles of the 17th century.

== Background ==
=== Local terrain ===
The battle took place in the Volhynian Voivodeship on a hilly plain south of the Styr River, in a lowland near the town of Berestechko. The Polish–Lithuanian camp was on the Styr River opposite Berestechko and faced south, towards the Zaporozhian Cossack positions about two kilometers away, with the right flank of the Cossacks covered by the Pliashivka (Pliashova) River and the left flank by Crimean Tatars. Battle formations of both armies expanded across a frontline reaching the length of 7-8 kilometers. The battlefield was flanked by marshes on one side and by a forest on the other.

== Opposing forces ==
=== Poles ===
The number of Polish troops is uncertain. One of the senior Polish commanders, Duke Bogusław Radziwiłł, wrote that the Crown Army had 80,000 soldiers, which included "40,000 regulars and 40,000 nobles of the levée en masse, accompanied by roughly the same number of various servants, footmen, and such." Some modern historians, such as Zbigniew Wójcik, Józef Gierowski, and Władysław Czapliński, have reduced this figure to 60,000–63,000 soldiers.

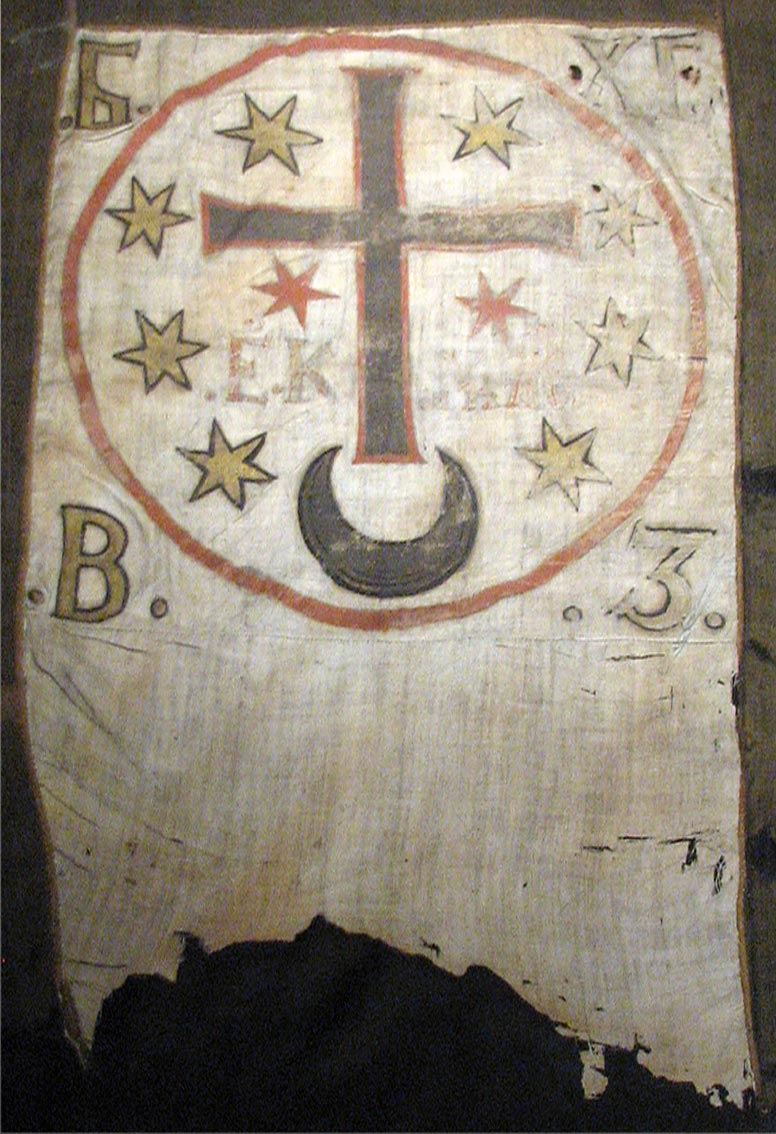
Bohdan Khmelnytsky's personal banner captured at Berestechko and now kept in Stockholm's Armémuseum

On 19 June 1651, the Crown Army numbered 14,844 Polish cavalry, 2,250 German-style cavalry, 11,900 German-style infantry and dragoons, 2,950 Hungarian-style infantry (haiduks), 1,550 Lithuanian volunteers, and 960 Lipka Tatars. A number of registered Cossacks remained loyal and participated in the battle on the Polish side. Many magnates brought in their large private armies. In addition, there was a huge militia force, of limited value, numbering 30,000 noblemen of the levée en masse.

=== Zaporozhians and Tatars ===
There is no reliable source on the number of Zaporozhian Cossack and Crimean Tatar troops. The possible estimates range from 90,000 to 130,000 men. The core of the Cossack forces at Berestechko consisted of 12 Registered Cossack regiments named after the towns they were stationed in. Listed below is the manpower of each regiment according to the 1649 Treaty of Zboriv.

Regiment	Colonel	Strength
Chyhyryn	Mykhailo Krysa	3,220
Cherkasy	Yakiv Voronchenko	2,990
Korsun	Ivan Hulyanytsky	3,470
Bila Tserkva	Mykhailo Hromyka	2,990
Uman	Yosyp Hlukh	2,977
Bratslav	Danylo Nechai	2,662
Vinnytsia	Ivan Bohun	2,050
Pereiaslav	Fedir Loboda	2,986
Kropyvna	Filon Dzhelaliy	1,993
Myrhorod	Matviy Hladky	3,009
Poltava	Martyn Pushkar	2,970
Pryluky	Tymofiy Nosach	1,996
Total		33,313

A total of 33,313 from the above. Additional 5 Cossack regiments (of Kyiv, Kaniv, Chernihiv, Nizhyn, Pavoloch) didn't participate in the battle being deployed mostly against the Lithuanian forces of Janusz Radziwiłł advancing on Kyiv. The Registered Cossack force was supported by a large number of Ukrainian peasants armed with scythes, flails and the likes which were rather undisciplined and organised poorly. The Crimean Tatar force is estimated to 25,000–30,000 men, though might be lower. There were also 2,000 Don Cossacks and a few thousand of Turks and Vlachs.

The Polish commanders were hoping to break the Cossack ranks with a charge of the Polish Winged Hussars, a tactic that had proven effective in many previous battles, including at Kircholm, and Kłuszyn (and which would later prove successful at the 1683 Battle of Vienna against the Turks).

The Cossack Army was well acquainted with this Polish style of war, having had much experience fighting against the Poles and alongside them. Their preferred tactic was to avoid an open field battle, and to fight from the cover of a huge fortified camp.

== Battle ==
=== First day (28 June): Indecisive skirmishes ===
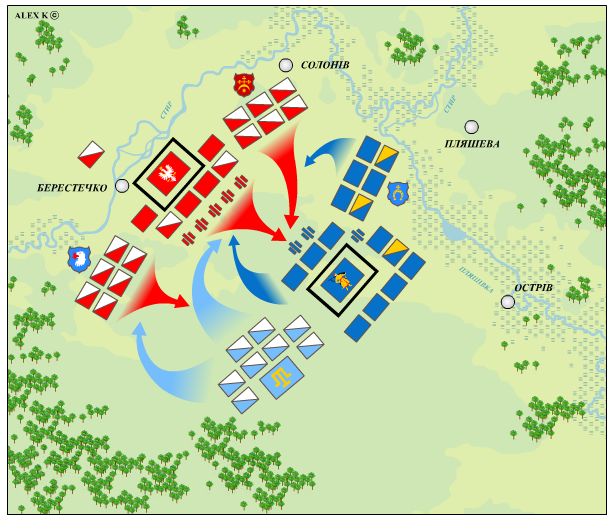
Positions and movements on the first two days of the battle

During the first day of skirmishes by the Tatar and Cossack vanguard regiments, the Poles were victorious since their army sustained that first attack cheerfully and in high spirits. 2,000 Polish cavalry (one regiment under the command of Aleksander Koniecpolski, supported by Jerzy Lubomirski, six pancern cavalry companies of Jeremi Wiśniowiecki and Winged Hussars under the command of Stefan Czarniecki) repulsed the Crimean Tatars, who suffered heavy losses. All in all, the first day of the battle failed to bring a decisive advantage to any of the sides.

=== Second day (29 June): Costly Polish assault ===
The Poles, encouraged by their success on the first day, deployed all their available cavalry against the main Tatar horde and Cossack vanguard regiments. The Polish infantry and artillery remained in camp and did not support the cavalry. This time, Tatar cavalry gained the upper hand, pushing the Poles back to their camp but were then barely repelled by heavy fire from the Polish infantry and artillery.The Poles lost 300 szlachta, including many officers of caliber, and the escort troop of Hetman Mikołaj Potocki. During the second day of the battle, the rebels were victorious, although the Tatars, too, were unpleasantly surprised by the determination and endurance of the Polish army in both battles, and their morale was damaged by heavy losses suffered in combat.

=== Third day (30 June): Flight of the Tatars ===
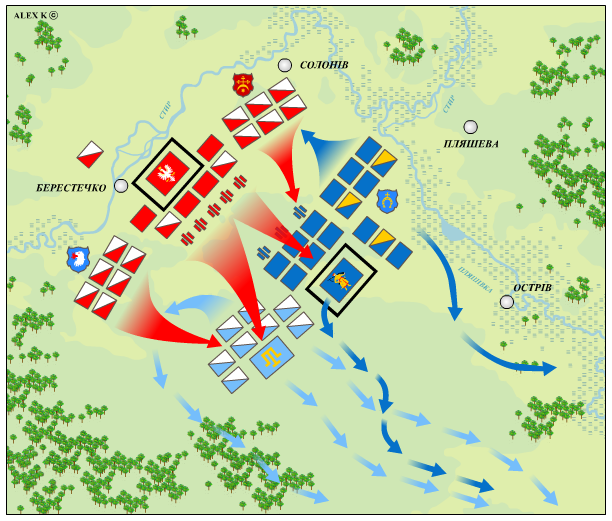
Counterattack by the Poles against the Zaporozhian Cossacks and Crimean Tatars

At a night council, the king insisted, on engaging the enemy in a decisive battle the next day, Friday, 30 June. The first half of the day didn't see any major fighting due to heavy mist covering the battlefield. Only in the afternoon did the Crown Army appear out of the morning mist in full strength, but only the Tatars engaged in skirmishes, being met by the Polish artillery. The Cossack defences consisted of two fortified camps, a larger for the registered Cossacks and a smaller for the peasant militia, both protected by 10 lines of chained wagons. At 3 p.m. Duke Jeremi Wiśniowiecki led a successful charge of 18 cavalry companies against the right wing of the Cossack-Tatar armies; the cavalry attack was a success: it broke up the rows of Cossack infantry and the wagons moving in corral formation. However the Cossacks regrouped, pushed the Polish cavalry out of the camp and advanced further with the help of the Tatars. The left flank of the Polish army started to retreat when the King reinforced it with all German mercenaries under command of Colonel Houwaldt who repulsed the attack and drove the Tatars from the field.

During the fighting, a Polish nobleman called Otwinowski noticed the Tatar Khan's standard, and Polish artillery was directed to fire at it. The Khan's brother Amurat was wounded mortally along with Tugay Bey, and his brother-in-law Mehmet Giray was killed. With the battle already turning against them, the Tatar forces panicked, abandoning the Khan's camp, and fled the battlefield leaving most of their belongings behind. Khmelnytsky and Vyhovsky with a few Cossacks chased the Khan, attempting to bring him with his force back, but were taken hostage to be released when the battle was over. A heavy rain started which complicated cavalry operations. With the Tatar cavalry gone, the Cossacks moved their wagons in the night to a better defensive position closer to the Pliashivka river, where they dug trenches and constructed walls, creating a makeshift fortress.

=== Siege of the Cossack camp (30 June–10 July) ===
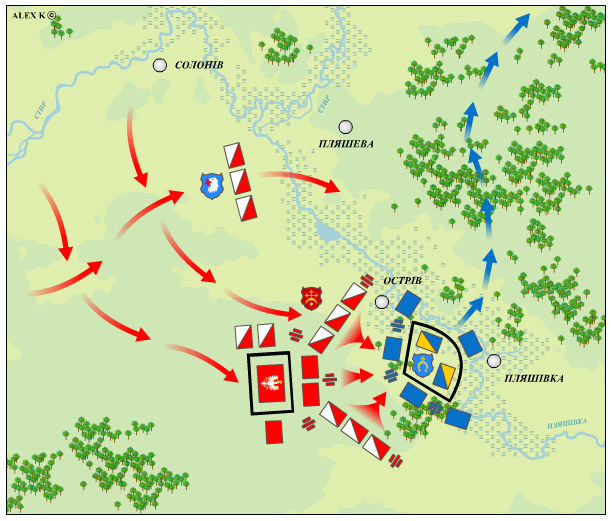
Final stage of the battle and retreat of Cossack Hetmanate's forces

The Crown Army and Cossack camp exchanged artillery fire for ten days while both sides built fortifications. The Poles tried to blockade the camp. Leaderless without Bohdan Khmelnytsky, the Cossacks were commanded by Colonel Fylon Dzhalaliy who was replaced by Ivan Bohun on 9 July. Other accounts state the commander was Matviy Hladky. The Cossack morale was decreasing and desertions started to the other river side, though they maintained a high rate of artillery fire and made occasional sorties. When the offered terms for surrender were rejected, the Poles prepared to dam the Pliashivka River so as to flood the Cossack camp. Stanisław Lanckoroński with a cavalry force of 2,000 moved across the river on 9 July to complete the encirclement of the Cossacks. When they found out about the Polish advance, Bohun called for a council with other leaders of the registered Cossacks on further actions. However, none of the peasant militia was invited to the council. The Cossacks built three bridges and Bohun led 2,000 cavalry with two cannons to the other side of the river by the morning of 10 July to attack Lanckoroński. The uninformed peasants, thinking they were abandoned, started to panic and flee across the river.

Lanckoroński didn't expect a large movement in his direction and retreated. Bohun returned to the camp and tried to restore order, but in vain. The main Polish force observed the disorder, but didn't launch an attack on the Cossack camp immediately thinking of a trap. They assaulted eventually, breached the defences and made their way to the river crossing. A few Cossack regiments managed to retreat in order though. Some Cossacks drowned, but archaeological excavations on the river crossing site revealed about a hundred Cossack human remains all showing damage from melee weapons which suggested heavy fighting. A rearguard of 200 to 300 Cossacks heroically protected the river crossing; all of them were killed in battle rejecting surrender offers. Khmelnytsky's tent was captured intact, with all his belongings, which included two banners, one received from John II Casimir's 1649 commission and one from Wladyslaw IV in 1646.

== Casualties ==
Although it was difficult to estimate how many Cossacks and peasants were killed in the retreat, Piasecki and Brzostowski, who participated in the battle, mentioned 3,000 killed. The Tsar's ambassador podyachy Bogdanov in his report to Moscow mentioned 4,000 killed. Most Cossack artillery pieces were either lost to the Poles or drowned in the marshes. Many spoils were collected in the Cossack camp including the army treasury of 30,000 talers.

== Aftermath ==
As the battle ended, King John Casimir made the error of not pressing even harder the pursuit of the fleeing Cossacks, "the first several days following ... defeat of the enemy were so blatantly wasted" but there "was the unwillingness of the nobility's levée en masse to proceed into Ukraine" plus "rainy weather and a lack of food and fodder, coupled with epidemics and diseases that were becoming active in the army, were generally undercutting any energy for war". The "king left the whole army to Potocki" on 17 July 1651, and returned "to Warsaw to celebrate his victories over the Cossacks".After making promises of a pecuniary nature, Hetman Bohdan Khmelnytsky was soon released by the Tatar Khan İslâm III Giray He was then able to reassemble the Zaporozhian Host, which was able to present a substantial army to confront the Poles at the Battle of Bila Tserkva (1651). Poland and "the bulk of the rebels make peace in the Treaty of Bila Tserkva" on 28 September 1651, which "reduces the number of registered Cossacks from 40,000 to 20,000 and deprives them of the right to settle in or control various provinces of Ukraine previously allowed to them under the Treaty of Zboriv". The Ukrainian revolt, far from ending, would continue for several more years under Khmelnytsky and be ultimately victorious.

According to Ukrainian historian Natalia Yakovenko, the battle represented a turning point, during which the uprising led by Khmelnytsky transformed from a civil war inside of the Commonwealth into a full-scale Polish-Ukrainian war.

== Legacy ==
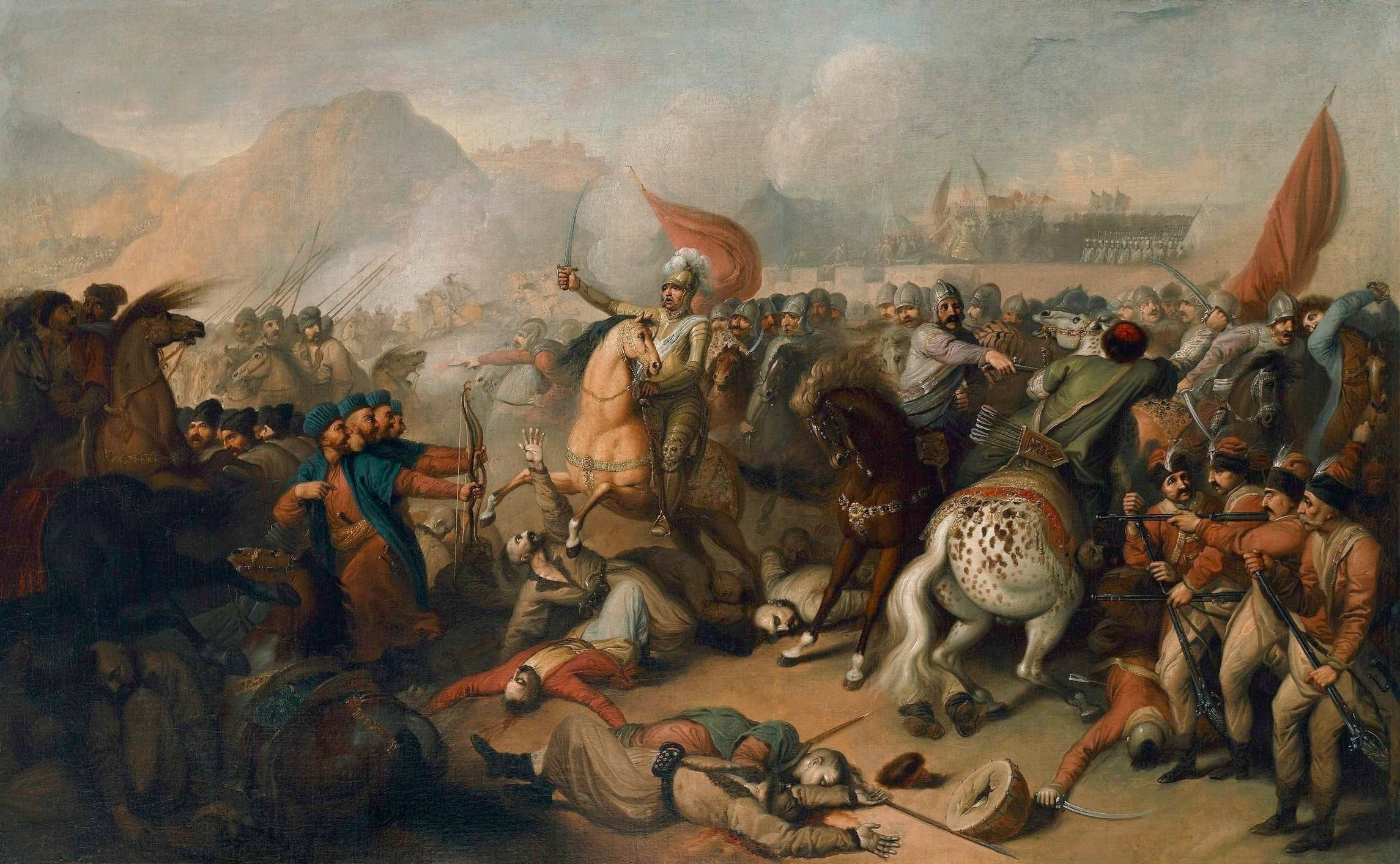
18th century depiction of the battle by Franciszek Smuglewicz

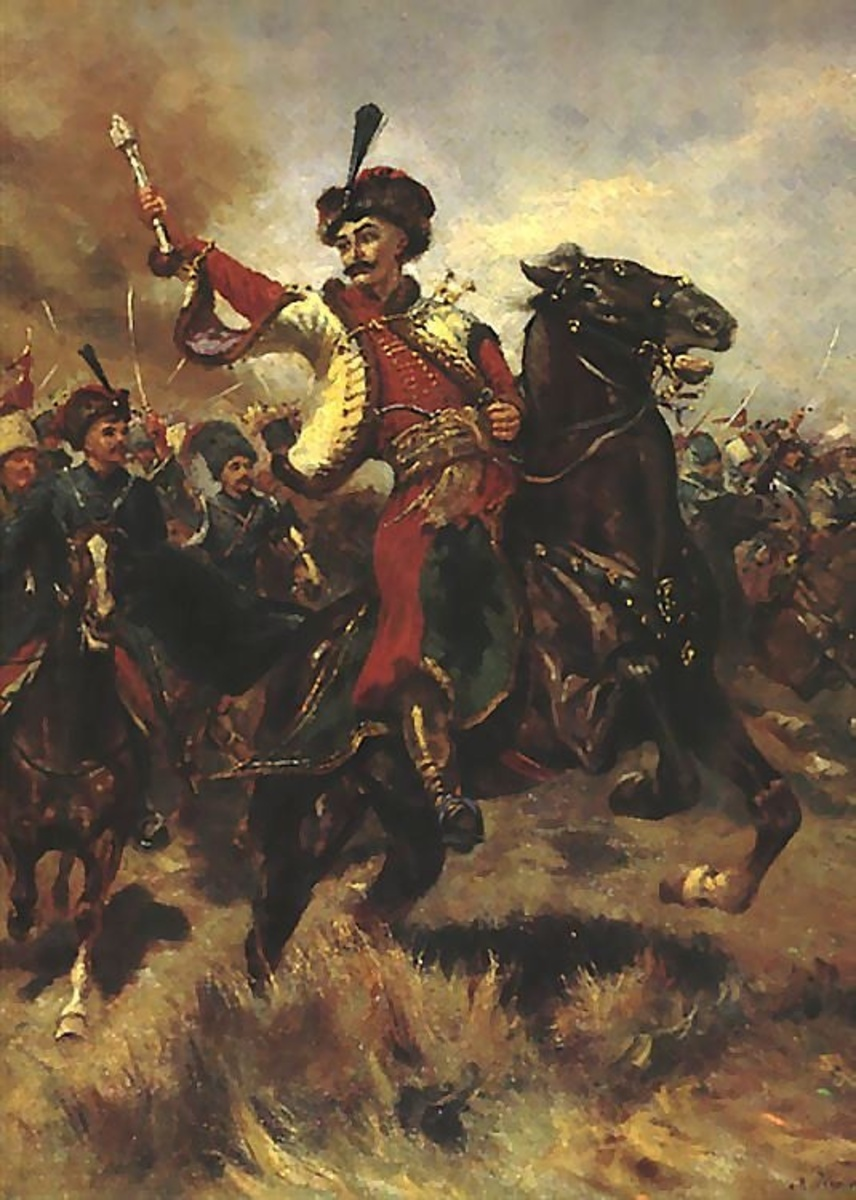
Ivan Bohun at the Battle of Berestechko, a 1900 painting by Mykola Ivasiuk

=== In literature ===
Samuel Twardowski's narrative poem, The Civil War, describes the setting for the battle along the Styr River:

There is a little town on it,
In the middle of Volhynia, called Berestechko,
Belonging to the Leszczynski family, that was not as famous in the past
As it has now become – both ancient Cannae
And Khotyn are far outshone by it, because as many heads here
Our eyes have seen as at Thermopylae
Or Marathon they counted, although there the whole strength
Of Europe and Asia had come together.
Since our arrival – hilly roads
And steep slopes, until open
Meadows unfold near the Styr's
Low banks. It was pleasant to look from the south
At the pyramid of the Pronskis and the groves that are green
In winter always. And to th east there lies as if a natural
Field for a camp – and there it was indeed placed
Later, but first – this was pondered for a long time.

In 1966 Ukrainian poetess Lina Kostenko composed a novel in verse dedicated to the Battle of Berestechko, which was finally published in 1999.

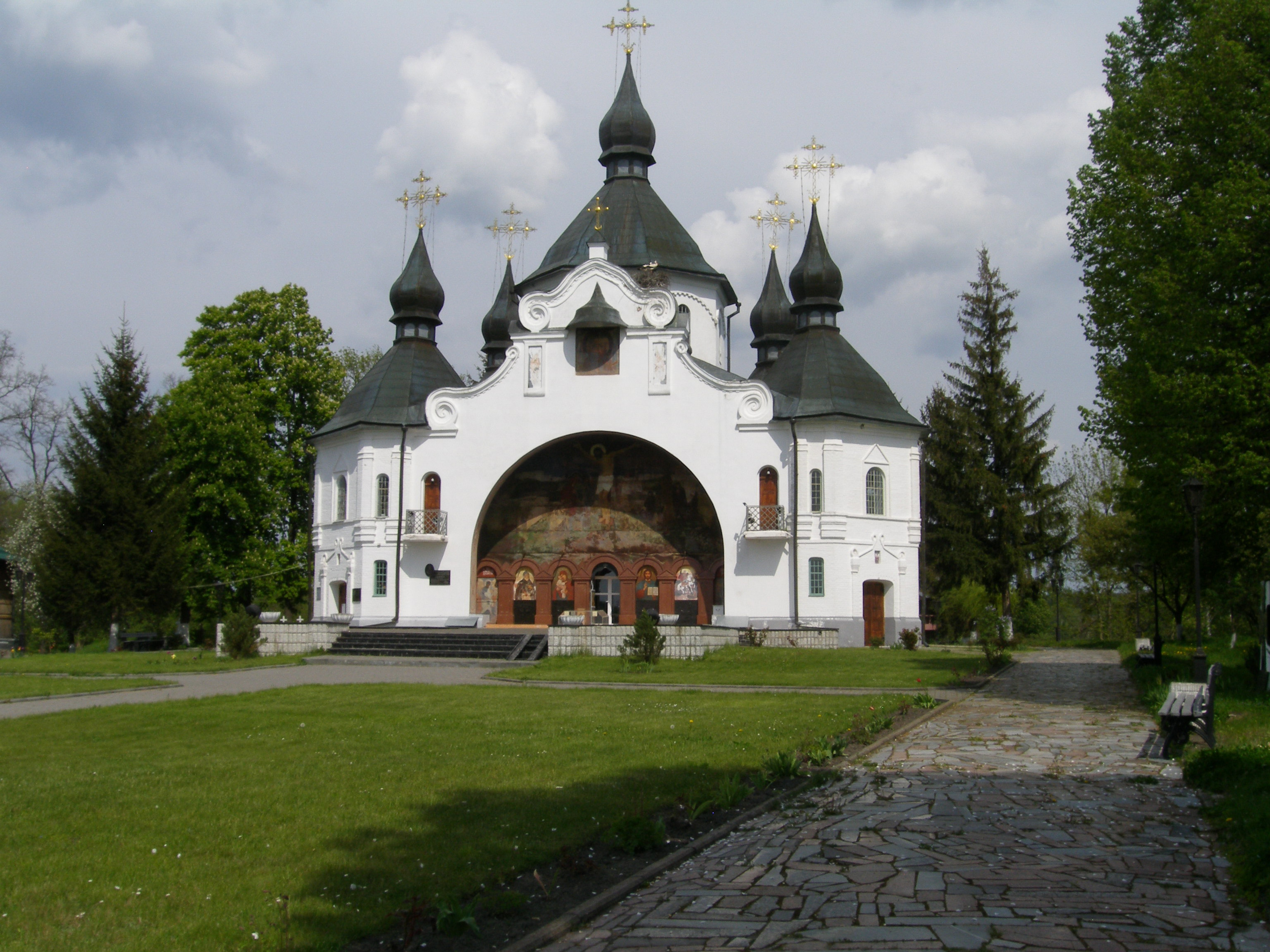
Saint George's Church constructed near the site of the battle

=== Commemoration ===
In 1908-1910 religious services commemorating the battle were organized in Berestechko by the Orthodox Church and Union of the Russian People, with tens of thousands of pilgrims visiting the site.

In 1912-1914 a memorial church dedicated to Saint George was built in the vicinity of Berestechko to honour Cossacks fallen in the battle. The building was created in Cossack Baroque style, with interior frescoes designed by Ukrainian painter Ivan Yizhakevych. The construction of the church was sponsored through donations by Orthodox faithful and clergymen from Volhynia, as well as by Kuban, Don and Orenburg Cossack Hosts.

As part of the opening ceremony, a solemn parade with the participation of Don Cossack troops was organized, and a 14-ton bell was installed on the belfry of the memorial church. In honour of the event, 300 Ukrainian Cossacks who had perished in the battle were awarded with Crosses of St. George.

Despite the participation of Russian monarchist organizations in its creation, the monument in Berestechko was positively evaluated by members of the Ukrainian national movement such as Dmytro Doroshenko and Ivan Ohienko. After the fall of Tsarism Orthodox memorial services continued at the site. During the 1930s and 1940s Organization of Ukrainian Nationalists took a leading role in organizing patriotic manifestations in memory of the battle.

The Battle of Berestechko is commemorated on the Tomb of the Unknown Soldier, Warsaw, with the inscription "BERESTECZKO 28-30 VI 1651".

In 1967 a museum dedicated to the battle was established on the premises of a former monastery near the village of Pliasheva. In 2009 the museum received the status of a national historical reserve.

== Gallery ==
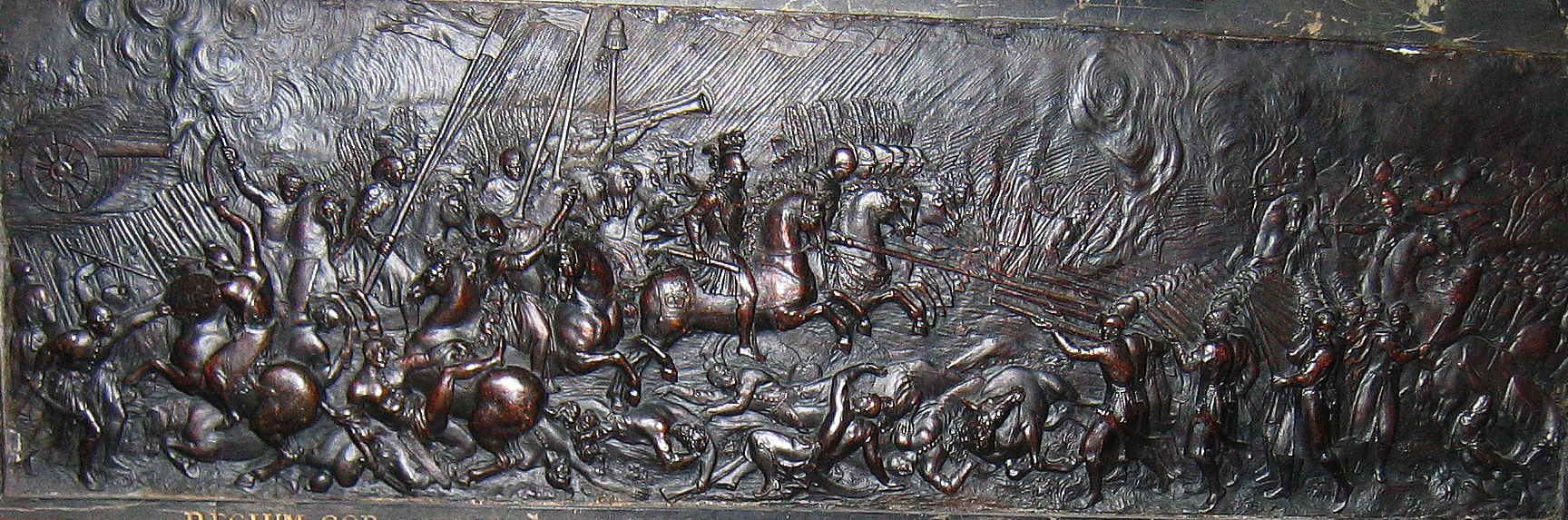
Relief of the battle by Jean Thibaut, showing John II Casimir Vasa leading Polish cavalry against Cossack positions

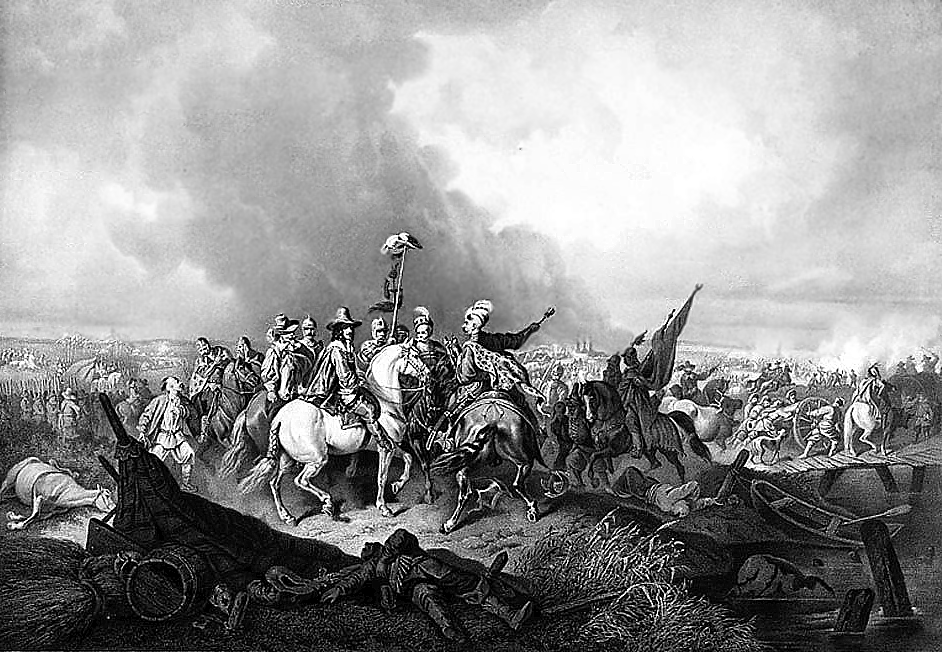
The Battle of Beresteczko, 1651 by Władysław Witkowski

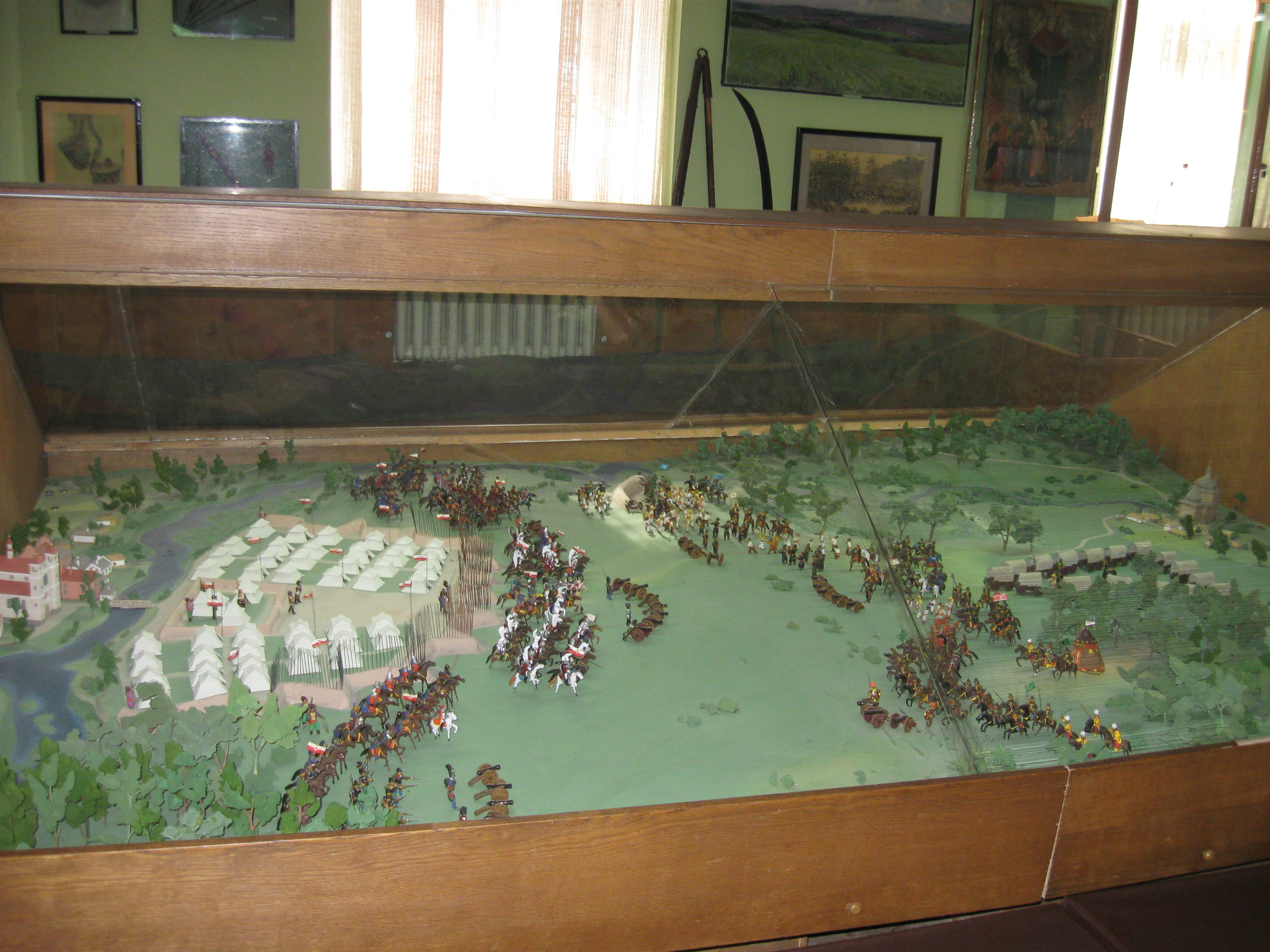
A miniature model of the battle from Rivne regional museum

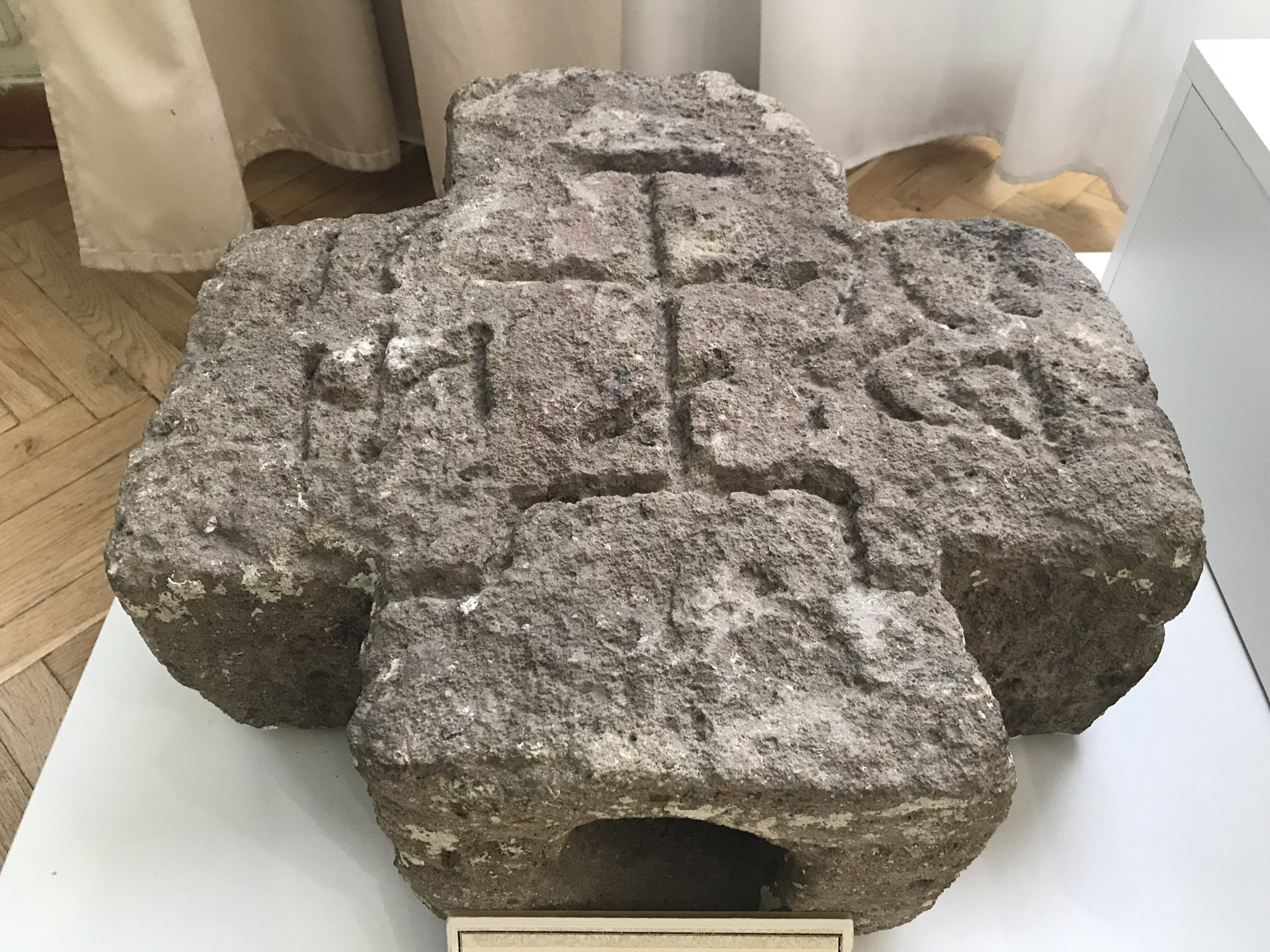
An Orthodox gravestone discovered at the site of the battle

== Bibliography ==
- Fedevych, Klymentiy (2017). За Віру, Царя і Кобзаря. Малоросійські монархісти і український національний рух (1905—1917 роки) [For Faith, Tsar and Kobzar: Little Russian Monarchists and the Ukrainian National Movement (1905-1917)] (in Ukrainian). Krytyka. p. 168. ISBN 9789662789058.
- Hrushevsky, Mykhailo (2004). History of Ukraine-Rus, Volume Nine, Book One, "The Cossack Age, 1650–1653". Toronto: Canadian Institute of Ukrainian Studies. ISBN 1895571227.
- Subtelny, Orest (2009). Ukraine: A History, Fourth Edition. University of Toronto Press. ISBN 978-1-4426-9728-7.
- Svieshnikov, Ihor (1992). Битва під Берестечком [The Battle of Berestechko] (in Ukrainian). ISBN 5832600053.
- Yakovenko, Natalia (2006). An Outline History of Medieval and Early Modern Ukraine. Krytyka. ISBN 9667679829.
