= Battle of Kopychyntsi =

1651 battle

- Part of the Khmelnytsky Uprising
| Date | 12 May 1651 |
| Location | Kopychyntsi, Ruthenian Voivodeship, Polish–Lithuanian Commonwealth |
| Result | Polish–Lithuanian victory |

Belligerents
| Cossack Hetmanate; Crimean Khanate | Polish–Lithuanian Commonwealth |

Commanders and leaders
| Demko Lyzovets; Fylon Dzhalaliy; Semen Savych | Marcin Kalinowski; Marek Sobieski; Aleksander Koniecpolski |

Strength
| 40,000 Zaporozhian Cossacks and Crimean Tatars | 12,000 Polish–Lithuanian hussars, cavalry and infantry |

Casualties and losses
| A few thousand | 6,000 killed and wounded |

The Battle of Kopychyntsi (Ukrainian: Битва під Копичинцями, Polish: Bitwa pod Kopyczyńcami; 12 May 1651) was fought between the Cossack Hetmanate and Crimean Khanate against the Polish–Lithuanian Commonwealth as a part of the Khmelnytsky Uprising. Near the site of the present-day city of Kopychyntsi in Ukraine, a forces of the Zaporozhian Cossacks under the command of Osavul Demko Lyzovets, Colonels Fylon Dzhalaliy and Semen Savych was defeated by the Polish–Lithuanian Commonwealth's forces under the command of Hetman Marcin Kalinowski, Noblemans Marek Sobieski and Aleksander Koniecpolski.

In January 1651, the Zaporozhian Cossacks under the command of Hetman Bohdan Khmelnytsky launched an attack on the Bratslav Voivodeship of the Polish–Lithuanian Commonwealth and violated the Treaty of Zboriv which was signed on 18 August 1649. The Crown Army led by Hetman Marcin Kalinowski came against them and starting a military campaign which lasted until September 1651, then the Treaty of Bila Tserkva was signed. After the Polish–Lithuanian victory in the Battle of Krasne in 20–23 February 1651, the Poles and Lithuanians forces were able to advance and capture some Cossack fortresses in the Bratslav Regiment. At the beginning of 1651, the Siege of Vinnytsia in 11–12 March 1651 began, after which the Poles and Lithuanians were forced to retreat and lost against the Zaporozhian Cossacks. Hetman Marcin Kalinowski received an order from the Polish King John II Casimir to unite with the Crown Army forces numbered around 12,000 men in Sokal. Meanwhile, Hetman Bohdan Khmelnytsky set off with numbered around 80,000 forces of the Cossacks and Tatars in Ternopil, while a forces of the Zaporozhian Cossacks and Crimean Tatars numbered around 40,000 men led by Osavul Demko Lyzovets and Colonels Fylon Dzhalaliy and Semen Savych set out to catch up with the Crown Army. Meanwhile, famine began in the Polish–Lithuanian Commonwealth's forces.

On 10 May 1651, a forces of the Zaporozhian Cossacks and Crimean Tatars crossed the Seret River and waited for the arrival of Hetman Bohdan Khmelnytsky's forces, which didn't arrived. Then they moved to Kamianets. Not finding the Crown Army there, Fylon Dzhalaliy started a siege of the city, Demko Lyzovets and Semen Savych moved on in pursuit of the Polish–Lithuanian Commonwealth's forces. They caught up with them on 12 May 1651 near Kopychyntsi, where the battle took place.

A forces of the Cossack Hetmanate and Crimean Khanate were numbered around 40,000 men against the forces of the Polish–Lithuanian Commonwealth which was numbered around 12,000 men.

Hetman Marcin Kalinowski, who was a commander of the battle, he divided in 3 parts of his forces, 2 of which he ambushed with the commanders Marek Sobieski and Aleksander Koniecpolski, in this way they claimed victory and defeated a forces of the Zaporozhian Cossacks and Crimean Tatars which was outnumbered.
