= Battle of Krasne =

1651 battle

- Part of the Khmelnytsky Uprising
Date	20–23 February 1651
Location	Krasne, Bratslav Regiment, Cossack Hetmanate
Result	Polish–Lithuanian victory

Belligerents
Polish–Lithuanian Commonwealth	Cossack Hetmanate

Commanders and leaders
Marcin Kalinowski; Stanisław Lanckoroński	Danylo Nechay †; Hryhoriy Kryvenko

Strength
10,000–12,000 Polish–Lithuanian hussars, cavalry and infantry	12,000 Zaporozhian Cossacks

Casualties and losses
Unknown	8,000–10,000

The Battle of Krasne or the Defense of Krasne (Ukrainian: Битва під Красною, Красненська оборона; Polish: Bitwa pod Krasnem, Obrona Krasny; 20–23 February 1651) was fought between the Polish–Lithuanian Commonwealth against the Cossack Hetmanate as a part of the Khmelnytsky Uprising. Near the site of the present-day village of Krasne in Ukraine, the Polish–Lithuanian Commonwealth's forces under the command of Hetmans Marcin Kalinowski and Stanisław Lanckoroński attacked and defeated a forces of the Zaporozhian Cossacks under the command of Colonel Danylo Nechay, who was killed in the battle and Hryhoriy Kryvenko.

The Cossack Hetmanate violated the Treaty of Zboriv which was signed on 18 August 1649 and attacked the Bratslav Voivodeship of the Polish–Lithuanian Commonwealth in January 1651, then the Crown Army started a military campaign against the Zaporozhian Cossacks and Crimean Tatars which lasted until 28 September 1651, then the Polish–Lithuanian Commonwealth was defeated by the Cossack Hetmanate and Crimean Khanate in the Battle of Bila Tserkva and was signed the Treaty of Bila Tserkva after the battle. Colonel Danylo Nechay ordered his troops to gather in the village of Krasne on the border territories with the Cossack Hetmanate and Polish–Lithuanian Commonwealth in the Bratslav Regiment to defend the castle and village from the Crown Army.

In 20–23 February 1651, the Polish–Lithuanian Commonwealth's forces numbered around 12,000–20,000 troops crossed the border of the Cossack Hetmanate and approached Krasne. The Ukrainian castle guards mistook the Crown Army as a Zaporozhian Cossacks and let them inside. The Crown Army entered into the village and a fierce battle began between the two sides. The Poles and Lithuanians began to retreat under the strong onslaught of the Zaporozhian Cossacks numbered around 3,000 troops, but at the same time the main forces of the Polish–Lithuanian Commonwealth approached. The battle turned into a massacre; defenders of the castle, civilian people like men, women and children were brutally killed by the forces of the Polish–Lithuanian Commonwealth, the entire village was destroyed and burned.

After this success, Hetmans Marcin Kalinowski and Stanislaw Lanckoroński marched deeper into Podolia, seizing several towns, such as Sharhorod, Yampil and Chernivtsi. After losing a siege against the Zaporozhian Cossacks in Vinnytsia in 11–12 March 1651, the Crown Army had to retreat back to Volhynia.

== Bibliography ==
- Władysław Andrzej Serczyk: Na płonącej Ukrainie. Dzieje Kozaczyzny 1648–1651. Warszawa: Książka i Wiedza, 1998, p. 328-329. ISBN 83-05-12969-1.
- Maciej Franz: Wojskowość Kozaczyzny Zaporoskiej w XVI-XVII wieku. Geneza i charakter. Toruń: Adam Marszałek, 2004, p. 222. ISBN 83-73-22803-9.
