= Irkliiv Regiment =

Irkliiv Regiment Іркліївський полк
- Coat of Arms
- Active: 1648-1649; 1658-1663
- Country: Cossack Hetmanate
- Type: Cossack Regiment
- Size: 9 sotnias (1648-1649); 8 sotnias (1658-1663)
- Garrison/HQ: Irkliiv, Ukraine
- Engagements: Khmelnytsky Uprising

The Irkliiv Regiment (Ukrainian: Іркліївський полк, romanized: Irkliivskyi polk) was one the territorial-administrative subdivisions of the Cossack Hetmanate. The regiment's capital was the city of Irkliiv, now a village in Cherkasy Oblast of central Ukraine.

In 1648, during Khmelnytsky Uprising, Regiment was raised from the Irkliiv sotnia of the Pereiaslav Regiment. Colonel Mykhailo Teliuchenko became the first commander. On 16 October 1649 Irkliiv and neighboring part of Lubny Regiment were merged to form Kropyvna Regiment. Other sotnias were absorbed into Chyhyryn Regiment and Cherkasy Regiment.

Hetman Ivan Vyhovsky disbanded Kropyvna Regiment in 1658 after death of colonel Filon Dzhelaliy. The regiments sotnias were all transferred to recreated Irkliiv Regiment and Lubny Regiment. Matvii Pankevych became the new regiments colonel. When the regiment was disbanded again in 1663, its sotnias went to neighbouring Pereiaslav Regiment, Pryluky Regiment and Lubny Regiment.

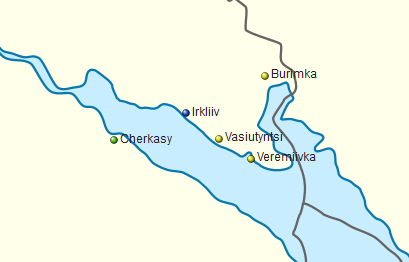
Irkliiv regiment sotnias location (1648-1649)

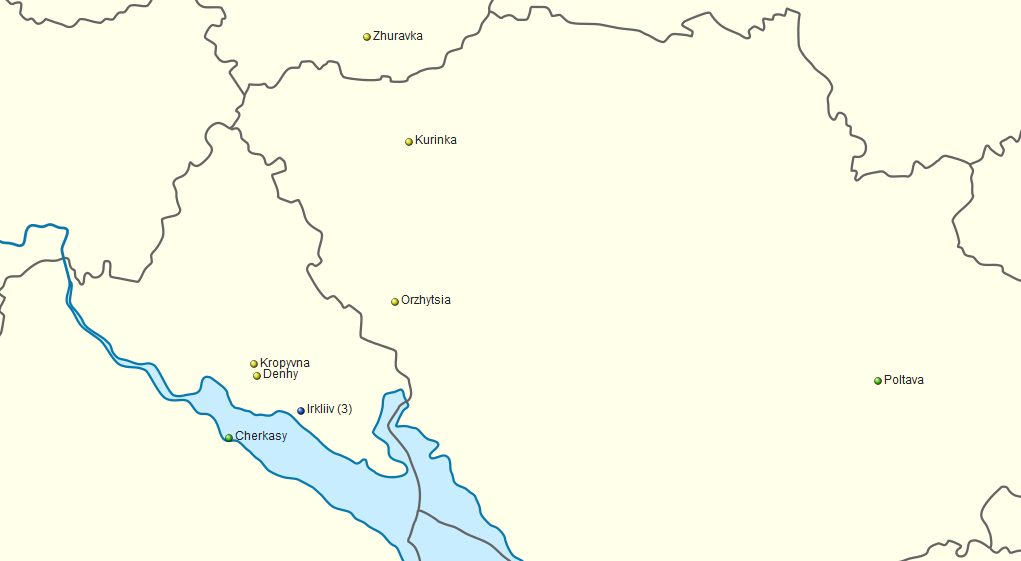
Irkliiv regiment sotnias location (1658-1663)

== Structure ==
The regiment comprised 5 sotnias during 1648-1649:

- Irkliiv
- Veremiivka
- Vasiutyntsi
- Burimka
- Mali Kanivtsi

The regiment comprised 8 sotnias during 1658-1663:

- Denhy
- Zhuravka
- Irkliiv 1st
- Irkliiv 2nd
- Irkliiv 3rd
- Kropyvna
- Kurinka
- Orzhytsia

== Commanders ==
- Mykhailo Teliuchenko 1648-1649
- Matvii Pankevych (Papkevych, Papievych) 1658-Mid 1663

== Sources ==
- Заруба, Віктор (2007), Адміністративно-територіальний устрій та адміністрація Війська Запорозького у 1648-1782 рр. [Administrative-territorial structure and administration of the Zaporizhzhya Army in 1648-1782.] (in Ukrainian), Dnipro: Lira, ISBN 978-966-383-095-7
- Bodyansky, Osip (1974), РЕЕСТРА ВСЕГО ВОЙСКА ЗАПОРОЖСКАГО ПОСЛѢ ЗБОРОВСКАГО ДОГОВОРА [Register of all Zaporozhian Host after Treaty of Zboriv] (in Russian), Moscow: Imperial Moscow University
- Hrushevsky, Mykhailo (2015), Том 10. Книга 1: Історичні студії та розвідки (1924— 1930) [Volume 10. Book 1: Historical studies and investigations (1924—1930)] (in Ukrainian), Lviv: Svit, ISBN 978-966-603-223-5
