= House of Kalinowski =

Polish noble family

Kalinowski
- Kalinowa
- Origin: Polish, Ruthenian
- Members: Marcin Kalinowski
- Connected families: Potocki

The House of Kalinowski was a notable Polish noble family that belonged to a limited and small circle of Magnates of Poland and Lithuania.

== History ==
Like many other noble families of the Polish-Lithuanian Commonwealth, they played a prominent role in Polish, and to a lesser extent, in Belarusian history. They were descended from Andrzej Kalinowski (1465 – 1531) and used the Kalinowa coat of arms. On 17 August 1818, the family was awarded the title of Count in the Austrian Empire. This family lives to this day in Poland.

== Notable members ==
- Marcin Kalinowski (ca 1605 - 1652)
- Konstanty Kalinowski (2 February 1838 – 22 March 1864)
- Victor Otan Kalinowski (April 21, 1833 – November 6, 1862)

== Notable people with the same surname, but not part of that family ==
- Raphael Kalinowski (September 1, 1835, Vilna - November 15, 1907, Wadowice)

== Coat of arms ==
The family used the Kalinowa Coat of Arms.

Coat of Arms of Counts Kalinowski

== See also ==
- Czernihów Voivodeship
- Lucio Bini
- Albin Dunajewski
- Ostrołęka
