= Attendant =

Attendant or attendance may refer to:

- Car attendant, a railroad employee
- Flight attendant, flight crew employed to ensure the safety and comfort of the passengers
- Museum attendant
- Toilet attendant, maintains standards in a toilet and collects any usage fees
- Parking attendant
- Sports attendance
- Servant
- The operator of a telephone Attendant console
- Attendance, the attending of an obligation or event

== See also ==
- Attention (disambiguation)
