= 13th National Guard Battalion =

13th Separate Battalion
- 13-й окремий батальйон НГ (Ukrainian)
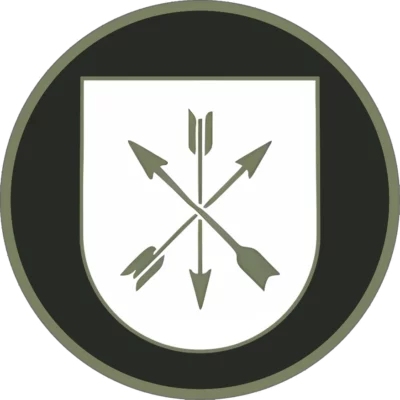
- Battalion Insignia
- Founded: 1992
- Country: Ukraine
- Allegiance: Ministry of Internal Affairs
- Branch: National Guard of Ukraine
- Type: Battalion
- Role: Multipurpose
- Part of: 40th Danylo Nechai Regiment
- Garrison/HQ: Khmelnytskyi and Kamianets-Podilskyi
- Nickname: Ravens
- Engagements: Russo-Ukrainian war: War in Donbas; Russian invasion of Ukraine

Commanders
- Current commander: Colonel Chernousov Volodymyr Volodymyrovych

The 13th Separate National Guard Battalion is a battalion of the 40th Regiment of the National Guard of Ukraine tasked with the protection of Ukrainian territorial integrity, maintenance of public order and escorting convicts during court proceedings. Its garrisons are located in Khmelnytskyi and Kamianets-Podilskyi.

== History ==
It was established on 31 October 1992, on the basis of a battalion of the 481st Convoy Regiment in Vinnytsia.

On 23 December 1998, a special patrol company was established in the battalion and it was transferred to the Internal Troops of Ukraine.

Since 1999, the battalion has been stationed in Khmelnytskyi and carries out tasks related to the protection of Ukrainian territorial integrity, public order in Khmelnytskyi and Kamianets-Podilskyi and escorting convicts during court proceedings.

In 2014 it was transferred to the National Guard of Ukraine and after the start of the War in Donbass, it was deployed first to Luhansk Oblast to defend the Luhansk Airport and then saw heavy combat deployment during the Battle of Mariupol with over a hundred servicemen being deployed.

Following the Russian invasion of Ukraine, the battalion has been deployed to the frontlines and saw combat against Russian forces.

== Structure ==
The structure of the battalion is as follows:

- 1st Rifle Company
- 2nd Rifle Company
- 1st Patrol Company (Khmelnytskyi)
- 2nd Patrol Company (Kamyanets-Podilskyi)
- Canine Platoon

== Commanders ==
- Major Andrii Martyniuk (?-2017)
- Colonel Bereznyuk Roman Vyacheslavovich (2017–2021)
- Lieutenant Colonel Bohdan Ivan Bohdanovich (2021–2023)
- Colonel Chernousov Volodymyr Volodymyrovych (2023)

== Sources ==
- Військова частина 3053 Національної гвардії України відзначає своє 23-річчя
- Військова частина 3053 НГУ проводить набір чоловіків на військову службу
- Польовий вихід в/ч 3053
- На території військової частини у Хмельницькому будують храм
