= Danylo Nechai =

Ukrainian Cossack military commander and folk hero

Danylo Nechay
- Данило Нечай
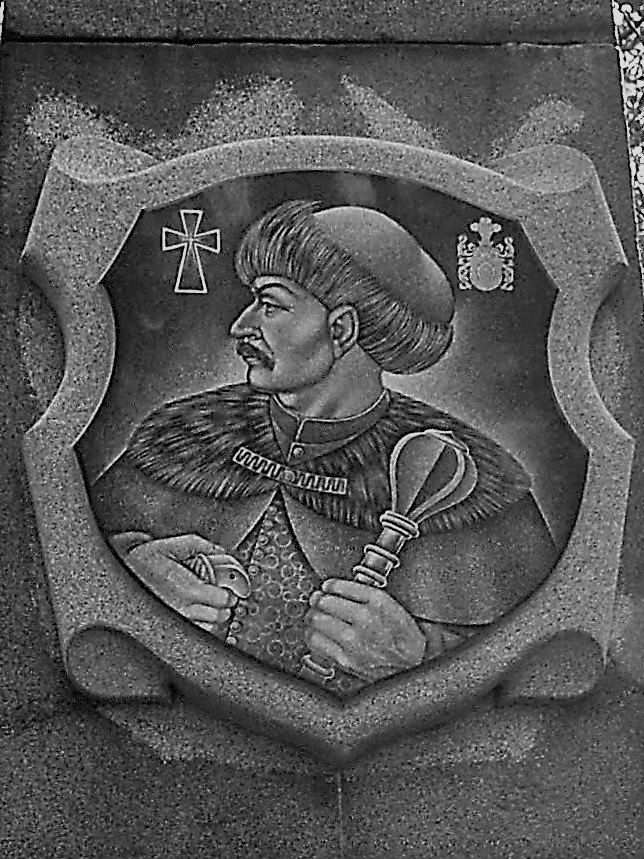
- Nechai as depicted on the obelisk on his grave
- Born: 1 November 1612; Bar, Crown of the Kingdom of Poland, Polish–Lithuanian Commonwealth (now Ukraine)
- Died: 20 February 1651 (aged 38); Krasne, Crown of the Kingdom of Poland, Polish–Lithuanian Commonwealth (now Tyvriv settlement hromada, Ukraine)
- Burial place: 48°55′52″N 28°26′28″E
- Military career
- Allegiance: Cossack Hetmanate
- Unit: Bratslav Regiment
- Conflicts: Khmelnytsky Uprising; Battle of Zhovti Vody; Battle of Korsuń; Battle of Pyliavtsi; Battle of Zboriv (1649); Siege of Zbarazh; Moldavian campaign of Bohdan Khmelnytsky (1650); Battle of Krasne †

Danylo (Note: Also written as Danila or Danilo.) Nechai (Note: Also written as Nechay.) (Ukrainian: Дани́ло Неча́й; (Note: Surname also written as Нечай, Ничай, or Нечаї.) Polish: Danylo Nieczaj or Neczaj; 1 November 1612 – 20 February 1651) was a Ukrainian Cossack military commander during the Cossack-Polish War. He served as Colonel of Bratslav in Podolia from 1648 to 1651 and became known as a leader in the fight for Ukrainian independence. His brother was Ivan Nechai.

The Nieczaj family coat of arms, version of Pobóg Polish coat of arms

== Early life ==
Nechai is thought to have been born in the Podolian town of Bar to a noble family. His father was likely Stefan (Stepan), a Ruthenian Orthodox nobleman from Mstsislaw region (eastern Belarus), who had moved to Kyiv region and then to Bratslav. Stefan was married to Anna Nevmyritska, daughter of Peter Fedorovich Gridkovich Nevmyritsky from Berkovets in the outskirts of Kyiv. However, some sources name Danylo's father as Nicholas. Records indicate a connection between the Nechai and Nevmyritsky families in Berkovets, including court cases and joint land holdings. Danylo had brothers named Ivan, Matwey (Matthew), and Yuri (Jurgis), all of whom served in the Cossack military. It is believed that Danylo's father was also a Cossack knight who died when Danylo was very young. Danylo himself had at least two sons, Ivan and Yurii. One son perished in Siberia, likely sent there by Czar Alexis of Russia, while the other (likely Yurii) escaped to Voloshchyna and then to Bukovina (modern-day the Chernivtsi region) before 1647. Danylo's wife was also named Anna.

Some historians claim that Nechai studied at the Kyiv-Mohyla Academy, which he graduated from in 1647, that is, at the age of 35. His attendance at the academy was greatly encouraged by his grandfather Omelko, who campaigned with Petro Konashevych-Sahaidachny in the Black Sea region. According to other sources, in his youth Danylo Nechai lived at the Zaporozhian Sich and probably even among the Don Cossacks, where he studied the art of war. According to Cossack legends, Danylo Nechai was an associate of Pavlo Pavlyuk-But, and Yakiv Ostryanyn, and a twin of Ivan Bohun.

== Khmelnytsky Uprising ==
In response to Polish-Lithuanian encroachments, Nechai participated in the Khmelnytsky Uprising that sought to secure independent Cossack rule over Ukraine. This rebellion was directed against Polish magnates, their representatives and supporters (including the Catholic church and Jewish communities), and other vassals of the Polish king. In 1647 Nechai accompanied Bohdan Khmelnytsky to Mykytyn Sich. Nechai participated in the capture of the Fortress of Kodak by the Cossacks, and in the battles of the Yellow Waters and Korsun. He organized and led the Bratslav Regiment, becoming one of the associates of Maksym Kryvonis, and distinguished himself in the battles in Vinnytsia and near Medzhybizh. In the latter episode, on 20 July 1648 2,500 Jewish residents of Medzhybizh were killed by troops under the command of Kryvonis, with the Jewish population of the town being virtually eradicated, as there were no burials recorded for several years after 1648, consistent with the depopulation. Nechai participated in the battles of Starokostiantyniv, and Pylyavtsi. The Polish memoirist Stanisław Oswięcim in his "Diariusz" called Nechai "one of the most important among the rebels, a rebel to whom the Cossacks themselves gave the first place after Khmelnytsky." Contemporaries respectfully recognized his "extraordinary courage and intelligence". Nechai participated in the campaign of the Cossack army in Galicia, where on behalf of Khmelnytsky they seized the Brody Castle and, together with other commanders, besieged Lviv, and stormed Zamość. After return to Kyiv, from December 1648 he commanded the city's garrison. In the winter of 1649 Nechai led negotiations with Polish representatives in Kyiv and Pereyaslav, and in the following year he was honoured for his role in the Zbarazh and in the Battle of Zboriv. He was opposed to the signing of the Treaty of Zboriv by Bohdan Khmelnytsky as he believed it compromised the position of the Cossacks.

== Later campaigns and death ==
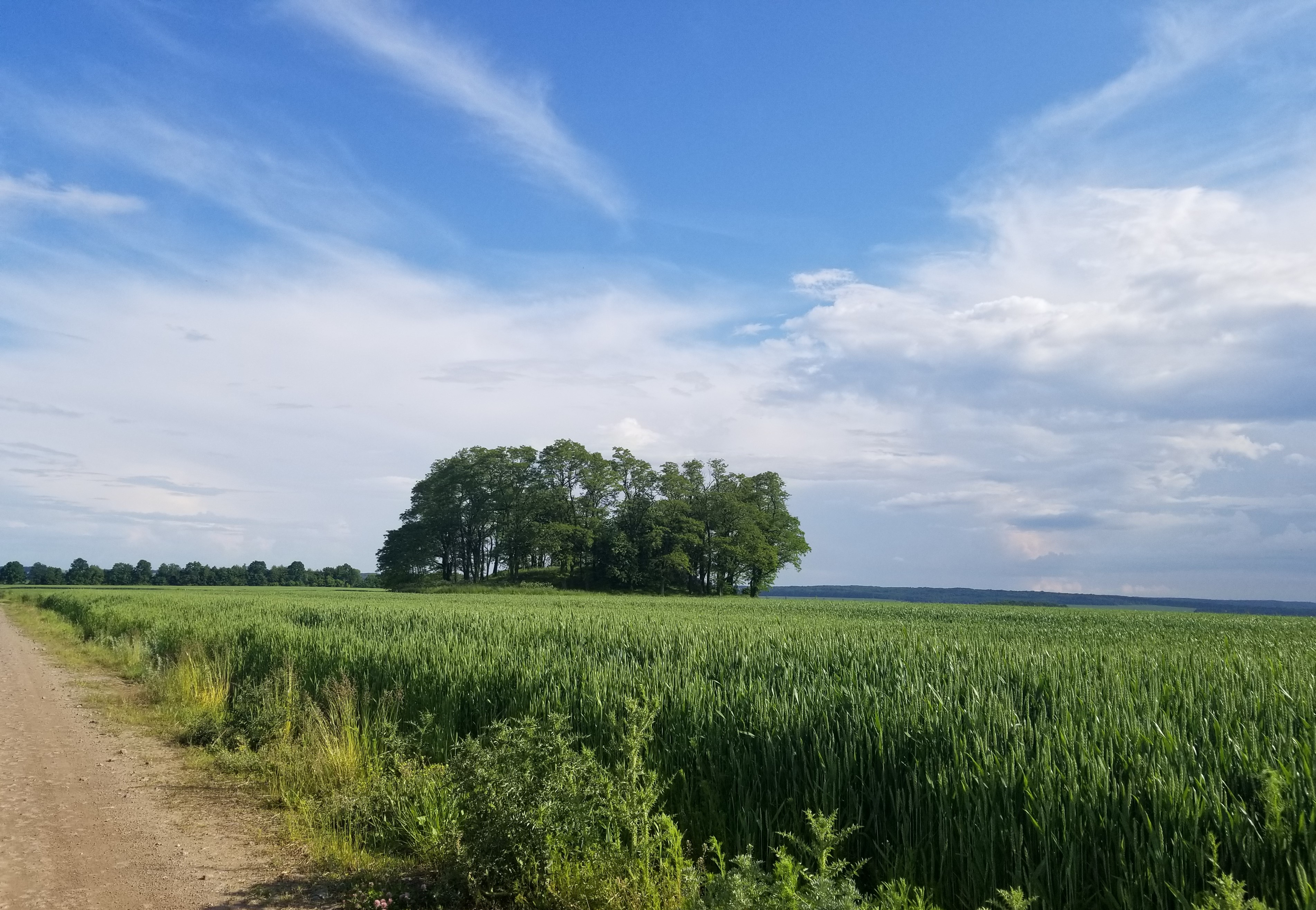
Nechai's grave

During Khmelnytskyi's invasion of Moldavia, together with Matviy Gladky Nechai took Soroca, and in September 1650 captured the Moldavian capital of Iaşi, forcing its ruler Vasile Lupu to agree to an alliance with Tymish Khmelnytsky. In 1651 Nechai commanded the south-western front of Cossack troops. While celebrating Shrovetide, he was ambushed and died in a battle with numerically superior Polish forces led by field hetman Marcin Kalinowski, who captured Nechai's coat of arms. This happened in the town of Krasne in Podolia.

In 1954 a granite obelisk was erected on Nechai's supposed grave, located northeast of the town in today's Vinnytsia Oblast. Local lore purports that the hill on the grave was built by Nechai's loyal troops, with each Cossack carrying a hatful of soil to the site. Another legend claims that his body was carried to Kyiv and interred in a monastery. According to a different version, the Poles cut up Nechai's body and scattered it: presumably it was gathered by his loyal forces, and then buried or possibly carried to Kyiv (either in part or together) or elsewhere. It has also been postulated that Nechai's alleged grave is in reality a set of ancient Scythian Mounds. According to Soviet archives, prior to the erection of the obelisk, around 1951 an excavation performed on the site discovered a single skeleton, but without a head.

Perhaps the best theory as to where Nechai's body was buried states that he was beheaded after death. Ukrainian historian Mykhailo Hrushevsky presented this theory, based on an account written by a Polish historian, who stated that after a three-day battle, Polish troops entered the church where Danylo's body was laid, killed the four priests and one monk present, and then took Danylo's head. The body was possibly also taken, but if so, it was rescued by loyal troops who then carried it to the existing Scythian mound complex and buried it within. As to where the head went there remain at least three theories: 1) taken by the Poles as a war trophy, 2) taken by loyal troops to a Kyiv monastery, or 3) presented as a gift (presumably by the Poles) to the Crimean Khan. That said, other scholars maintain that his body was, in fact, taken entirely to a Kyiv monastery.

In Ukraine Nechai is considered to be a folk hero, with folk songs often depicting him as an ideal Cossack knight. Considered to be second only to Khmelnytsky, he is a hero of the fight for Ukrainian independence and is honored to this day by an annual procession to his burial mound (mohyla) on the date of his death. 40th Regiment of the Ukrainian army is also named in honour of Nechai.

== Images ==
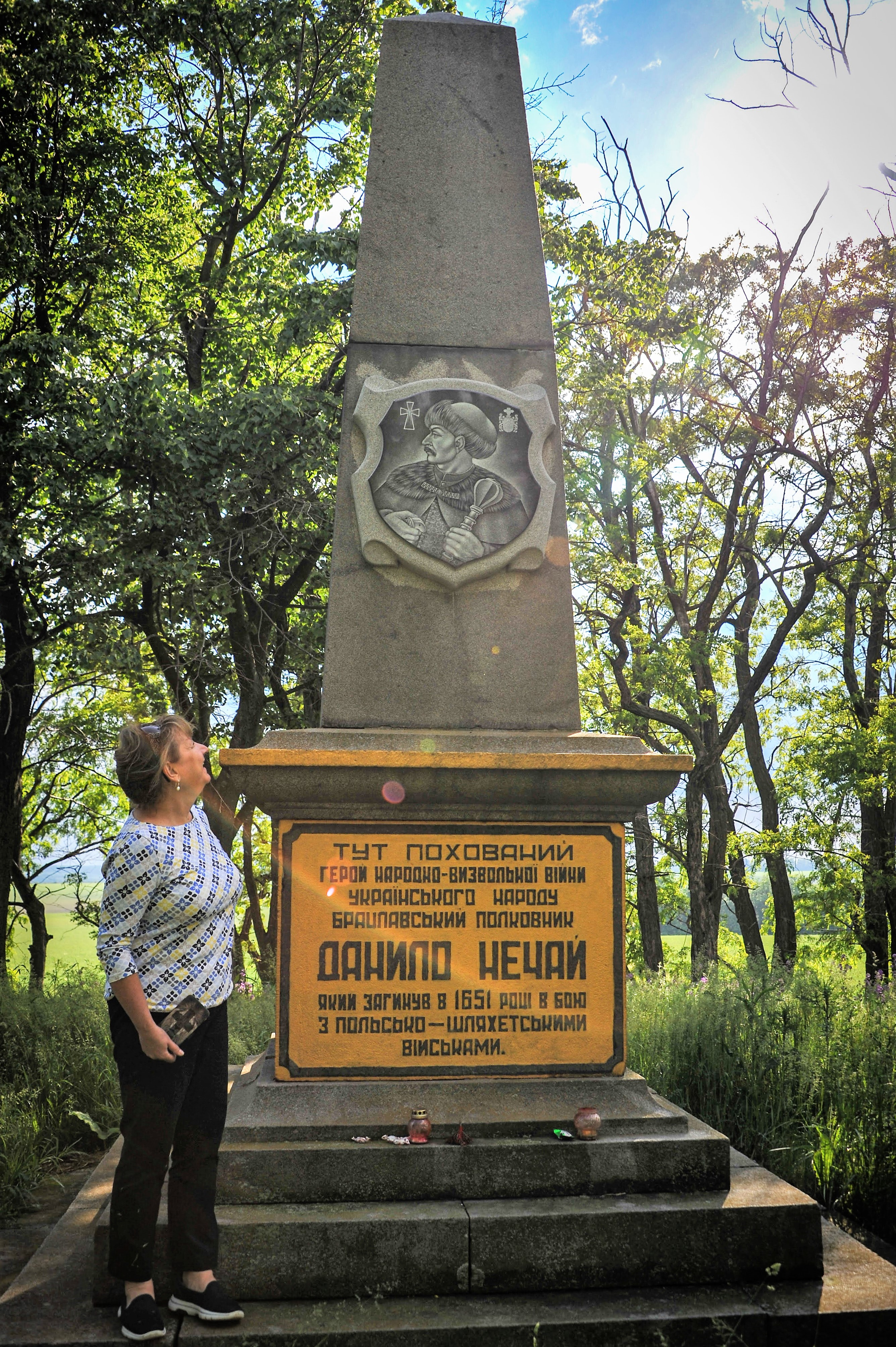
Danylo Nechai's grave marker

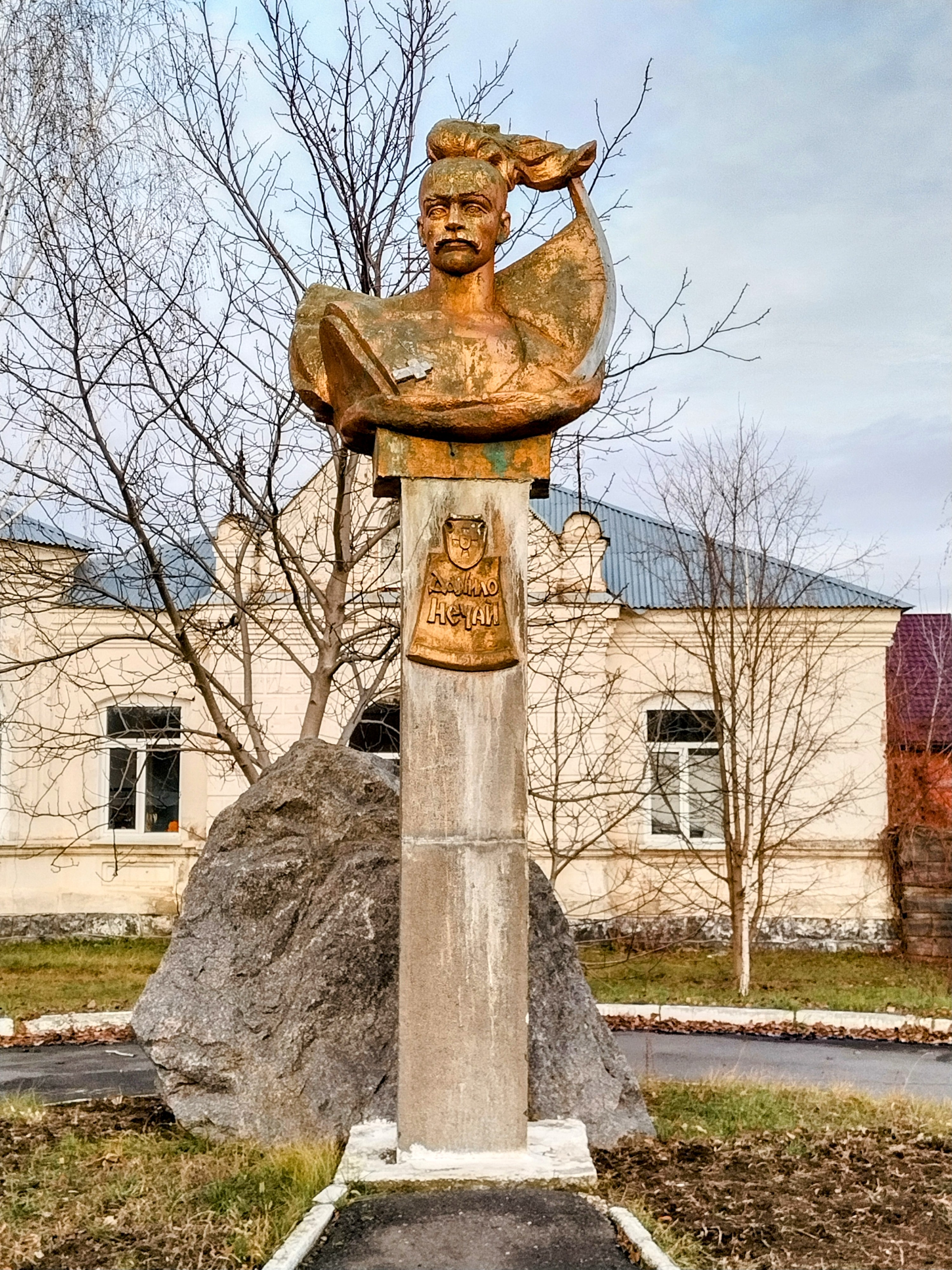
Monument to Nechai in Bratslav
