= Yakiv Markovych =

Portrait of Yakiv Markovych

Yakiv Andriyovych Markovych (Ukrainian: Яків Андрійович Маркович, 7 October 1696 – 9 November 1770) was a Cossack nobleman, statesman, chronicler and author of memoirs. His posthumously published diary has earned Markovych the status of one of the most cited Ukrainian authors of the 18th century.

== Biography ==
According to his own diary, Yakiv Markovych was born in 1696, during the year of the fall of Azov. His father, Andriy Markovych, was an offspring of Marko Avramovych, a rich inhabitant of Pryluky. Avramovych is claimed by some historians to have been a baptised Jew, who adopted Christianity in order to survive the Khmelnytsky Uprising. Andriy's career benefitted from the fact, that his sister Anastasia Markovych was married to hetman Ivan Skoropadskyi, and in 1714 he was appointed colonel of Lubny. Yakiv's mother Anna was the daughter of Krolevets sotnyk Ivan Makovskyi.

Yakiv Markovych graduated from the Kyiv Mohyla Academy, where one of his teachers was Theophan Prokopovych. He knew several foreign languages, including Latin, Hebrew, Polish and German. Despite having achieved major success in his theological studies, Markovych eventually chose a secular career. Following his graduation, he married Olena, the daughter of acting hetman Pavlo Polubotok. In 1718 he reached the rank of military fellow, and in 1721 became a bunchuk fellow. In 1721 and 1723–1725 Markovych served as acting colonel of Lubny.

A careful politician, Markovych refused to support petitions of Cossack starshyna to the Russian government concerning the right to elect new hetmans and asking authorities to preserve the political and administrative structure of the Hetmanate. While in Russian military service, in 1725–1727 he took part in the Gilan campaign, and in 1739 participated in the Prut campaign. In 1740 Markovych was appointed general treasurer, and stayed on that post until his retirement from service in 1762. In 1741, as a member of the Ukrainian delegation at the coronation of Elizabeth of Russia, he delivered a congratulatory speech for the empress.

Markovych was a major landowner, and controlled several villages and khutirs along with mills, distilleries and inns. Most of his possessions were concentrated in the Hlukhiv sotnia of Nizhyn Regiment, as well as in Pyriatyn, Lokhvytsia and Chornukhy sotnias of Lubny Regiment. Markovych profitted from trade with horilka, meat, cheese, fruit and other produce of his manors; additionally, peasants living in his lands engaged in transportation of salt from the Crimean Khanate. In order to manage the lands under his ownership, Markovych was forced to travel a lot, and issues of economy comprise a major part of his diary. Records from the latter also mention numerous cases where corporal punishment was employed against peasants under his jurisdiction.

Being a religious person, Markovych regularly confessed his sins and was a patron of numerous churches and monasteries. During one of his military campaigns, he bought out and converted several Kalmyk children in order to multiply the Christian population. Yakiv Markovych died in 1770 in the village of Svarkiv (now Svarkove) near Hlukhiv, where a stone church had earlier been constructed at his expense.

== Personal life ==
Markovych had 8 children from his first marriage with Olena Polubotok, who died in 1745. He married for a second time with Maria Mytkevych, who gave birth to 6 children. However, most of the children from both marriages died before reaching adult age.

Markovych was known to enjoy food and drink, spending fortunes in order to buy various exotic goods, including cane sugar, Chinese tea, Turkish coffee, olives and imported wine. According to his diary, Markovych's weight reached 6 poods and 6 pounds (101 kg). He regularly took steam baths, underwent bloodletting and minor surgeries, took various powders and mixtures and used more unorthodox methods to improve his health and appearance, such as washing his head with kvass. In his free time, Markovych engaged in hunting, played cards and listened to musical performances.

== Literary works ==
4th volume of Markovych's diary

Markovych authored both prose and poetic works. A number of his compositions were inspired by psalms, as well as works by John Chrysostom and other Fathers of the Church. Markovych was also active in the field of genealogy and made translations from Latin. Known for his love of books, he kept a large library, which as of 1725 included 287 publications.

Markovych's most important work is his diary (Діяріюш), which encompasses events during the period of 1717–1767 and contains material on political, socioeconomic and cultural history, as well as important data on daily life of the time. It was first created as the continuation of a historical chronicle composed by Markovych's father in law, Pavlo Polubotok. The diary was first published in 1859 by his grandson in Moscow, but in an abridged form and translated into Russian. A second, more complete publication, took place in 1893, 1895 and 1897 on the pages of Kievskaya Starina magazine, edited by Oleksandr Lazarevskyi. A fourth volume including events up to 1740 was published by the Shevchenko Scientific Society in 1913 under edition of Vadym Modzalevskyi.
