= 40th Danylo Nechai Regiment (Ukraine) =

40th Separate Regiment
- 40-й полк НГ (Ukrainian)
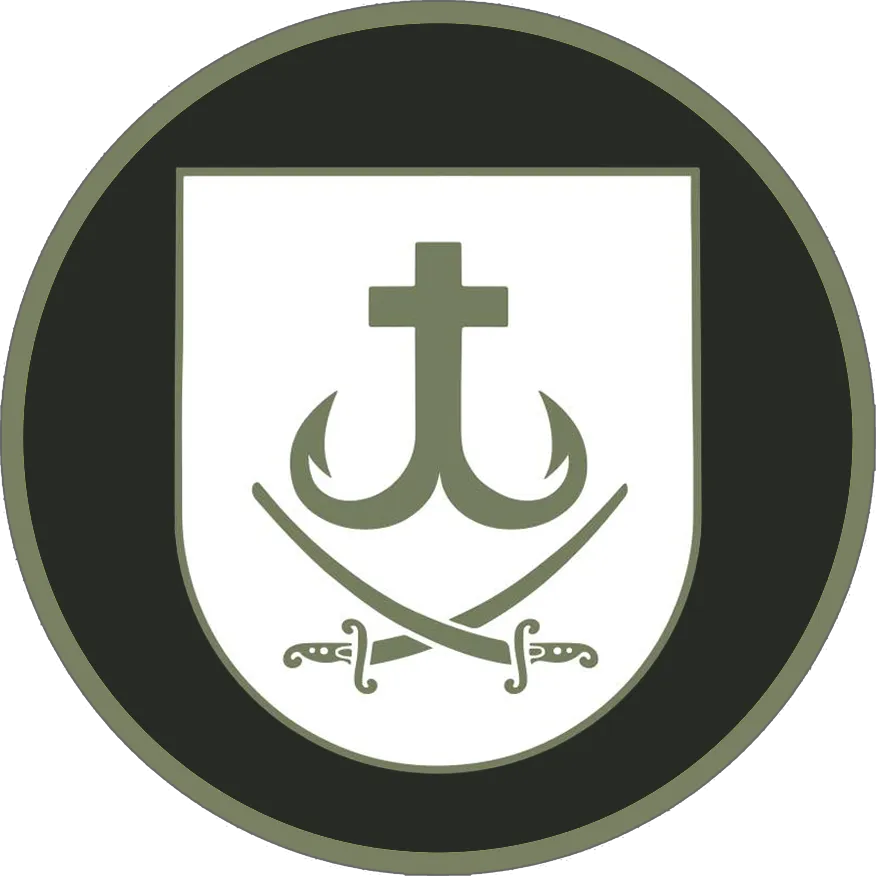
- Regiment Insignia
- Founded: 1993
- Country: Ukraine
- Allegiance: Ministry of Internal Affairs
- Branch: National Guard of Ukraine
- Type: Regiment
- Role: Multipurpose
- Part of: National Guard of Ukraine
- Garrison/HQ: Vinnytsia
- Nickname: Danylo Nechai
- Patron: Danylo Nechai
- Engagements: Russo-Ukrainian war: War in Donbas; Battle of Mariupol; Russian invasion of Ukraine

Commanders
- Current commander: Colonel Volodymyr Zinoviovych Zhula

The 40th Separate "Danylo Nechai" Regiment is a regiment of the National Guard of Ukraine tasked with safeguarding prisons, mental asylums, medical facilities, escorting arrested and convicted persons, guarding defendants during court proceedings, providing assistance to the police in maintaining public order and protection of Ukrainian territorial integrity. It was established as the 8th Separate Brigade on the basis of the 481st Convoy Regiment in 1993. It is headquartered in Vinnytsia.

== History ==
It was established as the 8th Separate Brigade of the Internal Troops of Ukraine on the basis of the 481st Convoy Regiment on 17 March 1993. On 4 June 2000, the brigade was reformed into the 40th Regiment of Internal Troops. On 18 October 2000, the regiment was placed under the command of the Western Territorial Command and on 21 December 2004, under the authority of the Southern Territorial Command. The regiment received the tasks of safeguarding prisons, mental asylums, medical facilities, escorting arrested and convicted persons, guarding defendants during court proceedings, providing assistance to the police in maintaining public order.

In 2014, the regiment became part of the reestablished National Guard of Ukraine and participated in the War in Donbass. It took part in the Battle of Mariupol, on 21 September 2014, in the "Skhidniy" neighborhood of Mariupol, the regiment's soldiers were inspecting vehicles at the entrance to the city when they were shelled by separatists using mortars in spite the ceasefire agreement, a soldier of the regiment (Deren Serhiy Vasyliovych) was killed and two locals were wounded. On 7 October 2014, in the afternoon, the 29th checkpoint near Donetskyi was shelled by separatists killing a soldier of the regiment (Kulibaba-Bukhov Victor Anatoliyovych), and wounding two more soldiers. On 14 October 2014, the 40th regiment received the task of conducting reconnaissance on the approaches to the 32nd checkpoint. The column consisted of two combat vehicles a BMP and an APC. The column moved forward in the morning, and came under intense fire, an armored personnel carrier was hit, only the BMP carrying personnel reached the 32nd checkpoint and after assessing the situation on the 32nd, they returned to aid the hit vehicle but didn't knew that the personnel in the hit vehicle had been evacuated. On the way, the vehicle's turret got jammed and the gun failed and was soon hit by an ATGM killing two soldiers of the regiment (Labun Evgeny Vasyliovych and Oleksandr Vasyliovych Moskalyuk). The remaining personnel were able to escape and asked for reinforcement. By the time reinforcement arrived the vehicle's driver who belonged to a separate unit had died. On 31 October 2014, separatists attacked the 29th checkpoint using launchable landmine killing a soldier of the regiment (Oleksandr Volodymyrovych Kolyvoshko) deployed there. On 16 November 2014, separatists attacked the intersection between Hirske and Zolote killing an officer of the regiment (Oleksandr Valeryovich Kaplinskyi) guarding the site.

On 14 October 2020, the regiment was awarded the honorary title of "Danylo Nechai".

In May 2022, the regiment was deployed to take part in the Russian invasion of Ukraine. In May-October 2022, the mortar platoon of the regiment destroyed 4 armored personnel carriers, a truck, an BMP, a weaponised vehicle, an unmanned aerial vehicle, an observation post, 13 personnel shelters, and in total the regiment inflicted casualties of about 200 wounded and 100+ Russians killed. On 1 November 2022, the commander of the regiment's mortar Platoon, Soroka Andriy Vitaliyovych, was killed and was posthumously awarded the Hero of Ukraine.

== Structure ==
- 40th Danylo Nechai Regiment
  - Patrol Battalion
  - Rifle Battalion
  - 13th Separate Battalion
  - Combat and Logistical Support Company
  - Reserve Rifle Company
  - Mortar Platoon

== Commanders ==
- Colonel Petro Hryhorovych Makhotin
- Colonel Vasyl Vasylovich Chumak (?-2017)
- Colonel Serhiy Hryhorovych Mamchenko (2017-2019)
- Colonel Volodymyr Zinoviovych Zhula (2019-)

== Sources ==
- Фахівці з конвоювання покращили навички у Вінниці
- У Вінниці новобранці військової частини 3008 Національної гвардії склали присягу
- Нацгвардійці військової частини 3008 склали присягу на вірність українському народові
