= Front of house =

Area of a performance venue open to the public

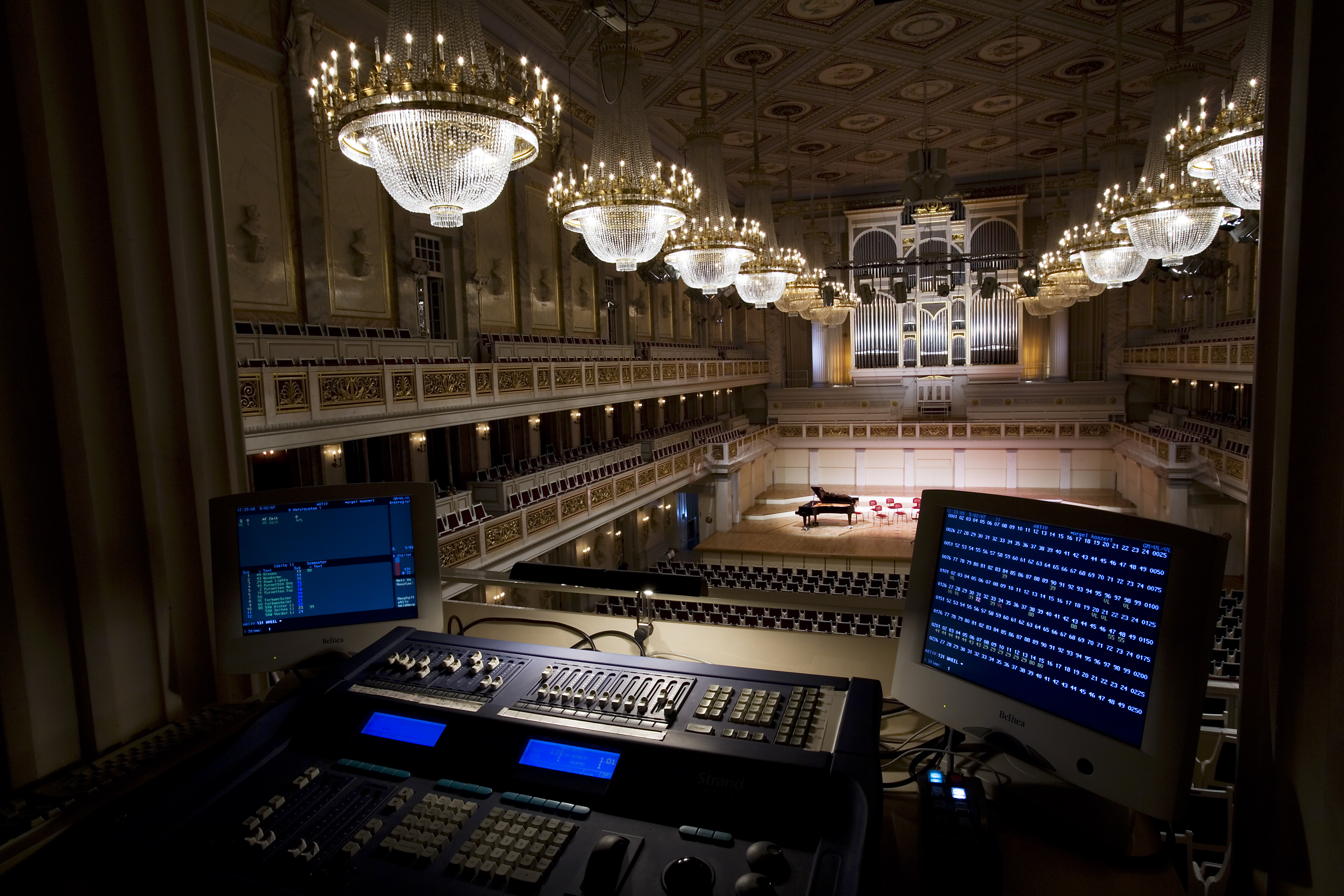
View from a theater's lighting control booth, located in (but sectioned off from) its front of house area

In the performing arts, the front of house (FOH) is the part of a performance venue that is open to the public. In theatres and live music venues, it consists of the auditorium, and foyers, as opposed to the front stage and backstage areas. In a theatre, the front of house manager is responsible for welcoming guests, refreshments, and making sure the auditorium is set out properly. By contrast, back of house (BOH) is any operations that are not visible to the audience, such as props management, costume design, stage set fabrication, lighting control, and other support functions.

Both terms are also used in the restaurant, hospitality, and retailing industries. Back of house refers to any work operations that do not have direct customer contact. Examples include cooking, dishwashing, cleaning, shipping and receiving, maintenance and repairs, accounting, and other indirect support tasks which are not usually visible to customers.

== Live venues ==
Sound operators, excluding the monitor engineers, are normally positioned in a small sectioned-off area front of house, surrounded by the audience or at the edge of the audience area. From this position they have unobstructed listening and a clear view of the performance, enabling the operation of the main speaker system, show control consoles and other equipment. In this case, front of house can refer to either the general audience/public area or to the specific small section from which the show is mixed.

The front-of-house speakers are the main speakers that cover the audience, and the front-of-house desk is the desk that generates the front-of-house audio mix. In smaller venues the front-of-house desk may also produce foldback (monitor) mixes for the monitor speakers onstage, whereas in larger venues there will normally be a second mixing desk for monitor control positioned just off the side of the main stage. The audio engineer that designs the front-of-house sound system and puts it into place for the show/event is the system engineer, and this role is often separate from the person who operates the mixing desk who is often employed by the band directly on larger tours or employed by the venue for smaller tours. The touring engineer is usually assisted by a house sound engineer (employed by the venue) who will be familiar with the installed system of the venue.

In stage lighting, any lighting fixtures that are on the audience side of the proscenium arch are referred to as FOH. The lighting operator may also be located in the audience area as well, but are often in a lighting booth.

This term can also refer to the individuals whose primary work is dealing with patrons, including house managers, ticket vendors, bartenders, merchandise vendors, ushers, and museum attendants.

In any theater space, the front of house is an area that manages all the facilities and the audience during a performance or other event. A house manager oversees all facilities and the personnel who work the house, including the assistant house manager, ticket attendants, ushers, concessions and merchandise employees, and security. The front of house also follows and enforces the rules for their employees and the audience, which may govern smoking, drinking, eating, or use of electronic devices.

== Personnel ==
=== House manager ===
The house manager who works in the theater takes on the responsibility of many aspects of the front of house or the theater space itself. Whether that be for audience management or facilities management. A house manager can have multiple roles depending on the theater space that is being used. They also work with the technical director or the stage manager to coordinate the schedule of a show, including the time it starts or how many intermissions it has, depending on the performance. They supervise all the employees who work the house for a performance or other event in the theater.

=== Ushers ===
Ushers work with either the house manager or lead usher to manage the flow of the audience. Ushers have different responsibilities and strict protocol when managing the audience section of the theater.

=== Concessions ===
For the rules of food and drinks, there are concession stands in the venue for audiences to buy certain food or drinks that the theaters allow either before the performance or at intermission.

== See also ==
- Front office – a similar concept in the hospitality and office management industries
- Live sound mixing
