= Lubny Regiment =

Lubny Regiment Лубенський полк
- Coat of arms of Lubny Regiment
- Active: 1649—1781
- Country: Cossack Hetmanate
- Type: Cossack Regiment
- Size: 13 sotnias (1658); 23 (18th century)
- Garrison/HQ: Lubny, Ukraine

Commanders
- Notable commanders: Yakiv Markovych

The Lubny Regiment (Ukrainian: Лубенський полк, romanized: Lubenskyi polk) was one of ten territorial-administrative subdivisions of the Cossack Hetmanate. The regiment's capital was the city of Lubny, now in Poltava Oblast of central Ukraine. Other major cities of the regiment were Pyriatyn, Hlynsk and Romny.

The Lubny Regiment was founded in 1649, and was combined with the Myrhorod Regiment in 1658. During combination, 7 sotnias from the Myrhorod Regiment, 4 from the Kropyvna Regiment, and 2 from the Poltava Regiment were added into the Lubny Regiment. After reformation, the regiment consisted of a total of 13 sotnias, and later on in the 18th century — of 23 sotnias.

According to documents of 1723, the regiment consisted of 2,687 land cossacks, and 3,968 horseback cossacks. In 1781, the regiment was officially abolished, and its territory was reformed into the Kyiv and Chernihiv Governorates.

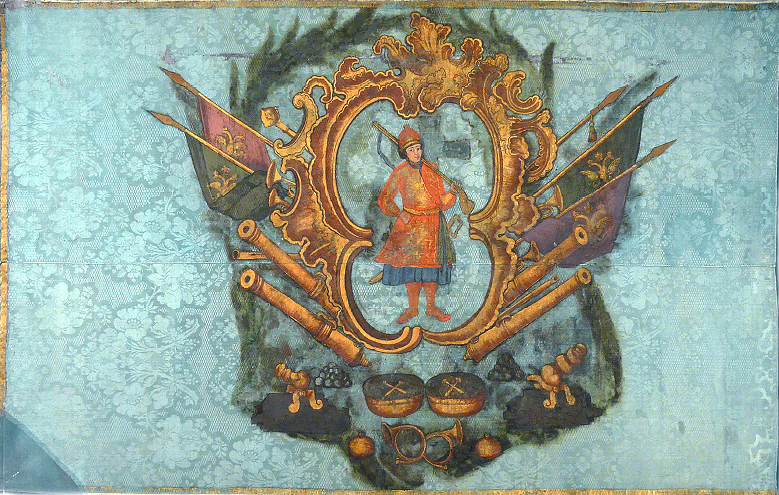
Flag of the Sencha (village) Sotnia of the Lubny Regiment

== Government ==
When the regimental administration was first formed in 1649, the Lubny regiment was divided between two regiments. Lubny could not be designated a regimental center in those days, probably due to some private reasons.

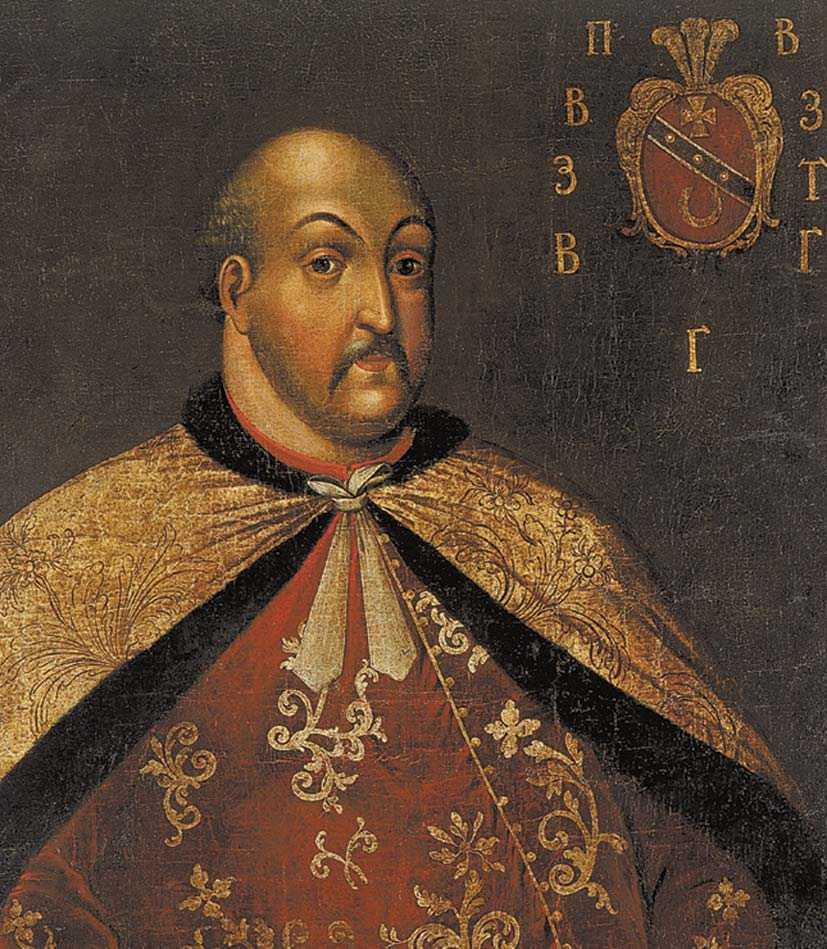
Hryhorii Hamaliia

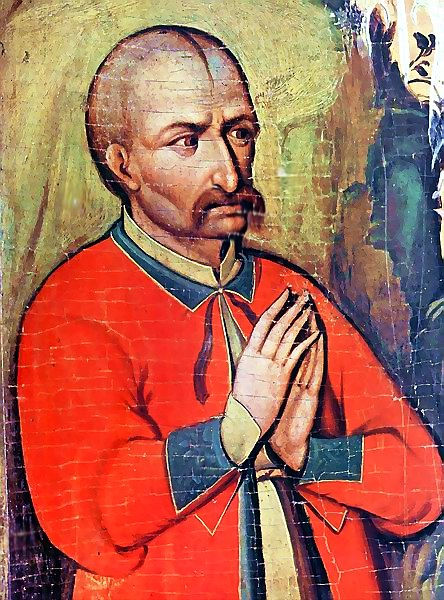
Leontii Svichka

=== Colonels ===
- Pavlo Shvets (1658)
- Yakiv Zasiadko (1659, 1660)
- Stepan Shamlytskyi (1660, 1661, 1663)
- Andrii Pyrskyi (1662, 1663)
- Hnat Yakovych Verbytskyi (1663)
- Hryhorii Mykhailovych Hamaliia (1665, 1668, 1669, 1687—88)
- Bohdan Vasyliovych Shcherbak (1666, 1667)
- Ustym Leshchenko (1668, acting)
- Pylyp Plys (1669)
- Andrii Korniiovych Nesterenko (1672)
- Mykhailo Stepanov (1672)
- Ivan Fedorovych Serbyn (1672, 1675, 1676)
- Maksym Illiashenko (1676—1687)
- Yakym Holovchenko (about 1688)
- Leontii Nazarovych Svichka (1688—1699)
- Dmytro Zelenskyi (1700—1708)
- Vasyl Savych (1710—1714)
- Andrii Markovych (1714—1727)
- Yakiv Markovych (1721, 1723-1725, acting)
- Petro Danylovych Apostol (1727—1757)
- Ivan Petrovych Kuliabka (1757—1770)
- Stepan Petrovych Maksymovych (1770—1781)

=== Other notable commanders ===
- Mikhail Kazimierz Skarzhinsky (centurion of the 1st Regimental Hundred, 1737–1750)
- Mikhail Mikhailovich Skarzhinsky (centurion of the 2nd Regimental Hundred, 1765–1773)

== See also ==
- Regiment
