= Museum attendant =

A museum attendant (or gallery attendant) looks after a gallery in a museum for security reasons, to help museum visitors, and sometimes to help curators in moving objects or changing the gallery displays. The position is sometimes undertaken by volunteers.

== Responsibilities ==
Typical responsibilities include:

- Conducting the front of house operation of museum
- Provides information about regulations, facilities, and exhibits to visitors
- Opening museum during opening hours
- Greeting visitors on arrival
- Inviting visitors to sign the visitor book
- Monitoring visitors while viewing exhibits
- Cautioning people (often children) for not complying with museum regulations
- Handing out promotional materials
- Answering questions concerning exhibits, regulations, facilities, etc.
- Arranging tours for schools or other groups
- Organizing volunteers or other staff members to conduct tours
- Examining exhibits and objects periodically
- Notifying museum personnel when repair or replacement is required

The exact nature of the responsibilities required will depend on the size and type of museum, and the exact role designated to the museum attendant.
