= Treaty of Bila Tserkva =

1651 peace treaty between Ukrainian Cossacks and Poland-Lithuania

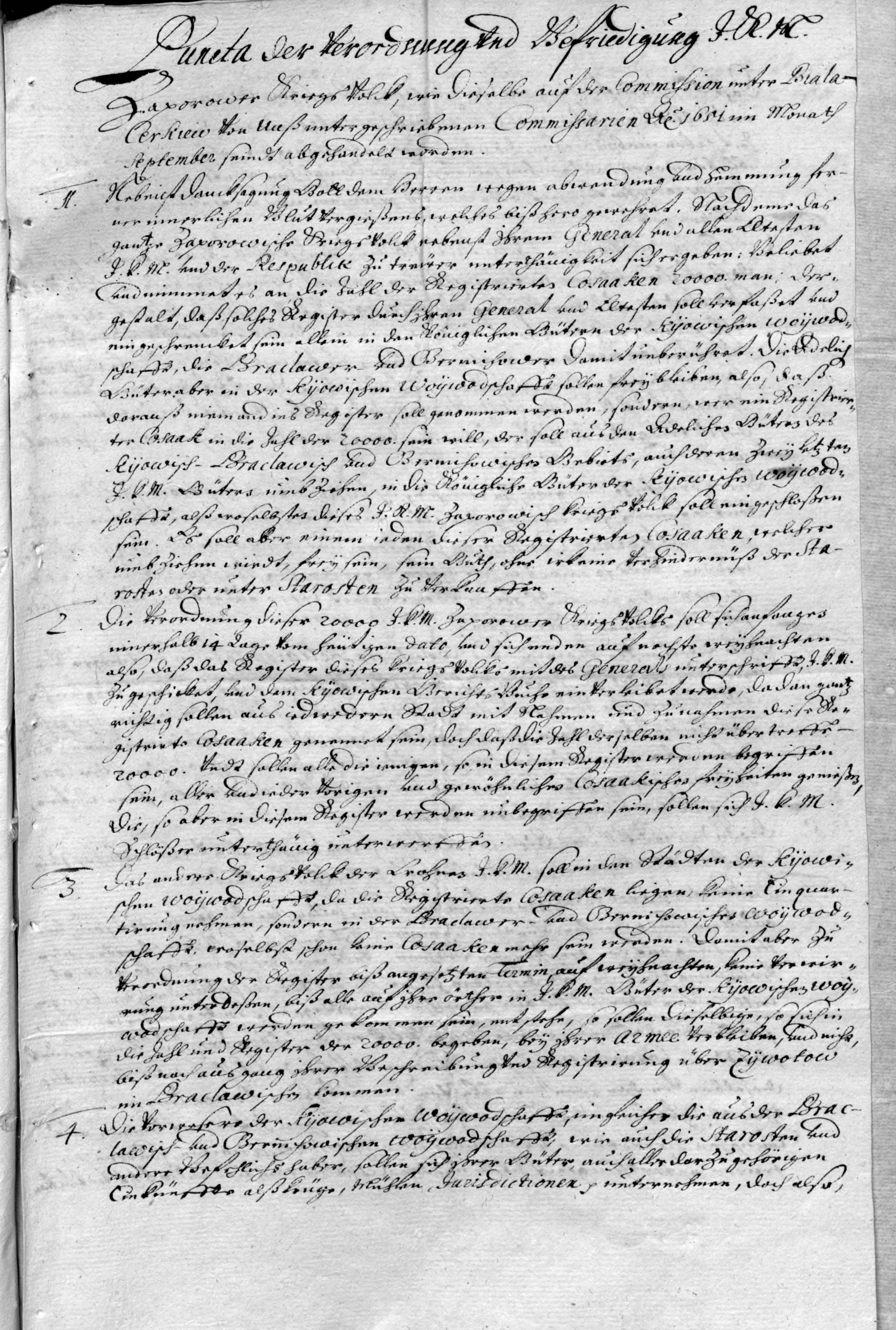
Page 1 from a copy of the Treaty in the National Archives of Sweden.

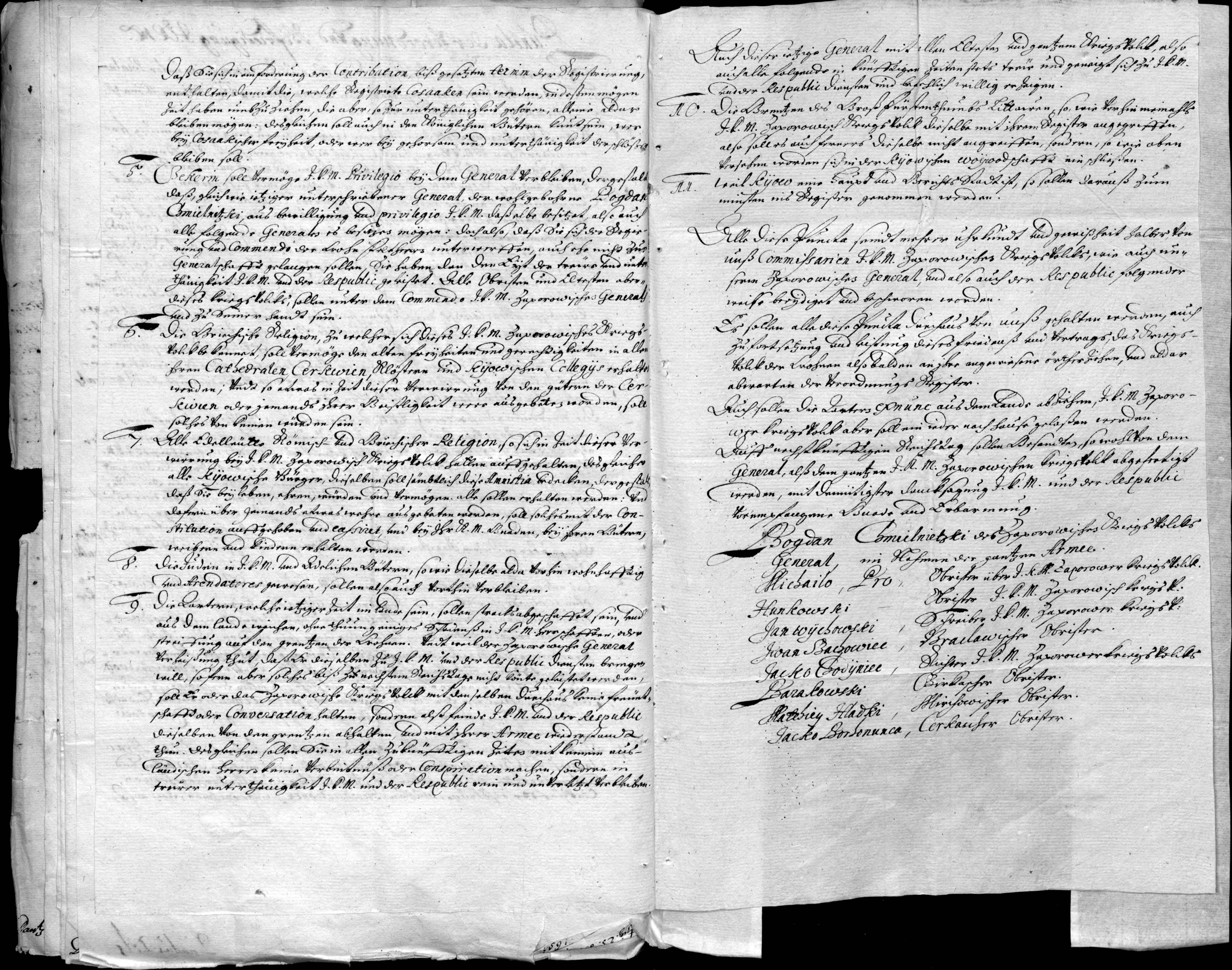
Pages 2 and 3 from a copy of the Treaty in the National Archives of Sweden.

The Treaty of Bila Tserkva was a peace treaty signed on 28 September 1651 (O.S. 18 September 1651), between the Polish–Lithuanian Commonwealth and the Ukrainian Cossacks in the aftermath of the Battle of Bila Tserkva. It was signed for the Poles by Mikołaj Potocki, Marcin Kalinowski, Adam Kisiel, Stanisław Lanckoroński, palatine of Bratslav, Zbigniew Gorajski, castellan of Kyiv, and Mikolaj Kazimierz Kossakowski, deputy judge of Bratslav. Signing for Lithuania were Prince Janusz Radziwill (1612-1655), Palatine Jerzy Karol Hlebowicz, and Wincenty Gosiewski. Signing for the Zaporozhian Host was Bohdan Khmelnytsky "on behalf of the entire host".

According to the concluded agreement, the number of Registered Cossacks was reduced from 40,000 (the Treaty of Zboriv) to 20,000 and their residence restricted to the area of the Kiev Voivodeship. Additionally, the Brastlav and Chernihiv palatinates were given back to Polish governmental administrators, and the noblemen were permitted to return to their properties. "The Greek religion to which the Zaporozhian Host adheres is to be considered to have its ancient liberties according to the old laws", "the noblemen of the Roman and Greek faith who were in the Zaporozhian Host...are to be amnestied", and "the Jews who lived in royal and nobiliary estates and held leases there are to do so now also". Most importantly, "the Horde...is immediately to be sent home" and "the present Hetman...will have any relations or agreements with it or with foreign rulers, but will remain totally and inviolably in loyal subordination to the king and the Commonwealth, faithfully and benevolently serving the Commonwealth in everything." "Envoys from the hetman and the Zaporozhian Host are to be sent to the very next Diet, with humble thanks for the mercy and favor of the king and the entire Commonwealth."

The treaty was blocked by a single vote, the Liberum Veto, and thus never ratified by the Polish diet. "Moreover, by a resolution of 18 February", 1652, "the House of Delegates raised a rather definite protest against it and declared it invalid (owing to the overstepping of the instruction given to the Diet commissioners)...they were to agree to 6,000 Cossacks, not 20,000". Nevertheless, Khmelnytsky decided to fulfill its provisions and even ordered a Cossack detachment to pacify a peasant uprising against returning nobles in the Kiev palatinate.

== See also ==
- The Ruin (Ukrainian history)#List of treaties
