= Kropyvna Regiment =

Kropyvna Regiment Кропивнянський полк
- Coat of Arms
- Active: 1649 - 1658
- Country: Cossack Hetmanate
- Type: Cossack Regiment
- Size: 14 sotnias 1992-2053 Cossacks
- Garrison/HQ: Kropyvna, Ukraine
- Engagements: Khmelnytsky Uprising

Commanders
- Notable commanders: Filon Dzhelaliy

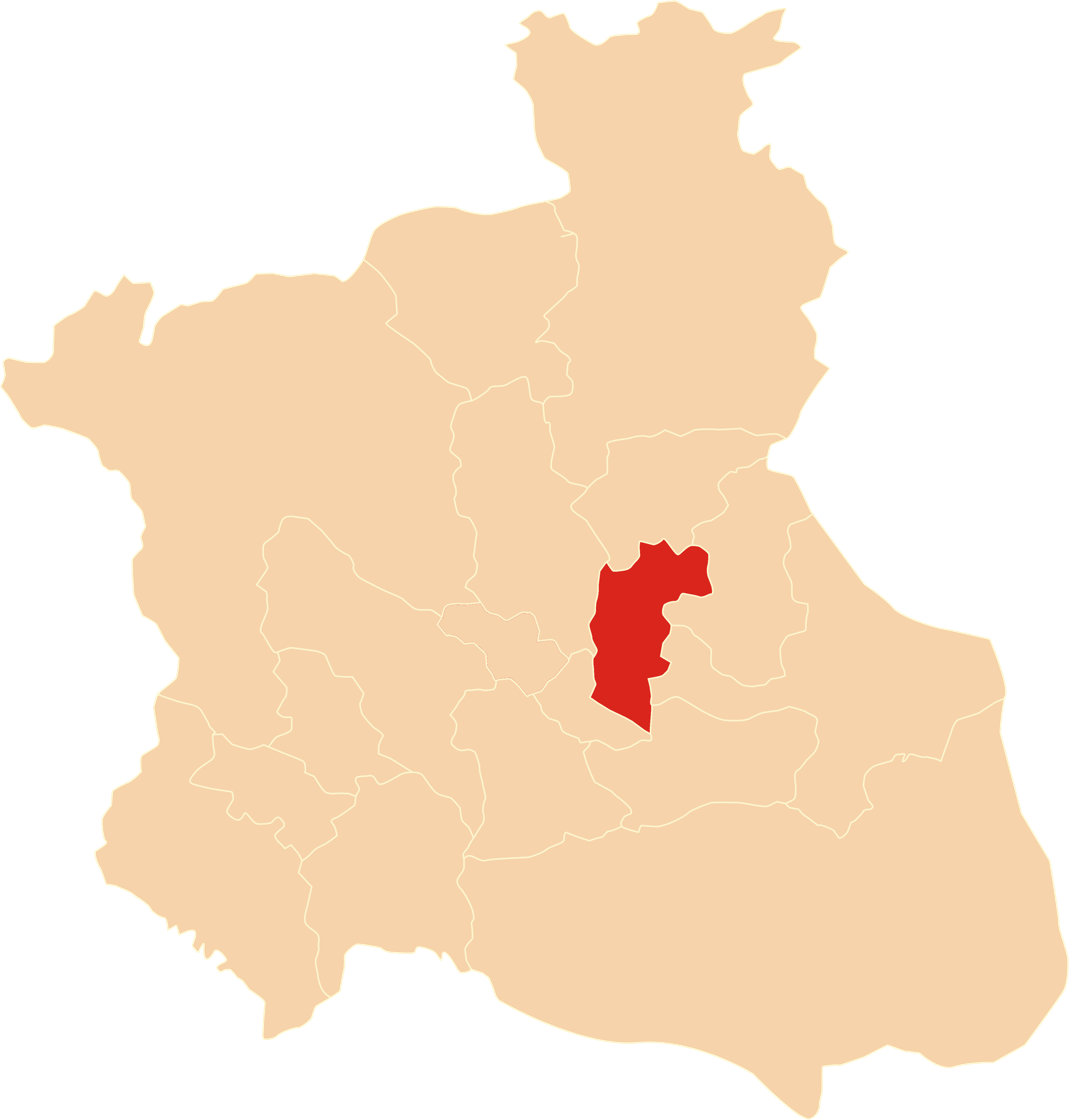
Location of Kropyvna Regiment (red) in the Cossack Hetmanate, 1660

The Kropyvna Regiment (Ukrainian: Кропивнянський полк, romanized: Kropyvnianskyi polk) was one the territorial-administrative subdivisions of the Cossack Hetmanate. The regiment's capital was the city of Kropyvna, now a village in Cherkasy Oblast of central Ukraine.

In 1648, during Khmelnytsky Uprising, Irkliiv Regiment was raised, with colonel Mykhailo Teliuchenko commanding it. On 16 October 1649 Irkliiv and neighboring part of Lubny Regiment were merged to form Kropyvna Regiment. The only regimental colonel was Filon Dzhelaliy.

Hetman Ivan Vyhovsky disbanded the regiment in 1658 after death of colonel Filon Dzhelaliy. The regiments sotnias were all transferred to recreated Irkliiv Regiment and Lubny Regiment.

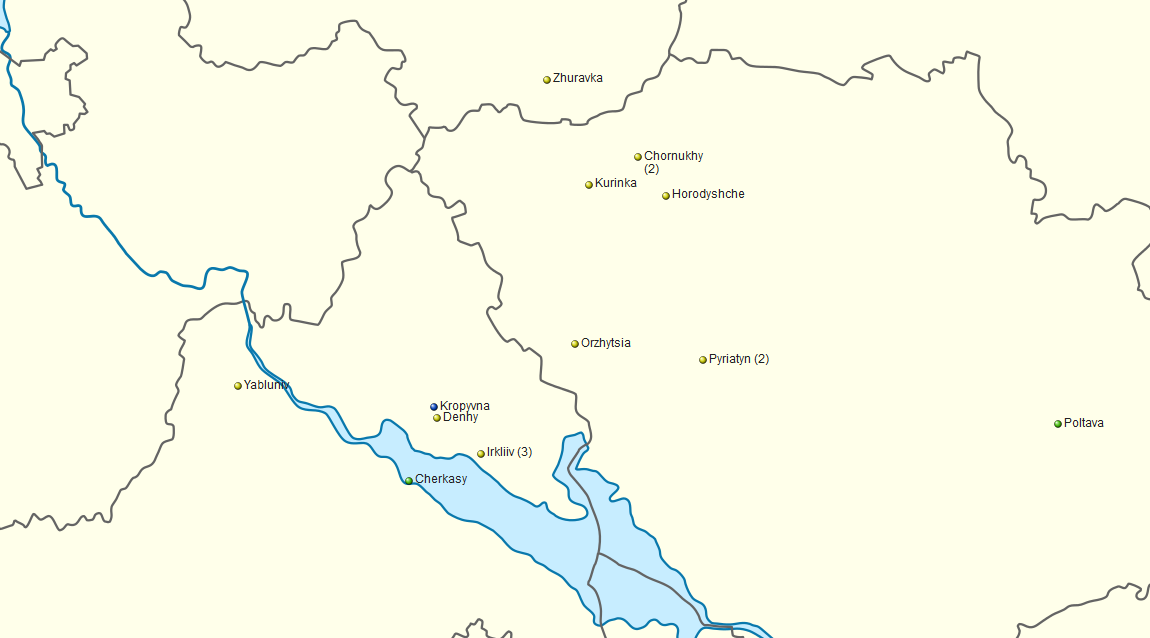
Kropyvna regiment sotnias location

== Structure ==
The regiment comprised 14 sotnias with 2010 Cossacks:
Zaruba and Kryvoshyia give the regiment 1992 cossacks in 1649. Giving 3 Irkliiv companies 631 cossacks, the register lists them having 640. Also 2 Pyriatyn companies had 307, as opposed to registers 306. Other discrepancies are shown in ( ).
In 1650 register sent by Bohdan Khmelnytsky to Alexis of Russia, strength of regiment is given at 2053.

October 1649 register
Sotnia	Number of Cossacks	Sotnyk
Kropyvna	207 (284)	Nestor Morozenko
Denhy	88	Demko Ihnatenko
Irkliiv 1st	323	Klym Semenovych
Irkliiv 2nd	185	Kuzma Verhun
Irkliiv 3rd	132	Ivan Voropai
Orzhytsia	97	Matiusha (Matiash)
Yabluniv	137	Matvii Fedorovych
Pyriatyn 1st	187	Nychypir Lelet
Pyriatyn 2nd	119	Ivan Mykolaienko
Chornukhy 1st	134	Matvii Dovhal
Chornukhy 2nd	102	Ivan Kokhan
Horodyshche	99	Martyn Romanenko
Zhuravka	120	Fedir Bulba
Kurinka	80 (81)	Tymish

Notes

1. Note: Haietskyi and Maksymovych list last name for Klym as Daldenko.

== Commanders ==
- Filon Dzhelaliy 1648-1658

== Sources ==
- Заруба, Віктор (2007), Адміністративно-територіальний устрій та адміністрація Війська Запорозького у 1648-1782 рр. [Administrative-territorial structure and administration of the Zaporizhzhya Army in 1648-1782.] (in Ukrainian), Dnipro: Lira, ISBN 978-966-383-095-7
- Bodyansky, Osip (1974), РЕЕСТРА ВСЕГО ВОЙСКА ЗАПОРОЖСКАГО ПОСЛѢ ЗБОРОВСКАГО ДОГОВОРА [Register of all Zaporozhian Host after Treaty of Zboriv] (in Russian), Moscow: Imperial Moscow University
- Hrushevsky, Mykhailo (2015), Том 10. Книга 1: Історичні студії та розвідки (1924— 1930) [Volume 10. Book 1: Historical studies and investigations (1924—1930)] (in Ukrainian), Lviv: Svit, ISBN 978-966-603-223-5
