= Marcin Kalinowski =

Polish nobleman (c. 1605 – 1652)

- Field Crown Hetman
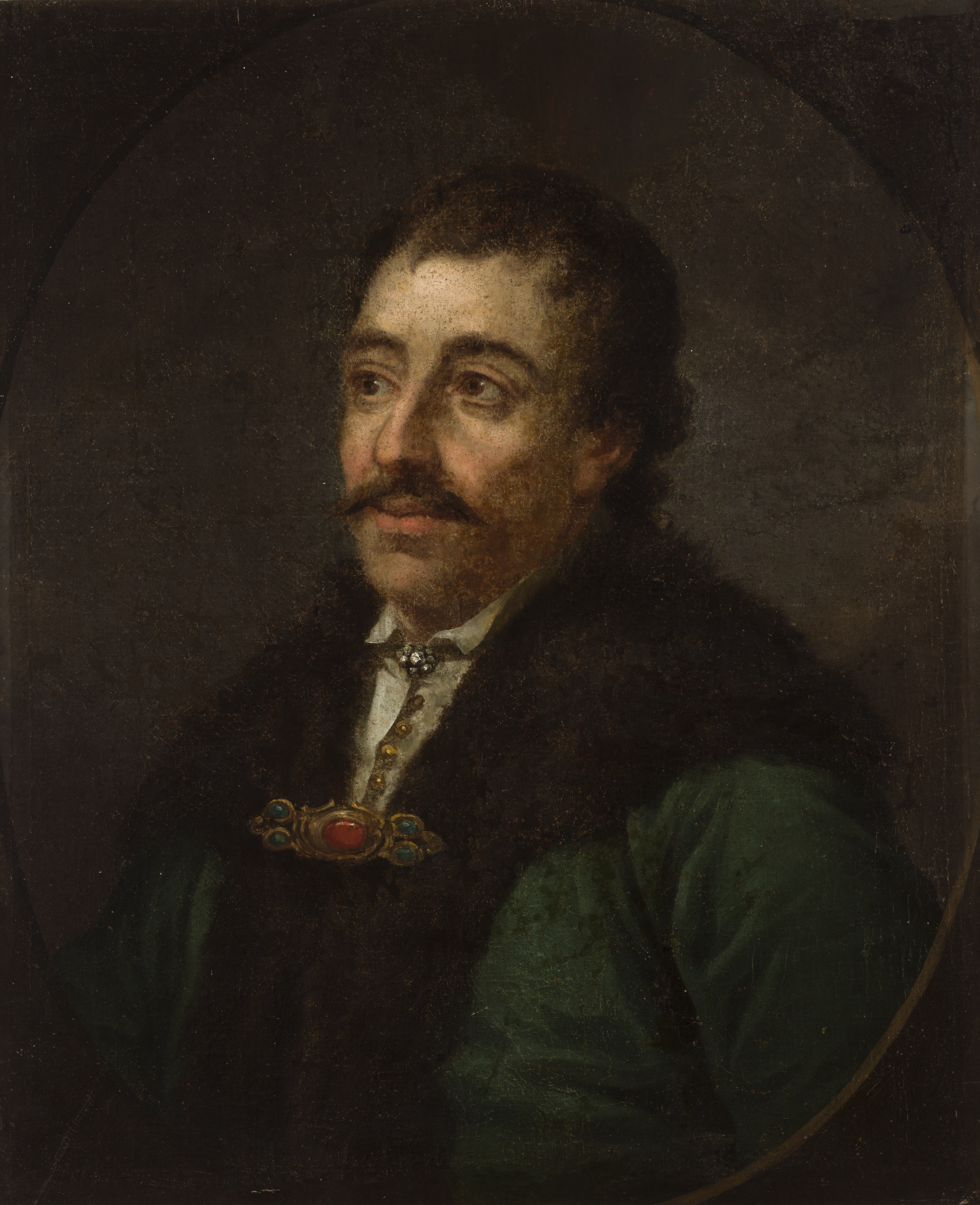
- Coat of arms: Kalinowa
- Born: c. 1605
- Died: 1652
- Noble family: Kalinowski
- Consort: Helena Korecka
- Father: Walenty Aleksander Kalinowski
- Mother: Elżbieta Struś

Marcin Kalinowski (c. 1605 – 1652) was a Polish magnate and nobleman (szlachcic), Kalinowa coat of arms, Field Crown Hetman. He was the son of Walenty Aleksander Kalinowski who fell at the Battle of Cecora (1620).

He began his studies in Poland and continued his education at the University of Leuven. His considerable wealth enabled him to establish his own private army, which suppressed Cossack riots and Tatar raids in Ukraine. In 1635 he became the first voivode of the Czernihów Voivodship. In 1646 he was appointed Field Crown Hetman. During the Khmelnytsky Uprising, he was captured by the Tatars after the Battle of Korsun in 1648. He was a prisoner of war until 1650 when he was ransomed. On 12 May 1651 he commanded victorious Polish army in the Battle of Kopyczyńce between the Poles and combined Cossack-Tatar forces under chief Asand Demko. In 1651, during the subsequent hostilities between the Commonwealth and the Cossack-Tatar alliance, he was the nominal commander of the Polish army's right wing at the great victorious Battle of Beresteczko (de facto commanded Jeremi Wiśniowiecki). Upon death of Grand Crown Hetman Mikołaj Potocki, who was his political and personal adversary, hetman Kalinowski commanded the choicest elements of the Commonwealth army and he had at the camp at Batoh about 10–12,000 soldiers and 10–15,000 servants and camp followers. This army was surprised by the combined Cossack-Tatar army, consequently defeated and then capture of Polish soldiers and servants resulted in a wholesale slaughter of the best elements of Commonwealth army and their retinues, the event known as Battle of Batoh. Hetman was killed on 2 June 1652, during the last day of the battle, when trying to escape from the Cossack-Tatars-filled burning Polish camp, in woods some 3 kilometers from the Polish camp. Hetman's severed head was carried around the Cossack-Tatar camps, allegedly by the Nuredin-Sultan himself.

== Family and possessions ==
Marcin Kalinowski married princes Helena Korecka, Pogonia coat of arms, with whom he had a son Samuel Jerzy Kalinowski, who as a young cavalry commander died with his father at Batoh. Kalinowski was a large landowner in Podolia and Ukraine, amongst others he was the owner of Tulchyn and castle at Sidorów, now a ruin.

== Sources ==
- 'Nowa encyklopedia powszechna PWN,' Warszawa 2004, Volume 4, page 220.
- 'The Cambridge History of Poland: From Origins to Sobieski,' editors Oskar Halecki, W: F. Reddaway, J. H. Penson, Cambridge University Press Archive, Cambridge 1950, ISBN 1-00-128802-5, page 515.
- Tomasz Ciesielski, 'Od Batohu do Żwańca,' Zabrze 2007, ISBN 978-83-89943-23-1, pages 14–40.
- Wojciech Jacek Długołęcki, 'Batoh 1652,' Warszawa 1995.
