= Filon Dzhelaliy =

Filon Dzhelaliy, also Dzhalaliy or Dzhedzhaliy (Ukrainian: Філон Джеджалій), also known as Dzhulaibek, was a Cossack colonel of Crimean Tatar descent who served during the Khmelnytsky Uprising of 1648–1657. Having originally served in the Pereiaslav Cossack Regiment, he became a close associate of Bohdan Khmelnytsky and was said to have been a constant companion to the hetman. In April 1648, together with B. Tovpiga, a centurion of the Cherkasy regiment, he led an uprising of Registered Cossacks at Kamiana Zavod.

In 1648, he was appointed colonel of the Kropyvniansky (Ichniansky) regiment. He took part in several battles, including the Battle of Zhovti Vody in 1648; the Battle of Korsun; the Battle of Pyliavtsi in 1648; and the Battle of Zboriv in 1649. He also took part in important diplomatic missions to Turkey. In October–November 1648, Dzhulaibek led a Ukrainian diplomatic mission to Constantinople but it was unsuccessful.

In September 1650, Dzhulaibek led the Ukrainian embassy to the Moldovian lord Vasile Lupul. At the Battle of Berestechko in 1651, he was elected hetman of the Cossack officers and appointed captain general of the hetman. During a starshyna council in 1653 he supported a union with the sultan. After 1654, he spent a long time with his family in Sahunivka (Cherkasy region, Ukraine). His fate after 1684 is unknown.

== Literature ==
- История Ивана Франко
- Научные Записки № 39
- «Козацька еліта», НАН України, інститут політичних і етнонаціональних досліджень ім. І.Ф. Кураса, УДК 94(477)929
- Суспільно-політична сітуація в Україні у другій половині XVII—XVIIIст.
