= Crown Army =

Land service branch of the Crown of the Kingdom of Poland

- Royal Banner of Polish–Lithuanian Commonwealth.
- Active: 1569–1795
- Country: Poland–Lithuania
- Type: Army
- Role: Land combat
- Part of: Military of the Polish–Lithuanian Commonwealth

The Crown Army (Polish: Armia koronna) was the land service branch of the military forces of the Crown of the Kingdom of Poland in the Polish–Lithuanian Commonwealth. It existed from the establishment of the federation in 1569 until the Third Partition of Poland in 1795.

== Bibliography ==
- Mariusz Machynia, Czesław Srzednicki: Oficerowie Rzeczypospolitej Obojga Narodów 1717-1794, vol.1 1: Oficerowie wojska koronnego, part 1: Sztaby i kawaleria. Kraków: Księgarnia Akademicka. Wydawnictwo Naukowe, 2002. ISBN 83-71-88-500-8.
- Gembarzewski, Bronisław (1925), Rodowody pułków polskich i oddziałów równorzędnych od r. 1717 do r. 1831 (in Polish), Warszawa: Towarzystwo Wiedzy Wojskowej
