= Stanisław Lanckoroński (hetman) =

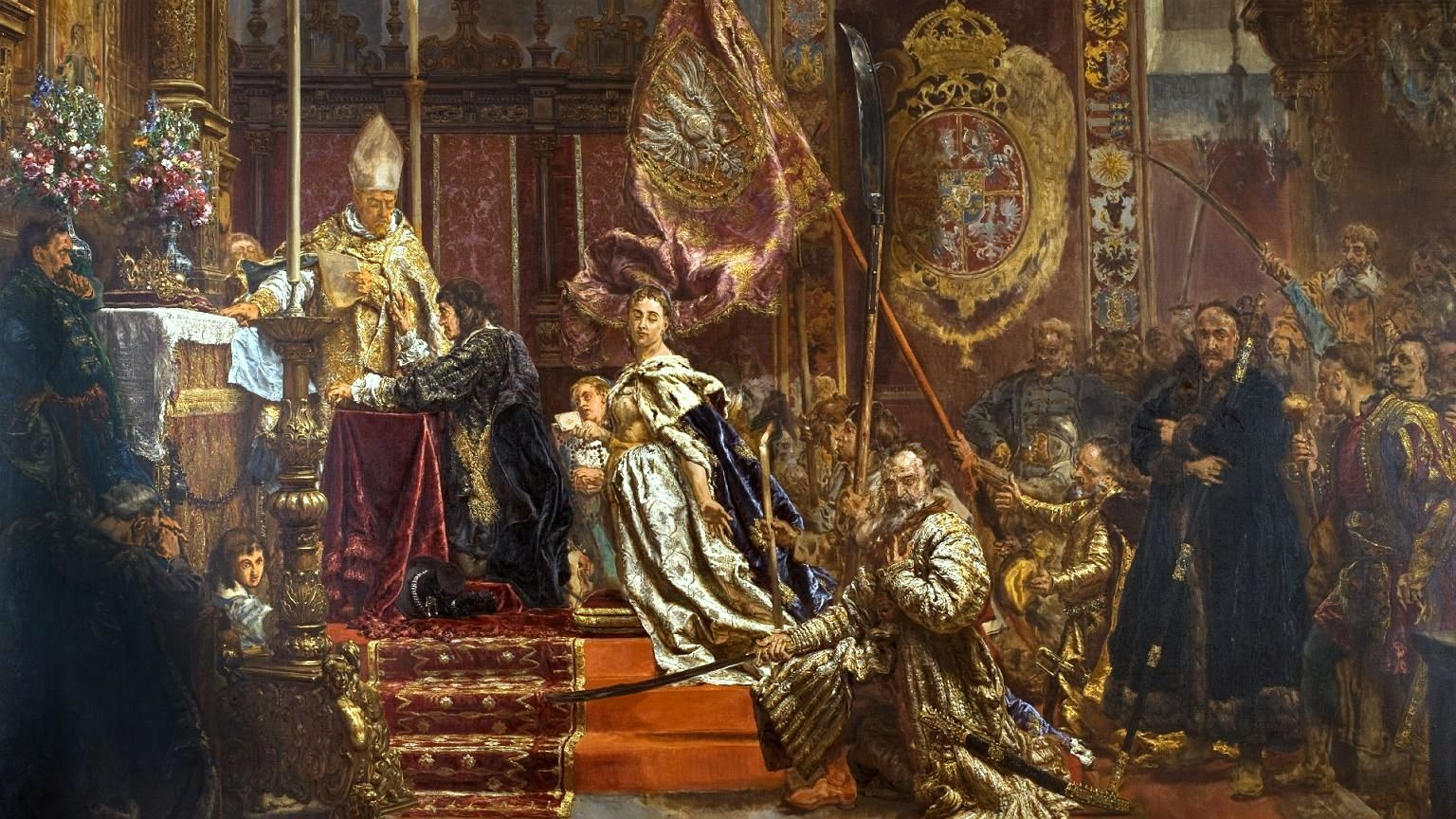
- Coat of arms: Zadora
- Born: c. 1597
- Died: 1657
- Noble family: Lanckoroński
- Consort: Anna Sienieńska
- Father: Jan Lanckoroński
- Mother: Barbara Kalinowska

Stanisław Lanckoroński (c. 1597–1657) was a Polish magnate as well as a politician and military commander.

Stanisław became starosta of Skała in 1641, castellan of Halych in 1646, castellan of Kamienets, voivode of Bracław Voivodeship and Grand Regimentarz of the Crown in 1649, voivode of Ruthenian Voivodeship in 1652, Field Crown Hetman from 1654 until 19 February 1657 and starost of Stobnice and Dymirsk.

He was married to Anna Sienieńska and had eight children: Hieronim, Przecław, Franciszek Stanisław, Jan, Zbigniew, Mikołaj, Marcin, Barbara, and Joanna.
