= 1649 =

1649 in various calendars
- Gregorian calendar: 1649; MDCXLIX
- Ab urbe condita: 2402
- Armenian calendar: 1098; ԹՎ ՌՂԸ
- Assyrian calendar: 6399
- Balinese saka calendar: 1570–1571
- Bengali calendar: 1055–1056
- Berber calendar: 2599
- English Regnal year: 24 Cha. 1 – 1 Cha. 2 (Interregnum)
- Buddhist calendar: 2193
- Burmese calendar: 1011
- Byzantine calendar: 7157–7158
- Chinese calendar: 戊子年 (Earth Rat); 4346 or 4139 — to — 己丑年 (Earth Ox); 4347 or 4140
- Coptic calendar: 1365–1366
- Discordian calendar: 2815
- Ethiopian calendar: 1641–1642
- Hebrew calendar: 5409–5410
- Hindu calendars
- Vikram Samvat: 1705–1706
- Shaka Samvat: 1570–1571
- Kali Yuga: 4749–4750
- Holocene calendar: 11649
- Igbo calendar: 649–650
- Iranian calendar: 1027–1028
- Islamic calendar: 1058–1059
- Japanese calendar: Keian 2 (慶安２年)
- Javanese calendar: 1570–1571
- Julian calendar: Gregorian minus 10 days
- Korean calendar: 3982
- Minguo calendar: 263 before ROC 民前263年
- Nanakshahi calendar: 181
- Thai solar calendar: 2191–2192
- Tibetan calendar: ས་ཕོ་བྱི་བ་ལོ་ (male Earth-Rat); 1775 or 1394 or 622 — to — ས་མོ་གླང་ལོ་ (female Earth-Ox); 1776 or 1395 or 623

May 19: England is made a parliamentary republic by vote of the House of Commons, with Oliver Cromwell as the chief executive (as "Lord Protector") of the Commonwealth of England.

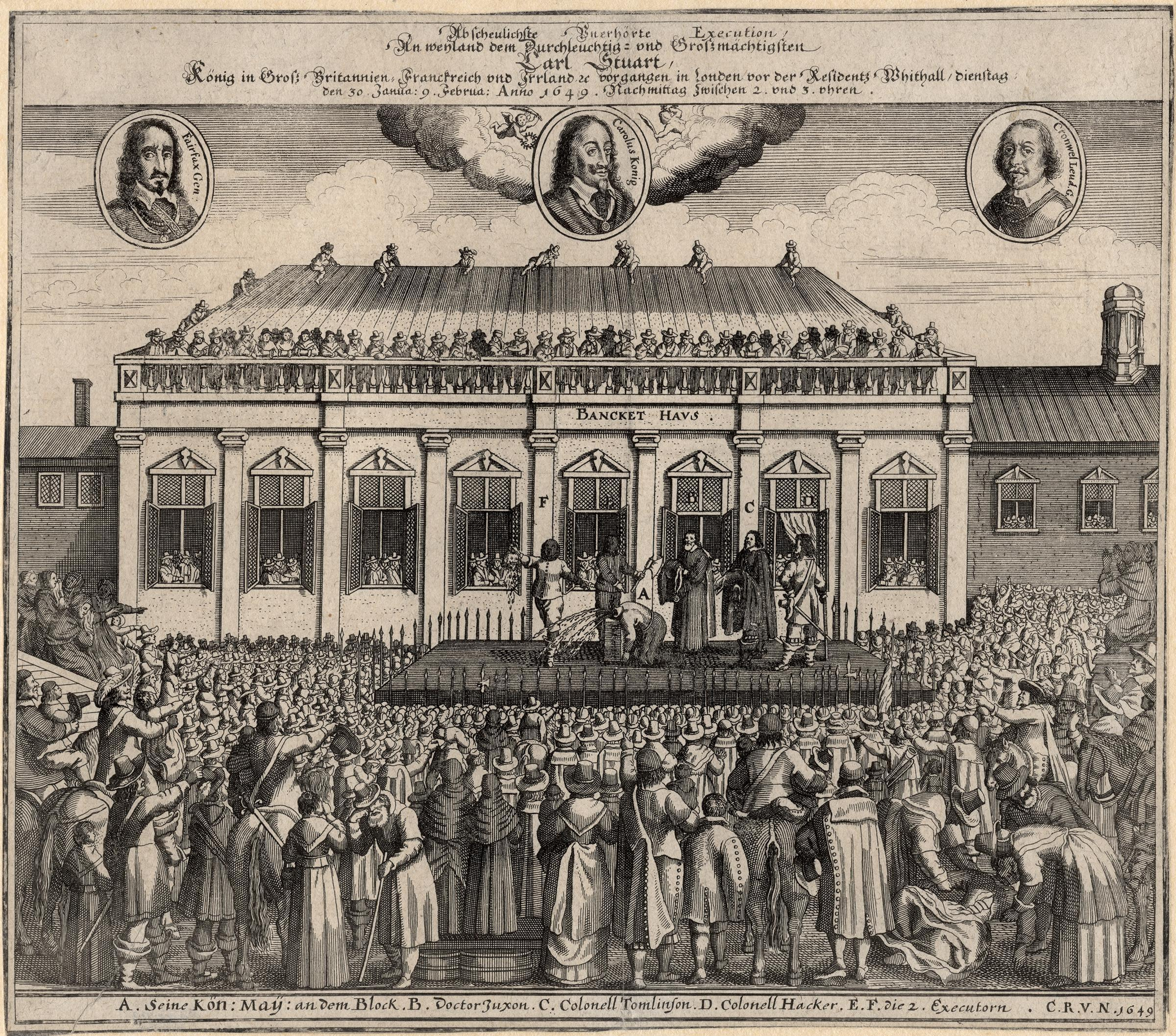
January 30: Former King Charles of England is beheaded as Parliament prepares to abolish the monarchy

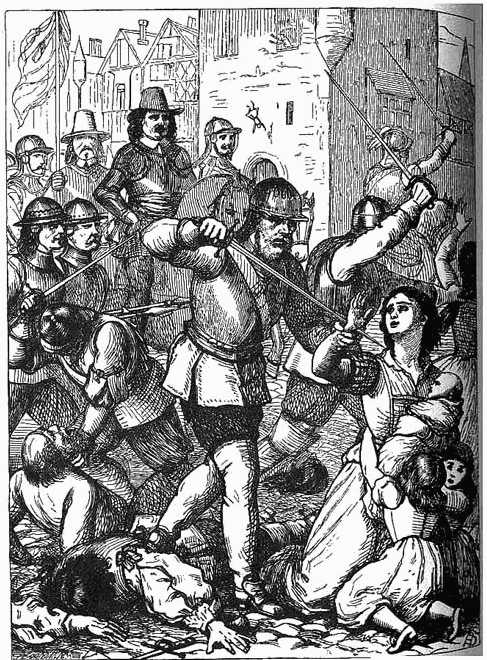
September 3–11: Siege of Drogheda

1649 (MDCXLIX) was a common year starting on Friday of the Gregorian calendar and a common year starting on Monday of the Julian calendar, the 1649th year of the Common Era (CE) and Anno Domini (AD) designations, the 649th year of the 2nd millennium, the 49th year of the 17th century, and the 10th and last year of the 1640s decade. As of the start of 1649, the Gregorian calendar was 10 days ahead of the Julian calendar, which remained in localized use until 1923.

== Events ==
=== January–March ===
- January 4 – In England, the Rump Parliament passes an ordinance to set up a High Court of Justice, to try Charles I for high treason.
- January 17 – The Second Ormonde Peace concludes an alliance between the Irish Royalists and the Irish Confederates during the War of the Three Kingdoms. Later in the year the alliance is decisively defeated during the Cromwellian conquest of Ireland.
- January 20 – Charles I of England goes on trial, for treason and other "high crimes".
- January 27 – King Charles I of England, Scotland and Ireland is found guilty of high treason in a public session.
- January 29 – Serfdom in Russia begins legally as the Sobornoye Ulozheniye (Соборное уложение, "Code of Law") is signed by members of the Zemsky Sobor, the parliament of the estates of the realm in the Tsardom of Russia. Slaves and free peasants are consolidated by law into the new hereditary class of "serfs", and the Russian nobility are given the exclusive privilege of owning the serfs.
- January 30 – The deposed King Charles I is beheaded outside the Banquet Hall in the Palace of Whitehall, London. The Commonwealth of England, with a republican form of government, replaces the monarchy as the form of government of England and members of the Long Parliament serve as government. Charles, Prince of Wales declares himself as King of England, Scotland and Ireland pending restoration of the monarchy.
- February 5 – In Edinburgh, the Scottish Parliament declares Prince Charles, son of the recently executed King Charles I, as King Charles II of Scotland. Prince Charles, at the time, is at sea in charge of royalist forces fighting to drive Oliver Cromwell from the British Isles. Scotland is the first of the three Kingdoms to recognize his claim to the throne.
- February 7 – The English Parliament rejects a proposal to continue the English monarchy after Oliver Cromwell makes clear that he does not wish to be crowned as King of England.
- February 22 – The Mughal–Safavid War begins when Shah Abbas II of the Safavid Empire in Persia captures the Afghan city of Kandahar from the Mughal Empire of India after a six-week siege. The Mughals, led by Shah Jahan, fail to recapture Kandahar after three sieges in four years.
- March 4 – The first ever set of rules and regulations for England's Parliamentary Navy, Robert Blake's The Laws of War and Ordinances of the Sea, is adopted by the House of Commons, and Blake is promoted to the position of General at Sea of the English fleet.
- March 11 – The rebel Frondeurs and the French government sign the Peace of Rueil.
- March 15 – The city of Lappeenranta (Swedish: Villmanstrand) is founded by Queen Christina of Sweden.
- March 16 – An over 1,000 strong war party of Haudenosaunee Iroquois invade and burn the Huron mission villages of St. Ignace and St. Louis in present-day Simcoe County, Ontario, killing about 300 people.
- March 17
  - The English Parliament, having voted February 7 against a proposal to continue the monarchy under Oliver Cromwell, passes the "Act Abolishing the Kingship" with the goal of creating a republic under a Lord Protector selected by an elected Parliament.
  - French colonists from Martinique, led by former Martinique Governor Jacques Dyel du Parquet, land at St. Georges Harbour on the island of Grenada for the founding of Fort Annunciation. The fort is soon abandoned and the colonists cross the harbour for the founding of Fort Royal which eventually becomes the city of St. George's, Grenada
- March 19 – The House of Commons of England passes an act abolishing the House of Lords, which it describes in the act as "useless and dangerous to the people of England".

=== April–June ===
- April 21 – The Maryland Toleration Act is passed in the American colony, allowing all freedom of worship.
- May 1 – The Wendat people Indian tribe complete the burning of 15 of their own villages, to prevent their stores from being taken by the Haudenasaunee Iroquois. Almost all the remaining people (approximately 10,000) become refugees, on a path that eventually brings them to Wendake.
- May 17 – The Banbury mutiny in England ends – leaders of the Leveller mutineers in the New Model Army are hanged.
- May 19 – "An act declaring England to be a Commonwealth" is passed by the Rump Parliament.
- May 22–October – Robert Blake blockades Prince Rupert's fleet in Kinsale, Ireland.
- June 1
  - Alexis, Tsar of the Russian Empire orders all English merchants to leave Moscow.
  - The Sumuroy Revolt begins in Northern Samar as Agustin Sumuroy, a Waray, and some of his followers rebel against the polo y servicio (forced labor system).

=== July–September ===
- July 5 – After news reaches the Western Hemisphere that King Charles I has been deposed and executed, the English colonial government of the Somers Isles, now called Bermuda, proclaims its recognition of Charles II as the rightful ruler of the islands.
- July 27 – The Commonwealth of England Parliament passes the "Act for the promoting and propagating the Gospel of Jesus Christ in New England" to create the "Company for Propagation of the Gospel in New England and the parts adjacent in America" for Christian missionary ministries to Native American tribes. The New England Company will continue to operate more than three and a half centuries later.
- July 31 – Ukrainian Cossack troops under the command of Mykhailo Krychevsky and Stepan Pobodailo are overwhelmed in the Battle of Loyew (in what is now Belarus) by a smaller force of Polish-Lithuanian Commonwealth soldiers led by Lithuania's Janusz Radziwiłł, with the Cossacks losing more than 3,000 fighters. Krychevsky is mortally wounded and dies on August 3.
- August 8 – Dubhaltach Mac Fhirbhisigh completes Book VIII of Leabhar na nGenealach, in Galway, within days of an outbreak of the plague.
- August 17 – The Treaty of Zboriv is signed by representatives of King John II Casimir of Poland and the representatives of the Cossacks and Crimean Khanate to partially settle the Khmelnytsky Uprising.
- August 15 – Oliver Cromwell lands in Dublin, unopposed and with thousands of English troops, to begin the Cromwellian conquest of Ireland.
- August 26 – After his "True Levellers", commonly called "The Diggers", abandon their last major colony at St. George's Hill at Weybridge in England, their leader, Gerrard Winstanley, publishes the pamphlet "A Watch-Word to The City of London, and the Armie", recounting the experience.
- September 2 – The Italian city of Castro is completely destroyed by the forces of Pope Innocent X, ending the Wars of Castro.
- September 3 – Oliver Cromwell leads England's New Model Army to start the Siege of Drogheda in Ireland, and breaks through on September 11, executing the last of the original 2,550 Irish Catholic defenders and their leader, the English Royalist Sir Arthur Aston.
- September 30 – The last of Sweden's troops vacate Prague.

=== October–December ===
- October 11 – The Sack of Wexford in Ireland ends after having started on October 2, with Cromwell's New Model Army breaking through, killing more than 1,500 Irish Catholic defenders and civilians, while losing only 20 of the English soldiers. The capture of Wexford ends the remaining chance that Charles II, heir to the English throne, can land troops in Ireland, and Charles and the royalist fleet flee to Portugal.
- November 24 – The first phase of the Siege of Waterford begins as Cromwell's New Model Army attempts to take on the strategically-located Irish city's defenders with his own exhausted army. Cromwell is forced to call off the siege after eight days and his army retreats to its winter quarters at Dungarvan on December 2.
- December 6 – The Scottish defenders of Ireland are defeated by Cromwell's forces in the Battle of Lisnagarvey in County Antrim, with 1,500 Scots killed or captured, and New Model Army battalion of Colonel Robert Venables suffering minimal losses. The battle ends the Scottish presence in Ireland and settlers are expelled from the island in the days that follow.
- December 20 – The Puritan law enforcers of the Commonwealth of England raid the Red Bull Theatre in London for violations of the laws against performance of plays and arrest the actors, as well as confiscating their property.
- December 30 – Chinese General Geng Zhongming, having reported to the Qing dynasty commanders to face charges of harboring runaway slaves during his fight against the Southern Ming dynasty troops, commits suicide while waiting for a verdict in his court-martial. (1943). His son, Geng Jimao, continues to fight against the Southern Ming.

=== Undated ===
- Qing armies reconquer Jiangxi province during the Manchu conquest of China.
- The town of Kristinestad, named after Queen Christina of Sweden, is founded in Ostrobothnia by Count Per Brahe the Younger.
- Dutch artist Frans Hals paints a portrait of René Descartes.

== Births ==
=== January–March ===
- January 12 – Jacques Carrey, French painter (d. 1726)
- January 18
  - William Maurice, Prince of Nassau-Siegen (1679–1691) (d. 1691)
  - John Waddon, English politician (d. 1695)
- January 22 – Pascal Collasse, French composer (d. 1709)
- January 30 – Lionel Tollemache, 3rd Earl of Dysart, British politician and nobleman (d. 1727)
- February 6
  - John Benedict, Connecticut politician and deacon (d. 1729)
  - Augusta Marie of Holstein-Gottorp, Consort of Frederick VII, Margrave of Baden-Durlach (d. 1728)
- February 8 – Gabriel Daniel, French Jesuit historian (d. 1728)
- February 11 – William Carstares, Scottish minister (d. 1715)
- February 16 – Antonio Lupis, prolific Italian writer (d. 1701)
- February 19 – Daniel Erich, German organist and composer (d. 1712)
- February 22 – Bon Boullogne, French painter (d. 1717)
- February 25 – Johann Philipp Krieger, German Baroque composer (d. 1725)
- March 2 – Andreas Gottlieb von Bernstorff, German politician (d. 1726)
- March 3 – John Floyer, English physician and author (d. 1734)
- March 12 – Govert Bidloo, Dutch physician, anatomist, poet and playwright (d. 1713)
- March 13 – Simon Henry, Count of Lippe-Detmold (1666–1697) (d. 1697)
- March 19 – Marie Morin, New France nun and historian (d. 1730)
- March 30 – John Trenchard, English politician (d. 1695)

=== April–June ===
- April 5 – Elihu Yale, American benefactor of Yale University (d. 1721)
- April 8 – Charles Berkeley, 2nd Earl of Berkeley, English diplomat (d. 1710)
- April 9 – James Scott, 1st Duke of Monmouth, claimant to the thrones of England, Scotland and Ireland (d. 1685)
- April 11 – Princess Frederica Amalia of Denmark, daughter of King Frederick III of Denmark (d. 1704)
- April 16 – Jan Luyken, Dutch engraver (d. 1712)
- April 17 – Charles Henri, Prince of Commercy (d. 1723)
- April 23 – Andreas Kneller, German organist and composer (d. 1724)
- May 2
  - Engel de Ruyter, Dutch admiral (d. 1683)
  - Joseph Ball, American settler, public servant, and maternal grandfather of George Washington (d. 1711)
- May 3 – Johann Valentin Meder, German composer (d. 1719)
- May 4
  - Chhatrasal, Maharaja of Madhya Pradesh (d. 1731)
  - Augustinus Terwesten, Northern Netherlandish painter (d. 1711)
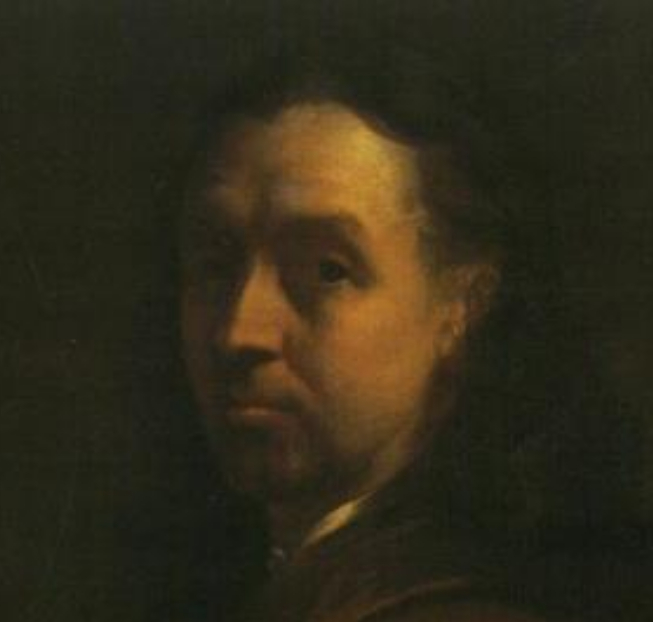
    Augustinus Terwesten
- May 15 – Vincent Bigot, Superior general of the Jesuit mission in Canada (d. 1720)
- June 13 – Adrien Baillet, French scholar and critic (d. 1706)

=== July–September ===
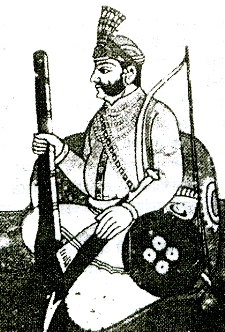
Chhatrasal

- July 1 – Johann Wilhelm Petersen, German theologian (d. 1727)
- July 4
  - Sophie Amalie Lindenov, Danish noblewoman and landowner (d. 1688)
  - William Lodge, English engraver and printmaker (d. 1689)
- July 19 – Charles, Landgrave of Hesse-Wanfried since 1676 (d. 1711)
- July 20 – William Bentinck, 1st Earl of Portland (d. 1709)
- July 23 – Pope Clement XI (d. 1721)
- August 3 – Diego de Salinas, Governor of Gibraltar (d. 1720)
- August 7 – Archduke Charles Joseph of Austria, Roman Catholic bishop (d. 1664)
- August 16 – Barent van Kalraet, Dutch painter (d. 1737)
- August 27 – Ferdinando d'Adda, Italian Catholic cardinal (d. 1719)

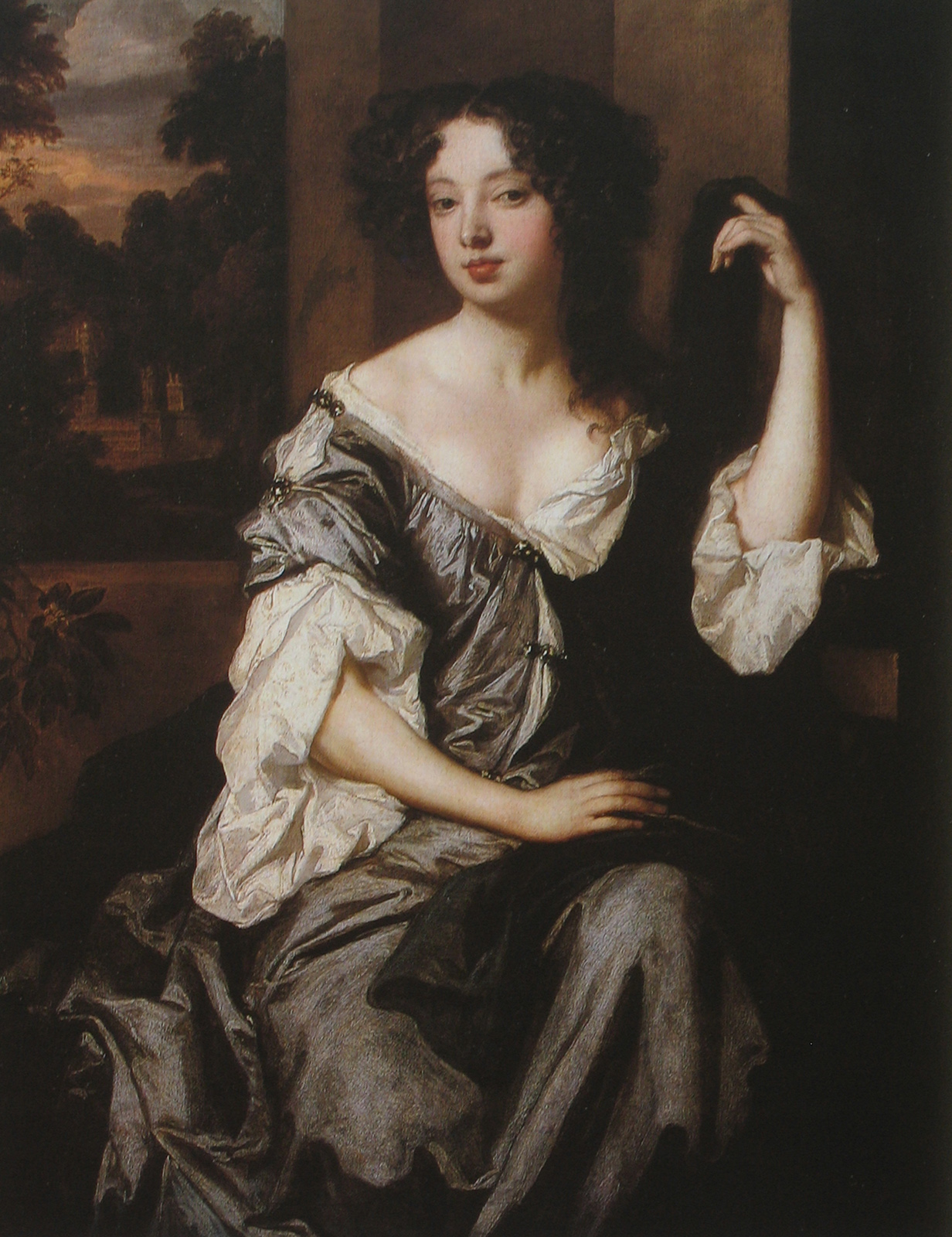
Louise de Kérouaille, Duchess of Portsmouth

- September 5 – Louise de Kérouaille, Duchess of Portsmouth, French-born mistress of Charles II of England (d. 1734)
- September 7 – Charles Lambart, 3rd Earl of Cavan, Irish peer (d. 1702)
- September 10 – Bernhard I, Duke of Saxe-Meiningen since 1675 (d. 1706)
- September 12
  - Sir Thomas Blount, 1st Baronet, English politician (d. 1687)
  - Dionysius Andreas Freher, German mystic (d. 1728)
  - Giuseppe Maria Tomasi, Sicilian saint (d. 1713)
- September 14 – Magdalena Stenbock, Swedish salon hostess (d. 1727)
- September 15 – Titus Oates, English clergyman and plotter (d. 1705)
- September 20 – Carr Scrope, English poet (d. 1680)
- September 25 – Edward Montagu, British politician (d. 1690)
- September 26 – Katharyne Lescailje, Dutch writer (d. 1711)
- September 27 – Jonas Danilssønn Ramus, Norwegian priest and historian (d. 1718)

=== October–December ===
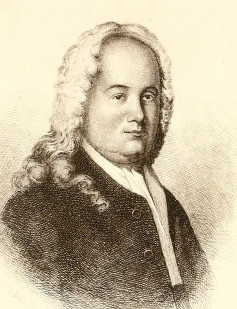
Samuel Carpenter

- October 3 – Franz Mozart, German mason, great-grandfather of Wolfgang Amadeus Mozart (d. 1693)
- October 6 – Juana Rangel de Cuéllar, Spanish founder of Colombian city (d. 1736)
- October 12 – Sir Thomas Felton, 4th Baronet, English politician (d. 1709)
- October 19 – Samuel Rodigast, German poet, hymnwriter (d. 1708)
- October 25 – Sir Edward Blackett, 2nd Baronet, English politician (d. 1718)
- November 2
  - Johann Adolf I, Duke of Saxe-Weissenfels, German duke (d. 1697)
  - Esmé Stewart, 2nd Duke of Richmond, son of James Stewart (d. 1660)
- November 4 – Samuel Carpenter, Deputy Governor of colonial Pennsylvania (d. 1714)
- November 24 – John Holwell, English mathematician, astrologer (d. 1680)
- December 2 – Jean-Baptiste Corneille, French historical painter, etcher and engraver (d. 1695)
- December 9 – Sir Orlando Bridgeman, 1st Baronet, of Ridley (d. 1701)

=== Date unknown ===
- Esther Liebmann, German banker (d. 1714)

== Deaths ==
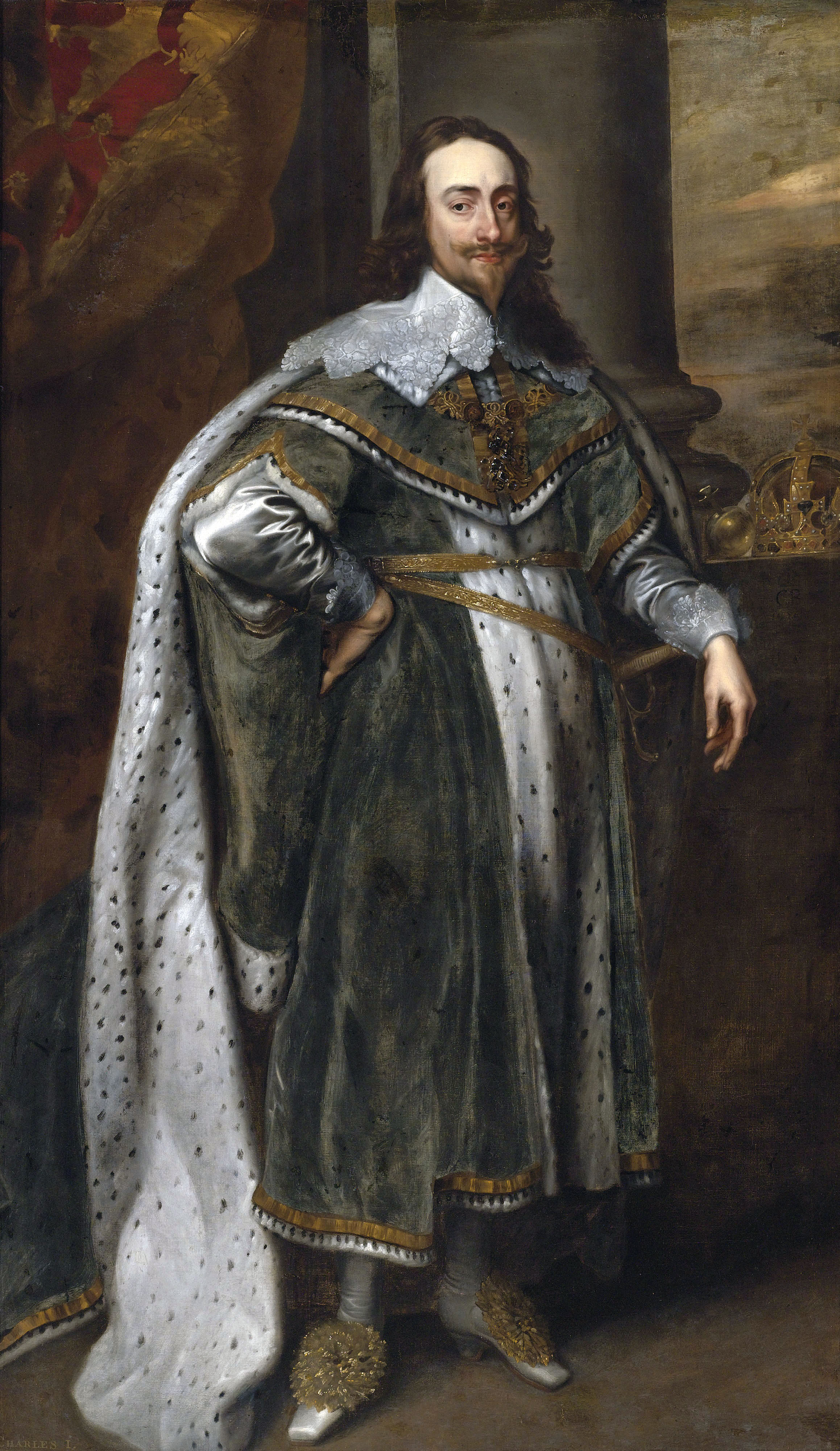
Charles I of England died 30 January

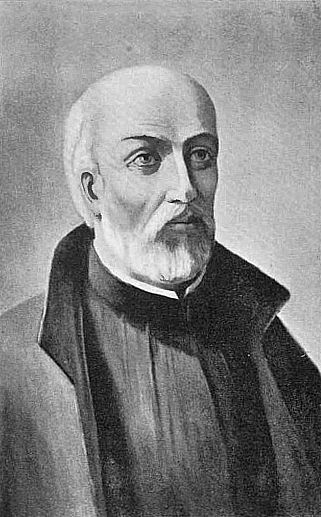
Jean de Brébeuf died 16 March

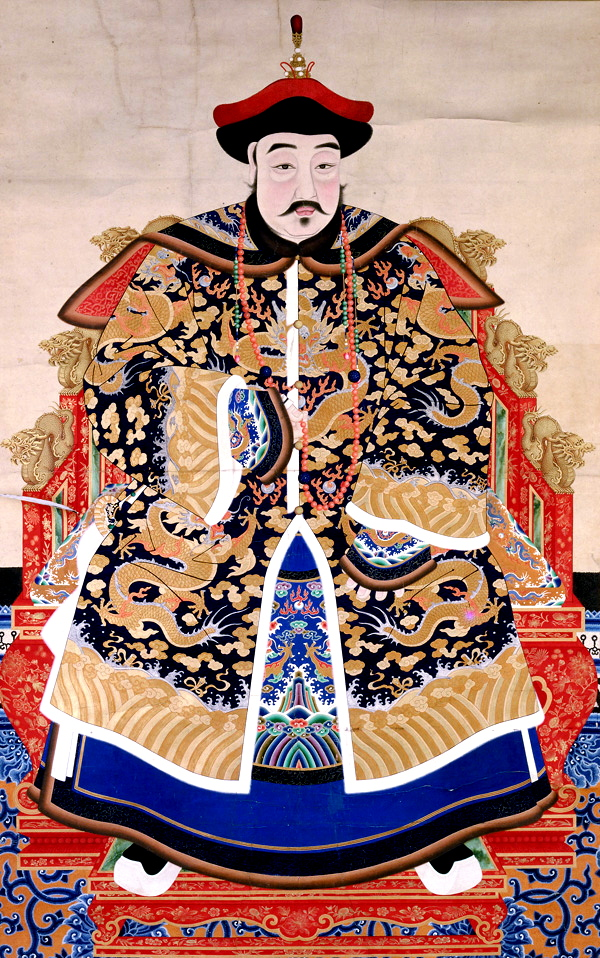
Dodo, Prince Yu died 29 April

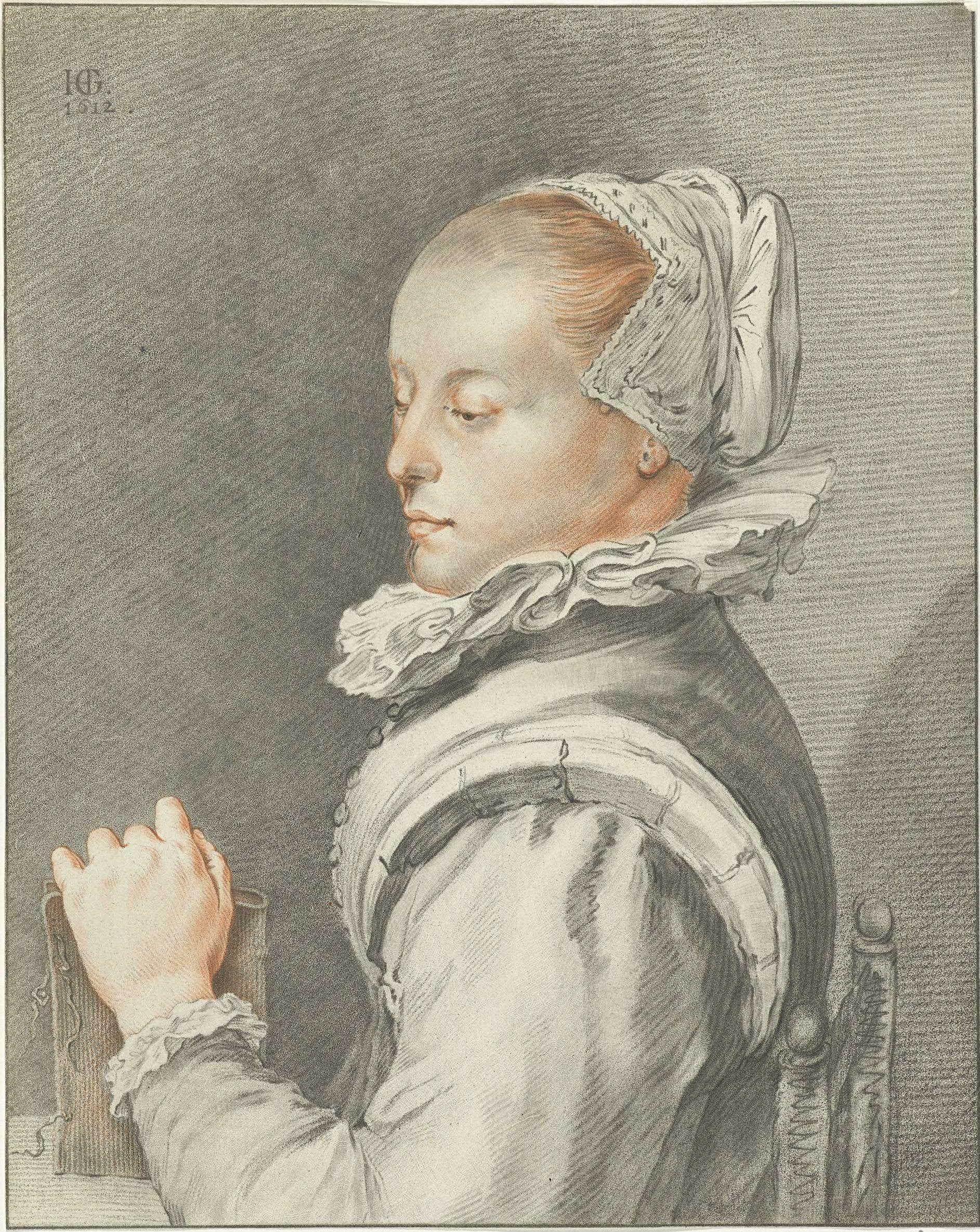
Maria Tesselschade Visscher died 20 June

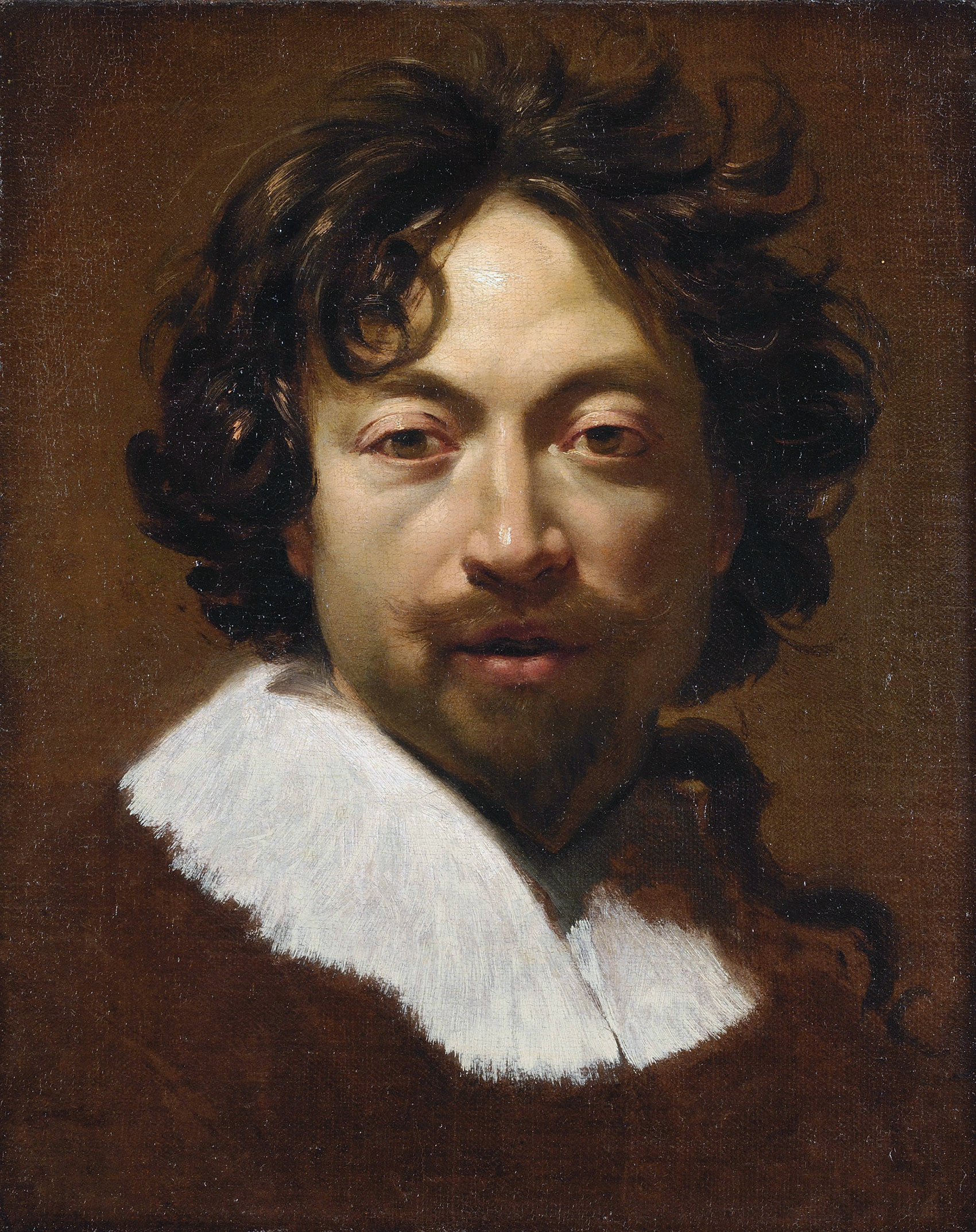
Simon Vouet died 30 June

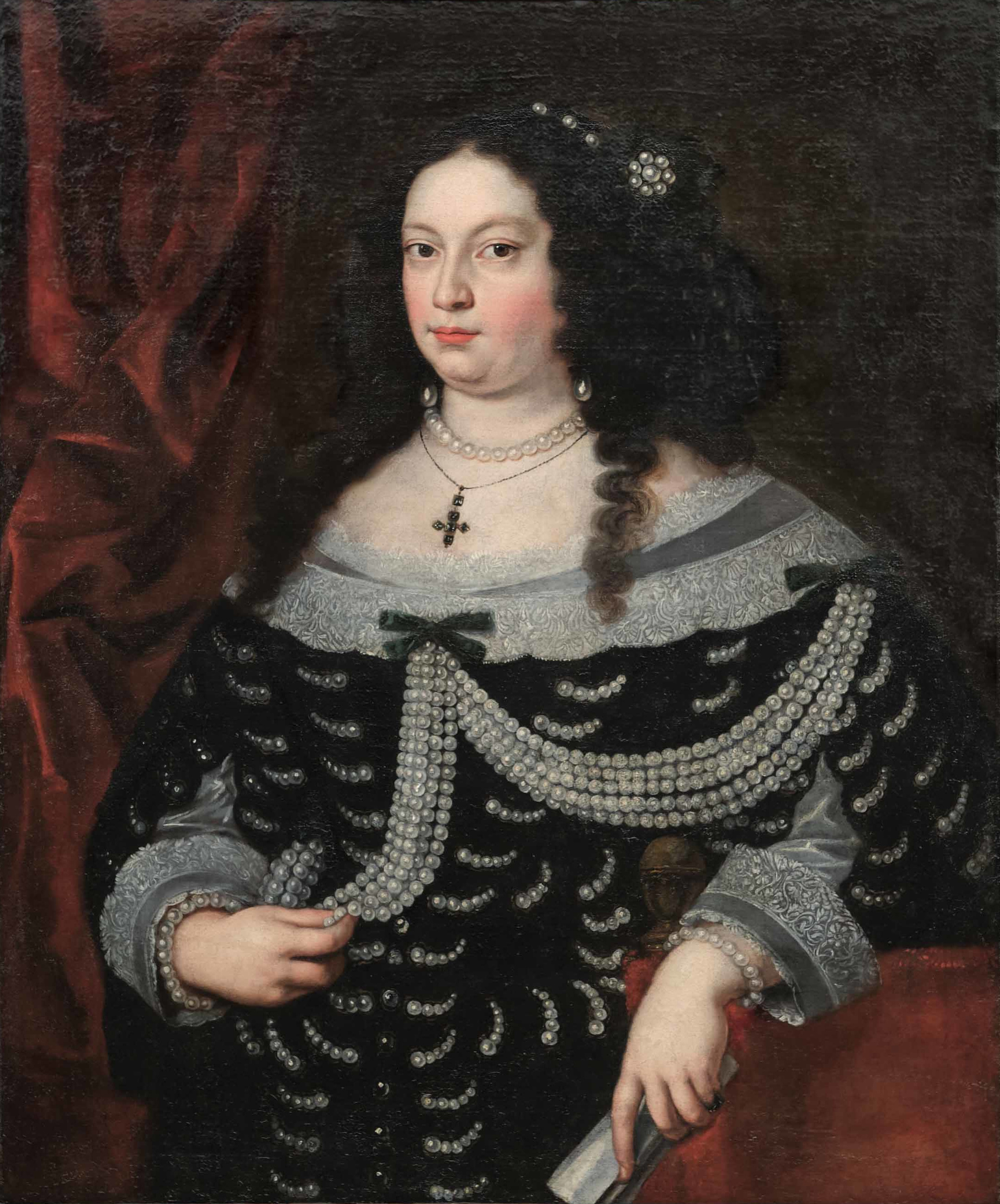
Vittoria Farnese d'Este died 10 August

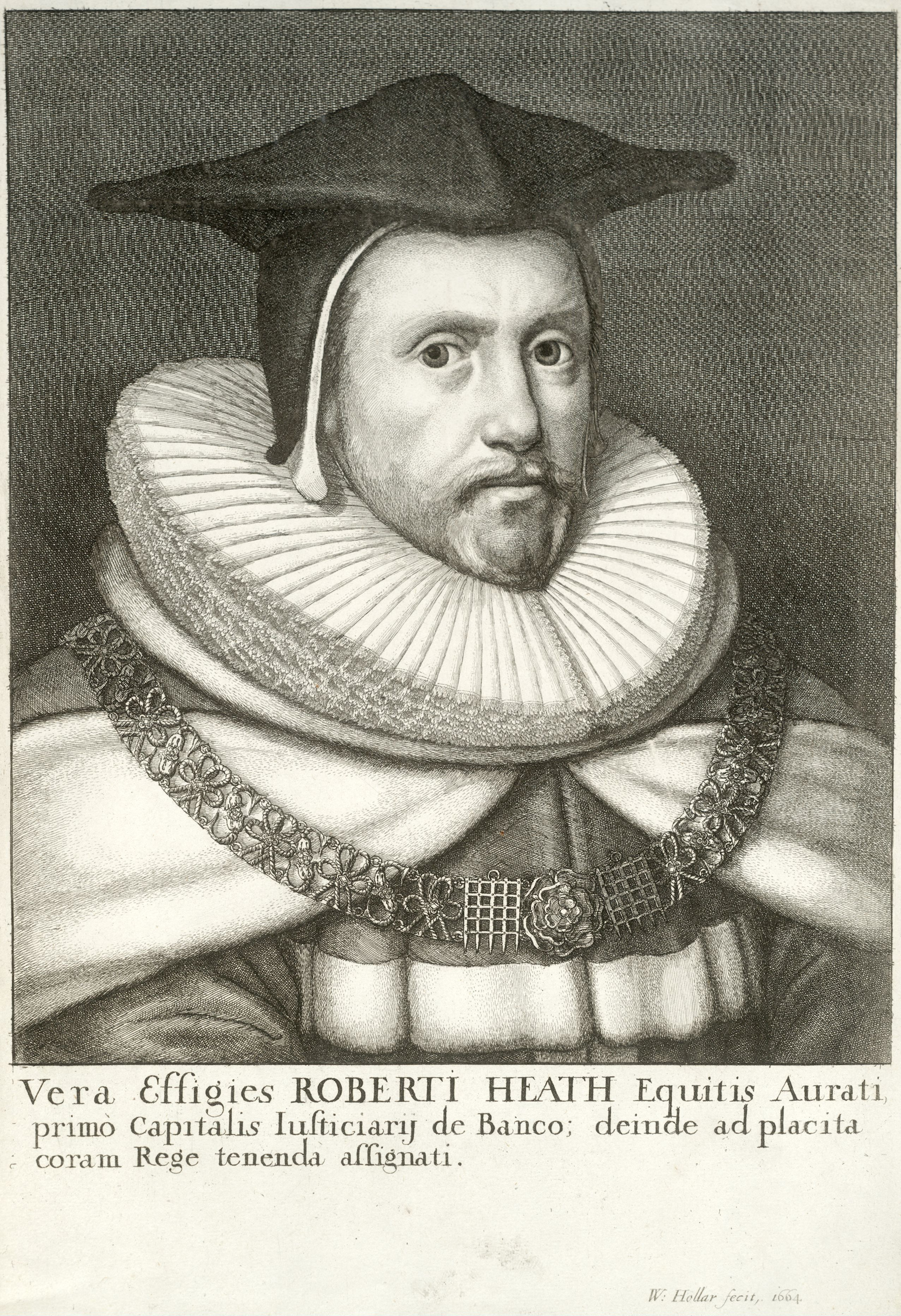
Robert Heath died 30 August

=== January–March ===
- January 6 – Nicolaus Vernulaeus, professor at the University of Leuven and an important Neo-Latin playwright (b. 1583)
- January 21 – García de Toledo Osorio, 6th Marquis of Villafranca, Spanish noble and politician (b. 1579)
- January 22
  - Pace Giordano, Roman Catholic prelate, Bishop of Trogir (b. 1586)
  - Alessandro Turchi, Italian painter of the early Baroque (b. 1578)
- January 30 – King Charles I of England, Scotland, and Ireland (executed) (b. 1600)
- February 7 – Giovanni Tommaso Malloni, Roman Catholic prelate, Bishop of Belluno and of Šibenik (b. 1579)
- February 18 – Cristóbal Pérez Lazarraga y Maneli Viana, Roman Catholic prelate, Bishop of Cartagena in Colombia and of Chiapas (b. 1599)
- February 23 – Elisabeth Magdalena of Pomerania, German duchess (b. 1580)
- March 2 – Archduchess Maria of Austria (b. 1584)
- March 9
  - Arthur Capell, 1st Baron Capell of Hadham (b. 1608)
  - James Hamilton, 1st Duke of Hamilton, Scottish statesman (b. 1606)
  - Henry Rich, 1st Earl of Holland, English soldier (executed) (b. 1590)
- March 16 – Jean de Brébeuf, French Jesuit missionary (b. 1593)
- March 17 – Gabriel Lalemant, Jesuit missionary in New France, beginning in 1646 (b. 1610)
- March 19 – Gerhard Johann Vossius, German classical scholar and theologian (b. 1577)
- March 20 – Juan Gutiérrez, Roman Catholic prelate, Bishop of Vigevano (b. 1578)
- March 22 – Agostinho Barbosa, Portuguese bishop in Italy and writer on canon law (b. 1589)
- March 26 – John Winthrop, first Governor of Massachusetts Bay Colony (b. c. 1587)

=== April–June ===
- April 5 – George Hakewill, English clergyman and author (b. 1578)
- April 11 – Ambrose Corbie, English Jesuit teacher (b. 1604)
- April 22 – Marcos de Torres y Rueda, interim viceroy of New Spain (b. 1591)
- April 24
  - Francesco Ingoli, Italian priest (b. 1578)
  - Gaston Jean Baptiste de Renty, French aristocrat and philanthropist (b. 1611)
- April 29 – Dodo, Prince Yu (b. 1614)
- May 8 – Gian Giacomo Cristoforo, Roman Catholic prelate, Bishop of Lacedonia (b. 1588)
- May 14
  - Friedrich Spanheim, Dutch theologian (b. 1600)
  - William Chappell, Irish bishop (b. 1582)
- May 28 – Empress Xiaoduanwen of the Qing Dynasty (b. 1600)
- June 3 – Manuel de Faria e Sousa, Portuguese historian and poet (b. 1590)
- June 6 – Vincenzo Carafa, Italian Jesuit priest and spiritual writer (b. 1585)
- June 17 – Injo of Joseon, sixteenth king of the Joseon dynasty in Korea (b. 1595)
- June 18 – Juan Martínez Montañés, Spanish sculptor (b. 1568)
- June 20 – Maria Tesselschade Visscher, Dutch poet and engraver (b. 1594)
- June 30 – Simon Vouet, French painter (b. 1590)
- June 27 – Chikurin-in, Japanese woman of the late Azuchi-Momoyama through early Edo period (b. 1579)

=== July–September ===
- July 11 – Susanna Hall, oldest child of William Shakespeare and Anne Hathaway (b. 1582)
- July 20 – Padovanino, Italian painter (b. 1588)
- July 22 – Alessandro Castracani, Roman Catholic prelate, Bishop of Fano (b. 1580)
- July 23 – Anne Arundell (b. c. 1615)
- July 25 – Orazio Giustiniani, Italian Catholic cardinal (b. 1580)
- August 7 – Maria Leopoldine of Austria, Holy Roman Empress (b. 1632)
- August 10 – Vittoria Farnese d'Este, Duchess of Modena and Reggio (b. 1618)
- August 15 – Dorothea of Brunswick-Lüneburg, Spouse of Charles I, Count Palatine of Zweibrücken-Birkenfeld (b. 1570)
- August 21 – Richard Crashaw, English poet (b. c. 1613)
- August 25 – Thomas Shepard, American Puritan minister (b. 1605)
- August 27 – Catherine of Brandenburg, Princess of Transylvania (1629–1630) (b. 1604)
- August 28 – John Guthrie, Scottish prelate (b. 1580)
- August 30 – Robert Heath, English judge and politician (b. 1575)
- September 6 – Robert Dudley, styled Earl of Warwick, English explorer and geographer (b. 1574)
- September 15 – John Floyd, English Jesuit preacher (b. 1572)

=== October–December ===
- October 3 – Giovanni Diodati, Swiss Protestant clergyman (b. 1576)
- October 16 – Isaac van Ostade, Dutch painter (b. 1621)
- October 28
  - Lady Blanche Arundell, English defender of Wardour Castle (b. 1583)
  - Ludovico Ridolfi, Roman Catholic prelate who served as Bishop of Patti (1649) (b. 1587)
- October 30 – Honoré d'Albert (b. 1581)
- November 6 – Owen Roe O'Neill (b. c. 1585)
- November 11 – Ellen Marsvin, Danish noble, landowner and county administrator (b. 1572)
- November 19 – Caspar Schoppe, German scholar (b. 1576)
- November 21 – Jaroslav Borzita of Martinice, Bohemian noble (b. 1582)
- December 2 – Theodorus Schrevelius, Dutch writer and poet (b. 1572)
- December 4 – William Drummond of Hawthornden, Scottish poet (b. 1585)
- December 7 – Charles Garnier, French Jesuit missionary (b. 1606)
- December 8
  - Noël Chabanel, French Jesuit missionary (b. 1613)
  - Martin Rinkart, German clergyman and hymnist (b. 1586)
