= Battle of Loyew =

Battle of Loyew (Łojów) can refer to two battles of the Khmelnytsky Uprising:

- Battle of Loyew (1649)
- Battle of Loyew (1651)
