= Kuzma Sinilov =

- Native name: Кузьма Романович Синилов
- Born: 14 May 1902; Byvalki, Loyew District,
- Died: 27 December 1957 (aged 55) Moscow, Russia
- Buried: Novodevichy Cemetery
- Allegiance: Soviet Union
- Branch: Soviet Army
- Service years: 1919–1957
- Rank: Lieutenant general
- Commands: Military Commandant of Moscow
- Conflicts: Russian Civil War; Sino-Soviet conflict (1929); Winter War
- Awards: Order of Lenin, Order of the Red Banner, Order of the Patriotic War, Order of the Red Star, Jubilee Medal "XX Years of the Workers' and Peasants' Red Army", Medal "For the Defence of Moscow", Medal "For the Defence of the Soviet Transarctic", Medal "For the Victory over Germany in the Great Patriotic War 1941–1945", Order of the White Lion, Czechoslovak War Cross 1939–1945, Order of Polonia Restituta

Kuzma Romanovich Sinilov (Russian: Кузьма Романович Синилов; May 14, 1902 – December 27, 1957) was a Soviet Lieutenant general. He served as the military commandant of Moscow between 1941 and 1953.

== Biography ==
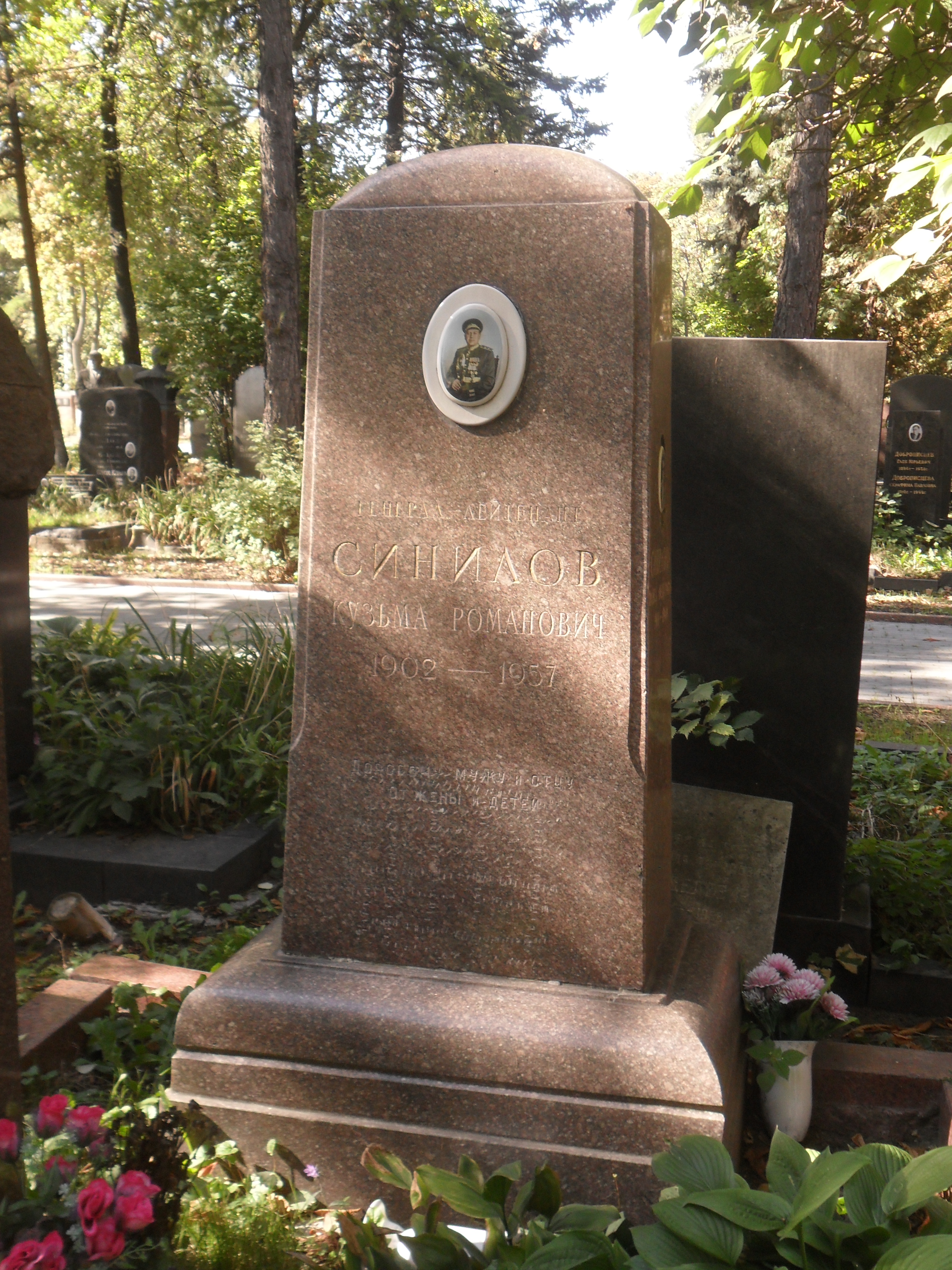
Sinilov's grave in Moscow.

Sinilov was born in the village of Byvalki in Minsk Governorate (now Loyew District, Gomel Region, Belarus) to a Russian peasant family. He first joined the Red Army in 1919, commanding a platoon. He graduated from the 2nd Moscow Infantry Courses, the 1st Joint Soviet School, and the Frunze Military Academy. He served in the cavalry in Transbaikalia. He transferred to the State Political Directorate in 1932, and in the second half of the 1930s, he commanded a number of border groups in the Far East. In this position, he also served during the Winter War. During the Murmansk Oblast elections of 1939, he was elected Deputy of the Murmansk Regional Council of People's Deputies. He commanded the Murmansk Division Border Service of the NKVD until July 1941, and then formed the 2nd Separate Division of the Special Purpose Troops of the NKVD. From 1941 to 1953. he served as the military commandant of Moscow, in which he organized and supervised the preparation of the Moscow Victory Parade of 1945. After transferring to the reserve from 1953 was in charge of military departments of forestry in Krasnoyarsk, Ryazan and the Moscow agricultural economic and statistical institutes. Sinolov died in Moscow and was buried in the Novodevichy Cemetery.

== Date of rank ==
- Kombrig
- Major General (4 June 1940)
- Lieutenant General (2 November 1944)

== Awards ==
- Order of Lenin
- 4 Orders of the Red Banner
- 2 Orders of the Patriotic War, I degree
- Order of the Red Star
- Badge "Honored Worker of the NKVD"
- Personalized Mauser Pistol)
- Order of the White Lion, 1st degree (Czechoslovakia)
- Czechoslovak War Cross 1939–1945
