= Aleksandr Nikolayevich Denisov =

Soviet and Russian military officer (1955–2020)

- Native name: Александр Николаевич Денисов
- Born: 7 March 1955
- Died: 15 March 2020 (aged 65) Moscow, Russia
- Buried: Federal Military Memorial Cemetery
- Allegiance: Soviet Union; Russia
- Branch: Soviet Army; Russian Army
- Service years: –2010
- Rank: Lieutenant general
- Commands: 4th Guards "Kantemirovskaya" Tank Division

Aleksandr Nikolayevich Denisov (Russian: Александр Николаевич Денисов; 7 March 1955 – 15 March 2020) was a Soviet and later Russian military officer who held a number of posts in both the Soviet and Russian armies, reaching the rank of Lieutenant general.

== Career ==
Denisov was born on 7 March 1955, and entered the Soviet Armed Forces. He graduated from the Moscow Higher Military Command School and rose through the ranks, serving as commander of a platoon, then company, battalion, regiment, and brigade. His postings took him to the Carpathian, Far Eastern and Moscow military districts, as well as an overseas posting to the Group of Soviet Forces in Germany. He was a graduate of the M. V. Frunze Military Academy and the Military Academy of the General Staff of the Armed Forces of Russia, and commanded the 4th Guards "Kantemirovskaya" Tank Division between 1995 and 1998. In 1998 he became military commandant of Moscow, a post he held until his retirement in 2010 with the rank of Lieutenant general.

In retirement Denisov was active in DOSAAF, a non-governmental society aimed at supporting the military. Denisov was head of the organization's Moscow branch between 2010 and 2011. Denisov died on 15 March 2020 at the age of 65, after "a serious and prolonged illness". Both the regional and national administrations of DOSAAF expressed their condolences. He was buried in the Federal Military Memorial Cemetery on 17 March.
