= Loyew district =

District of Gomel region, Belarus

Coordinates: 51°56′00″N 30°48′04″E

Loyew district Лоеўскі раён (Belarusian) Лоевский район (Russian)
- District
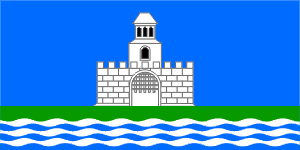
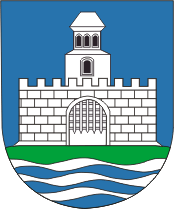
- Flag Coat of arms

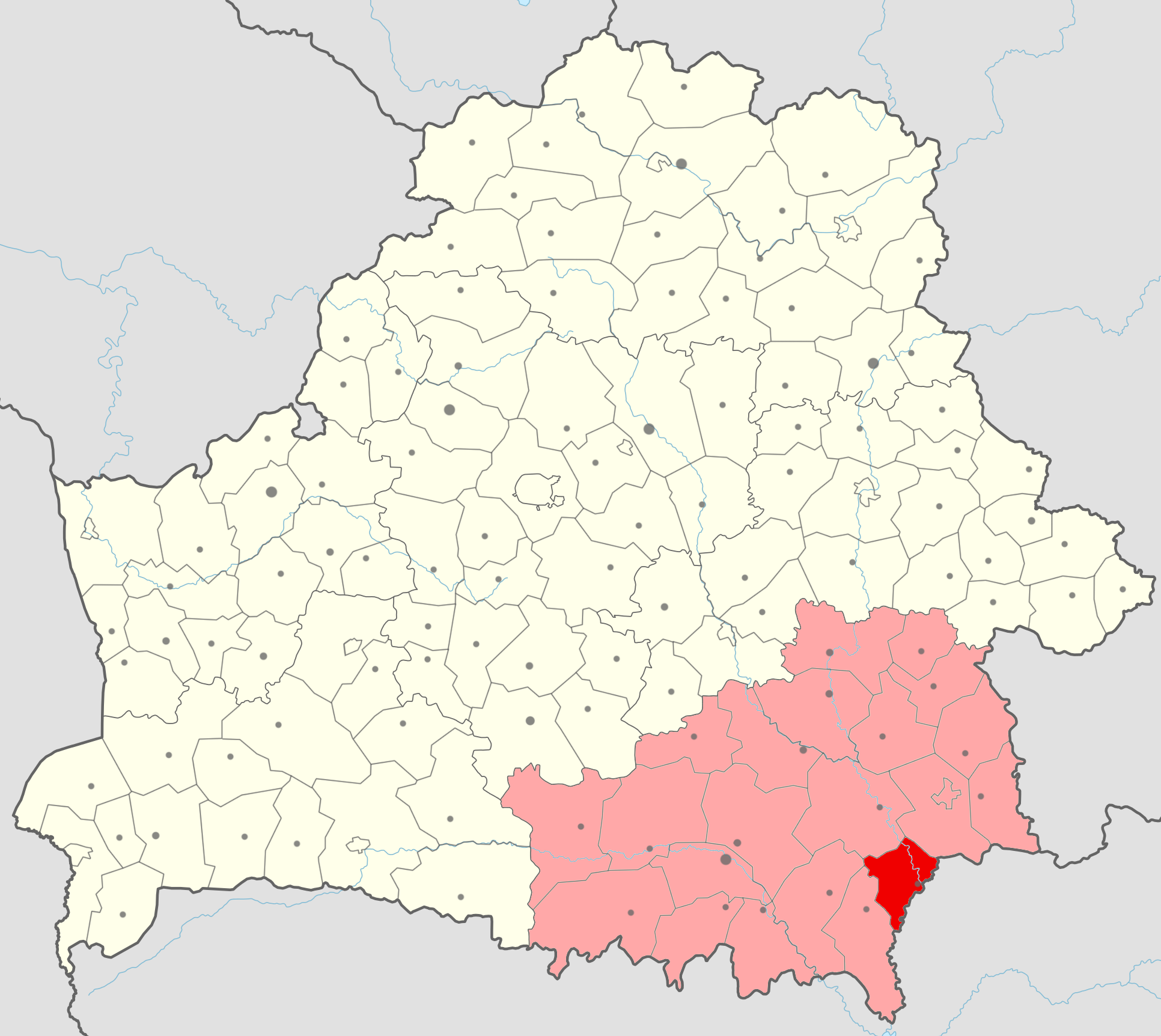
- Country: Belarus
- Region: Gomel region
- Administrative center: Loyew

Government
  - Chairman: Baikova Veronika Anatolyevna

Area
  - District: 1,045.53 km^{2} (403.68 sq mi)

Population (2024)
  - District: 10,786
  - Density: 10.316/km^{2} (26.719/sq mi)
  - Urban: 6,075
  - Rural: 4,711

Ethnicity
  - Belarusians: 92.92%
  - Russians: 4.39%
  - Ukrainians: 1.84%
  - Other: 0.85%

Spoken languages
  - Belarusian: 64.4%
  - Russian: 32.5%
  - Other: 3.1%
- Time zone: UTC+3 (MSK)
- Towns: 1
- Rural councils: 7
- Settlements: 71
- Website: Official website

Loyew district or Lojeŭ district (Belarusian: Лоеўскі раён, romanized: Lojeŭski rajon; Russian: Лоевский район, romanized: Loyevsky rayon) is a district (raion) of Gomel region in Belarus. Its administrative center is Loyew. As of 2024, it has a population of 10,786.

== History ==
The Battle of Loyew took place in 1649 where a numerically superior force of Ukrainian Cossacks under the command of Cossack warleaders Stepan Pobodailo and Mykhailo Krychevsky was defeated by the Polish–Lithuanian Commonwealth forces under the command of hetman Janusz Radziwiłł.

The district was founded on 8 December 1926. It has been a part of the Gomel region since 1938, after administrative reforms introduced regions in Byelorussian Soviet Socialist Republic (BSSR). The district was dissolved for several years in the 1960s, being abolished in December 1962 and reinstated in July 1966. It has been a district of Belarus since its independence from the USSR in 1991.

== Geography ==
The area of the district is 1,046 square kilometres (404 sq mi). Forest makes up 37.7% of the district's land use, with 43.4% used for agricultural purposes as of 2010. It is bordered in the west and north by Brahin, Khoiniki, Rechytsa, and Gomel districts of the same region, and in the east - along the Dnieper and partly along its tributary of the Sozh - with the Chernigov oblast of Ukraine. The largest body of water is the Dnieper-Brahin Reservoir. It contains the Dnieper-Sozh nature preserve.

== Demographics ==
The population of the district was 12,024 as of 2017, with 6,739 living in Loyew and 5,285 living in rural settlements. The population density of the district is 12 square kilometres (4.6 sq mi). The ethnic composition in the 2009 census was 92.9% Belarusian, 4.4% Russian, and 1.8% Ukrainian. The mother tongue of 87% of the population was Belarusian and for 11.6% Russian. Belarusian is spoken at home by 64.4% of the population and Russian by 32.5% of the population. The district's population has been in decline since the 1960s.

Historical population
Year	Pop.	±%
1959	27,377	—
1970	24,615	−10.1%
1979	22,503	−8.6%
1989	20,402	−9.3%
1999	18,013	−11.7%
2009	14,346	−20.4%
2017	12,024	−16.2%
2023	11,005	−8.5%
2024	10,786	−2.0%

== Administrative divisions ==
The district encompasses one urban settlement and seven rural councils, which contain a total of 71 settlements.

English name	Belarusian Name	Russian name	Type	Villages	Population 2009
Loyew	Ло́еў	Лоев	urban settlement		7,022
Byváĺkaŭski	Быва́лькаўскі	Бывальковский	rural council	12	949
Kárpaŭski	Ка́рпаўскі	Карповский	rural council	6	589
Kaŭpiénski	Каўпе́нскі	Колпенский	rural council	6	1,375
Malínaŭski	Малі́наўскі	Малиновский	rural council	11	936
Ručajoŭski	Ручаёўскі	Ручаёвский	rural council	9	669
Strádubski	Стра́дубскі	Страдубский	rural council	18	2,032
Ubórkaŭski	Убо́ркаўскі	Уборковский	rural council	9	774
