= Religious Hospitallers of St. Joseph =

French Catholic religious congregation

The Religious Hospitallers of Saint Joseph (RHSJ; French: Religieuses Hospitalières de Saint-Joseph, pronounced [ʁəliʒjøz ɔspitaljɛʁ də sɛ̃ ʒozɛf]) are a Catholic religious congregation founded in 1636 at La Flèche, France, by the Venerable Jérôme le Royer de la Dauversière and the Venerable Marie de la Ferre.

== History ==
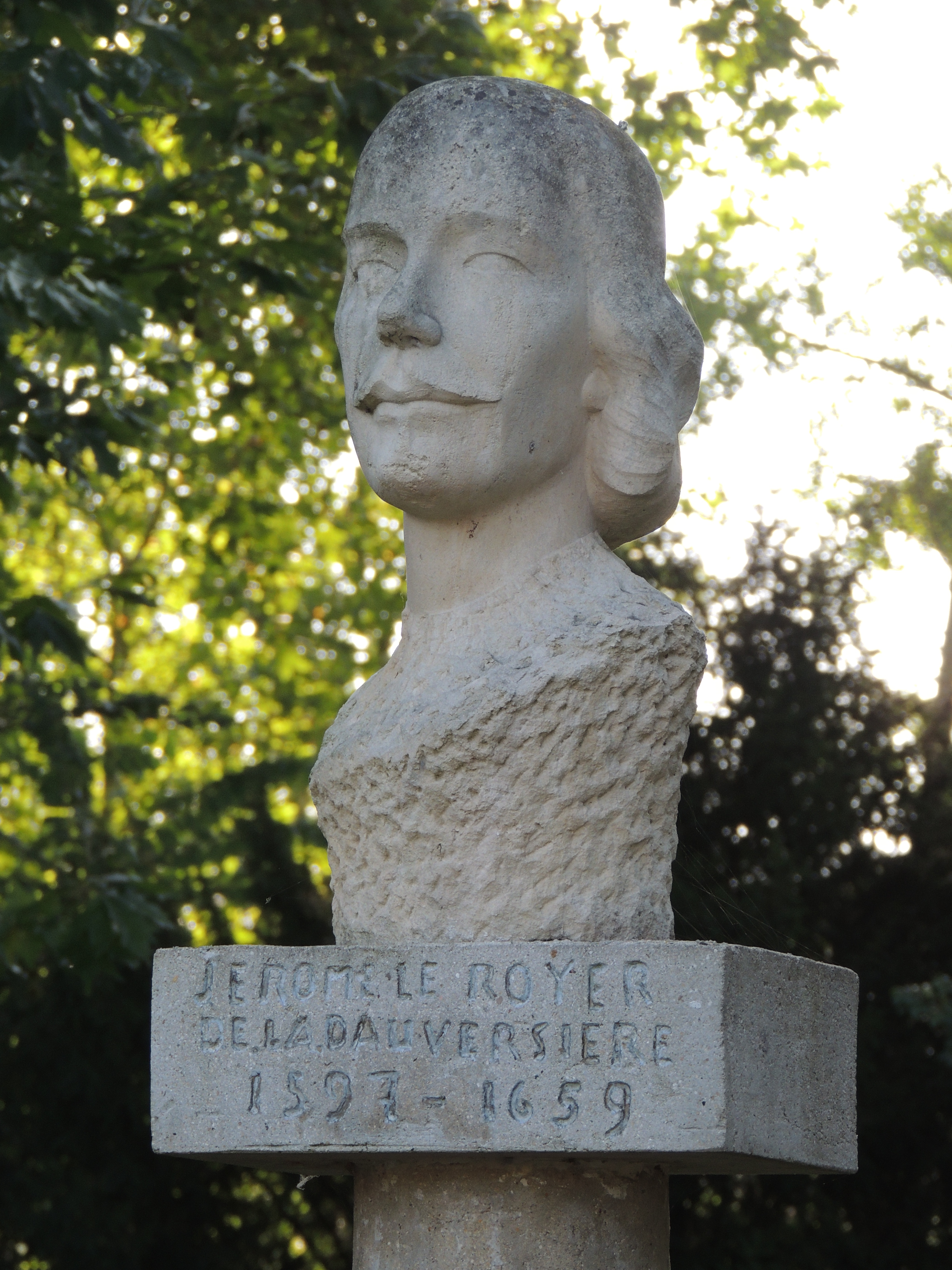
Bust of Le Royer

=== Jérôme le Royer de la Dauversière ===
Jérôme le Royer was born in La Flèche, France, on March 18, 1597. He pursued his studies at the Jesuit College there, and when his father died in 1619, Jérôme succeeded him as tax collector. He also inherited the small estate “La Dauversière”, whence comes the title attached to his name. He married Jeanne de Bauge, who bore him five children.

Le Royer collaborated in the administration of the old Maison Dieu (House of God), where the sick poor received care. The three women who worked there lived on alms obtained in the city. Le Royer wondered what to do to improve their situation. First, he rebuilt the dilapidated hospital at La Flèche.

=== Marie de la Ferre ===
Marie de la Ferre was born around 1589 in the small village of Roiffé. Around 1601, her mother died. When her father remarried, the girl went to live with her aunt, Catherine de Goubitz, at her manor in Ruigné, near La Flèche. Her aunt wanted her to make a brilliant match; but Marie decided to consecrate her life to the Lord. Several experiences of religious life having failed, Marie devoted herself to her aunt’s service, as well as those wounded by life. The people, witnesses of her charity, called her “The Holy Woman”. After the death of her aunt, De la Ferre visited the sick poor in the small Maison Dieu in La Flèche, where she met M. le Royer.

== Congregation of the Daughters Hospitallers of St. Joseph ==
Le Royer founded the Religious Hospitallers of St. Joseph (RHSJ) with Marie de la Ferre in 1636. The RHSJ are distinct from the Sisters of Saint Joseph founded in 1650 at Le Puy-en-Velay, France.

In May 1636, Marie de la Ferre and Anne Foureau formed a community at the Hotel-Dieu with three servants of the poor already on site. Thus began the Congregation of the Daughters Hospitallers of St. Joseph. The first constitutions of the congregation were approved and on January 22, 1644, Marie de la Ferre and her eleven companions made simple vows for one year in the Congregation of the Daughters of St. Joseph. They elected De la Ferre as superior of the newly founded community. In the spring of 1652, an epidemic broke out in the town of Moulins, where the Sisters had come to serve the sick. The infection claimed many people and even the Sisters fell ill. As the epidemic began to regress, Sister Marie de la Ferre, already exhausted, died on July 28, 1652.

The RHSJ continued to expand to new sites, including in North America in both Canada and the United States. They founded hospitals at Kingston, Ontario in 1845; Athabaskaville, near Quebec City, in 1881; Campbellton, New Brunswick, in 1889; and in Burlington, Vermont in the United States in 1894. In 1897 the RHSJ founded a Hotel Dieu at Cornwall, Ontario. They constructed facilities, including a school, nurses training school, and nursing facility. In the twentieth century, the order reorganized to integrate its people from Canada, the United States and France. The generalate is located in Canada, its chief area of activity.

== Canada ==
=== Ville-Marie ===
Le Royer founded centers at Ville-Marie, now Montreal, for education and a hospital, where care would be given by sisters of the new order. He sponsored Paul de Chomedey and Jeanne Mance, a lay woman, to go to Ville-Marie with French colonists to evangelize the Natives and establish a hospital (Hôtel-Dieu de Montréal) to care for the poor. Mance founded it in Montréal in 1642.

In 1659, three Sisters from Laval, Judith Moreau de Brésoles, Catherine Mace and Marie Maillet were chosen for the first community of Hospitallers of St. Joseph in Montreal in New France to work at the hospital. That year the RHSJ received letters patent from King Louis XIV to take over the hospital and its operations. Each convent was autonomous and responsible solely to the local bishop. Marie Morin, who took her vows with the order in 1671, was the first Canadian-born nun. The hospital was separately incorporated in 1967.

=== Expansion ===
Since its establishment in Canada, the RHSJ has set up a number of hospitals, schools and other facilities during the period of increased immigration and growth beginning in the mid-nineteenth century. In September 1845, the RHSJ order established the Hotel Dieu Hospital (Kingston, Ontario). That facility was in operation when Kingston suffered an epidemic of typhus in 1847. In addition to ill and dying patients, Hotel Dieu cared for 100 orphaned children who had lost their parents. The disease had accompanied poor Irish immigrants fleeing famine in their homeland. No one yet understood how the disease spread, and poor sanitation practices compounded the epidemic.

The congregation spread to other towns, and other houses opened orphanages and boarding schools. In 1819, a community of Hospitallers Canonesses of Saint Augustin in Ernée merged with the Hospitallers of St. Joseph. In the nineteenth century, the RHSJ also established an Hotel Dieu and convent school in New Brunswick at each of three towns: Tracadie (1868), Chatham (1869), and Saint-Basile (1873). The sisters helped establish medical and nursing care in these communities, as well as schools for the education of children.

Responding to recent immigration from the United States, the RHSJ established the Hôtel-Dieu Hospital in 1888 at Windsor, Ontario. Dean T. Wagner, pastor of St. Alphonsus Church in Windsor, invited the RHSJ to the city. He was particularly concerned that black immigrants from the United States' South were not being adequately served by other community institutions. For instance, black children were denied entry to white schools. At that time, they were fleeing oppressive conditions in the South, where whites had regained control of state legislatures and in many areas used intimidation and force to keep blacks away from the polls. The blacks who moved to Canada can be considered precursors of the Great Migration out of the South in the first half of the 20th century, by which some six million blacks moved to the North, Midwest, and West Coast cities. The RHSJ founded a hospital for Windsor, and a school for black children.

== Present day ==
In 1953, the American and Canadian communities became one congregation; the French congregations then joined in 1965. The Motherhouse is located in Montreal. In 2017, the Hospitallers sold the monastery at the Hôtel-Dieu to the City of Montreal and subsequently relocated. In the United States, the sisters are active in Winooski, Vermont; Chicago, Illinois; Antigo, Wisconsin; and Palos Park, Illinois.

== See also ==
- Fanny Allen
- Amanda Viger
- Société Notre-Dame de Montréal
