= Amanda Viger =

Canadian nun

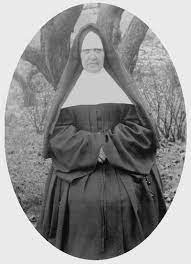
- Born: July 27, 1845; Boucherville, Bas-Canada
- Died: May 8, 1906 (aged 60); Arthabaska, Victoriaville, Québec
- Other name: Saint-Jean-de-Goto

Amanda Viger was a Canadian nun known for her work in helping people with leprosy (Hansen's disease).

== Early life ==
Amanda Viger, known as Saint-Jean-de-Goto, is a religious hospitaller of Saint Joseph, pharmacist, founder and general director of the Hôtel-Dieu of Tracadie. She was born on July 27, 1845 in Boucherville, Quebec to her parents Bonaventure Viger and Eudoxie Trudel.

== Career ==
She completed her secondary studies at the Congregation of Notre-Dame in Boucherville’s boarding school, where she trained as a pharmacist and hospital administrator. And on September 8, 1860, at only 15 years old, she entered the novitiate of the Religious Hospitallers of Saint Joseph of Montreal, where she took her religious vows on February 2, 1863. The Hospitaller Sisters of Saint Joseph ran the Hôtel-Dieu de Montréal, where Amanda Viger trained in pharmacy and healthcare administration.

In 1868, at 23 years old, she moved to Tracadie, New Brunswick with five other sisters, to help people suffering from leprosy. She focus on establishing a pharmacy to provide medicines for people in need. She ultimately remained at the facility for 34 years. In 1875, she was elected as superior of her community, and she was elected mother superior seven more times. She worked closely with doctors Alfred Corbett Smith and Joseph-Charles Taché to treat leprosy patients and provide information about the disease. She also established a school in 1873 where she and other nuns helped to educate children until 1885. From 1888 the children were lodged near the lazaretto, and Viger helped raise funds for a new school that was completed in 1898. Thanks to her involvement, a stone leprosarium was built by the federal government, welcoming leprosy patients from April 8, 1896.

In 1899, Sister Saint-Jean-de-Goto completed her fifth term as superior. She had also served as novice mistress for 16 years and as pharmacist for 28 years.

Tensions arose when Bishop Rogers of Chatham opposed the Sisters of Charity of Tracadie, particularly Sister Amanda Viger, because of their French-language school, while he wanted to establish an English-language school in Chatham. This conflict, exacerbated by disagreements with Father Gauvreau, ultimately led to Sister Viger's departure from Tracadie to the Hôtel-Dieu d'Arthabaska In August 1902, she was called to Arthabaska, in the province of Quebec, to once again serve as superior at the Hôtel-Dieu of Arthabaskaville. Then, in 1902, she was elected superior. She had a larger building constructed and helped with the financial issues facing the institution and, in 1903, while already suffering from cancer, she undertook the construction of a new five-story wing to meet the needs of the community.

Viger died from cancer on 8 May 1906, at the age of 61 years old.

== Foundation ==
Amanda Viger helped found the Hôtel-Dieu de Tracadie (New Brunswick), Canada's first hospital for lepers, which was completed in 1898. Under her leadership, the leprosarium became a veritable hospital-convent, named Hôtel-Dieu de Tracadie, which took in both lepers and other poor patients.

She also established a school in New Brunswick where, along with other nuns, she provided education for children until 1885.
