= Military Commandant of Moscow =

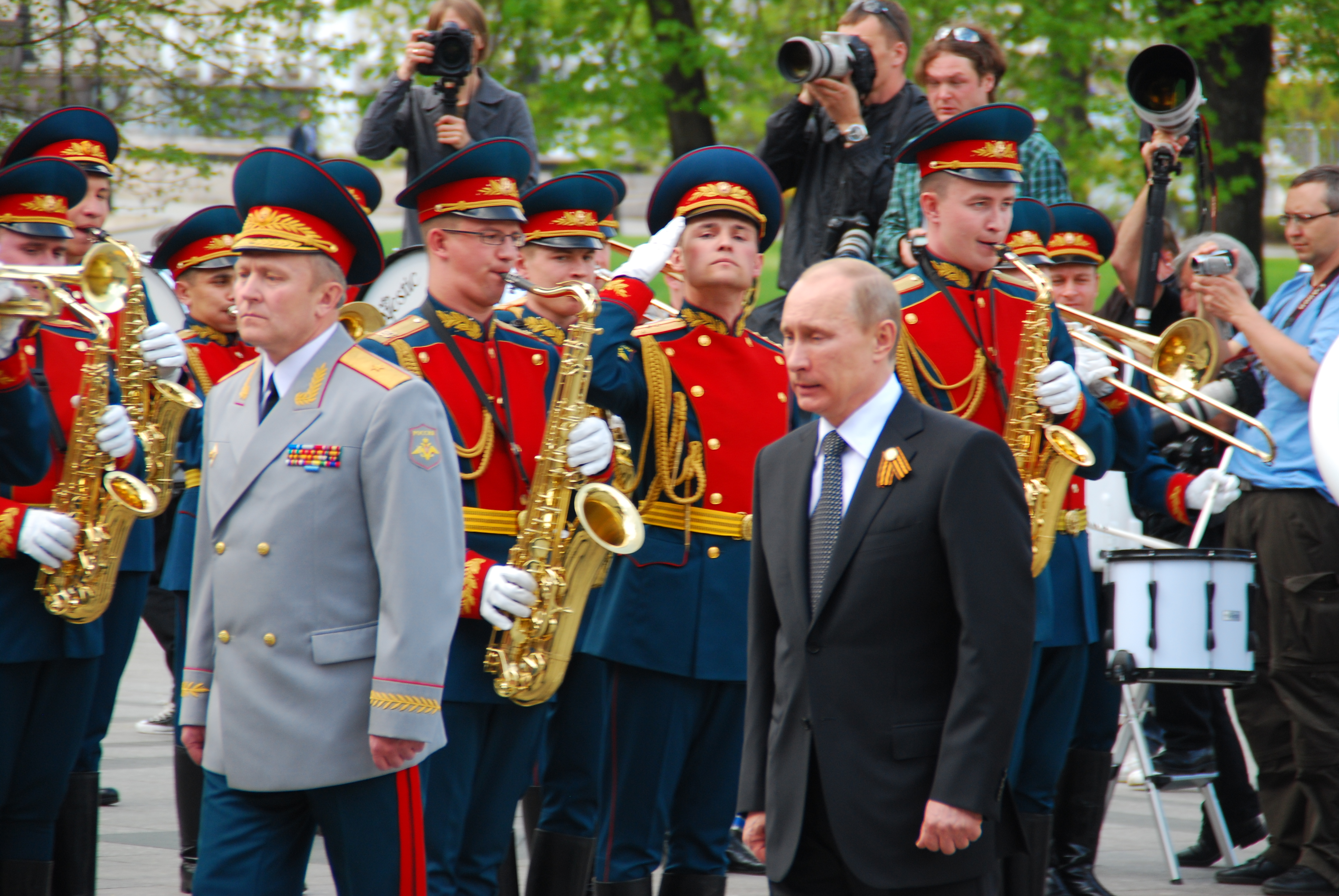
Yevgeny Seleznev (left) and Vladimir Putin at Alexandrov Garden in 2012.

The Military Commandant of Moscow (Russian: военный комендант Москвы) is an administration unit of the Military Police under the Ministry of Defence in the Russian capital of Moscow. The current Commandant of Moscow is Lieutenant General Yevgeny Seleznev. The Office of the Commandant supervises all work regarding to military activities in the federal capital city, and is the lead organizer of all national ceremonial activities within the capital's vicinity and its metropolitan region involving the Armed Forces as a whole.

== History ==
=== Pre-history ===
The first official mention in historical documents of the position of the military commandant of the city of Moscow dates back to the beginning of the 18th century. In 1707. Prince Matvey Gagarin was appointed as the first military commandant of the city of Moscow. For the first time, the responsibilities of the commandant were officially defined in 1716, in a document signed by Tsar Peter the Great entitled: “The charter of the military post of generals-field marshals and all generals and other officials who should be with the army, and about other military affairs and behaviors that everyone should fix ". With the formation of the Ministry of War of the Russian Empire in 1802, the functions of city commandants were limited exclusively to specific duties. Following the Patriotic War of 1812, the Charter "On Service in the Garrison", introduced by Tsar Alexander I in 1816, reduced some of the powers of military commandants, freeing them of the need to personally delve into all the issues of city life.

=== Foundation and early history ===
On 23 July 1918, the Moscow Commandant Directorate was formed. Since the late 1940s. it has been deployed in house #16 on Novaya Basmannaya Street. During World War II, the Office of the Commandant was entrusted with enormous responsibility for organizing law and order on the territory of Moscow and suburban areas, being directly involved in the defense of the city, The commandant was subordinate to the Narodnoe Opolcheniye of Moscow, as well as the 2nd Separate Special Division of the NKVD.

=== Post-war and events of August 1991 ===
In the post-war period, not a single major event in the capital would take place without the participation of the office. The organization of military honors at the state funerals of party leaders and prominent statesmen, the preparation of military parades of troops on Red Square, and other solemn events, were among its duties. It also responsible for the provision of state visits by heads of foreign states and many high-ranking foreign political figures. In 1979, the Office of the Commandant of the City of Moscow received a new official name: the Military Commandant's Office of the City of Moscow. In 1988, the Presidium of the Supreme Soviet of the RSFSR awarded the Military Commandant's Office with a certificate of honor "For services in maintaining the statutory order and organization on the territory of the Moscow garrison". Many officers of the commandant's office in the 1980s distinguished themselves by serving during the Soviet–Afghan War as well as in the Ukrainian SSR following the Chernobyl disaster. During the August coup in 1991, the personnel of the Military Commandant's office were responsible for restoring order to the city. General Nikolai Kalinin (the commander of the Moscow Military District), was appointed by coup leader Gennady Yanayev as military commandant of Moscow, declaring a curfew in Moscow from 23:00 to 5:00, effective from 20 August. General Smirnov, the de jure military commandant of Moscow, took part, together with members of the Supreme Soviet of the RSFSR, in the negotiations of the commanders of the 2nd Taman Division, which was loyal to the State Committee on the State of Emergency.

=== Under the Russian flag ===
In November 1994, President Boris Yeltsin delivered his gratitude for the office's "great contribution to the preparation and conduct of the official visit to Russia of Queen Elizabeth II of Great Britain". In 2011, the Military Commandant's Office was removed from the order of battle of the Russian Ground Forces and became part of the military police of the Ministry of Defense. Until 2024, personnel of the commandant's office served on active military duty in Syria as part of Russia's involvement in the Syrian Civil War.

== Activities ==
=== Policing ===
In terms of policing, it ensures law and order and military discipline on the territory of the Moscow Territorial Garrison, carrying out measures for servicemen evading military service, and counteracting illegal drug trafficking.

=== Parades ===
The commandant is the chief organizer of the annual Moscow Victory Day Parade on 9 May. The first of these parades was the parade of the Red Army on 25 May 1919. It was timed to coincide with the first anniversary of general military training. The military commandant also organized and supervised the preparation of the 1941 October Revolution Parade and the Moscow Victory Parade of 1945.

=== Ceremonies ===
In its duties, it often works with the 154th Preobrazhensky Independent Commandant's Regiment, which is the official honor guard regiment of the Russian Armed Forces. Among the military funerals it organizes at Novodevichy Cemetery are those of high ranking generals. It also does the same for national leaders, having first organized the state funeral of Joseph Stalin in March 1953. Events at the Tomb of the Unknown Soldier take place with the organization of the commandant. In 2018, in honor of the centenary of the military commandant's office, the 1967 lighting of the Tomb of the Unknown Soldier was recreated in the Alexander Garden of Moscow.

== List of Commandants of Moscow ==
The following have served as military commandants:

- Oskar Berzin (1917—1918)
- Robert Bodnek (1918—1919)
- Vladimir Yershov-Kovalsky (1919)
- Sergey Ganshin (1919—1921)
- Nikolay Yakovlev (1921—1926)
- Pyotr Tkalun (1926—1929 and 1931—1935)
- Nikolay Klykov (1930)
- Pyotr Tkalun (1931—1935)
- Mikhail Lukin (1935—1937)
- Filip Suvorov (1937—1939)
- Vasily Revyakin (1939—1941)
- Dmitry Gutishev (1941)
- Kuzma Sinilov (1941—1953)
- Ivan Kolesnikov (1953—1970)
- Pyotr Astakhov (1970—1972)
- Vladimir Serykh (1973—1988)
- Nikolai Smirnov (1988—1999)
- Alexander Denisov (1999—2010)
- Yevgeny Seleznev (since 19 July 2010)

== Council of Veterans ==
The Council of Veterans the true mentors of the personnel in preserving and enhancing traditions. The veteran's organization was founded by Lieutenant General Vladimir Serykh. It has been led since 2004 by Colonel Sergey Khmelidze. In addition to constant communication with the personnel, a veterans act as historians of the commandant's office. They are responsible for maintaining the Museum of the Military Commandant's Office. The museum was created by the Russian Military Historical Society by order of Minister of Culture Vladimir Medinsky, and opened on 21 February 2019, as part of the celebrations of the anniversary of the Russian Army.

== See also ==
- Commandant's Office of the Moscow Kremlin
- Military District of Washington
- London District (British Army)
- Military governor of Paris
- Warsaw Garrison Command
- Planalto Military Command
- AFP Joint Task Force – National Capital Region
- Pyongyang Defense Command
- Central Theater Command
- Kodam Jayakarta
