= Loyew =

Urban-type settlement in Gomel Region, Belarus

Loyew Лоеў (Belarusian) Лоев (Russian)
- Urban-type settlement
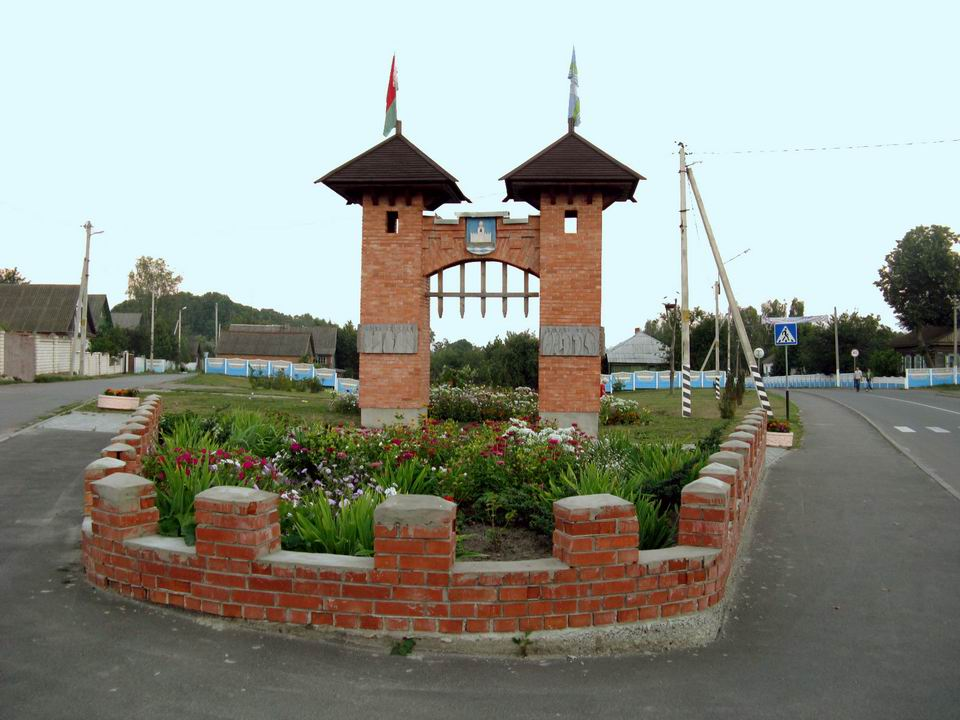

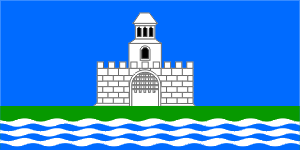
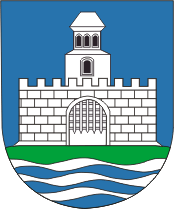
- Flag Coat of arms

- Location within Belarus
- Coordinates: 51°56′00″N 30°48′04″E
- Country: Belarus
- Region: Gomel Region
- District: Loyew District
- First mentioned: 1505

Area
  - Total: 6.768433 km^{2} (2.613307 sq mi)
- Elevation: 132 m (433 ft)

Population (2025)
  - Total: 6,028
  - Density: 890.6/km^{2} (2,307/sq mi)
- Time zone: UTC+3 (MSK)
- Postal code: 247095
- Area code: +375 2347
- License plate: 3
- Website: loev.gomel-region.by

Loyew or Loyev (Belarusian: Лоеў, romanized: Lojeŭ, IPA: [ˈlojew]; Russian: Лоев, IPA: [ˈloɪf]; Polish: Łojów) is an urban-type settlement in Gomel Region, in south-eastern Belarus. It serves as the administrative center of Loyew District. In 2018, its population was 6,698. As of 2025, it has a population of 6,028.

The settlement is located along the right coast of the Dnieper River at the confluence with the Sozh.

== History ==
Loyew arose on the site of an ancient settlement of the Dregoviches within the Principality of Chernigov. The settlement was situated on the route from the Varangians to the Greeks. The first mention of Loyew goes back to 1505 and it was known as Loyewa Hara (Loyew Hill).

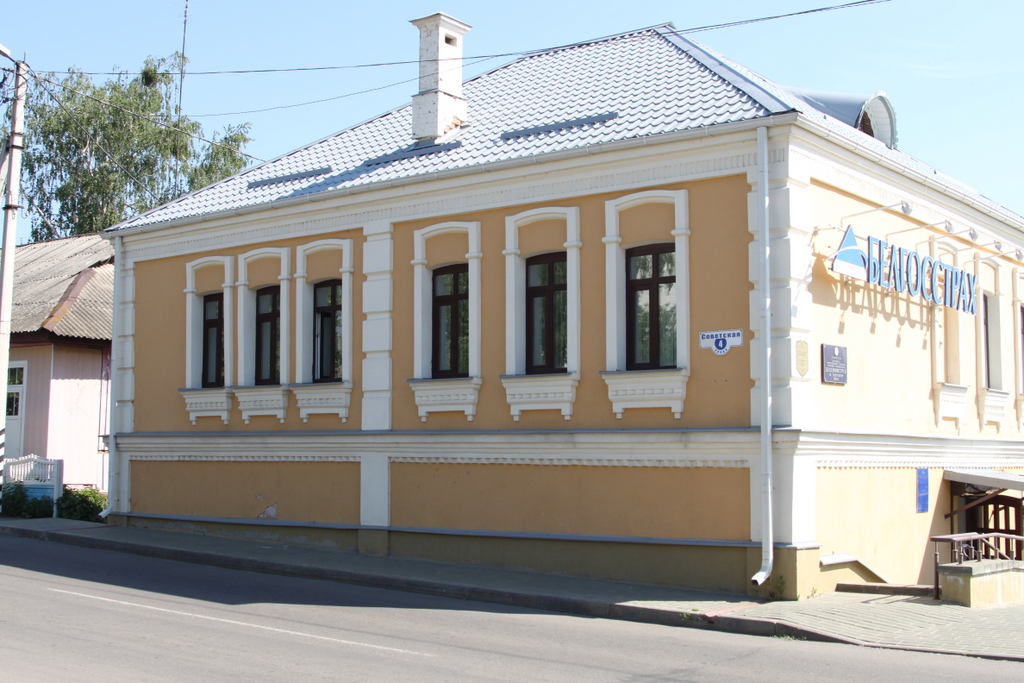
Former merchant house, 19th century

In 1569, it passed to the Kingdom of Poland within the Polish–Lithuanian Commonwealth. In 1646, it passed to Lithuania within the Commonwealth, as reward for the loss of Trubeck. During the Khmelnytsky Uprising, it was the location of two battles, fought in 1649 and 1651, both won by Polish–Lithuanian forces. After the Second Partition of Poland in 1793, it became a part of the Russian Empire. According to the results of the census held in 1897 the town had 4,667 inhabitants, among them 2150 Jews. There were 251 farms, 9 mills, 24 shops, 1 school, 1 post-office, 2 orthodox churches, 1 catholic church and 1 synagogue.

In December 1926, Loyew was included in the Byelorussian SSR and became the center of Loyew District. In 1938, it was granted the status of a city. In 1941–1943, the city lost nearly 1,500 inhabitants. In 1962-1966 it was placed in Rechytsa District.

In the city there are building materials and dairy factories, a pedagogical school and musical school, a house of culture, and some libraries. There is the Church of the Holy Trinity in Loyew.
