= Marie Morin =

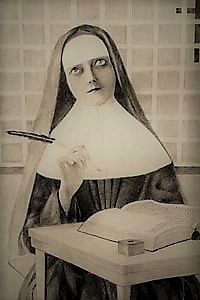
Marie Morin 1649-1730

Marie Morin (March 19, 1649 – April 8, 1730) was a nun and historian in New France. She was the first Canadian-born woman to become a nun.

The daughter of Noël Morin, seigneur of Saint-Luc, and Hélène Desportes, she was born in Quebec City and was educated at the Ursuline convent there. Her brother Germain was the first Canadian-born priest. At the age of 11, she decided that she wished to join the Religious Hospitallers of Ville-Marie in Montreal. Her parents disagreed, preferring a community closer to their home but, two years later, she became a novice of the Hospitallers. She took her vows in 1671. Because of her business sense, she was named depositary (financial director) several times. In 1693, she became the first Canadian-born superior of the Hôtel-Dieu de Montréal, serving until 1698; she served again as superior from 1708 to 1711. She also directed renovation work for an expansion of the Hôtel-Dieu in 1689 and directed its reconstruction after a fire in 1695.

From 1697 to 1725, she wrote the annals chronicling the history of the Hôtel-Dieu. She died in Montreal after suffering a long illness.

== See also ==
- Catholic Church in Canada
