= John Holwell =

John Holwell (24 November 1649 – 1686?) was an English astrologer and mathematician.

== Biography ==
He was probably the John Holwell, son of Thomas and Catherine Holwell, who was baptised at St. James's, Clerkenwell, on 28 Nov, 1649. According to a biography, he was descended from the Holwells of Holwell House, near Tavistock, Devon, and his father and grandfather were engaged in Penruddock's plot in 1655, fell in the royalist cause, and as a consequence forfeited the family estates. It is known that a John Holwell of Sampford was actually sequestered in 1655, but in 1652 a Captain John Holwell, probably the same person, appears as giving information against the papists to the officers of the Commonwealth, and there is no proof of his connection with Penruddock's plot. The same account states that after the Restoration, Holwell was made royal astronomer and surveyor of the crown lands, while his wife obtained a place at court, which is possible, and that he was preceptor to the Duke of Monmouth, which his age makes unlikely.

He is further alleged to have written anonymously in support of the Exclusion Bill, and to have given such offence by his ‘Catastrophe Mundi’ that he was brought before the privy council, but to have defended himself so skilfully that no charge could be established against him.

He usually described himself on the title-pages of his book as ‘philomath,’ and once as ‘teacher of the mathematicks and astrology’. In his advertisements (e.g. Catastrophe Mundi, p. 40) he announces that ‘Arts and Sciences are mathematically professed and taught by the author … at his house on the east side of Spittle Fields, over against Dorset Street … He also measureth building and surveyeth land for any later.for any man, having the mos experience in surveying of any man in England.’ His writings show that he was a firm Protestant.

The biography already referred to gives an unauthenticated story that in 1685 the government, fearing his pen, sent him to America to survey the town of New York, giving orders that he was not to be allowed to return. After completing, his work he died suddenly, it was suspected of poison.

Holwell left a widow, by whom he had a son and a daughter. His son Zephaniah (d. 1729) was a timber merchant in London, father of John Zephaniah Holwell.

== Works ==
- A sure Guide to the Practical Svyveyor, in two parts. The first showing how to Plot all manners of Grounds … as also how to Find the Area thereof … The second … how to take the Ground Plot of any City or Corporation; as also the Mensuration of Roads … with the manner of making a Map of any County or Kingdom, London, 1678, 8vo, illustrated by diagrams, and with an ‘Appendix of Mathematical Tables.’
- A New Prophecy … of the Blazing Star that appeared April the 23rd. Being a full Account of the Events and Sad Effects thereof, London, 1679, 4to, pp. 4; written, according to the title, two years before, ‘as will be attested by several persons on oath.’
- Catastrophe Mundi: or Evrope’s many Mutations until the year 1701 … Whereunto is annexed, The Hieroglyphicks of Nostradamus … Rightly placed, and in order … with the addition of many more, London, 1682, 4to, pp. 40; with astrological tables and many illustrations; the preface is dated 12 Oct. 1682.
- An Appendix to … Catastrophe Mundi, being an Astrological Discourse of the Rise … of the Othoman Family. With the Nativities of the present French King, Emperors of Germany and Turky … Whereunto is added a Supplement of the Judgment of Comets, London, 1683, 4to, pp. 40. The preface is dated 9 May 1683. These two works which foretold the speedy fall of the pope, called forth from a rival astrologer, John Merrifield, ‘Catastasis Mundi: Proving that the Turks will be defeated notwithstanding Mr. Holwel’s menaces to the contrary … Also the said Holwel’s monstrous falsehoods and errours discovered, &c.,’ London, 1684.
- Trigonometry made Easy, London, 1685, 8vo.
- Clavis Horologiæ, or a Key to the whole Art of Arithmetical Dyalling, London, 1686, 4to.

To this there was added as an appendix a reprint of Guillaume Streel’s ‘Explication of the pyramidical dyal set up in his Majesty’s Garden at Whitehall, anno 1669’. In an advertisement in the ‘Catastrophe’ (p. 40), Holwell says that he has ready for the press a ‘Clavis Horologie,’ and also a ‘Table of the Altitude of the Sun for any Hour of the Day,’ which is probably a part of the same work.

- Strange and wonderful Prophecies. Foretelling what shall happen … in the years 1697, 1698, 1699, and 1700, London, 1696, 8vo; a reprint from the ‘Catastrophe.’
