= Battle of Loyew (1651) =

1651 battle

- Part of the Khmelnytsky Uprising
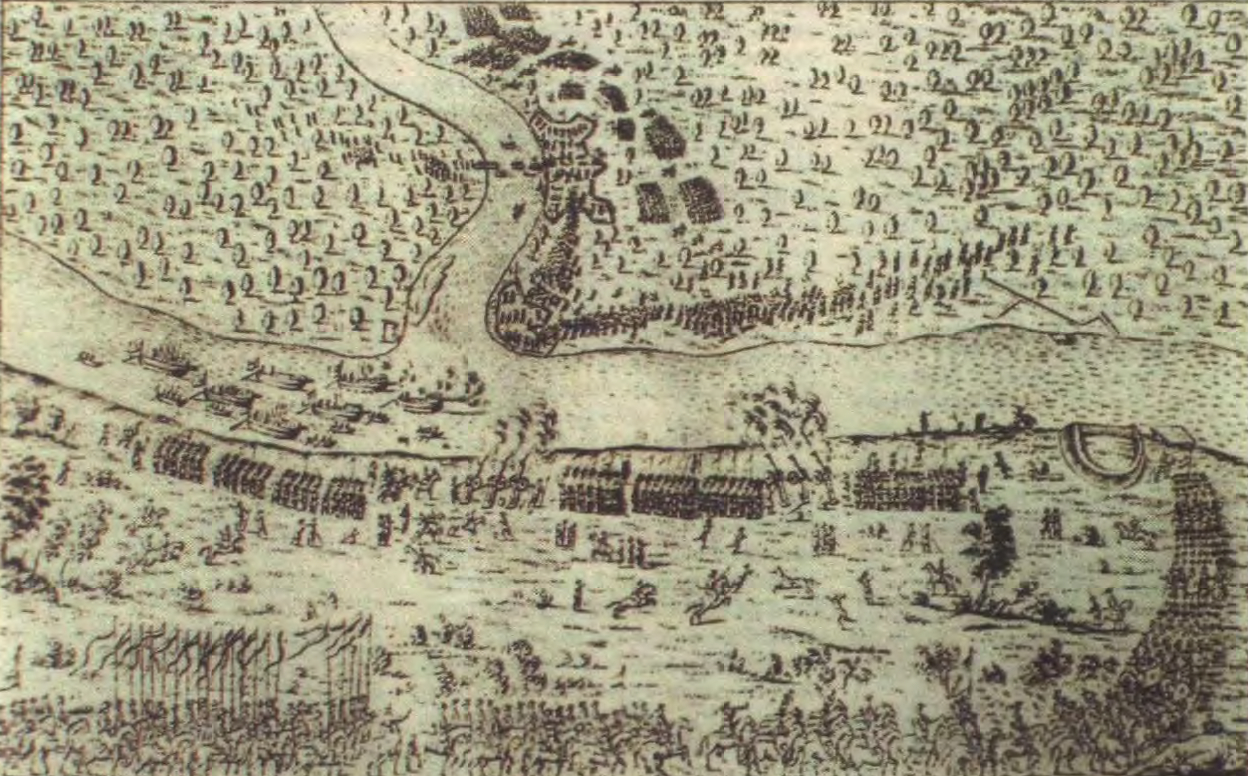
- The Battle of Loyew (1651) on the Polish–Lithuanian painting by Abraham van Westerveld in the XVII century
Date	6 July 1651
Location	Loyew, Sozh River, Minsk Voivodeship, Polish–Lithuanian Commonwealth
Result	Polish–Lithuanian victory

Belligerents
Polish–Lithuanian Commonwealth	Cossack Hetmanate

Commanders and leaders
Janusz Radziwiłł	Martyn Nebaba; Stepan Pobodailo; Prokip Shumeyko; Lytvynenko

Strength
4,000	15,000–20,000

Casualties and losses
200 killed and wounded	5,000 killed and wounded

The Battle of Loyew (Belarusian: Бітва пад Лоевам, Ukrainian: Битва під Лоєвом, Polish: Bitwa pod Łojowem; 6 July 1651) was fought between the Polish–Lithuanian Commonwealth against the Cossack Hetmanate as a part of the Khmelnytsky Uprising. Near the site of the present-day town of Loyew on the Sozh River in Belarus, the Polish–Lithuanian Commonwealth’s forces under the command of Prince Janusz Radziwiłł and Mirski attacked and defeated a forces of the Zaporozhian Cossacks under the command of Colonels Martyn Nebaba, Stepan Pobodailo and Prokip Shumeyko with Lytvynenko.

Just a few weeks after the Battle of Berestechko, Bohdan Khmelnytsky managed to gather the scattered Cossacks and, supported by the Tatars, once again posed a serious threat. Meanwhile, on the Polish side, the levy, like King John Casimir, refused to continue fighting and returned home. Mercenary units moved into the depths of Ukraine. On September 3, the Crown Hetmans ( Potocki and Kalinowski ) occupied Lubar. Janusz Radziwiłł headed the Lithuanian troops (11 Lithuanian cavalry banners, including 2 Tatar banners of Sienkiewicz and Murza, a total of 4,000 soldiers) to meet the Crown troops, defeating on July 6 the Cossack covering units of Colonel Martyn Nebaba (15,000 mainly infantry) marching towards Gomel near Łojów on the Dnieper. The victorious Lithuanian Field Hetman, after liberating a three-thousand-strong Cossack cavalry unit besieged in Krzyczew, captured Kiev on August 4.
