= Stepan Pobodailo =

Stepan Pobodailo or Podobailo (Old Ukrainian: Стефан Пободайло/Подобайло, Ukrainian: Степан Пободайло; died 1654) was a Ukrainian Cossack leader.

In 1646 he began the reconstruction of the Trinity–Saint Elijah's Monastery in Chernihiv.

He was in the service of Adam Kisiel until 1648, then went to Bohdan Khmelnytsky and was active in the Khmelnytsky Uprising. In 1649, he was defeated at the Battle of Loyew while trying to aid Mykhailo Krychevsky. He took part in negotiations with Moscow in Pereiaslav in 1654. On July 1654, he was killed during the Siege of Gomel. However, according to other sources, he died during the assault on the Old Bykhov fortress . The Cossacks transported the colonel's body to Chernigov. According to his will, Pobodailo was buried next to the Church of St. Elijah in the Trinity-St. Elijah Monastery in Chernigov , which was rebuilt in 1649 with his funds.
