= Battle of Loyew (1649) =

1649 battle

- Part of the Khmelnytsky Uprising
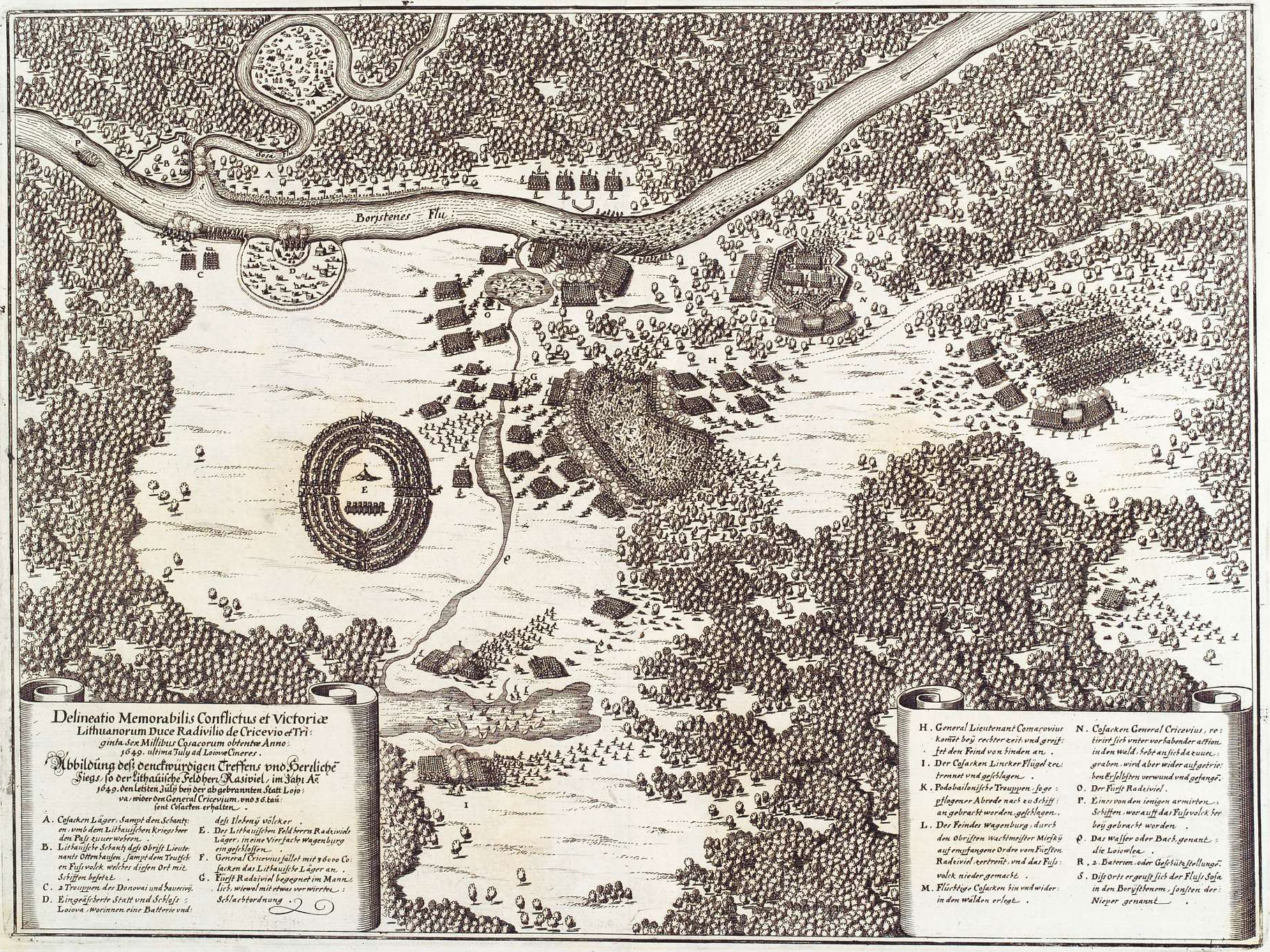
- The Battle of Loyew (1649) on the German engraving Theatrum Europaeum by Cristoph von Eygerd in 1663
Date	31 July 1649
Location	Loyew, Sozh River, Minsk Voivodeship, Polish–Lithuanian Commonwealth
Result	Polish–Lithuanian victory

Belligerents
Zaporozhian Host	Polish–Lithuanian Commonwealth

Commanders and leaders
Mykhailo Krychevsky †; Stepan Pobodailo; Martyn Nebaba	Janusz Radziwiłł; Wincenty Korwin Gosiewski

Strength
17,000	6,000–10,000

Casualties and losses
3,000 killed and wounded	200–300 killed and wounded

The Battle of Loyew (Belarusian: Бітва пад Лоевам, Ukrainian: Битва під Лоєвом, Polish: Bitwa pod Łojowem; 31 July 1649) was fought between the Zaporozhian Host against the Polish–Lithuanian Commonwealth as a part of the Khmelnytsky Uprising. Near the site of the present-day town of Loyew on the Sozh River in Belarus, a forces of the Zaporozhian under the command of Colonels Mykhailo Krychevsky, Stepan Pobodailo and Martyn Nebaba was defeated by the Polish–Lithuanian Commonwealth's forces under the command of Prince Janusz Radziwiłł and Nobleman Wincenty Korwin Gosiewski. Prince Janusz Radziwiłł was able to engage a forces of the Zaporozhian Cossacks before they merged. First, he defeated the army of the Zaporozhian Cossacks under the command of Colonel Mykhailo Krychevsky, who was killed in the battle; then he defeated the rest armies of the Zaporozhian Cossacks under the command of the other Colonels Stepan Pobodailo and Martyn Nebaba.

== Background ==
The Zaporozhian Cossacks under the command of Colonel Stepan Pobodailo with a forces numbered around 7,000 men captured the town of Loyew in the summer of 1649 and began using it as an operational base in the region, from which they staged a series of pillaging attacks and raids on the Polish–Lithuanian Commonwealth's forces. Prince Janusz Radziwiłł took the Polish–Lithuanian forces numbered about 10,000 men, including around 800 winged hussars, 1,000 infantry and the rest is lighter cavalry and artillery in the field to challenge him.

Hetman Bohdan Khmelnytsky, leader of the Zaporozhian Cossacks, learned about Prince Janusz Radziwiłł's plans while besieging Zbarazh in 10 July — 22 August, 1649. He sent part of his Zaporozhian Cossack's forces, an army numbered around 10,000 men under the command of Colonel Mykhailo Krychevsky to support an army numbered around 7,000 men under the command of Colonels Stepan Pobodailo and Martyn Nebaba against the Polish–Lithuanian Commonwealth.

On 23 July 1649, the Crown Army approached the town of Loyew on the Right-Bank of the Dnipro River. Colonels Stepan Pobodailo and Martyn Nebaba fortified camp was on the left and Prince Janusz Radziwiłł decided to start a siege by shelling the Zaporozhian Cossack's camp with his artillery over the river.

== Battle ==
When Prince Janusz Radziwiłł learned of the approaching of the Zaporozhian Cossack's reinforcements under the command of Colonel Mykhailo Krychevsky, he sent 2,000 men of the Zaporozhian Cossack's cavalry to scout and destroy the enemy, but Colonel Mykhailo Krychevsky avoided them and attacked the main Polish–Lithuanian Commonwealth's forces. The Zaporozhian Cossack's assault was however broken by the Crown Army infantry and artillery fire. Then Prince Janusz Radziwiłł assaulted the Zaporozhian Cossacks with his Polish–Lithuanian cavalry, but it was encircled by the Zaporozhian Cossacks and would have been destroyed if the rest of the Polish–Lithuanian Commonwealth's cavalry, returning from the failed scouting mission, hadn't arrived at that moment and turned the tables.

The remains of the Zaporozhian Cossacks under the command of Colonel Mykhailo Krychevsky took up positions in a wagon fort. Initial attempts by the Polish–Lithuanian Commonwealth's forces to take the new Zaporozhian Cossack's positions failed. In the meantime, a forces of the Zaporozhian Cossacks under the command of Colonel Stepan Pobodailo crossed the Sozh River to help their allies, but were defeated by the Crown Army. After that, the Polish–Lithuanian Commonwealth's forces final assault on the wagon fort succeeded, with the winged hussars dismounting and taking to battle on foot. Mykhailo Krychevsky, mortally wounded, was taken prisoner and then was killed by the Poles and Lithuanians. Janusz Radziwiłł collected about 40 Zaporozhian Cossack's banners from the field. Samuel Orgelbrand saying about the Zaporozhian Cossack's casualties and losses numbered around 3,000 men, 17 artillery pieces and 12 banners.

One of the reasons for the defeat of the Zaporozhian Cossacks and the significant casualties and losses was a strategic mistake of Mykhailo Krychevsky, who misjudged the factor of suddenness which allowed the Polish–Lithuanian Commonwealth's forces to destroy each unit of the forces of the Zaporozhian Cossacks separately.

== Aftermath ==
The Polish–Lithuanian Commonwealth's forces retook control of the Minsk Voivodeship, but lack of supplies prevented Prince Janusz Radziwiłł from advancing on Kyiv against the Zaporozhian Cossacks.

Prince Janusz Radziwiłł was rewarded by the Polish King John II Casimir with possessions at Nevel, Sebezh and Krasne. Not content with those rewards, he would later betray the Polish–Lithuanian Commonwealth in the Union of Kédainia on 20 October 1655.

Another the Battle of Loyew on 6 July 1651 would take place in the same area but two years later between the Polish–Lithuanian Commonwealth and Cossack Hetmanate.
