= Mykhailo Krychevsky =

Polish noble, military officer, and Cossack commander

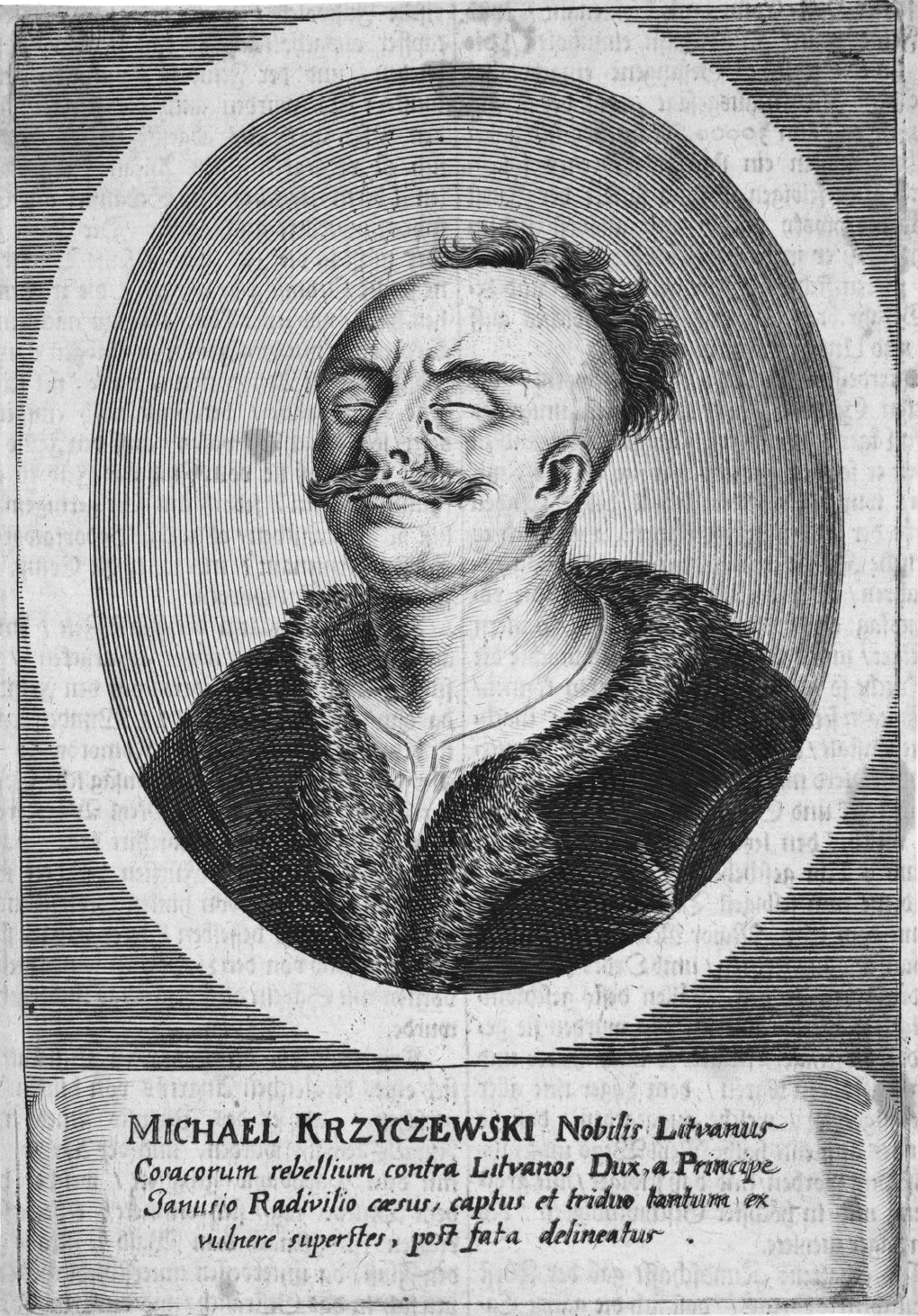
Mykhailo Krychevsky

Mykhailo Krychevsky or Stanisław Krzyczewski or Krzeczowski (died 3 August 1649) was a Polish noble, military officer and Cossack commander. He fought for the Polish–Lithuanian Commonwealth against various Cossack revolts and Crimean Tatar factions. During his time as a Cossack commander, Krychevsky befriended Bohdan Khmelnytsky, who would go on to stage a revolt against the Polish-Lithuanian throne.

After being captured by enemy forces in 1648, Krychevsky was ransomed to Khmelnytsky and was named an acting hetman of Khmelnytsky's rebel forces. Krychevsky was mortally wounded in the battle of Loyew on 31 July 1649 and died in the custody of Polish forces.

== Biography ==
Coat of Arms of Stanisław Michał Krzeczowski

He was born Stanisław Krzeczowski or Krzyczewski (sources vary) to a Roman Catholic family of nobility (szlachta), polonized around the turn of the 16th and 17th centuries in the Brest Litovsk Voivodeship. His year of birth is unknown, but in mid-1640s he likely served in the Commonwealth army for 10 to 20 years. Hence it can be conjectured that he was close to 30 years old if not older at this time. Thus he was likely born no later than mid-1610s, and possibly earlier.

Little is known about his early life. Ukrainian historian Vyacheslav Lypynsky, in his 1912 biography of Krychevsky, speculated that with the rank of rotmistrz he fought in the Polish-Swedish wars (1627–1629) under hetman Stanisław Koniecpolski, where he led a chorągiew (unit) of Polish hussars. However more recent Polish studies dispute this, noting that the rotmistrz, known in some sources only by his surname Krzeczowski and in others as Mikołaj Krzyczewski, was probably another person.

It is much more likely that Krychevsky was present in the sejm of 1632 which elected Władysław IV Waza the king of Poland. He also probably helped quell the Cossack Pavlyuk Uprising in 1637, fighting in a Cossack chorągiew loyal to the King, under prince Zachariasz Czetwertyński and was wounded in that campaign. In 1643 Hetman Koniecpolski, who considered him a valuable commander, gave him the rank of polkovnyk (colonel) and made him the leader of a registered Cossacks unit (pułk) based in Chyhyryn. He replaced the previous commander of that unit, Jan Zakrzewski, who was removed after fraud or mistreatment of those under his command. As a polkovnyk Krychevsky was known for his favorable attitude towards the Cossacks.

In 1644 he was given the task of gathering information on the Tatar invasion; it is possible that he fought in the battle of Okhmativ under Hetman Koniecpolski against Tatars of Tugay Bey. In 1646 and in 1647 he took part in another series of hostilities with the Tatars.

Eventually Krychevsky became a friend and a sympathizer of Bohdan Khmelnytsky and even became a godfather to Khmelnytsky's child. He met Khmelnytsky while both were serving in the Chyryryn Cossack unit. In 1647 he helped Khmelnytsky, who had been arrested and sentenced to death under a suspicion of preparing another Cossack uprising. After receiving guarantees of Khmelnytsky's innocence (from Krychevsky and others), Koniecpolski allowed Khmelnytsky to go free. Khmelnytsky's promptly went to Zaporizhian Sich where he started the Khmelnytsky Uprising. Nonetheless Krychevsky did not join the uprising and remained in command of his unit and was known as a supporter of official Commonwealth policies. Krychevsky himself informed Koniecpolski of Khmelnytsky's escape, and then started gathering information about the situation in Zaphoroze. He took part in scouting missions, captured Cossack prisoners, and participated in negotiations early that year. During this time he was assaulted and battered by the Cossacks.

According to an account given in Polski Słownik Biograficzny, in April, while securing a fortification in Bucki, a Cossack unit under his command rebelled and he was taken prisoner. Unlike some of his fellow officers, however, he was not killed but instead given to the Tatars. He was ransomed from them by Khmelnytsky (for 4,000 talars), and joined his side becoming a respected commander.

A different account of how Krychevsky joined Khmelnytsky is present in other sources. Taken prisoner by Tatars during the Battle of Zhovti Vody (Yellow Waters) in April/May 1648, where he still fought on the Polish-Lithuanian side against the Cossacks, he was liberated by Khmelnytsky, who convinced him to join his side. Other sources even accuse Krychevsky of joining Khmelnytsky in the midst of the battle, and of meeting (or planning to meet) with him before the battle.

In either case, all accounts agree that Krychevsky converted to Orthodoxy from Roman Catholicism, adopting a new name, Mykahilo (Michael).

He was given the title of acting Hetman and was considered a very able and promising commander by Khmelnytsky. Very likely he acted as a close adviser to the rebel leader. He was defeated and mortally wounded in the battle of Loyew on 31 July 1649. Field Hetman of Lithuania Janusz Radziwiłł wanted to save his life, so he could be put on trial for joining the uprising, but his wounds were too great and he died soon afterwards, on 3 August 1649.

== In fiction ==
Krychevsky was a minor character in Henryk Sienkiewicz's novel With Fire and Sword (Ogniem i Mieczem).
