= List of battles of the Khmelnytsky Uprising =

The Khmelnytsky Uprising was a Cossack rebellion that took place from 1648 to August 1657 in the Polish–Lithuanian Commonwealth. For 1654–1657, see also the List of battles of the Polish–Russian War (1654–1667). More broadly, see also the List of battles involving the Zaporizhian Cossacks.

== 1648–1653 ==
Date Old Style (Note: In the 17th century, the difference between Old Style and New Style dates was 10 days, with the Gregorian calendar (New Style) being 10 days ahead of the Julian calendar (Old Style). The Polish–Lithuanian Commonwealth officially adopted the Gregorian calendar in 1582, and the civil and secular authorities adopted it, but this was resisted by Orthodox churches as well as predominantly Orthodox Cossack communities in Ukraine and Belarus, who kept using the Julian calendar (until March 1918 in the Ukrainian People's Republic and Belarusian People's Republic). In Russia, where the Byzantine Anno Mundi calendar was still common, the Julian calendar was not adopted until 1700, and then retained until February 1918 in Bolshevik Russia. Sweden did not adopt the Gregorian calendar until 1753. The resulting date differences in primary sources and later literature could sometimes cause confusion. (The Crimean Khanate and Ottoman Empire continued using the Hijri calendar throughout the war, although the Ottomans adopted a Julian-derived fiscal calendar in 1677).) (Julian calendar)	Date New Style (Gregorian calendar)	Battle	Front (Note: Voivodeship or Regiment, sometimes with campaign.)	Cossack Hetmanate forces (Note: This belligerent included all the regiments (polky) of the rebel Registered Cossacks (later renamed Town Cossacks), and all the rebel palankas (palanky) of the Zaporizhian Host of the Zaporizhian Cossacks (Sich Cossacks), plus all the intermittent allies of the Cossack Hetmanate. Equivalent adjectives describing this belligerent may be "Ukrainian", "Ruthenian", "Zaporizhian", "Khmelnytsky", or (historically) "Cherkasy".)	Commonwealth forces (Note: This belligerent included the military of the Polish–Lithuanian Commonwealth, and is often referred to as "Polish", "Polish–Lithuanian", "Commonwealth", "Republican" or "Royal" (depending on the political emphasis), or with pars pro toto references to the szlachta, "gentry" or "nobility", or simply "Warsaw".)	Result
	29 April – 16 May 1648	Battle of Zhovti Vody (Yellow Waters)	Kyiv; 1648	Zaporizhian Host; Crimean Khanate	Commonwealth forces	Cossack-led victory
15–16 May 1648	25–26 May 1648	Battle of Korsuń	Kyiv; 1648	Zaporizhian Host; Crimean Khanate	Commonwealth forces	Cossack-led victory
May – October 1648	May – October 1648	Siege of Kodak (1648) Kodak Fortress	Kyiv; 1648	Zaporizhian Host; Crimean Khanate	Commonwealth forces	Cossack-led victory
6–8 July 1648 O.S.?		Battle of Makhnivka	Bratslav; 1648	Zaporizhian Host	Commonwealth forces	Cossack victory
16–18 July 1648	26–28 July 1648	Battle of Kostiantyniv	Podolia; 1648	Zaporizhian Host	Commonwealth forces	Disputed
1648	1648	Siege of Przemyśl	Przemyśl	Zaporizhian Host	Commonwealth forces	Commonwealth victory
1648	1648	Siege of Stary Bykhaw	Stary Bykhaw	Zaporizhian Host	Commonwealth forces	Commonwealth victory
1648	1648	Siege of Kremenets	Kremenets Castle	Zaporizhian Host	Commonwealth forces	Cossack victory
25–31 July 1648	4–10 August 1648	Siege of Bar	Bratslav; 1648	Zaporizhian Host	Commonwealth forces	Cossack victory
August–September 1648	August–September 1648	Siege of Slutsk (1648)	Navahrudak; 1648	Zaporizhian Host	Commonwealth forces	Commonwealth victory
4 September 1648	14 September 1648	Battle of Pohost	Brest Litovsk; 1648	Zaporizhian Host	Commonwealth forces	Commonwealth victory
11–13 September 1648	21–23 September 1648	Battle of Pyliavtsi	Podolia; 1648	Zaporizhian Host	Commonwealth forces	Cossack-led victory
26 September – 16 October 1648	October – November 1648	Siege of Lviv (1648)	Ruthenia; 1648	Zaporizhian Host; Crimean Khanate	Commonwealth forces	Indecisive (Note: Siege lifted after the Commonwealth paid a heavy ransom to the Cossacks.)
8–15 October 1648		Siege of Lviv High Castle Lviv High Castle	Ruthenia; 1648	Zaporizhian Host; Crimean Khanate	Commonwealth forces	Cossack–led victory
	October – November 1648	Siege of Zamość (1648) Zamość Fortress	Ruthenia; 1648	Zaporizhian Host; Crimean Khanate	Commonwealth forces	Indecisive; Truce of Zamość (Note: Cossack withdrawal following the Truce of Zamość.)
26 October – 10 November 1648?		Pinsk Uprising	Brest Litovsk; 1648	Pinsk rebels Zaporizhian Host	Commonwealth forces: Lithuanian Army	Commonwealth victory Town sacked
23 November – December 1648?		Siege of Drohobych	Ruthenia; 1648	Zaporizhian Host local rebels	Commonwealth forces	Cossack-led victory
8–9 February 1649?		Battle of Mazyr	Minsk	Zaporizhian Host	Commonwealth forces	Commonwealth victory
February 1649		Siege of Bar (1649)	Bratslav	Zaporizhian Host	Commonwealth forces	Commonwealth victory
1649	January – 21 February 1649	Siege of Babruysk	Babruysk	Zaporizhian Host	Commonwealth forces	Commonwealth victory
May 1649		Battle of Zaslav (1649) Iziaslav, Ukraine	Volhynia	Zaporizhian Host	Commonwealth forces	Commonwealth victory
17–18 June 1649	27–28 June 1649	Battle of Zahal	Minsk	Zaporizhian Host; Crimean Khanate	Commonwealth forces	Commonwealth victory
30 June – 12 August 1649	10 July – 22 August 1649	Siege of Zbarazh	Volhynia	Zaporizhian Host; Crimean Khanate	Commonwealth forces	Commonwealth victory
31 July 1649	10 August 1649	Battle of Loyew (1649)	Minsk	Zaporizhian Host	Commonwealth forces	Commonwealth victory
5–6 August 1649	15–16 August 1649	Battle of Zboriv (1649)	Ruthenia	Zaporizhian Host; Crimean Khanate	Commonwealth forces	Indecisive; Treaty of Zboriv
Autumn 1649		Battle of Rzeczyca	Minsk	Cossack Hetmanate	Commonwealth forces	Commonwealth victory
	August – 17 September 1650?	Moldavian campaign of Bohdan Khmelnytsky (1650)	Moldavia	Cossack Hetmanate; Crimean Khanate	Moldavia	Cossack-led victory
10–13 February 1651	20–23 February 1651	Battle of Krasne	Bratslav	Cossack Hetmanate	Commonwealth forces	Commonwealth victory
19 February – 6 March 1651	1–16 March 1651	Defence of Stina	Bratslav	Cossack Hetmanate	Commonwealth forces	Cossack victory
1–10 March 1651	11–20 March 1651	Siege of Vinnytsia	Bratslav	Cossack Hetmanate	Commonwealth forces	Cossack victory
19 March 1651?		Battle of Lypovets (1651)	Bratslav	Cossack Hetmanate	Commonwealth forces	Cossack victory
12 May 1651?		Battle of Kopychyntsi	Ruthenia	Cossack Hetmanate; Crimean Khanate	Commonwealth forces	Commonwealth victory
4–14 June 1651	14–24 June 1651	Kostka-Napierski uprising (Note: Loosely connected to Khmelnytsky Uprising. Bohdan Khmelnytsky had sent agitators throughout the Commonwealth, and the Podhale rebels sympathised with the Cossacks, but are probably best understood as co-belligerents rather than allies of the Cossacks.)	Kraków	Cossack Hetmanate	Commonwealth forces	Commonwealth victory
18–30 June 1651	28 June – 10 July 1651	Battle of Berestechko	Volhynia	Cossack Hetmanate	Commonwealth forces	Commonwealth victory
6 July 1651?		Battle of Loyew (1651)	Minsk	Cossack Hetmanate	Commonwealth forces	Commonwealth victory
Summer 1651 (Note: after Berestechko.)		Battle of Blue Waters (1651)	Uman	Cossack Hetmanate	Crimean Khanate	Cossack victory
13 August 1651?		Battle of Taborivka	Bila Tserkva	Cossack Hetmanate	Commonwealth forces	Cossack victory
25 July 1651	4 August 1651	Capture of Kyiv (1651)	Kyiv	Cossack Hetmanate	Commonwealth forces	Commonwealth victory
23–25 September 1651?		Battle of Bila Tserkva (1651)	Bila Tserkva	Cossack Hetmanate	Commonwealth forces	Indecisive; Treaty of Bila Tserkva
22–23 May 1652	1–2 June 1652	Battle of Batih	Bratslav	Cossack Hetmanate; Crimean Khanate	Commonwealth forces	Cossack-led victory Batih massacre
1652	1652	Siege of Kamianets-Podilskyi	Kamianets-Podilskyi	Cossack Hetmanate	Commonwealth forces	Commonwealth victory
July–September 1652?	1652	Wedding campaign of Tymofiy Khmelnytsky	Moldavia	Cossack Hetmanate	Moldavia	Cossack-led victory
20–21 March 1653?	March 1653	Battle of Monastyryshche	Bratslav	Cossack Hetmanate	Commonwealth forces	Cossack victory
1 May 1653?		Battle of Iași (1653) (Battle of Popricani)	Moldavia; Tymofiy	Cossack Hetmanate; Crimean Khanate	Moldavia; Wallachia	Cossack-led victory
(early May 1653?)	mid-May 1653?	Battle of Tecuci	Moldavia; Tymofiy	Cossack Hetmanate; Moldavia	Wallachia	Cossack-led victory
12 May 1653?	22 May 1653?	Battle of Focșani (1653)	Moldavia; Tymofiy	Cossack Hetmanate; Moldavia	Wallachia	Cossack-led victory
16 May 1653?	26 May 1653?	Battle of the Teleajen	Moldavia; Tymofiy	Cossack Hetmanate; Moldavia	Wallachia	Cossack-led victory
17 May 1653	27 May 1653	Battle of Finta	Moldavia; Tymofiy	Cossack Hetmanate; Moldavia; Crimean Khanate mercenaries	Wallachia; Commonwealth forces mercenaries	Wallachia-led victory
16 July 1653?	July 1653	Battle of Sirka	Moldavia; Tymofiy	Cossack Hetmanate; Moldavia	Wallachia; Moldavia; Transylvania	Wallachia-led victory
22 August – 9 October 1653?		Siege of Suceava (1653)	Moldavia; Tymofiy	Cossack Hetmanate; Moldavia	Transylvania; Wallachia; Moldavia; Commonwealth forces	Cossack defeat Tymofiy KIA
September – 16 December 1653?		Siege of Zhvanets	Podolia	Cossack Hetmanate; Crimean Khanate	Commonwealth forces	Indecisive (Note: Sometimes considered a tactical Cossack-led victory. The forces of Khmelnytsky agreed to lift the siege in exchange for the renewal of the 1649 Treaty of Zboriv, which was more advantageous for the Cossack Hetmanate than the 1651 Treaty of Bila Tserkva. Nevertheless, the Commonwealth managed to conclude the Treaty of Kamianets (1653) with the Crimean Khanate, eventually leading to a Crimean–Commonwealth alliance that would last until 1666/7. The Cossacks thereby lost their most important ally, accelerating the negotiations with Muscovy for the Pereiaslav Agreement in early 1654.)

== 1654–1655 ==
Date Old Style (Julian calendar)	Date New Style (Gregorian calendar)	Battle	Front	Cossack Hetmanate forces	Commonwealth forces	Result
	2–4 April 1654	Siege of Uman	Right-Bank Ukraine	Khmelnytsky's Cossacks	Commonwealth forces Crimean Khanate	Khmelnytsky victory
	6 July – 16 September 1654	Siege of Smolensk	Smolensk	Tsardom Army; Zolotarenko's Cossacks	Commonwealth forces	Tsardom-led victory
June – 13 August 1654	June – 27 August 1654	Siege of Gomel	Belarus; Zolotarenko	Zolotarenko's Cossacks	Commonwealth forces	Zolotarenko victory
	29 August – 26 November 1654	1st Siege of Stary Bykhaw	Belarus; Zolotarenko	Zolotarenko's Cossacks	Commonwealth forces	Commonwealth victory
14 August – 22 November 1654	24 August – 2 December 1654	Siege of Vitebsk	Belarus; Zolotarenko	Tsardom Army; Zolotarenko's Cossacks	Commonwealth forces	Tsardom-led victory Inhabitants deported
	14–19 January 1655	Siege of Uman	Right-Bank Ukraine; Galician	Khmelnytsky's Cossacks	Commonwealth forces Crimean Khanate	Khmelnytsky victory
19 January – 22 January 1655	29 January – 1 February 1655	Battle of Okhmativ	Right-Bank Ukraine; Galician	Tsardom Army; Khmelnytsky's Cossacks	Commonwealth forces Crimean Khanate	Indecisive, or Commonwealth-led victory
2 February – 1 May 1655	12 February — 11 May 1655	Siege of Mogilev	Belarus; Zolotarenko	Tsardom Army; Zolotarenko's Cossacks	Commonwealth forces	Tsardom-led victory
29 July 1655	7 August 1655	Battle of Vilnius	Lithuania; Zolotarenko	Tsardom Army; Zolotarenko's Cossacks	Commonwealth forces	Tsardom-led victory Sack of Vilnius
	mid-May – 17 October 1655	2nd Siege of Stary Bykhaw	Belarus; Zolotarenko; Trubetskoy	Zolotarenko's Cossacks; Tsardom Army	Commonwealth forces	Commonwealth victory Death of Zolotarenko
	September 1655	Siege of Slutsk	Belarus; Zolotarenko	Tsardom Army; Zolotarenko's Cossacks	Commonwealth forces	Commonwealth victory
15 September – 30 October 1655	25 September – 8 November 1655	Siege of Lviv	Right-Bank Ukraine; Galician	Tsardom Army; Khmelnytsky's Cossacks	Commonwealth forces	Commonwealth victory
19 September 1655	29 September 1655	Battle of Horodok (Note: Gródek Jagielloński.)	Right-Bank Ukraine; Galician	Tsardom Army; Khmelnytsky's Cossacks	Commonwealth forces	Tsardom-led victory
15–20 October 1655		Siege of Lublin	Lesser Poland	Tsardom Army; Vyhovsky's Cossacks	Commonwealth forces	Tsardom-led victory
10–12 November 1655	20–22 November 1655	Battle of Ozerna	Right-Bank Ukraine; Galician	Tsardom Army; Khmelnytsky's Cossacks	Commonwealth forces Crimean Khanate	Indecisive; Commonwealth diplomatic victory (Note: The battle was inconclusive. However, the Tsardom troops were released for ransom, and forced to retreat. Bohdan Khmelnytsky signed a treaty obligating him to provide military assistance to the Commonwealth, and sever his relations with the Tsardom. All spoils captured by the Tsardom Army and Khmelnytsky's Cossacks were handed to the Crimean Khanate.)

== 1657 ==
Date Old Style (Julian calendar)	Date New Style (Gregorian calendar)	Battle	Front	Cossack Hetmanate forces	Commonwealth forces	Result
March – July 1657?		Transylvanian campaign into Poland (1657)	Commonwealth	Transylvania; Swedish Empire; Cossack Hetmanate; Moldavia; Wallachia	Commonwealth forces Crimean Khanate	Indecisive
7 May 1657 (Note: "Тут була залога в литовців (600 чоловік), але тільки вони побачили шведів, здалися 7 травня.")	16 May 1657?	Siege of Brest	Brest Litovsk	Swedish Empire; Cossack Hetmanate; Transylvania	Commonwealth forces	Swedish-led victory
	14–17 June 1657?	Capture of Warsaw (1657)	Masovia	Transylvania; Swedish Empire; Cossack Hetmanate; Moldavia; Wallachia	Commonwealth forces	Transylvania-led victory
11 July 1657?		Battle of Magierów	Ruthenia	Transylvania; Cossack Hetmanate; Moldavia; Wallachia	Commonwealth forces Crimean Khanate	Commonwealth-led victory
20 July 1657?		Battle of Czarny Ostrów	Ruthenia	Transylvania; Cossack Hetmanate; Moldavia; Wallachia	Commonwealth forces Crimean Khanate	Commonwealth-led victory

== See also ==
- Batih massacre
- Khmelnytsky pogroms
- List of battles involving the Zaporizhian Cossacks (1489–1775)
- List of battles of the Polish–Russian War (1654–1667), including Bohdan Khmelnytsky's last years (January 1654 – August 1657)
