= Bratslav Regiment =

Bratslav Regiment Брацлавський полк
- Coat of arms of Bratslav Regiment
- Active: 1648–1712
- Country: Cossack Hetmanate
- Type: Cossack Regiment
- Size: 22 sotnias, 2655 Cossacks (1649)
- Garrison/HQ: Bratslav, Podolia
- Engagements: Khmelnytsky Uprising; Polish–Cossack–Tatar War; Chyhyryn Campaigns

Commanders
- Notable commanders: Danylo Nechai

Bratslav Regiment Брацлавський полк (Ukrainian)
- Regiment of Cossack Hetmanate
- 1648–1712
- Coat of arms

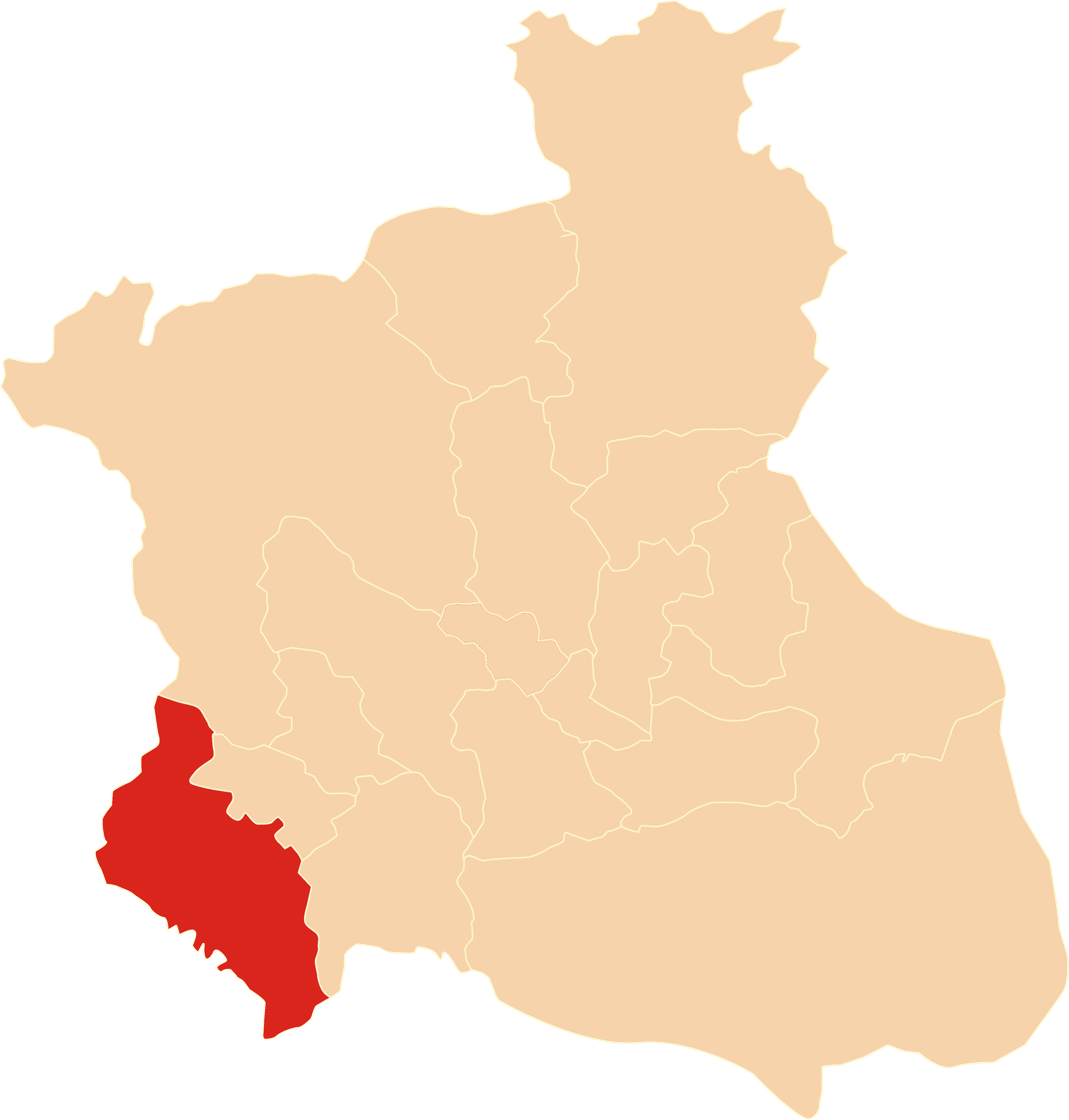
- Bratslav Regiment (red) in the Cossack Hetmanate in 1660
- Capital: Bratslav
- History
  - Khmelnytsky Uprising: 1648
  - Treaty of the Pruth: 1712
Preceded by	Succeeded by
Bratslav Voivodeship	Bratslav Voivodeship
- Today part of: Ukraine

Bratslav Regiment (Ukrainian: Брацлавський полк) was an administrative division of the Cossack Hetmanate which existed between 1648 and 1712. It was located in southern Podolia. The regiment's administrative capital was Bratslav.

== History ==
Creation of the regiment was officially recognized by the Treaty of Zboriv in 1649. In 1654 Cossacks of Bratslav Regiment refused to pledge allegiance to tsar Alexis of Russia following the Treaty of Pereyaslav. During 1674-1675 most of the regiment's population fled due to fighting between the Polish troops of Jan Sobieski and Ottoman armies allied with Right-bank hetman Petro Doroshenko.

In 1675 the regiment's Cossacks recognized Polish appointee Ostap Hohol as acting hetman. In 1685 the Sejm confirmed the rights and privileges of local Cossacks, which led to the revival of Bratslav Regiment. The regiment was liquidated following the Treaty of the Pruth, and its territory was reincorporated into the Polish-Lithuanian Commonwealth.

== Administrative divisions ==
According to the 1649 Register of the Zaporozhian Host, the regiment consisted of following sotnias:

- Raihorod (including Horodnytsia, Bortnyky, Vyshkivtsi, Machokha, Yastrubyntsi)
- Tulchyn (incl. Bilousivka, Zhuravlivka, Kryshchyntsi, Kobelivka)
- Kleban
- Krasne (incl. Ivanivtsi, Cheremushna, Rohizne, Sokolivka, Dzvonykha, Tyvriv, Klishchiv, Sokolyntsi, Yurkivtsi, Silnytsia, Turkivtsi, Bilousivka, Mykhailivka, Voroshylivka)
- Brailiv
- Vilshanka
- Verbka
- Hariachkivka (incl. Kusnochky)
- Tymanivka (incl. Illiashivka, Markivka, Savyntsi, Kytaihorod, Kornyche)
- Oleksandrivka (Zhabokrych, Kryklyvets)
- Yalanets
- Yampil
- Sharhorod
- Murafa (incl. Penkivka, Kopystyryn
- Stanislavivka (incl. Sadkivtsi)
- Miastkivka (incl. Popkivtsi, Shpykivka, Rakhny, Stina, Kachkivka)
- Luchytsia
- Bahlanivka (Berkivka, Tokarnivka, Borodavka)
- Chechelnyk (incl. Katashyn)
- Komarhorod
- Chernivtsi
