= Truce of Zamość =

1648 treaty between Poland and Zaporizhia

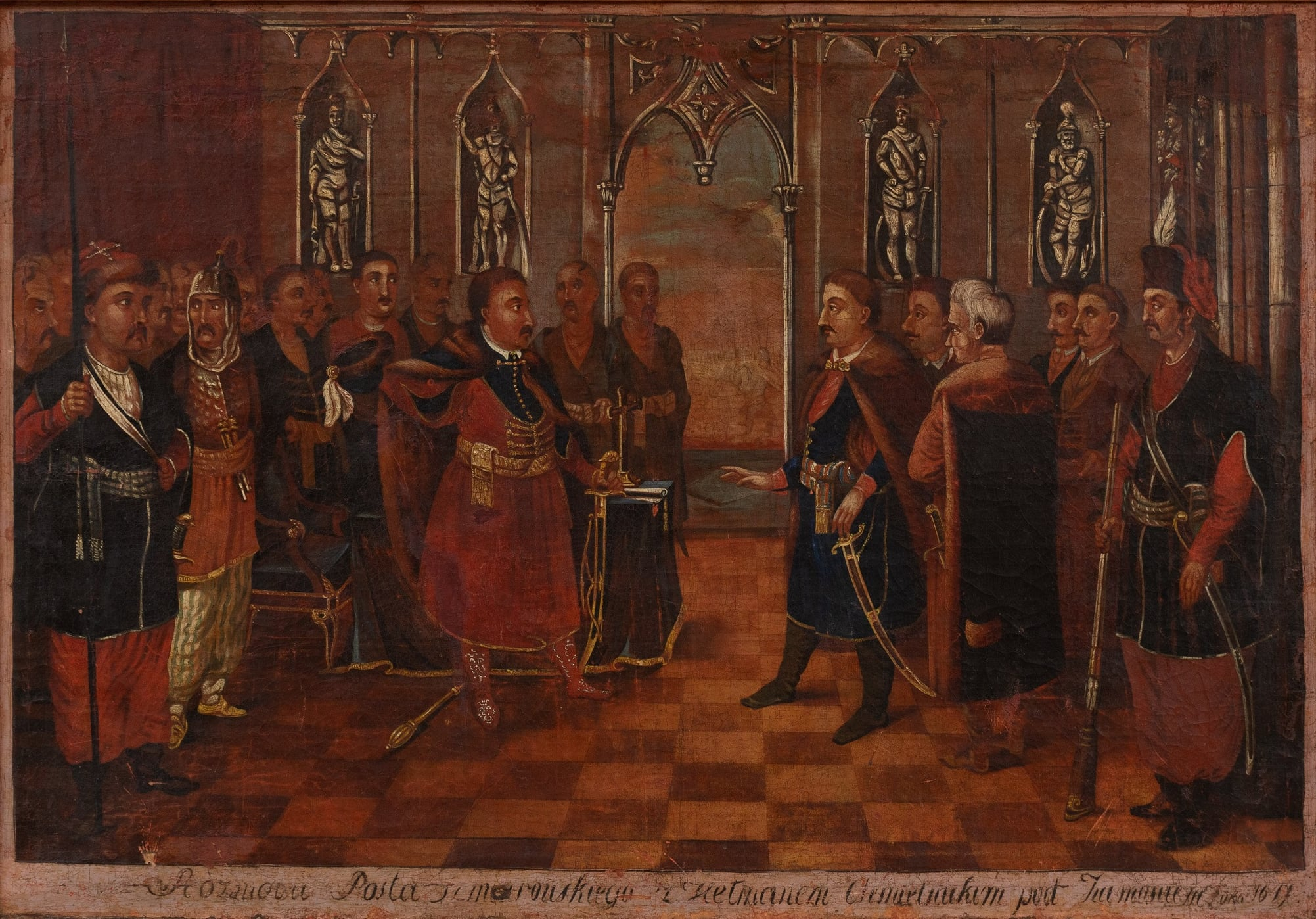
Jakub Śmiarowski envoy of Polish King John II Casimir Vasa to Bohdan Khmelnytsky near Zamość 1648. Unknown author, 18th century

The Truce of Zamość was signed on 20 November 1648 during the siege of Zamość between the King of Poland John II Casimir of Poland and the Hetman of Zaporizhian Host Bohdan Khmelnytsky. The treaty ended Khmelnytsky's campaign of 1648, and no major hostilities took place for two months until January–February 1649 (in southern Belarus), after which the Truce of Pereiaslav (1649) was concluded on 14 (24) February 1649, which would last three months.

== Background ==
The truce ended the first campaign of Bohdan Khmelnytsky's army into the territory of modern Poland. During the siege of Zamość that started two weeks prior to the signing of the truce on November 6, 1648, Bohdan Khmelnytsky had established diplomatic relations with government circles of the Polish–Lithuanian Commonwealth. His aim was to use the elections of a new King of Poland for insurgents' purposes. For tactical reasons the Hetman supported the candidacy of John II Casimir of Poland, hoping that John Casimir would be more amenable to a peace favorable to Khmelnytsky than the other candidates. The Hetman's hopes came true. After the election of King John II Casimir Vasa, a true was signed at Zamość (the siege of the city of Zamość was lifted on 24 November 1648).

== Negotiations ==
In the negotiations with diplomatic mission from the Cossack's side there was the brother of Hetman Zakhary Khmelnytsky, while the Polish–Lithuanian Commonwealth was represented by a priest Andrzej Mokrski (former teacher of Bohdan Khmelnytsky), noblemen J. Smiarowski and S. Oldakowski.

=== Main points ===
- Amnesty to the insurgents
- Liquidation of the Union of Brest
- Reinstatement of previous rights and freedoms of the Cossacks
- Ban on the quartering of Polish Crown Army troops in the lands of the Cossack Hetmanate
- Subordination of the Hetman directly to the King

In the future, it was planned to establish a lasting peace, for which to the residence of Hetman in the beginning of 1649 had come a "committee" of the Commonwealth headed by Adam Kisiel.

== Results ==
The truce was a compromise. It had supporters and opponents on both the Ukrainian as well as the Polish side. Having concluded an armistice, Khmelnytskyi avoided the need to continue the campaign in late autumn during an epidemic that erupted in the Cossack army, which could have resulted in dire consequences for the insurgents. However, by signing the truce, the Hetman was forced to withdraw Cossack troops from most of the western-Ukrainian cities and partially from Podillia (Podolia). The truce of Zamość was lasted about two months.. The Commonwealth was the first to openly break it when the forces of the Grand Duchy of Lithuania conducted a raid into southern Belarus in January–February 1649 (see Siege of Babruysk and Battle of Mazyr). Another truce was signed later in Pereiaslav on 14 (24) November 1649, which would last three months.

== See also ==
- List of treaties
