= Stina, Vinnytsia Oblast =

Stina, a village in Ukraine, formerly a medieval town

Stina Стіна
- Village
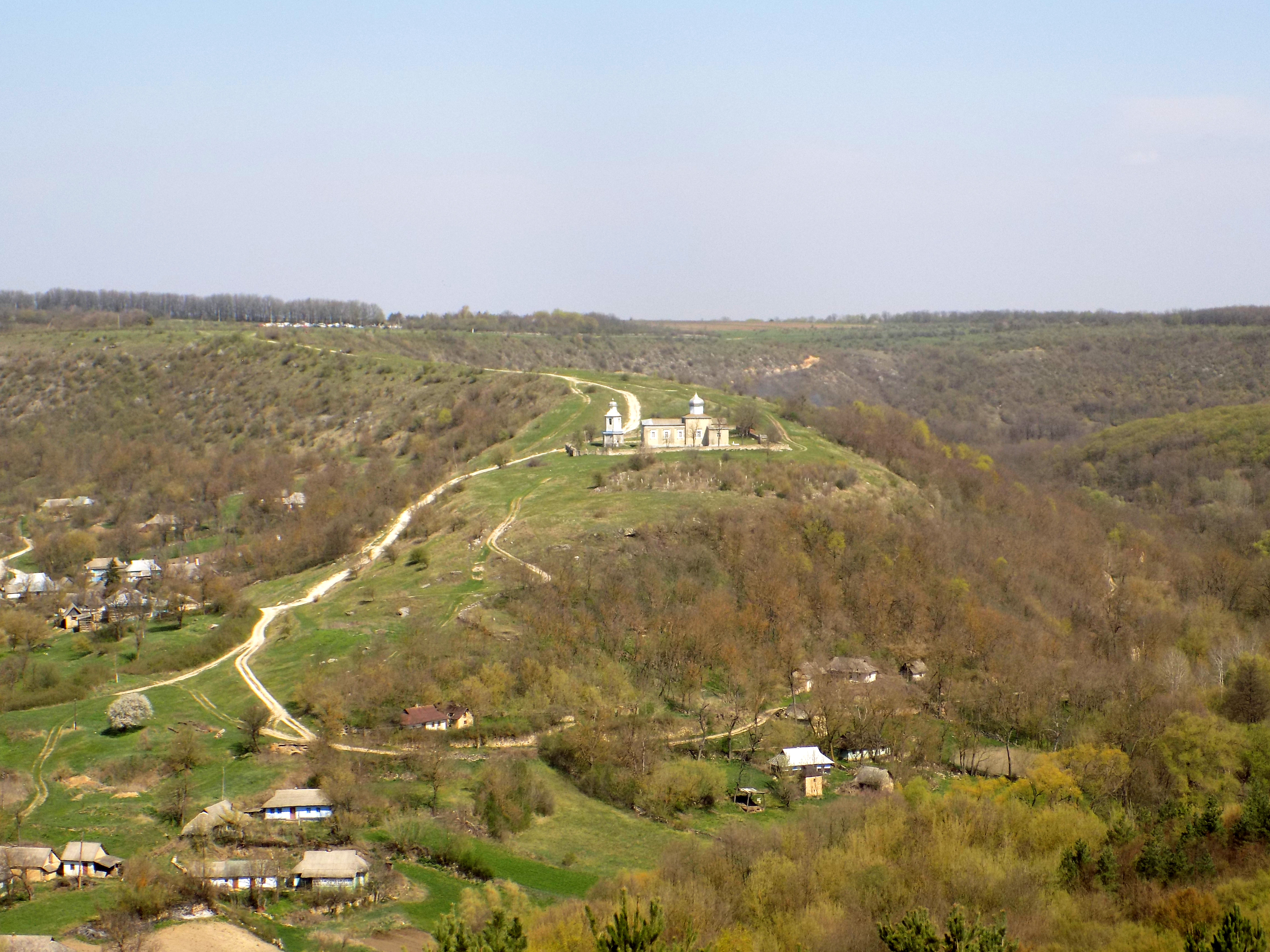
- View on the Castle Hill
- Interactive map of Stina
- Coordinates: 48°27′21″N 28°25′04″E
- Country: Ukraine
- Oblast: Vinnytsia Oblast
- Raion: Tulchyn Raion
- Hromada: Tomashpil settlement hromada
- Elevation: 196 m (643 ft)

Population
  - Total: 650
- Postal code: 24231

Stina (Ukrainian: Стіна; earlier known as Yanhorod and Chorne) is a village in Ukraine, in Tomashpil settlement hromada of Tulchyn Raion in Vinnytsia Oblast. This village has approximately 1025 recorded people according to a 2001 census. There is no further information regarding the census of 2002 and beyond due to the census data in Ukraine being suspended from the ongoing war.[1]

== Geography ==
The village has a hilly terrain. Solontsi Mountain (highest), White Mountain, Shpyl (the Spire), Zamkova Hora (Castle Hill), Boliachka Mountain, Kolka (smallest). Based on a survey of local residents and a map of forestry around Stina in 1891, it was possible to identify some historical toponyms (see gallery). The village is partly located in the lowlands, in the valley of the Rusava River, on both its banks, partly on steep slopes, partly on Zamkova Hora (Castle Hill). The latter once housed the historic center of the town.

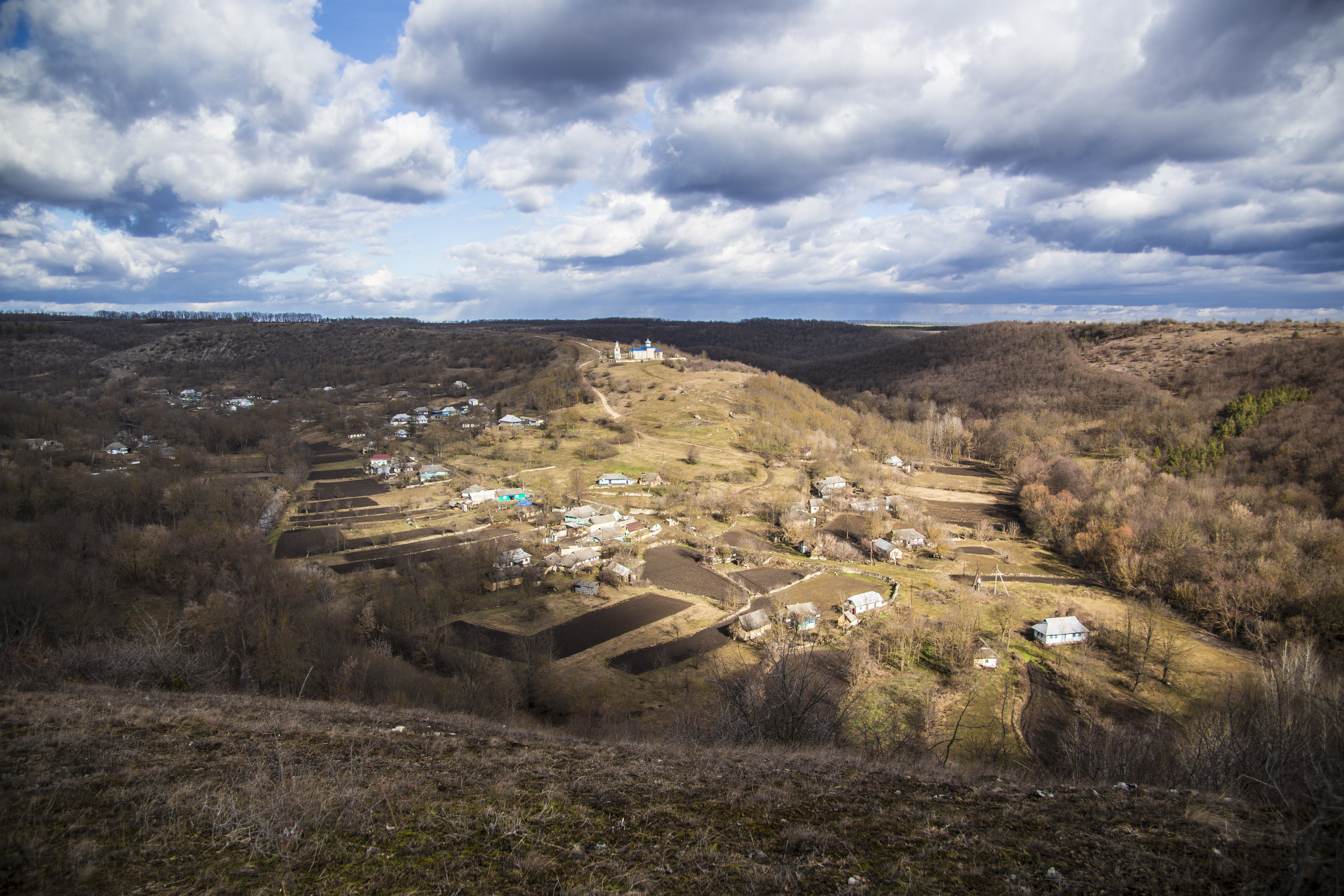
Castle Hill (in the photo illuminated by sun), around which the ancient town of Stina was located

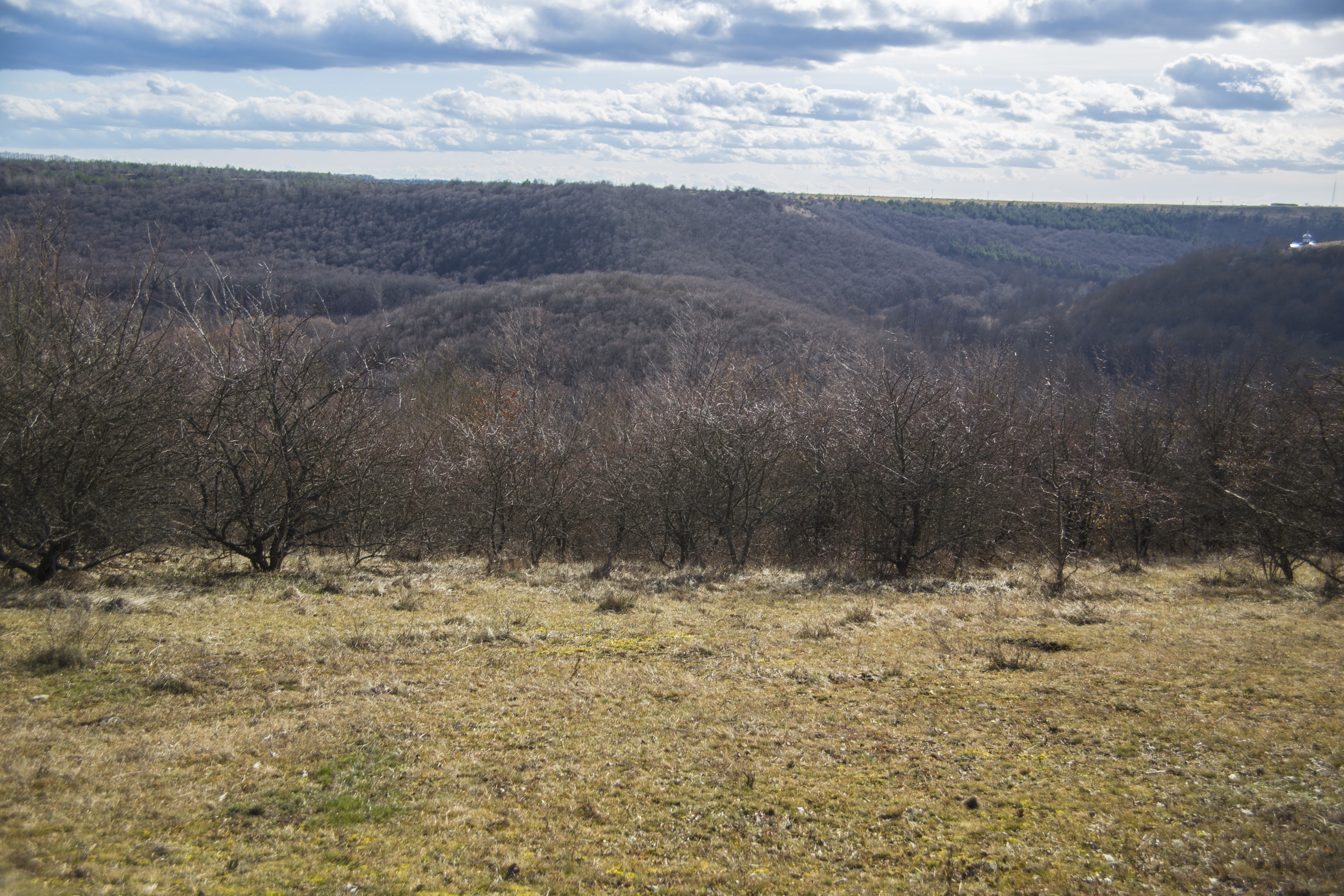
The view of the "Shpyl" (the Spire) mountain on the opposite bank of the Rusava River from the village

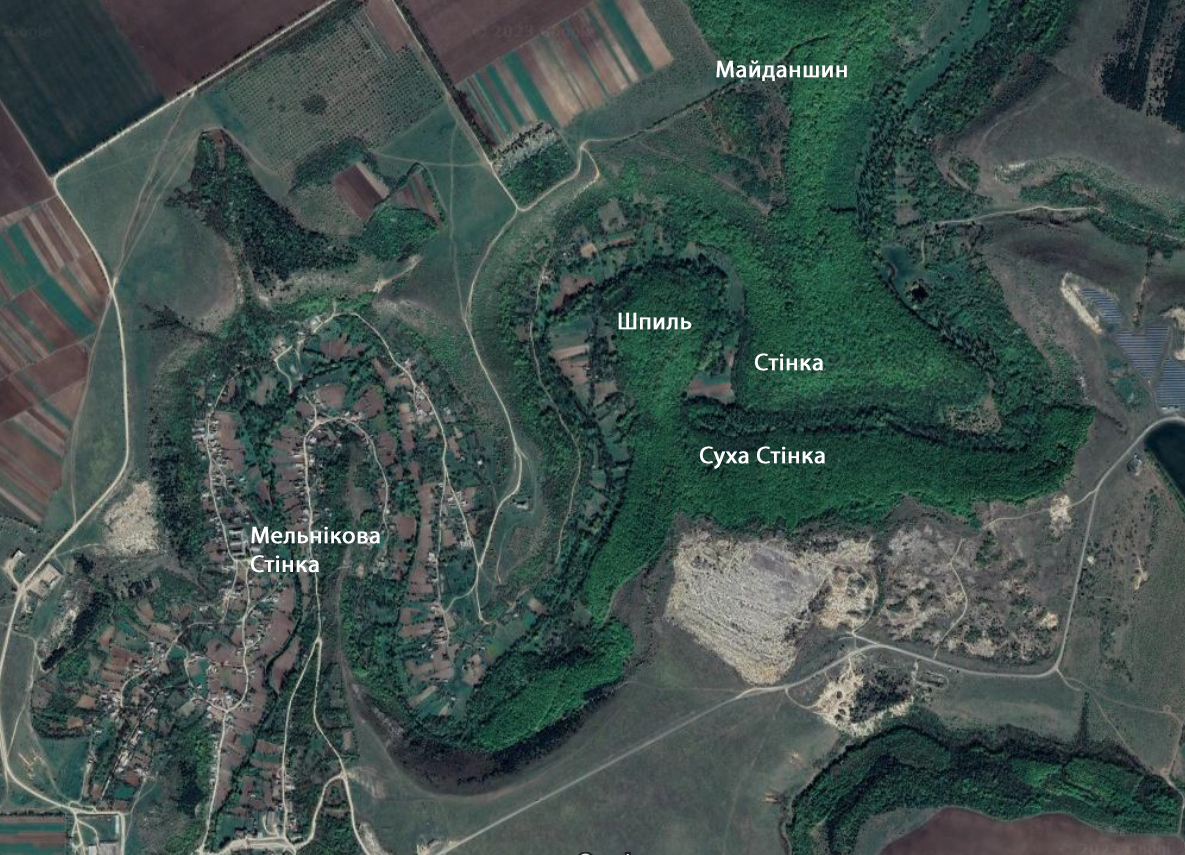
Toponyms of Stina according to historical cartography

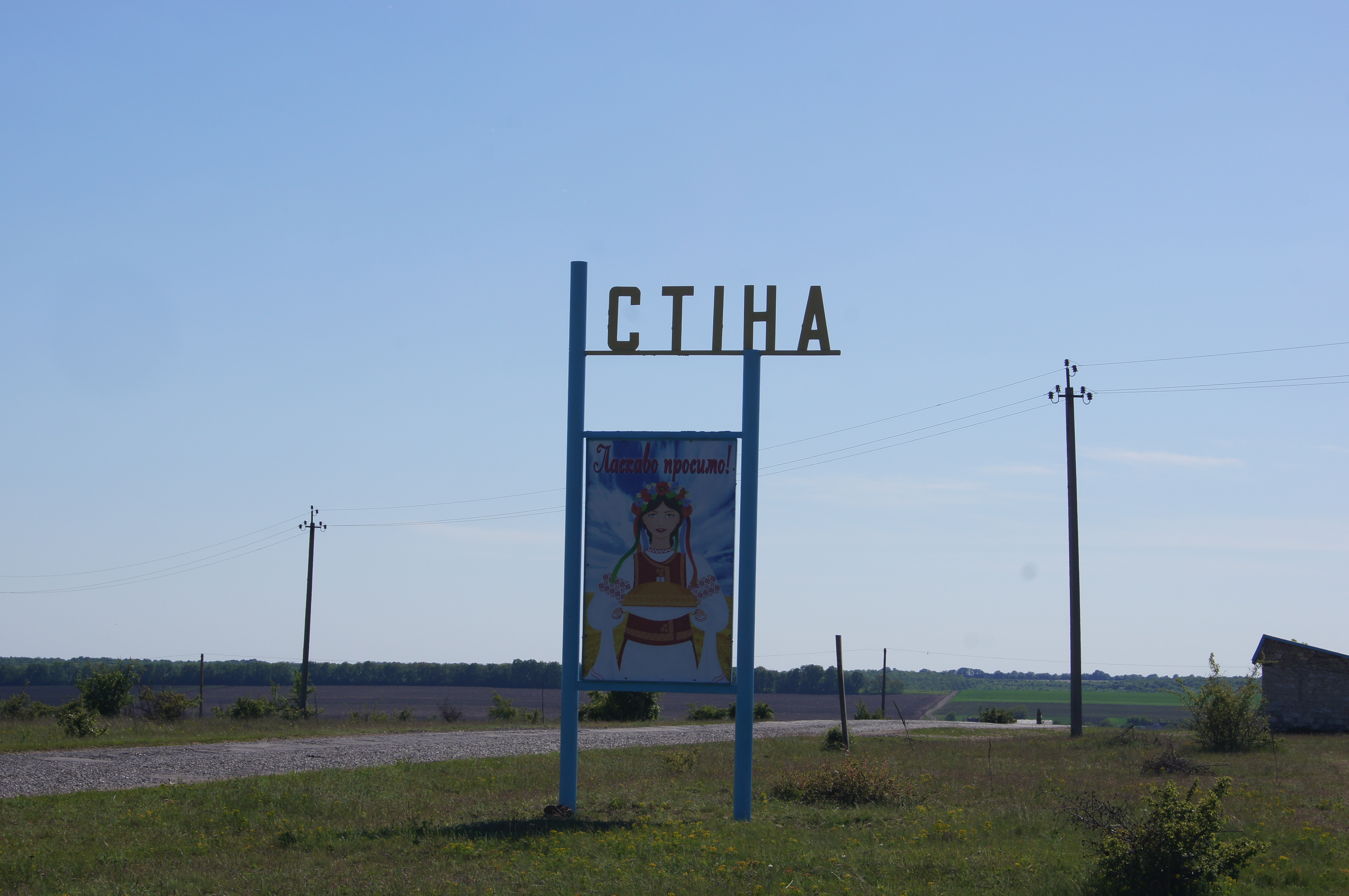
Welcome sign at the entrance to the village

== History ==
On the territory of Stina a mega-settlement of the Trypillia culture was excavated by archaeological expeditions in the 20th century.

Throughout its history, the village had several names: Yanhorod, Chorne and Stina. In 1586, Stina belonged to Janusz Ostrogski. In the beginning of 17th century Stina passed to the Zamoyski family and was allegedly renamed to Janhorod after Jan Zamoyskyi. His son Tomasz Zamoyskyi worked on improving fortifications in the area and in Stina.

In the 1650s, there was a fortress on the Zamkova Hora (Castle Hill). The fortress contained a trihedral castle. The impregnability of Stina's castle is eloquently testified by the description made by the Turkish traveler Evliya Celebi in his "Book of Travels" after he visited these lands in the fall of 1657 during the raid of the Tatar army. The defence of Stina fortress played a key role in 1651 theater of battles during the National-Liberation War of Ukrainian cossacks against Rzech Pospolyta.

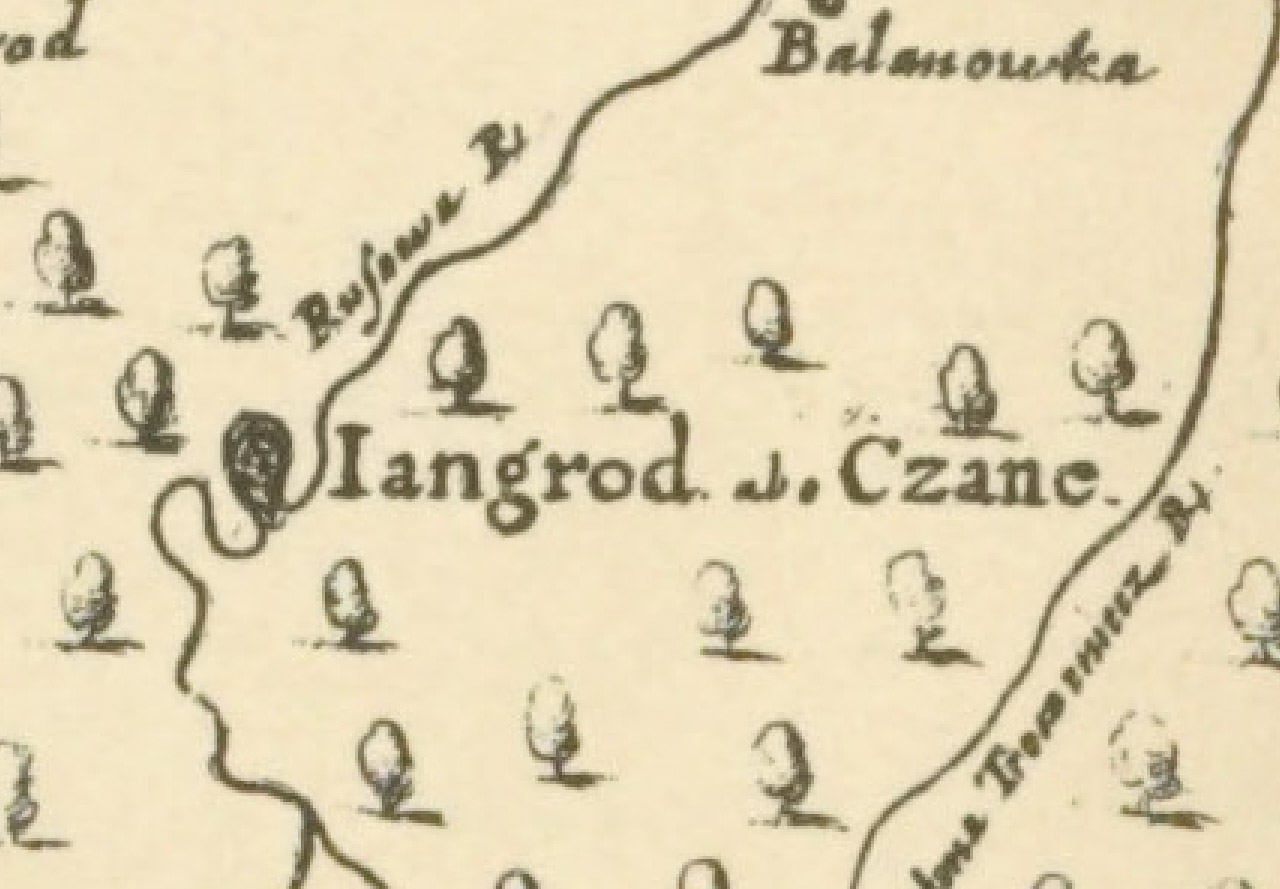
Jangorod or Chorne on the maps of XVII century

Around 1734, Chaliy Sava and his squad took part in the Haydamak uprising on the side of the centurion (or colonel) Verlan (in Uman, he took the oath of allegiance to Russia in the person of Colonel Polanovsky, who was sent to Podillia to support the candidacy for the throne of the Polish-Lithuanian Commonwealth of Augustus III). At the head of the hundred soldiers he took the city of Stina (Polish: Ścianę), also Sharhorod, from which he took the property of the landowners, the nobles.

During the Holodomor of 1932-33, 200 residents of the village died. At the beginning of May 2019, a monument to the victims of the Holodomor and political repressions was opened. According to the inventory of the village in 1845, which then belonged to Ludvyk from the Sobanski family, there were 660 men and 658 women in Stina.

On June 12, 2020, in accordance with the Decree of the Cabinet of Ministers of Ukraine dated No. 707-r "On the determination of administrative centers and approval of the territories of territorial hromadas of Vinnytsia Oblast", it became part of the Tomashpil settlement hromada.

On July 17, 2020, as a result of the administrative and territorial reform and liquidation of Tomashpil Raion, it became part of the newly formed Tulchyn Raion.

== Sights ==
=== Church of St. Nicholas ===
Legend has it that when they were digging trenches under the foundation, commissioned by Stefan Nechai, an icon of St. Nicholas was uncovered and a church was built on that place. A hundred years later, the church was completed and a bell tower was built. In 1654, the church was already active in the village. The icon was in the church until 1901.

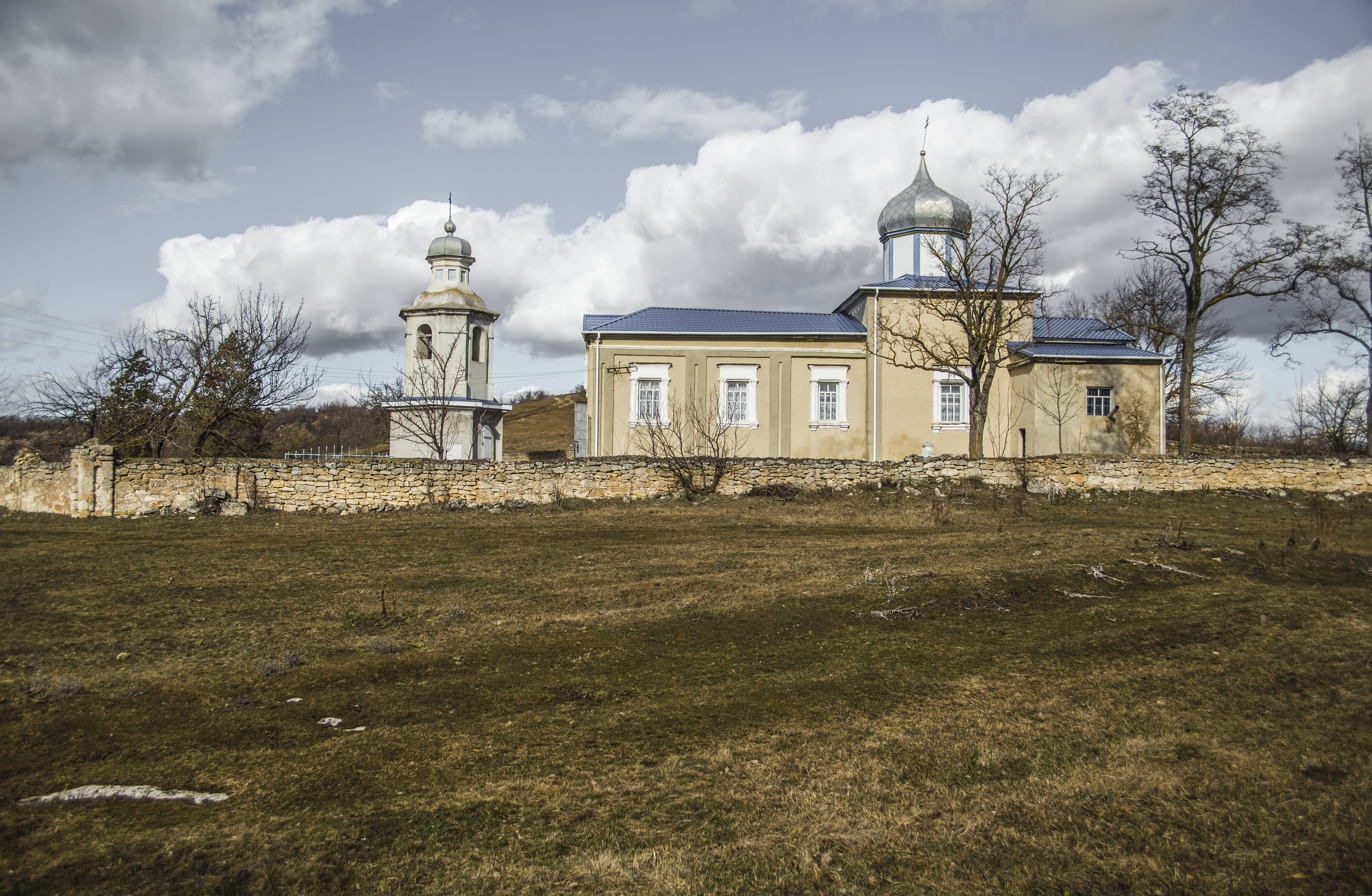
Church of St. Nicholas, 19th century

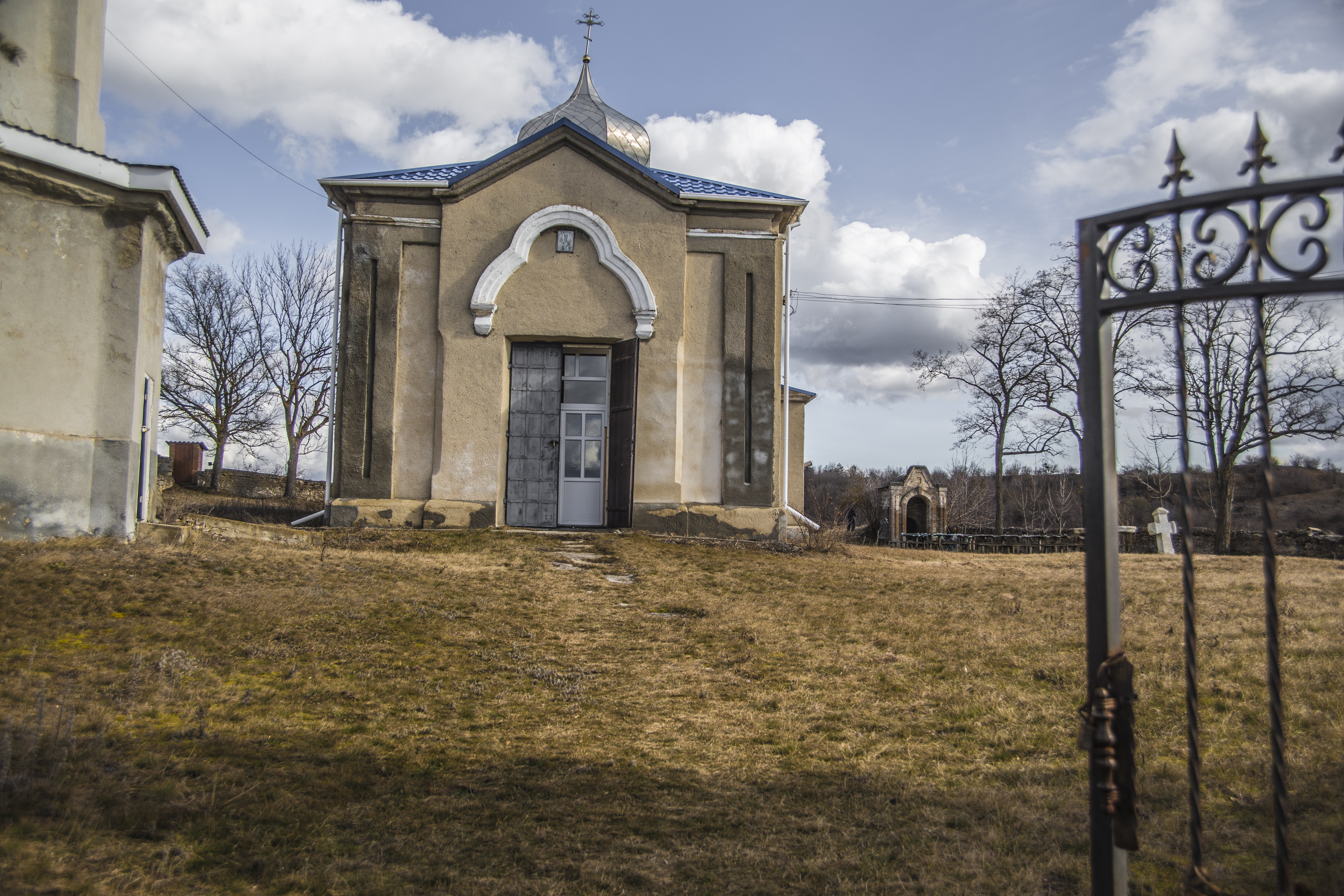
The western facade of the church with neo-gothic framing

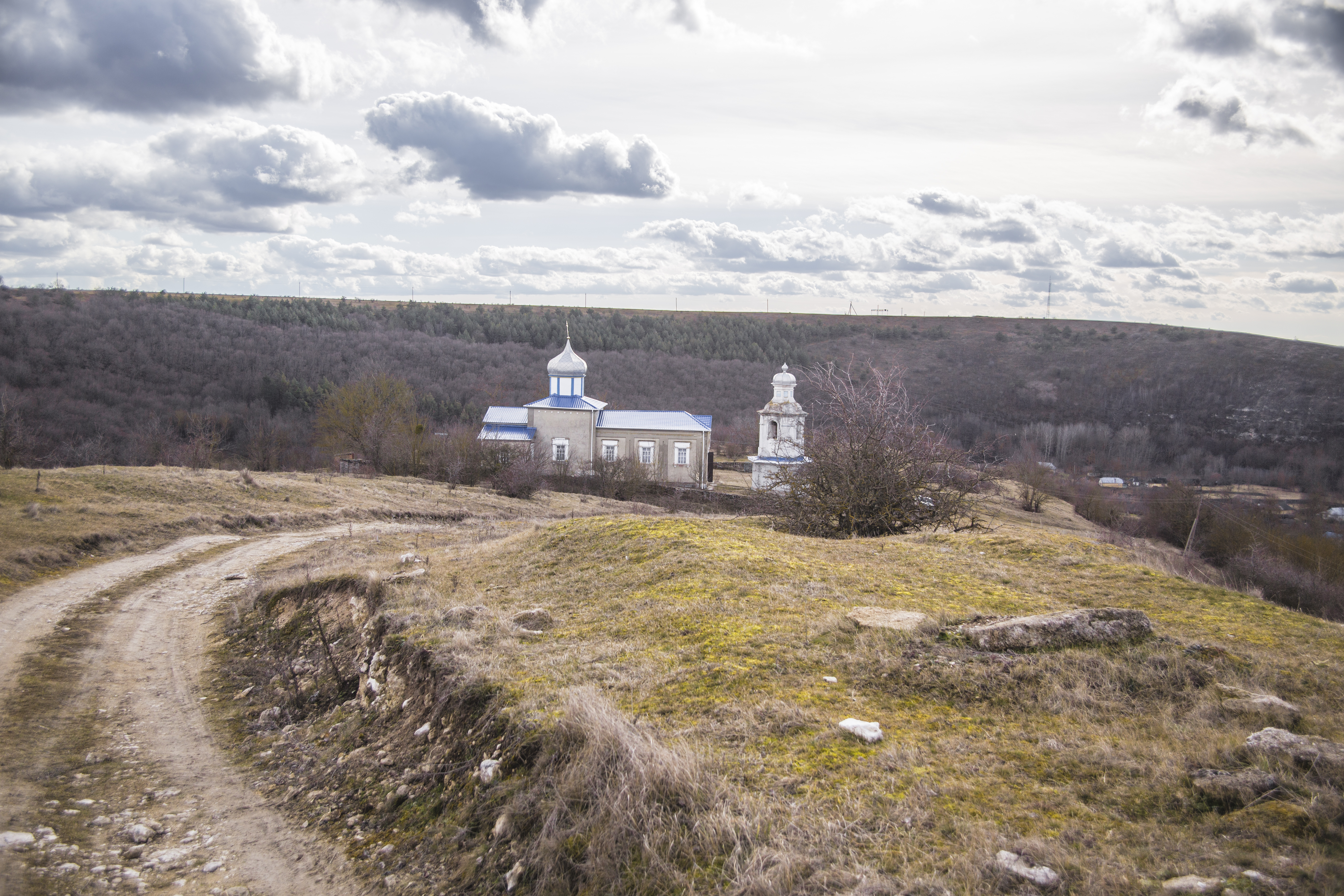
View from the side of the old entrance to the city

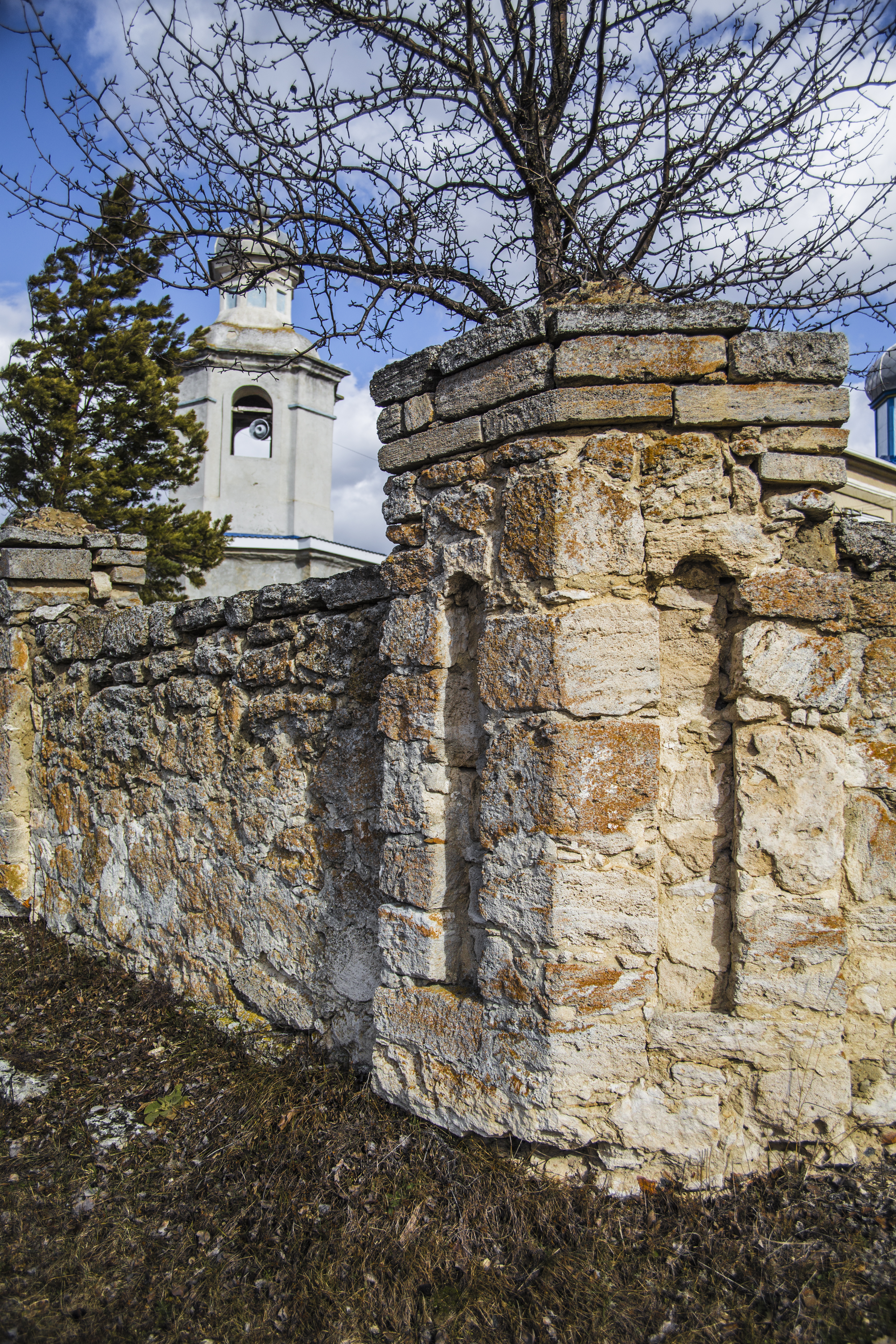
Church fence, beginning of 19th century

=== Ancient fortifications ===
Not far from the cemetery and the tract "Sonna Poliana", on the promontory to which the road from Zamkova Hora (Castle Hill) leads, there are the remains of a shaft-ditch fortification, not far from the beginning of the forest, with a gap in the middle. The shaft cuts through the isthmus of the cape in its shortest part. On the historical plan of the 1860s, this place is signed as "Zamchysko". According to Verdum, the castle had a triangular shape and was located at the end of the mountain.

=== Cossack cemetery ===
The cemetery near the church of St. Nicholas is popularly called "Cossack" (by analogy with the "Cossack" cemetery in Busha and other Podillia towns), although the appearance of the existing stone tombstones as well as the epigraphy indicate that the graves date back to the 19th century. The wall of the fence is partially dismantled, the state of the tombstones varies from unsatisfactory to emergency. The most common type of cross is the Latin cross, with a circle in the center of the cross, although Maltese and Greek crosses are also found.

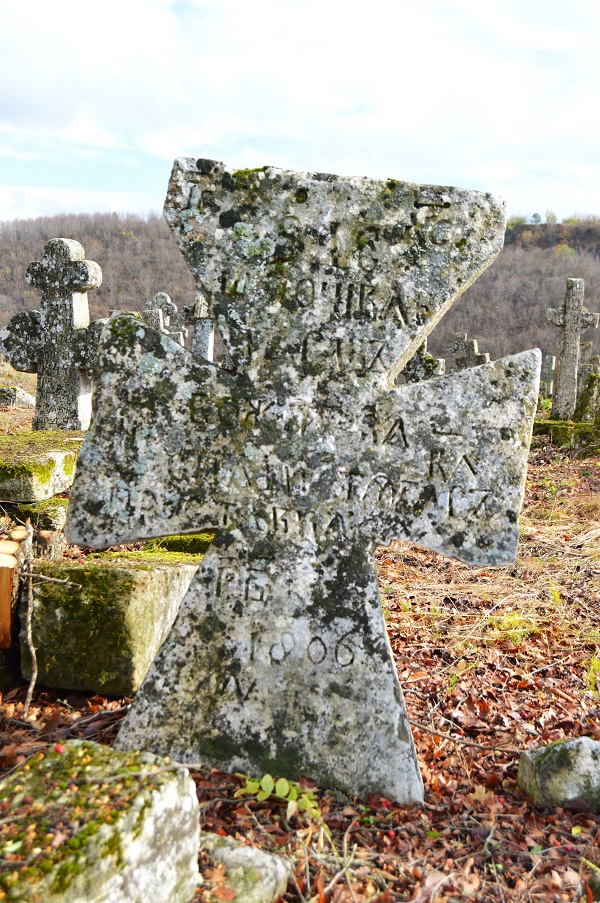
Maltese style (Cossack) crosses in Stina

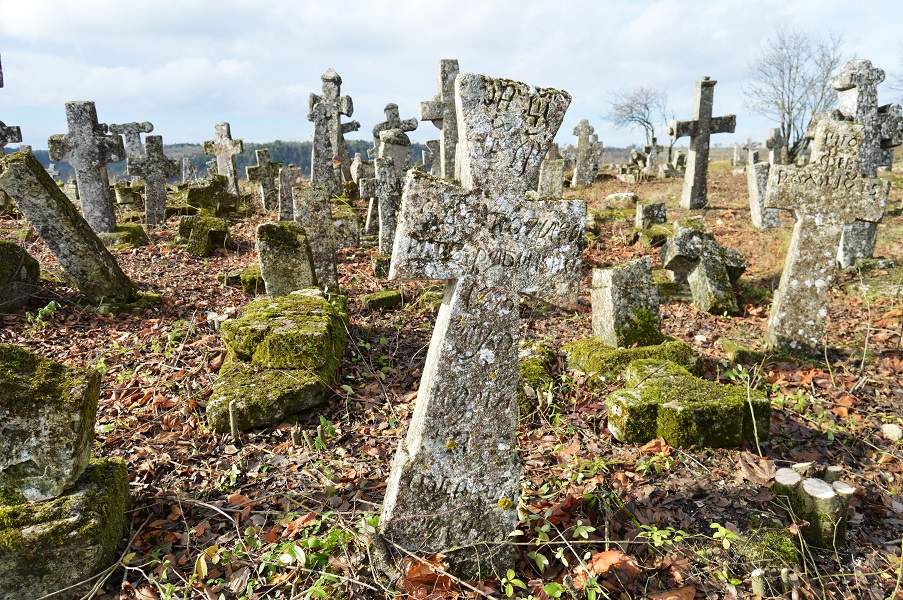
Crosses of the old cemetery in Stina

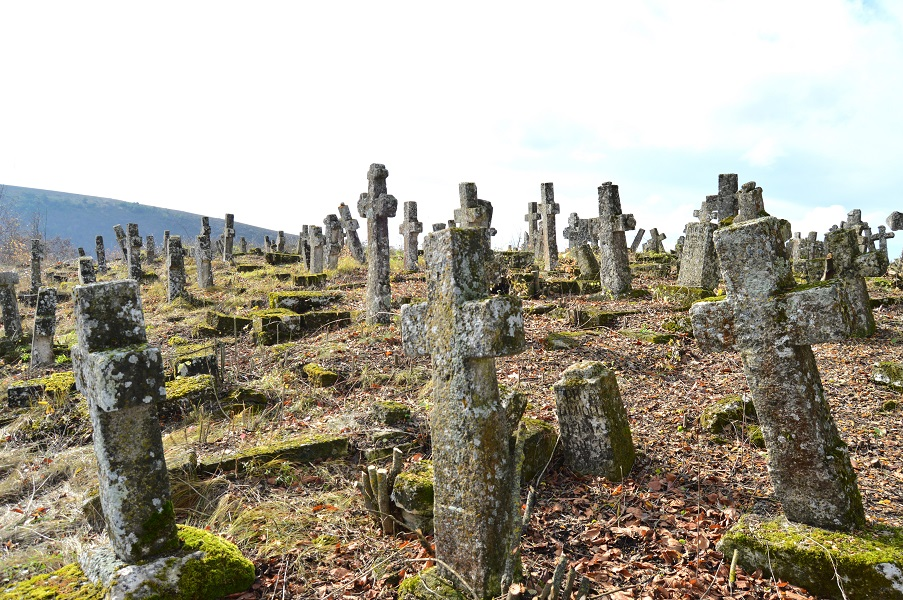
View of the Cossack cemetery in Stina after cleaning shrubs in 2023

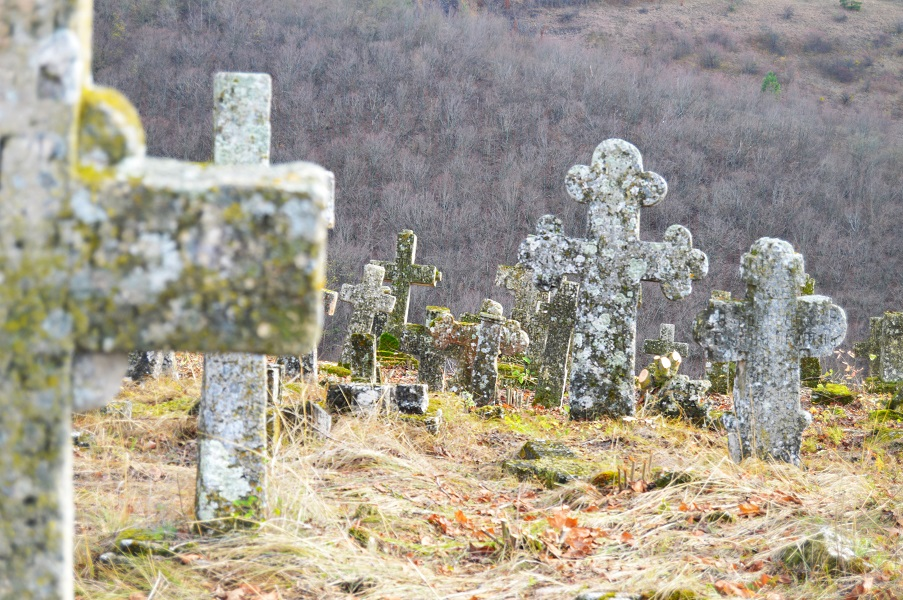
There are several types of crosses on the Cossack cemetery

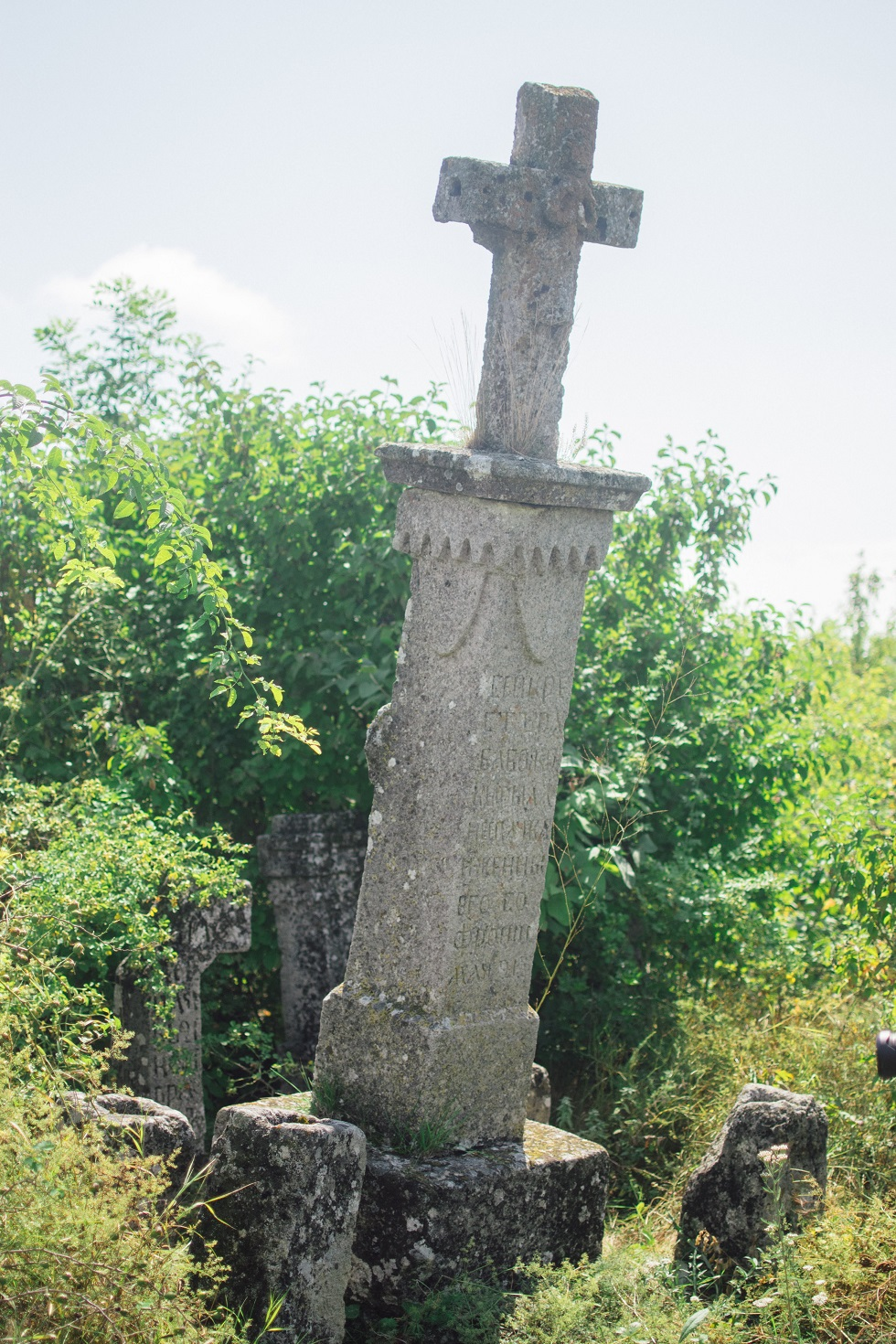
The grave, probably of the priest of the church of St. Mykolai

== Defence of Stina ==
According to the register of the Treaty of Zboriv in 1649, the Cossack harrison of Stina numbered 48 registered Cossacks. In the first decade of February 1651, Bratslav colonel D. Nechay began to strengthen harrisons in Yampil, Stina, Krasne, and Sharhorod.

On February 27, 1651, Marcin Kalinowski moved with his troops to Shargorod. In view of this, the Yampil centurion I. Oleksandrenko gathers an army in the well-fortified Stina. On March 2, 1651, the Poles captured Chernivtsi, and on March 3 they approached Stina. Here the local peasants began to fire at the Poles with handmade pistols and bows. The nobility was surprised that the boys shot so accurately. After the first losses, the peasants retreated from the farms to the lower position of the fortress. The Poles, after looting the goods left in the farms, came under the walls of the fortified Stina. M. Kalinowski demanded to surrender and pay a ransom, and after the refusal, he began an assault. After a hard fight, the Cossacks and peasants left the lower rampart and retreated to the protection of the higher fortress, which, thanks to its favorable natural location, was almost impregnable.

For two days, the Poles stormed the fortress walls of Stina but without success, and the losses were very high. Sensing the dissatisfaction of his army and considering the need to save forces for the assault on Vinnytsia, M. Kalinowski resorted to a trick. On March 5, he ordered the main part of his 15,000-strong army to retreat to Chernivtsi, and he left three Polish horse units in ambush near Stina. When the defenders started to leave the city, they were attacked by the Poles. In this confrontation, 150 people were killed on the part of the Cossacks and peasants, but the Poles still could not capture the fortress.

After the capture of Yampil, the Poles returned to the walls of Stina, where the troops left in ambush kept the siege.

On March 6, M. Kalinowski held a military meeting near Stina, at which it was decided to leave Stina and go to Vinnytsia. They demanded a ransom of 4,000 zlotys from the residents, but they received only 1,000 zlotys. With such a failure, the Polish forces went to Vinnytsia. There, the detachments of Mikolaj Potocki joined the military forces of Stanislaw Lanckoronski (who suffered a defeat at Southern Bug). The combined forces continued to storm Vinnytsia. However, Ivan Bohun managed to hold the city, and later pushed the Poles back to Bar. In general, the delay of the Polish troops under Stina significantly undermined the Polish forces and enabled Bohun to organize an effective defense of the main fortified cities.

== Culture ==
Stina is a well-known embroidery center in eastern Podillia. Black and red colors occupied a special place in the embroidery of Stina.

== Economy ==
Social enterprise Vereta recycles used items into eco-mats, covers and bags that are in high demand. The collected funds are used to pay the craftsmen, support the local choir, promote the village and develop the enterprise itself, in order to stimulate local residents to cooperate, as well as to encourage young people to learn about the ancient craft.

Also in the village is the "Eco-Center Stina", which was founded by non-governmental organizations from Vinnytsia as a place of cooperation with the local community for the implementation of various projects in the field of non-formal education, culture, and youth work. Since 2017, "Eco-Center Stina" has involved many young people in non-formal education projects both in the village and abroad. Since 2022, "Stina Eco-Center" has started to actively engage in green/rural tourism.

== Nature ==
On the outskirts of the village there is a nature reserve of local importance "Sonna Poliana", where the relict plant of the pasqueflower blooms every year. According to the legend, a few centuries ago, a civilian population lived in Sonna Poliana. The Turks attacked them and several dozen people remained alive. That area was called "Posichi" for a long time, and the people who remained alive moved to live closer to the church and the river.

There were caves with ancient inscriptionson on the walls in Stina, as well as caves that led to neighboring villages. The entrance to the caves was opened in the 20th century. The cave was located near the tract "Stinka" and was called Yalanetska.

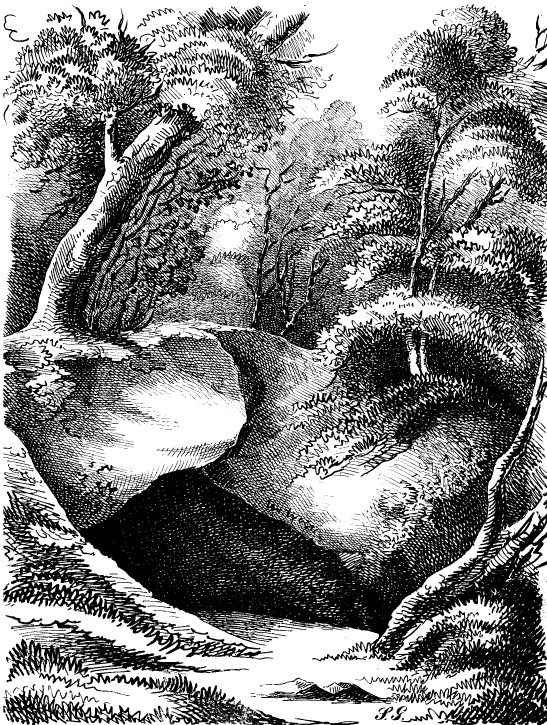
Yalanetska cave in Stina on the picture of the 19th century.

== Notable people ==
- Kelbas Hlib Demianovych — Hero of the Soviet Union
- Liadovskyi Mykola Musiyovych (1923—2001) — painter
- Nadiya Sidak — poet
- Mykola Komisarchuk — poet

== See also ==
- The defence of Stina (1651)
- Stina, Ukraine – a Cucuteni–Trypillia mega-settlement
