= Battle of Mazyr =

1649 battle

- Part of the Khmelnytsky Uprising
Date	8–9 February 1649
Location	Mazyr, Minsk Voivodeship, Polish–Lithuanian Commonwealth
Result	Polish–Lithuanian victory

Belligerents
Polish–Lithuanian Commonwealth	Zaporozhian Host

Commanders and leaders
Janusz Radziwiłł; Adam Pawłowicz; Dzienaj Romanowski; Dawid Kiński; Dowgiałło	Colonel Mykhenko †

Strength
11,000 Polish–Lithuanian hussars and cavalry	Unknown

Casualties and losses
Unknown	Unknown

The Battle of Mazyr (Belarusian: Бітва пад Мазыром, Ukrainian: Битва під Мозирем, Polish: Bitwa pod Mozyrzem; 8–9 February 1649) was fought between the Polish–Lithuanian Commonwealth against the Zaporozhian Host as a part of the Khmelnytsky Uprising. Near the city of Mazyr in present-day Belarus, the Polish–Lithuanian Commonwealth’s forces under the command of Prince Janusz Radziwiłł, Adam Pawłowicz, Dzienaj Romanowski, Dawid Kiński and Dowgiałło captured the city of Mazyr, attacked and defeated a forces of the Zaporozhian Cossacks under the command of Colonel Mykhenko, who was killed in the battle.

When the Zaporozhian Cossacks during the Khmelnytsky Uprising reached the Belarusian lands of the Polish–Lithuanian Commonwealth in 1648, it forced the army of the Grand Duchy of Lithuania of the Polish–Lithuanian Commonwealth to act and start a military actions against the Zaporozhian Cossacks in 1649.

The strong forces of the Crown Army numbered around 11,000 men under the command of Prince Janusz Radziwiłł moved to fight against the Zaporozhian Cossacks. In February 1649, Janusz Radziwiłł left the Polish–Lithuanian camps in Turiv and set off towards the city of Mazyr with only a cavalry. The entire Polish–Lithuanian Commonwealth’s forces were preceded by an advance guard commanded by Adam Pawłowicz, which included, among others, three Crimean Tatar’s banners which was commanded by Dzienaj Romanowski, Dawid Kiński and Dowgiałło. In the night 8–9 February 1649, Adam Pawłowicz’s bivouac Polish–Lithuanian troops were unexpectedly attacked by a group of several hundred Zaporozhian Cossacks. On the morning of 9 February 1649, the main forces of the Crown Army came to the aid of the defending troops of the advance guard, which caused the Zaporozhian Cossacks to retreat to the Mazyr fortress. The attempt to capture the Mazyr fortress on the march failed, so the Prince Janusz Radziwiłł hurried the entire cavalry (including the reiters led by Ganchof) and sent it to attack the earthworks. After a hard battle, the Mazyr fortress was captured by the Polish–Lithuanian Commonwealth’s forces.

The victorious Crown Army started burning the city of Mazyr and its inhabitants suffered serious casualties and losses because, according to Bogusław Maskiewicz, a participant in the events, the German mercenary reiters were particularly cruel to the civilian population of the captured city of Mazyr. After the fighting ended, the captured Zaporozhian Cossack prisoners were beheaded and impaled, including a commander of the Zaporozhian Cossacks Colonel Mykhenko, who was killed in the battle.
