= Marek Sobieski (1628–1652) =

Polish nobleman (1628–1652)

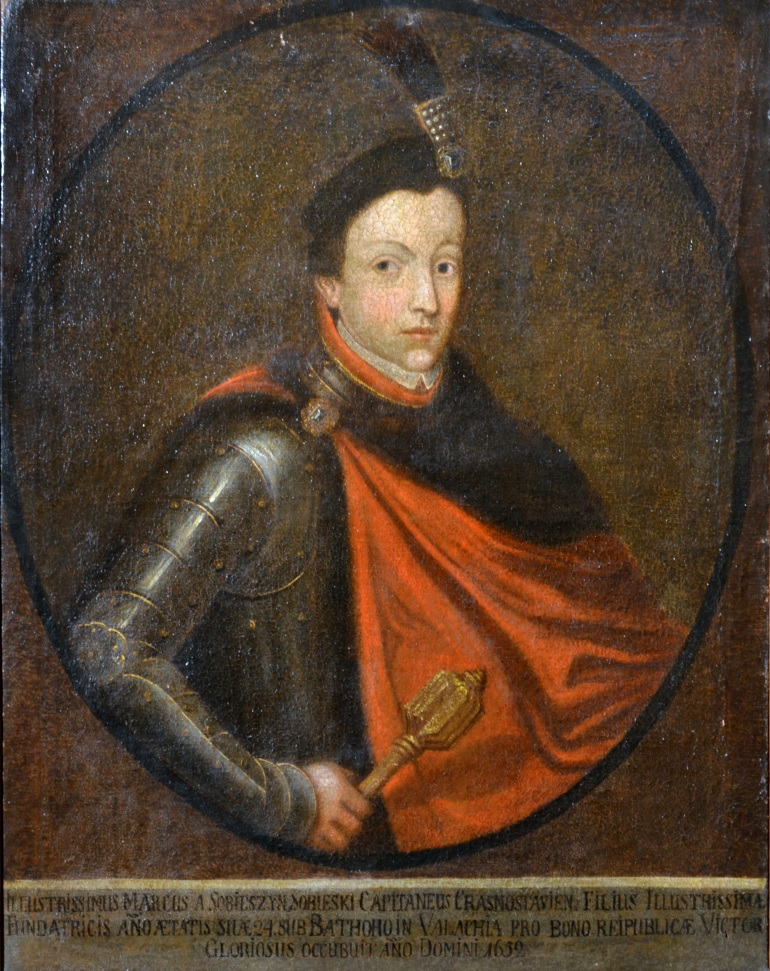
- Coat of arms: Janina
- Born: 24 May 1628; Złoczów, Polish–Lithuanian Commonwealth
- Died: 3 June 1652 (aged 24); Batoh, Ukraine
- Buried: 1655; Żółkiew, Polish–Lithuanian Commonwealth
- Noble family: Sobieski
- Father: Jakub Sobieski
- Mother: Teofila Zofia Daniłłowicz
- Occupation: starosta of Krasnystaw and Jaworów

Marek Sobieski (24 May 1628 – 3 June 1652) was a Polish nobleman, starosta (tenant of the Crown lands) of Krasnystaw and Jaworów, and the older brother of King John III Sobieski of Poland. He graduated from Nowodworek College in Kraków and Kraków Academy, then traveled and studied in Western Europe. After returning to Poland in 1648 he fought against the Cossacks and Tatars at the Siege of Zbaraż and at the Battle of Beresteczko. He was taken captive by Tatars in 1652 and then killed by Cossacks.

== Childhood and studies ==
Sobieski was the oldest child of Jakub Sobieski and his second wife Teofila Zofia Daniłłowicz. He was born on 24 May 1628 in Zolochiv and spent his childhood in Zhovkva. He grew up in a patriotic family, and his mother often took him and his brother to the grave of her grandfather Stanisław Żółkiewski, Grand Hetman of the Crown, who was killed in the battle of Cecora in 1620. Zofia Teofila Daniłłowicz taught her sons the inscription upon their great-grandfather's grave: "O quam dulce et decorum est pro patria mori!" (How sweet and glorious it is to die for one's homeland!). On 29 October 1639 Sobieski became Starosta of Yavoriv.

Along with his brother John, beginning in 1640, Sobieski studied at the Nowodworski College in Kraków. On 29 April 1642 Sobieski made a speech on funeral of Jakub Zadzik, bishop of Kraków. The next year, on 2 June 1643, Sobieski made a speech where he thanked absent Władysław IV for everything he had done for Nodworski College. Two months earlier, in April 1643, Marek and John Sobieski began studies at Kraków Academy. In 1644 Sobieski became Starosta of Krasnystaw.

In 1645 Jakub Sobieski, father of Marek and John, prepared special instructions and a guidebook for his sons, who were about to go abroad. Jakub Sobieski, who was inspired by Roman authors, emphasized learning foreign languages and physical exercises. He wanted to prepare his sons to be politicians and diplomats.

After completing their studies in 1646, the brothers started to travel around Europe under the tutelage of Sebastian Gawrecki. They departed Żółkiew on 21 February or 25 March 1646. They visited Berlin, Wittenberg, Leipzig, Halle, Amsterdam and Paris, where they arrived on 9 June 1646. They spent the next 16 months in France. In October 1647 Marek and John Sobieski went to England and subsequently studied mathematics in the Netherlands. The brothers had planned to go to Turkey, but after hearing of the Khmelnytsky uprising they decided to return to Poland. Marek and John Sobieski left Brussels on 24 July 1648.

== Adulthood ==
After returning to Poland, Sobieski and his brother came to Zamość, which at the time was being besieged by Cossacks. In 1648, 1649 and 1650 Sobieski was elected a member of the parliament (sejm walny) of the Polish–Lithuanian Commonwealth. In 1649 he was among the electors who voted for John II Casimir as King of Poland. Then, as a head of a chorągiew husarska (military unit formed by Hussars) of 100 horse, the young starosta joined the army of Jeremi Wiśniowiecki.

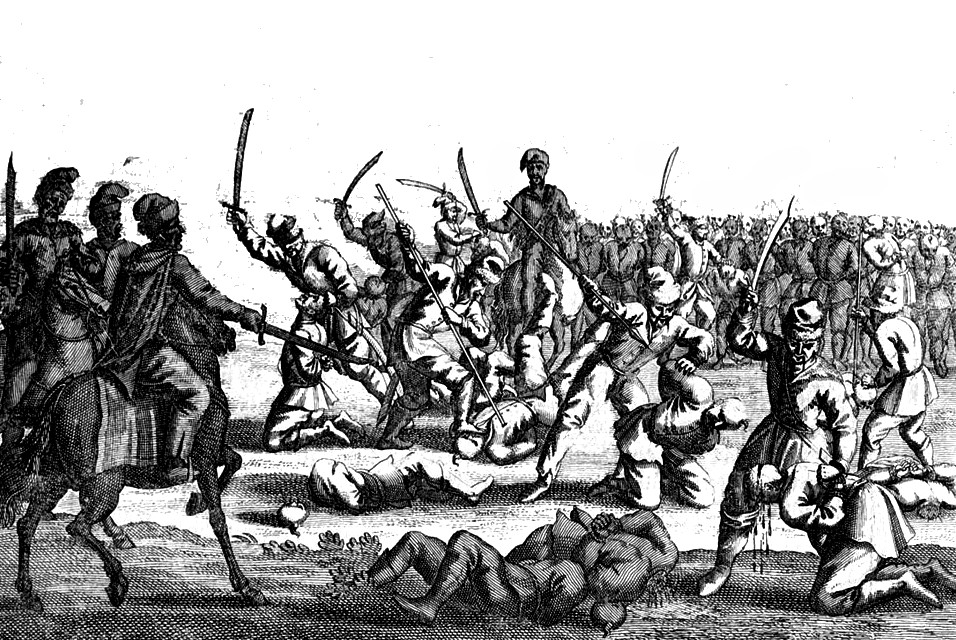
Massacre of Polish captives after the battle of Batoh.

Sobieski was a member of the Polish defense force besieged by Cossacks at Zbarazh from 10 July to 22 August 1649. In 1650 he fought against the Cossacks at Kamieniec Podilskiy. Marek Sobieski also took part in the Battle of Beresteczko on 28–30 June 1651. After the Polish victory, due his bravery, he received a saber of Tugay Bey, who had been killed during the battle. In September 1651 he fought at the Battle of Biała Cerkiew. When the Poles, Cossacks and Tatars began negotiations, Marek Sobieski was sent to the Cossack camp as a guarantor of safety for the Cossack leader, Bohdan Khmelnytsky, who was in the Polish camp.

In 1652 Sobieski fought against the Cossacks near Bracław and during Bila Tserkva campaign. Marching with Jan Odrzywolski, but without his own hussar banner, Sobieski and his retinue came to the field hetman Kalinowski's camp at Batoh on 31 May. Marek Sobieski and Odrzywolski were assigned to command cavalry banners during the subsequent battle, and in that capacity they fought on 1 and 2 June. On 2 June, during the second day of the Battle of Batoh after the defeat of Polish cavalry in the field before the Polish camp, Sobieski commanded a cavalry group, perhaps containing wounded field hetman Kalinowski, that withdrew to the eastern redoubt in Polish camp, where Cossacks destroyed them after bringing artillery. Following Polish soldier Wespazjan Kochowski's writings Sobieski might have been the last Polish commander defending the Polish camp against the Cossack-Tatar army. Young commander was taken prisoner or surrendered, to be ransomed in a future as it was practice of the day, by the Tatars or Cossacks. After the battle, the Cossacks paid the Tatars for possession of the prisoners, and killed the Polish captives in retaliation for Chmielnicki's defeat at Berestechko. Among the 8,000 massacred Polish soldiers was Marek Sobieski. or the number could have been much higher, up to 15,000 killed in action and massacred.

Sobieski's mother returned his body home, and to commemorate her fallen son she founded the Church of the Assumption of Mary in Żółkiew, which was built between 1653 and 1655. Sobieski was buried there in 1655 on the day the church was consecrated. His brother, King John III Sobieski, commissioned a gravestone by Andreas Schlüter, which is now in Zhovka. In 1946 Sobieski's body was taken to the Dominican Holy Trinity Church in Kraków.

== Legacy ==
Sobieski was portrayed by Henryk Sienkiewicz in With Fire and Sword (1884), Antoni Euzebiusz Balicki in Z żaka król (1936) and Jacek Komuda in novel Bohun (2006).
