= Chetvertynivka =

Village in Haisyn Raion

Chetvertynivka Четвертинівка
- Village
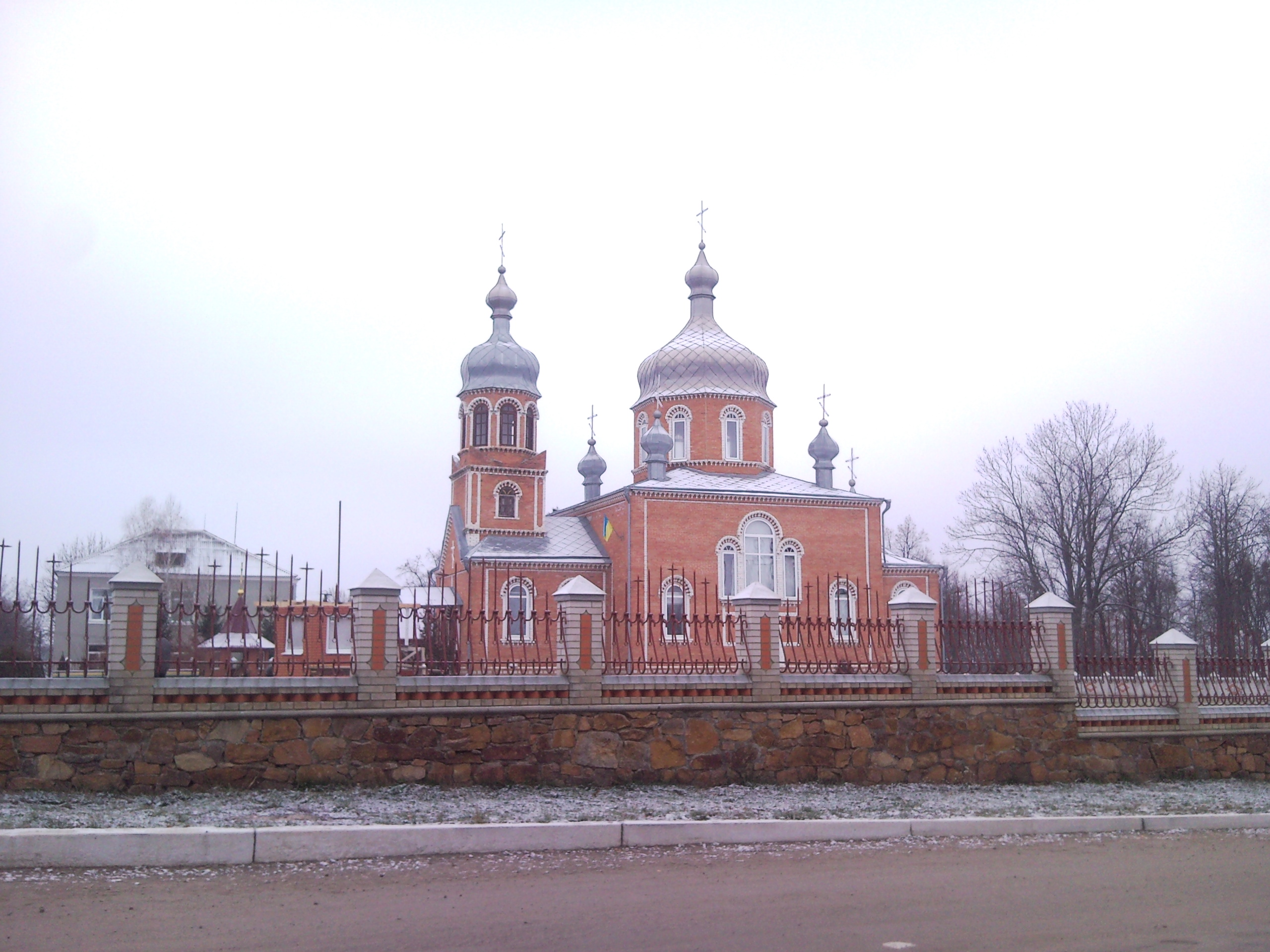
- Church

- Location in Ukraine Chetvertynivka (Ukraine)
- Coordinates: 48°35′50″N 29°16′56″E
- Country: Ukraine
- Oblast: Vinnytsia Oblast
- Raion: Haisyn Raion
- Founded: 1672
- Area: 4.236 km^{2} (1.636 sq mi)
- Elevation: 202 m (663 ft)
- Population (2001): 1,618
- Postal code: 27532
- Area code: +380 5236

Chetvertynivka (Ukrainian: Четвертинівка) is a Ukrainian village in the Haisyn Raion of the Vinnytsia Oblast. Its population as of 2024 was 1,394.

== History ==
By the beginning of the 14th century, the village of Chetvertynivka consisted of three parts: old Chetvertynivka, Slobodo Chetvertynivka, and the village of Batih, which lay on the bank of the Southern Bug. In the middle of the 14th century, the area became part of Lithuania, and after the Union of Lublin in 1569, it became part of Poland, after which the lands were transferred to the princes of Chetvertynivka. In those years, residents of the villages of Strutova (now Velyka Stratiivka) and Mytkivka moved to the village. Each village had churches with separate parishes. And in 1638, Prince Chetvertynskyi gave these lands to the nobleman Sobanskyi.

Near the village, under the Batih Mountain, on 1 June 1652 was the Battle of Batoh, where an alliance of the Zaporizhian Sich and Crimean Khanate under leadership of Bogdan Khmelnytsky fought against the army of the Polish-Lithuania Commonwealth under the command of Martyn Kalinovsky. The battle was considered one of the most important events in the Khmelnytsky Uprising, and ended with a victory for the Khanate alliance.

After victory at Mount Batih, the Cossacks set up a small camp to rest in the village. The stone is still there today and local folklore believes that the stone will give strength, courage, and health to people who stand on it.

The city became part of the Ledyzhyn povit in the 1820s when Michał Sobanski acquired the land from Seweryn Potocki.

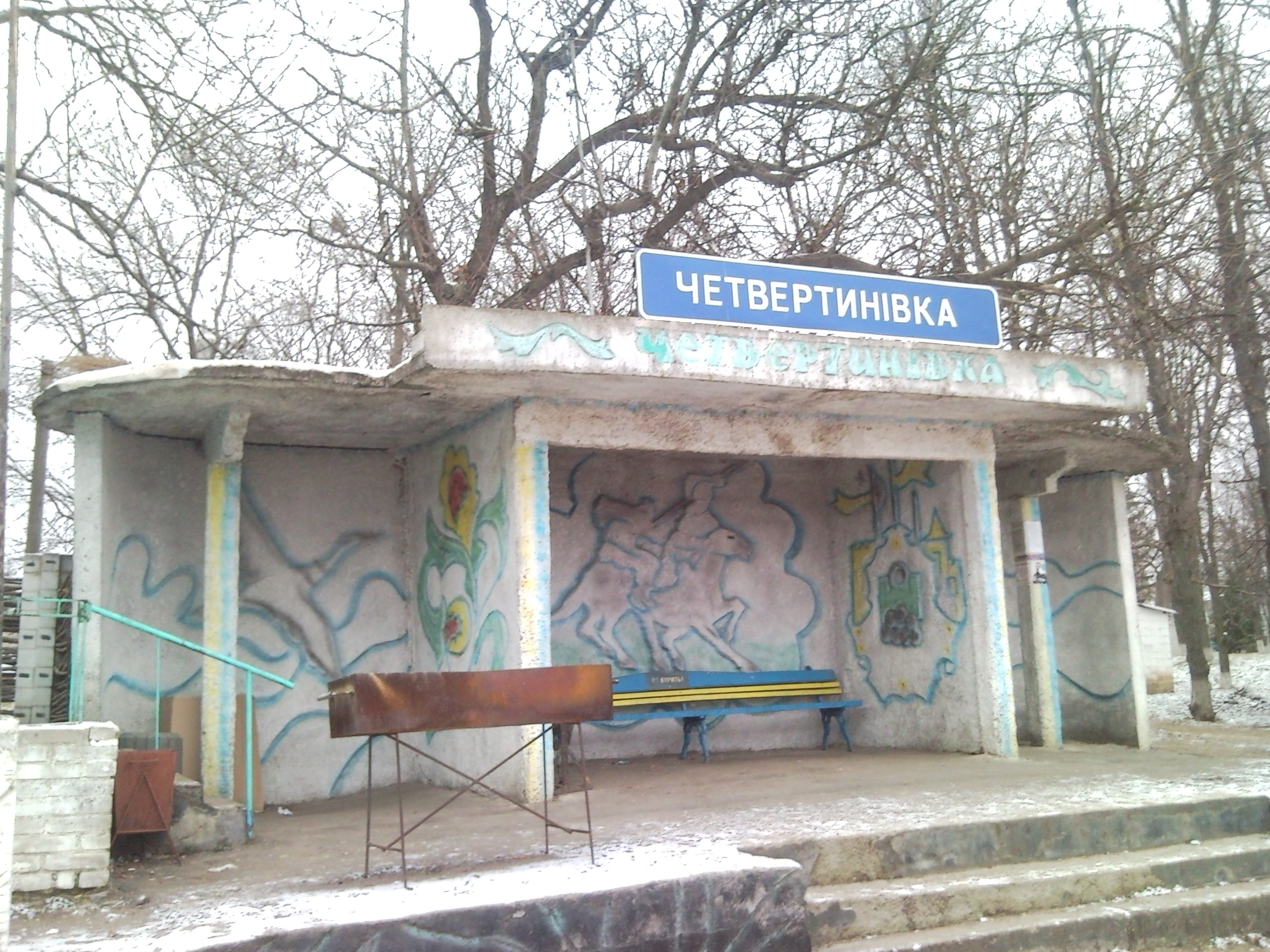
Bus stop

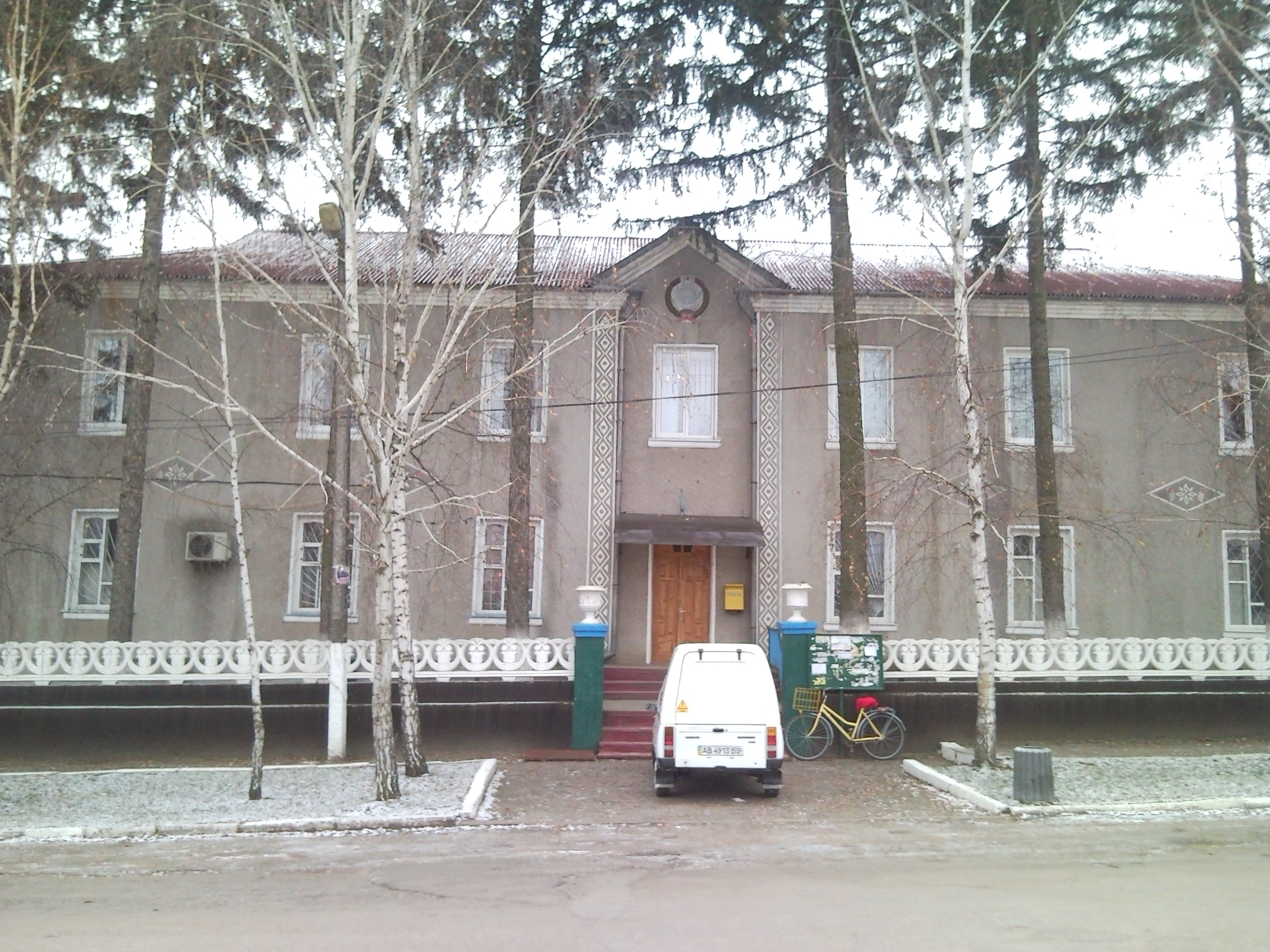
Post office
