= Siege of Memmingen =

1647 siege of the Thirty Years' War

- Part of the Thirty Years' War
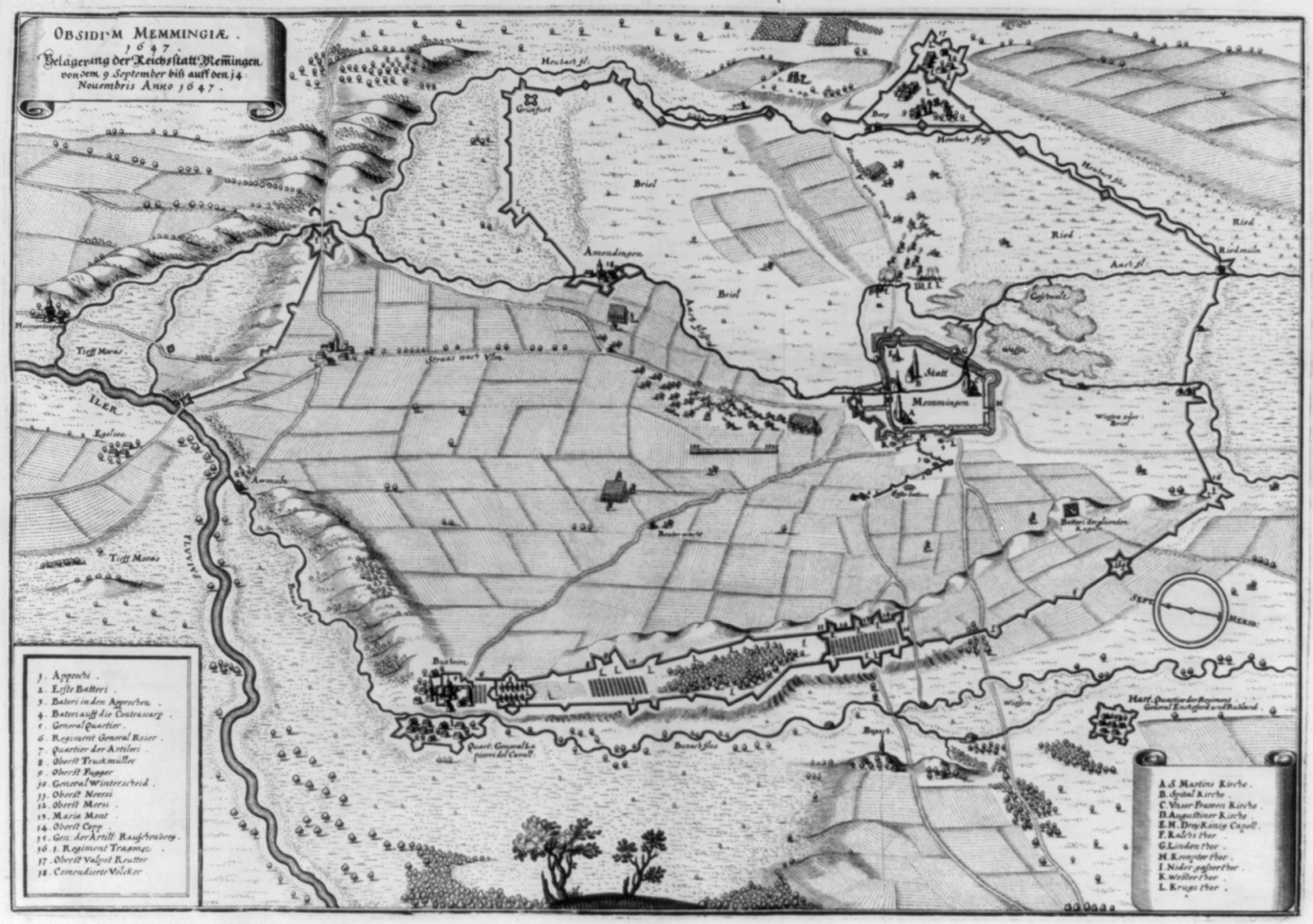
- The Siege of Memmingen in 1647.
| Date | September 9 to November 23, 1647 (Note: Nine Weeks or Two Months) |
| Location | Free Imperial City of Memmingen (Present-day Germany) |
| Result | Bavarian victory |
| Territorial changes | Bavarian recapture Memmingen |

Belligerents
| (yes) Swedish Empire | Bavaria; Holy Roman Empire |

Commanders and leaders
| (Swedish Empire) Zygmunt Przyjemski | (Holy Roman Empire) Adrian von Enkevort (Electorate of Bavaria) Johann von Winterscheidt (Electorate of Bavaria) Johann Heinrich de Lapier (Electorate of Bavaria) Franz Rouyer |

Units involved
| Memmingen Garrison | Winterscheid Regiment; Enkevort Regiment |

Strength
| c. 350 | c. 4,000–6,000; Four 18-pounder cannons Eight 24-pounder cannons Four culverins Two Halbe Kartaunen; Four fire-mortars |

Casualties and losses
| 350 surrendered | Unknown |

The siege of Memmingen was conducted by Bavarian troops under the command of Adrian von Enkevort. Following the siege, the city was garrisoned by Johann von Winterscheidt's regiment. The siege would last nine weeks and the Swedish Garrison was allowed an honorable surrender.

== Background ==
In October 1646, a Franco-Swedish army invaded Bavaria, after having ravaged Westphalia and outmaneuvering Archduke Leopold Wilhelm. Generals Wrangel and Turenne quickly overran much of Bavaria. News of Leopold Wilhelm made the allies fall back into Swabia and went into winter quarters around Lake Constance. During winter Wrangel captured Bregenz, Mainau, and several other towns on Lake Constance. This campaign forced Maximilian of Bavaria to sign the Truce of Ulm.

By the Truce of Ulm, Memmingen was placed under Swedish control. It would subsequently become a Swedish base of operations in Swabia. Maximilian broke the truce due to Imperial concessions in the Treaty of Pilsen and a minor Imperial victory by the Graf von Holzappel at Triebl. After the peace concluded, Adrian von Enkevort began his campaign by moving to Memmingen with around 4,000-6,000, avoiding the French garrisons. Memmingen was defended by about 350 men under the Polish commander Zygmunt Przyjemski.

== Siege ==
On September 27, the Bavarian Army arrived at Memmingen and got to work on digging trenches and establishing two gun batteries. Two batteries were placed under the command of Johann von Winterscheidt.

According to the diary of Peter Hagendorf, the batteries consisted of, "Which was equipped with two 18-pounder cannons, four 24-pounder cannons, and two culverins; Colonel Rugir commanded the small battery, which held an equal number of guns; and two Halbe Kartaunen were positioned on the hill on the other side". During the siege the garrison launched several sorties, one of them on October 5, where the Swedes spiked 5 cannons. (Note: From the diary of Peter Hagendorf)

Several other sorties occurred but they were driven back. The Bavarians launched several assaults on the town's fortifications, specifically the Krug and Wester Gates, but achieved little. On November 23, the garrison negotiated a surrender of the garrison of 350 men and left the city on the 24th. (Note: From the diary of Peter Hagendorf) Przjemski surrendered to Generals Enkevort, Winterscheidt, Lapier, and Rouyer. The garrison was escorted by the Bavarians as far as Erfurt.

== Aftermath ==
Following the siege, Enkevort moved throughout Swabia and Franconia, capturing several other towns in those areas. He continued his operations by making a gunboat flotilla to contest Swedish control of Lake Constance.

Cannon and mortar fire destroyed the Lindau Gate and several residential buildings, while also damaging many roofs. Winterscheidt's regiment would garrison the city, with Johann von Winterscheidt being given command of the city.

== See also ==
- Bavarian campaign (1646–1647)
- Adrian von Enkevort
- Memmingen
- Zygmunt Przyjemski

== Sources ==
- Essen, Michael (2020). The Lion from the North: Volume 2, The Swedish Army during the Thirty Years War 1632-48. Helion & Company. pp. 137–138. ISBN 978-1913118839.
- Helfferich, Tryntje (2009). The Thirty Years War: A Documentary History. Indianapolis: Hackett. ISBN 9780872209404.
- Höfer, Ernst (1997). Das Ende des Dreißigjährigen Krieges. Strategie und Kriegsbild. ISBN 3-412-04297-8.
- Wilson, Peter H. (2011) [2009]. Europe's Tragedy: A History of the Thirty Years War. Harvard University Press. ISBN 9780674062313.
- Zanker, Anton (2019). Der Schwedenkrieg. In Memmingen und Umgebung (The Swedish War in Memmingen and Surrounding Areas). BoD (Books on Demand), Norderstedt. ISBN 978-3-7322-8137-4.
