= Ladyzhyn urban hromada =

Ladyzhyn urban hromada Ладижинська міська громада
- Hromada
- Seal
- Interactive map of Ladyzhyn urban hromada
- Country: Ukraine
- Oblast: Vinnytsia
- Raion: Haisyn

Area
  - Total: 124.5 km^{2} (48.1 sq mi)

Population (2022)
  - Total: 24,594
  - Density: 197.5/km^{2} (511.6/sq mi)
- Website: ladrada.gov.ua

Ladyzhyn urban hromada is a territorial hromada (municipality) in the Vinnytsia region of Ukraine. It encompasses the city of Ladyzhyn as well as the villages of Vasylivka, Hubnyk, Zaozerne, Lukashivka and Ruzhytske. The hromada covers an area of 124,5 square kilometres. Its population is 24,594 (2022 estimate). The hromada was created on 12 June 2020 with the merger of Ladyzhyn city council and Zaozerne village council.
