= Zygmunt Przyjemski =

Polish military commander

Zygmunt Przyjemski of Rawicz (died 3 June 1652) was a Polish military commander and a member of the administration of the Polish–Lithuanian Commonwealth.

In his youth he served in the French and Swedish armies during the Thirty Years' War. He commanded the Swedish garrison at the Siege of Memmingen. A general of artillery and, at the same time, the Field Writer of the Crown, he was taken captive by the Cossacks in the Battle of Batoh, in which he commanded the Polish infantry. He was executed soon afterwards with a few thousands other Polish prisoners taken in that battle.

== Bibliography ==
- Kazimierz Lepszy (red.): Słownik biograficzny historii powszechnej do XVII stulecia. Warszawa: Wiedza Powszechna, 1968.
