= Battle of Bila Tserkva (1651) =

1651 battle of the Khmelnytsky Uprising

- Part of the Khmelnytsky Uprising
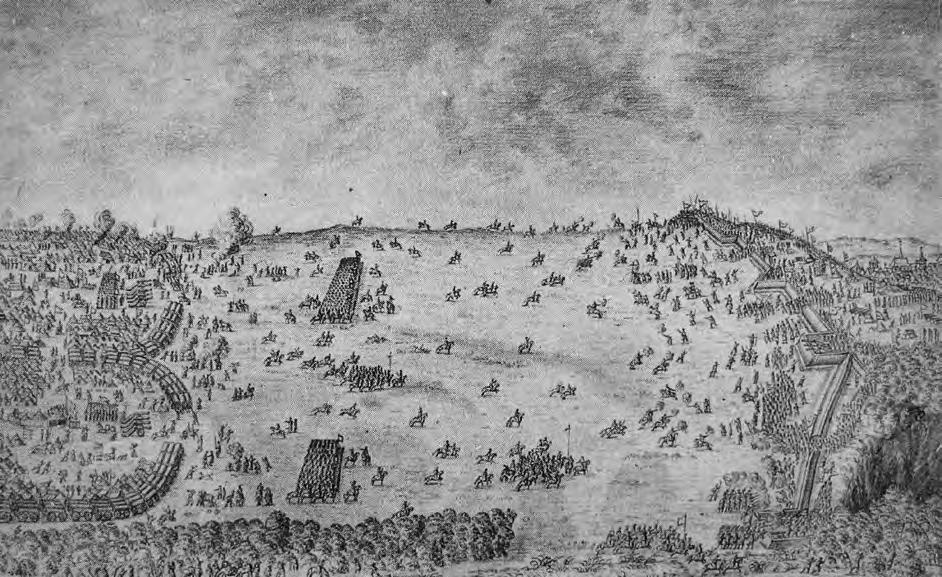
- The Battle of Bila Tserkva (1651) on the Polish–Lithuanian painting by Abraham van Westerveld in the XVII century
Date	23–25 September 1651
Location	Bila Tserkva, Bila Tserkva Regiment, Cossack Hetmanate
Result	Inconclusive; Treaty of Bila Tserkva
Territorial changes	Limitation of the Cossack state to the Kiev Voivodeship.

Belligerents
Polish–Lithuanian Commonwealth	Cossack Hetmanate; Crimean Khanate

Commanders and leaders
Janusz Radziwiłł; Marcin Kalinowski; Mikołaj Potocki; Stanisław Potocki; Zygmunt Przyjemski; Stefan Czarniecki	Bohdan Khmelnytsky; İslâm III Giray

Strength
22,000 Polish–Lithuanian hussars, cavalry and infantry	25,000 Zaporozhian Cossacks; 6,000 Crimean Tatars

Casualties and losses
Unknown	Unknown

The Battle of Bila Tserkva (Ukrainian: Битва під Білою Церквою, Polish: Bitwa pod Białą Cerkwią: 23–25 September 1651) was fought between the Polish–Lithuanian Commonwealth against the Cossack Hetmanate and Crimean Khanate as a part of the Khmelnytsky Uprising. Near the site of the present-day city of Bila Tserkva in Ukraine.

== Background ==
Following the Battle of Berestechko from 28 June to 10 July 1651, under orders from the departing Polish King John II Casimir, the Polish forces under the command of Hetmans Marcin Kalinowski and Mikołaj Potocki advanced into the Cossack Hetmanate, reaching Lyubar on 4 August 1651 and at the same time the Lithuanian forces under the command of Prince Janusz Radziwiłł entered Kyiv. The Polish forces under the command of Hetmans Marcin Kalinowski and Mikołaj Potocki soon encountered the Zaporozhian Cossack's positions near the city of Bila Tserkva and the Zaporozhian Cossacks under the command of Hetman Bohdan Khmelnytsky main camp to the east, preventing the Polish and Lithuanian forces from the military uniting. The death of Prince Jeremi Wisniowiecki, who constantly insisted on the most energetic and ruthless tactics possible against the Zaporozhian Cossacks, delayed movement of the Crown Army until 23 August 1651, when it moved to the village of Trylisy, capturing the garrison of the Zaporozhian Cossacks numbered around 600 men in the next day. On 3 September 1651, Prince Janusz Radziwiłł agreed to merge his Lithuanian forces with the Polish forces near the city of Vasylkiv and took up a position with it near the village of Hermanivka on 13 September 1651, followed by the Polish–Lithuanian an entire camp being moved toward the city of Bila Tserkva on 16 September 1651. After the peace negotiations in the all month failed to progress, Hetmans Marcin Kalinowski and Mikołaj Potocki probably moved on 22 September 1651 in a defensive formation from the village of Hermanivka to the city of Bila Tserkva, the Polish forces at the centre and right flank and the Lithuanian forces on the left.

== Battle ==
According to Hetman Mikołaj Potocki, who was commanding from the centre with Nobleman Zygmunt Przyjemski: On Saturday on 23 September 1651, I was approaching the city of Bila Tserkva. A good mile ahead, the Zaporozhian Cossack's and Crimean Tatar's cavalry came out to engage us and I moved against them in a formation similar to that at the Battle of Berestechko in 28 June — 10 July 1651, adhering to the information given by His Royal Majesty and attacked the enemy in a broad line. I committed the right flank to Prince Janusz Radziwiłł and the left flank to Hetman Marcin Kalinowski, together with Hetman Stanisław Potocki. He ordered the vanguard regiment into battle and drove the enemy right into their camp, littering the field abundantly with the Zaporozhian Cossack's and Crimean Tatar's military corpses." On Sunday in 24 September 1651, the Zaporozhian Cossacks were building a rampart near a dike and Stanisław Potocki ordered our the Polish–Lithuanian Commonwealth’s forces to go into the field, our light cavalry skirmishers fought against the Zaporozhian Cossacks and Crimean Tatars who’s withdrew to the marshes". On Monday on 25 September 1651, according to Hetman Mikołaj Potocki, the Zaporozhian Cossacks moved into the field with the Crimean Tatars and so did our forces and did considerable harm to them and drove them back to their camp." On Tuesday on 26 September 1651, the rain was falling in torrential downpours, Hetman Bohdan Khmelnytsky sent the Zaporozhian Cossacks again and asking that no more blood be shed and it was decided to make a peace, according to Hetman Mikołaj Potocki.

== Aftermath ==
Hetman Mikołaj Potocki listed five reasons for seeking a peace including:

(1) In the German mercenary cavalry started a desertion and quarter-year term to fought together and with the Polish–Lithuanian Commonwealth's forces was ending.

(2) An epidemic of some sort had developed among the Polish–Lithuanian infantry partly because of hunger and bad weather, they began to die in large a numbers.

(3) Prince Janusz Radzwiłł could not help the Polish–Lithuanian Commonwealth's forces long and retreated to the Grand Duchy of Lithuania of the Polish–Lithuanian Commonwealth.

(4) The predictions of the arrival of the Crimean Tatars under the command of Khan İslâm III Giray.

(5) The hunger befell the Polish–Lithuanian Commonwealth's forces and their cavalry.

After the battle was signed the Treaty of Bila Tserkva on Friday on 28 September 1651.
