= Battle of Batih =

1652 battle of the Khmelnytsky Uprising

Coordinates: 48.5917°N 29.2822°E

- Part of the Khmelnytskyi Uprising
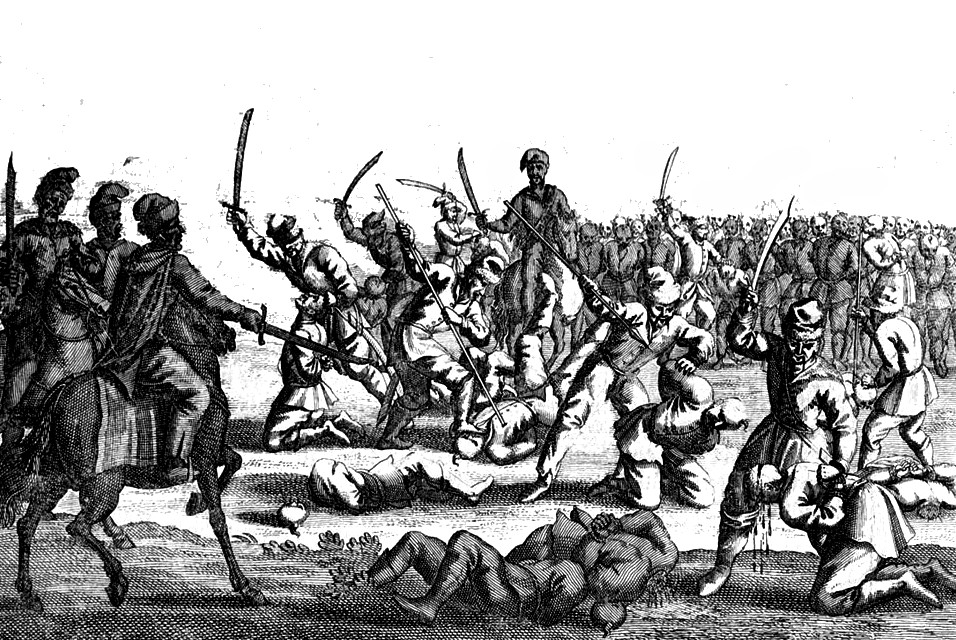
- Murdering of the Polish–Lithuanian prisoners after the battle. Painting by Hiob Ludolf in 1713
Date	1–2 June 1652
Location	Batih, Bratslav Regiment, Cossack Hetmanate
Result	Cossack–Tatar victory

Belligerents
Cossack Hetmanate; Crimean Khanate	Polish–Lithuanian Commonwealth

Commanders and leaders
Bohdan Khmelnytskyi; Tymofiy Khmelnytskyi; Ivan Zolotarenko; Ivan Bohun; Ivan Sirko	Marcin Kalinowski †; Zygmunt Przyjemski (POW) (executed); Marek Sobieski (POW) (executed); Marcin Czarniecki (POW) (executed); Samuel Kalinowski (POW) (executed)

Strength
12,000 Cossacks; 8,000–10,000 Tatars	13,500–20,000 Polish–Lithuanian cavalry and infantry

Casualties and losses
1,000 killed and wounded	10,000–15,000 killed and wounded

The Battle of Batih (Ukrainian: Битва під Батогом, Polish: Bitwa pod Batohem; 1–2 June 1652) was fought between the Cossack Hetmanate and Crimean Khanate against the Polish–Lithuanian Commonwealth as a part of the Khmelnytskyi Uprising. Near the village of Batih in the Bratslav Regiment, a force of Zaporozhian Cossacks and Crimean Tatars under the command of Bohdan Khmelnytsky, Tymofiy Khmelnytsky, Ivan Zolotarenko, Ivan Sirko and Ivan Bohun attacked and completely defeated the Polish–Lithuanian forces under the command of Marcin Kalinowski, Zygmunt Przyjemski, Marek Sobieski, Marcin Czarniecki and Samuel Kalinowski, all of them were killed in action or taken captive. After the battle, the captured Polish–Lithuanian troops were brutally slain and beheaded by the Zaporozhian Cossacks and Crimean Tatars, as a revenge for the Battle of Berestechko.

During the battle, the forces of Cossack Hetmanate and Crimean Khanate destroyed many and one of the best Polish–Lithuanian military units. Although the Polish–Lithuanian Commonwealth managed to rebuild their army soon after the battle, the losses of the most experienced troops resulted in its temporary weakness. Defeat of the Crown Army contributed to the wars to come with the Tsardom of Muscovy and Swedish Empire, which in turn resulted into the Deluge.

== Background ==
After the Treaty of Bila Tserkva was not ratified by the Polish Sejm the Polish–Lithuanian Commonwealth deployed Crown forces under the command of Field Hetman Marcin Kalinowski in the Bracław Voivodeship

According to the historian Hrushevsky, Hetman Bohdan Khmelnytsky claimed that the Poles had violated the Bila Tserkva peace agreement by razing a couple of Cossack towns and preparing for war. A great Cossack council held at Chyhyryn, which also included Tatar delegates, decided that the failure of the Sejm to ratify the treaty meant that the Cossacks were released from their oaths.

Kalinowski intended to use the Trans-Dnieper Crown army, which in April was ordered by John II Casimir Vasa to gather at Kalinowski's Bratslav camp, "to prevent the Cossack army's merger with the Horde" by blocking the Horde's march "into Moldavia to fight the Hospodar" Vasile Lupu. "Khmelnytsky sent his son", Tymofiy Khmelnytsky, "together with the Tatars to Moldavia, to take revenge militarily on that country's ruler for having sworn he would give his daughter in marriage to Khmelnytsky's son and then later refusing."

However, the Crown army had only "crossed the river to Kyiv" on 14 June on its way to Kalinowski's corps, the Cossack army was already mobilized and merged with the Horde by the end of May, and Kalinowski met them on his own. "The Polish hetman had chosen a flat plain near the Boh and Sob, one so large that the small Polish army could not maintain control of it...he insisted that there had to be room for the troops that were coming to join him: for the Trans-Dnipro Poles, a detachment of the palatine of Bratslav, Stanislaw Lanckoronski, and others that in the end did not manage to join him." "Khmelnytsky, who had a horde of substantial size at his disposal this time, hurried to attack him before the Polish troops from across the Dnipro and other contingents arrived."

== Battle ==
"When the relatively small Tatar vanguard regiment appeared, the Polish cavalry attacked, beginning a battle that lasted through the first day (1 June). During the battle, "Khmelnytsky's main forces arrived, and during the night they bypassed the Polish camp in such a way that the Poles did not notice."

On the second day, the cavalry skirmishes resumed but soon Kalinowski "saw himself surrounded by Cossack and Tatar forces on all sides." "The Cossacks broke through the endless line-more than a mile long-around the camp and entered into its midst." "When its predicament became clear, the Crown Army was swept by panic, insubordination, and mutiny." "Some fifteen hundred of them fled", "some perished and others fell into the hands of the Cossacks and Tatars, Kalinowski himself was killed."

=== Massacre ===
After the battle, the Zaporozhian Cossacks paid the Crimean Tatars for possession of the prisoners, and promptly slaughtered the Polish captives to avenge Khmelnytsky’s defeat at Berestechko in June-July 1651. According to Hrushevsky and Pasicznyk, Duda and Sikora, the decision to execute the prisoners was taken by Bohdan Khmelnytsky himself. Khmelnytsky, commanding the unit of Zaporozhian Cossacks, offered Nuradyn Sultan 50,000 thalers for the right to execute the 10,000–15,000 Polish captives in revenge for Berestechko. He also promised him the town of Kamieniec for their transfer under his command. Estimated 3,000–5,000 to 8,000 Polish soldiers were massacred.

== Aftermath ==
"The situation that existed after Korsuń and Pyliavtsi ... now arose once more" with the Polish forces "shattered, Poland defenseless and panic-stricken". (in 1648 after the first Polish defeats at the start of the rebellion)

A number of notable Polish nobles fell in the battle or the following massacre of prisoners, including Crown Great Quartermaster Samuel Kalinowski, the son of Hetman Marcin Kalinowski, Hetman Kalinowski himself, General of the Artillery Zygmunt Przyjemski, Castelan of Czernihów Jan Odrzywolski, rotmistrz Marcin Czarniecki (brother of Stefan Czarniecki) and magnate Marek Sobieski, brother of later King Jan III Sobieski.
