= Ladyzhyn =

City in Vinnytsia Oblast, Ukraine

Ladyzhyn Ладижин
- City
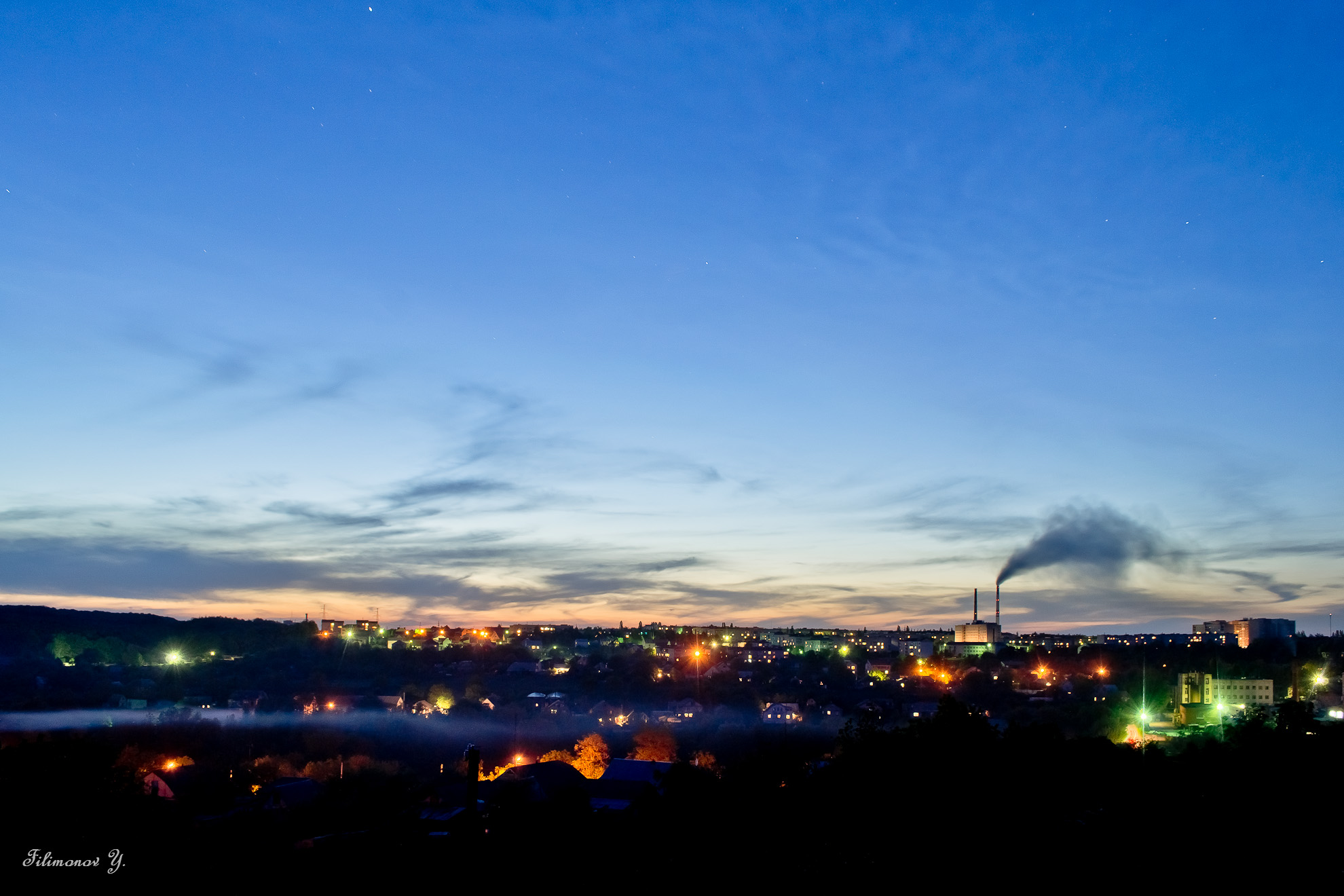
- Skyline of Ladyzhyn

- Flag Coat of arms

- Location within Vinnytsia Oblast Location within Ukraine
- Coordinates: 48°40′N 29°15′E
- Country: Ukraine
- Oblast: Vinnytsia Oblast
- Raion: Haisyn Raion
- Hromada: Ladyzhyn urban hromada
- First mentioned: 1260

Area
  - Total: 9 km^{2} (3.5 sq mi)

Population (2022)
  - Total: 22,459
  - Density: 2,500/km^{2} (6,500/sq mi)
- Postal code: 24320-24323
- Area code: +380-4343
- Website: https://ladrada.gov.ua/

Ladyzhyn (Ukrainian: Ладижин, IPA: [lɐˈdɪʒɪn]; Polish: Ładyżyn) is a city in Vinnytsia Oblast, Ukraine. It is located on the Southern Bug at the confluence of the Silnytsia River. Its population was 22,459 (2022 estimate).

== History ==
Historical affiliations

Grand Duchy of Lithuania 1459–1569
Polish–Lithuanian Commonwealth 1569–1672
Ottoman Empire 1672–1699
Polish–Lithuanian Commonwealth 1699–1793
Russian Empire 1793–1917
Ukraine Ukrainian People's Republic and Ukrainian State 1917–1920
Soviet Ukraine 1920–1922
Soviet Union 1922–1941
Kingdom of Romania 1941–1944
Soviet Union 1944–1991
Ukraine 1991–present

=== Early history ===
The land Ladyzhyn is located on has been inhabited for at least 1,700 years. Excavations in the nearby villages of Kharpachka and Kysliak have revealed gold coins dated to the 3rd Century during the reign of Roman emperor Severus Alexander.

In the 10th century, Prince Vladimir the Great built fortresses in Ladyzhyn along the river to protect his possessions from the nomadic peoples, such as the Khazars, Pechenegs, and Polovtsians. The 13th-century prince Daniel of Galicia built more fortifications upon the rivers in the region.

The Grand Duchy of Lithuania expanded its territory in the 14th century by annexing principalities in Ukraine, opposed to the Tatars' subjugation of the area. In 1363, the Grand Duke of Lithuania Algirdas, supported by Polish and Ruthenian troops, defeated the Tatar horde, and the cities of Ladyzhyn and Bratslav were burned.

In the 16th century, Ladyzhyn was a wooden fortress city of the Bratslav Voivodeship, surrounded by a thirty-meter dirt rampart. The remains of the rampart are still preserved in the city center.

The Batih massacre happened near Ladyzhyn in 1652.

In 1670, Ladyzhyn was under control of Hetman Petro Doroshenko, whose administration was not kind to Poles. In response, Jan Sobieski sent an army in 1671 and occupied the city. In 1672, Petro Doroshenko, supported by Turkish troops, recaptured the city, but in 1673, Left-Bank Hetman Ivan Samoylovych took the city from him, and left 5,000 Cossacks to guard the fortress. Doroshenko again asked Turks to help him recapture the city, and Sultan Mehmed IV sent a detachment with his son Oslam Giray. Colonel Murashko defeated the Turks and captured Oslam, and executed his troops.

Four years later, Mehmed re-entered the city with an army of 70,000 troops to avenge his son's death. Over the course of two weeks, Murashko fended off 11 attacks, but was wounded and taken prisoner. By sultan's order, the residents of Ladyzhyn were slaughtered, and the city was razed.

=== Russian Empire ===
With the growing immigration to Podolia, which began in the early eighteenth century, the settlement of Ladyzhyn, stretching across the Silnytsia River, began. By 1775, the village had 98 households. Up until 1830, the village was owned by Alexander Sabanskyi, and then it was transferred to military control. In 1844, the village was declared a city.

By the end of the 19th century, Ladyzhyn would eventually lose its significance to the military, but economic growth occurred when multiple factories were opened, including five textile factories, three brick factories, a tannery, and a tiling factory. Following the economic success of the factories, a bank, a post office, a telegraph office, a magistrate's chamber, and four inns were opened. A ferry was also established to carry people across the Southern Bug, along with a 50-bed hospital and a pharmacy.

In 1859, a parochial school was opened, which would be changed into a ministerial school. In 1876, a distillery was opened in the city. In 1897, a school for girls was opened.

The distillery was closed in 1899 following the death of its Jewish owner, Volko Skliarevskyi, and was rented out to various businesses and governments until it was destroyed, being rebuilt in 1926 by the Soviet government.

=== Civil war and USSR ===
In May 1919, the city was liberated from Soviet rule by the troops of Ataman Ananii Volynets. A Ukrainian administration was established in the city. After the defeat of the Ukrainian troops, Soviet rule was established in July 1919, marking an end to the Ukrainian People's Republic's control.

From 1923 to 1931, the city was the administrative center of the Ladyzhyn Raion. Over the next two years, at least 20 people in the city died during the Holodomor.

Ladyzhyn was occupied by Nazi troops during the Second World War, and the city wear almost entirely destroyed. The troops of the 2nd Ukrainian Front liberated the city in 1944.

In 1954, the Zhdanov and Lenin collective farms in the city were merged to form the Rossiya collective. In Spring of 1968, construction began on one of the largest power plants in the country at the time. The Ladyzhyn TPP was finally established in 1970, the same year that a concrete plant was opened in the town.

By a decree of the Presidium of the Supreme Soviet of the Ukrainian SSR of March 21, 1973, Ladyzhyn, in the Trostianets Raion, was classified as a city under district authority.

=== Post-Soviet era ===
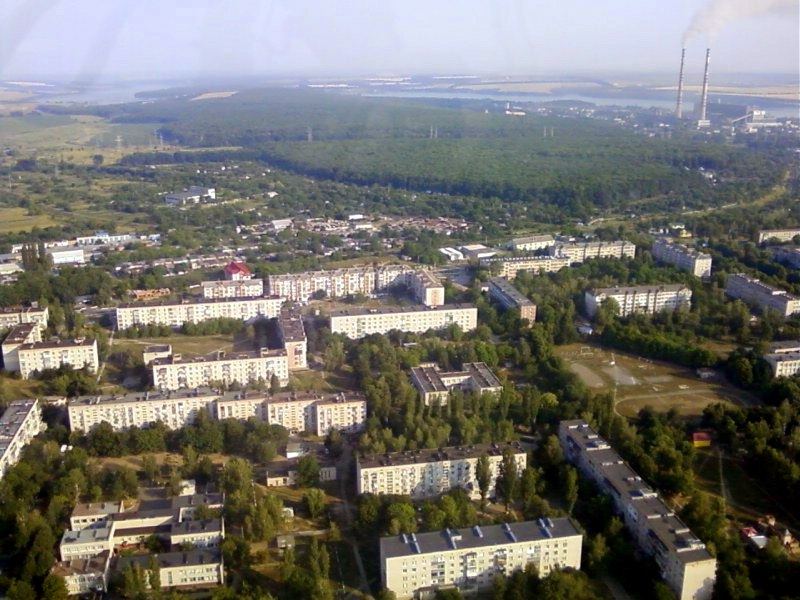
Aerial photo of Ladyzhyn

In 2000, Ladyzhyn was declared a city of regional significance.

In 2010, Myronivsky Hliboproduct started construction of the Vinnytsia Broiler poultry farm with a capacity of 400,000 tons of chicken per year and the Ladyzhyn feed mill with a total cost of $750 million, which was scheduled to be completed in 2013–2014. Ladyzhyn was chosen because of the significant amount of agricultural land MHP leases in the area and its proximity to the Ladyzhyn TTP plant, which provides sufficient power for such a project.

In modern times, the city is home to attractions such as the Korostovets Nature Reserve, Zelenoklyniv Rapids, and Ladyzhyn Grove,

== Jewish community ==
Bohdan Khmelnytsky and Colonel Ivan Hanzha invaded the city during the Khmelnytsky Uprising of 1648. The Cossack troops occupied the area, and massacred the Polish population. The Cossacks then rounded up the Jews, tied them up, and demanded that they convert to Orthodoxy. Those who refused were killed in mass shootings.

== Transportation ==
A bus service regularly carries passengers to the Oblast capital, Vinnytsia, and to other nearby villages and towns. There are also regular bus routes to Kyiv and Odesa.

Ladyzhyn is also home to a railway station on the Vapniarka Ziatkivtsi Khrystynivka line. The station has passenger trains that travel to Lviv and Cherkasy, as well as to the Vapniarka Khrystynivka Uman line. There are also trains travelling to Chernivtsi, Uzhhorod, Kryvyi Rih, Zaporizhzhia, Izmail, and Kovel.

== Religion ==
In 1904, a brick Byzantine-style Orthodox church with a dome and bell tower was built using church funds. It was consecrated on 4 November 1909 in honor of the icon of Our Lady of Kazan.

On April 24, 1998, on the feast of the Life-giving Spring Icon, the construction of the church in honor of St. George the Victorious began.

In 1999, in honor of the Annunciation of the Mother, a chapel was consecrated on August 28, a part of the Ukrainian Orthodox Church in the town. In 2011, the Catholic community resumed its activities and returned the Church of the Assumption of the Blessed Virgin Mary (Ladyzhyn) to the town. In addition to churches, there are also communities of Adventists, Baptists, Evangelicals, and other minor denominations of Christianity in Ladyzhyn.

In modern times, although the town once had a large population of Jews, is now nearly entirely Eastern Orthodox with a minority of Catholics.

== Notable people ==
- Aleksandr Rozenberg (born 1967), Prime Minister of Transnistria since 2022.

== Gallery ==
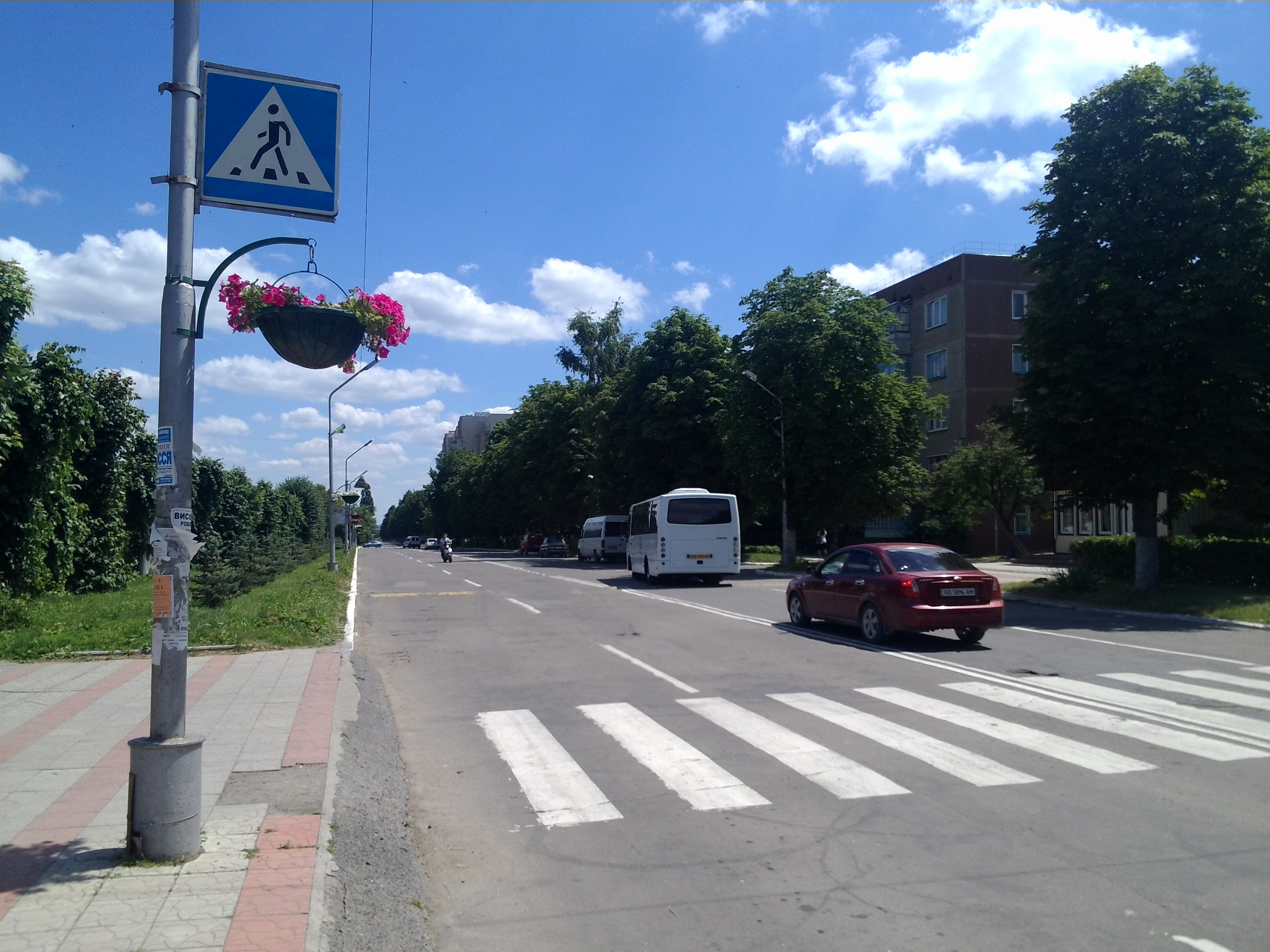
Main street of Ladyzhyn

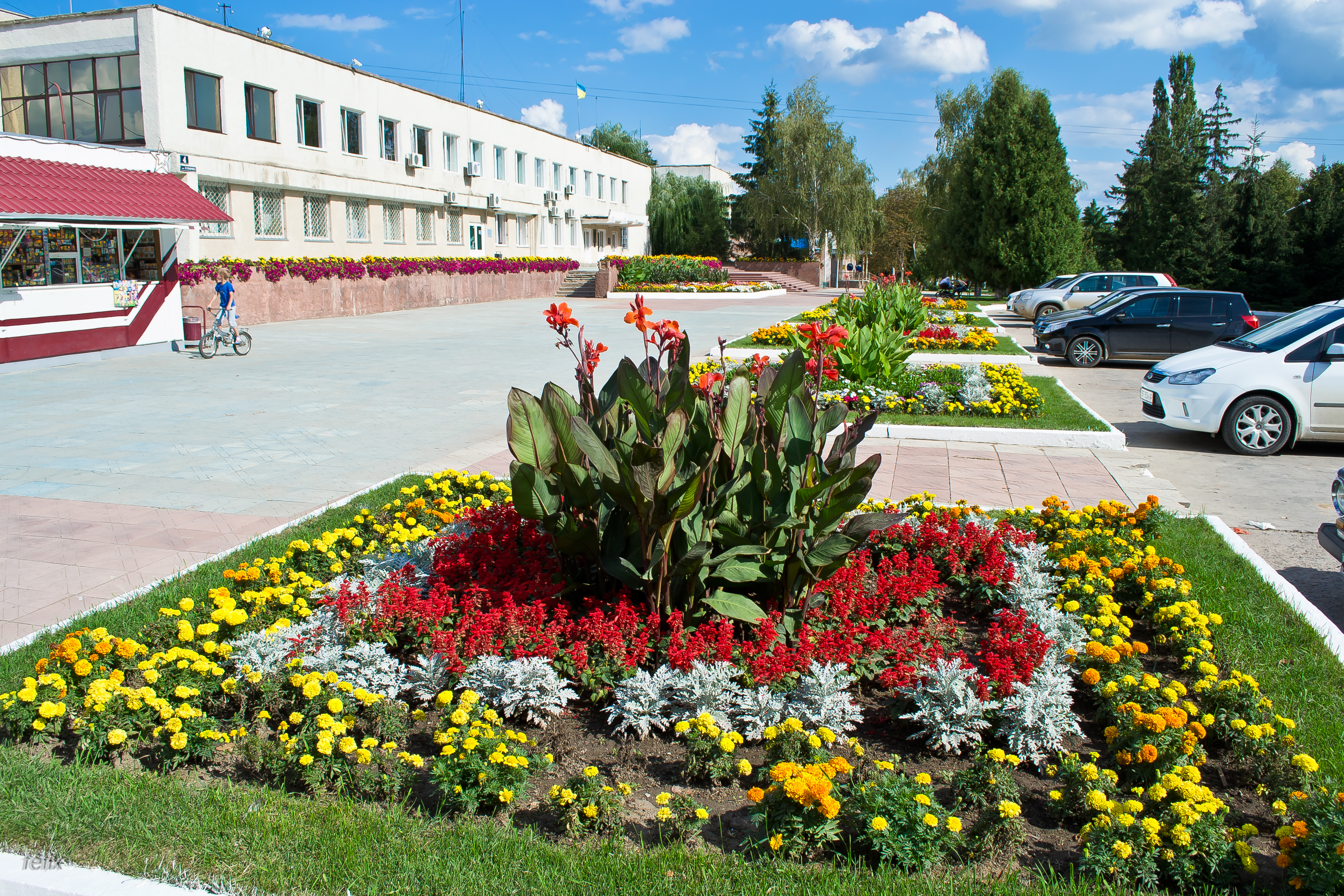
City hall

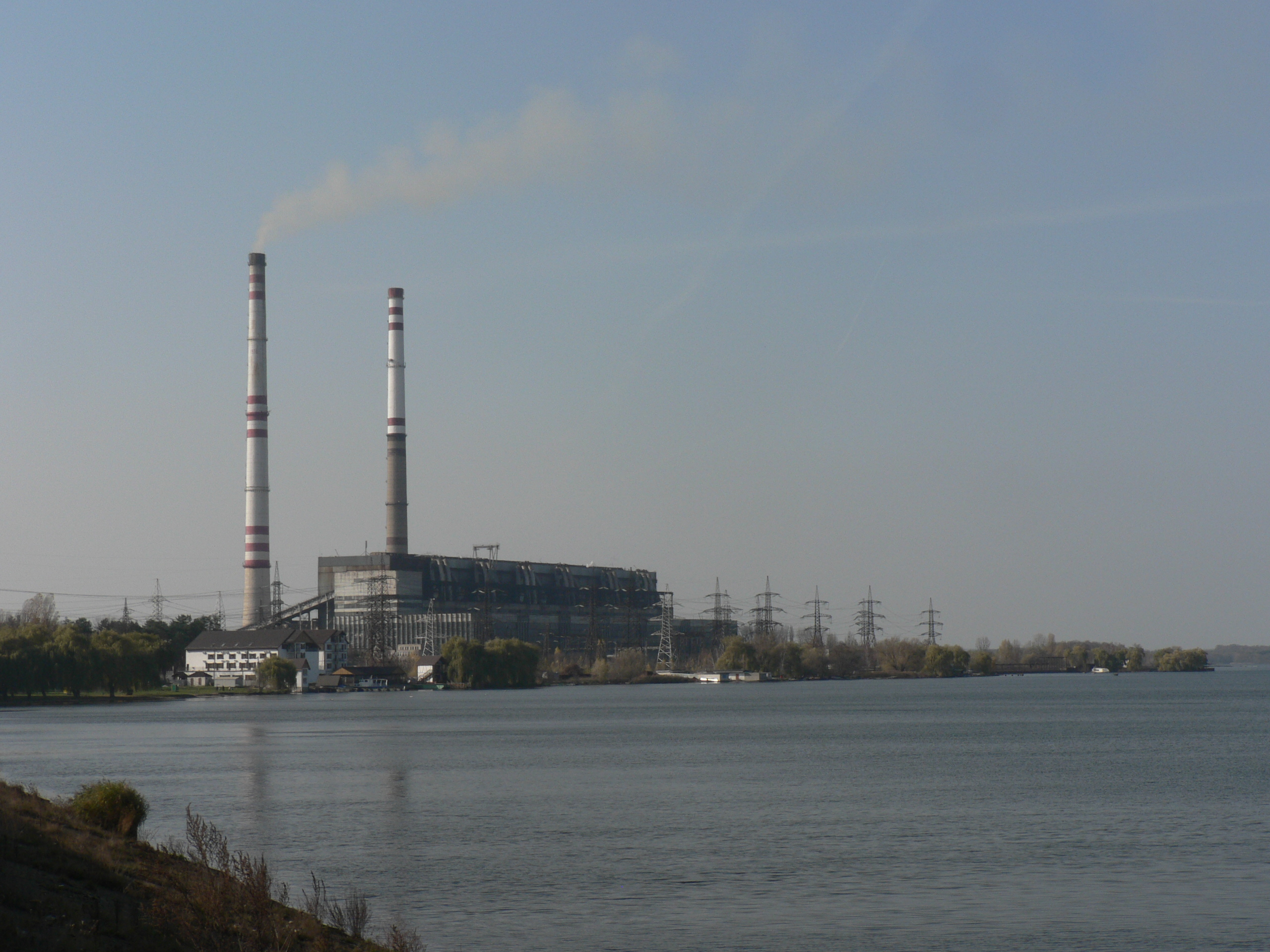
Ladyzhyn power plant

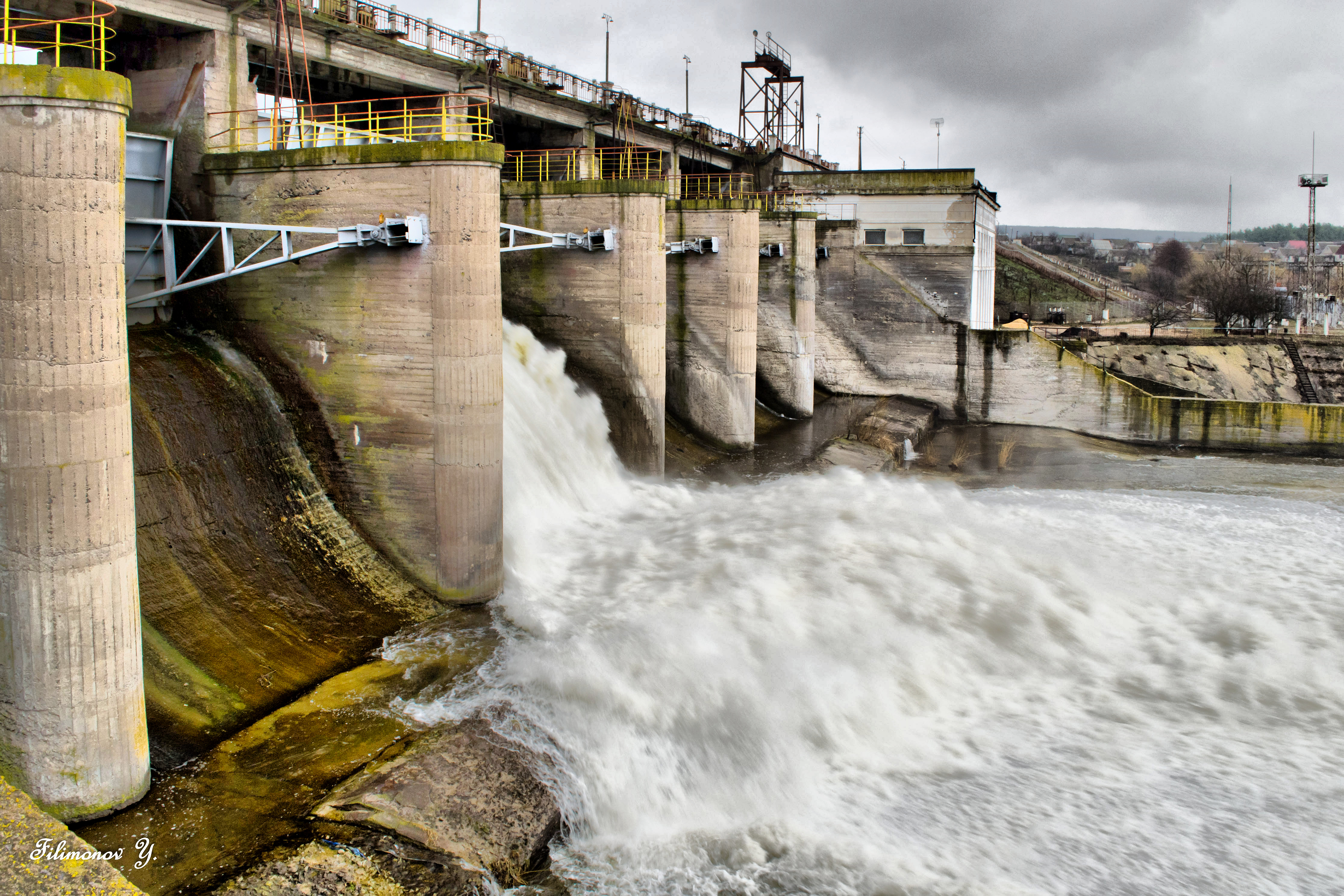
Dam on the Southern Bug
