= Naval war on Lake Constance =

Series of conflicts during the Thirty Years' War

Coordinates: 47.593710°N 9.424906°E

The Naval war on Lake Constance
- Part of the Thirty Years' War
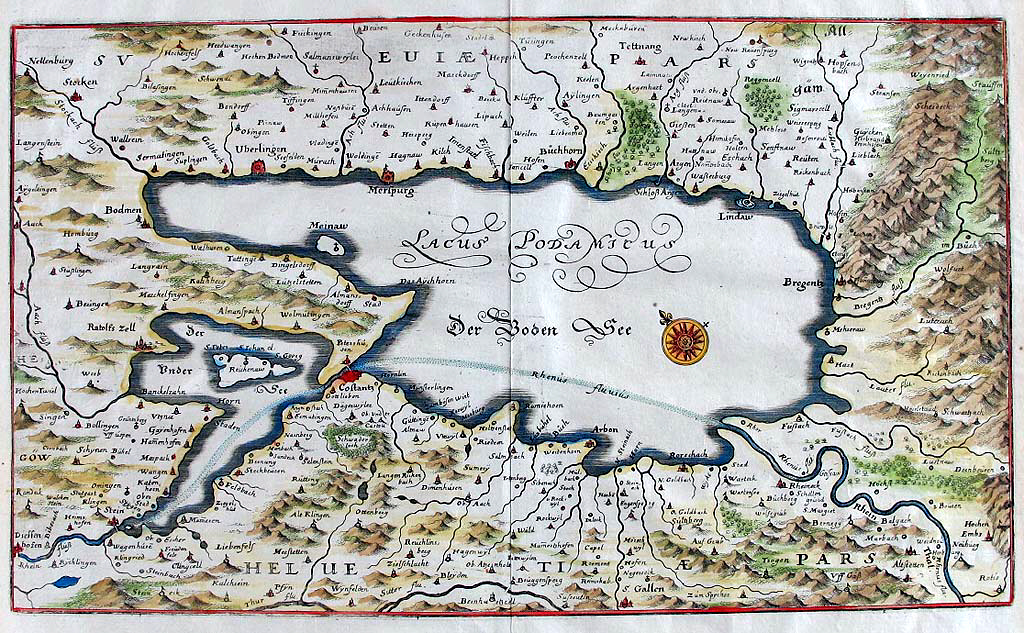
- A map of Lake Constance
Date	1632–1648
Location	Lake Constance
Result	Inconclusive

Belligerents
(Holy Roman Empire) Imperials (Electorate of Bavaria) Bavaria	Swedish Empire (Kingdom of France) France; Wurttemberg

Commanders and leaders
Unknown	Unknown

Units involved
Unknown	Unknown

The naval war on Lake Constance (German: Seekrieg auf dem Bodensee) was a series of conflicts that took place on Lake Constance, beginning in 1632, in the context of the Thirty Years' War (1618 to 1648). At that time various powers ruled different parts of the shoreline: in the north and east was Roman Catholic, Habsburg Anterior Austria; in the northwest and west the troops of the Protestant Duchy of Württemberg with their allies from Kingdom of Sweden and Kingdom of France. These various powers sought, for strategic reasons, to exercise their hegemony over the area of Lake Constance. Only the partly Catholic and partly Protestant southern shore which belonged to the Old Swiss Confederacy maintained an uneasy neutrality due to their divided loyalties.

The changing course of this post-war period of the Thirty Years' War brought no clear success to either party. The Protestant side (reinforced by France) could not seriously threaten imperial possessions; the Imperialists succeeded in maintaining their positions on the whole and to inflict telling losses on their enemy. Swedish/Württemberg naval domination in the last two years of the war had no wide-reaching significance by that stage.

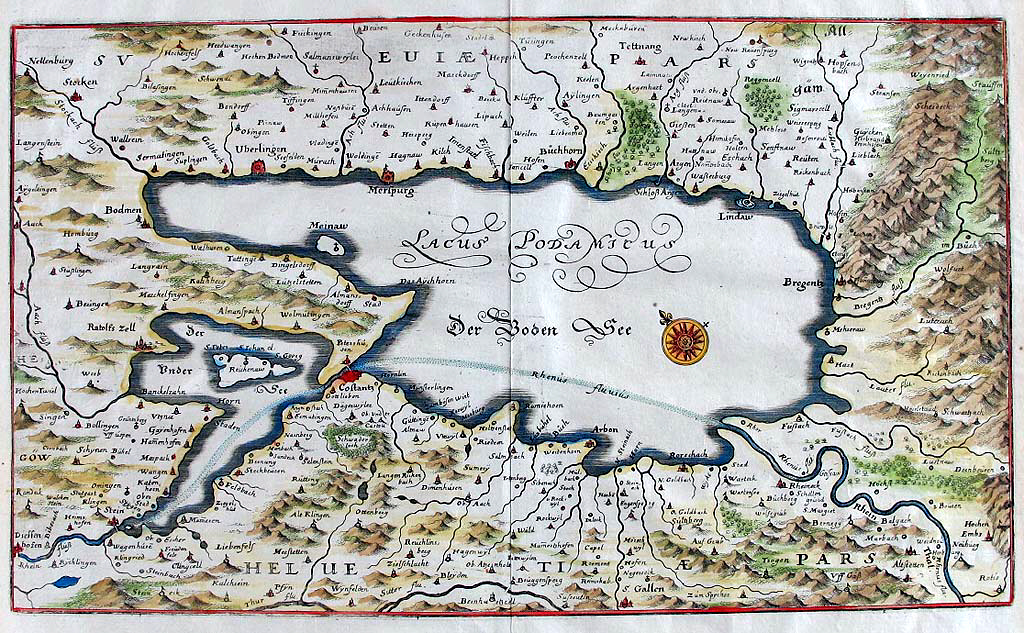
Lacus Podamicus. Der Boden See. Coloured copperplate, c. 1640

== Literature ==
- Carmen Galenschovski: Bodensee. 8th edn. Baedeker/Mairs Geographischer Verlag, Ostfildern 2005, ISBN 3-8297-1055-0; Kapitel Vom Dreißigjährigen Krieg zum Wiener Kongreß (1618–1815). pp. 36 ff. (extract from Google Books)
- Karl Gogg: Österreichs Kriegsmarine 1440–1848. Verlag Das Bergland-Buch, Salzburg et. 1972, ISBN 3-7023-0013-9, pp. 20 ff (for the whole chapter "Der Seekrieg").
- Heribert Küng: Vor 350 Jahren: Ende des dreißigjährigen Krieges in der Region Bodensee-Alpenrhein. In: Montfort. 50. Jg. 1998, 3rd issue, pp. 185 ff. (digitalised)
- Johann Sporschil: Der Dreissigjährige Krieg. G. Westermann, Brunswick, 1843, pp. 684 ff. (digitalised)
- Eberhard Fritz: Konrad Widerholt, Kommandant der Festung Hohentwiel (1634-1650). Ein Kriegsunternehmer im europäischen Machtgefüge. In: Zeitschrift für Württembergische Landesgeschichte 76 (2017). pp. 217–268.
