= Batih massacre =

1652 mass execution of Polish captives

Massacre of Poles at Batih in 1652
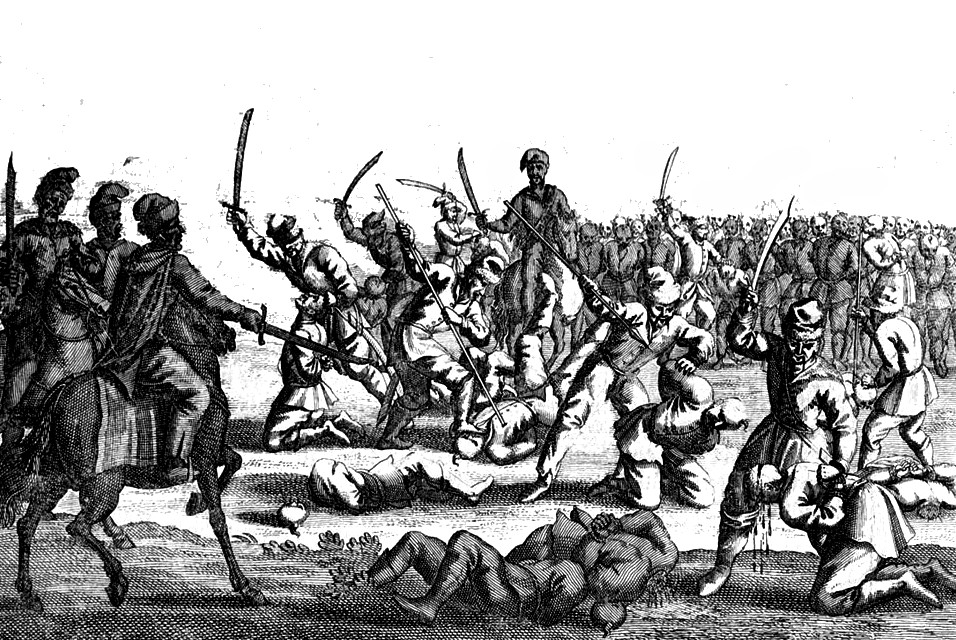
- The massacre of Polish captives by the Cossacks after the battle of Batoh (Batih) in 1652
- Date: 3–4 June 1652
- Location: Batih Hill near Ladyzhyn (today Ukraine)
- Cause: Two days of beheadings and disembowelments.
- Deaths: 3,000–8,000

The Batoh (Batih) massacre (Polish: Rzeź polskich jeńców pod Batohem) was a mass execution of Polish captives after the Battle of Batih on 3–4 June 1652 near Ladyzhyn (now in Ukraine). It was carried out by Ukrainian Cossacks under the command of Hetman Bohdan Khmelnytsky.

Initially the captured Polish soldiers belonged to the Cossacks' allies, the Crimean Tatars. After the battle, the Cossacks paid the Tatars for possession of the prisoners, and promptly slaughtered the Polish captives to avenge Khmelnytsky's defeat at Berestechko in June 1651. According to Jasienica, it was the Cossack colonels Ivan Zolotaryenko and Ivan Vysochin who bought them from the Tatars. According to Widacka, Cossack's commander Khmelnytsky himself contributed 50,000 thalers for that purpose. According to Hrushevsky and Pasicznyk, Duda, and Sikora, the decision to execute the prisoners was made by Khmelnytsky himself. Afterward, between 3,000 and 5,000 and 8,000 Polish soldiers were tied up and massacred in two days of methodical beheadings and disembowelments. Zolotaryenko supervised the executions yelling "Revenge for Berestechko!", a reference to an earlier Cossack defeat at the hands of the Poles in the Battle of Berestechko.

The methodical executions were so barbaric that even the Crimean leaders were horrified, not to mention international observers such as German historian Hiob Ludolf (president of the Collegium Imperiale Historicum), who illustrated the murder in his nominal Allgemeine Schau-Bühne der Welt published in 1713 in Frankfurt am Main. Only a few Poles survived, hidden by Tatar supporters, including Krzysztof Grodzicki and probably Stefan Czarniecki (whether Czarniecki was one of the captured is unclear).

The crime committed against so many disarmed prisoners had severe and long-lasting consequences for the history of the Polish–Lithuanian Commonwealth and for Ukraine. In the short term, it led the Polish-Lithuanian Sejm of 1652 to approve taxes for the purposes of raising new armies, namely the wojsko komputowe.

== Bibliography ==
- Wojciech Jacek Długołęcki: Batoh 1652. Warszawa: Bellona, 2008, seria: HB. ISBN 83-11-08402-5.
- Tomasz Ciesielski: Od Batohu do Żwańca. Wojna na Ukrainie i w księstwach naddunajskich 1652-1653. Warszawa: „Inforteditions”, 2008. ISBN 978-83-89943-23-1.
