= Moldavian campaign (1684–1691) =

Ottoman victory in the Polish–Ottoman War

- Part of Polish–Ottoman War (1683–1699) and Great Turkish War
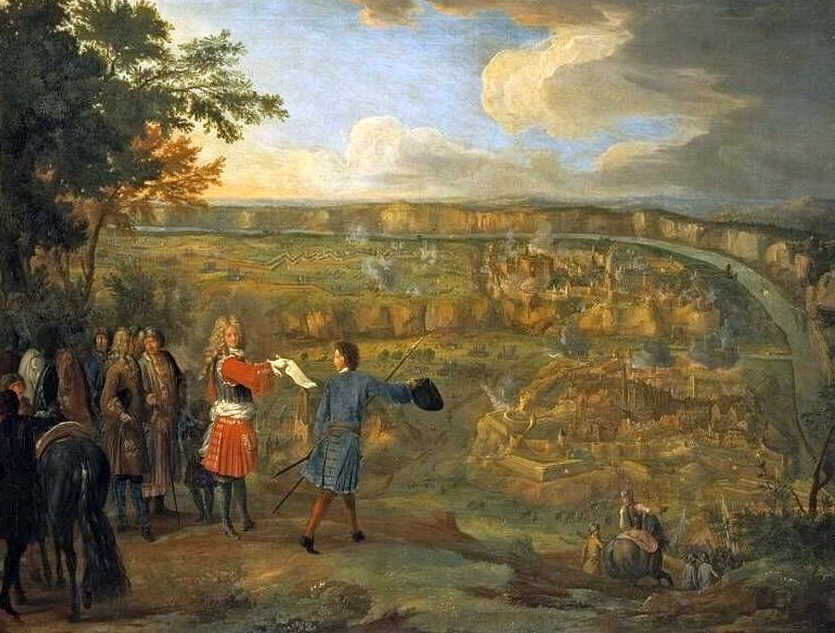
- The capture of Yazlovets by the Polish troops
Date	August 1684 – October 1686 (first phase) late August – late October 1691 (second phase)
Location	Moldavia, Ottoman Empire
Result	Ottoman–led victory

Belligerents
Polish-Lithuanian Commonwealth; Brandenburg-Prussia; Cossack Hetmanate; (Moldavia) Moldavian opposition	Ottoman Empire; Crimean Khanate; Moldavia

Commanders and leaders
John III Sobieski; Stanisław Jan Jabłonowski; Andrzej Potocki; Kazimierz Jan Sapieha; Semyon Paliy (1686–1687)	Unknown

Strength
In 1684: 17,000–20,000 Polish; 2,000 Brandenburgs; 50–60 cannons (1684); In 1691: 28,000–30,000 men	Unknown

Casualties and losses
Heavy	Heavy

The Moldavian campaign of the Polish–Ottoman War of 1683–1699 was launched by the Polish–Lithuanian Commonwealth led by the Polish king, Jan III, in order to control Moldavia. The theatre of the war was split up into four separate phases: of 1684 and the two years following it, and again in 1691. All four efforts ended in failure for the commonwealth, and the last marked the end of the military career of Jan III.

== Background ==
After the victory at the Battle of Vienna, the Polish king, Jan III, decided to continue the war to oust the Ottomans from Europe. He made plans to conquer Moldavia and Wallachia, which would be under the control of his son, Jakub. In fall 1683, the Polish king appointed Stefan Kunicki as the leader of a campaign to oust the Ottomans from Moldavia. After initial success, the Polish-Cossack army was defeated by the Crimean-Ottoman army in the Battle of Reni. In April 1684, Jan made plans to launch another Moldavian campaign by conquering the Danube river mouth. He hoped to achieve two things: cut the supplies off Kamianets-Podilskyi, which was under Ottoman rule, force it to surrender, and isolate the Crimean Khanate from the Ottomans. The Polish king began mobilizing his army; he recruited an army of 17,000 to 20,000 Polish-Lithuanians and 50–60 cannons. Jan also made an agreement with Frederick William, Elector of Brandenburg which the latter provided 2,000 Brandenburg troops. The Papacy significantly played a role in preparing the campaign. His generals, Stanisław Jan Jabłonowski, Andrzej Potocki, and Kazimierz Jan Sapieha, were appointed commanders-in-chief.

== Campaign ==
=== First phase ===
The Polish army set out in August 1684; their first success was capturing Yazlovets on August 24. A strong Ottoman hold in Podolia slightly complicated the situation in Kamenets, but they did not give up. By the end of August, the Polish troops had captured the crossing of the Dniester river, ensuring the safety of the crossing into Moldavia. On September 1, the Polish army reached Zhvanets, where one of the crossings was located. On September 3, the king held a council where they would have disagreements regarding the campaign. The king favored the continuation of the campaign, while Stanisław Jan Jabłonowski was arguing for the siege of Kamenets. On September 4, the construction of a bridge to cross the Dniester had begun, which was complicated by the rain and strong winds, as well as battles with the Crimean troops. After a month, the almost-completed bridge was destroyed by a storm. Jabłonowski spoke in favor of Kamenets siege. On October 1, The Polish army began leaving for Kamenets while simultaneously carrying out another bridge construction. The King dispatched a force to build another crossing near Gródek; however, the Polish army would face the Crimeans in bloody battles, which would slow down their march. Large Ottoman-Crimean forces approached the Dniester, and famine and disease began in the Polish army. The king was forced to abandon the campaign in Moldova and decided to retreat.

=== Second phase ===
Pope Innocent XI demanded the Polish king more vigorous action against the Ottoman front. In June 1685, Poland received money from the Papacy to launch another campaign. In July, Constantin Cantemir became the ruler of Moldavia. Constantin learned of Polish preparations for another campaign. He proposed to the Hetman, Stanisław Jan Jabłonowski, to focus on the siege of Kamenets instead of invading his country. The Polish king, facing serious difficulties during the siege, preferred to march against Moldavia, hoping not only to obtain territory but to cut off supplies from Kamenets. The Polish army consisted of 16,000 to 18,000 men; 12,000 Polish, 2,000–3,000 Lithuanians under Jozef Bogusław Słuszka, and 2,000–3,000 Cossacks under lieutenant Palij.

On August 1, 1685, the Polish army began moving towards the Dniester. On September 10, the Polish army began building a crossing. Five days earlier, the Polish received information of an Ottoman army of 15,000 led by Sulieman Pasha concentration at Țuțora who were delivering supplies to Kamenets. They decided to head there; they reached Sniatyn and there they crossed the border of Moldavian Bukovina. Then the army crossed the forests of Bukovina and headed towards the village of Boiany on September 29. At this time, the Ottomans decided to change their plan, and instead of heading towards Kamianets they turned towards the enemy reaching from the west.

Both armies met at Boiany on October 1, the Ottomans had 12,000 men while the Crimeans 30,000 alongside Moldavians. The Allied army attacked the Polish but despite the outnumbered, the Polish resisted. Constantine at the head of his troops fought alongside the Ottomans. The Following days the Polish turned into defensive, the Polish army found itself in difficult position, afraid of being surrounded and starved, they retreated on the night of October 9 and 10. It was not peaceful as they were chased by the Ottomans and the Crimeans, facing constant attacks. Thanks to Jabłonowski, he was able to cover the retreat of the troops. Having left the Bukovina forest, another battle took place on October 11, where both sides suffered heavy losses.

After that, they arrived at Prut river and the Ottomans stopped the chase. Thus ended the Moldavian campaign of 1685, an unsuccessful expedition due to lack of instruction by the king or the Senate. The failures of the Moldavian campaigns influenced the opinion of Poland allies concerning its military abilities. The king did not give up his plans towards Moldavian policy.

=== Third phase ===
In early 1685, Poland sent its plans to Rome, Vienna, Venice, and Paris for another campaign. The Poles suggested the Austrians dispatch a strong infantry to assist them in capturing Kamenets from the Ottomans or invade Transylvania, while the Poles would invade both Moldavia and Wallachia. The Austrian emperor, Leopold I, rejected the plan and argued for the Poles to besiege Kamenets alone. With this, Jan III decided to campaign alone. Another factor in launching another campaign was the inevitable signing of a bad peace deal with Russia. The unfortunate treaty's settlements needed to be delayed, or better yet, rejected completely, in order for the Polish monarch to obtain a military and political edge over Russia. The advantage would be assured if he subjugated Moldavia and Wallachia and installed Prince Jakub on the throne of one of the aforementioned nations.

According to the military strategy for 1686, Moldavia and Wallachia would be taken over by crossing the Dniester and continuing the offensive towards the Danube. Then Sobieski thought of taking on and neutralizing the Crimean Tatars' military power. Due to this victory, the Ottomans would be forced to withdraw from Kameenets and Moldavia, and the crew of the fortress would be forced to surrender and give the fortress back to the Polish.

The Polish assembled an army of 36,000 men and 88 cannons, supported by a small number of foreign officers, mainly French and German. Jan expected the Moldavians and Wallachians to side with him. On July 21, the Polish marched towards Moldavia, crossing the Bukowina forest without being attacked. On August 14, the Polish arrived at Cecora, where Jan's great-grandfather was killed at the site of the battle in 1620. Two days later, he captured Iași, where he was welcomed as a liberator of Christians. The Moldavian prince, Constantin Cantemir, and the majority of Moldavian Boyas refused to ally with Jan and left the town before their arrival. Jan then established a strong garrison, which would serve as their base.

The majority of Moldavians sided with the Ottomans, while only 2,000 joined the Poles. Jan left Jassy and headed towards the Crimean Territory. The Ottoman-Crimean forces made the Polish march difficult; they destroyed who was left behind from the main army, heavily attacked the Polish camp at night, and laid fire to the steppe, all while avoiding open battles. The king held a council at September 1–2, and his commanders argued to return to Iași. The king ordered a retreat while the Crimean-Ottoman forces exhausted the Poles with their attacks. Two weeks later, they arrived at Iași. A fire broke out on September 15, causing great damage to the city. Anti-Polish sentiment began rising, prompting the Poles to retreat two days later.

The Ottoman-Crimean forces attacked the retreating Poles. The only important fight happened on October 2, when the Polish routed 2,000 Crimean cavalry. They engaged in another last battle six days later. On October 13, they crossed the border near Sniatyn. The campaign ended with the Poles losing 20% to 30% of their forces, and their political aims were not achieved. According to the Polish historian, Władysław Konopczyński, the whole charm of the Polish swords gained in Vienna was lost in the forests of Bukovina and Moldavia's steppes. The Polish side gave up on trying to conquer Moldavia in the future and instead concentrated on trying, albeit unsuccessfully, to take Kamenets back from the enemy.

=== Fourth phase ===
Following little participation from Poland in the war for some years, the Polish king, Jan III, decided to turn to Austria again in 1691. Austria demanded that Poland focus on capturing Kamenets, as the Danube would belong to the Habsburgs; however, in November 1690, the Habsburgs changed their mind and allowed the Poles to occupy Moldavia but granted Wallachia to Austria. In April 1691, the Senate granted the king ratification for another campaign in Moldavia. The Poles assembled an army of 28,000 to 30,000 men.

In late August, the king undertook his last campaign. The king initially achieved success, he managed to capture Soroca and Suceava and routed a detachment of Ottoman-Crimean forces on September 13 near Pererîta. The Polish king issued a manifesto stating:

For the second time, we are not going to this land for another, but only to give our hand and salvation to these countries, which belong to faith, unity, and Christian community and have fallen under the domination of the filthy against their will.

However, the Moldavian prince, Constantin Cantemir, refused to ally with the Poles. Constantin called the Moldavians to resist the Polish king, remained loyal to the Ottomans, and called for help. The Polish army was poorly supplied and lacked food. The Poles marched to Neamț and captured it on October 14. The Poles expected the Austrians, who had promised them help and reinforcements; however, no help arrived. The Ottoman and Crimean armies avoided open battles but exhausted the Polish army with constant attacks. Moldavians also joined the Ottomans in their attacks. Seeing no help coming, the shortage of supplies, and the constant attacks by the enemy prompted the king to retreat to his homeland. The Polish army crossed the borders in late October.

== Aftermath ==
The Polish Crusade into Moldavia failed. The Polish army was not able to cross the Dniester and reach Moldavia. Jan reportedly said to Jan Władysław Brzostowski, the referendum of the Grand Duchy of Lithuania:

The saintly events and our intentions to decent did not come to pass.

The king's plans were ultimately unsuccessful in another Moldavian campaign. Even though Soroca and Neamt had been taken, the 1691 campaign could not be considered a great success. It was Jan III Sobieski's final military campaign as a leader. The ailing monarch never again mounted a horse or put on armor. In his final years, he failed to lead the Republic forces to great victories, which he did not accomplish either.

In the meantime, the nation's disapproval of the continuing conflict grew steadily more widespread. The gentry's desire for peace prevented many people from accepting John III's plans for Moldavia and Wallachia; instead, they were viewed as Sobieski's dynastic interests rather than those of the state. All that remained agreed upon were measures that would help restore the lands lost to Poland in 1672. The nation's perception of the king gradually started to shift as the losses grew.

The old and sick king was losing more and more energy, and Queen Marie Casimire Sobieska took the helm of government from his weakening hands. Poland's military and diplomatic activity fell sharply, while others collected the fruits of the Viennese victory.
