= Kunicki's campaign =

1683–1684 Cossack military expedition

- Part of Polish–Ottoman War (1683–1699) and Great Turkish War
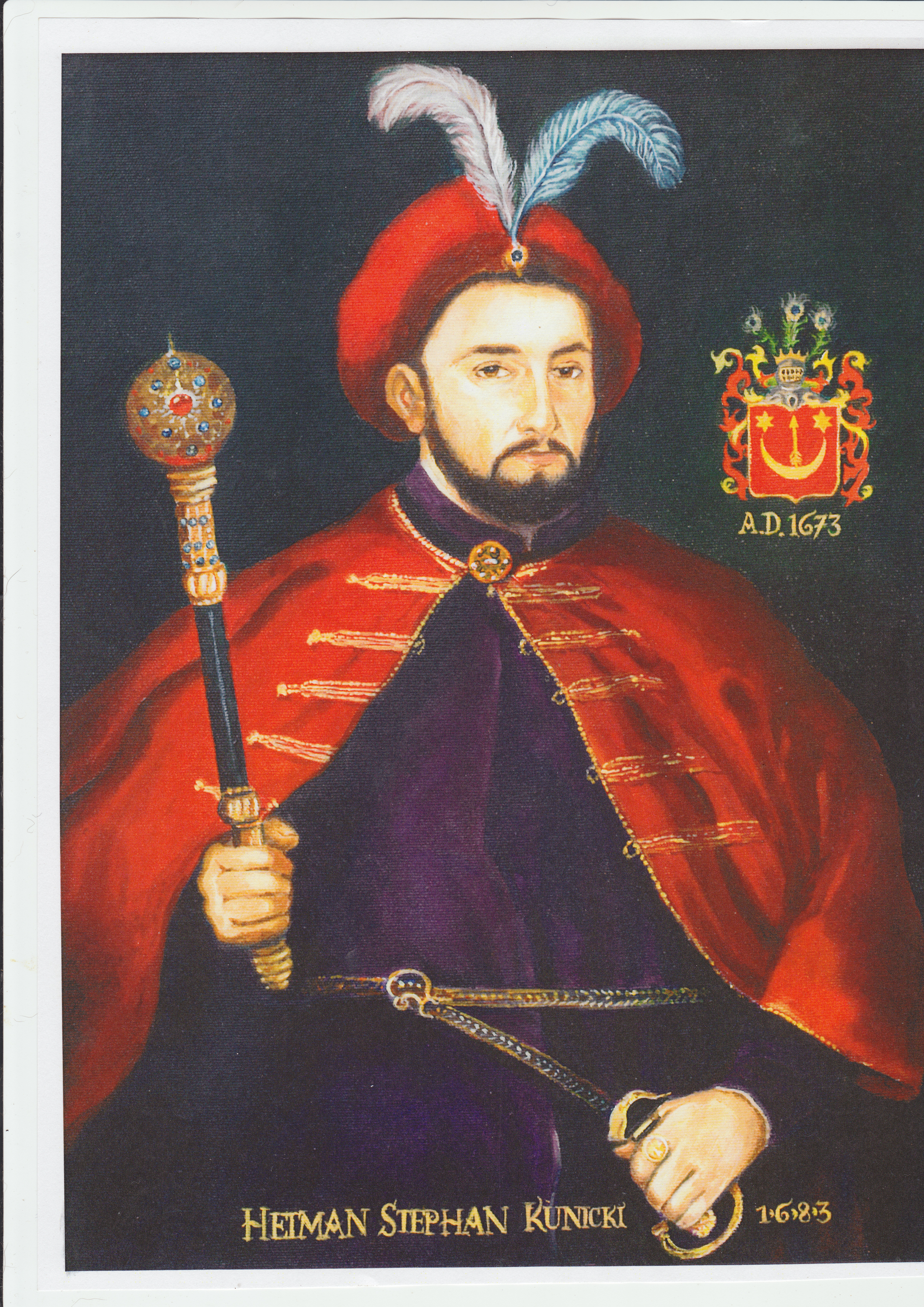
- Stefan Kunicki who led the Anti-Ottoman campaign of 1683–1684
Date	September 1683 – 4 January 1684
Location	Right-bank Ukraine, Podolia, Moldavia, Budjak, Northern Black Sea coast
Result	See § Aftermath Full results: Right-bank and Podolia – Cossack victory; Moldavia and Budjak – Ottoman victory
Territorial changes	Cossacks capture most of the Right-bank Ukraine and parts of Moldavia

Belligerents
Cossack Hetmanate (Note: both the Left- and the Right-bank Hetmanates); Zaporozhian Sich; Poland–Lithuania; Don Cossacks; Moldavia (Pro-Kunicki faction)	Ottoman Empire; Crimean Khanate; Moldavia (Pro-Ottoman faction)

Commanders and leaders
Stefan Kunicki; Andriy Mohyla; Fedir Sulymenko (POW); B. Lazarev; Ștefan Petriceicu	(Ottoman Empire) Yala-Pasha (Ottoman Empire) Yusuf-aga (Ottoman Empire) Ali, bey of Tighina †; Haci II Giray; Ali-Giray †; Ivan Draginich

Strength
In September: 5,000–6,000 (Note: Including 2,000 Left-bank Cossacks, 400 Poles, 200–300 Don Cossacks and 200 Zaporozhians); At the end of campaign: 8,000–30,000 Cossacks and Moldavians	Chițcani: 25,000; Reni: 10,000–12,000; 7 guns

Casualties and losses
Very heavy	Kunicki's claim: Over 300,000 military and civilians killed

The Kunicki's campaign was a major military expedition led by the Right-bank hetman Stefan Kunicki against the Ottoman-Tatar forces in the Right-bank Ukraine, Moldavia and neighbouring territories as a part of the ongoing Great Turkish War. The campaign began in September of 1683, soon after the Christian victory at the Battle of Vienna. Kunicki's army quickly seized most of Right-bank Ukraine, after that the Cossacks, supported by the Moldavian opposition of Ștefan Petriceicu, captured several Moldavian cities, including Chișinău. On 5 of December 1683, the Cossack-Moldavian troops defeated the Turks and Tatars at the battle of Chițcani but on the next month were defeated near Reni. Despite the failure of Kunicki's campaign in Moldavia, the campaign still ended overall successfully as the Cossacks overtook majority of the Right-bank Ukraine (Ottoman Ukraine).

== Background ==
The Right-bank Ukraine was a battlefield ever since 1648, with several conflicts taking place there, such as the Khmelnytsky Uprising, the Polish–Russian War, the Polish–Cossack–Tatar War (1666–1671) and the Polish–Ottoman War. In the last of the named conflicts, the Ottoman Empire had established a protectorate over Doroshenko's Ukraine, which was confirmed by the Treaty of Żurawno in 1676. The attempts of capturing this region by Russia and the Samoylovych's Hetmanate ended in a failure.

The Poland-Lithuania appointed Ostap Hohol a hetman-in-charge of Polish-held regiments in April of 1675, however after his death the Cossack Hetmanate on the Right bank was de-facto dissolved. The need to recreate it appeared with the beginning of Great Turkish War. On 24 of August, John Sobieski, who was preparing for a campaign to Vienna, appointed Stefan Kunicki as a hetman of the Zaporozhian Host on the Right-bank Ukraine. On 12 September, Battle of Vienna took place which resulted in a decisive Holy league victory. This allowed Kunicki to begin his campaign.

== Campaign ==
=== Right-bank and Podolia ===
The campaign began at the end of September. The Cossacks of Kunicki approached Nemyriv and captured it, removing the Ottoman administration of Ivan Draginich. Kunicki was trying to get volunteers from Left-bank, Zaporozhian Sich and the Don Host. In total he managed to gather 5,000-6,000 people, while some sources put this number as high as 20 thousand. In the course of the campaign, Stefan Kunicki also recaptured Czortków, Husiatyn, Yampil and Mohyliv, while his attempts to capture Bar and Medzhybizh ended in a failure.

Some sources claim that Kunicki had raided Moldavia and Budjak in September and then returned to Nemyriv, while other sources claim that the Summer–early Autumn campaign of Kunicki had never actually took place and that Kunicki invaded Moldavia only once.

=== Moldavia and Budjak ===
In the end of October–early November, his army invaded Budjak steppe and Moldavia and began massacring local Tatar villages. After capturing Mohyliv and Yampil, Kunicki's Cossacks crossed the Prut river. On 13 of November, a Cossack rada took place near Tighina, where the Cossacks decided to sack Aq Qirmān, Tighina and Kiliia and raid Budjak. In November, the Cossacks approached the city of Nagai, where an Ottoman–Tatar garrison war dislocated. Kunicki attacked the garrison, defeated it and captured the city. After that he had marched towards Chișinău and soon entered it. There, the Cossack–Polish army of Kunicki united with Moldavian forces of Ștefan Petriceicu, who had accepted the protectorate of Poland–Lithuania and the Cossack Hetmanate. Before entering the city, the Cossacks massacred several Tatar settlements on the way to Chișinău. At the end of November, Kunicki and his Cossacks besieged Tighina, but were not able to capture it.

On 5 of December, several Ottoman–Tatar units led by Yala-Pasha were returning from the campaign in Hungary. Kunicki's Cossacks and Moldavians noticed and attacked them near Chițcani in Moldavia. The battle ended with a decisive Christian victory – Bey of Tighina and Ali-Giray, who was the Khan of Budjak Horde, were killed in the battle and several Tatar murzas were captured. Meanwhile, Petriceicu and his Moldavian and Polish units, entered Iași and was proclaimed a prince of Moldavia. After the victory at Chițcani, the Cossacks besieged Tighina on 6 of December, but once again failed to capture it and went on a raid in Budjak. They ravaged Izmail, Kiliia and settlements near Akkerman, wiping out almost the entire Tatar population of Budjak. At the end of December, Kunicki found out about the upcoming Crimean–Ottoman units of Haci Giray, who were returning from Central Europe.

He then left Budjak and went towards the Prut. Near Tobak fortress his army stood up a camp and was preparing to cross the river. On 30 of December, they were caught up by Haci Girays 12,000-strong army and their camp was besieged, while the Cossacks were waiting assistance from Andrzej Potocki, who stayed in Iași. On 1 of January, a rada took place in the Cossack camp. Few days later, the Moldavians left the battlefield.

Kunicki and his units of approximately from 300 to 2000 people soon crossed the Prut and did the same, retreating to Iași and then to Nemyriv. Andriy Mohyla, who was left in the camp with his 4,000 soldiers, managed to fight out of the ambush with heavy casualties and retreat to Ukraine with 3,000 people.

== Aftermath ==
Stefan Kunicki stayed in Iași from 7 to 9 January. While being there, he tried to explain his behaviour by the betrayal and desertion of Moldavians from the battlefield, which "motivated the Cossacks to do the same and forced him to retreat as well", while the Cossacks and Moldavians that did not retreat with Kunicki blamed him for the defeat. The campaign in the Right-bank ended with a Cossack success, Nemyriv and several other cities were recaptured from the Ottoman rule and the Cossack administration was installed there.

Although the expedition to Moldavia ended in a failure due to the defeat at Reni, it can still be considered somewhat successful, as the campaign forced a large number of Tatar soldiers to abandon their positions in Hungary. The campaign in Budjak ended with a very heavy civilian casualties, the Cossacks of Kunicki brutally massacred tens of thousands of Nogais and Lipka Tatars. In March of 1684, a new Cossack rada took place in Mohyliv, where Andriy Mohyla was recognised the new hetman. Kunicki was captured and executed, while trying to escape from the place of rada.

Potocki failed to provide help for Petriceicu, and in April of 1684 he was fully defeated and retreated on the territory of Commonwealth. Fedir Sulymenko, who was captured by the Turks in the course of campaign, went over to their side and was appointed as a hetman of the Ottoman Ukraine. He attempted to capture Nemyriv from Mohyla but failed and was executed in 1685.

== Bibliography ==
- Chukhlib, Taras Vasylyovych (2007). The winter campaign of 1683–1684 of the Ukrainian Cossacks against the Ottomans to the Black Sea Steppe. Institute of History of Ukraine.
- Kochegarov, Kirill (2005). ""Участие украинского казачества в кампании 1683 года против Османской империи // Україна в Центрально-Східній Європи."". Slavic Almanac.
- Rolle, Antoni (1880). Zameczki podolskie na kresach multańskich (in Polish). Vol. 3. Kraków: Gebethner i Wolff. pp. 208–209.
