= Battle of Pererîta =

- Part of the Moldavian campaign (1684–1691) and Polish–Ottoman War (1683–1699)
Date	13 September 1691
Location	Pererîta, Principality of Moldavia (now in Moldova) 48°12′N 26°55′E
Result	Polish-Lithuanian victory

Belligerents
Polish-Lithuanian commonwealth	Ottoman Empire; Crimean Khanate

Commanders and leaders
Jan III Sobieski	Murza Arslan †

Strength
1,500	35,000

Casualties and losses
40 killed	Heavy
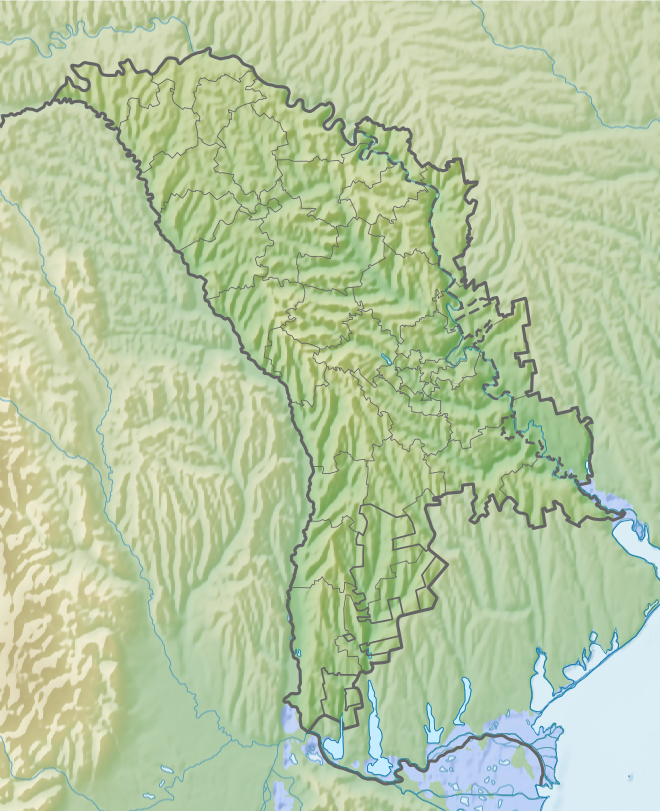
- Location within Europe Battle of Pererîta (Moldova)

The Battle of Pererîta (Note: Polish: Bitwa pod Pererytą; Turkish: Pererita Muharebesi) was a clash between the troops of the Polish–Lithuanian Commonwealth and Turkish–Tatar detachments on 13 September 1691 in the village of Pererîta, located in present-day Moldova. The battle was part of the Polish campaign against Moldavia, taking place within the broader context of the Polish–Ottoman War (1683–1699) and the Great Turkish War, and resulted in a Polish–Lithuanian victory.

On September 1, Sobieski, at the head of his army, departed from the camp near Vishnevchik. By September 6, they reached Chernivtsi, having covered a distance of approximately 25 kilometers. On September 7, the decision was made to continue the march along the left bank of the Prut River. The following day, a camp was established near Pererîta. Sobieski’s plan was to bypass the Bukovina forests, which had caused significant difficulties for the Polish troops, and advance further into Moldavia. After finding a suitable ford, the army prepared to cross the Prut River. Sobieski aimed to achieve a decisive victory that would secure his control over the region.

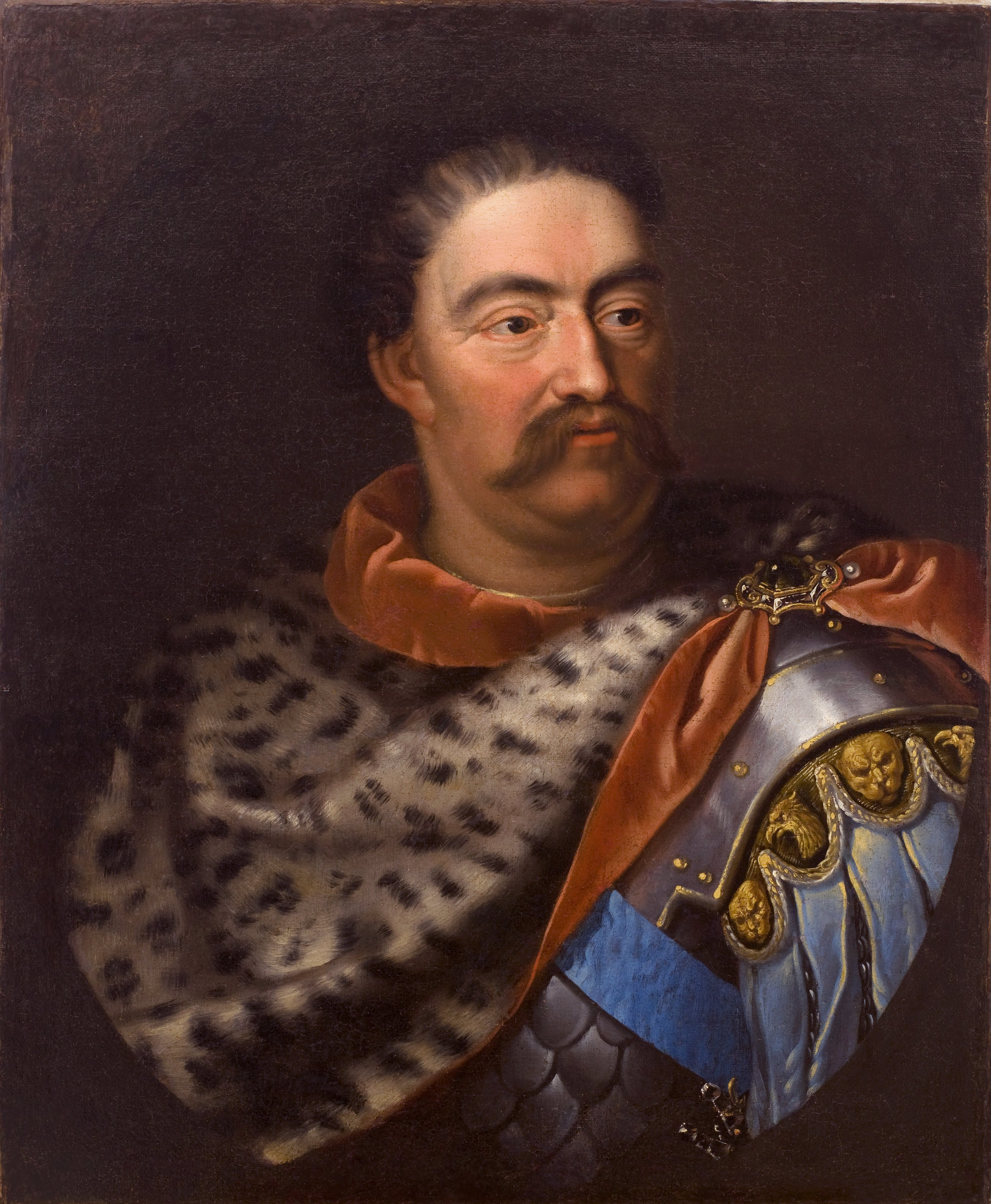
Portrait of John Sobieski by Jan Tricius

The Poles learned from a prisoner that a 20,000-strong Tatar horde was advancing from the east. Attempts to gain a more accurate understanding of the enemy’s forces were unsuccessful. Meanwhile, Hussar lieutenant Vaclav Iskra and his banner, positioned in the vanguard, clashed with a Tatar detachment. The Tatars forced the Poles to retreat and, during the pursuit, killed their best officers, including Iskra.

On September 13, the camp was disbanded, and Sobieski, upon learning of a Tatar detachment ahead, dispatched Hieronymus Lyubomirsky with a force of 1,500 horsemen to confront them. The Tatars feigned a retreat, luring the Poles into a prepared trap and drawing them approximately 15 kilometers away from the camp. Lyubomirsky’s troops regrouped at the "great mountain" and mounted a determined defense. Reinforcements soon arrived in the form of three armored banners under Sapieha’s command. However, it took six hours for the main forces to reach the battlefield. After firing three cannon volleys, the Tatars began to retreat. The Poles suffered approximately 40 casualties, with many wounded and others captured. While the exact number of Tatar losses remains unclear, significant casualties were inflicted, including the death of their commander, Murza Arslan, on the battlefield.

Sobieski was counting on a general battle, but the enemy avoided engagement. The Tatar troops retreated, enabling the forces of the Polish-Lithuanian Commonwealth to cross the Prut River and advance deeper into Moldavia.
