= Battle of Reni =

1683–84 battle of the Polish–Ottoman War

- Part of Polish–Ottoman War (1683–1699) & Great Turkish War
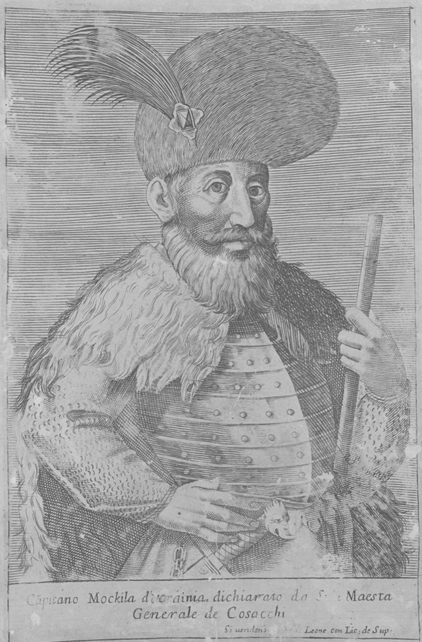
- Andriy Mohyla, who led the troops after the retreat of Kunicki
Date	30 December 1683 – 4 January 1684
Location	Reni, Ottoman Empire (now Ukraine)
Result	Crimean–Ottoman victory

Belligerents
Polish-Lithuanian Commonwealth; Cossack Hetmanate; Moldavia	Crimean Khanate; Ottoman Empire

Commanders and leaders
Stefan Kunicki; Andriy Mohyla; Ștefan Petriceicu	Haci II Giray

Strength
25,000–30,000 Polish-Cossacks (Moldavia) Unknown	10,000–12,000 men 7 guns

Casualties and losses
5,000–6,000 Killed; 4,000–5,000 Injured; 2,000 Fugitives	Unknown

The battle of Reni was a military engagement between the Crimean-Ottoman army and the joint Polish-Cossack-Moldavian army that happened in the village of Reni. The Crimean-Turkish army defeated the Christians, ending Kunicki's campaign.

== Background ==
On August 24, 1683, the Polish king, John III Sobieski, appointed Stefan Kunicki with mission of recruiting Cossacks for a war against the Ottomans. The new Hetman had appointed Kazimyr Staneskyi and Andriy Mohyla. Kunicki recruited 5,000 to 6,000 men, including 2,000 left-bank Cossacks, 400 Polish soldiers, 200 Zaporozhians, and 200–300 Don Cossacks. The campaign was partially financed by the Papacy, which helped the Cossacks buy several guns, gunpowder, and bullets. In November 1683, the Polish-Cossack army was joined by the pro-Polish Moldavian prince, Ștefan Petriceicu. On December 5, the Polish-Cossack-Moldavian army defeated the Crimean-Ottoman army in Chițcani. After this, the Cossack received intelligence about the approach of the remaining Ottoman army from Vienna.

== Battle ==
As they were marching, they met a large Crimean army of 10,000 to 12,000 men and 7 cannons, alongside Janissaries led by Haci II Giray. The Allies were overtaken on December 30. The battles lasted for five days, resisting the Crimeans while waiting for Polish reinforcements from Kraków. On December 31, the battle raged all day. On January 1, a council was held, and it is unknown what decision was made there. The next two days saw a fierce onslaught during which the allies were unable to push back the enemy. Kunicki decided to retreat with 300–500 cavalry, leaving Andri Mohyla with the remaining troops of 4,500. He fought with the Tatars the whole day, and both sides sustained heavy casualties before retreating at night. Many of the Cossacks perished while attempting to cross the Prut river. Andrii returned with only 3,000 men to Ukraine, ending the battle on January 4.

== Aftermath ==
Kunicki attempted to explain his defeat to the Polish king by stating the dragoons fled from the field, allowing the Cossacks to flee as well. The Moldavians and the Cossacks who remained in the field blamed Kunicki for their defeat. Two months later, Kunicki was deposed and killed for his failures.

== Sources ==
- Taras Vasilyevich Chukhlib (2007), The winter campaign of 1683–1684 of the Ukrainian Cossacks against the Ottomans to the Black Sea Steppe.
- Rabbi David Lekhno (2021), Debar Śepatayim, An Ottoman Hebrew Chronicle from the Crimea (1683–1730).
- Joseph von Hammer (1838), Histoire de l'Empire Ottoman depuis son origine jusqu'à nos jours.
