= Moldavian campaign =

Moldavian campaign may refer to:

- Moldavian Magnate Wars
- Moldavian campaign (1497–1499)
- Moldavian campaign of Tymofiy Khmelnytsky
- Moldavian campaign (1684–1691)
