= Polish–Ottoman War (1683–1699) =

Conflict between the Polish–Lithuanian Commonwealth and the Ottoman Empire

- Part of the Polish–Ottoman Wars and the Great Turkish War
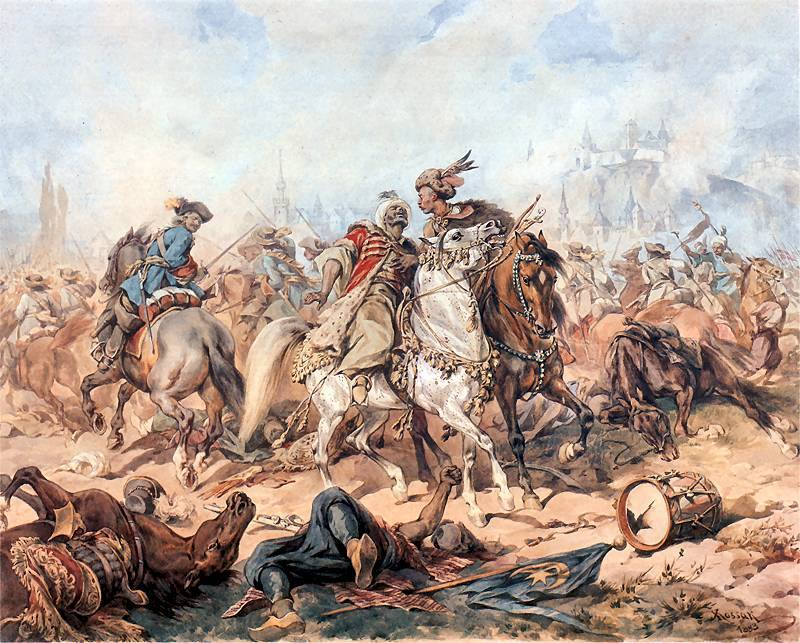
- Painting of the Battle of Párkány by Juliusz Kossak (1683)
Date	12 September 1683 – 26 January 1699 (15 years, 4 months and 2 weeks)
Location	Austria, Crimea, Hungary, Moldavia, Serbia and Ukraine
Result	Polish-Lithuanian victory; Treaty of Karlowitz
Territorial changes	Ottoman Empire returned Podolia and the south of Right-bank Ukraine to Poland–Lithuania; Poland–Lithuania returned Khotyn, taken in 1673, to the Principality of Moldavia, as well as Câmpulung, Soroca, Suceava and Neamț, taken in 1686 and 1691.

Belligerents
Polish–Lithuanian Commonwealth: Right-bank Ukraine; Zaporozhian Cossacks; Holy Roman Empire: Brandenburg-Prussia; Tsardom of Russia (1686–1699)	Ottoman Empire; Crimean Khanate; Principality of Upper Hungary (until 1685); Transylvania; Hungarian Kuruc Resistance

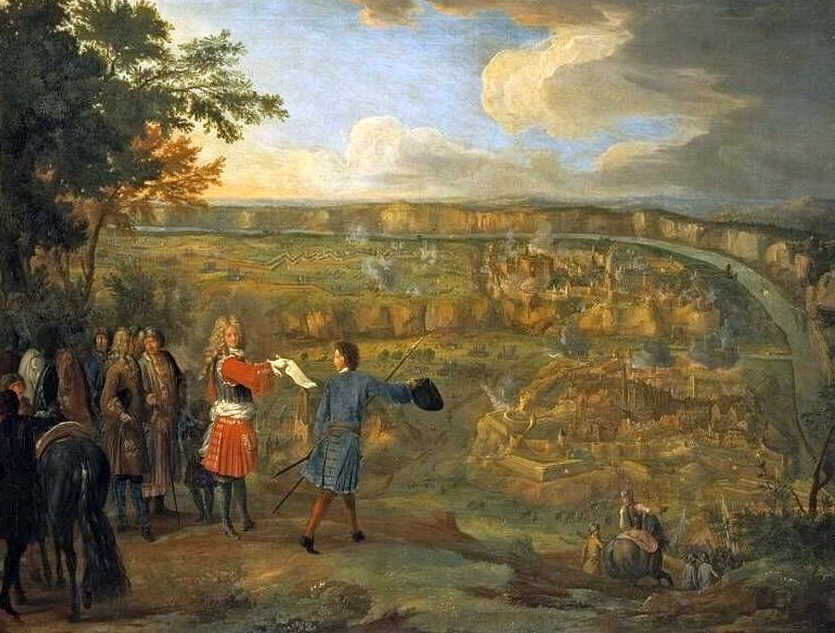
Martin: Battle of Yazlovets 1684, Schleissheim Palace collection

The Polish–Ottoman War or the War of the Holy League was the Polish side of the conflict that is otherwise known as the Great Turkish War. The conflict began with a Polish victory at the Battle of Vienna in 1683 and ended with the Treaty of Karlowitz, which restored to the Polish–Lithuanian Commonwealth lands lost in the previous Polish–Ottoman War (1672–76)). It was the last conflict between the Commonwealth and the Ottoman Empire; despite the Polish victory, it marked the decline of power not only the Ottoman Empire but also the Commonwealth, which would never again interfere in affairs outside its declining borders.

== War ==
After a few years of peace, the Ottoman Empire attacked the Habsburg Empire again. The Ottomans almost captured Vienna, but the King of Poland, John III Sobieski, led a Christian alliance, which defeated them at the Battle of Vienna which shook the Ottoman Empire's hegemony in South-Eastern Europe.

A new Holy League was initiated by Pope Innocent XI and encompassed the Holy Roman Empire (headed by Habsburg Austria), the Venetian Republic and Poland in 1684, joined by Tsarist Russia in 1686. The Ottomans suffered two decisive defeats against the Holy Roman Empire: the second Battle of Mohács in 1687 and, a decade later, in 1697, the Battle of Zenta.

=== Moldavian campaign ===
On the smaller Polish front, after the battles of 1683 (Vienna and Parkany), Sobieski, after his proposal for the League to start a major coordinated offensive, undertook a rather unsuccessful offensive in Moldavia in 1686, with the Ottomans refusing a major engagement and harassing the army. For the next four years, Poland would blockade the key fortress at Kamenets, and the Ottoman Tatars would raid the borderlands. In 1691, Sobieski undertook another expedition to Moldavia, with slightly better results but still with no decisive victories.

=== Conclusion ===
The last battle of the campaign was the Battle of Podhajce in 1698 in which Polish hetman Feliks Kazimierz Potocki defeated the Ottoman incursion into the Commonwealth. The League won the war in 1699 and forced the Ottoman Empire to sign the Treaty of Karlowitz. The Ottomans lost much of their European possessions, with Podolia (including Kamenets) returned to Poland and the imposition of Austria.

== Battles ==
Please note, these battles represent the Polish-Ottoman front only, and do not include battles of the Great Turkish War that occurred without significant participation of the Polish troops.

- Battle of Vienna (12 September 1683)
- Battle of Párkány (Slovak: Štúrovo) (7–9 October 1683)
- Kunicki's expedition on the Right-bank and Moldavia (1683–1684)
  - Battle of Chițcani (5 December 1683)
  - Battle of Reni (30 December–4 January 1684)
- Battle of Studenitsa (1684)
- Battle of Yazlovets (1684)
- Battle of Boiany (1685)
- Siege of Kamenets (1687)
- Battle of Novoselka (1688)
- Battle of Suceava (1690)
- Battle of Pererîta (1691)
- Battle of Târgu Neamț (1691)
- Battle of Hodów (June 1694)
- Battle of Ustechko (Ukrainian: Устечко) (6 October 1694)
- Battle of Lwów (Lviv) (1695)
- Battle of Podhajce (8–9 September 1698)
