= Battle of Chițcani (1683) =

- Part of Polish–Ottoman War (1683–1699), Great Turkish War and Kunicki's campaign
Date	5 December 1683
Location	Chițcani, Moldavia
Result	Polish–Cossack–Moldavian victory

Belligerents
Polish-Lithuanian Commonwealth; Cossack Hetmanate; Moldavia	Ottoman Empire; Budjak Horde

Commanders and leaders
(Cossack Hetmanate) Stefan Kunicki (Cossack Hetmanate) Andriy Mohyla; Ștefan Petriceicu	Yala-Pasha; Ali, bey of Tighina †

Strength
15,000–18,000	25,000

Casualties and losses
None (Kunicki's claim)	Unknown (many killed)

Battle of Chițcani (1683) was a battle of the united Cossack troops of the Polish-Lithuanian Commonwealth under the command of the Right-bank Hetman Stefan Kunicki and Moldavian army Ștefan Petriceicu with detachments of the Budjak Horde on 5 December 1683 during Kunicki's campaign at the beginning of the Polish-Ottoman War (1683–1699).

== History ==
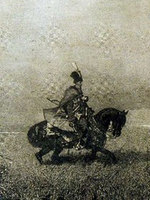
A Cossack on horseback. 17th century.

On 23 July 1683, the council of the Right-bank Cossacks in the presence of 40 chiefs appealed to the Polish king John III Sobieski with a request to accept the Right Bank Cossacks under his authority and allow a campaign against the Turkish possessions. On 24 August of the same year, the Polish monarch appointed Stefan Kunicki as hetman of the Right-bank Zaporizhian Cossacks. During the summer and autumn of 1683 Kunicki's army made several campaigns and occupied Nemyriv, Chișinău, Bender. At the end of 1683, the 5,000-strong army of the hetman made a campaign through Moldavian lands to the Budzhak and Bilhorod steppes.

On 5 December, a 15,000-strong Cossack-Moldavian detachment of Kunicki and Ștefan Petriceicu suddenly attacked a 25,000-strong detachment of Ali-Pasha near the village of Chițcani, not far from the bank of the Danube. The Tatars were defeated, during the pursuit many Horde men were killed (Ali-Pasha, Aliger-Pasha, several murza) and Tatar commanders were taken prisoner.

Later Kunicki noted that not a single man in his army was killed. Having won the victory, the hetman of the Right-bank Ukraine moved deep into the Nogai possessions. Stefan Kunicki and his Cossacks destroyed the settlements around Bilhorod (Akkerman) and reached the shores of the Black Sea, taking by storm the cities of Izmail and Kiliia. After this success Hetman Kunicki tried to take Bilhorod, but because of the lack of artillery he failed. Part of the Cossacks, weighed down with booty, returned to Ukraine.

== Literature ==
- Чухліб Тарас. Гетьман С. Куницький у боротьбі Правобережної України та Речі Посполитої проти Османської імперії (1683−1684 рр.) // Україна в Центрально-Східній Європі. Студії з історії ХІ−ХУІІІ ст. K, 2000.
- Marek Wagner W cieniu szukamy jasności chwały. Studia z dziejów panowania Jana III Sobieskiego (1684−1696). – Wydawnictwo Akademii Podlaskiej, 2002. – ISBN 83-7051-201-1.
- Jan Wimmer Odsiecz wiedenska 1683 roku.
