= Battles of Kamianets-Podilskyi =

Battle of Kamianets-Podilskyi or Battle of Kamenets-Podolsky may refer to:

- Sack of Kamenets (1240), by Batu Khan
- Battle of Kamenets (1648), by Maksym Kryvonis
- Battle of Kamenets (1651), city was attacked by Ivan Bohun
- Siege of Kamenets (1652), by Tymofiy Khmelnytsky
- Siege of Kamenets (1655), by Bohdan Khmelnytsky
- Siege of Kamenets (1672), by Sultan Mehmed IV against the Polish-Lithuanian Commonwealth
- Battle of Kamenets (1673), unsuccessful attack by John III Sobieski
- Battle of Kamenets (1683), Andrzej Potocki defeated Turkish and Tatar detachments on the outskirts of the city
- Siege of Kamenets (1687), unsuccessful siege by Prince James Louis Sobieski
- Kamenets Campaign (1698), unsuccessful campaign by Polish king Augustus II
- Siege of Kamenets (1703), by Fedir Shpak's rebels
- Attack on Kamenets (1734), by Verlan's haydamaks
- Battle of Kamenets (1764), by General Mikhail Dashkov
- Siege of Kamenets (1792), by Catherine the Great during the Russo-Polish War (1792)
- Capture of Kamenets-Podolsky (1914), by Austro-Hungarian troops
- Battle of Kamianets-Podilskyi (1918), battle between the UPR and Bolsheviks
- Kamianets-Podilskyi Uprising, anti-Petlurean uprising against the Directorate of Ukraine
- Battle of Kamianets-Podilskyi (1919), occupation of city by the Red Army
- Second Battle of Kamiantes-Podilskyi (1919), second battle between the UPR and Red Army units
- Capture of Kamianets-Podilskyi (1919), by the White Army
- Battle of Kamenets-Podolsky (1941), Axis victory over the Soviets during the Second World War
- Proskurov-Chernovtsy Operation, a Soviet victory in the Second World War
  - Kamenets-Podolsky pocket (1944)

== See also ==
- Kamianets-Podilskyi
