= Andriy Mohyla =

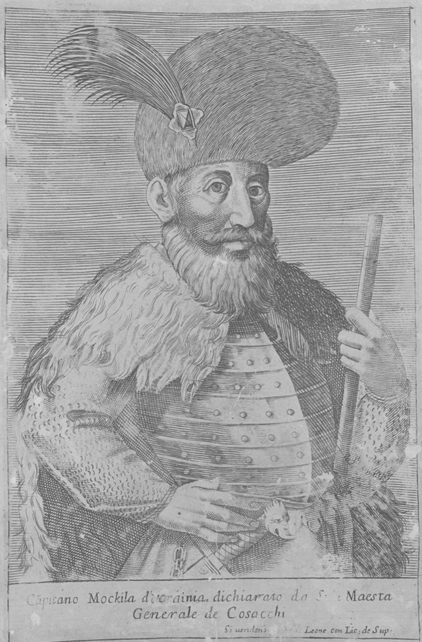
Andriy Mohyla as "captain Mockila of Ukraine" and "general of the Cossacks" on an Italian engraving from 1649.

Mohyla coat of arms

Andriy Mohyla (Note: Ukrainian: Андрій Могиила, also Могиленко (Mohylenko) or Мигула (Myhula). Polish: Andrzej Mohyła. Romanian: Andrei Movilă.) (c. 1630 – January 1689) was a Ukrainian Cossack military, political and public figure. As Hetman of the Registered Cossacks, he was the head of state of the Cossack Hetmanate in Right-bank Ukraine, based in Nemyriv (1684–1689). He oversaw the Restoration of Cossackdom in Right-bank Ukraine (1685), and the resettlement of the lands in Central Ukraine that had been devastated and depopulated during The Ruin. Andriy Mohyla was the nephew of Petro Mohyla, founder of the National University of Kyiv-Mohyla Academy.

Mohyla was born around 1630 in a Cossack family, probably in the Poltava region. In the 1670s and early 1680s, he was a Distinguished Loyal Fellow (Ukrainian: присяглий товариш, romanized: prysyahlij tovarysh) in one of the cavalry companies (компанійські полки) of the Left-bank Hetmanate; he also spent some time in the Zaporizhian Sich (at Chortomlyk). By the end of 1683, he is recorded as a Colonel in the army of Right-bank Hetman Stefan Kunicki, leading an infantry division of 3,000~4,000 Cossacks in Kunicki's campaign in Moldavia (September 1683 – 4 January 1684). Mohyla distinguished himself in the Battle of Chițcani (1683) and the Battle of Reni (30 December 1683). In the latter battle, Kunicki's cavalry fled the fighting to escape encirclement by the Tatars, leaving Mohyla behind with the infantry to break through the Tatar lines; after significant casualties on both sides, Mohyla's Cossack infantry managed to retreat to Ukraine in good order, earning him a reputation as a brave commander loyal to his soldiers. The disgraced Kunicki was widely regarded as a coward and deposed, and in a Cossack Rada of January 1684, Mohyla was elected the new Hetman, a decision later approved by King John III Sobieski on 30 January.

Mohyla managed to attract many peasants (mostly from the Left Bank) to resettle the Right Bank after decades of devastation and depopulation. In addition, the number of Cossack soldiers on the Right Bank reportedly increased by as much as 8,000, providing protection against Crimean and Ottoman raids.

== Bibliography ==
- Chukhlib, Taras Vasylyovych (2007). Зимовий похід 1683/1684 рр. українського козацтва проти Османів до причорноморського Степу [The winter campaign of 1683–1684 of the Ukrainian Cossacks against the Ottomans to the Black Sea Steppe.]. The Black Sea Region in the 9th century BC – early 19th century: studies in history and archaeology. No. 1 (in Ukrainian). Kyiv: Institute of History of Ukraine, National Academy of Sciences of Ukraine.
- Chukhlib, Taras (2010). "Могила (Могиленко, Мигула) Андрій" [Mohyla (Mohylenko, Myhula) Andriy]. Encyclopedia of History of Ukraine (in Ukrainian). Vol. 7. Kyiv: Institute of History of Ukraine. pp. 11–12. Archived from the original on 5 October 2026.
- Tairova-Yakovleva, Tatiana (2020). Ivan Mazepa and the Russian Empire (PDF). Montreal Kingston London Chicago: McGill-Queen's Press. p. 425. ISBN 978-0-2280-0309-0.
