= Battle of Párkány =

1683 battle during the Polish-Ottoman War

- Part of Polish–Ottoman War (1683–1699); Great Turkish War
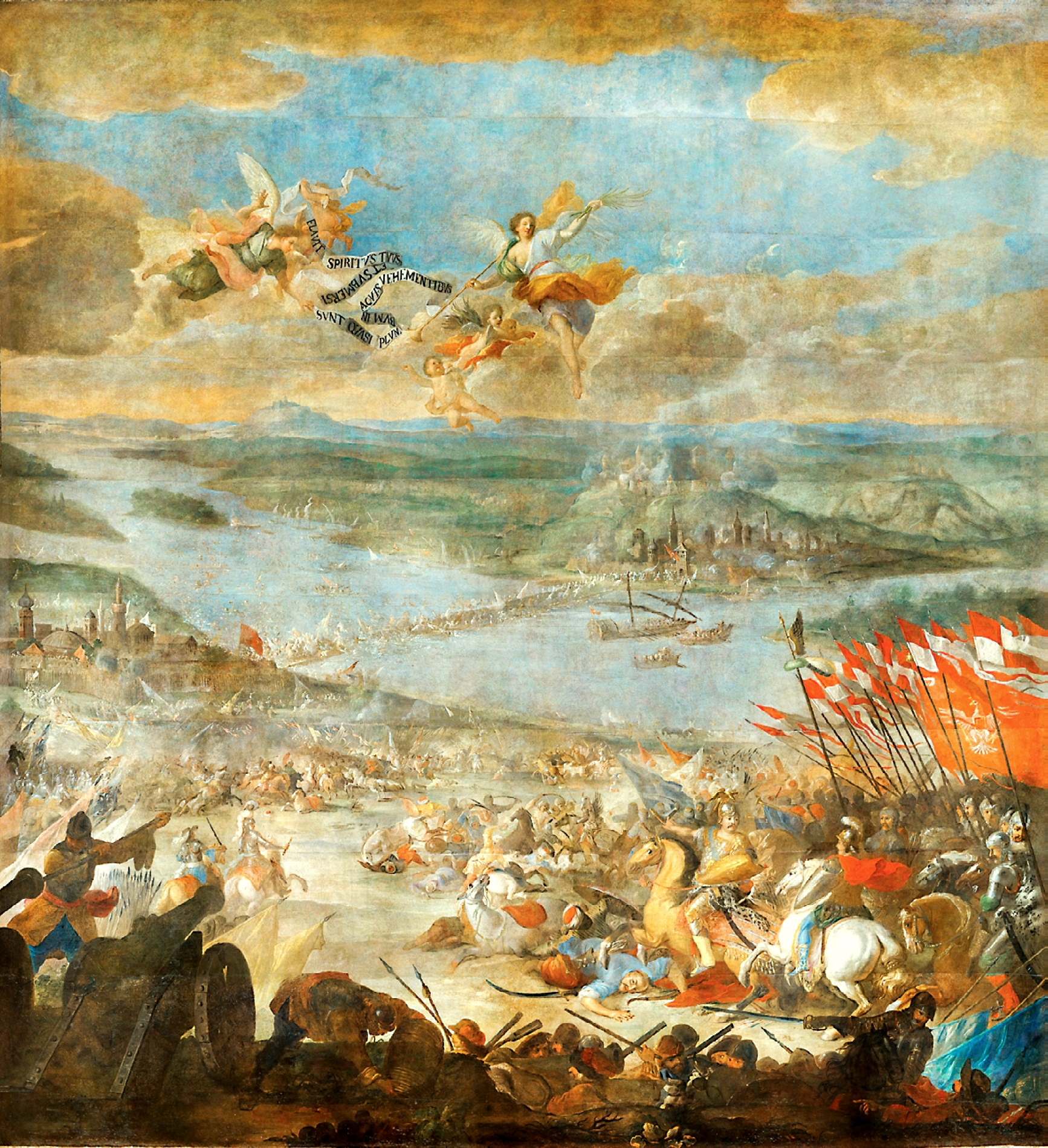
- John III of Poland at the Battle of Párkány in 1683
Date	October 7–9, 1683
Location	Párkány (Ciğerdelen, then Ottoman Empire; now Štúrovo, Slovakia) 47°47′57″N 18°43′05″E
Result	Christian Coalition victory
Territorial changes	The Habsburgs take control of Párkány.

Belligerents
Poland–Lithuania; Holy Roman Empire	Ottoman Empire; Principality of Upper Hungary

Commanders and leaders
John III Sobieski; Charles V, Duke of Lorraine; Ernst Rüdiger von Starhemberg; Ludwig Wilhelm, Margrave of Baden-Baden; Stanisław Jan Jabłonowski	Kara Mehmed Pasha; Kara Mustafa Pasha; Imre Thököly

Strength
27,000 troops	17,000 troops 1,000 Janissary

Casualties and losses
1,000 killed	9,000 killed or captured

The Battle of Párkány (Turkish: Ciğerdelen Savaşı) was fought between October 7–9, 1683 in the town of Párkány (today: Štúrovo), in the Ottoman Empire, and the area surrounding it as part of the Polish-Ottoman War and the Great Turkish War. The battle was fought in two stages. In the first stage Polish troops under John III Sobieski were defeated by the Ottoman army under Kara Mehmed Pasha on October 7, 1683. In the second stage Sobieski, supported by Austrian forces under Charles V, Duke of Lorraine, defeated the Ottoman forces, which were supported by the troops of Imre Thököly, and gained control of Párkány on October 9, 1683. After the Ottoman defeat, the Austrians would besiege Esztergom and captured it at the end of 1683.

== Prelude to battle ==
On May 1, 1683, the Ottoman Empire attacked the Holy Roman Empire and besieged Vienna on July 14, 1683. On September 6 the Polish army under John III Sobieski arrived in Tulln and united with Imperial forces and additional troops from Saxony, Bavaria, Baden, Franconia and Swabia who had answered the call for a Holy League that was supported by Pope Innocent XI.

The Ottoman army, totaling around 150,000 men under Kara Mustafa Pasha, was defeated on September 11, 1683. The main part of the Ottoman forces retreated to the Balkans. A part of the Ottoman army under Kara Mehmed Pasha encamped in Párkány, Hungary, where they were supported by Imre Thököly, a local ruler. Polish forces under Sobieski followed the Ottoman troops to Párkány to destroy them as they retreated.

== Battle ==
=== First stage ===
On October 6, 1683, the Polish army reached the environs of Párkány. The army commanders advised caution, suggesting the advanced guards should rest for a day. Instead, Sobieski decided to surprise the Ottoman army by attacking it with his cavalry. On October 7, 1683, a Polish force of around 5,000 under Sobieski advanced in a rather disorganized manner towards the Ottoman positions. A Polish dragoon regiment under Stefan Bidziński was leading the advance. Suddenly a mass of Ottoman cavalry surged forward to attack them. The dragoon regiment was caught completely by surprise—it did not even have the match-cords of its muskets lit—and was quickly overwhelmed. The surviving dragoons fled back in panic into Sobieski's main force, closely followed by the Turkish horseman, and forced the Poles to beat a hasty retreat to the safety of the Imperial army, which was following several kilometers behind. The Polish army lost around 1,000 soldiers; only the intervention of the Imperial cavalry prevented the Ottoman troops from causing far heavier losses.

=== Second stage of battle ===
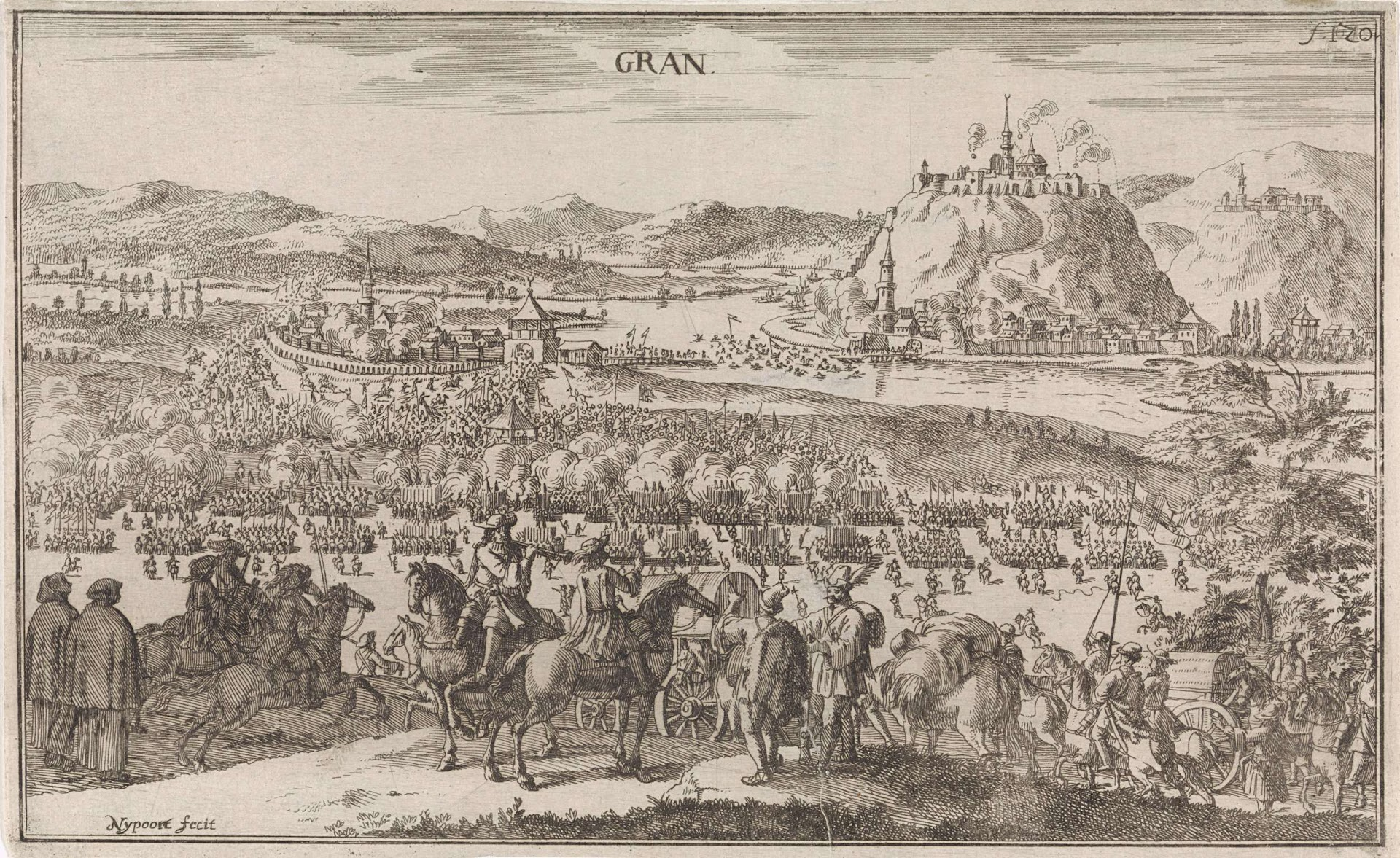
The Battle of Párkány with Esztergom in the background

On October 8, 1683, Imperial reinforcements totaling 16,700 troops under Charles V, Duke of Lorraine joined the Polish army. After defeating the Polish cavalry, Kara Mehmed Pasha was sent 8,000 elite cavalrymen by Kara Mustafa Pasha. The troops of Imre Thököly were waiting for attack orders on the outskirts of Párkány. On October 9, 1683, the Imperial Army formed three lines. In the center of the lines were positioned 7,600 infantrymen under Ernst Rüdiger von Starhemberg. The Polish army was positioned on the wings. Sobieski led the right wing and Stanisław Jan Jabłonowski the left On the right side of the lines 4,500 German cavalry under Ludwig Wilhelm, Margrave of Baden-Baden were positioned. On the left side of the lines 4,500 cavalry were positioned under Johann von Dünewald. The battle began with the Ottoman right launching a fierce attack on the Imperial left who repelled them. Undeterred, the Ottomans moved reinforcements from their center to strengthen their right flank who launched a renewed 2nd attack that was again checked by the Holy League's left.

Seeing the bulk of the Ottoman forces committed, Charles V ordered a general assault with his unengaged center and right. The Imperial center advanced then wheeled left and outflanked the Ottoman right wing, forcing it back. Meanwhile, the right wing composed of Polish hussars under the vengeful Sobieski charged forward, eager to avenge the previous day's humiliation and crashed through the Ottoman left flank. This signaled the collapse of the entire Ottoman lines as the Turks were routed from the battlefield. An abject slaughter began of the fleeing Turks as the Christian forces rode them down. Many fell into the Hron river and drowned. A force of Janissaries holding the gardens near Parkany were cut off and trapped. They attempted to escape across the pontoon bridges to Esztergom but the Christian forces brought up cannons to the river banks and fired on the fleeing Turks, collapsing the bridges, throwing hundreds into the water. Some 9,000 Turks were lost as compared to 1,000 for the Christian forces.

== Aftermath ==
After defeating the Ottomans in Párkány, the imperial forces continued their march and inflicted several more defeats on the Ottomans, while gaining control of Ottoman territories in Hungary. Kara Mustafa Pasha was executed by the sultan for failing to defend the Hungarian territories of the Ottoman Empire.

== Legacy ==
The Turkish writer Safiye Erol (1902-1964) created the novel Ciğerdelen in 1946. The events in Ciğerdelen are related to the battle.
