= Parkan (castle) =

Coordinates: 47°47′58″N 18°43′16″E

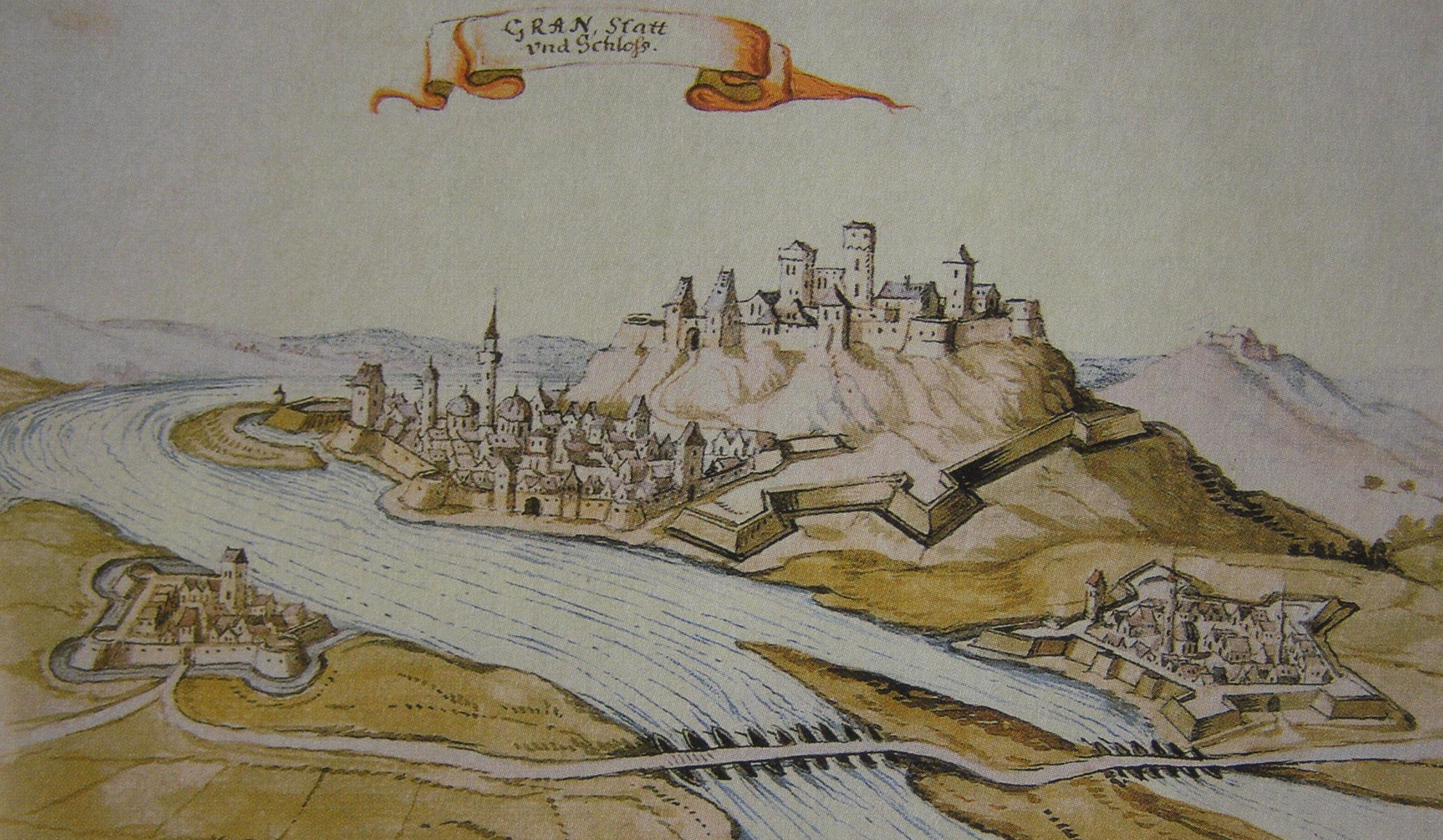
Estergon (Gran) with the fortified outpost of Parkan on the northern banks of the Danube in 1664

The Fort of Parkan (full name Ciğerdelen parkan meaning "liver-stabbing fort" in Turkish, shortened to Çekerden) was a fortified outpost built by the Ottoman Empire in 1546 on the northern banks of the Danube opposite the city of Esztergom. It lost its military role after the Great Turkish War and was soon demolished. The fort was located on the territory of present-day Štúrovo, Slovakia.

== History ==
The Ottomans built a small fortress (parkan) near the destroyed medieval village of Kakath as part of the defense system of Esztergom shortly after they captured the city in 1543. The natural crossing of the Danube near the mouth of the Hron had a strategic role, and the outpost provided a safe base for Ottoman raiders sent north into the Habsburg Kingdom of Hungary.

The construction of the new fort was reported by Pál Várdai, the Archbishop of Strigonium, in his letter to the seven mining towns of Lower Hungary on September 22, 1546: "You know how dangerous this region is, especially opposite Strigonium, due to the new castle being built very close by." The construction of the outpost was probably completed that year or the next.

The fort was modest in size. The number of garrison troops was recorded in the Ottoman pay lists (mevacib defterleri). The first one in 1549-50 listed 59 regular soldiers (müstahfıza) and two officers; the commandant (dizdar) was Kurd bin Yusuf. In 1558 the garrison was still commanded by the same dizdar, and consisted of 67 soldiers and two officers but this force was supplemented by 242 azebs (light infantry soldiers). In 1568-69 the number of garrison troops decreased to 241 (72 regular soldiers, 124 azebs and 45 martolos ie. Christian irregulars).

In 1586-87 the garrison was commanded by Skender dizdar; the troops consisted regular soldiers (20 müstahfıza and two officers), artillerymen (8 topçi and one aga), azebs (115 soldiers and 5 officers) and martolos (25-30 Turkish and Serb soldiers and two officers). Although the garrison was not large in number, the presence of artillerymen suggests that the fort had been provided with cannons by the 1580s. A caretaker (kayyım), a muezzin and a teacher (maarif) were also listed which shows that the parkan had a mosque at this time.

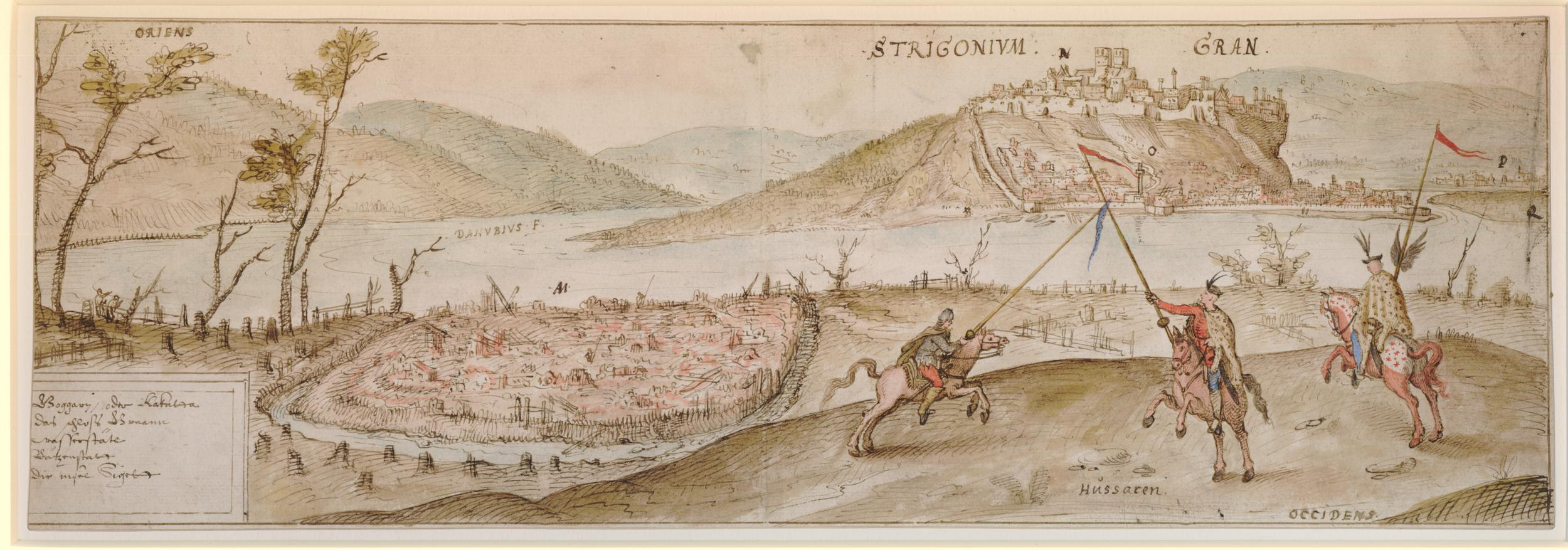
Strigonium with the ruins of Kakath (Parkan) in 1595 on a drawing by Jacob Hoefnagel

The area north of the Danube was a contested borderland between the two empires even after the Treaty of Adrianople theoretically established peace in 1568. During raids, the Ottomans regularly clashed with the soldiers of the nearest Hungarian border fortress, Újvár. Such clashes were recorded, among others, in 1557 and 1570. A more serious incident took place in the spring of 1582, when Ottoman raiders drove away many cattle from near Újvár. In revenge, captain of the fortress, Pál Rácz, launched a raid against Parkan, slaughtered several Turks there, and drove the herd off from the meadows. The Ottomans tried in vain to prevent this with cannonade from Estergon. Another, much less successful raid, led by György Thurzó in 1590, probably also affected the area around Parkan; during this raid many Hungarian border fortress soldiers from Újvár lost their lives.

The period of relative calm ended when the Long Turkish War broke out. The Danube region became one of the main battlegrounds because the Ottomans hoped to capture Győr and Újvár, while the Christians wanted to open the way towards Buda by recapturing Gran. In May 1594, the main Habsburg army, led by Archduke Matthias, besieged the city. However, the siege, which lasted until the end of June, ended without success; the Çekerden fort remained in Ottoman hands throughout.

== Architecture ==
The 16th-century outpost was a rectangular wooden fortress on the north bank of the Danube. Its original appearance can be inferred from a drawing made by Jacob Hoefnagel who must have visited the area in 1595 after Gran was recaptured by the Habsburg army. The fort was completely destroyed in the siege but it can be seen that it was surrounded on three sides by a moat filled from the Danube, and there were buildings inside, of which Hoefnagel could only see their ruins. The main defensive structure was a simple palisade without towers.
