= Štúrovo =

Štúrovo Párkány
- Town
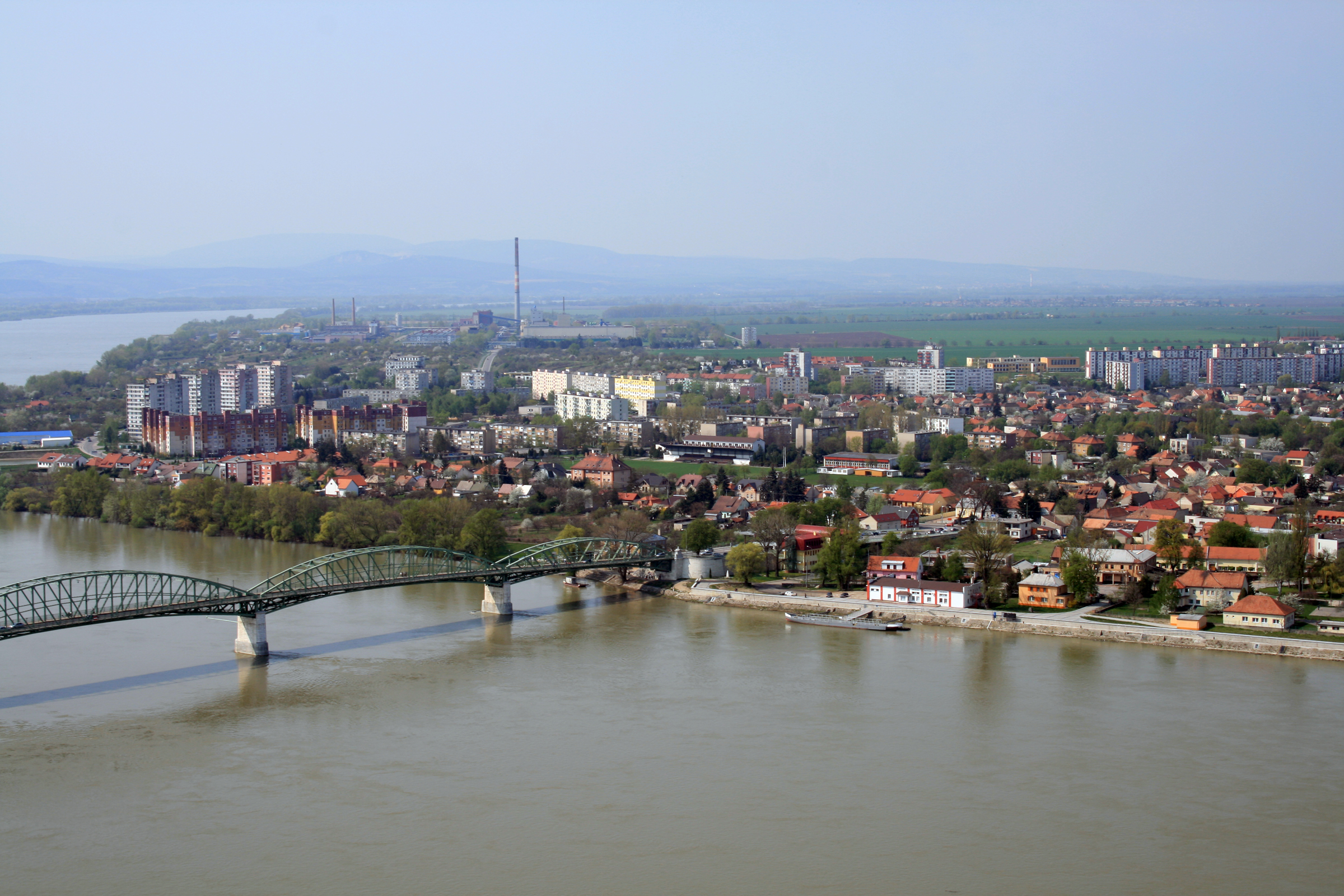
- View over the Danube from Esztergom

- Flag Coat of arms
- Etymology: Slovak: Ľudovít Štúr (Slovak writer, politician), Middle High German: Parkan ("fortified outpost")
- Location of Štúrovo in Slovakia Štúrovo (Slovakia)
- Coordinates: 47°47′57″N 18°43′05″E
- Country: Slovakia
- Region: Nitra Region
- District: Nové Zámky
- First mentioned: 1075
- Market town: 1724

Government
  - Mayor: Jenő Szabó

Area
  - Total: 37.22 km^{2} (14.37 sq mi)
- (2022)
- Elevation: 109 m (358 ft)

Population (2025)
  - Total: 9,221
- Time zone: UTC+1 (CET)
  - Summer (DST): UTC+2 (CEST)
- Postal code: 943 01
- Area code: +421 36
- Vehicle registration plate (until 2022): NZ
- Website: www.sturovo.sk

Štúrovo is the southernmost town of Slovakia, situated on the river Danube not far from the mouth of the Hron. Connected by the Mária Valéria Bridge it forms a cross-border urban area with the city of Esztergom in Hungary. In 2023 the town had a population of 9,361, two-thirds of whom belong to the Hungarian minority. Administratively, it is part of the Nitra Region and the Nové Zámky District.

Štúrovo / Párkány is a popular summer holiday destination with the Vadas Thermal Resort, the biggest aquapark in Slovakia. It is also an industrial and commercial center of local importance with lively cross-border traffic, an industrial park, railway junction, hotels, casinos, supermarkets and the annual Fair of Saints Simon and Jude.

== Geography ==
The municipality lies at an altitude of 109 metres (358 ft) and covers an area of 37.22 km^{2} (14.37 sq mi) (2025).

== Names and etymology ==
The oldest name of the settlement was Kokot, the common Slavic word for rooster (the word still exists in Slovak but as a vulgarism). It was mentioned as Kokot in 1075, Cokot in 1157, Chokot in 1209, Kokat in 1215 and Kakath 1276. The word entered Hungarian as "kakas" and is still in use.

Parkan originally meant a "fortified outpost" in Middle High German, and entered Hungarian as "párkány" (although its meaning later changed to "ledge"). In 1546 a small fort was built by the Ottomans and called Ciğerdelen parkan meaning "liver-stabbing fort" or Çekerden. In the early modern period Kakath/Kakad and Párkány remained in parallel use but over time Párkány became the dominant name (Kakad was last attested in 1732). A German name was also recorded in 1595 as Gockern.

Párkány was the official name of the town when it was part of the Kingdom of Hungary in the 18th-20th centuries. It is still in use as Hungarian remains a recognized minority language in the municipality.

The original Slovak name was also Parkan. It was in official use from 1920 to 1938, and between 1945 and 1948. The town was renamed in 1948 after Ľudovít Štúr, a prominent figure of the Slovak national revival. There was an attempt to return to the old official name in a local referendum in 1991; however the government refused to accept the decision.

== Symbols ==
The main symbols of the town are the coat of arms and the flag.

The coat of arms of the town was created by a local historian, Péter Püspöki Nagy, and adopted by the municipal council in 1971. The main charge refers to the medieval name of the town, Kakath ("kakas" meaning rooster in Hungarian), the chaussé evokes the triangular Ottoman fortress of Parkan in the early modern period, the azure field refers to the Danube and Hron (Garam) rivers.

The blazon of the arms:

Azure, chaussé Or displayed a cock's head facing sinister erased Gules.

The flag of the town is a swallowtail with a red side and seven blue and gold stripes.

== History ==
=== Prehistory ===
The area of Štúrovo has been inhabited since prehistoric times. On the natural plateau above the river to the southwest of the town a large Neolithic settlement was discovered by Juraj Pavúk during rescue excavations in 1965-67 when the South-Slovakian Pulp and Paper Mill (JCP Stúrovo) was constructed. Excavations uncovered a main area of approximately 140 by 120 meters, with longhouses distributed across it. A further excavated area suggested a minimum overall west-east extent of about 200 meters, with the excavator proposing a settlement area of up to 500 meters along the Danube. Ten building phases were identified, ranging from the developed Linear Pottery culture (LBK) to the Želiezovce phase, suggesting a more or less continuous occupation. A total of 31 longhouses were excavated, ranging from 14 m to 37 m in length. The site also provided a large assemblage of animal bones, indicating a diet dominated by domesticates such as cattle, sheep/goats, and pigs. Carbonised cereals were preserved in pits, with emmer dominant, and einkorn and spelt also present. There was a large house (Großbau) in three of the settlement phases that was probably used as communal grain store and animal stall. Chalcolithic finds of the Boleráz group were also recovered from this location.

In the Roman era the land on the left bank of the Danube was part of the Pannonian Limes. A settlement named Anavum in Ptolemy's Geography (in Greek ἄναυό) can be located hypothetically near the mouth of the Hron by using Ptolemy's coordinates. So far no Roman remains have been found in this area.

Archaeological finds prove the existence of a Germanic settlement in the Roman and Migration period. A rescue excavation was carried out in 1956-1957 in the former military training ground (Vojenské cvičisko) to the north of present-day Štúrovo. In total 66 structures were unearthed including 12 huts. The settlement was inhabited in the Early Roman Period and later again in the Late Roman and Early Migration Periods (between years 310/320 and 420/430 AD). At the time this area was populated by the Quadi people. The village consisted of sunken huts with hexagonal or rectangular post construction, and also structures on the ground level. The inhabitants mostly used Germanic pottery and kept domestic animals (cattle, goat, sheep, pig, horse, dog, cat and chicken). Among the unearthed bones cattle farming was best represented. Pottery imported from Pannonia attest commercial relations with the Romans across the Danube. A bronze coin of Claudius Gothicus was also found. The Quadic settlements in Štúrovo and the lower Hron basin vanished during the first decades of the fifth century when the tribes left their homeland.

There was an Avar-Slavic burial ground in the same area with 280 graves, dating from the 7th and 8th centuries. Among the findings, ten were identified as horsemen graves, along with several others that also belonged to the Avar warrior class. The majority of the other graves were attributed to the Slavic population, based on their construction and accompanying artifacts. The finds show the integration and cultural assimilation between the Avars and Slavs within the Avar Khaganate, making it challenging to distinguish between the two groups archaeologically. The primary occupation for the population appears to have been agriculture.

=== Medieval Kakath ===
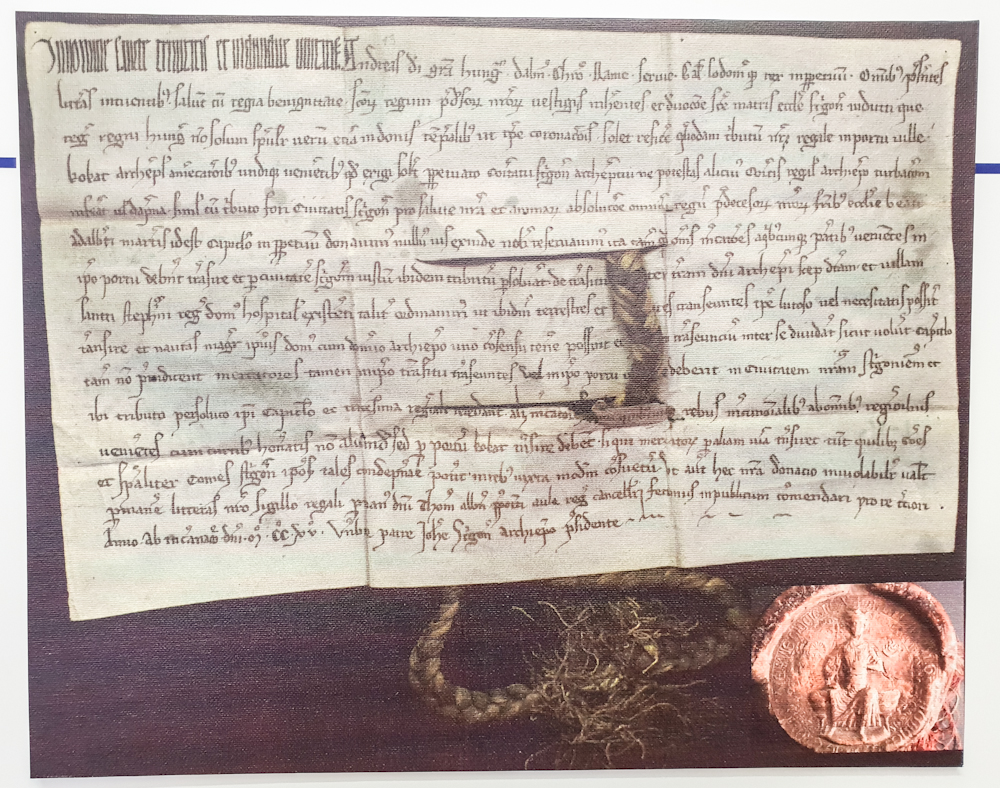
Document of Andrew II of Hungary mentioning Kokat from 1215 (copy)

From the 10th century Gran / Strigonium (Esztergom) became the royal and ecclesiastical capital of the Kingdom of Hungary. A village developed on the opposite bank of the river that was first mentioned in the charter of the Monastery of Saint Benedict (now Hronský Beňadik) in 1075 ("in Kokot a possession of 10 fishermen's houses in the upper parts and 3 plowgate of land"). The settlement was regularly mentioned in medieval documents, most often in the form of Kakath from the 13th century onwards. It owed its significance to the proximity of the royal city and a natural crossing on the Danube. The ferry point was part of an important trade route that connected the center of the Hungarian kingdom with its northern territories and the Kingdom of Bohemia. In 1215 the ferry toll was granted to the Chapter of Strigonium by King Andrew II of Hungary. In February 1274 King Ladislaus IV of Hungary was staying in Kakath (referred to as villa Kokat) when the chapter asked for his help in a property dispute.

In the Middle Ages Kakath was owned by the Archbishopric of Gran except the small tract of the Benedictine monastery. However, this was seized by the archdiocese in 1276 and never returned, although the monks continued to litigate over it until the 16th century. During the struggle for the Hungarian crown in the first decade of the 14th century, King Wenceslaus II of Bohemia led a campaign in 1304 to Hungary to strengthen the position of his son, King Wenceslaus. He set up his camp at the port of Kokoth in July, then crossing the Danube he attacked Strigonium because Archbishop Michael was a prominent supporter of his son's rival, King Charles I.

From the 1520s onwards, Kakath was severely affected by the Hungarian–Ottoman Wars. On Tabula Hungariae, the oldest printed map of Hungary, the town itself was not depicted but the location was inside the area that was indicated as plundered by the Ottomans after the Battle of Mohács in 1526. The town was probably ravaged again during Suleiman I's campaign of 1529. The tax register of the archbishopric in 1531 recorded only 11 houses and 10 ferrymen, a significant decrease from the previous years. Strigonium itself was besieged and captured by the Ottomans in 1543. By that time, the medieval market town had been destroyed by the devastating conflict: according to the tax register of that year, Kakath was completely abandoned.

The exact location of the medieval settlement is still not known but rescue excavations in 2009 uncovered the edge of a large cemetery between today's Sobieskeho ulica and the Vadaš Thermal Complex in which at least several dozen people were buried. It was tentatively identified as the cemetery of Kakath.

=== Ottoman Parkan ===
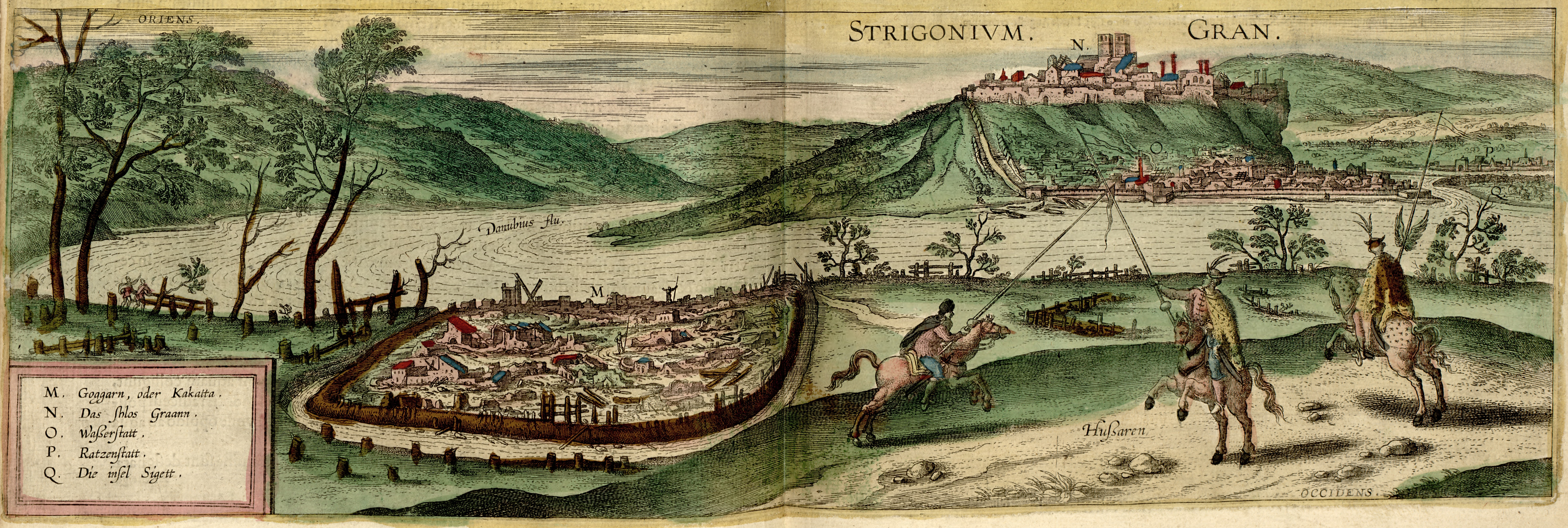
View of the ruins of Kakath (Parkan) with Gran in the background in 1595 (engraving after a drawing by Jacob Hoefnagel)

The Ottomans soon built a fortified outpost (parkan) on the left bank of the Danube, opposite Gran (now called Estergon). The construction of the new fort was reported by Pál Várdai, Archbishop of Gran, in his letter to the seven mining towns of Lower Hungary on September 22, 1546: "You know how dangerous this region is, especially opposite Strigonium, due to the new castle being built very close by." The construction of the outpost was probably completed that year or the next. It was named by the Ottomans Ciğerdelen parkan meaning "liver-stabbing fort".

The Archbishopric of Strigonium still tried to collect income from the villages north of the Danube in the following decades, therefore it appointed stewards to Kakath, but it was unable to tax the outpost itself which was firmly in Ottoman hands. The fortress was modest in size and the garrison consisted of regular troops (müstahfıza), azebs and Christian irregulars (martolos). The presence of artillerymen in 1586 suggests that the fort had cannons at that time and a mosque had been built.

The parkan was part of the defense system of Estergon which was now located in the heavily contested border zone between the Kingdom of Hungary and the Ottoman Empire. The outpost also provided a safe base for the Ottoman raiders sent north of the Danube. These troops regularly clashed with the soldiers of the nearest Hungarian border fortress, Újvár even after the Treaty of Adrianople theoretically established peace in 1568. During a successful counter-raid in 1582, the Hungarians drove the Turkish herd off from the meadows near Parkan.

However, there were also attempts of cooperation. Sokoloviç Memi, the Sanjak-bey of Estergon wrote a letter to the captain-general of Újvár, Miklós Pálffy, on March 20, 1589, in which he suggested that weekly and annual fairs be held again in Kakath. This would benefit the people of the region, he wrote, and he suggested that Pálffy determine the dates of the fairs. The letter reveals that the bey was primarily thinking of large cattle fairs, where traders could have come from cities as far away as Vienna, Prague or Pressburg. The safety of the fairs would have been guaranteed by the bey.

Many attempts to retake the fortress from the Turks followed, but they were unsuccessful except 1595–1605 period, until 1683, when the Turks lost a battle near Párkány.

=== Párkány in the Kingdom of Hungary ===
During the reign of Maria Theresa, the town regained its rights and became a district town.

In 1850, Párkány became a station on the railway between Pressburg (Hungarian: Pozsony, now Bratislava) and Budapest. In 1895, the Mária Valéria bridge to Esztergom was opened.

After World War I, the town became a border town of Czechoslovakia. In 1938, as a result of the First Vienna Award, Párkány and parts of Southern Slovakia were occupied by Hungary. It was liberated in the years 1944/1945 by Soviet troops. The Mária Valéria bridge was destroyed for a second time (first time in 1920) by retreating German forces.

After World War II, with the annulment of the Vienna Awards, the town became a part of Czechoslovakia again. It was renamed to Štúrovo in 1948. The formerly independent villages of Nána and Obid were merged with the town in 1960 and 1972 respectively. Štúrovo ceased to be the seat of a separate district in 1960 and was merged into the new larger Nové Zámky District.

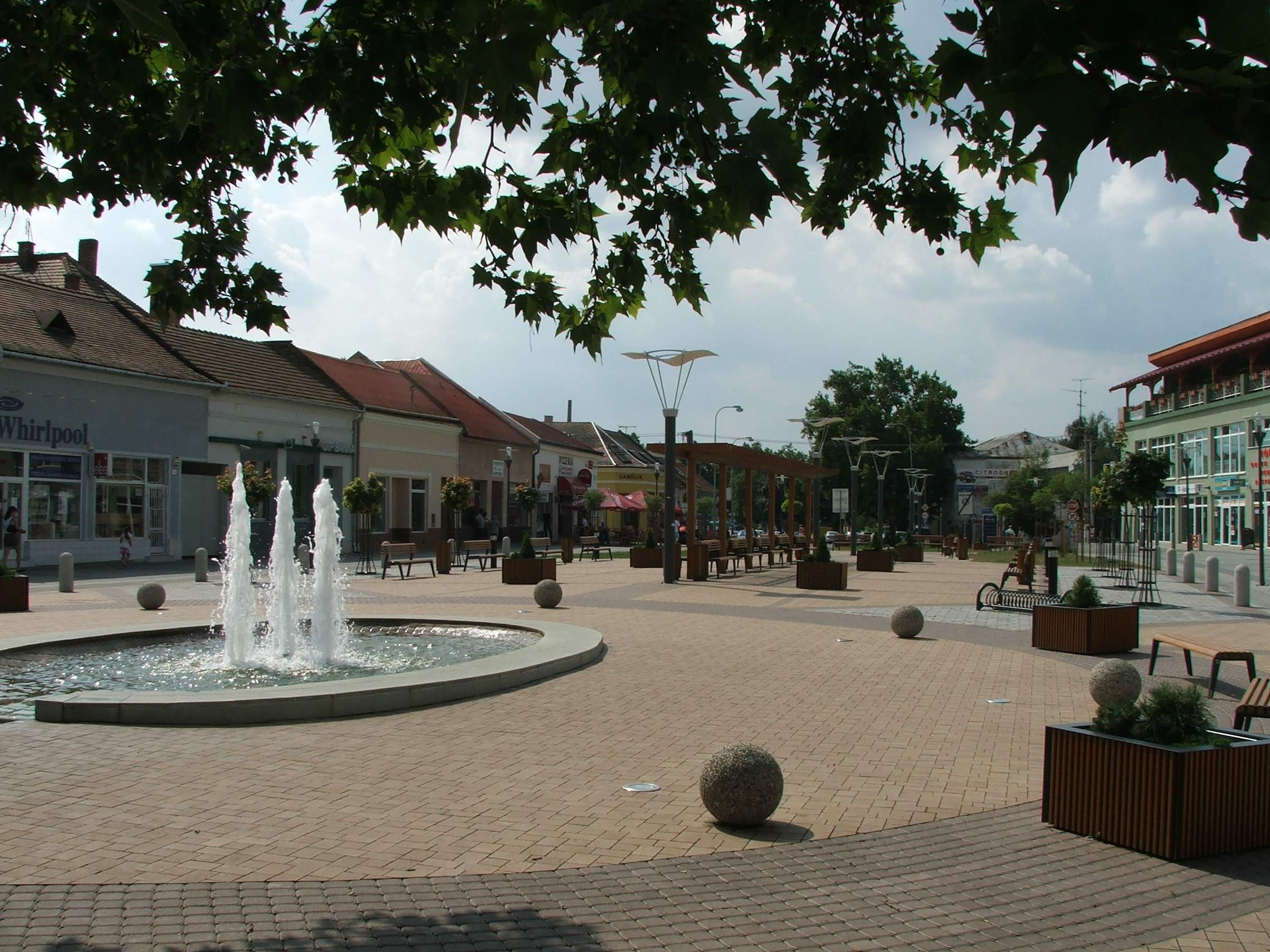
Pedestrian zone in Štúrovo

The postwar industrialisation period saw a major pulp and paper processing plant opened - the Juhoslovenské celulózky a papierne (South Slovakian Pulpwood and Paper Works) in 1968, employing some 4,000 people. A new thermal swimming resort Vadaš was built in 1978. The local railway station became the second largest in Slovakia (1975).

After the Velvet Revolution, Nána (1990) and Obid (1998) became separate villages again. The Mária Valéria bridge to Hungary was rebuilt for the third time and opened in 2001, boosting the local economy.

== Border crossing ==
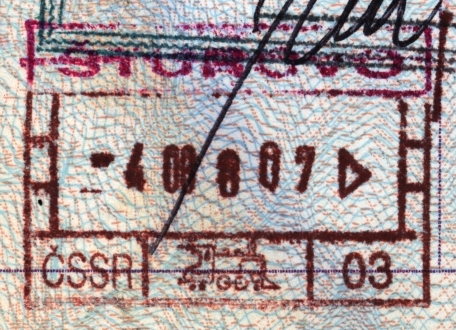
Czechoslovak passport stamp from Štúrovo (1988).

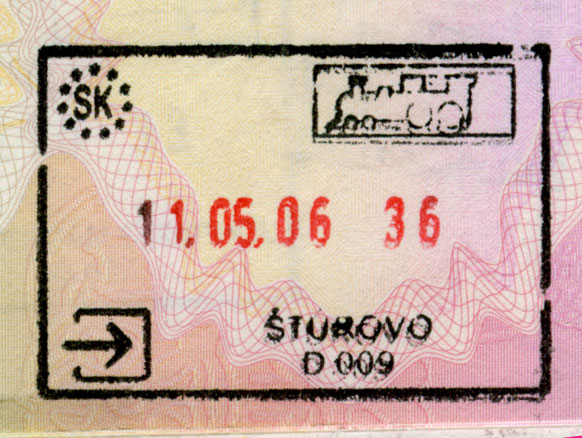
Pre-Schengen passport stamp from Štúrovo.

Until 21 December 2007 when both Slovakia and Hungary became part of the Schengen Area, Štúrovo was a major border crossing between Slovakia and Hungary, with Esztergom located on the Hungarian side of the River Danube. The two cities are linked by the Mária Valéria Bridge. The road bridge is some 500 metres (1,600 feet) in length and is named after Archduchess Marie Valerie of Austria, (1868–1924), the fourth child of Emperor Franz Josef, and Elisabeth.

The bridge was originally opened on 28 September 1895 but was destroyed twice. On 22 July 1919 the bridge was destroyed by a detonation at its first pier on its western side but the bridge was renovated in 1922 and completely reconstructed in 1926. During World War II, retreating German troops blew up the bridge on 26 December 1944 along with other bridges near Esztergom.

Decades of intransigence between the Communist governments of Hungary and Czechoslovakia meant that the bridge was not rebuilt until the new millennium, finally reopening on 11 October 2001. Half the costs of the project were covered by a 10 million Euro grant from the European Union, as part of the EU PHARE project to assist applicant countries in their preparations to join the EU.

Štúrovo is also a major railway border crossing between Slovakia and Hungary as it is on the main Bratislava-Budapest railway line. The main station across the border in Hungary is Szob which is located to the east on the same side of the River Danube.

== Population ==
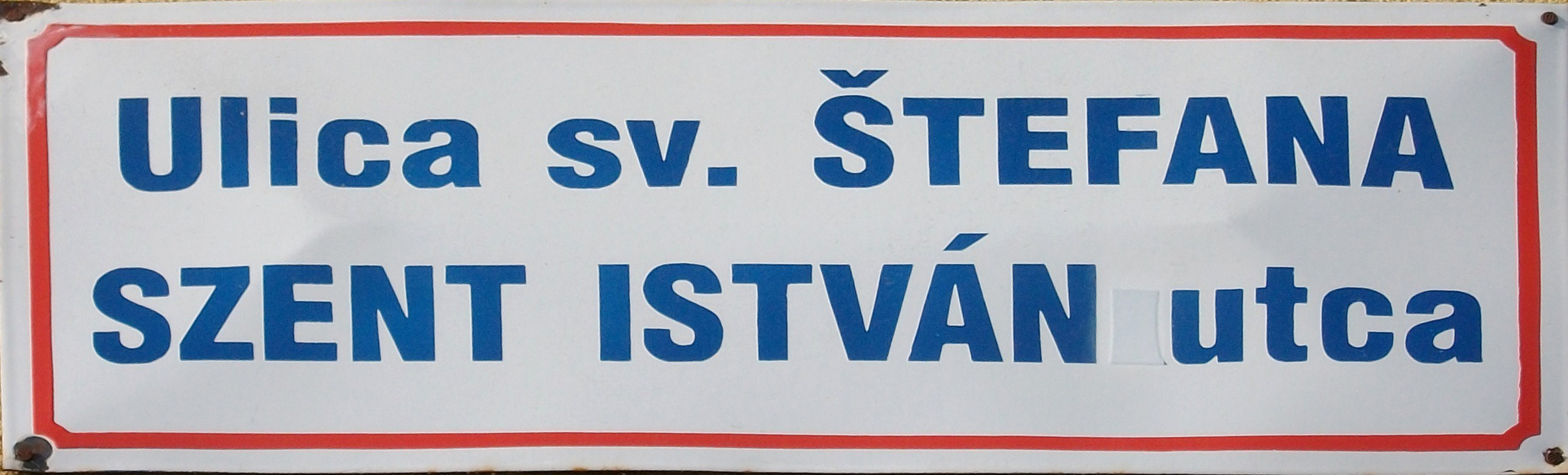
Bilingual (Slovak/Hungarian) street sign (Saint Stephen Street)

Historical population
Year	Pop.	±%
1970	7,051	—
1980	10,690	+51.6%
1991	12,146	+13.6%
2001	11,708	−3.6%
2011	10,919	−6.7%
2021	9,777	−10.5%
Source: Censuses

Population statistic (10 years)
Year	1995	2005	2015	2025
Count	13,497	11,122	10,524	9221
Difference		−17.59%	−5.37%	−12.38%

Population statistic
Year	2024	2025
Count	9322	9221
Difference		−1.08%

It has a population of 9221 people (31 December 2025).

=== Ethnicity ===
Census 2021 (1+%)
Ethnicity	Number	Fraction
Hungarian	6562	67.11%
Slovak	2919	29.85%
Not found out	771	7.88%
Czech	99	1.01%
Total	9777	

In year 2021 was 9777 people by ethnicity 6562 as Hungarian, 2919 as Slovak, 771 as Not found out, 99 as Czech, 28 as Romani, 26 as Other, 17 as Turkish, 12 as Russian, 12 as German, 7 as Polish, 6 as Jewish, 6 as Chinese, 4 as Rusyn, 3 as Moravian, 2 as Vietnamese, 2 as Ukrainian, 2 as French, 2 as English, 1 as Irish, 1 as Austrian, 1 as Croatian and 1 as Albanian.

Note on population: The difference values of population numbers in the table "Population statistic" and in the sections "Ethnicity" & "Religion" is caused by the use of various statistical methods.

=== Religion ===
Census 2021 (1+%)
Religion	Number	Fraction
Roman Catholic Church	5687	58.17%
None	2483	25.4%
Not found out	829	8.48%
Calvinist Church	405	4.14%
Evangelical Church	100	1.02%
Total	9777	

In year 2021 was 9777 people by religion 5687 from Roman Catholic Church, 2483 from None, 829 from Not found out, 405 from Calvinist Church, 100 from Evangelical Church, 54 from Greek Catholic Church, 50 from Christian Congregations in Slovakia, 37 from Other and not ascertained christian church, 33 from Jehovah's Witnesses, 24 from Islam, 16 from Other, 12 from Buddhism, 9 from Eastern Orthodox Church, 9 from Ad hoc movements, 7 from Jewish community, 6 from Paganism and natural spirituality, 5 from United Methodist Church, 5 from Baptists Church, 2 from Church of Jesus Christ of Latter-day Saints, 2 from Apostolic Church, 1 from Church of the Brethren and 1 from Bahá'i Community.

== Twin towns — sister cities ==
Štúrovo is twinned with:

- Esztergom, Hungary
- Bruntál, Czech Republic
- Castellarano, Italy
- Baraolt, Romania
- Novi Bečej, Serbia
- Kłobuck, Poland
- Kőbánya (Budapest), Hungary
