= Pererîta =

Pererita
- Village
- Location in Moldova
- Coordinates: 48°12′N 26°55′E
- Country: Moldova
- District: Briceni District

Population (2014 census)
  - Total: 1,670
- Time zone: UTC+2 (EET)
  - Summer (DST): UTC+3 (EEST)

Pererîta is a village in Briceni District, Moldova, located on the border with Romania.

== Notable people ==
- Grigore Vieru

== See also ==
- Battle of Pererîta
