= Siege of Kamenets (1687) =

Polish–Ottoman military engagement

- Part of Polish–Ottoman War (1683–1699), Great Turkish War
- Kamenets in 1684
Date	2 September 1687
Location	Kamianets-Podilskyi
Result	Ottoman–Crimean victory

Belligerents
Polish-Lithuanian Commonwealth; Cossack Hetmanate	Ottoman Empire; Crimean Khanate

Commanders and leaders
James Louis Sobieski; Stanisław Jan Jabłonowski; Andrzej Potocki; Andriy Mohyla	Huseyin Pasha

Strength
27,000 men	10,000

Casualties and losses
Unknown	Unknown

The siege of Kamenets was a military engagement by the Polish to seize the Ottoman fortress of Kamenets. The siege ended in failure.

== Siege ==
In July 1687, the Polish king, Jan III, dispatched an army of 27,000 men to recapture Kamenetes. He placed the army under the leadership of his eldest son, James. He placed the grand hetmans under the prince's command. Jan hoped his son would win and thus make his candidacy possible. The Polish army was supported by the Cossacks of hetman Andriy Mohyla. The Ottoman governor of Kamanetes, Huseyin Pasha, the Bosnian, heard of the large Polish army coming and reported the situation to Serdar Bozoklu Mustafa Pasha. The Polish army was poorly equipped, and the Hetmans preferred not to attack. James was not a military genius like his father. The Crimean Khan dispatched a force of 10,000 Ottoman-Crimean troops to relive the siege. The arrival of the relief army scattered the Polish troops and forced them to retreat, taking with them their baggage.

== Aftermath ==
In 1688, the Polish king dispatched another army of 18,000 men to capture Kamenetes. They failed and had to retreat. They were chased and attacked by the Crimeans on their territory, and they began ravaging Polish lands.

== Sources ==
- Gerda Hagenau (1918), Jan Sobieski: der Retter Wiens.
- Ahmet Şimşirgil (2014), Kayı 6: İmparatorluğun Zirvesi ve Dönüş.
- Caroline Finkel (2012), Osman's Dream.
