= Right-bank Ukraine =

Historical region in Ukraine

Right-bank Ukraine Правобережна Україна
- Historical region
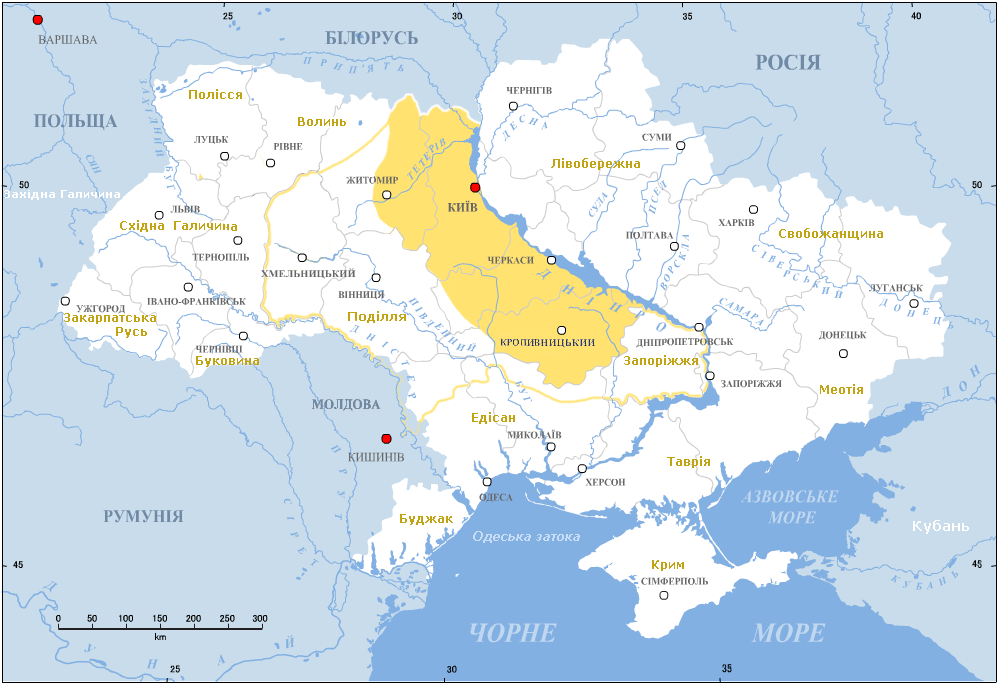
- Location on the map of Ukraine
- Country: Ukraine
- Largest city: Kyiv
- Time zone: UTC+2 (EET)
  - Summer (DST): UTC+3 (EEST)

The Right-bank Ukraine (Note: Ukrainian: Правобережна Україна, romanized: Pravoberezhna Ukrayina Russian: Правобережная Украина, romanized: Pravoberezhnaya Ukraina Polish: Prawobrzeżna Ukraina) or Pravoberezhzhia (Note: Ukrainian: Правобережжя, Ukrainian pronunciation: [prɐwobeˈrɛʒʲːɐ]) is a historical region in central Ukraine on the right (west) bank of the Dnieper River, corresponding to the modern-day oblasts of Vinnytsia, Zhytomyr, Kirovohrad, as well as the western parts of Kyiv and Cherkasy.

Geographically, Right-bank Ukraine is located in the central-western part of the Ukrainian Lisostep area. It is bordered by the historical regions of Volhynia and Podolia to the west, Zaporizhzhia to the south, left-bank Ukraine to the east, and Polesia to the north. It was separated from the Left bank and Zaporizhzhia during the Ruin.

Main cities of the region include Kyiv, Zhytomyr, Cherkasy and Bila Tserkva.

== History ==
Since the Middle Ages, the region formed part of the Khazar Khanate, Kievan Rus', Mongol Empire, Golden Horde, Grand Duchy of Lithuania and the Kingdom of Poland. Right-bank Ukraine was the target of slave raids by Tatars from the Black Sea steppes.

=== Split of Ukraine (1648–1667) ===
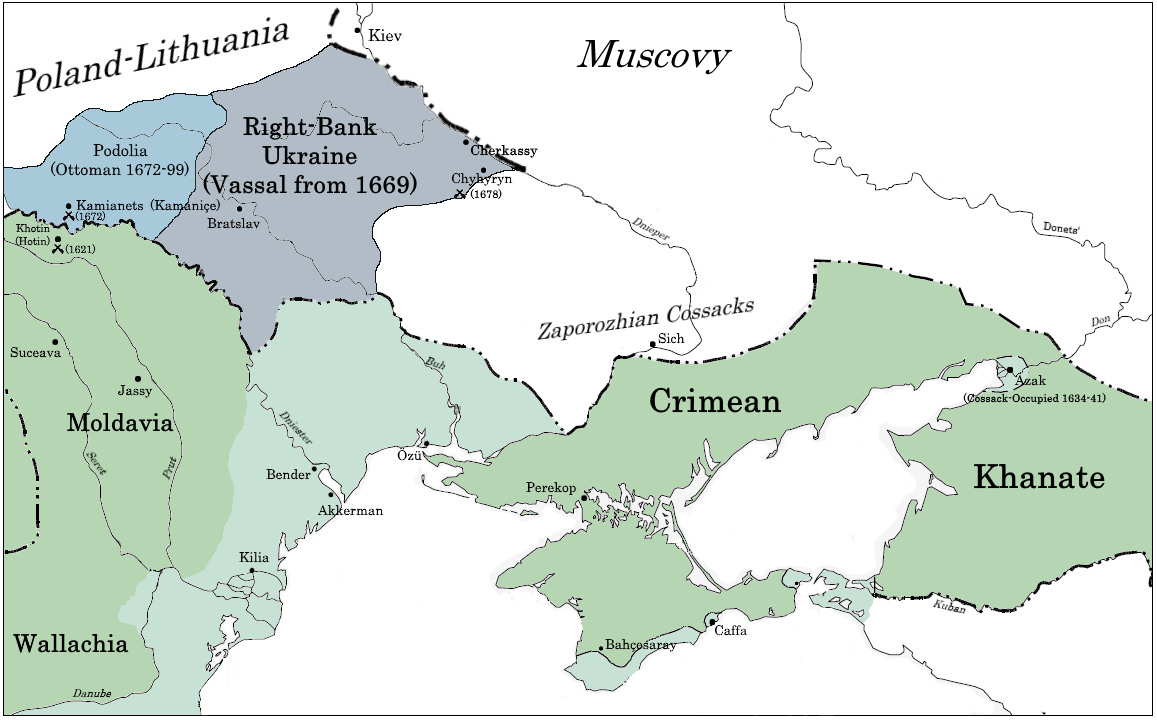
South right-bank Ukraine (bluish grey) as a vassal of the Ottoman Empire

The history of Right- and Left-bank Ukraine is closely associated with the Khmelnytsky Uprising of 1648–1657. The territory was part of the Polish–Lithuanian Commonwealth under the House of Vasa until the Russo-Polish War triggered by Khmelnytsky's Pereiaslav Agreement (1654), which established a tenuous alliance with Muscovy. After 13 years conflict, the Truce of Andrusovo was concluded in 1667 between the Commonwealth and Muscovy without involving the Cossacks, resulting in the compromise to split Ukraine along the river Dnipro. The east became part of the Left-bank Hetmanate along with the city of Kiev. Meanwhile, the west remained the Right-bank Hetmanate in the Commonwealth as part of the Lesser Poland Province and was divided into two voivodeships: Kyiv and Bratslav.

=== Ottoman expansion and Great Expulsion (1669–1682) ===
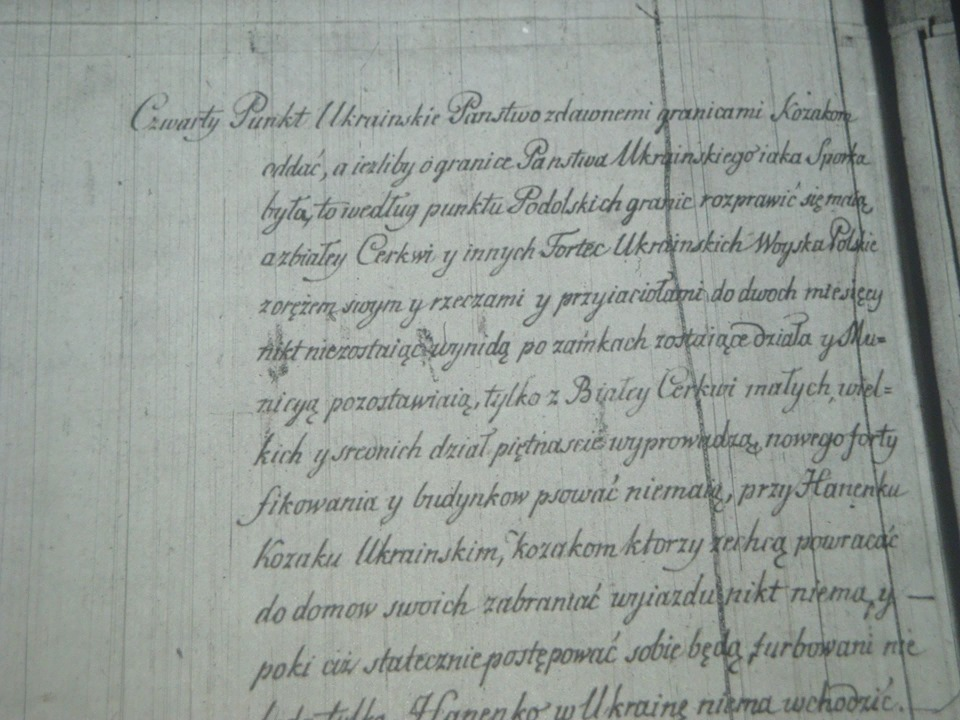
The mention of the "Ukrainian State" (Polish: Ukrainskie Panstwo) in the text of the Treaty of Buchach (1672) refers to the Right-bank Hetmanate.

In 1669, Hetman Petro Doroshenko transferred right-bank Ukraine under the sovereignty of the Ottoman Empire. The south of the Podolian Voivodeship in Right-bank Ukraine was invaded by the Ottomans in 1672. According to the Treaty of Buchach signed during the same year, the Bratslav voivodeship and the southern part of the Kyiv voivodeship stayed under Doroshenko's government, while the Podolia Eyalet became part of the Ottoman Empire.

In reaction, Muscovite forces and troops under Left-bank hetman Ivan Samoylovych conducted the Chyhyryn campaigns, leading to great upheaval known as the Great Expulsion (1674–1679), designed to forcibly resettle the population of Right-bank Ukraine to the Left Bank, and deprive Doroshenko and the Ottomans of income and recruitable soldiers. According to the 1681 Treaty of Bakhchisaray, the areas of Right-bank Ukraine between the Boh and Dnieper rivers were to remain uninhabited.

=== Restoration and Liquidation (1683–1699) ===
Following the 1683 victory of the Christian powers in the Battle of Vienna, the 1686 Treaty of Eternal Peace and the 1699 Treaty of Karlowitz returned those lands to the Commonwealth. The latter agreement also formally disbanded Cossack regiments in the area, although they de-facto continued to exist until 1714.

=== Haydamak rebellions (18th century) ===
During the 18th century, two Cossack uprisings took place in Right-bank Ukraine, including Koliivshchyna, a major haydamak rebellion that broke out in June 1768. In 1793 Right-bank Ukraine was annexed by the Russian Empire in the Second Partition of Poland,, and during the 19th century was known as Southwestern Krai, composed of the governorates of Kyiv, Volhynia and Podolia and ruled by the governor general in Kyiv.

=== 19th and 20th centuries ===
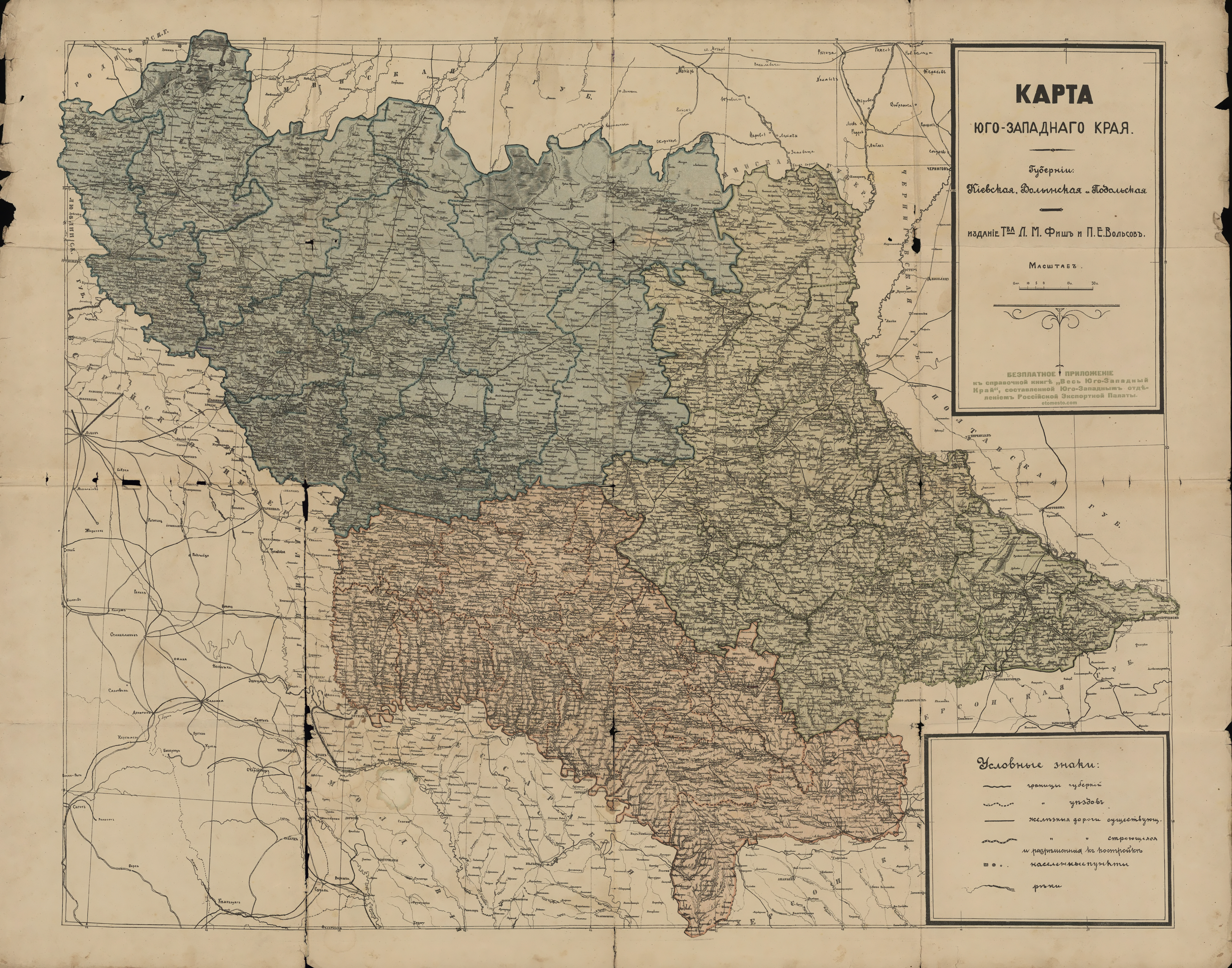
Map of the Southwestern Krai in 1913

In the 19th century, the population of right-bank Ukraine was mostly Ukrainian, but most of the land was owned by the Polish or Polonized Ukrainian nobility. Many of the towns and cities belonged to the Pale of Settlement and had a substantial Jewish population, while the Polish-speaking nobility was mostly Roman Catholic. Most of the peasantry became Greek Catholic only in the 18th century, and after the Partitions of Poland, largely converted to Orthodoxy long before the disestablishment of the Unia in 1839. The right-bank Ukraine was subsequently divided into four provinces (guberniyas), each with its own administration: Kiev, Volhynia, Kherson and Podolia.

In the Interwar era during the 1920s and 1930s, the term "Right-bank Ukraine" corresponded to the territory between the Dnieper and the Soviet-Polish border, including parts of the historical regions of Kyivshchyna, Volhynia and Podolia.

== Governors ==
=== Hetmans (1662–1699) ===
The hetman's capital was initially at Chyhyryn in the 1660s, but under pro-Commonwealth hetman Mykhailo Khanenko moved to Ostroh in the 1669. The pro-Ottoman hetman Doroshenko established the Ottoman Hetmanate's capital at Nemyriv in 1676, which the Commonwealth recaptured in 1678. In 1684, King John III Sobieski confirmed Nemyriv as the residence of the Acting Hetman of Right-bank Ukraine.

- 1662–1665: Pavlo Teteria
- 1665–1669: Petro Doroshenko
- 1669–1674: Mykhailo Khanenko
- 1675–1679: Ostap Hohol
- 1683–1684: Stefan Kunicki
- 1684–1689: Andriy Mohyla
- 1689–1692: Hryshko Ivanovych
- 1693–1699 (1704): Samiilo Samus

== Gallery ==
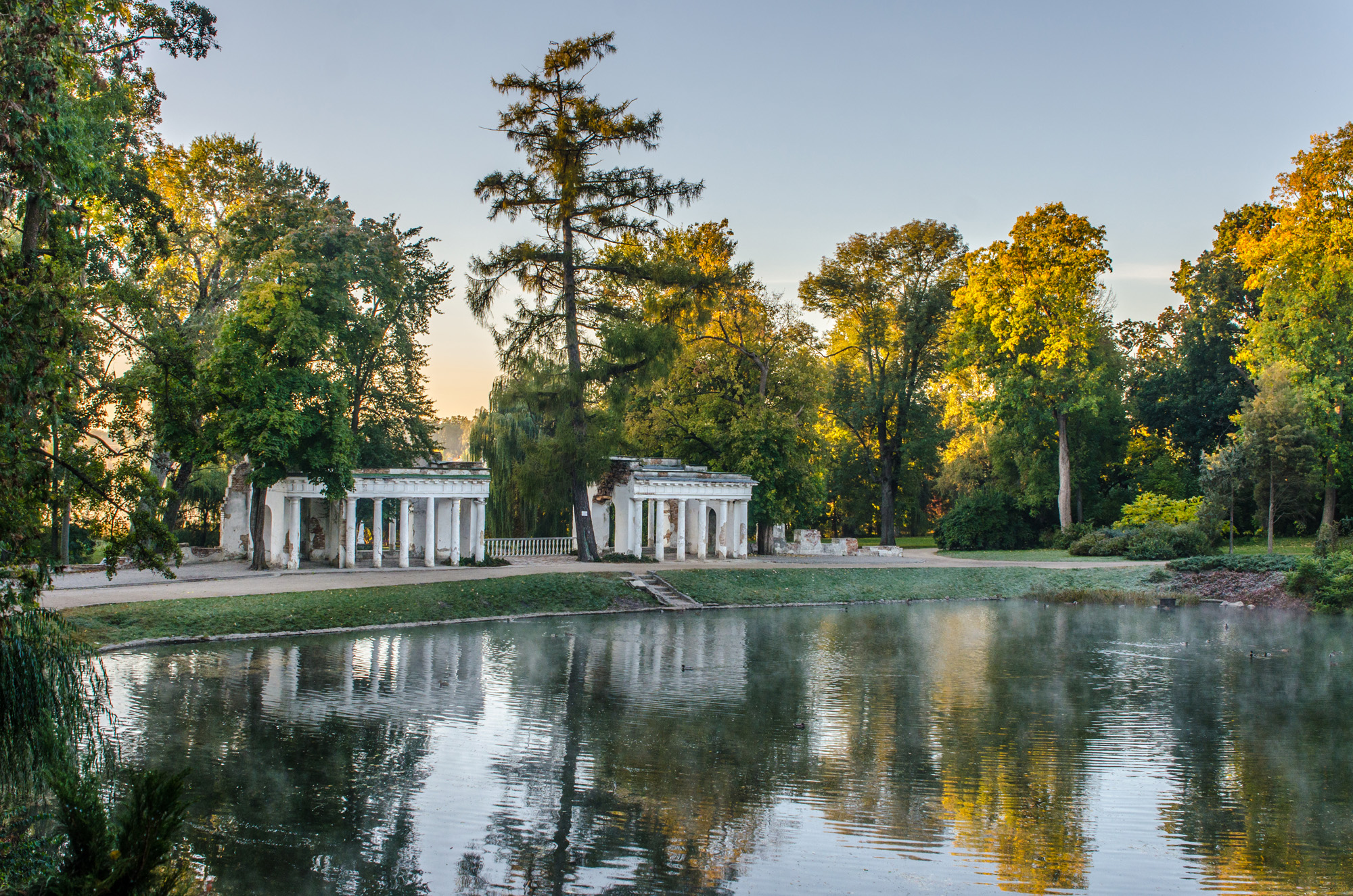
Arboretum Oleksandriya in Bila Tserkva

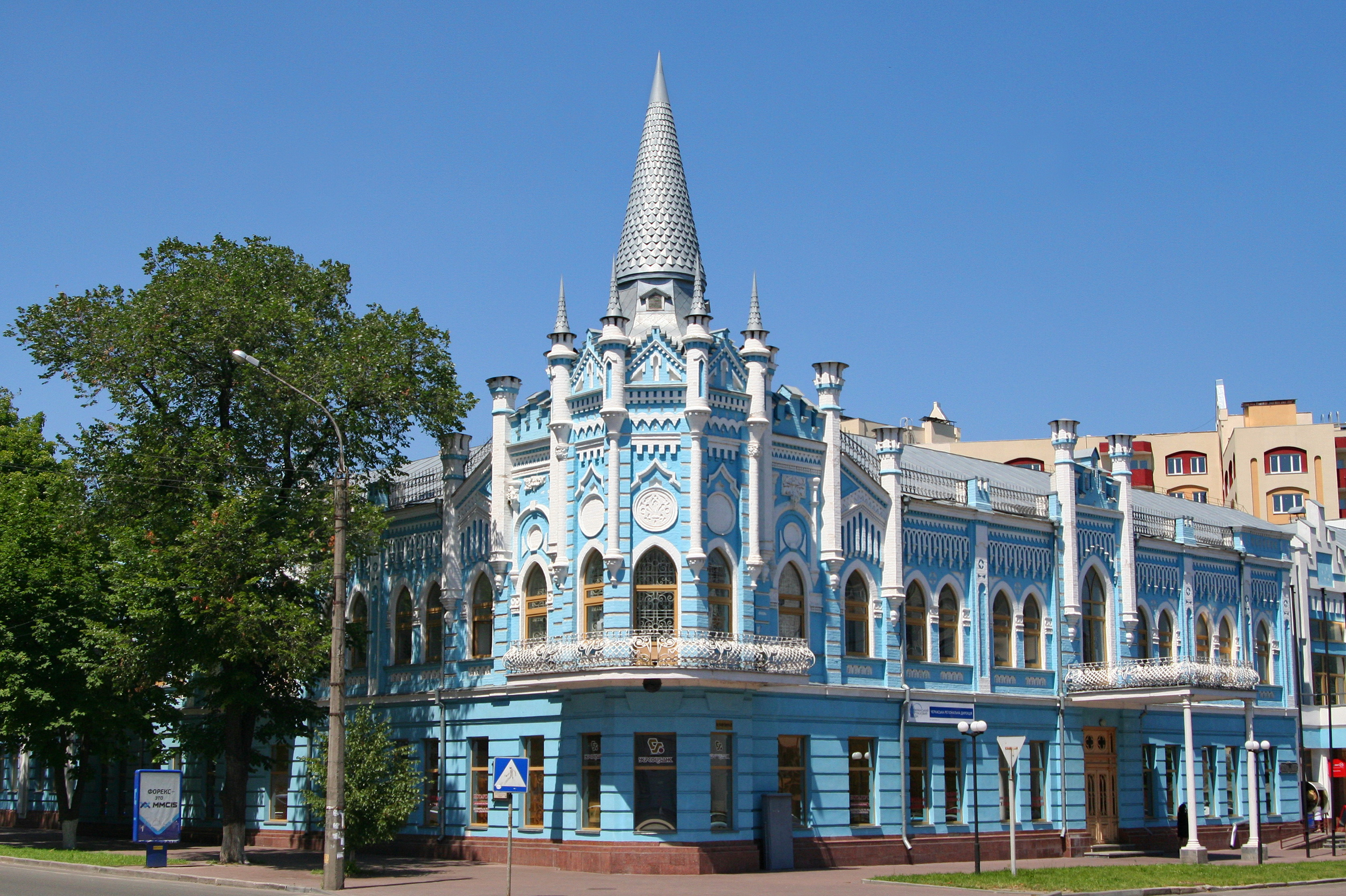
Blue Palace in Cherkasy

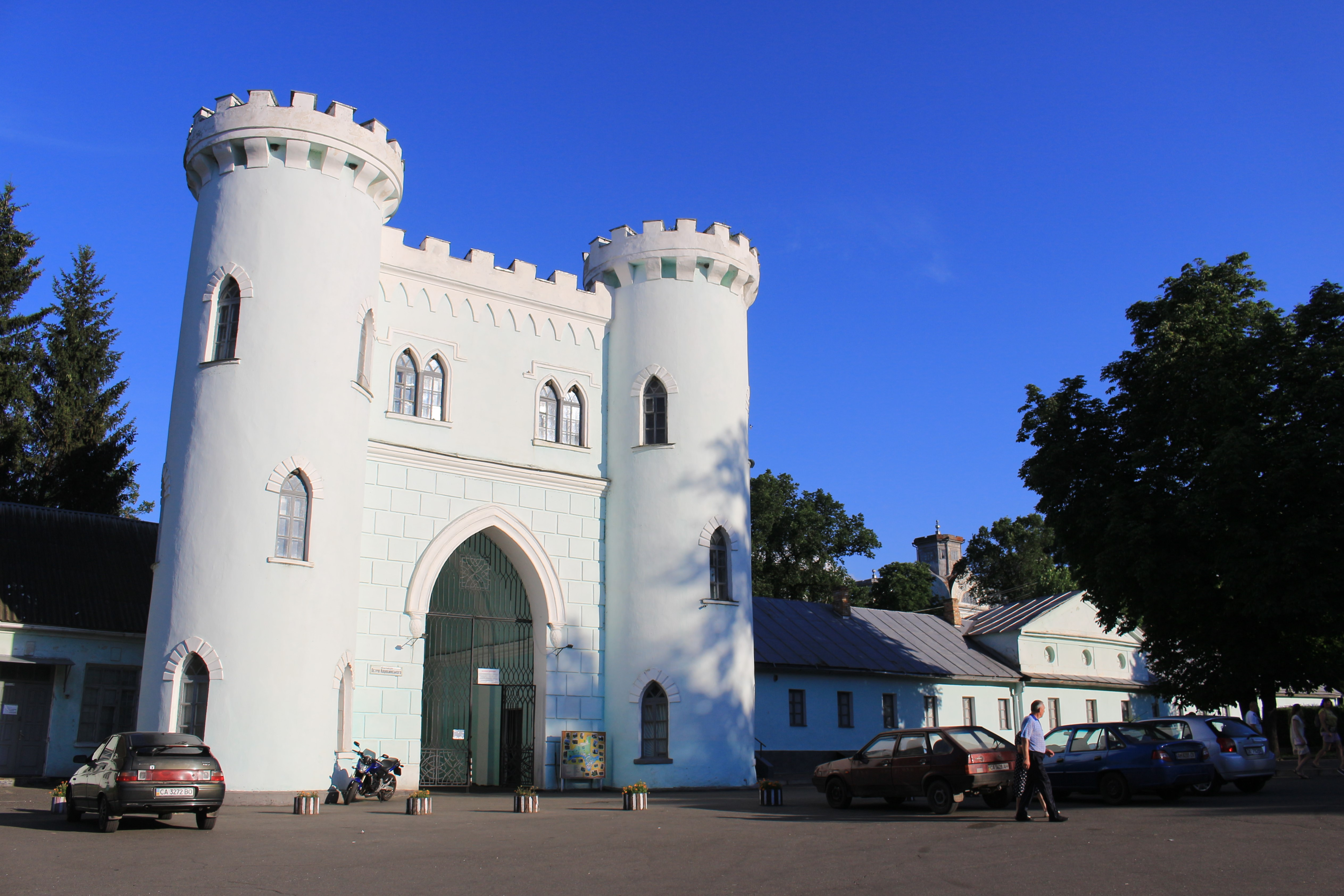
Palace Gate in Korsun-Shevchenkivskyi

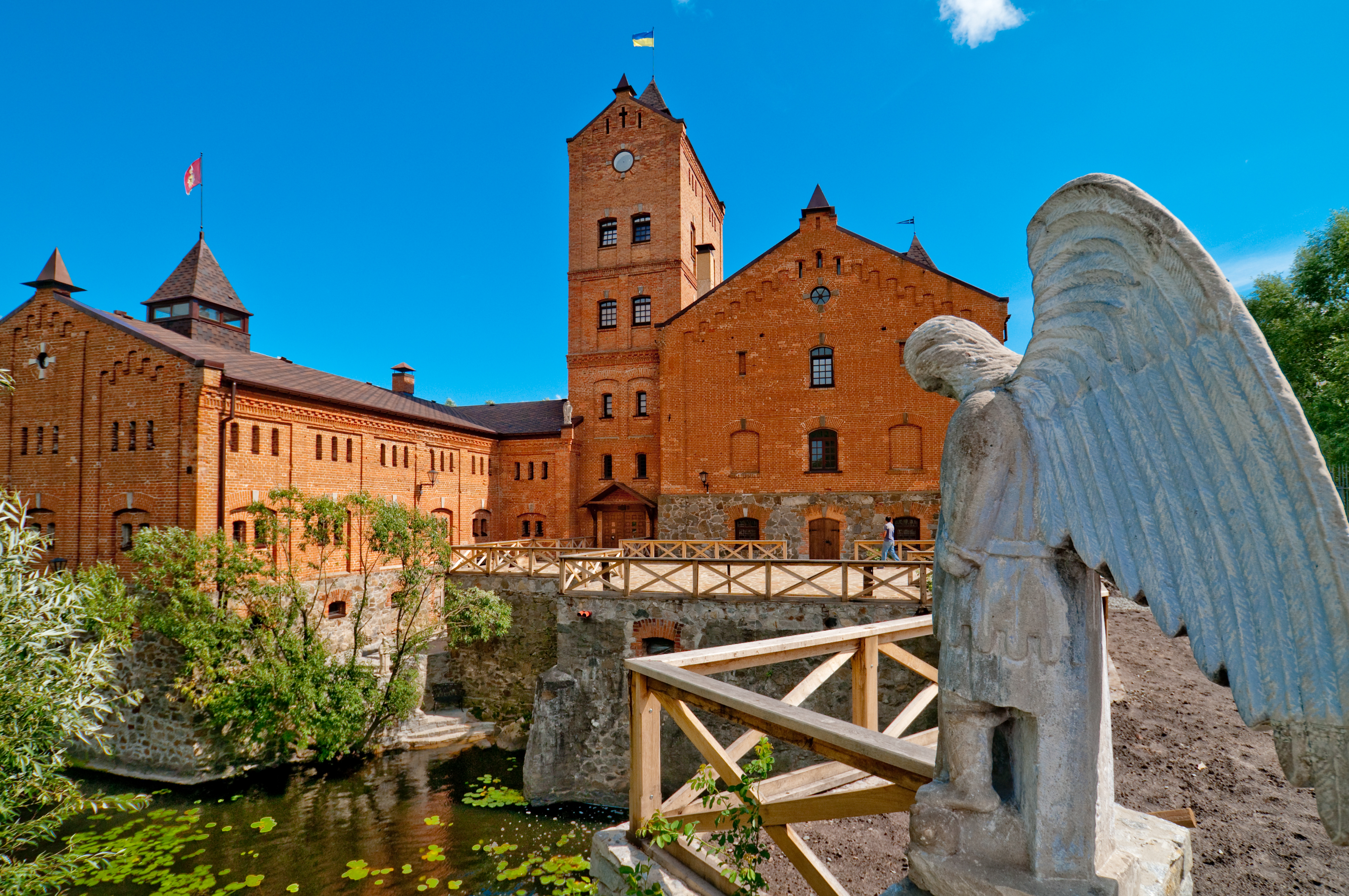
Radomysl Castle

== See also ==
- Wild Fields
- Southern Ukraine
- Western Ukraine
- Left-bank Ukraine

== Bibliography ==
- Yakovenko, Natalia (2006). An Outline History of Medieval and Early Modern Ukraine. Krytyka. pp. 393–398, 428. ISBN 9667679829.
- Magocsi, Paul Robert (1996). A History of Ukraine. University of Toronto Press. ISBN 0-8020-7820-6.
- Plokhy, Serhii (2022). The Gates of Europe: A History of Ukraine. New York, NY: Basic Books. p. 414. ISBN 978-0-465-07394-8.
- Tairova-Yakovleva, Tatiana (2020). Ivan Mazepa and the Russian Empire (PDF). Montreal Kingston London Chicago: McGill-Queen's Press. p. 425. ISBN 978-0-2280-0309-0.
