= Stefan Kunicki =

Ruthenian military commander and hetman

- Stephan Kunicki
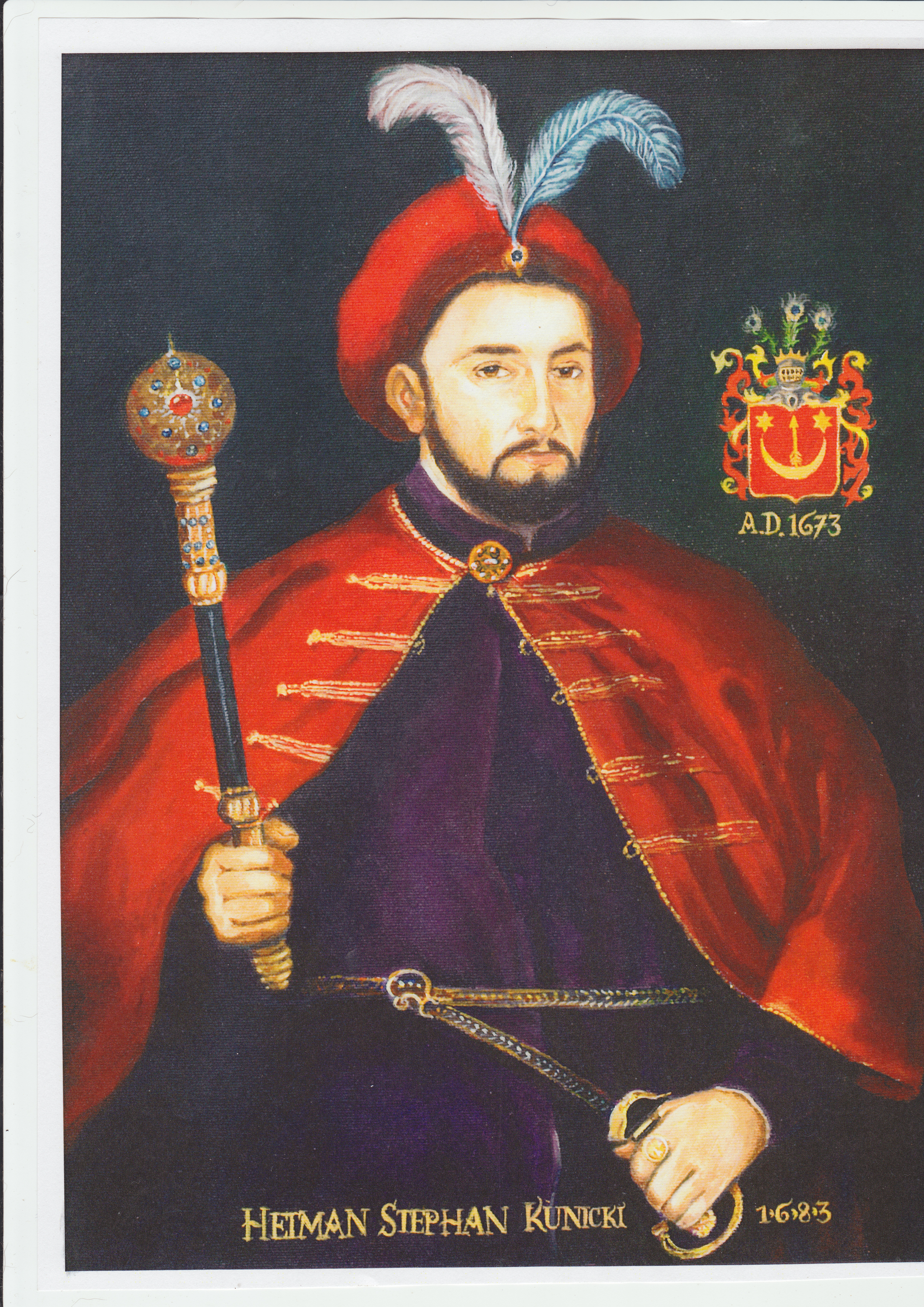

Hetman of Right-bank Ukraine
- In office 24 August 1683 – 1684
- Succeeded by: Andriy Mohyla

Personal details
- Born: circa 1640
- Died: 1684 Mohyliv, Ottoman Empire

Stefan Kunicki (Ukrainian: Стефан Куницький or Степан Куницький; c. 1640–1684) was a Ruthenian military commander and Cossack Hetman of Right-bank Ukraine. He was also a member of the Polish–Lithuanian Szlachta nobility.

== Biography ==
Kunicki's origin is unknown, also as his youth and beginning of military career. Before 1673 Kunicki became a collaborator of hetman Petro Doroshenko. In 1673 he was sent twice to Warsaw to the Polish king Michał Korybut Wiśniowiecki as an envoy of the Cossacks' hetman. On 25 February 1673 the sejm ennobled Kunicki, his five nephews (Atanazy, Wasyl, Fiedor, Dymitr, Iwan) and three more Cossacks who were loyal to the Polish–Lithuanian Commonwealth. When Kunicki was coming back from Warsaw to Czechryń (currently known as Chyhyryn), he was captured by the men of Ivan Samoylovych. Kunicki was detained until November 1674 when he was released after the intervention of the new Polish king Jan III Sobieski. In February 1675 Dymitr Jerzy Wiśniowiecki nominated him deputy starosta of Nemyriv. In spring 1676 he went to Moldavia to rescue his nephews and other relatives from Turkish captivity. As a podstarości he also worked in the field of the intelligence service. He collected information from Polish agents about the Turkish and Tatar armies for hetman Dymitr Jerzy Wiśniowiecki.

In the second half of 1676 the situation in Right-bank Ukraine changed. Petro Doroshenko was arrested by the Russians who nominated Ivan Samoylovych as his successor. This caused a reaction from Turkey. Yuri Khmelnytsky was released from Turkish prison and furnished with the title "prince of Rus". Turkey chose Nemyriv as a capital of Khanate of Ukraine. Nonetheless, Kunicki did not fear a Turkish or Tatar invasion of Nemyriv.

On 4 December 1678 colonel Hawryło Nehrebecki captured Nemyriv. It isn't known if Kunicki left town before the arrival of Nehrebecki or if he stayed for some time after 4 December. Neither is it known what he did between 1678 and 1683, though he may have spent some time in Volhynia at the property of Dymitr Jerzy Wiśniowiecki. He was married to Elena Kunitskaya.

== Kunicki's Campaign ==
In 1683, he invaded Moldavia, then advanced towards Akkerman. The Tatars knew of Kunicki's plan, so he decided to retreat and go back to Ukraine. On the Prut, Kunicki's army was overtaken by the Tatars. Kunicki escaped with his cavalry to Mohyliv. Andriy Mohyla, leader of the infantry, had to fight the Tatars alone but he successfully returned to Mohyliv. Mohyla's troops were very angry about Kunicki's behaviour and he was sentenced to death and executed. The infantry and cavalry proclaimed Mohyla as the new hetman.

== Bibliography ==
- Тарас Чухліб (2009). Куницький Стефан. Київ: Енциклопедія історії України, Інститут історії України НАН України. p. 560.
- Євген Онацький (1960). Куниця (Куницький) Степан (PDF). Українська мала енциклопедія. p. 792.
- Леонтій Войтович, Віктор Голубко (2019). Історія війн і військового мистецтва. У трьох томах. Том 2 (початок ХVІ – початок ХХ ст.). Фоліо. p. 976. ISBN 978-966-03-8350-0.
- Rawita-Gawroński, Franciszek (1919). Ostatni Chmielniczenko (Zarys monograficzny) 1640–1679 (in Polish). Poznań: "Ostoja" Spółka Wydawnicza. pp. 138–139.
- Rolle, Antoni (1880). Zameczki podolskie na kresach multańskich (in Polish). Vol. 3. Kraków: Gebethner i Wolff. pp. 208–209.
- Wagner Marek (2005). "Materiały do biografii hetmana kozackiego Stefana Kunickiego z lat 1676–1677" (PDF). Wschodni Rocznik Humanistyczny (in Polish). 2. Radzyńskie Stowarzyszenie Inicjatyw Lokalnych: 385–393.
- Wdowiszewski Zygmunt (1987). "Regesty nobilitacji w Polsce (1404–1794)". Materiały do biografii, genealogii i heraldyki polskiej (in Polish). 9: 89.
