= Registered Cossacks =

16-17th century Polish–Lithuanian Cossack units

Zaporizhian Host
- Seal of the Hetman of the Registered Cossacks (formally named "Zaporizhian Host") in 1595.
- Active: 1572–1699
- Country: Polish–Lithuanian Commonwealth
- Allegiance: Polish–Lithuanian Commonwealth
- Branch: Army
- Type: Light cavalry Skirmisher
- Role: Patrolling; Raiding; Reconnaissance; Screening; Shock tactics Wagon fort
- Size: up to 40,000 (1649)
- Garrison/HQ: Trechtymirów (Trakhtemyriv), Kiev Voivodeship
- Engagements: Livonian War, Moldavian Magnate Wars, Polish–Ottoman War, Polish–Muscovite War

Commanders
- Notable commanders: Petro Konashevych-Sahaidachny, Mykhailo Doroshenko, others

Registered Cossacks (Note: Ukrainian: Реєстрові козаки, romanized: Rejestrovi kozaky; Polish: Kozacy rejestrowi) comprised special Cossack units of the Polish–Lithuanian Commonwealth army in the 16th and 17th centuries.

Registered Cossacks became a military formation of the Commonwealth army beginning in 1572 soon after the Union of Lublin (1569), when most of the territory of modern Ukraine passed to the Crown of Poland. Registered Cossack formations were based on the Zaporozhian Cossacks who already lived on the lower reaches of the Dnieper River amidst the Pontic steppes as well as on self-defense formations within settlements in the region of modern Central and Southern Ukraine.

Since the beginning of the Khmelnytsky Uprising of 1648, the majority of Registered Cossacks joined the rebels, contributing to early Polish defeats. The term "Registered Cossacks" largely went out of use after the 1660s, being replaced by the term Town Cossacks (Ukrainian: Городові козаки, romanized: Horodovi kozaky) in the Cossack Hetmanate.

== History ==
=== Origins ===
In 1524, King Sigismund I commissioned Semen Połozowicz and Krzysztof Kmitycz to organize permanent Cossack units to defend the lower Dnieper; however, the plan was not implemented due to a lack of funds. The starosta of Cherkasy, Ostap Dashkevych, revived the idea at the 1533 Polish Sejm in Piotrków Trybunalski. Dashkevych tried to show that in order to protect the borders beyond the Dnieper River it would be necessary to maintain an army of 2,000 soldiers and several hundred cavalrymen. He pointed out the importance of establishing forts on the river's islands to keep Tatar raids in check. Although the plans to establish permanent Cossack units were not realized at that time, Polish and Lithuanian border starosts frequently made use of Cossack troops in fights against the Tatars, both for defensive purposes and in retaliatory raids.

In 1568 Sigismund II Augustus sent a proposition to the Zaporizhian Cossacks to join his royal service in exchange of payment. In 1570 Great Crown Hetman Jerzy Jazłowiecki formed first 300-men Cossack unit, under the command of Jan Badowski, which was although disbanded after their death in 1575.

=== Batory reforms ===
Elected King of Poland in 1575, the Prince of Transylvania, Stephen Báthory, undertook a comprehensive effort to bring order to the Ukrainian borderlands, where the Cossack element had grown into a significant force and was launching independent raids against the Ottoman Empire and its vassals, Moldavia and the Crimean Khanate.

In the course of negotiations with Cossack representatives, he established a permanent 500-man Cossack unit, whose members were registered and received regular pay. The king granted them a banner, a seal, and a mace, and designated the town of Trakhtemyriv as their official residence. Prince Michał Wiśniowiecki was appointed as the supreme commander of the host, with Jan Oryszowski as its military leader and Jancza Beger as the scribe. In return, the Cossacks were forbidden from conducting independent raids.

The unit took part in the war against Muscovy. Later registers recorded varying numbers of Cossacks officially enlisted—up to 600 in 1583 and 1,000 in 1590. Although payments were often irregular, the very existence of the register, along with royal edicts confirming their autonomy from local administration, fostered among the Cossacks a sense of estate-based distinctiveness. The register also failed to put an end to Cossack raids, in which registered Cossacks often participated.

In 1590 the Sejm issued a new declaration re-creating the Cossack units. A royal edict issued on July 25, 1590, envisaged registering 1,000 Cossacks for policing duty in order to prevent unauthorized raids into neighboring countries. The registered Cossacks were paid from 5 to 12 zlotys each quarter, and the Zaporizhian Sich was selected as their headquarters. As the Polish interests aimed in securing the Swedish crown, however, the Cossack movement was allowed to grow out of control, leading to a series of local rebellions by polkovnyk Krzysztof Kosiński and Severyn Nalyvaiko, with assistance from kosh otaman of the Zaporozhian Cossacks Hryhoriy Loboda.

== Organization ==
Registered Cossacks formed an elite among the Cossacks, serving in the military under officers (starshyna), colonels (polkovnyk) and generals (hetman), under the Grand Crown Hetman (the highest Commonwealth military commander). A substantial minority of Cossacks formed skilled light cavalry units (choragiew), excellent skirmishers trained in mounted archery (and later using firearms), making lightning raids, harassing heavier, slower formations and disengaging. Those units were often used as support for heavy elite Commonwealth cavalry, the husaria, and were much cheaper to form than a hussar unit. The main Cossack units were the infantry, known for their tabor formation.

Registered Cossacks had many privileges, including personal freedom, exemption from many taxes and duties, and the right to receive wages, although the Commonwealth military's fiscal problems, led to delayed payments, often via items like clothing or weapons instead of coin.

Many Cossacks were skilled warriors and their major income source came from raids on the southern neighbors of the Commonwealth: the (Ottoman Empire and its vassals). However, only a small number were actually 'registered Cossacks'; the exact number was from few hundred to few thousand and varied over time, usually increasing during wartime. This led to many social and political tensions, especially as szlachta (Polish and Ukrainian gentry) continually attempted to force the Cossacks into submission as peasants, while the Cossacks demanded significant expansions of the Cossack register. Furthermore, the Cossack-szlachta conflict was aggravated as Cossacks often supported Commonwealth monarchs like Wladyslaw IV Waza who were at odds with Polish szlachta who wished to further limit the monarch's powers. The tensions between the Cossacks and szlachta grew from the late 16th century and resulted in several uprisings with the registered Cossacks often forced to choose sides between supporting their own people or the szlachta-backed Commonwealth forces. Eventually the king's refusal to expand the registry led to the Khmelnytsky uprising of 1648.

=== Register ===
Registered Cossacks regiments in 1649
#	Headquarters	Number of Registered Cossacks
1	Bila Tserkva	2990
2	Bratslav	2662
3	Cherkasy	2990
4	Chernihiv	998
5	Chyhyryn	3220
6	Kalnyk	2050
7	Kaniv	3167
8	Kyiv	2002
9	Korsun	3470
10	Kropyvna	1993
11	Myrhorod	3009
12	Nizhyn	991
13	Pereyaslav	2986
14	Poltava	2970
15	Pryluky	1996
16	Uman	2977

- 2 June 1572: 300 Registered Cossacks.
- 1578: 600 Registered Cossacks.
- 25 June 1590: 1,000 Registered Cossacks.
- 1618: 10,000 Registered Cossacks.
- October 1619, Rostavytsia Treaty: 3,000 Registered Cossacks.
- 1620: 20,000 Registered Cossacks.
- 5 November 1625, Treaty of Kurukove: 6,000 Registered Cossacks. (Note: The Registered Cossacks also gained the right elect their own hetman, subject to approval by the king.)
- Early 1630, Chorny–Kysil decree: 300 Zaporizhian Cossacks removed from the Register.
- 8 June 1630, Treaty of Pereiaslav (1630): 8,000 Registered Cossacks.
- 1638, Ordinance of the Zaporizhian Host: First 6,000, then 5,000 Registered Cossacks. (Note: The Registered Cossacks also lost the right elect their own hetman (replaced by a government commissioner subordinated to the Grand Crown Hetman), and to have their own court system; all Cossacks excluded from the Register were enserfed.)
- August 1649, Treaty of Zboriv: 40,000 Registered Cossacks.
- 28 September 1651, Treaty of Bila Tserkva: 20,000 Registered Cossacks.
- c. 1652~1653, Khmelnytsky's decree: 50,000 Registered Cossacks.
- 1654, Khmelnytsky's decree: 60,000 Registered Cossacks.

== Hetmanate era ==
=== United Hetmanate (1648–1660) ===
According to the Treaty of Zboriv, signed on 18 August 1649, the number of Registered Cossacks increased up to 40,000.

According to the 1654 Pereyaslav Agreement, Khmelnytsky's Cossacks pledged their loyalty to the Russian Tsar, who guaranteed their protection, the recognition of their starshyna (officer-nobility) and their property and autonomy under his rule, supposedly freeing the Cossacks from the Polish sphere of influence. However, the Tsar reneged on his word 2.5 years later by signing the Truce of Vilna with Poland, abandoning the Cossacks who were still under Polish attacks at the time.

=== Right-Bank Hetmanate (1660–1699) ===
Individual Cossacks continued to settle in regions of Right-bank Ukraine, which remained part of the Commonwealth under the Treaty of Andrusovo (1667). As a result, Registered Cossacks remained an official unit of the Polish–Lithuanian army until the liquidation of Cossacks as a separate class in the Commonwealth with the Treaty of Karlowitz in 1699.

=== Left-Bank Hetmanate (Town Cossacks, 1660–1765) ===
Under the rule of Left-Bank hetmans between the mid-17th and late 18th centuries, Registered Cossacks became part of the class of "Town Cossacks". They were the largest group of "service people" in the Hetmanate and were recruited on a hereditary basis. According to the hetmans' agreements with the tsars, Town Cossacks received the right to inherit property, were freed of taxation and could engage in various activities including trade, crafts, hunting, fishing and sale of alcohol. They were subject to a separate jurisdiction and could only be judged by a Cossack military tribunal headed by the hetman and members of Cossack starshyna.

Most of the Town Cossacks served as cavalry. Their numbers in Left-bank Ukraine rose from 20,000 during the 1660s to 30,000 in 1687 and 55,240 in 1723. During the hetmanship of Ivan Skoropadsky and Danylo Apostol in the 1720s additional duties were introduced for Town Cossacks, including quartering of dragoons, payment of general taxes and participation in public works. According to a 1735 decree by the tsarist government, only Elected Cossacks retained their old rights. During that period numerous Town Cossacks entered into dependence from landowners. After the introduction of serfdom in Left-bank Ukraine in 1783, most of them received equal status with state peasants.

== See also ==
- Elected Cossacks – Ukrainian Cossacks officially recognized under Russian imperial rule.

== Bibliography ==
- Hrushevsky, Mykhailo (2003). Illustrated History of Ukraine. Donetsk: BAO. ISBN 966-548-571-7.
- Wynar, Lubomyr (1993). "Registered Cossacks". Encyclopedia of Ukraine. Vol. 4. Canadian Institute of Ukrainian Studies.
- Yakovenko, Natalia (2011). Historia Ukrainy do 1795 roku [History of Ukraine until 1795] (in Polish). Warsaw.
