= Kaniv Regiment =

- Канівський полк
- Coat of arms of the Kaniv Regiment
- Active: 1625–1678
- Country: Cossack Hetmanate
- Type: Cossack regiment
- Size: 16 sotnias, 3167 Cossacks (1649)
- Garrison/HQ: Kaniv, Right-bank Ukraine
- Engagements: Khmelnytsky Uprising; Battle of Pyliavtsi, Battle of Zboriv (1649); Battle of Berestechko; Battle of Batih; Paliy uprising

Commanders
- Notable commanders: Semen Paliy, Petro Doroshenko

The Kaniv Regiment (Ukrainian: Канівський полк) was a regiment of the Registered Cossacks (1625–1638) and later also an administrative subdivision of the Cossack Hetmanate (1648–1678, 1702–1712). It was centred around the town of Kaniv in central Ukraine, on the banks of the Dnieper river.

== History ==
=== Early history ===
The Kaniv regiment was originally formed in 1625 as a unit of the Registered Cossacks, who were formally registered in the army of the Polish–Lithuanian Commonwealth and received an annual salary from the government. Due to the strategic position of the unit, from which crossings over the Dnieper (at Trakhtemyriv, Rzhyshchiv and Kaniv itself) could be controlled, it grew to become one of the largest Cossack units in employ of the Polish king by the 17th century. In early 1648, following the start of the Khmelnytsky Uprising, the regiment became part of Hetman Bohdan Khmelnytsky's army. It was subsequently reformed into an administrative subdivision, also called a regiment, of the early Cossack Hetmanate on 8 September, 1649 following the Treaty of Zboriv, replacing the earlier starostwos of Pereiaslav, Cherkasy and Kaniv, as well as a part of the Kiev Voivodeship. (Note: Military and civilian divisions were often united in the Zaporozhian Host, so that the commander of a regiment would also rule and govern the civilians around his garrison.)

By the register (or census) of 1649, the regiment as a whole had 3167 Cossacks and 19 sotnias, while Kaniv itself hosted 2263 Cossacks and 10 sotnias, making it the 3rd largest in the Hetmanate, only behind the Korsun Regiment and Chyhyryn Regiment. Between 18 September 1651 and 8 January 1654, the administrative divisions of the regiment were changed, as the Maslivka and Trakhtemyriv sotnias were disbanded and the number of Kaniv sotnias reduced to 5, while two new sotnias were formed at Bubniv and Konochan. By 1654, the regiment thus numbered 3152 Cossacks and 11 sotnias.

During the Khmelnytsky Uprising, the regiment was engaged in some battles against the Polish army, such as at Pyliavtsi, Zboriv, Berestechko and Batih.

=== The Ruin ===
During the Ruin, when skirmishes and conflict between different Cossack factions was common, the regiment often changed hands between different hetmans. In 1667, as part of the Truce of Andrusovo, the regiment became part of the Polish–Lithuanian Commonwealth once more. However, only a year later, in 1668, Petro Doroshenko seized the regiment and incorporated it into the territory of Ottoman Ukraine, in which it would remain part until its functional disbandment in 1676, as only 3 sotnias remained active. Eventually, after the Treaty of Bakhchisarai in 1681, the regiment was completely disbanded, after which its members settled in neighbouring regions, mostly in Left-bank Ukraine.

=== Later revival and end ===
Around the 1680's, the regiment was reformed by Semen Paliy, although it was now based in Bohuslav, and was thus sometimes referred to as the Bohuslav regiment. In 1702, a new regiment now centred around Kaniv was formed and engaged in the Paliy uprising, but it was once again disbanded in 1712, as part of the conditions of the Treaty of the Pruth.

Kaniv Regiment Канівський полк (Ukrainian)
- Regiment of the Cossack Hetmanate
- 1648–1712
- Coat of arms

- The Kaniv Regiment (red) in the Cossack Hetmanate in 1660
- Capital: Kaniv
- History
  - Khmelnytsky Uprising: 1648
  - Treaty of the Pruth: 1712
| Preceded by | Succeeded by |
| Kiev Voivodeship | Kiev Governorate |
- Today part of: Ukraine

== Administrative divisions and commanders ==
Sotnias of the regiment (1649)
| Name | Size (men) | Commander | Garrison |
| Starodub | | Ivan Starodub | |
| Volynets | | Pavlo Volynets | |
| Kulaha | | Yakym Kulaha | |
| Bohdanenko | | Fesko Bohdanenko | |
| Huniak | | Fedir Huniak | |
| Roshchenko | | Petro Roshchenko | |
| Klym | | Klym Malashenko | |
| Yukhymov | | Yukhym Roshchenko | |
| Andrii | | Andrii | |
| Mezhyrich | 147 | Suprun Mykhailovych | Mezhyrich, Cherkasy Oblast |
| Trakhtemyriv | 167 | Tsepkovskyi | Trakhtemyriv |
| Rzhyshchiv | 222 | Chuhui | Rzhyshchiv |
| Staiky | 170 | Taras Sheremet | Staiky, Kyiv Oblast |
| Mykhailiv | 98 | Danylo Yukhymovych | Mykhailivka, Cherkasy Oblast |
| Maslivka | 100 | Semen Yevlashenko | Maslivka, Kyiv Oblast |
| Kaniv | | Ivan Holota | Kaniv |

According to the Zboriv register of 1649, the regimental scribe (Ukrainian: Писар) was Herasym Savych, while the Yesaul was Bohdan Shabelnychenko.

== Bibliography ==
- Заруба, Віктор (2007). Адміністративно-територіальний устрій та адміністрація Війська Запорозького у 1648-1782 рр [Administrative-territorial divisions and governance of the Zaporozhian Host, 1648-1782] (in Ukrainian). ISBN 978-966-383-095-7.
