= Administrative divisions of Ukraine =

The administrative divisions of Ukraine (Ukrainian: Адміністративний устрій України, romanized: Administratyvnyi ustrii Ukrainy [ɐd⁽ʲ⁾min⁽ʲ⁾istrɐˈtɪu̯nɪj ˈust⁽ʲ⁾r⁽ʲ⁾ij ʊkrɐˈjinɪ]) are under the jurisdiction of the Ukrainian Constitution. Ukraine is a unitary state with three levels of administrative divisions: 27 regions (24 oblasts, two cities with special status and one autonomous republic), 136 raions (districts) and 1469 hromadas.

The administrative reform of July 2020 merged most of the 490 legacy raions and 118 pre-2020 cities of regional significance into 136 reorganized raions, or districts of Ukraine. The next level below raions are hromadas.

Following the annexations of Crimea and southeastern Ukraine by the Russian Federation, Autonomous Republic of Crimea and Sevastopol as well as portions of Donetsk, Kherson, Luhansk and Zaporizhzhia oblasts came under the de facto administration of the Russian Federation. Internationally, most states have not recognized the Russian claims.

== Overview ==
According to Article 133 of the Constitution of Ukraine as amended, the system of administrative and territorial organization of Ukraine consists of the Autonomous Republic of Crimea, oblasts (provinces), raions (districts), populated places (cities, rural settlements, villages), urban districts, and hromadas (municipalities).

In the administrative reform of 2020, all populated places in the country (except for two cities with special status, Kyiv and Sevastopol) were resubordinated to raions. The 136 newly-created raions included 10 in the Autonomous Republic of Crimea and Sevastopol; since September 2023, the Crimean raions are functional.

Administrative divisions of Ukraine
Level of subdivision	Territory	Total
First	autonomous republic	1
First	cities with special status	2
First	oblasts (provinces)	24
Second	raions (districts)	136
Third	hromadas (municipalities)	1469

== First level ==
There are three types of first-level administrative divisions: 24 oblasts (regions), 1 autonomous republic and 2 cities with special status.

Colour	Description
24 oblasts	An oblast (sometimes translated as region or province) is the main type of first-level administrative division of the country. Ukraine is a unitary state, thus the oblasts do not have much legal scope of competence other than that which is established in the Ukrainian Constitution and by law. Articles 140–146 of Chapter XI of the constitution deal directly with local authorities and their competency.
1 autonomous republic	The administrative status of the Autonomous Republic of Crimea is recognized in the Ukrainian Constitution in Chapter X: Autonomous Republic of Crimea and is governed in accordance with laws passed by Ukraine's parliament. In 2014, the autonomous republic was illegally annexed by Russia as the Republic of Crimea.
2 cities with special status	There are two cities with special status: Kyiv and Sevastopol (occupied since 2014). Their administrative status is recognized in the Ukrainian Constitution in Chapter IX: Territorial Structure of Ukraine. Unlike the oblasts and the autonomous republic, the cities with special status only have urban districts and are not subdivided into hromadas.

=== List ===
Flag	Coat of arms	No.	Name	Area (km^{2})	Population (2021 estimate)	Population density (people/km^{2}, 2021)	Capital	Governors	No. of raions	No. of hromadas	Location
		1	Autonomous; Republic of Crimea	26,081	1,967,259	75.43	Simferopol	Olha Kuryshko	10	—	
		2	Vinnytsia Oblast	26,513	1,529,123	57.67	Vinnytsia	Nataliya Zabolotna	6	63	
		3	Volyn Oblast	20,144	1,027,397	51.00	Lutsk	Roman Romanyuk	4	54	
		4	Dnipropetrovsk Oblast	31,974	3,142,035	98.27	Dnipro	Vladyslav Haivanenko	7	86	
		5	Donetsk Oblast	26,517	4,100,280	154.63	Donetsk (de-jure); Kramatorsk (de-facto)	Vadym Filashkin	8	66	
		6	Zhytomyr Oblast	29,832	1,195,495	40.07	Zhytomyr	Vitaliy Bunechko	4	65	
		7	Zakarpattia Oblast	12,777	1,250,129	97.84	Uzhhorod	Myroslav Biletskyi	6	64	
		8	Zaporizhzhia Oblast	27,180	1,666,515	61.31	Zaporizhzhia	Ivan Fedorov	5	67	
		9	Ivano-Frankivsk Oblast	13,928	1,361,109	97.72	Ivano-Frankivsk	Svitlana Onyshchuk	6	62	
		10	Kyiv Oblast	28,131	1,788,530	63.58	Kyiv	Mykola Kalashnyk	7	69	
		11	Kirovohrad Oblast	24,588	920,128	37.42	Kropyvnytskyi	Andriy Raykovych	4	49	
		12	Luhansk Oblast	26,684	2,121,322	79.50	Luhansk (de-jure); Sievierodonetsk (de-facto, 2014–2022)	Oleksii Kharchenko	8	37	
		13	Lviv Oblast	21,833	2,497,750	114.40	Lviv	Maksym Kozytskyi	7	73	
		14	Mykolaiv Oblast	24,598	1,108,394	45.06	Mykolaiv	Vitalii Kim	4	52	
		15	Odesa Oblast	33,310	2,368,107	71.09	Odesa	Oleh Kiper	7	91	
		16	Poltava Oblast	28,748	1,371,529	47.71	Poltava	Vitaliy Dyakivnych	4	60	
		17	Rivne Oblast	20,047	1,148,456	57.29	Rivne	Oleksandr Koval	4	64	
		18	Sumy Oblast	23,834	1,053,452	44.20	Sumy	Oleh Hryhorov	5	51	
		19	Ternopil Oblast	13,823	1,030,562	74.55	Ternopil	Taras Pastukh	3	55	
		20	Kharkiv Oblast	31,415	2,633,834	83.84	Kharkiv	Oleh Syniehubov	7	56	
		21	Kherson Oblast	28,461	1,016,707	35.72	Kherson	Oleksandr Prokudin	5	49	
		22	Khmelnytskyi Oblast	20,645	1,243,787	60.25	Khmelnytskyi	Serhii Tiurin	3	60	
		23	Cherkasy Oblast	20,900	1,178,266	56.38	Cherkasy	Ihor Taburets	4	66	
		24	Chernivtsi Oblast	8,097	896,566	110.73	Chernivtsi	Ruslan Osypenko	3	52	
		25	Chernihiv Oblast	31,865	976,701	30.65	Chernihiv	Vyacheslav Chaus	5	57	
		26	Kyiv	839	2,962,180	3530.61	Kyiv	Vitali Klitschko	10	—	
		27	Sevastopol	864	385,870	446.61	Sevastopol	—	4	—	

=== Autonomous republic ===
The Autonomous Republic of Crimea (Ukrainian: Автономна Республіка Крим) geographically encompasses the major portion of the Crimean peninsula in southern Ukraine. Its capital is Simferopol. The Autonomous Republic of Crimea is the only region within Ukraine that has its own constitution.

On 16 March 2014, after the occupation of Crimea by the Russian military, a referendum on joining the Russian Federation was held. A majority of votes supported the measure. On 21 March 2014, the Russian Duma voted to annex Crimea as a subject into the Russian Federation. The Ukrainian government does not recognize the referendum or annexation of Crimea as legitimate. On 27 March, the UN General Assembly passed Resolution 68/262 by 100 to 11 votes, recognizing the referendum as invalid and denying any legal change in the status of Crimea and Sevastopol.

=== Oblasts ===
An oblast (Ukrainian: область; pl. області) is on the first level of the administrative division of Ukraine.

Most oblasts are named after their administrative center. Volyn and Zakarpattia oblasts, whose respective capitals are Lutsk and Uzhhorod, are named after the historic regions Volhynia and Transcarpathia.

=== Cities with special status ===
Two cities have special status (Ukrainian: міста зі спеціальним статусом): Kyiv and Sevastopol. Their special status puts them on the same administrative level as the oblasts, and thus under the direct supervision of the state via their respective local state administrations, which constitute the executive bodies of the cities. Following the annexation of Crimea by the Russian Federation, Sevastopol is controlled by Russia and is incorporated as a federal subject of Russia.

== Second level ==
=== Raions ===
Raions (Ukrainian: район; pl. райони) are smaller territorial units of subdivision in Ukraine. There are 136 raions. Following the December 2019 draft constitutional changes submitted to the Verkhovna Rada by President Volodymyr Zelenskyy, 136 new raions have replaced the former 490 raions of Ukraine.

=== Urban districts ===
An urban district is subordinate to the city administration.

== Third level ==
=== Hromadas ===
The territorial hromadas (Ukrainian: територіальна громада; lit. 'territorial community'; pl. територіальні громади), or simply hromadas (Ukrainian: громада; pl. громади) were established by the Government of Ukraine on 12 June 2020 as a part of administrative reform that started in 2015.

There are three types of hromadas: rural (Ukrainian: сільська громада), settlement (Ukrainian: селищна громада) and urban (Ukrainian: міська громада). There are 1469 hromadas in total (as of November 1, 2023).

== History ==
The Cossack Hetmanate was divided into military-administrative districts known as regimental districts (polks) whose number fluctuated with the size of the Hetmanate's territory. In 1649, when the Hetmanate controlled both the right and left banks, it included 16 such districts. After the loss of Right-bank Ukraine, this number was reduced to ten. The regimental districts were further divided into companies (sotnias), which were administered by captains (sotnyk). The lowest division was the kurin.

Kropyvna Regiment

Lubny Regiment

Chyhyryn Regiment

Chernihiv Regiment

Nizhyn Regiment

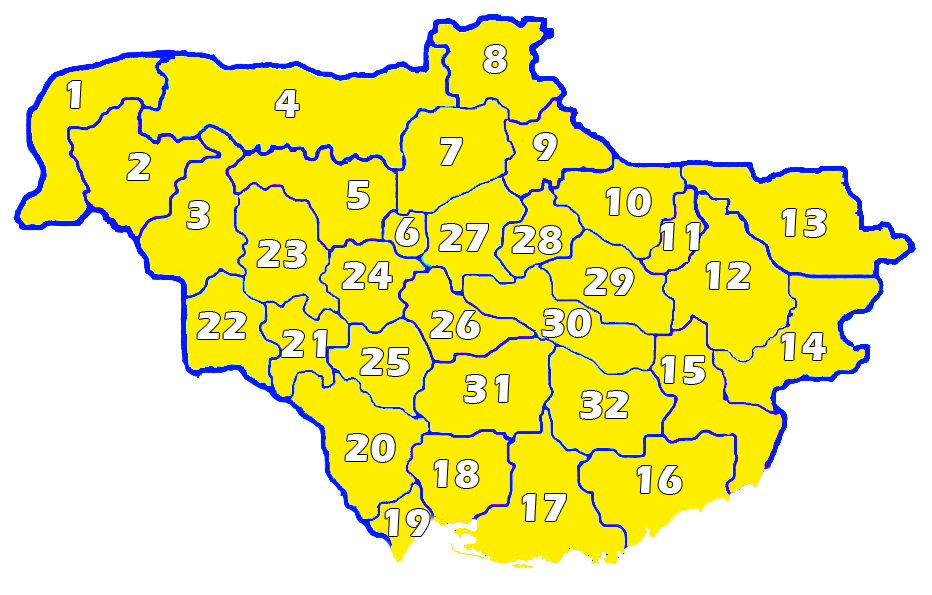
Zemlias of Ukraine in 1918

According to the Constitution of the Ukrainian People's Republic, the country was divided into zemlias (lands), volosts and hromadas (communities). This law was not fully implemented as on 29 April 1918 there was the anti-socialist coup in Kyiv, after which Pavlo Skoropadskyi reverted the reform back to the governorate-type administration.

Before the introduction of oblasts in 1932, Soviet Ukraine comprised 40 okruhas, which had replaced the former Russian Imperial governorate subdivisions.

In 1932 the territory of the Soviet Ukraine was re-established based on oblasts. At the same time, most of the Western Ukraine at the time formed part of the Second Polish Republic and shared in the Polish form of administrative division based on voivodeships.
