= Bila Tserkva Regiment =

Bila Tserkva Regiment Білоцерківський полк
- Active: 1625-1674, 1702-1712
- Country: Cossack Hetmanate
- Type: Cossack Regiment
- Size: 2990 Cossacks (1649); 18 sotnias (1651)
- Garrison/HQ: Bila Tserkva, Right-bank Ukraine
- Engagements: Khmelnytsky Uprising; Battle of Batoh

Commanders
- Notable commanders: Semen Paliy

Bila Tserkva Regiment Білоцерківський полк (Ukrainian)
- Regiment of Cossack Hetmanate
- 1648–1712
- Coat of arms

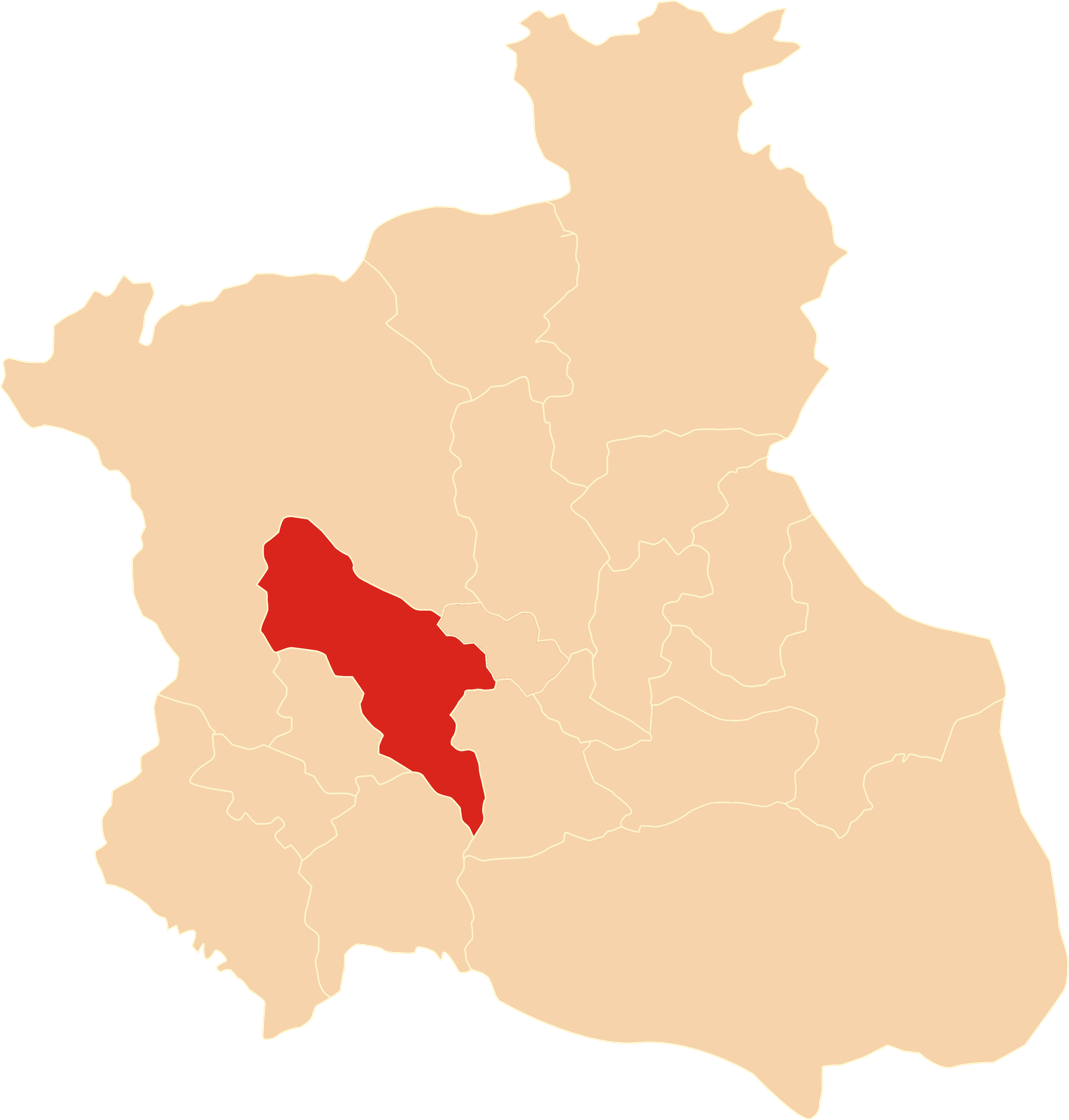
- Geographic scope of the regiment in 1660 (in red) in comparison to the rest of Cossack Hetmanate
- Capital: Bila Tserkva
- History
  - Khmelnytsky Uprising: 1648
  - Treaty of the Pruth: 1712
Preceded by	Succeeded by
Kiev Voivodeship	Kiev Voivodeship
- Today part of: Ukraine

The Bila Tserkva Regiment (Ukrainian: Білоцерківський полк) was one of the seventeen territorial-administrative subdivisions of the Hetman State. The regiment's capital was the city of Bila Tserkva, now in the Kyiv Oblast of central Ukraine. Other major cities of the regiment were Hermanivka, Fastiv, Bohuslav, and Skvyra.

The regiment was created as a result of the Treaty of Kurukove, between the Zaporozhian Cossacks and the Polish–Lithuanian Commonwealth which led the establishment of six regiments of registered cossacks that existed before the Khmelnytsky Uprising. The regiment occupied a large amount area on the Right-bank Ukraine, and bordered by the Kyiv Regiment to the east, Korsun Regiment by the south, and the Uman Regiment to the west. In 1648 the regiment was incorporated into the Cossack Hetmanate when the Khmelnytsky uprising occurred. Following the signing of the treaty of Zboriv in 1649 it consisted of a total of 23 sotnias, and had 2,990 registered Cossacks. During the uprising the regiment took part in battles in batih, and Starokostiantyniv.

In 1651 the eastern part of the regiment which consisted of the Pavoloch, and Skvyra sotnias were incorporated into the Pavoloch Regiment. According to the 1654 census the Bila Tserkva regiment had 18 companies which consisted of 19 cities and towns (among were Fastiv, Volodarka, Boyarka, and Bohuslav) with the population having 6,668 cossacks and townspeople.

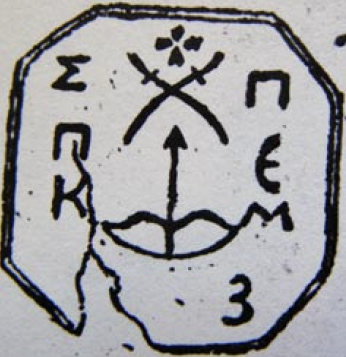
Seal of Semen Paliy, one of the regiment's commanders

When a civil war emerged among the cossacks the Hetmanate was split along the Dnieper River into Left-Bank Ukraine and Right-Bank Ukraine, which placed the regiment under the control of Right-bank Ukraine hetmans. After the Treaty of Andrusovo in 1667, the Right-bank Ukraine and its regiments came under the administration of Poland and in 1674 the regiment was abolished by the Polish government.

During the Semen Paliy insurrection of 1702, Bila Tserkva was captured by Paliy's rebels and the territory was placed under the Fastiv regiment, but was later restored back into the Bila Tserkva regiment and made the headquarters for Paliy. Once the rebellion was repressed and with Polish authority being reinstated the Right-bank cossack administration was abolished in 1712 by the Treaty of Prut. The regiment was disbanded and all of its territories were annexed into the Kyiv Voivodeship, while the remaining cossacks moved to the left-bank Ukraine.

== Administrative subdivisions ==
According to the 1649 Registry of the Zaporozhian Host, the regiment had following subdivisions:

- Chornyi Kamin
- Hermanivka
- Kamianyi Brid
- Fastiv
- Vilkhovets
- Boyarka
- Antoniv
- Torchytsia
- Piatyhirya
- Skvyra
- Didivshchyna
- Karapyshi
- Pavoloch
- Khodorkiv
- Ivnytsia
- Byshiv
- Vodotyi
- Villia
- Brusyliv
- Rozhiv
- Viytashivka
- Korostyshiv
