= Trakhtemyriv Monastery =

Historic cossack monastery in Cherkasy Oblast

- Трахтемирівський монастир
- Location within Ukraine
- Trakhtemyriv Monastery
- 49°59′25″N 31°23′05″E
- Location: Cherkasy Raion, Cherkasy Oblast
- Country: Ukraine
- Denomination: Eastern Orthodox

Architecture
- Years built: unknown

The Trakhtemyriv Monastery (Ukrainian: Трахтемирівський монастир, romanized: Trakhtemyrivskyi monastyr) was an Orthodox monastery near the town of Trakhtemyriv in the 16th–18th century.

The precise location of the monastery remains uncertain. It is generally associated with the former village of Monastyrok, near Trakhtemyriv and Zarubyntsi, on the right bank of the Dnieper. The area was substantially altered by the construction of the Kaniv Reservoir in the 1970s. Archaeological investigations have not identified the monastery's remains.

== Origins ==
The monastery was first mentioned in historical sources in 1552, when it was part of the nearby Zarubskyj Monastery or Zarubnytsi Monastery, and was named "Prechystenskyj Monastery" (referring to the Assumption of the Virgin Mary)." According to a later legend, the monastery was granted to the Cossacks by King Stephen Báthory in 1578, to be used as a hospital for wounded and ill Cossacks. According to the same legend, this was associated with the king's establishment of a 6,000-strong Cossack army, complete with a hetman, insignia, a seal, and a capital at Chyhyryn. According to Tatiana Tairova-Yakovleva (2020), it was "the place where in the sixteenth century the Registered Cossacks began and where the first official residence of the hetman was located."

In fact, it was not until 1590 that a resolution of the Sejm granted the registered Cossacks the right to use the monastery.

== Status as a hospital ==
The first recorded mention of the intention to establish a hospital for wounded and ill Cossacks dates back to 1601. It was not until a resolution of the Zhytomyr Commission of 1614 that it was determined that the Trakhtemyriv Monastery was to become a hospital. This resolution was put into effect at the end of 1615 or beginning of 1616. Otherwise, the functioning of the hospital at the monastery is practically not covered in the sources.

== 17th century ==
The monastery presumably ceased to exist between 1678 and 1686. The Polish–Russian Perpetual Peace Treaty of 1686 mentioned Trakhtemyriv amongst the ruined and small towns on the Right Bank, depopulated since the Great Expulsion of the 1670s, that were to remain empty:

"Concerning those ruined towns and small towns along the river Tiasmyn from the little town of Staek below the Dnipro river, namely Rzhyshchiv, Trakhtemyriv, Kaniv, Moshny, Sokolnia, Cherkasy, Borovytsia, Buzhyn, Voron'kiv, Kryliv, and Chyhyryn (all the old Cossack towns) ... they reached an agreement and decided that those places should remain empty, as they are now."

== 18th century ==
By a decree dated 1 December 1701, Hetman Ivan Mazepa transferred the monasteries in Trakhtemyriv and Kaniv to Zakhariy Kornylovych, Bishop of Pereiaslav and Boryspil; the Trakhtemyriv Monastery was deserted at the time. In 1714, the bishop was referred to as the "Hegumen of Trakhtemyriv"; Mykola Zharkykh (2013) commented that the combination of Kornylovych's position as bishop and hegumen "casts doubt on the real functioning of the monastery at that time". The monastery was dedicated to the Exaltation of the Holy Cross. From 1718 to 1768, it belonged to the Uniate Church, after which it was taken over by the Orthodox Church. However, the monastery ceased to function again shortly thereafter, when the building became a Polish border customs house in 1775.

== Bibliography ==
- Tairova-Yakovleva, Tatiana (2020). Ivan Mazepa and the Russian Empire (PDF). Montreal Kingston London Chicago: McGill-Queen's Press. p. 425. ISBN 978-0-2280-0309-0.
- Yakovenko, Natalia (2011). Historia Ukrainy do 1795 roku [History of Ukraine until 1795] (in Polish). Warsaw: Wydawnictwo Naukowe PWN.
- Zharkykh, Mykola Ivanovych (2013). "Трахтемирівський монастир" [Trakhtemyrivskyj Monastyr]. Encyclopedia of History of Ukraine (in Ukrainian). Vol. 10. Kyiv: Institute of History of Ukraine. p. 140. Archived from the original on 2019-07-05.
