= Regiment (administrative unit) =

Administrative territorial entity

A regiment (Ukrainian: полк, romanized: polk) is a historical administrative, territorial, military and judicial unit of subdivision in the Cossack Hetmanate and Sloboda Ukraine (Slobidska Ukraine) in the 17th–18th centuries.

Regiments were headed by a colonel (Ukrainian: полковник, romanized: polkovnyk), who was a member of the Council of Officers (Ukrainian: рада старшин, romanized: rada starshyn). The regimental system evolved out of the existing system of Registered Cossacks (later Town Cossacks) in the Kyiv, Bratslav and Chernihiv Voivodeships in the Polish–Lithuanian Commonwealth, whose government appointed the colonels until 1648.

== Overview ==
The regiment was the first level of the administrative and military division of the Cossack Hetmanate. The second level was the sotnia (company), the third level was the kurin.

Subdivisions of the Cossack Hetmanate
| First | Regiment | Ukrainian: полк, romanized: polk, pl. Ukrainian: полки, romanized: polky |
| Second | Sotnia | Ukrainian: сотня, romanized: sotnia, pl. Ukrainian: сотні, romanized: sotni |
| Third | Kurin | Ukrainian: курінь, romanized: kurin, pl. Ukrainian: курені, romanized: kureni |

== Regiments ==
=== Evolution ===
Example: Registered Cossacks regiments in 1649
| # | Headquarters | Number of Registered Cossacks |
|---|---|---|
| 1 | Bila Tserkva | 2990 |
| 2 | Bratslav | 2662 |
| 3 | Cherkasy | 2990 |
| 4 | Chernihiv | 998 |
| 5 | Chyhyryn | 3220 |
| 6 | Kalnyk | 2050 |
| 7 | Kaniv | 3167 |
| 8 | Kyiv | 2002 |
| 9 | Korsun | 3470 |
| 10 | Kropyvna | 1993 |
| 11 | Myrhorod | 3009 |
| 12 | Nizhyn | 991 |
| 13 | Pereyaslav | 2986 |
| 14 | Poltava | 2970 |
| 15 | Pryluky | 1996 |
| 16 | Uman | 2977 |

Historically, there have been 51 Cossack regiments in Ukraine in the 17th and 18th century in total. The number of active regiments varied over time. For example, when the Cossack Hetmanate was recognised by the Treaty of Zboriv in 1647, and controlled both Right-bank Ukraine and Left-bank Ukraine, there were 16 regiments. The treaty stipulated a maximum of 40,000 Registered Cossacks. Gędek (2009) calculated that the 16 regiments in the year 1649 had slightly more than that: 40,471.

From 1650 to 1653, it included 17 regiments: 10 in Right-bank Ukraine, and 7 in Left-bank Ukraine. As the Hetmanate was splitting the 1660s, Left-bank Ukraine increased its 7 regiments to 10 in the late 1650s and early 1660s. In Right-bank Ukraine, the regiments gradually disappeared in the 1670s and 1680s due to military reforms in the Commonwealth, although during the Paliy uprising (1702–1704), Semen Paliy restored four old Right-bank regiments in 1702, and created three new regiments in 1704. Once the Commonwealth restored control over the Right Bank, the seven Right-bank regiments were abolished in 1712, with many of them transferring to the Left Bank by a Russo-Polish treaty. Tsarist Russia abolished the remnants of the regimental system in the 1780s. Sloboda Ukraine had five autonomous Cossack regiments from the 1650s to 1765.

=== List of regiments ===
| Regiment | Ukrainian | Coat of arms | Period |
|---|---|---|---|
| Chyhyryn Regiment | Чигиринський | | 1625–1678 |
| Cherkasy Regiment | Черкаський | | 1625–1686 |
| Korsun Regiment | Корсунський | | 1625–1712 |
| Bila Tserkva Regiment | Білоцерківський | | 1625–1712 |
| Kaniv Regiment | Канівський | | 1625–1712 |
| Pereiaslav Regiment | Переяславський | | 1625–1782 |
| Kyiv Regiment | Київський | | 1625–1782 |
| Myrhorod Regiment | Миргородський | | 1625–1782 |
| Ovruch Regiment | Овруцький | | 1648–1660s |
| Irkliiv Regiment | Іркліївський | | 1648–1648 |
| Sosnytsia Regiment | Сосницький | | 1648–1648 |
| Chornobyl Regiment | Чорнобильський | | 1648–1649 |
| Borzna Regiment | Борзнянський | | 1648–1649 |
| Zhyvotiv Regiment | Животівський | | 1648–1649 |
| Ichnia Regiment | Ічнянський | | 1648–1649 |
| Hadiach Regiment | Гадяцький | | 1648–1649; 1671-1782 |
| Zviahel Regiment | Звягельський | | 1648–1649 |
| Ostropil Regiment | Остропільський | | 1648–1649 |
| Podillia Regiment | Подільський | | 1648–1649 |
| Liubartiv Regiment | Любартівський | | 1648–1649 |
| Lysianka Regiment | Лисянський | | 1648–1657 |
| Bratslav Regiment | Брацлавський | | 1648–1667 |
| Vinnytsia Regiment | Вінницький | | 1648–1667 |
| Uman Regiment | Уманський | | 1648–1675 |
| Pavoloch Regiment | Паволоцький | | 1648–1675 |
| Poltava Regiment | Полтавський | | 1648–1675 |
| Lubny Regiment | Лубенський | | 1648–1781 |
| Nizhyn Regiment | Ніжинський | | 1648–1782 |
| Pryluky Regiment | Прилуцький | | 1648–1782 |
| Chernihiv Regiment | Чернігівський | | 1648–1782 |
| Kropyvna Regiment | Кропивнянський | | 1649–1658 |
| Chechelnyk Regiment | Чечельницький | | 1650–1673 |
| Novhorod Regiment | Новгород-Сіверський | | 1653–1654, 1669 |
| Pinsk–Turiv Regiment | Пінсько-Турівський | | 1654–1659 |
| Belarus Regiment | Білоруський | | 1655–1659 |
| Kremenchuk Regiment | Кременчуцький | | 1661–1666 |
| Zinkiv Regiment | Зіньківський | | 1661–1671 |
| Hlukhiv Regiment | Глухівський | | 1663–1665 |
| Starodub Regiment | Стародубський | | 1663–1782 |
| Fastiv Regiment | Фастівський | | 1684–1712 |
| Bohuslav Regiment | Богуславський | | 1685–1712 |

== Maps of regiments ==
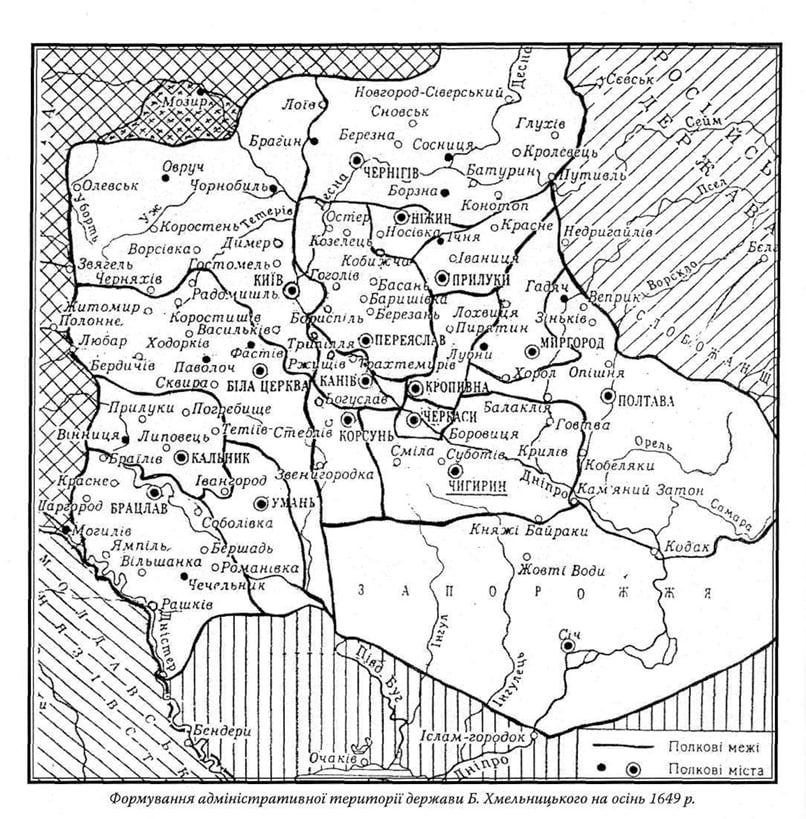
Hetmanate in 1649

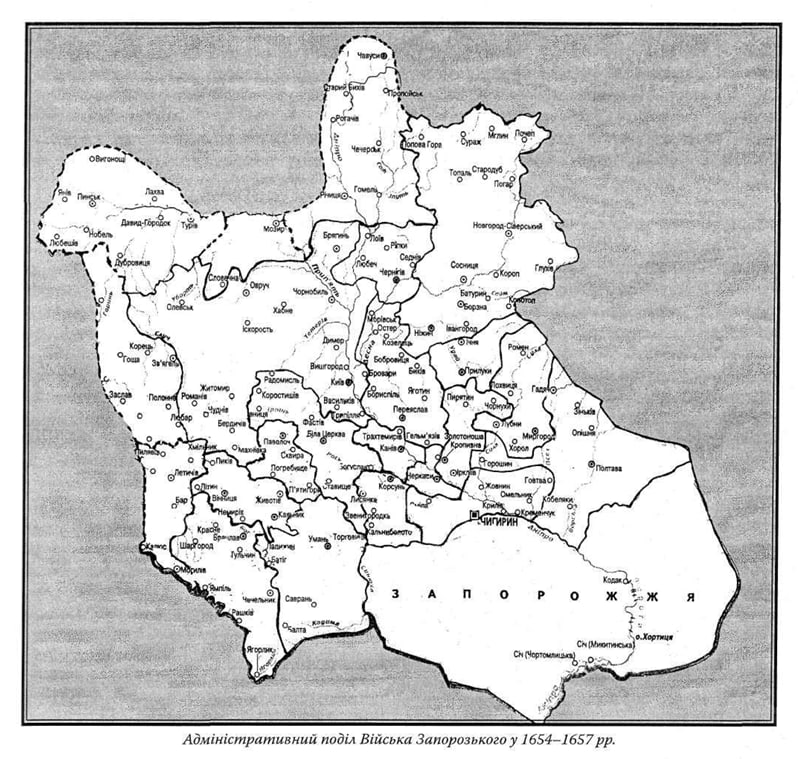
Hetmanate in 1654–1657

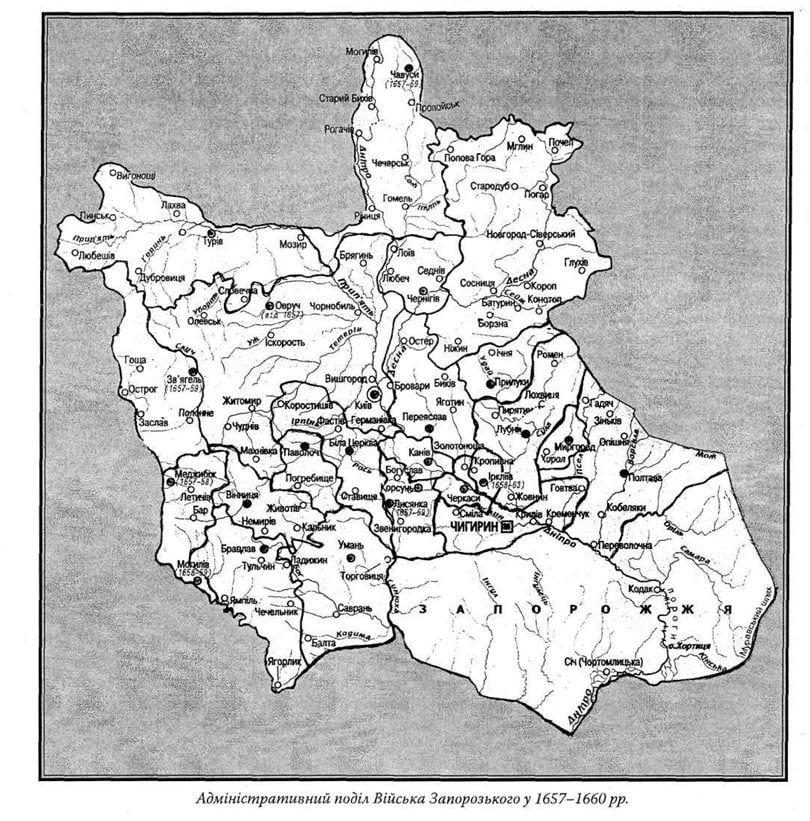
Hetmanate in 1657–1660

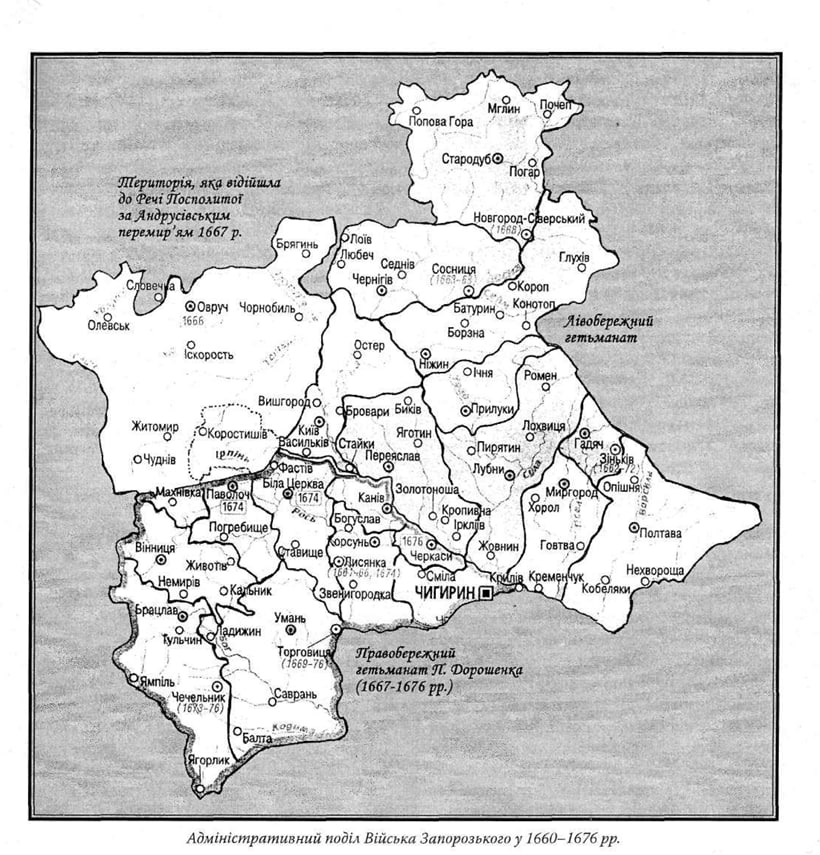
Hetmanate in 1660–1676

Left–Bank Hetmanate in 1781

== See also ==
- Cossack Hetmanate
- Sotnia
- Kurin
- Palanka (administrative unit), a similar division in the Zaporozhian Sich

== Literature ==
- Zhukovsky, Arkadii (1993). "Regimental system". Encyclopedia of Ukraine. Vol. 4. Canadian Institute of Ukrainian Studies.
- Panashenko, V. Regimental system. Encyclopedia of History of Ukraine.
- Magocsi, Paul Robert (1996). A History of Ukraine. Toronto: University of Toronto Press. p. 784. ISBN 0-8020-0830-5.
