= Great Expulsion (Ukraine) =

The Great Expulsion or Great Eviction (Note: 'The Chyhyryn campaigns began (...). In the spring of 1679, the forces of the Left Bank regiments, led by Ivan Samoilovych, carried out the resettlement of the inhabitants of the towns along the Dnipro (Kaniv, Korsun, and others). This is known in history as "the great eviction." Twenty thousand families were forcibly moved to the Left Bank, to Sloboda Ukraine.') (Ukrainian: Великий згін) was a campaign of mass forced resettlement organized by Left-bank hetman Ivan Samoylovych with the support of Muscovite voivodes in Right-bank Ukraine. Initiated in order to weaken the support base of Samoylovych's rival, Right-bank hetman Petro Doroshenko, the campaign started in 1674 and reached its peak in 1678–1679, resulting in the devastation of the territories of the Cherkasy, Kaniv and Korsun regiments, and the forcible transfer of their populations to Left-bank Ukraine. According to contemporary documents, over 20,000 people moved from the Right Bank to the Left Bank during that time. The 1681 Treaty of Bakhchisaray stipulated that the areas of Right-bank Ukraine between the Boh and Dnieper rivers were to remain uninhabited.

== Background ==
Following the 1667 Treaty of Andrusovo, the lands of the Cossack Hetmanate in Ukraine were divided between Poland and the Tsardom of Muscovy, with the Right (Western) bank of the Dnieper coming under the Polish rule and the Left (Eastern) being controlled by Moscow. As a result, rival hetmanates emerged on each bank under protectorate of the respective powers controlling their regions.

Having come to power as a Polish vassal in 1665, Right-bank hetman Petro Doroshenko eventually switched alliances and pledged allegiance to the Ottoman Empire in 1669. After defeating Poland in 1672, the Ottomans annexed the Podolia Eyalet and placed Bratslav and southern parts of Kyiv Voivodeship under their protection. The weakening of the Polish-Lithuanian Commonwealth was exploited by Left-bank Cossack hetman Ivan Samoilovych and his Russian ally, voivode Grigory Romodanovsky, who in early 1674 invaded the Right Bank and attacked the forces of Doroshenko and his Ottoman and Crimean Tatar allies. After Polish troops of Jan Sobieski reinvaded the area in autumn of the same year, mass flight of the local population began.

== Resettlement ==
Following the Ottoman sieges of Ladyzhyn and Uman, during which the local population suffered greatly, numerous inhabitants started fleeing from the surrounding areas. Throughout 1674 and 1675, almost the entire population of Bratslav and Uman regiments migrated to the Left Bank, Volhynia, Galicia and Sloboda Ukraine. In addition to spontaneous migration, many local inhabitants were forcibly deported on the orders of Samoilovych, who aimed to deprive Doroshenko of people and resources. In 1674 Samoilovych's forces and their Muscovite allies razed Cherkasy, moving the local population into the Left Bank as Doroshenko's troops advanced on the city. In 1675 a similar fate awaited the inhabitants of the town of Moshny.

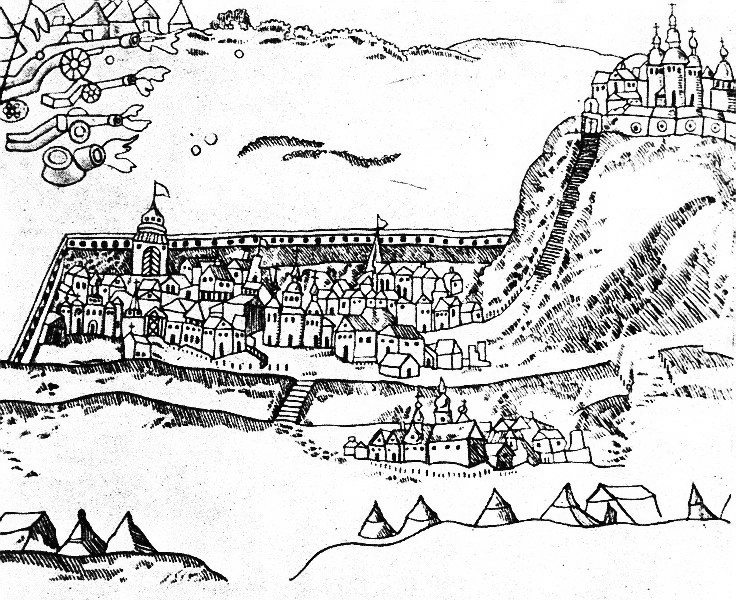
Depiction of the Ottoman siege of Chyhyryn in 1678

Following Doroshenko's capitulation in 1676, Muscovite troops stayed in Right-bank Ukraine, which was officially recognized part of the Ottoman Empire according to the Treaty of Zurawno. This resulted in a new war, which culminated in the destruction of the Cossack capital in Chyhyryn and its capture by Turkish troops in 1678. Pressured by Ottoman forces, Samoilovych was urged by Muscovite voivodes to continue the resettlement action with the aim of removing the Right-bank population to Left-bank and Sloboda Ukraine.

Between 1678 and 1679 the surviving settlements along the Dnieper were burned down. The cities of Cherkasy, Kaniv, Korsun and Rzhyshchiv were razed, and their inhabitants transferred to Left-bank Ukraine along with the populations of surrounding villages. Left-bank Hetman Samoilovych reported to Moscow in 1679:

"All the inhabitants of Rzhyshchiv, Kaniv, Korsun, Starobor, Moshny, Drabiv, Bilozer, Tahankiv, and Cherkasy were driven to this side and removed from the enemy, and the towns and their villages, small towns, and hamlets where they formerly lived on that side were all burned down."

As a result, the territory of Right-bank Ukraine became largely deserted. In some cases, local population resisted forced expulsion, as a result of which Left-bank forces would take their cities by force. Upon their resettlement to Left-bank Ukraine, the deportees were forbidden from returning to their native areas. According to Samoilovych's personal order, all people who attempted to cross the Dnieper were to be deprived of their property or even killed. Special forces commanded by colonel Illia Novytsky were placed along the river in order to control the popular movement and send those accused of attempting to flee to the hetman's residence in Baturyn. In some cases, Samoilovych would resort to firing local officials who were unable to prevent deportees from leaving the territory under their command.

== Aftermath ==
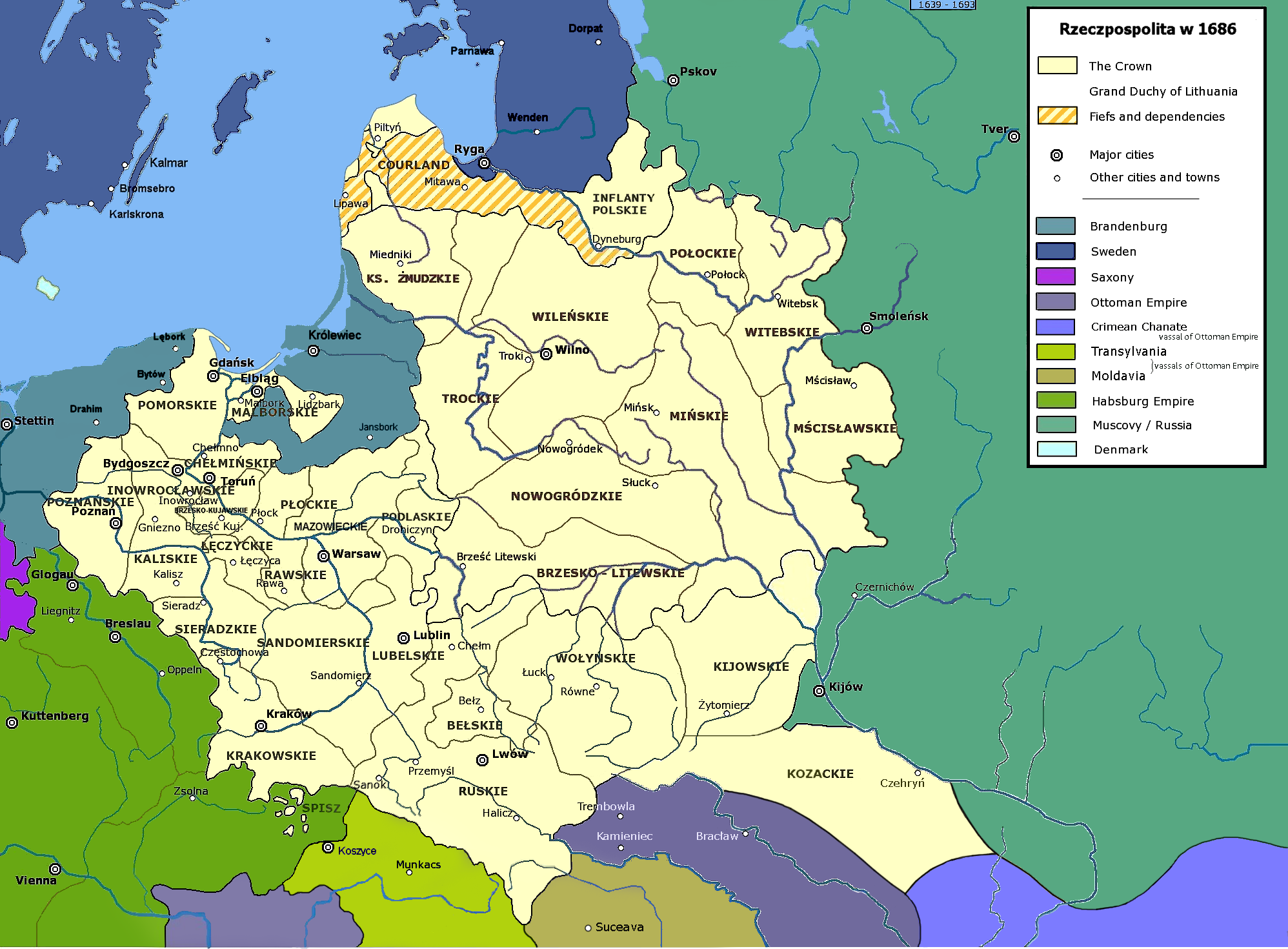
Map of the Polish-Lithuanian Commonwealth following the 1686 Eternal Peace Treaty, including the previously Cossack-ruled territories of Right-bank Ukraine to the south of Kyiv, which were to remain free of population and serve as a buffer zone.

In 1681 Muscovy and the Ottoman Empire concluded the Treaty of Bakhchisaray, according to which both parties agreed to a 20-year armistice. According to the provisions of the treaty, a buffer zone with no settled population was to be established in parts of central Ukraine between the Southern Buh and Dnieper rivers, separating Ottoman-held Podolia and Bratslav from the Muscovite-ruled Left Bank. The same provision was included into the 1686 Treaty of Eternal Peace between the tsar and Polish king, which stated that the territory between Kyiv and Chyhyryn was to remain deserted and not controlled by any side.

The devastation of Right-bank Ukraine, the cradle of Dnieper Cossacks, was lamented by Ukrainian chronicler Samiilo Velychko, who compared the event to the fall of Babylon. According to him, at that time the whole territory west of Bila Tserkva was covered with ruins and populated only by wild animals. The damage to Podolia, which used to be a major grain producer before the war, was such that the Ottoman garrison of Kamianets had to be supplied with products from Moldavia. The area of Bar had lost all of its population, except for a group of semi-nomadic Tatars. Trade movement in the area ceased, except for Turkish-convoyed caravans connecting Kamianets and Sharhorod. Contemporary reports claimed, that a project of Dutch recolonization of the areas was issued to the Polish king, but his government declined it. In his memoirs published in 1699 in Paris, a French traveller compared the state of Dnieper Ukraine after the numerous wars which had taken place in its territory to a "broad desert", claiming that only a few cities in the vicinity of the Polish border remained intact. He also noted that the loss of Cossack sovereignty was a consequence of that devastation.

The plundering of the Right Bank damaged Samoilovych's popularity, forcing the hetman to distance himself from Moscow and eventually leading to his overthrow in 1687. Following the treaties of Karlowitz and Adrianople, which returned Right-bank Ukraine under the rule of Poland-Lithuania, between late 1713 and early 1714 disengaging Russian forces performed another expulsion of the local population into Left-bank Ukraine.

== Legacy ==
Expulsion of local inhabitants from the area of Right-bank Ukraine contributed to the establishment of new settlements in Sloboda Ukraine and lands of the Poltava Regiment. Among those who moved to the Left Bank in course of the campaign was the famous otaman Ivan Sirko and representatives of well-known Cossack families such as Doroshenko, Skoropadsky, Galagan, Lyzohub, Khanenko, Hohol and Kochubey.

In the opinion of some linguists, the mass eastward movement of population from Right-bank Ukraine during the second part of the 17th century led to the intermixing of previously established dialects and contributed to the establishment of a single eastern variety of the Ukrainian language.

== Bibliography ==
- Yakovenko, Natalia (2006). An Outline History of Medieval and Early Modern Ukraine. Krytyka. pp. 393–398, 428. ISBN 9667679829.
- Magocsi, Paul Robert (1996). A History of Ukraine. University of Toronto Press. ISBN 0-8020-7820-6.
- Plokhy, Serhii (2022). The Gates of Europe: A History of Ukraine. New York, NY: Basic Books. p. 414. ISBN 978-0-465-07394-8.
- Tairova-Yakovleva, Tatiana (2020). Ivan Mazepa and the Russian Empire (PDF). Montreal Kingston London Chicago: McGill-Queen's Press. p. 425. ISBN 978-0-2280-0309-0.
