= Chyhyryn Regiment =

Chyhyryn Regiment Чигиринський полк
- Active: 1625–1712
- Country: Cossack Hetmanate
- Type: Cossack Regiment
- Size: 19 sotnias, 3222 Cossacks (1649)
- Garrison/HQ: Chyhyryn, Right-bank Ukraine
- Engagements: Khmelnytsky Uprising; Polish–Cossack–Tatar War; Chyhyryn Campaigns

Commanders
- Notable commanders: Mykhailo Krychevsky; Ivan Bohun; Petro Doroshenko

The Chyhyryn Regiment (Ukrainian: Чигиринський полк) was one of the seventeen territorial-administrative subdivisions of the Hetman State. The regiment's capital was the city of Chyhyryn, now in the Cherkasy Oblast of central Ukraine. The military units of the regiment were also known as the Hetman's Guard serving as personal guards of the Hetman of the Zaporozhian Host in 1648–1676.

== History ==
The regiment was created as a result of the Treaty of Kurukove, between the Zaporozhian Cossacks and the Polish–Lithuanian Commonwealth which led the establishment of six regiments of Registered cossacks that existed before the Khmelnytsky Uprising. The regiment occupied territory on both sides of the Dnieper River having eleven companies on the Right-bank Ukraine and eight on the Left-bank Ukraine. In the east it bordered the Korsun Regiment, on the north of the right-bank the Cherkasy Regiment, and on the north side of the left-bank the Kropyvna Regiment. When the Khmelnytsky uprising occurred the regiment became part of the Cossack Hetmanate, where the city of Chyhyryn served as the first capital of the Hetmanate and the official residence of the hetman. Following the signing of the Treaty of Zboriv in 1649, it consisted of a total of 19 sotnias and had 3,222 registered Cossacks.

When a civil war emerged among the cossacks, the Hetmanate was split along the Dnieper River into Left-Bank Ukraine and Right-Bank Ukraine, which placed the regiment under the control of Right-bank Ukraine hetmans. After the Treaty of Andrusovo in 1667, the Right-bank Ukraine and its regiments came under the administration of Poland; while the left-bank companies of the Chyhyryn regiment were transferred to the Myrhorod regiment. During the hetmancy of Petro Doroshenko the southern portion of the Right-bank Ukraine became a Turkish protectorate under the administration of Doroshenko with Chyhyryn as its capital. Following the signing of the Treaty of Karlowitz, Polish authority was reinstated on the territory in 1699.

Chyhyryn Regiment Чигиринський полк (Ukrainian)
- Regiment of Cossack Hetmanate
- 1648–1712
- Coat of arms

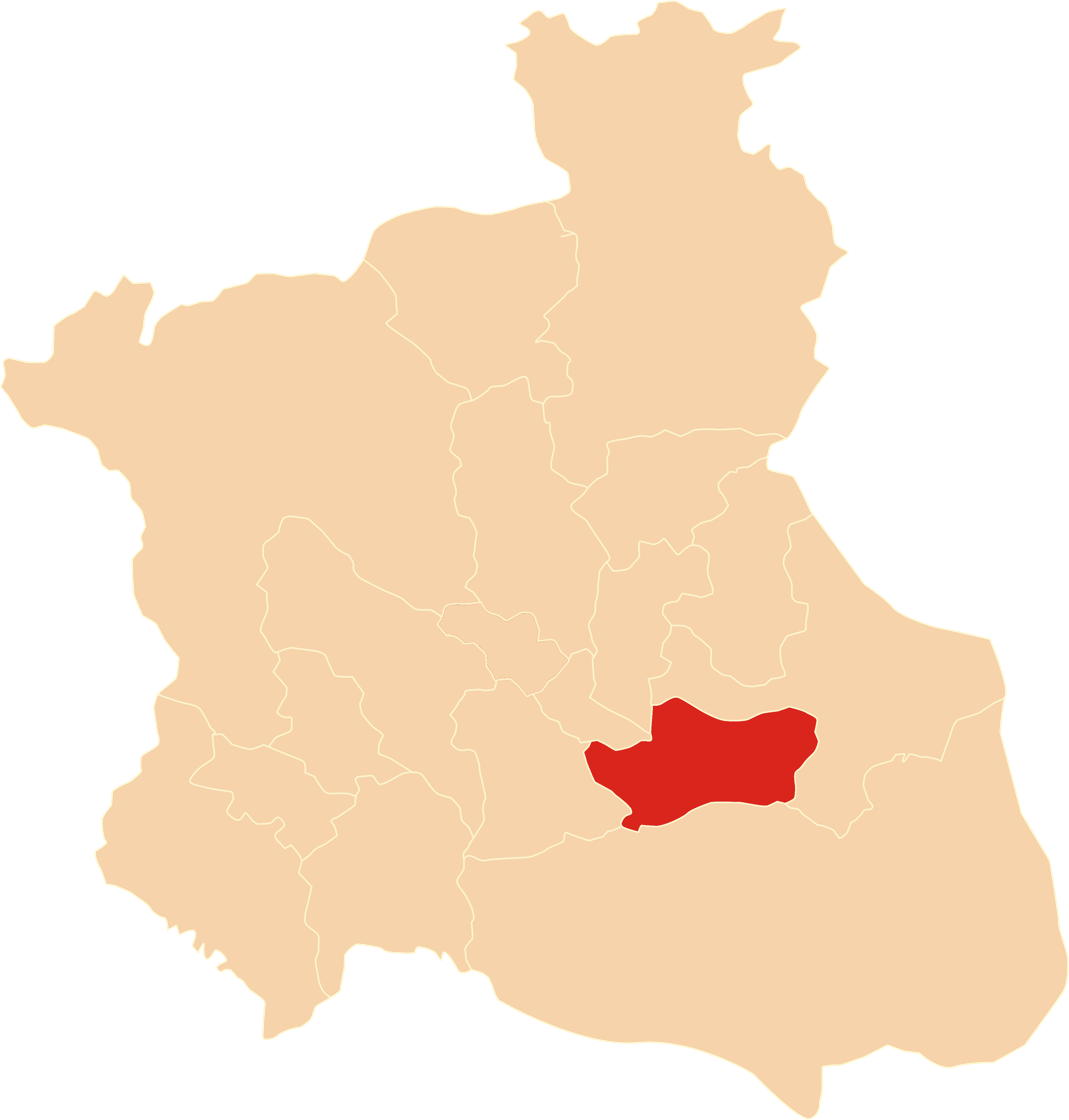
- The Chyhyryn Regiment (red) in the Cossack Hetmanate in 1660
- Capital: Chyhyryn
- History
  - Khmelnytsky Uprising: 1648
  - Treaty of the Pruth: 1712
Preceded by	Succeeded by
Kiev Voivodeship	Kiev Governorate
- Today part of: Ukraine

The regiment came under the jurisdiction of Ivan Mazepa in 1704, who reunited both banks under his rule during the Great Northern War, but was dissolved in 1712 when the territory was returned to the Polish–Lithuanian Commonwealth and its population was transferred to Left-Bank Ukraine.

== Structure ==
According to the 1649 Registry of the Zaporozhian Host the regiment included 18 sotnias and one kurin. The following sotnias were listed:

=== Right-bank Ukraine ===
- Kryliv
- Voroniv
- Buzhyn
- Borovytsia
- Medvedivka
- Zhabotyn
- Smila
- Oloviatyn
- Bakly
- Orlivka

=== Left-bank Ukraine ===
- Veremiivka
- Zhovnyn
- Maksymivka
- Kremenchuk
- Potik
- Omelnyk
- Hovtva
- Ostapivka
