= Kremenchuk Regiment =

Kremenchuk Regiment Кременчуцький полк
- Active: 1661–1663
- Country: Cossack Hetmanate
- Allegiance: Yakym Somko; Petro Doroshenko; Ivan Briukhovetsky
- Type: Cossack Regiment
- Role: Provide military support for Yakym Somko ascent to power
- Size: 21 sotnias
- Garrison/HQ: Kremenchuk, Ukraine

Commanders
- Notable commanders: Kyrylo Andrievych; Havrylo Dybovyk; Kostiantyn Havrylenko

The Kremenchuk Regiment (Ukrainian: Кременчуцький полк, romanized: Kremenchutskyi polk) was one of ten territorial-administrative subdivisions of the Cossack Hetmanate. The regiment's capital was the city of Kremenchuk, now in Poltava Oblast of central Ukraine.

The Kremenchuk Regiment was founded in 1661. The regiment was created by Yakym Somko in order to keep control over the Poltava region. Later the regiment was loyal to Petro Doroshenko and after him to Ivan Briukhovetsky.

The Kremenchuk regiment comprised already existing sotnias of Chyhyryn, Poltava, Myrhorod, Lubny regiments. After its abolishment in 1663, all of the sotnias went back to their original regiments.

== Structure ==
- Bahachanska (Velykobahachanska)
- Balakliiska
- Bilotserkivska
- Birkivska
- Chyhyryn-Dibrovska
- Hovtvianska
- Horodychshenska
- Kyshenkivska
- Kobeliatska
- Lukimska
- Maksymivska
- Manzheliivska
- Novosanzharska
- Omelnytska
- Ostapivska
- Perevolochanska
- Pototska
- Ustynivska
- Veremiivska
- Zhovnynska

== Commanders ==
- Kyrylo Andrievych – 1661
- Havrylo Dybovyk (Dybovytskyi) – August 25, 1661 – March 20, 1662
- Kostiantyn Havrylenko – March 27, 1662 – April 15, 1662
- Sava Kanivets – April 22, 1662 – April 26, 1662
- Kudlai – August 6, 1664
