= Zhyvotiv Regiment =

Zhyvotiv Regiment Животівський полк
- Active: 1648 - 1649
- Country: Cossack Hetmanate
- Type: Cossack Regiment
- Size: 4 sotnias
- Garrison/HQ: Zhyvotiv, Ukraine
- Engagements: Khmelnytsky Uprising

The Zhyvotiv Regiment (Ukrainian: Животівський полк, romanized: Zhyvotivskyi polk) was one the territorial-administrative subdivisions of the Cossack Hetmanate. The regiment's capital was the city of Zhyvotiv, now a village in Vinnytsia Oblast of western and southwestern Ukraine.

Regiment was raised in 1648, during Khmelnytsky Uprising. Shortly after Treaty of Zboriv, in 1649, the regiment was disbanded. The regiments sotnias were all transferred to Kalnyk Regiment. In 1651 its former sotnias were transferred again to Pavoloch Regiment.

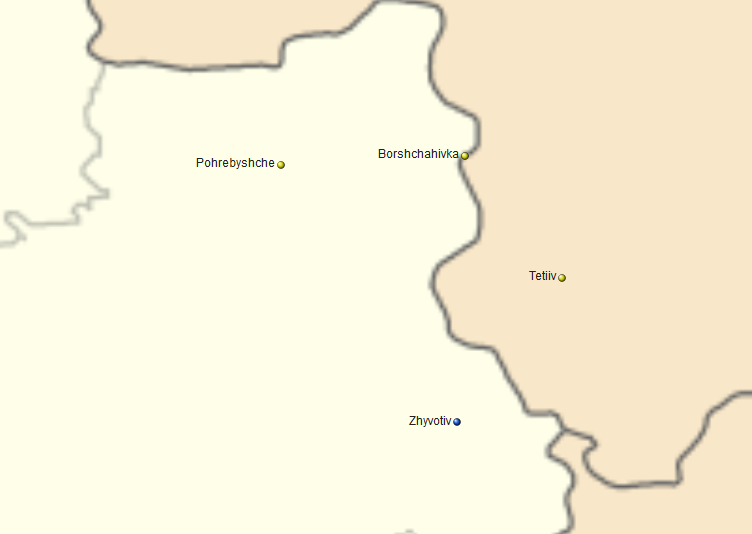
Zhyvotiv regiment sotnias location

== Structure ==
The regiment comprised 4 sotnias:

- Borshchahivka
- Pohrebyshche
- Tetiiv
- Zhyvotiv

== Sources ==
- Заруба, Віктор (2007), Адміністративно-територіальний устрій та адміністрація Війська Запорозького у 1648-1782 рр. [Administrative-territorial structure and administration of the Zaporizhzhya Army in 1648-1782.] (in Ukrainian), Dnipro: Lira, ISBN 978-966-383-095-7
- Bodyansky, Osip (1974), РЕЕСТРА ВСЕГО ВОЙСКА ЗАПОРОЖСКАГО ПОСЛѢ ЗБОРОВСКАГО ДОГОВОРА [Register of all Zaporozhian Host after Treaty of Zboriv] (in Russian), Moscow: Imperial Moscow University
