= Vinnytsia Regiment =

Kalnyk Regiment Кальницький полк Vinnytsia Regiment Вінницький полк
- Active: 1648–1712
- Country: Cossack Hetmanate
- Type: Cossack Regiment
- Size: 19 sotnias, 2050 Cossacks (1649)
- Garrison/HQ: Kalnyk (later Vinnytsia), Podolia
- Engagements: Khmelnytsky Uprising; Polish–Cossack–Tatar War; Pruth War

Commanders
- Notable commanders: Ivan Bohun; Ivan Sirko

Kalnyk Regiment Кальницький (Вінницький) полк (Ukrainian)
- Regiment of Cossack Hetmanate
- 1648–1712
- Coat of arms

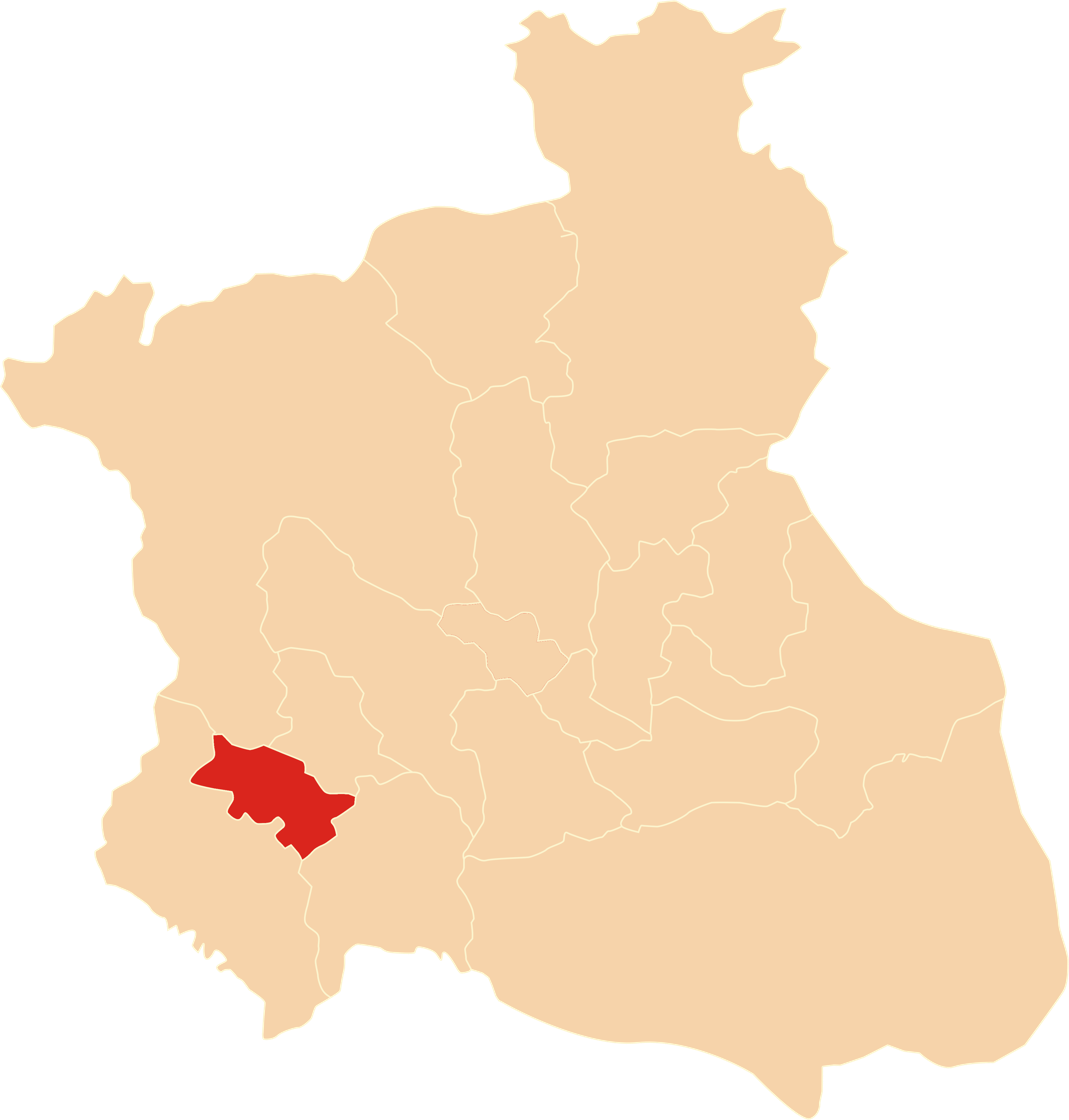
- The Kalnyk Regiment (red) in the Cossack Hetmanate in 1660
- Capital: Kalnyk, later Vinnytsia
- History
  - Khmelnytsky Uprising: 1648
  - Treaty of the Pruth: 1712
Preceded by	Succeeded by
Bratslav Voivodeship	Bratslav Voivodeship
- Today part of: Ukraine

Vinnytsia Regiment (Ukrainian: Вінницький полк), originally known as Kalnyk Regiment (Ukrainian: Кальницький полк), was an administrative division of the Cossack Hetmanate. Its administrative headquarters was initially based in Kalnyk (modern-day Vinnytsia Oblast), but later transferred to Vinnytsia.

== History ==
The regiment was mentioned in the Registry of the Zaporozhian Host compiled following the Treaty of Zboriv in 1649. In 1669 the regiment's Cossacks mutinied against hetman Petro Doroshenko, supporting his Zaporozhian Sich rival Petro Sukhoviy. After Doroshenko's fall from popularity, in 1675 the regiment recognized the rule of Polish-supported acting hetman Ostap Hohol. The regiment remained in the Polish sphere of influence until 1704. In 1711 the regiment's Cossacks joined the forces of Pylyp Orlyk during his campaign against the troops of Peter I of Russia; as a result, after Peter's counteroffensive they were deported to the Left-bank Ukraine.

== Administrative subdivisions ==
According to the 1649 registry, the regiment consisted of the following subdivisions:

- Sodorivka
- Zhyvotiv sotnia
- Borshchahivka sotnia
- Tetiiv sotnia
- Pohrebyshche sotnia
- Lypovets sotnia
- Balabanivka sotnia
- Illintsi sotnia
- Kunka sotnia
- Rakhnivka sotnia
- Dashiv sotnia
- Terlytsia sotnia
- Zhornyshche sotnia
- Umentyn sotnia
- Babyn sotnia
- Pryluka sotnia
- Vinnytsia sotnia
- Nemyriv sotnia
- Voronovytsia sotnia
