= Cherkasy Regiment =

Cherkasy Regiment Черкаський полк
- 1671 coat of arms of the regimental centre
- Active: 1625–1686
- Country: Cossack Hetmanate
- Type: Cossack Regiment
- Size: 18 sotnias, 2996 Cossacks (1649)
- Garrison/HQ: Cherkasy, Right-bank Ukraine
- Engagements: Khmelnytsky Uprising; Chyhyryn Campaigns

Cherkasy Regiment (Ukrainian: Черкаський полк) was a military unit and administrative subdivision of the Cossack Hetmanate centered in the city of Cherkasy. It existed between 1625 and 1686. After the 1667 Treaty of Andrusovo the regiment was incorporated by the Kingdom of Poland.

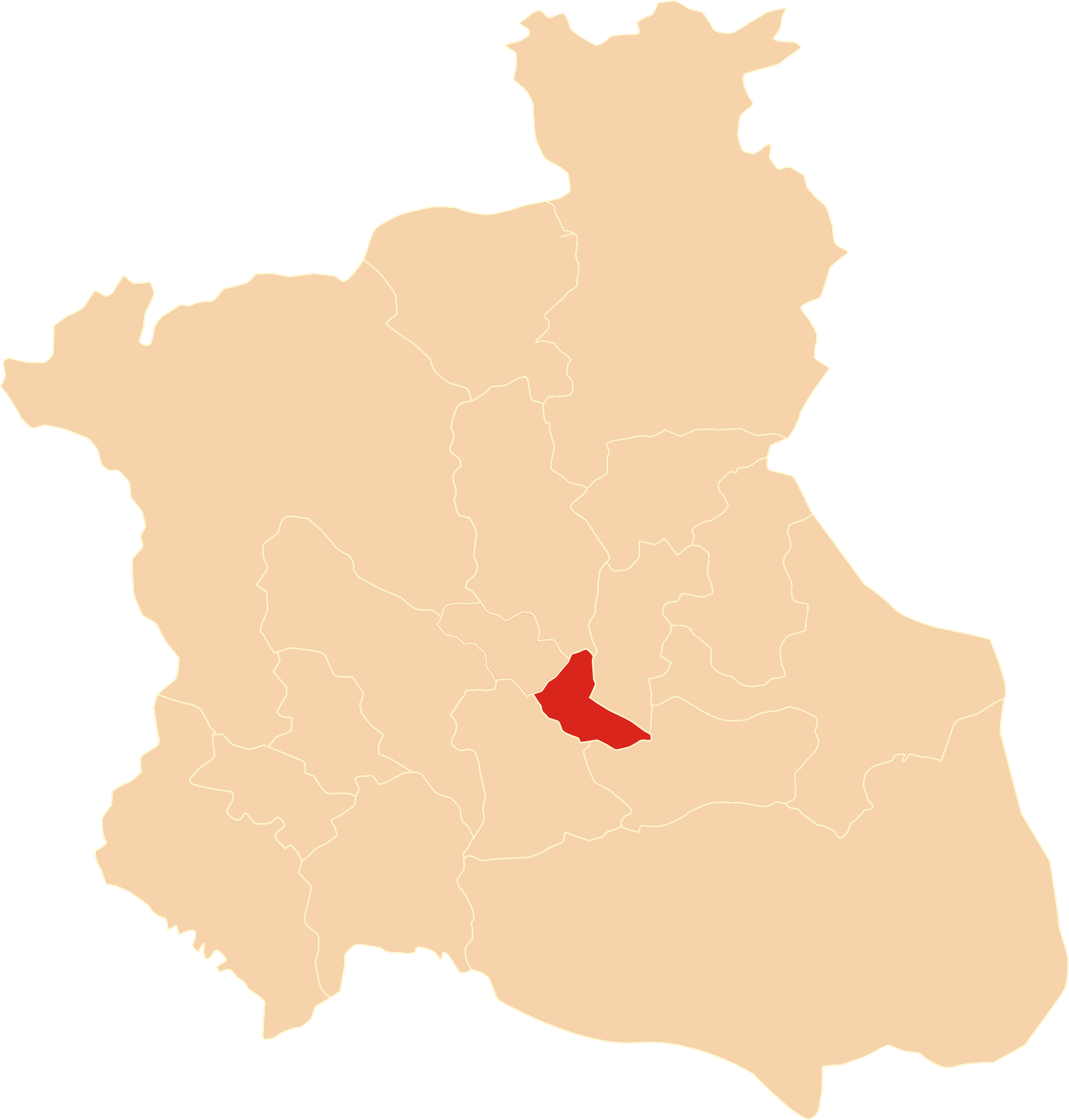
Location map of Cherkasy Regiment (red) in the Cossack Hetmanate, 1660

== History ==
The regiment was created in 1625 in the territories of Cherkasy starostvo. Its establishment took place according to the terms of Treaty of Kurukove. The regiment's formation was confirmed by the 1649 Treaty of Zboriv. In 1678-1679 the regiment's territory was devastated by troops of Moscow-allied hetman Ivan Samoilovych, who forcibly resettled the local population to Left-bank Ukraine, razing Cherkasy and other cities in the area.

== Administrative subdivisions ==
According to the 1649 Registry of the Zaporozhian Host, the regiment included following geographical subdivisions:

- Moshny sotnia
- Zolotonosha sotnia
- Domontiv sotnia
- Pishchanka sotnia

== Sources ==
- Yakowenko, Natalya (2006). An Outline History of Medieval and Early Modern Ukraine. Krytyka. ISBN 9667679829.
