= Kyiv Regiment (Cossack Hetmanate) =

Kyiv Regiment Київський полк
- Active: 1648–1782
- Country: Cossack Hetmanate
- Type: Cossack Regiment
- Size: 18 sotnias, 2010 Cossacks (1649)
- Garrison/HQ: Kyiv, later Kozelets
- Engagements: Khmelnytsky Uprising

Commanders
- Notable commanders: Mykhailo Krychevsky; Anton Zhdanovych; Alexander Bezborodko

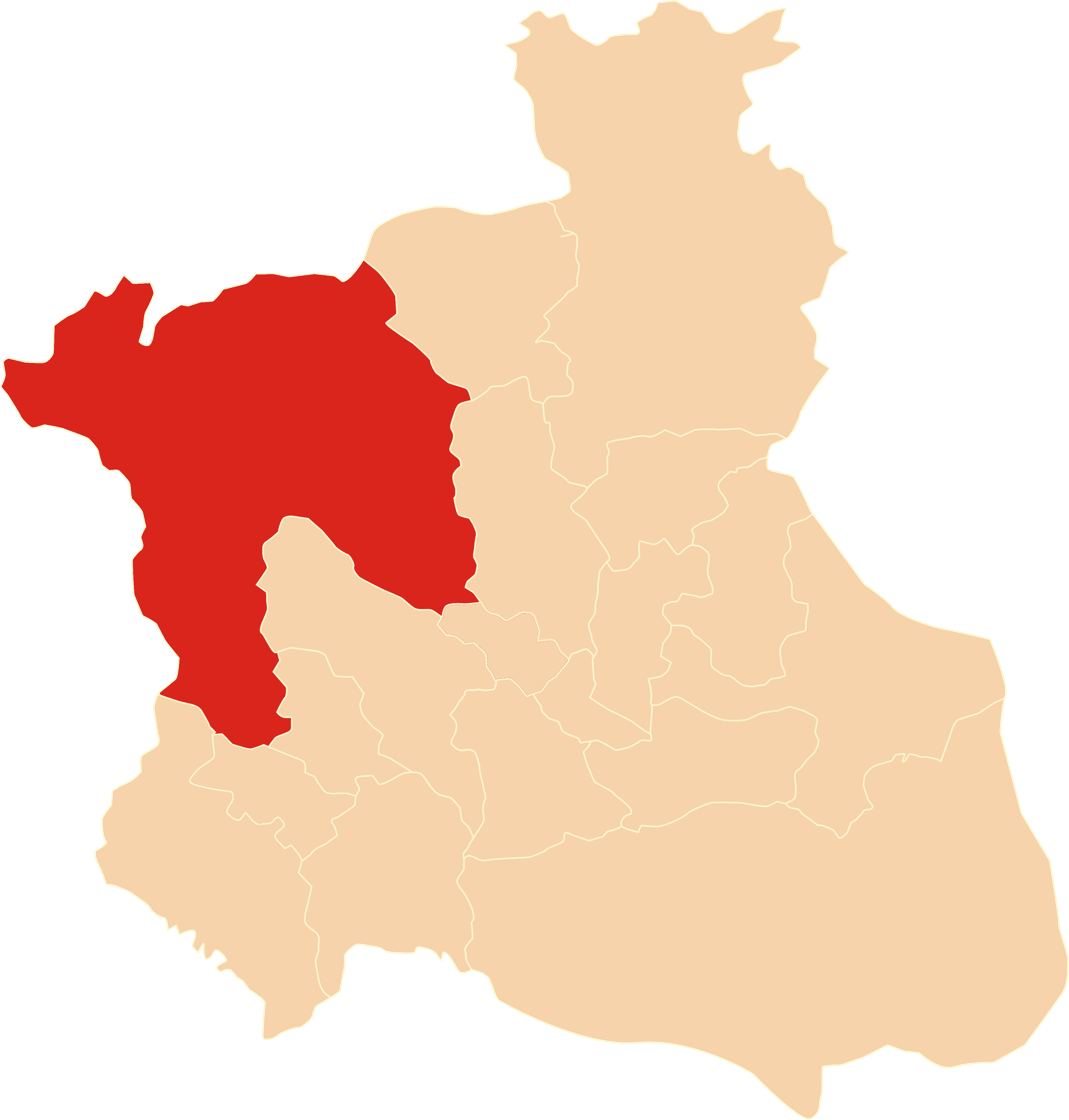
Location of Kyiv Regiment (red) in the Cossack Hetmanate, 1660

Kyiv Regiment (Ukrainian: Київський полк) served as one of the ten regiments of the Cossack Hetmanate during the 17th and 18th centuries.

The regiment was founded during the Khmelnytsky Uprising and was initially commanded by Mykhailo Krychevsky (died 1649) along with Chornobyl and Ovruch regiments. Its formation was officially conformed by the Treaty of Zboriv.

During the 18th century most of the regiment's territory was located in Left-bank Ukraine, and its administrative centre was moved to Kozelets.

== Administrative subdivisions ==
According to the 1649 Registry of the Zaporozhian Host, the regiment consisted of the following subdivisions:

- Kyiv sotnia
- Biletsky sotnia
- Hahirnyi sotnia
- Predrymyrsky (Pechersk) sotnia
- Vasylkiv sotnia
- Bilohorodka sotnia
- Khodosivka sotnia
- Trypillia sotnia
- Obukhiv sotnia
- Prevarka (Priorka) sotnia
- Hostomel sotnia
- Brovary sotnia
- Yasnohorodka sotnia
- Makariv sotnia
- Motovylivka sotnia
- Vorsivka sotnia
- Ovruch sotnia
