= Ichnia Regiment =

Ichnia Regiment Ічнянський полк
- Coat of Arms
- Active: 1648 - 1649
- Country: Cossack Hetmanate
- Type: Cossack Regiment
- Garrison/HQ: Ichnia, Ukraine
- Engagements: Khmelnytsky Uprising

The Ichnia Regiment (Ukrainian: Ічнянський полк, romanized: Ichnianskyi polk) was one of the territorial-administrative subdivisions of the Cossack Hetmanate. The regiment's capital was the city of Ichnia, now in Chernihiv Oblast of northern Ukraine.

Regiment was raised by colonel Petro Holovatskyi in and around the town of Ichnia in January 1648, during Khmelnytsky Uprising. Shortly after Treaty of Zboriv, in October 1649, the regiment was disbanded. The regiment was reduced to 2 sotnias which were then transferred to Pryluky Regiment.

== Commanders ==
All commanders were Colonels.

- Petro Holovatskyi 1648-1649
- Stepan Holovatskyi 1649

== Sources ==
- Заруба, Віктор (2007), Адміністративно-територіальний устрій та адміністрація Війська Запорозького у 1648-1782 рр. [Administrative-territorial structure and administration of the Zaporizhzhya Army in 1648-1782.] (in Ukrainian), Dnipro: Lira, ISBN 978-966-383-095-7
- Bodyansky, Osip (1974), РЕЕСТРА ВСЕГО ВОЙСКА ЗАПОРОЖСКАГО ПОСЛѢ ЗБОРОВСКАГО ДОГОВОРА [Register of all Zaporozhian Host after Treaty of Zboriv] (in Russian), Moscow: Imperial Moscow University
