= Old Pryluka =

Old Pryluka (pol. Przyłuka Stara, ukr. Стара Прилука) – a village in Ukraine, in the Lypovets Raion of Vinnytsia Oblast. Formerly a private magnate town — Przyłuka — owned by Janusz Zbaraski and situated in the Bracław Voivodeship; from 1627, it belonged to his son, Jerzy Zbaraski.
