= Trakhtemyriv =

Village in Cherkasy Oblast, Ukraine

Coordinates: 49°58′36″N 31°20′11″E

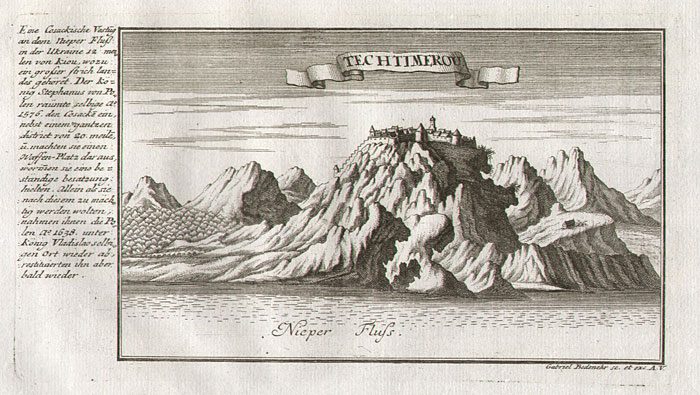
Depiction of Trakhtemyriv in the 16th century

Trakhtemyriv (Ukrainian: Трахтемирів [trɐxteˈmɪrʲiu̯]; Polish: Trechtymirów) is a small village in Cherkasy Raion, Cherkasy Oblast. It belongs to Bobrytsia rural hromada, one of the hromadas of Ukraine. In the past it was a city and quartered the Registered Cossacks of the Polish–Lithuanian Commonwealth since 1578. Part of the former city is submerged by the Kaniv Reservoir. The city also included a legendary settlement of Zarub that is mentioned in the Hypatian Chronicles of 1096 and 1168.

As of 2007 the village housed total of only 9 people. From around 2013 the village has no permanent population, and is inhabited mainly during the summer period. The village has no public electricity, water supply or canalisation.

Trakhtemyriv is located to the north of Kaniv.

== History ==
The first known owner of the territory where the village is located is starosta of Kaniv and Cherkasy Ostap Dashkevych who lived in the 16th century. After the death of Dashkevych, the settlement with its adjacent territories was transferred to the Kiev Cave Monastery. The transfer was confirmed by the King of Poland Sigismund I the Old. Soon thereafter Trakhtemyriv was raided and destroyed by Tatars. By the mid 16th century it was completely depopulated with a single monk staying at a local monastery. The Kiev Cave Monastery transferred the property to the administration of the Kiev Castle in 1545. In 1552 here were resettled seven families.

With the organization of Registered Cossacks of the Polish–Lithuanian Commonwealth in 1578 by the King of Poland Stephen Báthory, the city was given to the administration of the newly formed military force, while next to the local monastery was built a military hospital (1576).

In 1621 in the city of Trakhtemyriv stopped the Greek Orthodox Patriarch of Jerusalem Theophanes III of Jerusalem. Following the Pavlyuk Rebellion, Trakhtemyriv was destroyed by the Polish regular army in 1637 and once again by the Ottoman Turkey army in 1678.

Until 18 July 2020 Trakhtemyriv belonged to Kaniv Raion. The raion was abolished as part of the administrative reform of Ukraine, which reduced the number of raions of Cherkasy Oblast to four. The area of Kaniv Raion was merged into Cherkasy Raion.
