= Kurin =

Ukrainian military subdivision

Kurin (Ukrainian: курінь) has two definitions: a military and administrative unit of the Zaporozhian Cossacks, Black Sea Cossack Host, and others; and of a type of housing (see below).

In the administrative definition, a kurin usually consisted of a few hundred Cossacks, with their own land, treasury and flag, and around a hundred houses. The number of kurins was not permanent, and varied throughout time: during the 16th century, there were 8 kurins in the Zaporozhian Sich and 38 during the first half of the 18th century. All Cossacks had to be part of a kurin and were listed on the so-called "kurin komput" (a register of Cossacks in the kurin), and were subject to the kurin otaman.

In the other definition, a kurin is a type of housing, sometimes temporary, which can vary in size and purpose: from a small tent made of leaves, to a large wooden house for permanent occupation.

== Administrative unit ==
The kurin was the lowest administrative division in the Cossack Hetmanate. According to a Ukrainian historian Adrian Kashchenko, there were 38 kurins.

Subdivisions of the Cossack Hetmanate
First	Regiment	Ukrainian: полк, romanized: polk, pl. Ukrainian: полки, romanized: polky
Second	Sotnia	Ukrainian: сотня, romanized: sotnia, pl. Ukrainian: сотні, romanized: sotni
Third	Kurin	Ukrainian: курінь, romanized: kurin, pl. Ukrainian: курені, romanized: kureni

== Etymology ==
Kurin is most probably a loanword of Turkic origins. Compare Chagatai kürän ("group of warriors") and Uyghur kürijän ("warrior wagon train"). Other etymologies have been proposed – most prominently from the Ukrainian word курити, which means to smoke, create smoke – but they are generally not supported by linguists.

== In the Zaporozhian Sich ==
According to Dmytro Yavornytsky in his book "History of the Zaporozhian Cossacks" (Ukrainian: Історія запорізьких козаків), a kurin was a barrack 31 metres in length and 4 metres in width which was built out of lumber, with varying internal structures, or a military unit around the size of a regiment. Each kurin would have a small treasury building where cossacks would store valuables. Most cossacks did not live in the kurin they were counted in, rather choosing nearby villages, wilderness or other. The kurin were usually named after nearby towns, the otaman which founded them, or from the original hometowns of the resident cossacks. 10 kurins constituted a quarter of the whole Sich, and would be classified as a "pirija" - a special administrative unit with its own treasury, which was larger than in the individual kurins. According to the 1756 Zaporozhian Host Register there where 38 kurins with 12,758 Cossacks
