= Myrhorod Regiment =

Myrhorod Regiment Миргородський полк
- Coat of Arms
- Active: 1648–1782
- Country: Cossack Hetmanate
- Type: Cossack Regiment
- Size: 16 sotnias, 3009 Cossacks (1649)
- Garrison/HQ: Myrhorod, Ukraine
- Engagements: Azov campaigns

Commanders
- Notable commanders: Danylo Apostol

Myrhorod Regiment Миргородський полк (Ukrainian)
- Regiment of Cossack Hetmanate
- 1648–1782
- Coat of arms

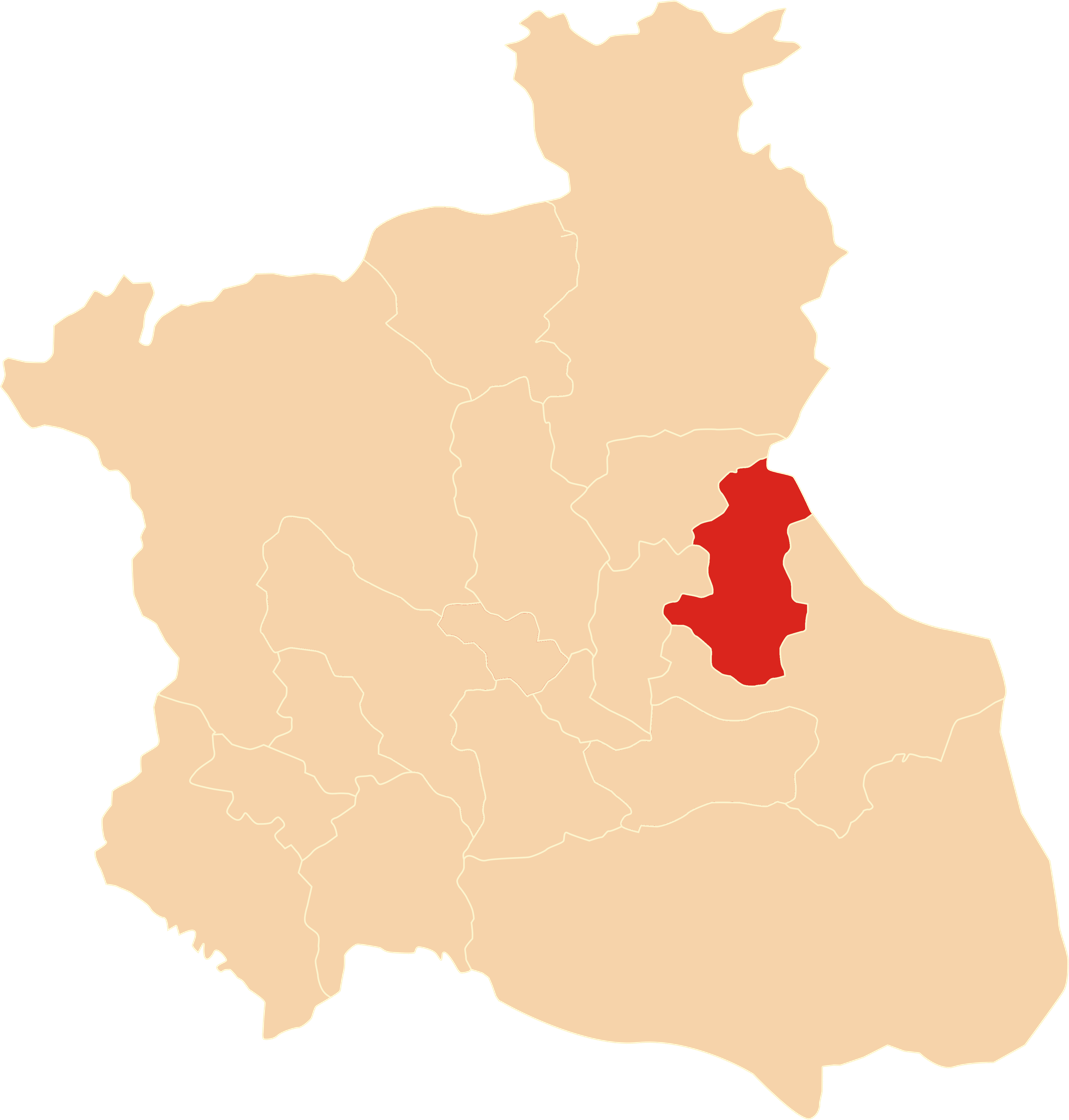
- Myrhorod Regiment (red) in the Cossack Hetmanate in 1660
- Capital: Myrhorod
- History
  - Khmelnytsky Uprising: 1648
  - Creation of Kiev Viceroyalty: 1782
Preceded by	Succeeded by
Kiev Voivodeship	Poltava Governorate
- Today part of: Ukraine

The Myrhorod Regiment (Ukrainian: Миргородський полк, romanized: Myrhorodskyi polk) was one of the 10 territorial-administrative subdivisions of the Cossack Hetmanate. The regiment's capital was the city of Myrhorod, now in Poltava Oblast of central Ukraine.

The Myrhorod Regiment was founded in 1648. In 1649 the territory of Lubny Regiment was annexed to the Myrhorod Regiment. At that time the Regiment consisted of 16 sotnias. In 1658 part of the Regiment became recreated Lubny Regiment. In 1672 a few sotnias from the Chyhyryn Regiment were added to the regiments numbers.

During the 1774–1775 years, 4 sotnias from the regiment were added to the Russian Novorossiya governorate.

In 1782 on the territories of the regiment were 12 towns and 1,271 villages. During this year the regiment was disbanded and all of its territories were annexed to the Kiev namestnichestvo.

== Structure ==
According to the 1649 Register of the Zaporozhian Host, the regiment consisted of 16 sotnias, including following geographical subdivisions:

- Krasnopillia sotnia
- Ustyvytsia sotnia
- Komyshanka sotnia
- Khorol sotnia
- Lubny sotnia (2)
- Romny sotnia
- Kostiantyniv sotnia
- Lokhvytsia sotnia
- Sencha sotnia
- Pankivka sotnia

During 1774–1775 the Regiment consisted of the following sotnias:

- Bila Tserkva
- Bahachka
- Hovtva
- Hradyzk
- Khorol
- Kremenchuk
- Myrhorod (2)
- Omelnyk
- Ostapivka
- Potoky
- Shyshaky
- Sorochyntsi
- Ustyvytsia
- Vlasivka
- Yaresky

== Commanders ==
- Matvii Hladkyi (1649–1652)
- Hryhorii Lisnytskyi (1653–1654, 1657–1658, 1660)
- Pavlo Apostol (1659, 1671, 1672–1683)
- Demian Apostol (1664–1666)
- Hryhorii Apostol (1666–1668)
- Hryhorii Hladkyi (1669–1670)
- Mykhailo Kyiashko (1670–1671)
- Danylo Apostol (1683–1727)
- Pavlo Apostol (1727–1736)
- Vasyl Kapnist (1737–1750)
