= Uman Regiment =

Uman Regiment Уманський полк
- Active: 1648-1686, 1704-1712
- Country: Cossack Hetmanate
- Type: Cossack Regiment
- Size: 14 sotnias, 2976 Cossacks (1649)
- Garrison/HQ: Uman, Right-bank Ukraine
- Engagements: Khmelnytsky Uprising; Russo-Turkish War (1676–1681); Great Northern War

Commanders
- Notable commanders: Mykhailo Khanenko

Uman Regiment Уманський полк (Ukrainian)
- Regiment of Cossack Hetmanate
- 1648–1712
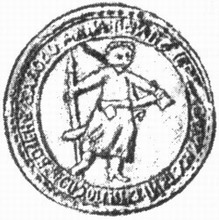
- Coat of arms

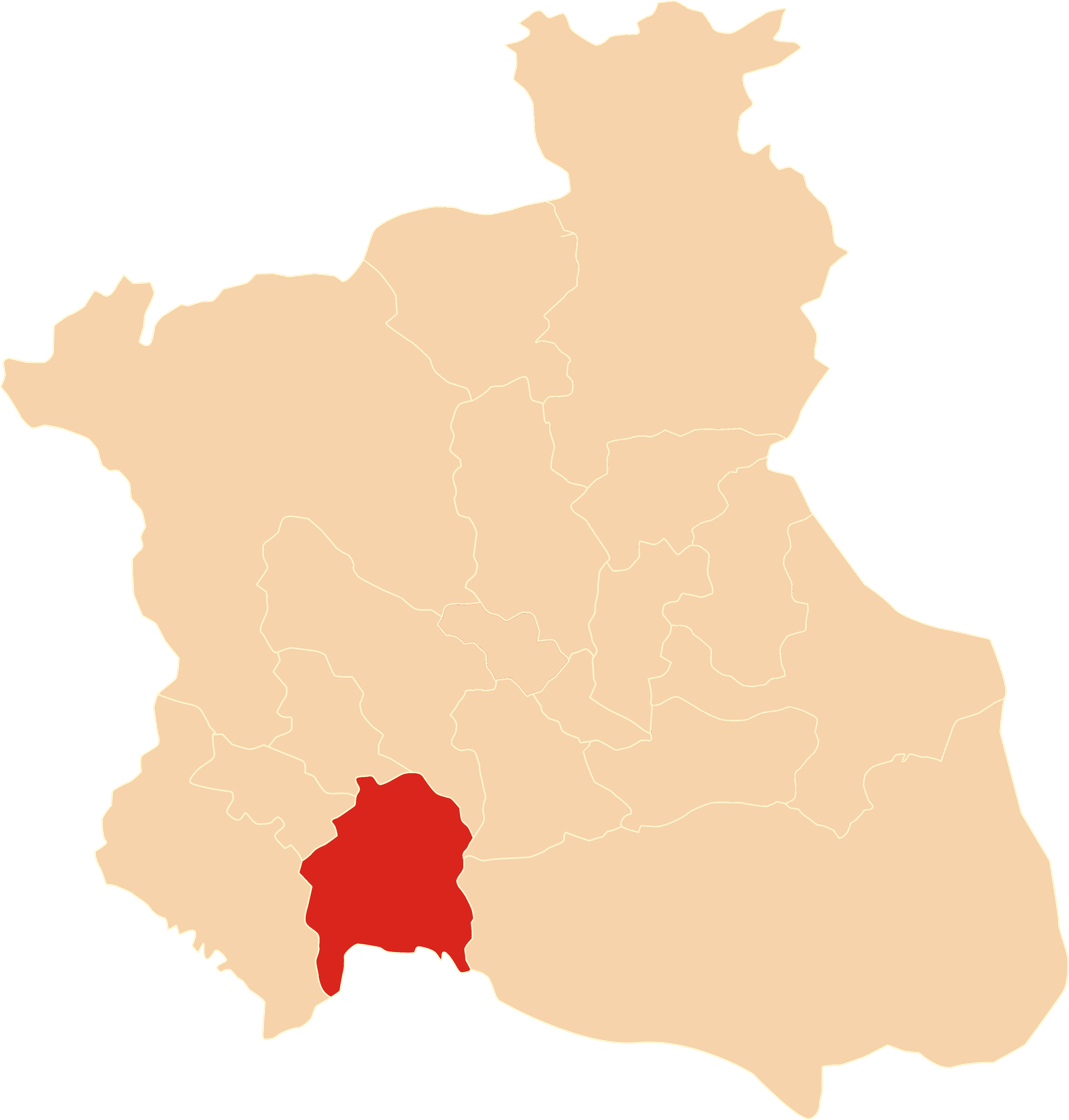
- The Uman Regiment (red) in the Cossack Hetmanate in 1660
- Capital: Uman
- History
  - Khmelnytsky Uprising: 1648
  - Treaty of the Pruth: 1712
Preceded by	Succeeded by
Bratslav Voivodeship	Bratslav Voivodeship
- Today part of: Ukraine

The Uman Regiment (Ukrainian: Уманський полк) was one of the seventeen territorial-administrative subdivisions of the Hetman State. But after the division of the Hetman State the regiment became part of the Right-bank Ukraine. The Regiment consisted of 13 sotnias. The regiment's capital was the city of Uman, now in Cherkasy Oblast of central Ukraine.

The regiment was established in 1648 at the outbreak of the Khmelnytsky Uprising. When the Ruin occurred the regiment was placed under the control of Right-bank hetmans. The regiment was split during the 1670s as a result of factional fighting between its colonel, Mykhailo Khanenko, and Hetman Petro Doroshenko, which caused half of the troops to join forces with invading Left-bank Cossacks. The regiment was eventually disbanded in 1686.

The regiment was recreated in 1704 under Ivan Mazepa who reunited both banks under his rule during the Great Northern War, but was dissolved in 1712 when the territory was returned to the Polish–Lithuanian Commonwealth.

== Administrative subdivisions ==
According to the 1649 Register of the Zaporozhian Host, the regiment consisted of following sotnias:

- Mankivka
- Ivanhorod
- Buzivka
- Babanka
- Bershad
- Kochubiivka
- Tsybuliv
- Ivany
- Butany
- Romanivka
- Kyslianka
- Sobolivka
- Ladyzhyn
