= Korsun Regiment =

Korsun Regiment Корсунський полк
- Coat of arms of the Korsun Regiment
- Active: 1625–1712
- Country: Cossack Hetmanate
- Type: Cossack Regiment
- Size: 19 sotnias, 3472 Cossacks (1649)
- Garrison/HQ: Korsun, Right-bank Ukraine
- Engagements: Khmelnytsky Uprising; Chyhyryn Campaigns; Great Turkish War

Commanders
- Notable commanders: Stanislav Morozenko

Korsun Regiment (Ukrainian: Корсунський полк) was a military unit and administrative subdivision of the Cossack Hetmanate centered in the city of Korsun. It existed between 1625 and 1712.

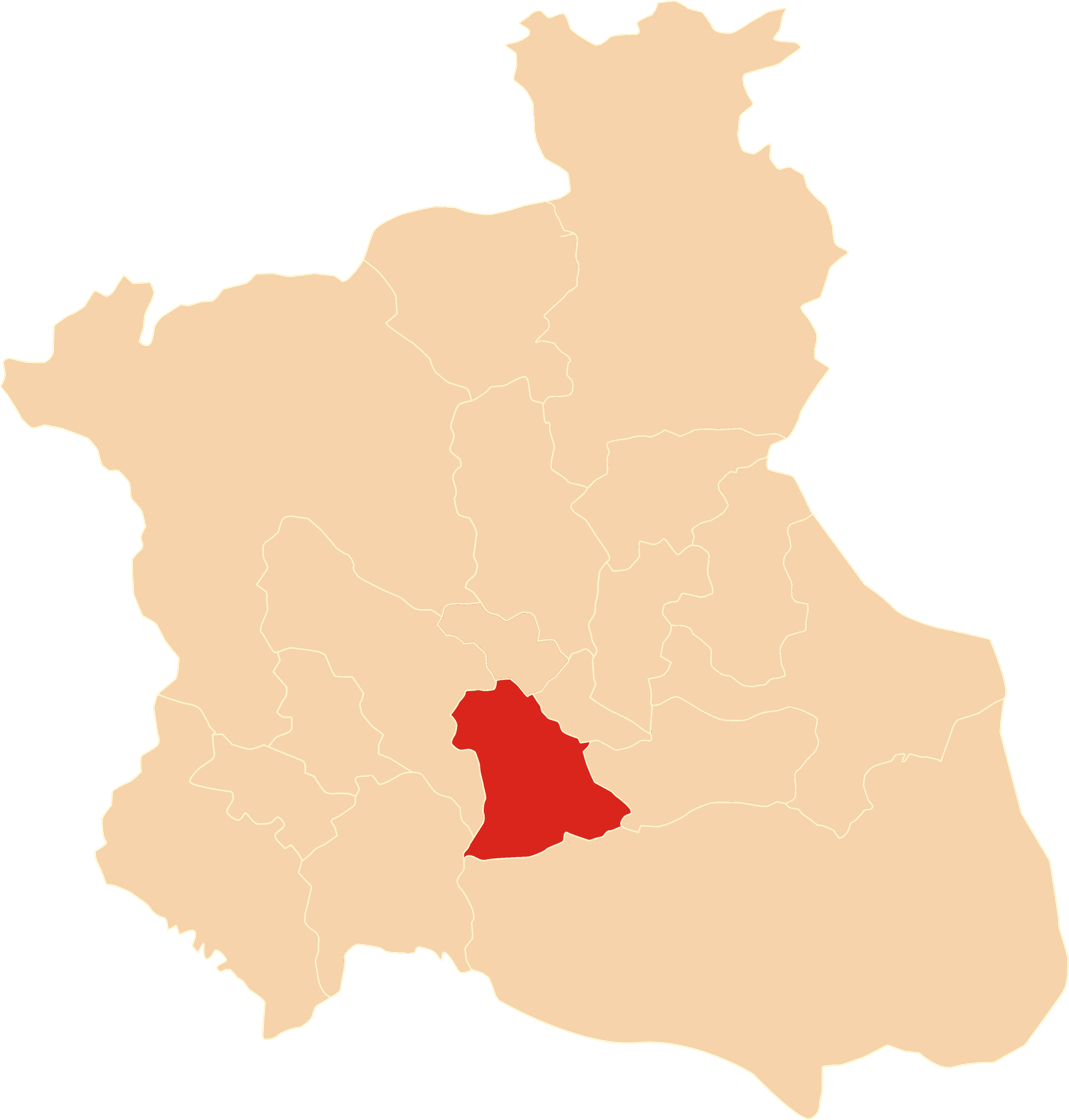
Location map of Korsun Regiment (red) in the Cossack Hetmanatem 1660

== History ==
The regiment was created in 1625 in the territories of Korsun starostvo. Its formation was confirmed by the 1649 Treaty of Zboriv. In 1654 the regiment had over 5,000 Cossacks in its ranks. In 1669 the regiment switched to the side of Petro Sukhoviy and mutinied against hetman Petro Doroshenko. In 1678-1679 the territory of Korsun Regiment was devastated by troops of pro-Moscow hetman Ivan Samoilovych, who burned down the regimental capital and forcibly resettled the local population to Left-bank Ukraine.

In 1681 the regiment was transferred under the rule of Moldavian ruler George Ducas, who restored the local Cossack administration by appointing an acting hetman. During the Great Turkish War the regiment returned under Polish rule, with the rights and freedoms of local Cossacks being confirmed by the Sejm. In 1711 the regiment's Cossacks and burghers supported the army of hetman Pylyp Orlyk, but after his retreat the local population was once again forcibly deported from the region by tsar Peter I.

== Administrative subdivisions ==
According to the 1649 Registry of the Zaporozhian Host, the regiment included following geographical subdivisions:

- Mliiv sotnia
- Lysianka sotnia
- Vilshana sotnia
- Sytnyky sotnia
