= Treaty of Zboriv =

1649 treaty between Poland and Cossacks

Зборівський договір (Ukrainian) Ugoda zborowska (Polish)
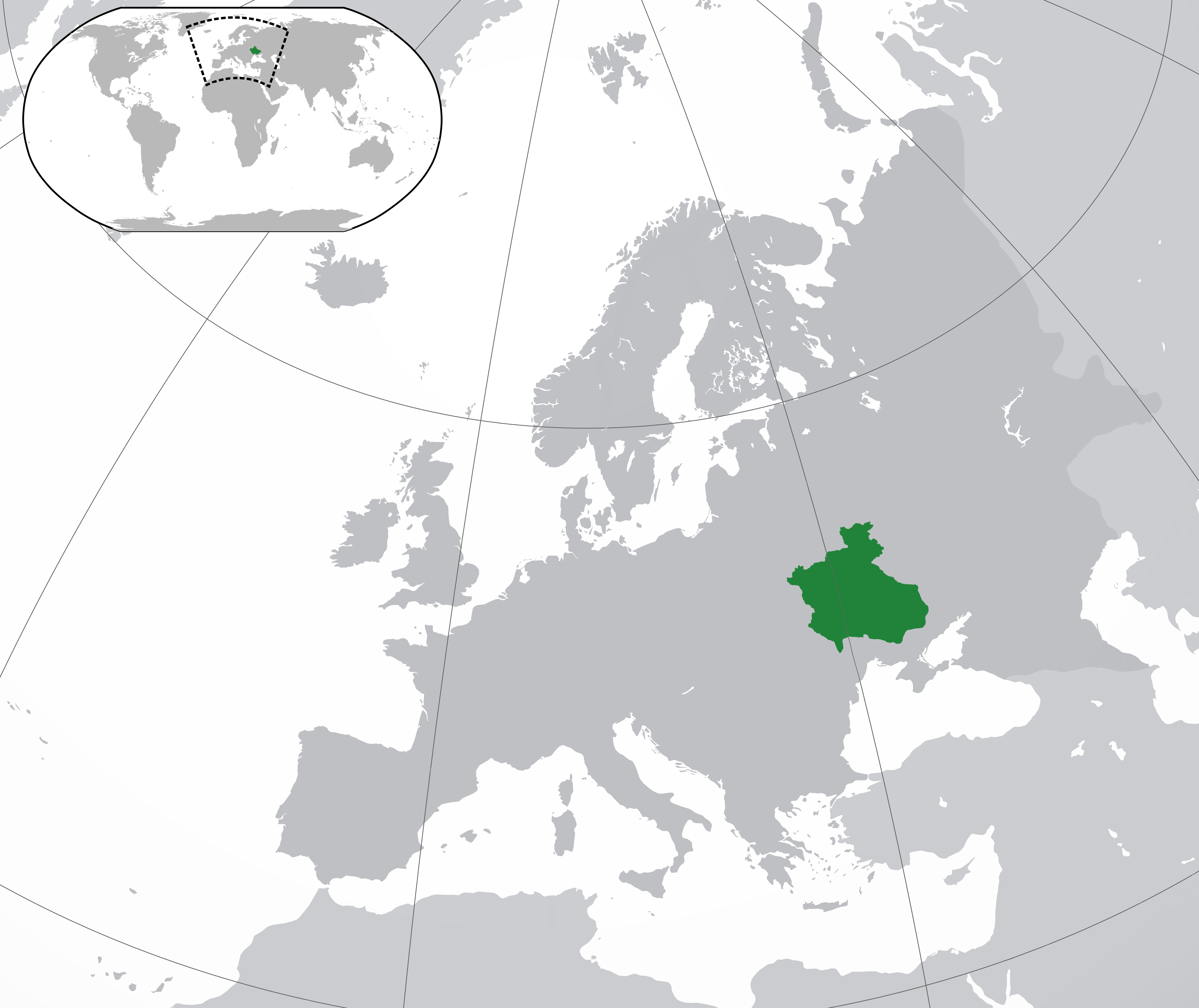
- Map of the borders of the Cossack Hetmanate according to the treaty
- Type: Peace treaty
- Context: Khmelnytsky Uprising
- Signed: 18 August 1649
- Location: Zboriv
- Negotiators: Polish–Lithuanian Commonwealth; Cossack Hetmanate

The Treaty of Zboriv was signed on 18 August 1649, after the Battle of Zboriv when the Crown forces of about 35,000, led by King John II Casimir of Poland, clashed against a combined force of Cossacks and Crimean Tatars, led by Hetman Bohdan Khmelnytsky and Khan İslâm III Giray of Crimea respectively, which numbered about 50,000.

The Treaty of Zboriv consisted of two separate agreements between Ukraine and the Commonwealth and between Crimea and the Commonwealth.

The Treaty of Zboriv plays an important role in history of Ukraine as it turned the former mutineers against the Polish–Lithuanian Commonwealth into citizens of a new political community.

== Signing parties ==
- Ukrainian side representatives: Bohdan Khmelnytskyi, Ivan Vyhovsky
- Polish side representatives: Adam Kysil, Jerzy Ossoliński, Janusz Radziwiłł, Władysław Dominik Zasławski

== Points of agreement ==
According to the concluded agreement:

- All freedoms of Zaporozhian Cossacks are retained
- The number of Registered Cossacks will be 40,000 and the preparation of the Register will be delegated to the Hetman of Zaporozhian Cossacks.
- The following cities will be allowed to accept Cossacks to the Register: on this side of Dnieper: from Dymer, Hornostaipil, Korostyshiv, Pavoloch, Pohrebyshche, Pryluka, Vinnytsia, Bratslav, Yampil to Dniester and on the other side of Dnieper: in Oster, Chernihiv, Nizhyn, Romny up to Muscovy border and also everywhere between Dnieper and Dniester.
- Everyone who want to be the Cossack may choose so, retaining all his property.
- The Register must be completed latest on the day of Intercession of the Theotokos.
- Chyhyryn will be the Host City of Zaporozhian Cossacks forever and now is given to Bohdan Khmelnytsky.
- Whatever has happened during the present confusion, by God's permission, all this is to be forgotten and no master is to take vengeance and punishment.
- All nobles, both Orthodox and Catholic, who joined Cossacks, it will be forgiven. All infamies will be cancelled.
- The Crown Forces are not allowed to be based in Cossack towns.
- Jews are not allowed to be citizens of Cossack towns.
- In the Kyiv Voivodeship, Bratslav Voivodeship and Chernihiv Voivodeship all offices can be held by Orthodox.
- In the city of Kiev, because there are privileged Ruthenian schools, the Jesuit fathers are not to be founded there and in other Ukrainian cities, but to be transferred somewhere else. And all other schools, which were there in ancient times, are to be preserved.

To summarize, the army of the Polish Crown, Uniates, and Jews were banned from the territory of the Kyiv Voivodeship, Bratslav Voivodeship, and Chernihiv Voivodeship; governmental offices in the Cossack Hetmanate could be held only by Eastern Orthodox nobility (either Polish or Ukrainian administration of Eastern Orthodox religion), the Orthodox Church was granted privileges and the Crimean Khanate was to be paid a large sum of money.

=== Borders of the Cossack Hetmanate ===
From the treaty text:

"Beginning from the Dnipro on this side [Right Bank] in Dymer, Hornostaipil, Korostyshiv, Pavoloch, Pohrebyshche, [Stara] Pryluka, Vinnytsia, and Bratslav, and from Bratslav to Yampil as far as the Dnister, and from the Dnister to the Dnipro... and on the other side [Left Bank] in Oster, Chernihiv, Romny, and Nizhyn, all the way to the Muscovite border and the Dnipro."

== Ratification by the Sejm ==
The treaty was solemnly ratified by the Sejm of the Commonwealth (which was in session between November 1649 and January 1650), on 22 November 1649:

"Approval of the declaration of our grace granted to our Zaporizhian Army.
13. Since, in accordance with the constitution of our auspicious Coronation, sufficient measures have been taken to pacify the Zaporizhian Cossacks, we hereby approve this declaration of our grace, made at Zboriv to the Zaporizhian Army, authoritate Conventus praesentis [by the authority of the present Convention], with the consent of all the Estates."

18th-century copy of the Treaty of Zboriv in Polish, kept at CSHAK (click for full PDF).

Ratification of the Treaty of Zboriv (18 August 1649) by the Sejm of the Commonwealth on 22 November 1649.

== Outcome ==
However, hostilities resumed when Catholic bishops refused to recognise the provisions of the treaty (admission to the Senate of the Orthodox metropolitan of Kyiv, Sylvestr Kosiv).

== See also ==
- Khmelnytsky's campaign of 1648
- List of treaties
- The Ruin (Ukrainian history)

== Bibliography ==
- Arkadii Zhukovsky. Zboriv, Treaty of. Encyclopedia of Ukraine, vol. 5 (1993).
- Kohut, Zenon E. (2009). "Mazepa's Ukraine: Understanding Cossack Territorial Vistas". Harvard Ukrainian Studies. 31 (1/4). Harvard Ukrainian Research Institute: 1–28. ISSN 0363-5570. JSTOR 41756495.
