= Sotnia =

Military unit in some Slavic countries

A sotnia (Ukrainian and Russian: сотня, lit. 'a hundred', Ukrainian pronunciation: [ˈsɔtʲnʲɐ], Russian pronunciation: [ˈsotʲnʲə]; Croatian: satnija) was a military unit and administrative division in some Slavic countries.

Sotnia, deriving back to 1248, has been used in a variety of contexts in both Ukraine and Russia to this day. It is a helpful word to create short names for groups including the Nebesna Sotnia and Terek Wolf Sotnia, stating that these groups do include 100–150 persons.

The military unit analog and most meaningful translation for the English-speaking world would be a company.

Its significance can be noticed by nationalist impact within the 16th-18th century Cossacks, Ukrainian People's Republic, Ukrainian National Army, and during Euromaidan.

Sotnia can also be referred to as half-sotnia which is a more diminutive unit of people. This typically consists of around 50 people.

== Croatia ==
During Second World War and the Croatian War of Independence, many Croatian units bore the name satnija, and their leaders were called satnici (singular: satnik). This rank still exists in the Croatian army and is equivalent to a captain.

== Russia ==
=== Don Cossacks ===
In 1906, Russia faced eighteen months of revolutionary turmoil. The Cossacks played a large role in becoming one of the most feared defenders. Discontent steadily merged late that summer, causing an increase in unrest for workers and peasants within the Russian Empire. Between May and August, fifteen Don Cossacks units mutinied.

Cossacks of the second Sotnia carried out a large group of numbers in meetings to avoid dispersing the mob. Several meetings were made and a report was made listing other incidents of the same regiment. Concluding that all the Cossacks of the Taganrog have been seen as unreliable.

Cossacks started an internal police service. They depicted themselves a heroic warriors and defender of the fatherland. The group carried out many terrorist operations. Cossacks would break up in smaller units, referring to half-sotnias. They used campaigns that were unparalleled in its brutality and scope, the morale of the Cossacks became to decrease.

=== Sotnia Cavalry ===
In the mid-1880s, Russia, Germany, Austria, and France worked together to create peace, with 1,772 squadrons and sotnias of Cavalry. They increased the numbers higher. A large amount of numbers of cavalry, became the most expensive if all arms, and the weighty on the badgers of each country. Sotnia cavalry can also refer to the animals the soldiers who rode horseback, in military context.

=== Black Hundreds ===
In Russian history, sotnya (see Сотня) was also a unit of some other (civil) organizations, such as the Black Hundreds.

=== Terek Wolf Sotnia ===
Russian nationalism and Russian Monarchism has been increasing since the fall of the Soviet Union. By April 2014, Russian Special Forces were operating in Ukraine to destabilise the country. These were known as the Terek Wolf Sotnia, is a group of members who have been identified as mysterious and ideologically questionable. Their profiles can be identified seen as V shape insignia of black green and red tricolor. Including ahead of a wolf in front. The disguised men appear to be Russian citizens, however others claim to be natives of Crimea or from Eastern Ukraine. These men all share similar commonalities, claiming to be fascist and ultra-nationalist, claiming to defend Eastern Ukraine from fascists operating in Ukraine.

Tikhon Karetniy is a Russian member of the Belorechensk Cossack community. Photos were posted to the community showing his involvement in the seizures in Sloviansk also known as the "Terek Wolf Sotnia".

== Ukraine ==
=== Cossacks ===
Map of Kyiv Sotnia of Kyiv Regiment during the 18th century

Subdivisions of the Cossack Hetmanate
| First | Regiment | Ukrainian: полк, romanized: polk, pl. Ukrainian: полки, romanized: polky |
| Second | Sotnia | Ukrainian: сотня, romanized: sotnia, pl. Ukrainian: сотні, romanized: sotni |
| Third | Kurin | Ukrainian: курінь, romanized: kurin, pl. Ukrainian: курені, romanized: kureni |

As a unit of the Cossack regiments, it is known from the earliest records of the Zaporizhian Sich.

During the Cossack service in the Imperial Russian Armies the typical regiment had five sotnias or squadrons. The term was used in the context of Cossack foot or cavalry regiments. The unit term was retained until the establishment of Soviet Union in 1922 and termination of the Ukrainian People's Republic and Free Don Cossack Oblast.

=== Historical Ukrainian armies ===
==== Ukrainian Insurgent Army ====
Before and during the Second World War the word kurin was commonly used alongside sotnia. It was a term referring to the basic combat unit of the Ukrainian Insurgent Army (UPA) and was equivalent to a battalion around four to eight hundred member each divided into three to four sotnias.

==== Ukrainian National Army ====
In the Ukrainian National Army (fighting as part of the armed forces of Nazi Germany at the end of World War II), each sotnia contained three or four chotas (singular chota, lit. transl. count – transl. platoons) and each chota comprised three riys (singular riy [Ukrainian], literally "a swarm"; a section or reinforced squad of 10 to 12 men). Every riy usually had one light machine gun, two or three other special weapons, and at least seven assault rifles.

=== Modern Ukraine ===
==== Nebesna Sotnia (Heavenly Hundred) ====
In the wake of the 2014 invasion of Ukraine by Russia, which killed around 20,000 Ukrainians, the Ukrainian heroes became known as the "Heavenly Hundred" (Ukrainian: небесна сотня, nebesna sotnia). Nebesna being defined as heavenly, in the sense that there is a link with Heaven or God. Sotnia defined as hundreds, refers back to the military units established by Cossacks. Heavenly Hundred can be understood as the "legion of those who went to heaven" or "the legion of those who went to God".

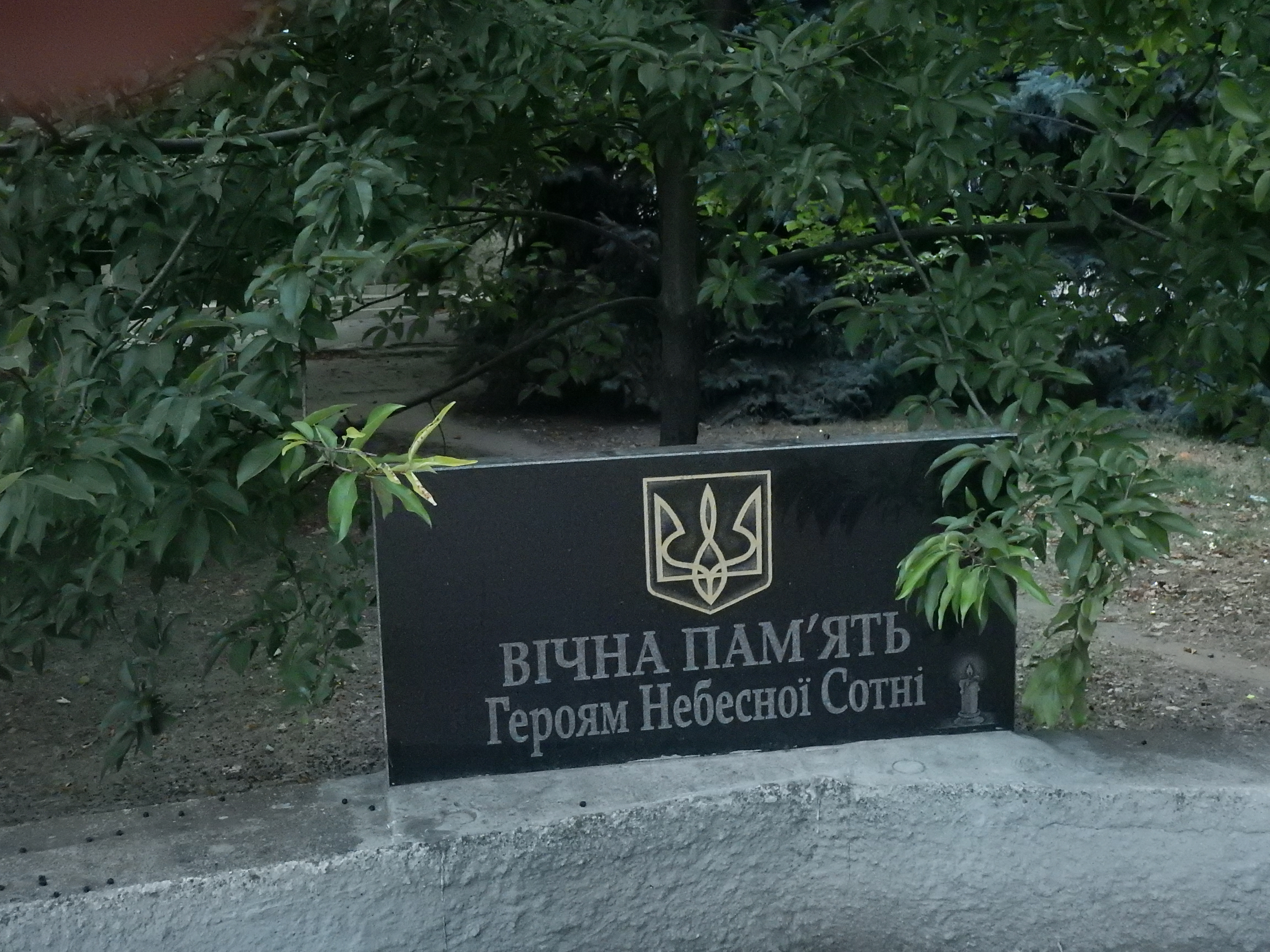
Nebesna Sotnia memorial in Velyka Mykhailivka 1

Fall of 2013, Ukraine marked the day 20 February around the world, the Day of Commemoration of the Heroes of the Heavenly Hundred. Ukrainians protested on the streets against the corrupt authoritarian regime of Viktor Yanukovych, who was the former president. This was a movement that soon became names as the Revolution of Dignity. Ukrainians in all cities and town came together to ruse up in defence of their inalienable rights. Wanting a new rule of law and democracy for the country/Demanding the government to produce them with both dignity and human rights that they all deserve.

Throughout the years, everyone from around the world is reminded of the principles and values of which the Ukrainians had to pay and continue to pay with their own lives, dignity, democracy, equality and rule of the law. The Revolution of Dignity, has become a turning point in modern Ukrainian history, recognized as an expression of the ideal of national freedom.

==== Zhinocha Sotnia (Women's Squad) ====
Between 2013 and 2014 Ukrainian women and men were able to both equally participate at Kyiv's Maidan Nezalezhnosti protesting for their rights. However, women were excluded from the more violent activities, where their contributions became largely unknowable. By 2014, Nadia Parfan organised and created a "Night of Women's Solidarity" leading a group of feminists to Maidan. Dissatisfaction grew amongst the women protest and the continued exclusion for the Maiden square grew a new phenomenon known as the "Women's Squad" (Zhinocha Sotnia), an all-women self-defense brigade. The translation is "Women's Hundred", this use of "hundred" is referred to a common grouping of soldiers into squads of hundred.

Women would protest feminist initiatives and discussions about their role in Ukraine's past and future, which explored both nationalism and military contexts. The Maidan created a place where women were able to protest and be heard in a public space. Provided Ukraine's feminists with brand new opportunities to articulate divergent and familiar outlooks on women's lives through activism, social change and national sovereignty.
