= Liquidation of Cossackdom in Right-bank Ukraine (1699) =

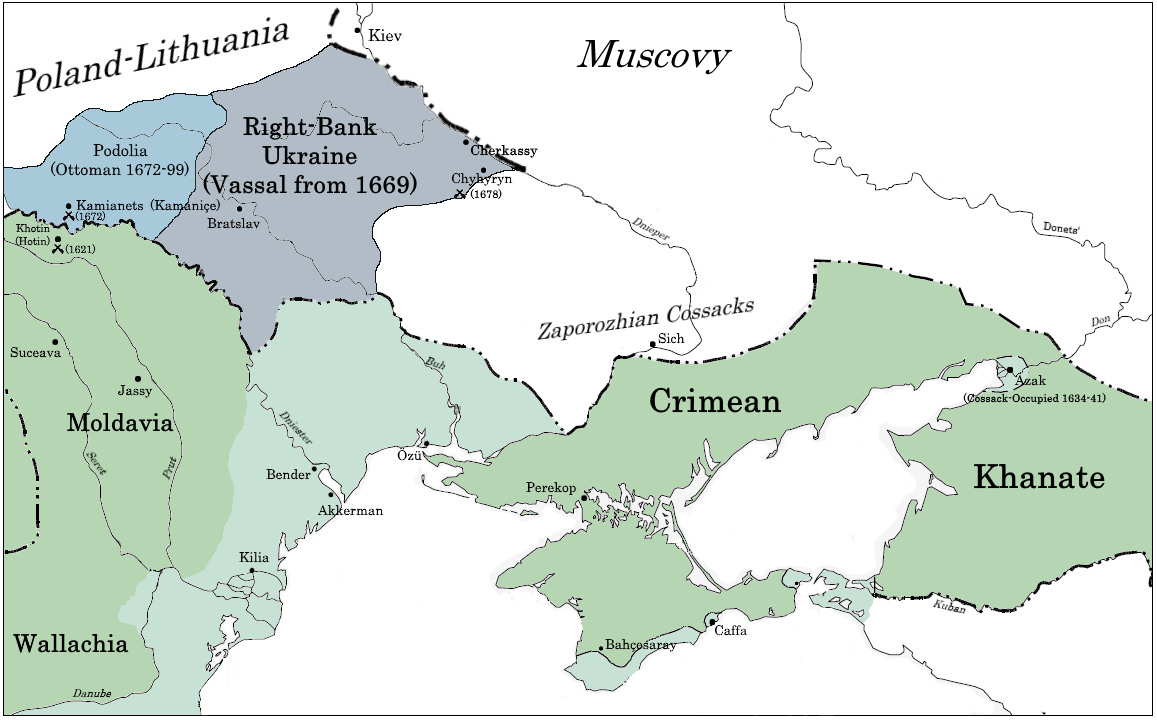
Right-bank Ukraine in the late 17th century on a map of modern Ukraine. Podolia Eyalet (Ottoman province, 1672–1699) Bratslav and south Kyiv Voivodeship (Ottoman vassals, 1669–1699) Other Ottoman vassals (Crimea, Moldavia, Wallachia) Ottoman Empire proper (including Yedisan) After Poland regained Podolia, Bratslav and south Kyiv from the Ottomans with the help of Cossack regiments by January 1699, Poland abolished the Cossack regiments in June 1699.

The liquidation of Cossackdom in Right-bank Ukraine (Note: Ukrainian: Ліквідація козацтва на Правобережній Україні, romanized: Likvidatsija kozatsva na Pravoberezhnij Ukrajini.) was a reform announced by the government of the Polish–Lithuanian Commonwealth in June 1699, and carried out in 1713, which abolished the regimental system in Right-bank Ukraine: the Podolian Voivodeship, the Bratslav Voivodeship and the southern Kyiv Voivodeship.

The decision caused the Paliy uprising (1700–1704) and the subsequent occupation of all of Western Ukraine by the Left-bank Hetman Ivan Mazepa (aided by remnants of the Right-bank Cossack rebels under Hetman Samiilo Samus), at the same time as the Swedish invasion of Poland (1701–1706) during the Great Northern War and Civil war in Poland (1704–1706). It was not until after the Northern War in Ukraine was over in 1713 and the Commonwealth was able to secure the Right Bank again that the liquidation was carried out, and the regiments were abolished definifitely.

== Background ==
=== Restoring the Right-bank Hetmanate ===
During The Ruin, the Right Bank region was depopulated, especially during the Great Expulsion of 1678–1679. As early as 1683, the Polish king John III Sobieski appointed Stefan Kunicki as Acting Hetman of Right-bank Ukraine with his official residence at Nemyriv. Kunicki spent considerable efforts on restored and resettling the Right Bank of the Dnipro throughout 1683, but Kunicki's campaign in late 1683 ended in disaster, for which the Cossack Rada convicted him for cowardice and had him executed in January 1684. In his stead, they elected Andriy Mohyla as their own new hetman, according to established Cossack custom.

=== Restoring Right-bank Cossackdom ===
King Sobieski understood he needed not just an appointed hetman, but fully functional Cossack regiments who chose and trusted their own commanders. Therefore, the king decreed later that year that the Cossack Regiments should be restored to secure and guard the Right Bank. A few months later, the Sejm of the Polish–Lithuanian Commonwealth also decided on the Restoration of Cossackdom in Right-bank Ukraine (1685) in order to revive the region's economy and defend against Ottoman attacks. Several Cossack regiments were re-established on the Right Bank: the Bila Tserkva (Fastiv), Bratslav, Vinnytsia (Kalnytsia), and Korsun Regiments.

=== Karlowitz ===
However, just 14 years later, in January 1699, the Treaty of Karlowitz was signed between the Polish–Lithuanian Commonwealth and the Ottoman Empire to end the Great Turkish War. The Polish–Lithuanian Commonwealth regained Podolia (Podillia), including Kamianets, whilst the Ottoman Empire renounced its claims to Ukraine. Attractive prospects lay ahead for the Polish-Lithuanian Commonwealth in Right-bank Ukraine. The Szlachta of the Commonwealth advanced into the Podolian Voivodeship, the Bratslav Voivodeship and the southern Kyiv Voivodeship. In Podolia, the old order of the Commonwealth was immediately restored.

Once the Ottoman threat had diminished, the authorities of the Polish–Lithuanian Commonwealth were no longer interested in maintaining the Cossack system; consequently, in June 1699, a decision was taken by the Sejm of the Commonwealth to abolish Cossackdom in Right-Bank Ukraine.

== Decisions and subsequent developments ==
In June 1699, the Sejm in Warsaw passed a resolution to disband the Cossack regiments in the Kyiv and Bratslav Voivodeships. The disbandment of the Cossack army was to take place within two weeks. This decision was justified by the idea that, following the end of the war with the Ottoman Empire, there was no longer any need to maintain Cossack regiments on the Right Bank.

Right-bank Ukraine in 1764. Podolia Voivodeship (western Podolia) Bratslav Voivodeship (eastern Podolia) South Kyiv Voivodeship

In accordance with the Sejm’s decision, on 20 August 1699 the Crown Hetman addressed the acting Hetman, Samiilo Samus, as well as the colonels Semen Paliy, Zakhar Iskra and Andrii Abazyn, with a decree demanding the disbandment of the Cossack regiments. At the same time, he announced the dispatch of Polish-Lithuanian Commonwealth troops to the Right Bank, which would compel them to submit to the Commonwealth. To this end, several dozen mounted banners of the Polish-Lithuanian Commonwealth and infantry regiments were sent. The nobility of the Polish-Lithuanian Commonwealth set out for Paliivshchyna.

Paliy and other Cossack leaders refused to comply with the Sejm’s resolution. Crown troops reinforced the garrison of the fortress town of Nemyriv and also captured the towns of Bar, Vinnytsia and Bratslav, forcing the Cossack sotnias to retreat. In Podillia, the nobility returned to their estates and introduced corvée labour. Peasants and Cossacks, as well as the urban population, were doing everything in their power to defend Right-Bank Ukraine against Polish aggression. In response to the demand that he leave Fastiv, Semen Paliy declared emphatically that he had ‘settled in a free Ukraine, and that the Commonwealth had no business in this region; he alone had the right to rule over it as a true Cossack and hetman of the Cossack people’.

In the autumn of 1699, the situation on the Right Bank became rather tense, as a 12,000-strong army of the Polish-Lithuanian Commonwealth had taken up winter quarters in the Kyiv region, in the vicinity of Bila Tserkva, Chernyakhiv (modern Obukhiv Raion), Borodianka and other towns, threatening to advance on Fastiv. Semyon Paliy assembled his regiment and brought it to a state of combat readiness. Throughout the winter, there were constant skirmishes between small detachments on both sides. Counting on a possible change in the international situation, the leaders of the Cossack regiments were gathering new forces whilst at the same time entering into negotiations with the Crown Hetman and the regimental commanders of the Polish-nobility troops, in order to buy time before taking decisive action.

The Cossacks lodged a protest, but the Sejm rejected it. The new King of the Polish-Lithuanian Commonwealth, August II the Strong (1696–1733), after a year of hesitation, ordered the Sejm to disband the Cossack regiments, have them leave the region, and transfer their lands to the nobility. The nobility advanced into the Right Bank region accompanied by military detachments.

In 1700, the Great Northern War began, in which the Polish-Lithuanian Commonwealth also took part. To ease tensions in relations with the Polish-Lithuanian Commonwealth, Semen Paliy, at the request of the Commonwealth government, sent a detachment of cavalry and infantry to take part in the war against Sweden.

Taking advantage of a slight weakening of the Fastiv Regiment, the Crown Hetman dispatched a force of 4,000 men on a campaign against Fastiv in the autumn of 1700. Cossack companies, as well as people from many towns and villages in Volhynia and the Kyiv region, gathered at Fastiv. They reinforced the fortress and prepared to defend it. A battle took place near Fastiv, in which the Polish-nobility army was defeated and forced to retreat to Volhynia. The Kyiv and Bratslav Voivodeships effectively fell into Paliy’s hands.

The victory helped to revitalise the liberation movement on the Right Bank. In April 1701, the Polish hetman F. Potocki, in a proclamation addressed to the noble regional assemblies, reported with concern that ‘the Cossack colonel Paliy is attempting to follow in the footsteps of Khmelnytsky, who lit the torch of the peasant war’.

On 25 January 1702, King August II officially and personally addressed Paliy, ordering him to implement the Sejm Constitution of 1699. Paliy energetically prepared for the ongoing struggle against the Commonwealth. He rallied all the Right-Bank Cossack forces around him, sought assistance from the Left Bank, and maintained contact with the Zaporizhian Sich, which promised him support. He united all the anti-Polish forces in Ukraine.

The further escalation of the conflict led to the outbreak of the Paliy Uprising, which lasted from 1702 to 1704. (Note: According to the materials provided by the Ministry of Education and Science for the National History Exam, the Cossack regiments on the Right Bank were disbanded in 1713.)

== See also ==
- Restoration of Cossackdom in Right-bank Ukraine (1685)
- Abolition of the Cossack system in Sloboda Ukraine (1763–1765)
- Liquidation of the autonomy of the Cossack Hetmanate (1764/1765)
- Liquidation of the Zaporizhian Sich (1775)
- Northern War in Ukraine (1700–1713)
- Paliy Uprising (1700/1702–1704)
- Treaty of Karlowitz (1699)

== Bibliography ==
- Ohloblyn, Oleksander (1993). "Palii, Semen". Encyclopedia of Ukraine. Vol. 3. Canadian Institute of Ukrainian Studies.
- Tairova-Yakovleva, Tatiana (2020). Ivan Mazepa and the Russian Empire (PDF). Montreal Kingston London Chicago: McGill-Queen's Press. p. 425. ISBN 978-0-2280-0309-0.
- Zhukovsky, Arkadii (1993). "Regimental system". Encyclopedia of Ukraine. Vol. 4. Canadian Institute of Ukrainian Studies.
