= Restoration of Cossackdom in Right-bank Ukraine (1685) =

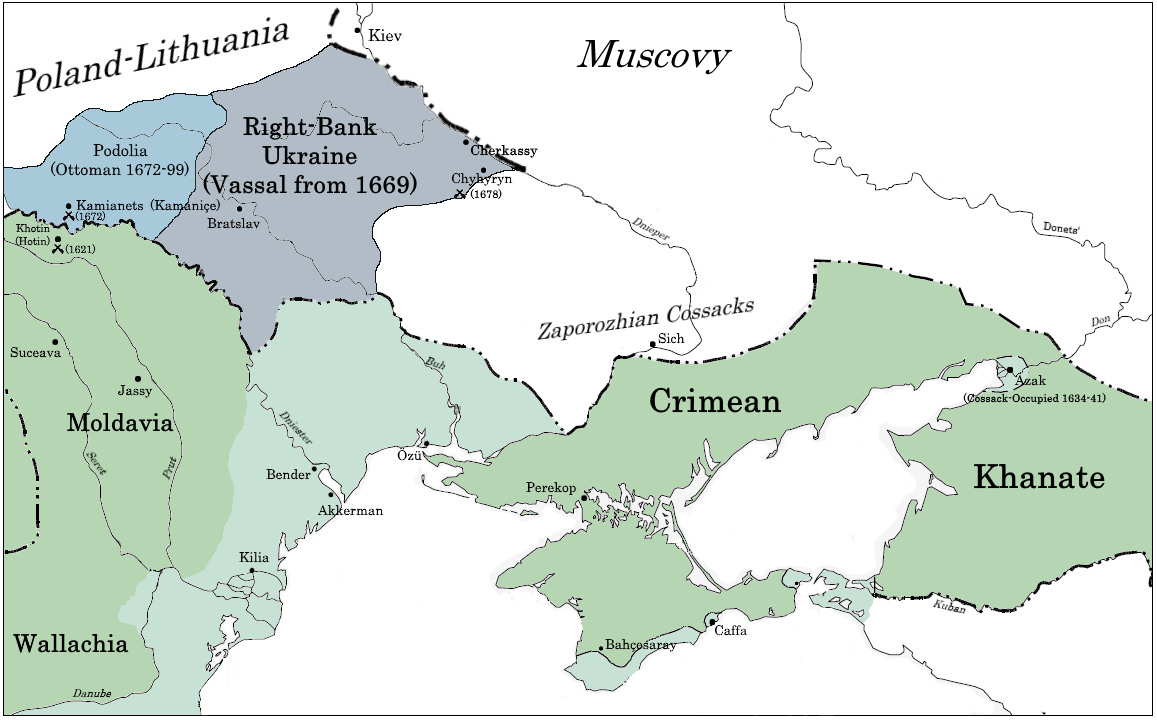
Right-bank Ukraine in the late 17th century on a map of modern Ukraine. Podolia Eyalet (Ottoman province, 1672–1699) Bratslav and south Kyiv Voivodeship (Ottoman vassals, 1669–1699) Other Ottoman vassals (Crimea, Moldavia, Wallachia) Ottoman Empire proper (including Yedisan) To regain Podolia, Bratslav and south Kyiv from the Ottomans, Poland decided to restore the Cossack regiments and resettle the depopulated region in the 1680s.

The restoration of Cossackdom in Right-bank Ukraine (Note: Ukrainian: Відновлення козацтва на Правобережній Україні, romanized: Vidnovlennija kozatsva na Pravoberezhnij Ukrajini.) was a reform carried out by the government of the Polish–Lithuanian Commonwealth in 1685, which re-established the Cossack regiments in Right-bank Ukraine.

== Background ==
During The Ruin of the 1660s and 1670s, the Right Bank region was depopulated by continuous warfare and rapidly changing political control and religious-cultural policies. In the years 1665–1676, Petro Doroshenko with Ottoman aid tried to establish an independent Ukrainian state on the Right Bank. By 1669, the Bratslav Voivodeship and the southern Kyiv Voivodeship had become Ottoman vassals. The 1672 Treaty of Buchach even turned the Podolian Voivodeship into the Podolia Eyalet, an Ottoman province. This led to a mass exodus of civilians from all three regions until the mid-1680s.

Many Cossack units under Hetman Mykhailo Khanenko remained loyal to the Commonwealth, which as a reward for their service confirmed or granted the Cossacks certain rights by the Treaty of Ostroh (1670). Incidentally, the fictional Correspondence between the Ottoman sultan and the Cossacks most probably originated during this conflict, specifically in the year 1673, as a recycling of older Polish anti-Ottoman propaganda, but now with the Chyhyryn Cossacks (in later versions changed to "Zaporizhian Cossacks") in the spotlight as a group of somewhat uncouth but courageous defenders of Christianity. Nevertheless, Doroshenko's Cossacks and the Ottomans inflicted several defeats on them, particularly in 1674. While the Treaty of Żurawno (1676) would nominally restore parts of the Bratslav and south Kyiv voivodeships to the Commonwealth, its control was tenuous. The region was especially devastated during the Chyhyryn campaigns and subsequent Great Expulsion of 1678–1679 by Muscovite and Left-Bank troops.

Meanwhile, a gradual Polonisation took place amongst the population living elsewhere in the Right-bank Hetmanate, especially the Ruthenian nobility, by measures such as 1673 ban on the Orthodox of the Commonwealth (including most Cossacks) to acquire noble status. These pressures prompted many to convert to Catholicism or join the Uniate Church and adopt the Polish language instead of Ruthenian (in 1696, the Sejm made Polish the obligatory language of jurisdiction and administration). This gradually erased the link between the Ruthenian Orthodox nobility and peasants, which had been strong during the Khmelnytsky Uprising through the Cossack regiments.

Many Right-bank Cossack Regiments disappeared over the course of the years, either due to conflict or administrative reform, as the Commonwealth was wary of autonomous regiments that could once more revolt against Warsaw, so that by the early 1680s, there were barely any left. After the death of Ostap Hohol, Right-bank Hetman from 1676 to 1679, the hetmancy was apparently left vacant as well until 1683. Thus, there was virtually no Commonwealth-aligned political administration, nor Cossack military organisation, nor a substantial Ruthenian Orthodox population in Right-bank Ukraine from the late 1670s to until 1683.

== Decisions ==
=== Restoring the Right-bank Hetmanate ===
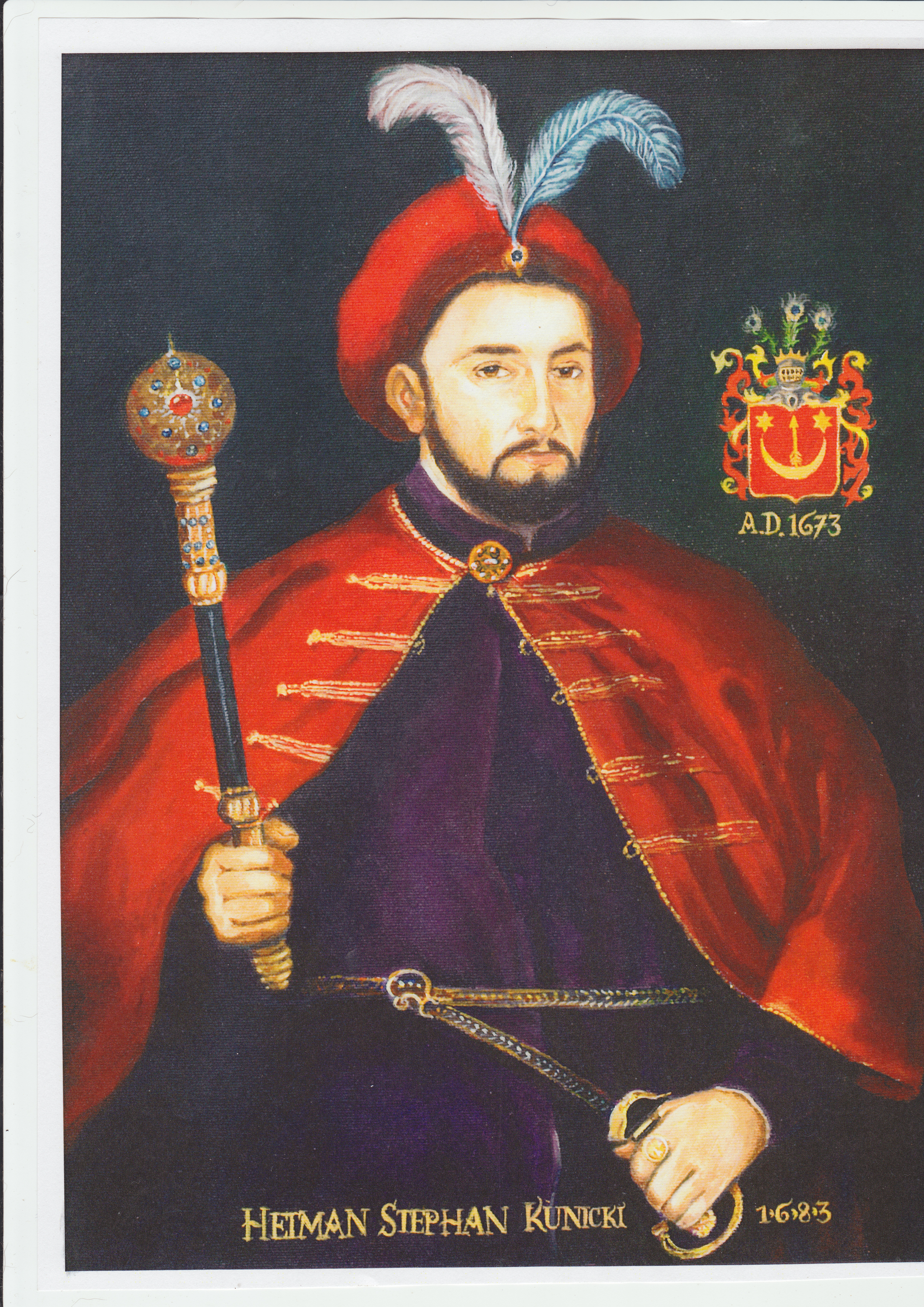
Stefan Kunicki (1683–1684)

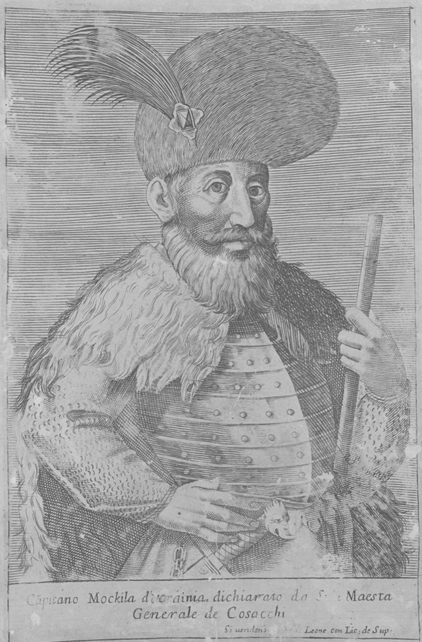
Andriy Mohyla (1684–1689)

The situation changed when the Great Turkish War broke out in July 1683, and the Ottoman Empire was making alarming advances into Central and Eastern Europe. Possibly also impressed by the important role played by the Cossack in helping to defeat the Ottoman troops in the 1683 Battle of Vienna, the Polish king John III Sobieski came to the conclusion that some Cossack presence on the Right Bank had to be restored to guard against the forces of Istanbul. That same year, Sobieski appointed Stefan Kunicki as Acting Hetman of Right-bank Ukraine with his official residence at Nemyriv.

Kunicki spent considerable efforts on restoring and resettling the Right Bank of the Dnipro throughout 1683, but Kunicki's campaign against the Ottomans on the Black Sea steppe in late 1683 ended in disaster. The Cossack Rada convicted him for cowardice and had him executed on 4 January 1684. In his stead, they elected Andriy Mohyla as their own new hetman, according to established Cossack custom. The king later approved Mohyla's election on 30 January.

=== Restoring Right-bank Cossackdom ===
King Sobieski understood he needed not just an appointed hetman from the nobility, but fully functional Cossack regiments who chose and trusted their own commanders. Therefore, the king decreed later that year that the Cossack Regiments should be restored to secure and guard the Right Bank.

In 1684, King Jan III Sobieski issued a decree permitting the Cossacks of the former Right-Bank regiments to settle around Chyhyryn, Kaniv, Korsun, Cherkasy, Uman, Kalnyk and Bila Tserkva.

This decision had several consequences — it ensured the security of the Polish–Lithuanian Commonwealth's southeastern borders, recognised the merits of the Ukrainian Cossacks in countering the Ottoman threat, and was also intended to facilitate the economic development of the Ukrainian Right Bank, which had been ravaged by prolonged wars.

The next Sejm, convened in early 1685, confirmed the legality of the royal decree by its resolution of 16 February, stipulating the following:

All rank-and-file Cossacks and Ukrainians who wish to recognise Mohyla as hetman are to settle in Ukraine; their ancestral liberties, freedoms and privileges, which were granted by our predecessors, shall be restored to them….

== Restoration process ==
=== Establishment of Cossack administration ===
Podolia and south Kyiv Voivodeship on the 1613 Radziwiłł map

Right-bank Ukraine in 1764. Podolia Voivodeship (western Podolia) Bratslav Voivodeship (eastern Podolia) South Kyiv Voivodeship

Stefan Kunicki, whom Sobieski had appointed hetman as early as 1683, devoted considerable attention to the reconstruction of life in Right-bank Ukraine. During his relatively short tenure as hetman (1683–1684), the towns of Korsun, Bohuslav and Moshny were rebuilt.

Hetman Andriy Mohyla was permitted to appoint colonels not from the nobility, as had been the case until then, but from among the Cossack officers. Immediately afterwards, several Cossack regiments were revived on the Right Bank — the Bila Tserkva (Fastiv), Bratslav, Vinnytsia (Kalnyk) and Korsun Regiment. Mohyla chose the town of Nemyriv in the Vinnytsia region as the hetman's residence. In the summer of 1687, he appointed Colonel M. Buliga as acting hetman. During Mohyla's tenure as hetman in 1686, 1687 and 1689, Cossack registers were compiled on the instructions of the Commonwealth government.

Within the regiments' territories, authority rested with the colonels, centurions and other administrative officials. The norms of customary and Cossack law prevailed locally. Cossack self-governing bodies were established in towns and villages. The Cossack administration was headed by a deputy hetman, who was appointed by the king. Between 1689 and 1693, Hryshko served as deputy hetman, and he was succeeded by Samus.

=== Settlement ===
The process of settling these lands was led by veteran Cossacks Semen Paliy, Zakhar Iskra, Samiilo Samus and Andrii Abazyn. Unlike their predecessors, who relied predominantly on military and adventurous elements, they favoured a settled, agricultural population. The promised privileges attracted residents of the Left Bank, settlers from other parts of the Right Bank and Galicia, as well as people from Belarus and Moldavia. Serhii Plokhy (2006) noted:

"The Cossack colonels appointed by the king were quite successful in attracting new colonists to the territory, which the Commonwealth had no legal right to settle. They operated in a gray zone between the Commonwealth and the Ottomans, which made them indispensable to the Polish-Lithuanian state."

The Cossacks of the new regiments (2,000 of whom were entered in the Register) took an active part in the 1683–1699 war against the Ottoman Empire, for which they received substantial sums of money from the authorities of the Commonwealth. The strengthening of the Cossacks led to an escalation of the conflict with the szlachta, which broke out in 1688. However, whilst the war with the Ottoman Empire was ongoing, the supreme authorities of the Commonwealth turned a blind eye to this.

=== Efforts of Semen Paliy ===
As early as 25 August 1685, Semen Paliy, whilst in Bila Tserkva, issued a proclamation in which he informed all those travelling through the territory of the Bila Tserkva Regiment of the introduction of a toll for the benefit of the new Cossack administration.

In that same year, 1685, Paliy first appealed to the Moscow government, via the Left-Bank Hetman, requesting to be placed under the Hetman’s rule and to become a subject of the Moscow monarch. ‘“Hunting Colonel Semen Paliy wrote to me on behalf of His Royal Majesty… asking me, the Hetman, to take him and the men he has enlisted under his command into the God-protected realm of His Tsarist Most Illustrious Majesty; I am sending Paliy’s letter…”’, reported Ivan Mazepa.

However, in view of the Polish–Russian Peace Treaty (1686) concluded between Warsaw and Moscow, the initiative put forward by the colonel from Fastiv was not supported.

== Assessment ==
However, the Sejm's resolution came somewhat too late, as by the time it was passed, regiments led by Colonels Sulima, Buluk-Bashi, Barabash, Korsunets and others were already in place on the Right Bank. They had their own independently organised authority, enjoyed Cossack liberties and had no desire whatsoever to submit to the king.

However, the legitimisation of the Cossack settlements by a royal decree and a Sejm resolution gave fresh impetus to the colonisation movements, which had previously been of a spontaneous nature. The Fastiv region, where Colonel Semen Paliy was in charge, seemed particularly attractive to displaced persons. He enjoyed great prestige amongst the Cossacks and the general populace, had patrons in the king's entourage, and people were keen to settle on his lands – not only those from the right bank of the Dnieper region, but also from Podolia, Volhynia, Polesia and even Galicia. There were also many people from the Left Bank who wished to seek refuge under Paliy's protection, which greatly troubled the Left Bank officers and Hetman Ivan Samoylovych.

As a result of the restoration of ‘Cossack liberties’ in the late 17th and early 18th centuries, the territories of Kyiv, Bratslav, Eastern Volhynia and Central Podolia were effectively independent of the authority of the Polish–Lithuanian Commonwealth.

The military and political activities of the Ukrainian hetmans and Cossack officers, and their gradual colonisation of the Right-Bank lands in the first half of the 1680s, eventually bore fruit. According to Ukrainian historians, during the second half of the 1680s and 1690s, there was a steady process of revival of the political structures of the Hetmanate.

== Subsequent events ==
In January 1699, the Treaty of Karlowitz was signed between the Polish–Lithuanian Commonwealth and the Ottoman Empire, establishing peace at the end of the Great Turkish War. The Commonwealth regained Podolia, including Kamianets, whilst the Ottoman Empire renounced its claims to Ukraine. Attractive prospects opened up for the Commonwealth in Right-Bank Ukraine. The Polish nobility moved into Podolia, the Bratslav region and southern Kyiv voivodeships. In Podolia, the old order of the Commonwealth was immediately restored.

Once the Ottoman threat had diminished, the authorities of the Commonwealth were no longer interested in maintaining the Cossack system; consequently, in 1699, a decision was taken to abolish Cossackdom in Right-bank Ukraine. This decision subsequently led to the great Paliy Uprising in 1700–1704.

== See also ==
- Liquidation of Cossackdom in Right-bank Ukraine (1699)
- Abolition of the Cossack system in Sloboda Ukraine (1763–1765)
- Liquidation of the autonomy of the Cossack Hetmanate (1764/1765)
- Liquidation of the Zaporizhian Sich (1775)
- Northern War in Ukraine (1700–1713)
- Paliy Uprising (1700/1702–1704)
- Treaty of Karlowitz (1699)

== Bibliography ==
- Chukhlib, Taras (2010). "Могила (Могиленко, Мигула) Андрій" [Mohyla (Mohylenko, Myhula) Andriy]. Encyclopedia of History of Ukraine (in Ukrainian). Vol. 7. Kyiv: Institute of History of Ukraine. pp. 11–12. Archived from the original on 5 October 2026.
- Ohloblyn, Oleksander (1993). "Palii, Semen". Encyclopedia of Ukraine. Vol. 3. Canadian Institute of Ukrainian Studies.
- Plokhy, Serhii (2006). The Origins of the Slavic Nations: Premodern Identities in Russia, Ukraine, and Belarus (PDF). New York: Cambridge University Press. pp. 10–15. ISBN 978-0-521-86403-9. Archived (PDF) from the original on 6 June 2011.
- Tairova-Yakovleva, Tatiana (2020). Ivan Mazepa and the Russian Empire (PDF). Montreal Kingston London Chicago: McGill-Queen's Press. p. 425. ISBN 978-0-2280-0309-0.
- Zhukovsky, Arkadii (1993). "Regimental system". Encyclopedia of Ukraine. Vol. 4. Canadian Institute of Ukrainian Studies.
