= Paliy uprising =

Cossack uprising against the Polish–Lithuanian Commonwealth in 1702–1704

- Part of the Swedish invasion of Poland (1701–1706) and the Northern War in Ukraine
- Leaders of the Paliy uprising. Detail of the Monument to Semen Paliy on Paliy Mountain in Bila Tserkva.
Date	(1700) 1702 – July 1704
Location	Right-Bank Ukraine, Polish–Lithuanian Commonwealth
Result	Uprising suppressed Mazepa's occupation of the Right Bank (See § Aftermath)
Territorial changes	Right-bank Ukraine transferred to the Left-bank Hetmanate

Belligerents
Right-bank Cossacks	Polish–Lithuanian Commonwealth	Left-bank Hetmanate Supported by Tsardom of Russia

Commanders and leaders
Semen Paliy (POW); Samiilo Samus; Andrii Abazyn (executed)	Adam Mikołaj Sieniawski; Józef Potocki; Marcin Chomętowski	Ivan Mazepa; Supported by Peter I

Strength
12,000 rebels	15,000	10,000 Mazepa's Cossacks

Casualties and losses
2,000–5,000 rebels executed 70,000 civilians wounded 2,000 civilians massacred in Ladyzhyn	Unknown	Unknown

Paliy uprising (also Palej uprising) was a Cossack uprising, led by colonel Semen Paliy against the Polish–Lithuanian Commonwealth in 1702–1704, with a preliminary skirmish in 1700. After the suppression of the uprising, Right-bank Ukraine was transferred to the Cossack Hetmanate being de-facto its part until 1714, when following the unsuccessful attempt of Pylyp Orlyk's March on the Right-bank Ukraine to capture Right-Bank Ukraine from the Tsardom of Russia, it was transferred back to Polish–Lithuanian Commonwealth.

== Background ==
=== 1685 Restoration of Cossackdom ===
During the The Ruin of the 1660s and 1670s, the Cossack Hetmanate gradually split along the Dnipro into a Tsardom-allied Left-bank Hetmanate and a Commonwealth-loyal Right-bank Hetmanate. Many Right-bank Cossack Regiments disappeared over the course of the years, either due to conflict or administrative reform, as the Commonwealth was wary of autonomous regiments that could once more revolt against Warsaw, so that by the early 1680s, there were barely any left. Yet, because the Ottoman Empire was making alarming advances into Central and Eastern Europe, and possibly because the Cossacks played an important role in helping to defeat them in the 1683 Battle of Vienna, king John III Sobieski decided the regimental system on the Right Bank had to be restored. In 1684, he decreed that seven regiments were to be formed out of military necessity, with an acting hetman in Nemyriv. The next year, the Sejm of the Commonwealth approved the Restoration of Cossackdom in Right-bank Ukraine (1685), and confirmed the rights and liberties of the Cossacks. The Colonel of the restored Bila Tserkva Regiment became Semen Paliy, who would play an influential role in the economic revival of the region, which was being resettled after years of war and devastation under the renewed protection of a Cossack regiment.

=== Szlachta–settler tensions and Mazepa's Right-bank policies ===
The Restoration also brought new tensions, that began brewing in the late 1680s through the 1690s between the Ukrainian peasant settlers and Cossack soldiers on the one hand, and the returning szlachta – the Polish–Lithuanian (and Ruthenian) nobility – and Catholic and Uniate churches on the other, which sought to acquire ever more landholdings in the Right-bank regions that were being resettled and resecured. Furthermore, Left-bank Hetman Ivan Mazepa began to actively interfere with church politics on the Right Bank in the 1690s, according to Tatiana Tairova-Yakovleva (2020) "under the pretext of concern for the Orthodox". While some concerns may have been genuine, Mazepa's diplomatic manoeuvering was also part of his project to include the Right Bank into the Ukrainian Hetmanate.

Paliy's radical anarchist actions against the colonial projects of the szlachta got him in trouble with the Commonwealth authorities as early as the late 1680s, at one time even being imprisoned. Uniates took over the church in Fastiv while Paliy was in prison, and as soon as he got out, he arrested and decapitated the Uniates. A Commonwealth army was sent to punish Paliy, who fled to Mazepa. The latter resisted the troublesome Paliy's relocation to the Left Bank, which the tsar kept rejecting after many requests, but Mazepa allowed him to participate in a Zaporizhian Cossack raid on Ochakiv in March 1692. Paliy's commanded several campaigns against the Crimean Khanate in Mazepa's service, lessening tensions on the Right Bank somewhat, but the two Cossack leaders had a fallout in October 1696. Thereafter, Paliy entered the service of the new Polish king Augustus II the Strong until 1699.

=== 1699 Liquidation of Cossackdom ===
In 1699, the new Polish king Augustus II signed the Treaty of Karlowitz with the Ottoman Empire, ratified by the Sejm of the Commonwealth. The treaty was supposed to secure the Ottoman–Commonwealth borders, and bring them perpetual peace. The Sejm therefore concluded that the Cossack regiments on the Right Bank were no longer necessary. Instead, the szlachta wanted to exploit the vast post-war economic opportunities by acquiring landholdings and establishing noble estates in the now-peaceful voivodeships of Podolia, Bratslav and southern Kyiv, and to enserf the Ruthenian (Ukrainian) peasants there for their own benefit. The szlachta-dominated Sejm therefore passed a highly controversial resolution in June 1669, which stipulated the liquidation of Cossackdom in Right-bank Ukraine (1699). The entire regimental system as well as the Right-bank hetmancy was to be abolished, Cossack soldiers lost their payment and had to leave the Right Bank. Hetman Samiilo Samus and the Right-bank Colonels were all ordered to dismiss their Cossacks, and to leave all private and royal possessions. Crown Hetman Stanisław Jan Jabłonowski was assigned to oversee the implementation of this order. He would also issue a universal barring the Cossacks from settling on the Right Bank.

== Rebellion ==
=== 1700–1701: initial Cossack resistance ===
Many Cossacks were angered by this situation, particularly after the restoration of the regimental system had been achieved just 14 years earlier. Colonel Paliy was one amongst many Cossacks who refused to leave their homes and regiments. In 1700, colonel Paliy of the Bila Tserkva Regiment and a few other Cossack colonels fought a skirmish at Fastiv with Polish troops sent to enforce the expulsion order. They chased away the government forces and set up Fastiv as a base of operations, where they planned a general uprising. While defying the Polish king, for various reasons, Paliy refused to enter into the Muscovite tsar's service either. The anarchist Paliy and the statist Mazepa also did not see eye to eye, making it difficult for them to work together on a common cause.

=== Church struggle ===
Meanwhile, some of the Orthodox clergy and laity in uproar when the main Orthodox cathedral in the city of Lviv was handed over to the Ruthenian Uniate Church in 1700. This happened after the bishop of Lviv, Yosyf Shumlyansky, had converted from Orthodoxy to Catholicism in 1677, and he and his clergy decided in 1700 to join the Uniate Church under Lev Zalenskyj with their entire diocese. Left-bank Hetman Mazepa expressed great concerns about the status of the Cossacks and Orthodox church on the Right Bank to tsar Peter, and threatened the szlachta to intervene if they continued violating their rights.

Mazepa scored a diplomatic victory in September 1700 when he re-established the Orthodox diocese of Pereiaslav on the Right Bank, which he had been working on since March 1695. In February 1701, the Peiaslav diocese was granted large landholdings "along both sides of the Dnipro". In Mazepa's universal of 7 April 1701, the restored Trakhtemyriv Monastery – once the main headquarters of the Registered Cossacks and official residence of their hetman – was included in the diocese of Pereiaslav, another important symbolic victory.

After Lviv and Pereiaslav, there was a struggle for the diocese of Lutsk; while Mazepa urged Patriarch Adrian of Moscow to ordain Dionysius Zhabokrytsky as an Orthodox bishop, Adrian refused in order to avoid conflict. Dionysius thus joined the Uniates with the entire diocese of Lutsk and Ostroh in 1702, leaving Volhynia without an Orthodox church jurisdiction for centuries to come, a defeat for the Mazepist and Orthodox camp.

=== 1702: open rebellion ===
In 1702, Paliy started an open rebellion against the Polish Crown, the last of the major Cossack uprisings against the Commonwealth. Together with a number of other Cossack polkovnyks, Paliy and his rebels captured Bila Tserkva, Fastiv, Nemyriv and a few other towns. Rebellious Cossacks massacred their traditional enemies — Polish szlachta, Catholic priests and Jews — in the area they controlled. In October 1702, Cossack forces led by Paliy and Right-bank hetman Samiilo Samus defeated the Polish army under Polish hetman Adam Mikołaj Sieniawski near the town of Berdychiv. Paliy restored the Cossack Regiments of Bila Tserkva, Bohuslav, Bratslav, and Korsun. The area under control of Paliy and his fellow rebels would become known as the Paliïvshchyna; it would eventually encompass the territory from Polissia to the Wild Fields.

=== Peasant flight from Left to Right ===
Meanwhile, many Ukrainian peasants from the Left Bank were fleeing to the Right Bank, either to directly join Paliy's uprising or simply to evade the socio-economically increasingly oppressive circumstances for peasants in the Left Bank. Mazepa sought to protect the peasants on the Left Bank from aristocratic and clerical encroachment (including attempts to levy heavier taxes and obligations on the peasants and further enserfing them) by upholding the established customs and issuing a universal on 28 November 1701, which forbade lords to impose on the peasants more than two days of labour for the landlord a week. Yet, even he could not fully prevent large-scale peasant flight: there were too many farmers who simply sought to escape the entire system and move to the Right Bank in hopes of a better future.

As early as May 1702, Mazepa wrote in a universal to the Vydubychi Monastery near Kyiv that there was a ban on transporting people to the Right Bank, and that people were illegally crossing over to the Right Bank and reducing the population in the towns and villages of the Left Bank. In December 1702, tsar Peter ordered Mazepa to establish "strong and frequent sentries" along the Dnipro to prevent more peasants from running off to Paliy's side; the hetman issued universals in early 1703 to that effect. However, a letter Mazepa sent to the colonel of the Pereiaslav Regiment in April 1704 about the ban of crossing over to the Right Bank suggests that the measures to stop the peasant flight had not been very effective; the hetman admitted that "an innumerable multitude" of people had already abandoned the Left Bank to begin a new life on the other shore of the Dnipro in the preceding years.

=== 1703 Podolia and Bratslav campaigns ===
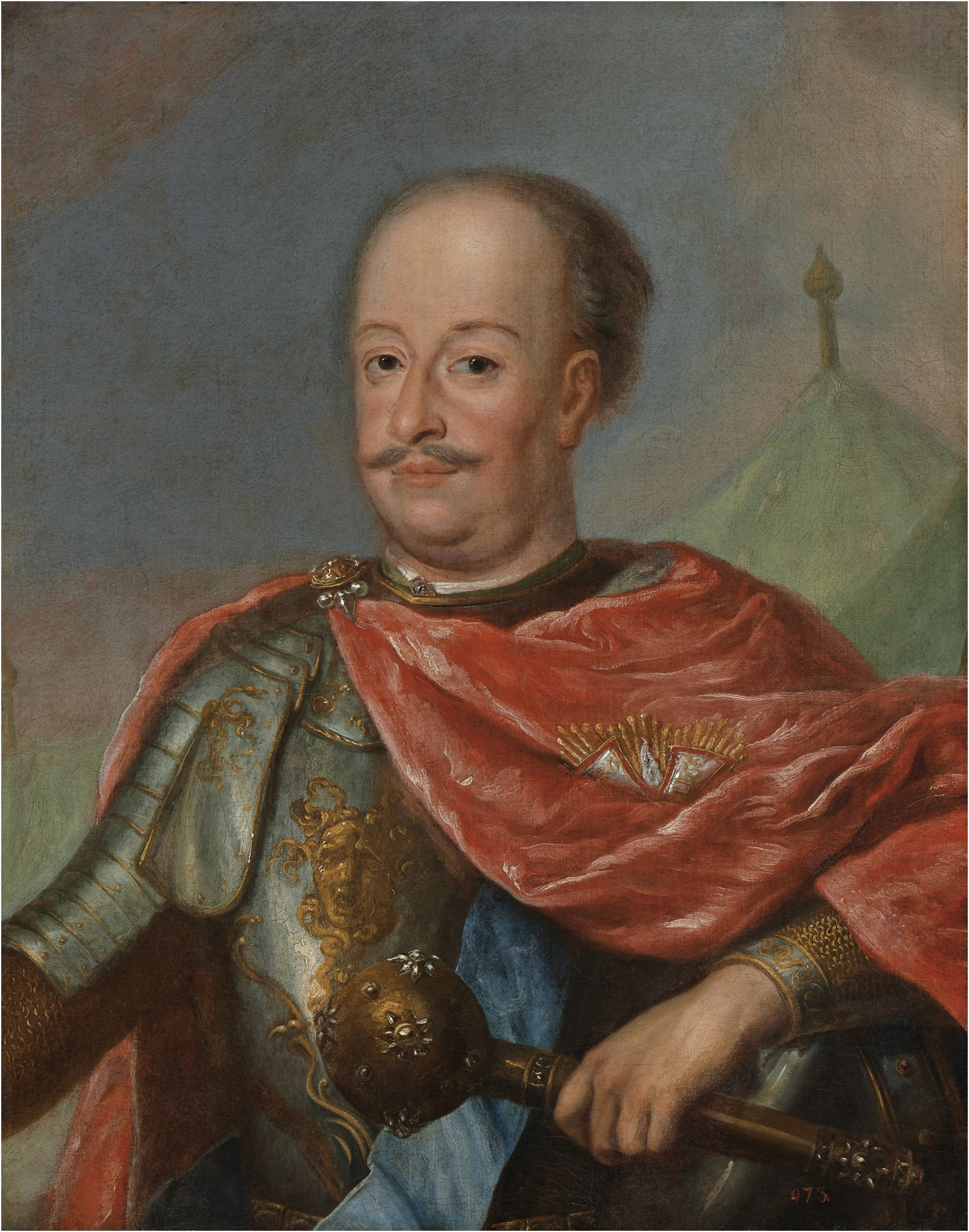
Polish hetman Adam Mikołaj Sieniawski.

On 4 February 1703 the rebels suffered a major defeat at Verbka (Werbka), east of Letychiv. Right-bank Hetman Samiilo Samus gathered the main Cossack army at Nemyriv; his 2,000~3,000 Cossacks were reinforced by the troops of Bratslav Regiment Colonel Andrii Abazyn. Together, they reportedly had 11,000 soldiers, but the real figure was probably closer to 4,000~5,000 mołojcy (young Cossack soldiers). Moreover, the Moldavian cavalry, being chased by the Poles, had fled across the Dniester instead of joining the main army at Nemyriv. On 17 or 18 February 1703, the cavalry of Kyiv voivode Józef Potocki defeated the main Cossack army at Nemyriv; the rebel army and castle garrison (taking the cannons with them) retreated to Bratslav. The Polish cavalry forced the Cossacks to abandon Bratslav as well, leaving their cannons behind. As Samus had departed to Bohuslav, the now leaderless Cossack units shattered and fell back to Ladyzhyn, where Abazyn had fortified the rebel position with about 2,000 soldiers. On 18–19 February, a Cossack baggage train escorted by about 1,000 Cossacks managed to reach Ladyzhyn, while the defenders built up their defences at the river crossings and the old fortress. Though once strong and strategically placed at the confluence of the Sob and Silnytsia into the Southern Buh, the fortress of Ladyzhyn had been severely damaged by 1703. From the morning into the night of 20 February, Potocki's cavalry attacked Ladyzhyn, reportedly getting 30 soldiers killed and many more wounded. However, the Cossack defences were breached in the late evening, 600 Cossack soldiers were slaughtered, Abazyn was taken prisoner, the inhabitants massacred, and the buildings razed. Potocki returned Nemyriv on 21 February.

After Ladyzhyn, there were three rebel groups left: one under Colonel Paliy near Vinnytsia, another under Colonel Dubina near Rashkiv, and a third under Colonel Fedir Shpak near Kamianets-Podilskyi. Lubomirski's 1,000 Polish cavalry managed to defeat Dubina's joint 2,000 Cossack-Moldavian soldiers as they attempted to cross the Dniester at Rashkiv, capturing their baggage train and many soldiers, though some managed to escape. When Shpak learned of Dubina's defeat, his group also crossed into Moldavia, while Paliy's raiding party near Vinnytsia was defeated by Polish cavalry from the Nemyriv garrison. The rebellion was thus suppressed in the voivodeships of Podolia and Bratslav, leaving only the Cossack rebel strongholds of Fastiv, Bila Tserkva, Bohuslav and Korsun in the Kyiv voivodeship.

=== Polish retreat March–April 1703 ===
In early March, the Polish forces prepared for a siege of Bila Tservka; however, Sieniawski issued a proclamation on 18 March to withdraw most Commonwealth forces to Berezhany. It is unclear why, but this move was either in connection with the negotiations of the tsar's diplomat Johann Patkul with Paliy to surrender Bila Tserkva voluntarily, or with the resumption of hostilities between Poland and Sweden. In mid-March, the Polish command declared the pacification campaign on the Right Bank over, while the two hetmans Lubomirski and Sieniawski departed via Lviv in Western Ukraine to Rzeszów, and Potocki moved his headquarters to Stanisławów (modern Ivano-Frankivsk). Except for a few garrisons, most Polish troops had thus moved out of Ukraine by late April 1703. Although the rebels had been soundly defeated in the Volhynian, Bratslav and Podolian voivodeships, the Cossack strongholds in the Kyivan region held firm, and continued to conduct raids into Podolian territory and agitate for revolt against the Commonwealth authorities. However, due to lack of numbers, the rebels were unable to conduct regular open warfare, and instead employed guerrilla tactics to weaken the Commonwealth's and especially the szlachta's hold over the Ukrainian lands.

=== Cossack resurgence mid-1703 ===
Meanwhile, Paliy and the rebel leadership appear to have begun receiving military and financial support from the tsar via the Left-bank Hetmanate of Ivan Mazepa: the Right-bank Cossack rebels were paid salaries and were reinforced by 200 Zaporizhian Cossacks. The Kyivshchyna rebels kept raiding Polish noble estates and Uniate churches, while Shpak's Cossacks continued making incursions from Moldavia across the Dniester into Podolia, raiding near Bratslav and Nemyriv in June 1703, though failing to defeat Bar's garrison. Shpak's forces began accumulating near Nemyriv in July and August, being reinforced by about 1,000 Zaporizhian Cossacks, while exchanging regular messengers with Paliy in Bila Tserkva. In mid-August 1703, Paliy's Cossacks defeated the Polish heavy cavalry near Nemyriv, though Potocki intervened and scattered the rebels from the area. In autumn, the emboldened Cossacks managed to seize control of many towns and villages in northwestern Ukraine as far as the river Sluch, often fighting the cavalry companies garrisoned in the region.

=== Early 1704: Paliy–Samus split ===
Meanwhile, however, a conflict began to brew between colonel Paliy, who wanted to conclude an alliance with Sweden, and hetman Samus, who was determined to place the Right Bank under the protection of Mazepa and the tsar. By May 1704, Paliy had once again switched his allegiance, this time to the Lubomirskis, while insulting and offending Mazepa and the tsar's representatives in a drunken incident. Samus warned Mazepa against trusting Paliy any longer, while pledging his own continued loyalty to Mazepa.

On 1 January 1704, Samus offered his mace and other kleinody to Mazepa in Nizhyn, but the latter refused: it could mean a violation of the Polish–Russian Peace Treaty (1686), and the tsar was determined to prevent war between the Commonwealth and Russia at this time. Thus, the tsar ordered Mazepa to tell Samus to keep the kleinody in "a secret place" for now. Meanwhile, the Civil war in Poland (1704–1706) brought king Augustus in conflict with the pro-Swedish anti-king Stanisław Leszczyński, making it impossible for the Poles to regain control over Right-bank Ukraine in the short term.

=== Mazepa's intervention in summer 1704 ===
Paliy's last stand was at Bila Tserkva. Once Mazepa arrived with his army in July 1704, Paliy surrendered, though he would later stoke unrest again in Podolia. Mazepa had him arrested in August 1704, effectively ending the uprising. Samus and the other Cossack rebel leaders pledged their loyalty to Mazepa. Without much of a fight in the absence of Polish forces, and with most Right-bank Cossacks joining his service, Mazepa de facto added the Right-bank Regiments to the Left-bank Cossack Hetmanate for several years, leading to a temporary reunification of Ukraine.

== Aftermath ==
=== Late 1704 and early 1705 ===
With Paliy's uprising over and Right-bank Ukraine effectively under control of Mazepa's united Left-Bank and Right-Bank Cossacks, formally in name of the tsar, the long and arduous negotiations began between the various factions about what to do with the current situation. The pro-Swedish Warsaw Confederation had managed to crown Stanisław Leszczyński the new King of Poland and Grand Duke of Lithuania on 12 July 1704, and began seeking to persuade Mazepa to join their side. Meanwhile, however, Peter I concluded the Treaty of Narva on 19 (30) August 1704 with August II of the anti-Swedish Sandomierz Confederation, which stated in Article 4:

Because His Royal Majesty [August II] and the Most Serene Commonwealth, according to the current state of affairs, have the right to invent an obstacle against their disobedient subject, Paliy; therefore, they have requested assistance from His Tsarist Majesty [Peter I] in this regard, as a friend, neighbour, and powerful ally. And so, by virtue of this alliance, His Tsarist Majesty assumes that Paliy, whether by good or evil means, will be forced to return the fortresses and places he seized in the recent Ukrainian turmoil. And he will return them to His Majesty the King, the Commonwealth, without any pretense, as soon as possible, and at the latest for next year's campaign, under the terms of Paliy's amnesty, if he voluntarily surrenders the fortresses he seized wantonly in these plans."

However, neither Peter nor Mazepa and his Cossacks had any intention of simply handing back Right-bank Ukraine to August II, who had just been dethroned as king of Poland and barely controlled his own country.. Even though they were formally allied with his Sandomierz faction against Sweden, Mazepa and Peter wrote each other letters about how to diplomatically delay the transfer of the Right Bank as long as possible, while strengthening their military and political presence there. Partially based on facts, partially as a pretext to delay the transfer, Mazepa stated that "the Poles themselves were unable to quell the riots on the Right Bank and return the subjects to obedience", adding that representatives of at least four Ukrainian towns on the Right Bank had already come to him with the request to expel the remaining Polish local administration because of their "intolerable plundering". August II and Crown Hetman Jabłonowski wrote letters to Mazepa demanding to return the fortresses of Bila Tserkva and Nemyriv, but he ignored them. On the other hand, Mazepa was happy to provide security in response to letters by August and appeals by the local Polish nobility to protect their estates against Cossack looting, which thereby de facto recognised Mazepa's control over Central Ukraine. Thereafter, Ivan Mazepa began styling himself "Hetman of both banks of the Dnipro". When he received an order on 24 August 1704 to destroy the estates of the Lubormirski and Potocki families in order to support Peter's ally August II, this provided Mazepa with a legal basis to remain in the Right Bank, and militarily act against the landholdings of the pro-Swedish Polish nobility in Ukraine.

In addition to the four Right-bank Cossack Regiments restored by Paliy in 1702, Mazepa restored three more Cossack Regiments in 1704: the Chyhyryn Regiment (abolished by the Ottomans in 1678), the Mohyliv-Podilskyi Regiment (abolished in 1676), and the Uman Regiment (abolished in 1686). Modelled on the Left-bank's fiscal administration, he also appointed stewards (ekonomy) and prefects (starosty) in the Bila Tserkva, Chyhyryn, and Bratslav Regiments, who collected taxes from leases (arenda), cauldron taxes (pokazanshchyna), tithes, and labour dues (panshchyna), which quickly provided the Reunited Hetmanate with ample government funds. Whereas Paliy's uprising had been marked by anarchy, plundering and violence, Mazepa's approach of state order and rule of law led to great stability and prosperity, and could count on the loyalty of the Polish nobility willing to recognise Mazepa's control and declare their allegiance to August II. Former Right-bank Hetman Samiilo Samus received the Bohuslav starostwo, which pro-Swedish Crown Hetman Hieronim Augustyn Lubomirski complained about in February 1705. In April 1705, Lubomirski sent Michael Stefan Radziewski to Mazepa to demand the transfer of the Right Bank, but per the instructions of Muscovite foreign minister Golovin dated 10 April 1705, Mazepa refused by pointing to wartime difficulties, arguing that the Ukrainian population would revolt again, that the Commonwealth was still in the midst of a civil war, and the king was on campaign.

=== Mazepa's Western Ukraine campaign of 1705 ===
Fearing the popularity of Paliy, Mazepa had him exiled to Siberia in 1705. In June 1705, Peter gave Mazepa a personal decree to go to Lviv with 30,000 Cossacks in order to "pressure the estates of the opponents of His Royal Majesty of Poland Augustus – the Potockis and others - ‘with large exactions [kontrybutsii] (looting, payment requirements).’" He should threaten ruin to all "who [would] dare to go to confirm the election or to the coronation of Stanisław Leszczyński." With this justification, Mazepa launched a punitive expedition in late 1705 against the landholdings of the pro-Swedish Polish magnates. Cossacks from both banks joined Mazepa, and fought side by side in the campaign to drive the szlachta out of Western Ukraine in late 1705. The city of Lviv did not resist, but welcomed Mazepa's Cossacks and voluntarily "placed itself under the hetman's protection." Further instructions from Peter were to capture the Belz Voivodeship and Chełm Land (Kholm) with 20,000~30,000 cavalry with light guns, and procuring provisions, granting permission to enter the Volhynian Voivodeship if supplies were running out, as long as Mazepa acted "decently and without plunder". The Mazepists went on to capture the Zamość Fortress with the permission of ordynat Tomasz Józef Zamoyski, where a garrison of 1000 Cossacks would remain until May 1706.

=== 1706–1708 ===
In November 1705 near Zamość, Mazepa wrote to Golovin that he was, as usual, willing to transfer the Right Bank back to the Commonwealth, but that this would lead to a number of problems, including Right-bank Ukrainians revolting, but also Poland gaining access to Crimea and Zaporizhia, and more Left-bank Ukrainians moving to the Right-bank Ukraine to avoid taxes and thereby posing risks to the economic stability of the Left Bank. At the same time, pressure from the Sandomierz Confederation was mounting to transfer at least the fortress of Bila Tserkva and some other Right-bank fortresses back to their control, and that all the Cossacks had to be expelled to the Left Bank. In a secret resolution, tsar Peter eventually conceded that he would do so, but only after the Poles had granted amnesty to the Cossack rebels. A letter from Peter to Mazepa dated 14 November 1705 instructed him to hand over the fortresses taken from Paliy to the Poles, on the condition that the latter first declared amnesty for the Right-bank Cossacks. In a letter from 1 February 1706, King August II himself told Hetman Mazepa to transfer the fortresses to his control, as Peter had written in November. The same day, he appointed commissioners to negotiate with Mazepa on how and when to transfer the territories and military equipment there back to the Crown; but because the king rejected the demand for and amnesty, and insisted the Cossacks move to the Left Bank, the Hetman refused in name of the tsar.

In the years 1706–1708, Mazepa even began to resettle towns such as Chyhyryn, Uman, Ladyzhyn, Monastyryshche, Borky, and others that had been depopulated during The Ruin (especially the Great Expulsion during the Chyhyryn campaigns). Dmitrii Golitsn, governor of Kyiv, later wrote that during Mazepa's government, about 50,000 people were settled on the Right Bank in previously deserted towns. Some Polish officials complained to Peter in February 1707 that Mazepa was settling Cossacks on territories which the Polish–Russian Peace Treaty (1686) had ordered to remain uninhabited.

In the meantime, however, Peter attempted to reform the governance of the Cossack Hetmanate and end its semi-independent status; by 1706, Mazepa and other Cossack leaders were forming opposition against these plans. Around the same time, military setbacks in the Campaign of Grodno (July 1705 – May 1706) and the Swedish invasion of Saxony (September 1706) forced August II out of the war with the Treaty of Altranstädt (October 1706), a catastrophe for Russia. By the end of 1706, Peter was desperate to preserve some alliance against the rising Swedes, and finally agreed to give Right-bank Ukraine (which Mazepa's Cossacks had been occupying after crushing the Paliy uprising without much effort) to the last of his Polish allies, hoping that he would not have to face Sweden alone. However, by this point, a rift began developing between Mazepa and Peter: the Hetman was not willing to just give Ukraine to the szlachta because Moscow said so. By early 1707, Mazepa initiated negotiations with the pro-Swedish Polish allies of Leszczyński to consider his options.

When Charles XII's army marched through Belarus in 1708, the tsarist forces used scorched earth tactics to burn down the whole countryside to delay the Swedes. As Charles altered his plans to march on Moscow and diverted to the south, Peter ordered Mazepa to do the same with Ukraine; however, after thorough consultation with the Cossack colonels, Mazepa decided to refuse the tsar's demand, and join Sweden.

== Timeline of events ==
Plaque on the Monument to Semen Paliy on Paliy Mountain in Bila Tserkva.

- 1699: The Treaty of Karlowitz abolished the Cossack regimental system in Right-bank Ukraine, and thereby effectively the Right-bank Cossack Hetmanate.
- Autumn 1700: Battle of Fastiv. Paliy's rebels established a base of operations in Fastiv.
- 1701: Unrest in Kyiv, Bratslav an Volyn voivodeships
- Early 1702: Unrest in Bratslav, Podolia and Volyn
- July 1702: Revolts in Bohuslav, Korsun and Lysianka; open rebellion started
- August 1702: Mutiny in the Pereiaslav Regiment on the Left Bank, repressed by Ivan Mazepa to prevent the Paliy uprising from spreading to the Left-bank Hetmanate, even though the rebel leaders were sympathetic to Mazepa and the Left-bank Cossacks
- October 1702: Battle of Berdychiv
- Late 1702 – c. 30 January 1703: Siege of Medzhybizh Fortress
- 1702: Siege of Bila Tserkva; captured by the Cossacks.
- January–February 1703: Podolia campaign by Field Crown Hetman Adam Mikołaj Sieniawski
  - 28–29 January 1703: Battle of Płoskirów (modern Khmelnytskyi)
  - 3 February 1703: Skirmish near Letychiv
  - 4 February 1703: Battle of Verbka (Werbka)
  - (disputed) 21 February 1703: Battle of Starokostyantyniv (by Potocki's cavalry, only reported by Jarochowski and Perdenia; dubious because Potocki was in Nemyriv on this date according to most other sources)
- February 1703: Bratslav campaign by Kyiv voivode Józef Potocki
  - 6 February 1703: Battle of Khmilnyk (Potocki's c. 2,000–3,000 cavalry versus several hundred Cossacks)
  - 9~10 February 1703: Capture of Vinnytsia
  - 17~18 February 1703: Battle of Nemyriv (main Cossack army under Hetman Samiilo Samus versus Potocki's cavalry)
  - 18 February 1703: Combat of Bratslav
  - 20 February 1703: Battle of Ladyzhyn (1,000 Cossacks under Colonel Andrii Abazyn versus Potock's cavalry)
- Mid-February 1703: the tsar's diplomat Johann Patkul negotiated with Paliy in Bila Tserkva; no agreement reached
- Mid-March 1703: Battle of Rashkiv (Lubomirski's 1,000 Polish cavalry versus Colonel Dubina's 2,000 Cossacks and Moldavians)
- Mid-August 1703: Battle of Nemyriv: Paliy's Cossacks defeat the Polish heavy cavalry.
- January 1704: Right-bank Hetman Samiilo Samus offered his mace to Mazepa in Nizhyn, but Mazepa refused to prevent war between the Commonwealth and Russia; his priority was to help Poland defeat Sweden.
- May 1704: Mazepa's capture of Bila Tserkva
- July 1704: Battle of Sonjavy?
- August 1704: Battle of Bila Tserkva?
- August 1704: Capitulation of Nemyriv, Fastiv, Korsun and Bohuslav. Left-bank Hetmanate effectively took control of Right-bank Ukraine and reunited Ukraine under Mazepa.
- 1705: Semen Paliy exiled to Sibera.
- Autumn 1705: Mazepa's Western Ukraine campaign.

== Bibliography ==
- Wagner, Marek [in Polish] (2003). "Walki polsko-kozackie na prawobrzeżnej Ukrainie w latach 1702-1704" [Polish-Cossack fighting in Right-Bank Ukraine, 1702–1704]. Studia i Materiały do Historii Wojskowości. 40: 133–160.
- Ohloblyn, Oleksander (1993). "Palii, Semen". Encyclopedia of Ukraine. Vol. 3. Canadian Institute of Ukrainian Studies.
- Tairova-Yakovleva, Tatiana (2020). Ivan Mazepa and the Russian Empire (PDF). Montreal Kingston London Chicago: McGill-Queen's Press. p. 425. ISBN 978-0-2280-0309-0.
- Zhukovsky, Arkadii (1993). "Regimental system". Encyclopedia of Ukraine. Vol. 4. Canadian Institute of Ukrainian Studies.
