= Samiilo Samus =

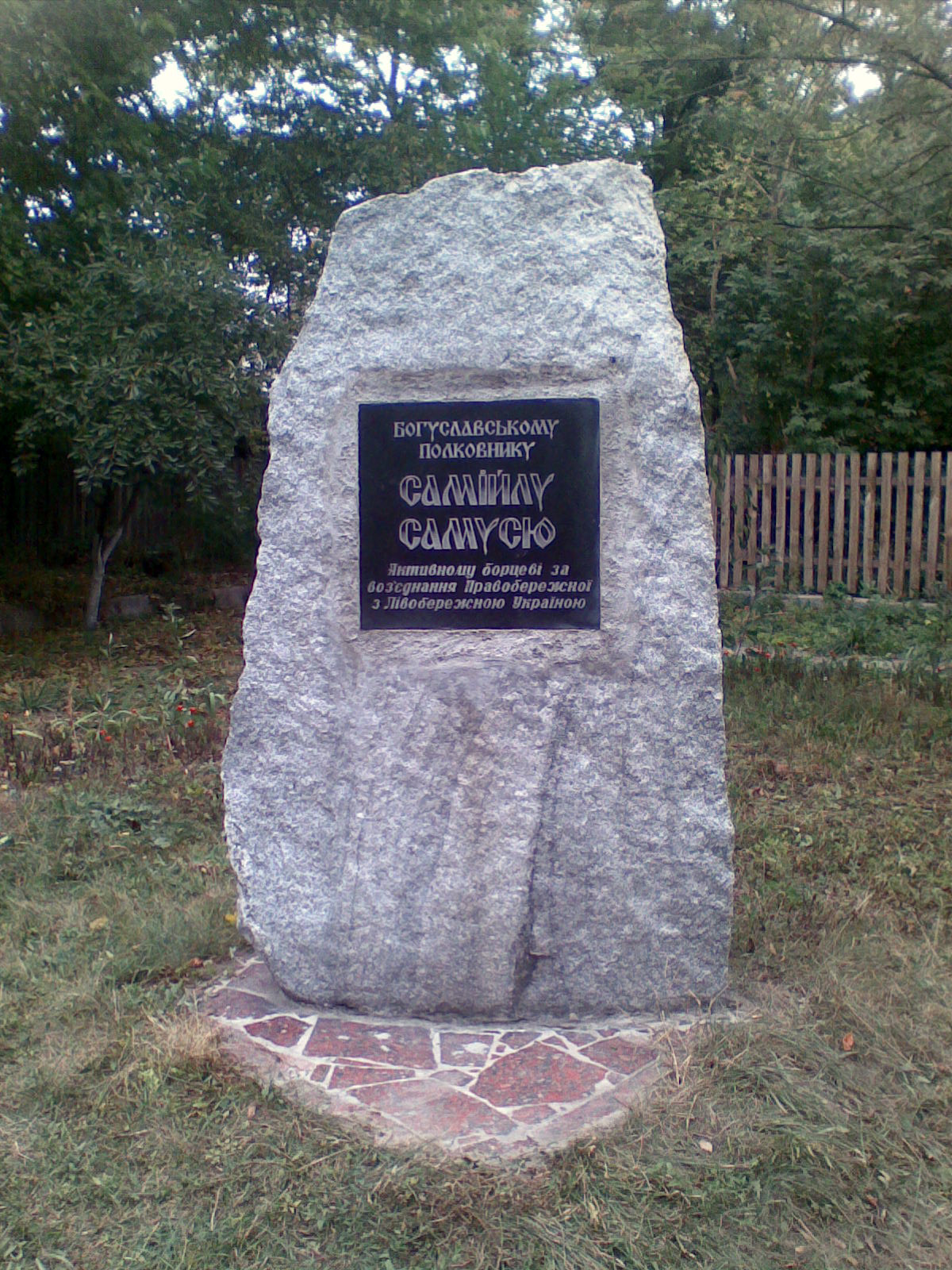
Monument to Samiilo Samus in the city of Bohuslav in Kyiv Oblast

Samiilo Ivanovych Samus (Note: Ukrainian: Самійло Іванович Самусь. Transcriptions include Samiilo Samus (compare Samiilo Velychko), Samijlo Samus', and Samiylo Samus. Polish: Samuel Samuś. Russian: Самойло Самусь, romanized: Samojlo Samus'.) (1656 – c. 1713) was a Ukrainian Cossack military figure and settler of Right-bank Ukraine in the late 17th and early 18th centuries. He served as the Colonel of Vinnytsia Regiment (1685–1699) and Bohuslav Regiment (1685–1713), as Acting Hetman of Right-bank Ukraine (1693–1704), and as a leader of the Paliy uprising (1700/1702–1704). His allies in the struggle included the colonels Semen Paliy, Zakhar Iskra, and Andrii Abazyn. Many Cossacks considered Samus and Paliy the new Khmelnytskys and heroes of Ukraine.

Samus, Paliy and their fellow Cossack rebels were very sympathetic to Left-bank Hetman Ivan Mazepa, and were offering to reunite the Cossack Hetmanate under Mazepa's leadership. In August 1702, Samus requested Mazepa for assistance against the Swedish forces. In September that year, he issued a universal announcing that he had taken an oath to Mazepa and tsar Peter I of Russia, which he would "not violate and serve faithfully until death in the service of the monarch and the hetman for all the Orthodox people of Ukraine." In November 1702, Samus' Cossacks captured Bila Tserkva after seven weeks of siege. At the same time, the uprising against the Polish nobility on the Right Bank was wildly popular on the Left Bank and amongst the Zaporizhian Cossacks, with thousands of peasants crossing over to the Right Bank and depopulating the Left Bank and the Zaporizhian Sich. Mazepa and the tsarist government were uncertain how to act: the rebellion was against the Commonwealth, an important ally in the Great Northern War against Sweden, so they could not really support the rebellion. On the other hand, doing nothing would mean the peasant flight would only get worse, and drain the productive and taxable population of the Left Bank dry. The third option, suppressing the rebellion, risked igniting a revolt against the Cossack and Russian nobility on the Left Bank as well. In January–March 1703, Polish forces suppressed the Paliy rebellion in the Podolia and Bratslav voivodeships, with Samus' main army at Nemyriv and Bratslav being defeated on 17 and 18 February, after which Samus fled to Bohuslav. However, after most Polish withdrew from Ukraine in order to defend against the Swedish invasion of Poland, the Cossack rebels regained the initiative over the course of 1703, gaining control over much of Western Ukraine. Meanwhile, however, a conflict began to brew between colonel Paliy, who wanted to conclude an alliance with Sweden, and hetman Samus, who was determined to place the Right Bank under the protection of Mazepa and the tsar. By May 1704, Paliy had once again switched his allegiance, this time to the Lubomirskis, while insulting and offending Mazepa and the tsar's representatives in a drunken incident. Samus warned Mazepa against trusting Paliy any longer, while pledging his own continued loyalty to Mazepa.

On 1 January 1704, Samus offered his mace and other kleinody to Mazepa in Nizhyn, but the latter refused: it could mean a violation of the Polish–Russian Peace Treaty (1686), and the tsar was determined to prevent war between the Commonwealth and Russia at this time. Thus, the tsar ordered Mazepa to tell Samus to keep the kleinody in "a secret place" for now. In practice, however, the Right-bank Regiments were added to the Left-bank Cossack Hetmanate for several years, leading to a temporary reunification of Ukraine. Moreover, the Civil war in Poland (1704–1706) brought king Augustus in conflict with the pro-Swedish anti-king Stanisław Leszczyński. Under the pretext of destroyed the estates of Augustus' opponents, the tsar ordered Mazepa to occupy all of Western Ukraine up to and including Lviv. In autumn 1705, in a campaign in which Samus and other former Right-bank Cossack rebels fought alongside the Left-bank Cossacks, Mazepa successfully drove the Polish gentry out of Volhynia and Galicia, styling himself "Hetman of both Banks" for the first time. The same year, Mazepa arrested Paliy and exiled him to Siberia, while Samus kept faithfully serving Mazepa. Between 1704 and 1708, Augustus' diplomats were incessantly trying to get the Mazepa's Cossack troops to clear the Right Bank and hand it back to their control, while Samus and the other Cossack colonels who had sworn their loyalty to Mazepa and Peter resisted being placed back under the authority of royal Polish authority. It was not until January 1708, when it was clear that the Swedish army intended to march on Moscow, and the pro-Augustus Poles refused to aid the tsar unless Mazepa would immediately hand over Bila Tserkva, that Peter ordered the hetman to comply.

Due to a lack of sources, it is unclear what Samus did from 1708 to 1711. He shows up again to participate in Pylyp Orlyk's March on Right-bank Ukraine in early 1711, refusing to leave Bohuslav even when it was clear the campaign was failing. In April 1711, Samus, his son and the brother of Kost Hordiienko defended Bohuslav against Muscovite troops, but they were defeated. Samus was arrested and exiled to Siberia, but later apparently allowed to return to Ukraine. In 1713, he bequeathed his mill in Bohuslav to the Mezhyhirya Monastery in Vyshhorod, north of Kyiv. That is the last written source that mentions Samus; given the donation of the mill, it is likely he died in or around 1713 and this act was part of his will and testament.

== Bibliography ==
- Ohloblyn, Oleksander (1993). "Palii, Semen". Encyclopedia of Ukraine. Vol. 3. Canadian Institute of Ukrainian Studies.
- Tairova-Yakovleva, Tatiana (2020). Ivan Mazepa and the Russian Empire (PDF). Montreal Kingston London Chicago: McGill-Queen's Press. p. 425. ISBN 978-0-2280-0309-0.
- Wagner, Marek [in Polish] (2003). "Walki polsko-kozackie na prawobrzeżnej Ukrainie w latach 1702-1704" [Polish-Cossack fighting in Right-Bank Ukraine, 1702–1704]. Studia i Materiały do Historii Wojskowości. 40: 133–160.
