= Liquidation of the autonomy of the Cossack Hetmanate =

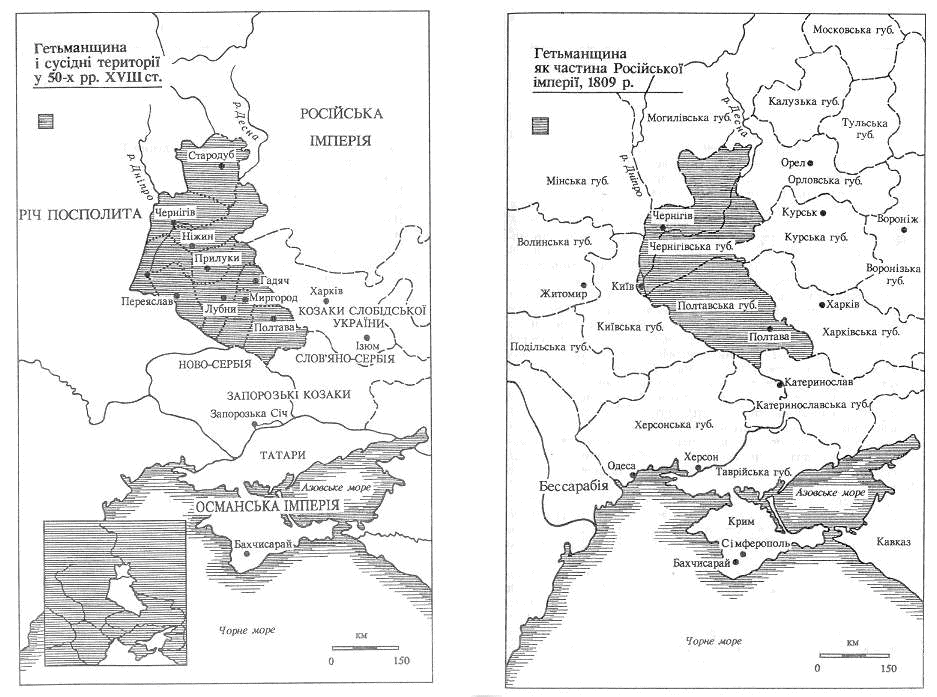
Cossack Hetmanate (1750) and the Russian provinces in its place (1809)

The liquidation of the autonomy of the Cossack Hetmanate (Ukrainian: Ліквідація автономії Гетьманщини) was an administrative reform of the government of the Russian Empire, carried out in 1764-1765 and aimed at eliminating the autonomy of the Cossack Hetmanate. During the 18th century, the Hetmanate gradually lost its political and economic autonomy. In 1764, by order of Empress Catherine II, the hetman's institute was abolished, and a year later the hetmanate was reformed into the Little Russia Governorate.

== Prerequisites ==
- 1715 — elimination of election of positions
- 1722 — Collegium of Little Russia (first)
- 1723 — Polubotok's arrest
- 1728 — Decisive points (Apostol)
- 1734 — Governing Council of the Hetman Office (Shakhovskyi)
- 1750 — restoration of the hetman's institute (Razumovskyi)
- 1754 — liquidation of the Ukrainian-Russian customs border
- 1764 — liquidation of the hetmanate, the second Collegium of Little Russia

From 1734 to 1750 the Governing Council of the Hetman Office operated in the Hetmanate. The affairs of the Hetmanate were referred to the Senate. Further attacks on the autonomous rights of the Hetmanate continued. In 1734, ancient documents of Kyiv were confiscated, and marriages between Ukrainians and Russians were encouraged. In 1744, the Codification Commission adopted the Code of Laws "The Rights of the Little Russian People," which had been in preparation since 1728. In 1735–1739, during the Russo-Turkish War, Ukrainian lands were bloodless and suffered heavy human and material losses.

During the hetmanship of K. Razumovsky, the position of the sergeant was strengthened, which gradually turned into a noble class. The role of the foreman is growing. This was the time of her political rule in the Hetmanate. Officers' congresses were often held. K. Razumovsky often visited St. Petersburg, so he was replaced by the foreman.

In 1763 in Hlukhiv the council of elders drafted a petition for the return of former liberties and the establishment of a noble parliament in the Hetmanate. K. Razumovsky addressed Catherine II with a proposal to make the post of hetman hereditary in his family. But on November 10, 1764, the hetmanship in Ukraine was abolished.

== Liquidation ==
"In 1764, the queen ordered Razumovskyi to renounce the hetmanship, and he did so. Power from the hetman passed back into the hands of the Little Russia Collegium, headed by Governor-General Rumyantsev. The queen responded to the measures of the Cossack officers to elect a new hetman with instructions that "even the name of the hetman should disappear, and not that a person should be elected to such a position."

The administration of the Hetmanate passed to the Second Little Russia Collegium, headed by Governor-General Peter Rumyantsev, who was independent of the Collegium, subordinate to the Senate and the Empress.

The Hetmanate was administered by the Office of the Governor-General of Little Russia, which headed the Little Russia Collegium, regimental and hundreds of offices, and courts of all types and levels. The main task was the final elimination of the autonomy of the Hetmanate, but gradually and carefully.

In a "Secret Instruction" to Prince Vyazemsky, when appointing him to the post of Prosecutor general of the Governing Senate, Catherine II stated: "Little Russia, Livonia and Finland are provinces governed by the privileges granted to them. provinces for foreigners and to treat them as foreign lands - it would be obvious nonsense. These provinces, as well as the Smolensk region, must be led by easy means to make them Russify and stop watching wolves in the woods."

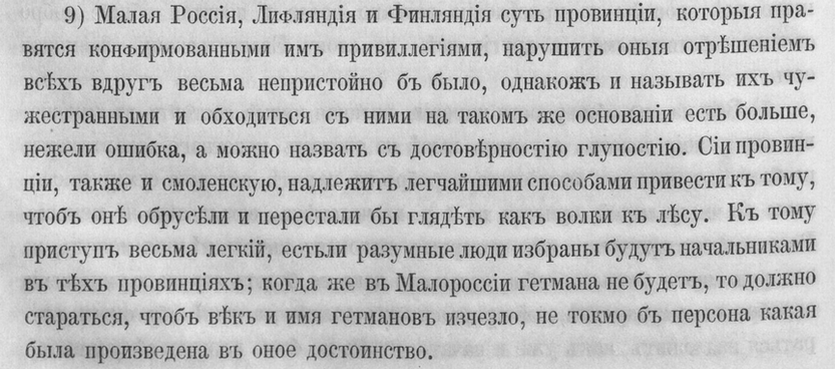

Little Russia, Livonia and Finland are the provinces, which are governed by the privileges confirmed by him, and it would be very obscene to violate them by suddenly excluding everyone; however, to call them foreign and treat them on the same basis is more than a mistake, but can be called with certainty stupidity. These provinces, as well as Smolensk, must by the easiest means be brought to the point that they become Russified and stop looking like wolves towards the forest. Moreover, the attack is very easy, if reasonable people are elected leaders in those provinces; when there is no hetman in Little Russia, then one should try to make the name of the hetmans disappear forever, not only a person who was promoted to this dignity.

The most secret instruction to Prince Alexander Vyazemsky

Сборник Императорского Русского исторического общества. Т. 7. СПб., 1871. — С. 348

== Subsequent events ==
In 1781 the regimental administrative system of the Hetmanate was abolished and governorships were formed. "In 1781, the Hetmanate was divided into three governorates (provinces): Kyiv, Chernihiv and Novhorod-Siversk, which together formed the Little Russia Governor-General."

In 1783 the Cossack army was abolished and replaced by ten carabinieri and cavalry regiments. Thus, the autonomy of the Hetmanate was essentially abolished, and on May 3, 1783, serfdom was introduced in the Hetmanate and Sloboda Ukraine.

== See also ==
- Restoration of Cossackdom in Right-bank Ukraine (1685)
- Liquidation of Cossackdom in Right-bank Ukraine (1699)
- Abolition of the Cossack system in Sloboda Ukraine (1763–1765)
- Liquidation of the Zaporizhian Sich (1775)

== Sources ==
- О. К. Струкевич. Канцелярія малоросійського генерал-губернатора // Енциклопедія історії України : у 10 т. / редкол.: В. А. Смолій (голова) та ін. ; Інститут історії України НАН України. — К. : Наукова думка, 2007. — Т. 4 : Ка — Ком. — С. 86. — 528 с. : іл. — ISBN 978-966-00-0692-8.
