= Liquidation of the Zaporozhian Sich =

1775 Russian destruction of a Cossack polity

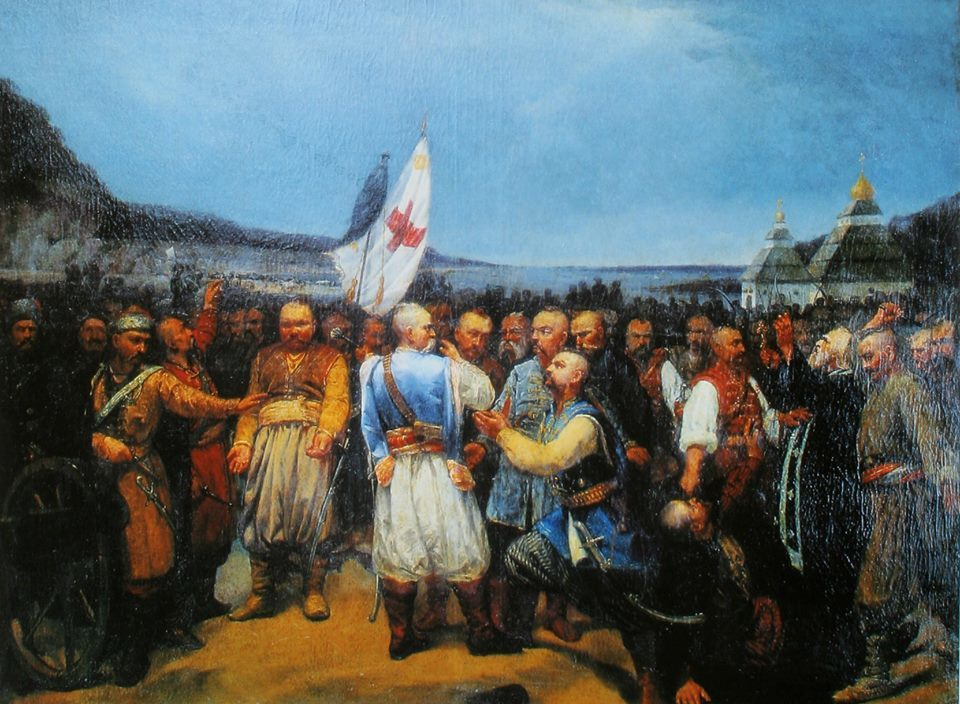
Last Rada on Sich, Viktor Kovalyov, the mid 19th century

The liquidation of the Zaporozhian Host (Sich) in 1775 was the forcible destruction by Russian troops of the Cossack formation, the Nova (Pidpilnenska) Sich, and the final liquidation of the Zaporozhian Sich as a semi-autonomous Cossack polity. As a result, the Zaporozhian Lowland Host ceased to exist.

== Prerequisites for liquidation ==
March Articles of 1654. After the palace coup of 1762, Catherine II, the wife of Emperor Peter III, ascended the imperial throne and immediately made every effort to strengthen the power of the autocracy in the vast empire. An important aspect of the Empress's policy was the so-called "Russification of the Polishized suburbs". Such plans of Catherine II did not provide for the existence of the Cossack state of the Cossack Hetmanate, or the Cossack liberties, or the Zaporozhian Sich. The term sich is a noun related to the Eastern Slavic verb sich' (сѣчь), meaning "to chop" or "cut"; it may have been associated with the usual wood sharp-spiked stockades around Cossack settlements.

When the Hetmanate was liquidated in 1764, and a year later the regimental-hundred system in Slobozhanshchyna, the last stronghold was the Zaporizhzhya Sich, which in Russian ruling circles was seen as a "hut of rebels and bandits." The Moscow authorities were just waiting for the right opportunity to liquidate the Cossack freemasonry.

== Liquidation of the Sich ==
This opportunity came in 1775, when the Russo-Turkish War (1768–1774) ended, which the Cossacks helped Moscow win, and the Cossacks became unnecessary. On April 23, 1775, the Council of the Imperial Court decided to liquidate the Sich. In early June 1775, Russian troops under the command of Russian General of Serbian descent Peter Tekeli, returning from an Ottoman campaign, set off from the Fortress of St. Elizabeth and suddenly surrounded Sich.

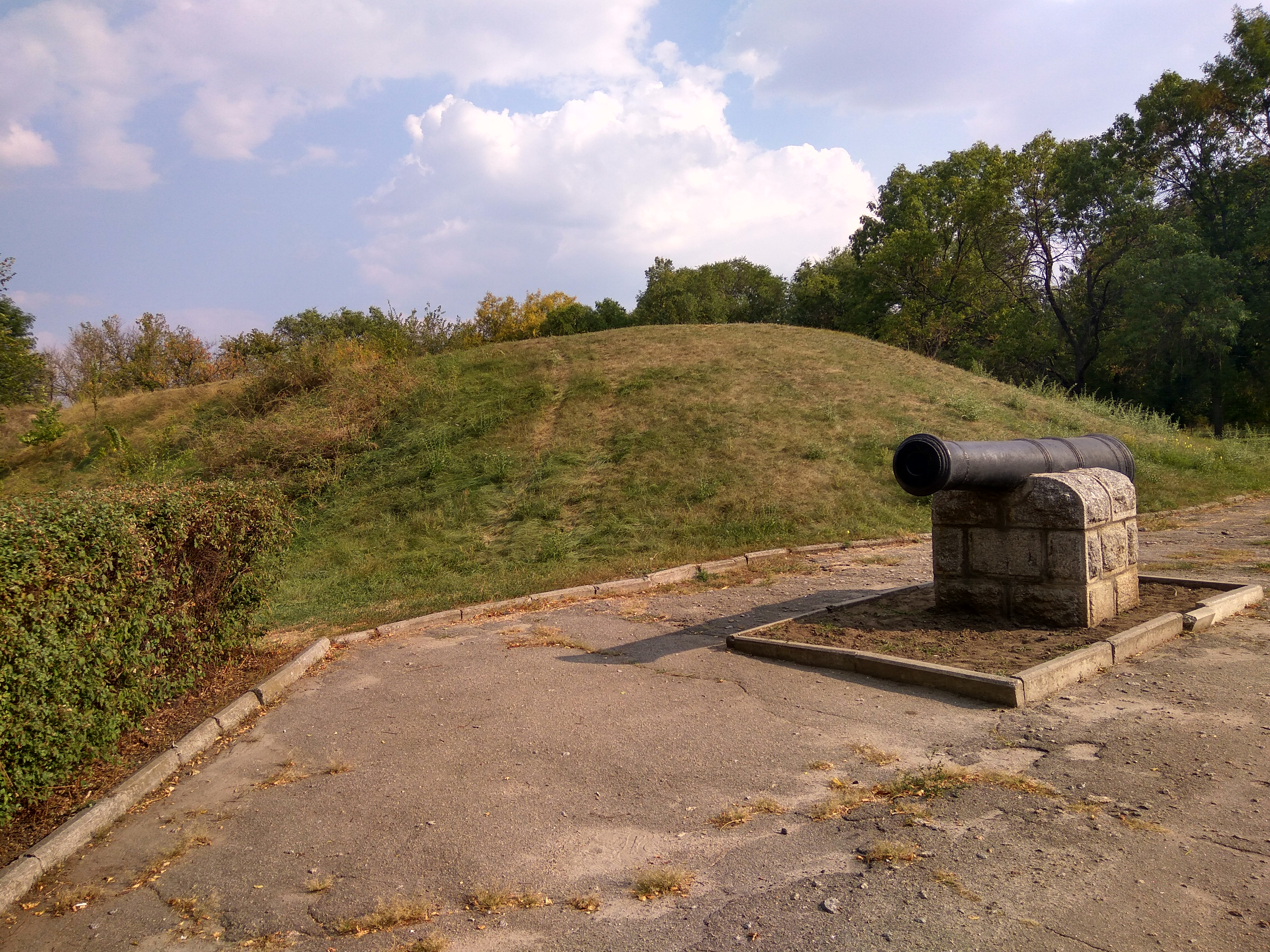
One of the St. Elizabeth fortress cannons

The Cossacks did not expect such a development, and therefore in Zaporozhzhia at that time there were very few soldiers: only a few thousand Cossacks in the Sich, while the rest went to palankas and winter quarters after the war. Instead, under the command of Peter Tekeli, there were significant forces: 10 infantry and 13 Don Cossack regiments, 8 regiments of regular cavalry, reinforced by 20 Hussars and 17 Pikiners squadrons. Peter Tekeli announced an imperial decree to eliminate the Zaporozhian Sich. The Sich society, given the very unequal forces, had no choice but to surrender to the will of the victors. It was clear that the resistance of several thousand besieged Cossacks would be in vain, while the breakthrough of other Cossack troops to the besieged Sich was almost impossible for many reasons. Among these reasons is the large number of Russian troops and the fact that almost all the Cossack officers were in the Sich, thus leaving Cossacks who were not surrounded without command.

A council headed by Kosh Ataman Petro Kalnyshevskyi convened at the Sich, and fierce debates erupted in an attempt to find a way out of the hopeless situation. The council decided not to shed Christian blood and voluntarily laid down its arms in front of the Muscovites. In addition, the Cossacks feared, in case of resistance, a bloody revenge on their families (the Sich still had old Cossacks who remembered the events of 1709, when Peter I conducted a brutal punitive expedition against Ukraine, including the infamous Baturyn massacre that became the culmination of those horrible events). Zaporozhian Cossacks took part in many campaigns of the Russian army and witnessed the brutality of Russian troops in storming enemy settlements. As the participants in the events at the Sich recalled, their kharakternyks did not want to surrender to Catherine at all, but other Cossacks said: “No, brother, we have parents and children: a Muscovite will stub them". So they decided and surrendered.

== Consequences of the liquidation of the Zaporozhian Sich ==
Shortly before the destruction of the Sich, almost the entire Cossack fleet was transferred to the Danube. The Ottoman sultan gave the Cossacks the island of St. George, with the Sulina and St. George Danube estuaries near the Danubian Sich, and issued kleinody (Ukrainian: клейноди, lit. 'jewels') – a bulawa, a bunchuk, a seal and a korogva consecrated by the Patriarch of Constantinople. Some of those Cossacks soon would form the basis of the Poltava and Kherson regiments.

The organization and rapid strengthening of the Danubian Sich aroused growing sympathy among the Ukrainian population and made it impossible for Ukrainians to take part in the war on Russia's side. Thus, the destruction of the Zaporozhian Sich and the formation of the Danubian Sich, not controlled by St. Petersburg, led to the fact that the southwestern borders of the Russian Empire were defenseless. On October 31, 1776, Grigory Potemkin reported this to Catherine II.

Attempts to keep the Cossacks from emigrating to the Danube and Southern Buh's right bank were unsuccessful. Then Catherine II on May 5, 1779, and April 27, 1780, issued manifestos asking the Cossacks to return to their native lands, promising to give each of them a land plot and service in Russian ranks. These calls also failed.

== See also ==
- Battle of the Sich (1674)
- Stand on the Sich (1679)
- Destruction of the Chortomlyk Sich (1709)
- The History of the Zaporizhian Cossacks (Myshetsky) (written in the 1740s)
- Restoration of Cossackdom in Right-bank Ukraine (1685)
- Liquidation of Cossackdom in Right-bank Ukraine (1699)
- Abolition of the Cossack system in Sloboda Ukraine (1763–1765)
- Liquidation of the autonomy of the Cossack Hetmanate (1764–1765)
- Elected Cossacks
- Dzungar genocide

== Sources ==
- Джерела про зруйнування Запорозької Січі / Зібрав та упорядкував Василь Сокіл. НАН України. Інститут народознавства. Відділ фольклористики. — Львів: Афіша, 2005. — 128 c. ISBN 966-325-054-2 , .
- Левітас Ф., Тарасенко М. Історія України. — Київ: «Казка», 2005. — С. 323–324. — ISBN 978-966-8055-18-8
- Полонська-Василенко Н. Маніфест 3 серпня року 1775 в світлі тогочас. ідей. «Зап. Істор.-філол. відділу ВУАН», 1927, кн. 12. (текст Маніфесту — С. 31.(рос.))
