= Krzysztof Grzymułtowski =

Polish voivod of Poznań Voivodship and diplomat

Krzysztof Grzymułtowski (Polish pronunciation: [ˈkʂɨʂtɔf ɡʐɨmuwˈtɔfskʲi]; 1620–1687) was a Polish voivod of Poznań Voivodship, diplomat and member of Polish sejm. His Coat of Arms was Nieczuja.

He was born to Stanisław Grzymułtowski, bailiff of Środa Śląska, and Katarzyna. In 1649 he was elected to the sejm. In 1652 he was one of the diplomats to sign a peace treaty with Sweden. In 1656 he was granted with the title of voivod of Poznań and Poznań Voivodship. He took part in the Rokosz Lubomirskiego against the king Jan II Kazimierz. He took part in the Battle of Mątwy in 1666.

In 1686 he was chosen as one of the envoys to Moscow, where he signed the Eternal Peace Treaty with Russia, sometimes referred to as Grzymułtowski's Treaty.
