= Abolition of the Cossack system in Sloboda Ukraine =

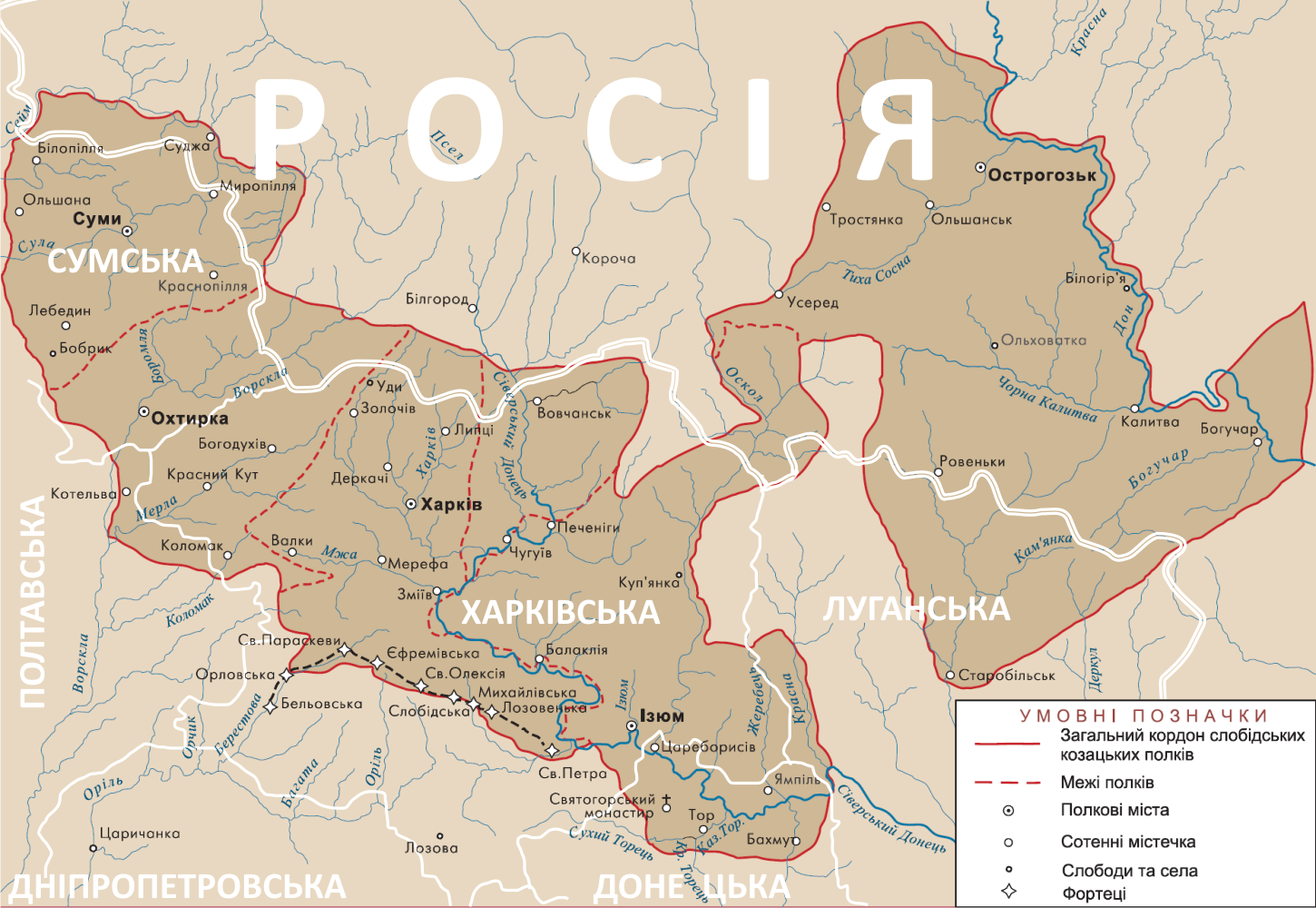
Map of the regiments of Sloboda Ukraine in 1764. Modern borders are white.

The abolition of the Cossack system in Sloboda Ukraine was an administrative and military reform of the government of the Russian Empire, carried out in 1763-1765 and aimed at eliminating the autonomy of the Sloboda Cossack regiments. As a result of the reform, Russian state institutions began to operate on the territory of Sloboda Ukraine, and the Cossack regiments were reformed into Hussar regiments. The Kharkov Governorate with its center in Kharkiv was formed on the territory of the Sloboda regiments.

== Prerequisites ==
From the time of Peter I, the Moscovite government began to interfere more and more in the internal life of the Sloboda regiments and limit their autonomy. In 1700, Peter I deprived the regiments of the right to elect their own colonels, ruling that they were elected until death. By the same order, Peter I significantly reduced the number of elected Cossacks to about 3,500, including 1,200 in the Sumy Regiment, 820 in the Okhtyrka Regiment, 850 in the Kharkiv Regiment, 250 in the Izium Regiment, and 350 in the Ostroh Regiment. All other Sloboda Cossacks were transferred to assistants, who were obliged to plow the land, supply equipment, horses and weapons for the elected Cossacks. The Russian leadership began to appoint the right people to the positions of colonels, including foreigners.

During the reign of Catherine I, the Sloboda regiments were transferred to the department of the Military Collegium, resulting in the creation of a regular company in each regiment.

In 1732, during the reign of Anna Ioannovna, the autonomy of Slobidska Ukraine was abolished. Sloboda regiments were transformed into army regiments and subordinated to a special commission. All questions of the regiments' activities were decided by a commission, and colonels were invited only in some cases. "Serf offices" were also established to record land documents, and the right of Cossacks to occupy vacant lands was abolished. The colonels were transformed into prime ministers, and a divisional general was appointed at their head.

In 1743, Elizabeth Petrovna abolished the previous changes and restored the previous Cossack self-government. She also issued a charter for all Sloboda regiments. After the partial abolition of the innovations of 1743, the contradictions in the Sloboda regiments became apparent and became especially acute in the late 1750s. However, the delegation never received an audience with Elizabeth and or later with Peter III. However, two projects by local officers attempted to reform the Sloboda regiments in the 1750s. One of these projects was proposed by Colonel Mykhailo Myloradovych of Izium, and the other by Colonel Stepan Tevyashov of Ostroh.

After the accession to the throne of Catherine II, her reforms for all Ukrainian Cossacks began with Sloboda. First, the imperial government planned to reorganize the Cossack regiments into regular military units.

In 1763, at the beginning of the new reign, Catherine II instructed Major of the Life Guards of the Izmailov Regiment Evdokim Shcherbinin to head the "Commission on Sloboda Regiments" to study the causes of "trouble" in these lands to eliminate them.

Long before the liquidation of the Sloboda regiments, the Cossack sergeant was integrated into the political body of Imperial Russia. The vast majority of them belonged (or belonged) to the "highest class of the population" ("nobility" and "common lords" and "noble families") from the earliest waves of immigrants from the first colonial efforts of Colonel Ivan Dzyk (Dzykovsky). The vast expanse of sparsely populated steppes of the former Wild Steppe with land tenure, imperial resettlement permits and assistance in settling the southern borders of Russia led to the fact that over time "Sloboda colonels and elders forgot about their homeland," "became completely indifferent to the people's interests." and cared only to "gain... their own benefits from their real position." All this took place against the background of the lack of clear legal regulation of small landholdings, even on the eve of the reforms of the regimental-hundreds system in 1765.

=== Shcherbinin Commission ===
Shcherbinin's commission was aimed at streamlining the fiscal system, investigating land cases, finding out the causes of the plight of the people. Most importantly, the guards of Second Major Yevdokim Shcherbinin were allowed at their discretion to accept complaints and investigate cases of abuse of officers in all Sloboda regiments "and as soon as Sloboda regiments commanders and sergeants those who, in seniority, follow from the real employees." Thus, the Shcherbinin Commission was given practical rights to manage the region, eliminate and appoint officers.

The Commission arrived in Kharkiv on the highest orders from the capital. In particular, it investigated numerous complaints from the population about the abuse of the regimental officers of the Sloboda regiments (because the territory was "semi-free", colonels and centurions really allowed themselves a lot). The facts of seizure of public and regimental lands, significant embezzlement (public money), misappropriation of public money, sale of military and elected positions for money, misconduct, extortion, physical violence and other facts were revealed.

According to the report of the commission, Catherine II was convinced that there was no civil authority in Slobozhanshchina, and decided to introduce civil administration by creating a governorate (while maintaining the existing structure of the territory). Also, as a result of successful Russo-Turkish wars, the border moved significantly south of Slobozhanshchina, a new defense against the Tatars - Slavo-Serbia with its regiments, and the military importance of Slobozhanshchina as a barrier to Tatar raids decreased. That is why civil administration was also introduced in the newly created province.

The result was the manifesto of Catherine II of July 28, 1765 "On the establishment of a decent civil system in the Sloboda regiments and the stay of the provincial and provincial chancellery", according to which the Kharkov Governorate was founded with five provinces in place of regiments and administrative center in Kharkov. Evdokim Shcherbinin became the governor of the new province. According to the same manifesto, a decision was made to transform the Sloboda regiments into regular hussars.

== Reform of military regiments ==
During 1763–1764, instead of the abolished Cossack regiments, imperial regular hussar regiments were formed: the Kharkiv, Sumy, Okhtyrka, Izyum, and Ostrogozhsky hussar regiments. Sloboda Cossacks and assistants were transformed into so-called military citizens (social status they were similar to state peasants), Cossack officers were compared to the Russian nobility (depending on the rank was given hereditary or personal nobility). Those who wished to continue their service in the imperial regiments were given military ranks in accordance with the government they held in the Cossack regiments. Officers who refused to continue their service also received appropriate ranks, military or civilian, according to the Table of Ranks.

Military citizens and burghers (except for proprietors and those who evaded service) by and large served in the territorial hussar regiments of the permanent staff. The regimental composition in peacetime was small – 1,000 men per regiment, but often it exceeded, sometimes significantly. Other conscripts who did not pass the lottery were periodically trained. At the beginning of the war, the regiments expanded to wartime staff, and in its continuation, if necessary, received reinforcements from the peaceful province from those who had undergone training in the past as part of marching squadrons.

The reformation, on the example of the Okhtyrka Regiment, took place as follows: «At the time of receipt of the Highest Decree, the Akhtyrsky Cossack regiment consisted of: 9 regimental and 25 centenary foremen, 59 ensigns, 26 regimental servants and 1227 Cossacks. The instruction required that people of at least 2 arshins and 6 inches of height enter the hussars; and since the Akhtyr Cossacks in the majority were people, although with highly developed muscles, but undersized and squat, most of them turned out to be unsuitable for the hussar system. Only heroes were chosen, who, with physical strength, also differed in significant growth. There were only 378 such people, of which 341 were enrolled in the front, 7 were converted to trumpeters, 5, who turned out to be literate, into clerks, and 25 people into non-combatants. In addition to them, 22 more "ensign", i.e., foremen's children, were accepted, who voluntarily expressed a desire to enter the hussars and were intended to fill the positions of sergeant-majors, non-commissioned officers and corporals in squadrons. All the other Cossacks, as unsuitable for regular service, were released home and have since become simple, peaceful plowmen.» As it turned out, the newly made hussars were much more fortunate than those of the Cossacks, who became "mere peaceful plowmen" – the latter, in the vast majority, were soon simply enslaved.

During the transformation of the Cossack regiments into Hussars, local officers were equated in rights with the Russian nobility. At that time, among the privileged class, it was the "Ukrainian nobles" in the territory of the former Sumy, Okhtyrka, Kharkiv and Izium Sloboda Cossack regiments that dominated (and owned most of the land), in contrast to Ostrogozhchyna (meaning Ostrogozhchyna within the Bulavin Rebellion, without, where the majority was for the Russians. This fixation of landowners on a national basis is understandable, because it depended on the geographical proximity of Ostrogozhsk to the central provinces of Russia.

== Abolition of the Cossack system ==
The Manifesto of 1765 abolished the Cossack system and the Sloboda regiments and introduced Russian institutions.

Prior to the reform, the regiments were kept "on the ground" by the population. Those who served in the regiments until 1765 often used their money to buy horses and uniforms (except weapons). From 1765 the regiment was held by the government, not the local population. Also, instead of the constant extortion of sergeants from local residents – horses, ammunition, weapons, fodder, provisions, salaries for Cossacks and sergeants, seizure of local horses and oxen for transportation, etc. – a single tax "from the soul" living in Slobozhanshchina was introduced. 4 graduations and entered the treasury. The largest tax was on privileged state military citizens (so changed the Cossacks and their assistants), who had the right to drive and sell in the permitted settlements "wine" – 90-95 kopecks a year. Of the unprivileged military, who had no right to drive wine – 80-85 kopecks a year from the heart. From gypsies and foreigners – 70 kopecks. From "proprietary subjects of Cherkasy" – 60 kopecks. Nobles, clergy, and women did not pay taxes.

Privileges (not all) given to Peter I by the people of Slobozian were preserved. The most important thing was that distilling was allowed in military settlements, settlements, towns, and cities (except for a few). Also, about two-thirds of the province's population was allowed to extract the salt they used to go to Thor. The "unprivileged" were forced to buy government wine from the "privileged", as well as government salt, which had a state monopoly. Also privileged were allowed other trades (manufacture for sale of various things, sale of products, etc.) without paying taxes.

Зберігалися пільги (не всі), даровані слобожанам Петром І. Найголовніше — у військових поселеннях, слободах, містечках, містах (крім кількох) дозволялося винокуріння. Також приблизно двом третинам населення губернії був дозволений видобуток солі, за якою їздили на Тор. «Непривілейовані» змушені були купляти казенне вино у «привілейованих», а також казенну сіль, на яку була державна монополія. Також привілейованим дозволялися інші промисли (виготовлення на продаж різних речей, продаж продуктів і пр.) без сплати податків.

Regimental and hundreds of forms of civil government were formally abolished. But in fact the colonels and centurions had power in their territories not only military, it was finally abolished in 1780 with the reorganization of the provinces and commissions in the county.

The territories of the regimental hundreds were united in commissariats, while preserving the hundreds themselves. In the centers of the commissariat were organized: commissioner's office, commissioner's office, local court. The commissariats were united in the provinces, which territorially corresponded to the regiments. All provinces constituted the province.

In 1766 the existing administrative division was abolished and the entire territory of the Sloboda Cossacks was transformed into a new Kharkov Governorate with its center in Kharkiv. Five settlements: Okhtyrka, Kharkiv, Izium, etc. received the status of cities. Particular attention was paid to Kharkiv, which in 1780 became the capital of the newly created Kharkov Governorate.

== Cossack protests ==
Upon learning of this, Colonel of the Izium Regiment Fedor Krasnokutsky in 1764 tried to raise the Sloboda sergeant to a mass protest against the intentions of the Russian authorities. The Izyum Regiment and some officers of the Kharkiv Regiment were clearly opposed to the reform. But another Cossack officer did not respond to his proposal – to submit a collective petition to the Empress. Each of the officers was afraid of losing the acquired wealth, positions and hoped to find a warm place in the new structures.

The Russian government has made arrests in search of a wider conspiracy. Krasnokutsky was deprived of his ranks and estate and exiled to Kazan. Some of the ordinary officers were beaten with whips. Expressions of discontent and protest also took place during the elections to the Commission for the Drafting of the New Code of 1767: some orders (particularly in the Sumy region) called for the restoration of the Cossacks. But Russian government repression has eliminated this resistance movement.

According to General Shcherbinin, the inhabitants of Slobozhanshchyna were hostile to the reform of the regiments. The Cossacks who converted to the Hussars were persecuted not only by local officials, but also by their own parents. In this regard, these Cossacks began to run away from service, they were caught, beaten with whips and returned to the regiments.

== Aftermath ==
Cossack autonomy and the regimental system were finally abolished. Sloboda Ukraine became an ordinary province of the Russian Empire, Sloboda Ukraine Governorate, with its center in Kharkiv.

== See also ==
- Restoration of Cossackdom in Right-bank Ukraine (1685)
- Liquidation of Cossackdom in Right-bank Ukraine (1699)
- Liquidation of the autonomy of the Cossack Hetmanate (1764–1765)
- Liquidation of the Zaporizhian Sich (1775)
- Sack of Baturyn (1708)
