= Podolia Eyalet =

Administrative division of the Ottoman Empire from 1672 to 1699

Eyalet-i Kamaniçe
- Eyalet of the Ottoman Empire
- 1672–1699
- The Podolia Eyalet in 1683
- Capital: Kamianets-Podilskyi
- Area
  - Coordinates: 48°41′N 26°35′E
- History
  - Siege of Kamenets: 1672
  - Treaty of Karlowitz: 1699
Preceded by	Succeeded by
Podolia Voivodeship	Podolia Voivodeship
- Today part of: Ukraine

Podolia Eyalet (Ottoman Turkish: ایالتِ كامانىچه, romanized: Eyalet-i Kamaniçe) was an eyalet of the Ottoman Empire. Its capital was Kamianets-Podilskyi (Ukrainian: Кам’янець-Подільський; Polish: Kamieniec Podolski; Ottoman Turkish: كامانىچه, romanized: Kamaniçe).

== History ==
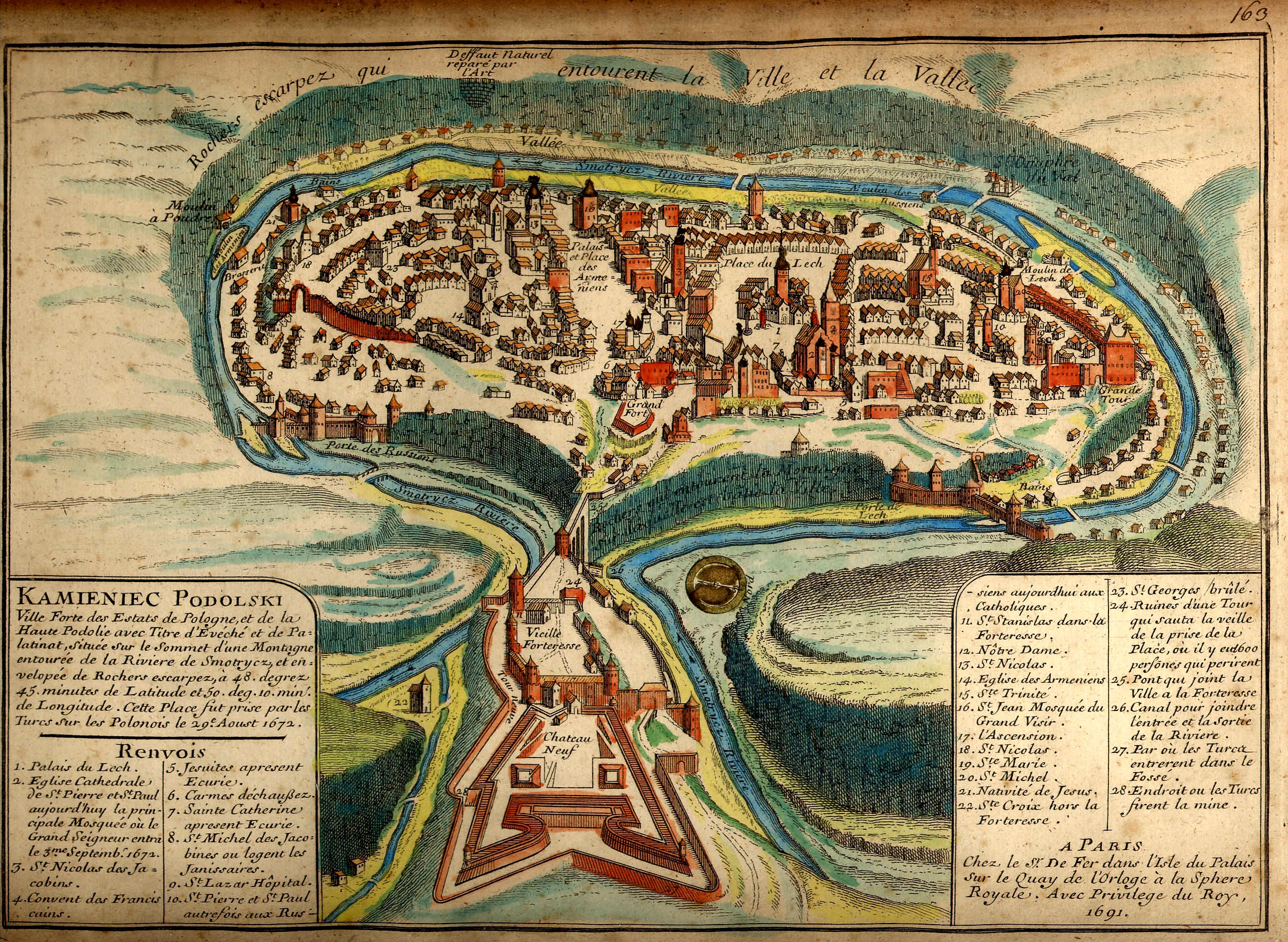
The Ottoman garrison in the city of Kamaniçe, capitol of the Podolia Eyalet

In 1672, the Ottoman army, led by Sultan Mehmed IV, captured Kamaniçe after a short siege. The Treaty of Buchach confirmed Ottoman control of the city, which became the centre of a new eyalet. The treaty was repudiated by the Sejm of the Polish–Lithuanian Commonwealth, and war broke out anew.

The Polish campaign proved unsuccessful, and the truce of Żurawno (1676) left Podolia within Ottoman borders. Another Polish-Ottoman war broke out again in 1683. For the next 16 years, Ottoman rule in Podolia generally was limited to the blockaded fortress of Kamianets, held by a garrison of 6,000 soldiers. The other garrisons in Podolia, in Bar, Medzhybizh, Jazlivec, and Chortkiv, barely exceeded 100 soldiers each.

According to the Ottoman provincial budget of 1681, 13 million akçe were spent yearly in the eyalet, primarily for soldiers' pay. Of this amount, less than 3% was collected from Podolia itself, the rest was sent from the central treasury. In 1681, the patriarch of Constantinople appointed the Orthodox metropolitan of Kamianets, named Pankratij.

The fortress was returned to Poland–Lithuania as a result of the Treaty of Karlowitz (1699).

== Governors ==
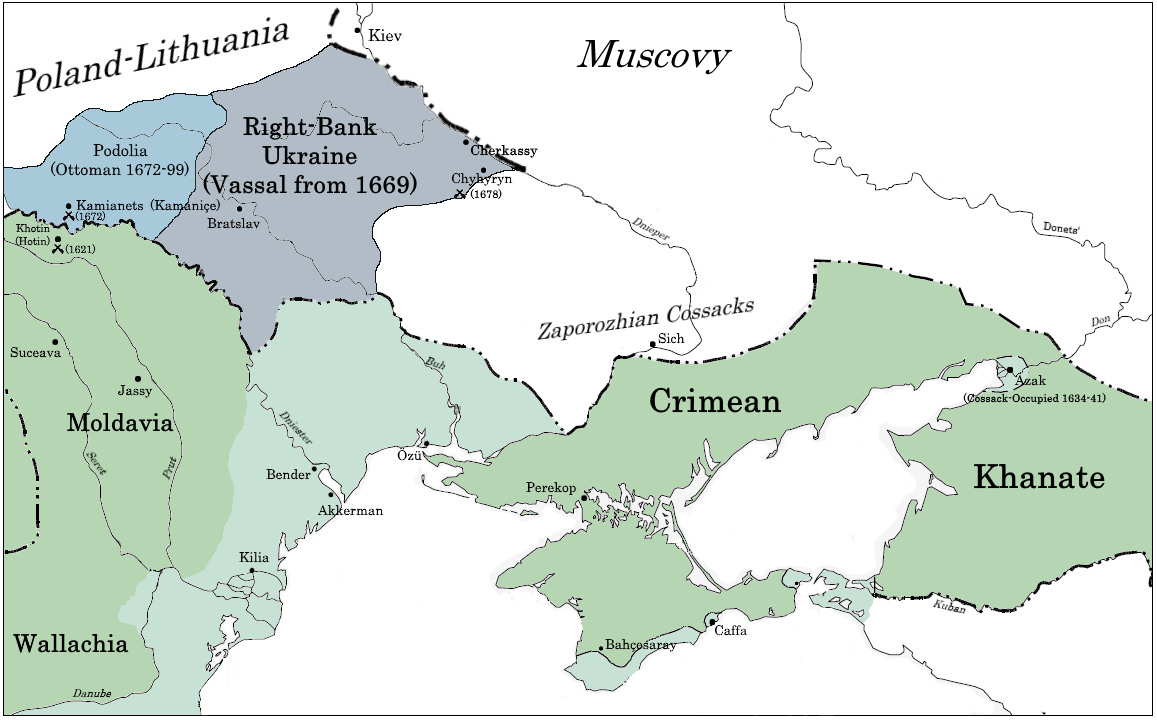
Ottoman territory north of the Black Sea in the seventeenth century

During the 27 years of Ottoman rule, Podolia was administered by nine Ottoman pashas:

- Küstendilli Halil (1672–76; 1677–80),
- Arnavut Ibrahim (1676–77)
- Defterdar Ahmed (1680–82)
- Arnavut Abdurrahman (1682–84)
- Tokatlı Mahmud (1684)
- Bozoklu Mustafa (1685–86)
- Sarı Boşnak Hüseyin (1686–88)
- Yegen Ahmed (1688–89)
- Kahraman Mustafa (1689–99)

== See also ==
- Podolia

== Administrative divisions ==
The eyalet was divided into four sanjaks:

1. Sanjak of Kamaniçe
2. Sanjak of Bar
3. Sanjak of Mejibuji
4. Sanjak of Yazlofça
