= Polish–Russian Peace Treaty (1686) =

Non-aggression pact and territorial settlement between Russia and Poland-Lithuania

Treaty of Perpetual Peace Grzymułtowski Peace
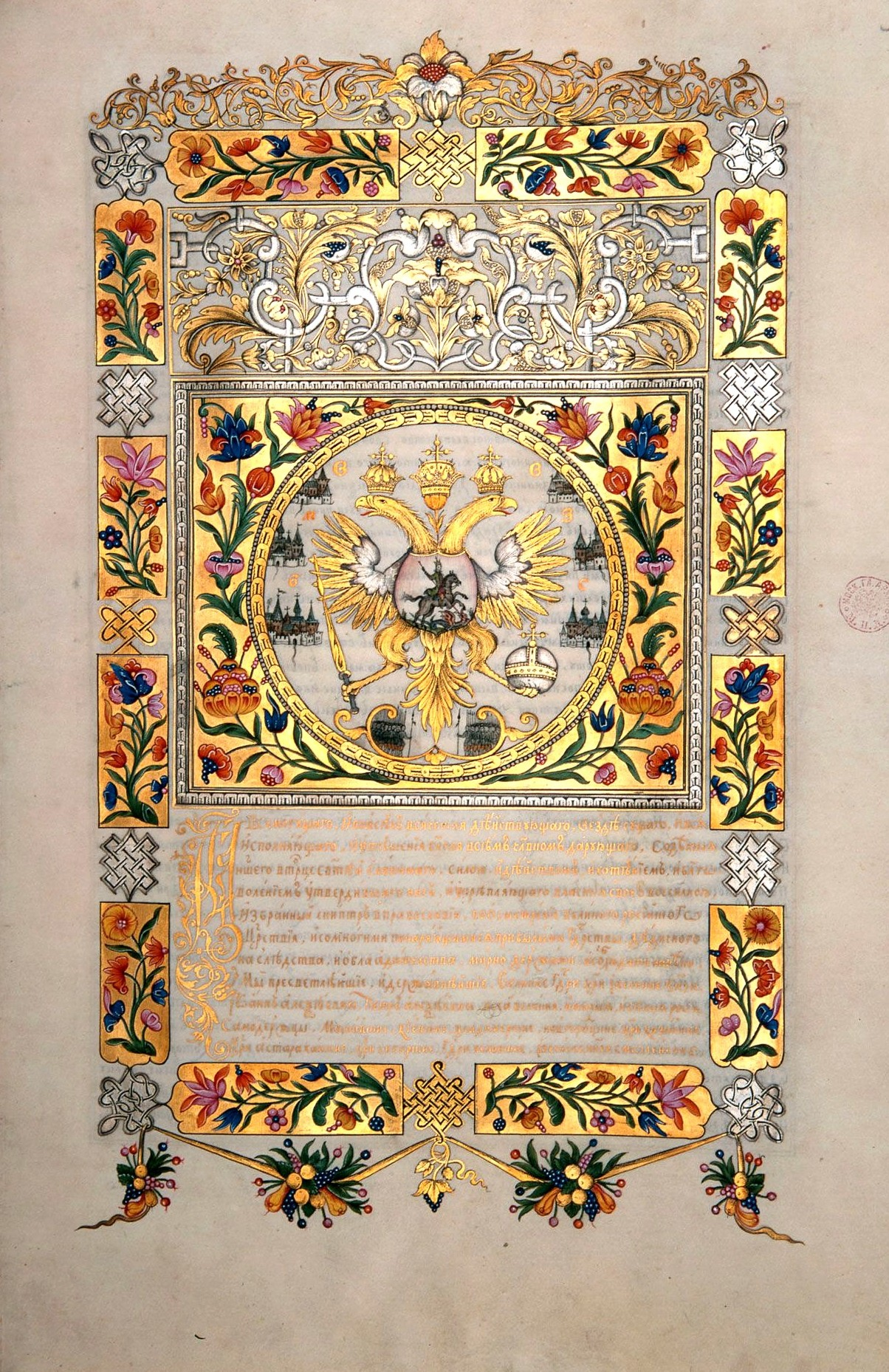
- Signed: 1686
- Location: Moscow
- Condition: 1686–1772
- Signatories: Krzysztof Grzymułtowski; Marcjan Ogiński; Vasily Vasilyevich Golitsyn

The Polish–Russian Peace Treaty of 1686, officially known as the Treaty of Perpetual Peace (Note: By "perpetual" or "eternal" peace, peace 'for an indefinite amount of time' was meant, as opposed to a temporary peace (also known as a truce or ceasefire) that would expire after a set amount of time. The parties involved did not operate under the assumption that the peace would be everlasting, i.e. that their countries would never be at war ever again. They just had no intention of going to war with each other for the foreseeable future, let alone after a set amount of time had expired, as was the case with the Truce of Andrusovo of 1667. Article 1 of the Treaty explicitly kept open the theoretical possibility that the parties might be at war again at some point in the distant future: "In this established and confirmed eternal peace, and in this holy truce, let all animosities, hostilities and ill-will which have existed on both sides up to this time and day, until the end of this present eternal peace, (....) be set aside, settled, (...).") Russian: Вечный мир, Lithuanian: Amžinoji taika, Polish: Pokój wieczysty but also known in Polish tradition as the Grzymułtowski Peace, Polish: Pokój Grzymułtowskiego) was concluded between Russia and Poland–Lithuania to finally end the Russo-Polish War of 1654–1667. It was signed in Moscow on 6 May 1686 by Polish–Lithuanian envoys Krzysztof Grzymułtowski, Voivode of Poznań and Marcjan Ogiński, Chancellor of Lithuania, as well as the Russian knyaz Vasily Vasilyevich Golitsyn. These parties were incited to cooperate after a major geopolitical intervention in the southern regions of Zaporizhzhia on the part of the Ottoman Empire.

The treaty confirmed the earlier Truce of Andrusovo of 1667. It consisted of a preamble and 33 articles. The treaty confirmed Poland–Lithuania's retention of Right-bank Ukraine, (Note: The partially Ottoman-occupied southern Kyiv Voivodeship and the Central Ukrainian voivodeships of Bratslav and Podolia.) Western Ukraine, (Note: The voivodeships of Volhynia, Ruthenia, and Belz.) present-day Belarus, (Note: The voivodeships of Minsk, Brest-Litovsk, Navahrudak, Vilnius, Polatsk, Vitsebsk, and Mstsislaw.) and Polish Livonia. On the other hand, it secured Russia's control of the Smolensk Voivodeship and Left-bank Ukraine, including suzerainty over the autonomous Left-bank Cossack Hetmanate, (Note: With the eastern Kyiv Voivodeship, the Chernihiv Voivodeship, Siveria, and Starodub, plus the right-bank city of Kiev.) as well as the autonomous Zaporizhian Sich. 146,000 rubles were to be paid to Poland as compensation for the loss of the Left Bank. Both parties agreed not to sign a separate treaty with the Ottoman Empire. By signing this treaty, Russia became a member of the anti-Ottoman coalition, which comprised Poland–Lithuania (including the recently restored Right-bank Cossack Hetmanate under Andriy Mohyla), the Holy Roman Empire and Venice. Russia pledged to organize a military campaign against the Crimean Khanate, which led to the Russo-Turkish War of 1686–1700.

The treaty was a major success for Russian diplomacy. Strongly opposed in the Polish–Lithuanian confederation, it was not ratified by the Sejm (parliament) until 1710. The legal legitimacy of its ratification has been disputed. According to Jacek Staszewski, the treaty was not confirmed by a resolution of the Sejm until the Convocation Sejm of 1764.

The borders between Russia and the Commonwealth established by the treaty remained in effect until the First Partition of Poland in 1772.

Polish-Lithuanian territorial losses 1657–1686 marked in orange

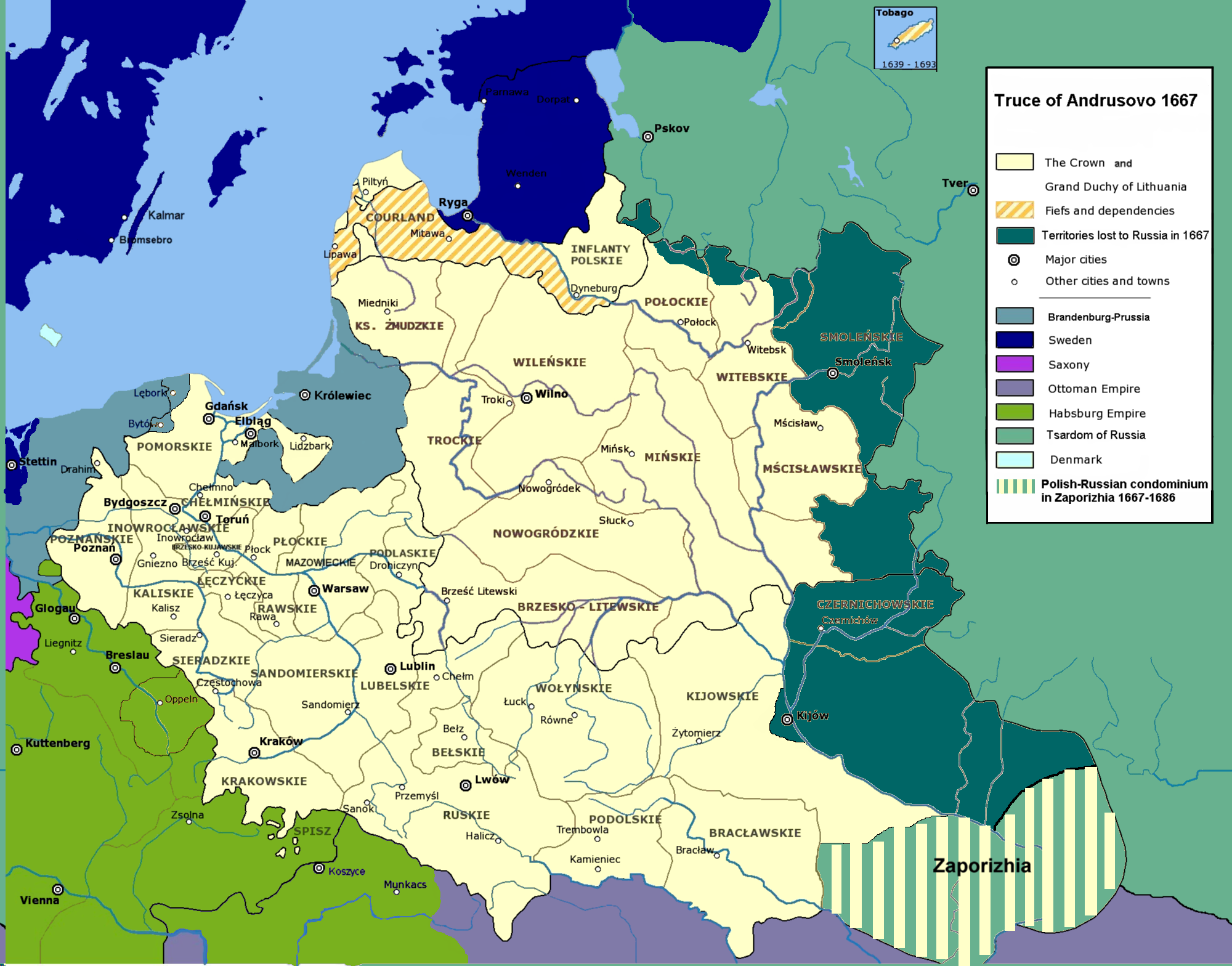
Truce of Andrusovo 1667: Russian gains in dark green

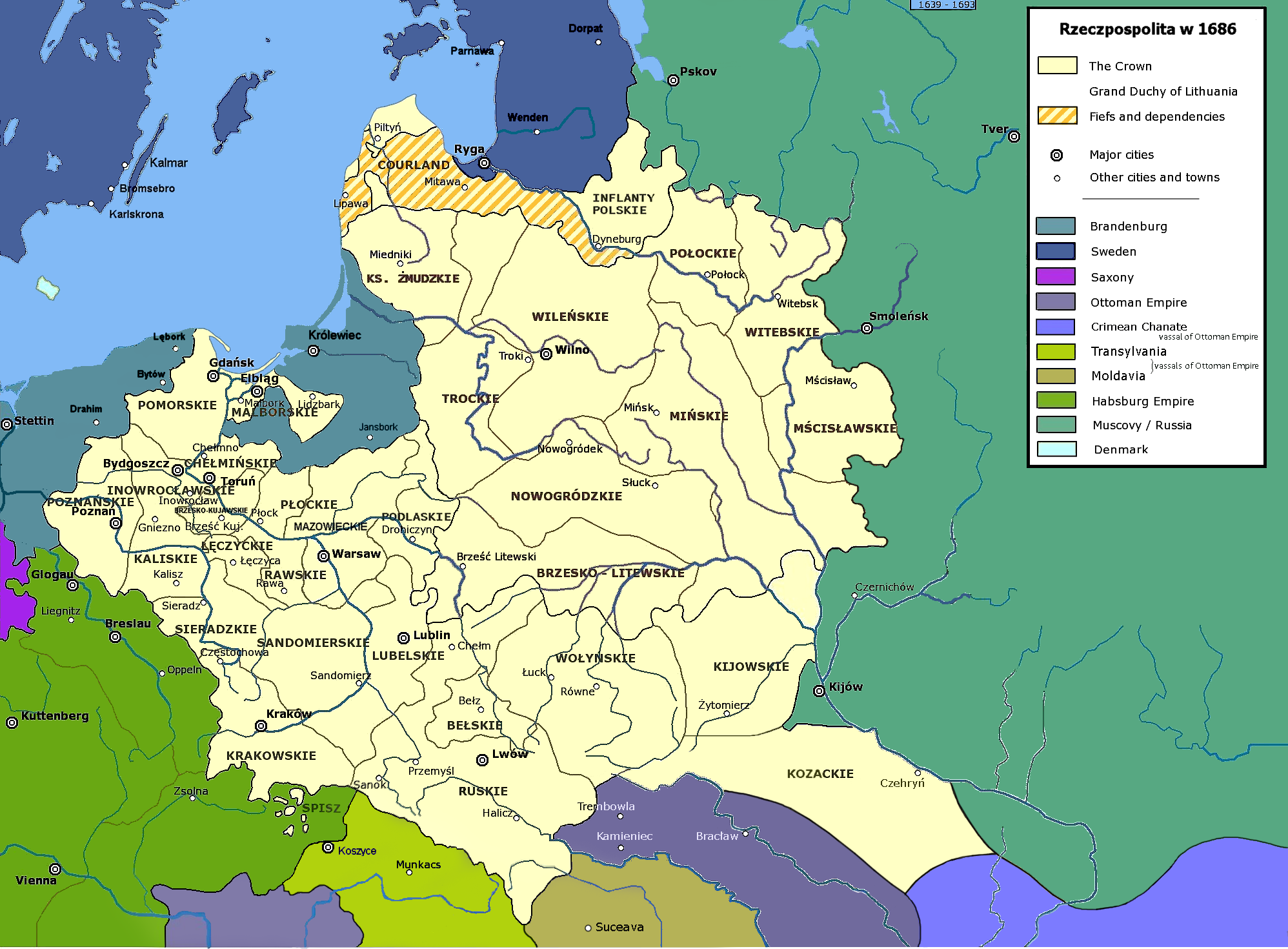
The Polish–Lithuanian Commonwealth after the 1686 treaty
