= Semen Paliy =

Zaporozhian Cossack colonel (early 1640s–1710)

- Семен Гурко
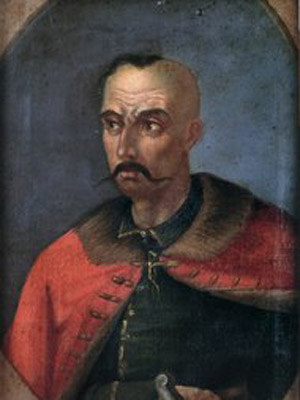
- Depiction of Semyon Paliy
- Born: c. 1640; Borzna, Kiev Voivodeship, Polish–Lithuanian Commonwealth (now Chernihiv region)
- Died: 24 January / 13 May 1710; Kyiv, Kiev Governorate
- Military career
- Allegiance: Zaporozhian Host
- Service years: 1670s – 1710
- Rank: Polkovnyk
- Conflicts: See list: Great Turkish War; Battle of Vienna; Moldavian campaign (1684–1691); Paliy Uprising; Great Northern War; Battle of Poltava; Cossack raids

Semen Palii (Old Ukrainian: Семен(ъ) Палѣй, modern Ukrainian: Семен Палiй, Polish: Semen Palej) or Semyon Paliy (Russian: Семён Палий), native surname Hurko (Ukrainian: Гурко; early 1640s – 24 January / 13 May 1710) was a Zaporozhian Cossack polkovnyk (colonel). Paliy was compared to Ivan Sirko due to his exploits against Crimean Tatars and Ottoman Turks.

== Origin ==
Semen Hurko (Note: Ukrainian: Семен Пилипович Гурко; Russian: Семён Филиппович Гурко́; Polish: Semen Pyłypowycz Hurko) was born in c. 1640. in the town of Borzna (now Chernihiv Oblast) in Left-bank Ukraine, then part of Kiev Voivodeship, Polish–Lithuanian Commonwealth. According to some reports, he studied at Kyiv Mohyla Academy. Paliy settled in the Zaporizhian Sich during 1670s, gaining fame as a brave fighter and Zaporozhian Cossack.

== Career ==
In 1683, Paliy led a force consisting of 5,000 Zaporozhian Cossacks during Battle of Vienna. In 1685, Paliy moved to Right-bank Ukraine and joined the service of Polish–Lithuanian Commonwealth, under King John III Sobieski. During his years in Polish service, he commanded Bila Tserkva Regiment and proved himself as an able Cossack commander in wars against Crimean Tatars and Ottoman Turks. Paliy had his residence in Fastiv and engaged in organization of Cossack slobodas in the area.

Among other military deeds his men achieved, Paliy's Cossacks successfully raided Ottoman fortresses, among which were Ochakov, Akkerman and Kiliya. Paliy carried out successful raids against Tatars, inflicting a series of defeats on them and taking many captive. Paliy also liberated many Christian captives and was respected by John III Sobieski for his exploits. In 1686–1687, he took part in joint campaigns with Poles into Moldavia. He became the ataman of Right-bank Ukraine, still under Polish control (while the Left-bank Ukraine was under Russian control). Paliy wanted to unify right and left-bank Ukraine, ruled by one and sole Cossack Hetman.

By the end of the 1680s Paliy, however, became wary of Polish overlordship. In 1688 he contacted Left-bank hetman Ivan Mazepa with an appeal for Moscow to accept Right-bank Ukraine as a protectorate. In 1689 he was imprisoned by Poles after attacking Nemyriv, but regained freedom after John III Sobieski's intervention next year. In 1699 a new Polish king Augustus II disbanded the Cossack militia and signed a peace treaty with Ottoman Turkey. Cossacks were angered by this situation, and in 1702 Paliy started an open rebellion against the crown, the last of the major Cossack uprisings against the Commonwealth. Together with a number of other Cossack polkovnyks, Paliy and his rebels captured Bila Tserkva, Fastiv, Nemyriv and a few other towns. Rebellious Cossacks massacred their traditional enemies - Polish szlachta, Catholic priests and Jews - in the area they controlled. The rebels sent several requests to the Left-bank hetman Ivan Mazepa, as well as to Moscow, asking the Russians to help them free right-bank Ukraine from Poland, but those remained without an answer. On October 17, 1702, Paliy and his Cossacks were defeated by the Polish army near the town of Berdychiv and later at Nemyriv and at Verbykhy in February 1703. Paliy's last stand was at Bila Tserkva.

Russian Tsar Peter I and Ukrainian hetman Ivan Mazepa, who were allied with Poland against Sweden at the time, ordered Paliy to surrender Bila Tserkva, but he and his men refused. Mazepa, who was wary of Paliy's radical social policies, convinced Peter I to allow him to intervene. In 1704 tsar's forces under the hetman's command took over major portions of Right-bank Ukraine, while Poland was weakened by the invasion of Swedish king Charles XII. Fearing the popularity of Paliy, Mazepa had him exiled to Siberia in 1705. Paliy spent the following years in Tobolsk.

In 1709, after Mazepa had switched sides and joined the Swedes against Russia, Paliy together with other enemies of Mazepa was freed from exile. During the Battle of Poltava he fought against Mazepa and Charles XII in the ranks of Cossacks loyal to Russia. After the battle he continued his service in Bila Tserkva Regiment.

== Burial ==
Semyon Paliy died on 24 January or 13 May 1710 in Kyiv and was buried in the nearby Mezhyhirya Monastery.

== Legacy ==
After his death Paliy became a folk hero of many Ukrainian songs and legends. A church in the city of Fastiv (still preserved) was named Tserkva Paliya after him.

Semyon Paliy is portrayed in later fictional literature describing his times, most notably in the Cossack series by Volodymyr Malyk.

== Bibliography ==
- Paly, Alexander (2017). Історія України (in Ukrainian). Vol. 3. Kyiv: К.І.С. ISBN 978-617-684-166-1.
- Shiyan, Roman (2006). Cossack Motifs in Ukrainian Folk Legends. Edmonton: University of Alberta. ISBN 3639012887.
