= Andrii Abazyn =

Ukrainian colonel (1634–1703)

Andrii Abaza
- Born: 1634
- Died: 1703 (aged 68–69); Sharhorod
- Relatives: Abaza Mehmet
- Military career
- Rank: Colonel
- Unit: Bratslav Regiment

Andrii Abaza (Ukrainian: Андрій Абазин; 1634–1703) was a Ukrainian colonel in the Bratslav Regiment and leader of the Cossack formations in Right-Bank Ukraine. According to a popular story, his father was an Abazа, Ottoman Grand Vizier and Pasha of the Ozu Eyalet Abaza Mehmet. Andrii's mother was daughter of Stanisław Koniecpolski, Polish Grand Crown Hetman.

== Campaigns ==
- In 1686 - 1687 Abazyn participated in the joint campaign of the Polish and Cossack troops against Turkish troops in Moldova
- Between 1691 and 1696 he led the Right-Bank Cossacks against the Tatars and the Turks at the fortresses of Kizi-Kerman, Budjak, Ochakov. Close associate of Hetman Samus, Abazа together with Pavlo Mikhnovych defeated Poles at Berdychiv
- In 1695 he defeated Tatars near Breslov
- During the anti-Polish rebellion between 1702 and 1704 he led Cossacks and Podolian inhabitants the Commonwealth. In late October 1702, together with Hetman Samus troops Andrii Abazа participated in the siege of Bila Tserkva, they took cities of Nemyriv, Bar and others.

He was badly wounded on 20 February 1703 and captured by the Poles. Later he was executed in Sharhorod.

== Family ==
- father Abaza Mehmet (1576–1634), Prince Abaza Mehmet Pasha, lived during the reign of Sultan Osman II (1618–1622)
- mother - daughter of Stanisław Koniecpolski
- wife - Safta Dotsiul
- children: Simon, Anna, Ilya, Jonah
