= 1593 =

1593 in various calendars
- Gregorian calendar: 1593; MDXCIII
- Ab urbe condita: 2346
- Armenian calendar: 1042; ԹՎ ՌԽԲ
- Assyrian calendar: 6343
- Balinese saka calendar: 1514–1515
- Bengali calendar: 999–1000
- Berber calendar: 2543
- English Regnal year: 35 Eliz. 1 – 36 Eliz. 1
- Buddhist calendar: 2137
- Burmese calendar: 955
- Byzantine calendar: 7101–7102
- Chinese calendar: 壬辰年 (Water Dragon); 4290 or 4083 — to — 癸巳年 (Water Snake); 4291 or 4084
- Coptic calendar: 1309–1310
- Discordian calendar: 2759
- Ethiopian calendar: 1585–1586
- Hebrew calendar: 5353–5354
- Hindu calendars
- Vikram Samvat: 1649–1650
- Shaka Samvat: 1514–1515
- Kali Yuga: 4693–4694
- Holocene calendar: 11593
- Igbo calendar: 593–594
- Iranian calendar: 971–972
- Islamic calendar: 1001–1002
- Japanese calendar: Bunroku 2 (文禄２年)
- Javanese calendar: 1513–1514
- Julian calendar: Gregorian minus 10 days
- Korean calendar: 3926
- Minguo calendar: 319 before ROC 民前319年
- Nanakshahi calendar: 125
- Thai solar calendar: 2135–2136
- Tibetan calendar: ཆུ་ཕོ་འབྲུག་ལོ་ (male Water-Dragon); 1719 or 1338 or 566 — to — ཆུ་མོ་སྦྲུལ་ལོ་ (female Water-Snake); 1720 or 1339 or 567

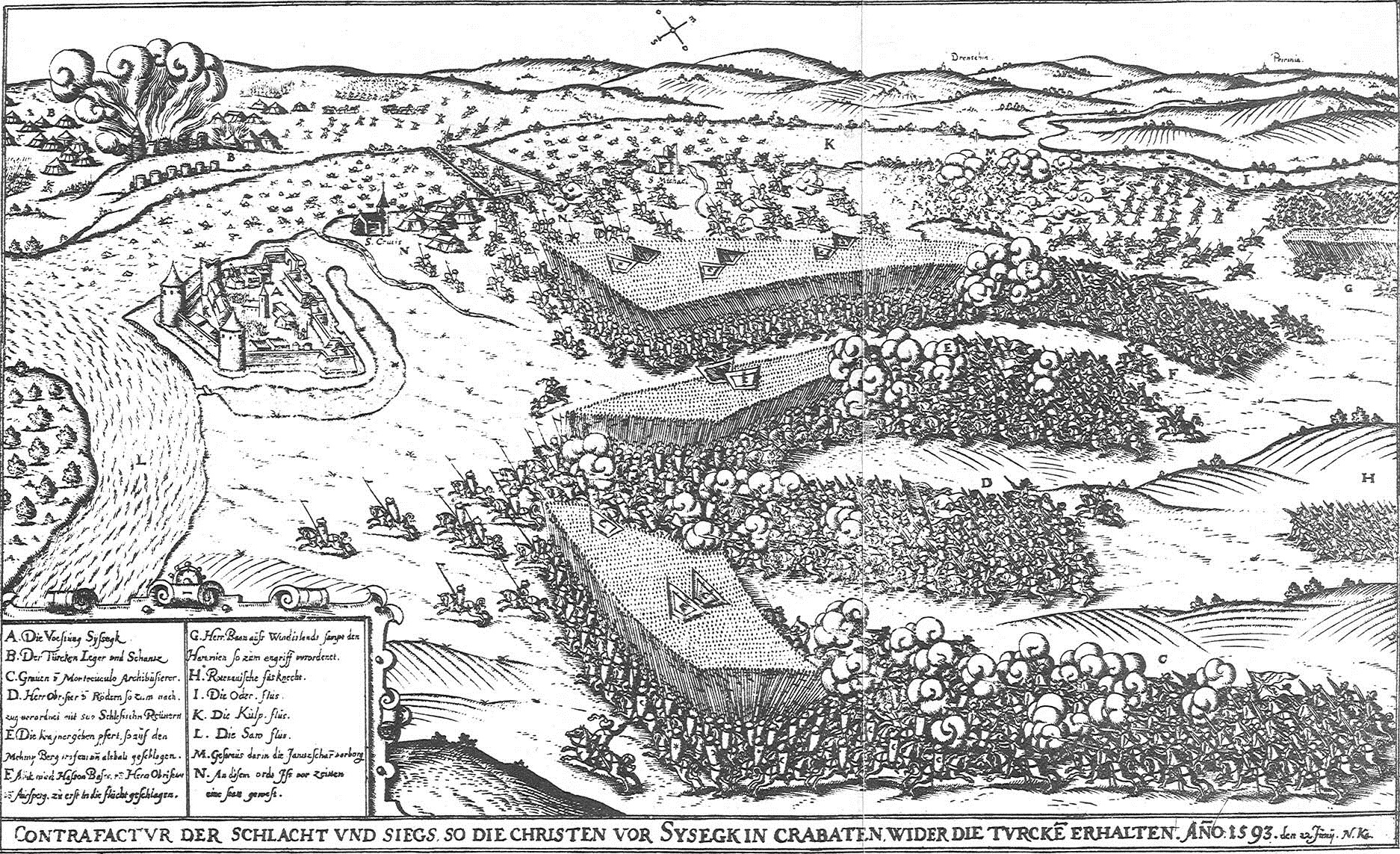
June 22: Battle of Sisak

1593 (MDXCIII) was a common year starting on Friday of the Gregorian calendar and a common year starting on Monday of the Julian calendar, the 1593rd year of the Common Era (CE) and Anno Domini (AD) designations, the 593rd year of the 2nd millennium, the 93rd year of the 16th century, and the 4th year of the 1590s decade. As of the start of 1593, the Gregorian calendar was 10 days ahead of the Julian calendar, which remained in localized use until 1923.

== Events ==
=== January–March ===
- January 25 – Siamese King Naresuan, in combat on elephant back, kills Burmese Crown Prince Mingyi Swa on Monday, Moon 2 Waning day 2, Year of the Dragon, Chulasakarat 954, reckoned as corresponding to January 25, 1593, of the Gregorian calendar, and commemorated as Royal Thai Armed Forces Day.
- January 27 – The Roman Inquisition opens the seven-year trial of scholar Giordano Bruno.
- February 2 – Battle of Piątek: Polish forces led by Janusz Ostrogski are victorious.
- February 8 – Siege of Pyongyang (1593): A Japanese invasion is defeated in Pyongyang by a combined force of Korean and Ming troops.
- February 12 – Battle of Haengju: Korea defeats Japan.
- March 7 (February 25 Old Style) – The Uppsala Synod discontinues; the Liturgical Struggle between the Swedish Reformation and Counter-Reformation ends in Sweden.
- March 14 – The Pi Day, giving the most digits of pi when written in mm/dd/yyyy format, (i.e. 3.141593, 3/14/1593) occurs, as realized later. During 1593 Flemish mathematician Adriaan van Roomen is working on the most accurate calculation of pi up to that time and arrives at 16 decimal places of pi using the polygon approximation method), and publishes it in his treatise Ideae mathematicae pars prima (Antverpiae, 1593).

=== April–June ===
- April 10 – The English Parliament enacts a law for the first military disability pension in British history, titled "An Acte for relief of Soudiours". The Act states that "forasmuch as it is agreeable with Christian Charity Policy and the Honour of our Nation, that such as have since the 25th day of March 1588, adventured their lives and lost their limbs or disabled their bodies, or shall hereafter adventure the lives, lose their limbs or disable their bodies, in defence and service of Her Majesty and the State, should at their return be relieved and rewarded to the end that they may reap the fruit of their good deservings, and others may be encouraged to perform like endeavors..."
- April 18 – Anglo-Spanish War: Naval Battle of Blaye in the Gironde estuary sees a Spanish victory over the blockading English fleet, allowing the Spanish to relieve the French Catholic garrison of Blaye.
- After April – William Shakespeare's poem Venus and Adonis probably becomes his first published work, printed in London from his own manuscript. In his lifetime it will be his most frequently reprinted work: at least nine times.
- May 5 – "Dutch church libel" bills posted in London threaten Protestant refugees from France and the Netherlands, alluding to Christopher Marlowe's plays.
- May 12 – English dramatist Thomas Kyd is arrested over the "Dutch church libel". "Atheist" literature found in his home is claimed to be Marlowe's.
- May 18 – A warrant for the arrest of Christopher Marlowe is issued. On May 20 he presents himself to the Privy Council.
- May 30 – Christopher Marlowe is stabbed to death in a dispute over a bill at a lodging house in Deptford.
- June 7 – Battle of Salbertrand in Piedmont: Victory of François de Bonne, Duke of Lesdiguières, over the Spanish of Rodrigue Alvarez of Toledo, allies of Charles Emmanuel I, Duke of Savoy.
- June 22 – Battle of Sisak in Croatia: The Habsburgs defeat the Ottoman Empire.

=== July–September ===
- July 25 – As he promised in January, Henry IV of France abjures Protestantism at the Basilica of Saint-Denis. Legend attributes to him the saying Paris vaut bien une messe ("Paris is well worth a mass").
- July 29 – The Long Turkish War breaks out in Hungary between the Habsburgs and the Ottomans.
- August 3 – Poland's council of nobles, the Sejm, grants permission to King Sigismund III Vasa and his wife, Queen consort Anne, to travel to Sweden to claim the Swedish crown.
- August 24 – After losing the Battle of Sisak two months earlier, the Ottoman Empire attacks the Austrian fortress guarding the city and breaks through its walls with cannon fire, forcing its surrender on August 30.
- September 10 – With no fortress or troops to defend Croatia, Ottoman General Mehmed Pasha captures the city of Sisak. Selânikî Mustafa Efendi, Tarih-i Selânikî (Türk Tarih Kurumu, 1999)

=== October–December ===
- October 11 – The Battle of Belleek takes place at County Fermanagh in Ireland as an English expeditionary force led by Henry Bagenal defeats Irish troops commanded by the Lord of Fermanagh.
- October 24 – Supposed date of the event described in the 1593 transported soldier legend.
- October 28 – The Siege of Coevorden begins as the Spanish Army attempts to retake a fortress captured a year earlier by the Dutch Republic and the Kingdom of England.
- November 27 – Antonio Grimaldi Cebà begins a two-year term as the new Doge of the Republic of Genoa, succeeding Giovanni Giustiniani Campi.
- December 6 – The Battle of Dryfe Sands takes place in Scotland at Annandale, between rival clans as John Maxwell leads Clan Maxwell, aided by Clan Grierson and Clan Pollock, in an invasion of the lands of Clan Johnstone, led by Sir James Johnstone. With their defense aided by Clan Scott and Clan Graham, the Johnstone clan wins the battle, but only 160 of the 600 defenders survive the fight.
- December 27 – Spanish Jesuit priest Gregorio Céspedes becomes the first Christian missionary to Korea, arriving at Busan to begin his ministry in the Buddhist kingdom of Joseon. Céspedes is able to enter Korea by coming with the Japanese invasion force of General Toyotomi Hideyoshi.

=== Date unknown ===
- Mihai Viteazul becomes prince of Walachia.
- Robert Bellarmine's Disputationes de Controversiis Christianae Fidei adversus hujus temporis Haereticos concludes publication in Ingolstadt.
- Henry Constable's Spirituall Sonnettes are written.
- The parish of Laukaa was founded.
- Khwaja Usman takes shelter in Goyghor Mosque after the Afghan rebellion against the Subahdar of Mughal Bengal, Man Singh I.
- Irish pirate queen Grace O'Malley meets with Queen Elizabeth I of England at Greenwich.
- c. 1593–1604 – According to John Warwick Montgomery, the Rosicrucian manifestos are initially composed by Tobias Hess, in anticipation of the opening of the vault in 1604, according to Simon Studion's apocalyptic timetable.

== Births ==
=== January–June ===
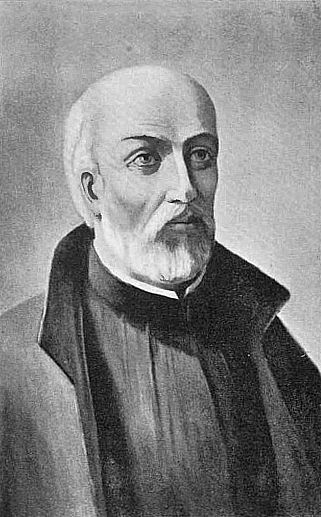
Saint Jean de Brebeuf

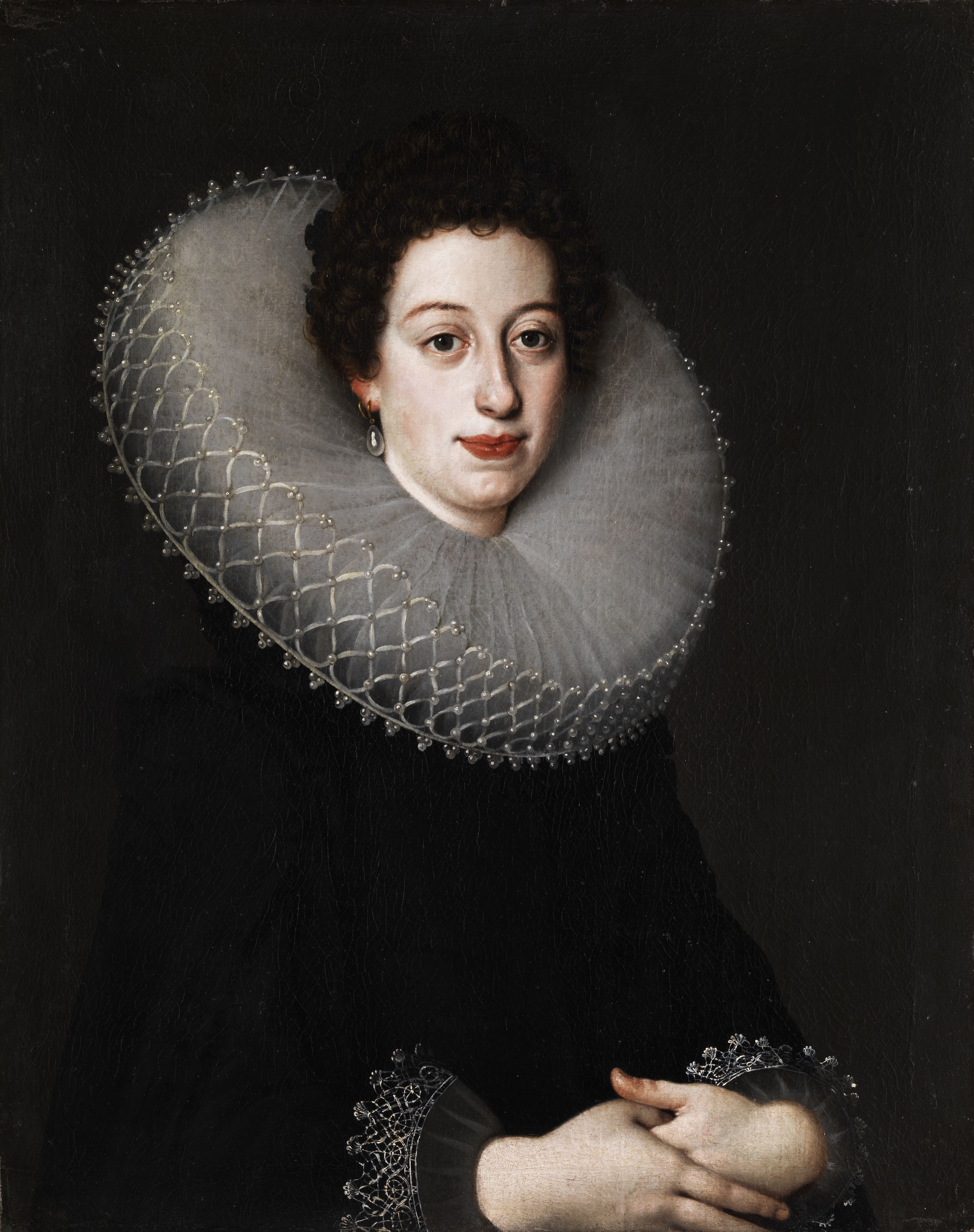
Catherine de' Medici, Governor of Siena

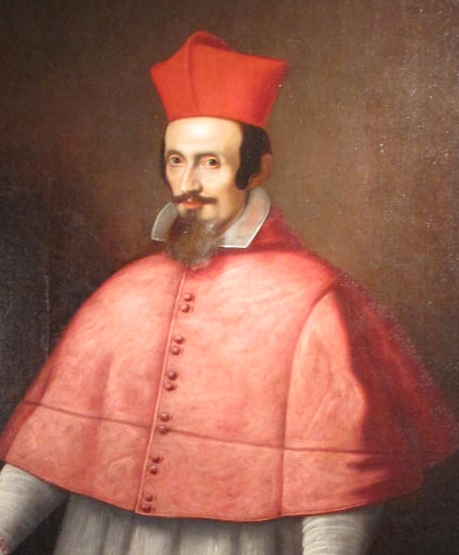
Cesare Monti

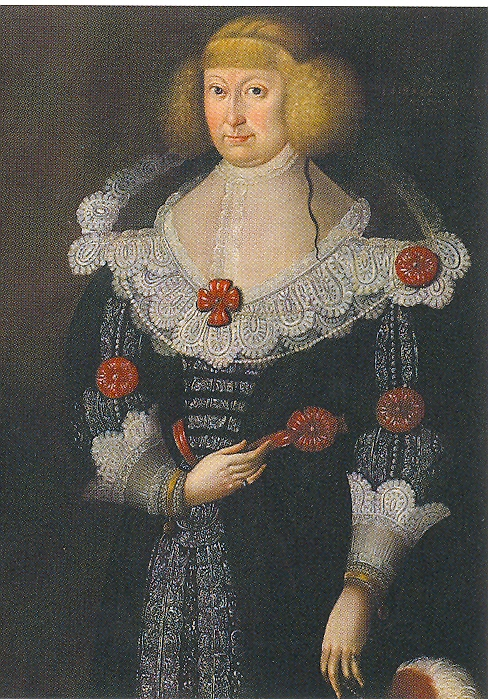
Elisabeth of Brunswick-Wolfenbuttel, Duchess of Saxe-Altenburg

- January 1 – Sun Chuanting, Ming Dynasty general (d. 1643)
- January 10 – Prince Maurice of Savoy, Catholic cardinal and Prince of Savoy (d. 1657)
- February 8 – Louis de Nogaret de La Valette, French Catholic Cardinal (d. 1639)
- February 24 – Henry de Vere, 18th Earl of Oxford, English noble (d. 1625)
- March 1 – Franz Wilhelm von Wartenberg, German Catholic cardinal (d. 1661)
- March 13 – Georges de La Tour, French Baroque painter (d. 1652)
- March 20 – Jean de La Haye, French preacher and biblical scholar (d. 1661)
- March 22 – Johann Ulrich Steigleder, German composer (d. 1635)
- March 25 – Jean de Brébeuf, French Jesuit missionary who travelled to Canada in 1625 (d. 1649)
- April – Mumtaz Mahal, Queen of India (d. 1631)
- April 3 – George Herbert, Welsh-born English poet (d. 1633)
- April 4 – Edward Nicholas, English statesman (d. 1669)
- April 12 – Nicholas Martyn, English politician (d. 1653)
- April 13 – Thomas Wentworth, 1st Earl of Strafford, English statesman (d. 1641)
- April 19 – Sir John Hobart, 2nd Baronet, English politician (d. 1647)
- April 27 – Jérôme Lalemant, French Jesuit priest and missionary to Canada (d. 1673)
- May 2
  - John Forbes, Scottish theologian (d. 1648)
  - Catherine de' Medici, Governor of Siena, Italian princess (d. 1629)
- May 5 – Cesare Monti, Italian cardinal, Archbishop of Milan (d. 1650)
- May 19
  - Jacob Jordaens, Flemish painter (d. 1678)
  - Claude Vignon, French painter (d. 1670)
- June 3 – Richard Knightley, English politician (d. 1639)
- June 8 – George I Rákóczi, Hungarian prince of Transylvania (d. 1648)
- June 22 – Sir John Gell, 1st Baronet, Parliamentarian politician and military figure in the English Civil War (d. 1671)
- June 23 – Elisabeth of Brunswick-Wolfenbüttel, Duchess of Saxe-Altenburg (d. 1650)
- June 24 – Abraham von Franckenberg, German writer (d. 1652)

=== July–December ===
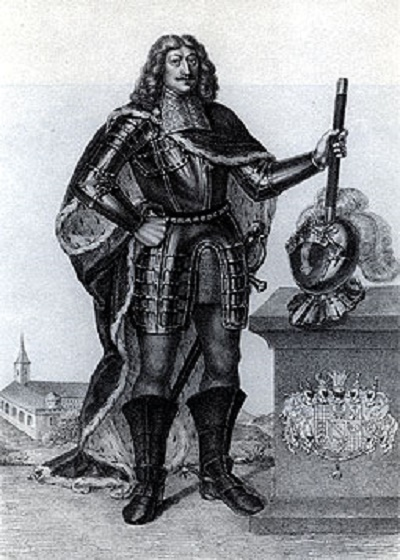
William, Margrave of Baden-Baden

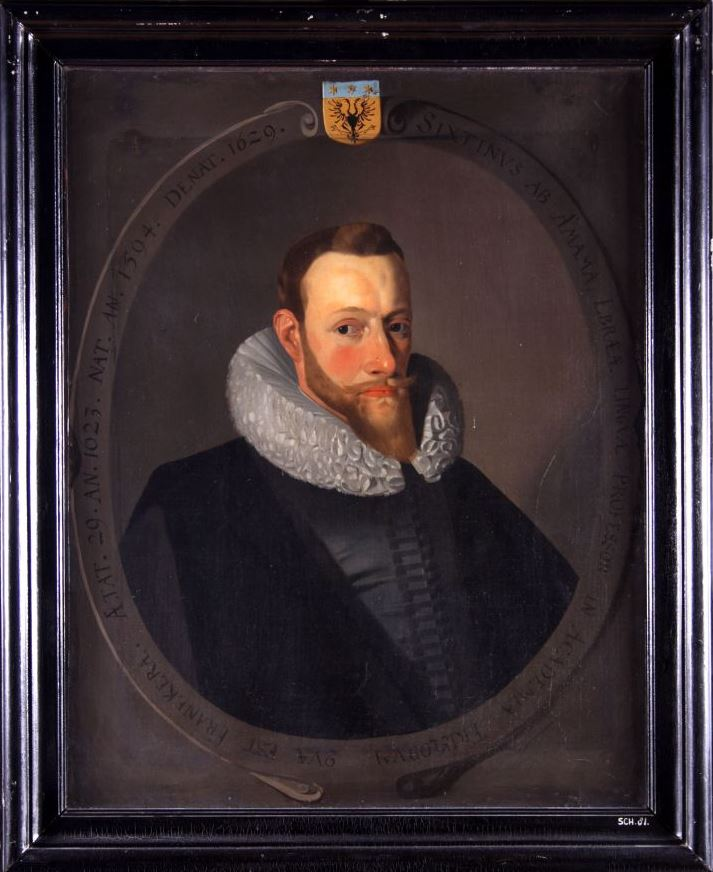
Sixtinus Amama

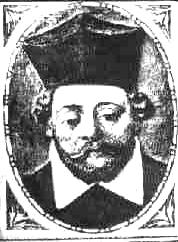
Liborius Wagner

- July 5 – Achille d'Étampes de Valençay, Knight of Malta (d. 1646)
- July 8
  - Artemisia Gentileschi, Italian painter (d. 1656)
  - Peter Sainthill, English politician (d. 1648)
- July 20 – Henry Ernest, Count of Stolberg, then count of Stolberg-Ilsenburg (d. 1672)
- July 30 – William, Margrave of Baden-Baden (1596–1677) (d. 1677)
- August 9 – Izaak Walton, English writer (d. 1683)
- August 12 – Jonathan Brewster, American settler (d. 1659)
- August 30 – Noël Juchereau, Quebec pioneer (d. 1648)
- September 5 – Orazio Riminaldi, Italian painter (d. 1630)
- September 8 – Toyotomi Hideyori, Japanese nobleman (d. 1615)
- September 20 – Gottfried Scheidt, German composer (d. 1661)
- September 22 – A. Matthäus Merian, Swiss cartographer (d. 1650)
- September 26 – Francis Osborne, English writer (d. 1659)
- October 6 – Jobst Herman, Count of Schaumburg (d. 1635)
- October 9 – Nicolaes Tulp, Dutch anatomist and politician (d. 1674)
- October 13 – Sixtinus Amama, Dutch Reformed theologian and orientalist (d. 1629)
- October 23 – Michael Warton, English politician (d. 1645)
- October 27 – Christoffer Urne, Governor General of Norway (d. 1663)
- November 1 – Abel Servien, French diplomat (d. 1659)
- November 25 – Alain de Solminihac, French bishop and beatified person (d. 1659)
- December 5 – Liborius Wagner, German Roman Catholic priest (d. 1631)
- December 11 – Sir William Airmine, 1st Baronet, English politician (d. 1651)
- December 12
  - Adam Christian Agricola, German Evangelical preacher (d. 1645)
  - Nathaniel Bacon, English politician (d. 1660)

=== Date unknown ===
- Leonardo Agostini, Italian antiquary (d. 1685)
- Louis Barbier, French bishop (d. 1670)
- Francis Russell, 4th Earl of Bedford (d. 1641)
- Claudia Rusca, Italian composer, singer, and organist (d. 1676)
- Mervyn Tuchet, 2nd Earl of Castlehaven (d. 1631)
- Anthony van Diemen, Dutch merchant (d. 1645)
- Jerónimo Lobo, Portuguese Jesuit missionary (d. 1678)
- Mikołaj Ostroróg, Polish nobleman (d. 1651)
- Sir George Radcliffe, English politician (d. 1657)
- Kimura Shigenari, Japanese samurai (d. 1615)
- Giovanni Battista Pacetti, Italian painter (d. 1630)

== Deaths ==
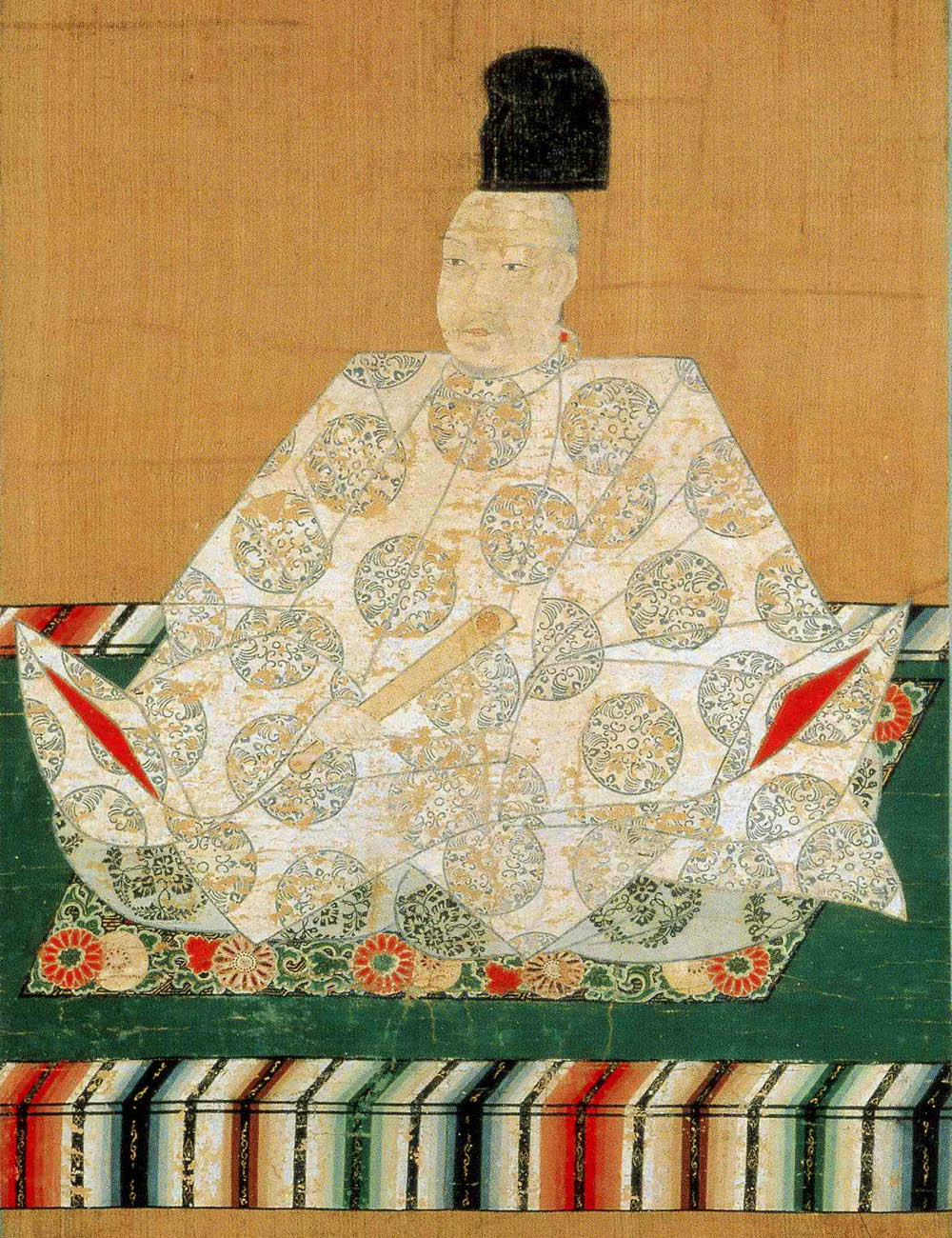
Emperor Ogimachi

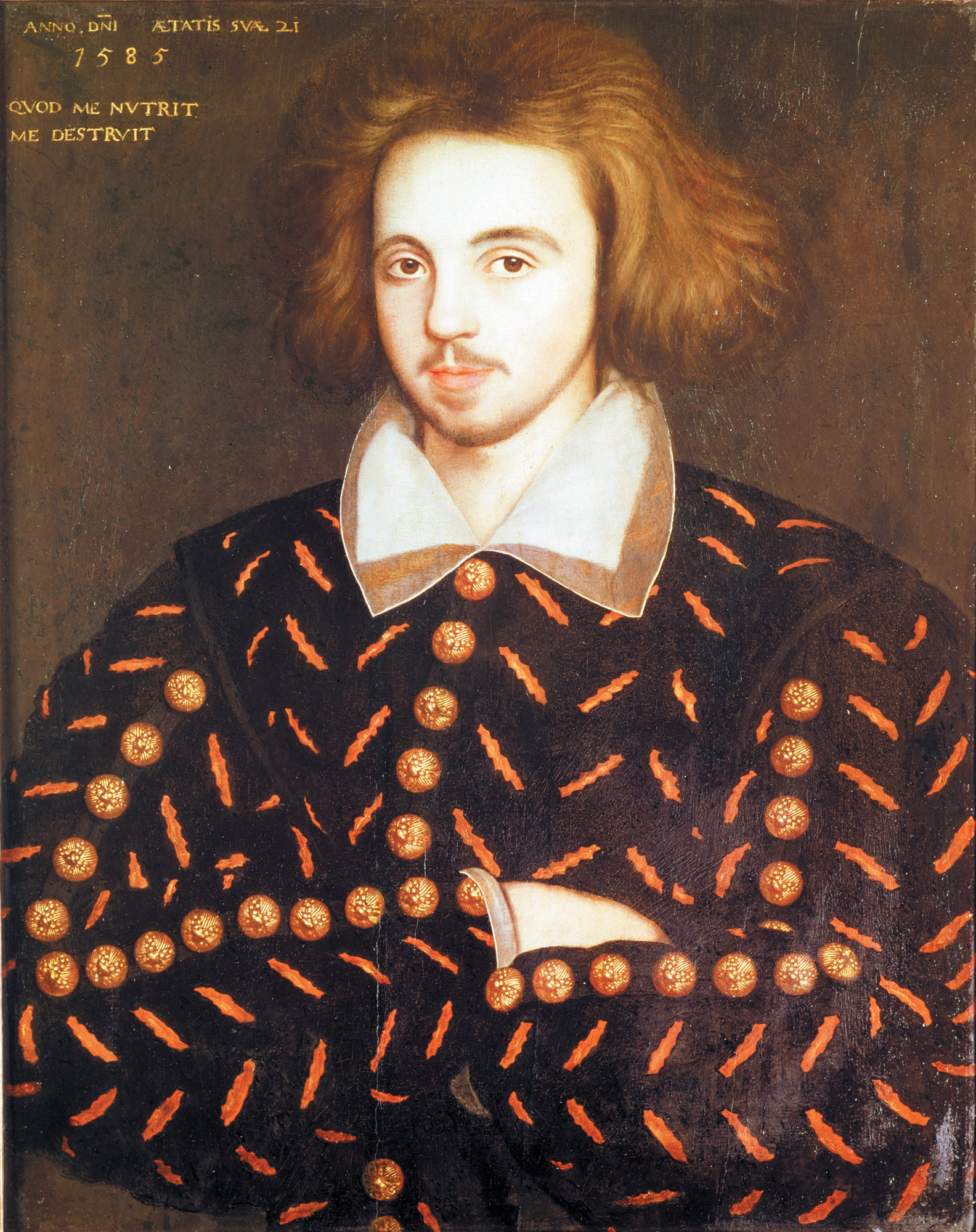
The Marlowe portrait, often claimed to be Christopher Marlowe, playwright

- January 8 – Mingyi Swa, Burmese crown prince (b. 1558)
- January 11 – Scipione Gonzaga, Italian Catholic cardinal (b. 1542)
- February 6
  - Jacques Amyot, French writer (b. 1513)
  - Emperor Ōgimachi of Japan (b. 1517)
- March 8 – Paul Luther, German scientist (b. 1533)
- March 23 – Henry Barrowe, English Puritan and separatist (b. 1550)
- April 6 – John Greenwood, English Puritan and separatist (hanged) (b. 1556)
- April 24 – William Harrison, English clergyman (b. 1534)
- May 29 – John Penry, Welsh Protestant (hanged) (b. 1559)
- May 30 – Christopher Marlowe, English poet and playwright (murdered) (b. 1564)
- June 3 – Katarina Bengtsdotter Gylta, Swedish abbess (b. 1520)
- June 25 – Michele Mercati, Italian physician and botanist (b. 1541)
- July 4 – Min Phalaung, Burmese monarch (b. 1535)
- July 11 – Giuseppe Arcimboldo, Italian painter (b. 1526)
- September 5 – Andreas von Auersperg, Carniolan noble and military commander in the battle of Sisak (b. 1556)
- September 25 – Henry Stanley, 4th Earl of Derby, English nobleman, diplomat and politician (b. 1531)
- October 25 – Gómez Pérez Dasmariñas, Spanish colonial administrator (murdered) (b. 1519)
- November 11 – Albert, Count of Nassau-Weilburg (b. 1537)
- November 20 – Hans Bol, Flemish artist (b. 1534)
- date unknown
  - Chŏng Ch'ŏl, Korean administrator and poet (b. 1536)
  - Krzysztof Kosiński, Polish noble (b. 1545)
  - Li Shizhen, Chinese physician, pharmacologist, and mineralogist (b. 1518)
