= 1645 =

1645 in various calendars
- Gregorian calendar: 1645; MDCXLV
- Ab urbe condita: 2398
- Armenian calendar: 1094; ԹՎ ՌՂԴ
- Assyrian calendar: 6395
- Balinese saka calendar: 1566–1567
- Bengali calendar: 1051–1052
- Berber calendar: 2595
- English Regnal year: 20 Cha. 1 – 21 Cha. 1
- Buddhist calendar: 2189
- Burmese calendar: 1007
- Byzantine calendar: 7153–7154
- Chinese calendar: 甲申年 (Wood Monkey); 4342 or 4135 — to — 乙酉年 (Wood Rooster); 4343 or 4136
- Coptic calendar: 1361–1362
- Discordian calendar: 2811
- Ethiopian calendar: 1637–1638
- Hebrew calendar: 5405–5406
- Hindu calendars
- Vikram Samvat: 1701–1702
- Shaka Samvat: 1566–1567
- Kali Yuga: 4745–4746
- Holocene calendar: 11645
- Igbo calendar: 645–646
- Iranian calendar: 1023–1024
- Islamic calendar: 1054–1055
- Japanese calendar: Shōhō 2 (正保２年)
- Javanese calendar: 1566–1567
- Julian calendar: Gregorian minus 10 days
- Korean calendar: 3978
- Minguo calendar: 267 before ROC 民前267年
- Nanakshahi calendar: 177
- Thai solar calendar: 2187–2188
- Tibetan calendar: ཤིང་ཕོ་སྤྲེ་ལོ་ (male Wood-Monkey); 1771 or 1390 or 618 — to — ཤིང་མོ་བྱ་ལོ་ (female Wood-Bird); 1772 or 1391 or 619

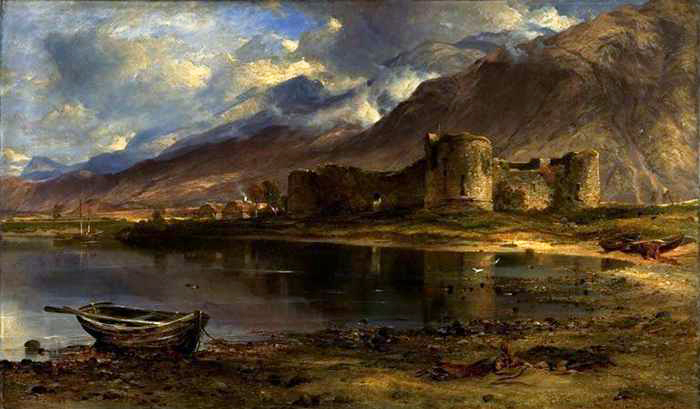
February 2: Battle of Inverlochy.

1645 (MDCXLV) was a common year starting on Sunday of the Gregorian calendar and a common year starting on Wednesday of the Julian calendar, the 1645th year of the Common Era (CE) and Anno Domini (AD) designations, the 645th year of the 2nd millennium, the 45th year of the 17th century, and the 6th year of the 1640s decade. As of the start of 1645, the Gregorian calendar was 10 days ahead of the Julian calendar, which remained in localized use until 1923.

== Events ==
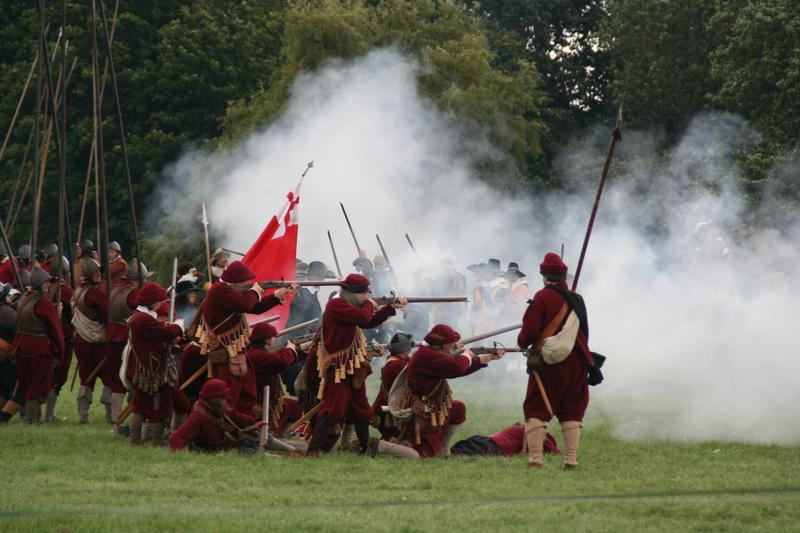
June 14: The Battle of Naseby (as shown in a re-enactment) is fought as the Parliamentarian Roundheads defeat the Royalist Cavaliers

=== January–March ===
- January 3 – The Long Parliament adopts the Directory for Public Worship in England, Wales, Ireland and Scotland, replacing the Book of Common Prayer (1559). Holy Days (other than Sundays) are not to be observed.
- January 10 – Archbishop of Canterbury William Laud is executed for treason on Tower Hill, London.
- January 14 – English Civil War: Thomas Fairfax is appointed Commander-in-Chief of the Parliamentarians.
- January 29 – English Civil War: Armistice talks open at Uxbridge.
- February 2 – Battle of Inverlochy: The Scottish Covenanters are defeated by Montrose.
- February 15 – English Civil War: The New Model Army is officially founded.
- February 28 – English Civil War: The Uxbridge armistice talks fail.
- March 4 – English Civil War: Prince Rupert leaves Oxford for Bristol.
- March 5 – Thirty Years' War – Battle of Jankau: The armies of Sweden decisively defeat the forces of the Holy Roman Empire, in one of the bloodiest battles of the war, in southern Bohemia, some 50 kilometres (31 mi) southeast of Prague.
- March 31 – Fearing the spread of the Black Death (plague), Edinburgh Town Council prohibits all gatherings except weddings and funerals.

=== April–June ===
- April 3 – The House of Lords passes the Self-denying Ordinance, requiring members of the Parliament of England to resign commissions in the armed services.
- April 10 – Because of the plague, the Edinburgh town council orders that the college graduation ceremony should be moved forward, so that students can leave the city (on November 19, teaching resumes in Linlithgow).
- April 23 (St George's Day) – English Civil War: One hundred and fifty Irish soldiers bound for service with King Charles I of England are captured at sea by Parliamentarians and killed at Pembroke in Wales.
- May 2 – Thirty Years' War – Battle of Herbsthausen (or Mergentheim): The Bavarian army, led by Franz von Mercy, catches French forces led by Marshal Henri de la Tour d'Auvergne, Vicomte de Turenne unawares, and heavily defeats them.
- May 9 – Battle of Auldearn: Scottish Covenanters are defeated by Montrose.
- June 1 – English Civil War: Prince Rupert's army sacks Leicester.
- June 10 – English Civil War: Oliver Cromwell is confirmed as the Lieutenant-General of the Cavalry.
- June 14 – English Civil War – Battle of Naseby: 12,000 Royalist forces are beaten by 15,000 Parliamentarian soldiers.
- June 28 – English Civil War: The Royalists lose Carlisle.

=== July–September ===
- July 2 – English Civil War: Battle of Alford – Alford, Aberdeenshire.
- July 10 – English Civil War: Battle of Langport – Cromwell wins in Somerset.
- July 21 – Qing dynasty regent Dorgon issues a queue order ordering all Han Chinese men to shave their forehead, and braid the rest of their hair into a queue, identical to those of the Manchus.
- July 23 – Tsar Alexei Mikhailovich of Russia comes to the throne.
- July 30 – English Civil War: Scottish Covenanters under Lord Leven begin the Siege of Hereford, a Royalist stronghold.
- August 23 (August 13 Old Style) – The Treaty of Brömsebro is signed between Sweden and Denmark–Norway, ending the Torstenson War and ceding Jemtland, Herjedalen, Gotland and Ösel (Saaremaa) to Sweden, which also holds the province of Halland for a period of 30 years, as a guarantee.
- September 1 – English Civil War: Scottish Covenanters abandon the Siege of Hereford and retreat northwards
- September 10 – English Civil War: Prince Rupert surrenders Bristol.
- September 13 – Scotland in the Wars of the Three Kingdoms: Battle of Philiphaugh – The Covenanters under Sir David Leslie defeat the Royalists under Montrose near Selkirk in the Scottish Borders, restoring the power of the Committee of Estates. After the battle, prisoners and 300 camp followers (many of them women and children) are slaughtered by Covenanters in cold blood.
- September 24 – English Civil War: Battle of Rowton Heath – Parliamentarians defeat the Royalist cavalry.

=== October–December ===
- October 8–14 – English Civil War: The Third siege of Basing House by Oliver Cromwell results in its destruction.
- October 8 – Jeanne Mance founds the Hôtel-Dieu de Montréal, the first hospital in North America.
- October 11 – English Civil War: Re-fortification of Bourne Castle in Lincolnshire against a threatened Royalist attack begins.
- November 20 – The Colegio de Santo Tomas is elevated by Pope Innocent X into the University of Santo Tomas, in his brief In Supreminenti. It has the oldest extant University Charter in the Philippines, as well as the whole of Asia.
- December 18 – English Civil War: The Royalist stronghold of Hereford is seized in a swift attack by Parliamentary forces under John Birch.

=== Date unknown ===
- Bamana forces from Ségou invade the Mali heartland, destroying the Mali Empire after its 400 years as a unified state.
- The Stolberg-Wernigerode branch of the family of the counts of Stolberg and Wernigerode is founded in Germany.
- The Solar cycle enters the 70-year Maunder Minimum, during which sunspots will be rare.
- Wallpaper begins to replace tapestries, as a wall decoration.
- The Roxbury Latin School is founded.

== Births ==
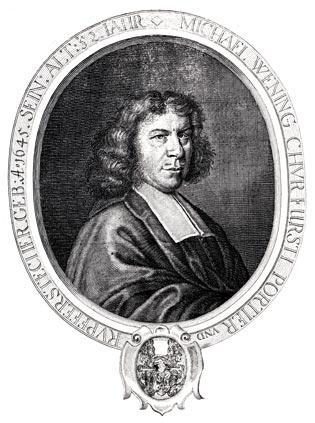
Michael Wening

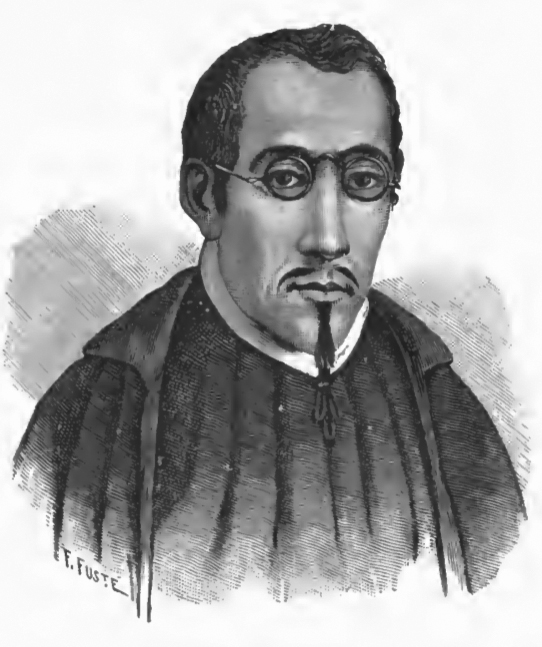
Carlos de Sigüenza y Góngora

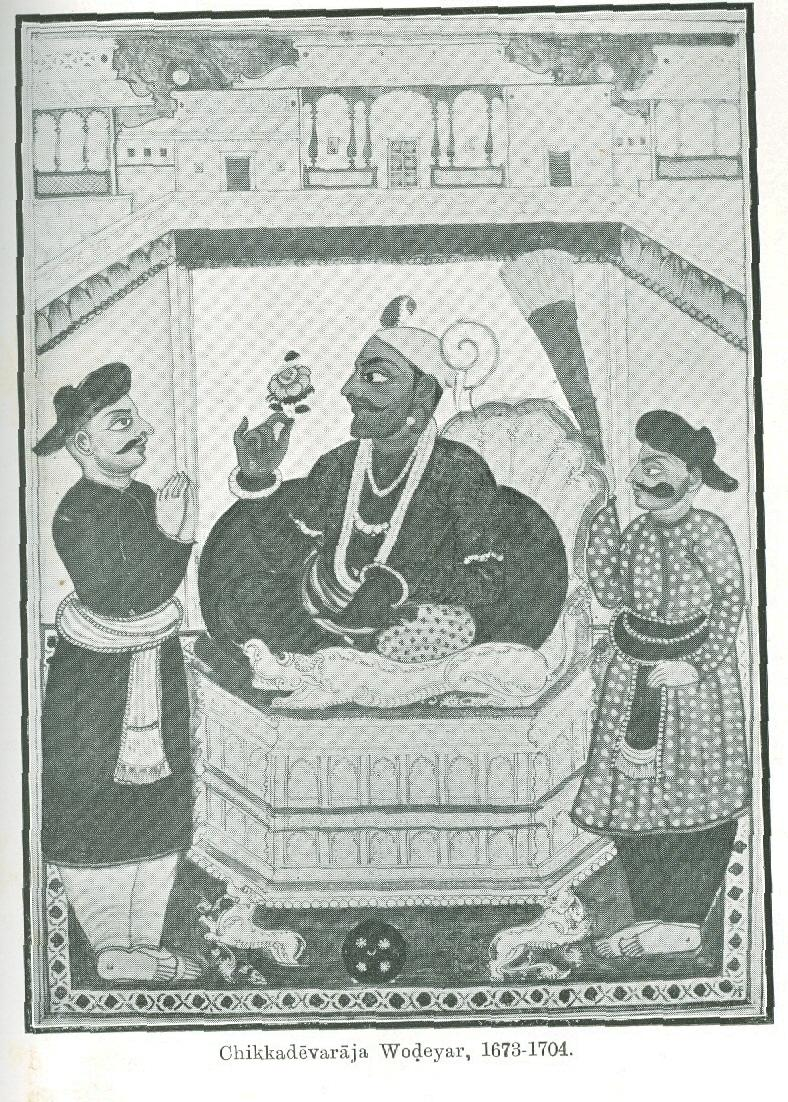
Chikka Devaraja

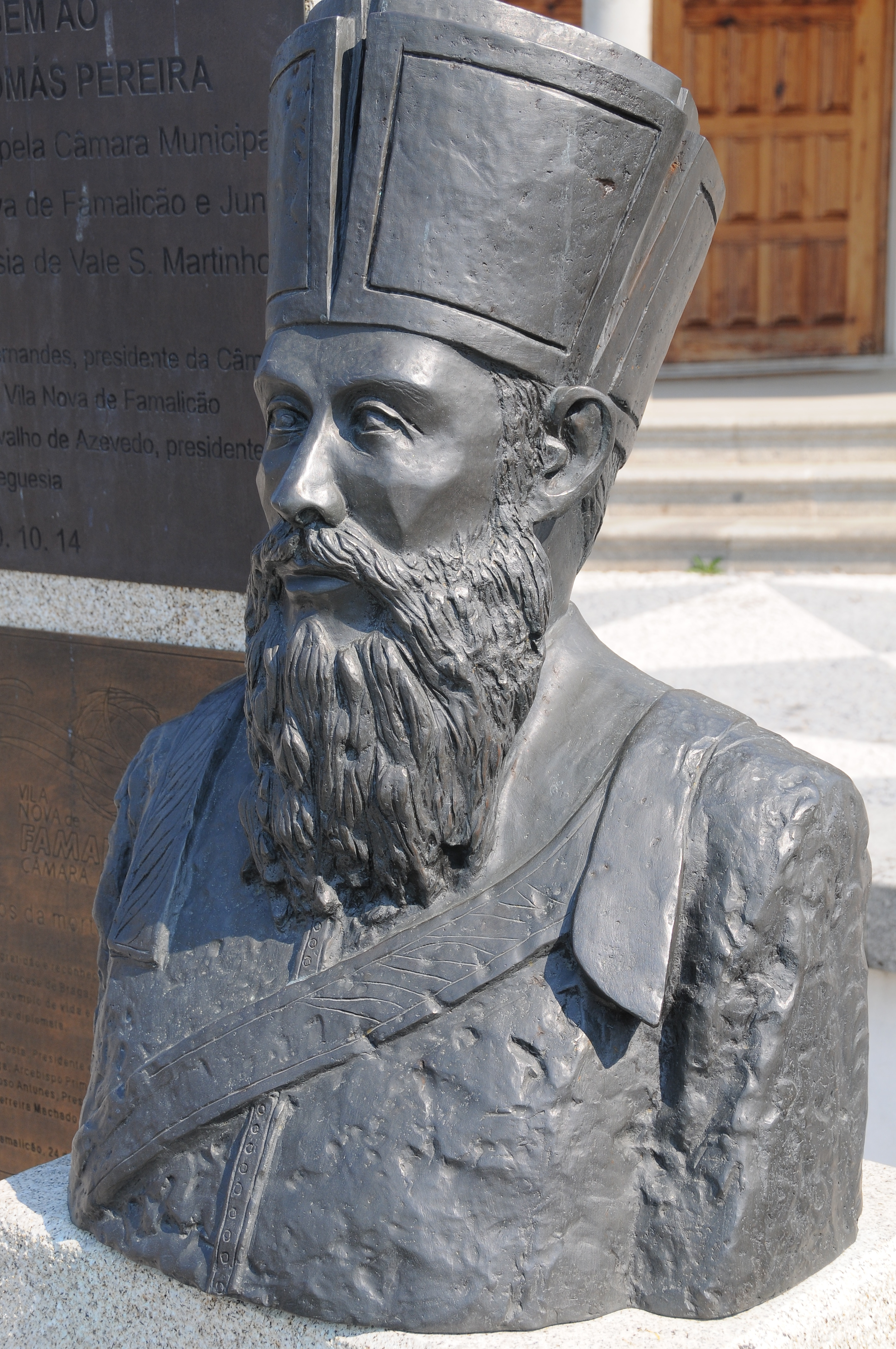
Thomas Pereira

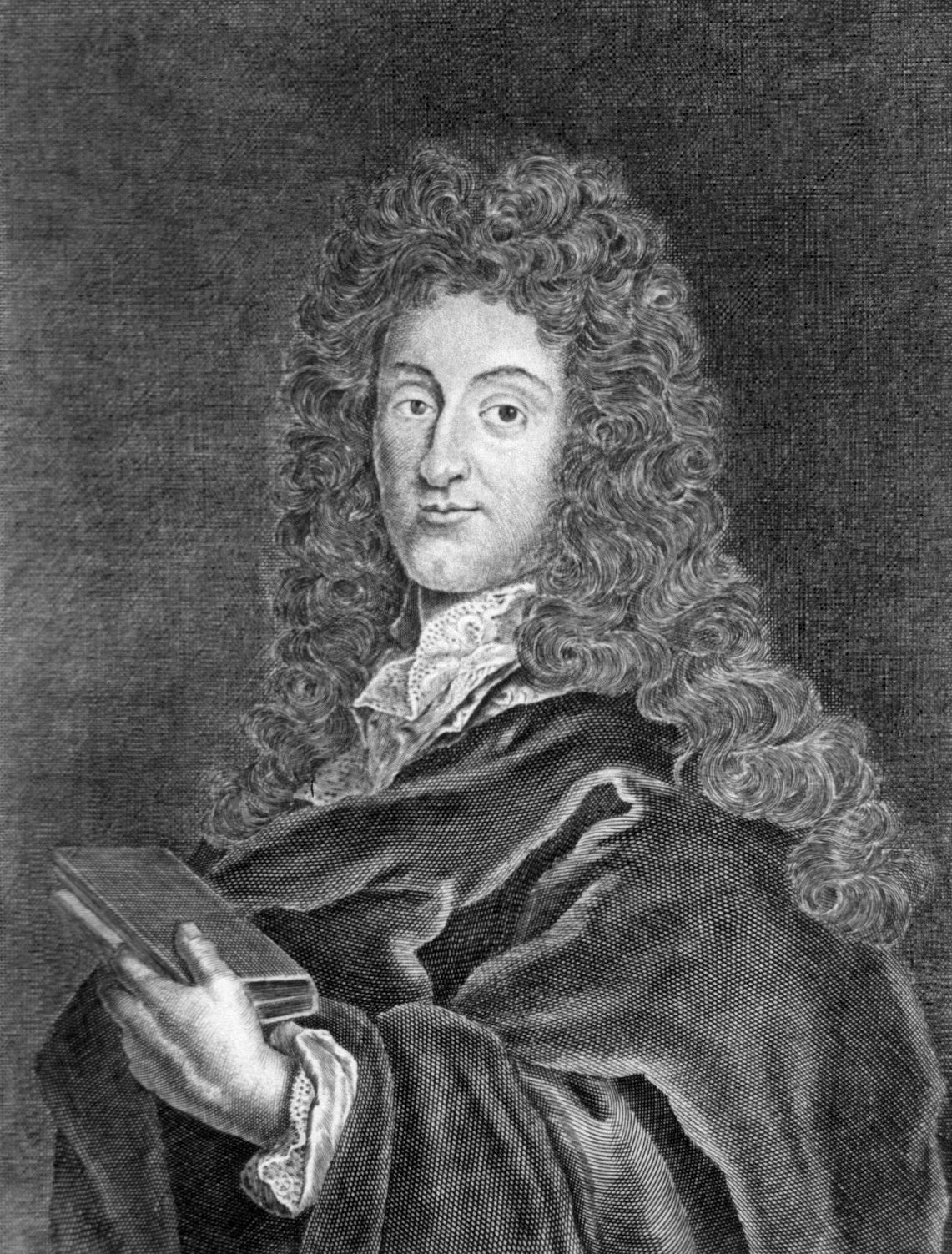
Nicolas Lemery

=== January–March ===
- January 9 – Sir William Villiers, 3rd Baronet, English politician (d. 1712)
- January 22 – Isaac Addington, longtime functionary of various colonial governments of Massachusetts (d. 1719)
- January 28 – Gottfried Vopelius, German academic (d. 1715)
- February 9 – Johann Aegidius Bach, German organist, father of Johann Bernhard Bach (d. 1716)
- February 16 – John Sharp, English Archbishop of York (d. 1714)
- February 13 – Vere Fane, 4th Earl of Westmorland, England (d. 1693)
- February 22
  - Johann Ambrosius Bach, German musician (d. 1695)
  - Johann Christoph Bach, German composer (d. 1693)
- February 24 – Francis I Rákóczi, Hungarian prince of Transylvania (d. 1676)
- March – Alexander Chalmers Polish-Scottish merchant, jurist, and politician, mayor of Old Warsaw (d. 1703)
- March 17 – Peter Du Cane, the elder, British noble Huguenot refugee (d. 1714)
- March 20 – Arthur Brownlow, Anglo-Irish politician (d. 1711)
- March 25 – Marco Battaglini, Italian Catholic bishop (d. 1717)

=== April–June ===
- April 3 – François Vachon de Belmont, French Catholic bishop (d. 1732)
- April 11 – Juan del Valle y Caviedes, Spanish-born Peruvian poet (d. 1697)
- April 22 – Christine of Baden-Durlach, German noblewoman (d. 1705)
- May 3 – Thomas Maule, prominent Quaker in colonial Salem (d. 1724)
- May 14 – François de Callières, French writer and diplomat (d. 1717)
- May 15 – George Jeffreys, 1st Baron Jeffreys, British judge (d. 1689)
- June 13 – Giacomo Cantelmo, Italian Catholic cardinal (d. 1702)
- June 14 – Haquin Spegel, Swedish bishop (d. 1714)
- June 15 – Sidney Godolphin, 1st Earl of Godolphin, English politician (d. 1712)

=== July–September ===
- July 11 – Michael Wening, German engraver (d. 1718)
- July 27 – Frederik Johan van Baer, Dutch army commander (d. 1713)
- July 28 – Marguerite Louise d'Orléans, French princess (d. 1721)
- August – Charles Louis Simonneau, French engraver (d. 1728)
- August 3 – August Kühnel, German composer and violist (d. 1700)
- August 5 – Charles Schomberg, 2nd Duke of Schomberg, Prussian general (d. 1693)
- August 10 – Eusebio Kino, Italian Catholic missionary (d. 1711)
- August 14 – Carlos de Sigüenza y Góngora, Mexican academic (d. 1700)
- August 16 – Jean de La Bruyère, French writer (d. 1696)
- August 25 – Jacob van Wassenaer Obdam, Dutch general (d. 1714)
- August 30 – Giuseppe Avanzi, Italian painter (d. 1718)
- September 10 – Romeyn de Hooghe, Dutch Golden Age painter, engraver, and sculptor (d. 1708)
- September 21 – Louis Jolliet, French Canadian explorer known for his discoveries in North America (d. 1700)
- September 22 – Chikka Devaraja, Ruler of Mysore (d. 1704)
- September 25 – Naitō Kiyokazu, Japanese daimyō who ruled the Takatō Domain (d. 1714)

=== October–December ===
- October 1 – John Alford, English politician (d. 1691)
- October 7 – Bernard Desjean, Baron de Pointis, French admiral and privateer (d. 1707)
- October 21 – Christine Charlotte of Württemberg, Regent of East Frisia (d. 1699)
- October 26 – Aert de Gelder, Dutch painter (d. 1727)
- October 28 – John Philip II, Wild- and Rhinegrave of Salm-Dhaun, German noble (d. 1693)
- November 1 – Thomas Pereira, Portuguese Jesuit mathematician (d. 1708)
- November 6 – Johann Gottfried von Guttenberg, Prince-Bishop of Würzburg (d. 1698)
- November 11 – Govert van der Leeuw, Dutch painter (d. 1688)
- November 12 – Georg Wolfgang Wedel, German physician, surgeon, botanist, chemist, philosopher (d. 1721)
- November 17 – Nicolas Lemery, French chemist (d. 1715)
- November 30 – Andreas Werckmeister, German organist, music theorist, and composer (d. 1706)
- December 3 – Michał Stefan Radziejowski, Polish Catholic cardinal (d. 1705)
- December 6 – Maria de Dominici, Maltese artist (d. 1703)
- December 14 – Jacob de Wilde, Dutch civil servant, art collector (d. 1721)
- December 24 – Hans Carl von Carlowitz, German forester (d. 1714)
- December 27 – Giovanni Antonio Viscardi, Swiss architect (d. 1713)

=== Date unknown ===
- Giovanni Antonio Fumiani, Venetian painter of the Baroque period (d. 1710)

=== Probable ===
- Captain William Kidd, Scottish pirate (d. 1701)

== Deaths ==
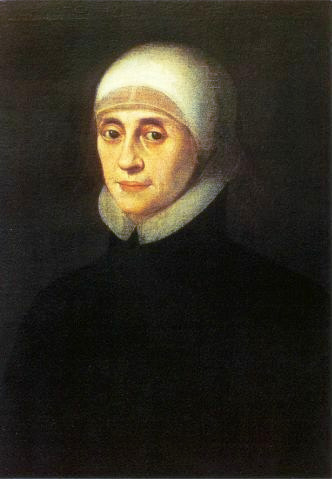
Venerable Mary Ward

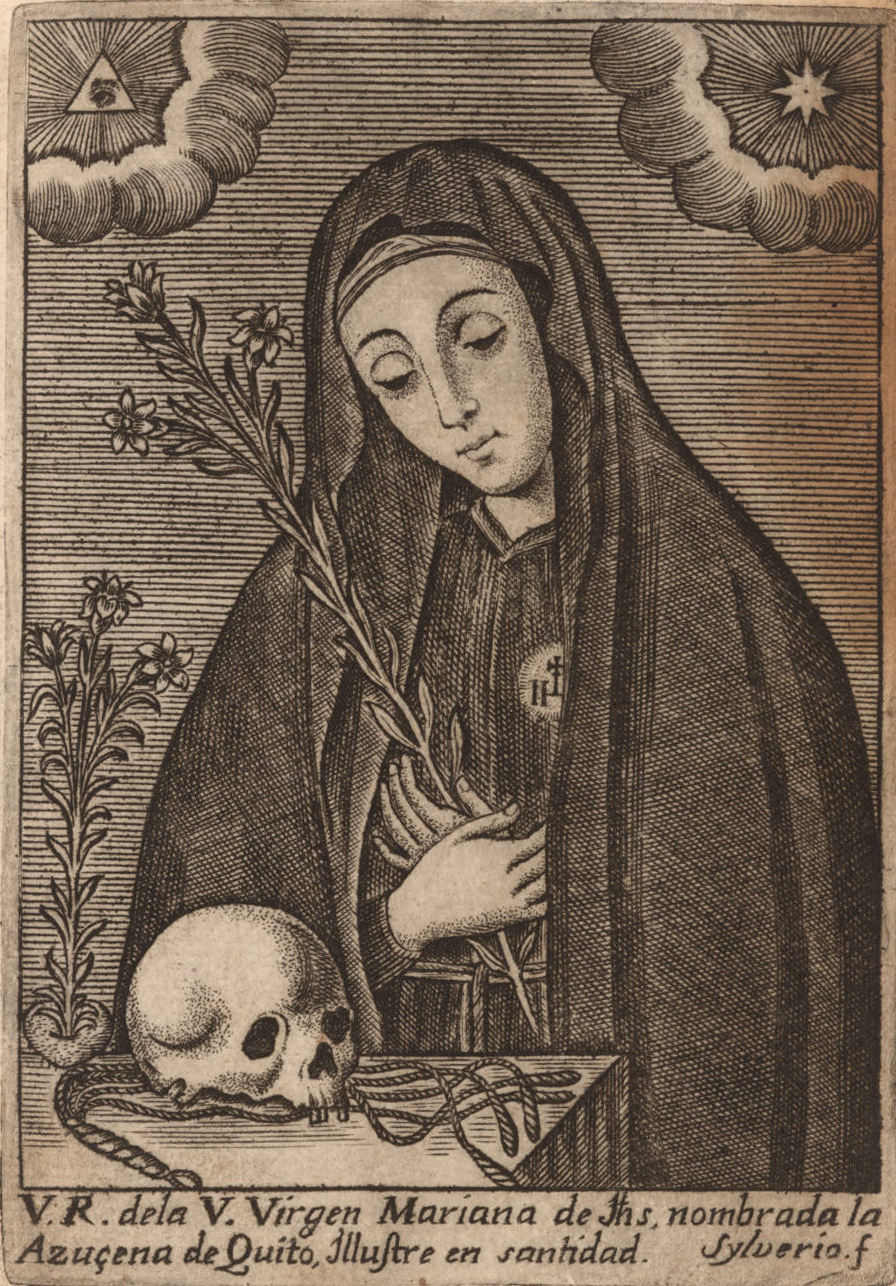
Saint Mariana de Jesús de Paredes

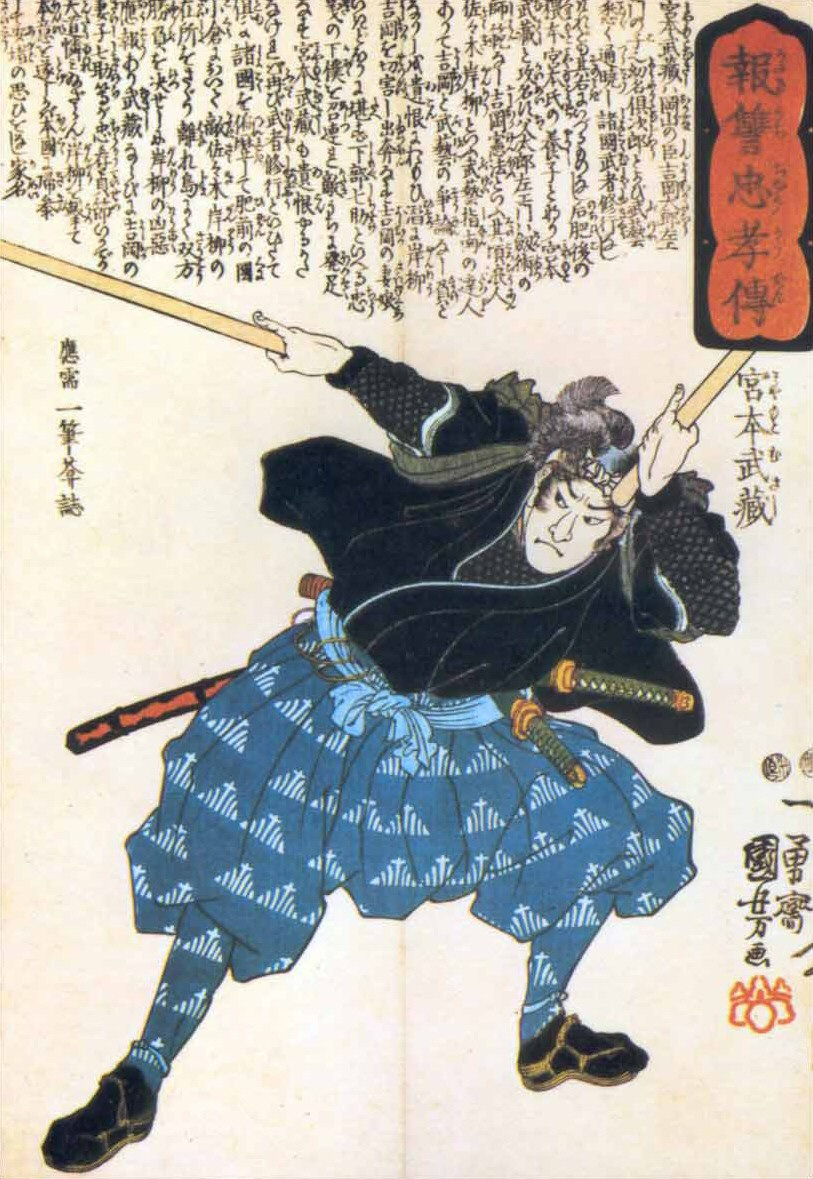
Miyamoto Musashi

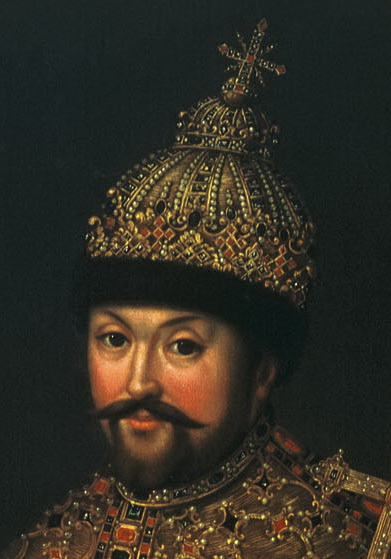
Tsar Michael I of Russia

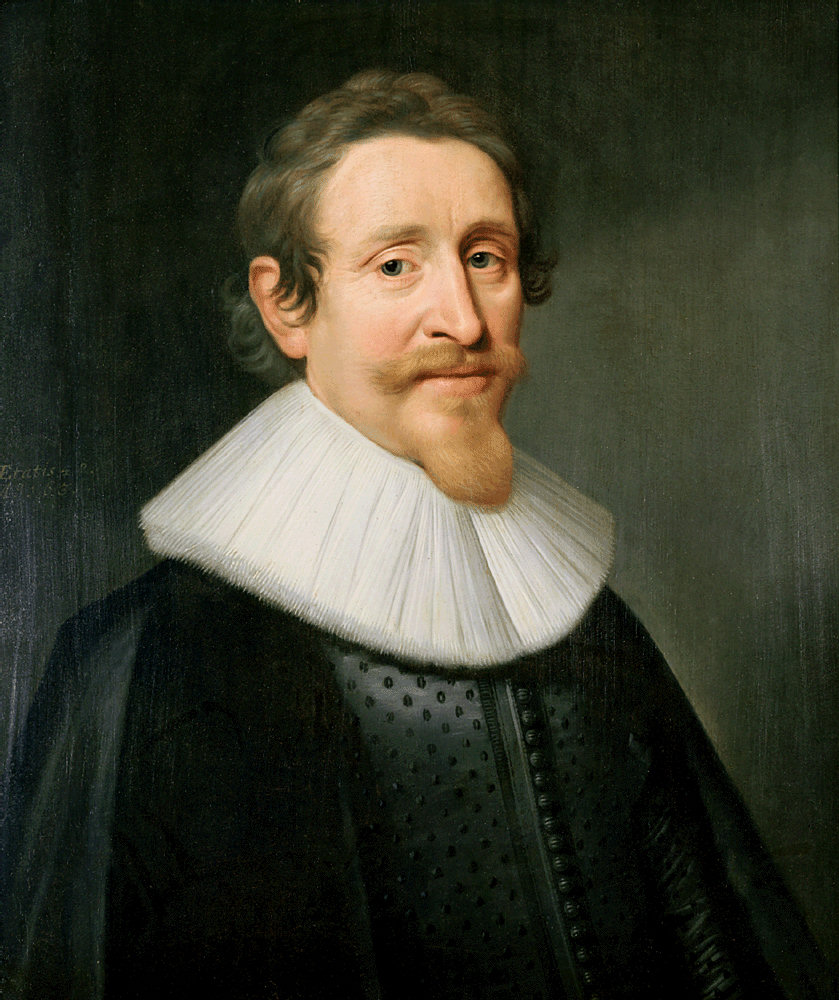
Hugo Grotius

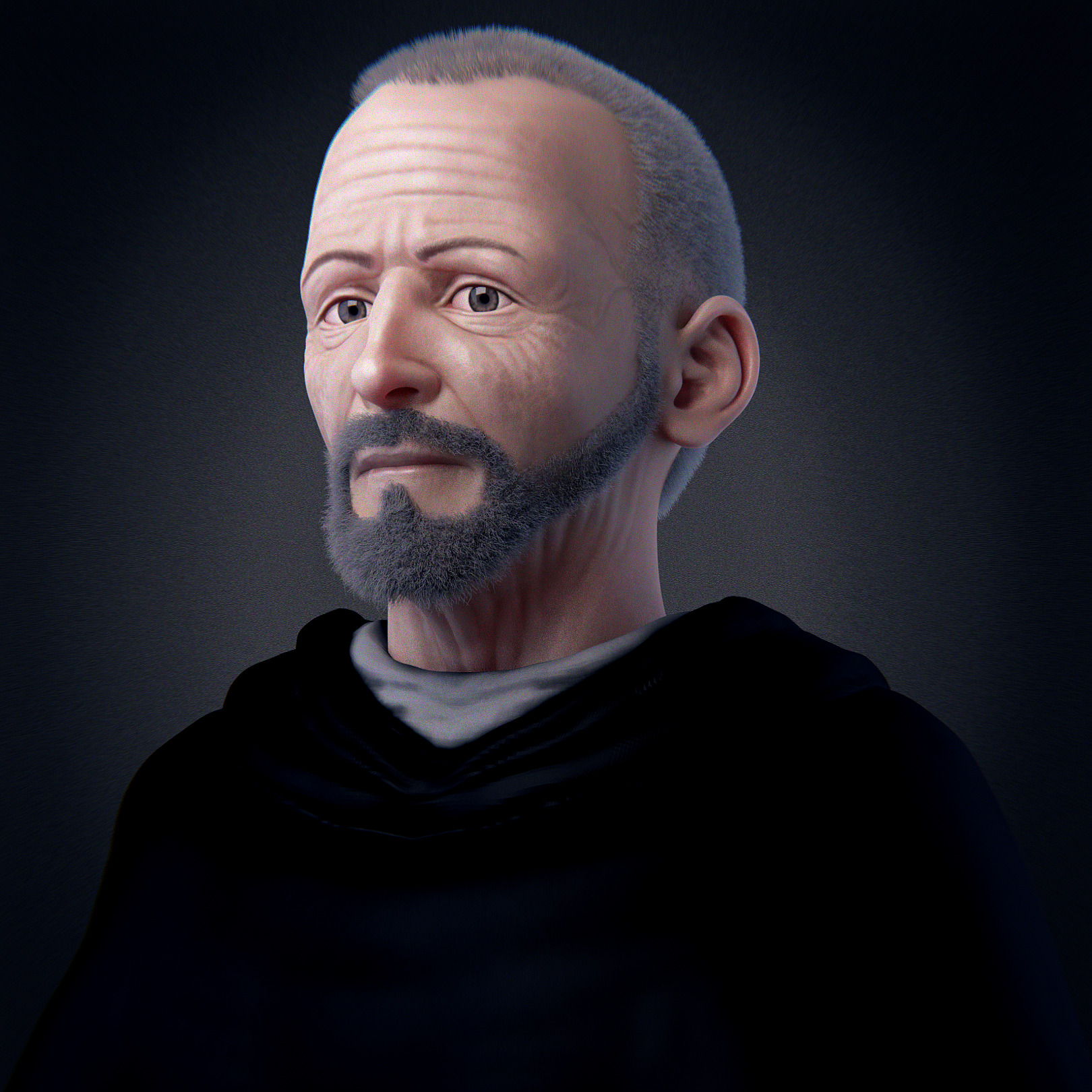
Saint John Macias

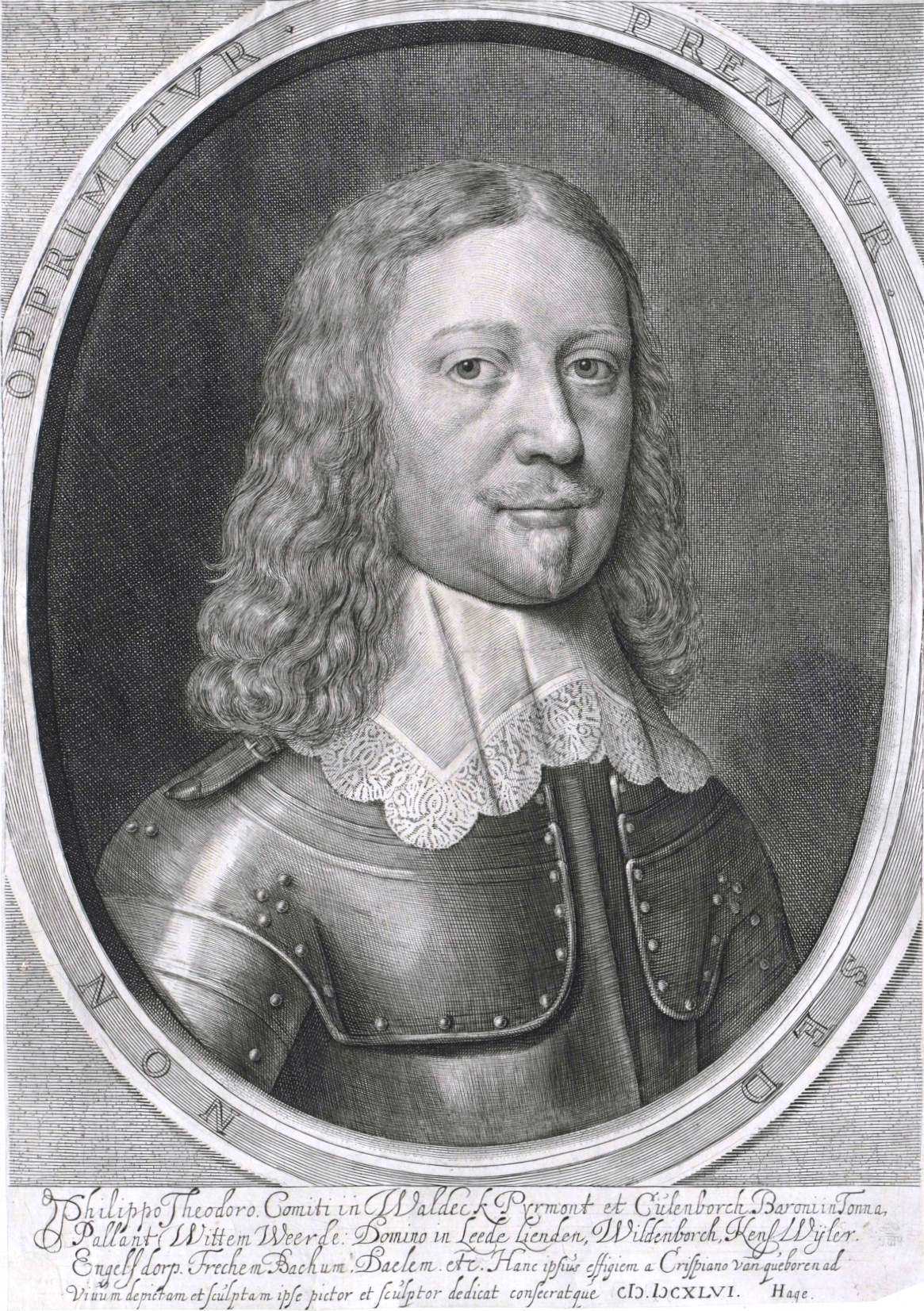
Philip Dietrich, Count of Waldeck

- January 2 – Agnes of Limburg-Styrum, Abbess of Elten, Vreden, Borghorst and Freckenhorst (b. 1563)
- January 10 – William Laud, Archbishop of Canterbury (b. 1573)
- January 11 – Henry Gage, Royalist officer in the English Civil War (b. 1597)
- January 17 – Pál Esterházy, Hungarian noble (b. 1587)
- January 24 – Giovanni Branca, Italian architect and engineer (b. 1571)
- January 30 – Mary Ward, English Roman Catholic Religious Sister and Venerable (b. 1585)
- January 31 – Hans Ulrik Gyldenløve, illegitimate son of King Christian IV of Denmark and his mistress (b. 1615)
- February 9 – Mutio Vitelleschi, Italian Jesuit Superior General (b. 1563)
- February 10 – Dorothea Sophia, Abbess of Quedlinburg Abbey (b. 1587)
- February 14 – François de La Rochefoucauld, French Catholic cardinal (b. 1558)
- February 16 – Gonzalo Fernández de Córdoba, Spanish general (b. 1585)
- February 24 – Philip VII, Count of Waldeck-Wildungen (1638–1645) (b. 1613)
- March 4 – Matthias Hoe von Hoenegg, German theologian (b. 1580)
- March 5 – Johann von Götzen, Imperial General
- March 24 – Sir Thomas Aston, 1st Baronet, English politician (b. 1600)
- April 6 – William Burton, British antiquarian (b. 1575)
- April 16 – Tobias Hume, English composer (b. 1559)
- April 17 – Daniel Featley, English theologian and controversialist (b. 1582)
- April 29 – Maximilian of Liechtenstein, Austrian nobleman and Imperial General (b. 1578)
- May 20 – Shi Kefa, Chinese Ming Dynasty official (b. 1601)
- May 21 – Crown Prince Sohyeon, Korean crown prince (b. 1612)
- May 26 – Mariana de Jesús de Paredes, Ecuadorian Roman Catholic hermit and saint (b. 1618)
- May 29 – Adam Christian Agricola, German Evangelical preacher (b. 1593)
- June 13 – Miyamoto Musashi, Japanese swordsman (b. c. 1584)
- July 7 – Georg Friedrich of Hohenlohe-Neuenstein-Weikersheim, officer and amateur poet (b. 1569)
- July 13 – Marie de Gournay, French writer (b. 1565)
- July 17 – Robert Carr, 1st Earl of Somerset, Scottish politician (b. c. 1590)
- July 22 – Gaspar de Guzmán, Count-Duke of Olivares, Spanish statesman (b. 1587)
- July 23 – Tsar Michael I of Russia (b. 1596)
- August 6 – Lionel Cranfield, 1st Earl of Middlesex, English merchant (b. 1575)
- August 18 – Eudoxia Streshneva, Tsaritsa of Russia (b. 1608)
- August 28 – Hugo Grotius, Dutch philosopher and writer (b. 1583)
- August 31 – Francesco Bracciolini, Italian poet (b. 1566)
- September 8 – Francisco de Quevedo, Spanish writer (b. 1580)
- September 11 – Nikolaus, Count Esterházy, Hungarian noble (b. 1583)
- September 14 – Sir Richard Grosvenor, 1st Baronet, English politician (b. 1585)
- September 16 – John Macias, Spanish Dominican friar and saint (b. 1585)
- October 2 – Francesco Cennini de' Salamandri, Italian Catholic cardinal (b. 1566)
- November 21 – William Helyar, English chaplain (b. 1559)
- December 7 – Philip Dietrich, Count of Waldeck-Eisenberg (1640–1645) (b. 1614)
- December 12 – Giovanni Bernardino Azzolini or Mazzolini or Asoleni, Italian painter (b. c. 1572)
- December 17 – Nur Jahan, empress consort of the Mughal Empire (b. 1577)
- December 28 – Gaspar de Borja y Velasco, Spanish Catholic cardinal (b. 1580)
- date unknown
  - Françoise-Marie Jacquelin, Acadian heroine (b. 1621)
  - William Lithgow, Scottish traveller (b. c. 1585)
  - Sultan Agung, third Sultan of Mataram (b. 1593)
