= Ataman =

Cossack and haydamak leadership title

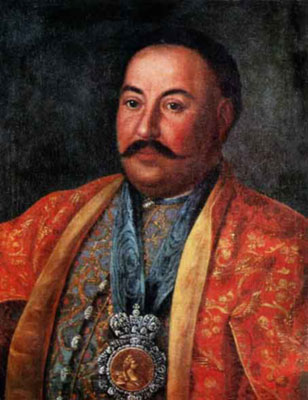
Ivan Matveevich Krasnoshchekov, Ataman of the Don Cossacks. Portrait is from 1761. The term Ataman is a theme of various Russian folk songs (Watch Russian folk song where Ataman is the theme of the song on YouTube)

Ataman (variants: otaman, wataman, vataman; Russian: атаман, romanized: ataman; Ukrainian: отаман, romanized: otaman, German: Feldataman) was a title of Cossack and haidamak leaders of various kinds. In the Russian Empire, the term was the official title of the supreme military commanders of the Cossack armies. The Ukrainian version of the same word is hetman. Otaman in Ukrainian Cossack forces was a position of a lower rank.

== Etymology ==
The etymologies of the words ataman and hetman are disputed. There may be several independent Germanic and Turkic origins for seemingly cognate forms of the words, all referring to the same concept. The hetman form cognates with German Hauptmann ('captain', literally 'head-man') by the way of Czech or Polish, like several other titles. The Russian term ataman is probably connected to Old East Slavic vatamanŭ, and cognates with Turkic odoman (Ottoman Turks). The term ataman may have also had a lingual interaction with Polish hetman and German hauptmann.

Suggestions have been made that the word might be of Turkic origin, literally meaning 'father of horsemen' or 'father of men', 'pure blooded father,' or 'eldest man,' considering the '-man' suffix in turkic languages means men, person, pure-blooded, or most. Dictionaries assert that the word comes from the German word 'Hauptmann' which means 'head man', 'headman' or 'chieftain', which entered the Russian language through Polish 'hetman'.

== Otaman in Ukraine ==
Otamans were usually elected by the Host Council or could have been appointed, especially during the military campaigns. The appointed otamans were called 'acting otaman' (наказний отаман, nakaznyi otaman).

In the Cossack Hetmanate, leaders of non-Cossack military units (artillery, etc.) were also called otamans. In the Cossack Hetmanate, the title was used for the administrative purposes, such as the head of the city, City Otaman (городовий отаман). Later such administrative uses were adopted by the Kuban Cossacks and were common in Kuban Oblast with different variations.

There were various types of otaman:

- Army otaman (військовий отаман), an executive officer in the Zaporizhian Host
- Campaign otaman (похідний отаман)
- Kish otaman (кошовий отаман)
- Kurin otaman (курінний отаман), a commander of a kurin;
- Sotennyi otoman (сотенний отаман) and city otaman (городовий Отаман) were the sotnyk's lieutenants. Those titles were introduced during the Hetmanate in the 17th century. Together with the osaul (осавул, 'aide-de-camp') and chorąży (хорунжий, 'flag-bearer'), this otoman helped the sotnyk in administrative affairs.
- Village otaman (сільський отаман), an administrative rank in the 17th to 18th centuries
- Okruh otaman (окружний отаман), a territorial leader
- Stanytsia otaman (станичний отаман), a territorial leader
- Khutir otaman (хутірський отаман), a territorial leader

Otamans were also in charge of general- and regimental-size artillery units, as well as any volunteer military formations and the Zholdak cavalry.

=== Campaign otamans ===
- Ivan Svirhovsky (1567–1574), leader of a Cossack detachment, regarded as one of the first Cossack hetmans in certain Cossack chronicles.
- Ivan Pidkova, campaign otaman of the unregistered Zaporizhian Cossacks (1577–1578), who was briefly proclaimed hospodar of Moldavia (November–December 1577).
- Bohdan Mykoshynsky, twice elected Hetman of the unregistered Zaporizhian Cossacks (1586, 1594) in conflicts with the Crimean Khanate.
- Kryshtof Kosynsky (1591–1593), otaman led the 1590 uprising after Janusz Ostrogski confiscated his lands near Bila Tserkva that were awarded to him by the Sejm
- Severyn Nalyvaiko (1596), an Ostrogski recruit who fought against the Kosiński Uprising, led his own uprising in Podolia and Volhynia independent from Hryhory Loboda. Elected Hetman of the rebel unregistered Cossacks in Pereiaslav in April 1596.
- Krempski, Hetman of Zaporizhia, was elected during the siege near Lubny and later managed to escape with a small number of other Cossacks. (Note: Lubny massacre, a massacre that was conducted by the Polish army led by Hetman Zolkiewski. After that battle the Cossack movement was greatly reduced within the Polish–Lithuanian Commonwealth.)
- Ivan Nechay, acting hetman of the Belarusian regiment (1656–9) after Ivan Zolotarenko's death.

== 20th century to present ==
Atamans were the titles of supreme leaders of various Cossack and peasant armies during the Russian Civil War.

When Ukraine acquired its independence in 1918, the rank took on different value. Among the Sich Riflemen and the Ukrainian Galician Army, it was equivalent to a major, as is the battalion executive officer today. In the Ukrainian People's Republic, the title was of a general rank. Chief Otaman (головний отаман) was the general of the Ukrainian Army who was assisted by his deputies, Acting Otamans.

The head of the army of the Ukrainian People's Republic, in particular, Symon Petliura, was called Supreme Otaman (головний отаман).

== See also ==
- Harambaša
- Voivode
