= Kosiński uprising =

- Part of Cossack uprisings
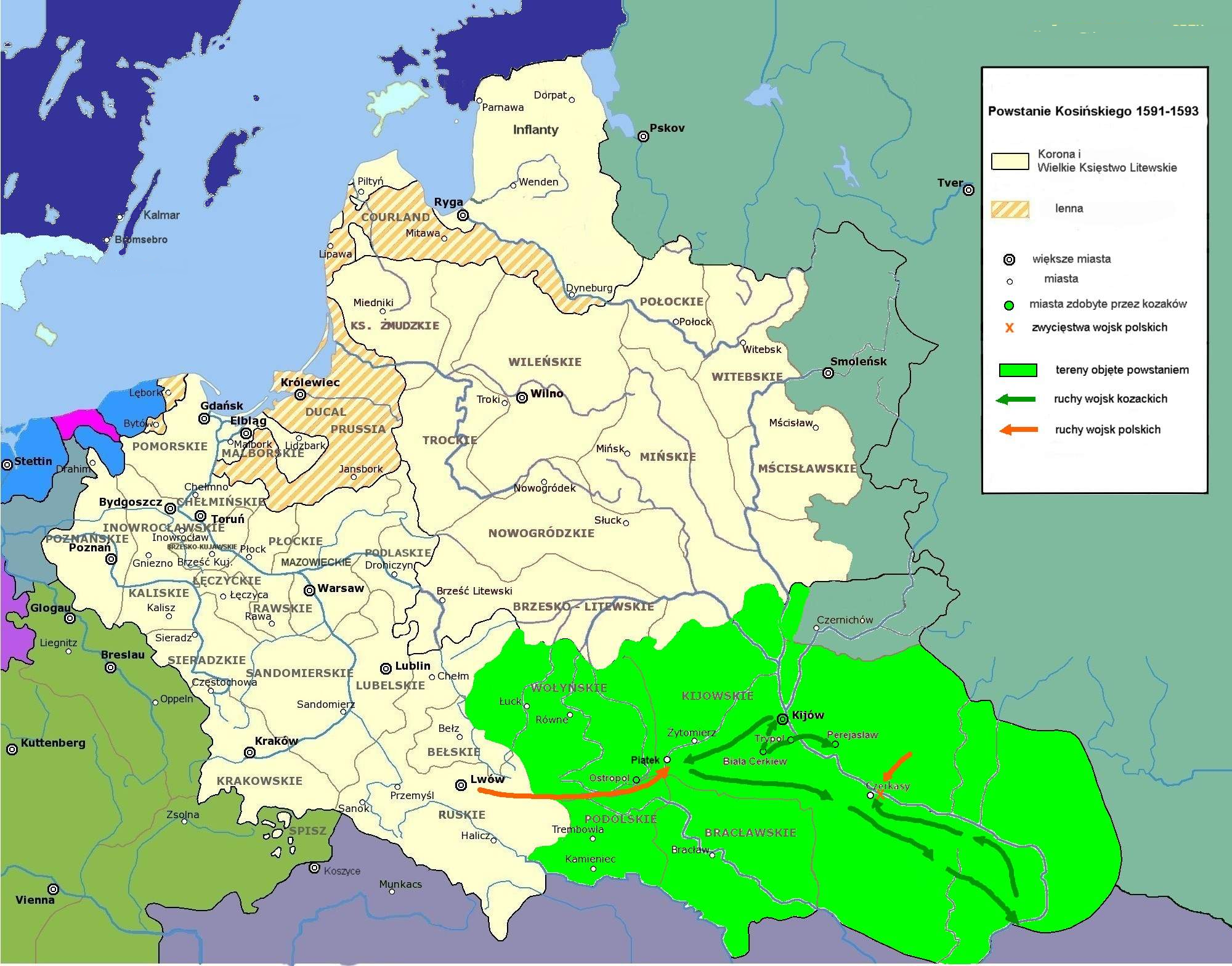
- Kosiński Uprising
Date	1591–1593
Location	Polish-Lithuanian Commonwealth
Result	Polish-Lithuanian victory

Belligerents
Polish-Lithuanian Commonwealth	Zaporozhian Cossacks

Commanders and leaders
Janusz Ostrogski; Aleksander Wiśniowiecki	Krzysztof Kosiński †

Kosiński uprising (1591–1593) was the first Cossack rebellion in the Polish–Lithuanian Commonwealth, commanded by the Cossack Hetman Krzysztof Kosiński.

== Prelude ==
In the late 16th century, the Polish–Lithuanian Commonwealth was experiencing a short period of internal stability. This, however, was threatened by the Cossacks, who organised raids into Crimea, Moldavia, and other lands of the Ottoman Empire. To counter the threat, Sultan Murad III threatened Poland–Lithuania with war if the Cossack pillaging continued.

In 1580 the Sejm in Warsaw passed the Order in Ukraine (Porządek ze strony Niżowców i Ukrainy) Act, in which Registered Cossacks were banned from raids to the Zaporizhian Sich, taking captives or pillaging. Any Cossack who broke this law was to be put to death without trial.

== The uprising ==
The immediate cause of the uprising was a dispute between the Cossack hetman Krzysztof Kosiński and the starosta of Bila Tserkva and Voivode of Volyn, Janusz Ostrogski. Kosinski, a nobleman from Podlasie, received lands in the Rokitno area, abandoned after the Crimean Tartar invasions, from Hetman Jan Zamoyski in 1590. However, these lands were taken over by Aleksander Wiśniowiecki and later ceded to Janusz Ostrogski. Feeling wronged, Kosinski attacked Bila Tserkva in December 1591, which sparked an uprising. On 29 December 1591, Kosinski attacked the house of Dmitry Kurtsevich Buliga in Bila Tserkva, stealing valuables and land grant documents. He then attacked Bohuslav, Tripoli and Pereyaslav, spreading the conflict to Kievshchyna, Braclawshchyna and Volhynia. King Sigismund III Vasa appointed a commission to put down the rebellion, headed by Mikołaj Jazłowiecki. In 1592, after unsuccessful negotiations, Kosinski continued fighting, destroying Ostrogski's estates. The final battle took place on 2 February 1593 at Piatek, where Kosinski's army was defeated by Janusz Ostrogski. After the surrender, The self-proclaimed hetman did not keep the terms of capitulation and fled to Zaporizhia, where he gathered a 2,000-strong detachment of Cossacks. He established contacts with Russia and Tatars, seeking support against the Commonwealth everywhere .But in May 1593 he was finally defeated at Cherkasy by Alexander Wisniowiecki and died in unclear circumstances. The 1593 Sejm declared the participants in the uprising to be traitors, but a settlement was later reached that allowed the registered Cossacks to keep their weapons and Chaika, declaring a general amnesty.

== See also ==
- Battle of Piatka
- Nalyvaiko Uprising
- Polish–Lithuanian Commonwealth

== Bibliography ==
- Serdczyk, Władysław (1984). Na dalekiej Ukrainie: Dzieje Kozaczyzny do 1648 roku [In distant Ukraine: The history of the Cossacks until 1648] (in Polish). Kraków: Wydawnictwo Literackie. ISBN 83-08-01214-0.
