= Lazzaro Grimaldi Cebà =

Doge of the Republic of Genoa and king of Corsica

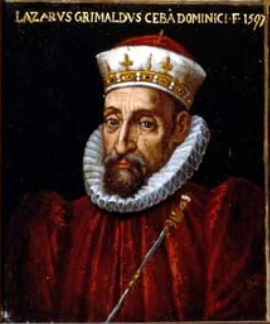

81st Doge of the Republic of Genoa
- In office December 7, 1597 – February 15, 1599
- Preceded by: Matteo Senarega
- Succeeded by: Lorenzo Sauli

Personal details
- Born: 1520 Genoa, Republic of Genoa
- Died: 1599 (aged 78–79) Genoa, Republic of Genoa

Lazzaro Grimaldi Cebà (Genoa, 1520 - Genoa, February 16, 1599) was the 81st Doge of the Republic of Genoa.

== Biography ==
Grimaldi Cebà was elected to the dogal title on December 7, 1597, the thirty-sixth in biennial succession and the eighty-first in republican history, despite a difficult election due to the clashes of the two main parties led by Ambrogio Spinola and Cosimo Centurione, his supporters at the appointment, with the other noble front led by the powerful Giovanni Andrea Doria. The fatigue caused by the events of his new office as Doge undermined the Grimaldi's already precarious health, so much so that, after a few days in bed, he died of a subsequent stroke attack on September 16, 1599. His Dogate stopped, therefore, ten months before the natural expiry of the mandate.

== See also ==
- Republic of Genoa
- Doge of Genoa
- House of Grimaldi
