= Nicolas Lemery =

French chemist (1645–1715)

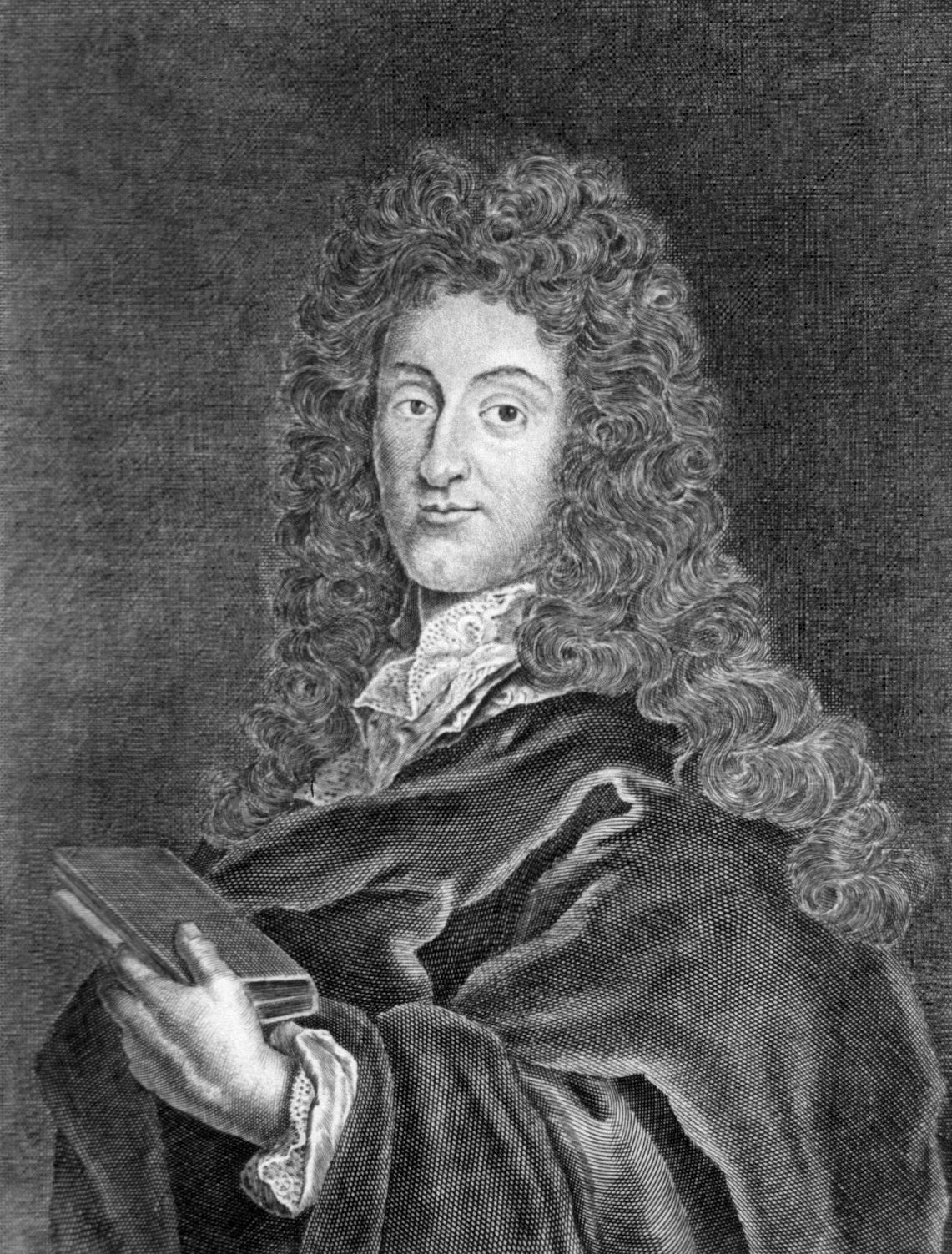
- Born: 17 November 1645; Rouen, France
- Died: 19 June 1715 (aged 69); Paris, France
- Known for: Acid-base bonding model
- Scientific career
- Fields: Chemistry

Nicolas Lémery (or Lemery as his name appeared in his international publications) (17 November 1645 – 19 June 1715), French chemist, was born at Rouen, Province of Normandy. He was one of the first to develop theories on acid-base chemistry.

== Life ==
After learning pharmacy in his native town he became a pupil of Christophe Glaser in Paris, and then went to Montpellier, where he began to lecture on chemistry. He next established a pharmacy in Paris, still continuing his lectures, but following 1683, being a Calvinist, he was obliged to retire to England. In the following year he returned to France, and turning Catholic in 1686 was able to reopen his shop and resume his lectures. He died in Paris on 19 June 1715.

Lemery did not concern himself much with theoretical speculations, but holding chemistry to be a demonstrative science, confined himself to the straightforward exposition of facts and experiments. In consequence, his lecture-room was thronged with people of all sorts, anxious to hear a man who shunned the barren obscurities of the alchemists, and did not regard the quest of the philosopher's stone and the elixir of life as the sole end of his science. Of his Cours de chymie (1675) he lived to see 13 editions, and for a century it maintained its reputation as a standard work.

In 1680, using the corpuscular theory as a basis, Lemery stipulated that the acidity of any substance consisted in its pointed particles, while alkalis were endowed with pores of various sizes. A molecule, according to this view, consisted of corpuscles united through a geometric locking of points and pores.

Mock-up of Nicolas Lemery's 1680 acid-base bonding model.

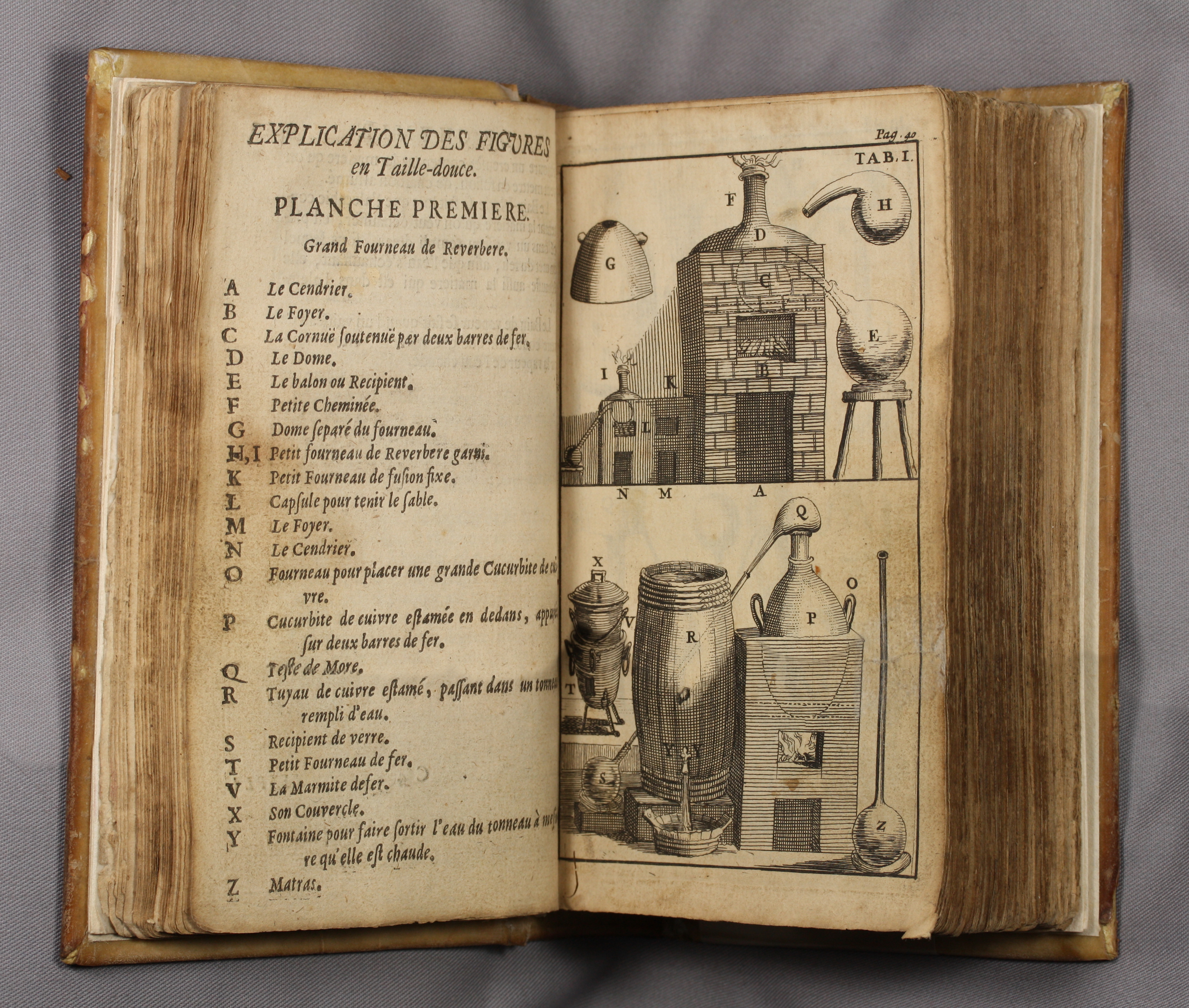
Illustration of laboratory apparatus, Cours de chymie, 1683

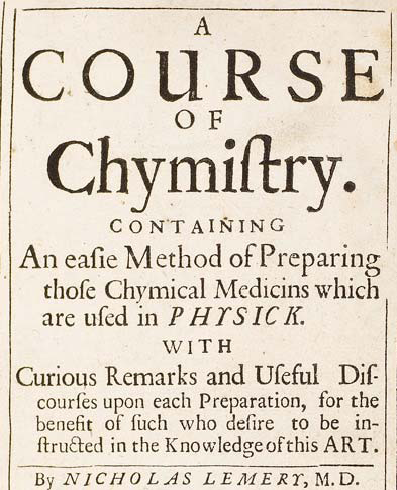
Cours de chymie in English

His other publications included Pharmacopée universelle (1697), Traité universel des drogues simples (1698), Traité de l'antimoine (1707), together with a number of papers contributed to the French Academy, one of which offered a chemical and physical explanation of underground fires, earthquakes, lightning and thunder. He discovered that heat is evolved when iron filings and sulfur are rubbed together to a paste with water, and the artificial volcan de Lemery was produced by burying underground a considerable quantity of this mixture, which he regarded as a potent agent in the causation of volcanic action.

His son Louis Lémery (1677–1743) was appointed physician at the Hôtel-Dieu de Paris in 1710, and became demonstrator of chemistry at the Jardin du Roi in 1731. He was the author of a Traité des aliments (1702), and of a Dissertation sur la nature des os (1704), as well as of a number of papers on chemical topics.

== Works ==
- Cours de chymie : contenant la maniere de faire les operations qui sont en usage dans la medecine, par un methode facile; avec des raisonnements sur chaque operation, pour l'instruction de ceux qui veulent s'appliquer a cette science. - 6. ed. - Paris : Michallet, 1687. Digital edition /1730 Digital 11th edition / 1744 Digital edition of the University and State Library Düsseldorf.
- Het philosoophze laboratorium, oft' der chymisten stook-huis. - Amsterdam : ten Hoorn, 1691. Digital edition of the University and State Library Düsseldorf.
- Nouveau recueil de[s] curiositez, les plus rares & admirables de tous les effects, que l'art & la nature sont capables de produire. Volume 1–2. Dernière édition augmentée, corrigée & enrichie de tailles-douces. Leyde : van der Aa, 1688. Digital edition of the University and State Library Düsseldorf
- Nouveau recueil de[s] secrets et curiositez, les plus rares & admirables de tous les effects, que l'art & la nature sont capables de produire. - 5. ed. - Amsterdam : Mortier, 1697. Digital edition of the University and State Library Düsseldorf.
  - 1
  - 2
- A course of chymistry : containing an easie method of preparing those chymical medicins which are used in physick; with curious remarks and useful discourses upon each preparation, for the benefit of such a desire to be instructed in the knowledge of this art. - The 3rd. ed., transl. from the 8th ed. in the French. - London : Kettilby, 1698. Digital edition of the University and State Library Düsseldorf.
- Cours de chymie, oder der vollkommene Chymist : welcher die in der Medicin gebräuchlichen chymischen Processe auff die leichteste und heilsamste Art machen lernt... Aus der 9. frantzösischen Edition des 1697sten Jahres ins Teutsche übersetzet. Winckler, Dresden 1698 Digital edition of the University and State Library Düsseldorf.
- A compleat history of druggs : written in French by Monsieur Pomet, chief druggist to the present French king; to which is added what is further observable on the same subject, from Messrs. Lemery and Tournefort, divided into 3 classes, vegetable, animal and mineral, with their use in physick, chymistry, pharmacy and several other arts; done into English from the originals. London, 1712.Digital edition of the University and State Library Düsseldorf.
- Farmacopea universale che contiene tutte le composizioni di farmacia le qualisono in uso nella medicina : tanto in Francia, quanto per tutta l'europa, ... e di piu un vocabolario farmaceutico, molte nuove osservazioni, ed alcuni ragionamenti sopra ogni operazione. Venezia : Gio. Gabriel Hertz, 1720 Digital edition of the University and State Library Düsseldorf.
- Dictionaire, ou traité universel des drogues simples ou l’on trouve leurs differens noms, leur origine, leur choix, les principes qu’elles renferment, leurs qualitez, leur etymologie, & tout ce qu’il ya de particulier dans les animaux, dans les vegetaux, & dans les mineraux; ouvrage dependant de la Pharmacopee universelle . Hofhout, Rotterdam 4.ed. 1727 Digital edition of the University and State Library Düsseldorf.
- Pharmacopée universelle : contenant toutes les compositions de pharmacie qui sont en usage dans la medicine, tant en France que par toute l'Europe, leurs vertus, leurs doses, les manieres d'operer les plus simples & les meilleures; avec un lexicon pharmaceutique, plusieurs remarques nouvelles, et des raisonnemens sur chaque operation. d’Houry, Paris 3.ed. 1728 Digital edition of the University and State Library Düsseldorf.

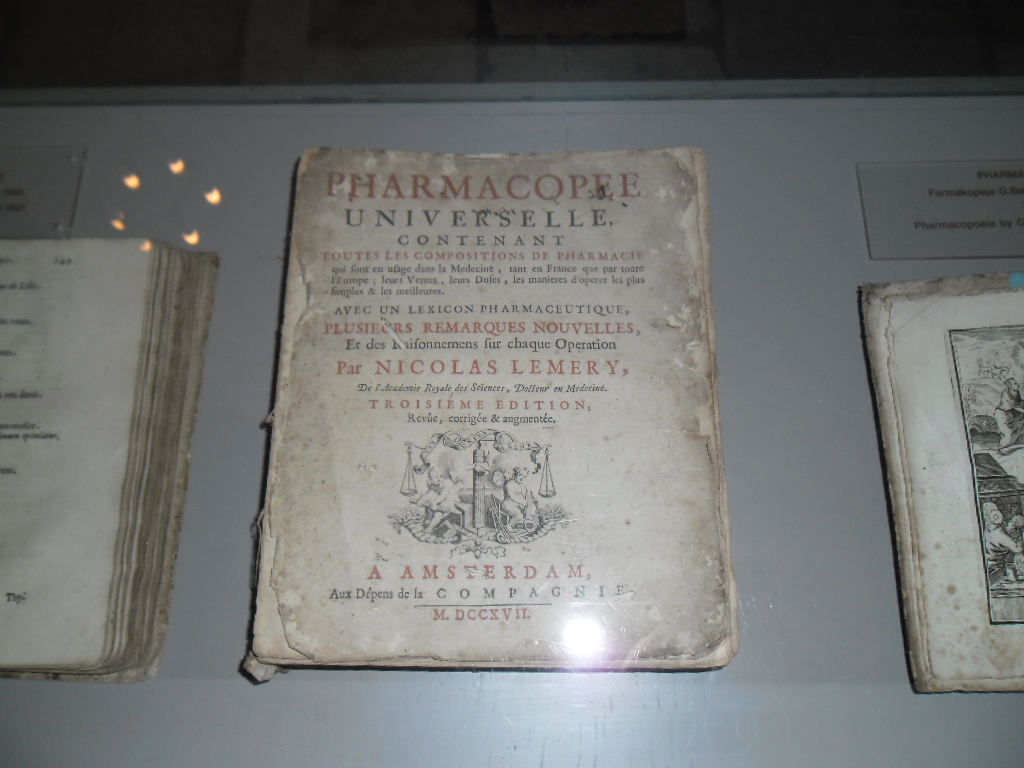
Pharmacopée universelle

- Cours de chymie : contenant la maniere de faire les operations qui sont en usage dans la medecine, par un methode facile; avec des raisonnemens sur chaque operation, pour l'instruction de ceux qui veulent s'appliquer a cette science. - 11. ed. - Paris : Delespine, 1730. Digital edition of the University and State Library Düsseldorf.
- Traité universel des drogues simples : mises en ordre alphabetique, ou l'on trouve leurs differens noms, leur origine, leur choix, les principes qu'elles renferment, leurs qualitez, leur etimologie, & tout ce qu'il ya de particulier dans les animaux, dans les vegetaux, & dans les mineraux; ouvrage dependant de la Pharmacopee universelle. d’Houry, Paris 4.ed. 1732 Digital edition of the University and State Library Düsseldorf.
- Cours de chymie : contenant la maniere de faire les operations qui sont en usage dans la medecine, par un methode facile; avec des raisonnemens sur chaque operation, pour l'instruction de ceux qui veulent s'appliquer a cette science. - Bruxelles : Leonard, 1744. Digital edition of the University and State Library Düsseldorf.
- Nicolai Lemeri cursus chymicus, oder vollkommener Chymist : welcher die in der Medicin vorkommenden chymischen Praeparata und Processus auf die vernünfftigste, leichteste und sicherste Art zu verfertigen lehret; aus dem Frantzösischen übersetzet. - ... Bey dieser 5. Aufl. aufs neue durchgesehen, corrigirt und vermehret von Johann Christian Zimmermann. - Dresden : Walther, 1754. Digital edition of the University and State Library Düsseldorf.

== See also ==
- Timeline of hydrogen technologies

== Sources ==
- Lafont, Olivier (2002). "[Nicolas Lémery and acidity]". Revue d'histoire de la pharmacie. 50 (333). France: 53–62. doi:10.3406/pharm.2002.5323. ISSN 0035-2349. PMID 12141323.
- Powers, J C (November 1998). "Ars sine arte: Nicholas Lemery and the end of alchemy in eighteenth-century France". Ambix. 45 (3). ENGLAND: 163–89. doi:10.1179/amb.1998.45.3.163. ISSN 0002-6980. PMID 11623669.
- Sousa Dias, J P; Rocha Pita J R (1994). "[The influence of French pharmacy and chemistry in Portugal in the 18th century: Nicolas Lémery]". Revue d'histoire de la pharmacie. 41 (300). FRANCE: 84–90. doi:10.3406/pharm.1994.3826. ISSN 0035-2349. PMID 11640292.
