= Matteo Senarega =

Doge of the Republic of Genoa

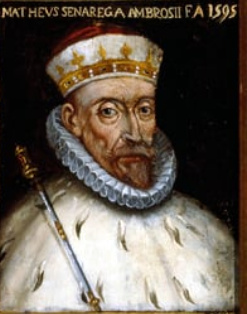

80th Doge of the Republic of Genoa
- In office December 5, 1595 – December 4, 1597
- Preceded by: Antonio Grimaldi Cebà
- Succeeded by: Lazzaro Grimaldi Cebà

Personal details
- Born: 1534 Genoa, Republic of Genoa
- Died: 1606 (aged 71–72) Genoa, Republic of Genoa

Matteo Senarega (1534 – 21 December 1606 in Genoa) was the 80th Doge of the Republic of Genoa.

== Biography ==
Senarega was elected to the dogal title on December 5, 1595, the thirty-fifth in biennial succession and the eightieth in republican history. During his mandate, the expulsion of Jews from the Genoese republic and his personal fight against the corruption of Criminal judgments in administering justice are remembered. He held the office until December 4, 1597. At the end of the dogate he was appointed perpetual procurator, a post due to all the former-doges, and he still had important government and representation duties.

An ancestor of his family, Bartolomeo Senarega (died 1514), was a Genovese diplomat who wrote a chronicle of the history of Genoa 1433-1514.

== See also ==
- Republic of Genoa
- Doge of Genoa
