= August Kühnel =

August Kühnel (3 August 1645 – ca. 1700) was a German composer and accomplished viola da gamba performer.

== Biography ==
Kühnel was the son of the Mecklenburg chamber musician Samuel Kühnel. Already in 1661 (at age 16), after receiving education in Güstrow and France, he was appointed Violdigambist in the court orchestra of Maurice, Duke of Saxe-Zeitz, a position he held until 1681. After the duke's death in 1682, Kühnel went to England to study. In 1686, he was appointed director of instrumental music at the Darmstadt court by Countess Elisabeth Dorothea von Sachsen-Coburg where he remained until 1688. After jobs in Weimar and Dresden, he found his last job in 1695 at the court of Charles I, Landgrave of Hesse-Kassel.

Kühnel's main instrument was the viola da gamba for which he also wrote numerous compositions. In 1698, his first collection of trio sonatas for viola da gamba was published as 14 Sonate ò Partite ad una o due viole da gamba, con il basso continuo and printed in Kassel. This collection includes 6 sonatas for two gambas and 8 sonatas for one gamba. This was the first printing of German trio sonatas in Germany.
