= Giovanni Agostino Giustiniani Campi =

Doge of the Republic of Genoa

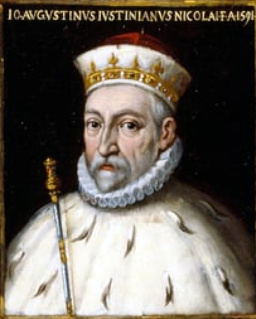

78th Doge of the Republic of Genoa
- In office November 27, 1591 – November 26, 1593
- Preceded by: Battista Negrone
- Succeeded by: Antonio Grimaldi Cebà

Personal details
- Born: 1538 Genoa, Republic of Genoa
- Died: 1613 (aged 74–75) Genoa, Republic of Genoa

Giovanni Agostino Giustiniani Campi (Genoa, 1538 - Genoa, 1613) was the 78th Doge of the Republic of Genoa.

== Biography ==
His election as doge on November 27, 1591, according to the Genoese annals, was not somewhat shared among the representatives of the Grand Council so much so that the new doge Giovanni Agostino Giustiniani Campi was elected with a low number of votes in his favor. After the end of his mandate, Giustiniani Campi still held various state positions until his death in Genoa in 1613.

== See also ==
- Republic of Genoa
- Doge of Genoa

== Sources ==
- Buonadonna, Sergio. Rosso doge. I dogi della Repubblica di Genova dal 1339 al 1797.
