= Liborius Wagner =

Blessed Liborius Wagner
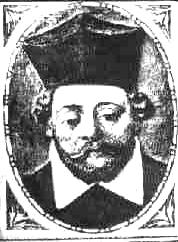

Priest
- Born: 5 December 1593; Mühlhausen, Holy Roman Empire
- Died: 9 December 1631 (aged 38); Schonungen, Prince-Bishopric of Würzburg, Holy Roman Empire
- Venerated in: Roman Catholic Church
- Beatified: 24 March 1974, Saint Peter's Basilica, Vatican City by Pope Paul VI
- Feast: 9 December
- Attributes: Cassock; Sword; Palm
- Patronage: Persecuted Christians

Liborius Wagner (5 December 1593 – 9 December 1631) was a German Roman Catholic priest. He administered throughout his pastoral mission in Würzburg and was killed "in odium fidei" (in hatred of the faith). He performed a wide range of charitable acts and he was more than willing to - at the time of his death - shed his blood for his beliefs and for his fellow Christians.

In recognition of his murder Pope Paul VI beatified him on 24 March 1974.

== Life ==
Liborius Wagner was born on 5 December 1593 to Lutheran Protestant parents.

He served as a scholar who grew up in a Protestant household during the Counter-Reformation period. His decision was - in 1613 - to study at the Jesuit Seminar in Würzburg and this was a decision that his parents disapproved of. He became firm in faith as a Catholic - he had converted during this time and earned the ire of his parents - and continued his studies for the priesthood. He became a teacher in 1617 and was ordained as a priest on 29 March 1625. He became the pastor to an area split between Protestants and Catholics. He attempted to reconcile both as best as he could but the divisions ran far too deep for him to do this.

Wagner was driven from his parish to another town during a time of conflict in Central Europe. Protestant soldiers apprehended him in a schoolhouse and tortured him for almost a week. He refused to renounce his faith and they killed him on 9 December 1631: He was shot and his corpse stripped and thrown into a river; his corpse was recovered sometime later. He was buried and then exhumed and later transferred for the final time on 15 December 1637.

== Beatification ==
The cause for Wagner's beatification was formally opened on 18 October 1939, granting him the title of Servant of God. On 18 October 1973 he was recognized as one who died in hatred of the faith and it allowed for Pope Paul VI to celebrate his beatification on 24 March 1974. The pope hailed Wagner for his "testament to faith".
