= Revue d'Histoire de la Pharmacie =

Pharmacology journal

- Discipline: History of Medicine, Pharmacy
- Language: French

Publication details
- History: 1913-present
- Publisher: Societe D'Histoire de la Pharmacie (France)
- Frequency: quarterly

Standard abbreviations
- ISO 4: Rev. Hist. Pharm.

Indexing
- ISSN: 0035-2349

The Revue d'Histoire de la Pharmacie is a French academic journal founded in 1913. It covers the fields of the History of Medicine and pharmacy. It was previously known as the Bulletin de la Société d'Histoire de la Pharmacie.

== History ==
The journal was instrumental in the formation of pharmacy history as an academic discipline by providing a continuous institutional platform for research, defining core subject matter, fostering a professional scholarly community, and helping transition the field from an antiquarian study to a structured subdiscipline of the history of medicine.
