= Battle of Piatka =

1593 battle in Poland-Lithuania

- Part of Kosiński uprising
Date	February 2, 1593
Location	Piatka, in modern Zhytomyr Oblast, Ukraine
Result	Polish-Lithuanian victory

Belligerents
Polish–Lithuanian Commonwealth	insurgent Cossacks

Commanders and leaders
Janusz Ostrogski, Aleksander Wiśniowiecki	Krzysztof Kosiński

Strength
Pospolite ruszenie of the voivodships: Kiev, Bratslav, Volhynian, private troops of Prince Janusz Ostrogski	5,000 Cossacks, 26 cannons

Casualties and losses
Very light	3,000 killed, 26 cannons

Battle of Piatka or Battle of Piątek (Ukrainian: П'ятка, Polish: Piątka, Piątek), (February 2, 1593) took place during the Kosiński Uprising. Polish–Lithuanian Commonwealth forces under the command of Janusz Ostrogski defeated the Cossacks forces under the command of Krzysztof Kosiński.
