= Antonio Grimaldi Cebà =

Doge of the Republic of Genoa (1534–1599)

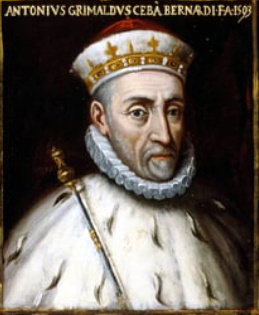

79th Doge of the Republic of Genoa
- In office November 27, 1593 – November 26, 1595
- Preceded by: Giovanni Agostino Giustiniani Campi
- Succeeded by: Matteo Senarega

Personal details
- Born: 1534 Genoa, Republic of Genoa
- Died: 1599 (aged 64–65) Genoa, Republic of Genoa

Antonio Grimaldi Cebà (1534–1599) was the 79th Doge of the Republic of Genoa.

== Biography ==
In political and territorial management, the mandate of Doge Antonio Grimaldi Cebà was marked by the start of new negotiations for the purchase of the territory of Sassello by the lord Giovanni Andrea Doria, grandson of the famous Genoese admiral Andrea Doria, who eventually "gave in" only in 1616 after the disbursement by the Genoese of 160 thousand florins. No less difficult was the acquisition of the Marquisate of Zuccarello due to the contrasts with the nearby Duchy of Savoy. After the two years, his Doge's mandate ended on November 26, 1595, Grimaldi was then appointed perpetual procurator; until his death he held other state offices. He died in Genoa in 1599.

== See also ==
- Republic of Genoa
- Doge of Genoa
- House of Grimaldi
