= Sixtinus Amama =

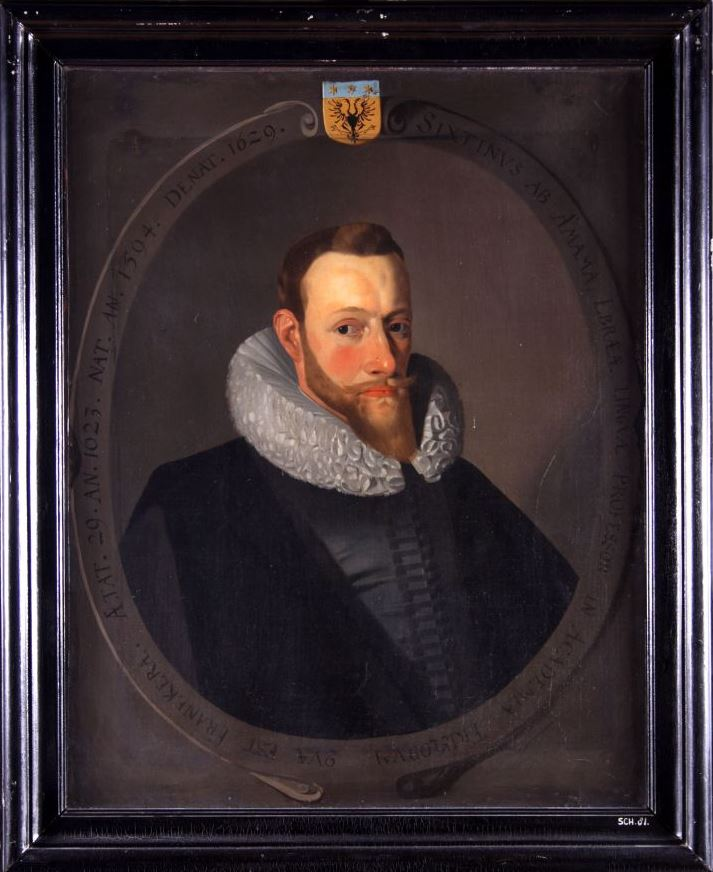
- Born: 13 October 1593; Franeker
- Died: 9 November 1629 (aged 36); Franeker
- Occupation: Reformed theologian orientalist
- Spouse: Meine van Adelen van Cronenburg

Sixtinus Amama (also Sextinus) (13 October 1593 – 9 November 1629) was a Dutch Reformed theologian and orientalist. Amama was among the first to advocate a thorough knowledge of the original languages of the Bible as indispensable to theologians.

== Life ==
He was born in Franeker, in the Dutch province of Friesland. He studied oriental languages from 1610 at the University of Franeker and then at the University of Oxford, attracted there by John Prideaux. In 1614 he took up also the study of Arabic at the University of Leyden where he made the acquaintance of Thomas Erpenius.

In 1616 he became professor of literature and oriental languages at Franeker. Subsequently, however, he was suspected of Arianism, and underwent an investigation by Sibrandus Lubbertus and Johannes Bogerman (1576-1637). Bogerman was a Calvinist theologian who was the Ecclesiastical President of the Synod of Dort (1618-1619). When Erpenius died in 1625, Amama was called to take his place, however the Estates of Friesland refused permission for him to leave, but did increase his remuneration.

He died in Franeker.

== Works ==
- Dissertatio, qua ostenditur praecipuos Papismi errores ex ignorantia Hebraismis ortum sumsisse (Franeker 1618)
- Censura vulgatae versionis quinque librorum Mosis (1620)
- Bybelsche conferentie, in welke de Nederl. overzetting beproeft wordt (Amsterdam 1623)
- Biblia in ’t Nederduitsch (Amsterdam 1625)
- Antibarbarus biblicus (1628)
- Hebreouwsch Woordenboek (1628)

== Family ==
He married Meine van Adelen van Cronenburg; the natural philosopher Nicolaus ab Amama (1628-1656) was their son.
