= Adam Christian Agricola =

Adam Christian Agricola (December 12, 1593, in Cieszyn – May 29, 1645, in Königsberg) was an evangelical preacher.

He was the son of Johannes Agricola. Adam Christian learned in Cieszyn and Wrocław. Since 1612 he studied in Leipzig. In 1616 he became a teacher in Cieszyn. In 1619 he became a doctor of philosophy on university in Frankfurt. In 1620 he became court preacher in Cieszyn, and he held the same position from 1622 in Mecklenburg and from 1636 in Königsberg. He wrote religious publications.
