= Krzysztof Kosiński =

Cossack noble

- Hetman
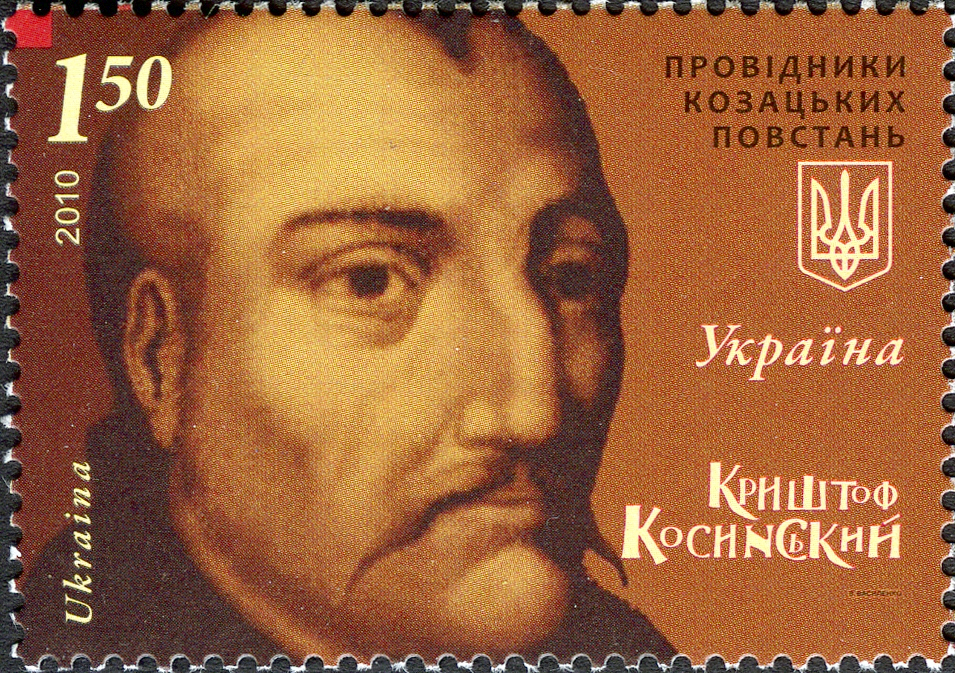
- Kosiński on a 2010 stamp of Ukraine
- Coat of arms: Rawicz
- Other names: Kryshtof Kosynsky
- Born: 1545
- Died: 1593 (aged 47–48)
- Occupation: Cossack noble

Krzysztof Kosiński, also known as Kryshtof Kosynsky (Ukrainian: Криштоф Косинський; 1545–1593), was a Polish-Cossack noble from the Podlachia region. He was a colonel of the Registered Cossacks and self-proclaimed hetman. He led two consecutive rebellions against the local Ruthenian nobility, known as the Kosiński uprising.

== Life ==
The Kosiński uprising (1591–1593) is a name applied to two rebellions in the eastern parts of the Polish–Lithuanian Commonwealth (modern-day Ukraine) organised by Krzysztof Kosiński against the local Ruthenian nobility and magnates.

His forces were first defeated by Duke Janusz Ostrogski in the Battle of Piątek on 2 February 1593. Kosiński promised to subject his forces to the Polish Monarchy; however, he soon escaped to Zaporizhzhia, where he began organizing a new army. In 1593, he set out for Cherkasy but was soon killed.

== See also ==
- Severyn Nalyvaiko
