= Mazeppa =

Mazepa or Mazeppa is the surname of Ivan Mazepa, a Ukrainian hetman made famous worldwide by a poem by Lord Byron. It may refer to:

== Artistic works ==
=== Poems ===
- "Mazeppa" (poem) (1819), a dramatic poem by Lord Byron
- "Mazeppa", a poem by Victor Hugo, part of the collection Les Orientales (1829)

=== Music, drama, film ===
- Mazeppa (1828), a piano work by Carl Loewe Op. 27
- Mazeppa (1862), a cantata by Michael W. Balfe to text by Jessica Rankin
- Mazeppa; or, The wild horse of Tartary, an 1831 hippodrama by Henry M. Milner
- Mazepa (drama) (1839), a drama by Juliusz Słowacki
- Mazeppa (1892), an opera by Clemence de Grandval
- Mazeppa (opera) (1884), an opera by Tchaikovsky
- Mazeppa (symphonic poem), an orchestral work by Franz Liszt
- Transcendental Étude No. 4 (Liszt), called Mazeppa, an étude for piano by Franz Liszt
- Mazeppa (1909 film), a Russian film
- Mazeppa (1993 film), a French film

== People ==
- Mazepa family, a Ruthenian/Ukrainian noble family
- Mazepa (surname)
- Gailard Sartain (born 1946), American actor occasionally known as Dr. Mazeppa Pompazoidi

=== Fictional characters ===
- Mazeppa, a character in the 1930 film The Blue Angel
- Mazeppa, a character in the 1959 musical Gypsy and its subsequent screen adaptations

== Places ==
=== United States ===
- Mazeppa, Minnesota
- Mazeppa, Pennsylvania
- Mazeppa Township, Wabasha County, Minnesota
- Mazeppa Township, Grant County, South Dakota

=== Elsewhere ===
- Mazeppa National Park, Australia
- Mazeppa, Alberta, Canada
- Mazeppa Bay, South Africa
- Mazepa, a neighborhood in Galați, Romania

== Other ==
- Ukrainian corvette Hetman Ivan Mazepa, a ship of the Ukrainian Navy
- A South Devon Railway Eagle class 4-4-0ST steam locomotive
