= Mazepa (surname) =

Mazepa (Ukrainian: Мазепа) is a Ukrainian surname. Notable people with this surname include:

- Halyna Mazepa (1910–1995), Ukrainian and Venezuelan artist
- Igor Mazepa (born 1976), Ukrainian investor
- Igor Mazepa (motorsport) (1973–2014), Russian racing manager
- Isaak Mazepa (1884–1952), Ukrainian politician
- Ivan Mazepa (1639–1709), Ukrainian leader
- James Mazepa (born 1941), American philatelist
- Katharina Mazepa (born 1995), Austrian model
- Marina Mazepa (born 1997), Ukrainian actress and dancer
