= Mazepa family =

Mazepa
- Kurcz coat of arms
- Current region: Ukraine
- Origin: Mazepyntsi
- Members: Ivan Mazepa; Fedir Mazepa

The Mazepa family (Ukrainian: Мазепа) was a noble Ruthenian family. Their origin can be traced back to 1544, when the Ruthenian szlachtych Mykola Mazepa-Koledynski was given a khutor (farmstead) Kamyanets (which later grew to become the village of Mazepyntsi) by King Sigismund I for his duty. The family bore the Kurcz coat of arms.

== Notable members ==
=== Mazepyntsi branch ===
- Mykola Mazepa-Koledynski (16th century)
- Fedir Mykhaylovych Mazepa, a Cossack otaman. He fought against the Poles together with Hryhory Loboda, Severyn Nalyvaiko & Krzysztof Kosiński. Later he was caught and together with Severyn Nalyvaiko was executed in Warsaw.
- Stepan-Adam Mazepa. His spouse Maryna Mazepa (died 1707), née Mokiyevska, became a nun and later hegumenia of the Frolov-Voznesenski Monastery in Kiev under the name Magdalena. They had a son, Ivan, and a daughter, who later married Andrew Voynarovsky.
- Ivan Mazepa (1639–1709), Hetman of Zaporizhian Host (1687–1709)
- Andriy Voynarovsky (1689-1740), nephew and heir of Ivan Mazepa, member of the Zaporozhian Army

=== Kostobobriv branch ===
- Isaak Mazepa (1884–1952), Prime minister of Ukraine
- Halyna Mazepa (1910-1995), Ukrainian painter, who later settled in Venezuela
- Anna Politkovskaya (1958–2006), Russian journalist
Notable members of the family

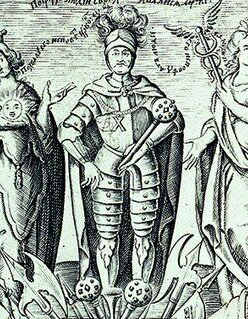
Ivan Mazepa

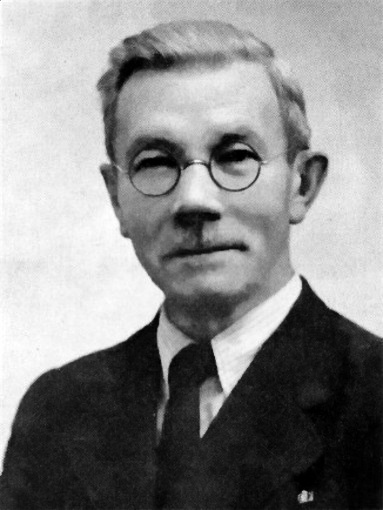
Isaak Mazepa, born in Kostobobriv

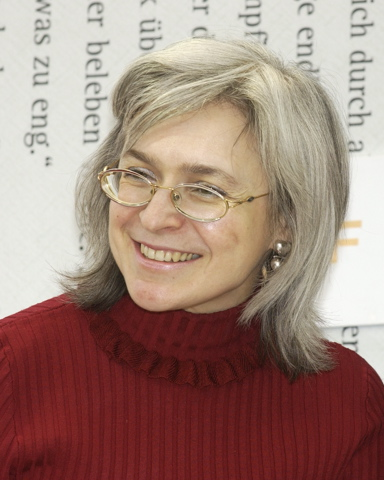
Anna Politkovskaya, née Mazepa
