= Le Fiamme di Zaporoze =

Le Fiamme di Zaporoze is an epic historical novel written in Italian about the Zaporozhian Cossacks at the time of Hetman Ivan Mazepa and Czar Peter the Great during the Great Northern War, by Mario Dimitrio Donadio and published in Italy by Giraldi Editore in 2008.
