= Mazepa and the Wolves =

Painting by Horace Vernet

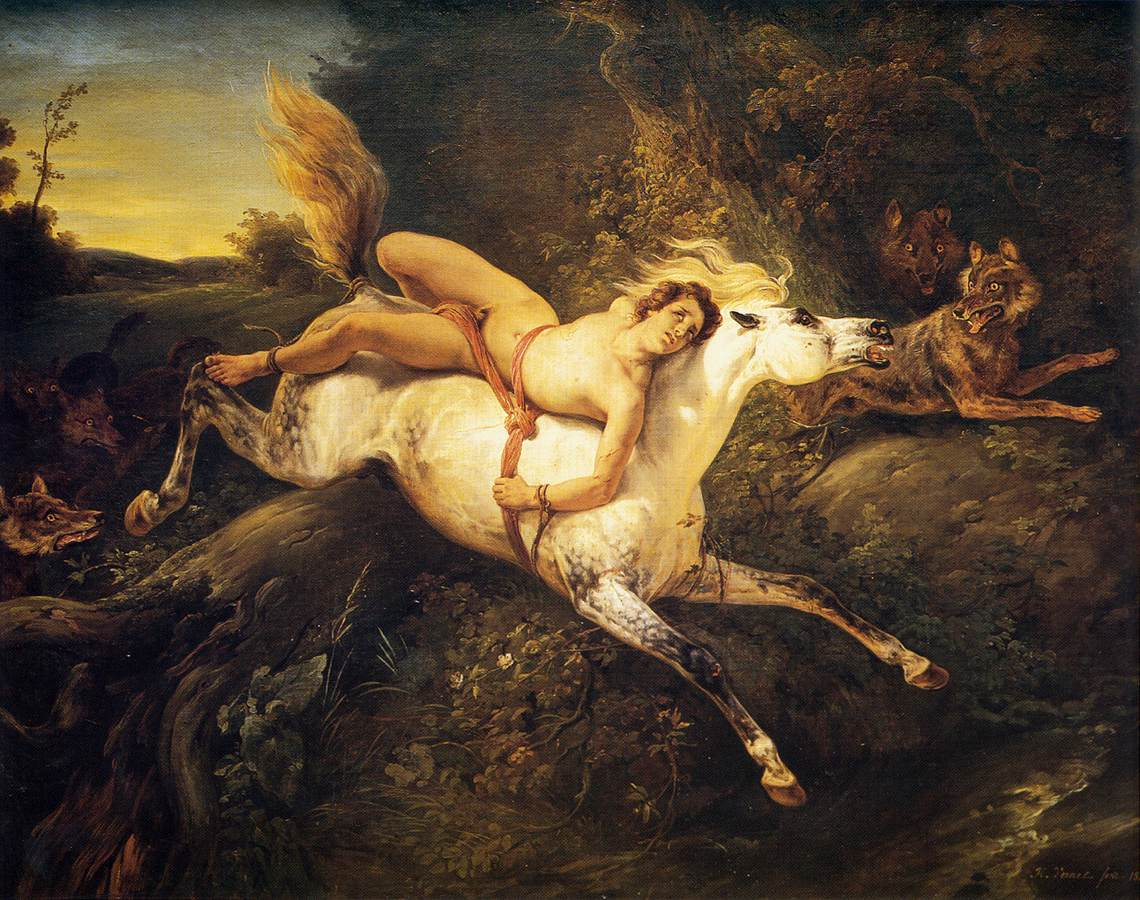
Mazepa and the Wolves (1826) by Horace Vernet

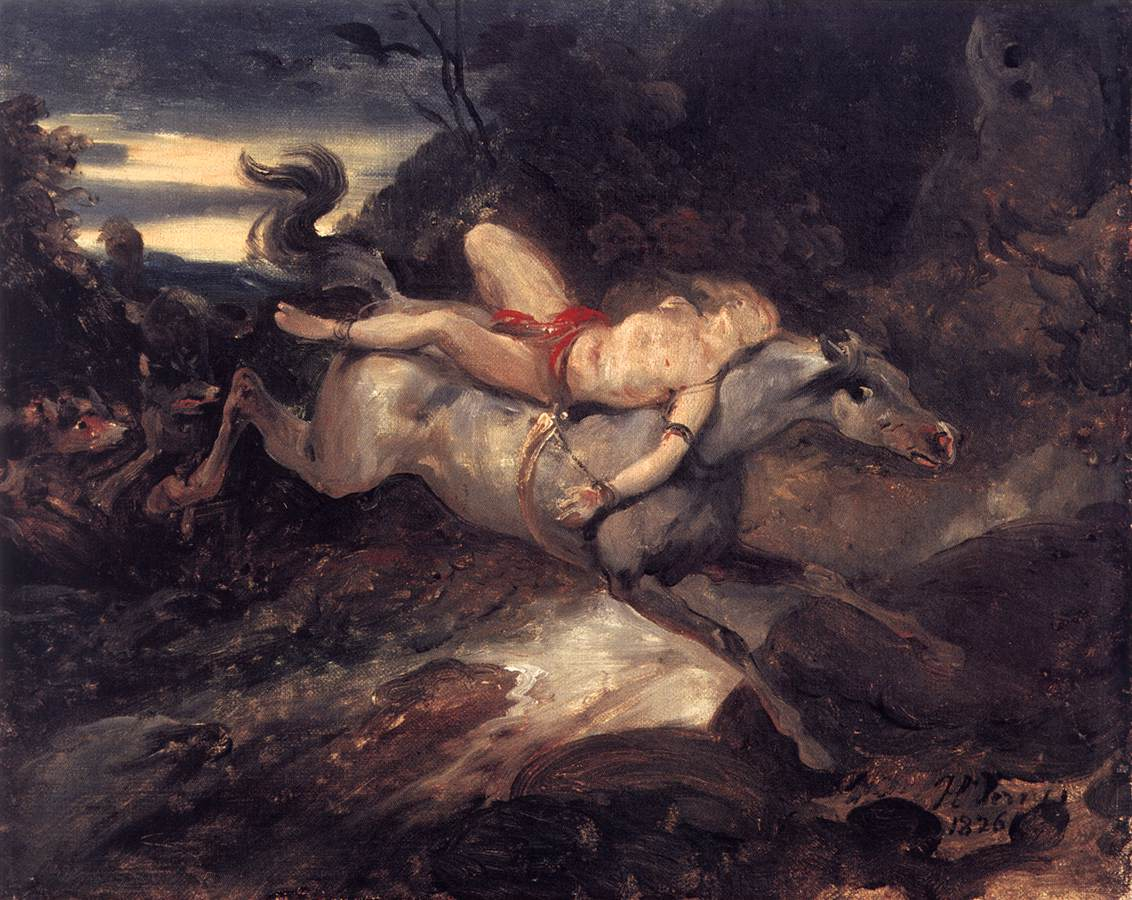
Preparatory oil sketch.

Mazepa and the Wolves (French: Mazeppa aux loups) is an oil on canvas painting by Horace Vernet, from 1826. It was acquired the same year by the Fondation Calvet and thus is now in the Musée Calvet, in Avignon. It was exhibited at the Paris Salon in 1827 and is inspired by the Ukrainian hetman Ivan Mazepa, shown on the back of a wild horse chased by wolves.

It is an autograph replica of an earlier version by Vernet dating to 1798, which was damaged by him in his studio whilst he was practising fencing.
