= Isaak Mazepa =

Ukrainian politician (1884–1952)

- Ісаак Мазепа
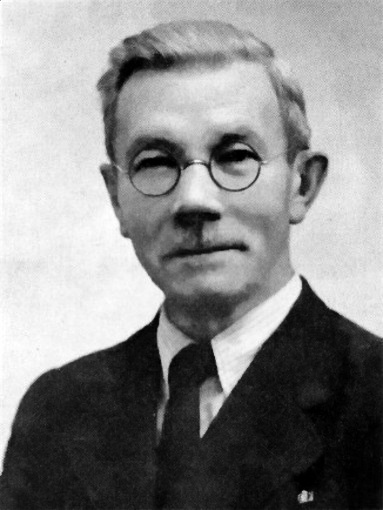

6th Chairman of the Council of People's Ministers of Ukraine
- In office 27 August 1919 – 26 May 1920
- Preceded by: Borys Martos
- Succeeded by: Vyacheslav Prokopovych

Personal details
- Born: Isaak Prokhorovych Mazepa; 16 August 1884 Kostobobriv, Novgorod-Seversky Uyezd, Chernigov Governorate, Russian Empire (now Novhorod-Siverskyi Raion, Chernihiv Oblast, Ukraine)
- Died: 18 March 1952 (aged 67) Augsburg, West Germany
- Party: USDRP (1905)
- Other political affiliations: RUP
- Spouse: Natalia Synhalevych-Mazepa
- Children: Halyna Mazepa-Koval
- Education: Saint Petersburg University (1910)
- Occupation: Politician/Scientist/Pedagogue

Isaak Mazepa
- Coat of arms: Kurcz Coat of Arms
- Noble family: Mazepa

Isaak Prokhorovych Mazepa (Ukrainian: Ісаак Прохорович Мазепа; 16 August 1884 – 18 March 1952) was a Ukrainian politician. He was the Head of the Government of Ukrainian People's Republic from August 1919 to May 1920, and one of the central figures of the 1917 Ukrainian revolution.

== Early life and education ==
Isaak Mazepa was born on 16 August 1884 in Kostobobriv village, Chernihiv province, Russian Empire. His father, Prokhor Mazepa, was a burgher of Cossack origin. He send his son to study at the Novgorod-Siversky Bursa, and later at the Chernihiv Theological Seminary, where Mazepa first got acquainted with the works of Karl Marx and Friedrich Engels, and received a reputation of a Social Democrat. However Mazepa did not want to become a priest and began to prepare for admission to the Faculty of Natural Sciences of St. Petersburg University. In 1904, he entered St. Petersburg University.

From 1905, Mazepa was a member of the Revolutionary Ukrainian Party, and from 1906 a member of the Ukrainian Social Democratic Labour Party (USDRP). As the most active member of the party, he was delegated to Kyiv in 1907 to participate in an illegal congress of the USDRP from the St. Petersburg organization. In 1910, Mazepa graduated from St. Petersburg University.

== Work ==
In 1911–1915, he worked as an agronomist in zemstvo institutions of the Nizhny Novgorod province. In 1915, Mazepa moved to Katerynoslav (now Dnipro, Ukraine) working in the provincial food committee. At the same time, he established contacts with the local illegal USDRP organization, which launched extensive anti-war propaganda.

== Revolutionary activity ==
After the February Revolution of 1917 in Russia Mazepa was a member of the Katerynoslav City Duma and the Katerynoslav Council of Workers 'and Peasants' Deputies, and in April 1918 he headed the Katerynoslav Provincial Revolutionary Council. In October 1918 he was arrested for editing a newspaper Nashe Slovo, but soon was released. In January 1919, Mazepa was a deputy of the Labor Congress of Ukraine, and from April 1919 he was the Minister of Internal Affairs of the Ukrainian People's Republic in the government of Borys Martos.

From August 27, 1919, to May 25, 1920, Mazepa was a Chairman of the Council of People's Ministers of the Ukrainian People's Republic. In May–June 1920, he was a Minister of Land Affairs of the UPR. He took part in the First Winter Campaign 1919-20 within the Winter Campaigns of the Army of the Ukrainian People's Republic in 1919-20 and 1921.

== In exile ==
From 1920 Mazepa lived in exile in Lviv, where he edited the USDRP newspaper The Free Ukraine and the magazine Socialist Thought.

In 1923, he moved to Czechoslovakia. From 1927 he was an associate professor at the Ukrainian Academy of Economics in Podebrady and worked at the Ukrainian Institute of Sociology. During the interwar period he was one of the leading figures of the USDRP Foreign Delegation. He defended Ukrainian interests at many social democratic conferences, was a member of the executive committee of the Labour and Socialist Internationals.

After the wife's death, Mazepa decided to move to Austria and Germany. From October 1946 he was a professor at the Ukrainian Technical and Economic Institute in Munich. In 1948, he was one of the co-organizers of the Ukrainian National Council in exile and was elected the first chairman of the Executive Body of the UN Council (until January 1952). In 1950 Mazepa became the founder of the Ukrainian Socialist Party.

Mazepa is the author of works/articles like Bolshevism and the Occupation of Ukraine (1922), The Foundations of Our Revival (1946).

Isaak Mazepa died on 18 March 1952 in Augsburg, Germany.

== Personal life ==
Being a student of St. Petersburg University Mazepa was acquainted with a student of the Medical Women's Institute Natalia Singalevich, also a member of the USDRP. Soon they got married, and in 1910 their daughter Halyna Mazepa was born. She became an artist. In 1945 Mazepa's wife Natalia Singalevich and two of their grandchildren tragically died during a raid on Prague by American aircraft.

== Works (selected) ==
- Bolshevism and the occupation of Ukraine, Lviv, 1922. - 156 p.
- The created state (the struggle of 1919), Collection of memory of Symon Petliura (1879-1926), Prague, 1930. - P. 16–76.
- From my St. Petersburg memories, Dnipro, 1938. - P. 17-25
- Foundations of our revival, New Ulm: ed. Prometheus, 1946
- Ukraine in the fire and storm of the revolution of 1917–1921 .- Vol. I: Central Council - Hetmanate, Directory. Prague: "Breakthrough", 1942; New Ulm: "Prometheus", 1950-210 p.
