= Andriy Voynarovsky =

Andriy Ivanovych Voynarovsky (Ukrainian: Андрій Іванович Войнаровський, 1689 - 1740 or 1742) was an officer of the Cossack Hetmanate, a member of Cossack starshyna and a nephew of Hetman Ivan Mazepa.

== Biography ==
Andriy was the son of the nobleman Jan Voynarovsky from his second marriage to Oleksandra Mazepa, the sister of Hetman Ivan Mazepa. He was brought up at the hetman's court of his uncle. He studied at the Kyiv-Mohyla Collegium and the University of Dresden (Saxony) and spent some time at the court of King Augustus II the Strong.

Voynarovsky served as a captain of the Zaporozhian Army, owner of large estates in Left-bank Ukraine, trustee of the hetman and an active participant in his anti-Moscow actions. In 1708, with Mazepa and a group of officers, he sided with King Charles XII of Sweden. After the defeat of the Swedes in the Battle of Poltava in 1709, he emigrated to Bender (Principality of Moldova), and from there to Germany.

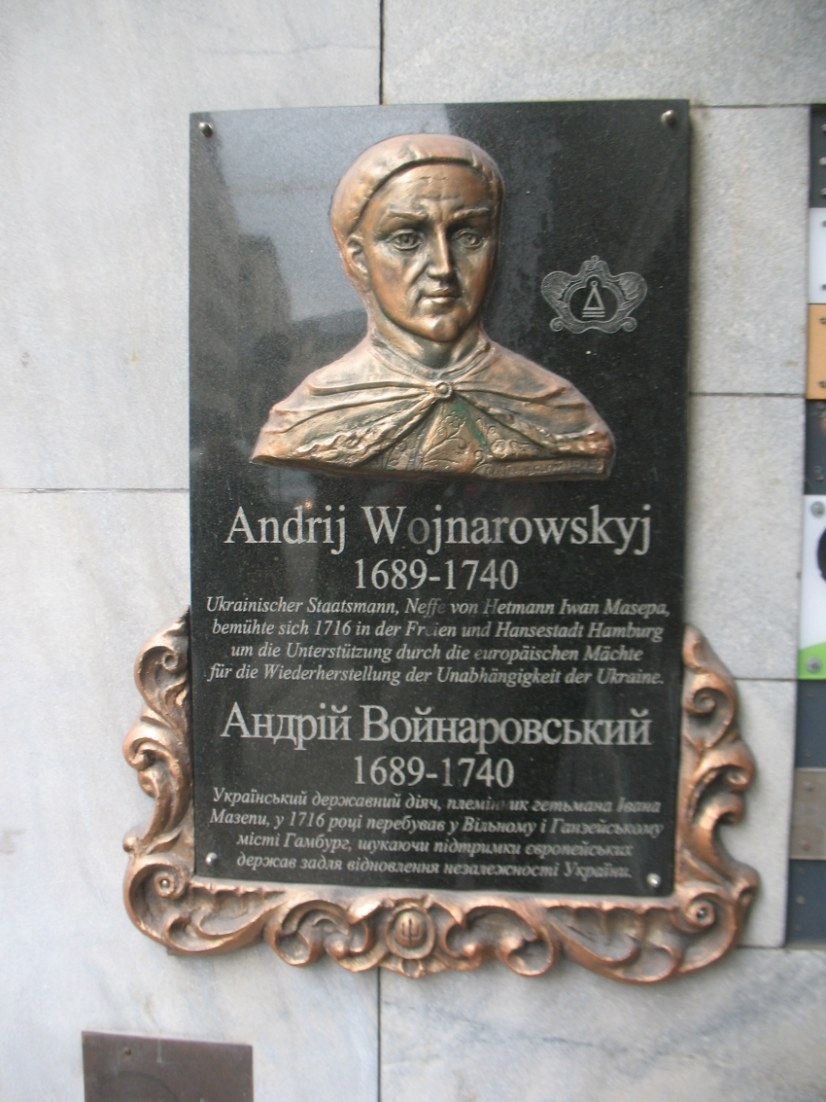
Memorial plaque to Voinarovsky in Hamburg

A Cossack senior officer, Voynarovsky was considered to be one of the contenders for the hetman's mace, along with Pylyp Orlyk and Kost Hordiyenko. Mazepa himself reportedly named Voynarovsky as his heir before his death, aiming to preserve the state treasury by giving it to his nephew as part of inheritance. However, after the hetman died Voynarovsky refused from taking up hetmanship, but still remained a claimant for Mazepa's property. A special commission was instituted by Charles XII in order to divide the money between Voynarovsky and the rest of Zaporozhian Host. In the end, the organ ruled in favour of Vonarovsky, recognizing him as legitimate owner of a significant part of Mazepa's treasury. This decision could have been influenced by the king's debts to the late hetman and his nephew, which amounted to 300 thousand thalers. In the aftermath, fellow Cossacks accused Voynarovsky of appropriating Mazepa's treasures, despriving the Host of financial means. Voynarovsky was described as being indifferent to government issues, putting private interests above public ones. He was smart, educated, but unpretentious in resolving issues, and was, among others, blamed of bribing witnesses.

From 1710 to 1711, together with Pylyp Orlyk, Voynarovsky encouraged the governments of the Ottoman Empire, the Crimean Khanate and a number of European countries to declare war against Muscovy, attempting to form an anti-Moscow coalition of European states. In 1716, on the order of Peter the Great, Voynarovsky was forcibly abducted in the streets of Hamburg, taken to the Russian consulate and later transported to Saint Petersburg, despite not being a Muscovite subject. He was imprisoned in the Peter and Paul Fortress until 1723. Following inquests, Voynarovsky was exiled to Yakutsk, Siberia, where he died in 1742.

== In literature ==
"Voynarovsky" is a poem by Kondraty Ryleyev.
