= Halyna Mazepa =

Ukrainian and Venezuelan artist and illustrator

- Born: 9 February 1910; St. Petersburg, Russian Empire
- Died: 30 June 1995 (aged 85); Caracas, Venezuela
- Spouse: Volodymyr Koval
- Children: 4
- Parents: Isaak Mazepa (father); Natalia Synhalevych (mother)

Halyna Mazepa also known as Halyna Mazepa de Koval (9 February 1910 – 30 June 1995) was a Ukrainian and Venezuelan modern artist, illustrator, and ceramist. She was the daughter of Isaak Mazepa, the Prime Minister of Ukrainian People’s Republic (1919).

== Early life and education ==
Halyna Mazepa was born on 9 February 1910 in St. Petersburg. Her father was Isaak Mazepa, best known as the Prime Minister of Ukrainian People’s Republic. Her mother was Natalia Synhalevych, a bacteriologist and teacher.

In 1915, Mazepa’s family settled in Katerynoslav (now Dnipro, Ukraine). They stayed in Katerynoslav until 1920 when they had to immigrate to Lviv. In 1921, Mazepas moved to Kalisz and in 1923, the family moved to Prague. In the 1920s and 1930s Prague was the intellectual capital of the Ukrainian emigrants.

In Prague Mazepa studied at the Ukrainian Studio of Plastic Arts, the School of Applied Art (1929-1935), and the Academy of Arts. In the 1930s she began painting, illustrating Czech and Ukrainian books, magazines and postcards and designing theatrical and ballet costumes.

== Career ==
=== Early years ===
In 1933, she exhibited for the first time in Berlin and Prague. The same year she visited Paris where she met her future husband Volodymyr Koval. In 1935, Mazepa took part in the Retrospective Exhibition of Ukrainian Art at the National Museum in Lviv.

In 1939, she married Volodymyr Koval. In 1945, their two sons and Mazepa’s mother Natalia Singalevych were killed during the American bombing of Prague. After this loss, Mazepa and her husband moved to Germany.

=== Venezuela ===
In 1947, the family immigrated to Venezuela with their newborn son Bohdan.

In 1948, Mazepa began working for Bolivar Films as a producer of ARS Publicidad, a company specializing in cartoons. The same year she held her first solo exhibition in Venezuela and took part in the IX Official Salon. For the next 25 year she illustrated the popular magazine for primary school children, Tricolor, published by the Venezuelan Ministry of Education. Besides working as an illustrator Mazepa created modern icons (characterized by simple drawing and composition, geometrized faces), paintings in a decorative style with flat compositions on the themes of Ukrainian history and folklore, Venezuelan life, local legends, picturesque ceramics of small forms with national themes, mosaics, costume designs and abstract compositions.

Halyna Mazepa, Fortune Telling - three girls, 1946 61 x 88 cm

In 1965 and 1973, Mazepa travelled through Western Europe. In 1970, she held her first solo show in the United States of America in New York. In 1982, an album of Mazepa’s works was published in Munich by the Ukrainian Free University.

In 1993, Mazepa’s memoirs about her childhood in Ukraine were published in Toronto.

Halyna Mazepa died on 30 June 1995 in Caracas, Venezuela.

== Awards ==
In 1956, Mazepa received an award from the Ministry of Education of Venezuela - the National Prize for Applied Arts.

In 1986, Mazepa's work “Churun Meru” received a special award from the jury at the 5th International Book Illustration Contest in Nome, held by UNESCO.
