= Ivan Mazepa =

Hetman of the Cossack Hetmanate from 1687 to 1709

- Іван Мазепа
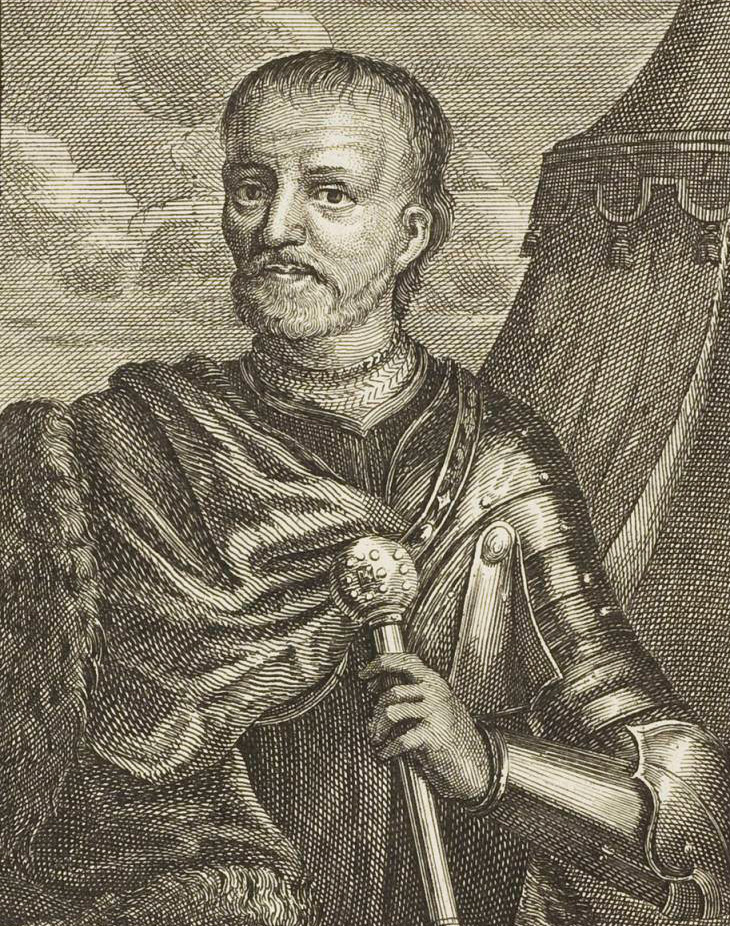
- Mazepa in 1706

Hetman of the Zaporozhian Host
- In office 25 July 1687 – 2 October 1709 (death) (Note: Following his alliance with Sweden, on 11 November 1708 Mazepa was officially removed from his post by Peter I, but continued to be recognised as hetman by Charles XII of Sweden.)
- Preceded by: Ivan Samoylovych
- Succeeded by: Ivan Skoropadsky; Pylyp Orlyk (in exile)

Personal details
- Born: 30 March [O.S. 20 March] 1639 Mazepyntsi, Polish–Lithuanian Commonwealth (now in Ukraine)
- Died: 2 October 1709 (aged 70) [O.S. 21 September] Bender, Principality of Moldavia
- Spouse: Hanna Polovets (m. 1668; died 1702) (Note: Uncertain information; see § Romantic relationships)
- Relatives: Mazepa family
- Education: Kyiv Mohyla Academy
- Awards: Order of the White Eagle; Order of Saint Andrew the Apostle the First-Called; Prince of the Holy Roman Empire

Military service
- Allegiance: Cossack Hetmanate (Note: Mazepa also served the Polish–Lithuanian Commonwealth in his youth, but in 1669, he joined Petro Doroshenko instead.)
- Battles/wars: See list: Polish–Ottoman War (1672–1676); Russo-Turkish War (1672–1681); Chyhyryn campaign (1676); Chyhyryn campaign (1677); Chyhyryn campaign (1678); Russo-Turkish War (1686–1700); Crimean campaigns (1687–1689); Kyzykermen campaign (1690); Azov Campaign (1695); Siege of Kyzykermen (1695); Siege of Azov (1696); Great Northern War; Paliy uprising; Civil war in Poland (1704–1706); Campaign of Grodno; Battle of Poltava

Ivan Stepanovych Mazepa (Note: In this name that follows East Slavic naming customs, the patronymic is Stepanovych and the family name is Mazepa.) (Note: Ukrainian: Іван Степанович Мазепа; Polish: Jan Mazepa-Kołodyński; Russian: Иван Степанович Мазепа; often spelt Mazeppa (with two p's) in English) (30 March [O.S. 20 March] 1639 – 2 October [O.S. 21 September] 1709) was a Ukrainian (Note: Widely considered as such by modern historians; see § Ethnic identity for more detail.) military, political and civic leader who served as hetman of the Cossack Hetmanate in 1687–1709. His long and stable rule was marked by economical and political recovery from the Ruin. A loyal subject of Russia during most of his rule, Mazepa's close relationship with Tsar Peter I deteriorated as a result of the latter's administrative reforms, which increasingly deprived Mazepa and the Hetmanate of their autonomy. In 1708, Mazepa abandoned his alliance with Peter I and sided with Charles XII of Sweden after the Tsar refused to protect the Hetmanate against the advancing Swedes, instead ordering that much of Ukraine be burned to prevent the Swedes from gaining access to supplies and winter quarters.

After the Swedes were defeated at the Battle of Poltava in 1709, Mazepa went into exile in Moldavia and died there later that year. The political consequences and interpretation of his defection have resonated in the national histories of both Ukraine and Russia. The historical events of Mazepa's life have inspired many literary, artistic and musical works, and the hetman himself was famous as a patron of the arts.

The Russian Orthodox Church pronounced an anathema (or the highest form of excommunication) on Mazepa's name in 1708 and has maintained it ever since. The anathema was not recognized by the Ecumenical Patriarchate of Constantinople, which considers it uncanonical and imposed with "political motives as a means of political and ideological repression, with no religious, theological or canonical reasons". Pro-independence and anti-Russian elements in Ukraine from the 18th century onwards were derogatorily referred to as Mazepintsy (Russian: Мазепинцы, lit. 'Mazepists'). The alienation of Mazepa from Ukrainian historiography continued during the Soviet period, but post-1991 in independent Ukraine Mazepa's image has been gradually rehabilitated.

== Early life ==
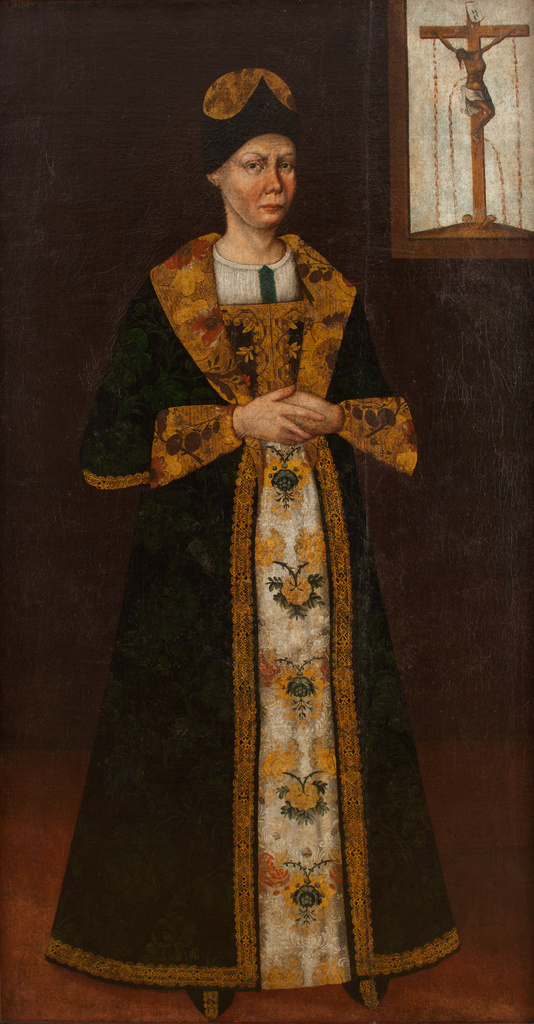
Maryna Mokiievska, later known as Mariia Mahdalena, Mazepa's mother

=== Birth and ancestry ===
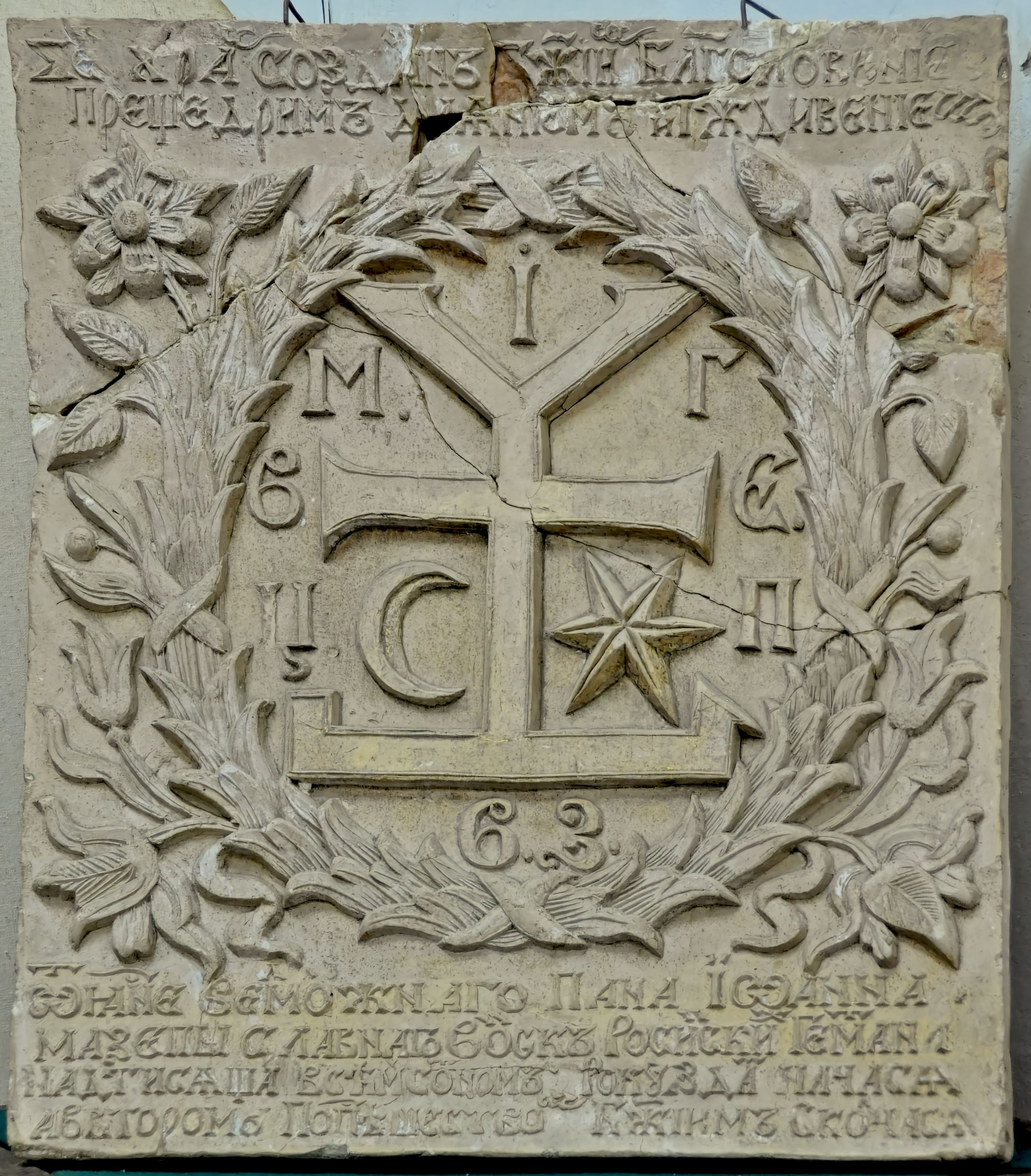
Mazepa's coat of arms, originally installed on the façade of Chernihiv Collegium

Mazepa was born on 30 March [O.S. 20 March] 1639 in the village of Mazepyntsi, near Bila Tserkva, then part of the Kiev Voivodeship of the Polish–Lithuanian Commonwealth, into the noble Mazepa family. His father, Stepan Adam Mazepa-Kaledynsky (Polish: Kołodyński), was the town otaman of Bila Tserkva during the Khmelnytsky Uprising, while his mother, Maryna Mokiievska, was also of Cossack blood. Maryna later became the hegumene of the Pechersk Ascension Monastery in Kyiv after the death of her husband and was then known by her monastic name, Mariia Mahdalena; the couple also had a younger daughter, Oleksandra.

Throughout his life Mazepa used the Kurcz coat of arms, likely inherited from the Bulyha-Kurcewicz family, whose members had served as starosts of Bila Tserkva between 1578–1618. In 1707, Mazepa's coat of arms was confirmed by Joseph I, Holy Roman Emperor, who awarded the hetman with the title of Prince of the Holy Roman Empire.

=== In Polish service ===
In 1657, Stepan Mazepa became involved with Hetman Ivan Vyhovsky, who pursued a pro-Polish policy. In 1659, he travelled to Warsaw to attend the sejm and placed his son Ivan in service at the royal court of John II Casimir Vasa. Before that, Ivan Mazepa studied at the Kyiv Mohyla Collegium in Kyiv graduated with a degree in rhetoric. According to Samiilo Velychko, Ivan was to complete his philosophy course at the Jesuit college in Warsaw.

According to late tradition, King John Casimir sent Ivan Mazepa to study "gunnery" in Deventer (Dutch Republic) in 1656–1659, during which time he travelled across Western Europe. From 1659 the Polish king was sending him on numerous diplomatic missions to Ukraine. His service at the Polish royal court earned him a reputation as an alleged catholicized liakh (a more offensive word for a Pole) – later the Russian Imperial government would effectively use this slur to discredit Mazepa.

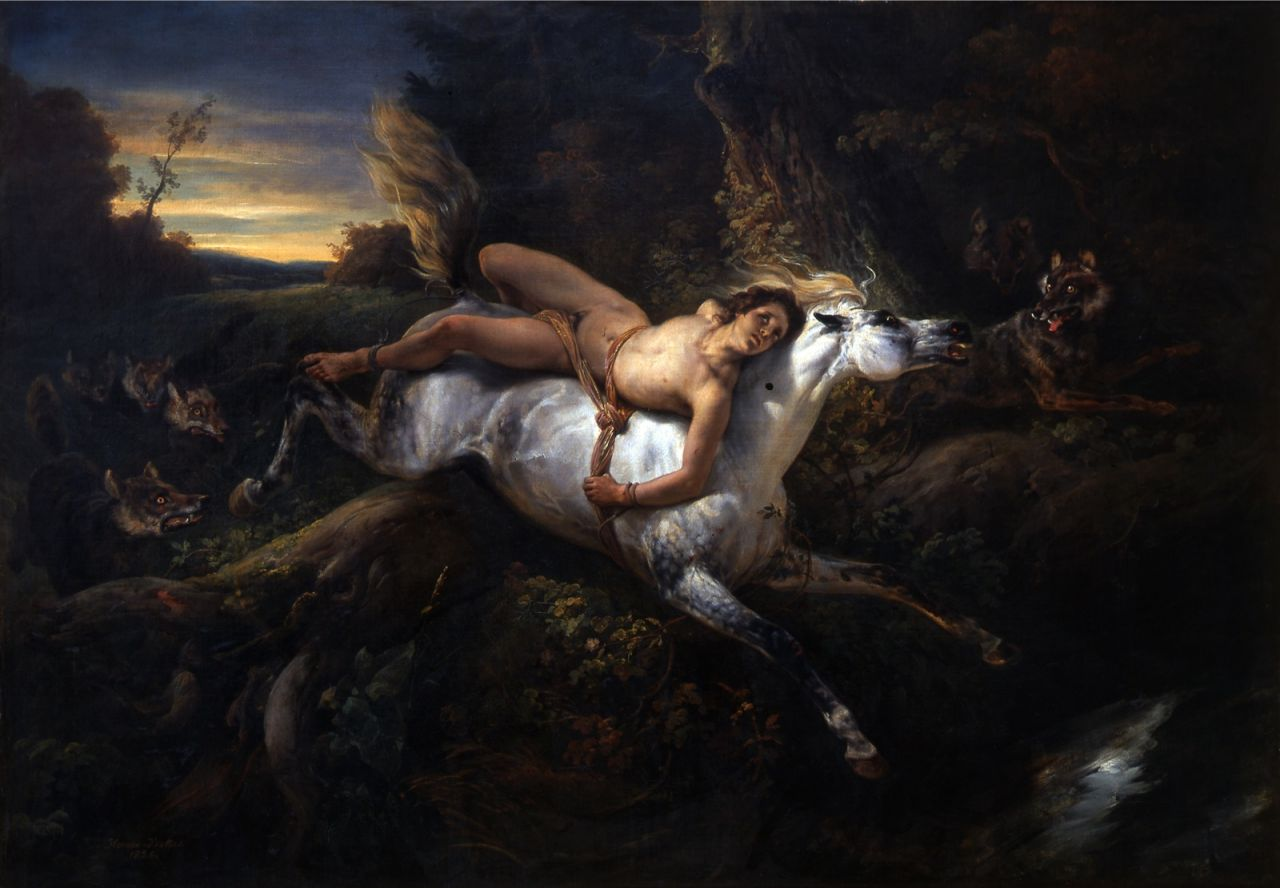
Mazeppa and the Wolves by Horace Vernet (1826) showing a naked Mazepa tied to a horse

During one of his missions, Mazepa met Jan Chryzostom Pasek, whom he took to be a supporter of the anti-royal confederation. He led to Pasek's arrest and had him brought before the king, who was staying in Grodno at the time. According to Pasek's account, he managed to prove his innocence, the king rewarded him for the harm he suffered and Mazepa lost the royal trust. Further on in his memoirs, Pasek recounts the story of under what circumstances Mazepa left Poland in 1663. According to Pasek, Mazepa had an affair with Mrs. Falbowska, wife of his neighbour in Volhynia. When the neighbour discovered the affair, he tied Mazepa naked to a horse, head to tail, and fastened the horse. The horse carried Mazepa to his household, but he was so badly wounded that his own subjects were unable to recognize him. Pasek's memoirs were written in 1690–1695, when Mazepa was already a Cossack hetman; it is possible that Pasek, who had a personal grudge against Mazepa, colored the story. However, this anecdote also appears in the anonymous Memoirs to the Reign of Augustus II and in the memoirs of Marquis de Bonnac. The story was later recounted by Voltaire in his Histoire de Charles XII and became a recurring motif in the literary works of such writers as Victor Hugo, Lord Byron, Alexander Pushkin or Juliusz Słowacki, as well as in the paintings of such painters as Horace Vernet, Eugène Delacroix, Théodore Chassériau, Théodore Géricault and others. The tale was probably widespread by then and referred to Mazepa's reputation as a womanizer.

Despite Pasek's accounts, Mazepa still remained in royal service. In February 1663 he was sent to the Cossack Hetman Pavlo Teteria, to whom he brought the Hetman's mace, presented to Teteria by Tomasz Jan Karczewski. Mazepa then took part in a royal campaign against Russia in Left-bank Ukraine in years 1663–1664. Mazepa was certainly still at the royal court in 1665, probably until the abdication of John II Casimir in 1668.

=== Under Hetman Doroshenko ===
After the death of his father (ca. 1665), Mazepa inherited the title of the Chernihiv cupbearer. From 1669 to 1673 he served under Petro Doroshenko, hetman of Right-Bank Ukraine from 1665 to 1672, as a squadron commander in the Hetman Guard. In this role he participated in Doroshenko's 1672 campaign in Halychyna, and was a chancellor on diplomatic missions to Poland, Crimea, and the Ottoman Empire. In the course of one of such missions, in 1674 Mazepa was captured on his way to Crimea by the Kosh Otaman Ivan Sirko, and during the following seven years served as a "courtier" of Doroshenko's rival, hetman Ivan Samoylovych. From 1677 to 1678 Mazepa participated in the Chyhyryn campaigns, during which Yuri Khmelnytsky, with the support from the Ottoman Empire, tried to regain power in Ukraine. The young, educated Mazepa quickly rose through the Cossack ranks, being promoted to army osaul in 1681, which brought him close to the elite (starshyna) of Cossack military leadership.

== Hetman of the Zaporozhian Host ==
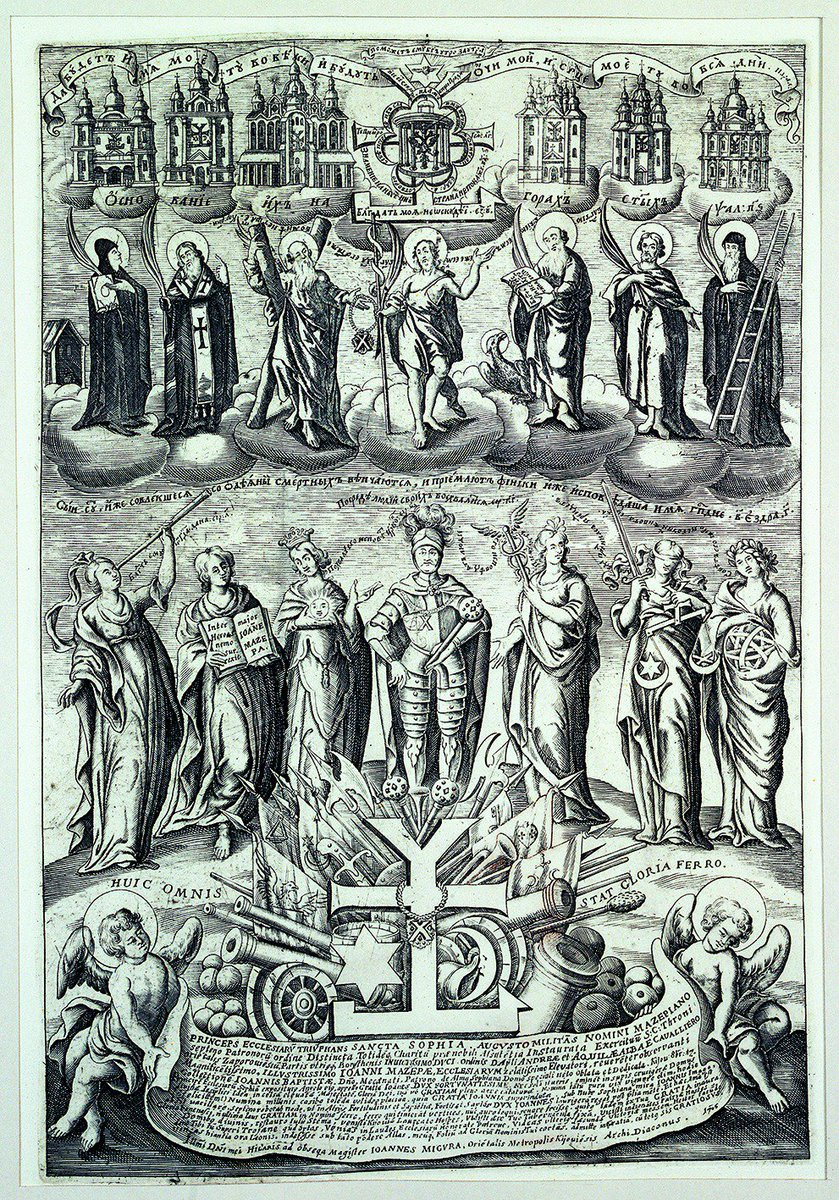
A 1705 Baroque engraving commissioned by Mazepa, depicting the hetman standing above his personal coat of arms and wearing the Order of St. Andrew on his chest, surrounded by saints, allegorical figures and depictions of churches whose construction he had financed

=== Early rule ===
In 1687 Mazepa accused Samoylovych of conspiring to secede from Russia, secured his ouster, and was elected hetman of Left-bank Ukraine in Kolomak, with the support of Vasily Galitzine. Following his confirmation, the new hetman signed the Kolomak Articles, which were based on the Hlukhiv Articles of Demian Mnohohrishny. In 1689 Mazepa supported the deposition of Tsarevna Sophia, who had served as de facto regent of Tsar Peter I. This helped him ingratiate himself with the monarch, who valued the wide experience and education of the much older hetman. In words of a Russian historian, Mazepa "was like a father to Peter I in a sense".

As hetman, Mazepa used his knowledge in military matters to introduce a new successful strategy in the fight against the Tatars and their Ottoman overlords. This success relieved both Ukraine and Muscovy from the danger of devastating enemy raids and led Peter I to award the hetman with the Order of St. Andrew, the Tsardom's highest honour. The order, as well as the title of honourable prince of the Holy Roman Empire, awarded to the hetman by Emperor Joseph I in 1707 as recognition of his help in the fight against the Ottomans and Tatars, greatly contributed to Mazepa's status both in Ukraine and at the Moscow court.

With the personal agreement of Peter I, Mazepa managed to become an undisputed ruler of the Hetmanate, concentrating most power over Ukraine, including gathering of taxes, in hands of his own administration. As hetman, Mazepa became known as a patron of culture and arts. A multitude of churches were built all over Ukraine during his reign in the Ukrainian Baroque style. He founded schools and printing houses, and expanded the Kiev-Mohyla Academy, the primary educational institution of Ukraine at the time. In many regards Mazepa greatly contributed to the establishment of the Russian Empire by supporting the policies of Peter I and providing the monarch with people needed to bring his reformist ideas into life. For example, the majority of religious figures who helped Peter I to reform the Russian Orthodox Church by bringing it under increased state control came from the Hetmanate, including Orthodox bishops Stefan Yavorsky and Theophan Prokopovich.

Himself a highly educated person who could speak both Latin and German, Mazepa established his court in a Western manner, reflecting the influence of Baroque art and literature on Ukrainian lands during that period. Mazepa's personal residence was reported to house one of the most extensive libraries of its time, containing numerous books and illuminated manuscripts from around Europe.

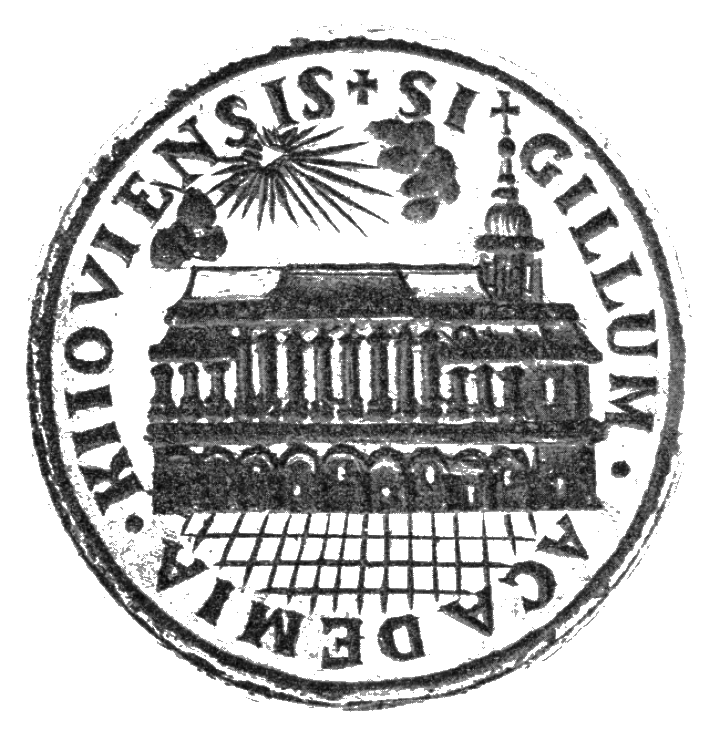
18th-century seal of the Kyiv-Mohyla Academy, which became widely known as the Mazepa-Mohyla Academy in the early 18th century due to Mazepa's generous patronage

==== Domestic policy ====
Mazepa inherited a country which was only gradually recovering from the devastating years of civil war following Bohdan Khmelnytsky's death, known as the Ruin. Financial troubles arose even before Khmelnytsky's death, however: the Hetmanate had committed to maintaining an army of 60,000 Registered Cossacks and paying them a fixed salary in agreements with Russia. This cost the treasury nearly two million zloty per annum. In addition to this, Russia was to receive some income as well. Meanwhile, Khmelnytsky could only collect c. 600,000 zloty annually, of which half constituted income from the leasehold system, in which the privilege, or lease (Ukrainian: оренда, romanized: orenda), to engage in certain trades (such as milling, distilling alcohol, and brewing beer and mead) was sold to willing buyers; this was largely a continuation of the existing Polish-Lithuanian system. The rest was made up of import and export fees and other taxes. The result of this large budget deficit was that the Registered Cossacks were not paid their salaries, which undermined the very foundation of the Cossack state.

Mazepa's predecessor, Hetman Ivan Samoylovych had managed to restore a measure of stability and raise taxes through a continuation of the old leasehold system. At the end of his rule, however, Prince Golitsyn insisted on an abolition of the leasehold taxes. The Kolomak Articles, signed at the beginning of Mazepa's rule, also supported the abolition of leaseholding. This, however, once again left the Hetmanate without a suitable way to raise taxes to pay for the increasingly important mercenary, or professional, infantry (serdiuk) and cavalry (kompaniiets) regiments.

The Hetmanate faced severe financial difficulty as a result of Peter's centralising policies and particularly the start of the Great Northern War: in 1700, Peter I banned the sale of saltpetre abroad, which was at the time one of the largest Ukrainian exports. The Artillery Office, which became the sole purchaser of Ukrainian saltpetre, did not require the entirety of Ukrainian production, hurting the Ukrainian saltpetre industry by artificially restricting its size and profitability. In 1701, the export of Ukrainian hemp through the usual markets in Königsberg and Riga was forbidden, leaving Arkhangelsk the only remaining route for export. This disrupted the original trade routes through Silesia and negatively impacted the foreign trade balance of the Hetmanate. In a 1704 letter, Mazepa mentions having to collect 30,000 rubles for the Tsar, which warranted an increase in taxes on the common folk to collect this sum; General Dolgorukov requisitioned without compensation 5,000 horses in 1705, while in 1706, General von Roenne took provisions from the Chernihiv regiment. The financial discontent reached a level where it was discussed even abroad, while the Cossack starshyna was accusing Mazepa of having placed them in such a situation.

=== Great Northern War ===
==== Battling the Swedes ====
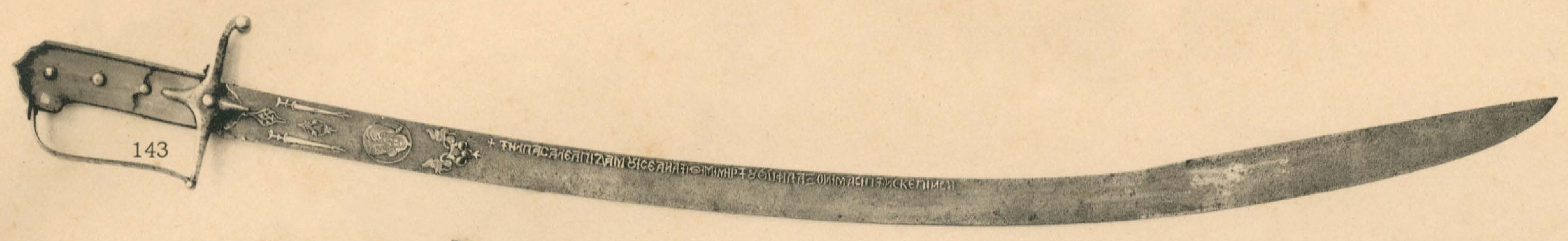
Mazepa's saber from the collection of Chernihiv Regional Historical Museum

In 1700, as the Russian Empire entered the Great Northern War against the Swedish Empire, Mazepa, despite having concerns about the Tsar's adventurous foreign policies, supported Peter I with troops and resources. In 1702, the Cossacks of Right-bank Ukraine, under the leadership of colonel Semen Paliy, began an uprising against Poland, which after early successes was defeated. Mazepa convinced Russian Tsar Peter I to allow him to intervene, which he successfully did, taking over major portions of Right-bank Ukraine, while Poland was weakened by an invasion of Swedish king Charles XII. In 1704 Peter I allowed the hetman to incorporate the Right-bank territories into the Hetmanate, uniting Ukraine on both sides of the Dnieper for the first time in decades.

At the same time, Peter I decided to reform the Russian army and to centralize control over his realm. In Mazepa's opinion, the strengthening of Russia's central power could put at risk the broad autonomy granted to the Cossack Hetmanate under the Treaty of Pereyaslav in 1654. Attempts to assert control over the Zaporozhian Cossacks included demands of having them fight in any of the tsar's wars, instead of only defending their own land against regional enemies as was agreed to in previous treaties. Now Cossack forces were made to fight in distant wars in Livonia and Lithuania, leaving their own homes unprotected from the Tatars and Poles. Ill-equipped and not properly trained to fight on par with the tactics of modern European armies, Cossacks suffered heavy losses and low morale. The Hetman himself started to feel his post threatened in the face of increasing calls to replace him with one of the abundant generals of the Russian army.

In this respect, the provision of a princely title to the hetman by the Holy Roman Emperor in 1707, which likely took place at the request of Peter I, can be interpreted as a conciliatory prize to Mazepa before his removal from hetmanship. In April of the same year, at a military council in Zhovkva, Peter openly declared his intent to transform the Zaporozhian Host into a regular army, eliminating the elected status of Cossack starshyna. Mazepa was well-informed about Peter's diplomatic efforts, in which Ukraine played the role of a mere object of talks. An especially worrying concern for the hetman were the tsar's negotiations with Poland, whose government still issued claims on Left-bank Ukraine and Kyiv due to the Sejm's refusal to ratify the Eternal Peace of 1686. In 1704, during talks in Narva, the Polish side demanded to provide its magnates right to colonize Ukrainian lands. Additionally, in 1707 Peter's government contacted John Churchill, 1st Duke of Marlborough, seeking his moderation in the war against Sweden, and promising him "any land", including Kyiv, in exchange.

As both Peter I and his enemy Charles XII of Sweden were supported by Polish noble factions during the ongoing war, the victory of any of the sides presented a threat to the Hetmanate, as a victorious monarch was likely to award his Polish allies with possessions in Ukraine. In order to evade such scenario, Mazepa employed his knowledge of Machiavellian politics and started his own diplomatic game. In 1703 the hetman established contacts with Charles' Polish allies through his envoy, Starodub colonel Mykhailo Myklashevsky, whose unit was during that time stationed in Livonia. During the talks, the possibility of Ukraine's return under the rule of the Commonwealth was discussed. However, Peter eventually learned about the negotiations, and demanded from Mazepa to punish the colonel. Not wishing to demoralize his supporters, Mazepa chose to remove Myklashevsky from his post, but later reinstated him.

==== Growing discontent ====
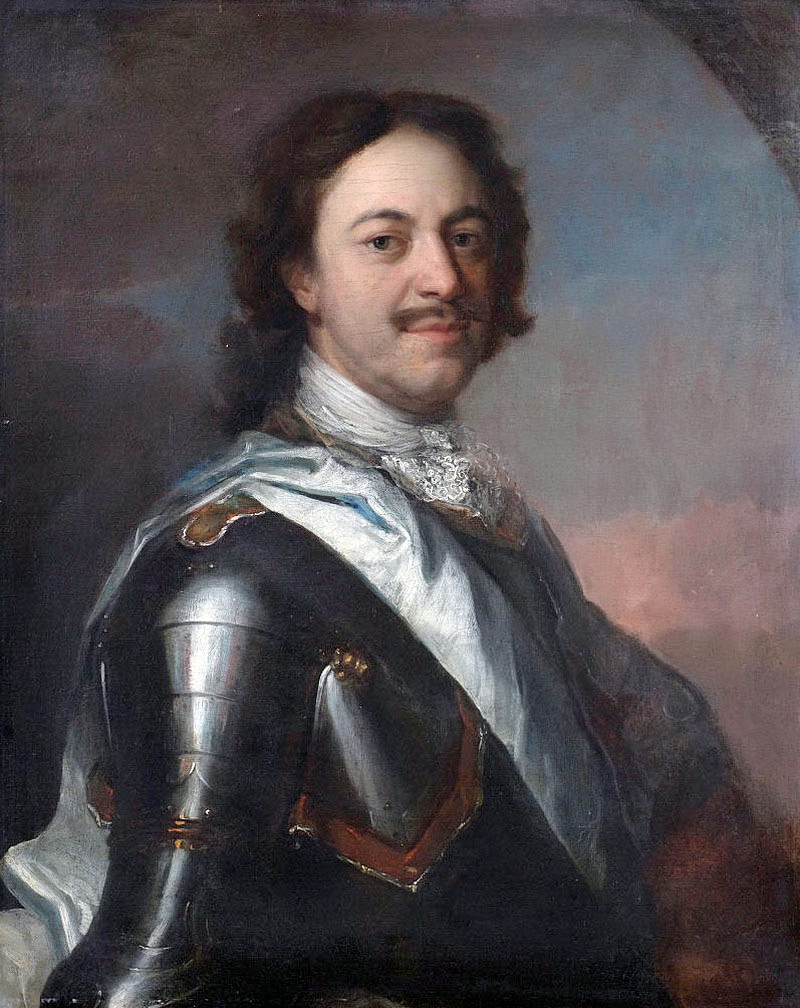
Peter I in 1717, painting by Carel de Moor

Having decisively defeated the pro-Russian Augustus II the Strong in 1706 and the Danes earlier, Charles XII began his march on Moscow in early 1708 with a 50,000 strong army. Sweden seemed to be the dominant power in eastern Europe, while Sweden's ally, king Stanisław Leszczyński was poised to attack Left-bank Ukraine. Mazepa, meanwhile, had requested that Peter I provide at least 10,000 troops to defend Ukraine from the advancing Poles and Swedes, justifying his request by the fact that his own forces were dispersed along other fronts of the war; Peter allegedly responded "Not only ten thousand, but even ten men I cannot give. Defend yourself as you are able." This was a deep blow for Mazepa and the starshyna, who saw in this refusal to defend a loyal vassal a direct violation of the Kolomak Articles, signed at the beginning of Mazepa's rule, which had explicitly obliged Russia to protect Ukraine from military threats. The leadership of the Hetmanate now recalled the Khmelnytsky Uprising, when the Cossacks had renounced their oath to the Polish king after the latter had violated his obligations towards the Zaporozhian Host.

At the same time, the scorched earth policy of Peter, first conceived in 1707 and then implemented in August 1708, was deeply unpopular with both the common folk and with the Cossack elite of the Hetmanate. The Russian voevoda, or military governor, of the Kyiv region Dmitrii Golitsyn ordered Mazepa's troops to burn the land and mills through which Swedish troops were likely to pass. Peter's personal decree of 9 August 1708 to General Nikolai Iflant was more severe, stating that Iflant was to burn the grain in fields and barns, the buildings, mills and bridges, and to drive the local population into the woods if the Swedes were to enter Ukraine. In September of the same year, Peter ordered all officers and inhabitants of the Pochep sotnia in Starodub to be driven from their villages to the towns, making no effort at providing homes for the displaced. Mazepa was deeply embittered by this perceived betrayal of the Tsar, writing to the colonel of Poltava in November 1708:

Such is their valour, any devoted son of the Little Russian fatherland can understand about this, that Moscow is not protecting us; [Moscow] has prepared to destroy the whole region and uproot the Little Russian people.

To the Ukrainian peasantry, which would not profit from the Tsar's goals in the Great Northern War (access to the Baltic Sea and trade with western Europe), it was no more appealing to accept the destruction of their towns and villages than to come under Swedish occupation. Prince Menshikov wrote in late 1708 that his troops "provoke only hatred from the inhabitants of the Little Russian region" while they stand and "burn them and steal their grain." Discontent grew amongst the population, which often blamed Mazepa for their troubles, as it was his administration that carried out Peter's orders. In May 1708, peasants in Chernihiv rose up and fought against the Kalmyks, which were plundering the countryside for supplies. The Cossacks sent to suppress Bulavin's rebellion on the Don increasingly took the side of the rebels instead of Tsarist troops.

==== Change of sides ====
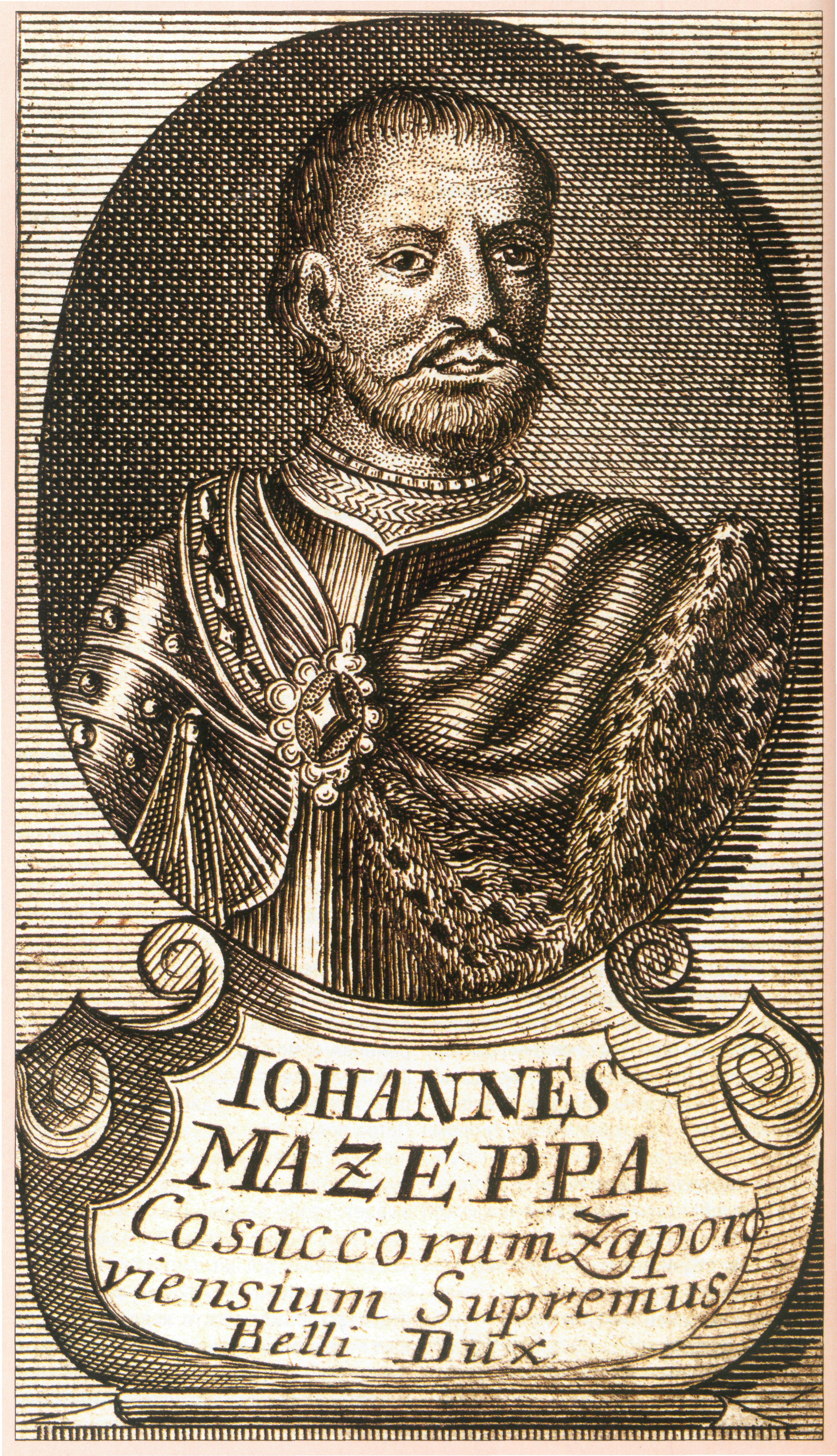
A posthumous German engraving of Mazepa from 1715

Charles Whitworth, the English ambassador to Russia, wrote in September that Mazepa will struggle to keep the population loyal if the Swedes were to approach. In late 1708, discontent grew even further, with riots happening all major towns and cities of the Hetmanate. Around this time, Mazepa sold all his estates in Russia. Having established contact with Leszczyński back in 1705, but not having seriously considered a change of sides yet, Mazepa finally made his move, defecting to the Swedes in late October 1708.

Mazepa, however, could only muster a small force to follow him: the Nizhyn and Pereiaslav regiments were stationed in Smolensk, while the Starodub and Chernihiv regiments were in Propoisk, both cities far to the north of left-bank Ukraine; the Kyiv Regiment was located in Right-bank Ukraine; the Poltava Regiment and the professional cavalry units were suppressing the Bulavin Rebellion of the Don Cossacks on the Don river to the east, while the Hadiach Regiment was in Kyiv. Thus, only 2,800 inexperienced cavalrymen and one infantry regiment remained at Mazepa's disposal, totalling about 4,000 men. The poor state of the Hetmanate's army could be explained by Mazepa's loyal service in the Great Northern War against Sweden: over 40,000 Cossacks had been sent to the frontline, and in some regiments, fatality rates were over 60 or 70 percent. Moreover, Cossacks had been engaged in large-scale construction and engineering works, primarily in the cold and swampy Gulf of Finland region, which likewise claimed the lives of many Ukrainians.

Despite the low number of actual combat-worthy troops to join Mazepa, the starshyna, or the Cossack officer elite, had overwhelmingly supported and joined Mazepa's defection. Of the ten colonels on the left bank, six had joined Mazepa, whereas the four that did not (the colonels of the aforementioned Nizhyn, Starodub, Chernihiv, and Pereiaslav, including Ivan Skoropadsky and Pavlo Polubotok) could not have physically joined him, for they were stationed far away; notably, even of those four, Skoropadsky and Polubotok expressed sympathy towards Mazepa's actions. Polubotok would later die in 1725 while imprisoned in the Peter and Paul Fortress for supporting Ukrainian autonomy, while Skoropadsky was later declared a traitor by Peter. The entirety of the general staff and general clerks (including Samiilo Velychko) had followed him, which caused the Russian administration to report an acute shortage of qualified scribes in January 1709.

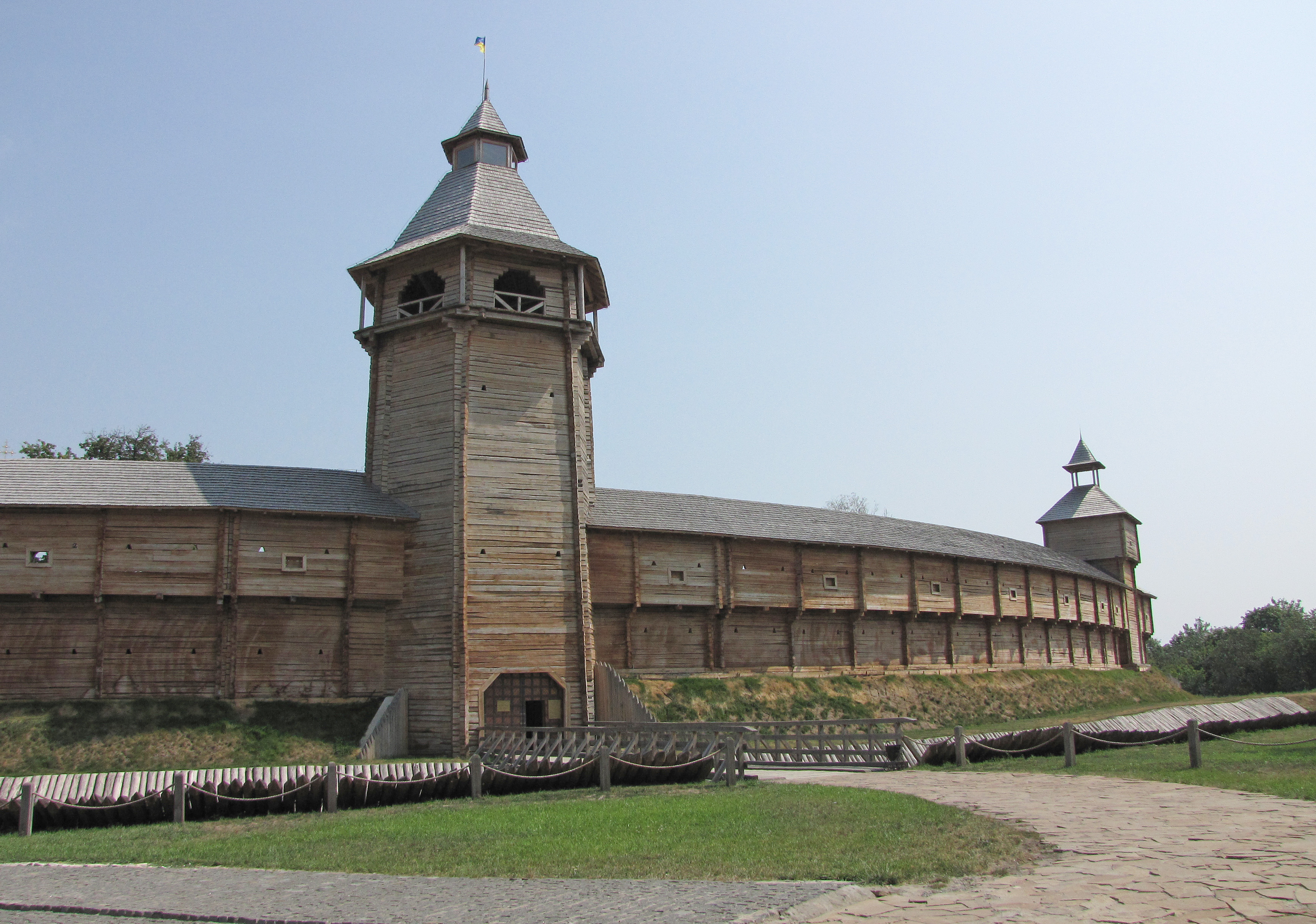
A modern reconstruction of the Baturyn fortress

Peter, having learned of Mazepa's defection, initially struggled to believe the reports that the seventy year old Mazepa, hitherto loyal to him, would switch sides. However, upon accepting the truth, he set out to carry out brutal retribution by sacking Baturyn, the capital of the Hetmanate, on 24 October 1708. Already on 2 November, Baturyn fell to the Russian troops after a local Cossack showed them a hidden entry to the town fort. The Russian troops then proceeded to massacre up to 15,000 inhabitants (including men, women and children) of the city, while all governmental buildings were ransacked and destroyed. The scale of the violence was such that the Seim river ran red with blood for several days afterwards. Charles XII and Mazepa reached Baturyn on 7 November, finding the city a smouldering ruin. The loss of the city's garrison and large stockpile (which had included cannon, gunpowder, food and fodder) was a significant setback for the Swedes. Peter then designated Hlukhiv the new capital of the Hetmanate and, having arrived there, personally arranged for the election of a new hetman, Ivan Skoropadsky.

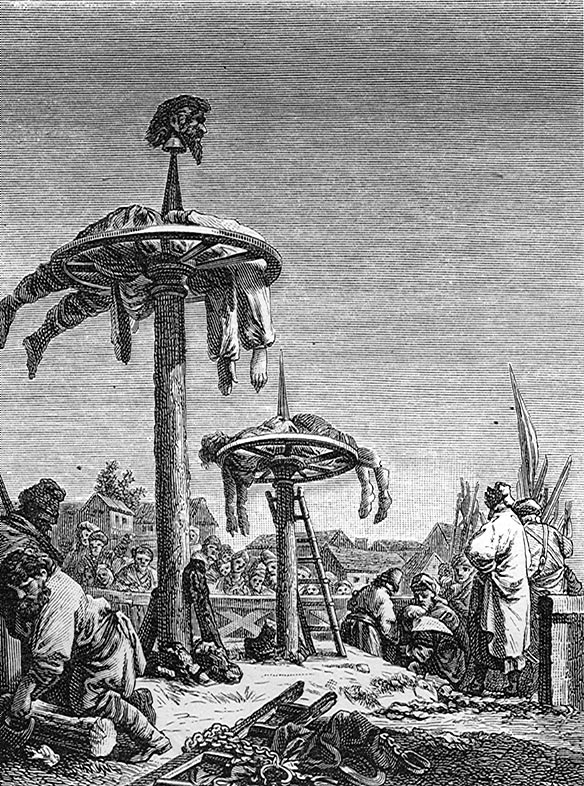
Men broken at the wheel during Peter's rule

The Cossack officers who did not attend the election of Skoropadsky in Hlukhiv or those suspected of loyalty to Mazepa in general were then rounded up at Peter's headquarters in Lebedyn, where a special court tried and found guilty over 900 officers (including a diplomatic mission from the Zaporozhian Sich), who were then executed. Local civilians suspected of harbouring sympathies towards Mazepa were also subject to torture and execution; in particular, Prince Menshikov's men acted especially cruelly, employing methods such as dismemberment, use of the breaking wheel and impalement.

==== Diplomatic efforts and anathema ====
On 5 November 1708, an anathema (formal excommunication and denunciation) was declared by the Russian Orthodox Church while his effigy was hanged in Moscow. While traditional, primarily Russian, historiography has largely held the view that the Church unanimously condemned Mazepa's change of allegiance to the Lutheran Swedes, 21st century scholarship has taken the contrary position. For instance, the Ukrainian-born hieromonk Harvasii of the Solovetsky Monastery in Russia declared in 1727 during a recitation of the anathema that, "Our Mazepa is a saint, but your Moskal is a son without honour." Similarly, 3 years earlier, an archpriest from Lokhvytsia in Poltava Regiment had said that Mazepa was a saint that would go to heaven. More significantly, Stefan Yavorsky, the Ukrainian archbishop of the Russian Orthodox Church who declared the anathema against Mazepa at Peter's decision, did himself not support the declaration; he wrote (but did not deliver) several sermons which criticised Peter's rule, while the text of the anathema itself largely praises Mazepa's deeds over the 20 years of his rule, condemning him only at the very end.

Against the background of immense stress, campaigning and advanced age, Mazepa's already poor health – as he suffered from a severe form of gout – deteriorated even further. Despite this, he then exerted considerable effort at winning over the support of the Zaporozhian Sich, ruled by the Kish Otaman Kost Hordiienko. This was an unlikely alliance, as from the very beginning of his political career, when he was captured and almost killed by the Zaporozhians of Ivan Sirko, he had held a negative view of the Zaporozhians, describing them as "brigands" in private letters. Nevertheless, Mazepa sent several letters to Hordiienko, who responded on 24 November that the Zaporozhians were ready to serve under the Swedish king, but demanded that ambassadors be sent for negotiations. A key Zaporozhian demand was the removal of the Kam'ianyi Zaton and Samar fortresses, which had been conceived and built with Mazepa's participation several years earlier, to protect against Crimean Tatar raids, but also to limit the autonomy of the Sich.

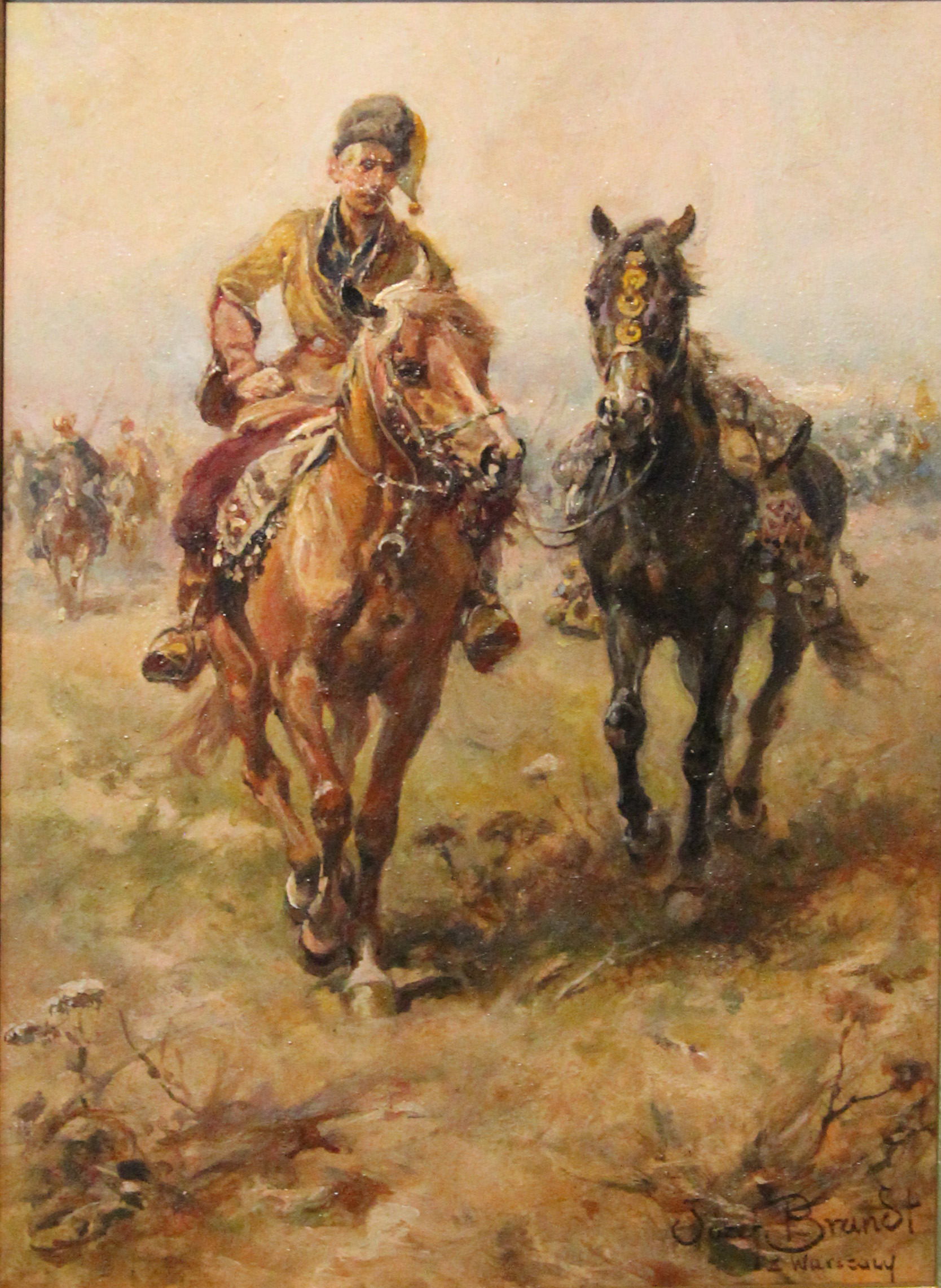
Zaporozhian Cossacks on horseback, painting by Józef Brandt

Peter and Menshikov, fearing the Zaporozhian cavalry would link up with the Swedish infantry at Perevolochna, likewise attempted to persuade the Sich to side with Russia instead. On 12 November 1708, Peter sent a directive instructing Hordiienko to avoid siding with Mazepa and instead come to Hlukhiv to participate in the election of a new hetman; Hordiienko refused. Ivan Skoropadsky's envoy, having arrived to notify the Zaporozhians of Skoropadsky's election as new hetman was almost beaten to death by Hordiienko himself. Unable to persuade Hordiienko diplomatically, Peter wrote to Menshikov on 21 February 1709 that he concurred with Skoropadsky's desire to "change the kish otaman". A group of loyal Cossacks were selected and sent to the Sich to overthrow Hordiienko, but they proved unable to do so.

Mazepa's diplomatic effort, however, was successful: having sent his best officers as envoys, Hordiienko finally wrote a letter expressing his desire to work together with Mazepa and the Swedes against the "evil-minded Moscow" on 16 April. Mazepa and Hordiienko subsequently met in Dykanka, after which the Zaporozhian swore allegiance to Charles XII and signed an agreement with Mazepa and the king. A Zaporozhian Cossack force c. 5,000 – c. 8,000 strong then joined the Swedish camp from the Sich. This had an immediate impact on the other Cossack regiments of Ukraine, especially in Right-bank Ukraine and Poltava, where unrest against the Russian and Polish-Lithuanian governments increased, causing great concern to both Sieniawski and Golitsyn.

==== Battle of Poltava ====
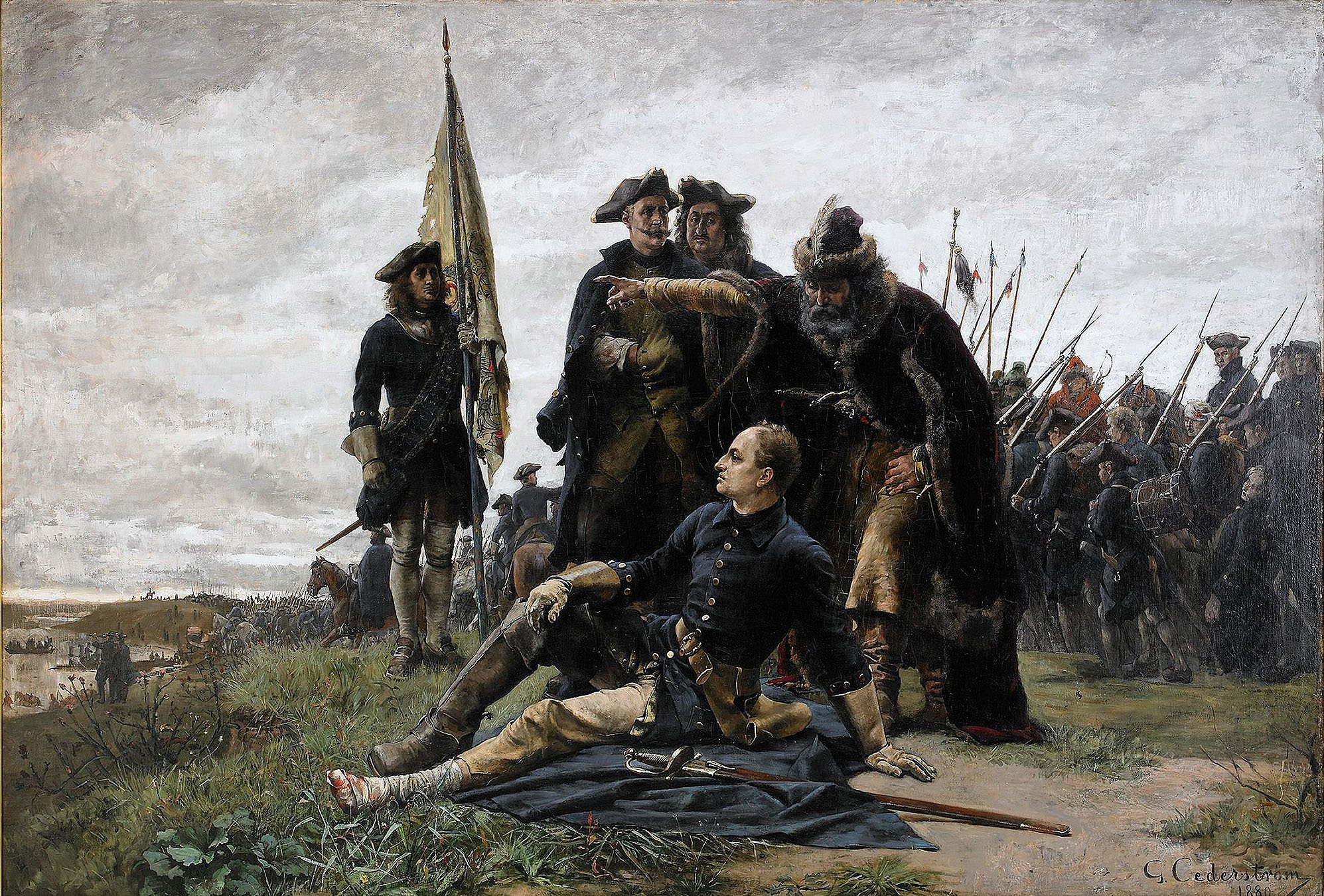
Charles XII and Mazepa at Dnieper after the Battle of Poltava, painting by Gustaf Cederström (1880)

The Swedish and Russian armies spent the first half of 1709 maneuvering for advantage in the anticipated great battle, and trying to secure the support of the local populace. Finally in June the Battle of Poltava took place. It was won by Russia and Peter the Great, putting an end to Mazepa's hopes of transferring Ukraine into the control of Sweden, which in a treaty had promised independence to Ukraine.

=== Exile and death ===
Following the defeat of the Swedes at Poltava, as Charles did not allow Mazepa's forces to participate in the battle, Mazepa retreated along with the Swedish king and a handful of supporters into the city of Bendery in the Ottoman Empire. He died on 2 October [O.S. 21 September] 1709 (Note: The highly influential Ukrainian historians Mykhailo Hrushevsky and Mykola Kostomarov mistakenly gave the date of death to be 2 September [O.S. 22 August] 1709, which is sometimes repeated even in modern works.) of stroke, as a complication of his gout. Mazepa was initially interred in the village of Varnița, and later reburied in Galați (now Romania), but his tomb was disturbed several times and eventually lost as a result of the Sfântul Gheorghe (St. George) Church demolition in 1962.

== Appearance ==
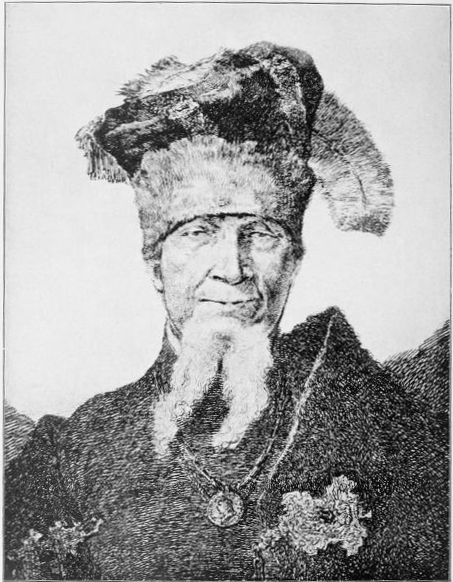
A portrait of a Jewish leaseholder by Norblin, often misattributed as a portrait of Ivan Mazepa himself

Contemporary description from 1704 described Mazepa as having bright eyes, thin fair hands ("like those of a woman") and a sturdy body. The hetman's face was said to be far from beautiful, but he still produced an image of elegance to those who met him, and was reputed to be a good horserider.

A large variety of contemporary portraits of Mazepa were produced at the height of the Ukrainian cultural renaissance, during which Ukrainian Baroque flourished under Mazepa's patronage. However, following his defection to Sweden, Russian authorities sought to erase the memory of the late hetman: his crest was removed from churches he had built, his name blacked out in books, while his portraits were destroyed or painted over. As a result of old material largely being lost, new portraits of the Mazepa often vary significantly; a portrait by the influential Norblin, long thought to be of Mazepa, in fact depicts a Jewish leaseholder, not the hetman.

An engraving by the German Martin Bernigerot for the European Fama (German: Die Europäische Fama) periodical, first appearing in print in 1706 and then again in 1708 and 1712, is one of the most accurate surviving portraits of Mazepa and is used in this article. It is based on actual contemporary sketches or preliminary portraits made by the German adviser to the Tsar Heinrich von Huyssen, rather than verbal description of the hetman's appearance. Huyssen transferred these sketches to Bernigerot for engraving, where the finished products survived Tsarist censorship.

== Personal life ==
=== Personality ===
According to the memoirs of his secretary and close ally Pylyp Orlyk, Mazepa had a great talent for attracting people. His good education and manners, as well as knowledge of numerous languages, among them Polish, Russian, Latin, Italian, German, Tatar and Turkish (besides his native Old Ukrainian) made him a popular companion in conversation and an invaluable intelligence asset. In particular, his excellent knowledge of Latin, at a time when there were said to only be four Latin speakers in Muscovy, earned the powerful Prince Golitsyn's attention. Mazepa was, however, described by the French ambassador as being one who "belongs to those people that prefer either to keep quiet or speak and not to say anything."

Mazepa was noted for being deeply proud of his own intellectual abilities, while being disdainful of those he who found to have inferior intelligence. The Russian historian Vladimir Artamonov writes that, "It is indisputable that Mazepa possessed an intellect, diplomatic abilities, and a broad political outlook."

=== Romantic relationships ===
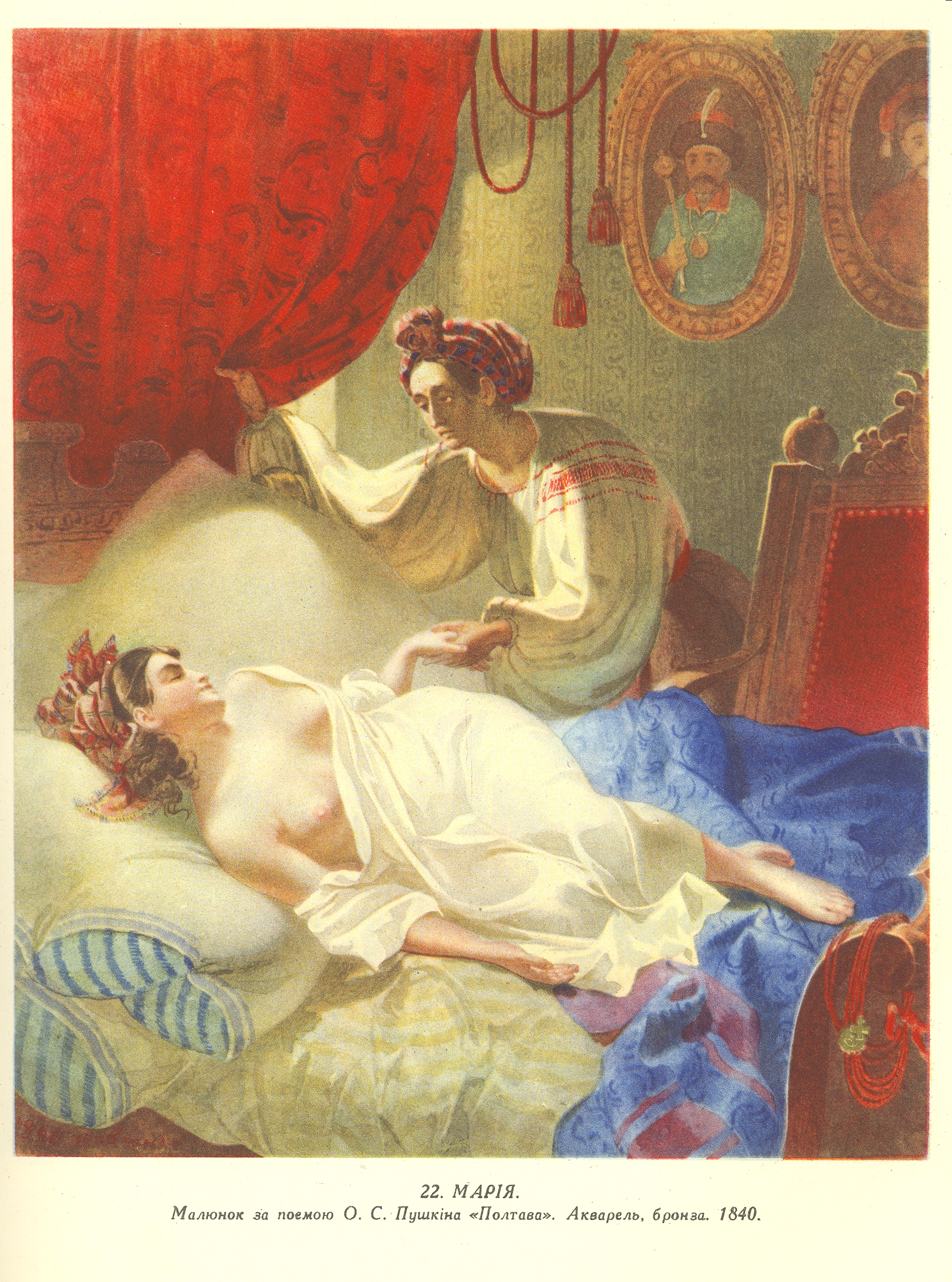
A painting by Taras Shevchenko depicting Motria Kochubey on the bed in Mazepa's palace

According to the classical interpretation based on historian Mykola Kostomarov's work, in 1668 Mazepa married one Anna (Hanna), the daughter of Bila Tserkva colonel Semen Polovets and widow of his successor Samuil Frydrykiewicz. That marriage allowed Mazepa to enter the circles of Right-bank Cossack starshyna, contributing to his career rise. Hanna died in 1702.

The above interpretation is increasingly challenged by modern scholarship, as in 2015, a 118 page long manuscript on Mount Athos was discovered which contains a wealth of information about the patrons of the Zograf Monastery from Ukraine and Russia. The names of patrons and their families were recorded from 1639 to the late eighteenth century. Multiple prominent Cossack officers are listed there, including Ivan Samoylovych, Danylo Apostol, Pavlo Polubotok and others, as well as the name of Ivan Mazepa and 19 members of his family (which is the most complete record of the hetman's family yet discovered). Immediately after Ivan, a certain Maria is listed while a Hanna is nowhere to be found, suggesting that Maria was the wife of Mazepa, as the entries for other patrons name the wife in the second place as well. This theory is partially supported by the common usage of Maria instead of Motrona or Motria when referring to the much younger love interest of Mazepa, Motria Kochubey, as by Alexander Pushkin in his Poltava poem: the true name of Mazepa's wife may have been preserved in folklore, but then mistakenly merged with the name of Motria Kochubey over time. Thus, Hanna Frydrykevych may not have been the wife of Mazepa. Whatever the true name or identity of Mazepa's wife was, she died in 1702.

In 1704, at the age of 65, Mazepa started courting the much younger Motria Kochubey, daughter of chief judge Vasyl Kochubey. No reliable records detailing Motria's age have been preserved: Yaroslav Tynchenko suggests she was 16, while Pavlenko states she was 18–22 years old in 1704. Motria's parents strictly opposed the possibility of their marriage, as the hetman was her godparent, and such a union would be prohibited according to church law. However, Motria disobeyed, and in the same year fled her parents' house to live with Mazepa. Fearing a scandal which could lead to his own anathema, the hetman sent Motria back, but the couple continued their contacts in correspondence. In total, twelve love letters written by Mazepa to Motria have been preserved. Kochubey eventually married his daughter to a member of Cossack starshyna called Chuikevych.

Mazepa's affair with Kochubey's daughter led to a conflict between the two men. In 1707 Kochubey accused Mazepa of treason in a letter to Peter I, but the following investigation blamed the denouncer himself due to being bribed by the hetman. After numerous tortures, in July 1708 Kochubey and another accuser of Mazepa, Poltava colonel Ivan Iskra, were delivered to the hetman's military camp and beheaded (following Mazepa's desertion both would be posthumously rehabilitated and reburied in Kyiv Pechersk Lavra). Motria herself was exiled to Siberia together with her husband, and upon her return would become a nun.

=== Ethnic identity ===
The term and concept of a fatherland (Ukrainian: отчизна, romanized: otchyzna) was an important feature of late 17th- and early 18th-century political discourse in both the Polish-Lithuanian Commonwealth and the territory of modern Ukraine. Before Khmelnytsky's uprising, Poland or the Grand Duchy of Lithuania were most commonly referred to as the fatherlands of their inhabitants, and Polonised Ruthenian noblemen such as Jeremi Wiśniowiecki or the Czartoryskis were described as sons of Poland or Lithuania, not of the Rus' or Ukraine.

After the formation of the Cossack Hetmanate and the break from Poland, the slow transferral of the fatherland away from Poland or the Commonwealth began. While pro-Polish hetmans continued to refer to Poland as a "common fatherland" with the Poles, by the 1660s, Cossack Ukraine was increasingly seen as the fatherland of its inhabitants. Hetman Ivan Briukhovetsky of Left-bank Ukraine became one of the first to introduce this new idea of a Ukrainian fatherland into common political use (though his main rival, Hetman Pavlo Teteria of Right-bank Ukraine still called Poland a "common mother" of the Cossack Hetmanate). Notably, Bohdan Khmelnytsky himself was often called the "father of the fatherland", clearly demonstrating that Ukraine primarily referred to the territory of the Cossack Hetmanate. While Ukraine became widely recognised as the fatherland by many, among them the hetmans Petro Doroshenko and Mykhailo Khanenko, Rus' or Ruthenia was also sometimes called the fatherland, rather than Ukraine.

Mazepa himself was no exception to this new trend. By the turn of the 1700s, his circulars often spoke of a distinct "Little Russian fatherland", while he himself was sometimes also called the "father of the fatherland" (that is, the Hetmanate). After Mazepa's defection to the Swedes in 1708, however, Peter I – who had not frequently used the term before – positioned himself as champion and defender of "Little Russia", while labelling Mazepa a traitor who wished to restore Polish subjugation.

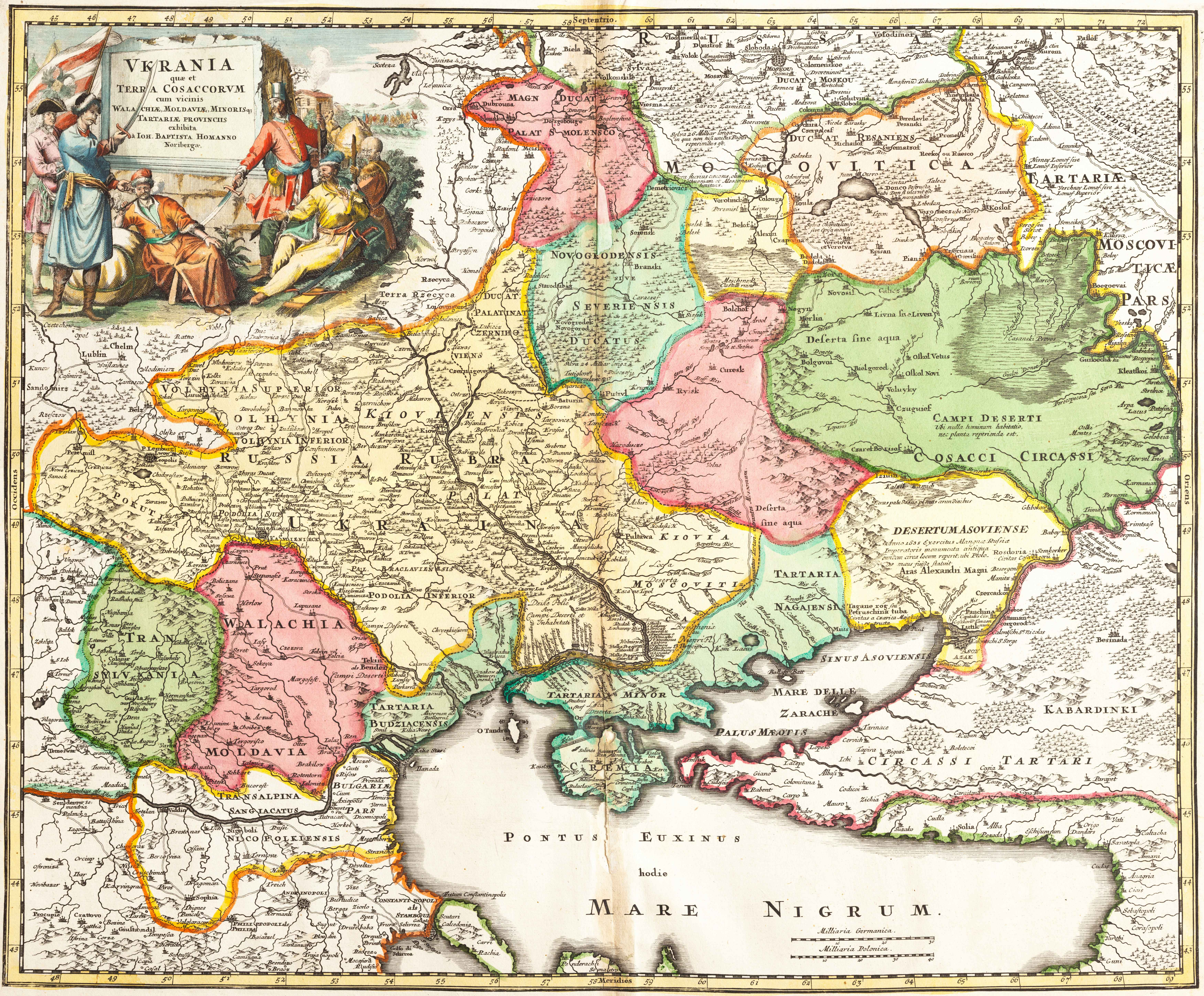
A map depicting "Ukraine, or the Land of Cossacks" by Johann Homann, made around the time of Mazepa's rule

Now locked in an ideological battle with Peter I, Mazepa called upon Ivan Skoropadsky to attack the "Muscovite" troops as a "true son of the fatherland"; in explaining his reasons for siding with the Swedes, he stated that he was acting for the welfare of "the common welfare of my father-land, poor unfortunate Ukraine". A significant innovation of Mazepa was framing the war against Russia as a battle between two wholly separate nations: the Little Russians (Ukrainians) and Great Russians (Muscovites).

Despite Mazepa's defeat at the Battle of Poltava, the usage of Ukraine as the name of a national fatherland distinct from Great Russia or Muscovy became only more popular in the years after his death, while the old terms which referred to a supposed All-Russian nation (such as Little Russia) declined; a 1728 drama dedicated to the new Hetman Danylo Apostol likened him to Khmelnytsky and called upon the viewers to celebrate Khmelnytsky's victories: "Do not weep, o Ukraine, cease to grieve; it is time to turn your sorrow into joy." Subsequently, the modern Ukrainian national identity developed largely out of the 18th-century Little Russian or Cossack Ukrainian identity, which Mazepa (and his close ally, Pylyp Orlyk) had done much to advance.

During his lifetime, Mazepa widely used an early form of the Ukrainian language for official matters, such as to issue orders or grant privileges. The linguist Michael Flier notes that for his highly private and personal love letters to Motria Kochubey, the hetman used "the most polished Ukrainian that the sixteen-year-old object of his affection could understand", suggesting Mazepa was most comfortable using that language, rather than Polish or Russian. For these reasons, modern historians generally refer to Mazepa as a Ukrainian figure; Tatiana Tairova-Yakovleva speaks of Mazepa as a "Ukrainian historical leader"; while Paul Robert Magocsi calls him "the Ukrainian hetman", as does Bushkovitch.

== Title and style ==
Mazepa's styles and titles as hetman are contained in his acts and treaties in following variations:

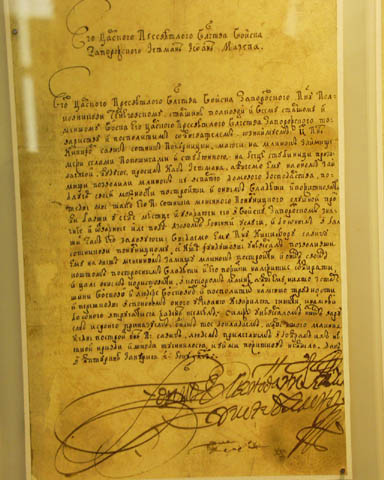
Text of a universal issued by Mazepa

=== Authentic sources ===
- Hetman of [Zaporozhian Host on/of] both sides of the Dnieper (гетманъ обойхъ сторонъ Днепра; Войска Запоро(ж/з)ского (c) обоихъ сторонъ Днепра гетман(ъ)) - first mentioned in a pledge made by the newly elected hetman under the terms of Kolomak Treaty of 1687, signifying his claims to both Left- and Right-bank Ukraine; also present in latter documents.
- Hetman with Their Illustrious Tsar's Majesty's Zaporozhian Host (гетманъ з Войскомъ их царского пресвѣтлого величества Запоро(з/жс)ким(ъ)) or Hetman of Their [Most Illustrious and Sovereign Lords'] Illustrious Tsar's Majesty's Zaporozhian Host ([Пресвѣтлѣйшихъ и державнѣйшихъ великихъ государей] ихъ царского пресвѣтлого величества Войска Запорозского гетманъ) - used by Mazepa under the joint rule of Peter I and Ivan V (1687–1696).
- Hetman of His [Most Illustrious and Sovereign Lord's] Illustrious Tsar's Majesty's Zaporozhian Host ([Пресвѣтлѣйшого и державнѣйшого великого государя] его царского пресвѣтлого величества Войска Запороз(с/жс)кого гетманъ) - under one-person rule of Peter I (after 1696).
- Hetman of His [Illustrious and Most Sovereign Lord's] Illustrious Tsar's Majesty's Zaporozhian Host and Knight [of the Glorious Order of the Holy Apostle Andrew] ([Пресвѣтлѣйшого и державнѣйшого великого государя] его царского пресвѣтлого величества Войска Запорожского гетманъ и [славного чина святого апостола Андрея] кавалер(ъ)) - after being awarded with the Order of St. Andrew in 1704.
- Hetman of His Illustrious and Most Sovereign Lord's (and) Tsar's Majesty's Zaporozhian Hosts and Knight of the Glorious Order of the Holy Apostle Andrew and White Eagle (Пресвѣтлѣйшого и державнѣйшого великого государя его царского величества Войскъ Запорожскихъ гетманъ и славного чина святого апостола Андрея и Бѣлого Орла кавалер(ъ)) - after being awarded with the Order of the White Eagle and attaching Right-bank Ukraine to the Hetmanate in 1705.

=== Dubious sources ===
- Prince of Ukraine (князь України) - supposedly contained in the 1708 treaty between Charles XII and the Cossack Hetmanate as claimed in a 1925 article by Ilko Borshchak.

== Legacy ==
=== Political legacy ===
Mazepa's decision to abandon his allegiance to the Russian Empire was considered treason by the Russian Tsar and a violation of the Treaty of Pereyaslav. However, others argue that it was Imperial Russia who broke the treaty by not even trying to protect the Cossack homeland during busy fighting abroad, while Ukrainian peasants were complaining about the conduct of local Muscovite troops. Many Cossacks had died while building Saint Petersburg, and the Tsar planned to deploy Cossack troops far from their homeland.

According to Russian historian Tatiana Tairova-Yakovleva, Mazepa had little chance of remaining in power if he had not risen up against Peter I, as the tsar's imperial ambitions envisioned the destruction of Ukrainian Cossack autonomy. In the aftermath of the Battle of Poltava, the Hetmanate was deprived of much of its independence, although it formally remained an autonomous entity. Its final demise took place in 1764, under the rule of Catherine the Great, who transformed the territory formerly ruled by hetmans of Ukrainian Cossacks into the Little Russia Governorate.

The French historian Claude Nordmann argues that Mazepa's decision to side with Charles XII ultimately doomed Ukraine by weakening its autonomy and further solidifying Russia's control.

The image of Mazepa as a disgraceful traitor persisted throughout Russian and Soviet history. The Russian Orthodox Church anathemaised and excommunicated Mazepa for political reasons. Until 1869, his name was even added to the list of traitors publicly cursed in Russian churches during the Feast of Orthodoxy service, along with Pugachev, Razin and False Dmitry I. The term Mazepintsi came to be used in Russia and the Soviet Union as a reference for people promoting disloyalty to authorities and separatism.

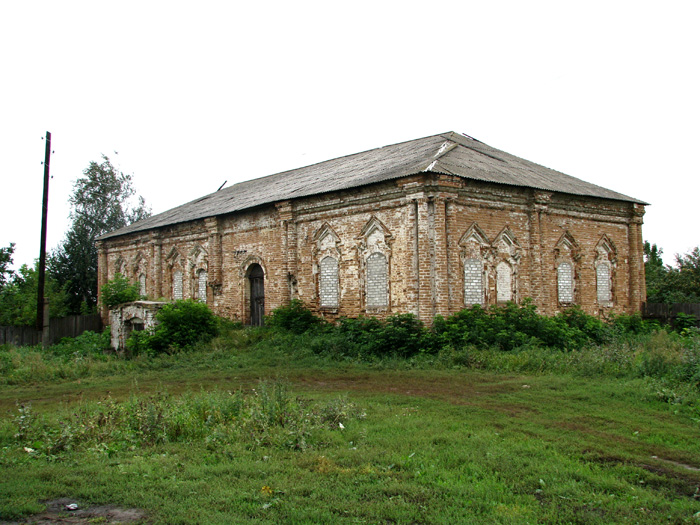
Abandoned residence of Mazepa in Ivanovskoye, Rylsky District

==== Russian and Soviet historiography ====
Historians of the Russian imperial era, including Dmitri Bantysh-Kamensky, Sergey Solovyov and Vasily Klyuchevsky considered Mazepa to be a traitor for his alliance with Charles XII of Sweden. However, some Russian historians of émigré background later changed that view, seeing Mazepa's decision as justified by the wish to preserve his country's autonomy.

A positive view of Mazepa was taboo in the Soviet Union and considered as a sign of "Ukrainian bourgeois nationalism". In the 1971 Soviet Encyclopedia on the History of Ukraine Mazepa was characterized as a "traitor of the Ukrainian people", and the 1979 History of the Ukrainian SSR referred to his name as a "symbol of treachery and betrayal". During the years of Perestroika, however, many historical works saw light that viewed Mazepa differently.

==== Early Ukrainian historiography ====
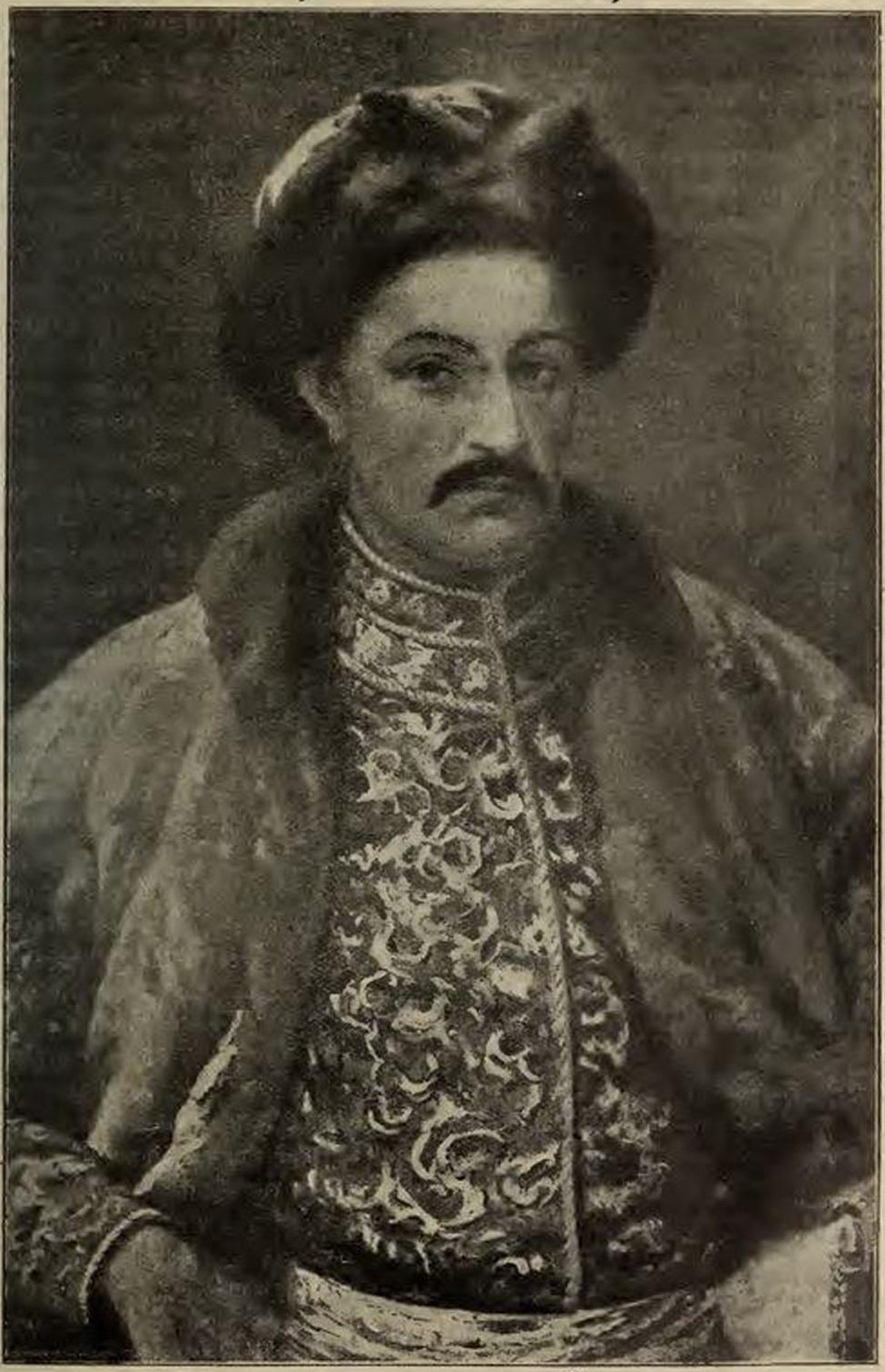
Portrait of Mazepa from the History of Ukraine-Rus by Mykola Arkas, 1912

Ukrainian historians initially had a predominantly unfavourable view on Mazepa, considering his policies and decisions to have been influenced by interests of the Cossack elite, and not of the nation as a whole. Among those Ukrainian authors who saw Mazepa as a traitor were Mykola Kostomarov, Panteleimon Kulish, Oleksandr Lazarevskyi and Volodymyr Antonovych. However, starting from the late 19th century, a new generation of students of Ukrainian history started reassessing Mazepa's figure. Mykhailo Hrushevskyi, Viacheslav Lypynskyi, Dmytro Doroshenko, Oleksander Ohloblyn and some others recognized the hetman as a patriot of Ukraine, who attempted to obtain for his country independence from Moscow's rule. In the 20th century Mazepa was elevated by some historians and publicists, most prominently Dmytro Dontsov and Natalia Polonska-Vasylenko, as a symbol of struggle for Ukraine's independence.

==== Independent Ukraine ====
After Ukraine's independence in 1991, Mazepa became increasingly seen in a positive light, as a great statesman who attempted to defend Ukrainian autonomy and interests. This is perhaps best evidenced by the 10 hryvnia bill featuring a portrait of Mazepa. This positive or revisionist view, however, is disputed by pro-Russian factions. Russia has repeatedly condemned Ukraine for honoring the figure of Ivan Mazepa. In an April 2009 survey by the Research & Branding Group, 30 percent of the population of Ukraine viewed Mazepa as "a man who fought for the independence of Ukraine", while 28 percent viewed him "as a turncoat who joined the enemy's ranks".

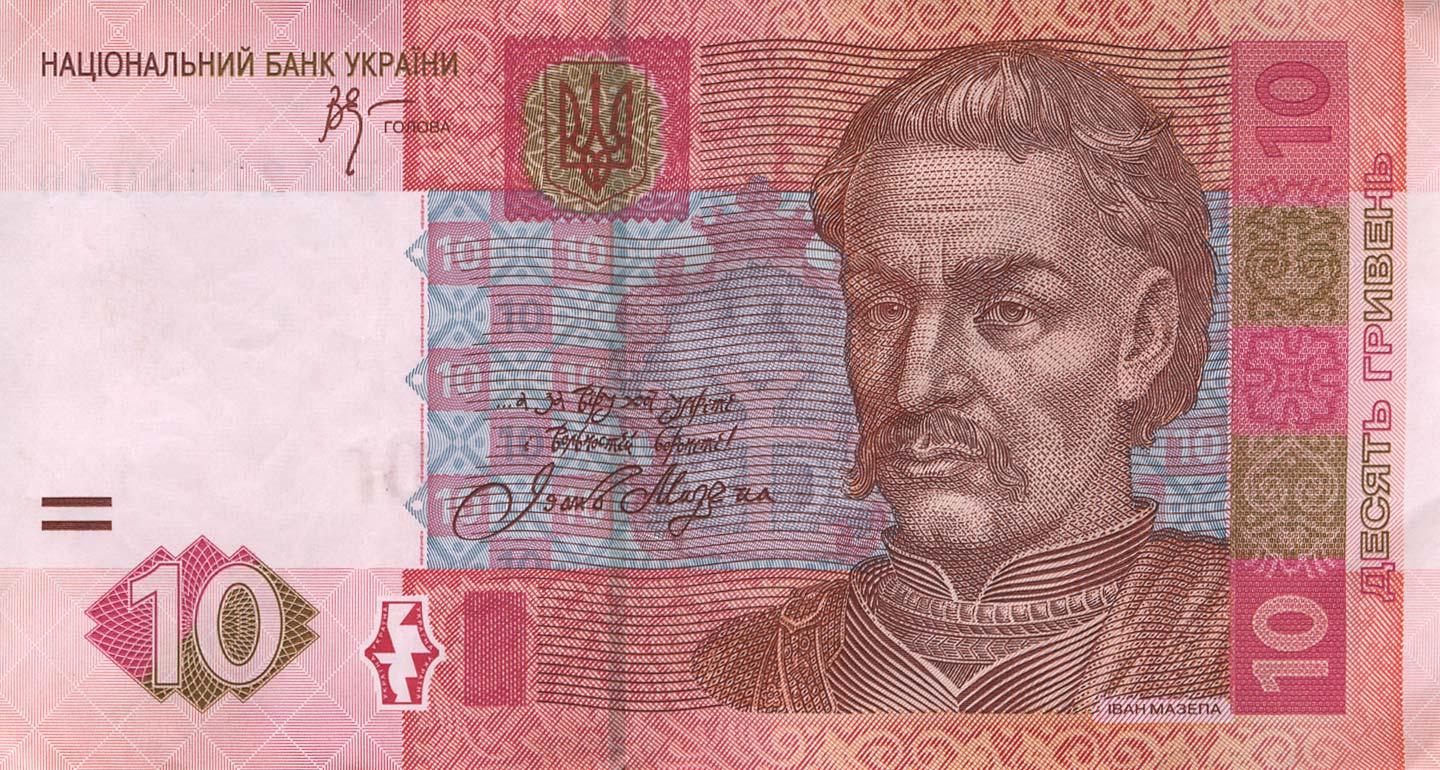
₴10 banknote depicting Ivan Mazepa

During an event in Mazepyntsi to mark the 370th birthday (20 March 2009) of Hetman Mazepa, the president of Ukraine Viktor Yushchenko called for the myth about the alleged treason of Mazepa to be dispelled. According to Yushchenko, the hetman wanted to create an independent Ukraine, and architecture thrived in Ukraine under Mazepa's rule: "Ukraine was reviving as the country of European cultural traditions". The same day, around 100 people held a protest in Simferopol against the marking of the 370th birthday of Mazepa. In May 2009 the Russian foreign ministry stated in an answer to Ukraine's preparations to mark the 300th anniversary of the battle of Poltava and plans to erect a monument to Mazepa that those were attempts at an "artificial, far-fetched confrontation with Russia".

In 2009, Yushchenko instituted the Cross of Ivan Mazepa as an award for cultural achievement and service. In August 2009, a monument to the hetman, the work of the sculptor Giennadij Jerszow, was unveiled at Dytynets Park in Chernihiv. The opening was accompanied by clashes between the police and opponents of Mazepa.

After researching his genealogy in 2009, Viktor Yushchenko did not rule out that his family is connected with the family of Mazepa.

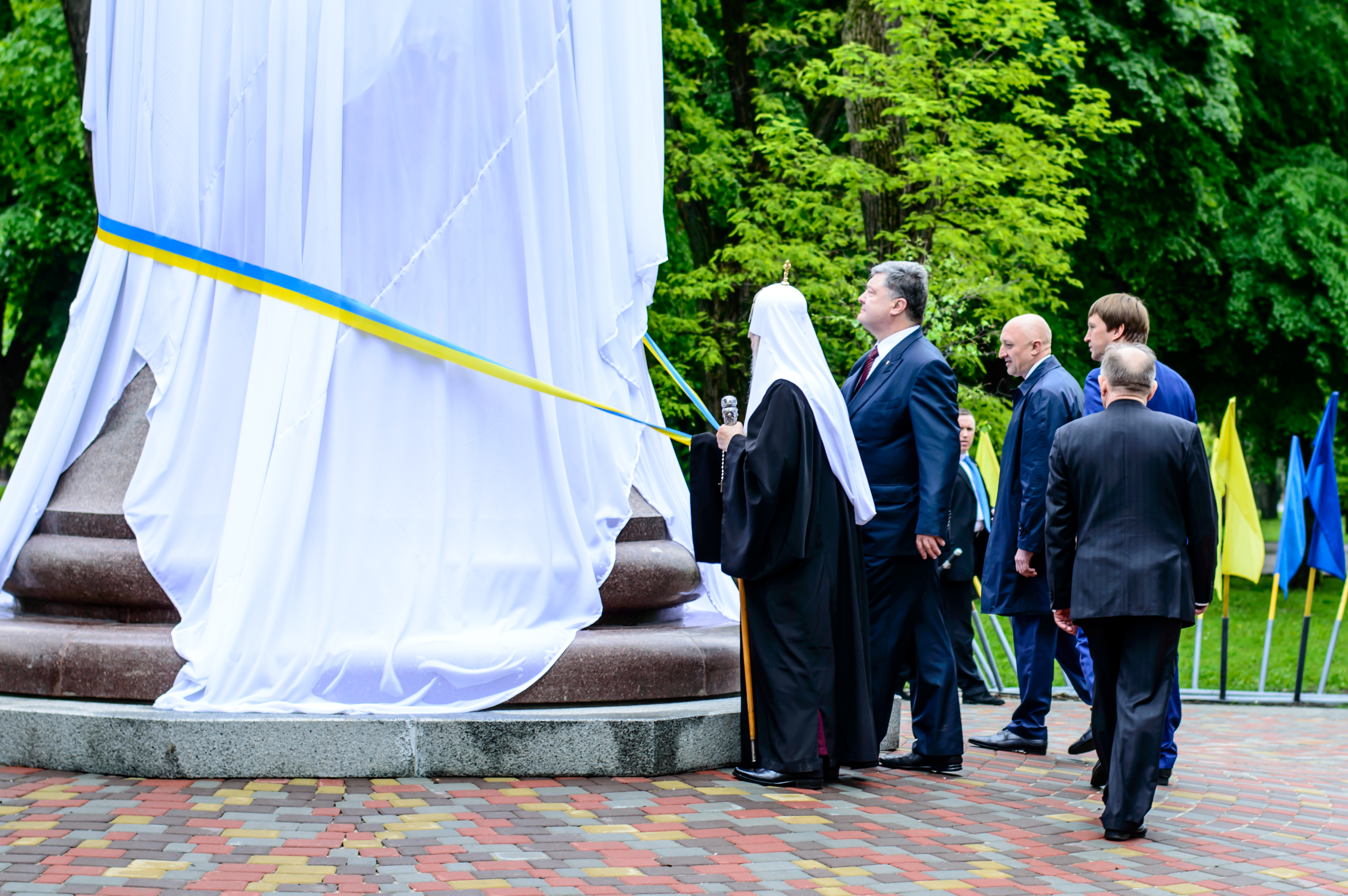
Unveiling of a monument to hetman Ivan Mazepa in Poltava by Ukrainian president Petro Poroshenko in 2016

In August 2009, Yushchenko decreed the resuming of a halted construction of an Ivan Mazepa monument in Poltava. A monument to Mazepa was to be erected on Slava Square in Kyiv in 2010 to fulfill a decree of Yushchenko. In May 2010 Kyiv city civil servants stated the city was ready to establish a monument as soon as the Cabinet of Ukraine would fund this project. According to them the situation was similar to other unrealised monuments such as the "Unification Monument" and a monument to Pylyp Orlyk who in 2010 were conceived in 2002 and 2003 but still not built in 2010. The monument to Orlyk was unveiled in June 2011, while on 14 October 2015 the Mazepa monument was transported and put on display in Poltava. The Poltava City Council on 25 February 2016 voted in favor of the monument. On 6 May 2016 President Petro Poroshenko unveiled the Mazepa monument in Poltava.

The name of the part of Ivan Mazepa Street in Kyiv, which runs past the Pechersk Lavra, was changed to Lavrska Street in July 2010. The move was met with protests. An exhibition dedicated to Mazepa is active in the Hetmanship Museum in Kyiv.

Mazepa's portrait is found on the ₴10 (Ukrainian currency) bill. Mazepynka, a type of military headwear worn by soldiers of the Ukrainian Sich Riflemen, Galician Army, Ukrainian Insurgent Army and modern-day Armed Forces of Ukraine (since 2015) was named after hetman Ivan Mazepa.

A church bell originally ordered by Mazepa for a church in his capital Baturyn was discovered in 2015 at the Saint Nicholas Cathedral in the Russian city of Orenburg. In 2018 a representative of the Patriarch of Constantinople proclaimed the anathema on Mazepa to be uncanonical, as it had been laid out of political grounds. During his visit to Mazepa's former capital of Baturyn in 2019, Ukrainian president Petro Poroshenko compared the hetman to George Washington, Simon Bolivar and Mahatma Gandhi. A major exhibition dedicated to Mazepa and his era opened in 2025 in Kyiv Pechersk Lavra.

In 2020 President Volodymyr Zelenskyy gave the 54th Mechanized Brigade of the Ukrainian Army the honorary title of "Ivan Mazepa". In 2022 Zelenskyy named a Ukrainian Navy Ada-class corvette after Mazepa.

On 28 June 2026, a bust of Mazepa was unveiled on the grounds of the Kyiv Pechersk Lavra. Ukrainian president Volodymyr Zelenskyy who was speaking at the unveiling, proclaimed that Ukraine was correcting another historical injustice while calling Mazepa an outstanding statesman, a patron of the arts, the leader of the Cossack state and pointed out how the monastery flourished under his care. He also proposed building a monument to Mazepa on the spot where Lenin's statue previously stood on Taras Shevchenko Boulevard before being tore down saying "I am sure that where Lenin fell, there Mazepa will stand firmly".

==== In other countries ====
In Galați (Romania), Mazepa is remembered in the name of two central neighbourhoods (Mazepa I and II) and with a statue in a park on Basarabiei street.

In 1855, the town of Mazeppa, Minnesota, was named by way of Byron's poem.

=== Cultural legacy ===
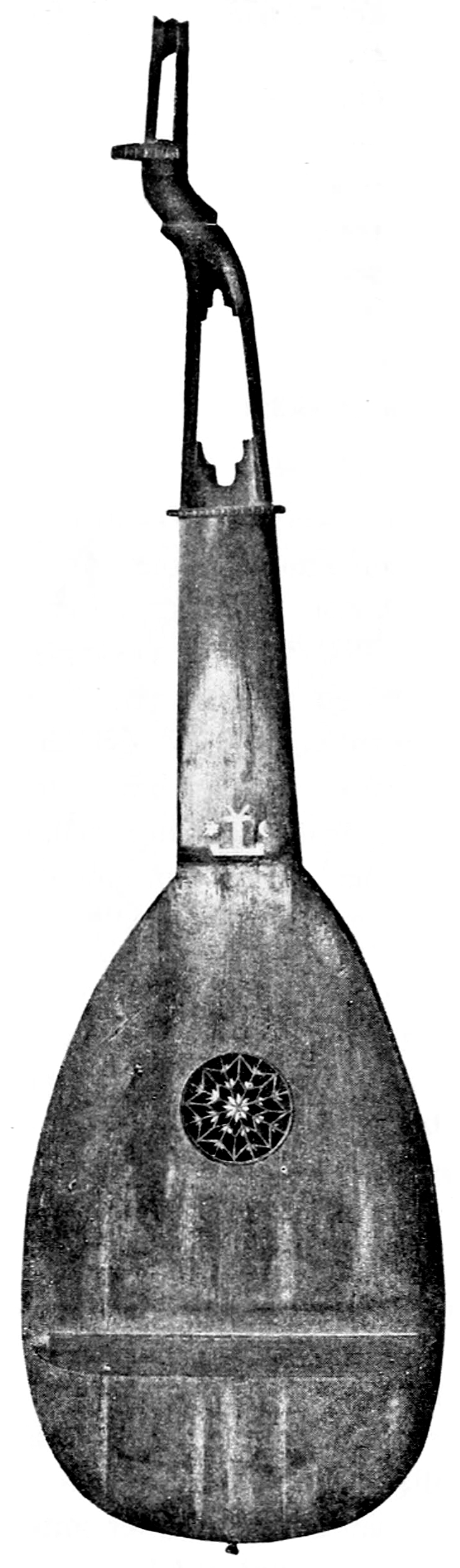
A torban that shows the Mazepa coat-of-arms, lost during the Second World War

==== Literary works attributed to Mazepa ====
In an addition to being a politician and statesman, Mazepa is also known to have created works of literature. Writings attributed to Mazepa are his letters to Motria, the daughter of Vasyl Kochubey, as well as a short verse in a mix of Old Ukrainian and Polish signed with the hetman's name, which was reportedly found in a prayer book stored at a monastery near Putyvl in 1770. Additionally, the poem Duma (also known by its incipit "Everyone desires peace"), which became a popular Ukrainian folk song, is traditionally ascribed to Mazepa, although it is doubtful that the poem in its present form could have been composed by the hetman. According to Oleksander Ohloblyn, the poem was created circa 1698 and preserved in the notes from the 1708 trial of Vasyl Kochubey, who used it to prove his accusation of treason against the hetman. The author of Duma laments the state of Ukrainian lands during the Ruin, which led to the country's division between Poland, Moscow and the Ottomans, and calls on his compatriots to unite and fight against their common enemies. It represents an important document of Ukrainian political thought of that era.

==== Works of art dedicated to Mazepa ====
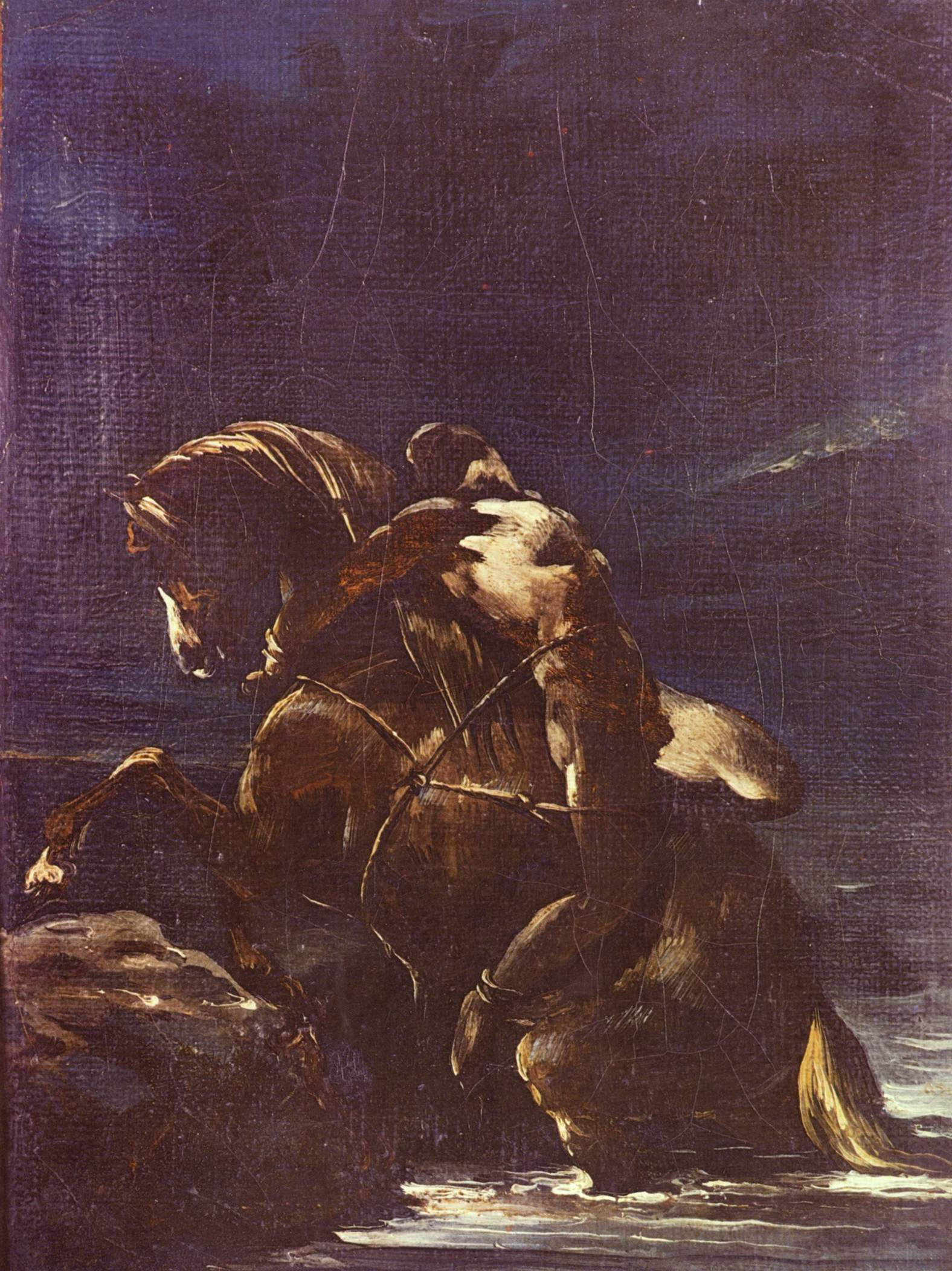
Mazeppa by Théodore Géricault, based on an episode in Byron's poem when the young Mazeppa is punished by being tied to a wild horse

The historical events of Mazepa's life have inspired many literary and musical works:

- Lord Byron – Mazeppa, poem (1818)
- Alexander Pushkin – Poltava, poem (1828–1829)
- Victor Hugo – Mazeppa, poem (1829)
- Juliusz Słowacki – Mazeppa, drama (1840)
- Franz Liszt – Mazeppa, symphonic poem (1851); Transcendental Étude No. 4.
- Carlo Pedrotti – Mazeppa, opera, with libretto by Achille de Lauzieres (1861)
- Marie Grandval – Mazeppa, opera (1892)
- Pyotr Ilyich Tchaikovsky – Mazeppa, opera (1881–1883)
- Michael William Balfe – The Page, cantata (1861)
- Taras Shevchenko
- Kondraty Ryleyev – Voynarovsky, narrative poem about Mazepa and his nephew Andriy Voynarovsky (1825)
- A Ukrainian-language film by Yuri Ilyenko, loosely based on historical facts and called Molitva za hetmana Mazepu (A Prayer for Hetman Mazepa), was released in 2002.

== See also ==
- Ivan Mazepa's Hetman's Banner – One of three authentic Cossack banners in the world
- Ukrainian national revival – Mazepa's legacy of Ukrainian statehood contributed to this revival
- History of the Ruthenians – Often discusses or otherwise mentions Mazepa

== Bibliography ==
=== Books ===
- Pavlenko, Serhii (2018). Іван Мазепа. Прижиттєві зображення гетьмана та його наближних [Ivan Mazepa. Contemporary depictions of the hetman and his kin]. Kyiv. ISBN 978-966-577-262-0.
- Manning, Clarence (1957). Hetman of Ukraine: Ivan Mazepa. New York: Bookman Associates.
- Tairova-Yakovleva, Tatiana (2020). Ivan Mazepa and the Russian Empire. McGill–Queen's University Press. ISBN 978-0-2280-0309-0.
- Tairova-Yakovleva, Tatiana (2007). Мазепа [Mazepa] (in Russian). Moscow: Molodaya Gvardiya (publisher). ISBN 978-5-235-02966-8.
- Yakovenko, Natalia (2006). Нарис історії середньовічної та ранньомодерної України [An Outline History of Medieval and Early Modern Ukraine] (in Ukrainian) (3rd ed.). Kyiv: Krytyka. ISBN 966-7679-82-9.
- Mykhailo Hrushevsky, Illustrated history of Ukraine. "BAO". Donetsk, 2003. ISBN 966-548-571-7
- Orest Subtelny, The Mazepists: Ukrainian Separatism in the Early Eighteenth Century (1981).
- Nordmann, Claude (1958). Charles XII et l'Ukraine de Mazepa [Charles XII and Mazepa's Ukraine] (in French). Librairie générale de droit et de jurisprudence. OCLC 4224523.
- Pavlenko, Serhii (2003). Іван Мазепа [Ivan Mazepa] (in Ukrainian). Kyiv: Alternatyvy. ISBN 966-7217-84-1.
- Magocsi, Paul Robert (2010). A History of Ukraine: The Land and Its Peoples (2nd ed.). University of Toronto Press. ISBN 978-1-4426-1021-7.
- Korniyenko, Oleh (2008). "Сумський полк та події сіверсько-слобожанського походу Карла ХІІ" [Sumy Regiment and the Events of the Severian-Sloboda Ukraine Campaign of Karl XII]. In Smoliy, Valeriy (ed.). Гетьман Іван Мазепа: постать, оточення, епоха [Hetman Ivan Mazepa: Person, Surroundings, Era] (in Ukrainian). Kyiv. ISBN 978-966-02-5042-0.
- Chukhlib, Taras (2008). "Український гетьманат у Великій Північній війні 1700–1721 рр.: проблеми міжнародного та воєнно-політичного становища" [The Ukrainian Hetmanate during the Great Northern War of 1700-1721: international and military-political issues]. In Smoliy, Valeriy (ed.). Гетьман Іван Мазепа: постать, оточення, епоха [Hetman Ivan Mazepa: Person, Surroundings, Era] (in Ukrainian). Kyiv. ISBN 978-966-02-5042-0.
- Kovalevska, Olha (2008). "Дослідження іконографії Івана Мазепи за матеріалами листування Т. Цяловської та С. Білоконя" [A study of the iconography of Ivan Mazepa according to the letters of T. Tsialovska and S. Bilokin]. In Smoliy, Valeriy (ed.). Гетьман Іван Мазепа: постать, оточення, епоха [Hetman Ivan Mazepa: Person, Surroundings, Era] (in Ukrainian). Kyiv. ISBN 978-966-02-5042-0.
- Plokhy, Serhii (2012). "Poltava: The Battle That Never Ends". In Plokhy, Serhii (ed.). Poltava 1709: The Battle and the Myth. Harvard University Press. ISBN 978-1932650099.
- Plokhy, Serhii (2006). The Origins of the Slavic Nations: Premodern Identities in Russia, Ukraine and Belarus. Cambridge University Press. ISBN 978-0-511-24704-0.
- Plokhy, Serhii (2023). ""In the Name of the Beloved Fatherland": The Loyalty and Treason of Ivan Mazepa". In Kohut, Zenon (ed.). Eighteenth-Century Ukraine: New Perspectives on Social, Cultural, and Intellectual History. McGill–Queen's University Press. ISBN 978-0-2280-1743-1.
- Ohloblyn, Olexander (1960). Гетьман Іван Мазепа та його доба [Hetman Ivan Mazepa and His Era] (in Ukrainian). New York: Organization for Defense of Four Freedoms for Ukraine.

=== Journals ===
- Koropeckyj, Roman (1990). "The Slap, the Feral Child, and the Steed: Pasek Settles Accounts with Mazepa" (PDF). Harvard Ukrainian Studies. 14 (3/4): 415–426.
- Shumylo, Serhii (2016). "Нове джерело до біографії І. Мазепи та історії зв'язків української козацької старшини з центром православного чернецтва на Афоні" [A new source of the biography of Ivan Mazepa and the history of the relationship of the Cossack starshyna with the centre of Orthodox monasticism on Athos]. Сіверянський Літопис [Severian Chronicle] (in Ukrainian). 6 (132). ISSN 2518-7430.
- Thomas M. Prymak, "Voltaire on Mazepa and Early Eighteenth Century Ukraine," Canadian Journal of History, XLVII, 2 (2012), 259–83.
- Thomas M. Prymak, "The Cossack Hetman: Ivan Mazepa in History and Legend from Peter to Pushkin," The Historian, LXXVI, 2 (2014), 237–77.
- Thomas M. Prymak, “Who Betrayed Whom? Or, Who remained Loyal to What? Tsar Peter vs. Hetman Mazepa,” Eighteenth-Century Studies, LV, 3 (2022), 359–76.
