= Hetman (film) =

2015 Ukrainian historical drama film by Valeriy Yamburskyi

- Promotional poster
- Directed by: Valeriy Yamburskyi
- Written by: Viktor Veretennikov
- Produced by: Viktor Veretennikov
- Cinematography: Volodymyr Halytskyi
- Music by: Andriy Taborko
- Distributed by: Zlahpda studio Darzini studio
- Release date: 29 October 2015
- Running time: 120 minutes
- Languages: Polish; Ukrainian; Crimean Tatar; Russian; English subtitles
- Budget: 12 million hryvnias

Hetman (Ukrainian: «Гетьман», Russian: «Гетман») is a Ukrainian historical film directed by Valery Yamburskyi telling about the tragic love of Bohdan Khmelnytsky for a young Polish woman, Helena Czaplińska.

== Plot ==
When Polish noblet Daniel Czapliński attacked Bohdan Khmelnytsky’s farm in Subotiv, kidnapped his wife and beat his little son Tymish, the Ukrainian Cossacks, led by Bohdan, begin their uprising.

== Starring ==
- Konstyantyn Linartovych - as Bogdan Khmelnytskyi, hetman of Ukraine
- Fatima Horbenko - as Helena Czaplińska
- Serhiy Kalantay - as Daniel Czapliński
- Stanislav Lozovskyi - asTymish Khmelnitsky, Bogdan's son
- Mikhaylo Holubovych - as Crimean Tatar Khan
- Vladyslav Mamchur - as Teddy, Polish spy
- Vladyslav Yambursky - as Petro Doroshenko, Cossack commander

== Critical reception ==
A number of Ukrainian critics spoke poorly of the film, noting the “terrible Polish” of some characters

== Awards ==
In 2016, the film received an award in the category “Best Feature Film 2015”
