= Czapliński =

Czapliński, feminine: Czaplińska is a Polish surname.

- Daniel Czapliński (died after 1663), deputy starosta of Chyhyryn
- Helena Czaplińska (died 1651), Second wife of Bohdan Khmelnytsky
- Przemysław Czapliński (born 1962), literary scholar
- Stanisław Czapliński (died 1618)
- Władysław Czapliński (1905–1981)
