= Hetman of the Zaporizhian Cossacks =

Historical term

The phrase Hetman of the Zaporizhian Cossacks encompasses various titles and positions of the Cossacks in the history of Ukraine.

- "Hetman of His Royal Grace's Zaporizhian Host" (Note: Old Ukrainian: Гетман Войска Єго Королевскои Милости Запорозкого, Hetman of His Royal Grace's Zaporozhian Host; Ukrainian: Гетьман Війська Запорозького, romanized: Hetman Viiska Zaporozkoho).) was the formal title of the hetmans in the military service of the Polish–Lithuanian Commonwealth from 1572 to 1638, selected from the senior officers (starshyna) of the Registered Cossacks (Town Cossacks) in western, central and northern Ukraine;
- Hetman of the Zaporizhian Host refers to the head of state of the Cossack Hetmanate, the Ukrainian state of 1648–1764;
- Kish otamans of the Sich Cossacks in southern Ukraine from the 1620s to 1775, which until the late 17th century were also interchangeably called "hetmans";
- Hetman of all Ukraine, a title claimed by Pavlo Skoropadsky for a few months in 1918.

With the creation of the Registered Cossacks units in 1572, their leading officers were officially referred to as "Senior of His Royal Grace's Zaporozhian Host". (Note: Ukrainian: старший його Королівської Милості Війська Запорозького, Starshyi Yoho Korolivskoi Mylosti Viiska Zaporozkoho; Polish: starszy Wojska J.K.Mci Zaporoskiego).) The Commonwealth created the Cossack Registry in competition with the formations of the unregistered Zaporizhian Cossacks (colloquially known as the "Zaporizhian Host") living in the Siches of southern Ukraine. According to the Encyclopedia of Ukraine, "The Commonwealth government officially named the registered Cossacks the Zaporozhian Army to underscore the fact that it considered the actual Zaporozhian Host a legal nonentity." For a brief period between the 1625 Treaty of Kurukove and the 1638 Ordinance of the Zaporizhian Host, the Registered Cossacks had the right to elect their own hetman, although he had to be approved by the king. After the 1637–1638 Cossack uprisings were suppressed, the post of hetman was abolished and replaced by a government commissioner. However, the Khmelnytsky Uprising of 1648 saw the combined forces of Registered (Town) and unregistered (Sich) Cossacks elect Bohdan Khmelnytsky as "Hetman of the Zaporizhian Host", without reference to "His Royal Grace"; this would become the title of the head of state of the Cossack Hetmanate ever since.

== Full title ==
Flag of Bohdan Khmelnytsky. Bohdan (Б) Khmelnytsky (Х), hetman (Г) of Host (В) of Zaporozhia (З) and of His (Е) Royal (К) Majesty (МЛС) of Rzecz Pospolita.

- Hetman with [His Tsar's / Royal Majesty's] Zaporozhian Host (Ruthenian: гетман(ъ) з(ъ) Войскомъ [его царского величества / его королевской милости] Запоро(жс/з)кимъ; Polish: Hetman z Wojskiem [Jego Królewskiej Mości / Jego Carskiego Wieliczestwa] Zaporoskim; Middle Russian: гетман с Воиском [его королевской милости] Запорожским) - used by 17th-century hetmans including Bohdan Khmelnytsky, Yurii Khmelnytsky, Ivan Vyhovsky, Petro Doroshenko, Ivan Samoilovych and during the early rule of Ivan Mazepa; the monarch's title was altered depending on the current political allegiance of the Cossack host; (Note: The honorific Their Tsar's Majesty (их(ъ) / іх(ъ) царского величества) was used as part of the title during the joint rule of Peter I and Ivan V of Russia in 1682-1689.)
- Hetman of [His Royal Majesty's] Zaporozhian Host (Ruthenian: гетман Воиска [его кор[олевскои] милости] Запороз(с)кого; Russian: гетман Войска Запорожского) - used by Bohdan Khmelnytskyi before the Treaty of Pereyaslav.
- [His Tsar's Majesty's] Hetman of Zaporozhian Hosts [on both sides of the Dnieper] (Ruthenian: [его царского величества] гетманъ Войскъ Запоро(ж)скихъ [(с) обоихъ сторонъ Днепра]) or [His Tsar's Majesty's] Hetman of the Zaporozhian Host [on both sides of the Dnieper] (Ruthenian: [его царского величества] гетманъ Войска Запоро(ж/з)ского [(с) обоихъ сторонъ Днепра]) - titles used by Ivan Mazepa (1689-1709) and his successor Ivan Skoropadsky; (Note: The honorific Their Tsar's Majesty (их(ъ) / іх(ъ) царского величества) was used as part of the title during the joint rule of Peter I and Ivan V of Russia in 1682-1689.)
- Hetman of His / Her Imperial Majesty's Zaporozhian Host on both sides of the Dnieper (Old Ukrainian: Его / Εꙗ Імператорского вεличεства Воиска Запорожского ѡбоихъ сторонъ Днѣпра Гεтманъ) - used by Danylo Apostol (1727-1734).
- Hetman of Her Imperial Majesty's Little Russia on both sides of the Dnieper and (of) Zaporozhian Hosts (Old Ukrainian: Ея Императорскаго Величества Малой Россіи обоихъ сторонъ Днѣпра и войскъ Запорожскихъ Гεтманъ) - used by Kyrylo Rozumovsky (1750-1764).

== Background ==
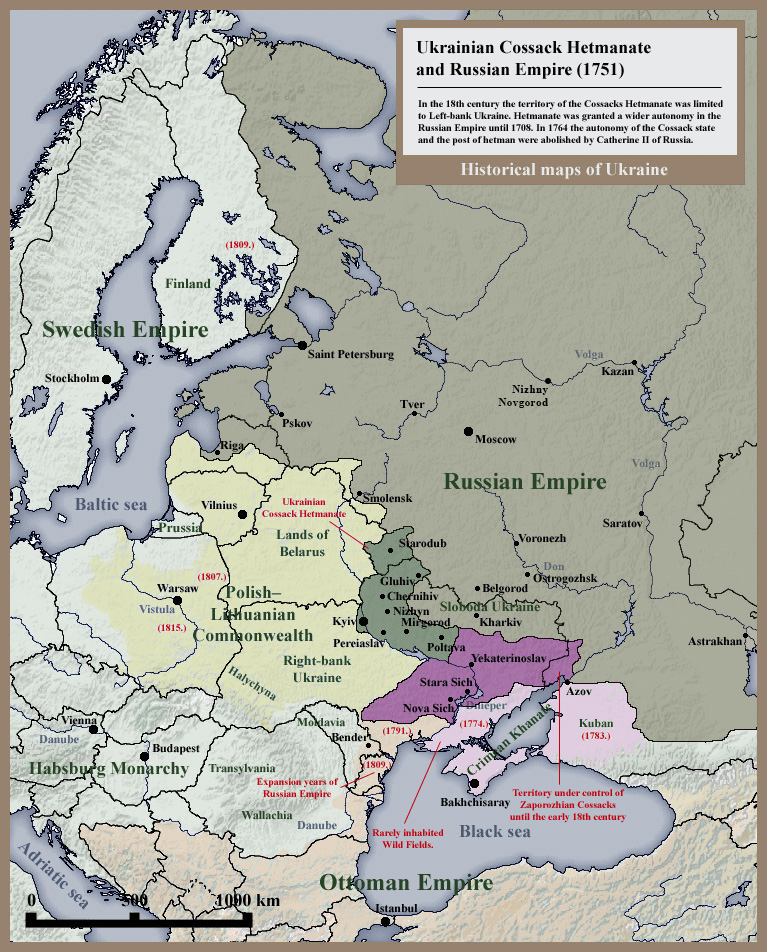
Historical map of Cossack Hetmanate and territory of Zaporozhian Cossacks under rule of Russian Empire (1751).

=== Starosta predecessors ===
A starosta (administrator, literally "elder") governed a starostwo, subordinate to a voivode. Several Polish starostas such as Lanckoroński, Daszkiewicz and Vyshnevetsky, who also led their own Cossack formations in Polish service in the early 16th century, have been retroactively considered hetmans of the Registered Cossacks. According to Mykhailo Hrushevsky they were not really considered as hetmans, at least by their contemporaries. Przecław Lanckoroński (Predslav Lyantskoronsky; 1506–1512, died 1531) was a starosta of Khmilnyk. Although later historians have often retroactively identified him as the first or second "hetman" or "otaman" of the Cossacks in service of Poland, the Cossack registry would not be formally established until 1572, and he has faced historiographic competition from Dashkevych and Vyshnevetsky as the "first". Ostap Dashkevych (1506–1536) was a starosta in charge of a defense force approved by the Sejm near Cherkasy. Dashkevych offered to create a defense force on the banks of the Lower Dnieper, an important step towards the establishment of the Registered Cossacks in 1572. For similar reasons as Lanckoroński and Vyshnevetsky, he has therefore sometimes been retroactively considered the first or second hetman or otaman of the Cossacks. Dmytro Vyshnevetsky (1550–1564) was a starosta of Cherkasy and Kaniv, who established a Cossack garrison at Khortytsia Castle in the 1550s. His characterisation as the "first Cossack hetman" (championed by Hrushevsky amongst others) has been challenged; it enjoys some, but not universal support amongst historians.

=== Kish otamans ===
The commanders of Zaporozhian Host units (the Kish), often considered as hetmans (and sometimes named as such in primary sources), in fact served the function since the 1620s known as Kish otaman, a term which by the end of the 17th century completely replaced "hetman".

== Hetmans of the Registered Cossacks (1572–1638) ==
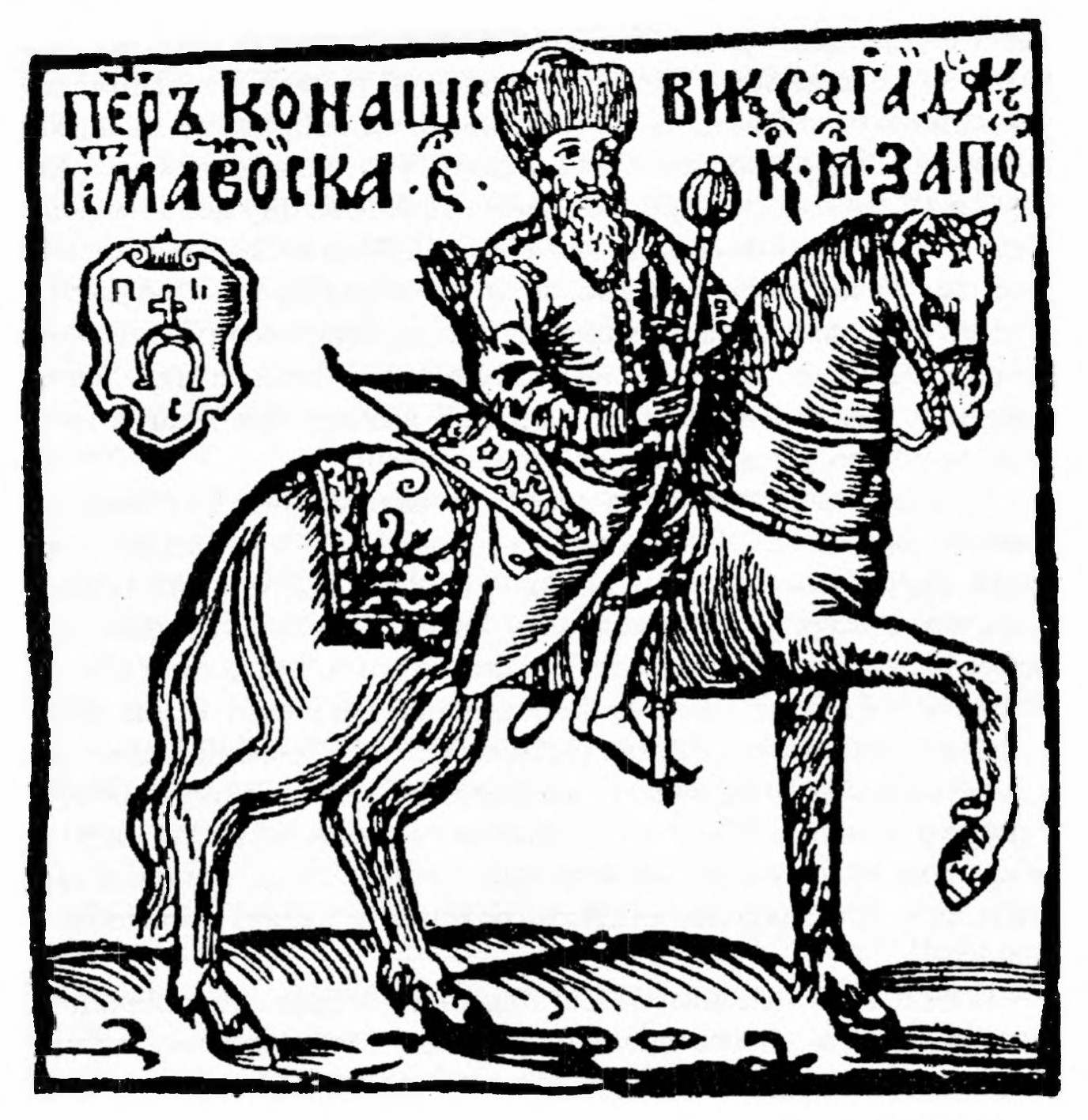
"Petro Konashevych-Sahaidachny, Hetman of H[is] R[oyal] G[race]'s Zapo[rizhian] Host." (Note: Old Ukrainian: Пе[т]ръ Конашевич–Сага[й]дач[ний]. Гі[т]ма[н] Во[й]ска Є[го] К[оролевскои] М[илости] Запо[розкого], romanized: Pe[t]rŭ Konashevych-Saha[i]dach[ny]. Hi[t]ma[n] Vo[j]ska Ye[ho] K[orolevskoj] M[ylosty] Zapo[rozkoho].) 1622 engraving.

The Registered Cossacks were formally established in 1572. From 1572 onwards, "hetman" was the unofficial title of commanders of the Registered Cossack Army of the Polish–Lithuanian Commonwealth, which officially called them starszy ("senior" or "elder"). From 1625, Registered Cossacks were allowed to elect their own hetmans, subject to approval by the king. However, after suppressing the 1637–1638 Cossack uprisings, the Registered Cossack hetmanship in the Commonwealth was abolished and replaced by a government commissioner.

The Hetman (official title in Polish: starszy, "Senior"; Ukrainian: старший, starshyj) was selected from the officers of the Registered Cossacks to lead a Commonwealth army during one campaign season (similar to a похідний отаман, pokhidny otaman, 'campaign otaman'). Later, their tenure would be longer than a single season. Usually, they were appointed by the Grand (Crown) or Field Hetmans of the Polish–Lithuanian Commonwealth. In times of Cossack uprisings, rebel Registered or unregistered Cossacks elected their own Hetmans. Bohdan Ruzhynsky was the first official Hetman of the Registered Cossacks (1575–1576), a member of the Volhynian nobility, and a leader who was sponsored by Moscow. Ivan Orishevsky is an example of someone who was appointed multiple times to serve as Hetman of the Registered Cossacks (1578–1582, 1584–1585, 1586–1587), as was Hryhoriy Loboda with interruptions between 1593 and 1596. Samiylo Kishka (1600–1602) managed to reinstate the rights of Cossacks in the Polish–Lithuanian Commonwealth. Yatsko Borodavka (Yakiv Borodavka-Neroda) was elected Hetman by rebel unregistered Cossacks in 1619; two years later, he was confirmed Hetman by a general council of both rebel Registered and unregistered Cossacks in June 1621, although he would soon be deposed after military setbacks and succeeded by Sahaidachny. Petro Konashevych-Sahaidachny, Hetman of the Registered Cossacks (1616–1622), led successful campaigns against the Crimean Khanate and the Ottoman Empire, aided the Polish army at Moscow in 1618 and at the Battle of Khotyn in 1621. He also saw Cossack interests in the independence of Ukraine from Poland. Ivan Sulyma (died 1635) is both mentioned as an elected Kish otaman in the Zaporizhian Sich (no date), and a Hetman of the unregistered Cossacks in 1628. Pavlo Pavliuk (Mikhnovych) was a Colonel of the Registered Cossacks who was elected Hetman by rebel Zaporizhian Cossacks in July 1637, and thus became the leader of the Pavliuk uprising (July–December 1637).

== Cossack Hetmanate ==
Hetman of the Zaporozhian Host
- Гетьман Війська Запорозького
- State flag

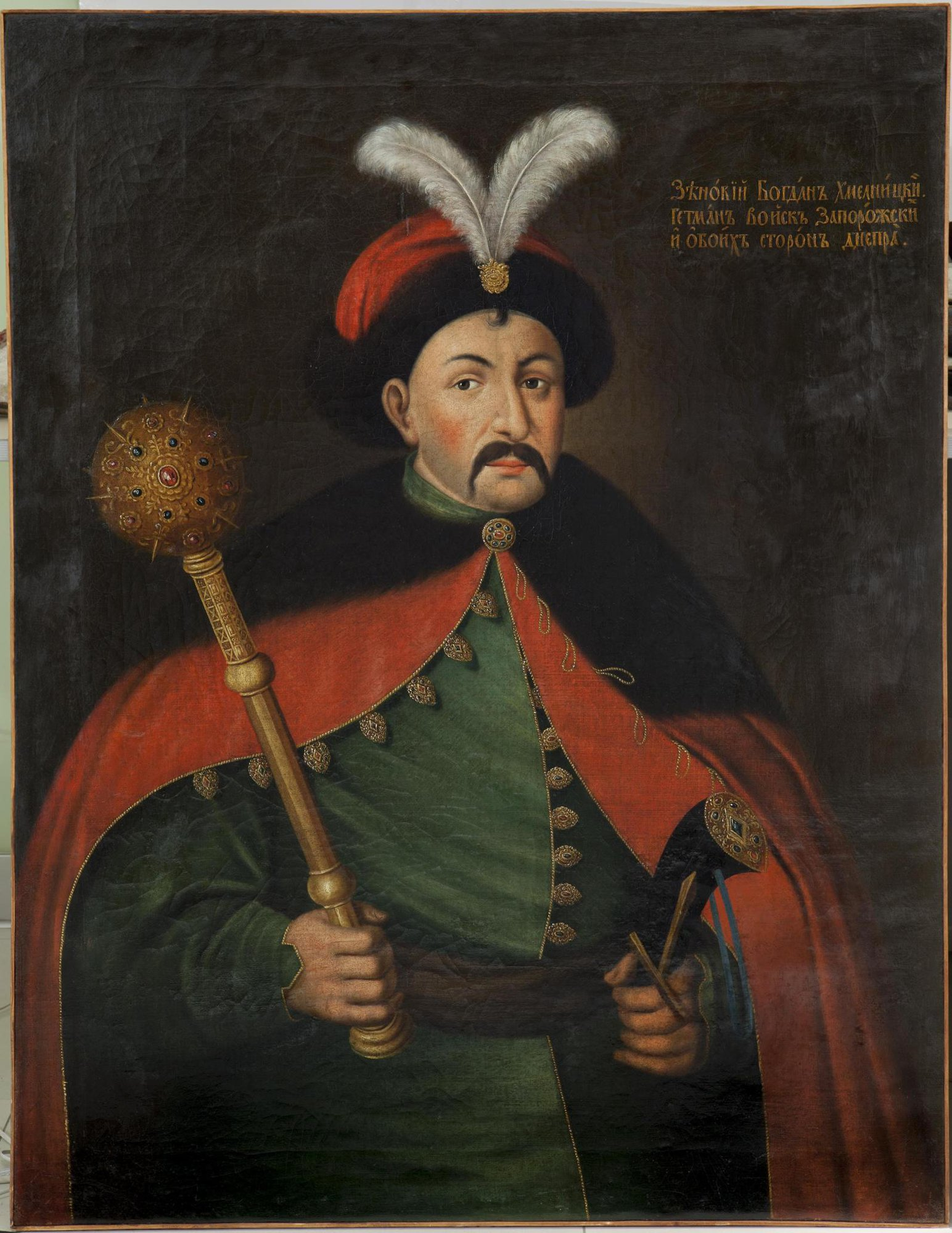
- Most renowned and first official hetman of the Zaporizhian Host, Bohdan Khmelnytsky
- Style: His Serene Highness (Його Ясновельможність)
- Residence: Chyhyryn (originally); Baturyn (1669-1708); Hlukhiv (after 1708)
- Appointer: General Military Council
- Formation: 26 January 1648
- First holder: Bohdan Khmelnytsky
- Final holder: Kirill Razumovski
- Abolished: 17 November 1764

The position was established by Bohdan Khmelnytsky during the Cossack Hetmanate in the mid 17th century. During that period, the office was electoral. All elections, except for the first one, took place in the Senior Council in Chyhyryn, which, until 1669, served as the capital of the Hetmanate.

After the Pereiaslav Agreement of 1654, several senior Cossacks sided with the Tsardom of Russia and, in 1663, they convened the Black Council of 1663 in Nizhyn, which elected Ivan Briukhovetsky as an alternative hetman, triggering what is known in history as the Ruin. Following the defeat of Petro Doroshenko in 1669, the title of hetman was adopted by the pro-Russian elected hetmans, with their residence in Baturyn. In the course of the Great Northern War, one of them, Ivan Mazepa, decided to revolt against Russian rule in 1708, which later drew terrible consequences for the Cossack Hetmanate as well as the Zaporozhian Host. The administration was moved to Hlukhiv, where Mazepa was publicly executed in effigy and anathema was declared upon him by the Russian Orthodox Church.

By an edict of the Russian Governing Senate of 17 November 1764, the office was disestablished in the course of the expansion of Russian territory towards the Black Sea coast.

From the 1648 Khmelnytsky Uprising onwards, Hetman of the Zaporizhian Host was the title of the head of the Ukrainian Cossack state, the Cossack Hetmanate. Cossack hetmans were elected by the Cossack Rada (an early form of democracy), had limited powers in peacetime, but broad powers in wartime, and acted as supreme military commanders and executive leaders (by issuing administrative decrees).

After the split of Ukrainian territory along the Dnieper River by the Commonwealth-Tsardom Treaty of Andrusovo (1667), there was an introduction of dual leadership for each bank, or for each Ukraine of Dnieper (left and right). After 1667, there existed two different Cossack Hetmanates with two Hetmans: the Right-bank hetman was called "Nakazny Hetman of His Royal Mercy of Zaporizhian Host", and the Left-bank one titled "Hetman of His Tsarist Mercy's Zaporizhian Host".

Eventually the official state powers of the Right-Bank Hetmanate were phased out around 1712, when the Commonwealth discontinued conformations or appointments of hetmans and colonels of Registered Cossacks, integrated them in the Commonwealth army, and abolished the ten remaining Regiments on the Right Bank.

The state powers of the Left-Bank Cossack Hetmans were gradually diminished in the 18th century, and finally abolished by Catherine II of Russia in 1764. On the other hand, the powers of the hetmans of the Zaporizhian Sich increased in the 18th century at the expense of the Sich Rada democracy, until its liquidation in 1775.

=== Left-bank Hetmanate ===
Historians such as Mykola Arkas question legitimacy of Pavlo Teteria's October 1662 election, alleging that it involved corruption. Some sources claim Teteria's election took place a little later, in January 1663. The election of Teteria led to the Povoloch Regiment Uprising in 1663, followed by larger number of disturbances in the modern region of Kirovohrad Oblast as well as Polesia (all in Right-bank Ukraine). Moreover, the political crisis that followed the Pushkar–Barabash Uprising divided the Cossack Hetmanate completely along the banks of the Dnieper River. Coincidentally, on 10 January 1663, the Tsardom of Muscovy created the new Little Russian Office (Prikaz) within its Ambassadorial Office.

Vouched by Charles Marie François Olier, marquis de Nointel, Yuriy Khmelnytsky was freed from the Ottoman captivity, appointed and along with Pasha Ibragim was sent to Ukraine fight the Moscow forces of Samoilovych and Romadanovsky. In 1681 Mehmed IV appointed George Ducas the Hetman of Ukraine, replacing Khmelnytsky.

Following the anathema on Mazepa and the election of Ivan Skoropadsky, Cossack Hetmanate was included into the Russian Kiev Governorate (Guberniya) in December 1708. Upon the death of Skoropadsky, the Hetman elections were disrupted and were awarded as a gift and a type of princely titles, first to Moldavian nobleman and later to the Russian Empress favorite.

=== Right-bank Hetmanate ===
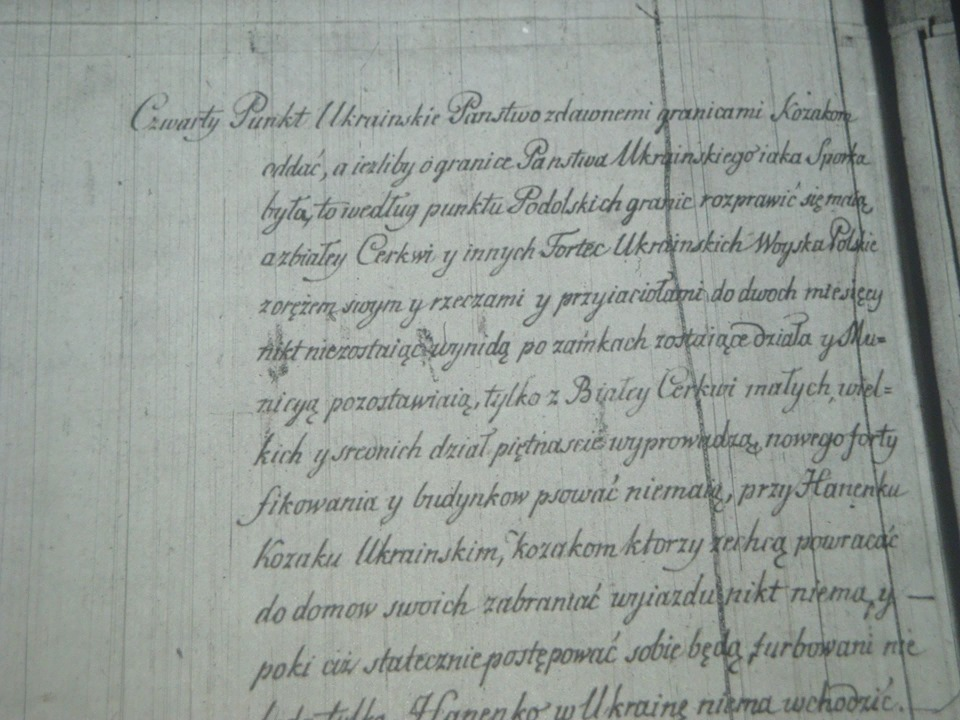
The mention of the "Ukrainian State" (Polish: Ukrainskie Panstwo) in the text of the Treaty of Buchach (1672) refers to the Right-bank Hetmanate.

As Commonwealth forces, Crimean Tatars and Ivan Vyhovsky's Cossacks delivered a crushing blow to the Russian army in the Chudniv campaign, Yurii Khmelnytsky's Cossacks returned to the Commonwealth side and signed the Treaty of Chudniv (1660), which was confirmed by the Cossack Rada at Korsun. However, because the Left-bank regiments refused to recognise his hetmancy, this led to the de facto the division of the Ukrainian Hetmanate along the banks of the Dnipro, with competing hetmans on either side. Even when Pavlo Teteria was de jure elected as Hetman of both banks in 1662, the Left Bank continued to reject his legitimacy, leading to the Black Council of 1663. The winner, Ivan Briukhovetsky, afterwards had both his opponents Yakym Somko and Vasyl Zolotarenko executed, but failed to extend his authority over the Right Bank. There, Petro Doroshenko succeeded Teteria in 1665, and confirmed as the Right-bank Hetman by the Polish king at the Treaty of Pidhaitsi, but Doroshenko defected to the Ottoman Empire by the Treaty of Korsun (1669).

In 1669, in order to depose Doroshenko, Mykhailo Khanenko was elected the Hetman of the Zaporizhian Host by the Cossack Rada in Uman, organised by the Kalnyk (Vinnytsia) Regiment, Korsun Regiment, Pavolotsky Regiment, and Uman Regiment. In 1675 John III Sobieski confirmed Ostap Hohol as Hetman (died in 1679).

=== Sanjak-bey of Yedisan (appointed by the Ottoman Empire) ===
In 1669 Petro Doroshenko received the title of Sanjak-bey of Yedisan (Ottoman Ukraine, Khanska Ukrajina, or Dobusary) from Mehmed IV. This title existed in 1669 to 1683.

- Petro Doroshenko (1669–1676)
- Yuri Khmelnytsky
- George Ducas
- Yakub-aha Rudzevych (1765–1783)

=== Hetmans-in-exile ===
On 5 April 1710 the Cossacks Rada, veterans of the battle at Poltava, elected Pylyp Orlyk to succeed Mazepa as the Hetman of Ukraine in exile. Orlyk waged a guerrilla warfare at the southern borders of the Russian Empire with the support from Ottoman and Swedish empires.

The title existed in 1710–1760.

- Pylyp Orlyk, successor of Ivan Mazepa, in exile on the Right Bank
- Hryhor Orlyk

== See also ==
- Bulawa
- Hetmans of the Polish–Lithuanian Commonwealth
- Kosh otaman
- History of Cossacks
- Zaporizhian Host
- Zaporizhian Sich
- List of leaders of Ukraine
- Taras Bulba

== Bibliography ==
- Mytsyk, Yuri Andriyovych (2004). "Гетьман" [Hetman]. Encyclopedia of History of Ukraine (in Ukrainian). Vol. 2. Kyiv: Institute of History of Ukraine. p. 99. Archived from the original on 24 June 2026.
- Wynar, Lubomyr (1993). "Registered Cossacks". Encyclopedia of Ukraine. Vol. 4. Canadian Institute of Ukrainian Studies.
- Plokhy, Serhii (2022). The Gates of Europe: A History of Ukraine. New York, NY: Basic Books. p. 414. ISBN 978-0-465-07394-8.
- Tairova-Yakovleva, Tatiana (2020). Ivan Mazepa and the Russian Empire (PDF). Montreal Kingston London Chicago: McGill-Queen's Press. p. 425. ISBN 978-0-2280-0309-0.
