= Hanna Somko =

Hanna Somko or Hanna Somkivna (Old Ukrainian: Анна Сомковна; died between 1645 and 1647) was the first wife of Ukrainian Cossack hetman Bohdan Khmelnytsky. She was the sister of Yakym Somko, who would later serve as acting hetman. Somkivna and Khmelnytsky resided in Chyhyryn county. Her marriage to Khmelnytsky produced three sons (Tymish, Yuriy and Ostap, who died as a child) and four daughters.
