= Yakym Somko =

Ukrainian Cossack hetman (died 1664)

- Іоаки^{м} Сомко, Иакимъ Самко (Ruthenian); Яким Сомко (Ukrainian)
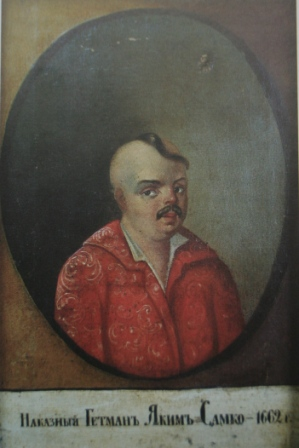
- Born: c. 1610s Pereiaslav, Polish–Lithuanian Commonwealth
- Died: September 28, 1663; Borzna, Nizhyn Regiment, Cossack Hetmanate
- Cause of death: Decapitation and stabbing
- Spouse: Iryna Semenivna Somko
- Children: Halyna Somko, Paraskeva Somko, Vasyl Somko
- Military career
- Allegiance: Zaporozhian Host (to 1660); Left-bank Ukraine
- Service years: 1648-1663
- Rank: Colonel, Sotnyk, Hetman
- Conflicts: Khmelnytsky Uprising; Russo-Polish War (1654-1667); The Ruin

Signature
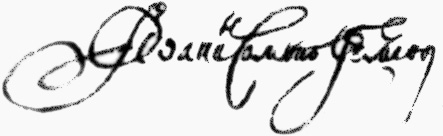

Yakym Somko (Old Ukrainian: Іоаки^{м} Сомко, Иакимъ Самко; modern Ukrainian: Яким Сомко) (c. 1610s in Pereiaslav – September 28, 1663), was a Ukrainian Cossack military leader of the Pereiaslav Regiment and was the Acting Hetman of Left-bank Ukraine in 1660-1663, during The Ruin.

Yakym's sister Hanna Somko was the first wife of Bohdan Khmelnytsky. He was first appointed captain of the Pereiaslav regiment in 1654, and became the acting colonel in 1658. At the Pereiaslav Council of 1660, which concluded the Treaty of Slobodyshche, he was elected colonel of the Pereiaslav regiment and Acting Hetman of Left-Bank Ukraine. But he strongly opposed the treaty because it restored the union with Poland, and annulled the Pereiaslav articles, which he favored more of a pro-Russian orientation. Which caused a civil war between Right-bank Cossacks who favored a pro-Polish policies, and Left-bank Cossacks who favored pro-Russian policies. In 1661 he led a revolt against Yurii Khmelnytsky with left-bank regiments, and Zaporozhian otaman Ivan Briukhovetsky.

During the Russo-Polish War he fought against the Poles, and the Crimean Tatars, in order to re-unite all of the Cossack lands under his reign. At first he was a strong supporter of the Tsardom of Russia, but initially withdrew his support because of disagreements, and a lack of help in restoring Ukraine. But Russia started seeking aid from Somko's opponents, in particular Ivan Briukhovetsky who supported Russian rule, in turn started accusing Somko of secret negotiations with Khmelnytsky, and Pavlo Teteria, which caused a delay in the final decision of the Cossack starshyna council at Kozelets in 1662 to recognize his tenure as hetman.

In order to decide on a new hetman, a Chorna rada took place on June 17–18, 1663 near Nizhyn, where a cossack council consisting of the starshyna, and a large number of common cossacks elected a new hetman for left-bank Ukraine. The officers proposed him and colonel Vasyl Zolotarenko of the Nizhyn Regiment as candidates, but the majority and including the Tsar supported Briukhovetsky and elected him the new hetman. Both Somko, and Zolotarenko were imprisoned and then were handed over to Briukhovetsky, who had them executed in Borzna on September 28, 1663.

== Legacy ==
Yakym Somko is the central character in the novel Black Council (1857) by Panteleimon Kulish.
