= Vasyl Zolotarenko =

- Born: Korsun, Polish–Lithuanian Commonwealth
- Died: September 28, 1663; Borzna, Cossack Hetmanate
- Military career
- Allegiance: Cossack Hetmanate
- Service years: 1655-1663
- Rank: Colonel
- Commands: Nizhyn Regiment
- Conflicts: Russo-Polish War (1654-1667); The Ruin

Vasyl Zolotarenko (Old Ukrainian: Василий Ничипорович(ъ) Золотаренко; Ukrainian: Василь Золотаренко) (? in Korsun – September 28, 1663), was a Ukrainian Cossack colonel of the Nizhyn Regiment (1655–1656, 1659–1663). He was the younger brother of Ivan Zolotarenko, and his sister Hanna Zolotarenko married hetman Bohdan Khmelnytsky.

He opposed hetman Ivan Vyhovsky's Treaty of Hadiach and he led a mutiny that deposed him in 1659. Along with Yakym Somko he secured Left-bank Ukraine and handed it over to Aleksei Trubetskoi. When The Ruin broke out, the hetman of Left-bank Ukraine office was vacant, he had ambitions for the hetmancy, which made him resentful of acting hetman Somko.

In order to decide on a new hetman a Chorna rada took place on 17–18 June 1663 near Nizhyn, where a cossack council consisting of the Cossack starshyna, and a large number of common cossacks elected a new hetman for Left-bank Ukraine. The officers proposed him and Somko as candidates, but the majority and including the Tsar supported Ivan Briukhovetsky and elected him the new hetman. Both Somko, and Zolotarenko were imprisoned and then were handed over to Briukhovetsky, who had them executed in Borzna on September 28, 1664.
