= Hanna Zolotarenko =

Hetmana of the Cossack Hetmanate (d. 1671)

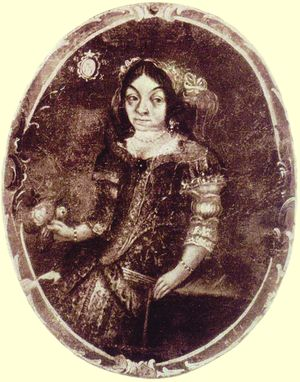
Hanna Zolotarenko

Hanna Zolotarenko (Ukrainian: Ганна Золотаренко; also Anna, Ruthenian: Анна Богдановая Хмелницкая; died after 1671), was the Hetmana of the Cossack Hetmanate by marriage to Bohdan Khmelnytsky, Hetman of Ukraine (r. 1648–1657).

Originally from Korsun from bourgeois, jeweler family. In fact, she was the sister of the two colonels (Vasyl and Ivan Zolotarenko). Her first marriage was to a colonel Pylyp, who died, leaving her a widow. With her first husband, the brother of Petro Doroshenko's mother, Anna Zolotarenko had a son, Kindrat.

After that she married with colonel Martyn Pylypenko and had a sons Danylo Pylypenko (the founder of the Datsenkos clan), Stefan, who lived in Korsun, and Osyp. All of them later were adopted by the hetman.

In 1651 she married Bohdan Khmelnytsky, as his third wife (his first wife, and mother of his children, had died young, while his second wife, Motrona, had been executed for supposed adultery and conspiracy by Bohdan's son, Tymish, earlier in 1651).

Hanna Zolotarenko had political influence, had the Universal act made in her own name, and took responsibility of the treasury. In 1671 she joined a monastery, taking the name Anastasiia.
