= Acting hetman =

An acting hetman or appointed hetman (Ukrainian: Наказний гетьман, romanized: Nakaznyi hetman) was a title used in the Cossack Hetmanate during the 17th and 18th centuries. The acting hetman served as the temporary governing authority, assuming leadership responsibilities in place of the official Hetman.

== Appointment ==
The acting hetman was appointed by the hetman himself or elected by the Council of Officers (starshyna). More than often the office was appointed by the Hetman as his deputy rather than elected by the Cossack Rada. His appointment could have been temporary and quickly abrupt and was caused by a necessity to command a group of forces at other portions of military front or tactical direction, similarly to the "field hetman" of Polish–Lithuanian Commonwealth. An acting hetman (most often a colonel) was also appointed to lead the Cossack army on a campaign when the hetman remained in his residence.

Usually acting hetman was chosen out of the General Officer Staff and more than often it was a Quartermaster general, a leader of the staff. There were incidents when acting hetman was chosen among colonels (a regional leaders) such as Yakym Somko.

== Duties ==
Acting hetman performed duties of the hetman when the later was absent during military campaigns, foreign travels, or his incapacitation. As well as a temporary replacement if the hetman's office became vacant, because of death, abdication, or deposition. Sometimes the appointed hetman acted as a full-pledged hetman, as Filon Dzhalaliy when he was elected in 1651 and 1655 as well as Ivan Bohun when he was elected after the Battle of Berestechko (Bohdan Khmelnytsky was taken as a prisoner) or as in case of Pavlo Polubotok when he acted as hetman due to the death of Ivan Skoropadsky.

On a territory of the left-bank Ukraine the office often was a counteractive to the righteously elected hetman. Sometimes acting hetmans were appointed by foreign leaders such as Ivan Bezpaly was appointed acting hetman by the Muscovite voivode of Belgorod. Among such hetmans were Yakym Somko, Ivan Bezpaly, and others.

== Notable appointments ==
At times of Bohdan Khmelnytsky such hetmans were Stanislav Krychevsky (1649) and Ivan Zolotarenko (1654–1655). Some notable acting hetmans who held this form of the office were Yakym Somko who was appointed by Yurii Khmelnytsky in 1660 until his execution in 1663, Demian Mnohohrishny was appointed by Petro Doroshenko from 1668-1669 until becoming full-time hetman, and Pavlo Polubotok who served as acting hetman in 1722, till 1724. Among other appointed hetmans were such prominent colonels as S. Podobai (1652), Y. Voronchenko (1654), D. Yermolaienko (1665), H. Vytiazenko (1665), Yakiv Lyzohub (1696), Ivan Obydovsky (1700–1701), I. Myrovych (1704), M. Myklashevsky (1706), and others.

== See also ==
- General Officer Staff (Hetmanate)
- Hetman of Zaporizhian Host
