= Yurii Khmelnytsky =

Ukrainian Cossack leader (1641–1685)

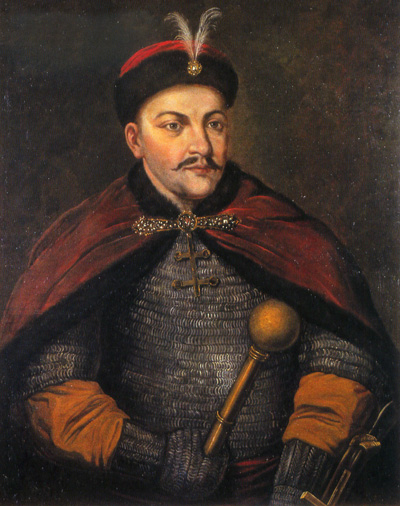

Hetman of Zaporizhian Host
- In office 27 August 1657 – 21 October 1657
- Preceded by: Bohdan Khmelnytsky
- Succeeded by: Ivan Vyhovsky
- In office 17 October 1659 – 1663
- Preceded by: Ivan Vyhovsky
- Succeeded by: Ivan Briukhovetsky (in Left-bank Ukraine); Pavlo Teteria (in Right-bank Ukraine)

Hetman of Ottoman Ukraine
- In office 1678–1681
- Preceded by: Petro Doroshenko
- Succeeded by: George Ducas

Personal details
- Born: 1641 Subotiv, near Chyhyryn, Polish–Lithuanian Commonwealth
- Died: 1685 (disputed) Kamianets-Podilskyi, Podolia Eyalet, Ottoman Empire
- Parents: Bohdan Khmelnytsky (father); Hanna Somko (mother)
- Education: Kyiv Mohyla Academy

Yurii Khmelnytsky (Ruthenian: Юрый Хмелницкій / Юрий Хмелницкий / Юрій Хмелницкій; Ukrainian: Юрій Хмельницький, Polish: Jerzy Chmielnicki, Russian: Юрий Хмельницкий), monastic name Hedeon (1641 – 1685(?)), younger son of the famous Ukrainian Hetman Bohdan Khmelnytsky and brother of Tymofiy Khmelnytsky, was a Zaporozhian Cossack political and military leader. Although he spent half of his adult life as a monk and archimandrite, he also was Hetman of Ukraine in 1659–1660 and 1678–1681 and starost of Hadiach, becoming one of the most well-known Ukrainian politicians of the "Ruin" period for the Cossack Hetmanate.

== Biography ==
=== Hetman of Ukraine ===
Yurii Khmelnytsky was born in 1641 in Subotiv near Chyhyryn in central Ukraine. In 1659, the Cossack Rada elected the 17-year-old Yurii as their hetman in Bila Tserkva, replacing the deposed Ivan Vyhovsky. The young hetman faced problems: the uneasy alliance with the Tsardom of Russia and the ongoing wars against Poland–Lithuania and against the Crimean Khanate.

During the conflict against Poland–Lithuania, Yurii Khmelntsky's Cossacks were defeated near the town of Korsun, he was captured by the Poles and later pledged loyalty to king Jan II Kazimierz of Poland–Lithuania (reigned 1648–1668).

In 1659, the parliament (sejm walny) of the Polish–Lithuanian Commonwealth granted him the status of nobility. On 24 March 1661, he became starost of Hadiach.

Yurii's perceived treason provoked a civil war within Ukraine in 1661, when the new ataman Yakym Somko led the pro-Moscow Cossacks against Yurii and his new Polish allies. At the battle near the town of Pereiaslav in the summer of 1662, Somko's Cossacks and the Russians under Grigory Romodanovsky defeated Yurii Khmelnytsky.

After the defeat, Khmelnytsky entered an alliance with the Crimean Khanate, but this resulted in little beyond massive looting and raiding of Ukrainian towns and villages by the Tatars. Thereupon, Yurii gave up his hetman title and became a monk at the Mharsky Monastery in the autumn of 1662. Between 1664 and 1667, the hetman Pavlo Teteria imprisoned him in Lviv.

=== Hetman of Ottoman Ukraine ===
After his release in 1672, he participated in a campaign against the Tatars and was captured near Uman and brought to Constantinople, where he was allowed to live in a Greek Orthodox monastery. In 1676 — after the Sultan's ally, Petro Doroshenko, surrendered to the Russians — the Porte decided to use Khmelnytsky's famous name to reinforce their claim to the Ottoman Ukraine starting the Russo-Turkish War (1676–1681).

In 1678, the Turkish army captured Chyhyryn and declared Yurii Khmelnytsky as a new hetman of Ukraine, although in reality he was only a puppet for the Ottoman Sultan. Ottoman Turkish army with Yuri in tow captured and burned down Kaniv and other Ukrainian towns. He then retired to his Sultan dictated capital at Nemyriv in Turkish occupied parts of Ukraine, as a vassal of sultan Mehmed IV until 1681, when the Turks removed him from power due to his unstable mental health and unprecedented cruelty. Two years later, he was briefly re-instated by the Poles. In 1685 it was reported that the Turks captured Yurii and executed him (strangled) in Kamianets-Podilskyi, which became the subject of hearsay. However, later researchers denounced this version as "apocryphal", based on one witness account, and noted other possibilities. Georgiy Konyssky, an 18th-century Ukrainian author and religious figure, wrote on Yurii being taken to Istanbul, before eventual exile to a monastery somewhere in the Mediterranean. One of the possible locations is Malta, where a "Cossack general's" grave is being shown as a tourist attraction.

== See also ==
- Hetman of Zaporizhian Cossacks

== Notes ==
Yurii Khmelnytsky
- Coat of arms
- Noble family: Khmelnytsky family

Preceded by Bohdan Khmelnytsky	Hetman of Ukraine; 1657	Succeeded by Ivan Vyhovsky
Preceded by Ivan Vyhovsky	Hetman of Ukraine; 1659–1663	Succeeded by Pavlo Teteria
Preceded by Petro Doroshenko	Hetman of Ukraine; 1678–1681	Succeeded by uncertain
