= Daniel Czapliński =

Polish noble

- Born: date unknown
- Died: after 1663
- Spouse: Helena Czaplińska

Drogosław Coat of Arms
- Coat of arms of Daniel Czapliński, Drogosław

Daniel Czapliński, a Polish noble of Drogosław coat of arms. He was a deputy starosta of Chyhyryn and a rotmistrz in the forces of the Polish–Lithuanian Commonwealth. He was the manager (steward) of Oleksandr Konetspolsky's property in Ukraine.

== Family and early years ==
According to Father Kasper Nesiecki, neither Bartosz Paprocki nor Szymon Okolski mention the coat of arms of the Czaplicki family in Kotwicz. Adam Bonecki called him Daniel Czaplicki, but did not indicate the coat of arms. But he has the coat of arms of Drogoslaw.

He was probably the son of Marcin, a tax collector in the Vilnius Voivodeship of the Grand Duchy of Lithuania.

In 1645-1646, the administrator of the Chołchle estate of the Vitebsk voivode Christopher Kishka in Lithuania was a certain Danylo Chaplynsky. In the letters he wrote to his breadwinner, we learn about the peasant revolts and Chaplynsky's participation in the torture of the rebel peasants. Christopher Kishka died in August 1646.

In letters to the king, the great crown hetman Mikołaj Potocki ("BearPaw"), and the crown cornet Oleksandr Konetspolsky, Bohdan Khmelnytsky called Daniel Czapliński "a swindler, a drunkard, a thief, and an extortioner of Ukrainians."

== Conflict with Chmielnicky ==
He is best known as a personal foe of Bohdan Khmelnytsky with whom he got into a dispute over property and Khmelnytsky's wife - Helena Chmielnicka, the so-called "Helen of the steppe" (this is what Franciszek Rawita-Gawroński called her because of the conflict, alluding to the Trojan epic).

The reason for the quarrels between them was the "unresolved" land issue, inspired by the magnate Oleksandr Konetspolsky as a fulfillment of the dying wish of his father Stanislav.

Czapliński seduced Chmielnicki's wife, tried to kill his son (gave orders to his servants to catch and severely beat boy in the Chyhyryn market, who barely survived after that), and organized an assassination attempt on Khmelnytsky. This is sometimes seen as one of the main trigger of the Khmelnytsky Uprising.

In 1647, Chaplinsky attacked a Khmelnytsky's rancho, robbed the property, and by trickery took away the privilege for the khutir near Subotiv (granted for life by King Sigismund III Vasa, confirmed by his son Władysław IV Vasa, for his glorious campaigns at the head of a 10,000-strong Cossack army on the Black Sea in 1621).

He took Bohdan-Zinoviy Khmelnytsky under arrest, thereby humiliating his noble dignity. Helena-Motrona Chaplinska helped in this situation, as Khmelnytsky himself describes in a letter to the crown hetman Mikołaj Potocki (1648).

According to legend, when Khmelnytsky returned to Chyhyryn in 1649, he ordered Chaplynsky to be beheaded, but mentions of him also appear in 1660.

In 1651, on the orders of his father, Tymish Khmelnytskyi began investigating the disappearance of a large sum of money from the state treasury. The Cossacks came across Chaplynskyi's letters to Motrona Khmelnytska, in which he ordered his former wife to "bury the treasures and poison the hetman." After that, the impulsive hetman's heir ordered her lover (a treasurer and former Lviv watchmaker) and his stepmother to be hanged naked in front of the gates of the family khutir in Subotiv. Some Ukrainian historians are inclined to attribute this episode to the work of Polish intelligence.

== After conflict ==
In 1649, during the uprising, he took part in the defense of Zbarazh (a volunteer in the regiment of the Bratslav voivode Stanisław Lianskoronski), in the winter campaign of Marcin Kalinowski, the Battle of Berestechko in 1651 (he commanded a unit), battle of Zhvanets, and survived the massacre near Batih.

For his military merits in 1653 he was elected as the deputy to the Crown Tribunal from Lublin.

In 1654 he fought against the Ukrainian Cossacks and Muscovites.

The last mention of him is associated with the left-bank campaign of the Poles in 1663-1664, where he personally writes a letter to Chancellor Jerzy Lubomirski.

== In popular culture ==
He was portrayed by Henryk Sienkiewicz in With Fire and Sword (Ogniem i mieczem). In the movie adaptation of the novel (by Jerzy Hoffman) he was played by Jerzy Bończak.

== General bibliography ==
- J. Kaczmarczyk, Bohdan Chmielnicki, Łódź 1988, s. 39–40.
