= Bohdan Khmelnytsky =

Hetman of the Zaporozhian Host from 1648 to 1657

- Богдан Хмельницький
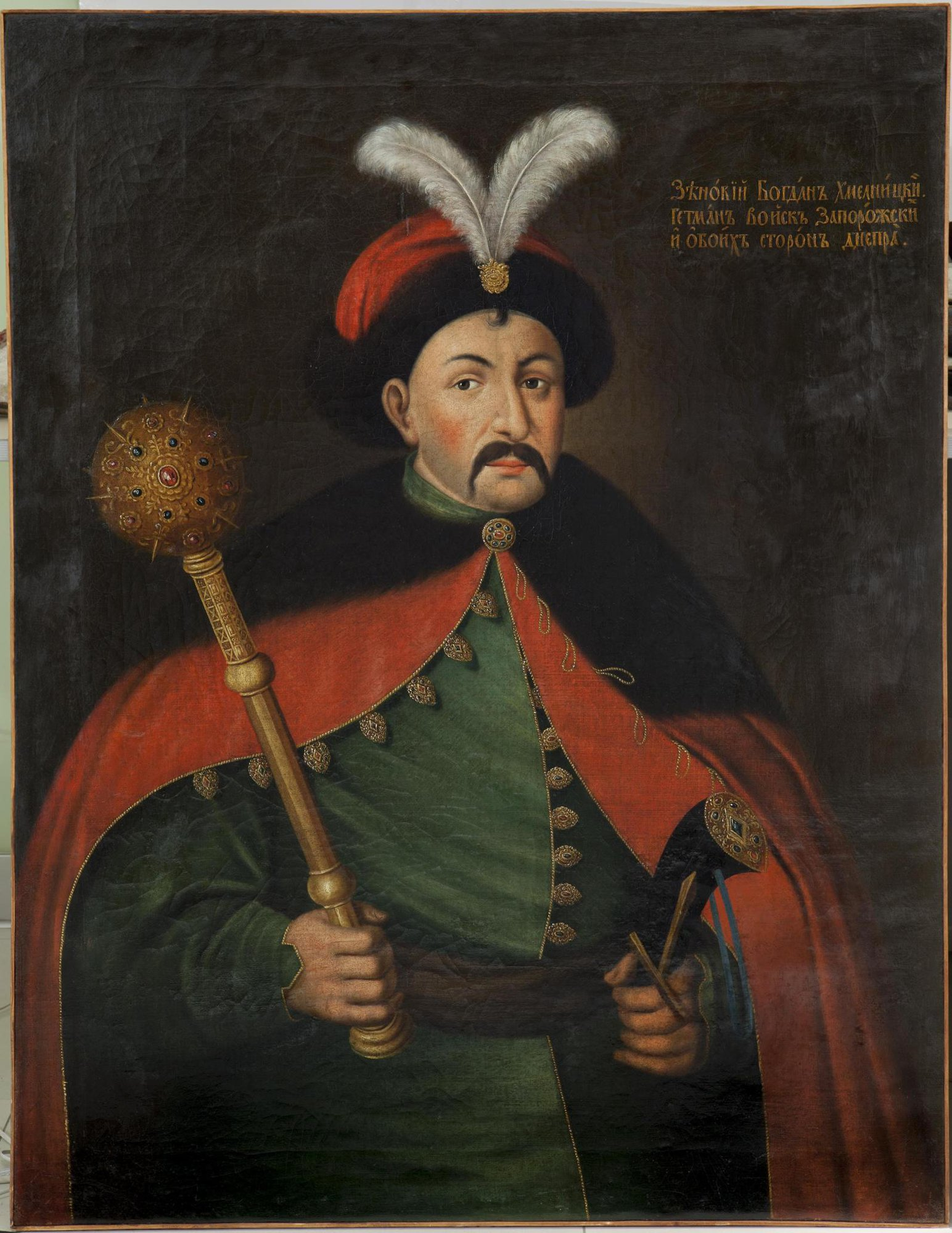
- Khmelnytsky holding a bulava, c. 1651

Hetman of the Zaporizhian Host
- In office 30 January 1648 – 6 August 1657
- Preceded by: Office established
- Succeeded by: Yurii Khmelnytsky

Personal details
- Born: c. 1595 Subotiv, Polish–Lithuanian Commonwealth
- Died: 6 August [O.S. 27 July] 1657 (aged 61–62) Chyhyryn, Cossack Hetmanate
- Resting place: St Elijah Church in Subotiv
- Spouses: Hanna Somko (m. 1625; died c. 1645); Helena Czaplińska (m. 1648; died 1651) Hanna Zolotarenko (m. 1651)
- Children: Several, including Tymish and Yurii
- Parents: Mykhailo Khmelnytsky (father); Ahaphia Rożynska (mother)
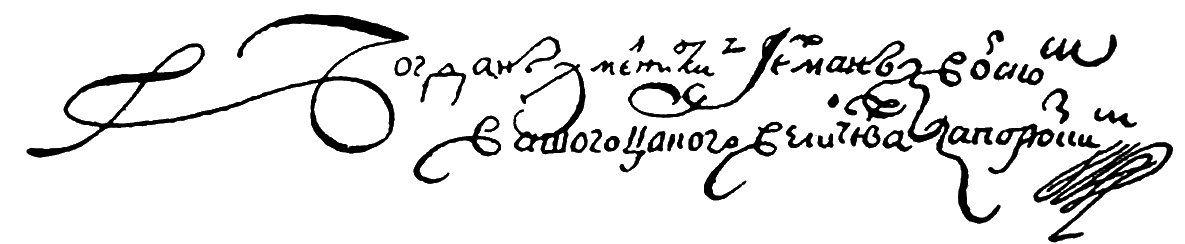
- Signature

Military service
- Allegiance: Polish–Lithuanian Commonwealth (prior to 1648); Cossack Hetmanate
- Battles/wars: See list: Polish–Russian War (1609–1618); Polish–Ottoman War (1620–1621); Battle of Cecora (POW); Cossack raids; Cossack raid on Istanbul (1629); Smolensk War; Khmelnytsky Uprising; Khmelnytsky's campaign; Battle of Zhovti Vody; Battle of Korsuń; Battle of Pyliavtsi; Siege of Zbarazh; Battle of Zboriv (1649); Moldavian Campaign (1650); Battle of Berestechko; Battle of Bila Tserkva (1651); Battle of Batih; Siege of Zhvanets; Polish–Russian War (1654–1667); Tsar Alexei's campaign of 1654–1655; Battle of Okhmativ (1655); Battle of Horodok (1655); Battle of Ozerna

Zynoviy Bohdan Mykhailovych Khmelnytsky of the Abdank coat of arms (Note: Ruthenian: Ѕѣнові Богданъ Хмелнiцкiи (Хмелницкии, Хмелницкій, Хмелнѣцкій, Хмелъницкий); modern Ukrainian: Зиновій-Богдан Михайлович Хмельницький гербу Абданк, Polish: Zenobi Bohdan Chmielnicki herbu Abdank) (c. 1595 – 6 August 1657) was a Ruthenian nobleman and military commander of Zaporozhian Cossacks as Hetman of the Zaporozhian Host, which was then under the suzerainty of the Polish–Lithuanian Commonwealth. He led the Cossacks to victory in a successful uprising against the Commonwealth and its magnates (1648–1654) that resulted in the creation of an independent Cossack state in Dnieper Ukraine.

In 1648–1649, the Cossacks under Khmelnytskyi's leadership massacred tens of thousands of Poles and Jews, with more handed over as yasir (slaves) to his Crimean Tatar allies, one of the most traumatic events in Polish and Jewish history. Under his rule of the newly established Cossack state, the massacres continued until at least 1652 and possibly led to hundreds of thousands of deaths, with the goal of eradicating non-Orthodox Ruthenian populations. In 1654, Khmelnytsky concluded the Treaty of Pereiaslav with the Russian Tsar and allied the Cossack Hetmanate with Tsardom of Russia, thus placing Ukraine under Russian protection.

Khmelnytsky's uprising permanently changed the balance of power in Europe and would play a significant role in the development of Ukrainian nationalism. In Western Europe, Khmelnytsky was compared to his rebel contemporary, Oliver Cromwell. Among Ukrainians, Khmelnytsky has been lauded as a folk hero and defender of the Orthodox faith, as well as a fighter for Ukrainian independence and founder of the first Ukrainian state; Russian imperial and Soviet propaganda meanwhile promoted him as a "unifier" of Ukraine with Russia. However, even among his compatriots Khmelnytskyi's image remained controversial due to his questionable alliances and harsh policies, which caused the death and enslavement of numerous people.

== Early life ==
Polish–Lithuanian Commonwealth during the reign of Władysław IV, c. 1635

Although there is no definite proof of Khmelnytsky's date of birth, Ukrainian-born historian Mykhailo Maksymovych suggests that it is likely 6 January 1596 [O.S. 27 December 1595] (St. Theodore's day). As was the custom in the Orthodox Church, he was baptized with one of his middle names, Theodore, translated into Ukrainian as Bohdan. A biography of Khmelnytsky by Smoliy and Stepankov, however, suggests that it is more likely he was born on 9 November (feast day of St. Zenobios, 30 October on the Julian calendar) and was baptized on 11 November (feast day of St. Theodore in the Catholic Church). In the work of Paul of Aleppo, "the Travels of Macarius: Patriarch of Antioch", Khmelnytsky is called Khatman (hetman) Zenobius Akhmil. Khmelnytsky would usually be called by his second name, Zynoviy, on religious occasions, but in everyday life he always signed as Bohdan.

Khmelnytsky was probably born in the village of Subotiv, near Chyhyryn in the Crown of the Kingdom of Poland at the estate of his father, Registered Cossack Mykhailo Khmelnytsky. According to the hypothesis of historian Ivan Krypiakevych, the elder Khmelnytsky originally came from the Peremyshl Land, although Paul Robert Magocsi proposed Belarus as his likely place of origin. Initially a courtier of Great Crown Hetman Stanisław Żółkiewski in Zhovkva, he later joined the court of his son-in-law Jan Daniłowicz, the lord of Olesko, who in 1597 became starosta of Korsuń and Chyhyryn and appointed Mykhailo his deputy (podstarosta) in Chyhyryn. Some sources state that Daniłowicz appointed Mykhailo as sotnyk already in 1590. It is likely that Mykhailo also served as an osadchy, being responsible for settlement of peasants on his master's lands. For his service, he was granted a strip of land near the town, where he set up a khutor called Subotiv, establishing an apiary and organizing a sloboda nearby.

Khmelnytsky's mother was of Cossack birth. According to the 18th-century History of the Ruthenians, she was a daughter of Cossack Hetman Bohdan Różyński from a princely Ruthenian-Lithuanian family.

There has been controversy as to whether Bohdan and his father belonged to the szlachta (Polish term for noblemen). Modern historians tend to agree that he was of noble birth, coming from Ukrainian lesser nobility.

Khmelnytsky received education at the Jesuit college in Lviv and/or in Jarosław, which could have been motivated by the absence of Orthodox schools in his native region. His course included grammar, poetics and rhetorics and comprised part of standard humanitarian education of a young nobleman during that era.

== Registered Cossack ==
=== Ottoman captivity ===
Upon completion of his studies in 1617, Khmelnytsky entered into service with the Cossacks. As early as 1619, he was sent together with his father to Moldavia, when the Polish–Lithuanian Commonwealth entered into war against the Ottoman Empire. During the battle of Cecora (Țuțora) on 17 September 1620, his father was killed, and young Khmelnytsky, among many others including future hetman Stanisław Koniecpolski, was captured by the Turks. He spent the next two years in captivity in Constantinople as a prisoner of an Ottoman Kapudan Pasha (presumably Parlak Mustafa Pasha). Other sources claim that he spent his slavery in Ottoman Navy on galleys as an oarsman, where he picked up a knowledge of Turkic languages.

While there is no concrete evidence as to his return to Ukraine, most historians believe Khmelnytsky either escaped or was ransomed. Sources vary as to his benefactor – his mother, friends, the Polish king – but perhaps it was Krzysztof Zbaraski, ambassador of the Commonwealth to the Ottomans, who in 1622 paid 30,000 thalers in ransom for all prisoners of war captured at the Battle of Cecora. Upon return to Subotiv, Khmelnytsky took over operating his father's estate and became a Registered Cossack in the Chyhyryn Regiment.

=== Cossack uprisings ===
According to some sources, Khmelnytsky could have taken part in Cossack naval raids during the 1620s, and in the Smolensk War, during which he was supposedly awarded with a sword by king Władysław IV Vasa. Khmelnytsky was known to support an increase in the number of Registered Cossacks, and some historians suggest he took part in the Pavliuk uprising. After the defeat of the revolt, he participated in talks with field hetman Mikołaj Potocki, and, as military scribe of the Zaporozhian Host, put his signature on the rebels' capitulation act adopted in the town Borowica on 24 December 1637.

Fighting didn't stop in Borowica, and rebel Cossacks rose up again under the new command of Ostryanyn and Hunia in the spring next year. Mikołaj Potocki was successful again and after a six week long siege, the rebel Cossacks were forced to capitulate on 3 August 1638. Like the year before, some registered Cossacks joined the rebels, while some of them remained loyal. Unlike the last time, Potocki decided not to punish the rebel Cossacks, but forced all of them to swear loyalty to the king and the state and swear not to seek revenge against each other. The Hetman also agreed to their request to send emissaries to the king to seek royal grace and preserve Cossack rights. They were elected on a council on 9 September 1638 in Kiev. Bohdan Khmelnytsky was one of them; the other three were Iwan Bojaryn, colonel of Kaniów, Roman Połowiec and Jan Wołczenko.

The emissaries didn't achieve much, mostly because all decisions were already made by the Sejm earlier that year, when deputies accepted the project presented by the grand Hetman Stanisław Koniecpolski. Cossacks were forced to accept harsh new terms at the next council at Masliv Stav, at the Ros river. According to one of the articles of the Ordynacya Woyska Zaporowskiego ("Ordinance of the Zaporozhian Army"), registered Cossacks lost the right to elect their own officers and a commander, called elder (starszy) or commissar. From now on, the elder was to be nominated by the Sejm, from the Grand Hetman's recommendation. The Grand Hetman also got the right to appoint all officers. Commissars, colonels, and osauls had to be noblemen, while sotniks and atamans had to be Cossacks, who were "distinguished in a service for Us and the Commonwealth". After the introduction of Sejm ordination in 1638, Khmelnytsky was demoted from the rank of colonel and became one of the ten sotnyks of Chyhyryn Regiment. However, French ambassador Count de Brégy, who met him in Warsaw in 1644, continued titling him as "colonel"; in his letter to Mazarin the diplomat described Khmelnytsky as an educated and intelligent person with a knowledge of Latin.

=== Possible involvement in France ===
In 1663 in Paris, Pierre Chevalier published a book about Khmelnytsky's uprising called Histoire de la guerre des Cosaques contre la Pologne, which he dedicated to Nicolas Léonor de Flesselles, count de Brégy, who was an ambassador to Poland in 1645. In the dedication he described the meeting de Brégy had with Khmelnytsky in France, and group of Cossacks he brought to France to fight against Spain in Flanders.

In following parts of the book Chevalier doesn't mention either Cossacks or Khmelnytsky even once, and in his other writing, Relation des Cosaques (avec la vie de Kmielniski, tirée d'un Manuscrit), published the same year, which also contains a biography of Khmelnytsky, there is no mention about his or any other Cossacks' stay in France or Flanders. Moreover, the first of Chevalier's books is the only source that mentions such an event, and there is not trace of it even in correspondence of count de Brègy, although it is true that he was conducting a recruitment of soldiers in Poland for French army in years 1646–1648, and about 3,000 of them travelled via Gdańsk to Flanders and took part in fights around Dunkirk. French sources describe those troops as infanterie tout Poulonnois qu'Allemand. They were commanded by colonels Krzysztof Przyjemski, Andrzej Przyjemski and Georges Cabray. The second recruitment that shipped off in 1647 was commanded by Jan Pleitner, Dutch military engineer in service of Władysław IV and Jan Denhoff, colonel of Royal Guard. 17th century French historian Jean-François Sarasin in his Histoire de siège de Dunkerque described the participation of Polish mercenaries in fights over Dunkirk, noting that they were commanded by one "Sirot". Some historians identify him as Ivan Sirko, legenary Cossack Kosh Otaman. Some Ukrainian historians support claims that Khmelnytsky and Cossacks were actually in France, while others, including most Polish scholars, find it unlikely.

=== Czapliński Affair ===
Upon the death of magnate Stanisław Koniecpolski (March 1646), his successor, Aleksander, redrew the maps of his possessions. He laid claim to Khmelnytsky's estate, claiming it as his. Trying to find protection from this grab by the powerful magnate, Khmelnytsky wrote numerous appeals and letters to different representatives of the Polish crown, but to no avail. At the end of 1645, the Chyhyryn starosta Daniel Czapliński officially received authority from Koniecpolski to seize Khmelnytsky's Subotiv estate.

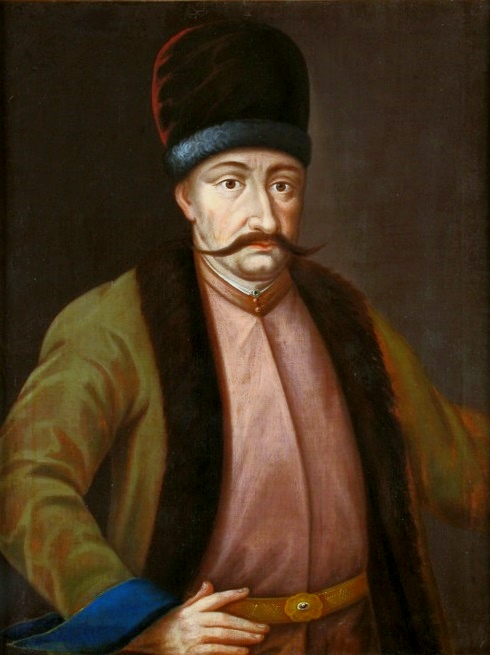
Portrait of Bohdan Khmelnytsky (c. 1650) in the District Museum in Tarnów. Khmelnytsky obtained ready-made garments from the East. According to a 1651 message, Sultan Mehmed IV sent to him "a samite caftan, one of his honorable royal caftans."

In the summer of 1646, Khmelnytsky arranged an audience with King Władysław IV to plead his case, as he had a favourable standing at the court. Władysław, who wanted Cossacks on his side in the wars he planned, gave Khmelnytsky a royal charter, protecting his rights to the Subotiv estate. But, because of the structure of the Commonwealth at that time and the lawlessness of those territories, even the King was not able to prevent a confrontation with local magnates. At the beginning of 1647, Daniel Czapliński started to harass Khmelnytsky in order to force him off the land. On two occasions the magnate had Subotiv raided: considerable property damage was done and Khmelnytsky's son Yuriy was badly beaten. Finally, in April 1647, Czapliński succeeded in evicting Khmelnytsky from the land, and he was forced to move with his large family to a relative's house in Chyhyryn.

In May 1647, Khmelnytsky arranged a second audience with the king to plead his case, but found him unwilling to confront a powerful magnate. In addition to losing the estate, Khmelnytsky suffered the loss of his wife Hanna, and he was left alone with their children. During that time, he planned to marry Motrona (Helena), the so-called "Helen of the steppe", reportedly an orphan from a Polish noble family who found refuge at Khmelnytsky's estate. However, in the same year Motrona was abducted and forcibly married to Czapliński during a raid on Khmelnytsky's property. Khmelnytsky was unable to regain the land and property of his estate or financial compensation for it. During this time, he met several higher Polish officials to discuss the Cossacks' war with the Tatars, and used this occasion again to plead his case with Czapliński, still unsuccessfully.

While Khmelnytsky found no support from the Polish officials, he found it in his Cossack friends and subordinates. His Chyhyryn regiment and others were on his side. All through the autumn of 1647 Khmelnytsky travelled from one regiment to another, and had numerous consultations with Cossack leaders in the area. His activity raised suspicion among the local Polish authorities, already used to Cossack revolts; he was promptly arrested. Koniecpolski issued an order for his execution, but the Chyhyryn Cossack polkovnyk, who held Khmelnytsky, was persuaded to release him. Not willing to tempt fate any further, Khmelnytsky headed for the Zaporozhian Sich with a group of his supporters.

== Hetman ==
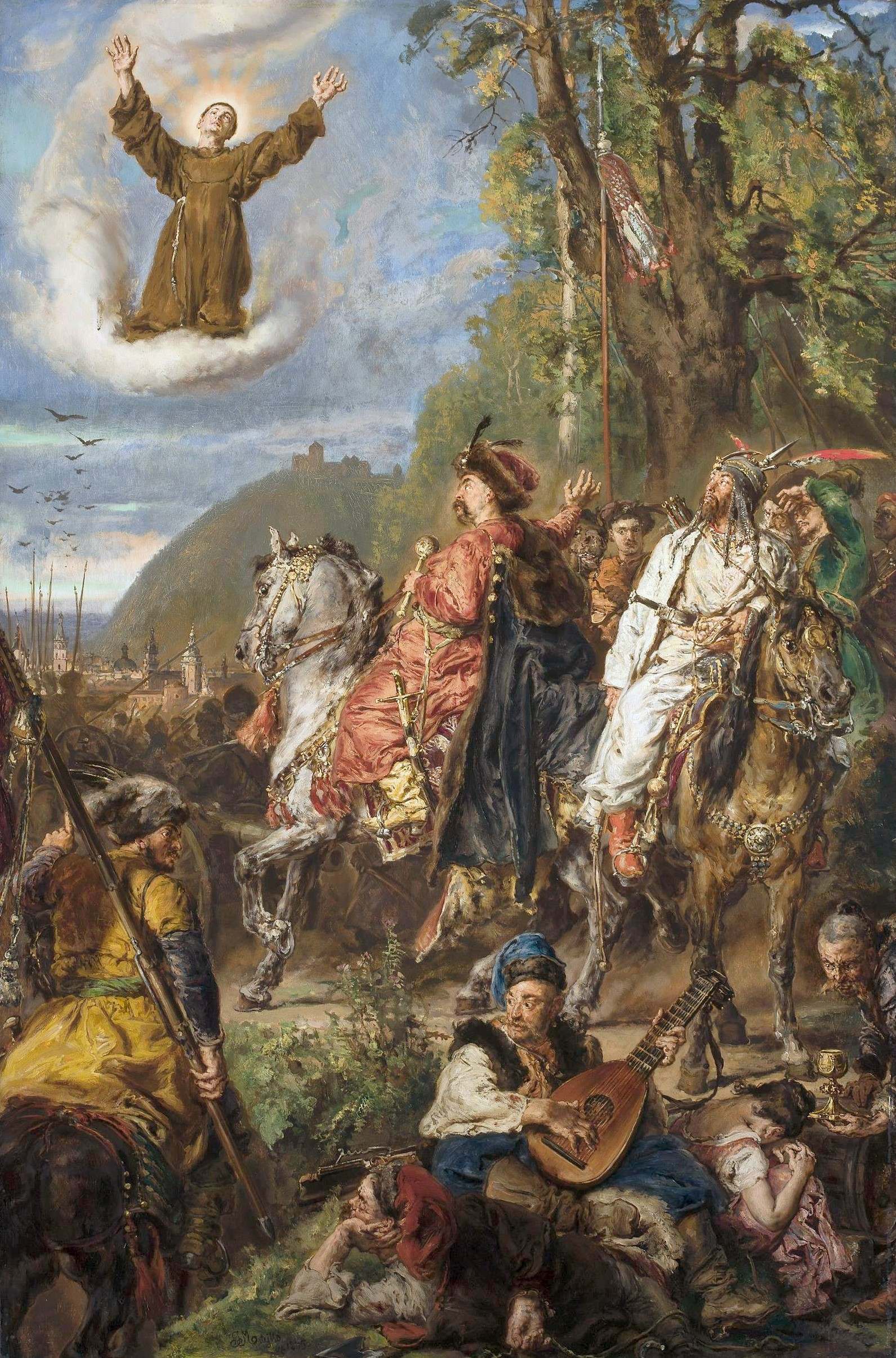
Bohdan Khmelnytsky (left) with Tugay Bey (right) at Lviv, oil on canvas by Jan Matejko, 1885, National Museum in Warsaw

While the Czapliński Affair is generally regarded as the immediate cause of the uprising, it was primarily a catalyst for actions representing rising popular discontent. Religion, ethnicity, and economics factored into this discontent. While the Polish–Lithuanian Commonwealth remained a union of nations, a sizable population of Orthodox Ruthenians was ignored. Oppressed by the Polish magnates, they took their wrath out on Poles, as well as the Jews, who often managed the estates of Polish nobles. The advent of the Counter-Reformation worsened relations between the Orthodox and Catholic Churches. Many Orthodox Ukrainians considered the Union of Brest as a threat to their Orthodox faith.

=== Initial success ===
At the end of January 1648, a Cossack Rada was called, and Khmelnytsky was unanimously elected a hetman. A period of feverish activity followed. Cossacks were sent with hetman's letters to many regions of Ukraine calling on Cossacks and Orthodox peasants to join the rebellion, Khortytsia was fortified, efforts were made to acquire and make weapons and ammunition, and emissaries were sent to the Khan of Crimea, İslâm III Giray.

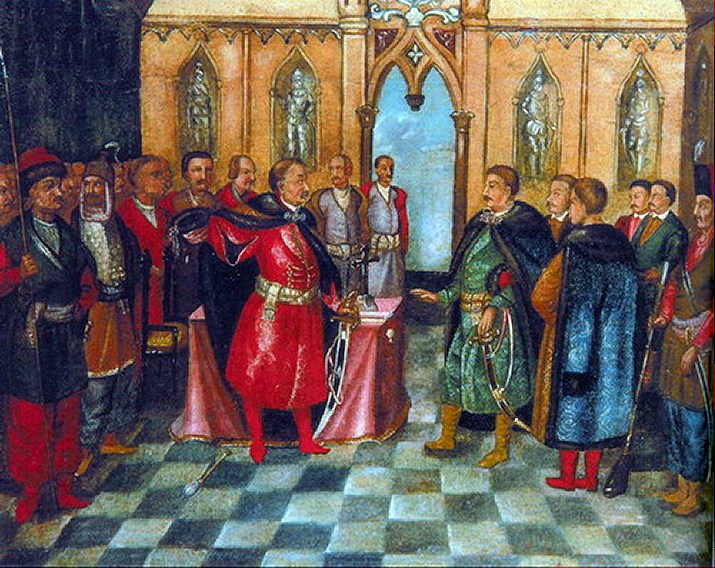
Meeting of Khmelnytsky with the Polish envoy, 1648 (unknown author, 17th century)

Initially, Polish authorities took the news of Khmelnytsky's arrival at the Sich and reports about the rebellion lightly. The two sides exchanged lists of demands: the Poles asked the Cossacks to surrender the mutinous leader and disband, while Khmelnytsky and the Rada demanded that the Commonwealth restore the Cossacks' ancient rights, stop the advance of the Ruthenian Uniate Greek Catholic Church, yield the right to appoint Orthodox leaders of the Sich and of the Registered Cossack regiments, and to remove Commonwealth troops from Ukraine. The Polish magnates considered the demands an affront, and an army headed by Stefan Potocki moved in the direction of the Sich.

Had the Cossacks stayed at Khortytsia, they might have been defeated, as in many other rebellions. However, Khmelnytsky marched against the Poles. The two armies met on 16 May 1648 at Zhovti Vody, where, aided by the Tatars of Tugay Bey, the Cossacks inflicted their first crushing defeat on the Commonwealth. It was repeated soon afterwards, with the same success, at the Battle of Korsuń on 26 May 1648. Khmelnytsky used his diplomatic and military skills: under his leadership, the Cossack army moved to battle positions following his plans, Cossacks were proactive and decisive in their manoeuvrers and attacks, and most importantly, he gained the support of both large contingents of registered Cossacks and the Crimean Khan, his crucial ally for the many battles to come.

=== Establishment of Cossack Hetmanate ===
Coat of arms of the Cossack Hetmanate

The Patriarch of Jerusalem Paiseus, who was visiting Kiev at this time, referred to Khmelnytsky as the Prince of Rus. In February 1649, during negotiations in Pereiaslav with a Polish delegation headed by Senator Adam Kysil, Khmelnytsky declared that he was "the sole autocrat of Rus" and that he had "enough power in Ukraine, Podilia, and Volhynia... in his land and principality stretching as far as Lviv, Kholm (modern Chełm), and Halych."

I already did more than was thinking before, now I will obtain what I revised recently. I will liberate out of the Polish woe all of the Ruthenian people! Before I was fighting for the insults and injustice caused to me, now I will fight for our Orthodox faith. And all people will help me in that all the way to Lublin and Krakow, and I won't back off from the people as they are our right hand. And for the purpose lest you won't attack cossacks by conquering peasants, I will have two, three hundred thousands of them.

— (Bohdan Khmelnytsky, the Prince of Ruthenia)

After the period of initial military successes, the state-building process began. His leadership was demonstrated in all areas of state-building: military, administration, finance, economics and culture. Khmelnytsky made the Zaporozhian Host the supreme power in the new Ukrainian state and unified all the spheres of Ukrainian society under his authority. Khmelnytsky built a new government system and developed military and civilian administration.

A new generation of statesmen and military leaders came to the forefront: Ivan Vyhovsky, Pavlo Teteria, Danylo Nechai and Ivan Nechai, Ivan Bohun, Hryhoriy Hulyanytsky. From Cossack polkovnyks, officers, and military commanders, a new elite within the Cossack Hetman state was born. Throughout the years, the elite preserved and maintained the autonomy of the Cossack Hetmanate in the face of Russia's attempt to curb it. It was also instrumental in the onset of the period of Ruin that followed, eventually destroying most of the achievements of the Khmelnytsky era.

=== Complications ===
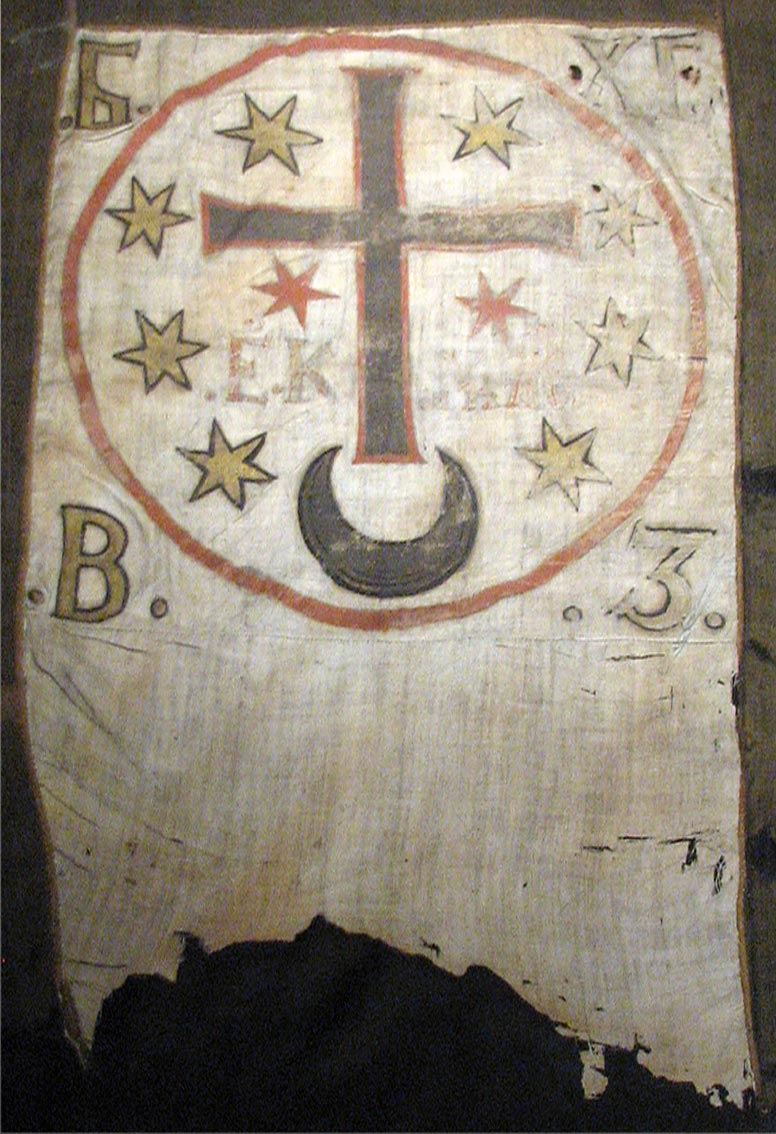
Bohdan Khmelnytsky's banner that was taken at the battle of Berestechko. It was later taken by the Swedes in Warsaw 1655 and is now to be seen at Armémuseum, Stockholm, Sweden.

Khmelnytsky's initial successes were followed by a series of setbacks as neither Khmelnytsky nor the Commonwealth had enough strength to stabilise the situation or to inflict a defeat on the enemy. What followed was a period of intermittent warfare and several peace treaties, which were seldom upheld. From spring 1649 onward, the situation turned for the worse for the Cossacks; as Polish attacks increased in frequency, they became more successful. The resulting Treaty of Zboriv on 18 August 1649 was unfavourable for the Cossacks. It was followed by another defeat at the battle of Berestechko on 18 June 1651 in which the Tatars betrayed Khmelnytsky and held the hetman captive. The Cossacks suffered a crushing defeat, with an estimated 30,000 casualties. They were forced to sign the Treaty of Bila Tserkva, which favoured the Polish–Lithuanian Commonwealth. Warfare broke open again and, in the years that followed, the two sides were almost perpetually at war. Now, the Crimean Tatars played a decisive role and did not allow either side to prevail. It was in their interests to keep both Ukraine and the Polish–Lithuanian Commonwealth from getting too strong and becoming an effective power in the region.

Khmelnytsky started looking for another foreign ally. Although the Cossacks had established their de facto independence from Poland, the new state needed legitimacy, which could be provided by a foreign monarch. In search of a protectorate, Khmelnytsky approached the Ottoman sultan in 1651, and formal embassies were exchanged. The Turks offered vassalship, like their other arrangements with contemporary Crimea, Moldavia and Wallachia. However, the idea of a union with the Muslim monarch was not acceptable to the general populace and most Cossacks.

The other possible ally was the Tsardom of Russia. However, despite appeals for help from Khmelnytsky in the name of the shared Orthodox faith, the tsar preferred to wait, until the threat of a Cossack-Ottoman union in 1653 finally forced him to action.

=== Treaty with the tsar ===
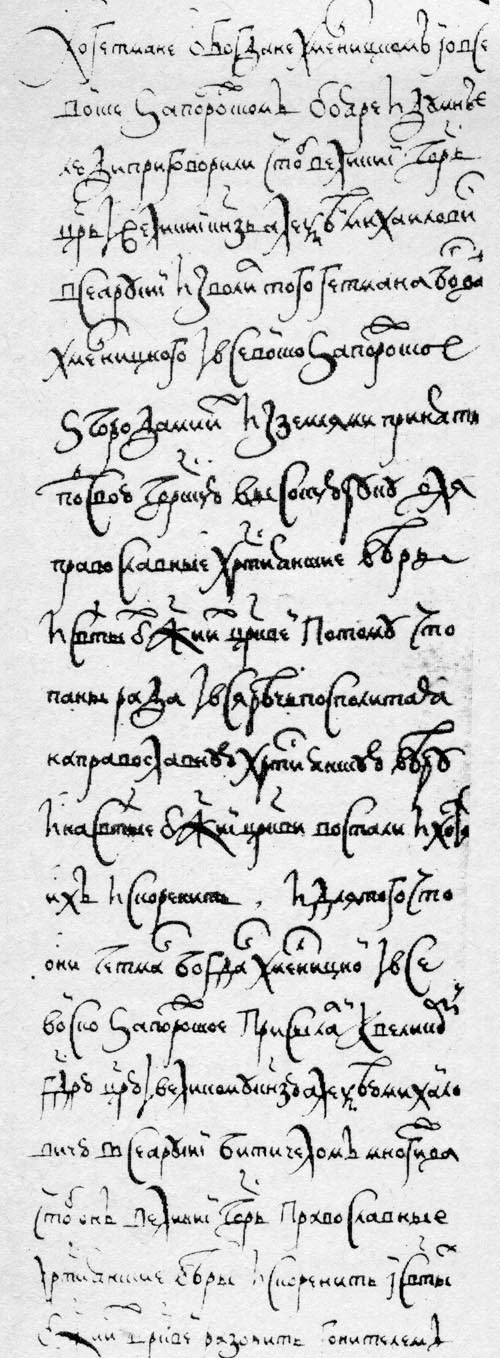
1653 resolution of Zemsky sobor accepting the Zaporozhian Host under the tsar's sovereignty

After a series of negotiations, it was agreed that the Cossacks would accept overlordship by the Tsar Alexei Mikhailovich. To finalize the treaty, a Russian embassy led by boyar Vasily Buturlin came to Pereiaslav, where, on 18 January 1654, the Cossack Rada was called and the treaty concluded. Historians have not come to a consensus in interpreting the intentions of the tsar and Khmelnytsky in signing this agreement. The treaty legitimized Russian claims to the capital of Kievan Rus' and strengthened the tsar's influence in the region. Khmelnytsky needed the treaty to gain a legitimate monarch's protection and support from a friendly Orthodox power.

Historians have differed in their reading of Khmelnytsky's goal with the union: whether it was to be a military union, a suzerainty, or a complete incorporation of Ukraine into the Tsardom of Russia.

The differences were expressed during the ceremony of the oath of allegiance to the tsar: the Russian envoy refused to reciprocate with an oath from the ruler to his subjects, as the Cossacks and Ruthenians expected, since it was the custom of the Polish king.

Khmelnytsky stormed out of the church and threatened to cancel the entire treaty. The Cossacks decided to rescind the demand and abide by the treaty.

=== Final years ===
As a result of the 1654 Treaty of Pereiaslav, the geopolitical map of the region changed. Russia entered the scene, and the Cossacks' former allies, the Tatars, had switched sides and gone over to the Polish side, initiating warfare against Khmelnytsky and his forces. Tatar raids depopulated whole areas of Sich. Cossacks, aided by the Tsar's army, took revenge on Polish possessions in Belarus, and in the spring of 1654, the Cossacks drove the Poles from much of the country. Sweden entered the mêlée. Old adversaries of both Poland and Russia, they occupied a share of Lithuania before the Russians could get there.

The occupation displeased Russia because the tsar sought to take over the Swedish Baltic provinces. In 1656, with the Commonwealth increasingly war-torn but also increasingly hostile and successful against the Swedes, the ruler of Transylvania, George II Rákóczi, also joined in. Charles X of Sweden had solicited his help because of the massive Polish popular opposition and resistance against the Swedes. Under blows from all sides, the Commonwealth barely survived.

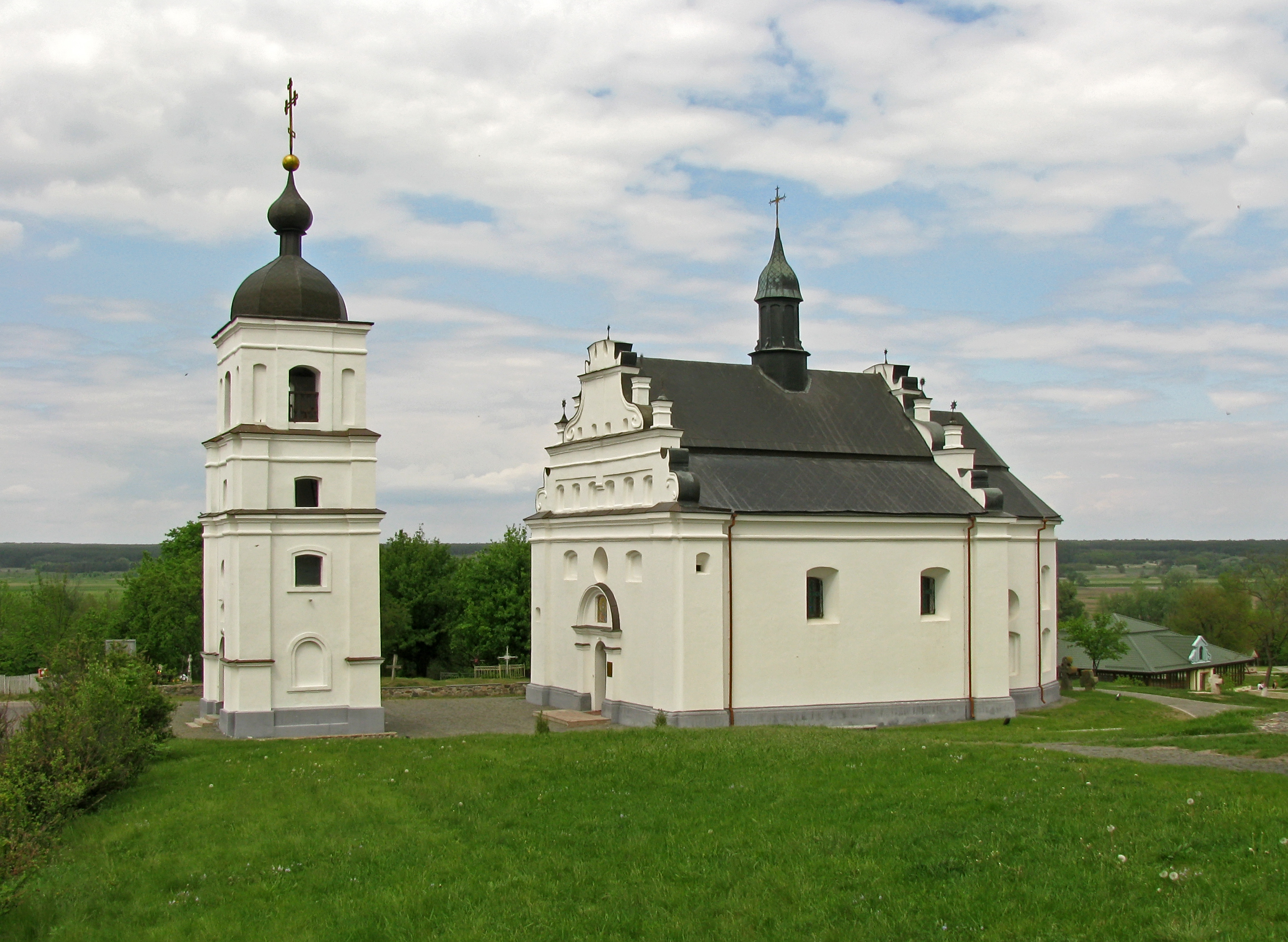
St Elijah Church in Subotiv, Ukraine, where Khmelnytsky was buried

Russia attacked Sweden in July 1656, while its forces were deeply involved in Poland. That war ended in status quo two years later, but it complicated matters for Khmelnytsky, as his ally was now fighting his overlord. In addition to diplomatic tensions between the tsar and Khmelnytsky, a number of other disagreements between the two surfaced. In particular, they concerned Russian officials' interference in the finances of the Cossack Hetmanate and in the newly captured Belarus. The tsar concluded a separate treaty with the Poles in Vilnius in 1656. The Hetman's emissaries were not even allowed to attend the negotiations. Khmelnytsky wrote an irate letter to the tsar accusing him of breaking the Pereiaslav agreement and contrasted this with the honesty of the Swedes:

The Swedes are an honest people; when they pledge friendship and alliance, they honor their word. However, the Tsar, in establishing an armistice with the Poles and in wishing to return us into their hands, has be-haved most heartlessly with us.

In Poland, the Cossack army and Transylvanian allies suffered a number of setbacks. As a result, Khmelnytsky had to deal with a Cossack rebellion on the home front. Troubling news also came from Crimea, as Tatars, in alliance with Poland, were preparing for a new invasion of Ukraine. Though already ill, Khmelnytsky continued to conduct diplomatic activity, at one point even receiving the tsar's envoys from his bed.

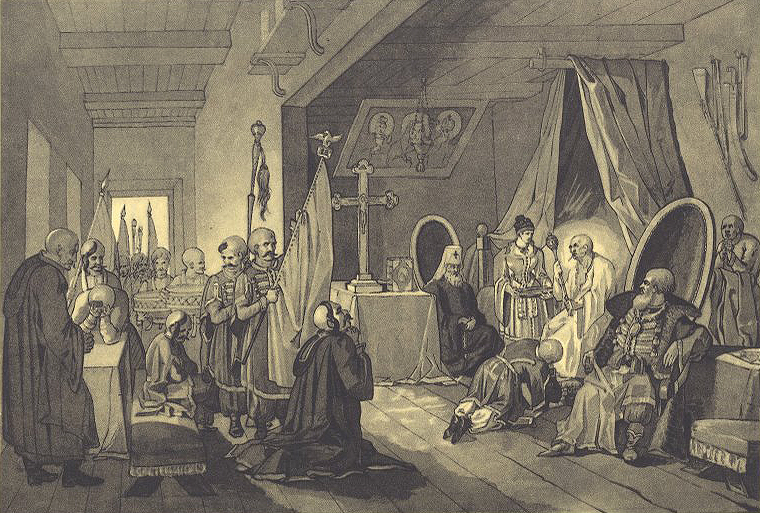
Death of Bohdan [Khmelnytsky], an 1836-1837 painting by Taras Shevchenko

On 22 July, he suffered a cerebral hemorrhage and became paralysed after his audience with the Kiev Colonel Zhdanovich. His expedition to Halychyna had failed because of mutiny within his army. Less than a week later, Bohdan Khmelnytsky died at 5 a.m. on 27 July 1657. His funeral was held on 23 August, and his body was taken from his capital, Chyhyryn, to his estate, at Subotiv, for burial in his ancestral church. In 1664 a Polish hetman Stefan Czarniecki recaptured Subotiv and, according to some Ukrainian historians, ordered the bodies of the hetman and his son, Tymish, to be exhumed and desecrated, while others claim that is not the case. (Note: Some Ukrainian historians dispute that his grave was desecrated. In 1973, an expedition investigated the site of the church and discovered remains of people, not found before.)

== Personal life ==
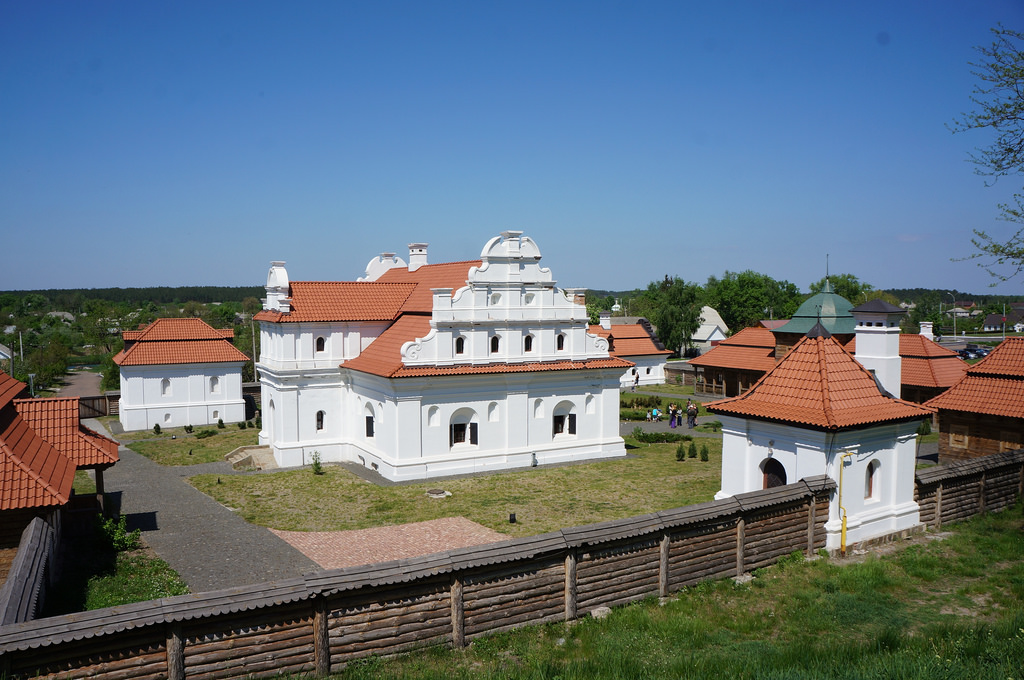
Hetman's residence in Chyhyryn (modern reconstruction)

=== Looks and habits ===
Syrian traveller Paul of Aleppo, who met Khmelnytskyi on his way to Moscow in 1654, described the hetman as a very austere personality: unlike contemporary monarchs, he didn't allow himself to be served during banquets, used ordinary plates and drank from simple cups, although many of his subordinates could afford themselves silver and golden tableware. Khmelnytskyi was an avid drinker of coffee, a habit he may have learnt during his years in Turkish captivity, and took pleasure in smoking tobacco from a pipe. The floor of Khmelnytskyi's bedroom in his residence at Chyhyryn was adorned with a carpet, and its walls were decorated with a bow and arrows, hinting at the hetman's reputation as a masterful shooter.

Venetian ambassador Alberto Vimina, who visited Khmelnytsky's residence in Chyhyryn in 1650, described the hetman as a tall man with a sturdy build, who spoke in a mature way and possessed a strong intellect. According to him, Khmelnytsky was well-mannered and personally welcomed any Cossack visitor to his house. The hetman was loved by his soldiers, but at the same time used strict punishments for those who disobeyed him. According to his contemporary Albrecht Radziwiłł, Khmelnytsky "held all Ruthenians in such obedience, that they were ready to do anything following his slightest movement". The hetman was also widely known for his cunning and ability to hide his true intentions.

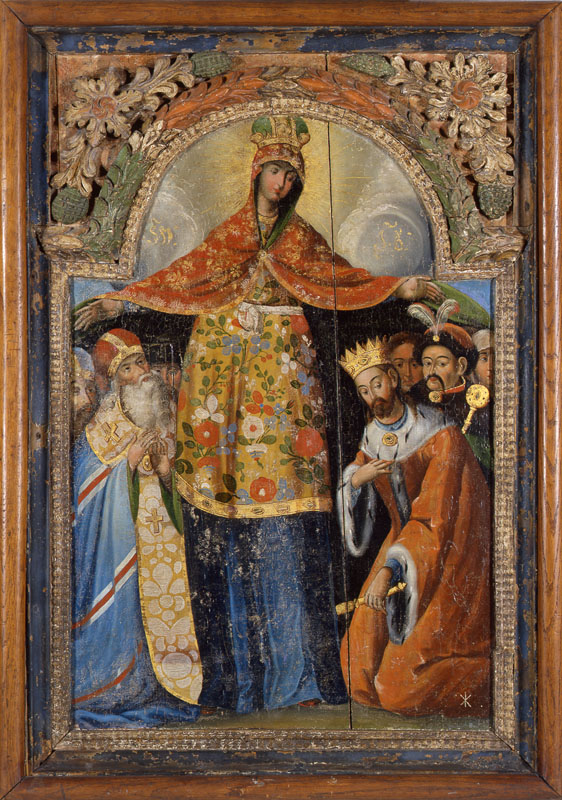
An icon dedicated to Pokrova (Intercession of the Holy Virgin) containing the portrait of Khmelnytsky (on the right), Kyiv region, late 17th-early 18th century

When in a good mood, Khmelnytsky would play bandura. His favourite alcoholic drinks were homemade horilka, beer and mead. According to contemporaries, Khmelnytsky was prone to silent contemplation, but if angered by something, his fury could be frightening. During attacks of anger, the hetman was reported to behave as if he were a madman, running around, tearing his hair and hitting the ground with his feet. However, such attacks would end with immediate repentance. In one instance, during a heated discussion at a Cossack Rada, Khmelnytsky cut the hand of one of his colonels with a sword, but then immediately bowed to him and ordered his servants to bring a barrel of mead as a compensation.

=== Religion ===
According to Ottoman historian Mustafa Naima, during his captivity in Constantinople after the Battle of Cecora, Khmelnytskyi either secretly converted to Islam, or at least seriously contemplated becoming a Muslim. During a meeting with Crimean khan Islam III Giray, he reportedly performed namaz in order to prove the ruler his allegiance to the Muslim faith. Ottoman sources also mention that the hetman suited a sharia court after the murder of his friend, Janissary leader Bektas-aga. Khmelnytskyi's alleged connections to Islam were later used by his political opponents in Poland and Ukraine, including Sylvester Kosiv, Metropolitan of Kyiv.

Some modern authors argue, that the supposed "conversion" to Islam by Khmelnytskyi was likely a part of his political game aimed to create a Cossack state. According to Samiilo Velychko, the hetman used rumours about his Muslim sympathies in order to blackmail Warsaw and Moscow, threatening to become a vassal of the Ottomans. Other sources, such as the aforementioned memoirs of Paul of Aleppo, describe him as a devout Orthodox Christian.

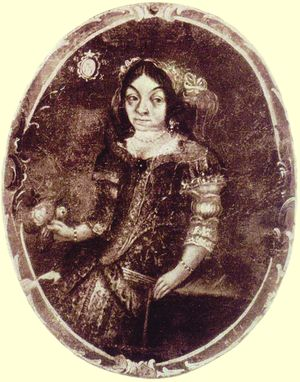
A likely portrait of Khmelnytskyi's third wife Hanna Zolotarenko

=== Marriage and family ===
After Khmelnytsky's father was killed at the Battle of Cecora and Khmelnytsky himself was imprisoned by the Turks for two years, he married one Hanna Somkivna (sometimes also called Hafia) sometime around 1625 following his release; the couple settled in his late father's estate. All of Khmelnytsky's children were from Hanna, including the daughters whose names are known: Stepanyda, Olena, and Kateryna. There were possibly other daughters, whose names are unknown. His first son, Tymish (diminutive of Tymofiy), was born in 1632, and another son, Yuriy, was born in 1640. Little is known of Khmelnytsky's third and fourth sons, except that they both died young and that the fourth son likely died at the hands of Czapliński's men during his attack on Khmelnytsky's estate.

After the death of Hanna sometime around 1645–1647 and the beginning of the uprising in 1648, Khmelnytsky married Helena (also known as Motrona), the wife of his archenemy, Daniel Czapliński sometime around January 1649 [O.S. December 1648]. Their union received a special blessing by the Patriarch of Constantinople, as Helena was technically still married to Daniel and was Catholic.

After Helena was executed in 1651 due to allegations of treason and infidelity by Khmelnytsky's eldest son, Tymish, the Hetman married for a third time in 1651, now to the widow Hanna Zolotarenko, the sister of Nizhyn colonels Vasyl and Ivan Zolotarenko. Upon Khmelnytskyi's death in 1657, she entered a nunnery.

== Legacy ==
Khmelnytsky had a crucial influence not only on the history of Ukraine, but also affected the balance of power in Europe, as the weakening of Poland–Lithuania was exploited by Austria, Saxony, Prussia, and Russia. His actions and role in events were viewed differently by different contemporaries, and even now there are greatly differing perspectives on his legacy.

=== Views of contemporaries ===
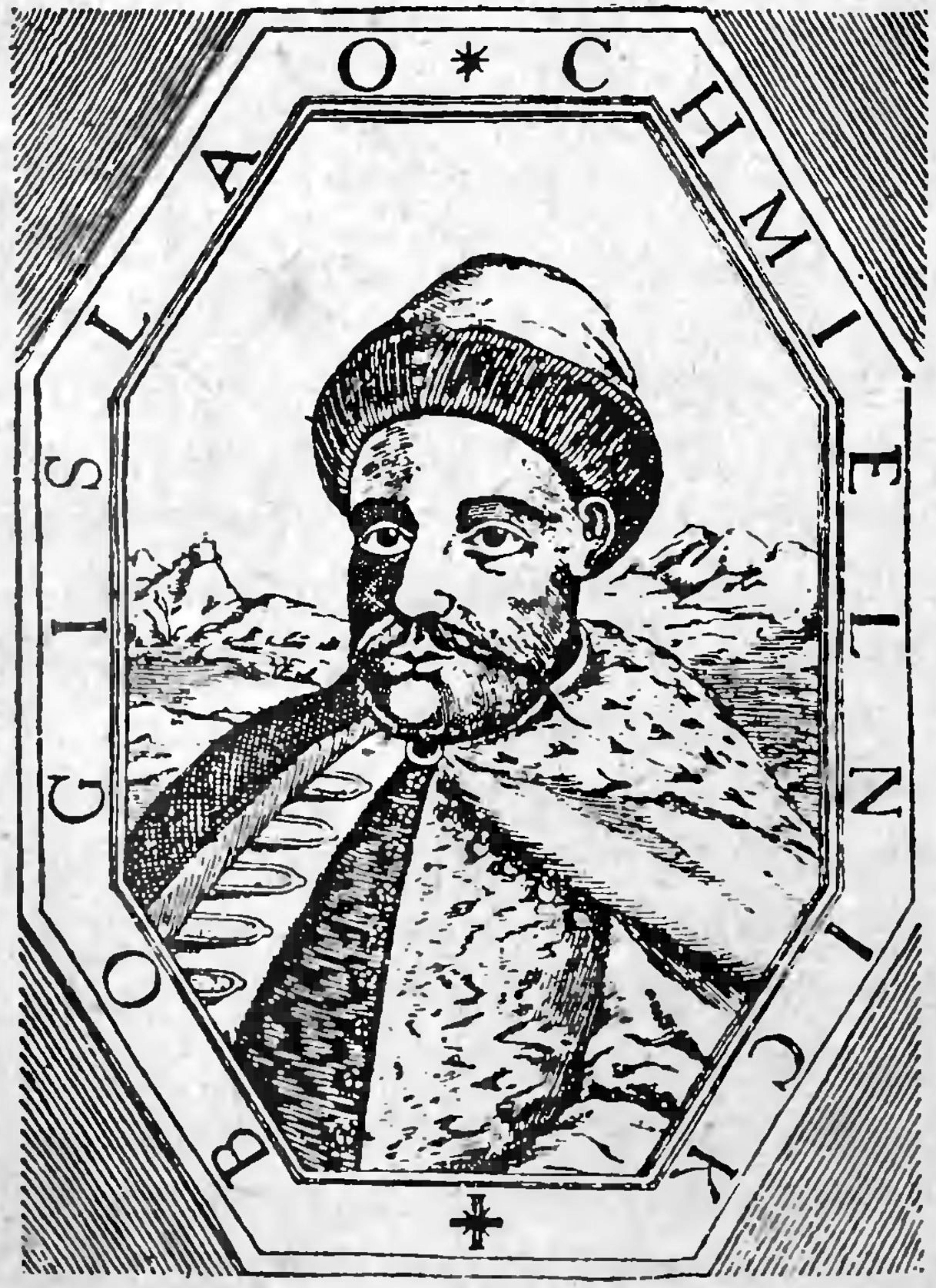
A 17th-century Italian engraving of Khmelnytsky

Among the nobility of the Polish–Lithuanian Commonwealth, Khmelnytsky's figure became associated with treason, robbery, tyranny and unrest. His first name, meaning "given by God" was interpreted as a sign of his alleged mission to punish the republic for its sins, and he was considered to be a "scourge of God". Some authors of the time went on to connect the appearance of a comet at the beginning of the uprising with the following calamities. In his 1654 book dedicated to recent civil wars throughout Europe, Venetian author Maiolino Bisaccioni depicted Khmelnytsky as an intelligent, but cruel and treacherous man. A similar image is presented in an epitaph to the hetman written by Lorenzo Crasso.

A different image of Khmelnytsky emerged in England, which at the time was engulfed by its own revolution. It is claimed that Oliver Cromwell saw the hetman as a possible ally against the Catholics, and even addressed a letter to him. Such a letter has never been found, but it is supposed to have borne the following greeting: "Bohdan Khmelnytsky, by the Grace of God generalissimo of the army and ancient Greek religion and Church, master of all the Zaporozhian Cossacks, dread and exterminator of Polish nobility, conqueror of fortresses, eradicator of Roman priests, persecutor of pagans, the Antichrist, and Jews".

In Ukraine during Khmelnytsky's time the hetman's name was interpreted as a sign of his divine mission to liberate the country. In a poem printed as an appendix to the Zaporozhian Host registry of 1649, he was mentioned along with Petro Mohyla as a protector of Christianity and benefactor of Rus'. During the hetman's entry into Kyiv, students of the Kyiv Mohyla Collegium welcomed him as "Moses" and "liberator from Polish slavery". Many dumas which emerged after the uprising depicted the hetman in a similar way, but other songs presented a negative attitude, condemning Khmelnytsky for his cooperation with Tatars. A negative point of view on Khmelnytsky's rebellion as a cause of human suffering is presented in the anonymous Eyewitness Chronicle. The anonymous History of the Ruthenians contains passages blaming the hetman for leading his people into an even worse slavery through his union with the Tsar.

=== Ukrainian assessment ===
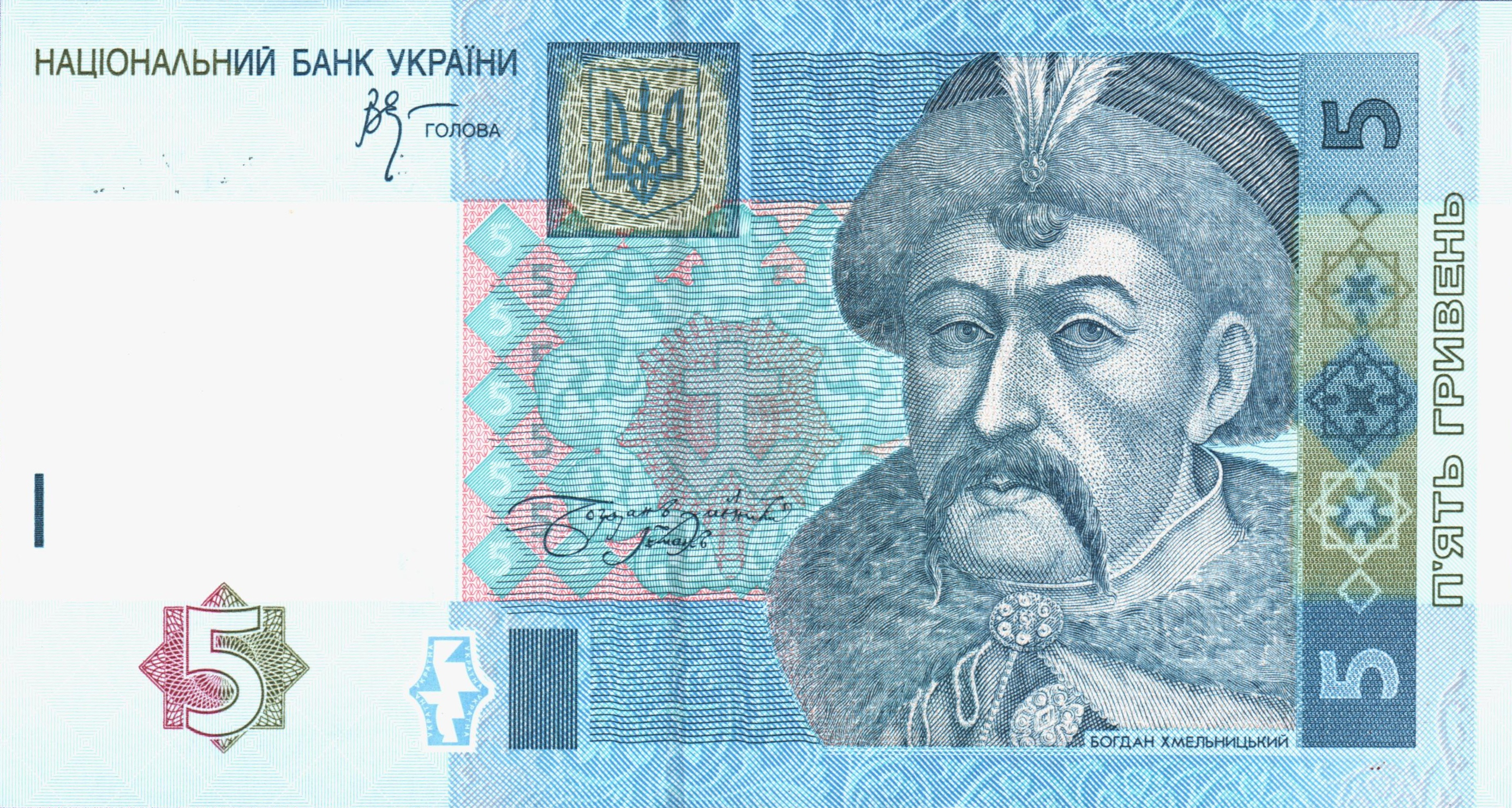
A five Ukrainian hryvnia banknote depicting Hetman Bohdan Khmelnytsky

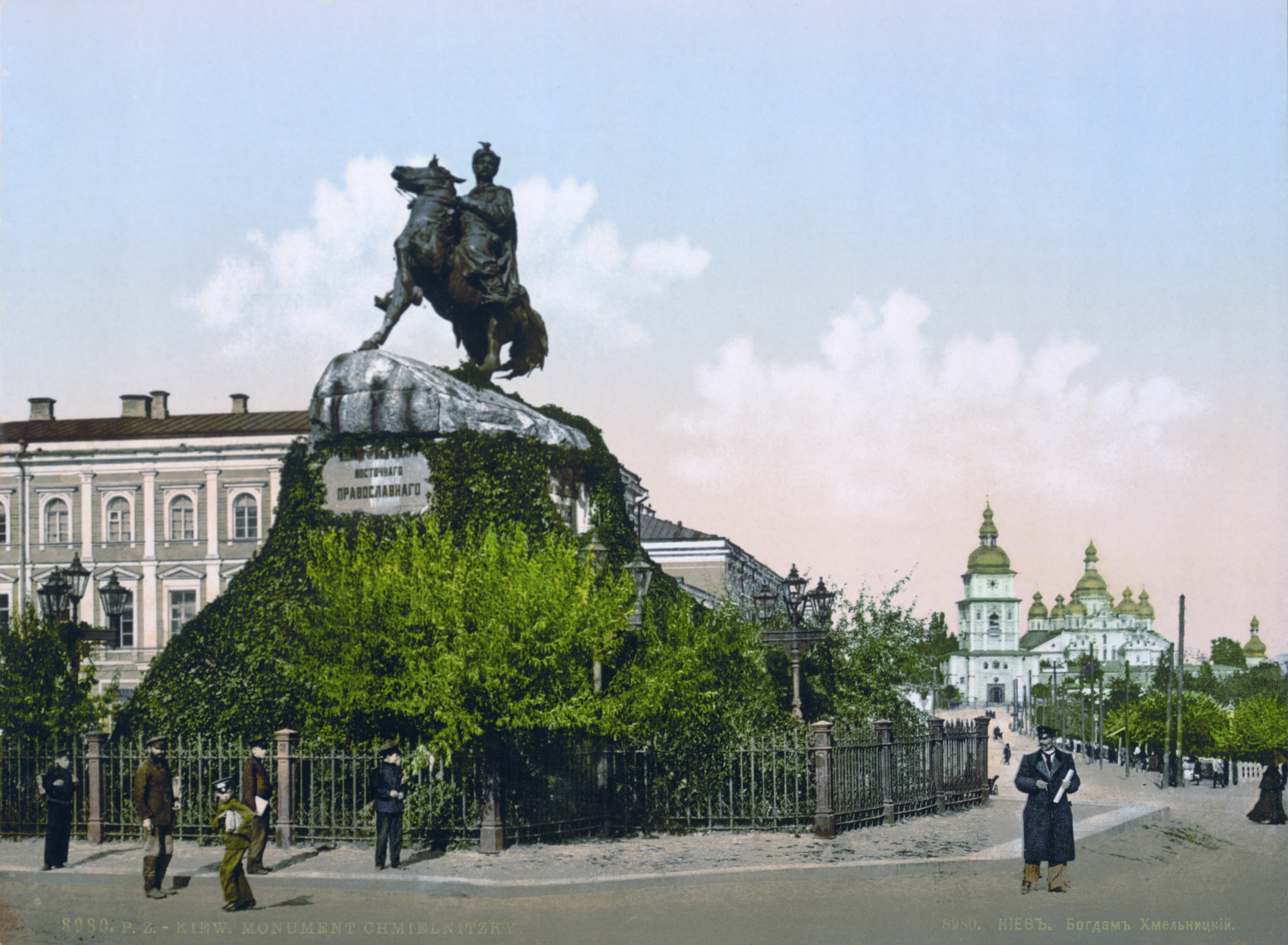
The Khmelnytsky Monument in Kiev in 1905

In modern Ukraine, Khmelnytsky is generally regarded as a national hero. A city and a region of the country bear his name. His image is prominently displayed on Ukrainian banknotes, and his monument in the centre of Kyiv is a focal point of the Ukrainian capital. Order of Bohdan Khmelnytsky is a military decoration in Ukraine (a different military award with the same name existed in the Soviet Union).

However, even in Ukraine this positive appreciation of his legacy is not unanimous. He is criticised for his union with Russia, which, in the view of some, proved disastrous for the future of the country. The prominent Ukrainian poet Taras Shevchenko was one of Khmelnytsky's most vocal and harsh critics. Others criticize him for his alliance with the Crimean Tatars, which permitted the latter to take a large number of Ukrainian peasants as slaves, as the Cossacks as a military caste did not protect the kholopy, the lowest stratum of the Ukrainian people. In 1649 alone, Crimean Tatars plundered up to 70 Ukrainian towns and hundreds of villages, taking as many as 40,000 inhabitants as slaves. Contemporary witnesses claim that members of Cossack starshyna directly oversaw that process, acting on the hetman's orders. In 1653, the khan received permission to take 100,000 captives in exchange for peace with the Polish authorities. Folk songs gathered by the 19th-century Ukrainian author Panteleimon Kulish in Khmelnytski's native region of Cherkasy cursed the hetman, depicting him as an ally of the Turks who facilitated the enslavement of the local inhabitants.

On balance, the view of his legacy in present-day Ukraine is more positive than negative, with some critics acknowledging that the union with Russia was dictated by necessity and an attempt to survive in those difficult times. In a 2018 poll by the Ukrainian polling organisation Rating, 73% of Ukrainian respondents had a positive view of Khmelnytsky.

=== Polish assessment ===
Poles called Khmelnytsky "The Whip of God" (also called "The Scourge of God"), which was a name previously given to Attila of the Huns who terrorised the Roman Empire. Khmelnytsky's role in the history of the Polish state has been viewed mostly in a negative light. The rebellion of 1648 proved to be the end of the Golden Age of the Commonwealth and the beginning of its demise. Although it survived the rebellion and the following war, within less than two hundred years it was divided amongst Russia, Prussia, and Austria in the partitions of Poland. Many Poles blamed Khmelnytsky for the decline of the Commonwealth.

In the 19th century, Khmelnytsky was depicted in several Polish works of fiction. The most notable treatment of him in Polish literature is found in Henryk Sienkiewicz's historical novel With Fire and Sword. The rather critical portrayal of Khmelnytsky by Sienkiewicz is moderated in the 1999 movie adaptation by Jerzy Hoffman.

=== Russian and Soviet historiography ===
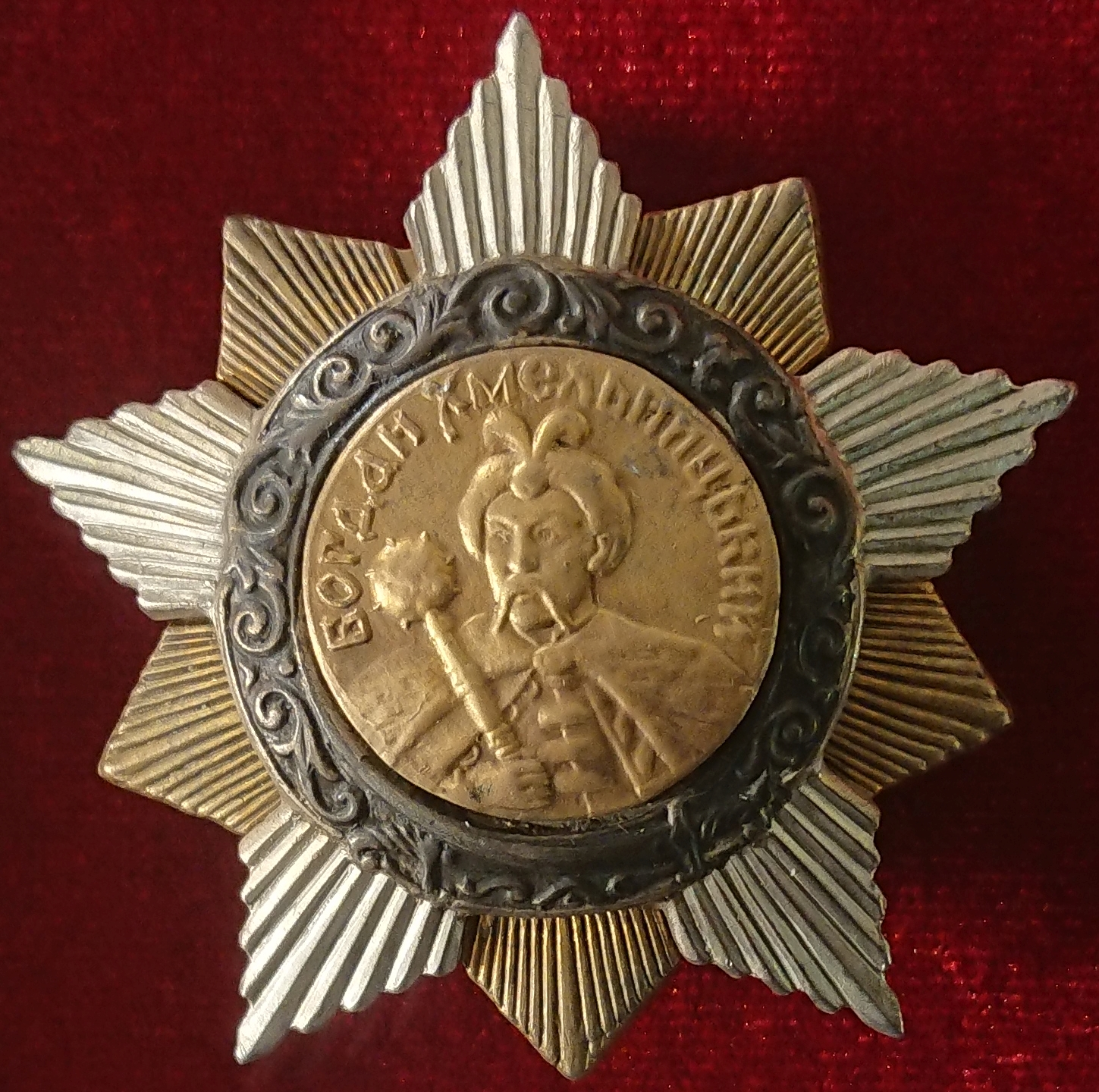
Order of Bohdan Khmelnytsky, introduced by the Soviet Union during the Second World War

The official Russian historiography stressed the fact that Khmelnytsky entered into a union with Moscow's Tsar Alexei Mikhailovich with an expressed desire to "re-unify" Ukraine with Russia. This view corresponded with the official theory of Moscow as the heir of the Kievan Rus', which appropriately gathered its former territories.

Khmelnytsky was viewed as a national hero of Russia for bringing Ukraine into the "eternal union" of all the Russias – Great (Russia), Little (Ukraine) and White (Belarus) Russia. As such, he was much respected and venerated during the existence of the Russian Empire. His role was presented as a model for all Ukrainians to follow: to aspire for closer ties with Great Russia. This view was expressed in a monument commissioned by the Russian nationalist Mikhail Yuzefovich, which was installed in the centre of Kiev in 1888.

Russian authorities decided the original version of the monument (created by Russian sculptor Mikhail Mikeshin) was too xenophobic; it was to depict a vanquished Pole noble, Jewish land administrator and a Catholic priest under the hooves of the horse. The inscription on the monument (since then removed) read: "To Bohdan Khmelnytsky from Russia, one and indivisible." Mikeshin also created the Millennium of Russia monument in Novgorod, which has Khmelnytsky shown as one of Russia's prominent figures.

Soviet historiography followed in many ways the Imperial Russian theory of re-unification while adding the dimension of class struggle to the story. Khmelnytsky was praised not only for re-unifying Ukraine with Russia, but also for organizing the class struggle of oppressed Ukrainian peasants against Polish exploiters.

=== Jewish historiography ===
Jews compared Khmelnytsky to Haman and later to Adolf Hitler. The assessment of Khmelnytsky in Jewish historiography is overwhelmingly negative because he used Jews as scapegoats and sought to eradicate them from Ukraine. The Khmelnytsky Uprising led to the deaths of an estimated 18,000–100,000 Jews. These estimates include deaths from starvation and disease. Jews were among those who were sold to the Crimean Tatars, as slaves, in exchange for Tatar cooperation with the Cossacks. Atrocity stories about massacre victims who had been buried alive, cut to pieces or forced to kill one another spread throughout Europe and beyond. The pogroms contributed to a revival of the ideas of Isaac Luria, who revered the Kabbalah, and the identification of Sabbatai Zevi as the Messiah. Orest Subtelny writes:

Between 1648 and 1656, tens of thousands of Jews—given the lack of reliable data, it is impossible to establish more accurate figures—were killed by the rebels, and to this day the Khmelnytsky uprising is considered by Jews to be one of the most traumatic events in their history.

=== Commemoration ===
- The Ukrainian city of Khmelnytskyi is named after Khmelnytsky.
- In most Ukrainian cities there are streets named after Bohdan Khmelnytskyi. There is also Bohdan Khmelnytskyi Avenue in the city of Dnipro.
- There are monuments to Khmelnytsky in Kyiv, Chyhyryn, Chernihiv, Khmelnytskyi, Cherkasy, Nikopol, Kropyvnytskyi, Zaporizhzhia, and Subotiv.
- The Separate Presidential Brigade "Hetman Bohdan Khmelnytskyi", a unit of the Armed Forces of Ukraine tasked with protecting the president of Ukraine, is named in honor of Khmelnytsky.
- The National Academy of the State Border Service of Ukraine is named after Khmelnytsky.
- The Bohdan Khmelnytsky Battalion, a Russian battalion allegedly formed from Ukrainian POWs is named in honor of Khmelnytsky.
- Two different military orders in the name of Khmelnytsky exist, which are:
  - Order of Bohdan Khmelnytsky
  - Order of Bogdan Khmelnitsky (Soviet Union)

== See also ==
- Soviet cruiser Chervona Ukraina – known as Hetman Bohdan Khmelnytsky 1918–1922
- Hetman of Zaporizhian Cossacks – further explores the office which Khmelnytsky held
- With Fire and Sword – a historical novel detailing the events of the Khmelnytsky Uprising

== Bibliography ==
- Magocsi, Paul Robert (2010). A History of Ukraine: The Land and Its Peoples (Second ed.). University of Toronto Press. ISBN 9781442610217.
- Yakovenko, Natalia (2006). Нарис історії середньовічної та ранньомодерної України [An Outline History of Medieval and Early Modern Ukraine] (in Ukrainian) (3rd ed.). Kyiv: Krytyka. ISBN 966-7679-82-9.
- Glaser, Amelia (2015). "Bohdan Khmelnytsky as Protagonist: Between Hero and Villain". In Glaser, Amelia (ed.). Stories of Khmelnytsky: Competing Literary Legacies of the 1648 Ukrainian Cossack Uprising. Stanford University Press. ISBN 978-0-8047-9496-1.
- Koropeckyj, Roman (2015). "The Image of Bohdan Khmelnytsky in Polish Romanticism and Its Post-Romantic Reflex". In Glaser, Amelia (ed.). Stories of Khmelnytsky: Competing Literary Legacies of the 1648 Ukrainian Cossack Uprising. Stanford University Press. ISBN 978-0-8047-9496-1.
- Kalinowska, Izabela; Kondratyuk, Marta (2015). "Khmelnytsky in Motion: The Case of Soviet, Polish, and Ukrainian film". In Glaser, Amelia (ed.). Stories of Khmelnytsky: Competing Literary Legacies of the 1648 Ukrainian Cossack Uprising. Stanford University Press. ISBN 978-0-8047-9496-1.
- Hrushevsky, Mykhailo (2002). History of Ukraine-Rus' Volume 8: The Cossack Age, 1626-1650. Translated by Olynyk, Marta Daria. ISBN 1-895571-32-4.
- Hrushevsky, Mykhailo (2005). History of Ukraine-Rus' Volume 9, Book 1: The Cossack Age, 1650-1653. Translated by Strumiński, Bohdan. ISBN 978-1895571493.
- Dashkevych, Yaroslav (2007). Постаті: нариси про діячів історії, політики культури [Personages: essays on persons in history, politics and culture] (in Ukrainian). Lviv. ISBN 978-966-441-031-8.
- Paliy, Oleksandr (2017). Історія України [A History of Ukraine] (in Ukrainian). Vol. 3. Kyiv: К.І.С. ISBN 978-617-684-166-1.
- Subtelny, Orest (2009). Ukraine: A History (4th ed.). University of Toronto Press. ISBN 978-1-4426-4016-0.
- Wójcik, Zbigniew (1973). "Czy Kozacy Zaporoscy byli na służbie Mazarina" [Were the Zaporozhian Cossacks in service of Mazarin] (PDF). Przegląd Historyczny (in Polish). 64 (3). Archived from the original on 6 June 2020.

| Preceded by Post created | Hetman of Ukraine; 1648–1657 | Succeeded by Yurii Khmelnytsky |
