= Helena Czaplińska =

Second wife of Bohdan Khmelnytsky (died 1651)

- Мотрона (Олена) Чаплинська (Ukrainian); Motrona (Helena) Chmielnicka (Polish)
- Born: Motrona
- Died: 1651; Chyhyryn
- Spouses: Daniel Czapliński, Bohdan Khmelnytsky

Helena Czaplińska (died 1651), was the second wife of Bohdan Khmelnytsky, Hetman of Zaporizhian Host (r. 1648–1657). She was an influential figure among the Zaporizhian Cossacks and known as "Helen of the Steppe". Initially married to Daniel Czapliński, her influence was seen as a threat as she was suspected to betray her second husband the hetman in favor of her loyalties of her former marriage. She was famously executed for treason by her stepson Tymofiy Khmelnytsky during the absence of her spouse.

== Biography ==
According to a widespread version of her biography, Helena's original name was Motrona and she was an orphan born to noble parents. Khmelnytskyi's family employed her as a nanny for their children, and after the death of Bohdan's first wife Hanna Motrona became his concubine. Once as Khmelnytskyi was absent, his neighbour Daniel Czapliński raided his homestead, plundering it, beating the owners's son and capturing Motrona, who was later forcibly married to Daniel under the Catholic name Helena.

After futile attempts to sue his neighbour in court, which ended with him receiving a humiliating compensation of 150 złotys, Khmelnytskyi was accused by Czapliński of preparing a revolt, and fled to Zaporozhian Sich. After the beginning of his uprising, the newly elected hetman sent his men to Chyhyryn, which prompted Czapliński to flee, leaving Helena. Soon thereafter she and Khmelnytskyi married with a special permission from the Orthodox Patriarch (a Catholic marriage couldn't be performed due to Helena's Catholic faith and the fact that her de-jure husband was still alive). In exchange the hetman reportedly paid the patriarch six horses and 1000 golden coins.

Helena's marriage to Khmelnytskyi was met with suspicion by Cossack starshyna, including the hetman's eldest son Tymofiy, who suspected her of treason and Catholic sympathies. In 1651, as Khmelnytskyi was campaigning, he ordered Tymofiy to lead an investigation into the disappearance of a large sum of money from the hetman's treasury. In the absence of his father, the latter accused his stepmother of having an affair with the treasurer and stealing the money.

Later, Chaplinsky will become the cause of her death, as the Cossacks will find his letters in which he orders to poison the hetman and bury the treasures.

In May 1651 Helena was executed on Tymofiy's orders, and her naked body was left to hang on the entrance of Khmelnytskyi's family estate in Subotiv. The news of his wife's execution dealt a heavy blow to the hetman, and could have contributed to his defeat at the Battle of Berestechko.
