= Tymofiy Khmelnytsky =

Zaporozhian Cossack military commander (1632-1653)

- Тимофій/Тиміш/Тимош Хмельницький
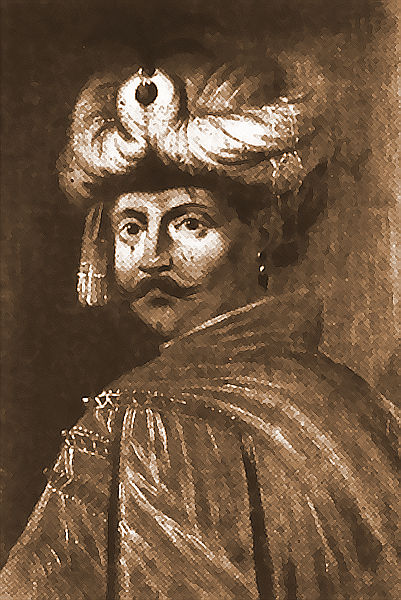
- Born: 1632; Subotiv, Kiev Voivodeship, Polish–Lithuanian Commonwealth
- Died: 15 September 1653 (aged 20–21); Suceava, Principality of Moldavia
- Parents: Bohdan Khmelnytsky (father); Hanna Somko (mother)

Tymofiy Khmelnytsky
- Coat of arms
- Noble family: Khmelnytsky family

Tymofiy Bohdanovych Khmelnytsky or Tymish Bohdanovych Khmelnytsky (Ukrainian: Тимофій, Тиміш, Тимош Хмельницький; 1632 — 15 September 1653), also known as Tymosh Khmelnychenko (Old Ukrainian: Тимош Хмельниченко) was a Zaporozhian Cossack military commander. He was the eldest son of the Ukrainian Cossack Hetman Bohdan Khmelnytsky.

He was married to the Moldavian princess Ruxandra Lupu, daughter of the Prince Vasile Lupu. He took part in the Battle of Finta as commander of the forces of the Zaporozhian Cossacks and after the defeat, Timofiy was besieged by the Wallachian forces in Suceava and died in the confrontation.

== Biography ==
=== Early life ===
He was born in 1632 in Subotiv. According to sources, Tymish was short, red and had freckles on his face. In February-March 1648, as a result of negotiations between Hetman Bohdan Khmelnytsky and the Crimean Khan İslâm III Giray and the conclusion of an agreement on a joint struggle against the Polish–Lithuanian Commonwealth, Tymish was left as a hostage in Bakhchisarai.

From 1648 Tymish was a Chyhyryn centurion and together with his father took part in the campaigns of the Ukrainian army in Galicia, the Battle of Zboriv in 1649, the Battle of Berestechko in 1651, the Battle of Batih in 1652, during which he distinguished himself by courage and bravery.

=== Involvement in Moldavian affairs ===
After the capture of the capital of the Moldavian principality by Iasi, the Ukrainian-Moldavian alliance was concluded, for the strengthening of which Tymish married the daughter of the Moldavan Prince Vasile Lupu - Ruxandra. This marriage is a very important fact, because thanks to this marriage the Khmelnytsky family was related to the most influential noble families of Eastern and Central Europe at that time - the Radziwills (Ivan Radziwill was married to Rozanda's sister), the Koniecpolski, Żółkiewski, Zbaraski and Wiśniowiecki, therefore, Bohdan Khmelnytsky in a sense became on the same social level with them.

The alliance of Ukraine with the Principality of Moldavia caused concern among the Transylvanian Prince George II Rákóczi and the Wallachian lord Matei Besarab, who, uniting with the detachments of the candidate for the Moldavian throne of Chancellor (logofet) Gheorghe Ștefan, started a war against Lupul.

=== Siege of Suceava ===
In April 1653, a combined force of Vasile Lupul's opponents captured Iasi and installed Georgica on the Moldavian throne. The Ukrainian army, led by Khmelnytsky, came to Lupul's aid and defeated Stefan Georgica's troops near Iasi on May 1-2, 1653. Trying to strengthen his success, Khmelnytsky launched an offensive on Wallachia, but on May 17 he was defeated at the Battle of Finta and was forced to retreat. Trying to help his father-in-law, whose troops were surrounded by joint Wallachian-Polish forces in the Suceava Fortress (now Romania), Tymish, led by a 9,000-strong Cossack detachment, broke into the city on August 10.

In the first decade of August, Hetman Bohdan sent a new Cossack corps to the Principality of Moldavia, led by his eldest son and son-in-law Vasile Lupu, Tymish Khmelnytsky.

On August 17 or 18, the Cossacks entered in Suceava. Tymish marched in several columns, ravaging the country in order to provoke Stefan to withdraw from Suceava, as well as not giving the opportunity to accurately locate the direction of the march of its main forces. As a result, Stefan lifted the siege and Tymish was able to enter Suceava, barely meeting resistance (the blocking detachment of 500 soldiers left by Stefan was easily defeated).

On August 21, George Stefan's army approached Suceava and tried to take the Cossack camp under the walls of the fortress. This attempt completely failed, because in the few days that passed from the arrival to Suceava, the Cossacks were able to build strong fortifications; the siege of the fortress began.

After the siege began, Tymish sent a letter to Bohdan Khmelnytsky asking for help. On August 29, Khmelnytsky received an alarming letter from his son requesting reinforcements. However, having only 10,000 soldiers in Chyhyryn (other regiments gathered near Bila Tserkva), he did not dare to send large forces to Suceava before the threat of an attack by the Poles (several thousand Cossacks could not save the situation). Therefore, he wrote back to Tymish that he could not send reinforcements at the moment and advised him to defend himself. Sources say that after that the hetman sent universals to the officers three times with an order to gather to help the besieged in Suceava, but they did not want to do it. In the second decade of September, only two regiments of Cossacks gathered in Rashkov.

The heaviest fighting took place on September 10-12, when the Cossacks tried to break through the siege. This efficiency was most likely due to the fact that the blockade began to show in the fortress - food and gunpowder were running out, and water was running out. In addition, the Cossacks could decide that Dengoff's detachment, which had arrived in the first decade of September, was only the vanguard of a larger army.

Tymish formed a strike group of up to 5,000 soldiers and directed the main blow at the positions of the Semigorodites. The Cossacks managed to break into the shafts and even seize several guns, but during the counterattack the Cossacks were repulsed. This led to some confusion among the Cossacks, so the siege command decided to use this moment for a general assault.

The assault began on the afternoon of September 11 and lasted 3 hours. Dengoff's fresh dragoons managed to break into the Cossack ramparts, but they were knocked out by the defenders. The Cossacks did not use firearms - it seems that they were running out of gunpowder. The attackers suffered very heavy losses: 1,500 Moldavians, Wallachians and Semigorodites, and 800 Poles. Eyewitnesses wrote that Polish corpses completely filled the shaft in front of the Cossack trenches. The Polish dragoons survived only one captain, and all other officers were killed. Quarrels broke out between the Poles and their allies over who was to blame for the defeat of the assault.

The Cossacks failed to use their great success. Although the next night they tried to destroy the blockhouse in front of the Polish trenches, and almost succeeded in attacking it suddenly in the dark, the defenders were able to hold out (including hand grenades) to the approach of their cavalry, which drove the Cossacks to their camp.

=== Death ===
During one of the attacks against the Cossack force in Suceava, Tymish Khmelnytsky was mortally wounded by enemy fire. Under protection of a mobile camp, the Cossacks were eventually able to break out of the city after a two-month siege; the relief force sent by Bohdan Khmelnytsky arrived too late, and Cossack troops marched back into Ukraine. Tymish's body was brought to the hetman's capital at Chyhyryn, arriving there on 30 October, accompanied with cannon salvos.

== Legacy ==
Tymish's untimely death brought an end to his father's dynastic plans in Moldavia. Remembered as a desperate and brave warrior, Bohdan's elder son was at the same time criticized for his emotional instability, tendency to agitation and stubbornness.
