= Zaporozhian Host =

Armed forces in part of today-Ukraine, XV-XVIII

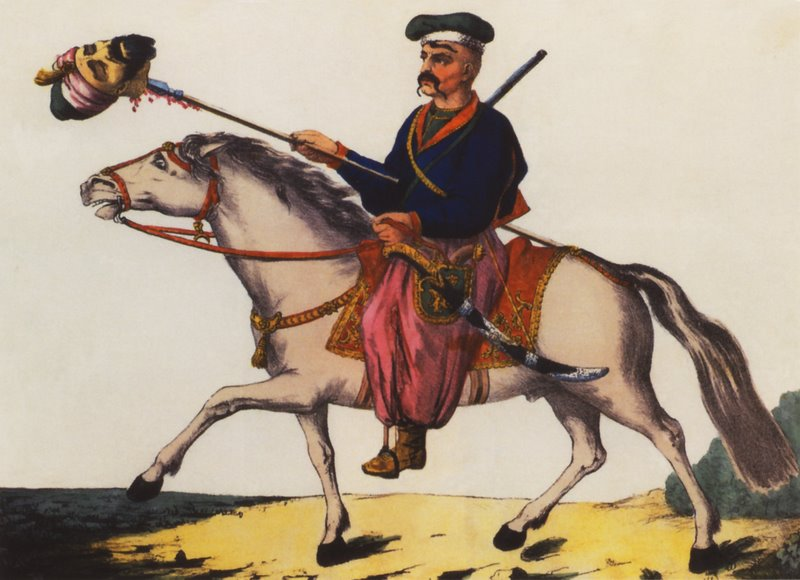
Lithograph of a Ukrainian Cossack with a head of a Tatar man, created in the 18th century

The Zaporozhian Host (Note: Ukrainian: Військо Запорозьке, romanized: Vijśko Zaporoźke, IPA: [ˈʋʲii̯sʲko zɐpoˈrɔzʲke]) or Zaporizhian Host (Note: Ukrainian: Військо Запорізьке, romanized: Vijśko Zaporiźke, IPA: [ˈʋʲii̯sʲko zɐpoˈrizʲke]) is a term for a military force inhabiting or originating from Zaporizhzhia—the territory in what is now Southern and Central Ukraine, beyond the rapids of the Dnieper River, from the 15th to the 18th centuries.

== Territories ==
- Zaporozhian Sich, a semi-autonomous Cossack polity in the 16th–18th centuries, also referred to as the Zaporizhian Host, Lower (Viisko Zaporozke Nyzove).
- Cossack Hetmanate, the Land of Cossacks of Ukraine in Central Ukraine, initially centered in Chyhyryn and associated with the Zaporozhian Sich, also referred to as the Zaporizhian Host, Urban (Viisko Zaporozke Horodove)
- Zaporozhian Cossacks, generally
  - Registered Cossacks, were Zaporizhian warriors who were recorded as cossacks in official registries of the Polish-Lithuanian Commonwealth between 1572 and 1699
