= Ukrainians in Sweden =

Ukrainians in Sweden українці у Швеції
Total population
- 12,891 (by birth)

Languages
- Ukrainian, Russian, Swedish

Religion
- Orthodox and Jewish minorities

Related ethnic groups
- Other Ukrainians

The Ukrainians in Sweden (Swedish: Ukrainare i Sverige; Ukrainian: українці у Швеції, romanized: ukrayintsi u Shvetsiyi) refers to Swedish citizens of Ukrainian descent, or Ukraine-born people who emigrated to Sweden. They are an ethnic minority in Sweden. The Ukrainian diaspora present in Sweden used to constitute a relatively small migrant group compared to other groups of European descent. However the number of Ukrainian asylum seekers in Sweden increased considerably following the 2022 Russian invasion of Ukraine.

== History ==
In 1654 an embassy of the Cossack Hetmanate arrived to Stockholm for negotiations concerning a joint campaign against Poland. Between 1715 and 1720 hetman Pylyp Orlyk and his retunue resided in Sweden after being exiled from Ukraine following the Russian victory over Ukrainian-Swedish forces at Poltava. The hetman's son Grégoire Orlyk received his education at Lund University. Anna Voynarovska-Myrovych, the wife of another Ukrainian émigré, Andriy Voynarovsky, resided in Tynnelsö Castle near Stockholm until the 1740s.

During the late 19th and early 20th century many female Ukrainian labourers from Galicia travelled to Sweden in order to find employment in agriculture. Part of them stayed in the country and assimilated. During the First World War, a branch of the Union for the Liberation of Ukraine was active in Stockholm. In 1916 a Ukrainian informational bureau was established in the city. In 1918-1919 a diplomatic mission of the Ukrainian People's Republic was active in the Swedish capital.

During the Interwar period a number of Ukrainians fleeing from the Soviet regime reached Sweden through Finland. In 1944 they were followed by Ukrainian deportees from Karelia. Following the war, many Ukrainian prisoners from concentration camps and Ostarbeiter were brought to Sweden by the Red Cross. Some Ukrainian refugees from Poland and Yugoslavia also arrived during that time. Part of the migrants later moved to the United States and Canada. In total, around 2,000 Ukrainians lived in Sweden during the postwar period, most of them in the southern part of the country. In 1947 a Ukrainian community organization (hromada) was established in Stockholm. Additional community organizations were active in Malmö and Örebro. During the 1950s and 1960s a Ukrainian academical club existed in Stockholm.

In 1999, there were 1,200 Ukrainians (born in Ukraine) in Sweden. By 2021 that number had risen to 12,900. In 2010, the majority of Ukrainian nationals were women.

== Notable people ==
- Marina Schiptjenko
- Pylyp Orlyk
- Hanna Hertsyk

== See also ==
- Embassy of Ukraine, Stockholm
- Sweden–Ukraine relations
- Immigration to Sweden
- Ukrainian diaspora
- Russians in Sweden
- Ukrainians in Finland
