= Russians in Sweden =

Total population
- 26,680 (Russia-born residents, 31 December 2025)

Languages
- Swedish, Russian

According to Statistics Sweden, 26,680 people born in Russia were registered as residents of Sweden on 31 December 2025. Russian immigrant women in Sweden were the most highly educated immigrants in Sweden as of 2009.

The Russian Orthodox Church in Sweden has parishes in the cities of Gothenburg, Stockholm, Västerås, Uppsala, Karlstad, Umeå and Luleå, where many Russian first and second generation immigrants live. Most of them arrived in Sweden in the 1920s after the Russian Civil War. During World War II, the Polish resistance movement organized escapes of some Russian prisoners of war who fled from German POW camps in German-occupied Poland to Sweden by sea. Another small wave came after World War II. An increasing number of Russians and others from the former Soviet Union have moved to Sweden since the 1990s, with more than 900 per year receiving Swedish citizenship since 2011.

In the Swedish news media, a Russian-Swedish perspective is sometimes given by Lioudmila Siegel, who is the chairperson of the Russian National Association (Swedish: Ryska riksförbundet). During the Russian presidential election in 2012, she identified herself as a supporter of President Vladimir Putin and she rejected accusations of election fraud.

The Russian National Association has close connections to the Russian embassy in Stockholm, and regularly arranges events together with it. It organised an exhibition about Russian women in Sweden called "The Russian Bride – An Ordinary Woman", which aimed to challenge stereotypes of Russian-speaking women as mail-order brides or prostitutes. The Russian National Association was founded on 18 October 2003. In 2008 the National Association consisted of 20 local associations. In 2009 it joined SIOS, the Cooperation Group for Ethnic Associations in Sweden.

Russians opposed to the war in Ukraine have also organised in Sweden. The Swedish-based association Russians Against War consists mainly of Russian exiles and has held protests against the war. In December 2022, Russian authorities designated it an "undesirable organisation". During the 2024 Russian presidential election, people queued outside the Russian embassy in Stockholm at noon in a protest against Vladimir Putin; participants included a member of the association.

== Notable Russian Swedes ==
- Adelaide von Skilondz, Russian-Swedish opera singer
- Alibek Aliev, Russian-Swedish footballer.
- Khamzat Chimaev, Chechen-born Swedish freestyle wrestler and mixed martial artist
- Alexandra Dahlström, Swedish actress.
- Anna Riwkin-Brick, Swedish photographer.
- Alexander Jeremejeff, Swedish footballer.
- Christian Rubio Sivodedov, Swedish footballer.
- Dominika Peczynski, Polish-Swedish singer, model and television host born to a Polish father and a Russian Jewish mother.
- Emanuel Nobel, Russian-born Swedish businessman.
- Evgeny Agrest, Soviet-born Swedish chess grandmaster.
- Eugen Semitjov, Swedish journalist, author, and artist.
- Pyotr Gitselov, football manager
- Hjalmar Mehr, Mayor of Stockholm between 1958 and 1966 and 1970 to 1971.
- Israel Shamir, Soviet-born Swedish controversial writer and journalist.
- Johannes Wahlström, Swedish writer and filmmaker, son of Israel Shamir.
- sv:Keyyo, Swedish video-bloggers.
- Marta Helena Nobel-Oleinikoff, Russian-born Swedish physician and philanthropist.
- Michael Tendler, Russian-Swedish Physicist.
- Michael Nobel, Swedish entrepreneur.
- Natalia Dubrovinskaia, Russian-Swedish geologist.
- Nicolai Gedda, Swedish operatic tenor.
- the Pereswetoff-Morath, family.
- Sofia Kovalevskaya, Russian mathematician
- Sophie Tolstoy, Swedish actress.
- Viktoria Tolstoy, Swedish jazz singer.
- Vladimir Mazya, Russian-born Swedish mathematician.

== See also ==
- Russians
- Russian diaspora
- Russia–Sweden relations
- Demographics of Sweden
- Russians in Finland
- Ukrainians in Sweden
