= Hertsyk =

Hertsyk is a Ukrainian surname associated with the Ukrainian Cossack Hertsyk family of Christianized Ashkenazi Jewish origin. Russified forms: Gertsyk, Gertsik. Notable people with the surname include:

- Adelaida Gertsyk (1874–1925), Russian translator, poet and writer
- Eugenia Gertsyk (1878–1944), Russian translator and literary figure
- Hanna Hertsyk (died c. 1752), wife of Ukrainian Hetman Pylyp Orlyk
- Pavlo Hertsyk (died c. 1700), colonel of the Poltava Regiment
- Rostyslav Hertsyk (born 1989), Ukrainian fencer
