= Tendler =

Tendler is a predominantly Yiddish derived Ashkenazi Jewish surname originating in-part to Bessarabia (now Moldova) in the region previously known as the Pale of Settlement. Until the 19th century, in the Bavarian-Austrian region, Tendler was a professional name for small and haberdashery traders as well as itinerant peddlers or traveling traders. Notable individuals with the surname include:

- Annamarie Tendler, American multimedia artist known for her work in photography and textiles
- Keren Tendler (died 2006), Israeli first female helicopter flight mechanic
- Lew Tendler (1898–1970), American boxer
- Michael Tendler (born 1947), Russian-Swedish physicist
- Moshe David Tendler, rabbi and biology professor, expert in Jewish medical ethics
- Saul Tendler, British pharmacy academic
- Silvio Tendler (1950–2025), Brazilian filmmaker
- Susan Tendler, American rabbi
