= Sweden–Ukraine relations =

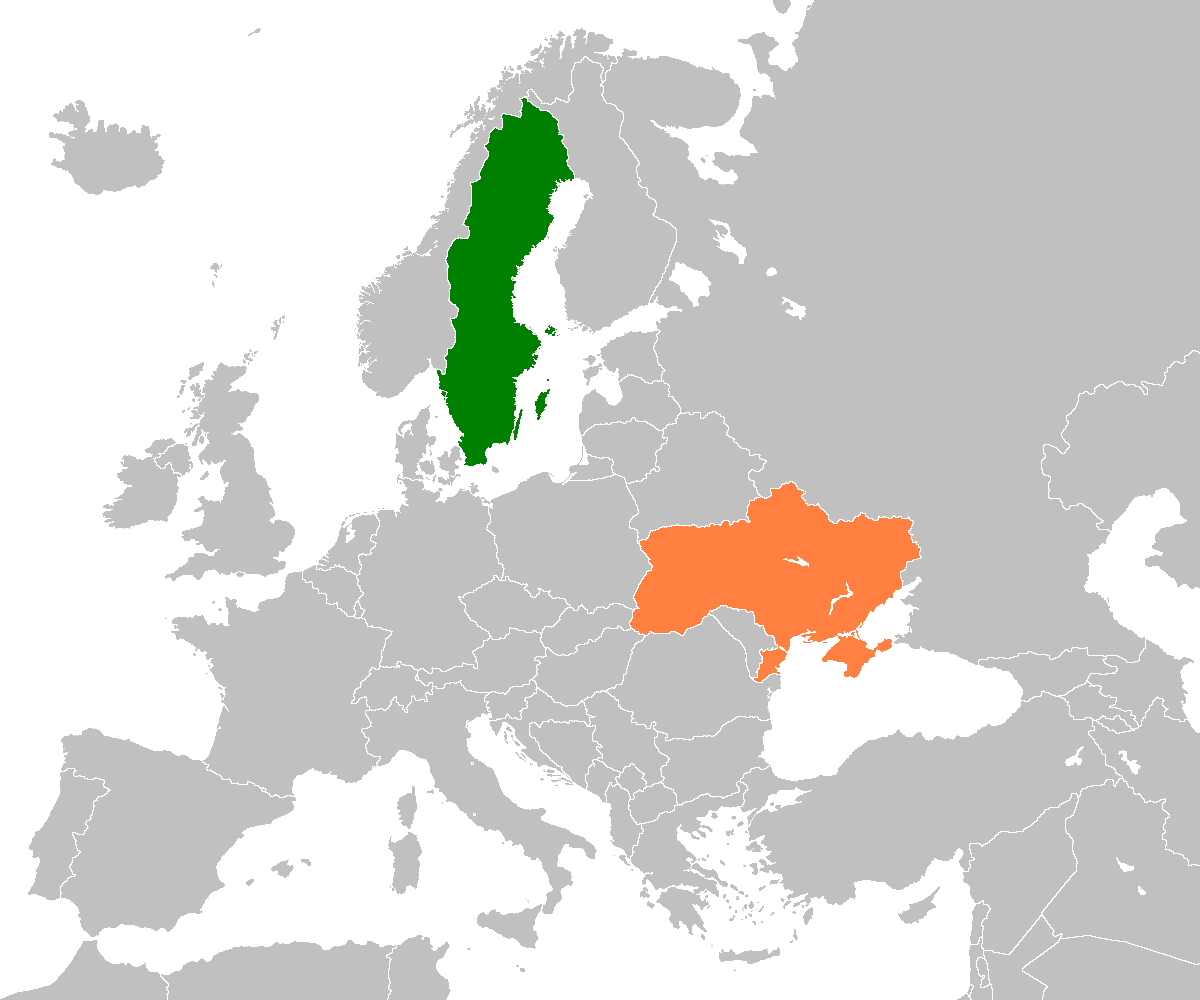
- Sweden: Ukraine

Diplomatic mission
- Embassy of Sweden, Kyiv: Embassy of Ukraine, Stockholm

Sweden–Ukraine relations are foreign relations between Sweden and Ukraine. Diplomatic relations between the two countries were established on 13 January 1992. Sweden has an embassy in Kyiv and an honorary consulate in Kakhovka. Ukraine has an embassy in Stockholm. Sweden is a member of the NATO and the European Union which Ukraine applied for in 2022. Both countries are members of the OSCE, Council of Europe, World Trade Organization and United Nations.

== Historical relations ==
The first documented contacts between the people of Scandinavia and the Slavic territories of Ukraine are the Varangian journeys to what they called Garðaríki. One of these Varangians was Rurik who according to the Primary Chronicle was the founder of the Rurik Dynasty which ruled Kievan Rus until the 14th century. Relations between the Swedish kings and Kievan Rus were close for many centuries and Yaroslav I the Wise was also married to king Olof Skötkonung's daughter Ingigerd Olofsdotter.

According to the Normanist theory, the Kievan Rus is thought to have adopted its name from the Varangian elite, which was first mentioned in the 830s in the Annals of Saint Bertan. The Annals recount that Holy Roman Emperor Louis II's court at Ingelheim, in 839 (the same year as the first appearance of Varangians in Constantinople), was visited by a delegation from the Byzantine emperor. The delegates included two men who called themselves "Rhos" ("Rhos vocari dicebant"). Louis inquired about their origins and learned that they were Swedes. Fearing that they were spies for their brothers, the Danes, he incarcerated them. They were also mentioned in the 860s by Byzantine Patriarch Photius under the name, "Rhos."

=== Alliance with Bohdan Khmelnytsky ===
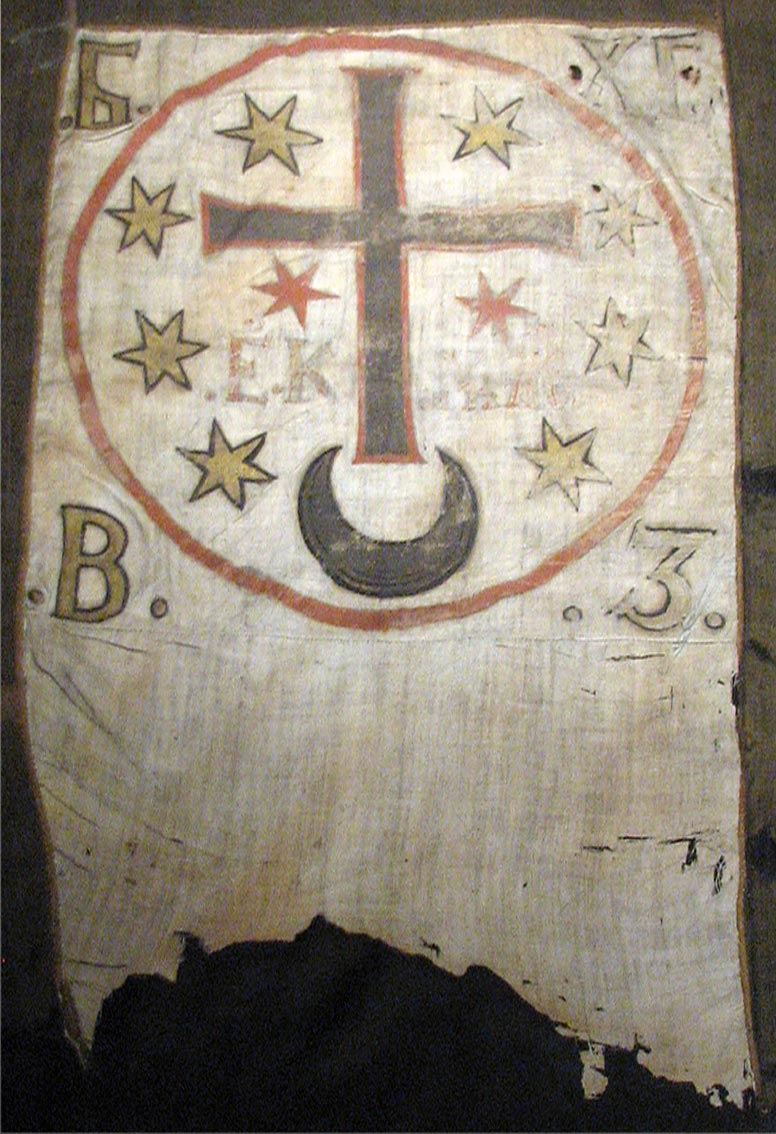
Bohdan Khmelnytsky's banner that was taken at the battle of Berestechko. It was later taken by the Swedes in Warsaw 1655 and is now to be seen at Armémuseum, Stockholm, Sweden.

An alliance between Sweden and Hetman Bohdan Khmelnytsky against Poland was negotiated several times between 1651 and 1657. After the 1656 peace in Vilnius between Muscovy and Poland Hetman Bohdan Khmelnytsky was infuriated and wrote to the tsar Alexis I of Russia: The Swedes are the honest people; when they pledge friendship and alliance, they honor their word. However, the Tsar, in establishing an armistice with the Poles and in wishing to return us into their hands, has behaved most heartlessly with us. Even after the Treaty of Pereyaslav in 1654 Hetman Bohdan Khmelnytsky continued to negotiate with the Swedes and in late 1655 his ambassador made proposals to the Swedish king Charles X Gustav to accept Ukraine as a Swedish vassal state and promised him the faithful service of the entire Zaporozhian Host.

Finally an agreement was signed between Sweden and three Ukrainian commanders (Ivan Bohun, the leader of the Ukrainian Protestants Yuri Nemyrych and Ivan Kovalivsky) on 6 October 1657 in Korsun where Sweden acknowledged the Ukrainian borders all the way to Wisła in the west and Prussia in the north. But by then Bohdan Khmelnytsky had died one month earlier and after the Swedes had left Poland for military campaigns in Denmark the proposed alliance died.

=== Alliance with Ivan Mazepa ===
During the Great Northern War Sweden and Hetman Ivan Mazepa formed an alliance in 1708 against Peter I of Russia. But after the defeat at Poltava on 28 June 1709, parts of the Swedish army under king Charles XII and Hetman Ivan Mazepa together with his loyal cossacks had to flee to Bender in Ottoman Turkey where Mazepa soon died. Pylyp Orlyk was then chosen as a Hetman in exile by the cossacks and the Swedish king Charles XII. While in Bender Pylyp Orlyk wrote one of the first state constitutions in Europe. This constitution was confirmed by Charles XII and it also names him as the protector of Ukraine.

After several unsuccessful raids into Ukraine Hetman Pylyp Orlyk together with several other cossacks followed the Swedish king Charles XII to Sweden in 1716. Hetman Pylyp Orlyk with his wife Hanna Hertsyk and seven children now lived in the city of Kristianstad for some years. Among the other Ukrainian refugees that resided in Kristianstad and Stockholm 1716–1720 can be mentioned Ivan Mazepa's nephew Andriy Voynarovskyi's wife Hanna Myrovych, General Osaul Hryhory Hertsyk, Ivan Hertsyk, judge general Klyment Dolhopoly, Fedir Myrovych, Fedir Tretiak and an orthodox priest named Parfeniy. Pylyp Orlyk and his family left Stockholm in 1720 but as late as 1747 his widow and children received financial support from the Riksdag of Sweden.

=== Founding of Gammalsvenskby ===
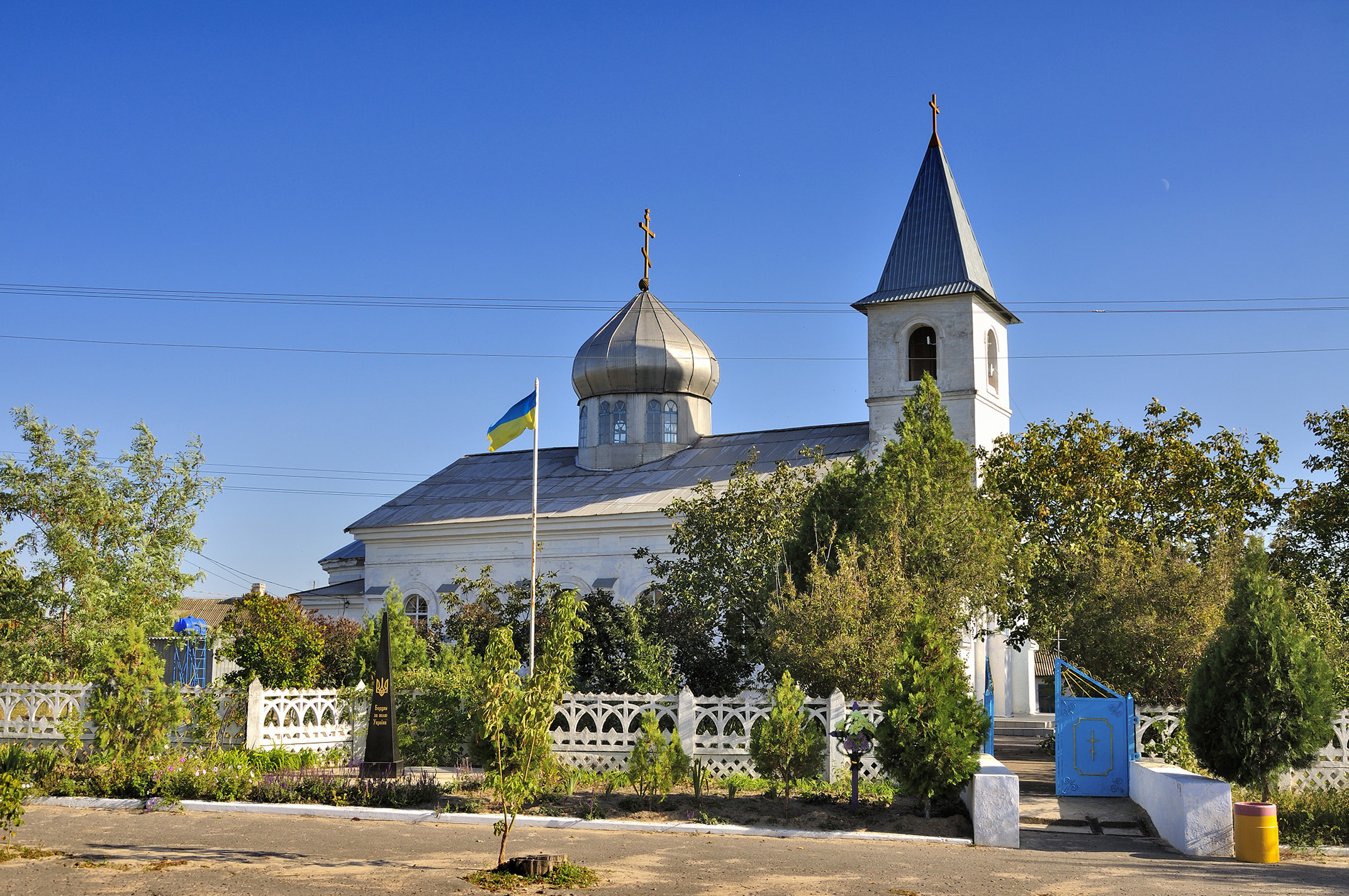
Former Swedish church in Gammalsvenskby

In 1782 a Swedish village was founded in the newly conquered lands of New Russia. The Swedish-speaking settlers of about 1000 came from the island of Dagö (Estonian: Hiiumaa) in present-day Estonia. Many of them died during the nine-month-long walk from their native island to what would become their new village. It's believed that they were more or less forced to move there by Catherine II of Russia. The new village was called Svenskbyn (The Swedish Village), but after German settlers had come to the area the name of the village was changed to Gammalsvenskby (Old Swedish Village).

A Swedish Lutheran church was built in 1885 and the contact with Sweden was in many ways kept through the church. But after the revolution the situation for the Swedish-speaking villagers turned to the worse and in 1929 most of them (about 900) emigrated to Sweden. But after arriving in Sweden many were disappointed and had problems adjusting to Swedish way of living. Many decided to emigrate to Canada where many villagers had emigrated already in the early 1900s. But about 240 villagers decided to return to Gammalsvenskby. There they soon suffered badly during The Great Terror in the 1930s.

Today there are very few Swedish-speaking villagers left in Gammalsvenskby. And today it's no longer a village by itself but a part of the village Zmiyivka (Ukrainian: Зміївка) in Kherson Oblast, Ukraine.

There is a museum about the Swedes from Gammalsvenskby in Roma, Gotland, where many of the villagers settled after returning to Sweden.

=== Relations during the 20th century ===
A Ukrainian information bureau was opened 1916 in Stockholm by Volodymyr Stepankivskyi and M. Zaliznyak. In 1918 an official diplomatic mission from the Ukrainian People's Republic headed by K. Lossky was opened in Stockholm.

During and after World War II about 2500 Ukrainian refugees made their way to Sweden, although many of them continued to the US and Canada in fear of being extradited to the Soviet Union. Those who stayed in Sweden founded a Ukrainian Society in Sweden in 1947. In the 1950s they also started a Ukrainian information center in Stockholm headed by Bohdan Kentrschynskyj.

Sweden supports Ukraine's aspirations to join the European Union. Sweden condemned the Russian occupation of Crimea in 2014 and the violence against Ukraine by Russian forces.

==== Russian Invasion of Ukraine ====
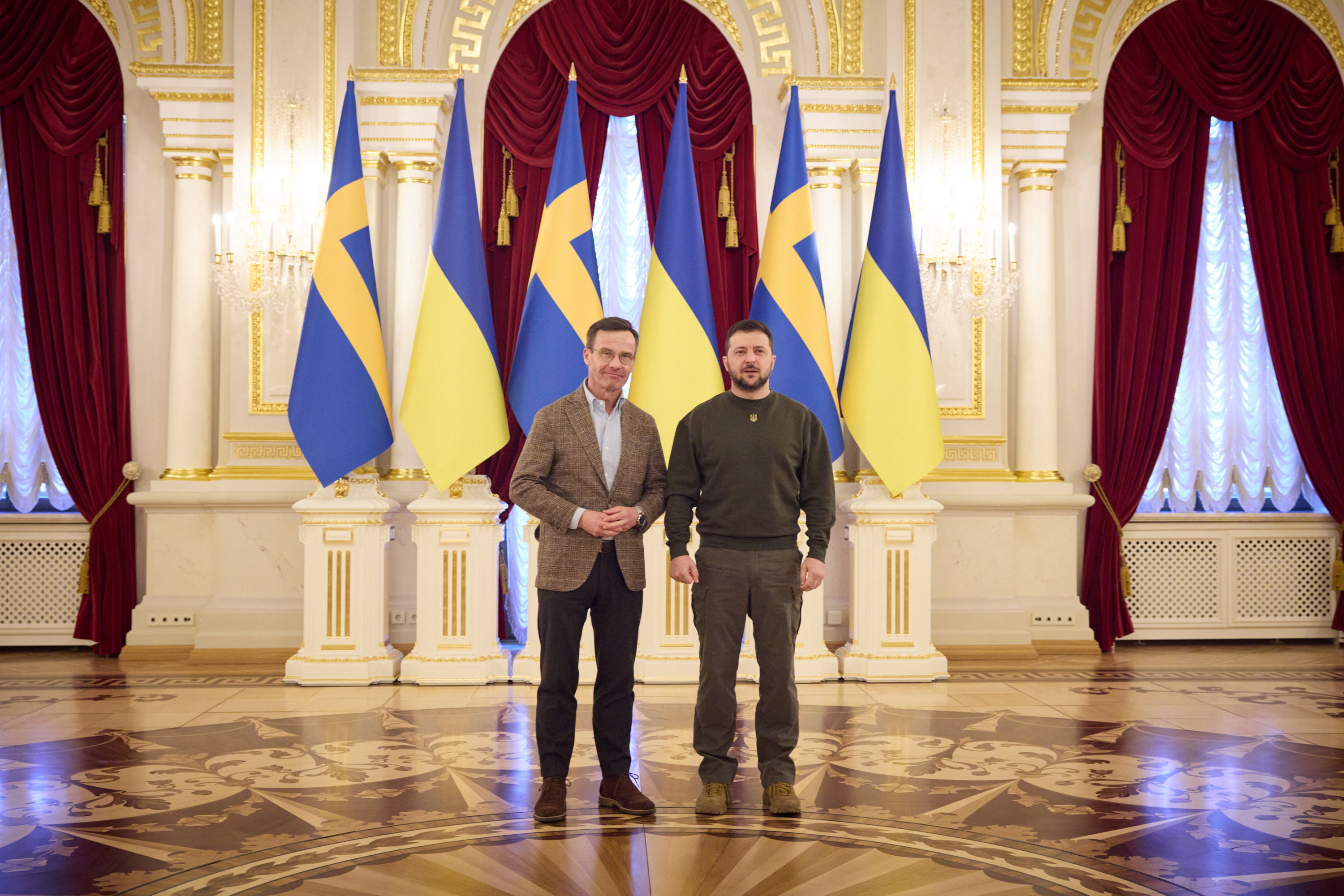
Swedish Prime Minister Ulf Kristersson with Ukrainian President Volodymyr Zelenskyy in Kyiv, 15 February 2023

Sweden condemned the invasion of Ukraine by Russian president Vladimir Putin and voted against Russia in the United Nations resolution to condemn the invasion. Due to the invasion, Sweden announced it would raise military spending citing the lack of security for the nation, and the country also announced it would be supporting Ukraine's resistance by sending 5,000 anti-tank weapons. Analysts for western media speculate that the defense budget increase would encourage both Sweden and neighboring Finland, the former of which has traditionally been neutral, to join NATO, which has only been supported by new polls showing a newfound majority of Swedes support their country joining the military alliance and that both countries have participated alongside NATO in recent military exercises.

== Economic relations ==
So far the most successful and best known Swedish company in Ukraine is the food processing company Chumak (Ukrainian: Чумак) in Kakhovka, Kherson Oblast. It is today one of Ukraine's biggest food companies. It was founded in 1996 by two young Swedish entrepreneurs with financial help of Hans Rausing of Tetra Pak.

Swedish banks have in recent years started to show a growing interest in the expanding Ukrainian economy. In early 2005 SEB bought AGIO Bank (Ukrainian: АЖІО банк) that later was transformed into SEB Bank (Ukraine) and in late 2007 SEB bought Factorial Bank (Ukrainian: Факторіал-Банк) with offices in Kharkiv and eastern Ukraine. This bank is planned to be incorporated in SEB Bank (Ukraine). Today SEB has 85 offices in Ukraine, but the plan is to open additional 20–25 offices per year so it will reach about 300 offices in the coming years.

In mid-2007 Swedbank bought TAS-Komerzbank (Ukrainian: ТАС-Комерцбанк) that in December 2007 changed its name to Swedbank (Ukrainian: Сведбанк). Currently this bank has 190 offices all over Ukraine.

The Swedish furniture retail giant IKEA has for many years planned to open its own store and MEGA shopping mall in Kyiv, similar to the ones in Moscow, but has been delayed due to a dispute over land. Instead it seems like a store will be opened in Odesa in the near future. But IKEA has been active in Ukraine for many years through different suppliers to its furnitures, mainly through its affiliate Swedwood with office in Uzhhorod.

== Twinnings ==
- (Sweden) Eskilstuna Municipality and (Ukraine) Lviv
- (Sweden) Gotland Municipality and (Ukraine) Gammalsvenskby
- (Sweden) Lund Municipality and (Ukraine) Rivne
- (Sweden) Stockholm Municipality and (Ukraine) Kyiv

== Resident diplomatic missions ==
- Sweden has an embassy in Kyiv.
- Ukraine has an embassy in Stockholm.
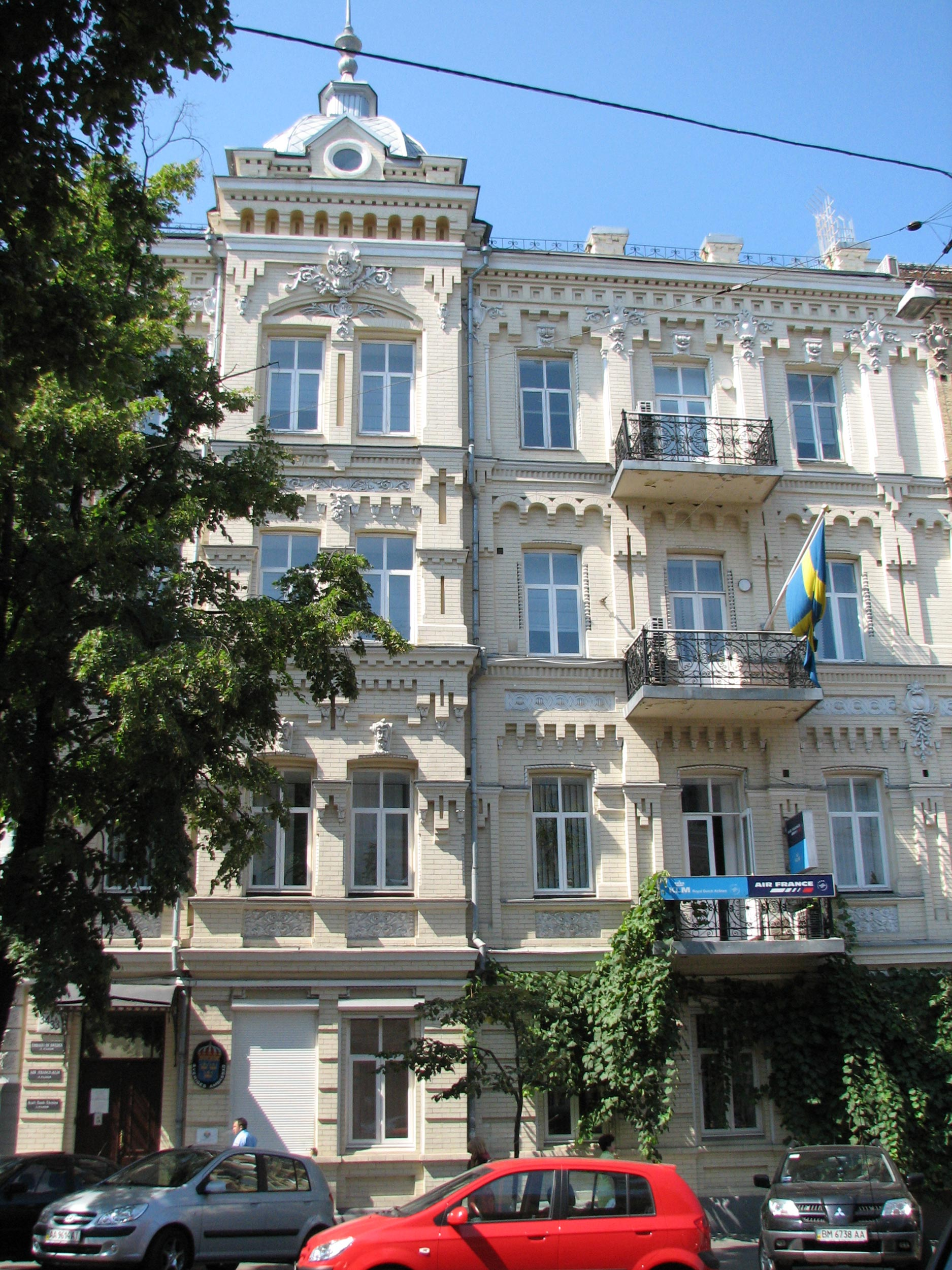
Embassy of Sweden in Kyiv

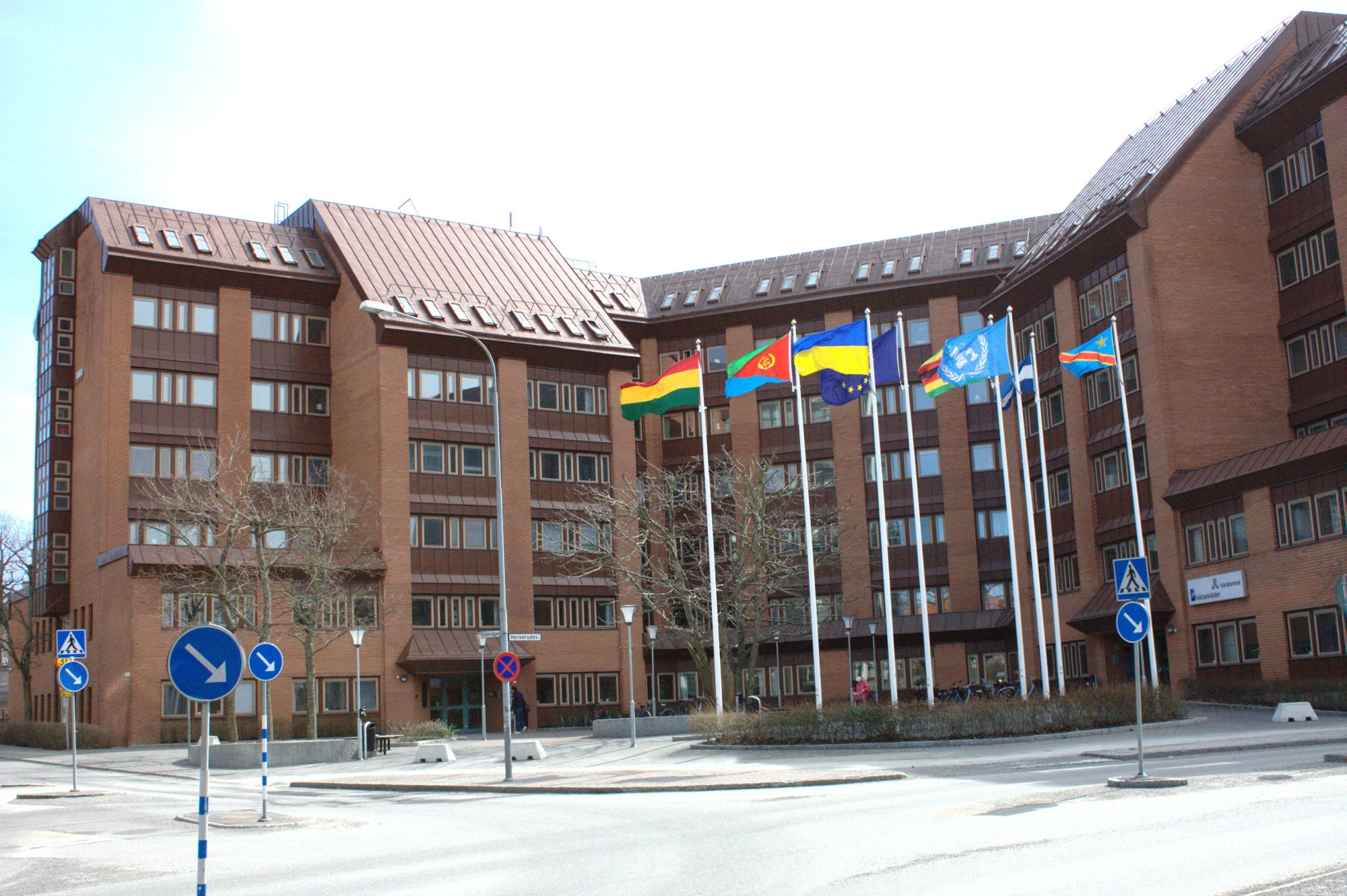
Embassy of Ukraine in Stockholm

== See also ==
- List of ambassadors of Sweden to Ukraine
- Foreign relations of Sweden
- Foreign relations of Ukraine
- Swedes of Gammalsvenskby
- Ukrainians in Sweden
