= Russia–Sweden relations =

- Russia: Sweden

Diplomatic mission
- Embassy of Russia, Stockholm: Embassy of Sweden, Moscow

Russia–Sweden relations date back to the 10th century; when Vikings called Varangians participated in the founding of new states that later evolved into Russia, Ukraine and Belarus.

== History ==
Historically the two countries have been connected since ancient days, when Swedish Vikings traded on the big Russian rivers and settled in Slavic settlements that later became large cities such as Novgorod and Kyiv. These settlements gave rise to mutual bonds that were also dynastical, as a Varangian king (Rurik) started a dynasty that came to rule uninterruptedly from the 9th to 16th century as depicted in the Nestor's chronicle. Even the name Russia is derived from Varangians as the old name for Vikings in the east were Rus.

=== Wars ===
During the Middle Ages several wars were fought between the Swedes and Russians, and eleven wars have been fought between Russia and Sweden since the 12th century.

The central theme of the 1600–1725 era was the struggle between Sweden and Russia for control of the Baltic, as well as territories around it. Russia was ultimately the winner, and as a result Sweden lost its status as a major power. In 1610 the Swedish army marched into Moscow under the command of Jakob De la Gardie. From 1623 to 1709, Swedish policy, particularly under Gustavus Adolphus (1611–32) and Charles XII (1697–1718), encouraged and militarily supported Ukrainian opposition to Muscovite Russian hegemony. Gustavus Adolphus fought the Ingrian War against Russia. It ended in 1617 with the Treaty of Stolbovo, which excluded Russia from the Baltic Sea. Sweden's most dramatic defeat on the battleground came in 1709 at the battle of Poltava, in an attempt to second the Ukrainian rebellion leader Mazepa. In these wars superior Russian forces often outnumbered Swedes, which however often stood their ground in battles such as those of Narva (1700) and Svensksund (1790) due to Sweden's capable military organization.

==== Great Northern War ====
In 1700, a triple alliance of Denmark–Norway, Saxony–Poland–Lithuania and Russia launched a threefold attack on the Swedish protectorate of Swedish Holstein-Gottorp and on the Swedish provinces of Livonia and Ingria, aiming to take advantage while Sweden was unaligned and ruled by a young and inexperienced king. Thus began the Great Northern War of 1700 to 1721. Leading the Swedish army against the alliance, King Charles XII won multiple victories - despite being usually significantly outnumbered. A major Swedish victory over a Russian army some three times the size in 1700 at the Battle of Narva compelled Tsar Peter I to sue for peace, which Charles then rejected. In 1706 Swedish forces under general Carl Gustav Rehnskiöld defeated a combined army of Saxony and Russia at the Battle of Fraustadt. Russia now remained the sole remaining anti-Swedish hostile power.

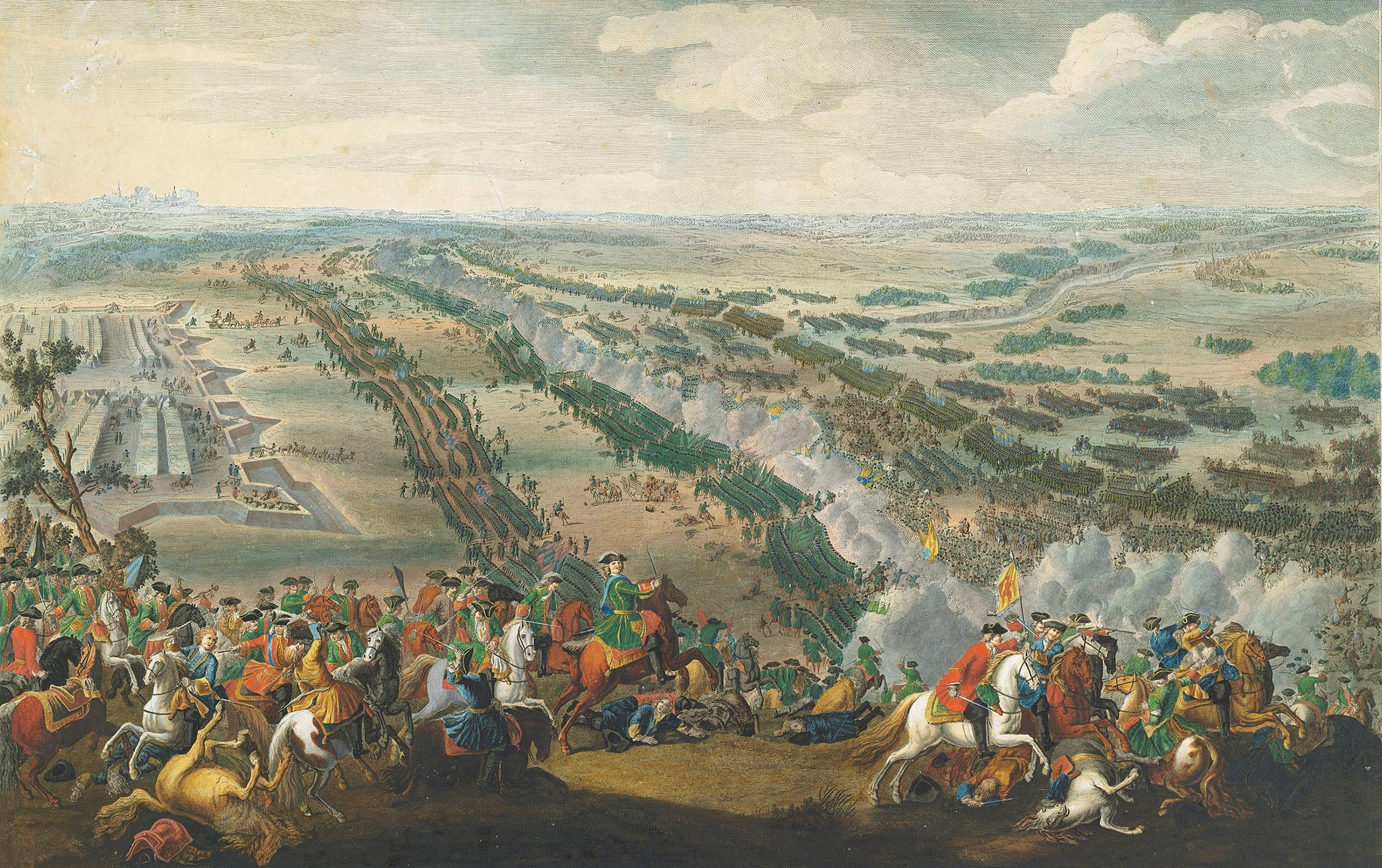
The Battle of Poltava between Russia and Sweden in 1709

Charles' subsequent invasion of Russia (1708-1709) met with initial success as victory followed victory, most notably at the Battle of Holowczyn in July 1708, when the Swedish army routed a Russian force twice its size. However, the campaign ended with disaster for Sweden when its army suffered heavy losses to a Russian force more than twice its size at Poltava in July [O.S. June] 1709 (Charles had been incapacitated by a wound prior to the battle, rendering him unable to take command). The defeat was followed by the Swedes' Surrender at Perevolochna three days later. Charles spent the following years in exile in the Ottoman Empire before returning to Swedish territory in 1714. He led an assault on Norway, trying to evict the Danish king from the war once more in order to aim all his forces at the Russians. Two campaigns met with frustration and ultimate failure, concluding with Charles' death at the Siege of Fredriksten in 1718.

By this time, most of the Swedish Empire was under foreign military occupation, though Sweden itself remained free. This territorial situation was later formalized, albeit moderated, in the 1721 Treaty of Nystad. The end of the war saw not only the end of the Swedish Empire but also of its powerful monarchy and war machine.

During the Great Northern War, Russian authorities sent Swedish prisoners of war in considerable numbers to Siberia, where came to number perhaps 25% of the population of Tobolsk (the capital of Siberia Governorate from 1708), and some settled permanently. Saint Petersburg, founded in 1703 on the same site as the originally Swedish town of Nyen in the province of Ingermanland, was built to a great extent by Swedish prisoners of war under Russian direction.

Estonia, under Swedish rule from 1558 to 1710, became a Russian territory in 1721. In 1780-1781 Empress Catherine II of Russia forced or encouraged 1,200 Estonian-Swedes from the island of Hiiumaa to move to New Russia (present day Ukraine), where they formed their very own village (Gammalsvenskby in the area of present-day Kherson Oblast).

==== Russo-Swedish War of 1788–1790 ====
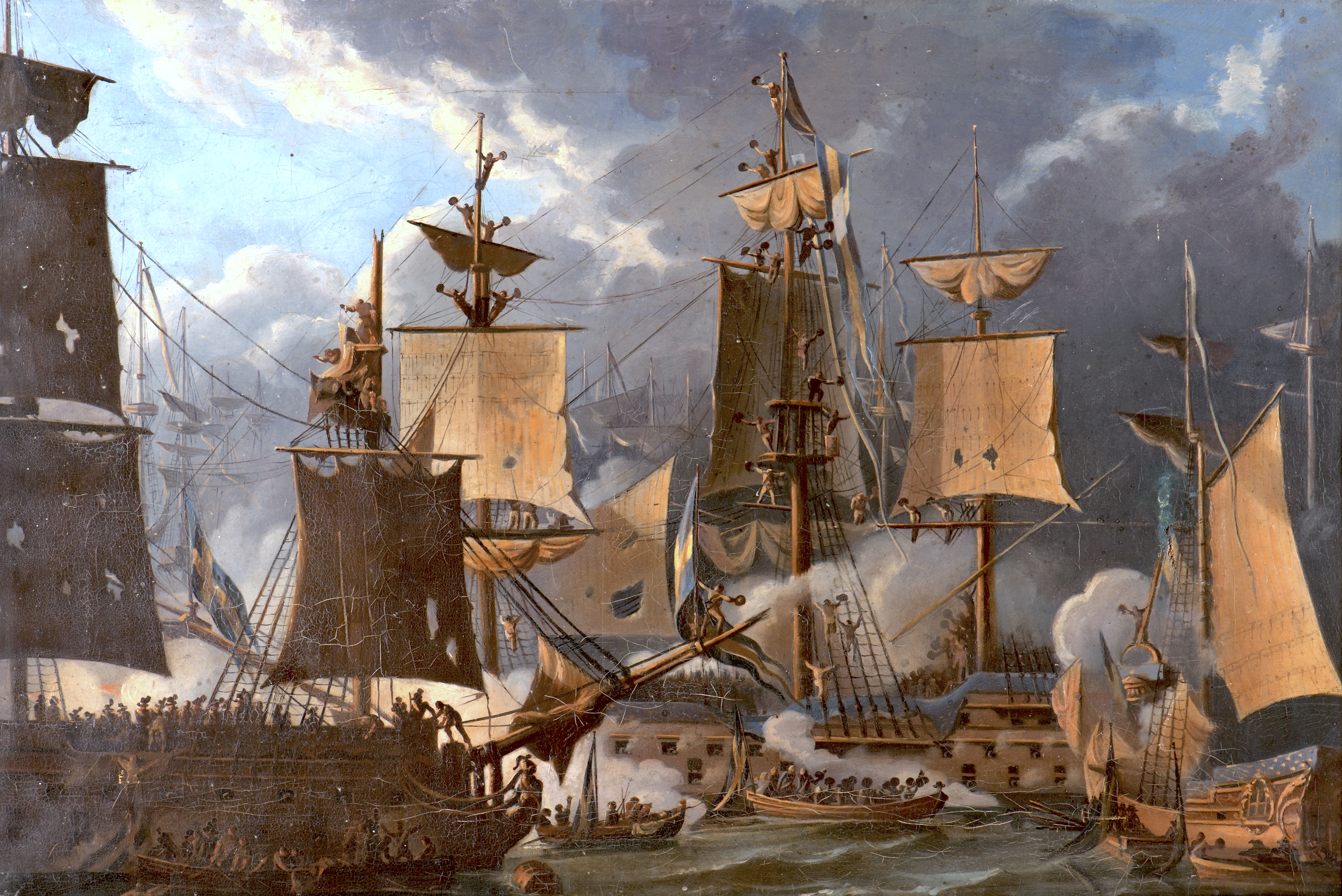
The Battle of Hogland in 1788

King Gustav III of Sweden initiated the Russo-Swedish War of 1788–1790 for domestic political reasons.

==== Napoleonic Wars ====
In the middle of the Napoleonic Wars, 1803–1815, Tsar Alexander I of Russia started a war against Sweden. The area included modern Sweden and Finland. Sweden relied on what it called 'The Gibraltar of the North'--the new fortifications at Sveaborg near modern-day Helsinki. It was prepared for heavy attacks and long sieges. Nevertheless, it surrendered to the Russians in a matter of weeks and 1808, due to the forceful demands of Russian General Jan Pieter van Suchtelen and the pusillanimous responses of Swedish Vice-Admiral Carl Olof Cronstedt. After the war ended in 1809, Finland was handed over to Russia. Napoleon's invasion of Swedish Pomerania in January 1812 led to a rapprochement between Sweden and Russia that included Russian recognition of Swedish rule over Norway. There never was another war between the two and Sweden lost its role as a major regional power.

== 20th century ==
The Swedish diplomat Raoul Wallenberg between July and December 1944 issued protective passports and housed Jews, saving tens of thousands of Jewish lives in Hungary. In 1944 he was arrested in Hungary and imprisoned in Moscow where he is supposed to have died. This occurred in the days of the Soviet Union, but the issue has later even been discussed between Russia and Sweden.

On 27 October 1981, the Soviet submarine S-363, of a design NATO designated Whiskey class, ran aground in Swedish territorial waters near Karlskrona. The stranded submarine was spotted in the early morning the following day by local fishermen, on the rocks in the Blekinge archipelago, resulting in an episode commonly labelled "Whiskey on the rocks". During the incident, Swedish naval forces took up positions on the edges of Swedish waters. It was later revealed that the Swedish Premier Torbjörn Fälldin had issued the Swedish navy orders to open fire, should approaching units of the Soviet Navy enter Swedish territorial waters. Swedish defence research also confirmed there could be nuclear weapons aboard the submarine. Over the years, there have been many submarine incidents where the Soviet Union has tried to collect military information from Sweden, including sightings of Soviet submarines along the Swedish coastline and espionage affairs.

== 21st century ==
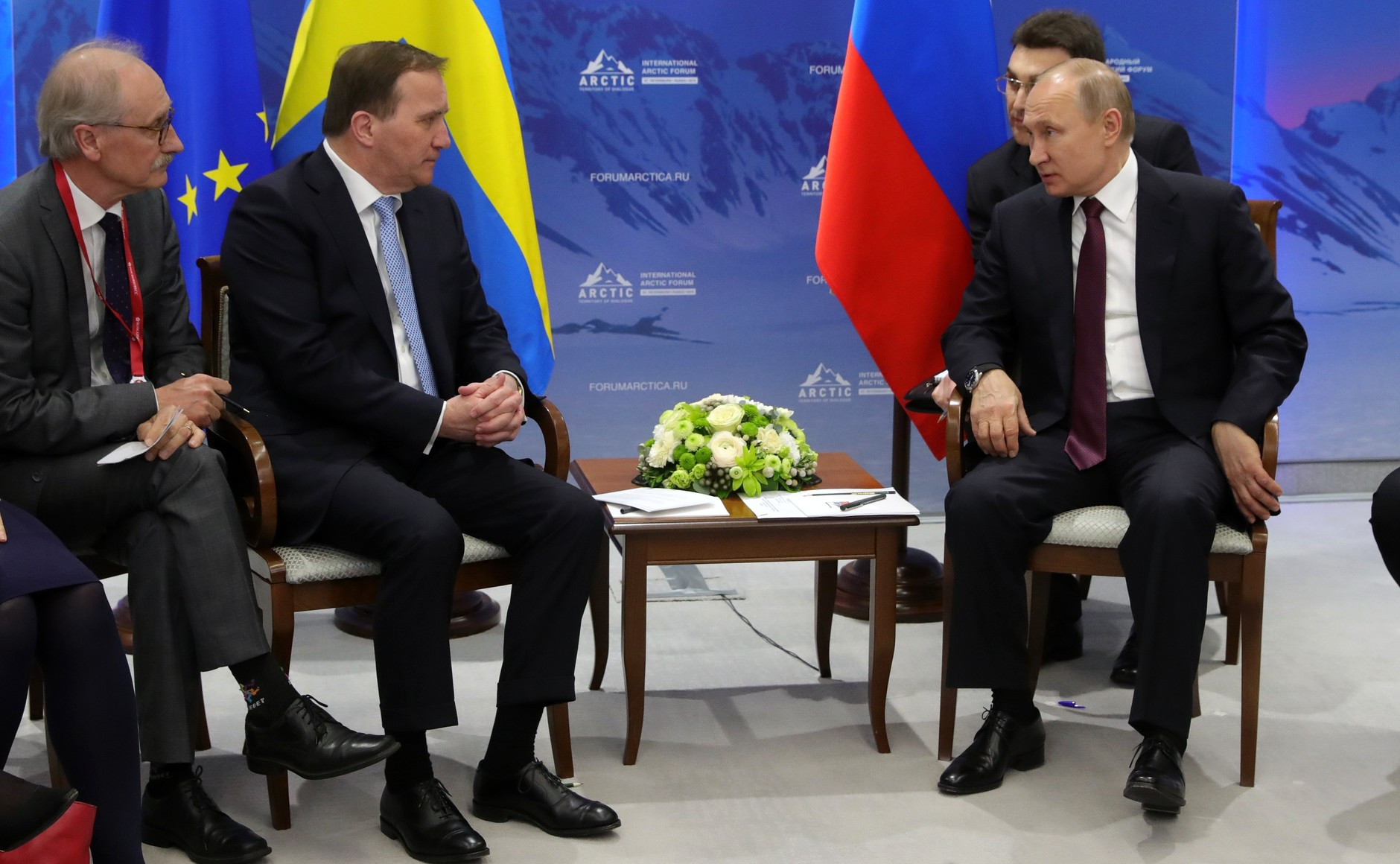
Swedish Prime Minister Stefan Löfven with Russian President Putin at the International Arctic Forum in Saint Petersburg, 9 April 2019

Relations between the two nations worsened after Moscow in 2009 rejected plans for a major EU-Russia summit in Stockholm. Then-Russian president Dmitry Medvedev believed that the summit should take place in Brussels because he believed it was a more neutral place for the summit. Another source of tension in the Russo-Swedish relations is Russia's recognition of the two breakaway regions, Abkhazia and South Ossetia, which broke away from Georgia after the Russo-Georgian War. Sweden's then-foreign minister Carl Bildt condemned Russia's actions, and compared it to that of Adolf Hitler's pre-Second World War aggression. Swedish politician Jan Björklund has also suggested that military units should be put on Gotland in case of a war between Russia and Sweden.

The Nord Stream 1 gas pipeline in the Baltic Sea from Russia to Germany was the topic of Swedish Defence Research Agency's Robert L. Larsson's 110-page study "Nord Stream, Sweden and Baltic Sea Security" (2007) that found a number of concerning aspects in the Nord Stream project. The Swedish Defence Commission, however, did not mention any military implications of the pipeline in its December 2007 report on security issues and instead called for strict environmental requirements and cooperation between Baltic Sea states on surveillance. The Swedish government gave its approval of the project in November 2009.

Russian bombers have operated close to Swedish airspace on a number of occasions after the start of the Russo-Ukrainian war and this has caused a discussion in Sweden to scale up its defences which also happened in 2015 with acquisitions of more Gripen aircraft, submarines, anti aircraft missiles and deployment of troops to Gotland in the Baltic Sea.

In March 2018, relations deteriorated further due to the poisoning of Sergei and Yulia Skripal in Salisbury, United Kingdom. Upon the United Kingdom stating that Russia produced the agent used, Russia claimed that several countries including Sweden were producing Novichok, the nerve agent used in the Salisbury attack. The Swedish Minister for Foreign Affairs, Margot Wallström, called the accusations 'unacceptable' on Twitter. In response to the attack, Sweden expelled a Russian diplomat from Stockholm. In response, Russia expelled a Swedish diplomat from Moscow.

Sweden is on Russia's "Unfriendly Countries List" (red). Countries and territories on the list have imposed or joined sanctions against Russia.

In May 2018 amid tensions with Russia, Sweden sent pamphlets to its households telling its citizens how to prepare in case of war, the first time Sweden had done so since the Cold War in the 1980s. In October 2020, Sweden declared that military spending would increase by 40 percent in 5 years citing Russian activity in the Baltic Sea.

In December 2021, Russia warned of "serious military and political consequences" in case of Sweden's NATO membership. In February 2022, after Russia invaded Ukraine, they made the same threats towards Sweden and Finland.

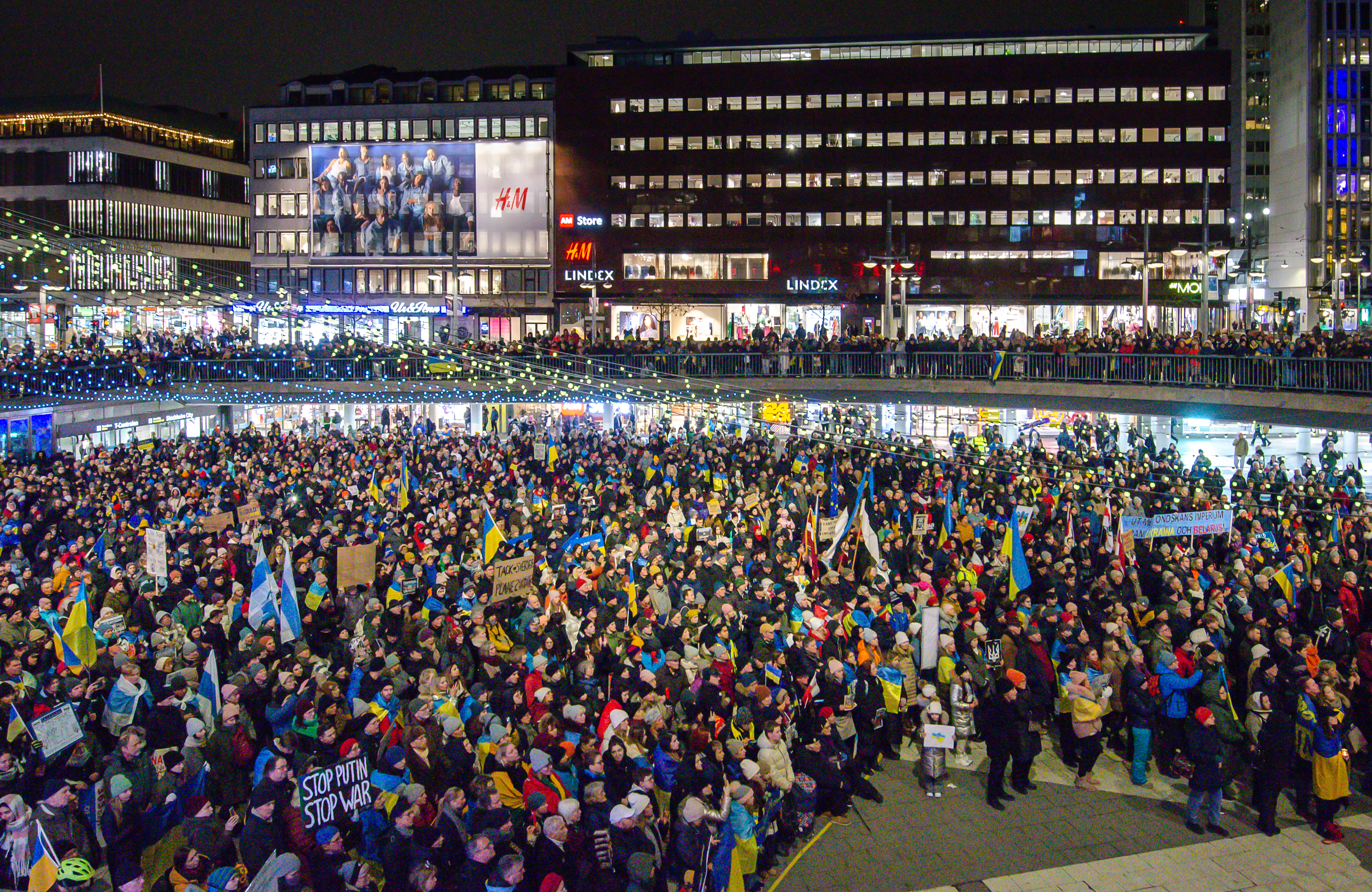
Demonstration on the anniversary of the Russian invasion of Ukraine in Stockholm, 24 February 2023

After the 2022 Russian invasion of Ukraine started, Sweden, as one of the EU countries, imposed sanctions on Russia, and Russia added all EU countries to the list of "unfriendly nations". Sweden joined other countries in spring 2022 in declaring a number of Russian diplomats persona non grata. In 2023, it summoned Russia's ambassador to complain about a statement on the embassy's web site according to which joining NATO made the Nordic countries "a legitimate target for Russian retaliatory measures, including those of a military nature". A YouGov poll showed that in February 2023, 63% of respondents in Sweden wanted to support Ukraine in a war with Russia until Russian troops leave all occupied territories. On 7 March 2024, Sweden officially joined NATO.

In May 2024, NATO stated that Sweden had been one of several members targeted by Russian hybrid operations. The Swedish Security Police started an investigation behind repeated railway derailments in northern Sweden, suspecting Russian sabotage. The Swedish Security Police also described Russia's increased aggression and risk taking in its activity relating to Sweden.

In March 2026, Sweden's Security Service (SAPO) identified Russia as one of the country's three main security threats alongside China and Iran.

== Trade ==
In 2021 Sweden exported goods to the value of $2.65 billion to Russia with broadcasting equipment being the top goods. Russia exported $1.53 billion to Sweden with coal tar oil as the top product. Between 1995 and 2021 Swedish goods rose by an average of 5.69% p.a. whilst Russian exports rose by 4.88% p.a. on average.

In August 2023 Sweden exports rose to over SEK 1 billion whilst imports fell to just SEK 24 million.

== Resident diplomatic missions ==
- Russia has an embassy in Stockholm.
- Sweden has an embassy in Moscow.
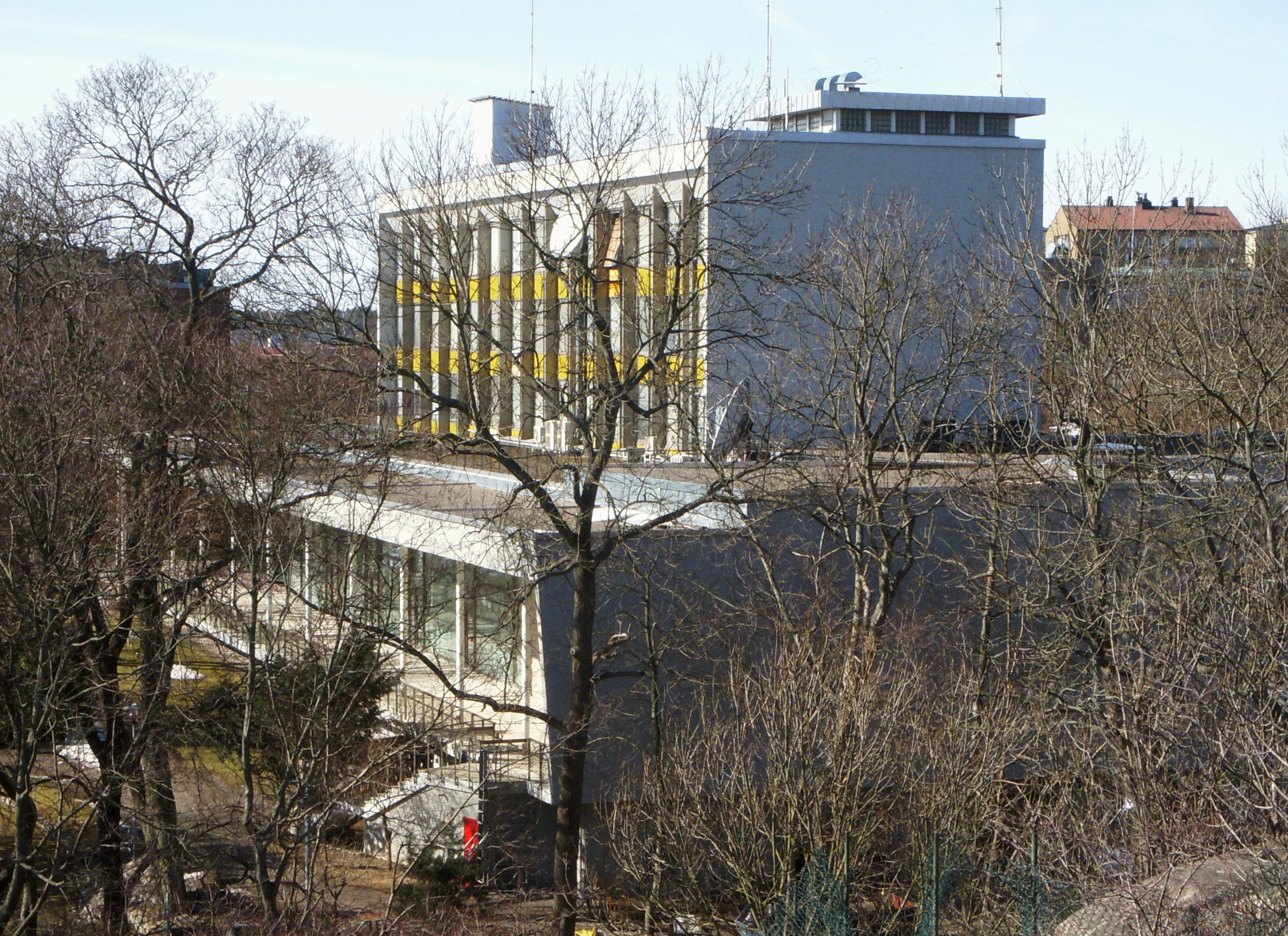
Embassy of Russia, Stockholm

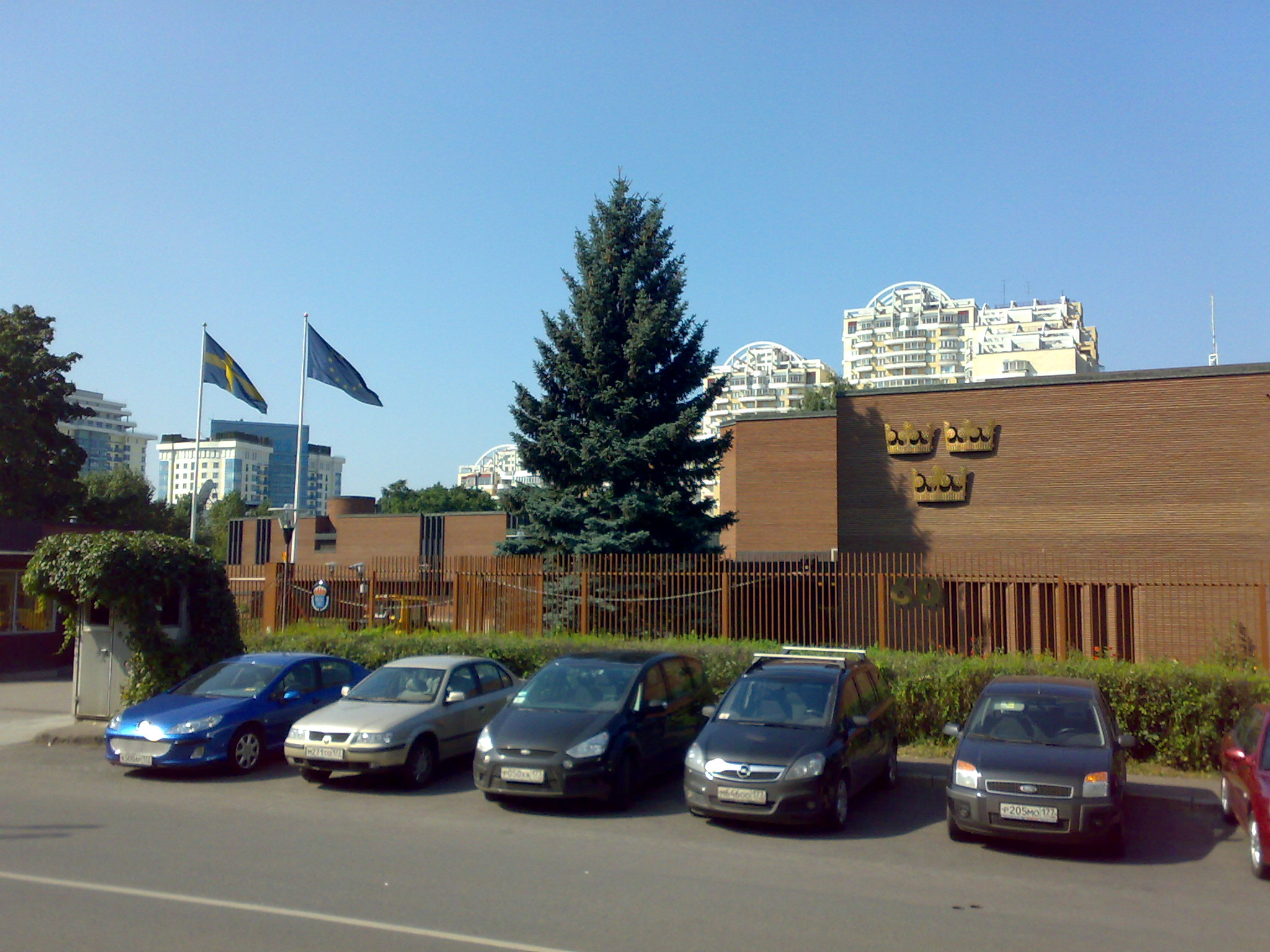
Embassy of Sweden, Moscow

== See also ==
- List of ambassadors of Russia to Sweden
- List of ambassadors of Sweden to Russia
- Russo-Swedish Wars
- Russians in Sweden
- Russian National Association
- Anti-Russian sentiment in Sweden
- Swedish School in Moscow
- Sweden–Ukraine relations
- Russia–NATO relations
