= Russian National Association =

The Russian National Association (Swedish: Ryska riksförbundet) is a Swedish association, which serves both as a friendship association between Russia and Sweden, and as a community organization for the Russians in Sweden. It was founded on 18 October 2003. In 2008 the National Association consisted of 20 local associations. The following year it joined SIOS, the Cooperation Group for Ethnic Associations in Sweden. Its Chairperson is Lioudmila Siegel, who during the Russian presidential election in 2012 identified herself as a supporter of President Vladimir Putin, and rejected accusations of election fraud.

According to its charter, the goals of the Russian National Association include to preserve the Russian language, popularize Russian culture in Sweden, tie closer bonds between Russia and Sweden, support the integration of Russians living in Sweden, oppose xenophobia, and "support the unification of Russian compatriots abroad". The association has close connections to the Russian embassy in Stockholm, and regularly arranges events together with it. Other activities include for example a moving exhibition about Russian women in Sweden called "The Russian Bride – An Ordinary Woman", challenging societal views on so-called mail-order brides, memorial activities in connection to a World War II-era camp that held Soviet military internees in Rönntorp, and a 2 November 2014 rally in memory of the 2 May 2014 Odessa clashes, which the association denounced as a massacre, also calling the 2014 Ukrainian revolution an illegal coup d'état.

In 2023, newspaper Dagens Nyheter published an article where they accused the Russian National Association for spreading Russian and Putinist propaganda internally while they receive Swedish public funds which are conditional on adhering to democratic values. Arbetarnas bildningsförbund (ABF, "Workers' Educational Association") immediately broke off their cooperation with the Russian National Association following the article.

== See also ==
- Russia–Sweden relations
- Russians in Sweden
