= Mediastan =

2013 film by Johannes Wahlström

- Directed by: Johannes Wahlström
- Produced by: Julian Assange; Rebecca O'Brien; Lauren Dark
- Cinematography: Fedor Lyass
- Music by: Anton Kolbe
- Release date: 13 February 2013
- Country: Sweden

Mediastan - A WikiLeaks Road Movie is a 2013 documentary film about a group of WikiLeaks staff travelling through Central Asia finding local partners to publish sensitive material about the local area from the 2010 United States diplomatic cables leak. It was directed by Johannes Wahlström and produced by Julian Assange, Rebecca O'Brien, Lauren Dark and Ken Loach's company Sixteen Films. Its release was timed to challenge that of The Fifth Estate, a film dramatisation about WikiLeaks which Assange has described as a "propaganda attack" against the organisation. The film debuted at the Raindance Film Festival.

== See also ==
- Underground: The Julian Assange Story – an Australian television film
