= Israel Shamir =

Holocaust denier

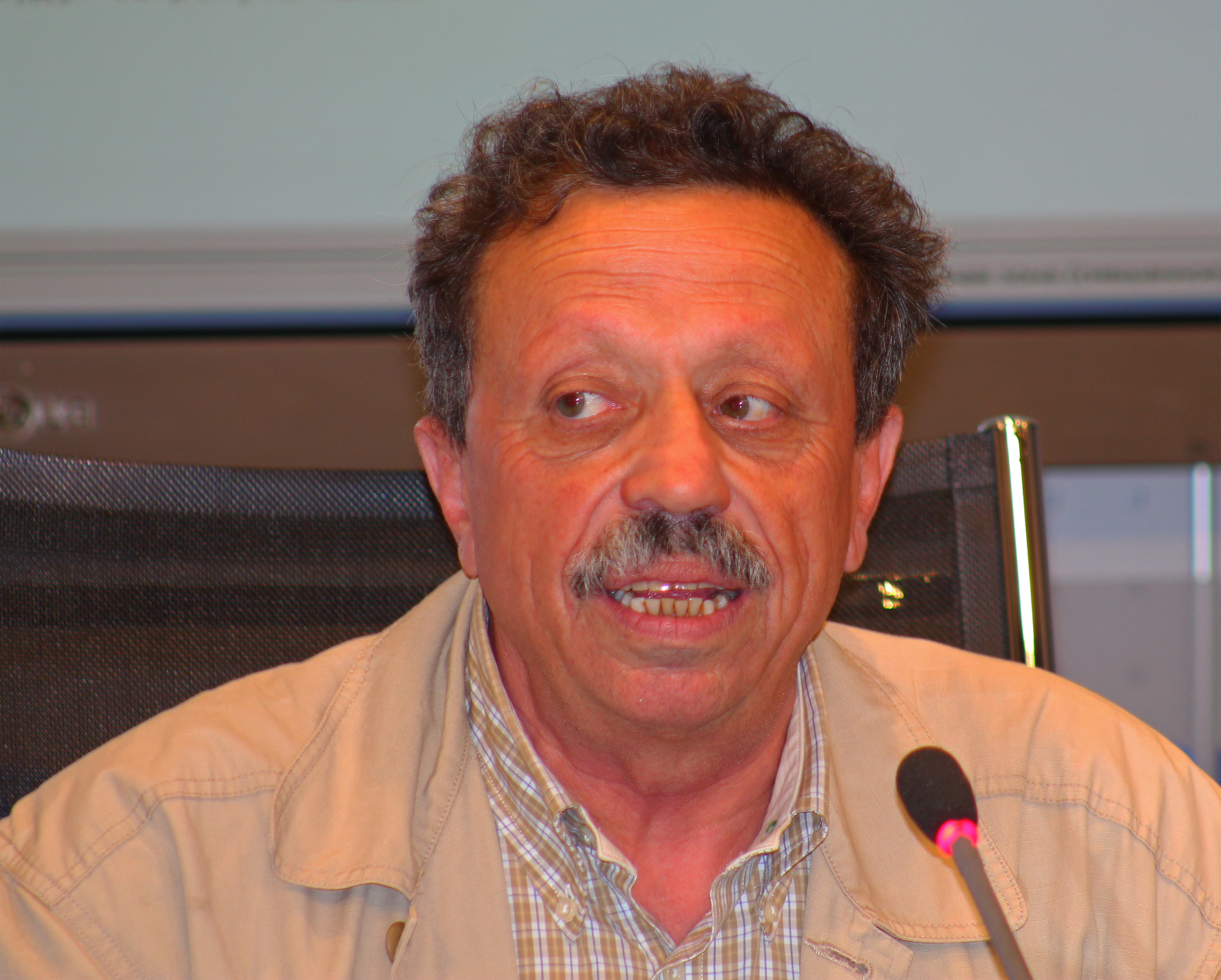
- Born: Izrail Schmerler; 1947 or 1948; Novosibirsk, Siberia, Russia
- Other names: Robert David, Vassili Krasevsky, Jöran Jermas, Adam Ermash
- Occupations: Journalist, Writer
- Known for: Wikileaks, antisemitism, Holocaust denial

Israel Shamir (Russian: Исраэль Шамир, [jɪsrɐˈɛlʲ ʂɐˈmʲir]; born 1947 or 1948), also known by the names Robert David, Vassili Krasevsky, Jöran Jermas and Adam Ermash, is a Swedish writer and journalist, known for his ties to WikiLeaks. His son Johannes Wahlström is a spokesperson for WikiLeaks in Sweden.

Critics have accused him of promoting antisemitism and Holocaust denial. Shamir has published or self-published a number of his books; his book Flowers of Galilee (2004) was banned for a time in France over allegations it was inciting racial hatred and antisemitism.

== Background and personal life ==
Shamir says that he was born in a Jewish family in Russia, and converted to Orthodox Christianity. By his own account, his birth name was Izrail Schmerler. Shamir says that he was born in Novosibirsk, Siberia, in 1947, although the Shorter Jewish Encyclopedia says that a man called Schmerler was born in 1948. Shamir says that he "studied mathematics and law at Novosibirsk University". He also says he moved to Israel in 1969. He claimed to have served in the Israeli Paratroopers Brigade and fought in the Yom Kippur War. He also claimed to have worked for the BBC and to have translated the works of Shai Agnon from Hebrew into Russian. Norman Finkelstein told Tablet that Shamir is a "maniac" who "has invented his entire personal history. Nothing he says about himself is true".

Searchlight describes him as a "Swedish anti-semite", and says that he was registered in Sweden in 1984 and gained Swedish citizenship in 1992. Shamir says he left Sweden for Russia and then Israel in 1993, before returning in 1998, saying that he had remarried in Israel in July 1994. However, others argue that Swedish files show that he was married in Sweden. He was known as Jöran Jermas from 2001 to 2005, before changing his name to Adam Ermash, although continuing to use Israel Shamir as a pen name.

== Career ==
Shamir says that he went to Russia and wrote about the political changes in the country until 1993, for newspapers including Pravda and the extreme nationalist Zavtra.

The French edition of Shamir's Flowers of Galilee was originally co-published in October 2003 by Éditions Blanche and Éditions Balland. It was withdrawn from sale at the end of October after Balland's director had his attention drawn to the content of the book, which he considered antisemitic. The book was republished in 2004 by the French Islamist Éditions Al-Qalam company, which led to a civil case brought by the Ligue internationale contre le racisme et l'antisémitisme (LICRA), with the publisher sentenced to three months in prison (suspended) and a 10,000-euro fine, and the banning of the book. The ban was overturned on appeal, and the fine reduced.

In 2005, Shamir was featured as a speaker in the "Zionism As the Biggest Threat to Modern Civilization" conference co-chaired by David Duke in Ukraine, and sponsored by the Interregional Academy of Personnel Management which has been associated with antisemitic discourse in Eastern Europe.

== Allegations of antisemitism and Holocaust denial ==
According to the scholar of antisemitism Henrik Bachner, Shamir borrows from neo-Nazi terminology when describing an alleged "Zionist" conspiracy to bring about the Iraq War. Bachner has said that Shamir's writing would have been of little interest had they been published only on his website, however, Flowers of Galilee was issued by a respected publisher and promoted by parts of the left in Sweden. The book was recommended by former Swedish MP Evert Svensson and promoted by The Palestine Solidarity Association in Sweden which also engaged Shamir as speaker. In Cabbala of Power, Shamir writes: "The Jewish 'plan' is no secret; there is no need to re-read The Protocols or to ask Jews what they want."

Henrik Bachner, described Shamir's online outlet as "a multilingual website in which Jewish conspiracies are brought forward as an explanation for both historical and contemporary world events". Stephen Pollard reported in The Times in 2005 that it included such statements as "Jews asked God to kill, destroy, humiliate, exterminate, defame, starve, impale Christians, to usher in Divine Vengeance and to cover God’s mantle with blood of goyim." The Anti-Defamation League reported in 2006 that Shamir had written on his website of "accumulating evidence of Israeli Connection" for 9/11 and wrote of the United States and Israel creating the attacks to carry out anti-Muslim policies. He had expressed his belief in the "blood libel" on his website.

In 2004, Searchlight wrote about his connections to antisemitic publications and groups, and the campaign Hope not Hate has listed Shamir as a "notable Holocaust denier," citing the "rabid Holocaust denial material" on his website. At an event at the British Houses of Parliament in 2005, Shamir claimed "Jews indeed own, control and edit a big share of mass media" and said US foreign policy in the Middle East was a "fight for ensuring Jewish supremacy".

In 2006, discussing the upcoming Iranian International Conference to Review the Global Vision of the Holocaust, Deutsche Welle wrote that the Iranian government "said it intended to invite academics such as German neo-Nazi [lawyer] Horst Mahler and the Israeli journalist and Christian convert Israel Shamir, both of whom are Holocaust deniers."

In December 2010, Shamir's connection with WikiLeaks brought him more public attention. Katha Pollitt, writing in The Nation in December 2010, described Shamir's web site: "I spent a few hours on www.israelshamir.net and learned that: 'the Jews' foisted capitalism, advertising and consumerism on harmonious and modest Christian Europe; were behind Stalin's famine in Ukraine; control the banks, the media and many governments; and that 'Palestine is not the ultimate goal of the Jews; the world is'. There are numerous guest articles by Holocaust deniers, aka 'historical revisionists.'"

In early 2011, David Leigh and Luke Harding, writing in The Guardian, described Shamir as being "notorious for Holocaust denial and publishing a string of antisemitic articles." The Jerusalem Post called him "an avowed Holocaust-denier" who said of the International Conference to Review the Global Vision of the Holocaust that it "proved that the Holocaust dogma is a basic tenet in the great world-embracing brainwashing machine of mass media". Shamir denied the accusation of Holocaust denial in an article for CounterPunch, writing that his family "lost too many of its sons and daughters for me to deny the facts of Jewish tragedy" but that he denies "the morbid cult of Holocaust". In his 2011 Tablet interview, Shamir referred to "perceptions during the war" of Auschwitz as a "quite awful deportation camp" whereas "after the war, different perception came. And that was a perception of mass annihilation, and mass murder, and all that." Asked which "perception" was true, Shamir said he had no interest in the subject. When asked if the concentration camps were used for mass murder, he responded by saying he had "no knowledge about it at all" and rejected "the idea that it is important."

== Association with WikiLeaks ==
Shamir is a vocal backer of the WikiLeaks organization and has described his relation with WikiLeaks as being "a freelancer who was 'accredited' to WikiLeaks". According to The Guardian, he invoiced WikiLeaks for €2,000 for "journalism". Shamir's son Johannes Wahlström is a spokesperson for WikiLeaks in Sweden.

In a 2010 Sveriges Radio interview with WikiLeaks spokesman Kristinn Hrafnsson, Hrafnsson stated that Israel Shamir "is associated with" WikiLeaks, as are "a lot of journalists that are working with us all around the world" who "have different roles in working on [the] project". In an article by Andrew Brown published in The Guardian during December 2010 Hrafnsson was quoted as saying Shamir was WikiLeaks representative in Russia. By February 2011, former WikiLeaks spokesman Daniel Domscheit-Berg said WikiLeaks' ties to Shamir were among the reasons he quit the organization. He described Shamir as a "famous Holocaust denier and anti-Semite." By May 2011, a statement had appeared on the WikiLeaks website that Shamir had "never worked or volunteered for WikiLeaks, in any manner, whatsoever. He has never written for WikiLeaks or any associated organization, under any name and we have no plan that he do so." James Ball wrote in 2013 he was aware the organization's later denial of its connections to Shamir were untrue because Julian Assange had instructed him to give Shamir 90,000 US cables.

According to the Associated Press, leaked documents from WikiLeaks include an unsigned letter from Julian Assange authorising Israel Shamir to seek a Russian visa on his behalf in 2010. WikiLeaks said Assange never applied for the visa or wrote the letter. According to the New York Times, Russia issued Assange the visa in January 2011. Israel Shamir was the original source for some conspiracy theories about Swedish allegations against Assange.

=== Diplomatic cables ===
In an article published by the CounterPunch website in December 2010, Shamir praised the Belarus president, Alexander Lukashenko and said WikiLeaks had exposed America's "agents" in the country. Shamir has been reported to have passed "sensitive cables" to the Lukashenko government. He is believed to have visited Belarus in December 2010 and to have given Vladimir Makei, then Lukashenko's chief of staff, unpublished and unredacted US diplomatic cables.

Former WikiLeaks staff member James Ball wrote in The Sunday Times that Index on Censorship contacted him less than a fortnight after Shamir left WikiLeaks headquarters (then in Norfolk) with a photograph of Shamir leaving the Belarus interior ministry. According to Ball, soon afterwards Lukashenko announced a Belarusian WikiLeaks would be released to show opposition leaders in the country were on the American payroll and thus effectively grounds for their arrest. Index on Censorship later expressed concern that such a development could physically endanger Lukashenko's political opponents. WikiLeaks responded that "We have no further reports on this 'rumour/issue'", although another WikiLeaks representative called Shamir's alleged leaks "obviously unapproved."

Russian Reporter claimed it had "privileged access" to the 2010 United States diplomatic cables leak via Shamir. Soviet Belarus, a state-run newspaper began publishing what it claimed were WikiLeaks cables given to Lukashenko by Shamir in January 2011. A request from Shamir, according to Ball, was for all cables relating to "the Jews"; it was refused. Elsewhere, Shamir claimed to have received "thousands of cables about the Jews." Ball said that a Russian reporter wrote WikiLeaks saying that Shamir was answering requests for access to cables about Russia with requests for money, saying they couldn't look through the cables themselves.

Yulia Latynina, writing in The Moscow Times, alleged that Shamir concocted a cable which allegedly quoted European Union diplomats' plans to walk out of the Durban II speech by Iranian president Mahmoud Ahmadinejad, for publication in the pro-Putin Russian Reporter in December 2010. Shamir has denied this accusation, though he has described Ahmadinejad as being a "brave and charismatic leader" on his website.

In 2011, Shamir posted unredacted copies of diplomatic cables dealing with former Soviet states that hinted at the names of State Department sources that The Guardian and WikiLeaks had redacted. When asked why he published the unredacted cables, possibly putting the sources at risk, Shamir said "Handing confidential and secret information to everybody is the thing of Wikileaks. That’s what it is about. Your question is like asking police why they catch thieves. That is what they are for."
