= Constitution of Pylyp Orlyk =

1710 constitutional document

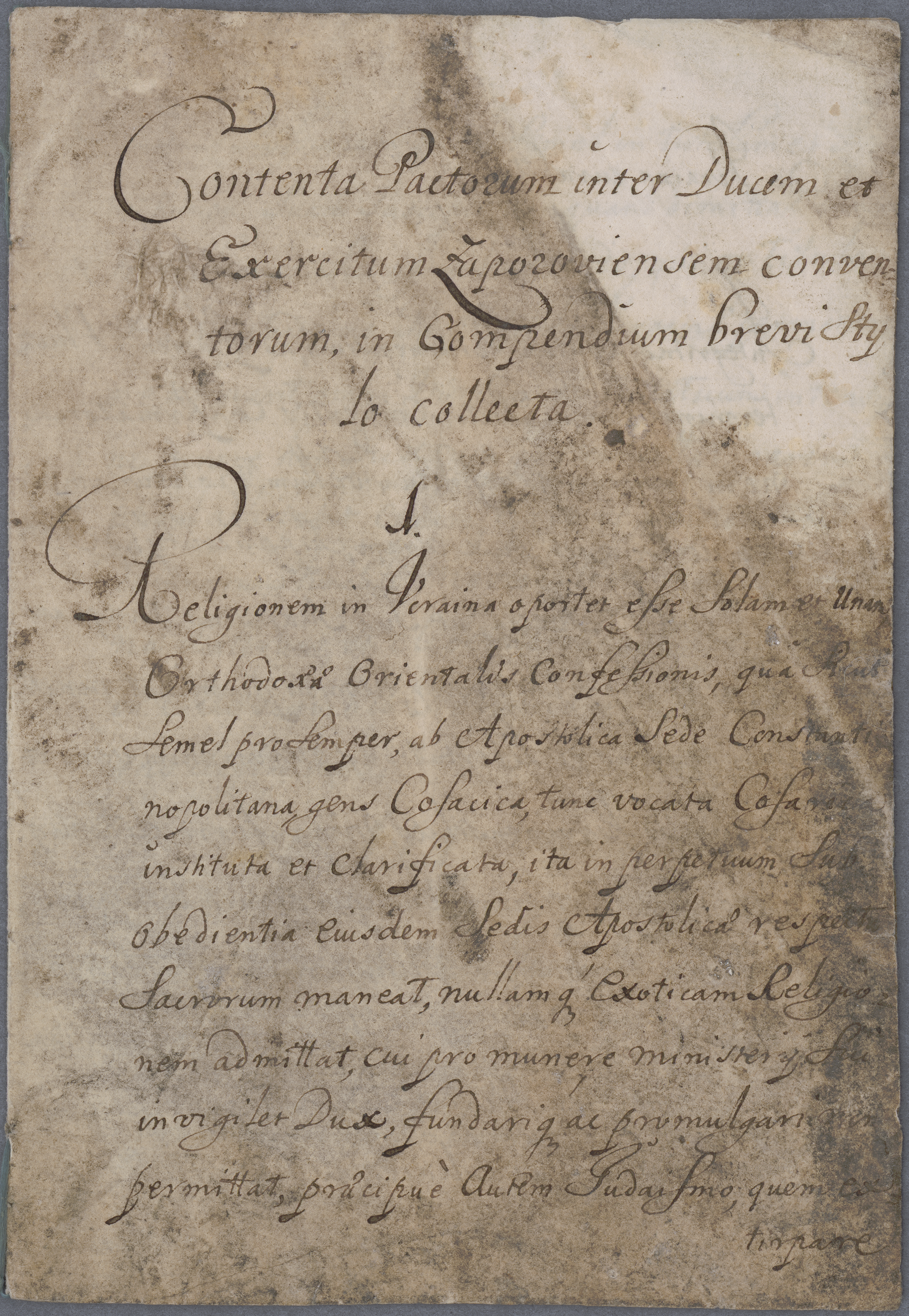
The first page of the Bender Constitution (Latin-language version, National Archives of Sweden). The tile reads: Latin: Contenta Pactorum inter Ducem et Exercitum Zaporoviensem conventorum, in Compendium brevi Stylo collecta

The Constitution of Pylyp Orlyk (Ukrainian: Конституція Пилипа Орлика, romanized: Konstytutsiia Pylypa Orlyka) or the Bender Constitution, (Note: In the historiography it was variously called as "Договір", "Хартія", "Угода", "Акт", "Конституція", "Державна конституція", "Конституція Пилипа Орлика", "Бендерська конституція", "Козацька конституція", "Конституція Української гетьманської держави", "Перша конституція України", "Конституція Війська Запорозького", "Українська конституція", etc.) formally titled as The Treaties and Resolutions of the Rights and Freedoms of the Zaporozhian Host (Latin: Pacta et Constitutiones legum libertatumque Exercitus Zaporoviensis, Ukrainian: Договори і Постановлення Прав і вольностей Війська Запорозького, romanized: Dohovory i Postanovlennia Prav i volʹnostei Viisʹka Zaporozʹkoho), is a constitutional document written by the Hetman of the Zaporizhian Host, Pylyp Orlyk, the Cossack elders and the Cossacks of the Zaporozhian Host on the 5 April 1710 in the city of Bender (Tighina) in the Principality of Moldavia. It is sometimes called the first constitution of Ukraine.

It established the principle of the separation of powers in government between the legislative, executive, and judiciary branches. The document limited the executive authority of the hetman, and established a Cossack parliament called the General Council (General Rada).

The Old Ukrainian-language original, signed by Orlyk, accompanied by a diploma signed by King Charles XII of Sweden, was found in 2008 by Ukrainian researchers in the Russian State Archive of Ancient Acts, Moscow. The Latin-language original is kept in the National Archives of Sweden.

== History ==
Full text in Old Ukrainian (pdf)

After the Battle of Poltava, when Charles XII of Sweden's and Hetman Ivan Mazepa's armies were defeated by Peter I of Russia, Pylyp Orlyk remained with Mazepa. Together, Orlyk, Mazepa, and their Cossack forces retreated to the city of Bender (Tighina) in Bessarabia (now the city is in Moldova, then in the Ottoman Empire). The Zaporizhian Cossack Army also settled in this area.

After Mazepa died, on 5 April 1710 Pylyp Orlyk was elected as the Hetman of the Zaporizhian Host. On the same day, he issued the Pacts and Constitutions of Rights and Freedoms of the Zaporizhian Host. Orlyk's Constitution is sometimes referred to by the city of its proclamation, the Bender Constitution.

== Articles ==
The Ukrainian-language title reads: "Договори і постанови прав і свобод військових між Ясновельможним Його Милості паном Пилипом Орликом, новообраним гетьманом Війська Запорізького, і між генеральними особами, полковниками і тим же Військом Запорізьким з повною згодою з обох сторін" The document is made up of a preamble and 16 articles.

=== Preamble ===
The preamble briefly discusses Cossack history, their Khazar and Roxolani origin mythos, the rise of the Zaporizhian Sich and its downfall when after under Bohdan Khmelnytsky it rebelled against the Polish-Lithuanian Commonwealth and ended up serving Imperial Russia. According to the introduction, using all available means, Moscow limited and nullified rights and freedoms of the Zaporizhian Host and eventually subjugated the free Cossack nation. Ivan Mazepa's politics and alliance with Charles XII of Sweden are explained as logical and inevitable, mandated by the need to free the homeland. The independence of the new state from Russia is given as the primary goal of the Bender Constitution.

A conservator at the National Archives of Sweden pages through one of the two remaining copies of the constitution.

=== Articles 1–5 ===
Articles 1–3 dealt with general Ukrainian affairs. They proclaimed the Eastern Orthodox faith to be the faith of Ukraine, and to further the independence from Moscow, the Kyiv Patriarchate must acquire the direct subordination to the Apostolic Capital of Constantinople. The residence of people proselytizing other faiths, such as Catholicism, Islam and Judaism, must be forbidden. The Sluch River was designated as the boundary between Ukraine and Poland. The articles also recognized the need for an anti-Russian alliance between Ukraine and the Crimean Khanate.

Articles 4–5 reflected the interests of the Zaporozhian Cossacks, who constituted the overwhelming majority of the Bender emigration. The Hetman was obligated:

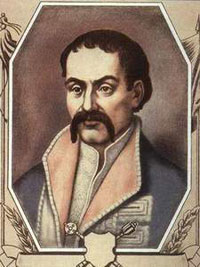
Hetman Pylyp Orlyk

1. to expel, with the help of Charles XII, the Russians from Zaporozhian territories
2. to grant the town of Trakhtemyriv to the Zaporozhians to serve as a hospital, and
3. to disallow non-Zaporozhians to own anything in Zaporozhian territories

=== Articles 6–16 ===
Articles 6–10 limited the powers of the hetman and established a Cossack parliament, similar to an extended council of officers, which was to meet three times a year. The General Council was to consist not only of the general staff and the regimental colonels, but also of "an outstanding and worthy individual from each regiment."

Articles 11–16 protected the rights of towns, limited the taxation of peasants and poor Cossacks, and restricted the innkeepers. Charles XII, king of Sweden and "the protector of Ukraine," happened to be in Bender at the time, and confirmed these articles.

== Commemoration ==
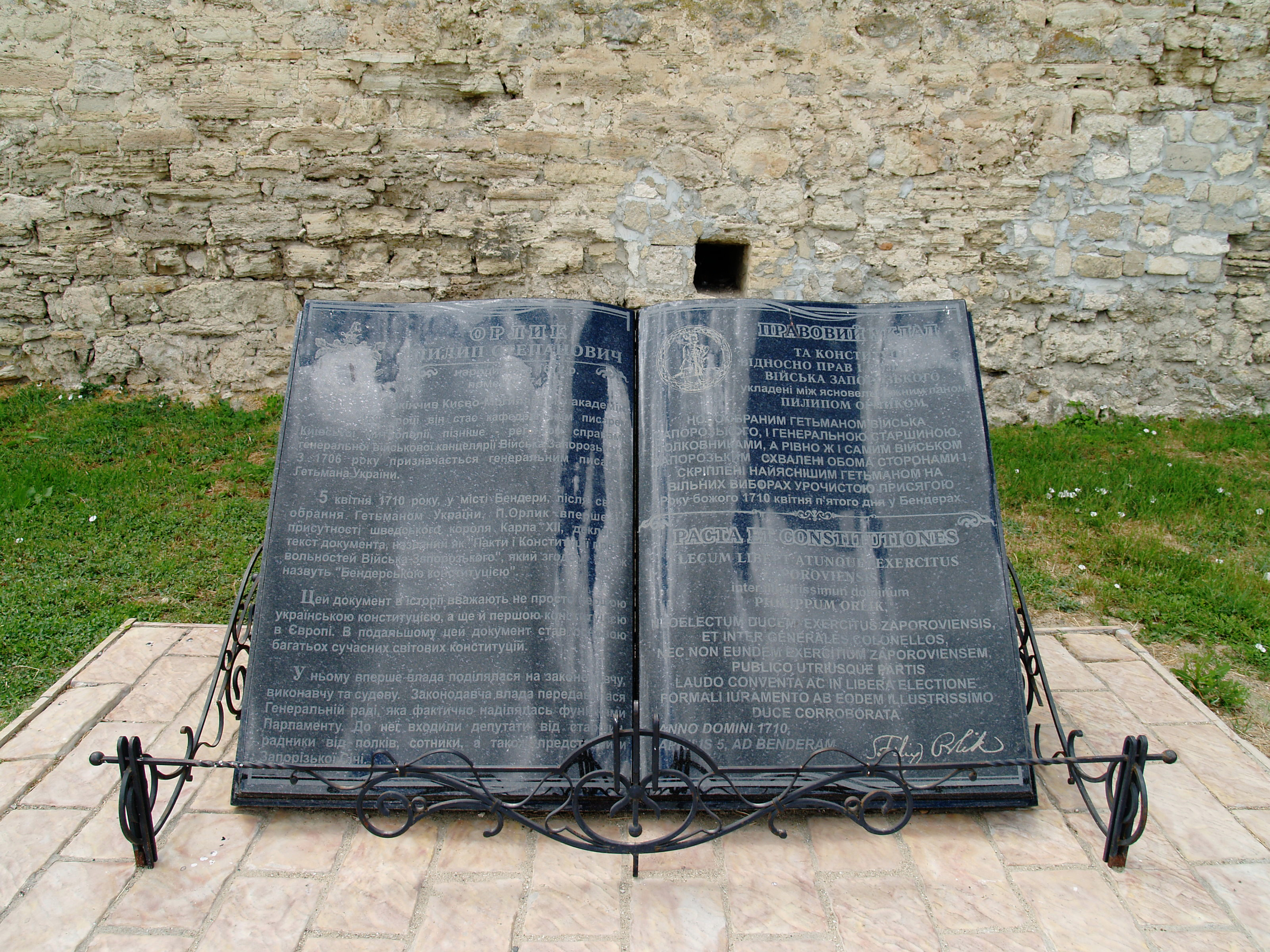
The monument in the Tighina (Bender) Fortress

On 9 April 2010, the 300th anniversary of the creation of the Constitution, a monument was dedicated in Bender. The monument is in the form of a book with engraved information about the history of the writing of the Constitution and its full name in Ukrainian and Latin.
