= Pavlo Hertsyk =

Ukrainian Cossack officer (death c. 1700)

Pavlo Semenovych Hertsyk (Ukrainian: Павло Семенович Герцик; ? – ca. 1700) was a Ukrainian Cossack officer, the colonel of the Poltava Regiment (1675-1677, 1683–1687, 1691–1695) of the Cossack Hetmanate. The Hertsyk family were Ukrainian Cossacks of Christianized Ashkenazi Jewish origin.

Pavlo's father was a Jewish merchant from Uman who had moved to Poltava where he later became a colonel of the Poltava regiment. His father converted to Orthodox faith. Pavlo sponsored the construction of the Church of the Elevation (Воздвиженськa церквa) at the Kiev-Pechersk Lavra, where he was subsequently buried.

His three sons, Hryhory, Ivan and Opanas went into exile with Mazepa. His daughter Hanna Hertsyk was the wife of Hetman Pylyp Orlyk, Maria was the wife of the Host secretary Volodymyr Maksymovych, and Chrystyna was the wife of the colonel Hryhory Novytsky, who was eventually exiled to Siberia.

Hryhory Hertsyk was responsible for moving Ivan Mazepa's body from Bender to Galatz. He and his brothers followed Hetman Pylyp Orlyk to Sweden in 1716, where they stayed until 1720. Hryhory was appointed General Osaul by Hetman Pylyp Orlyk and as such sent from Stockholm to Poland in 1720, although in Warsaw he was arrested then handed over to the Russians. He was then imprisoned in Saint Petersburg until 1728, when he was allowed to move to Moscow where his wife and children lived.

== See also ==
- History of the Jews in Ukraine
