= Susan Tendler =

Conservative female rabbi

Susan Tendler is the first female rabbi in Chattanooga. She began that job at the B'nai Zion Congregation in 2013. Previously she had been assistant rabbi for Congregation Beth El in Norfolk, Virginia. She is a Conservative rabbi.
