= Fidobank =

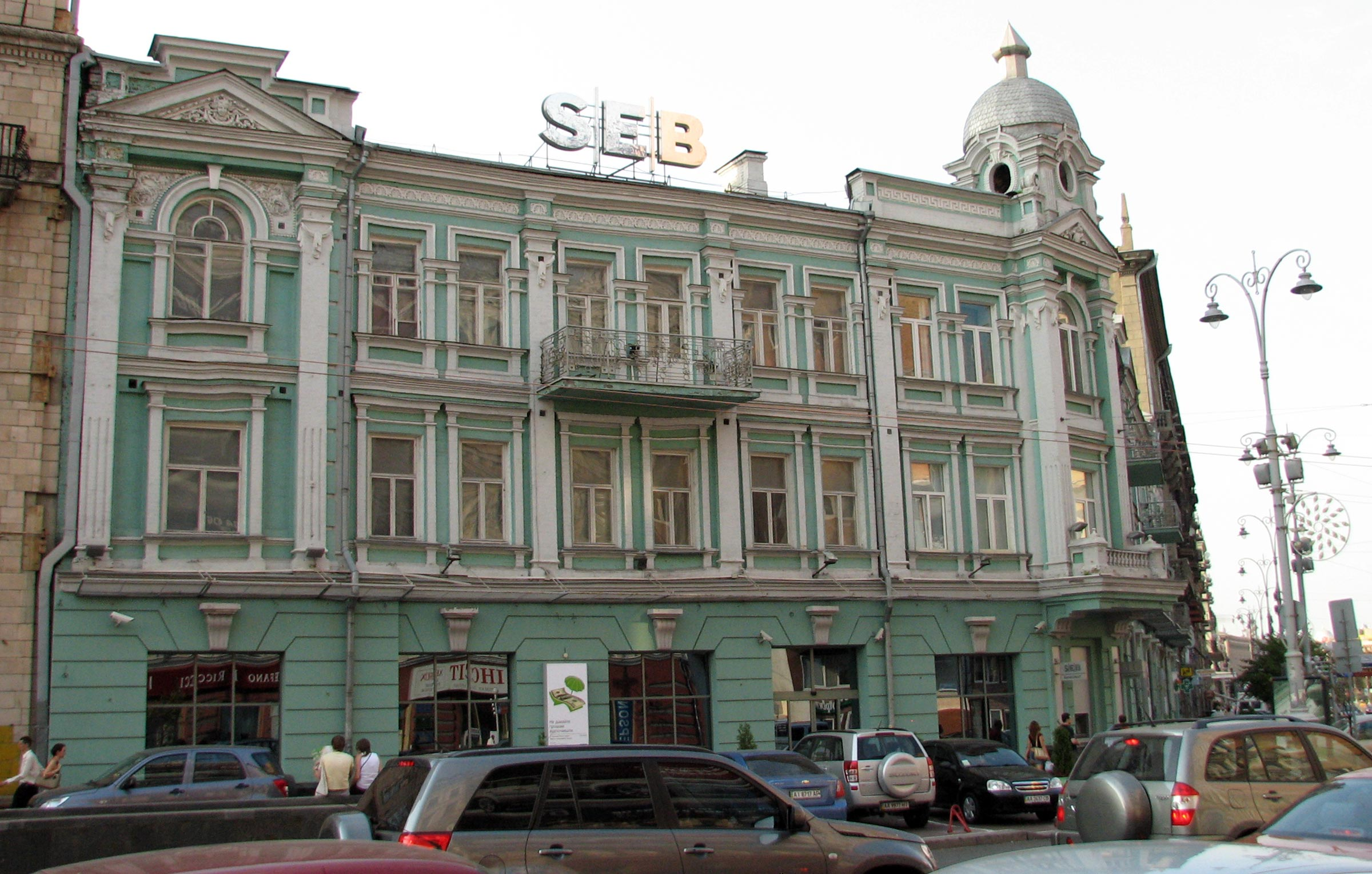
SEB Bank's head office was located on 10 Chervonoarmiyska street in Kyiv (2008).

Fidobank (formerly SEB Bank) was a bank in Ukraine that until 2012 belonged to the Swedish SEB Group.

It was registered at the National Bank of Ukraine on October 2, 1991, under the name Agio Bank (Ukrainian: Ажіо Банк). It used to be known as Ukrpostachbank (Ukrainian SSR). This bank was acquired by SEB Vilniaus bankas in January 2005 and later renamed SEB Bank. In late 2007 SEB acquired Factorial Bank (Ukrainian: Факторіал-Банк) with offices in Kharkiv and the East Ukraine. Factorial bank was incorporated as a department of SEB Bank during 2008–2009.

Today the SEB Group owns only a life insurance company in Ukraine.

In 2012 SEB Group sold its banking business in Ukraine to a Cyprus offshore company "Ignace Marketing Limited" (20%) and a consulting company "Finance Analit Service" (80%) (belongs to "Ignace Marketing Limited" through "Deviza"). Ignace Marketing Limited through a number of other offshore companies belong to Oleksandr Adarich.

In 2015, Fidobank acquired MoneXy, the first Ukrainian electronic payment system, founded by Pavlo Tanasyuk and Yuriy Chaika in 2009.

Fidobank also acquired Erste Bank Ukraine AT (formerly Bank Prestige) from the Austria based Erste Group.

Bank Prestige was founded by former owner of Bank Aval after the sale of last to the Raiffeisen International.

== See also ==
- List of banks in Ukraine
