= Grégoire Orlyk =

French military commander

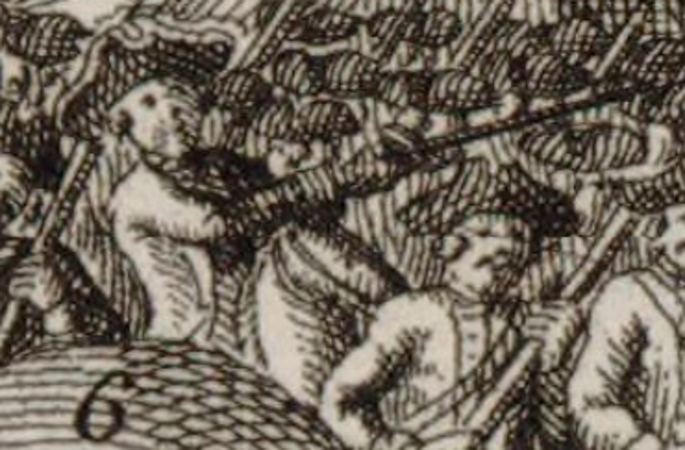
Depiction of Hryhor Orlyk (marked with number 6) on a contemporary illustration of the Battle of Bergen in 1759

Grégoire Orlyk, also Hryhor Orlyk (Ukrainian: Григор Пилипович Орлик; November 5, 1702, Baturyn – November 14, 1759, Minden), was a French military commander, special envoy and member of Louis XV's secret intelligence service. Grégoire Orlyk was born in Ukraine, the son of Ukrainian hetman in exile Pylyp Orlyk and Hanna Hertsyk. He received a good education in Sweden, served in Poland and Saxony, and participated in the secret efforts of France to restore Stanisław Leszczyński to the Polish throne. He later commanded the king's regiment of Royal suédois. For his intelligence work and military exploits he was given the title of comte and promoted to the general's rank of Maréchal de camp. Grégoire Orlyk was an acquaintance of the French philosopher Voltaire, and championed the Ukrainian cause in France and other countries.

== Background ==
Hryhor Orlyk was born on November 5, 1702, in Baturyn, the capital of Cossack Hetmanate in the family of Cossacks' General scribe Pylyp Orlyk. The family was very well connected with the then hetman Ivan Mazepa, who became Hryhor's godfather. After Mazepa's defeat at Poltava in 1709, he and his allies, including the family of Pylyp Orlyk, fled Ukraine for Ottoman territory: Bendery (present-day Moldova), where Orlyk and his family lived for five years, together with other Ukrainian émigrés and the defeated Swedish king Charles XII. Upon Mazepa's death, Pylyp Orlyk was proclaimed the hetman of Ukraine in exile and by agreement between Tsardom of Russia and the Ottoman Empire in 1714, Charles XII and his allies were allowed safe passage to Sweden.

In Sweden the young Orlyk was signed up in the Swedish royal guard until 1716, when he began his studies at Lund University. There he spent two years and received a good education: he studied music (and became a proficient lute player), philosophy and metaphysics, and became fluent in Latin and several other European languages. After two more years in the king's service, his father moved to Germany in 1720 and took his son with him. There with the help of his father in 1721 he received a lieutenant's post in the cavalry guard of Saxony. His service there didn't last long, as in 1726 Russia demanded his extradition from Saxony, and the young officer moved first to Austria and then to Poland, where he became an adjutant of the crown hetman. Eventually Orlyk allied himself with the pro-French party within the court that was trying to restore Stanisław Leszczyński to the Polish throne. Orlyk acted as a secret liaison between Józef Poniatowski and the French ambassador in Warsaw.

== In the French secret service ==
In 1729, Orlyk was entrusted with the mission to bring the exiled former king Stanisław Leszczyński from France to Poland upon the death of king August II. For this mission, he was issued false travel documents and went to Paris, disguised as a Swedish officer Gustav Bartel. In Fontainebleau he met Leszczyński and obtained a promise from him to restore his father Pylyp Orlyk as hetman of Ukraine in exchange for his services. In Paris he also met Cardinal Fleury, the first minister of Louis XV, with whom he discussed the prospects for Stanisław Leszczyński's restoration in Poland. In 1730 he entered into French diplomatic service and was sent on a secret mission to Istanbul to set up an anti-Russian coalition with the Turks and the Crimean Tatars. Two years later he was again dispatched to Istanbul and from there to the Crimean khan Qaplan I Giray, before whom he urged the Tatars to attack Russia and help him in his cause.

After the death of Polish King August August II in 1733, as per his agreement with the French, Stanisław Leszczyński was brought from Paris to Warsaw along with a million florins necessary to secure Leszczyński's election with bribes. On Orlyk's return to Paris, Louis XV rewarded him with a diamond ring, while Queen Marie – the daughter of Stanisław Leszczyński – gave him her portrait adorned with precious stones. However, in less than 3 years, Leszczyński lost the throne of Poland and had to flee to Königsberg, from where Grégoire Orlyk brought him back to France. In 1734 and 1735 Orlyk made further trips to Turkey and to Crimea and in 1737 to Sweden, fostering an anti-Russian alliance that did not materialize, despite his efforts. Louis XV contemplated appointing him French ambassador to Turkey, but under pressure from St. Petersburg he changed his mind. In 1740s Grégoire Orlyk proposed to the king an ambitious plan of resettling Ukrainian Cossacks in the Rhine region under French protection; however, this too was dropped because of Turkey's objections. Later on, Orlyk belonged to the special intelligence service of Louis XV – the Secret du Roi – and went on clandestine missions to many European countries, for which he received praise from numerous quarters, including the highest decorations from France, Poland and Sweden.

== Military leader ==
In 1747 through marriage, Grégoire Orlyk acquired substantial wealth and bought a colonel's commission in the king's Royal suédois regiment. He fought in the Seven Years' War in Europe, distinguishing himself in the battle of Rosbach and the siege of Charleroi. For his exploits in battle, he was given the title of comte and was promoted to the junior general's rank of Maréchal de camp. In 1759 he commanded an army corps under the marshal of France the comte de Broglie, and was further promoted to the rank of lieutenant-general. On November 14, 1759, at the battle near the German town of Minden, he was fatally wounded in the chest and died on the same day.

== Legacy ==
Grégoire Orlyk
- Coat of arms
- Noble family: Orlyk

Upon the death of his father Pylyp Orlyk, Grégoire Orlyk had become the unofficial leader of Ukrainian émigrés in Europe. While in France, he met with Voltaire several times and advised Voltaire on his work History of Charles XII, King of Sweden (1731).

The first biography of Grégoire Orlyk was by the historian Elie Borschak, who published Hryhor Orlyk, France's Cossack General in 1956. This biography contained many interesting and new discoveries about Orlyk. However, this book made the erroneous claim that the Orly commune near Paris was named after Grégoire Orlyk, who had his estate in the area. This is false as the name derives from Aureliacum and has been in use at least since the 8th century CE.

In 2006 voluminous records of Orlyk's clandestine correspondence with Louis XV within the Secret du Roi were discovered in the French archives and are being studied.

== Literature ==
- Iryna Dmytrychyn. Grégoire Orlyk – Un Cosaque ukrainien au service de Louis XV. L'Harmattan, Paris. ISBN 2-296-00188-2
- Orest Subtelny. Ukraine. A history. University of Toronto press. 1994. ISBN 0-8020-7191-0.
- Borschak Е. Hryhor Orlyk, France's Cossack General, Toronto, 1956
