= Johannes Wahlström =

Swedish journalist and filmmaker

Johannes Wahlström (born 1981) is a Swedish journalist and filmmaker.

== Background and career ==
Wahlström was born in 1981. His father is Israel Shamir. Wahlström says he grew up in Jaffa, Moscow, and Stockholm. He carries a Master's degree in Social Anthropology, a Master´s degree in Media and Communications from the Department of Media Studies (JMK), and a Bachelors degree in Political Science from Stockholm University. After completing his master's thesis in media and communication at the Department of Media Studies (JMK) at Stockholm University Wahlström founded the website IMEMC.

== Work ==
Wahlström has worked as a journalist in Sweden, Ukraine, Russia, and Palestine on behalf of Aftonbladet, SVT, Journalisten and Fria Tidningar and has worked for the Alternative information centre in the Palestinian territories and the Swedish Institute in Russia. He is the author of five books on the relationship between knowledge and power, published by B-B-B-Books.

=== Experimenten ===
Together with producer Bo Lindquist, Wahlström created the TV-series Experimenten. The series, aired in three parts on SVT and unearthed how scientific fraud at the Karolinska Institute had resulted in the death of a number of patients, amounting to the firing of Professor Paolo Macchiarini. The series was awarded the 2016 AAAS Kavli Science Journalism Awards, with the motivation that the documentary "is true investigative journalism of the highest order, and the producers told the complex story with the utmost skill and artistry. Ultimately, it is a cautionary tale that anyone who works in clinical research would be well advised to watch and to heed."

=== Mediastan ===
Wahlström directed the documentary film Mediastan. The film was produced by Ken Loach's film company Sixteen Films and premiered in the fall of 2013 at the Raindance Film Festival in London. In February 2014, the film premiered on US television station LinkTV, with the following description: "Mediastan depicts the boundaries of freedom of speech, and boldly ventures into the minds of those who shape our understanding of the world".

According to the Hollywood Reporter, Mediastan was seen by 500,000 people during the UK premiere weekend.

=== Cablegate ===
Wahlström played an active role in the leak of US state department cables known as Cablegate that was released by WikiLeaks. Being the only Swedish journalist with full access to the WikiLeaks material he produced articles and TV-programs for among others Svenska Dagbladet, Aftonbladet and Dokument inifrån at Swedish Television. In the SR program Studio Ett he was interviewed as a representative of Wikileaks, during which he criticized Swedish media for having a power dependent view of the world.

The US journalist Alex Gibney has claimed that Wahlström "helped to engineer a vilification campaign against the two women who accused Mr. Assange of sexual assaults." To this Wahlström responded that "regarding Gibneys freshly invented and baseless allegation against myself- the only vilification campaign that I have ever engineered is against corrupt propagandists masquerading as journalists".

=== Ordfront ===
According to Aftonbladet, in 2005 Wahlström published an article in Ordfront entitled "Israel's Regime Controls the Swedish Media" in which he claimed that the Israeli government was pressing journalists in Sweden to prevent information about the Israeli-Arab conflict form being published. Ordfront later issued a public apology and ceased to publish articles by Wahlström. In 2009 Wahlström created the distribution platform Samarbetet together with Ordfront and a number of other independent Swedish magazines.
