= Pylyp Orlyk =

Zaporozhian Cossack starshyna and diplomat; Hetman-in-exile (1672–1742)

- Пилип Орлик

Hetman of the Zaporozhian Host (in exile)
- In office April 5, 1710 – May 24, 1742
- Preceded by: Ivan Mazepa

Personal details
- Born: October 11 (21), 1672 Kosuta, Polish–Lithuanian Commonwealth (now Kasuta, Belarus)
- Died: May 26, 1742 Jassy, Principality of Moldavia (now Iași, Romania)
- Spouse: Hanna Hertsyk (m. 1698)
- Children: 8 children, including Grégoire Orlyk
- Education: Kyiv Mohyla Academy
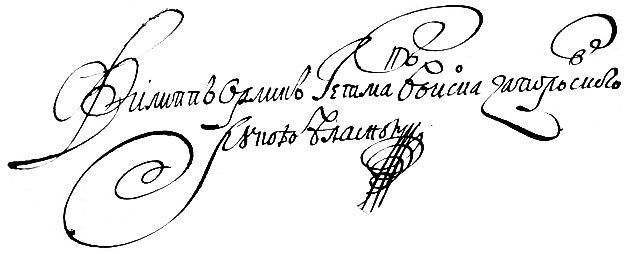
- Signature

Pylyp Stepanovych Orlyk (Old Ukrainian: Филипп(ъ) Орлик(ъ), modern Ukrainian: Пилип Степанович Орлик; Polish: Filip Orlik; October 21 [O.S. October 11] 1672 – May 26, 1742) was a Zaporozhian Cossack statesman, diplomat and member of Cossack starshyna. Described as the first Ukrainian political emigrant, he served as the hetman in exile from 1710 to 1742. He was a close associate of hetman Ivan Mazepa, and the author of the Constitution of Pylyp Orlyk.

== Early life and education ==
Pylyp Orlyk was born in the village of Kosuta, Ashmyany county, Grand Duchy of Lithuania (Vileyka district of modern-day Belarus), on November 1, 1673. Pylyp Orlik came from an old noble family of the Nowina coat of arms. The family name appeared in the form Orlik or Orlicki. The family most likely came to the Kingdom of Poland from Bohemia in the 15th century, during the Hussite Wars, and settled in western Belarus. Pylyp's father Stefan Orlik was killed in the Battle of Chocim against the Turks on November 11, 1673, fighting in the ranks of the Polish-Lithuanian army, a year after his son's birth. Pylyp's mother was Irena née Małachowski of the Hrymal coat of arms. Although Orlyk's father was Catholic his mother was Orthodox and baptized her son in that rite.

Orlyk first studied at the Jesuit college in Vilnius and until 1694 at Kyiv Mohyla Academy, where he was patronized by philosophy professor and future patriarchal locum tenens Stefan Yavorsky. With Yavorsky's help, in 1693 he was appointed secretary of the consistory of Kiev metropolis. In 1699 Orlyk became a senior member of Hetman Ivan Mazepa's General Military Chancellery and in 1706 was appointed general chancellor, serving as Mazepa's closest aide. On this position he facilitated the hetman's secret correspondence with the Poles and Swedes, and assisted Mazepa in his efforts to form an anti-Russian coalition.

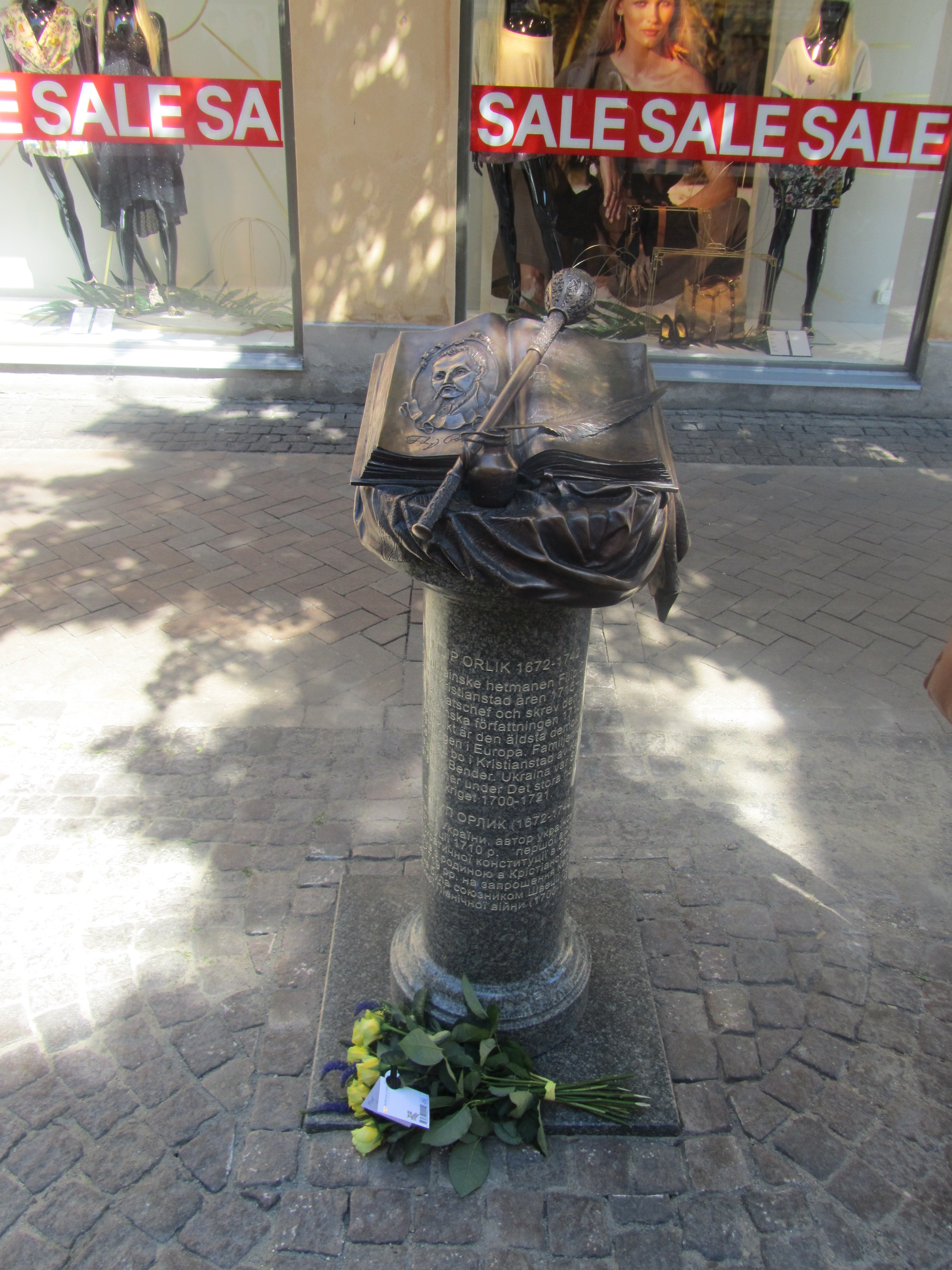
Monument dedicated to Ukrainian hetman Pylyp Orlyk in Kristianstad, Sweden, where he lived in exile

== Hetman in exile ==
After the Battle of Poltava in 1709, he escaped together with Hetman Ivan Mazepa and king Charles XII of Sweden to Bender in the Principality of Moldavia, where Mazepa soon died. Pylyp Orlyk was then chosen as a Hetman by the Cossacks and the Swedish king Charles XII. Realizing the whole difficulty of his new position, in his inaugural speech to Charles Orlyk used Baroque allegories, comparing his burden of rule over Ukraine to that of Atlas holding the sky, and his attempts to liberate the country from tyranny to the heroic deeds of Theseus and the Argonauts. While in Bender, Orlyk worked on a document which is sometimes considered to be one of the first state constitutions in Europe, although its roots lay in the earlier tradition of pacta conventa, a form of agreement between the monarch and nobility of the Polish-Lithuanian Commonwealth. This Constitution of Pylyp Orlyk was confirmed by Charles XII and named Orlyk protector of Ukraine.

Between 1711 and 1714, together with Crimean Tatars and small groups of Cossacks, Orlyk carried out unsuccessful raids into Right-bank Ukraine. Afterwards, Pylyp Orlyk now together with several other Cossacks followed the Swedish king Charles XII to Sweden via Vienna and Stralsund. Orlyk with his family and about 40 other Cossacks arrived in Ystad, Sweden in late November 1715. After some months in Ystad they lived in the city of Kristianstad for some years. Orlyk and his family left Stockholm in 1720 but as late as 1747 his widow and children received financial support from the Parliament of Sweden. From Sweden Orlyk first went to Hamburg, Hanover, Prague, Wrocław and Kraków, where he left his family to stay in a monastery. Orlyk stayed in Poland until March 1722, when he went to Khotyn in Ottoman Moldavia. From there he went on to Thessaloniki. In 1734 he moved to the Sultan's residence in Căușeni, Moldavia. He then stayed in Iași, and from late 1739 in Bucharest.

In addition to the Constitution of Pylyp Orlyk, he wrote numerous proclamations and essays about Ukraine. Orlik is also the author of a comprehensive Dziennik Podróżny, 3000-pages long diary, covering the years 1720-1732. The diary is written in Polish typical of the 18th century, with many interjections from Latin or Polonized Latin words. Some words from Church Slavonic, Turkic, Tatar and a few Ukrainianisms also appear. The diary also contains passages written in French and Latin.

== Death ==
Pylyp Orlyk died on 4 June 1742 in Jassy, Principality of Moldavia (today Iași, Romania). His place of burial is unknown.

== Legacy ==
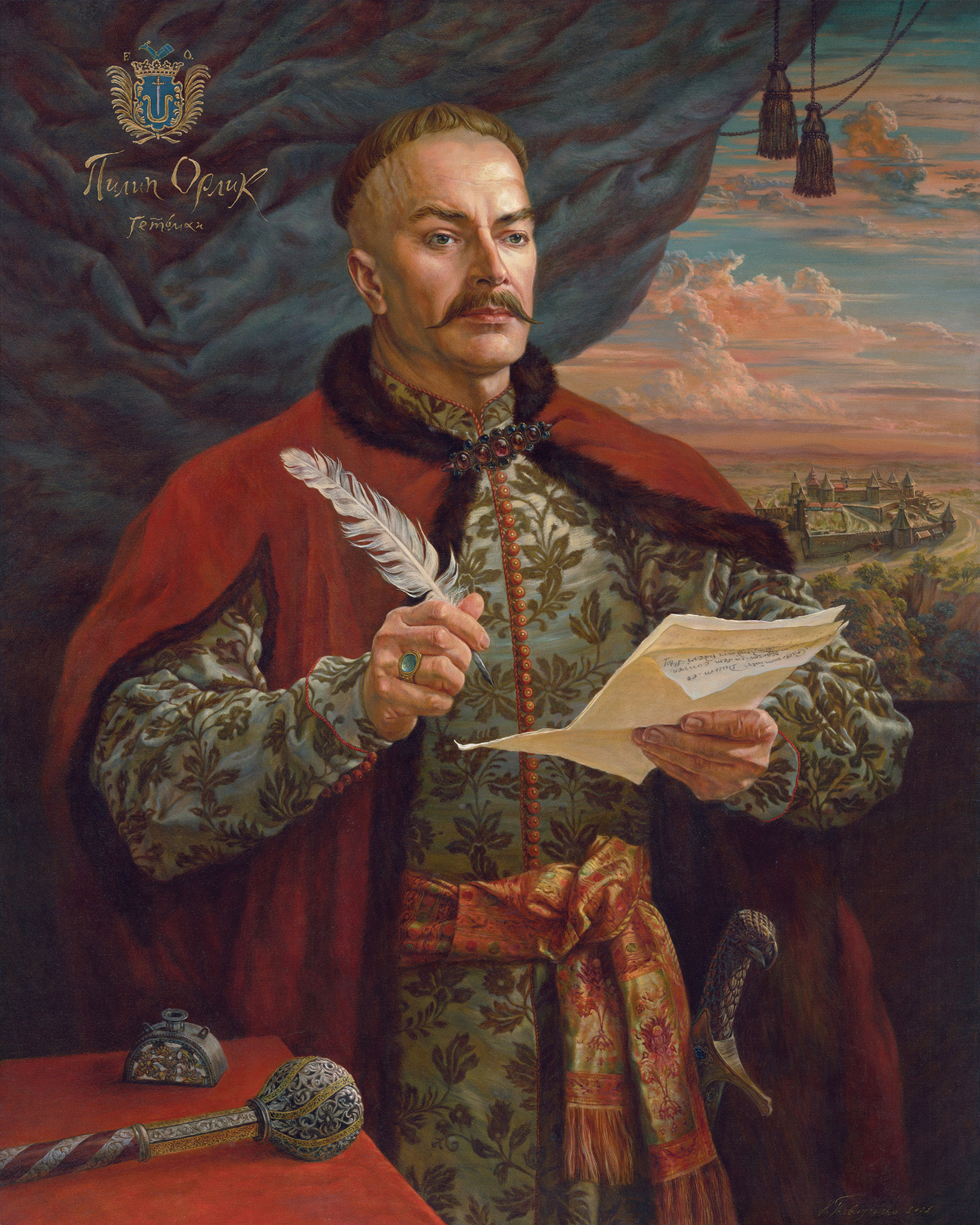
Historical reconstruction by Natalia Pavlusenko, 2021

In 2011 a monument dedicated to Pylyp Orlyk was erected in Kristianstad, Sweden on a building Ukrainian hetman lived in 1716–1719 years to celebrate tercentenary of Pylyp Orlyk's constitution. The authors of the monument are Borys Krylov and Oles Sydoruk.

104 streets and 22 alleys of Ukrainian settlements are named after Pylyp Orlyk. The streets of Vileik (Belarus) and Kristianstad (Sweden) are also named after the Hetman.

The National Bank of Ukraine issued two silver coins dedicated to Pylyp Orlyk (2002) and the first Ukrainian Constitution to Pylyp Orlyk (2010).

Ukrainian State Enterprise of Postal Service "Ukrposta" issued stamps in honor of Pylyp Orlyk (1997) and his Constitution (2010).

Ukrainian MPs and representatives of the Ukrainian diaspora in the U.S. established the Pylyp Orlyk International Prize in 2007, which is annually presented in Kiev to prominent Ukrainian and foreign lawyers. The award is currently presented by the International International Charitable Foundation for the People's Hero Mark Paslawsky.

The name of Hetman Pylyp Orlyk was given: Nikolaev International Classical University, Non-state think tank in Ukraine – Institute of Democracy in Kyiv and 43rd reservoir hut in Lviv.

=== Monuments and memorial signs to Hetman Pylyp Orlyk ===
The monuments of the Hetman and memorial signs of the first Ukrainian Constitution were installed in Kosuta (Belarus) (2006), Baturyn (Ukraine) (2009), Bendery (Moldova) (2010), Kyiv (Ukraine) (2011), Orlyk in the Poltava region (Ukraine) (2011), Kristianstad (Sweden) (2011) and Ivano-Frankivsk (Ukraine) (2012).

In Baturyn, on the Maidan of Hetman glory, towering monument «Hetmans. Prayer for Ukraine», in the form of a sculptural group of five Ukrainian hetmans: Demian Ihnatovych, Ivan Samoylovych, Ivan Mazepa, Kyrylo Rozumovsky and Pylyp Orlyk. Hetman in emigration Pylyp Orlyk stands beside his mentor Ivan Mazepa. The sculptural composition symbolizes the unity of their thoughts. Sculptures: Nikolai and Bogdan Mazura. Monument «Hetmans. Prayer for Ukraine» is solemnly opened on the Day of Cathedral of Ukraine, January 22, 2009. with the participation of the President of Ukraine Viktor Yushchenko.

== Personal life ==
Pylyp Orlyk
- Coat of arms
- Noble family: Orlyk

Pylyp Orlyk married Hanna Hertsyk in on November 13, 1698. She was of Jewish descent, a daughter of the colonel Pavlo Semenovych Hertsyk (a close ally of Mazepa) of the Poltava regiment. Pylyp and Hanna had eight children. They were:

- Anastasiya Orlyk (1699–1728) – born in Poltava. Married the Swedish nobleman and officer Johan Stenflycht (1681–1758) in 1723. They had two sons:
  - Carl Gustaf (1724–1758) – colonel in the French regiment Royal Pologne.
  - Filip (1726–1739) – died in Hamburg.
- Grégoire Orlyk (French: Grégoire Comte d'Orlik; November 5, 1702 – † November 14, 1759) – born in Baturyn, Ukraine. His godfather was Hetman Ivan Mazepa. He studied at Lund University (1717–1718). After leaving Sweden in 1720 he first lived with his mother in Kraków, Poland. He later became a Lieutenant General in France where he called himself Comte d'Orlik. Although he kept the contact with Sweden and in 1742 he also visited Stockholm. In 1747 he married a French noblewoman, but they didn't have any children. He was killed in 1759 at the Battle of Minden in Germany where he also is buried.
- Mykhailo Orlyk (1704–?) – born in Baturyn, Ukraine. His godfather was Hetman Ivan Mazepa.
- Varvara Orlyk – born in Baturyn, Ukraine. Her godfather was Hetman Ivan Mazepa.
- Yakiv Orlyk (1711–?) – born in Bender, Ottoman Empire. His godfather was king Charles XII of Sweden.
- Marta Orlyk (1713–?) – born in Bender, Ottoman Empire. Her godfather was king Stanisław Leszczyński of Poland.
- Maryna Orlyk (1715–?) – born in Altefähr, Rügen, Swedish Pomerania. Her godparents were king Charles XII of Sweden's sister Ulrika Eleonora and king Stanisław Leszczyński of Poland.
- Kateryna Orlyk (November 5, 1718–?) – born in Kristianstad, Skåne, Sweden and probably died already in 1719.

== See also ==
- Constitution of Pylyp Orlyk
- Hetman of Zaporizhian Cossacks

== Bibliography ==
- Walczak-Mikołajczakowa, Mariola; Mikołajczak, Aleksander (2021). "Kilka uwag o języku i kontekście kulturowym Diariusza podróżnego hetmana Filipa Orlika". Poznańskie Studia Polonistyczne. Seria Językoznawcza. 28 (2).
- (in French) Jean-Benoit Scherer, Annales de la Petite-Russie, ou Histoire des Cosaques-Saporogues et des Cosaques de l'Ukraine (Adamant Media Corporation, 2001)
- Sobol, Walentyna (2021). Filip Orlik (1672-1742) i jego diariusz [Pylyp Orlyk (1672-1742) and His Diary] (in Polish). Wydawnictwa Uniwersytetu Warszawskiego.
