= Hanna Hertsyk =

Personal details
- Born: Hanna Pavlivna Hertsyk unknown Poltava
- Died: Around 24 January 1752 unknown
- Spouse: Pylyp Orlyk
- Children: 3 sons (including Grégoire Orlyk), 5 daughters
- Parent(s): Pavlo Hertsyk, Iryna Yablonska

Hanna Hertsyk (died around 1752), known in Europe as Anna d'Orlik, (Note: See document below.) was the wife of Pylyp Orlyk, Hetman of Ukraine (r. 1708–1742). She is known for supporting her husband in the fight for an independent Ukraine during the Great Northern War, as well as taking responsibility for Orlyk's affairs during his diplomatic missions in Europe. She joined him in exile and lived in Sweden in 1709–21, during which time she corresponded with several rulers in Europe to support her husband's cause. She was the daughter of Pavlo Semenovych Hertsyk.

== Biography ==
Hanna Hertsyk was the daughter of Pavlo Hertsyk, a Poltavan colonel and General Osavul, and his wife Iryna Yablons'ka.. The Hertsyk family were Ukrainian Cossacks of Christianized Ashkenazi Jewish origin.

In 1698, she married Pylyp Orlyk, the chancellor (писар, lit. scribe) for the Poltava regiment. This marriage contributed to Orlyk's career: through marriage, Hanna brought him villages in the Starodub, Chernihiv and Poltava regions, which allowed him to become a wealthy magnate.

She supported the political views of her husband about separation from the Tsardom of Muscovy. Following the turning of Mazepa against Peter I in 1708 and the defeat of the Swedes and Ukrainians at the Battle of Poltava in 1709, the Orlyks, along with Mazepa and the Zaporozian starshyna, were forced to emigrate. In exile her husband was elected Hetman after the death of Mazepa. Anna had already given birth to three sons by 1711, one of whom was the godson of the Swedish king Charles XII (Yakiv), and the other - Ivan Mazepa (Hryhor).

During their exile, it was Hanna who assumed most of the responsibility for the children (their family by now numbered seven) while Pylyp traveled all over Europe in search of international support for the liberation of Ukraine and the unification of its two parts. Hanna was a bedrock for the Hetman in the Ottoman Empire, Sweden, and Germany.

Hanna gave birth to her daughter Maria on the Swedish island of Rügen. Hanna stayed with her family in Kristianstad for a long time. On 11 October 1720 the Orlyks left Sweden. Hanna first traveled to Hannover, then to Wrocław, where she and her children hid in a monastery from Muscovite spies. In 1721, her son Yakiv suddenly died. For a while she lived with her daughters, Varvara and Maria, in Stanislaviv.

She, along with her son Hryhor, was in correspondence with the various German princes, Polish magnates and the Kings of Sweden, trying to help in the affairs of her husband. In 1747, Swedish King Frederick I gave her a small pension. It is unknown when or where she died.

== Family ==
Husband: Pylyp Orlyk (1672-1742). Eight children;

- Nastya or Anastasiya-Teodora (1699-1728), the wife of the Swedish Count Johan Steinflicht
- Maria-Hanna or Maryna or Mariann (1710, according to other data: 1715 - after 1750)
- Catherine (1718-1719)
- Hryhor-Petro (1702-1759), Lieutenant-General of the Royal Army of France
- Mykhailo (? - around 1722)
- Yakiv (1709-1721; according to other data from 1711 to 1722)
- Varvara (1712 - after 1750)
- Marta (1713-?, According to other data of 1714-?), The wife of Dzierzhanovsky

== Bibliography ==
- Білоусько О. А., Мокляк В. О. Нова історія Полтавщини. Друга половина XVI — друга половина XVIII століття. — С. 206.
- Борщак І. Великий мазепинець Григор Орлик. Генерал-поручник Людовика XV (1742—1759). — Ню-Йорк : Восьмий курінь УПС ім Григора Орлика, 1972. — 1972. — 222 с.
- Сергій Павленко. Оточення гетьмана Мазепи: соратники та прибічники. — Київ : Вид. дім «КМ Академія», 2008. — 602 с. — ISBN 966-518-259-5.
- Білоусько О. А., Мокляк В. О. Нова історія Полтавщини. Друга половина XVI — друга половина XVIII століття. — С. 206.
