= Michael Tendler =

Russian-Swedish Physicist (born 1947)

Michael Tendler (Russian: Михаил Борисович Тендлер; born 1947) is a Swedish Physicist, currently (Emeritus) Professor of Fusion Plasma Physics at the Royal Institute of Technology, Stockholm (KTH). He is the Invited Professor at the Plasma Physics Laboratory Princeton University, USA and the Chubu University, Japan.

== Education ==
He was educated at Leningrad State University and graduated in Theoretical Physics in 1971 under the supervision of Academician Vladimir Perel. He left the Soviet Union in 1975 and received his doctorate from Uppsala University in 1978 under the supervision of Erik T. Karlsson.

== Career ==
Tendler moved to the Alfven Laboratory of the Royal Institute of Technology (KTH) as an associate professor in 1981 and gradually shifted his interest towards Fusion research. From 1992 until 2002 he was an invited professor at the Institut national de la recherche scientifique, Université du Québec, Canada. He became Full Professor at KTH in 1997. He is the former President of International Congress on Plasma Physics. In 2011 he became the Senior science expert at ITER. Tendler served on the Advisory Committees of National Institute of Fusion Research in Toki (Japan), the Institute of Plasma Physics of the Chinese Academy of Sciences and Saint Petersburg State Polytechnic University.

== Research ==
In the 70s Tendler focused on kinetic and statistical properties of gases and plasmas. Over time his research shifted towards thermonuclear fusion and has contributed to crucial issues like magnetic confinement and operation scenarios. In particular he has been instrumental in the theoretical understanding of Plasma rotation and L-H confinement mode transitions.

He elucidated the synergy of neoclassical and turbulence driven flows in a tokamak resulting in improved H–mode confinement. In latter years his research interests broadened into applications of Plasma physics, such as waste treatment and the implementation of the DC transmission technology employing High Temperature superconducting cables.

Recently, he contributed to novel ideas of enhancing fusion reactions revising the muon catalysis concept.

He also proposed the new plasma mechanism for the magnetic field generation in the Crab Nebula. The mechanism is based upon the development of a two-stream instability resulting from the supernova explosion which took place in 1054 and led to the formation of the Crab Nebula.

== Awards ==
Tendler was awarded the 1999 Ernst Mach Medal in Physics by the Czech Academy of Sciences. He was awarded honorary doctorates (Dr.h.c.) from the Ghent University, Belgium, the Russian Academy of Sciences, St. Petersburg State Polytechnical University and Chubu University in Japan. He is a (foreign) member of the Russian Academy of Sciences and the Royal Swedish Academy of Engineering Sciences.
