= Pavlo Shulzhenko =

Ukrainian serial killer

Pavel Hryhorovych Shulzhenko
- Павло́ Григо́рович Шульже́нко
- Born: Kolisnyky, Pryluky Regiment (now Ukraine)
- Died: 22 December 1740; Hlukhiv, Cossack Hetmanate
- Other name: Matsapura
- Criminal charges: Murder, rape, cannibalism
- Criminal penalty: Capital punishment (impalement)

Pavlo Hryhorovych Shulzhenko (Ukrainian: Павло́ Григо́рович Шульже́нко, died 22 December 1740), popularly known as Matsapura (Ukrainian: Мацапура) was a brigand from Left-bank Ukraine, who became notorious for a series of murders perpetrated by his gang in the territories of the Cossack Hetmanate, then an autonomous part of the Russian Empire. The especially cruel manner of his murders, which involved rape and consuming the flesh of some victims, made him a notable figure in Ukrainian popular culture.

== Biography ==
=== Early life and crimes ===
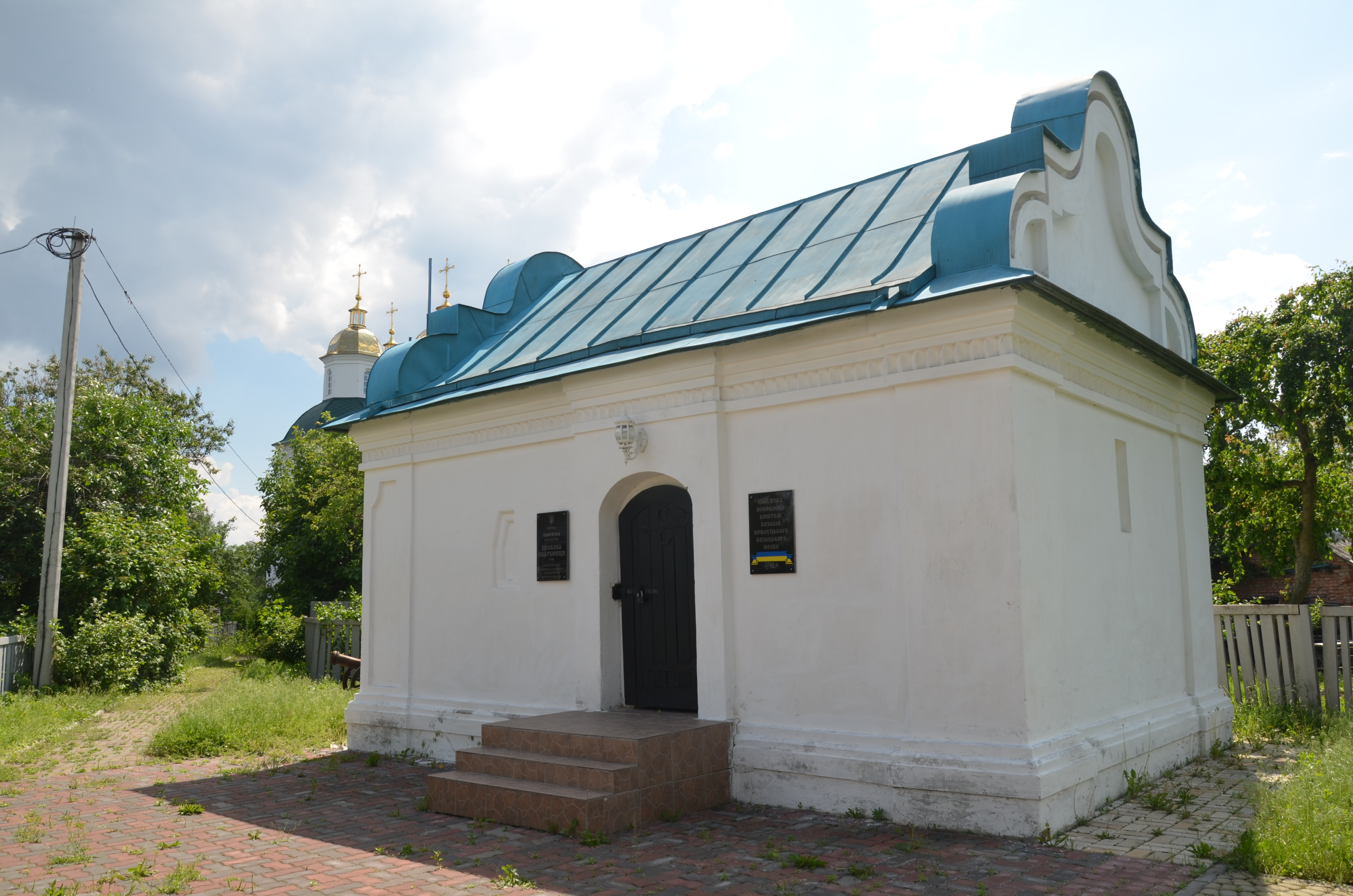
Regimental treasury in the city of Pryluky, where Matsapura was first imprisoned in 1735

Matsapura stemmed from the village of Kolisnyky, which at the time belonged to Pryluky Regiment. His father was one Hryhoriy Shulha. Due to troubles in his family, Matsapura would earn his livelihood as a travelling worker, performing casual work at nearby khutirs. According to materials of the investigation, he was a tall man with dark straw hair, grey eyes, long nose, broad shoulders and a shaven beard.

Matsapura's criminal career started in 1735, when he engaged in horse theft and small-scale robbery. After committing a crime against the property of certain Domoratsky, a member of Cossack starshyna, he was arrested and imprisoned in the regimental prison in Pryluky. During imprisonment, Matsapura was subjected to whipping, but after the horses stolen by him had been found, was granted a release. In the aftermath, he moved to the territory of Yahotyn sotnia, and together with several accomplices established a base near the khutir of Kantakuzivka. For almost three years, his gang continued to engage in robbery and theft of horses, but in 1738 Matsapura was arrested for a second time after stealing four horses from bunchuk comrade Andriy Horlenko in Stasivshchyna near Pryluky. After spending one more year in the local prison, he was ultimately released.

=== Murders ===
In late August 1739, Matsapura and his accomplice attacked and murdered three horilka merchants near the village of Losynivka, taking around one ton of their produce and hiding the victims' bodies in reeds. In late November, Matsapura was once again arrested an incarcerated in Pryluky. However, his participation in the murders could not be proven, and for his robberies he was sentenced to corrective labour, spending three months in the position of the prison's hangman. However, in late February 1740 Matsapura fled from imprisonment, and joined a gang together with six other accomplices. After establishing their base in the outskirts of khutir Romanykha near Lokhvytsia, they engaged in robbery, horse theft and brigandage. After attacking a group of ten horilka traders, the gang killed seven of them, hiding their bodies in the snow, while three others were able to flee. Following this crime, members of the gang dispersed and returned to their homes.

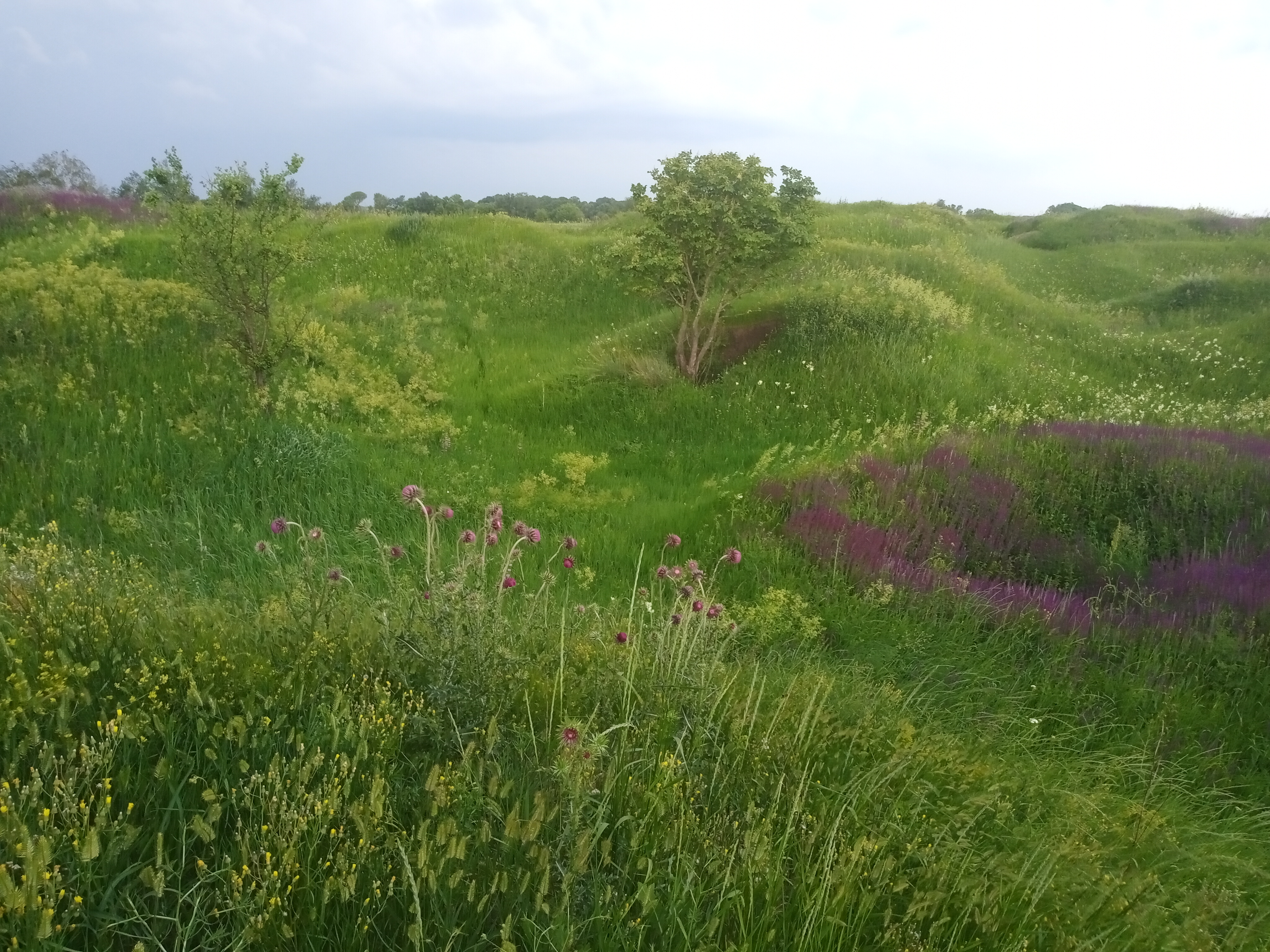
Modern-day view of the Telepen mound, where the main part of murders by Matsapura's gang took place

Matsapura spent the time until Easter (April 1740) in Romanykha, and then moved to the khutir of count Tolstoy in the outskirts of Pyriatyn. There he was joined by four local men, as well as several Zaporozhian Cossacks or Haidamaks. The gang engaged in racketeering, torturing local peasants with fire and demanding their money. Later they moved their base to Telepen, a Scythian mound located near the village of Lemeshivka, in the vicinity of the modern tripoint between Chernihiv, Kyiv and Poltava Oblasts. From there the gang attacked merchants passing through the area, murdering three people and forcing two others to deliver them around 1700 liters of horilka, as well as several horses and other items. The stolen goods were then sold, and valuables hidden underground or exchanged for alcohol. In order to eliminate witnesses, the gang also murdered several locals who were herding animals in the vicinity.

The gang's cruelty reached a new level after they kidnapped, raped and beat to death a woman from Zghurivka. This crime was followed by similar murders of four other females, one of whom turned out to be pregnant. One of the gang's members, a Haidamak called Ivan Taran, then offered to perform divination on the victim's fetus, cutting it out and hiding it in his sack. After the gang had murdered another woman near Valkivka on the road to Nosivka, Taran cut out her calves and also put them into the sack. After reaching Telepen, Taran cut out the unborn girl's heart and let each of the gang's 16 members throw it into the air and catch it, claiming that this ritual would save them from responsibility for committed crimes. The heart and the fetus were then eaten by Matsapura and his accomplices. In the aftermath, the criminals murdered another woman and engaged in a gang rape of a girl, cutting out parts of the victims' bodies and consuming them in boiled form.

=== Arrest, trial and execution ===
In late May, Matsapura left Telepen and moved to the village of Mykhailivka in modern-day Poltava Oblast. There he joined the gang of his old acquaintance, killing several merchants in the vicinity of Lubny. However, around that time Pyriatyn osavul Dorosh Bozhko received a complaint about gang activities from inhabitants of a nearby village, and organized the arrest of Matsapura's three former accomplices. Soon thereafter, Matsapura was arrested after engaging in petty theft at the khutir of Shelukhivshchyna. The detainees were transferred to Lubny, where on 24 July the regimental court sentenced them to death for murder and cannibalism. However, two days later the Lubny Regimental Chancellery appealed to the hetman's authority in Hlukhiv in order for it to take responsibility for the execution. On 3 August the General Military Chancellery confirmed the appeal and ordered Matsapura and his accomplices to be transported to Hlukhiv garrison prison.

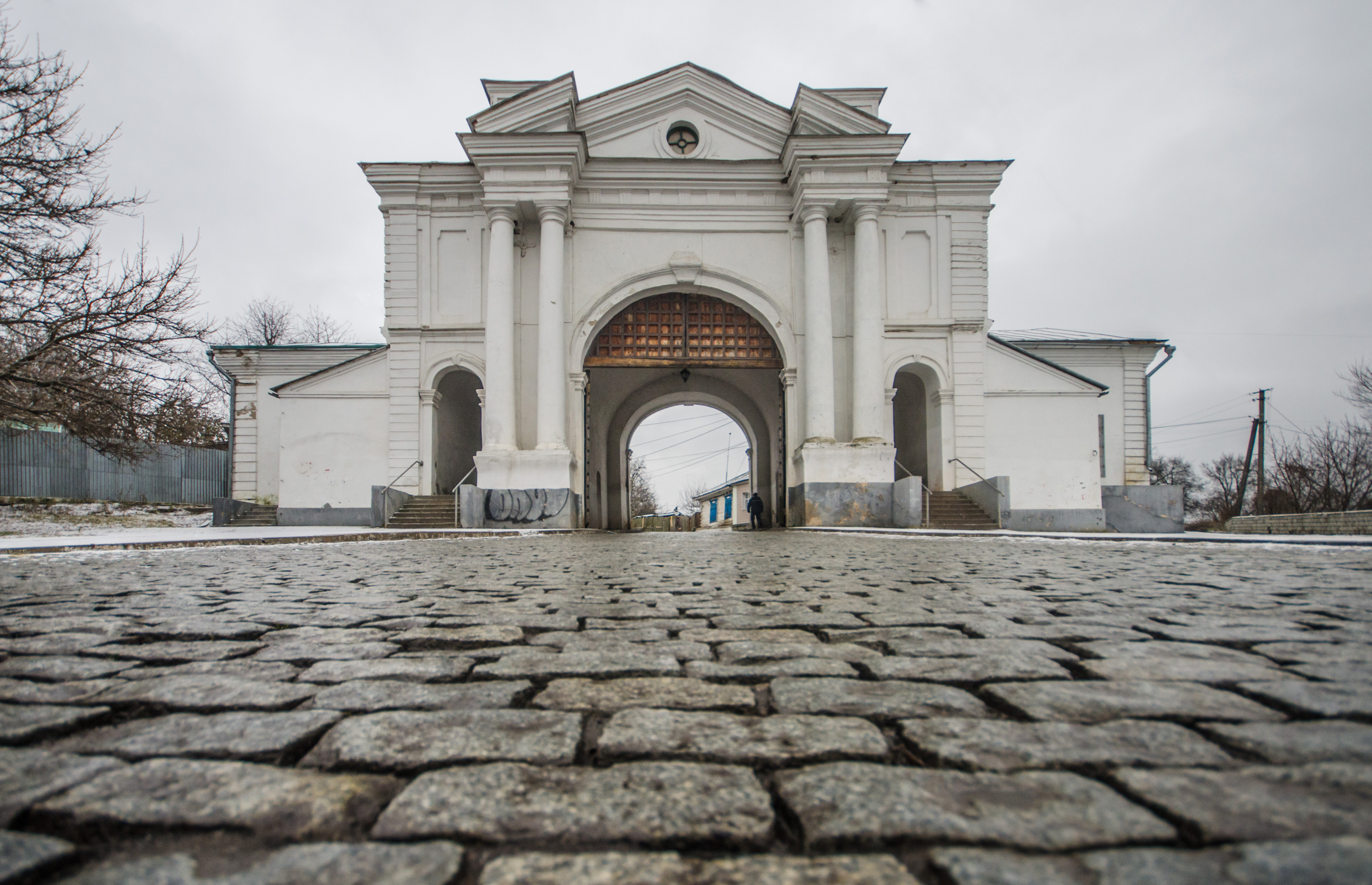
Kyiv Gates in Hlukhiv, where Matsapura was executed in December 1740

After further investigation, on 30 September 1740 the verdict of Lubny Chancellery was confirmed by the General Military Court, and on 4 October it was approved by a session of the General Military Chancellery headed by James Francis Edward Keith, who at the time presided over Governing Council of the Hetman Office. Matsapura was found guilty for "eating human flesh, which even unholy barbarians do not do". Initially, it was decided to execute the condemned by removing their ribs with hot pliers, dragging them by horses and breaking on the wheel on Telepen, where they had committed their crimes. However, as the mound was considered to be too remote for the execution to have effect on the public, only one of the gang members was executed there.

Having acknowledged his engagement in cannibalism under torture, Matsapura was able to escape the prison in Hlukhiv after his guard had fallen asleep. However, after covering some distance on foot in the direction of Krolevets, he was caught by local peasants and delivered to authorities. On 22 December 1740, on the Kyiv road in Hlukhiv, Matsapura's fingers, toes, ears and nose were cut off, after which he was impaled. Two other of his accomplices were quartered and broken on the wheel, but 12 other members of the gang were never caught.

== Legacy ==
Matsapura's case produced a shock among the population of Ukraine. His name is mentioned in Ivan Kotliarevsky's Eneida, where the criminal's likeness is depicted as being tortured in hell. Matsapura's name was also mentioned among notable criminals in articles of Kievskaya Starina magazine. In 1926 a critical historical study of the case was published by Kharkiv historian Mykola Horban. Matsapura's figure was also mentioned in writings by modern authors Yuri Andrukhovych and Oles Buzina.
