= General Officer Staff (Hetmanate) =

Council of high-ranking officers in the Cossack Hetmanate

The General Officer Staff (Ukrainian: Генеральна старшина, romanized: Heneralna starshyna) was a council of high-ranking officers who advised Hetman on all affairs. It was the highest state administration of Cossack Hetmanate. General officers took part in the Cossack Rada. In a peacetime the general officers acted as ministers. General officers along with colonels composed the Council of Officers.

It was created in 1648 and existed after the liquidation of the Cossack Hetmanate in 1764 until 1782. In an absence of a hetman, any members of the staff could have performed functions of the acting hetman. General officers were headed by the Hetman of Zaporizhian Host.

Aside of General Officers Staff there also were Regimental and Company officers staffs as part of administrative division of the Cossack Hetmanate. All officers were known as starshyna which literally means "a senior". In charge of regiments stood colonel (Ukrainian: полковник, romanized: polkovnyk) and in charge of companies stood captain (Ukrainian: сотник, romanized: sotnyk).

The staff consisted of nine members:

- Quartermaster general
- Judge advocate general – General Military Court
- Scribe general (pysar) – General Military Chancellery,
- Treasury general – General Treasury,
- two Adjutant generals (osavul),
- Ensign general (khorunzhyi)
- Bunchuk general (bunchuzhnyi)

== See also ==
- Cossack starshyna
- Governing Council of the Hetman Office
