= Black Council (disambiguation) =

Black Council (chorna rada) was a type of council (rada) of Ukrainian Cossacks.

Black Council (or Chorna rada in the context of Ukraine) may also refer to:

- Black Council of 1663, Cossack Rada meeting on 17–18 June 1663
- Black Council, novel by Panteleimon Kulish (1857)
- Black Council, historical TV series by Dovzhenko Film Studios (2000-2002)
- "Black Council", a fictional organization in The Dresden Files fantasy novel series
