= Council of Officers (Hetmanate) =

The Council of Officers (Ukrainian: Старшинська рада, romanized: Starshynska rada, or Рада старшин, Rada starshyn) functioned as the executive branch of the government of the Cossack Hetmanate, similar to the Cabinet of Ministers in modern Ukraine. It was composed out of the General Officer Staff (starshyna) and colonels (polkovnyky). The Council of Officers convened twice a year, at Christmas and Easter (at least, during the hetmanship of Ivan Mazepa).

== Description ==
The General Cossack Rada (the Hetmanate's Parliament, composed of representatives of all Regiments) elected the Hetman, and initially also the officers of the Council of Officers. Members of the Council also participated in sessions of the General Rada.

The starshyna registry of 1649 listed the names of eighteen officers. By 1657, only four of those (plus the new hetman Ivan Vyhovsky) were still alive; the rest had fallen in battle, or died of natural causes.

After the death of Bohdan Khmelnytsky (1657), the Council of Officers became the main state body that was electing the Hetman of the Zaporizhian Host as well as other key administrative state posts. It reviewed decisions of the General Chancellery, and appellation to the decisions of the General Court and the General Chancellery. The council consisted of the most wealthy and influential representatives of officers' families. After the complete abolition of Hetman post, it was subordinated to the Collegium of Little Russia for a short period.

During times of Kyrylo Rozumovsky (1750-64), the Council of Officers completely overtook all functions of the Cossack Rada.

== Key roles ==
- Decision on the most important political, administration and military issues
- Conducting diplomatic relations
- Headed financial and judicial institutions as well as the Armed Forces

== See also ==
- Cossack Rada
- Cossack starshyna
- Sich Rada
- General Military Chancellery
- General Military Court

== Bibliography ==
- Tairova-Yakovleva, Tatiana (2020). Ivan Mazepa and the Russian Empire (PDF). Montreal Kingston London Chicago: McGill-Queen's Press. p. 425. ISBN 978-0-2280-0309-0.
