= Distinguished Military Fellows =

Distinguished Military Fellows or Noble Army Fellows (Ukrainian: Значне військове товариство, Значні військові товариші) was a social stratum, which emerged in Ukraine during the second half of the 17th century and formed the core of noble estate in the Cossack Hetmanate. The majority of its members stemmed from the Cossack starshyna, but a large part also descended from the Ruthenian nobility.

== Formation ==
The formation of Distinguished Military Fellows was a result of the Ruin. During that period, the Hetmanate's government was unable to pay its officials due to political and economic instability, and instead resorted to providing them landed estates, mills, ponds or rights to distill alcohol in exchange for service. At first, those properties and privileges were provided on a temporary basis, but with time the holdings became hereditary, with peasants inhabiting them becoming dependent from their new landlords. As a result, a new de facto noble class, loyal to the Cossack state and composed of Orthodox Ukrainians, emerged to replace the old Polish and Polonized magnates and gentry.

== Structure ==
Distinguished Military Fellows built up the uppermost echelons of the starshyna. Among them were former Registered Cossacks, members of Ukrainian szlachta who supported the Cossack side during the wars against Poland, as well as separate distinguished Cossacks.

By the early 18th century separate ranks of Distinguished Military Fellows had emerged:

- Fellows of the Standard (Ukrainian: бунчукові товариші, literally "bunchuk comrades/fellows") - upper rank encompassing members of the immediate entourage of the hetman's administration, promoted into that status by the hetman's universals; during times of war, bearers of the rank had the privilege to personally accompany the hetman during campaigns;
- Military Fellows (Ukrainian: військові товариші) - middle rank, composed of military leaders in the central administration, directly subordinate to the General Military Chancellery;
- Fellows of the Banner (Ukrainian: значкові товариші) - lower rank, consisting of leading officials of regimental districts, promoted to the rank by colonels, and, later, by the General Military Chancellery.

== Status ==
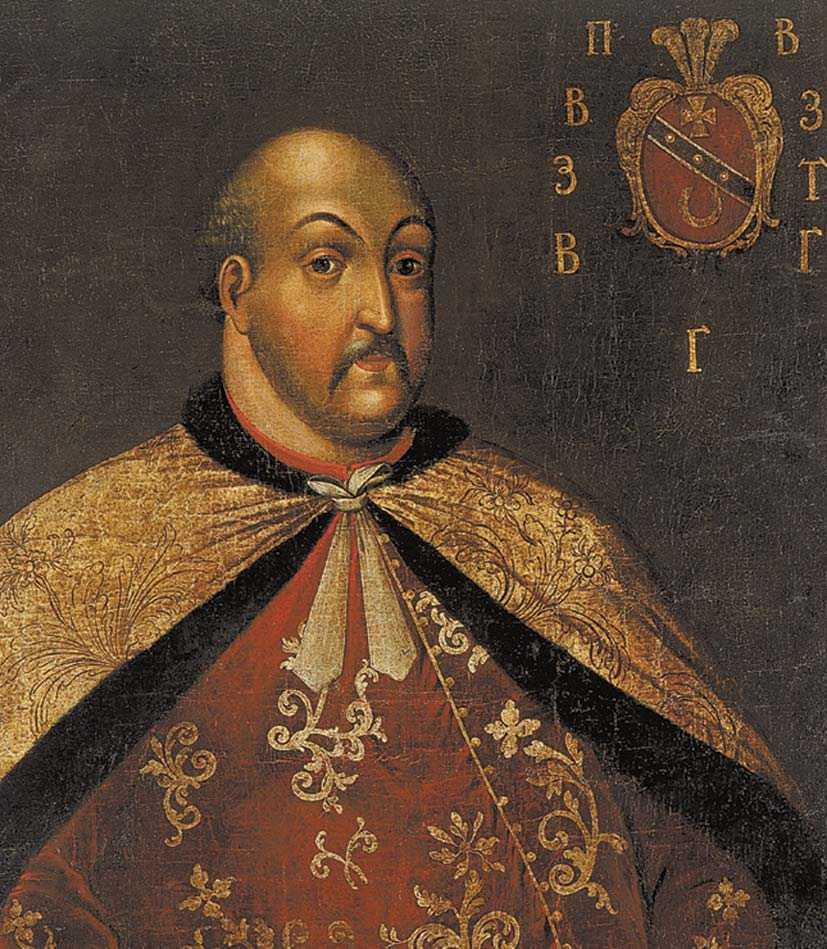
Portrait of Distinguished Military Fellow Hryhorii Hamaliia, late 17th century

Distinguished Military Fellows had their names included into special rosters (komputy), which served as a proof of their status. As members of the stratum became reluctant to accept new members, it gradually developed into a hereditary noble class.

Distinguished Military Fellows had an obligation to fulfill military and administrative functions, as well as to perform military service, either personally, or by providing a replacement from the rows of armed Cossacks. In exchange, members of the stratum received the privilege to own settled lands and exploit the labour of their population.

Distinguished Military Fellows had the right to take part in starshyna councils, serving as lawmakers, and were subject to special courts: Fellows of the Standard were subject to judicial power of the hetman, and, later, the General Military Court; lower ranks were subject to regimental courts. After the introduction of noble courts, Distinguished Military Fellows received the privilege to serve as subjects of their proceedings.

== Later development ==
A 1734 decree of the tsarist government defined the precise number of Fellows of the Banner in regiments, limiting their ranks to 420. This limitation was eventually overcome by establishing a separate group of "assigned to Fellows of the Banner", which was excluded from general Cossack jurisdiction.

According to a 1768 order by governor Pyotr Rumyantsev, membership in Fellows of the Banner was limited to children of Distinguished Military Fellows and Cossack starshyna. In 1785 the stratum of Distinguished Military Fellows was abolished altogether, with its members from the number of Fellows of the Standard and Military Fellows being incorporated into the ranks of Russian nobility. Only a part of Fellows of the Banner received the titles of nobility.

== Notable members ==
- Yuri Nemyrych
- Mazepa family
- Skoropadsky family
- Apostol family
- Horlenko family
- Kochubey family

== Bibliography ==
- Magocsi, Paul Robert (1996). A History of Ukraine. Toronto: University of Toronto Press. ISBN 0-8020-0830-5.
