= Pyotr Zavadovsky =

Russian statesman (1739–1812)

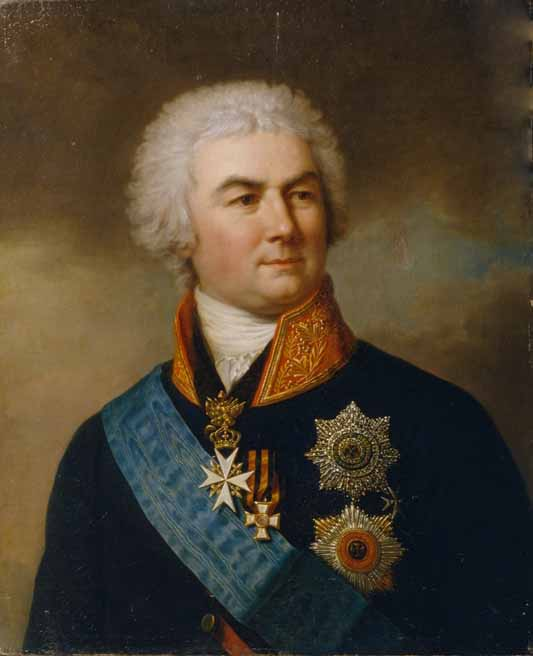
Portrait by Stepan Shchukin (1800s)

Count Pyotr Zavadovsky (Russian: Пётр Васи́льевич Завадо́вский, Ukrainian: Петро Завадовський; 1739–1812) was a Russian statesman of Ukrainian origin. He was a favourite (lover) of Russian empress Catherine the Great from 1776 to 1777.

== Ancestry ==
Pyotr (Petro) Zavadovsky was a descendant of Cossack starshyna from the area of Chernihiv, known since the times of hetman Ivan Samoilovych. His father Vasyl took part in campaigns against Poland and Turkey, and his brother Yakiv served as the last colonel of Starodub Regiment, and, in 1794, governor of Novhorod-Siverskyi.

== Career ==
After graduating from Kyiv Mohyla Academy, in 1767 Zavadovsky became a secretary at the Collegium of Little Russia. In 1774 he entered state service of the Russian Empire, and eventually received the title of count, receiving large landholdings in Ukraine and Belarus.

Count Zavadovsky was named official secretary to Catherine in 1775 and became her lover on 2 January 1776. He is described as serious and cultivated and he is regarded to have been genuinely in love with Catherine. Their relationship was tense because of the jealousy he felt toward Grigory Potemkin, who still had a relationship with Catherine, although Zavadovsky had replaced him in a sexual sense, and Potemkin was also said to have had difficulties accepting the situation. The relationship was ended because of the continuing pressure. In 1778, Catherine contemplated recalling him, but was then introduced to Ivan Rimsky-Korsakov. Zavadovsky became the highest official in the empire's educational system.

In 1780, he was appointed a privy councillor; in 1781, he became the director of the state bank. He later became a senator and, at the end of his life, the minister of education under Emperor Alexander I. On this position he contributed to the foundation of Kharkiv University (1805). In 1810 Zavadovsky headed the Department of Law at the State Council. He died in 1812 in Saint Petersburg.

== In popular culture ==
In the 2019 HBO miniseries Catherine the Great Zavadovsky is portrayed by Thomas Doherty.

== Sources ==
- "Завадовский, Петр Васильевич" . Brockhaus and Efron Encyclopedic Dictionary (in Russian). 1906.
- Simon Sebag Montefiore : Potemkin och Katarina den stora - en kejserlig förbindelse (Potemkin and Catherine the Great - an imperial commitment) (2006) (In Swedish)
