= Black Council (novel) =

1857 historical novel by Panteleimon Kulish

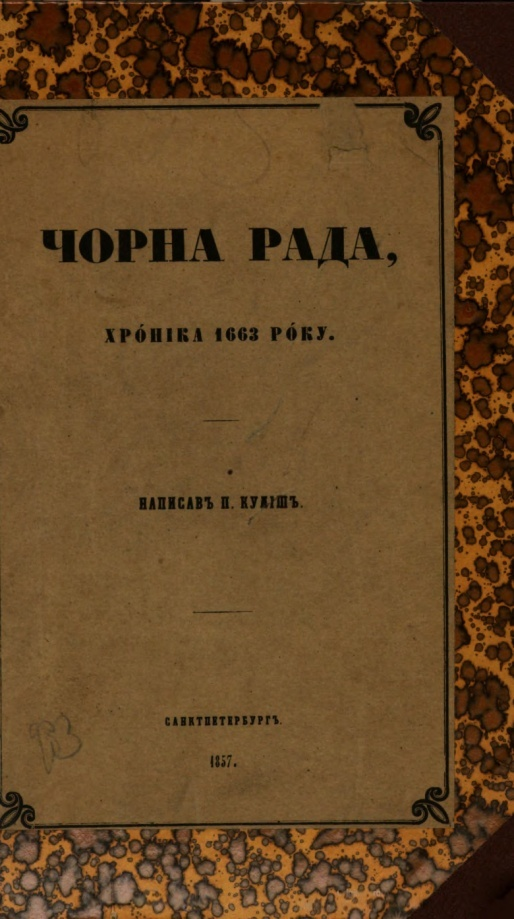
Front page of the novel's original edition

Black Council, a Chronicle of the Year 1663 (Ukrainian: Чорна рада, Хроніка 1663 року, romanized: Chorna rada, Khronika 1663 roku) is an 1857 historical novel by Ukrainian writer Panteleimon Kulish. Its plot is based on the Black Council of 1663, which resulted in the election of Ivan Briukhovetsky as Hetman of the Zaporozhian Host.

The book was published in both Ukrainian and Russian, though the two versions differ stylistically. It is recognized to be the first and most important Ukrainian historical novel.

== Plot ==
In summer of 1663 Pavoloch colonel Shram (Ukrainian: Шрам - "Scar"), an old Cossack who had originally served as a priest and fought in the Khmelnytskyi Uprising, arrives with his son and war companion Petro to the khutir of Khmaryshche (Ukrainian: Хмарище) in the vicinity of Kyiv. Shram's visit is kept secret from his formal superior, the Right-bank hetman Pavlo Teteria, who is despised by Eastern Orthodox Cossacks for his sympathy to Catholic Poland. In Khmaryshche Shram and his son meet the homestead's owner - Cherevan (Ukrainian: Черевань - "Big Belly"), a fellow Cossack who had become rich from war booty during the years following the uprising.

A kobzar staying in Cherevan's residence informs the host and his guests about the rise of Ivan Briukhovetsky, a former squire of Bohdan Khmelnytsky, who gained the trust of the late hetman's successor to establish control over the Hetmanate's treasury and fled to Zaporozhia with the stolen money. After using lavish gifts and populist promises in order to get elected kish otaman of Zaporozhian Sich, Briukhovetsky is now campaigning to become the Hetman of Zaporozhian Host. Upon hearing about the political turmoil, Shram opens up about the reason of his journey: he wants to meet Yakym Somko, the hetman of Left-Bank Ukraine, in order to persuade him to depose Teteria and reunite all Ukraine under one rule. Meanwhile Petro gets acquainted with Cherevan's daughter Lesia, and the two immediately fall in love. However, Cherevan's wife is reluctant to confirm her daughter's engagement with Shram's son.

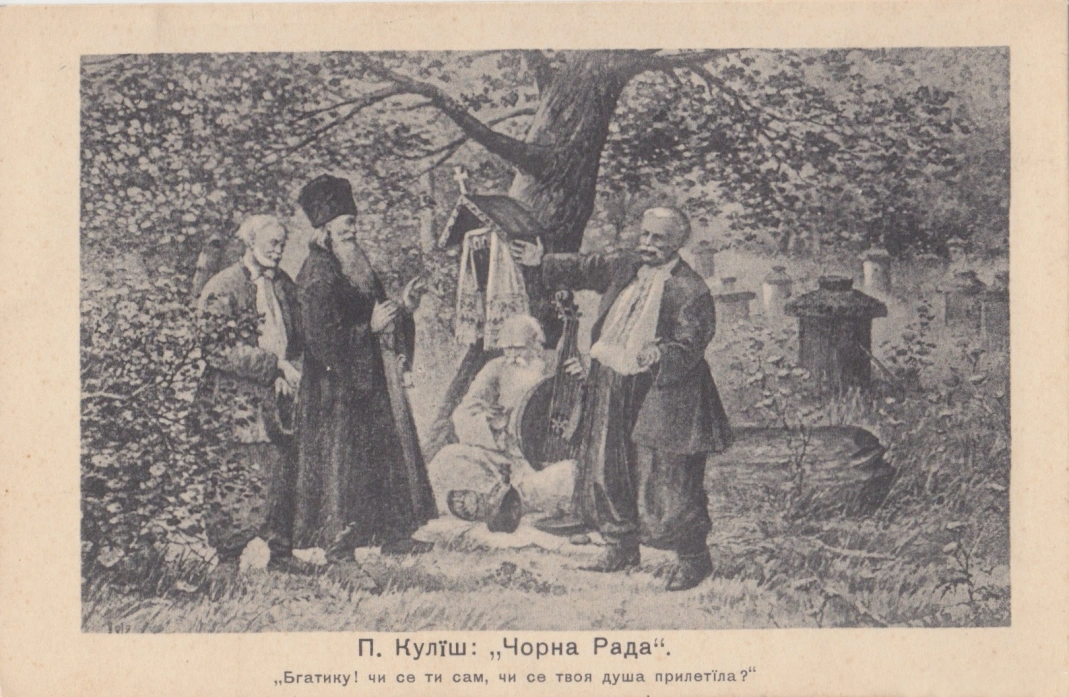
Shram (second from left) arriving to meet Cherevan (right)

Both families go on a pilgrimage to Kyiv, where old Zaporozhians are banqueting to celebrate their retirement from the Sich. In Kyiv Pechersk Lavra the travellers meet Somko, whose post is being contested by both Briukhovetsky and Nizhyn colonel Vasyl Zolotarenko. Petro learns that Lesia had been promised by Cherevans to marry Somko. After a banquet at the hetman's residence one of the guests, Kyrylo Tur, a Zaporozhian Cossack reputed to be a kharakternyk, kidnaps Lesia together with his companion. Petro pursuits the culprits and engages in a sword fight with Tur, who saves him from falling into a ravine. As a result of the fight, both men get wounded, and Tur is taken away by fellow Zaporozhians. Petro is sent to Khmaryshche in order to recuperate.

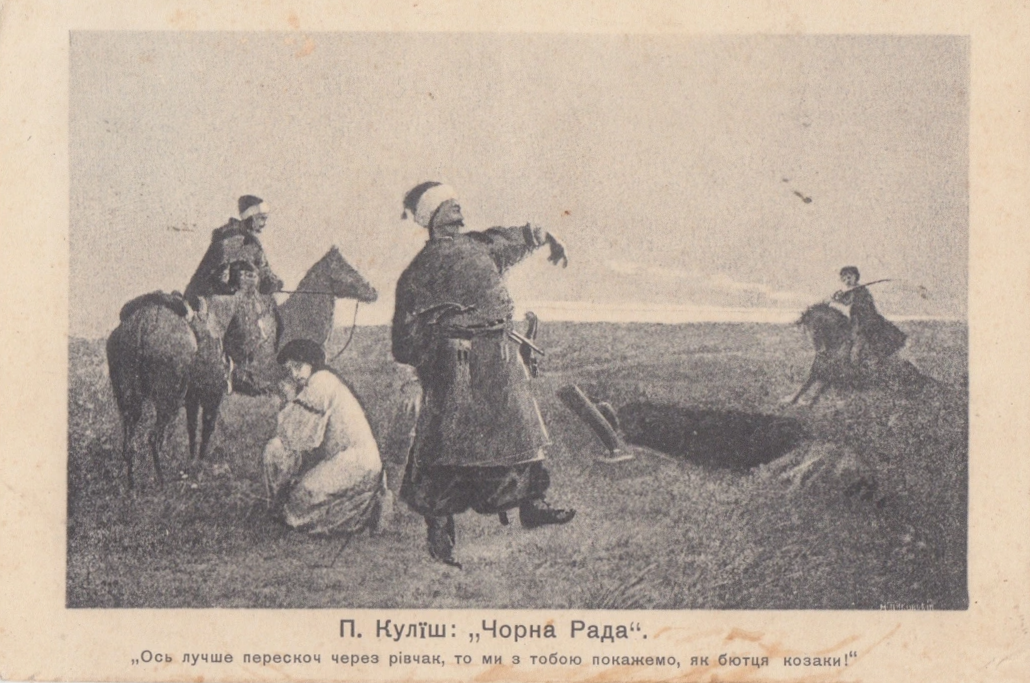
Petro (right) pursuing Lesia's kidnappers

On his way to a meeting with the Tsar's voivodes in Pereyaslav, Somko receives news that the colonels of Myrhorod, Poltava and Zinkiv regiments defected to Briukhovetsky after the latter's candidacy for hetmanship had been supported by Muscovite prince Romodanovsky. Meanwhile Shram, Petro and Cherevan with his wife and daughter arrive to the outskirts of Nizhyn, where they stay at the residence of osavul Gvyntovka, Cherevan's brother-in-law, who is a fierce critic of Briukhovetsky and his Zaporozhian supporters. There Petro once again meets Tur, who warns him about a planned attack of the common folk and Zaporozhians against Cossack starshyna in Nizhyn. Petro arrives to a location on the bank of Oster where Briukhovetsky has gathered his supporters, promising them to remove nobility and starshyna from power, and witnesses Tur being beaten with sticks by his fellow Cossacks for his attempt to kidnap Lesia. After surviving the punishment with dignity, Tur invites Petro to leave the ranks of Town Cossacks and join the Zaporozhians, once again telling him about the oncoming "revenge" against the Cossack elite.

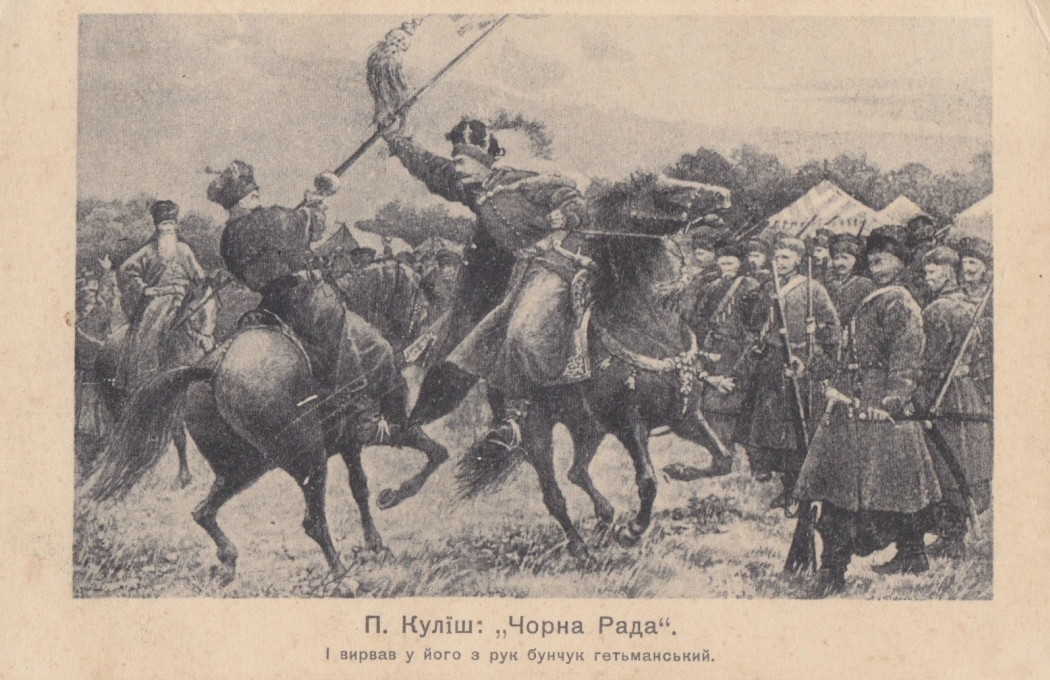
Somko and Briukhovetsky fighting for hetmanship

In the meantime, the elder Shram goes to Zolotarenko's residence in Baturyn, but on the way learns that the colonel had left in order to unite his forces with Somko and move on Nizhyn. However, Somko's scribe, a secret agent of Briukhovetsky, provokes unrest in the hetman's camp, and the townsfolk of Nizhyn revolts and joins Zaporozhian Cossacks after the son of a local official gets killed by a noble Cossack in a duel. A Cossack Rada is proclaimed in order to solve the conflict for hetman's bulava, and the opponents' hosts meet in a field under the supervision of Muscovite soldiers and boyars. A fight emerges between the supporters of Somko and Briukhovetsky, with the latter being joined by many defectors from among the starshyna, including Gvyntovka, his earlier vocal opponent. Bribed by Briukhovetsky, the Tsar's representative confirms him as the new hetman and allows him to capture and imprison Somko. Briukhovetsky's supporters celebrate their candidate's victory by robbing their opponents' camp and plundering the courts of rich inhabitants of Nizhyn. Many nobles and members of starshyna are killed by the common folk, burghers and Cossacks, who raid their residences and forcibly take their daughters as wives.

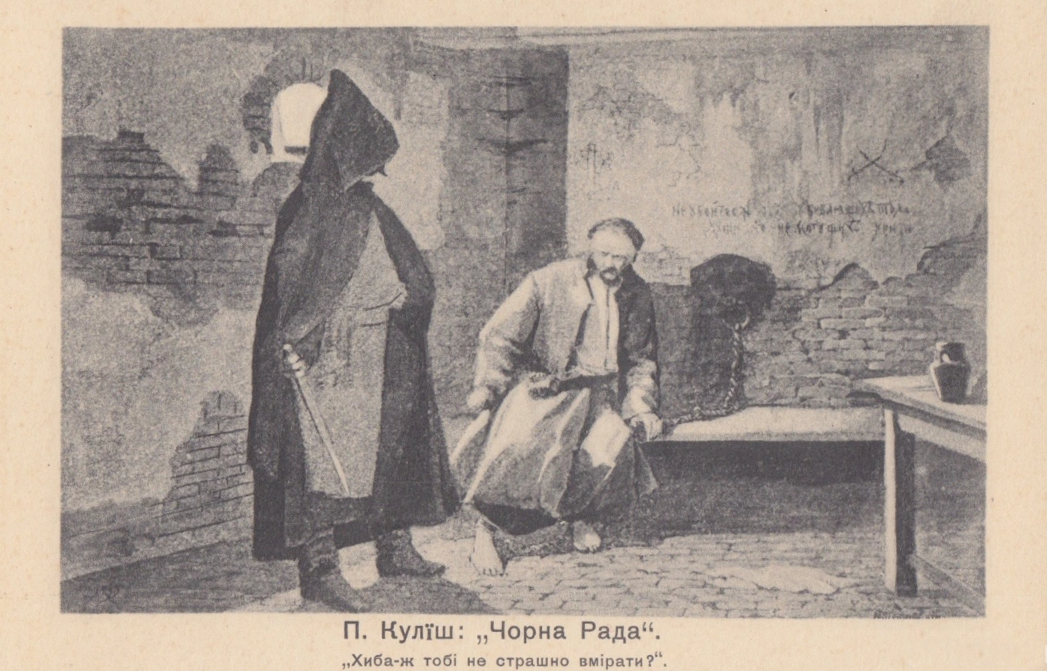
Tur visiting Somko in imprisonment

Having lost hope to gain Somko's help by helping him defeat Briukhovetsky, the older Shram and Petro leave Nizhyn in order to protect Pavoloch from Teteria's threats. Meanwhile Tur, disguised as an executioner, approaches the deposed hetman in prison and offers to help him escape and reclaim the hetmanship, but Somko refuses, not wishing to spill more blood. Soon thereafter Somko and Zolotarenko get executed on Briukhovetsky's order. After arriving to Pavoloch, Shram meets Teteria and agrees to have himself decapitated in exchange for the rebellious town being spared. Having buried his father, Petro goes to Kyiv, but on the way decides to visit Khmaryshche. There he learns, that Lesia, whom Gvyntovka wanted to marry to Somko's renegade scribe now serving Briukhovetsky, had been kidnapped by Tur together with her parents and brought back to the family's homestead. After saving Lesia, Tur leaves for Montenegro, the native land of his Cossack companion, in order to fight the Turks. Petro remains to live in Cherevan's house, and in a few months he and Lesia get married.

== Legacy and reception ==
Black Council is widely recognized as foundational to the Ukrainian historical novel tradition and to the formation of a modern Ukrainian literary language. Writing in Canadian Slavonic Papers, Romana Bahrij Pikulyk sees the black council as "the symbol of chaos and anarchy", representing "not only the dissolution of society but the dissolution of self". Pikulyk contrasts it against the khutir, which represents personal happiness, life, peace and love. Shram, following the black council, is destroyed, while Petro is able to settle and live his life with Lesia in the khutir. Thus, Pikulyk argues, the main theme of the story is the conflict between "history and individual happiness" rather than "change and past".

In 2000, the novel was adapted as a nine-episode television series titled The Black Council, produced by the Dovzhenko Film Studios.
