= General Military Court =

General Military Court (Ukrainian: Генеральний Військовий Суд, romanized: Heneralnyi viiskovyi sud) was the supreme judiciary body of the Cossack Hetmanate. It served as a court of appeals for regimental and sotnia courts, and as a court of the first instance for members of the General Officer Staff and other people personally subject to the hetman.

== Structure and functions ==
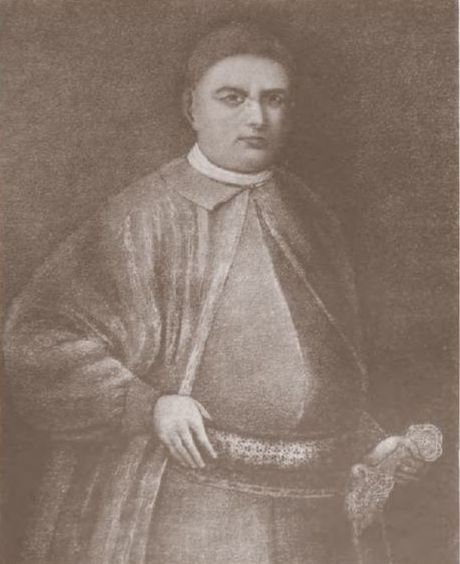
Portrait of general judge Andrii Bezborodko (1711–1780), father of Russian chancellor Alexander Bezborodko

The court was nominally presided by the hetman, but in practice its activities were usually supervised by one of the two general judges serving as the hetman's deputies. As a collegiate institution, the court included members of the General Officer Staff and Distinguished Military Fellows, but those were present only in special cases, with regular proceedings being normally attended by one judge along with a scribe. It was also responsible for proceedings on the issue of treason, oversaw the activities of local courts and controlled the execution of hetmans' universals and tsars' decrees. The court's decisions could only be appealed to the hetman, who was also responsible for personally approving the most important verdicts, including death sentences.

== History ==
General Military Court emerged in 1654 during the hetmanship of Bohdan Khmelnytsky. It was based on Cossack courts which existed under the Polish rule.

During the early 18th century the court became subject to the General Military Chancellery, but under the hetmanship of Danylo Apostol it was decoupled from that institution and transformed into an organ consisting of six members: three representatives of Cossack starshyna and three from the tsarist government. Under the rule of Kyrylo Rozumovsky, the court was headed by two general judges and included elected representatives of starshyna from each of the ten regiments. In 1764 the court was subordinated to the Collegium of Little Russia, and in 1767 was incorporated as one of its departments. The court was formally abolished in 1781, following the transformation of the Hetmanate into three viceroyalties; however, in reality it continued to function until 1790.

=== General Court of Little Russia ===
According to a 1796 decree by Paul I of Russia, functions of the General Military Court were taken over by the General Court of Little Russia (Ukrainian: Генеральний Малоросійський Суд), whose sphere of competence included the Little Russia Governorate in Left-bank Ukraine. The court had its seat in Chernihiv and started functioning in 1797. It consisted of civil and criminal departments and was staffed with two general judges and ten jury members elected for the term of 3 years by the Assembly of the Nobility. The court's decisions were implemented by the General Executor (Ukrainian: генеральний возний). The General Court of Little Russia ceased its activities in 1831 due to the centralization of judiciary in the Russian Empire.

== Sources ==
- Encyclopedia of Ukraine
- Yakovenko, Natalia (2006). An Outline History of Medieval and Early Modern Ukraine. Krytyka. ISBN 9667679829.
