= Alexander Bezborodko =

Russian statesman (1747–1799)

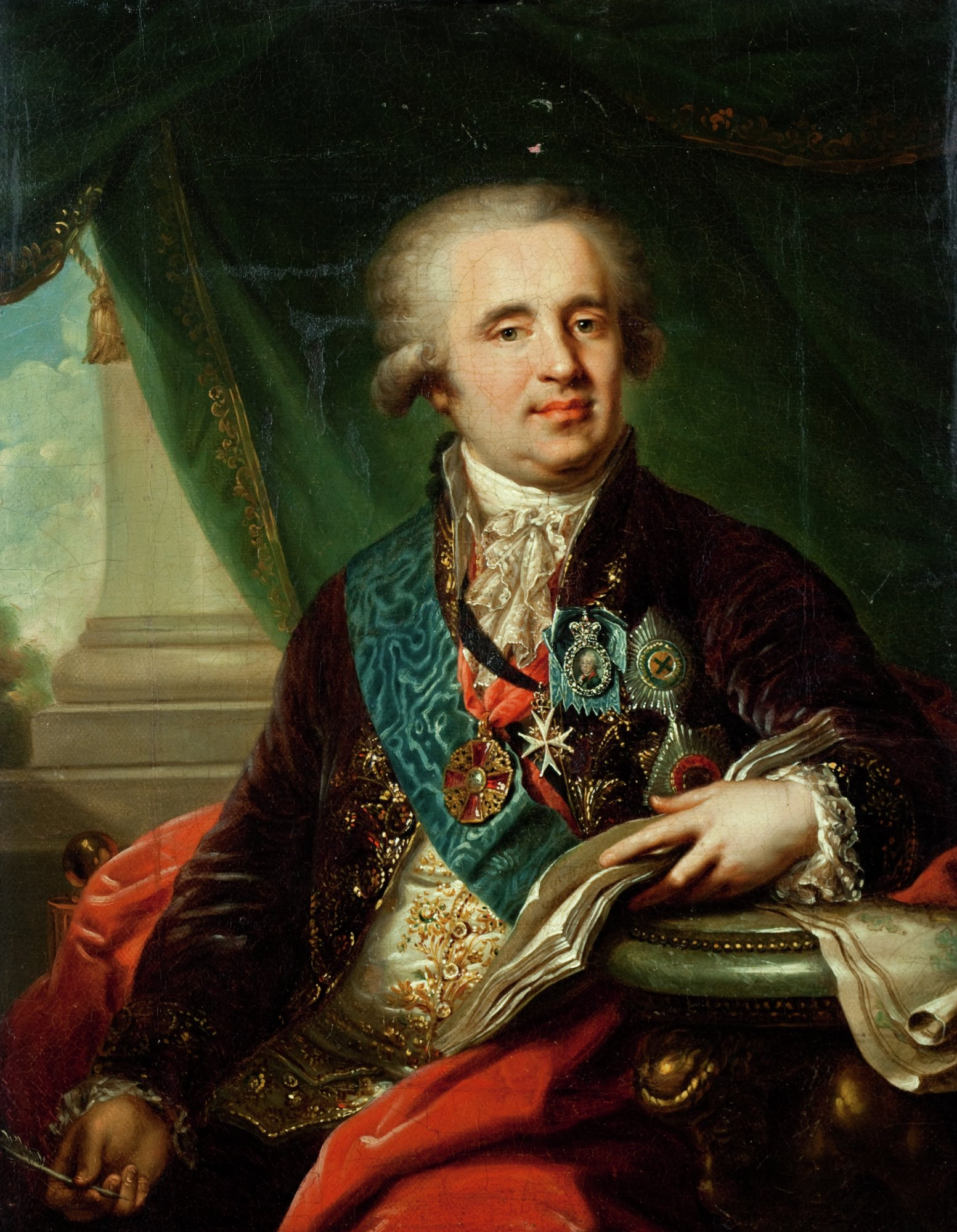
Portrait of Bezborodko by Johann Baptist von Lampi the Elder (c. 1800)

Prince Alexander Andreyevich Bezborodko (Note: Russian: Александр Андреевич Безбородко, Ukrainian: Олександр Андрійович Безбородько.) (25 March [O.S. 14 March] 1747 – 6 April 1799) was a Russian politician and diplomat who served as the chancellor of the Russian Empire from 1797 to 1799. He was the chief architect of Catherine the Great's foreign policy after the death of Nikita Panin.

== Early life ==
Аleksander Bezborodko was born in Glukhov, in the Cossack Hetmanate of the Russian Empire (now Hlukhiv, Ukraine), on 25 March [O.S. 14 March] 1747, into a family of Zaporozhian Cossack noble descent. His father, Andrey Bezborodko, was a general scribe (chancellor), while his mother, Eudokia, was a daughter of the general judge Mikhail Zabila.

He was educated at home and at Kiev-Mogila Academy. Upon finishing his education, he entered the public service as a clerk in the office of Peter Rumyantsev, then the governor-general of Little Russia, whom he accompanied to the Turkish War in 1768. He was present at the engagements of Larga and Kagul, and at the storming of Silistria. In 1774, Bezborodko was appointed colonel of the Kiev Regiment.

On the conclusion of the Treaty of Küçük Kaynarca in 1774, the field marshal recommended him to Catherine II, and she appointed him in 1775 her petition-secretary. He thus had the opportunity of impressing the empress with his brilliant gifts, the most remarkable of which were exquisite manners, a marvellous memory and a clear and pregnant style. At the same time he set to work to acquire the principal European languages, especially French, of which he became a master. It was at this time that he wrote his historical sketches of the Tatar wars and of Ukraine.

His activity was prodigious, and Catherine called him her factotum. In 1780, he accompanied her on her journey through Novorossiya, meeting the emperor Joseph II, who urged him to study diplomacy. On his return from a delicate mission to Copenhagen, he presented to the empress "a memorial on political affairs" which comprised the first plan of a partition of Turkey between Russia and Austria. This document was transmitted almost word for word to Vienna as the Russian proposals. He followed this up by Epitomised Historical Information concerning Moldavia. For these two state papers he was rewarded with the posts of "plenipotentiary for all negotiations " in the foreign office and postmaster-general.

== Career under Catherine II ==
From this time he was inseparably associated with Catherine in all important diplomatic affairs, though officially he was the subordinate of the vice-chancellor, Count Ivan Osterman. He wrote all the most important despatches to the Russian ministers abroad, concluded and subscribed all treaties, and performed all the functions of a secretary of state. He identified himself entirely with Catherine's political ideas, even with that of re-establishing the Greek empire under her grandson Constantine. The empress, as usual, richly rewarded her comes with pensions and principalities. In 1786, he was promoted to the Governing Senate, and it was through him that the empress communicated her will to that august state-decoration. In 1787, he accompanied Catherine on her triumphal progress through South Russia in the capacity of minister of foreign affairs. At Kanev, he conducted the negotiations with the Polish king, Stanislaus II, and at Novaya Kaidaniya he was in the empress's carriage when she received Joseph II.

The second Turkish War (1787–1792) and the Swedish war with Gustavus III (1788–1790) heaped fresh burdens on his already heavily laden shoulders, and he suffered from the intrigues of his numerous jealous rivals, including the empress's latest favorite, A. M. Mamonov. All his efforts were directed towards the conclusion of the two oppressive wars by an honorable peace. The pause of Verela with Gustavus III (14 August 1790) was on the terms dictated by him. On the sudden death of Potemkin, he was despatched to Jassy to prevent the peace congress there from breaking up, and succeeded, in the face of all but insuperable difficulties, in concluding a treaty exceedingly advantageous to Russia (9 January 1792). For this service he received the thanks of the empress, the ribbon of St. Andrew, and 50,000 rubles.

However, on his return from Jassy, he found his confidential post of secretary of petitions occupied by the empress's last favorite, Platon Zubov. He complained of this "diminution of his dignity" to the empress in a private memorial in the course of 1793. The empress reassured him by fresh honors and distinctions on the occasion of the solemn celebration of the peace of Jassy (2 September 1793), when she publicly presented him with a golden olive-branch encrusted with brilliants. Subsequently, Catherine reconciled him with Zubov, and he resumed the conduct of foreign affairs. He contributed more than any other man to bring about the downfall and the third partition of Poland, for which he was magnificently recompensed.

== Grand Chancellor of the Russian Empire ==
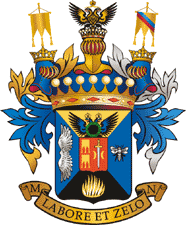
Bezborodko Coat of Arms awarded in 1798

But diplomacy by no means exhausted Bezborodko's capacity for work. He had a large share in the internal administration also. He reformed the post-office, improved the banking system of Russia, regulated the finances, constructed roads, and united the Uniate and Orthodox churches. On the death of Catherine, Emperor Paul entrusted Bezborodko with the examination of the late empress's private papers, and shortly afterwards made him a prince of the Russian Empire, with a correspondingly splendid apanage. On the retirement of Osterman he received the highest dignity in the Russian Empire – that of imperial chancellor. Thanks to his influence on Paul, Bezborodko was able to convince him to restore the Chief Military Court of the Hetmanate, which had been dissolved under Catherine II.

Bezborodko was the only Russian minister who retained the favor of Paul to the last. During the last two years of his life, control of Russia's diplomacy was entirely in his hands. His programme at this period was peace with all the European powers, revolutionary France included. But the emperor's growing aversion to this pacific policy induced the astute old minister to attempt to "seek safety in moral and physical repose." Paul, however, refused to accept his resignation and would have sent him abroad for the benefit of his health, had not a sudden stroke of paralysis prevented Bezborodko from taking advantage of his master's kindness.

He died in Saint Petersburg on 6 April 1799.

== Personal qualities ==
In his private life, Bezborodko spent his fortune on banquets and collections of pictures and statues. He provided financial support to his relatives and to authors. While described as seeking favor, he was also noted for being grateful and for his patriotism and abilities.

== Literary activities ==
The 1777 Short Chronicle of Little Russia was co-authored by Bezborodko together with Vasily Ruban. Bezborodko has also been proposed as a hypothetical author of the History of the Ruthenians.

== Residences ==
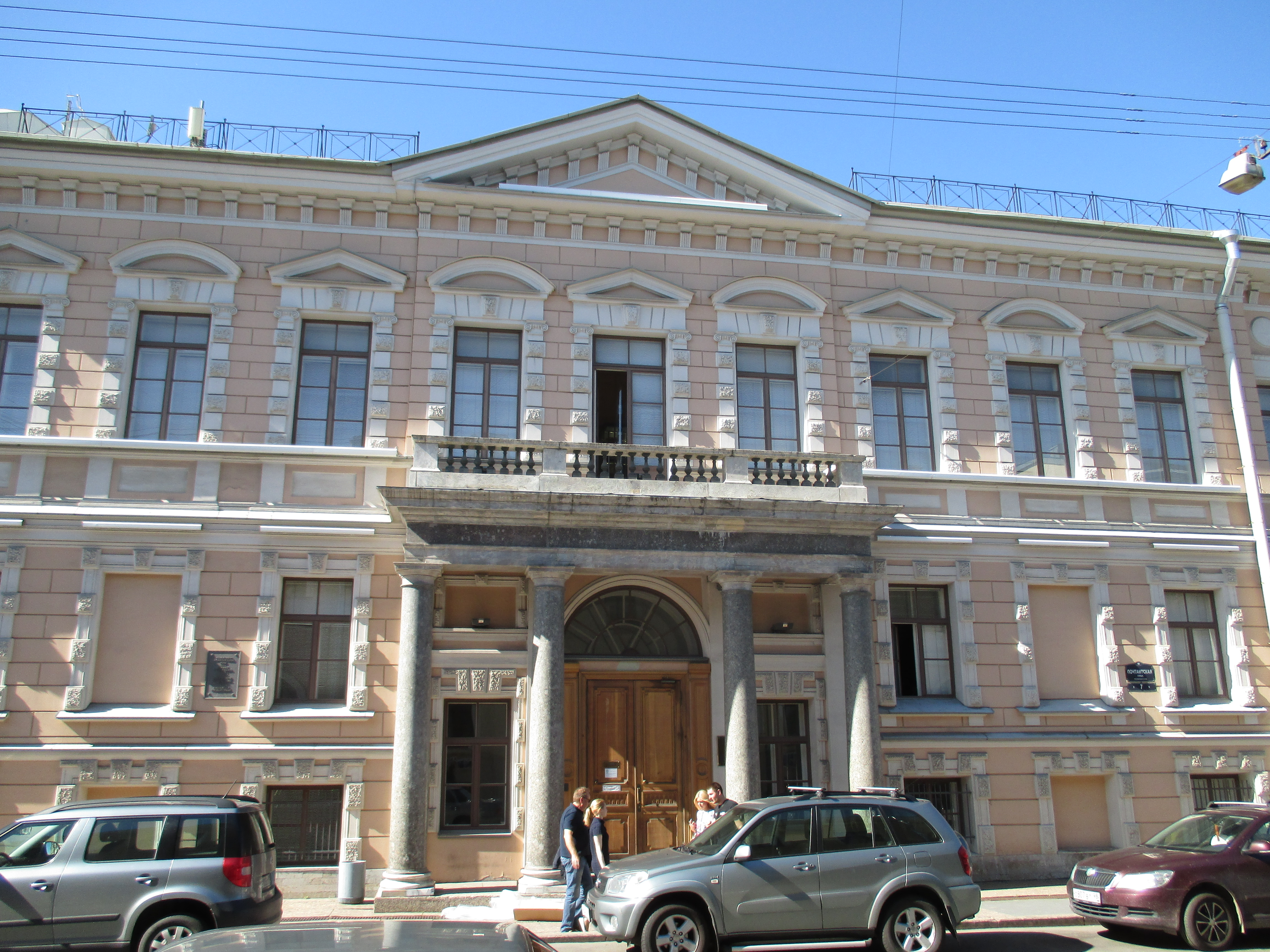
Bezborodko Palace, southern façade (Pochtamskaya ulitsa), four granite columns that remained from the original Quarenghi design.

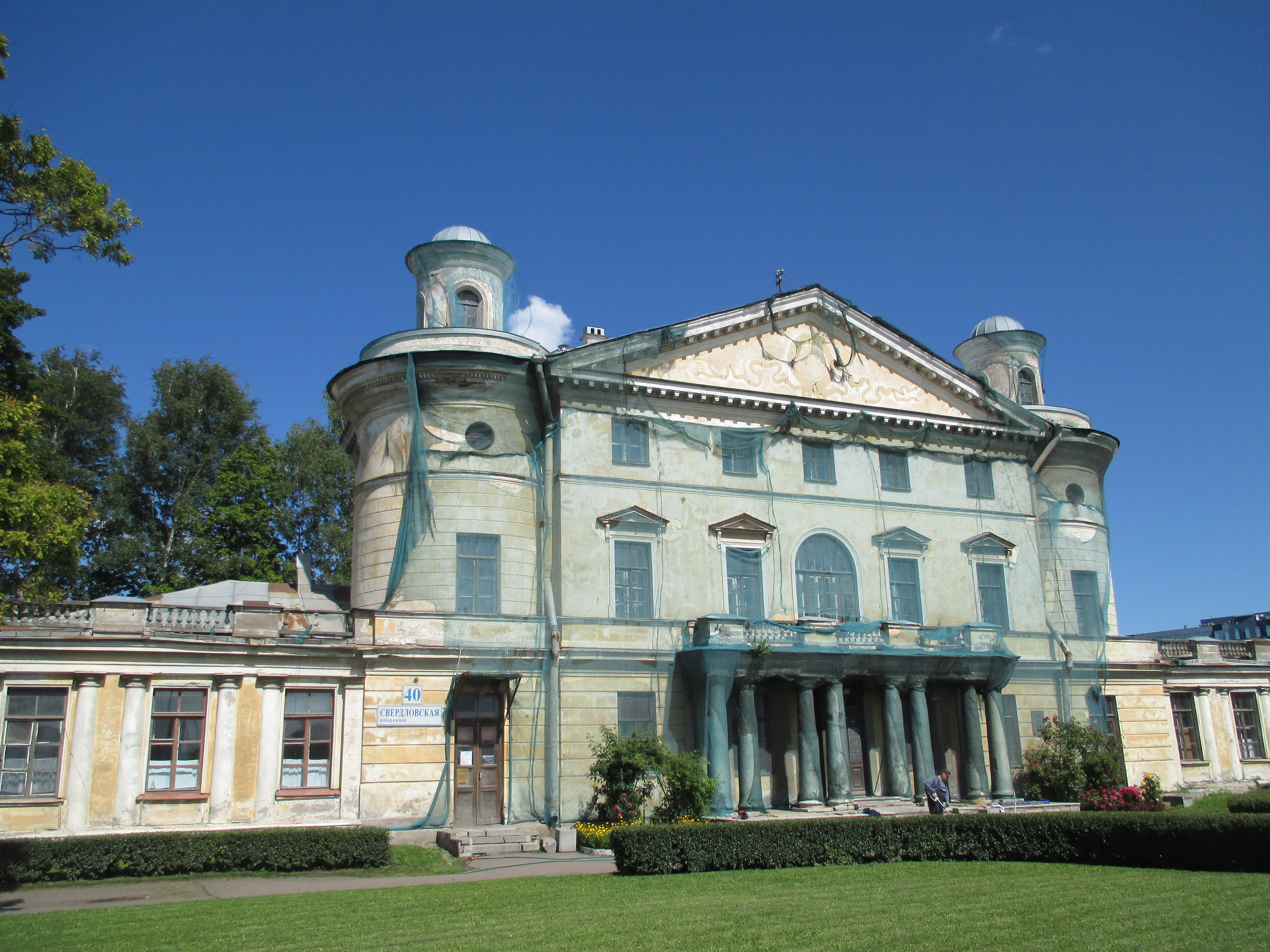
Bezborodko Dacha, central building

=== Bezborodko Palace in Saint Petersburg ===
The Bezborodko Palace is located at Pochtamtsky Pereulok in Saint Petersburg.

The palace was built in 1783–1795 to a design by Giacomo Quarenghi. There emerged a palace designed according to the principles of Russian Classicism. While the façade of the mansion looked fairly modest, its interiors were notable for their resplendence. The interior decoration has partly survived till today. The façade however has changed much since its erection. Only a portico of four granite columns survived from the original façade. After the count's death his heirs sold the palace to the Post-Office Department that adapted the building to its needs. In 1924 the building was given into the possession of the Museum of communications. During the siege it suffered badly from artillery bombardments and was closed for repair. The museum partly resumed its display only in 1950. In 1974 owing to a drastic state of the entire structure its major repair was started and the museum has returned to the building only thirty years later, in 2003.

=== Bezborodko Dacha in Saint Petersburg ===
The dacha is located at Sverdlovskaya Naberezhnaya in Saint Petersburg.

The dacha was built in 1783–1784 to a design by Giacomo Quarenghi. It is a central three-storey building with round turrets in the corners, joined with arched galleries to two symmetrical side wings. In the first half of the 19th century the side wings were linked by a chain railing held in the mouths of twenty-nine cast-iron lions. There used to be a large landscape park with pavilions.

== Legacy ==
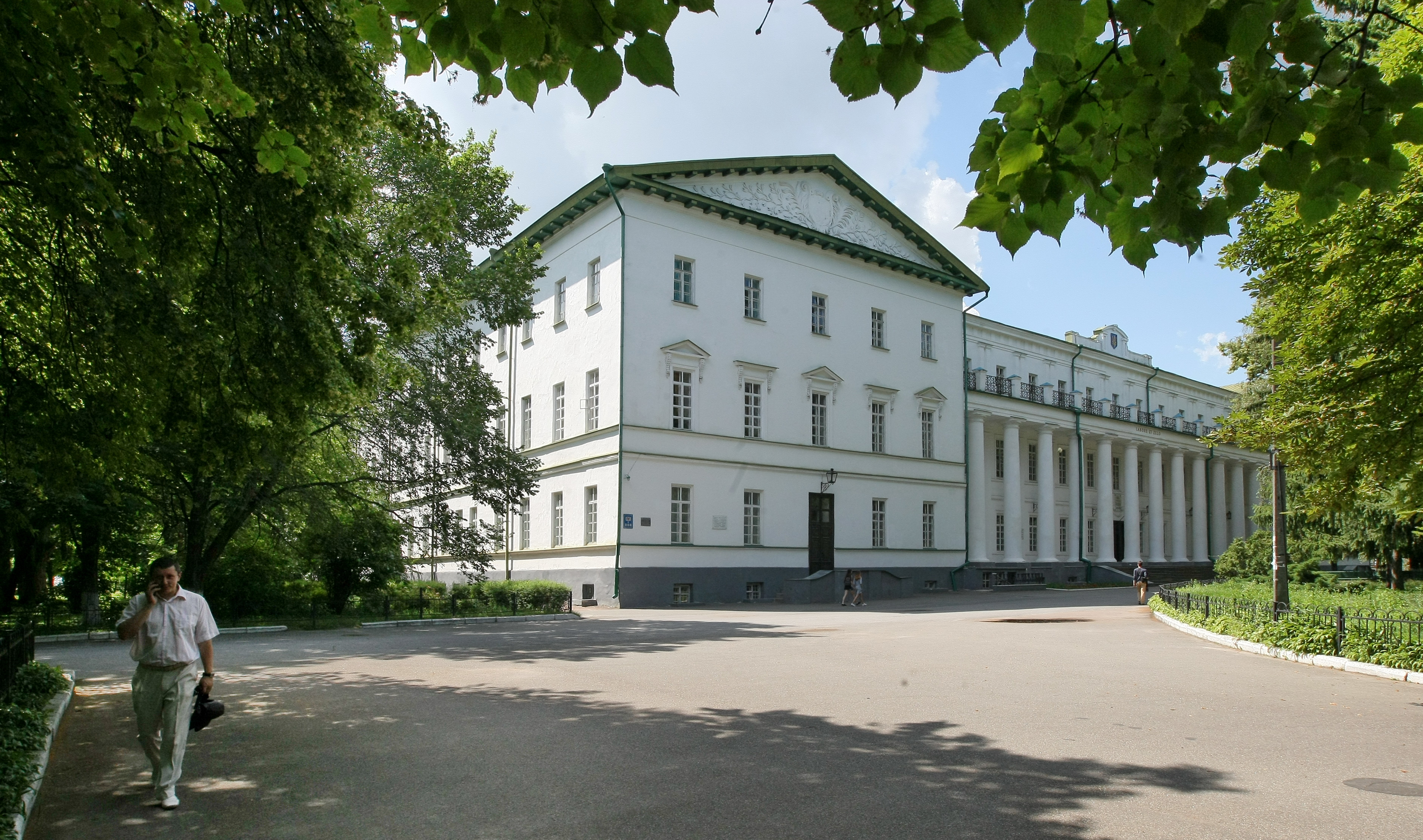
Nizhyn Lyceum founded according to Bezborodko's testament

According to his will, Bezborodko donated 210,000 roubles for the establishment of a gymnasium, which was founded by his brother Illya, a veteran of the Russo-Turkish War, in Nizhyn. Starting from 1820, the higher school, which received the prince's name, offered a 9-year course and was equal in status to Russian universities. In 1832 it was reorganized as a lyceum, specializing in physics and mathematics, and after 1840 in law. After 1875 the school became known as a historical-philological institute, and in 1922 it was reorganized as an institute for people's education. Since 1939 the institution has been known as Nizhyn Gogol State University. Among notable professors who taught at the establishment were Nikolai Bunge and Pylyp Morachevskyi, and its alumni included Nikolai Gogol, Yevhen Hrebinka, Leonid Hlibov and several other notable figures.

== Sources ==
- "Безбородко" . Brockhaus and Efron Encyclopedic Dictionary (in Russian). 1906.

Preceded by Ivan Andreyevich Osterman	Imperial Chancellor of Russia; 1797 — 1799	Succeeded by Nikita Petrovich Panin (acting)
