= Oleksandr Fedoruk (scholar) =

Ukrainian literary critic and textologist

- Олександр Федорук
- Born: 27 December 1966 (age 59); Ternopil, Ukrainian SSR, Soviet Union
- Spouse: Olena Kis-Fedoruk
- Children: 2

Academic background
- Education: Ivan Franko National University of Lviv
- Thesis: Panteleimon Kulish and the Literary Process in Western Ukraine from the 1860s to the Early 1870s (2001)

Academic work
- Discipline: Literary criticism, textual criticism
- Institutions: National Academy of Sciences of Ukraine (1999–present); Harvard University (2013); Monash University (2013)
- Main interests: Panteleimon Kulish, Taras Shevchenko
- Notable works: Kulish's Novel Chorna Rada: A History of the Text (2019)

Oleksandr "Oles" Oleksandrovych Fedoruk (Ukrainian: Олександр (Олесь) Олександрович Федорчук; born 27 December 1966) is a Ukrainian literary critic and textologist. He holds the degree of Doctor of Philological Sciences (2021) and serves as head of the Department of Manuscript Collections and Textology at the Taras Shevchenko Institute of Literature of the National Academy of Sciences of Ukraine. He also heads the Centre for the Study of the Life and Work of Panteleimon Kulish at the same institute, and was concurrently a senior research fellow at the Institute of Encyclopaedic Research of the National Academy of Sciences of Ukraine from 2006 to 2009.

== Life and career ==
Fedoruk was born on 27 December 1966 in Ternopil into the family of the art historian and academician Oleksandr Kasyanovych Fedoruk and the choral conductor Mariia Fedoruk (née Semaniv).

He graduated from the Faculty of Philology of the Ivan Franko National University of Lviv in 1997, and completed the postgraduate programme of the Lviv branch of the Taras Shevchenko Institute of Literature of the National Academy of Sciences of Ukraine in 2000. His candidate dissertation, Panteleimon Kulish and the Literary Process in Western Ukraine from the 1860s to the Early 1870s, was defended in 2001 in the speciality 10.01.01 (Ukrainian literature). His doctoral dissertation, Kulish's Novel The Black Council: A History of the Text, was defended on 13 May 2021 at the specialised academic council of the Taras Shevchenko Institute of Literature. He held a research fellowship at Harvard University in 2013, and in the same year served as a junior research fellow at Monash University in Melbourne, Australia.

From 1999 to 2005 Fedoruk was a junior, then senior, research fellow at the Lviv branch of the Taras Shevchenko Institute of Literature. Since 2005 he has worked at the institute's headquarters in Kyiv, in the Department of Manuscript Collections and Textology. Since 2018 he has headed the Centre for the Study of the Life and Work of Panteleimon Kulish, established at the institute to coordinate scholarship on Kulish in Ukraine and abroad.

In 2022, after the start of the full-scale war with Russia, Fedoruk volunteered for the Armed Forces of Ukraine and served in the 23rd Separate Rifle Battalion, holding the rank of senior lieutenant. In an interview with the state news agency Ukrinform, he explained his decision in characteristically blunt terms, saying that he would have lost his self-respect if he had not gone to the recruitment office. A profile published in the journal Svit described him as a "scholar and warrior", noting his return to academic work while continuing to support comrades still serving at the front. Fedoruk received the status of combat veteran and was demobilised in November 2023.

On 3 March 2024 he was appointed head of the Department of Manuscript Collections and Textology at the Institute of Literature. In a 2025 article for the bulletin of the Shevchenko Scientific Society in America, titled "War and Archives: The Institute of Literature", he discussed the importance of preserving Ukraine's archival heritage during wartime and described ongoing cooperation with NTSh-A.

Fedoruk is married to the art historian and poet Olena Kis-Fedoruk, a research fellow at the Borys Voznytsky Lviv National Art Gallery. The couple have two sons.

== Public activity ==
Fedoruk serves on the editorial boards of several Ukrainian scholarly publications:

- the "Open Archive" series of the Krytyka publishing house (since 2003);
- the Complete Works of Panteleimon Kulish, of which he is also executive secretary, a project jointly prepared by Krytyka and the Taras Shevchenko Institute of Literature (since 2005);
- the cultural-studies almanac Khronika-2000 (2009–2014);
- the "Ad fontes" series of the Ukrainian Writer publishing house (2011–2014);
- the Notes of the Shevchenko Scientific Society in America, New Series (since 2017);
- the journal Slovo i Chas.

== Research interests ==
Fedoruk's scholarly fields are Shevchenko studies, Kulish studies, the history of nineteenth-century Ukrainian literature, and textology. The core of his research is the life and work of Panteleimon Kulish and Taras Shevchenko, together with the source studies and textology of nineteenth-century Ukrainian literature. Writing for Radio Liberty in 2019, he published a widely read essay on Kulish's Black Council that drew together the principal findings of his then-forthcoming monograph.

Fedoruk is the author of around 200 scholarly works, including monographs, articles, reviews, bibliographies, polemical pieces, prefaces, and afterwords, and has compiled or served as scholarly editor of a number of editions. He prepared and annotated the first two volumes of Kulish's letters for the Complete Works of P. Kulish (Krytyka, 2005 and 2009), editions which received high marks from specialists and have been received as exemplary academic editions of a Ukrainian classic. Together with H. Hrabovych he initiated the first facsimile edition of the first edition of Shevchenko's Haidamaky. He wrote the accompanying study The First Edition of Shevchenko's Haidamaky: A History of the Book (Kyiv, 2013), which reviewed and synthesised the printed and archival sources connected with the writing, publication, and dissemination of the poem.

== Principal works ==
- Bukvar yuzhnorusskiy [The South-Russian Primer] by T. Shevchenko: Historiography, the Problem of Reception, the Genesis of the Idea // Ukraine in the Past. Kyiv; Lviv, 1994. Issue VI. P. 94–108.
- Epihramy Butymbasa [Epigrams of Butymbas] [M. Butovych] / Compiled, with introd., comm. Kyiv: M. P. Kots Publishers, 1995. 223 p. (Series: Returned Names).
- Kulish P. Letters to M. D. Belozersky / Compiled, with introd., comm. Lviv; New York: M. P. Kots, 1997. 223 p. (Series: Literary Monuments; Issue 3).
- On the History of the First Publication of Taras Shevchenko's Poem Velykyi Lokh // Kyivska Starovyna. 1999. No. 2. P. 112–121.
- On the Characteristics of P. Kulish's Connections with A. Metlynsky (Two Letters from Metlynsky to Kulish) // Panteleimon Kulish: Materials and Studies. Lviv; New York: M. P. Kots, 2000. P. 247–276.
- The Unfinished Letter and Memoir of P. Kulish about I. Nechui-Levytsky // Panteleimon Kulish: Materials and Studies. Lviv; New York, 2000. P. 276–297.
- Half a Century Later: Literary Reminiscences by P. Kulish / Compiled with text, introd., comm. by O. Fedoruk and B. Nakhlik. P. 105–156.
- On the History of the Formation of Shevchenko's Cult in Galicia from the 1860s to the Late Nineteenth Century // Kyivska Starovyna. 2001. No. 4. P. 56–68.
- A New Word about Vasyl Mova (Lymansky) // Notes of the Shevchenko Scientific Society. Vol. CCXLVI: Proceedings of the Philological Section. Lviv, 2003. P. 476–487.
- Ukrainian-Polish Relations in the Reception of Panteleimon Kulish // Ukraina Moderna. 2003. Part 8. P. 73–106.
- Barvinskyi O. Memoirs of My Life / Compiled by A. Shatska and O. Fedoruk. New York; Kyiv: Smoloskyp, 2004. Parts I and II. 526 p. ISBN 0-916381-18-1.
- Kulish as Editor of Pravda // Molodi natsii: Almanachs. Kyiv: Smoloskyp, 2004. No. 1 (30). P. 14–43.
- Panteleimon Kulish: A Bibliography of Literature (1989–2002) // Open Archive: An Annual of Materials and Studies on the History of Modern Ukrainian Culture. Kyiv, 2004. Vol. I. P. 453–573.
- Kulish P., Complete Works. Letters / Compiled, with introd., comm. by O. Fedoruk and N. Khokhlova. Kyiv: Krytyka, 2005. Vol. I: 1841–1850. 648 p. ISBN 978-966-7679-70-5.
- Modern Ukrainian Studies in the Kuban: An Annotated Review of Publications // Pamiatky Ukrainy. 2005 (January 2006). No. 3/4. P. 202–221.
- Kulish and his Circle: A Worksheet / Institute of Encyclopaedic Studies of the National Academy of Sciences of Ukraine. Kyiv, 2007. 74 p.
- Notes about the Autographs of Shevchenko // Slovo i chas. 2007. No. 3. P. 28–29.
- On the Editing of the Memoirs of Mykola Storozhenko // Ukraina Moderna. 2007. Part 12 (1). P. 218–228.
- On Kulish's "Foreign Notes Tales of the Ukrainian People" // Ukrainian Archaeographic Annual, New Series. Vol. 12 (May 2008). P. 838–839.
- On the Shevchenkana of the Bibliography of 1861 // Slovo i chas. 2008. No. 5. P. 52–56.
- Kulish P., Complete Works. Letters / Compiled, comm. by Oles Fedoruk; ed. V. Dudko. Kyiv: Krytyka, 2009. Vol. II: 1850–1856. 672 p.
- Panteleimon Kulish: Writer, Philosopher, Citizen / Scholarly consultant and compiler of illustrative material O. Fedoruk. Kyiv, 2009. 536 p. (Khronika-2000. Issue 78).
- Kulish and Zabila: Toward a History of Personal Connections within Literary Relations // Khronika 2000. Kyiv, 2009. Issue 78. P. 411–430.
- Mikhal Hrabovsky on the Drawings of Kulish // Obrazotvorche Mystetstvo (Visual Arts). 2009. No. 2. P. 14–17; also in Visnyk NTSh. 2009. No. 42. P. 30–32.
- On the Genealogy of Kulish / I. Sytyi and O. Fedoruk // Ukrainian Archaeographic Annual, New Series. Kyiv, 2010. Issue 15/16. P. 129–139.
- Foreign Shevchenko Studies (from the Materials of UVAN) / Scholarly consultants and compilers of illustrative material O. Fedoruk and T. Skrypka. Kyiv, 2010. Part 1: 353 p.; Part 2: 447 p. (Khronika-2000. Issues 3 (85); 4 (86)).
- Shevchenko Studies in the Ukrainian Free Academy of Sciences (1940s to 1960s) // Foreign Shevchenko Studies (from the Materials of UVAN). Kyiv, 2010. Part 1. P. 326–353.
- Volodymyr Makarovych Yatsiuk (13 July 1946 to 2 May 2012) // Ukrainian Archaeographic Annual, New Series. Kyiv, 2012. P. 761–765.
- The First Edition of Shevchenko's Haidamaky: A History of the Book. Kyiv, 2013. 152 p.
- Kulish's Novel Chorna Rada: A History of the Text. Kyiv, 2019. VI, 590 p. ISBN 978-966-2789-14-0.

== Literature ==
- Barka V. Renewed Genres // Suchasnist. 1997. No. 6. P. 151–154.
- Serdyuchenko V. Russian Letters of Panteleimon Kulish // Voprosy literatury. 1999. No. 6. November–December. P. 346–355.
- Horsky V. A Reissue for the Kievan Intelligentsia // Gazeta po-kievski. 2006. No. 1. 21 January. P. 3.
- Hyrych I. Review of Kulish P., Complete Works. Letters. Vol. I // Ukrainian Archaeographic Annual, New Series. Kyiv, 2006. Issue 10/11. P. 803–805.
- Wilczyński W. Review of Kulish P., Complete Works. Letters. Vol. I // Slavia orientalis. 2007. Vol. LVI. No. 2. P. 303–306.
- Boron O. His Last Path Has Become Symbolic // Uriadovyi Kurier. 2011. 21 May.
- The Thirtieth Anniversary Shevchenko Studies Conference at NTSh-A // Svoboda. 2012. 13 April.
- Nikolaichuk I. "Don't Look for Clear Formulas in Shevchenko: There Are None" // Uriadovyi Kurier. 2013. 27 July.
- Boron O. Why Did Honta Kill His Sons? // Uriadovyi Kurier. 2013. 22 July.
- Samoilenko H. An Important Textological Study // Literature and Culture of Polissia. 2021. Issue 102. Series "Philological Sciences". No. 17.
