= Black Council =

Type of council of the Ukrainian Cossacks

In the history of Ukraine, the Black Council (Ukrainian: Чорна рада, romanized: Chorna rada) was a council (rada) of Ukrainian Cossacks in which participated a large number of ordinary Cossacks, as well as local commoners (usually a Cossack rada was convened among the Cossack starshyna). The name comes from the Ukrainian word чернь (chern, "blacks"), a demeaning term for rank-and-file Cossacks and lowly folk in general, "plebs". The most famous of these was the Black Council of 1663.

Usually Black Rada signified drastic changes among the starshyna.
