= Ivan Osterman =

Russian statesman (1725–1811)

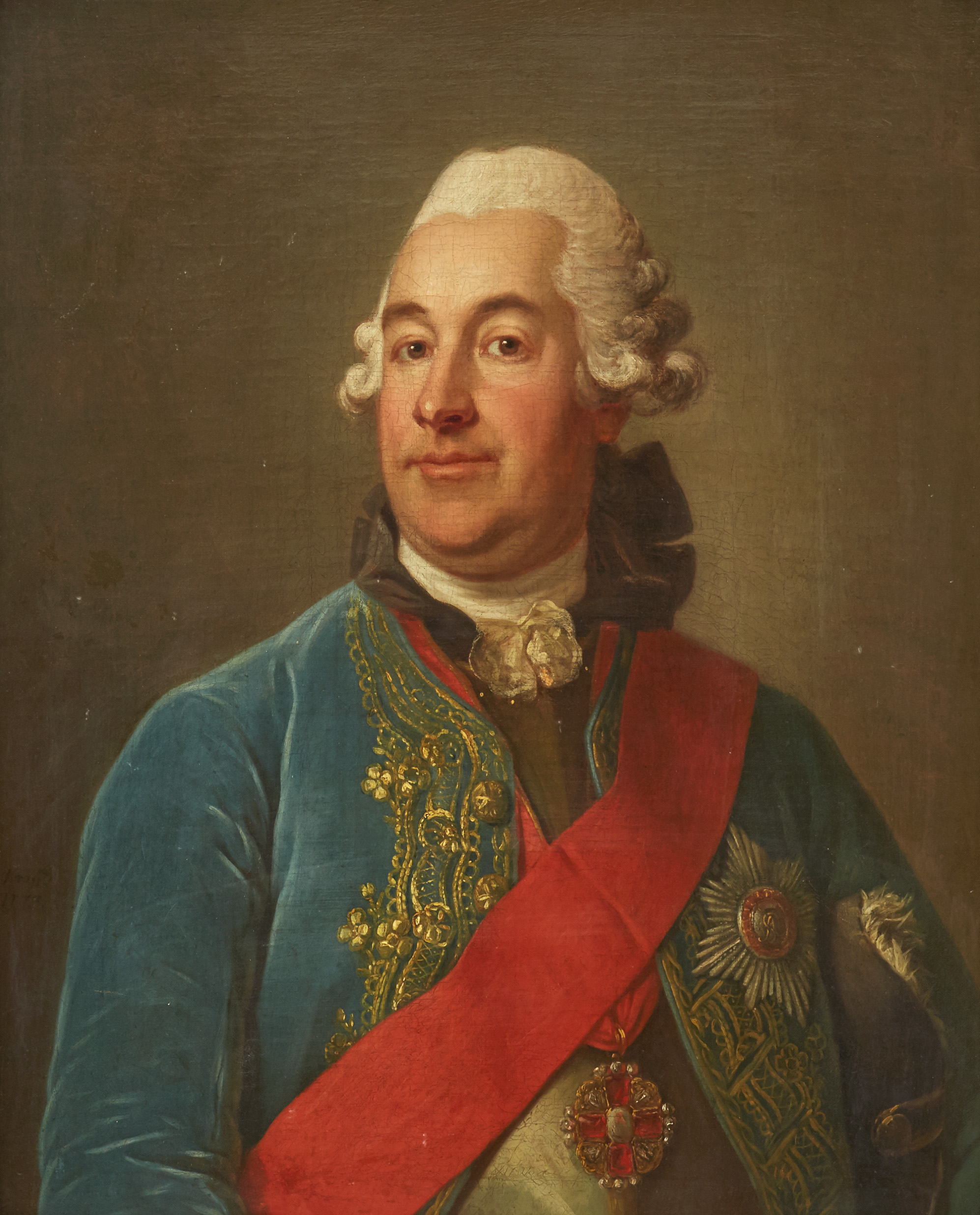
Portrait by Per Krafft the Elder, 1773

Count Ivan Andreyevich Osterman (Russian: Иван Андреевич Остерман; 1725–1811) was a Russian statesman and the son of Andrei Osterman.

After Osterman's father fell into disgrace, Ivan Osterman was transferred from the Imperial Guards to the regular army and then sent abroad, where he continued his education. In 1757, Osterman was in the Russian service again. He held diplomatic posts in Paris and Stockholm, where he would exercise considerable influence on Gustav III of Sweden. In 1774, Osterman was appointed a member of the Governing Senate.

In 1783, Osterman was appointed Minister of foreign affairs of Imperial Russia, but would play only a secondary role in this post. His closest associates - Count Bezborodko, Prince Zubov, Fyodor Rostopchin - were the ones with real power, but they lacked the fluency in languages and oleaginous manner of address which Osterman was famed for.

In 1796, Osterman was appointed the Chancellor of the Russian Empire, again as a puppet of real policy-makers. A year later, the new Emperor Paul dismissed him from office. Ivan Osterman spent the last years of his life in Moscow. As he had no children of his own, his title and last name were inherited by a nephew, the celebrated General Tolstoy.

== Sources ==
- "Остерман, Иван Андреевич" . Brockhaus and Efron Encyclopedic Dictionary (in Russian). 1906.

Preceded by Nikita Ivanovich Panin	Imperial Chancellor of Russia; 1796 — 1797	Succeeded by Alexander Andreyevich Bezborodko
