= Black Council of 1663 =

Cossack Rada meeting in Ukraine

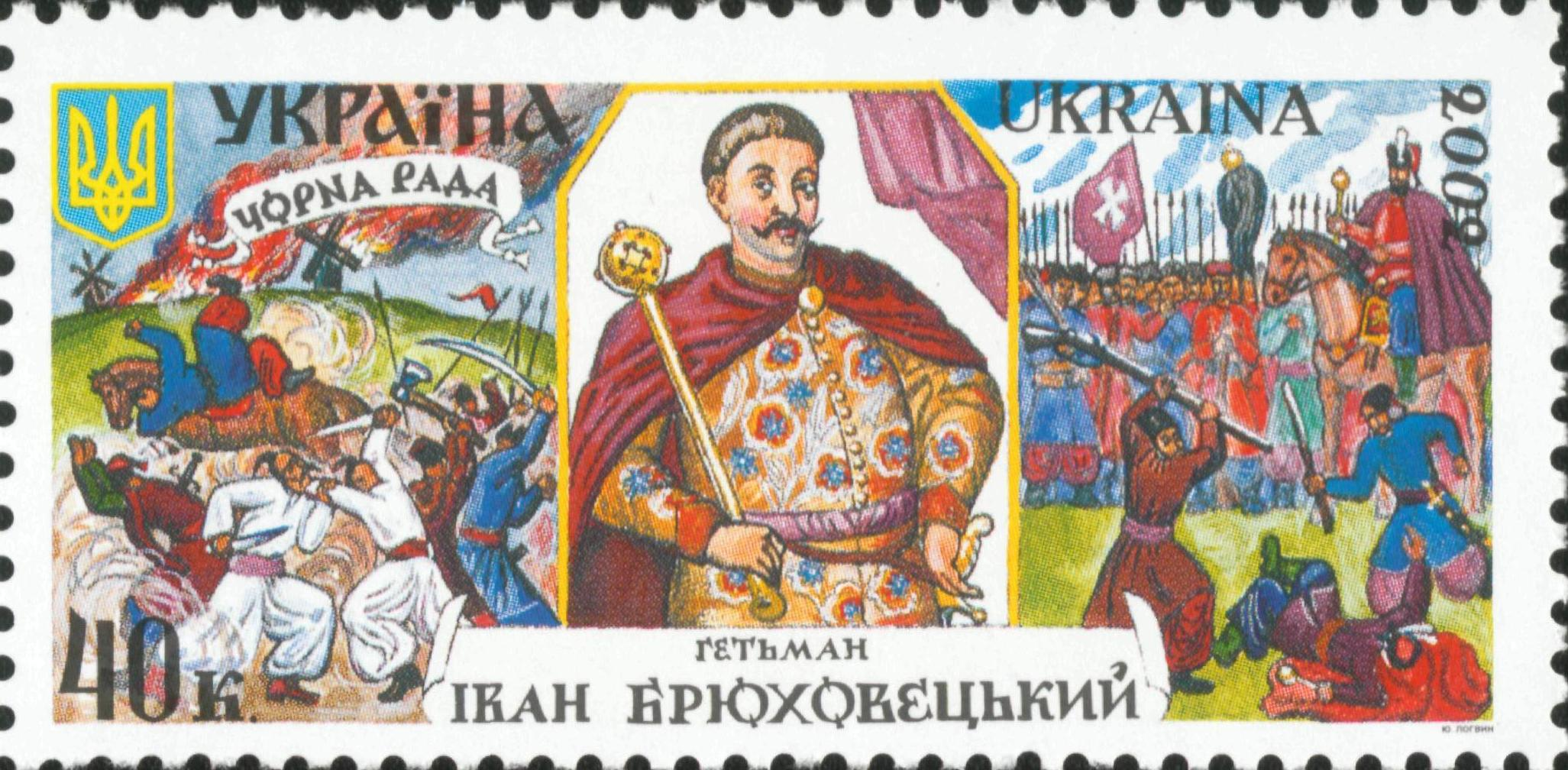
Ukrainian postage stamp depicting the Black Council of 1663, Ivan Briukhovetsky and his 1668 execution.

The Black Council of 1663 (Ukrainian: Чорна рада, romanized: chorna rada) was a Cossack Rada meeting on 17–18 June 1663 near Nizhyn, Ukraine, where thousands of common Cossacks, Zaporozhians, Ukrainian peasants and Cossack starshyna assembled to elect a new hetman of left-bank Ukraine. The main candidates were acting hetman Yakym Somko, Nizhyn colonel Vasyl Zolotarenko, and the kish otaman, Ivan Briukhovetsky.

The starshyna proposed and supported Yakym Somko who was planning to reduce Muscovite influence in left-bank Ukraine, and restore Ukraine on both sides on the Dnieper River, and Zolotarenko chose to support his opponent Somko as well. But the common Cossacks proposed Briukhovetsky, who promised to lower taxes. The tsar also supported Briukhovetsky's candidacy hoping to use him to increase Muscovite influence in the left-bank.

The majority opted to elect Briukhovetsky who admired his proposed policies and elected him the new hetman. As disputes grew over the elections, the situation worsened for Somko and Zolotarenko and both sought protection from the Russian officials who were present as spectators. But the officers arrested them both and handed them over to the newly elected hetman. Briukhovetsky had them imprisoned, and executed in Borzna on September 28, 1663.

== See also ==
- Black council (definition)
- Black Council, a novel by Panteleimon Kulish dedicated to the event
- The Ruin (Ukrainian history)
