= Kochubey =

Kochubey (Ukrainian: Кочубей) is a Ukrainian surname of Crimean Tatar descent. Notable people with the surname include:

- Vasyl Kochubey (1640–1708), Ukrainian nobleman
- Viktor Kochubey (1768–1834), Russian statesman of Ukrainian descent
