= Collegium of Little Russia =

Collegium of Little Russia was a Russian colonial administration in Ukraine that existed in 1722–1727 and 1764–1786.

- Collegium of Little Russia (1722–1727) headed by Stepan Veliaminov
- Collegium of Little Russia (1764–1786) headed by Pyotr Rumiantsev

== See also ==
- Little Russian Office
