= Sotnik =

Russian, Ukrainian, and Cossack military rank

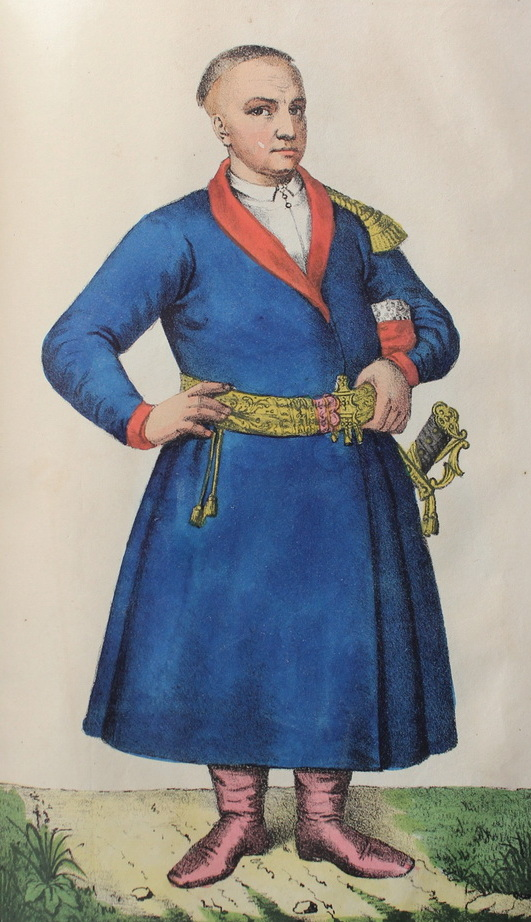
Sotnyk of Ukrainian Cossacks

Sotnik or sotnyk (Russian: сотник; Ukrainian: сотник; Bulgarian: стотник) was a military rank among the Cossack starshyna (military officers), the Russian streltsy and Cossack host, the Ukrainian Insurgent Army, the Ukrainian Galician Army, and the Ukrainian People's Army.

== Administrative rank ==
Holders of the rank also served as leaders of territorial units. In the Cossacks' paramilitary society of the Zaporozhian Host, Cossack Hetmanate, and Sloboda Ukraine, territories were organized along the lines of military organization and commanded by officers. During the Khmelnytsky Uprising and in the Cossack Hetmanate (17th-18th centuries), sotnyks were leaders of territorial administrative subdivisions called sotnyas. Such sotnyks were subordinated to polkovnyks (colonel) who were in control of a polk (primary administrative division) and a regiment (military unit).

== Military ranks ==
The word sotnik literally means commander of a hundred men in most Slavonic languages, much like how the Latin term Centurion reflected a commander of a similar number of troops in the Roman Empire. In the Russian rank-structure the military role of a sotnik developed into that of a poruchik (Russian: поручик), eventually known as "lieutenant" (Russian: лейтенант, romanized: leytenant). Ukrainian military formations retained the rank of sotnyk (Ukrainian: сотник) well into the 20th century as the equivalent of an army captain. The rank did not officially change, but rather fell out of use after the Soviet Army and intelligence services suppressed the Ukrainian Insurgent Army in the late 1940s and 1950s.

Some translations render the word sotnik as "Captain", however the "Lieutenant" interpretation also appears in common usage, and for the sake of historical and social clarity the original rank-name is used.

=== Slovenia ===
The rank is still used by the Slovenian Armed Forces, and is equal to the rank of captain in other armed forces.

== Legacy ==
The name of "Sotnik" has been adopted as a surname.

- Olena Sotnyk
