= Yesaul =

Rank in cossack armies

Yesaul, osaul or osavul (Russian: есау́л, romanized: yesaul, Ukrainian: осаву́л, romanized: osavul) (from Turkic yasaul - chief), was a post and a rank in the Russian and Ukrainian Cossack units.

The first records of the rank imply that it was introduced by Stefan Batory, King of Poland in 1576.

== Cossacks in Russia ==
There were different yesaul posts and ranks in Cossack Hosts in Imperial Russia:

- Генеральный есаул (generalny yesaul) - General Yesaul
- Походный есаул (pokhodny yesaul) - Campaign Yesaul
- Войсковой есаул (voiskovoy yesaul) - Army Yesaul
- Полковой есаул (polkovoy yesaul) - Regimental Yesaul
- Артиллерийский есаул (artilleriysky yesaul) - Artillery Yesaul
- Сотенный есаул (sotenny yesaul) - Company Yesaul (commander of a sotnia)
- Станичный есаул (stanichny yesaul) - Yesaul of a stanitsa

== Cossack Hetmanate and Sloboda Ukraine ==
In Ukraine of the 17th and 18th centuries, an osaul was a military and administrative official performing the duties of aide-de-camp. The head of state, hetman, would appoint up to two osauls known as a General Osaul. There also was a Regimental Osaul as well as Company Osaul, with each regular cossack regiment and company except artillery having two of each. Beside them there were osauls under special assignments, one of them serving for General Obozny (quartermaster) who performed duties of a chief executive and was the second in importance after the Hetman.

=== General Osaul ===
A senior officer of the Hetmanate Cossack army who was a member of the general officer staff.

Duties

- supervising army's condition
- leading large detachments (wartime)
- managing muster rolls
- directing the army engineers
- commanding mercenary troops
- sometimes serving as an acting hetman

Other duties consisted of being a hetman's envoy, supervised matters of internal security, conducted annual regimental musters and inspections. Among the notorious osauls were Petro Doroshenko, Demian Mnohohrishny, Ivan Mazepa, and Ivan Skoropadsky.

From 1798 to 1800 after the liquidation of the Zaporizhian Host, the rank of osaul was equated with the ranks of rittmeister in cavalry and captain in infantry.

=== Regimental Osavul ===
Regimental Osavul (Ukrainian: Полковий осавул) is an assistant Colonel in Military Affairs.

=== Sotenny Osavul ===
Sotenny Osavul (Ukrainian: Сотенний осавул) is an assistant sotnik in Military Affairs.

== In popular culture ==
In the Ukrainian folk song "Zadumaly Bazylevtsi" (Ukrainian: Задумали Базилевці) about the anti-serfdom uprising in Turbaii (1789—1793), the wife of the Bazylevskyj family sends Yesauls to take care of the serfs, but they are met with unexpected resistance. The serfs end up invading the Bazylevskyj residence and murdering the land owners.
