= Cossack Rada =

Political institution in the Cossack Hetmanate and Zaporozhian Cossack culture

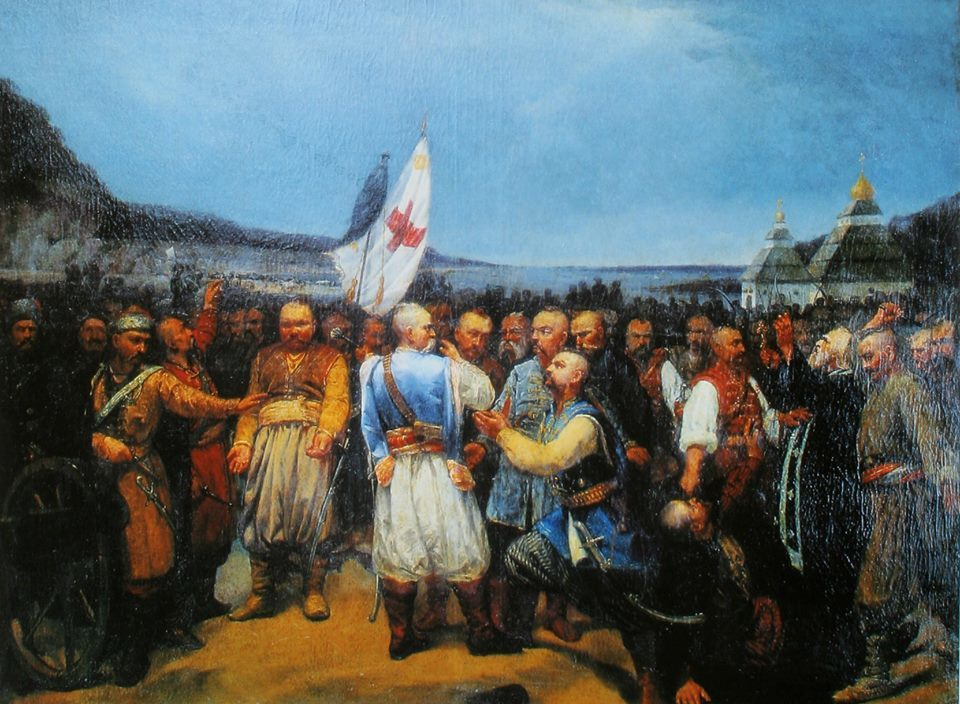
Last Rada on Sich, Viktor Kovaliov, mid-19th century

A Cossack Rada (Ukrainian: козацька рада, romanized: kozatska rada), also referred to as a General Host Council (Ukrainian: загальна військова рада, romanized: zahalna viiskova rada or Ukrainian: генеральна військова рада, romanized: heneralna viiskova rada), was a political institution that existed in the Cossack Hetmanate and the culture of Zaporozhian Cossacks. A Cossack Rada served as the legislative, administrative and judicial body of a sich, debating domestic and foreign politics. In order for a rada to be legitimate, tradition dictated that it must include the majority of men from a sich as members.

A Cossack Rada frequently included several thousand people, comprising men of all social estates. The rada of the Cossack Hetmanate had no set meeting place, though it frequently met in the town of Pereiaslav or at the banks of the Rosava river. It met on New Year's Day, the second or third day of Easter and the Intercession of the Theotokos, as well as at any time when a large group of the siroma, or Cossack peasantry, convened, though they required the approval of the kish otaman or the hetman.

The kish otaman was responsible for officiating a Cossack Rada, and was frequently the central figure of the rada in terms of both political importance and location. Votes were counted by show of participants' hands, by shouting, or by depositing hats into the centre of the rada's meeting place (where the kish otaman and other high-ranking officials were located). The organisation of a Cossack Rada was based on that of the historic veche, with participants being placed in a circle around the chief.

Originally, the Cossack Rada of the Hetmanate debated almost all matters, including land distribution, elections of military commanders, punishment of criminals and election of the hetman. A select few matters considered urgent and requiring secrecy, such as border disputes and the organisation of military campaigns, were delegated to a council of elders among Ukraine's cossacks. During wartime, a rada would convene at a military encampment. In such cases, it would be joined by non-Cossack peasantry, the bourgeois and the clergy of the Metropolis of Kyiv. Over time, as hetmans increasingly concentrated power in the late 17th century, the Cossack Rada lost much of its powers and became a largely-ceremonial body responsible for a hetman's election.

Various attempts were made to transform the Cossack Rada into a formal legislature elected by all Ukrainians, most notably by Ivan Vyhovsky, though they never succeeded. Other, local Cossack Radas often lacked powers, though radas of urban Cossacks or cities possessed limited authority.

A Cossack Rada convened without the consent of the Hetmanate's government was known as a black council (Ukrainian: чорна рада, romanized: chorna rada). This term was derived from the contemporary description of the lower classes as "black". Following the Chorna rada of 1663, the participation of those who were not chosen representatives of the Hetmanate's regiments was outlawed.

== Notable convocations ==
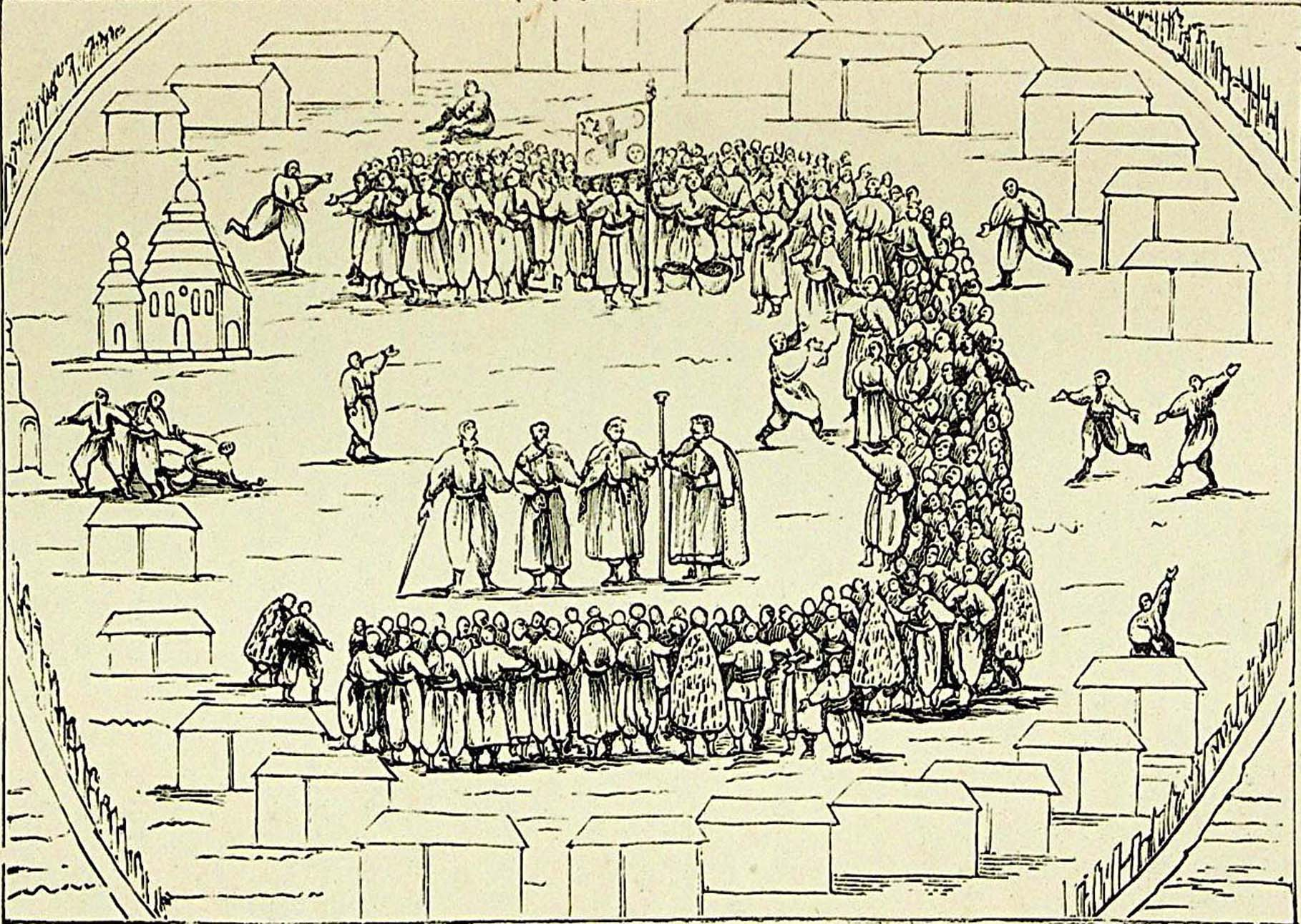
A contemporary depiction of a Cossack Rada at Zaporozhian Sich, 18th century

- 1648 (Sich): election of Bohdan Khmelnytsky as Hetman of Zaporizhian Host
- 1654 (Pereiaslav): adaptation of the Pereiaslav Agreement
- Council of Korsun (Korsun, 1657): adoption of the Treaty of Korsun, confirmation of Ivan Vyhovsky as Hetman
- 1659 (Hermanivka)
- Chorna rada of 1663 (Nizhyn, 1663): election of Ivan Briukhovetsky as Hetman
- 1669 (Korsun)
- 1669 (Hlukhiv)
- Council of the Three Regiments (Uman, 1669)
- 1684 (Mohyliv-Podilskyi)

== See also ==
- Black Council
- Sich Rada
