= General Military Chancellery =

The General Military Chancellery (Ukrainian: Генеральна військова канцелярія, romanized: Heneraljna vijsjkova kanceljarija) was the highest administrative institution of the Cossack Hetmanate in the 17th and 18th centuries. It was the central governing body responsible for communications, document flow, administrative work, and document storage. It was an important element of state administration in the Ukrainian Hetmanate, as the functioning of the entire state administration system depended on it.

== Establishment ==
The Chancellery was established by Bohdan Khmelnytsky during the Khmelnytsky Uprising of 1648–1657. It carried out all military, administrative, judicial and financial management. It was created on the basis of the Polish model of government: the Chancellery of Poland.

== Activities ==
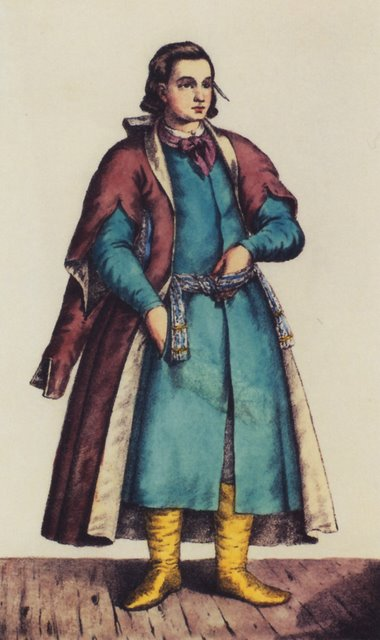
A Cossack clerk from Ukraine, 2nd half of the 18th century

Through the General Military Chancellery, the Hetman managed the military, diplomatic, administrative, and financial affairs of the state. Tatiana Tairova-Yakovleva (2020) characterised it as "serv[ing] simultaneously as the Ministry of Foreign Affairs and the Interior Ministry." In addition, it recorded all financial transactions and land affairs, and archived all records. The General Military Chancellery was subordinate to the Hetman, and its activities were directly managed by the General Chancellor (or Clerk).

=== Composition of the office ===
The office included all general officers, except for the general judge.

- the General Quartermaster (обозний, oboznyi), in charge of all military affairs (and at the Council of Officers, responsible for artillery);
- the General Chancellor (писар, pysar, also translated as "Clerk"), keeper of the seal, in charge of all the hetman's correspondence, including diplomatic correspondence.

It supervised the decisions of the General Military Court on criminal and political cases. All paperwork was conducted in Ukrainian.

=== Location of the office ===
The location of the Chancellery coincided with the Hetman's residence, which throughout the decades shifted from Chyhyryn, to Hadiach, to Baturyn, and finally to Hlukhiv.

The General Military Chancellery had a clerical office, where military clerks and other employees of this institution lived. Documents have been preserved stating that in the 1750s, the office quarters were in a state of "extreme disrepair" and, as a result, there was a need to construct new premises, the design for which was drawn up by the student architect K. Borzakivsky. He planned a residential building with 13 rooms, 2 storerooms and 2 hallways; a kitchen with an extension for servants and cooks; outbuildings (an icehouse for the steward's office and a barn); a stable with an oat barn next to it; a carriage house with a barn for harnesses next to it.

== Suppression by Russian emperors ==
On 28 November 1720, by decree of Peter I of Russia, the chancellery was stripped of its financial and judicial functions. From 1722, the activities of the General Military Chancellery were controlled by the Collegium of Little Russia (1722–1727).

In 1727–1734, during the hetmanate of Danylo Apostol, it was again subordinated to the hetman.

After his death, it was reorganised into the Board of the Hetman Government.

Under Hetman Kirill Razumovsky, it was restored and functioned until the final Liquidation of the autonomy of the Cossack Hetmanate by the Imperial Russian government on 10 (21 November) 1764.

== Literature ==
- Tairova-Yakovleva, Tatiana (2020). Ivan Mazepa and the Russian Empire (PDF). Montreal Kingston London Chicago: McGill-Queen's Press. p. 425. ISBN 978-0-2280-0309-0.
- Панашенко В. В. Генеральна військова канцелярія // Encyclopedia of History of Ukraine : in 10 vols. / editors: V. A. Smolii (head) and others. ; Institute of History of Ukraine, National Academy of Sciences of Ukraine. Kyiv: Naukova Dumka, 2004. Vol. 2 : G — D. p. 74. ISBN 966-00-0405-2.
- Довідник з історії України
- В. І. Сергійчук. Генеральна військова канцелярія // Українська дипломатична енциклопедія [Ukrainian Diplomatic Encyclopaedia]: У 2-х т./Редкол.:Л. В. Губерський (голова) та ін. — Kyiv: Знання України, 2004 — Т.1 — 760с. ISBN 966-316-039-X
