= Cossack starshyna =

General title for Cossack military authority

Among Zaporozhian Cossacks, starshyna (Ukrainian: старши́на, Ukrainian pronunciation: [stɐrˈʃɪnɐ]) was a collective noun for administrative categories of military officers and state officials. In common parlance the term referred to the privileged social stratum of the Cossack society.

Starshyna was subdivided into:

- General Starshyna (Генеральна старшина), headed by Hetman (or Quartermaster General as acting Hetman)
  - Quartermaster General (Генеральний обозний)
  - Judge General (Генеральний суддя)
  - Secretary General (Генеральний писар)
  - Adjutant General (Генеральний осавул)
  - Treasurer General (Генеральний підскарбій)
  - Ensign General (Генеральний хорунжий)
  - Bunchuk General (Генеральний бунчужний)
- Regimental (Polkova) Starshyna, headed by Polkovnyk (Colonel)
  - Regimental Obozni (Quartermaster) (Ukrainian: Полковий обозний) – first Deputy Colonel. He was in charge of artillery and fortress fortifications. In the absence of a colonel he replaced him, but he was not authorized to issue universal orders (as opposed to the commanding colonel).
  - Regimental Judge (Ukrainian: Полковий суддя) – was in charge of a civil court in the ratusha
  - Regimental Osavul (Ukrainian: Полковий осавул) – assistant Colonel in Military Affairs
  - Regimental Khorunzhyi (Ukrainian: Полковий хорунжий) – commander of the "Khorunzhy Cossacks", guarding the colonel and the starshyna. He was in charge of regimental music and was responsible for keeping the khorugv (regiment flag).
  - Regimental scribe (Ukrainian: Полковий писар, romanized: Polkovyi pysar) – secretaries at the ratusha. One was in charge of military affairs, and the other of civilian affairs.
Some members of the regimental starshyna, 18th century

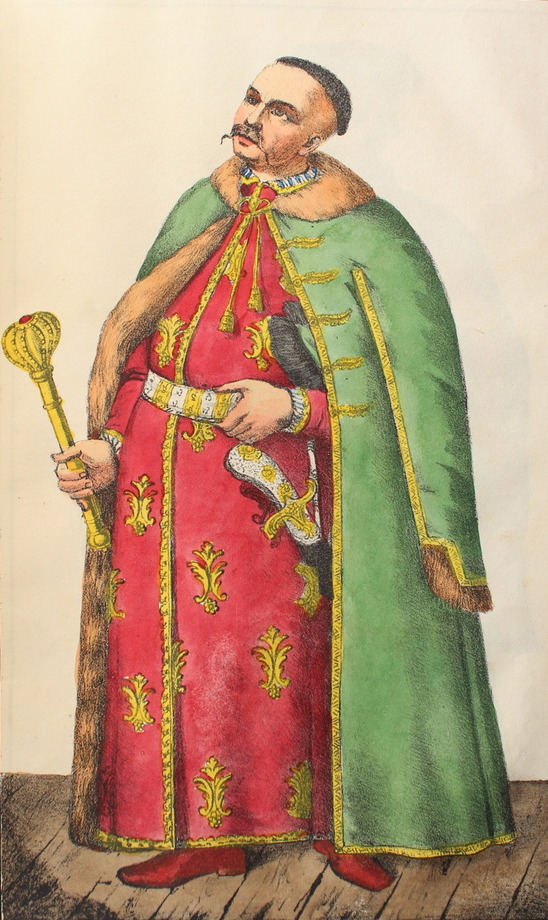
Polkovnyk

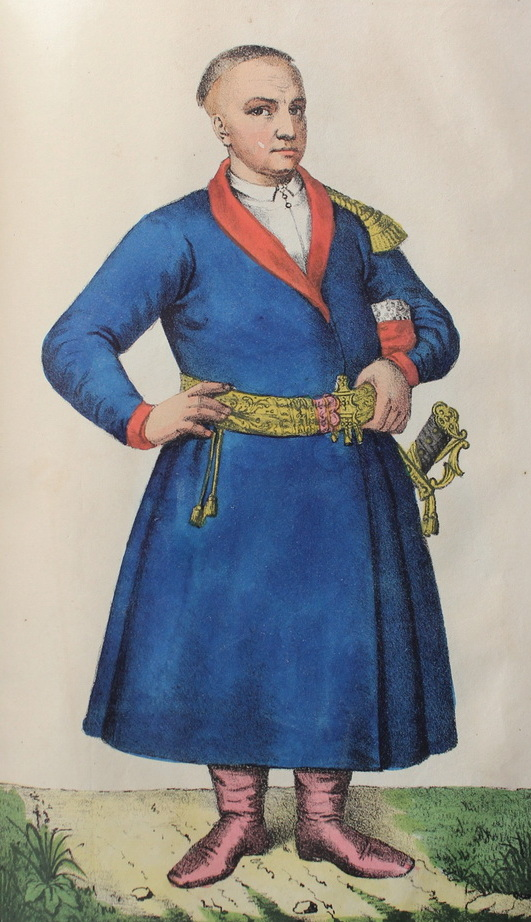
Sotnyk

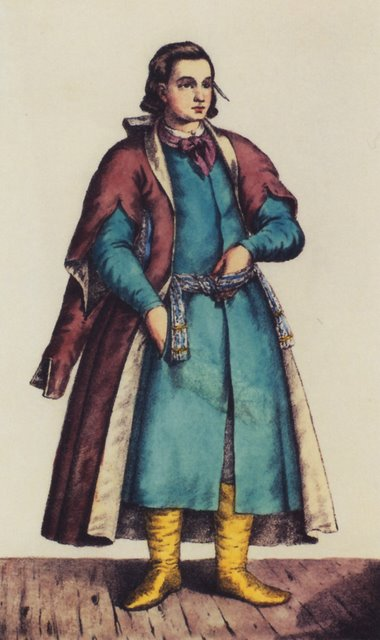
Scribe
- Starshyna of Hundred (Sotenna) – headed by Sotnyk
  - Sotenny otaman (Ukrainian: Сотенний отаман) – the deputy Sotnyk, implemented the duties of an obozni and a judge on a sotnia level
  - Sotenny Osavul (Ukrainian: Сотенний осавул) – assistant sotnik in military affairs
  - Sotenny Khorunzhy (Ukrainian: Сотенний хорунжий) – headed the sotnia's flags
  - Sotenny Scribe (Ukrainian: Сотенний писар) – a secretary
- Junior Starshyna (Молодша старшина) – headed by Otaman
- Chancellery: Regimental scribe, General scribe

Later, sometime after the Khmelnytsky's Uprising, it was also associated with the Ukrainian nobility which derived out of the officership and the Hetman.

== See also ==
- Distinguished Military Fellows
- Hetman of the Zaporizhian Cossacks
