= Ukrainian Americans in New York City =

Ethnic group

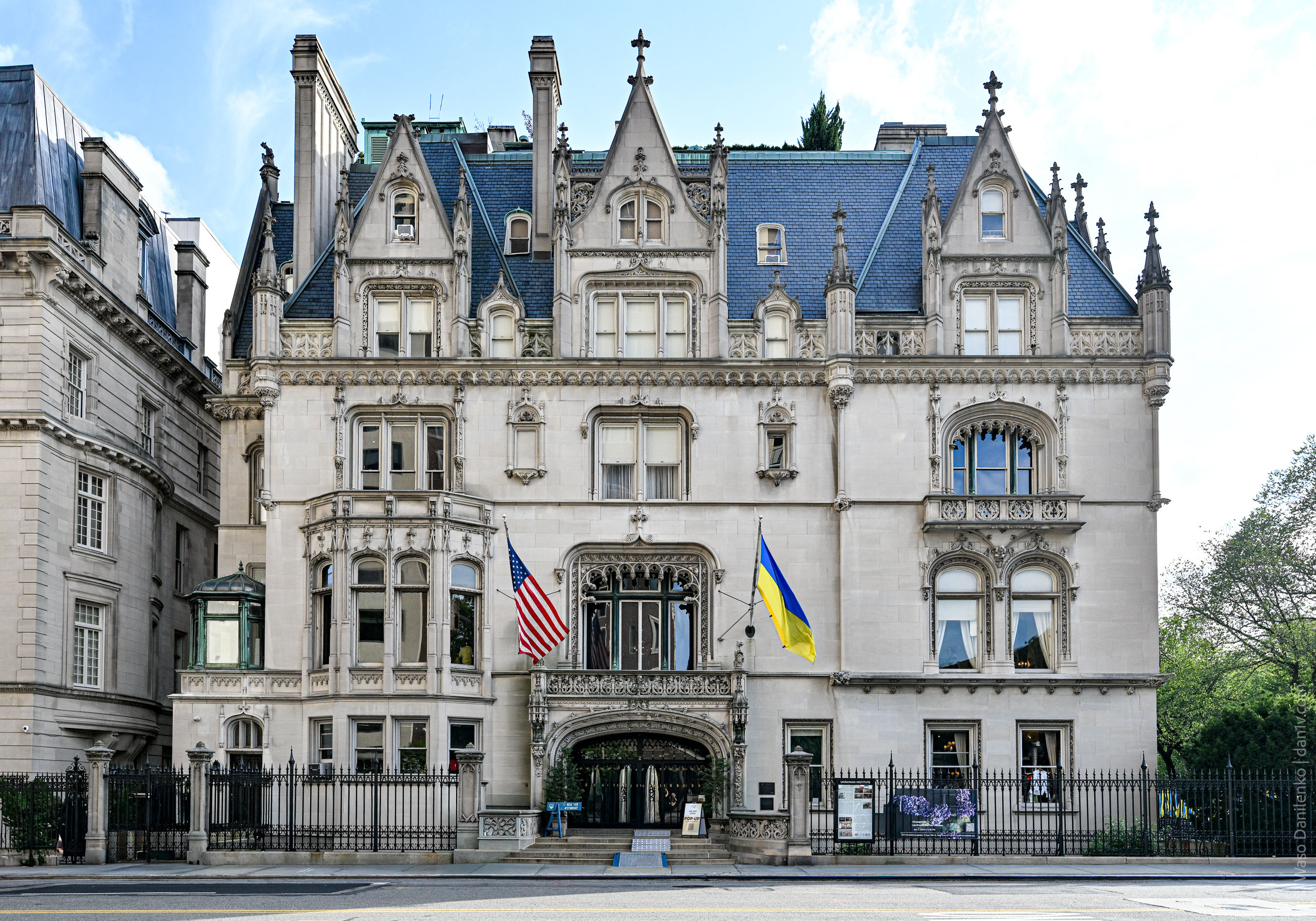
Harry F. Sinclair House (1897-1899), a National Historic Landmark, houses Ukrainian Institute of America which seeks to promote Ukrainian arts and literature, it also features occasional art exhibitions that are open to public. It is located along the prestigious Museum Mile in Manhattan, New York City.

Ukrainian Americans have been present in New York City as early as the 17th century when the city was called New Amsterdam. However, the first Ukrainian mass immigration wave to New York City occurred during 1870–1899, coinciding with other mass European influxes into the city.

== Little Ukraine ==
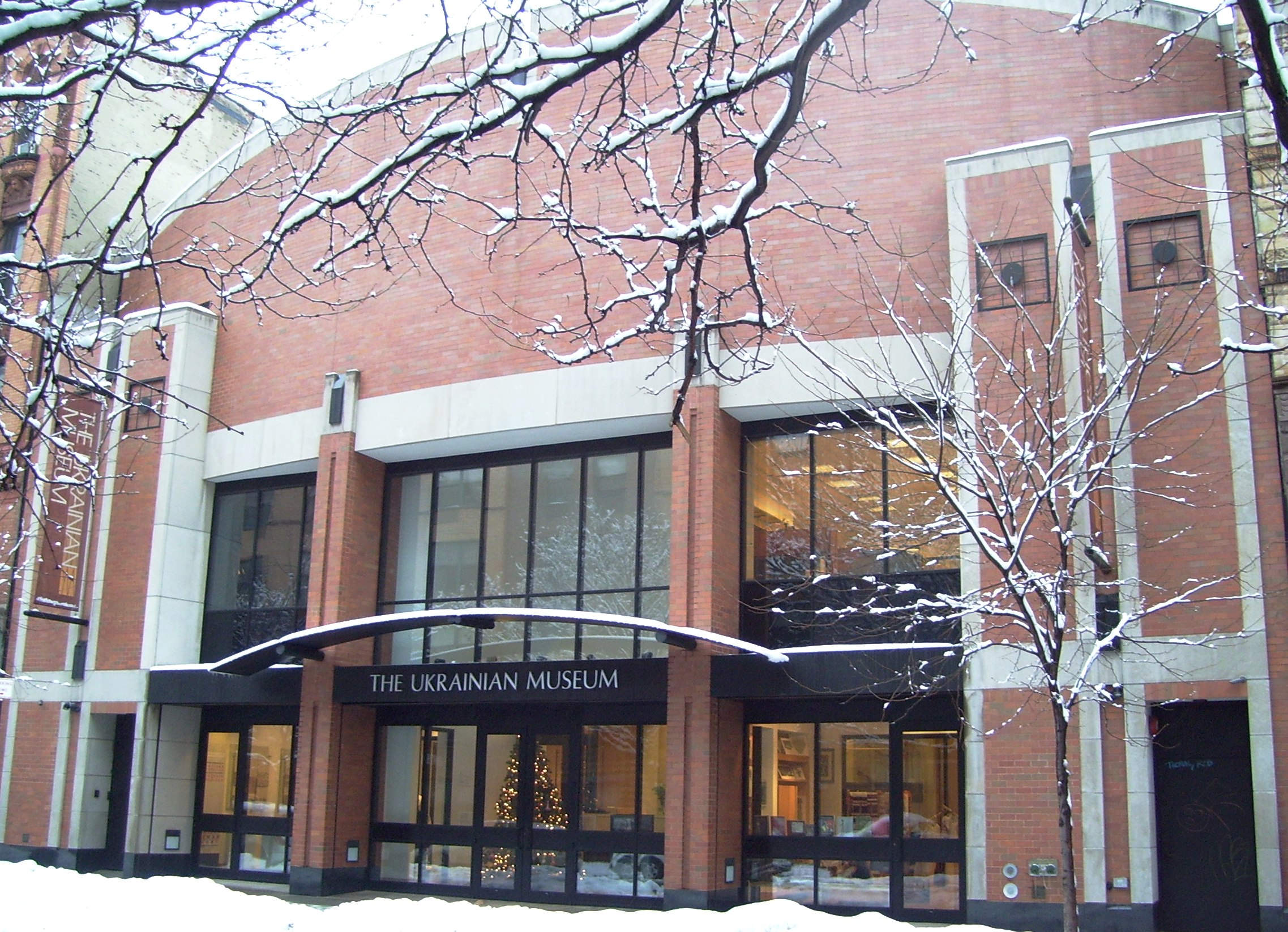
The Ukrainian Museum in Little Ukraine

The traditional Ukrainian area in New York City is called Ukrainian Village, Little Ukraine or the Ukrainian East Village, and is located within the East Village in Manhattan. Ukrainian population of Little Ukraine topped around 60,000 residents after World War II, which dwindled subsequently. Today about a third of approximately 80,000 Ukrainian Americans living in New York City are residing in Little Ukraine, which is bounded by Houston Street and 14th Street, and Third Avenue and Avenue A.

The Annual Ukrainian Festival takes place on the weekend closest to May 17 on 7th Street between Second and Third Avenues. The festival also borders Taras Shevchenko Place, a small street connecting East 6th and East 7th Streets, named after Taras Shevchenko, a renowned Ukrainian poet, artist and humanist. In the wake of the Russo-Ukrainian War, supporters of a Ukraine free of Russian intervention built a shrine on Second Avenue and 9th street, which incorporated photographs of victims, flowers and candles.

== History ==
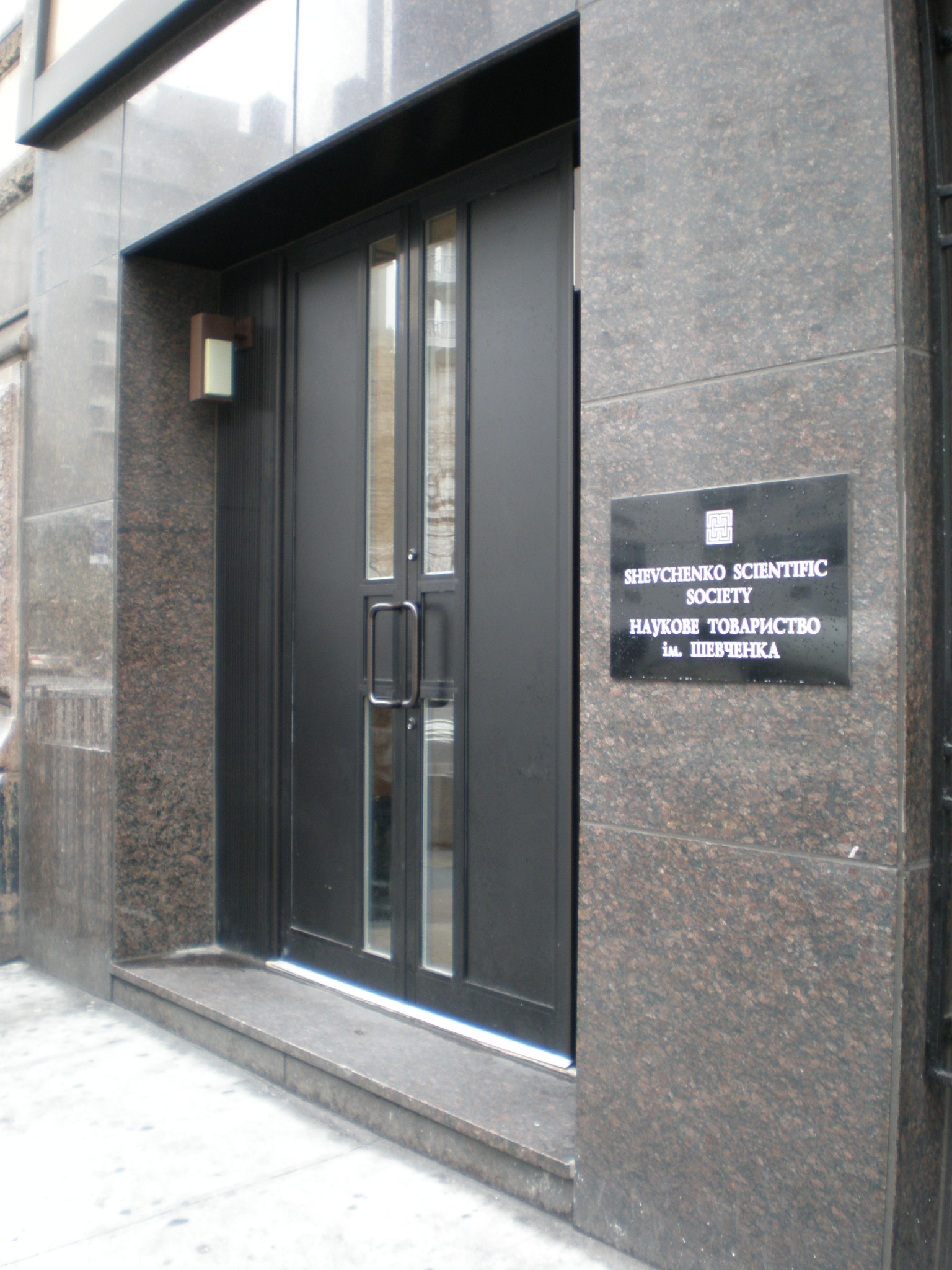
Entrance to the Shevchenko Scientific Society at 63 Fourth Avenue in Manhattan.

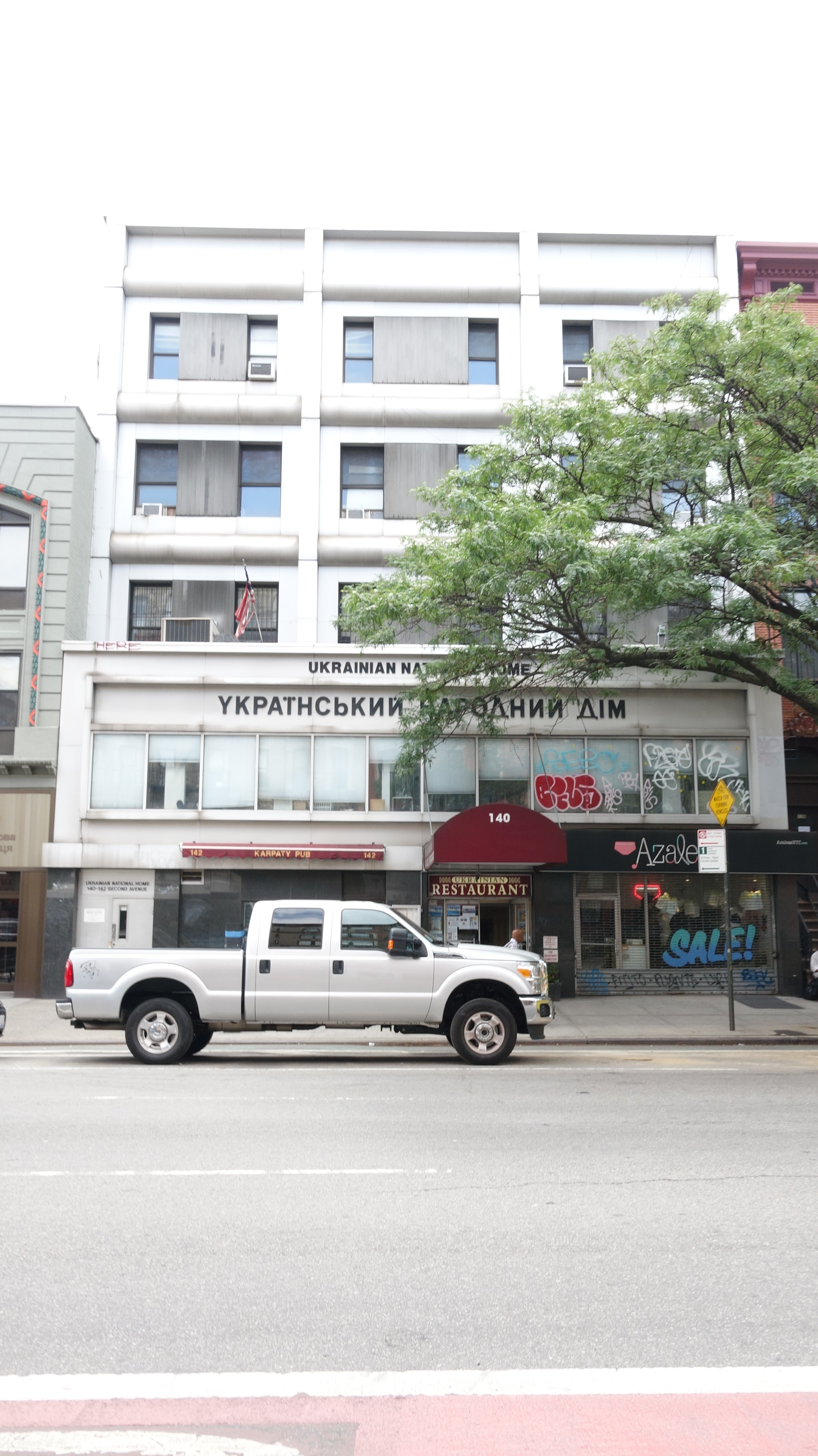
Ukrainian National Home on second avenue

Religious practices played an important role for early Ukrainian immigrants in New York City, first Ukrainian rite liturgy took place on October 10, 1890 and 15 years later St. George's Ukrainian Catholic Church was established.

Ukrainian National Women's League of America was established in New York City in 1925, promoting specifically arts and culture, among other activities. The UNWLA organized folk art exhibitions in New York City and elsewhere in the United States. In 1976 their activities culminated with the founding of The Ukrainian Museum that included permanent exhibitions. The museum was hailed as one of the finest achievements of the Ukrainian American community.

The Shevchenko Scientific Society established its branch and United States headquarters in 1947 in New York City. It is a respectable institution dedicated to scholarly research and public service. Its international membership body included such renowned former members as Albert Einstein and Max Planck. The society is located at 63 Fourth Avenue.

In 1948 a prominent Ukrainian immigrant New-Yorker, William Dzus, self-made millionaire, inventor and owner of Dzus Fastener Company, founded the Ukrainian Institute of America. William Dzus came to America with $25 in his pockets and worked his way up from the very bottom, epitomizing the American success story for the Ukrainian community. Dzus charitable contributions to his community culminated with the purchase of the famous Harry F. Sinclair House for the use of the institute, which became central to Ukrainian American educational, scientific, cultural and humanitarian life in New York City.

== See also ==
- Ukrainian Village, Chicago
- American Coalition for Ukraine
- Nova Ukraine
