= Eva Kurilets =

Ukrainian human rights activist

- Occupation: Human rights activist

Evelina Kurilets (or Eva Kurilets) is a Ukrainian human rights activist and is the executive director of Razom, an organization that secures aid for Ukraine.

Before the Russo-Ukrainian War, Kurilets worked in the finance industry and several charities. She was forced to flee Kyiv for the United States when the Russians invaded Ukraine. In 2021, she was appointed to lead Razom for Ukraine, operating in Ukraine, the U.S., and Canada. The organization is the largest Ukrainian aid program. It provides financial, medical, logistical, and other forms of aid to Ukrainian civilians and soldiers.
