= Nova Ukraine =

U.S. nonprofit supporting Ukraine

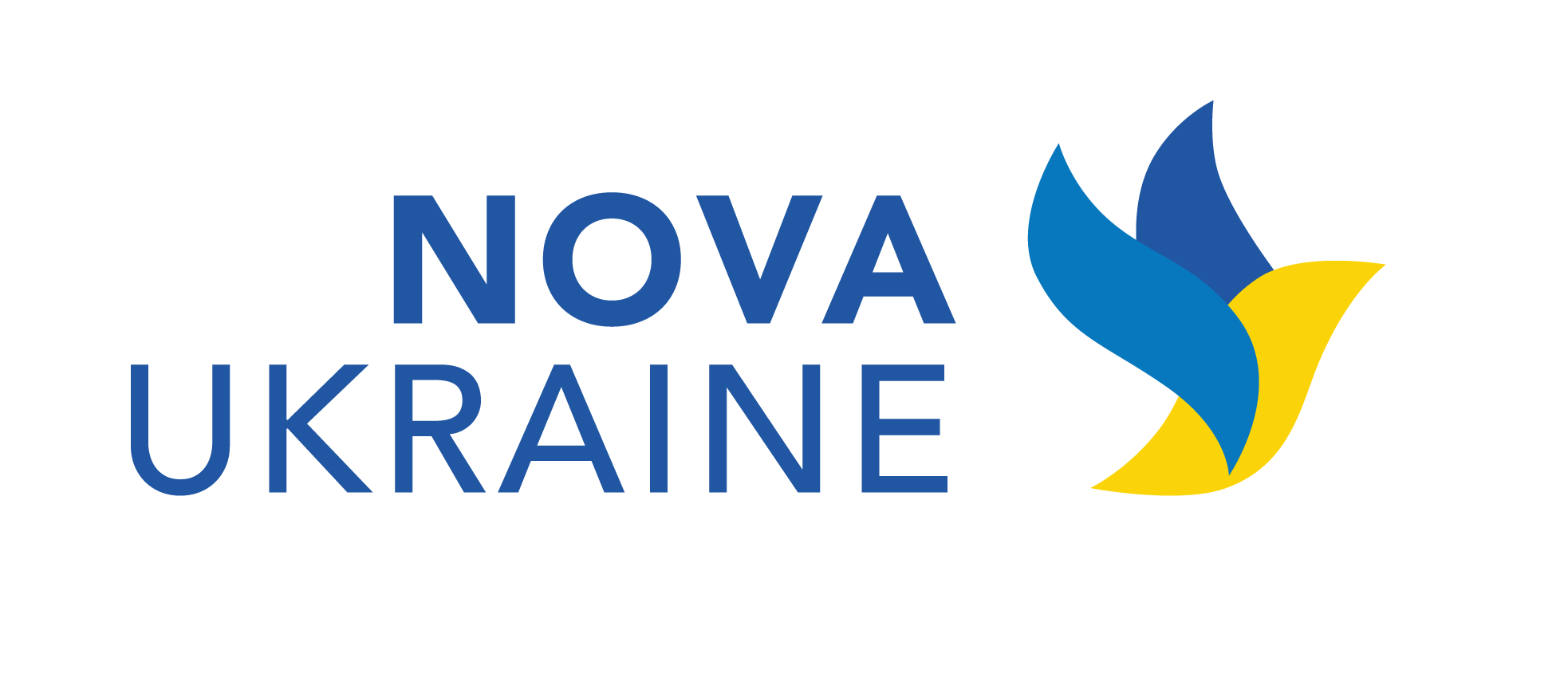
- Formation: March 2014; 12 years ago
- Founders: Nick Bilogorskiy; Ostap Korkuna
- Type: U.S. 501(c)(3) organization; charitable organization
- Tax ID no.: 46-5335435
- Purpose: aid and services to the people of Ukraine, strengthening the civil society in Ukraine, and promoting Ukrainian culture
- Headquarters: Palo Alto, California, U.S.
- Location: Palo Alto, CA; Washington, DC; New York, NY; Houston, TX; Chicago, IL; Kyiv, Ukraine; Lviv, Ukraine; Kharkiv, Ukraine; Odesa, Ukraine
- Coordinates: 37.44403°N 122.16111°W
- Official languages: English, Ukrainian
- CEO: Erin Elizabeth McKee
- CDO: Jeff Kramer
- Board of directors: Nick Bilogorskiy (chair), Iryna Bilokin, Igor L. Markov, Rodion Yaryy, Serhiy Kishchenko
- Subsidiaries: Nova Ukraine in Ukraine
- Affiliations: American Coalition for Ukraine
- Revenue: US$41.2 million (2024)
- Expenses: US$31.3 million (2024)
- Volunteers: over 100 in the U.S.
- Awards: Four-star rating on Charity Navigator; Platinum Transparency Seal (2025) from GuideStar (Candid)
- Website: novaukraine.org

Nova Ukraine is a U.S.-based 501(c)(3) nonprofit founded in March 2014 that delivers humanitarian aid, medical supplies, and services to communities in Ukraine. Its name translates as "New Ukraine". The organization was established by a coalition of Ukrainian-American volunteers in response to the annexation of Crimea and the broader instability following the Euromaidan protests in Ukraine and the Revolution of Dignity.

Nova Ukraine coordinates grassroots relief efforts, operates humanitarian initiatives, supports education, culture and civil society, and carries out advocacy campaigns supporting Ukraine and its diaspora. The organization operates across multiple program areas. Its medical aid division, known as the Heal initiative, has supported more than 600 medical institutions and delivered surgical instruments, diagnostic equipment, and rehabilitation technologies to hospitals in Ukraine since 2022. Through its people support programs, Nova Ukraine has assisted refugees, internally displaced persons, coordinated evacuations and established educational initiatives in collaboration with international partners including the Howard G. Buffett Foundation. The organization's public infrastructure efforts have delivered generators, emergency equipment, and solar panels to critical facilities across Ukraine. Focus reported that the organization sent more than US$130 million in aid to Ukraine through May 2025.

Nova Ukraine is headquartered in Palo Alto, California, and since 2022 has established volunteer chapters across eight U.S. states and the District of Columbia, along with operational offices in Ukraine. The organization's board is chaired by Nick Bilogorskiy, one of its co-founders alongside Ostap Korkuna. In August 2025, Erin McKee was appointed chief executive officer of Nova Ukraine. The organization is a founding member of the American Coalition for Ukraine.

Two co-founders were each awarded the Order of Merit (Ukraine) 3rd class in 2022 and 2023 by President Volodymyr Zelenskyy in recognition of their leadership in humanitarian relief efforts. Nick Bilogorskiy was included in Ukrainska Pravda's annual ranking “UP 100: Power of Influence” as #2 in the Society category. The organization has received recognition from major charity evaluation platforms, including a four-star rating from Charity Navigator in 2024 and a Platinum Transparency Seal from GuideStar in 2025.

== History and founding ==
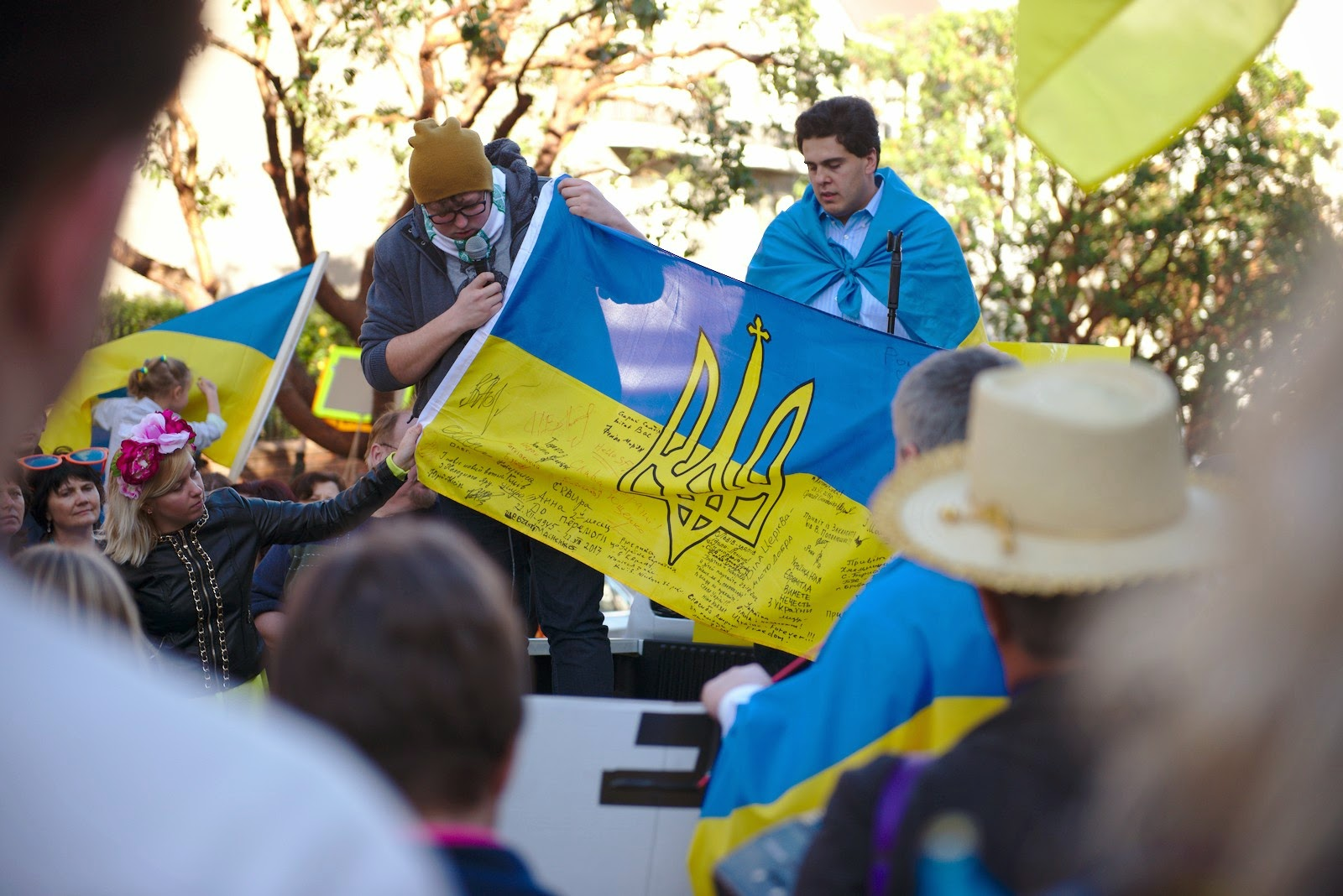
Euromaidan solidarity rally in San Francisco with Nick Bilogorskiy and Sergey Kishchenko, 2013

In March 2014, in the aftermath of the Euromaidan movement, a coalition of Ukrainian-American volunteers established Nova Ukraine in response to Russia’s annexation of Crimea, aiming to coordinate grassroots relief efforts. The organization hosted cultural events and advocacy rallies in the San Francisco Bay Area, coordinated multimodal aid shipments to Ukraine, and partnered with relief organizations such as UNICEF and local volunteer networks.

=== The founding years ===
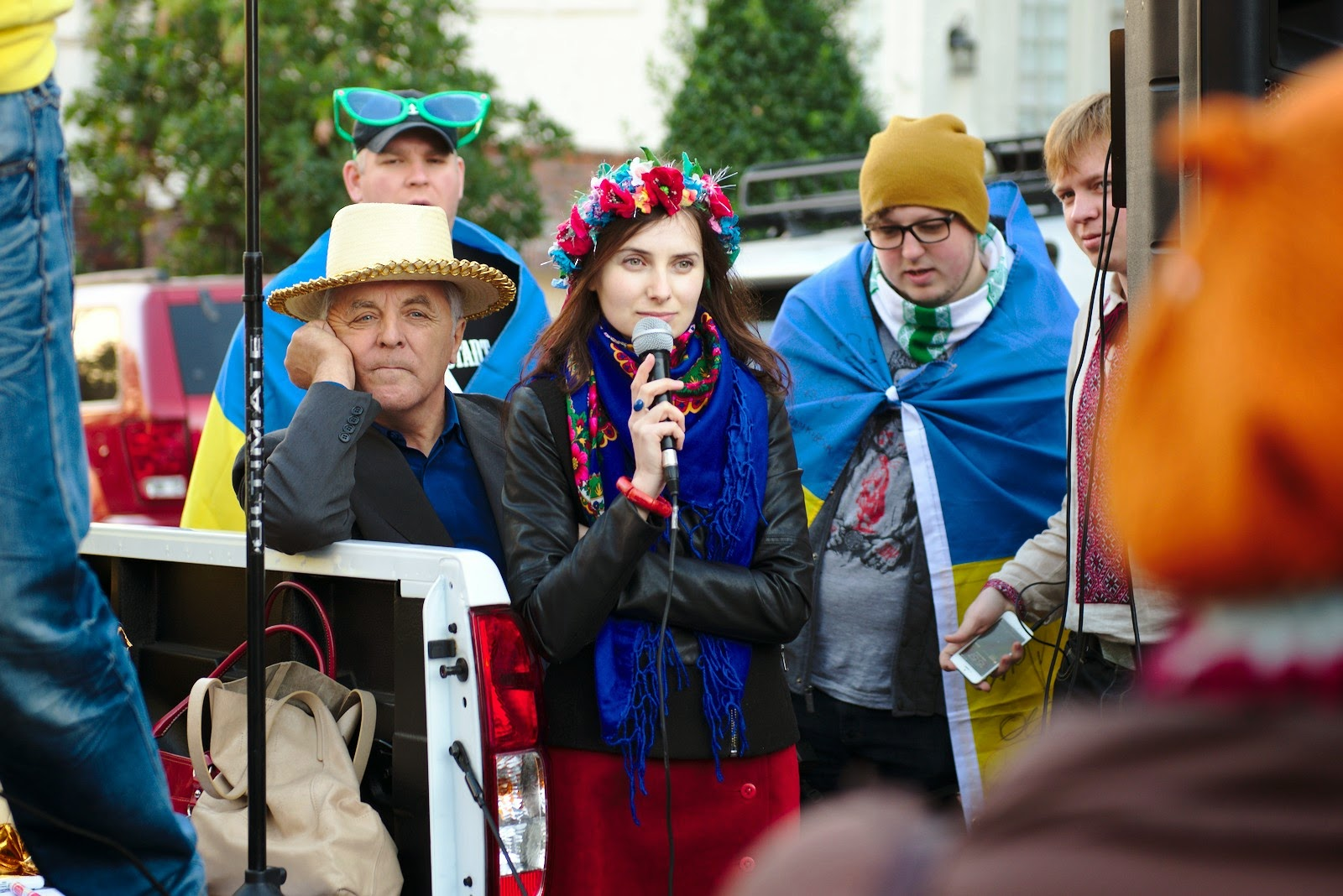
Iryna Bilokin' and Sergey Kishchenko speaking at a Euromaidan solidarity rally in San Francisco in 2014.

In 2014, Nova Ukraine co-organized concerts in San Francisco that raised nearly $100,000 in humanitarian aid for Ukraine, supporting internally displaced persons and families from conflict zones. Ticket sales from a performance by Okean Elzy funded $23,000 worth of medical equipment for hospitals in Ukraine. A performance by Skryabin (band) in San Francisco raised funds for Nova Ukraine's charitable projects, and a fundraiser with Eurovision winner Ruslana funded support for displaced people.

=== The Heart2Heart program ===
Launched in 2015, Heart2Heart is a long-term initiative where volunteers in California collect and ship donations, such as clothing and food, to vulnerable populations in Ukraine, including disadvantaged families, orphans, and disabled individuals. Heart2Heart delivered 80,000 pounds of humanitarian aid to Ukraine in 2018 and 55,000 pounds in 2019. Each year, the organization delivered approximately 600 pounds of Christmas and New Year presents to children across Ukraine.

=== COVID years ===
In 2020 and 2021, Nova Ukraine worked to counter the coronavirus pandemic by equipping Ukrainian doctors and nurses with personal protective equipment. It purchased and distributed more than 4,200 FFP2 respirators and 2,000 protective suits to 14 hospitals in Ukraine. It also distributed oxygen concentrators for hospital patients in 2020 and 2021. The Heart2Heart program continued supplying essential goods to children and adults with disabilities. Nova Ukraine also supported Ukrainian veterans and soldiers, contributed to the ENGin project for youth language skills and promoted Ukrainian cinema.

=== Supporting Ukraine during full-scale invasion ===
Nova Ukraine started expanding its operations in the weeks before Russia's invasion of Ukraine in February 2022. It organized street rallies in support of Ukraine in the San Francisco Bay Area, mobilized local diaspora, and provided commentary on developing events to local, national and international media. It launched emergency aid efforts and raised funds in partnership with UNICEF USA. Nova Ukraine used software tools to streamline its operations. To enhance aid delivery, the organization implemented a grants management platform on Salesforce.

By the end of 2024, Nova Ukraine distributed more than $110 million in aid and services in Ukraine during the full-scale invasion, reaching 8 million people. To manage the scale of its operations, the organization established teams specializing in medical aid, public infrastructure in Ukraine, people support (vulnerable populations, education, culture) and advocacy, each with heavy reliance on unpaid volunteer work.

In 2026, Nova Ukraine was designated as an undesirable organization in Russia.

== Programs and initiatives ==
The organization describes its work in four program areas: Heal delivers medical supplies and strengthens healthcare services. Build focuses on infrastructure and reslience projects; Empower tackles educational, cultural, rehabilitation, and social programs for vulnerable populations and civil society; and Advocate raises awareness of issues affecting Ukraine and Ukrainian communities, and encouraging public engagement on humanitarian and policy matters.

The organization’s spending and activities have been concentrated in emergency medical aid and basic-needs support.

=== Medical work (Heal) ===
Since February 2022, Nova Ukraine has coordinated with national government, regional authorities, and local hospitals to address shortages of medications, diagnostics, and power-independent devices, while also establishing pain treatment and rehabilitation initiatives for war-injured civilians and veterans.

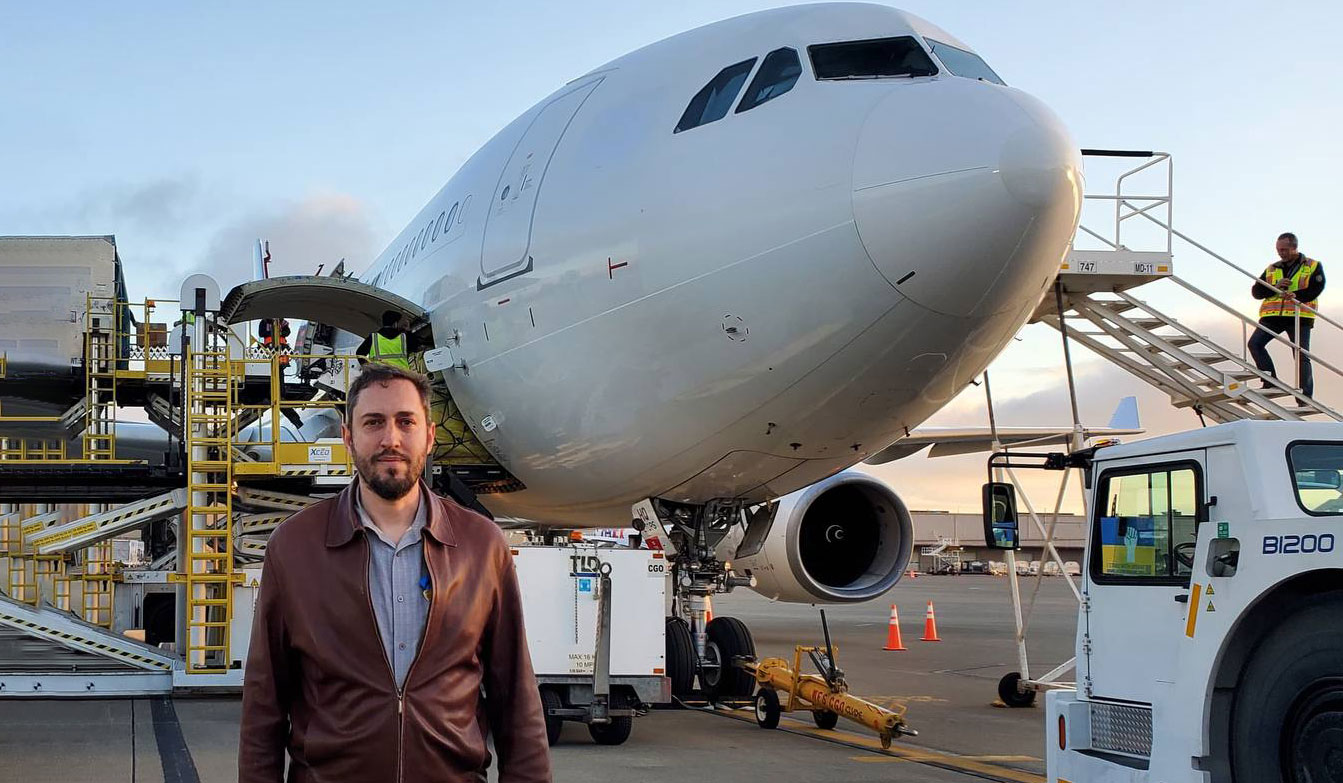
Nova Ukraine coordinated the shipment of 32 tons of medical supplies to Ukraine in March 2022.

In 2022, the organization reported prioritizing hospital requests and procuring medications and supplies through domestic and international purchasing.

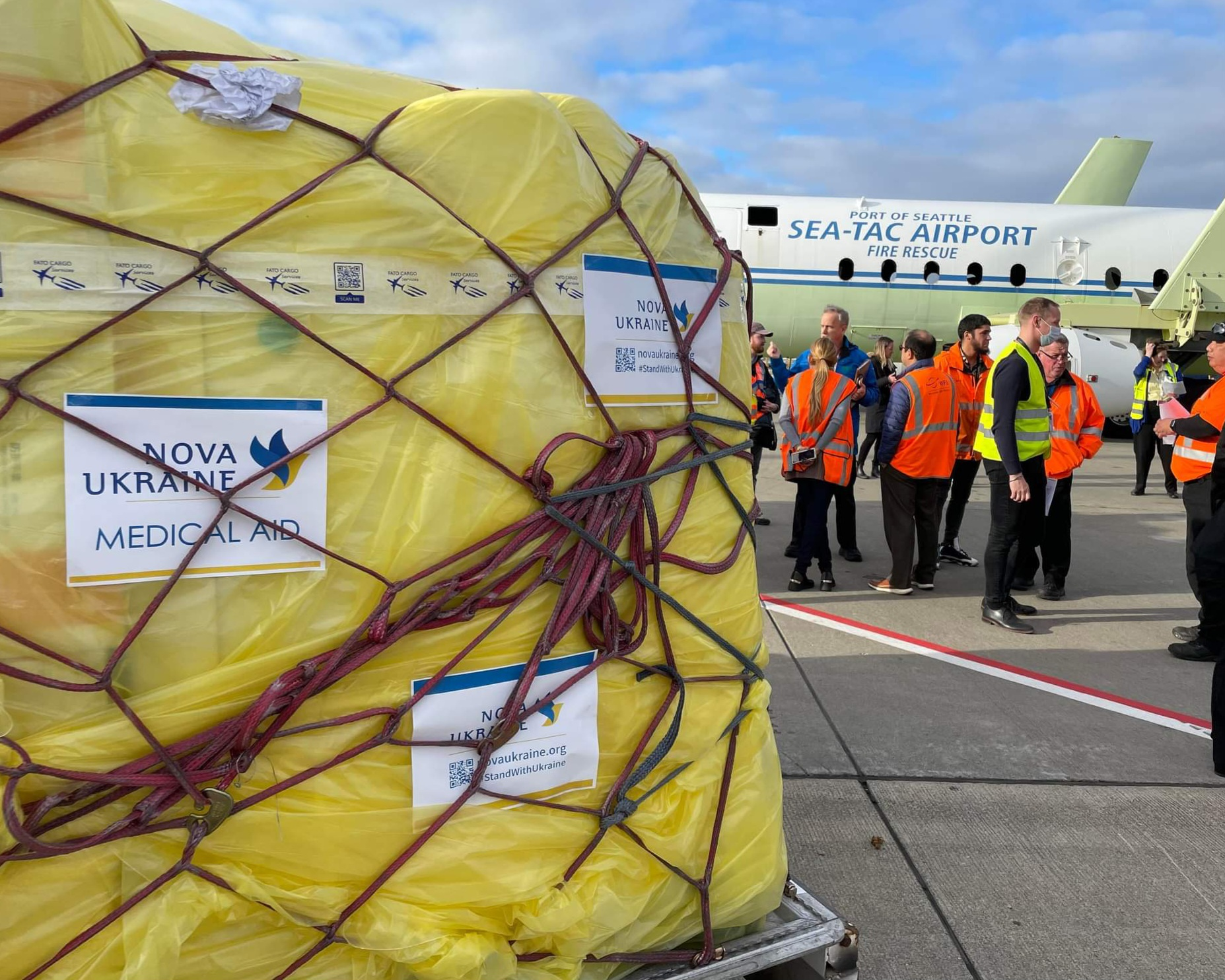
Nova Ukraine cargo at the Seattle-Tacoma International Airport before its transfer to Ukraine via Poland, March 2022

In March 2022, Nova Ukraine partnered with several Ukrainian organizations, including the Ukrainian Student Association at Stanford, to deliver $3.5 million worth of medical supplies, such as bandages, surgery kits, and pediatric medicines, to Ukraine. The supplies were flown from Seattle to Poland and then transported to Ukraine for distribution by the Ministry of Health. The organization also worked with Unite with Ukraine and the Ukrainian World Congress to purchase 9,000 medical tourniquets.

In 2023, Nova Ukraine responded to emergencies in Ukraine and modernized healthcare facilities in the region. With support from partners like ZDOROVI and funding from Pioneer Natural Resources, Nova Ukraine provided modern equipment such as portable incubators and electric generators to 50 neonatal hospitals and clinics, purchased six ambulances and had them delivered through Enkidu.

In 2023, amid repeated strikes and power disruptions affecting healthcare facilities, the organization supplied generators and portable diagnostic equipment for frontline and field use. In total, Nova Ukraine’s Heal initiative supported over 600 medical institutions, distributed a million dollars worth of medical packs, delivered more than 2,000 hospital beds and surgical tables, and provided over 47,000 surgical instruments and 37 prostheses for complex amputation patients. One year after the full-scale Russian invasion of Ukraine, San Francisco Chronicle reported that Nova Ukraine had distributed $55 million in humanitarian aid, more than half of which went to emergency first aid, hospital medicine, supplies, and medical equipment.

Nova Ukraine signed a two-year Memorandum of Cooperation with the Ministry of Health of Ukraine to provide medical equipment, prosthetics, medications, and rehabilitation programs. Delivered equipment included ventilators, X-ray devices, ultrasound systems, and chemotherapy medicine, in response to numerous hospital requests. Nova Ukraine launched the “Ukraine Without Pain” partnership with the Ministry of Health of Ukraine, aiming to establish a nationwide network of pain treatment centers, train specialists in modern pain medicine protocols, and equip facilities with rehabilitation technologies for chronic pain and post-traumatic recovery. Throughout 2024, the initiative distributed medical equipment and supplies valued at $6 million to over 120 specialized hospitals in collaboration with Medical Bridges and MedGlobal. In 2024, the initiative reported distributing over 43,000 tourniquets and significant quantities of first-aid kits, medical equipment (such as ultra-sound and defibrillators), generators, operating tables, and training materials to training centers. Through Project MedHub, Nova Ukraine assisted more than 13,000 wounded Ukrainian service members and delivered aid worth $150,000, supporting military medics and medical evacuation units.

In 2025, Nova Ukraine received the first place in the “Charity in Healthcare” category at Charitable Ukraine 2024.

=== Public infrastructure in Ukraine (Build) ===
In 2022, San Jose Fire Department donated safety and firefighting equipment worth more than $1 million to Ukrainian first responders, to be distributed by relief organizations including Nova Ukraine and Firefighter Air Ukraine. The donation included self-contained breathing apparatus packs, regulators, air cylinders, and masks. Additionally, Nova Ukraine, in collaboration with Firefighter Aid Ukraine, collected over $3 million worth of rescue equipment and medical supplies from Canadian fire stations, which were delivered to State Emergency Service of Ukraine.

In January 2023, Nova Ukraine and Razom were noted for assembling 1,263 generators in Ukraine 30 days. In 2023, the Charitable Foundation of the Energy Bar Association announced a $50,000 Cornerstone Grant to Nova Ukraine to fund generators intended for hospitals and warming centers in Ukraine. Working with Nevados, Nova Ukraine helped install solar panels in schools in Chernihiv, so that they remain operational during power outages caused by the 2022 invasion. The organization also partnered with the Ministry of Education to enhance digital education and promote STEM programs across Ukraine.

In partnership with the Howard G. Buffett Foundation and Ukrainian Railways, Nova Ukraine established 96 initial Points of Invincibility that provided shelter, heat, charging stations, and Wi-Fi routers to people affected by energy blackouts in Ukraine. The organization installed a water treatment plant in Kherson and delivered generators to hospitals.

=== People support (Empower) ===
From the beginning of Russia's invasion of Ukraine, Nova Ukraine supported evacuation efforts in Ukraine helping people relocate away from the frontlines. Nova Ukraine established a team to support Ukrainian refugees in the U.S., Mexico, and Europe. Volunteers provided aid at refugee camps, helped families apply for humanitarian parole, and offered legal assistance, particularly at border crossings like San Ysidro. The organization also helped refugees find housing in the U.S. and Europe, and compiled updates on legal developments. In reporting on Ukrainian refugees arriving in the United States, the Los Angeles Times described Nova Ukraine’s role in assisting displaced individuals and families, including helping connect refugees with local organizations providing housing and employment support.

Following the destruction of the Kakhovka Dam in 2023, Nova Ukraine delivered over 35 tons of food and water to 12,000 flooding victims. The organization also facilitated the evacuation of over 3,700 people and animals and provided essential equipment for first responders.

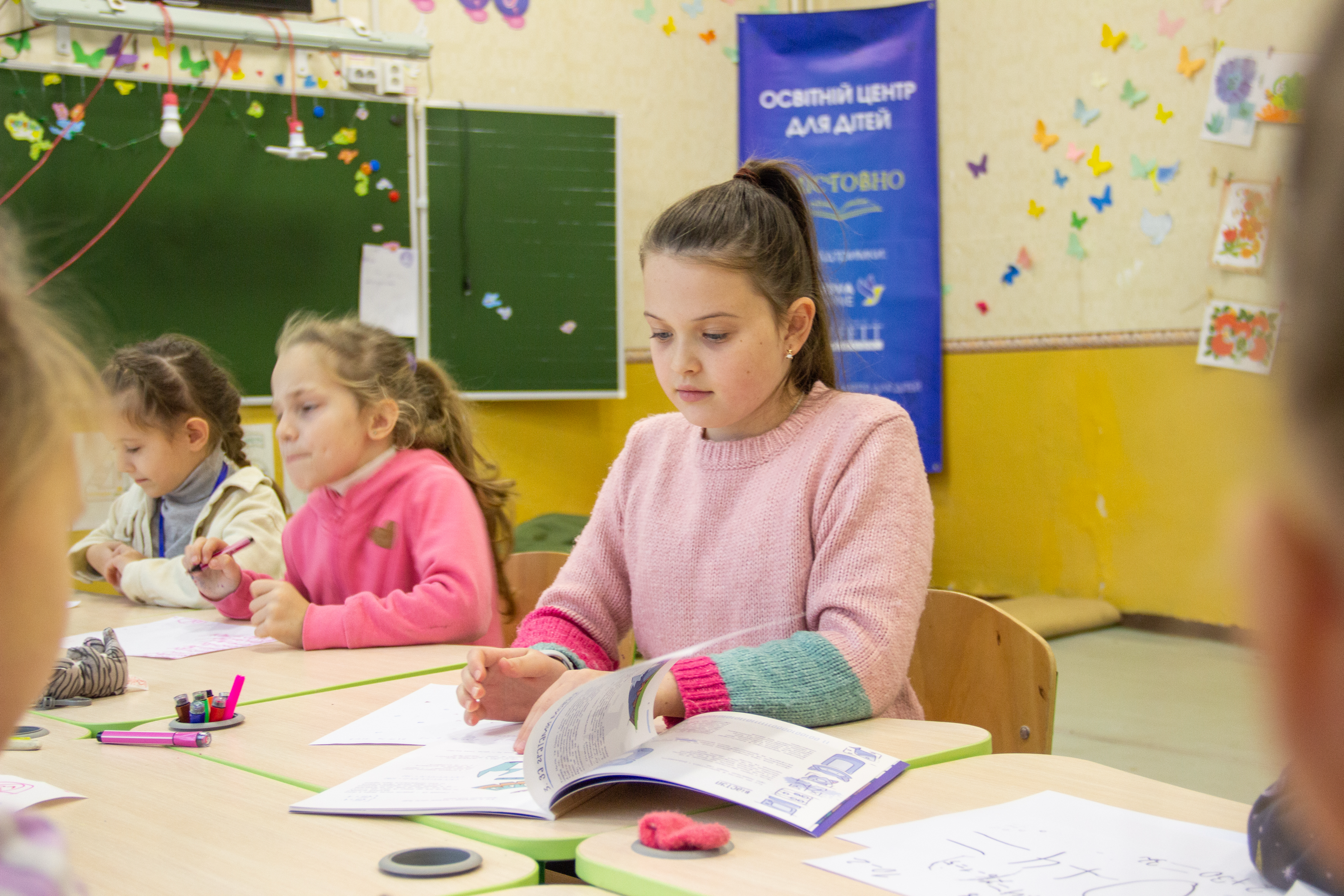
Children at a Zmistovno after-school center supported by Nova Ukraine, 2023

Since 2023, Nova Ukraine collaborated with the Howard G. Buffett Foundation to establish 30 after-school centers under the "Zmistovno" brand, offering educational resources to children facing challenges due to the war and the COVID-19 pandemic.

The organization partnered with the European Bank for Reconstruction and Development to provide the Okhmatdyt Pediatric Clinic in Kyiv with a pediatric mobility rehabilitation system.

Nova Ukraine has participated in cultural programming that promotes Ukrainian storytelling and media, including co-supporting public events in the United States that featured documentary and narrative presentations related to the war in Ukraine. In 2025, the English-language volume "Living the War: Civilians in the Army" was produced and printed in Ukraine with support from nonprofits including Nova Ukraine, the KSE Foundation, and Protect Ukraine. This project was cited in Ukrainska Pravda as an example of Nova Ukraine’s contribution to cultural diplomacy and public education by amplifying civilian narratives from the Russo-Ukrainian War. United24 Media reported that the organization worked with secular and religious organizations as local distribution partners. In 2025, the Ukrainian Catholic University Foundation said Nova Ukraine became a strategic partner of the university’s bachelor’s program in robotics, supporting scholarships and laboratories; it also reported that CEO Erin E. McKee visited the university in December 2025.

In late 2025, Suspilne reported that Nova Ukraine financed the "Syla dvokh" ("Power of Two") rehabilitation retreat program in Poltava Oblast aimed at supporting veterans and their families.

=== Advocacy (Advocate) ===
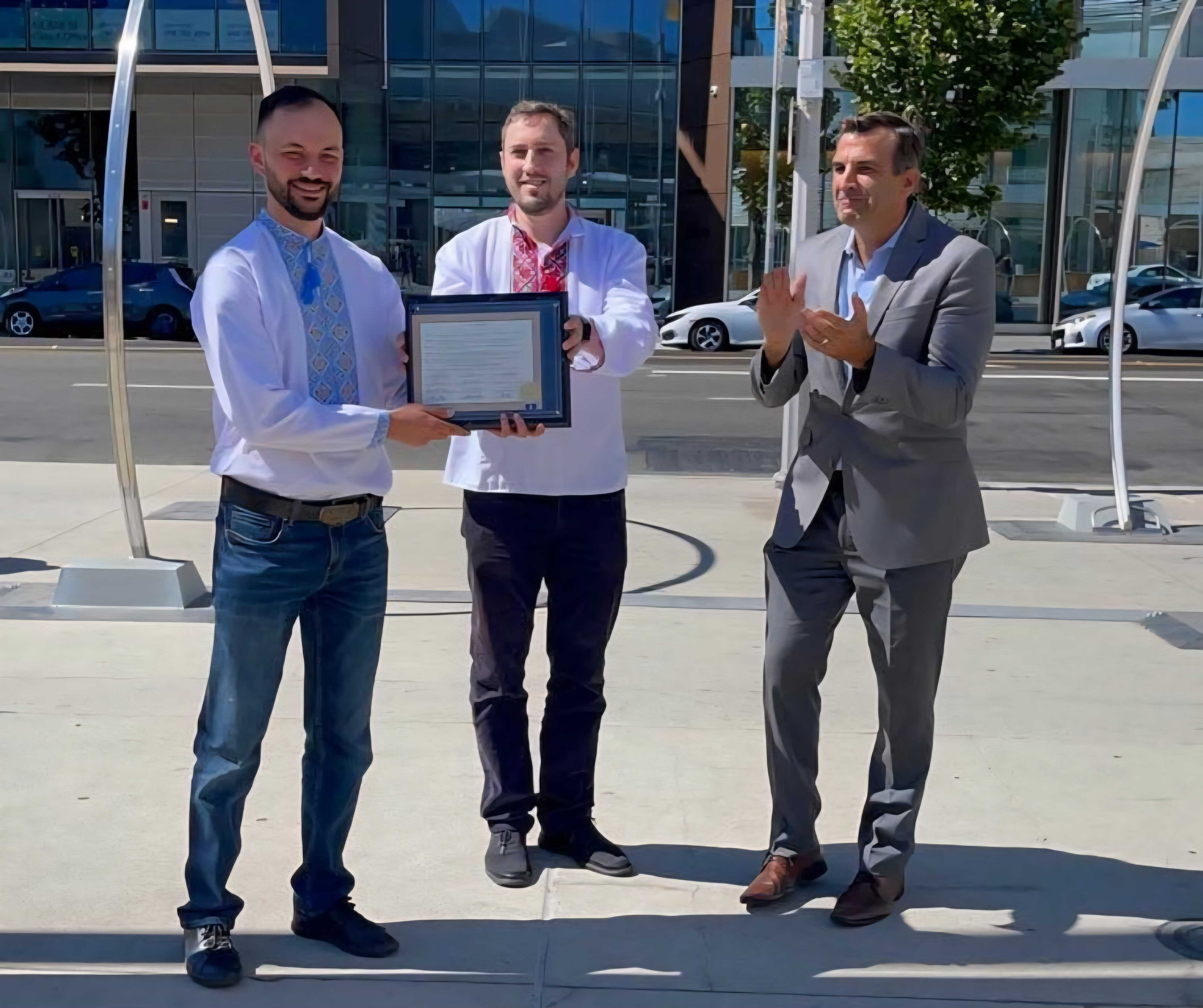
Board Members Korkuna (left) and Markov (middle) at the flag-raising ceremony with Mayor Sam Liccardo at the San Jose City Hall August 24, 2022.

In the weeks before Russia's full-scale invasion, Nova Ukraine organized street rallies in the San Francisco Bay Area to raise awareness of the threat and to mobilize the diaspora. After the invasion, Nova Ukraine continued street rallies, some of which drew attention to American companies still operating in Russia.

Nova Ukraine directors participated in flag-raising ceremonies at the San Francisco City Hall and San Jose City Hall dedicated to the Independence Day of Ukraine (in August) and marking anniversaries of Russian Invasion of Ukraine (in February), as well as Santa Clara City Council meetings and Santa Clara County events.

In 2022, Nova Ukraine became a founding member of the American Coalition for Ukraine to participate in diaspora advocacy networks that aim to influence public understanding and policy debates related to the war. The organization has participated in advocacy activities, including co-organizing Ukraine Action Summits and engaging with media. In 2023, alongside Razom and other partners, Nova Ukraine hosted a delegation of religious leaders from the All-Ukrainian Council of Churches and Religious Organizations (UCCRO) in Washington, D.C., to raise awareness about the impact of the Russian occupation on religious freedom. A 2025 profile described the organization's involvement in U.S.-based advocacy efforts, including paid media campaigns that focus on issues such as the abduction of Ukrainian children. In interviews, board members have argued that Nova Ukraine's efforts and coordinated diaspora advocacy added to congressional support for Ukraine-related aid bills.

In 2026, Suspilne reported that Nova Ukraine was among the U.S.-based civic and charitable organizations involved in organizing a rally at the Lincoln Memorial in Washington, D.C., marking the fourth anniversary of the full-scale invasion.

== Structure and governance ==
The Board of Directors, chaired by Nick Bilogorskiy, oversees Nova Ukraine's strategic direction and executive recruitment. The Board is supported by the Advisory Board and an executive leadership team comprising the Chief Executive Officer (CEO), Chief Financial Officer (CFO), Chief Operating Officer (COO), and Chief Development Officer (CDO), along with Vice Presidents and Director for Ukraine who report to the Board. Erin McKee has served as the organization's CEO since August 2025. The leadership also includes team leads, and supports a diverse volunteer base representing a range of cultural and professional backgrounds. The organization primarily conducts its official business in English, while also incorporating the Ukrainian language. Nova Ukraine provides aid both directly and through collaborations with hospitals, local volunteer groups, state services, local authorities, and Ukrainian manufacturing and distribution firms.

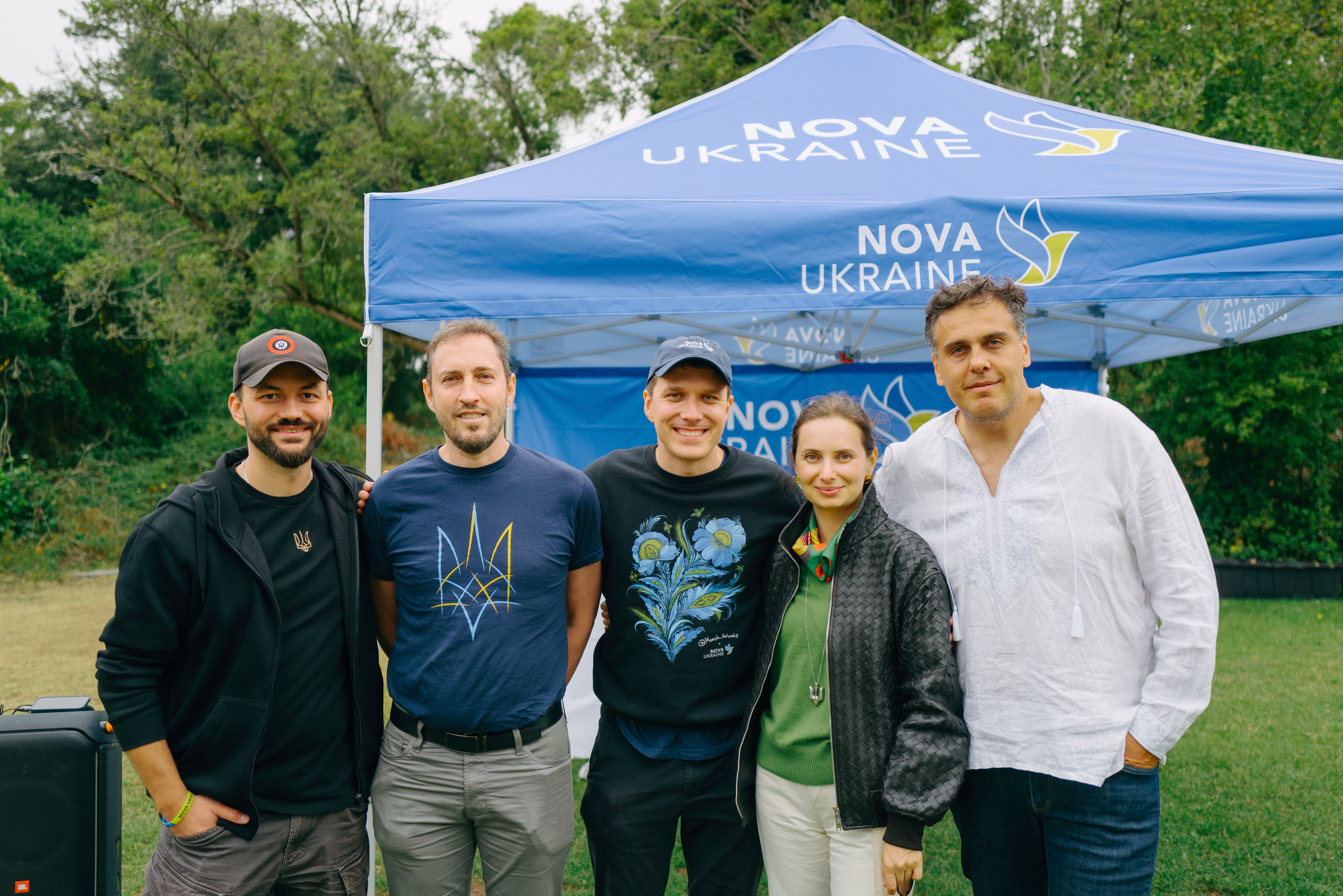
Californian members of the Nova Ukraine Board of Directors and Advisory Board at the 2025 Annual Picnic in San Francisco.

Since 2022, Nova Ukraine it has established volunteer chapters across eight U.S. states (California, Washington, Nevada, Utah, New York, Illinois, Texas) and the District of Columbia. It also opened offices in Ukraine. In 2022, Nova Ukraine increased aid and services, establishing a subsidiary office in Kyiv and expanding operational capabilities with reporting teams and warehouses in multiple Ukrainian cities. In 2022, the organization provided an estimated $55.5 million in humanitarian aid, including food, medical supplies, and other critical resources, for affected communities both within Ukraine and among refugees abroad.

== Financial performance ==
Financial data summary
Fiscal year ending Dec.	Contributions (Revenue)	Contributions as fraction of total revenue	Investment income	Other revenue	Total assets	Total liabilities	Notable expenses (Other salaries and wages)
2024	$41,180,404	98.6%	$428,552	$3,533	$27,804,425	$532,054	$490,908
2023	$31,261,335	99.6%	$135,360	$4,509	$16,826,932	$147,878	$114,000
2022	$75,171,152	100%	$24,969	$10,987	$19,008,324	$374,756	$29,000
2021	$365,627	100%	$0	$0	$151,012	$1	$0
2020	$363,158	100%	$0	$0	$79,884	$0	$0

== Awards and recognition ==
In March 2022, the National Philanthropic Trust profiled Nova Ukraine. In 2022 and 2023, Nova Ukraine’s co-founder Ostap Korkuna participated in recorded interviews as part of a Charity Navigator review, where he discussed the organization's operations and achievements. Charity Navigator gave Nova Ukraine an overall score of 100% and a four-star rating (most recent fiscal year shown: FY 2024). In 2025 GuideStar, a non-profit ranking platform managed by Candid, awarded the organization a Platinum Transparency Seal for its financial and operational transparency.

In 2014, the organization ranked second among U.S.-based Ukrainian nonprofit organizations in an annual reader survey by Ukrainian Chicago. During the full-scale invasion of Ukraine, Forbes Ukraine ranked Nova Ukraine fifth among fundraising leaders supporting Ukrainians in 2022. The organization’s healthcare programming was later recognized in June 2025, when Nova Ukraine received first place in the “Charity in Healthcare” category at the Charitable Ukraine 2024 awards. In August 2025, Focus magazine included Nova Ukraine among the 100 most impactful Ukrainians, ranking it as the fifth-highest charity organization.

Several individual honors have also been awarded to Nova Ukraine’s co-founders in connection with their leadership of the organization. In 2020, Nick Bilogorskiy was ranked 31st on Forbes Ukraine's list of “40 Global Ukrainians.” In 2022, Bilogorskiy received the Order of Merit 3rd class from President Volodymyr Zelensky, and in 2023 the same honor was awarded to co-founder Ostap Korkuna. In November 2025, Bilogorskiy was included in Ukrainska Pravda's annual “UP 100: Power of Influence” ranking, placing second in the Society category.

== Scrutiny and challenges ==
=== Aid restrictions ===
Nova Ukraine declined to provide lethal aid to active combatants because major corporate donation platforms require nonprofits to verify their aid does not support active combat. Internal discussions acknowledged the practical difficulty in distinguishing dual-use items like vehicles that serve both civilian and military purposes. Nova Ukraine focused on distributing emergency medical supplies to Ukraine, including tourniquets and first-aid kits for civilians and first responders. It also supported evacuation and provided help to wounded Ukrainian service members undergoing medical treatment.

=== Support for Ukrainian refugees in the United States ===
Following the 2022 invasion, Ukrainian refugees arrived at the United States–Mexico border in significant numbers, prompting volunteer networks to provide initial housing, transportation, and guidance until new arrivals were required to secure U.S. sponsors under the Uniting for Ukraine program. As federal pathways narrowed, organizations assisting refugees faced challenges maintaining support efforts and helping displaced Ukrainians establish longer-term stability. In Southern California, community initiatives provided temporary housing and access to basic services for newly arrived families. Independent reporting also noted broader difficulties for refugees seeking employment, housing, and community ties as federal programs for new entrants were scaled back.

=== San Jose's sister-city relationship with Ekaterinburg ===
In the spring of 2022, board chair Nick Bilogorskiy urged the San Jose City Council to terminate the city’s sister-city relationship with Ekaterinburg, arguing that maintaining the relationship was “shameful and disgusting” given Russia’s invasion of Ukraine. However, the San José City Council voted to retain the relationship while issuing a letter expressing peace and support for residents of Ekaterinburg.

=== Donor fatigue and recovery ===
Nick Bilogorskiy, co-chair of Nova Ukraine, stated that while donations had been strong at the outset of the war, contributions had “trickled down” about 70 days after the invasion began. By late 2023, Reuters described donor fatigue affecting Ukraine-related fundraising as the war continued.

=== Destroyed medical aid warehouse ===
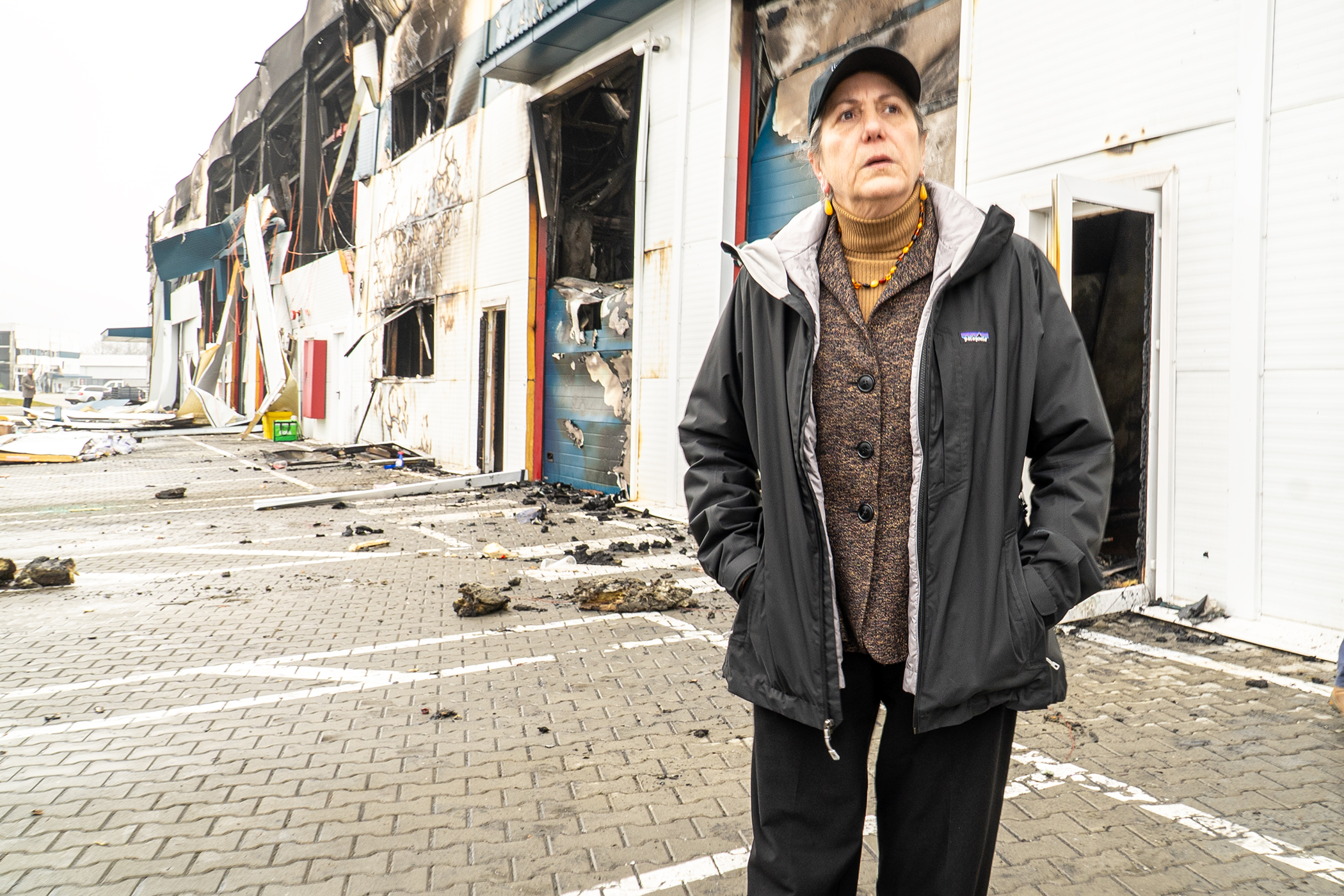
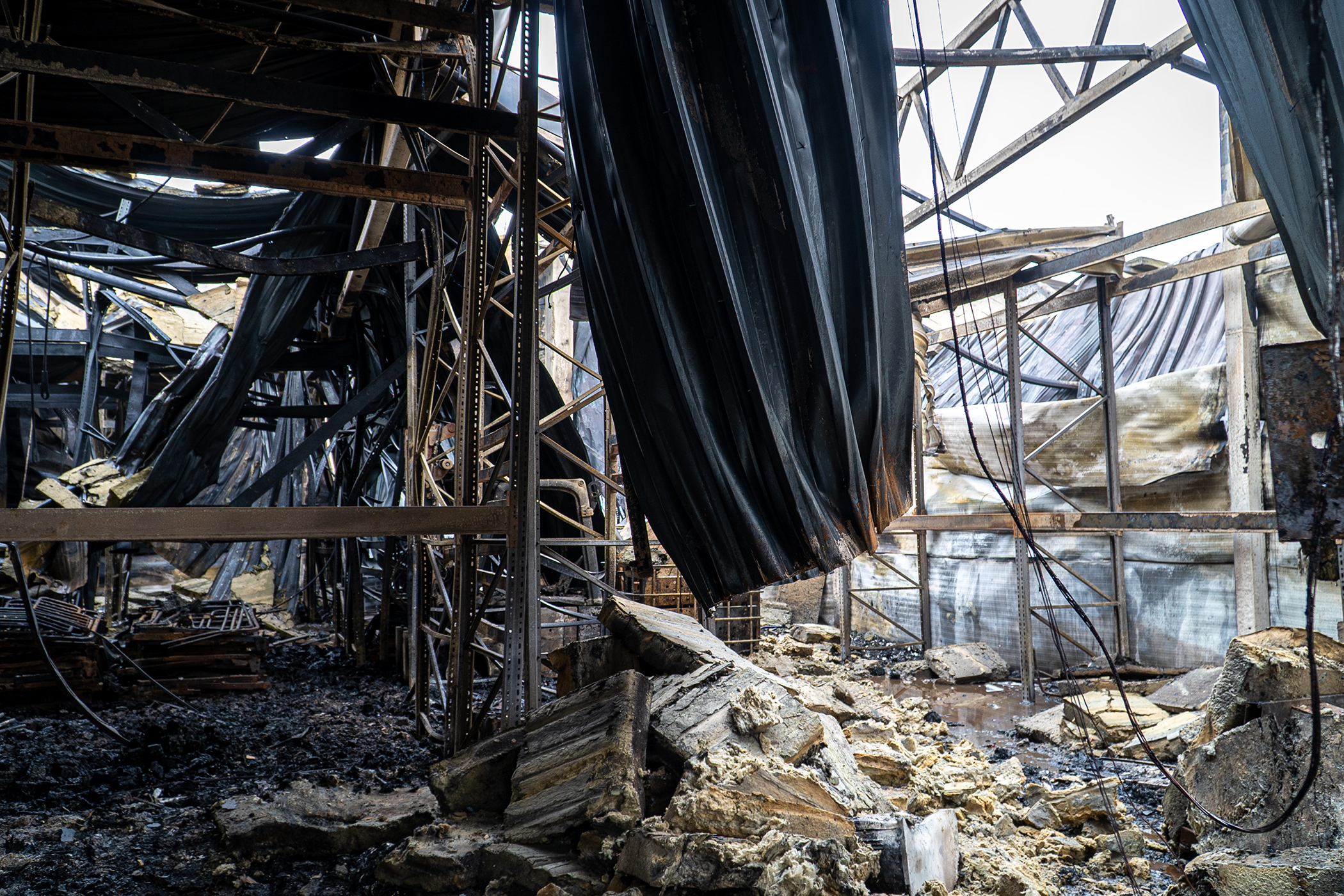
Erin McKee, CEO of Nova Ukraine, inspects remnants of Nova Ukraine medical-aid hub in Lviv that was destroyed on November 19, 2025.jpg

On 19 November 2025, a Russian strike destroyed a Nova Ukraine medical transit warehouse in Lviv; no staff were injured. The transit facility, which stored medical supplies and equipment intended to support more than 600 hospitals and clinics across Ukraine, was hit on 19 November 2025, resulting in the loss of significant humanitarian aid, though no Nova Ukraine personnel were reported injured. Representatives of the organization characterized the destruction as a "severe blow" to medical logistics and worked on efforts to redistribute and replace lost supplies to maintain ongoing support for healthcare facilities. United24 noted that multiple logistical hubs and warehouses in Ukraine have been struck during the war but the affected organizations continued operations by using redundant facilities.

== Scholarly perspectives ==
A 2024 article in the journal European Societies analyzes Nova Ukraine together with several other Ukrainian-American nonprofits as part of a network that constructs diasporic Ukrainian identity in the United States. It describes their role as developing narratives that focus on Ukrainian agency, democratic values and global security concerns, while mobilizing supporters to lobby Western institutions.
