= Nick Bilogorskiy =

Ukrainian American computer security expert and nonprofit founder (born 1981)

- Микола Олександрович Білогорський
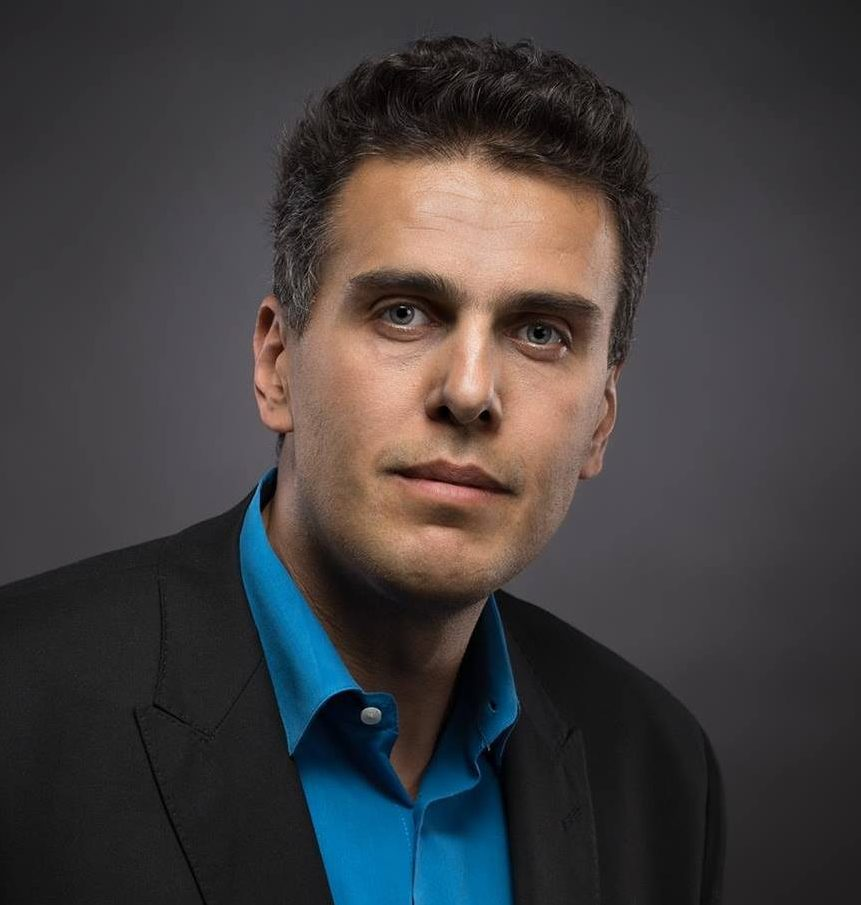
- Born: June 27, 1981 (age 45); Kharkiv, Ukraine
- Education: Simon Fraser University
- Occupations: computer security expert; startup founder; nonprofit founder
- Years active: 2010–present
- Title: Co-founder and chair of Nova Ukraine
- Awards: Order of Merit (Ukraine) 3rd degree

Nick O. Bilogorskiy (Ukrainian: Микола Олександрович Білогорський; Russian: Николай Александрович Белогорский; born on 27 June 1981 in Kharkiv) is a Ukrainian American cybersecurity expert, executive, entrepreneur, co-founder and chair of the Nova Ukraine nonprofit. In 2022, he received the Order of Merit (Ukraine) 3rd degree. In 2025, Ukrainska Pravda listed him #2 in the Society category of the “UP 100: Power of Influence” rankings.

== Education and career ==
=== Early life and education ===
Bilogorskiy was born to a high-school teacher father and university professor mother, who divorced when he was six. In a 2015 interview with Ukrainian public broadcaster Suspilne TV, he recalled that his mother immigrated to Canada when he was 16 and that he subsequently joined her there. Bilogorskiy holds a B.S. degree in Computer Science from Simon Fraser University in Burnaby, BC.

=== Career in technology ===
Bilogorskiy joined Facebook in 2010 as the company's first antivirus analyst, tasked with combating the Koobface virus, which spread through Facebook messages and infected millions of users. He worked closely with the company's Chief Security Officer and collaborated with law enforcement agencies to identify the virus creators, who were later traced to Saint Petersburg, Russia. After Facebook, Bilogorskiy co-founded Cyphort, a cybersecurity startup that developed second-generation antivirus products using behavioral analysis rather than signature-based detection. Cyphort's clients included Netflix and Yelp. The company was acquired by Juniper Networks in 2017. In May 2019, Bilogorskiy joined Google as a director of Trust and Safety and worked at Google until 2023. He presented his work on computer security at the RSA Conference in 2018 and 2019.

=== Venture capital career ===
In early 2024, Bilogorskiy co-founded Dnipro.VC, a venture capital partnership based in Palo Alto, California that invests in early-stage companies developing artificial intelligence and cybersecurity technologies. The fund focuses on startups founded or co-founded by Ukrainian entrepreneurs. In a March 2025 interview, Bilogorskiy recommended that Ukrainian startups show evidence of prior funding success when approaching international investors, reflecting his approach to post-war economic development.

== Advocacy and fundraising for Ukraine ==
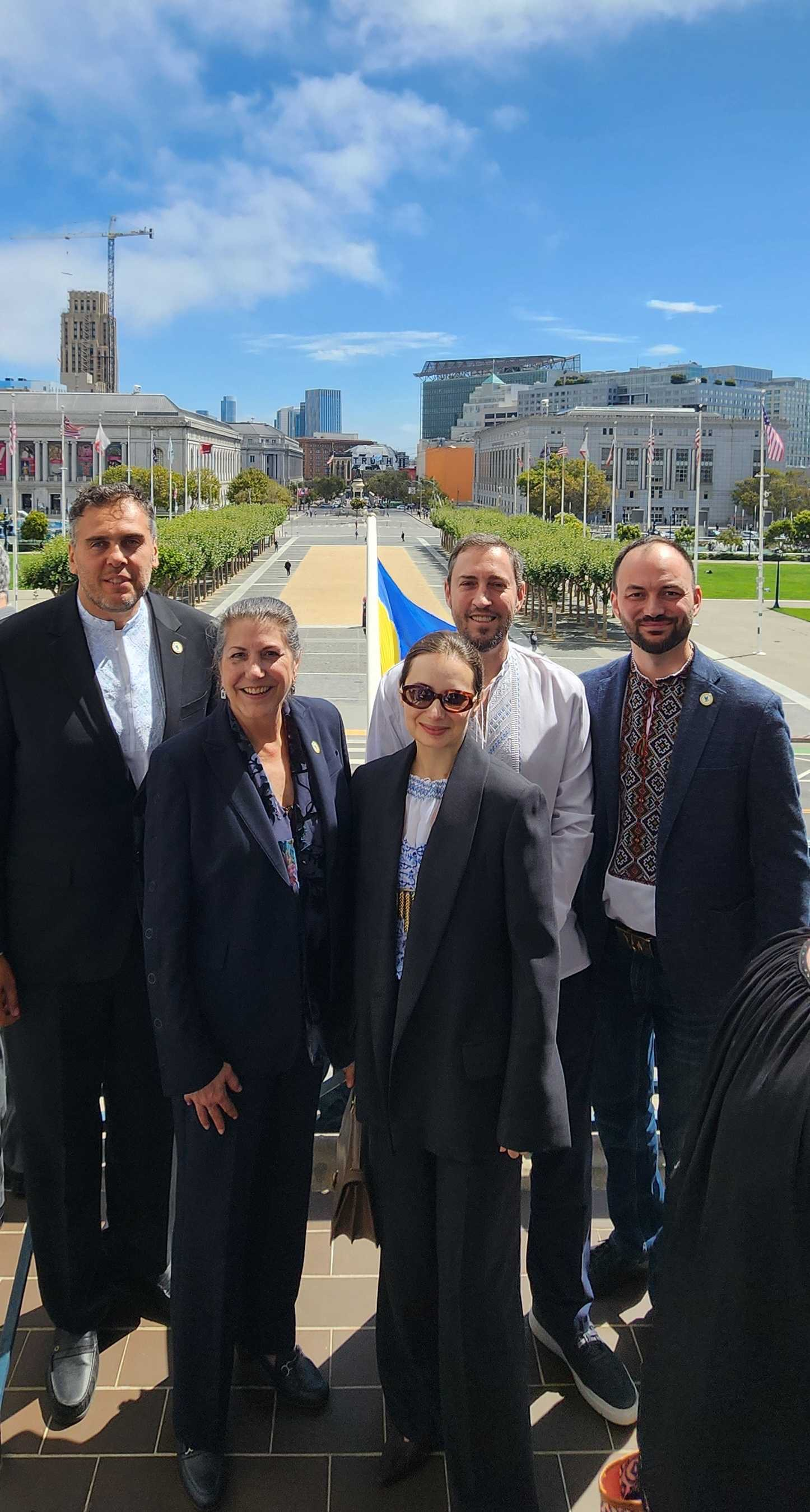
Nova Ukraine representatives at the Ukrainian flag raising ceremony at San Francisco City Hall on August 24, 2025

In 2014 after the Annexation of Crimea by the Russian Federation Bilogorskiy co-founded Maydan SF to organize the Ukrainian diaspora in the San Francisco Bay Area and raise awareness about the situation in Ukraine. Later in 2014 he co-founded Nova Ukraine, a 501(c)(3) organization (nonprofit) that raised funds for Ukraine and ran projects there to help vulnerable populations, internally displaced people and wounded soldiers who needed treatment. Bilogorskiy and Nova Ukraine also organized cultural events for the Ukrainian community in the SF Bay Area. Since early February 2022 and after the Russian invasion of Ukraine, Bilogorskiy and Nova Ukraine organized street rallies to support Ukraine then performed fundraising and humanitarian aid for Ukraine. Nova Ukraine’s IRS Form 990 shows $147 million raised between 2022 and 2024. The Focus magazine reported in 2025 that since 2022 Nova Ukraine has provided humanitarian aid worth over $130 million to assist people of Ukraine with food, water, medicine, and other critical supplies.

== Awards and distinctions ==
Bilogorskiy's work in both cybersecurity and humanitarian efforts has garnered recognition from multiple organizations. In 2020, Forbes Ukraine ranked him 31st on their "40 Global Ukrainians" list, which recognizes Ukrainian professionals making an impact internationally. His humanitarian work through Nova Ukraine received official recognition from the Ukrainian government in 2022, when President Volodymyr Zelenskyy awarded him the Order of Merit 3rd degree. The organization itself was later recognized by Focus magazine in 2025, which ranked Nova Ukraine as the fifth most impactful volunteer organization among 100 influential Ukrainians. In November 2025, Ukrainska Pravda included Bilogorskiy in their annual "UP 100: Power of Influence" ranking, placing him second in the Society category. The ranking highlights Ukrainians whose work is considered influential in shaping the country's future.

== Controversies ==
In the Spring of 2022, after Russia’s invasion of Ukraine Bilogorskiy publicly urged the San Jose City Council to terminate the city’s sister-city relationship with Ekaterinburg, Russia, arguing that maintaining the relationship was inappropriate given Russian atrocities in Ukraine. Local media reported Bilogorskiy describing the continued tie as “shameful and disgusting,” part of broader debates among local officials and community members about displays of solidarity with Ukraine. Following public debate, the San José City Council voted to retain the relationship but issue a letter expressing peace and support for residents of Ekaterinburg.
