= Ostap Korkuna =

Ukrainian non-profit founder (born 1987)

- Остап Коркуна
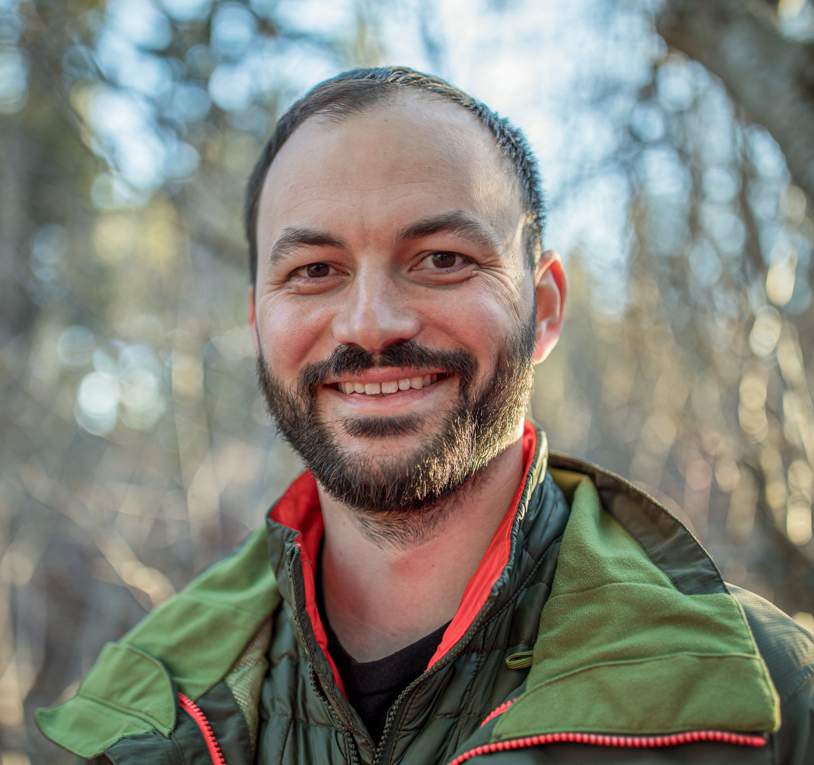
- Born: September 26, 1987 (age 38); Lviv, Ukraine
- Education: Lviv National University, Stanford University
- Occupations: software company executive; nonprofit co-chair
- Known for: Nova Ukraine
- Awards: International Collegiate Programming Contest 2008 gold medal, Order of Merit 3rd class

Ostap Korkuna (Ukrainian: Остап Коркуна; born 26 September 1987 in Lviv) is a Ukrainian American software engineer and non-profit leader. He won a gold medal at the ACM International Collegiate Programming Contest, as a member of the Lviv National University team in 2008, and later held engineering roles in the United States. Korkuna is a co-founder of Nova Ukraine, a U.S.-based nonprofit organization that supports humanitarian programs in Ukraine, and NeoLens, a technology startup founded at Stanford University that develops tools for field diagnostics and equipment repair. In 2023 he received the Order of Merit of Ukraine, 3rd class, in recognition of his leadership and contributions to humanitarian assistance.

== Education and career ==
=== Undergraduate degree and programming contests ===
Korkuna holds a master's degree in Informatics from Lviv National University in Ukraine. While at university, he took part in competitive programming contests. He was a member of the team representing Lviv National University at the 2008 International Collegiate Programming Contest World Finals. The team placed fourth overall and was awarded gold medals along with the other top four teams. As a solo competitor, he placed 13th in the 2009 Topcoder Open Algorithm Competition.

=== Engineering roles in the US ===
After Korkuna's programming contest results, he was recruited to work at Facebook, and moved to California to work in engineering roles. Until 2024, he worked as a director of engineering at People.ai, a revenue intelligence software startup. Korkuna has been named as an inventor on several United States patents assigned to People.ai that describe methods for classifying electronic activities and associating them with customer records in enterprise software systems. These patents describe approaches to linking communication records—such as emails, calendar entries, or call logs—with organizational datasets used in customer-relationship and revenue-intelligence platforms.

=== Stanford MBA and NeoLens ===
In Summer 2025, Korkuna completed his Master of Science in Management at the Stanford Graduate School of Business, enhancing his technical background with formal management education. Ostap Korkuna is the co-founder and CTO of NeoLens, a startup participating in Stanford’s Hacking for Defense program, focused on developing AI-assisted diagnostic tools for field mechanics, with early deployments supporting Ukrainian forces.

== Humanitarian work and advocacy ==
During the 2014 Revolution of Dignity, Korkuna helped organize the Ukrainian community in the San Francisco Bay area as a local branch of Euromaydan to show solidarity with Ukraine through street rallies. He co-founded Nova Ukraine in 2014, and has led the organization until 2024, contributing to fundraising, recruitment and media relations. In 2018 Korkuna led a rally in San Francisco to support Ukrainian sailors captured by Russia in the Kerch Strait incident. Starting weeks before the Russian invasion of Ukraine in February 2022, he led street rallies in San Francisco to raise awareness about the situation in Ukraine.

In Summer 2022, at a public discussion event at the Commonwealth Club of California, Korkuna outlined how Nova Ukraine helped Ukrainian refugees in Mexico and in the US with shelter, food, basic necessities, and communications, while advocating for additional aid. According to the Focus magazine, during Korkuna's leadership Nova Ukraine raised over a hundred million dollars for humanitarian aid for Ukraine and delivered significant amounts of aid since 2022.

== Awards and distinctions ==
In 2023, Ukrainian President Volodymyr Zelensky recognized Korkuna's contributions as the co-founder and co-chair of Nova Ukraine with the Order of Merit 3rd class. In August 2025, the Focus magazine included Nova Ukraine among 100 "most impactful Ukrainians" as the #5 volunteer organization.
