= Razom =

U.S.-based Ukrainian civil society organization

Razom for Ukraine
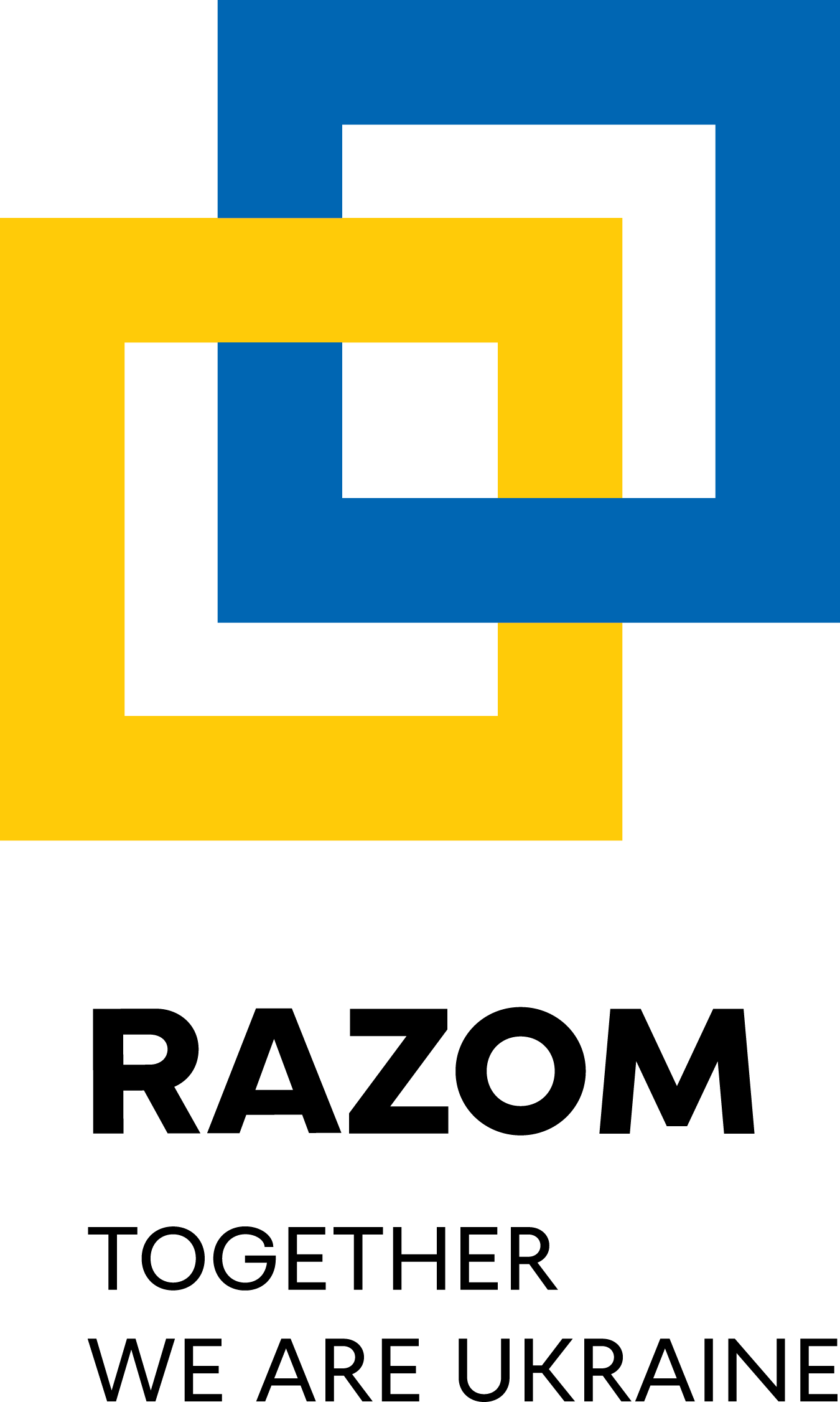
- Formation: January 2014; 12 years ago
- Type: U.S. 501(c)(3) organization charitable organization
- Location: Kyiv, Lviv, New York City, Washington, D.C.
- Staff: 100+ in the U.S. and Ukraine
- Website: razomforukraine.org

Razom for Ukraine (Ukrainian: Разом, lit. 'Together') is a U.S.-based 501(c)(3) organization dedicated to "unlocking the potential of Ukraine". Razom, is dedicated to upholding the principles of the Revolution of Dignity and promoting the building of a secure, prosperous, and democratic Ukraine. Forbes Ukraine declared Razom one of the top 10 nonprofit organizations in Ukraine for 2023. In August 2025, Focus magazine included Razom among 100 'most impactful Ukrainians' as the #6 volunteer organization.

Since Russia’s full-scale invasion in 2022, Razom has significantly expanded its humanitarian aid efforts to support affected Ukrainians. Their work includes delivering essential medical supplies, food, and shelter to those in need, as well as supporting local Ukrainian humanitarian organizations. As of December 2024, Razom has delivered approximately $139 million in humanitarian aid to Ukraine.

Razom advocates internationally for Ukraine, working with U.S. policymakers and media to raise awareness of the humanitarian crisis and the urgent need for sustained global support.

== Overview ==
Razom for Ukraine operates through five core programs:

- Razom Heroes focuses on providing critical medical supplies, equipment, and training to first responders on Ukraine's front lines. This includes delivering essential items like tourniquets and trauma kits to those on the front lines, as well as supporting the development of advanced medical training programs for Ukrainian medical personnel.
- Razom Health aims to strengthen Ukraine's healthcare system by providing essential medical equipment, supporting the training of healthcare workers, and improving access to quality healthcare for all Ukrainians. This includes delivering supplies to hospitals and clinics across the country, supporting training in advanced medical techniques, and working to improve the overall quality of healthcare services.
- Razom Relief provides direct humanitarian aid to vulnerable Ukrainian populations affected by the war. This includes delivering essential food, water, shelter, and other basic necessities to those in need by supporting local Ukrainian organizations.
- Razom Advocacy focuses on independently advocating for Ukraine's interests on the international stage. This includes working with policymakers and the media to raise awareness about the ongoing humanitarian crisis in Ukraine and the need for continued international support for Ukraine's defense and recovery efforts.
- Razom Connect celebrates and promotes Ukrainian culture, connecting Ukrainians with the global community. This includes supporting cultural exchange programs, organizing events to showcase Ukrainian art and music, and fostering connections between Ukrainian communities around the world.

These five programs work together to provide comprehensive support to Ukraine and its people, addressing the humanitarian needs created by the Russian war against Ukraine, while also supporting Ukraine's long-term recovery and development.

== Leadership ==
As of December 2024, the Board of Directors comprised Olya Yarychkivska, Maria Genkin, Olena Nyzhnykevych, Nonna Tsiganok, Max Burtsev, and Yulia Paslavska. Razom's key leaders included Dora Chomiak (CEO), Oksana Falenchuk (Chief Financial Officer), Zoe Ripecky (Chief Operating Officer), and Anastasia Rab (Chief Advancement Officer). In Ukraine, Evelina Kurilets is the Executive Director of Razom dlia Ukrainy, the Razom affiliate in Ukraine, and Vitalii Svichynsky serves as Operations Director. Greg Kulchyckyj is Chief of Staff.

== Recognition ==
In November 2023, at their annual conference and gala in Chicago, the non-governmental humanitarian organization MedGlobal presented Razom with its Humanitarian Award. In April 2023, Razom was awarded the 2023 Bob Freeman Humanitarian Award by MedShare, a global humanitarian aid organization dedicated to improving the quality of life of people, communities and the planet by reallocating surplus medical supplies and biomedical equipment. During Ukrainian President Volodymyr Zelenskyy's visit to Washington, D.C., in September 2023, he awarded Razom the Order for Merit, Class III. For Razom's work in the health sector, Time Magazine recognized Razom CEO Dora Chomiak as one of the Top 100 Most Influential People in Health in 2024.

In 2025, Razom for Ukraine was ranked sixth in Focus’s «Рейтинг найвпливовіших українців 2025: ТОП-100», highlighting its continued delivery of radio-communication systems, mobile medical stabilization units and management training for Ukrainian medical and defense personnel.

== Razom Programs ==
=== Razom Heroes ===
In 2022, Razom Heroes delivered over 500 tons of life-saving supplies totaling $40 million USD. Razom packed and distributed over 90,000 first aid kits, 2,000 medical backpacks, and 50,000 tourniquets to frontline medical personnel. Razom sourced and supplied 69 cars for medics to use as ambulances. Throughout 2022, Razom heroes provided 350 wood stoves, 250 generators, and over 100 power stations to keep Ukrainians warm and connected.

As of 2024, key areas of support include the provision of essential equipment such as over 6,000 handheld radios for communication and 190 vehicles, including five "Unimog" all-terrain ambulances and six armored Toyota L200s for specialized casualty evacuation. Recognizing the importance of basic necessities, the program has also delivered mobile laundry and shower units, manufactured locally, to improve hygiene and comfort for Ukraine's defenders. Nearly 36,000 "Kosmichnyj Kharch" meals (high-calorie, ready-to-eat meals designed in collaboration with Ukrainian restaurant company FEST) have been distributed to provide nourishment.

=== Razom Health ===
Razom Health addresses the urgent needs of Ukrainian hospitals and healthcare facilities by procuring and delivering essential medical supplies, equipment, and pharmaceuticals. Since 2022, this includes:

- Collecting and Distributing In-Kind Donations: 35 shipments of donated medical supplies valued at over $41 million were delivered to 308 medical institutions in 2023, primarily in regions like Kharkiv, Mykolaiv, Dnipro, Ivano-Frankivsk, and Lviv.
- Ensuring Reliable Power and Heating: Over 110 essential heaters and generators were dispatched and installed in 25 Ukrainian hospitals to maintain critical medical services during power outages and harsh winter conditions.
- Improving Frontline Medical Care: The POCUS (Point-of-Care Ultrasound) initiative equips medical professionals with portable ultrasound devices, enabling rapid diagnosis and treatment of life-threatening injuries in challenging field conditions. Hundreds of Butterfly iQ devices and tablets were provided to trained healthcare professionals and military personnel.
- Addressing Mental Health and Psychosocial Support (MHPSS) Needs: The war has had a profound impact on the mental health of the Ukrainian population. "Razom with You" provides free MHPSS services at six centers across Ukraine, offering vital support to civilians impacted by the war, including women, children, IDPs, families of military personnel, and individuals experiencing trauma, grief, and anxiety. Services include individual and group therapy, trauma-informed care, and support for children and adolescents.
- Conducting free training programs in collaboration with partner organizations like MedGlobal, CMA, FOCUS POCUS, and ELLING to ensure effective utilization of these devices.

Razom Health also works to strengthen Ukraine's healthcare system. The Co-Pilot Project focuses on enhancing surgical expertise within Ukraine by facilitating medical missions to Ukraine. 14 medical missions were conducted in 2023, deploying 112 international healthcare professionals (neurosurgeons, reconstructive surgeons, orthopedic surgeons) to provide critical care and training to Ukrainian doctors. The Co-Pilot Project also helps Ukrainian surgeons participate in specialized observership programs at leading academic hospitals in the United States, gaining valuable experience and skills.

=== Razom Relief ===
Razom prioritizes partnerships with local groups operating within Ukraine. This approach aims to empower local communities to lead humanitarian and recovery efforts, focusing aid on frontline and liberated areas in regions like Kharkiv, Kherson, and Zaporizhzhia. In 2023, Razom distributed over $3.1 million in grants and executed projects reaching approximately 330,000 people. This support encompassed a wide range of initiatives, including immediate relief for frontline communities, winterization assistance, support for liberated communities, aid for victims of the destruction of the Kakhovka dam, and critical support for children, including access to education, summer camps, and psychological services.

Beyond direct aid, Razom works to strengthen the capacity of Ukrainian NGOs. The "Stronger Together" program provides training and mentorship to local organizations, enhancing their ability to fundraise, strategize, and manage their operations effectively. This focus on civil society development ensures long-term sustainability and resilience within the Ukrainian humanitarian sector.

Razom Relief also emphasizes the importance of education for Ukrainian children. Through initiatives like the Razom Ticket project, the organization supports participation in international competitions, provides access to specialized academic programs, and assists gifted students in pursuing their educational goals. These efforts aim to nurture future generations of Ukrainian leaders and contribute to the long-term recovery and development of the country.

=== Razom Advocacy ===
Razom Advocacy is dedicated to advancing policy initiatives that support Ukrainian victory against Russia's invasion. This multifaceted program aims to foster a deeper understanding of Russia's invasion within the United States and mobilize public and political support for Ukraine.

Razom Advocacy operates in Washington, D.C., through two primary avenues: government affairs and public engagement.

- The government affairs team actively engages with the Executive Branch, Congress, and other key decision-making bodies to advocate for policies that strengthen Ukraine's defense capabilities and advance its strategic interests. This includes advocating for increased military and humanitarian aid, pushing for stricter sanctions against Russia, and advocating for security guarantees for Ukraine through membership in NATO.
- The public engagement team focuses on mobilizing support for Ukraine across the United States. This involves connecting with and activating constituents, fostering partnerships with organizations across the country, and leveraging social media and press outreach to amplify pro-Ukrainian voices and build a strong public consensus in support of Ukraine.

Razom Advocacy also conducts research and analysis on key policy issues related to the war in Ukraine. This includes examining the effectiveness of existing aid packages, analyzing the impact of sanctions on the Russian economy, and assessing the evolving security situation on the ground. These analyses inform policy recommendations and advocacy strategies, ensuring that Razom Advocacy's efforts are data-driven and strategically focused.

On March 5, 2022, Razom co-organized a press conference in front of the White House to launch the American Coalition for Ukraine (ACU), an advocacy alliance of over 100 U.S.-based organizations. The ACU organizes the biannual Ukraine Action Summit, an advocacy event bringing together hundreds of delegates from across the U.S. to advocate for continued support of Ukraine. Held twice a year in Washington, D.C., these summits provide a platform for attendees to meet with their elected officials, learn from experts on Ukrainian affairs, and network with other supporters.

In October 2023, Razom worked with Nova Ukraine, Houston for Ukraine, and MedGlobal to host a delegation of religious leaders from the Ukrainian Council of Churches and Religious Organizations (UCCRO) for advocacy programming in Washington, D.C. and Houston, Texas. The delegation of Ukrainian clergy — Protestant, Catholic, Orthodox, Jewish, Muslim — came to Washington to impress upon policymakers the threat that Russia's invasion of their country poses for religious freedom in a nation where pluralism has thrived, following the UNESCO and Institute for Religious Freedom reports about the damaged religious sites and threats to religious leaders.

=== Razom Connect ===
Razom Connect is a multifaceted program dedicated to fostering cultural exchange and understanding between Ukraine and the global community. It encompasses a range of initiatives, including Razom Culture, Razom Cinema, Razom Literature, and Ukraine on Campus, that provide platforms for showcasing Ukrainian art, literature, and film to international audiences.

In 2023, Razom Connect organized several significant events, including the inaugural Ukrainian Cultural Festival in New York City. This festival, co-presented with Yara Arts and the Shevchenko Scientific Society, featured a diverse program of events celebrating Ukrainian literature, music, and cinema.

Razom Connect actively supports the promotion of Ukrainian cinema internationally. This includes providing travel grants to Ukrainian filmmakers to attend the Oscars, where the documentary "A House Made of Splinters" was nominated for Best Documentary. Razom also collaborated with renowned film festivals such as Sundance, Tribeca, and the Human Rights Watch Film Festival to amplify the visibility of Ukrainian films. Additionally, the program has supported the theatrical release of several Ukrainian films in the United States, including "20 Days in Mariupol" and "Klych," expanding their reach to audiences across the country.

== History ==
Razom was founded in early 2014, emerging from grassroots Ukrainian activism that began in late 2013. Community members in New York City and Washington, D.C. organized demonstrations to support the Ukrainian Ukrainian Revolution of Dignity, which turned into a fight against then-President of Ukraine Viktor Yanukovych. The main goal of such demonstrations was to bring the Obama administration's attention to the events taking place in Ukraine.

In January 2014, a Board of Directors established and Razom registered as a nonprofit incorporated entity. That same year, Razom commissioned the legal report "Crisis in Ukraine: Its Legal Dimensions," prepared by a team of students of NYU School of Law. The report outlined legal conclusions on the Annexation of Crimea by the Russian Federation, the Budapest Memorandum on international security guarantees, and the human rights and humanitarian law at issue. The Report also covered the right of secession, crimes of aggression, critical energy security issues, sanctions imposed on Russia; and relevant military law.

In 2014, Razom raised $136,159.94 in emergency support of protestors in the Revolution of Dignity. After Russia invaded Crimea and Ukraine's east, Razom assembled and shipped 250 boxes of toys, clothing, and supplies to families of the fallen and injured, refugee centers, orphanages, and vetted charities.

On August 4, 2015, Razom held its first Razom IT event to support the growth of an engaged middle class in Ukraine through its booming tech sector. In December 2015, Razom organized a U.N. event presenting its second legal report on human rights violations in occupied Crimea. In 2016, Razom's affiliate in Ukraine was granted nonprofit status. In 2017, the Razom Co-Pilot Project was launched.

In 2025, Razom was designated as an undesirable organization in Russia.

== See also ==
- Nova Ukraine – U.S. nonprofit supporting Ukraine
- United24 – Ukrainian government-run fundraising platform
- Come Back Alive – Ukrainian nonprofit organization supporting the Ukrainian armed forces
- Revolution of Dignity – 2014 revolution in Ukraine
- American Coalition for Ukraine – Coalition of organizations
- Harry F. Sinclair House - New York City mansion, home of the Ukrainian Institute of America
