= All-Ukrainian Council of Churches and Religious Organizations =

Council of Churches in Ukraine

- Всеукраїнська Рада Церков і релігійних організацій
- Abbreviation: AUCCRO, UCCRO
- Formation: 1996
- Type: Interfaith council
- Region served: Ukraine
- Members: 15 religious communities and 1 inter-church organization: Orthodox Church of Ukraine; Ukrainian Orthodox Church (Moscow Patriarchate); Catholic Church in Ukraine (including Latin and Ukrainian Greek Catholics); All-Ukrainian Union of the Churches of Evangelical Christians-Baptists; Ukrainian Pentecostal Church; Seventh-day Adventist Church in Ukraine; Ukrainian Christian Evangelical Church; Ukrainian Evangelical Church; Ukrainian Lutheran Church; Sub-Carpathian Reformed Church; German Evangelical Lutheran Church of Ukraine; Ukrainian Diocese of Armenian Apostolic Church; Union of Jewish Religious Organizations of Ukraine; Religious Administration of Muslims of Ukraine; Ukrainian Bible Society
- Website: https://vrciro.org.ua/en

The All-Ukrainian Council of Churches and Religious Organizations (Ukrainian: Всеукраїнська Рада Церков і релігійних організацій, romanized: Vseukrainska Rada Tserkov i relihiinykh orhanizatsii, AUCCRO or UCCRO) is an association of major religious organizations in Ukraine. Established in 1996, the Council serves as a platform for non-ecclesiastical interfaith dialogue, coordination of mutual activities, and engagement with government authorities. It aims to promote religious freedom and social harmony across Ukraine.

== History ==
The All-Ukrainian Council of Churches and Religious Organizations (UCCRO) was established in December 1996 at the initiative of then-President Leonid Kuchma as part of efforts to unify diverse religious communities in Ukraine and coordinate interchurch dialogue. This founding marked an important step in the post-Soviet religious landscape, which was characterized by increasing religious pluralism and the need to reconcile interfaith tensions that had been widespread during the early 1990s. According to independent analyses, interfaith councils such as UCCRO played a crucial role in reducing the number of towns affected by religious disputes—from over a thousand in the 1990s to about a hundred by 2003—with no reported violent religious conflicts after 2002. This reflects UCCRO's effectiveness in fostering interfaith peace and smoothing church-state relations in Ukraine.

The Council's founding also corresponded with significant changes in Ukraine's church-state relations following the country's independence in 1991, when new democratic principles introduced freedoms of conscience and increased religious pluralism. UCCRO became a key civil society actor that engaged with government bodies on legal and social matters concerning religion. It provided a unified voice for religious communities on national issues such as supporting Ukraine's sovereignty and promoting social cohesion, while opposing attempts at national or religious division.

In the broader religious environment of Ukraine during the 1990s and early 2000s, the country experienced a rapid shift from a predominantly Orthodox Christian demographic towards a multi-confessional society. UCCRO was a leading example of emergent interfaith institutions, reflecting the growing importance of religious organizations in supporting democratic development and civil society in Ukraine.

Since 2014 and intensifying after 2022 with the full-scale Russian invasion of Ukraine, UCCRO's role increasingly intersected with national security concerns. Religion has become a key component of Ukrainian national identity and security policy. This includes support for the establishment of the autocephalous Orthodox Church of Ukraine and regulatory measures concerning the Ukrainian Orthodox Church affiliated with the Moscow Patriarchate. These developments illustrate the evolving and complex relationship between church, state, and national sovereignty in the context of ongoing geopolitical conflict.

Since its establishment, UCCRO has grown to include 15 churches and religious organizations—including the largest Orthodox, Catholic, Protestant, Jewish, and Muslim communities—and an inter-church entity. The Council’s history illustrate UCCRO’s significance as an institution that has contributed to the peaceful pluralization of Ukrainian religious life, promoted dialogue among diverse confessions, and acted as a bridge in church-state relations through times of profound political and social change.

== Functions and activities ==
UCCRO coordinates inter-church relations, protects religious liberty, and acts as a consultative body to Ukrainian authorities. It issues joint statements on matters of religious freedom, interfaith solidarity, and peace initiatives. It also promotes the role of churches and religious organizations in supporting democratic reforms, civil society development, humanitarian assistance, and peace-building—both domestically and in international forums.

During emergencies, such as Russia's full-scale invasion in 2022, the Council advocated for the protection of human rights, condemned violence, called for humanitarian corridors, and urged global religious solidarity with Ukraine.

The Council has issued statements condemning violence, defending religious freedom, and calling for ecumenical action in times of crisis. Its appeals often address issues such as religious persecution, support for Ukrainian families, and humanitarian advocacy for war victims.

== Government relations ==
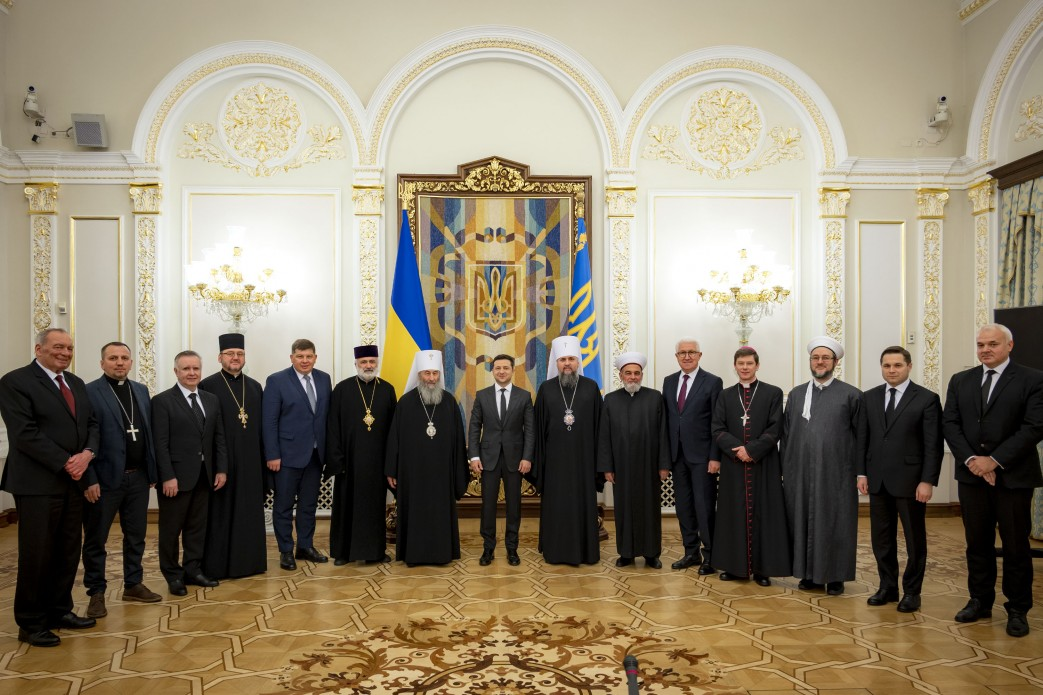
Members of the Council during a meeting with President Volodymyr Zelenskyy on December 17, 2021

The Council maintains open communication with the President, Parliament, and government ministries of Ukraine. It frequently participates in consultations about freedom of conscience, legislation dealing with religion, social policy, and support for families. On 22 April 2025, a UCCRO delegation met with President Volodymyr Zelenskyy to discuss spiritual support for military personnel, demographic challenges, international advocacy, and the development of military chaplaincy in Ukraine.

== International engagement ==
UCCRO representatives regularly engage with interfaith organizations and foreign diplomats, advocating for Ukraine's interests during conflict and promoting peace efforts. These visits highlight UCCRO’s efforts to stimulate international support through dialogue with foreign governments, religious communities, and civil society organizations in response to the ongoing conflict in Ukraine.

In 2023, UCCRO conducted a significant advocacy visit to the United States, supported by the U.S. nonprofits Razom and Nova Ukraine. The delegation participated in meetings and advocacy events in Washington, D.C., and Houston, Texas, engaging with U.S. government officials, religious leaders, and civic organizations. They highlighted Russian aggression’s impact on religious freedom in Ukraine and called for increased humanitarian and diplomatic support.

In May 2024, a delegation from the All-Ukrainian Council of Churches and Religious Organizations (UCCRO) conducted an advocacy visit to Brazil, holding meetings with Christian churches, government officials, and parliamentarians in São Paulo, Rio de Janeiro, Curitiba, and Brasília. The delegation shared information about the Russian military aggression against Ukraine and sought to expand cooperation with Brazilian churches, foster humanitarian support, and advocate for global solidarity with Ukraine amidst the ongoing conflict.

In 2025, its delegation attended international conferences and interfaith forums in Denmark and the United States, promoting solidarity with Ukrainian society and advancing the cause of just peace.

== See also ==
- Religion in Ukraine
- Freedom of religion in Ukraine
