= Ukrainian Museum =

Museum in Manhattan, New York

Coordinates: 40°43′40″N 73°59′23″W

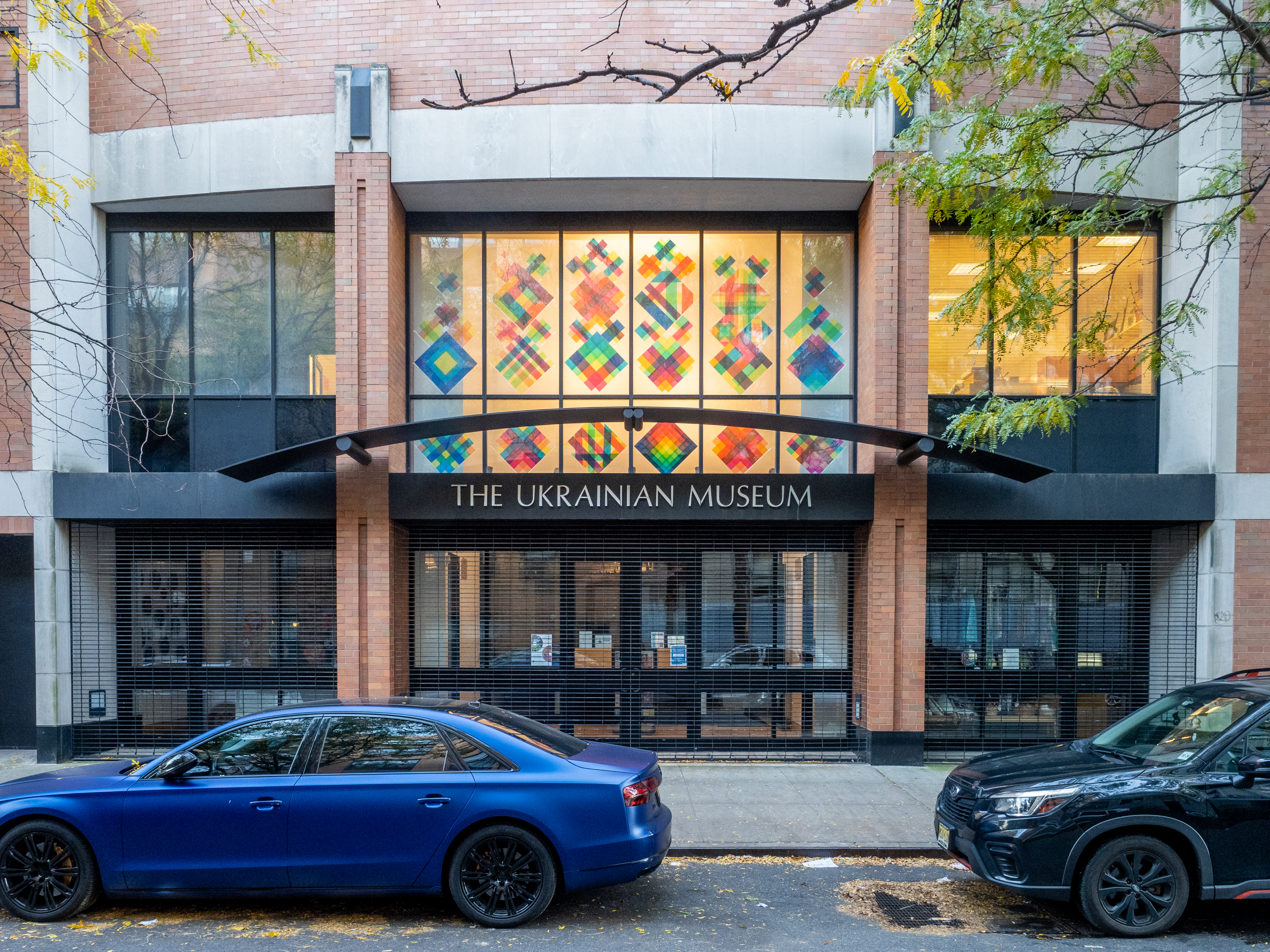
- Museum exterior (2021)

- Location within Lower Manhattan Location within New York City Location within New York
- Established: 1976
- Location: East Village, Manhattan, New York
- Type: Heritage museum
- Founder: Ukrainian National Women's League of America
- Director: Elena Siyanko
- President: Adrian Hewryk
- Architect: George Sawicki
- Public transit access: MTA New York City Bus: M8, M15, M103
- Website: www.theukrainianmuseum.org

The Ukrainian Museum, founded in 1976 by the Ukrainian National Women's League of America in New York City, is the largest museum of its kind outside of Ukraine and is dedicated to the enjoyment, understanding, and preservation of the artistic and cultural heritage of Ukraine. For centuries, Ukraine has been an epicenter for creative output — from traditional music, dance, and folk art to the birthplace of modern art and cinema. Today, the country celebrates its cultural impact on the world for people of all backgrounds. The museum's building was designed by Ukrainian-American architect George Sawicki of Sawicki Tarella Architecture + Design in New York City, and was funded by the Ukrainian-American community. The museum is located at 222 East 6th Street between Second Avenue and Cooper Square in the East Village neighborhood of Manhattan.

== Collection and exhibitions ==
The museum's collection falls into three primary groupings, "folk art", which includes festive and ritual attire and other items of clothing, ceramics, metalwork and carved wood items, as well as Ukrainian Easter eggs (pysanky); "fine arts", including paintings, drawings, sculptures and graphic works by noted Ukrainian artists such as the primitive artist Nikifor, Mykhailo Moroz, Vasyl Hryhorovych Krychevsky, Emma Andiewska, Mykhailo Chereshnovsky, Alexander Archipenko, Peter Kapschutschenko, Alexis Gritchenko, Oleksa Novakivskyi, Ivan Trush, Jacques Hnizdovsky, Liuboslav Hutsaliuk, Bohdan Borzemsky, Halyna Mazepa, Ilona Sochynsky, Arcadia Olesnka-Petryshyn and Edward Kozak, and Petro Cholodny among many others; and items documenting the history and cultural legacy of Ukrainian immigration to the United States, including photographs, personal correspondence, posters, flyers and playbills, stamps and coins.

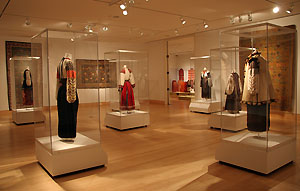
Collection Exhibition

For over 45 years, the museum has worked to promote Ukraine's rich cultural heritage abroad, featuring regular exhibitions often drawing from its own collection of traditional folk costumes, textiles, rare books, stamps, woodworking and photographs and contemporary art. The museum regularly publishes catalogs documenting their scholarship.

In 2015, recognizing the underrepresentation of women, the museum hosted its first major exhibition to examine the relationship between Ukrainian identity and women artists. The Ukrainian Diaspora: Women Artists: 1908-2015 featured over 100 works by 43 artists, including Lydia Bodnar-Balahutrak, Sonia Delaunay, Inka Essenhigh, Slava Gerulak, Natalka Husar, Aka Pereyma, Yulia Pinkusevich, Christina Saj, and Yaroslava Surmach Mills. The exhibition included a catalog with an essay written by guest curator Adrienne Kochman.

Since the Revolution of Dignity, the museum has hosted several exhibits documenting the ongoing war.

== Maria Prymachenko: Glory to Ukraine ==
In spring 2024, the Ukrainian Museum exhibited 100 works from Ukrainian artist Maria Prymachenko. Maria Prymachenko: Glory to Ukraine was the largest exhibit of Prymachenko's work outside of Europe.

== Directors ==
- Maria Shust, 1976 - 2022
- Peter Doroshenko, 2022–2025
- Elena Siyanko, 2026–present

== See also ==
- Ukrainian National Women's League of America – U.S. nonprofit of Ukrainian diaspora
- Harry F. Sinclair House – New York City mansion, home of the Ukrainian Institute of America
