= Ukrainian National Women's League of America =

U.S. nonprofit of Ukrainian diaspora

- Abbreviation: UNWLA
- Formation: 1925
- Type: NGO
- Tax ID no.: EIN: 23-6404061
- Legal status: association
- Members: individual
- President: Natalie Pawlenko
- Awards: 4 stars on Charity Navigator; Platinum Transparency 2025 from Candid; Voice of Peace through Values and Unity (2024), Ukrainian Institute for Women's Public Diplomacy; Certificate of Merit 2024; Order of St. Pantaleimon 2024
- Website: www.unwla.org

Ukrainian National Women's League of America (UNWLA) is a Ukrainian-American charitable organization based in New York, established in 1925. It conducts initiatives related to social welfare, culture, and education in support of Ukrainian people both in Ukraine and within Ukrainian diaspora.

The UNWLA operates independently as a charitable and cultural organization. It has been granted 501(c)(3) tax-exempt status by the Internal Revenue Service. Since February 2022, the UNWLA has directed its efforts toward humanitarian assistance and advocacy in response to the Russian invasion of Ukraine. According to a report by the Diaspora Emergency Action & Coordination (DEMAC) the organization raised approximately $750,000 for humanitarian purposes within a one-month period.

== Structure ==
The UNWLA's bylaws define the organization's internal governance and delineate the roles and responsibilities of its constituent bodies. The highest decision-making authority is the UNWLA Convention, which convenes every three years. The organizational structure consists of a National Board and executive committee, Regional Councils, Branches, and Members-at-Large.

== History ==
The Ukrainian National Women’s League of America (UNWLA) is a nonprofit organization established in 1925. It has been involved in educational, humanitarian, and cultural activities. The organization has stated commitments to religious tolerance, political neutrality, and human rights. Its activities have included efforts to promote awareness of Ukraine and support the preservation of Ukrainian culture and traditions in the United States.

=== Founding ===
The UNWLA was founded in New York City by five Ukrainian women’s organizations, influenced by the Ukrainian Women’s League in Western Ukraine. Its initial goals included uniting Ukrainian women’s groups in the United States, providing humanitarian assistance, and supporting Ukrainian political independence. The organization also conducted cultural and educational activities connected to Ukrainian heritage. Over time, it became involved in the establishment of churches, community centers, and cultural institutions. The organization was formed in part as a response to the exclusion of the National Council of Women of Ukraine from the International Council of Women, following the loss of Ukrainian sovereignty. It was originally named Soyuz Ukrayinok Ameryky (Ukrainian National Women’s League of America).

=== The Ukrainian Museum ===
On October 3, 1976, the UNWLA opened the Ukrainian Museum in New York City, following five decades of collecting and cataloging historical Ukrainian artifacts. The museum was initially located between 12th and 13th Streets on Second Avenue, occupying the fourth and fifth floors of a building. In 1977, it became an independent institution with its own charter and board of trustees.

On February 6, 2005, the museum relocated to a newly constructed building at 222 East 6th Street, designed by architect George Y. Sawicki. The facility includes approximately 24,000 square feet of space. Its opening exhibition, Vision and Continuity, curated by Yaroslaw Leshko, featured works by Ukrainian artist Alexander Archipenko.

== Participation in other organizations ==
=== International Women's Movement ===
In its early years, the UNWLA received support from the International Institutes of the YWCA, a program initiated by Edith Bremer (1865–1964). Members participated in activities aimed at presenting and promoting Ukrainian culture, including folk art exhibitions and performances at events such as the annual Women’s International Exposition in New York City. A folk art exhibit presented at the Ukrainian Pavilion of the 1933 Chicago World’s Fair was later included in the collection of the Ukrainian Museum.

In 1948, the UNWLA was accepted as an associate member of the General Federation of Women's Clubs (GFWC), a status not previously held by other U.S.-based cultural organizations. That same year, it was among the founding members of the World Federation of Ukrainian Women's Organizations (WFUWO). In 1952, the UNWLA joined the National Council of Women of the United States (NCW).

=== American Federation of International Institutes ===
From 1953 to 1959, UNWLA President Olena D. Lototsky served on the board of the American Federation of International Institutes. In 1958, she was acknowledged by a national women's organization for her contributions to international cultural cooperation. In 1993, Iryna Kurowyckyj, who later served as president of the UNWLA (1999–2008), was elected president of the NCW.

=== American Coalition for Ukraine ===
Since the onset of Russia’s full-scale invasion of Ukraine, the UNWLA has served as a founding member of the American Coalition for Ukraine (ACU), a U.S.-based coalition of organizations mobilizing advocacy in support of Ukraine’s defense and sovereignty. UNWLA’s Member-at-Large and Chair of the Advocacy Committee, Marianna Tretiak, was elected President of the ACU, underscoring UNWLA’s leadership within the coalition.

Representatives of the UNWLA participated in the October 2025 Ukraine Action Summit in Washington, D.C., joining more than 700 delegates from across the country to promote sustained U.S. assistance to Ukraine.

== See also ==
- Harry F. Sinclair House - New York City mansion, home of the Ukrainian Institute of America
- Ukrainian Museum – Museum of Ukrainian culture and heritage in New York City
- Ukrainian National Association – North American fraternal organization founded in 1894
- American Coalition for Ukraine – Coalition of organizations
