= American Coalition for Ukraine =

Coalition of organizations

The American Coalition for Ukraine (ACU) is a U.S.-based alliance of nonprofit organizations that coordinate advocacy efforts in support of Ukraine. It brings together a wide network of Ukrainian-American and partner organizations working to strengthen U.S. political, humanitarian, and public support for Ukraine following Russia's full-scale invasion in 2022. It was established in the aftermath of the Russian invasion of Ukraine and draws on Ukrainian Americans and the American public. It organizes conferences and exhibitions for supporters of Ukraine in the U.S., as well as educational sessions to prepare constituents for meetings with members of the U.S. Congress. In 2025, Kyiv Post described the ACU as "the largest coordinated advocacy effort in the Ukrainian diaspora" in the U.S.

== History and structure ==
The ACU was launched on May 5, 2022, with a joint press conference in front of the White House in Washington, DC. In September 2022, 42 non-profits from across the United States formalized their advocacy alliance in support of Ukraine's sovereignty and territorial integrity. The founding members of the Coalition include US-based nonprofit organizations Razom for Ukraine, the Ukrainian National Women's League of America (UNWLA), Nova Ukraine, the Ukrainian American Coordinating Council, United Help Ukraine, and Klych, as well as non-Ukrainian founding members MedGlobal and the Georgian Association in the US. The Coalition also includes a number of small and medium nonprofit organizations as members, such as Revived Soldiers, Ukrainian-American House, Hromada, and Unite with Ukraine. Coalition members and associates represent segments of the Ukrainian-American diaspora, which numbers over one million strong according to the 2020 U.S. Census, as well as other Americans supporting Ukraine.

As of October 2025, the Coalition reports 45 member organizations and a larger number of associate organizations. The board of directors is the governing body of the Coalition.

In 2026, the American Coalition for Ukraine was declared an undesirable organization in Russia.

== Ukraine Action Summits ==
The Coalition organizes Ukraine Action Summits in Washington, DC where elected officials meet their constituents to discuss policy issues relating to U.S. support for Ukraine, including foreign assistance and sanctions. Such meetings were acknowledged by US Senators Chuck Schumer, Alex Padilla and Bob Menendez, as well as Speaker Emerita Pelosi and Representatives Steny Hoyer and Joseph Morelle. The table below summarizes statistics for the Summits, including the number of registered attendees, the number of US states they represented, and the number of congressional meetings they held including drop-in meetings.

Statistics for Ukraine Action Summits held in Washington, DC
Summits	Dates	Registered attendees	US states represented	Number of meetings
1	September 18–22, 2022	270	33	170
2	April 23–25, 2023	320	34	176
3	October 22–24, 2023	500	34	193
4	April 13–16, 2024	560	47	350
5	September 22–25, 2024	510	44	300+
6	April 6–9, 2025	600+	50 + Puerto Rico + DC	444
7	October 25–29, 2025	700+	50 + Puerto Rico + DC	452

=== 2022 – 2023 ===
Early Ukraine Action Summits were primarily organized by Razom for Ukraine (a founding member of the Coalition) and facilitated the establishment of the ACU. The second Summit extended the program with networking opportunities, such as discussion panels with representatives of US nonprofits and government agencies, as well as advocacy activists. The Summit featured Viktor Yushchenko, the former President of Ukraine. The third Summit further increased the number of attendees and the number of meetings on the Capitol Hill.

=== 2024 ===
At the fourth Ukraine Action Summit, participants met with lawmakers to discuss U.S. foreign assistance for Ukraine, including proposed funding levels. The summit coincided with deliberations in Congress regarding a $61 billion foreign aid package.. The House passed the relevant foreign assistance bills on April 20; the Senate passed them on April 23, when President Joe Biden signed them into law

The fifth Summit was held in Washington, DC simultaneously with a United Nations General Assembly session in New York City and a visit by President Volodymyr Zelenskyy to the US. It focused on the continuation of military and humanitarian aid, and facilitating long-term cooperation between Ukraine and the United States. The Summit featured an address by Ukrainian World Congress (UWC) President Paul M. Grod and discussions on international support for Ukraine. Immediately after the Summit, President Biden issued a statement of support for Ukraine and allocated $7.9 billion for military assistance.

=== 2025 ===
The sixth Ukraine Action Summit was the first event in the series to bring delegates from every state and Puerto Rico to the capital. Meetings on Capitol Hill with top U.S. lawmakers, included Speaker of the House Mike Johnson, Senate Majority Leader Chuck Schumer, and Speaker Emerita Nancy Pelosi. The Summit focused on bipartisan support for continued U.S. military, economic, and humanitarian aid to Ukraine, and featured leadership training, advocacy briefings, and networking events. Speakers included Ambassador Oksana Markarova, Nobel Peace Prize laureate Oleksandra Matviichuk, Dr. Hanna Hopko, and Representative Tom Kean Jr. Advocates called on Congress to enforce the REPO Act, return Ukrainian children abducted by Russia, and maintain sanctions against Russia.

The seventh Ukraine Action Summit included a conference and expo, as well as educational and orientation sessions on advocacy strategy, policy briefings by subject-matter experts, networking opportunities for nonprofits and volunteers, and coordinated visits to congressional offices. The summit pursued the following legislative priorities:

- Using frozen Russian assets to support Ukraine's defense and reconstruction.
- Strengthening sanctions against Russia to increase pressure.
- Supporting the return of abducted Ukrainian children.
- Advocating long-term security guarantees for Ukraine.

Participants and speakers included Marianna Tretiak, chair of the ACU board, Erin Elizabeth McKee, CEO of Nova Ukraine and former U.S. ambassador and USAID assistant administrator, Daniel Runde, senior advisor at DevTech Systems and the Center for Strategic and International Studies (CSIS), Marina Bayduyk, head of ACU's Membership and Sponsorship Committee, and former U.S. Ambassador to Ukraine William Taylor. Summit speakers argued that framing Ukraine as a strategic U.S. ally, not just an aid recipient, would help attract bipartisan congressional support.

== Year-around advocacy ==
The American Coalition for Ukraine functions as a year-round coordinating body for over 100 member organizations and associates supporting U.S. aid to Ukraine. Organization leadership engages with U.S. and Ukrainian media on current policy developments related to Ukraine. ACU Board member Aleksandr (Sashko) Krapivkin provided commentary on diplomatic initiatives and peace negotiations. According to reporting by Kyiv Post, member organizations' "policy experts have worked with the American Coalition for Ukraine to identify the most impactful legislation that hundreds of Americans will advocate for when they come to Washington." Marianna Tretiak, chair of the ACU Board, has emphasized the organization's role in building grassroots advocacy networks across all 50 states and engaging non-Ukrainian Americans in advocacy efforts. According to an April 2025 interview, Tretiak emphasized the Coalition's strategy of training advocates to engage directly with their members of Congress and building relationships with legislators outside the summit periods. The Coalition also coordinates the Ukrainian-American Blood Drive, an annual charitable initiative described as "a gesture of gratitude from Ukrainians and Ukrainian-Americans to the people of the United States for the substantial aid and support provided to Ukraine in their fight against the Russian invasion."

== Reception ==
Forbes reported in April 2024 that more than 500 advocates participated in the Spring Ukraine Action Summit in Washington, where they conducted approximately 350 congressional meetings advocating for continued U.S. military and humanitarian aid to Ukraine, and subsequent reporting noted that these advocacy efforts contributed to additional legislative co-sponsorships for Ukraine-related bills. Following the Summit, The New York Times reported that escalating political pressure contributed to Speaker Mike Johnson's decision to bring a $95 billion aid package to a House vote on April 20, 2024, just four days after the Summit concluded, resulting in passage of the legislation with broad bipartisan support. In 2025, reporting by Kyiv Post described the Ukraine Action Summit as a significant national gathering that brings together both members of the Ukrainian diaspora and Americans without personal ties to Ukraine to engage with policymakers and raise awareness for Ukraine policy in U.S. political discourse.
