= MedGlobal =

American medical charity

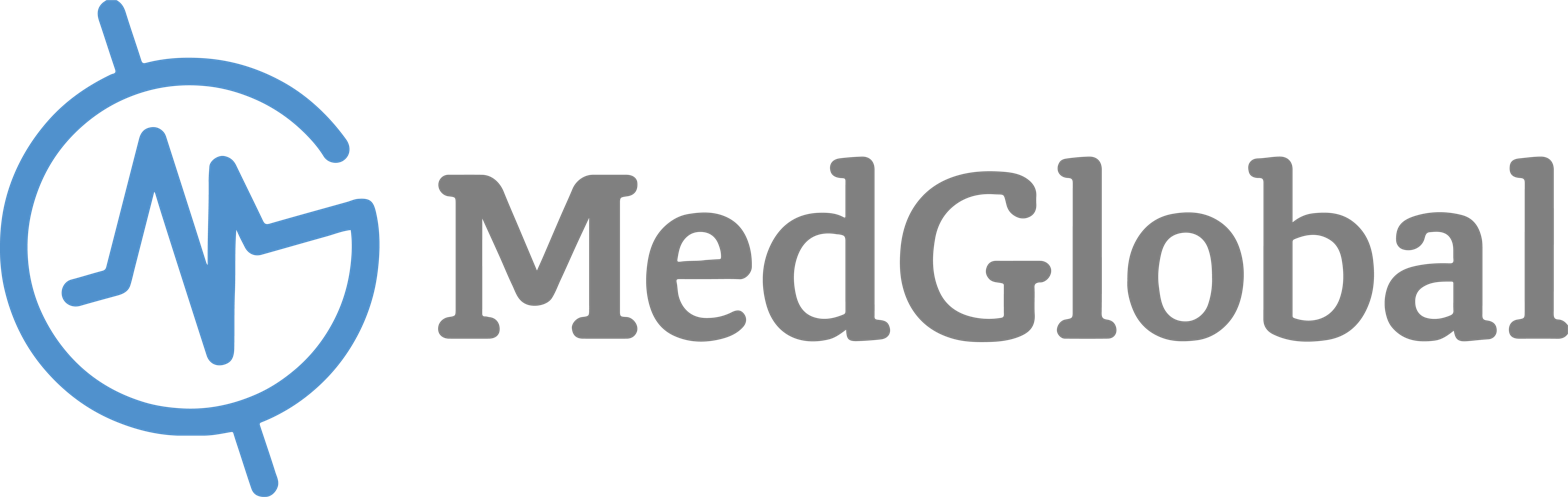
- Formation: 2017; 9 years ago
- Founders: Zaher Sahoul; John Kahler
- Founded at: Chicago, Illinois, U.S.
- Type: NGO
- Legal status: Charity
- Headquarters: Chicago, Illinois, U.S.
- Key people: Zaher Sahoul (president)
- Website: medglobal.org

MedGlobal is an international non-profit organization based in Chicago, Illinois, U.S.

== History ==
MedGlobal was founded in 2017 by Zaher Sahoul and John Kahler as a response to the Rohingya crisis in Bangladesh. Since its initial response to the Rohingya crisis, MedGlobal has embedded itself in the camps, supporting a hospital and operating a clinic to address and mitigate health disparities among the affected.

MedGlobal has been active in Yemen, Colombia, Syria, Bangladesh, Ukraine, and Palestine since 2017. It provides emergency medical assistance to civilians in crisis-affected regions internationally by mobilizing medical supplies and teams of healthcare workers.

MedGlobal is also known for recognizing notable humanitarians by conferring the MedGlobal Humanitarian Award.

== Operations ==
=== Bangladesh ===
From 2017 to 2019, MedGlobal volunteers provided over 17,000 hours of aid to Rohingya refugees. In this time, the organization's medical professionals helped more than 80,000 people in need.

=== Palestine ===
In January 2024, five doctors from MedGlobal volunteered in the Gaza Strip for 16 days, working in clinics and hospitals in Rafah, an area which was affected by an Israeli military operation.

=== Syria ===
In 2016, John Kahler and Zaher Sahloul, who later founded MedGlobal, were among the last Western doctors to leave Aleppo, Syria, before the conflict in the city escalated, making it too dangerous for Americans to remain. They received humanitarian awards for their efforts in Aleppo and were named Chicagoans of the Year for 2016. The Bush Foundation also honored them with the Daily Points of Light Award.

In 2023, following devastating earthquakes in Syria and Turkey, MedGlobal volunteers traveled to the epicenter of the disaster. They distributed medical supplies and provided mental health support to numerous trauma victims affected by the catastrophic events.

=== Ukraine ===
In 2022, amidst the Ukrainian refugee crisis, MedGlobal provided the Ministry of Health with medical supplies to support the healthcare needs of refugees. The delivered aid included first aid kits, portable ultrasounds, ventilators, and surgical kits.

=== Yemen ===
In September 2017, MedGlobal was among the first organizations to respond to the crisis in Yemen, a country affected by internal conflict that led to large-scale displacement and a severe cholera outbreak affecting over 700,000 people. The team traveled for five hours under heightened security concerns to reach the refugee camps, as there were rumors of al-Qaeda offering bounties of $200,000 for capturing an American and $1 million for kidnapping one.
