= Focus (Ukrainian magazine) =

Ukrainian weekly Russian-language magazine

Фокус

- Focus's front cover issue № 24 (15 June 2007)
- Chief Editor: Mariia Skibinska
- Former editors: Vakhtang Kipiani (2006-2007)
- Categories: News magazine
- Frequency: Weekly
- Circulation: 34,390 per week
- Publisher: Volodymyr Solomakha (Director)
- First issue: 29 September 2006; 19 years ago
- Company: Focus Media LLC
- Country: Ukraine
- Language: Russian (2006-2021), Ukrainian (since 2022)
- Website: focus.ua

Focus (Ukrainian: Тижневик «Фокус», romanized: Tyzhnevyk 'Fokus', lit. 'Focus weekly', pronounced [tɪʒˈnɛwɪk ˈfɔkʊs]) is a Ukrainian national weekly news magazine, published in Kyiv. The magazine's motto: "Every detail has a meaning".

== Overview ==
The launch of Focus magazine on 29 September 2006 was intended to fill the native news magazine market with corresponding competitor to more notorious magazines such as Newsweek, Der Spiegel, and others. The magazine consists of 84 fully illustrated pages of A4 format and issued every Friday (previously - every Saturday). Focus was one of the several other projects created by the Ukrainian Media Holding in 2006, among which were magazine Zdorovie, Dengi.ua, and others.

On 2 April 2020, businessman Oleksandr Borshchevych became the owner of Focus Media LLC, which owns Focus magazine and the focus.ua website.

After 24 February 2022, when the Russian Armed Forces launched a full-scale invasion of Ukraine, publication of the weekly magazine was suspended for the duration of martial law, but the website focus.ua continued to operate.

In May 2023, the Ukrainian edition of Forbes published a ranking of the most popular media outlets in Ukraine entitled "Kings of News", in which the website focus.ua ranked sixth in terms of number of views.

In 2025, Mariia Skibinska was appointed as the new editor-in-chief of Focus. At that time, she had 18 years of experience in Ukrainian media.

== Lists ==
Similar to Forbes beside news publishing the magazine specializes in national popularization through a variety of rankings: "The most rich man in Ukraine", "The most influential woman in Ukraine", "Top 55 cities for living in Ukraine", and others.

- 100 most influential women of Ukraine (since 2006)
- 55 best cities for living in Ukraine (since 2007, originally as top-50)
- 200 richest people in Ukraine (since 2006, other names: top-150 (2009), top-130 (2008), top-100 (2007))
- 200 most influential Ukrainians (since 2007)
- 25 most successful business-ladies of Ukraine (since 2010)
- The richest football clubs of Ukraine
- 50 most influential people (by region) (Dnipropetrovsk - 2007, Kharkiv - 2007, Crimea - 2007, Odesa - 2008, Donbas - 2006, Donetsk - 2010)
