= Ukrainian Association of Washington State =

Organization

- Асоціація українців штату Вашингтон
- Formation: 27 September 1971
- Founder: Wolodymyr Klos
- Location: Seattle, Washington
- Coordinates: 47°47′18.33″N 122°16′32.93″W
- President: Lilya Kovalenko
- Vice president: Eduard Dudar
- Secretary: Olga Krupa
- Treasurer: Oleksandr Dudyshyn
- Key people: Other members of the Board of Directors: Valentyna Drohomyretska, Maksym Kovalenko, Nazar Stetsyuk, Katia Sedova, and Oksana Pierce.
- Main organ: Board of Directors
- Website: www.uaws.org
- Formerly called: Ukrainian American Club of Washington

The Ukrainian Association of Washington State (UAWS) (Ukrainian: Асоціація українців штату Вашингтон, formerly The Ukrainian American Club of Washington Ukrainian: Українсько - Американський клуб Вашингтону) is a regional non-profit organization that represents cultural and social interests of Americans of Ukrainian origin, promotes understanding between Americans and Ukrainians, and supports Ukrainian cultural and scientific centers worldwide.

Founded in 1971, the association organizes cultural and political events for residents of the Northwestern United States and British Columbia. Traditionally, the association participates in local and international cultural events and sponsors annual regional celebrations for the Independence Day of Ukraine and the birthday of Ukrainian poet Taras Shevchenko.

UAWS maintains relations with the Ukrainian Congress Committee of America, the Ukrainian Embassy and Consulate, the Ukrainian diaspora in Canada, Ukrainian churches of various denominations, and other regional ethnic organizations. According to different estimates, the association represents between 55,000 and 100,000 Americans of Ukrainian origin.

== History ==
=== 1970s ===
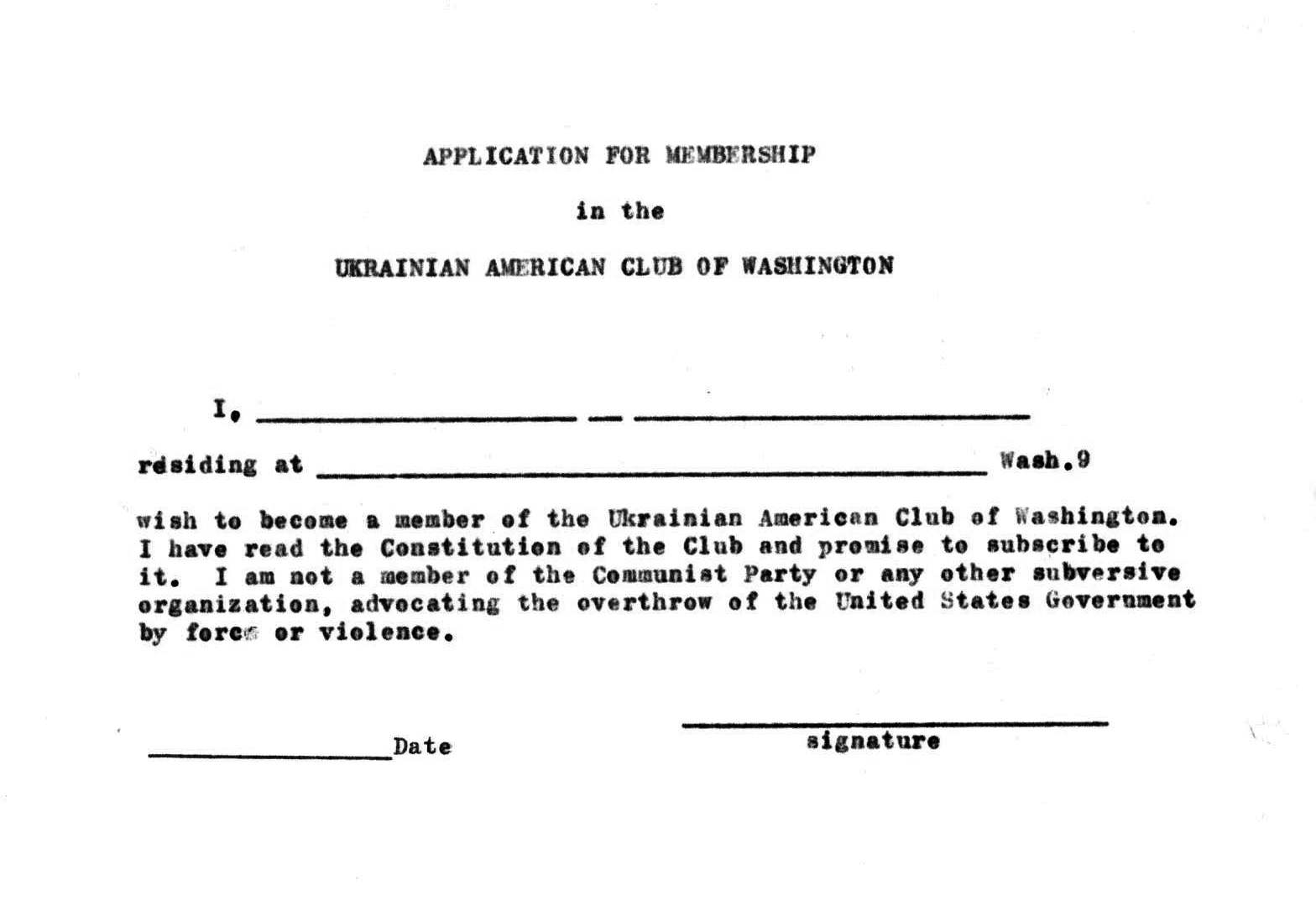
Original application to the club

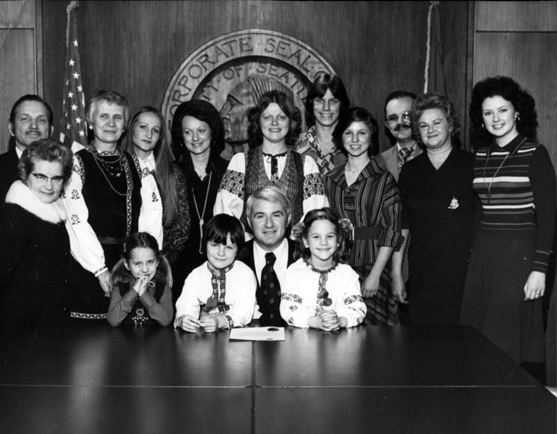
The signing of the Proclamation Supporting Ukrainian Independence by Seattle Mayor Wes Uhlman in the presence of the club's delegation, January 1976.

The Ukrainian Association of Washington State was founded in Seattle on September 27, 1971, and was originally named the Ukrainian American Club of Washington. The club's founder and first president was Wolodymyr Klos, an immigrant from Ukraine.

In the early 1970s, the club initiated a number of cultural and political events that became annual traditions. The first official event was a Ukrainian Christmas celebration at the Museum of History and Industry in December 1971. Club members introduced Ukrainian Christmas traditions, and the club's choir sang Ukrainian Christmas carols. The museum also opened an exhibit of Ukrainian arts and crafts. Throughout the 1970s, similar Christmas events were organized by the club.

Since 1972, UAWS has also celebrated the birthday of Taras Shevchenko, a famous Ukrainian poet. In 1972, the first grand ceremony took place at St. James Cathedral.

In 1973, the club held its first political activity by commemorating Ukrainian independence. In 1973, Ukraine was still incorporated into the Soviet Union, and the Ukrainian diaspora traditionally recognized January 22 as Ukrainian Independence day. On this day in 1918, the Central Council of Ukraine adopted its IV Universal, a document proclaiming Ukrainian independence; however, Ukraine was subsequently overrun by Bolshevik armies and incorporated into the Soviet Union. The 1973 event hosted hundreds of guests from the northwestern US and British Columbia. Proclamations in support of Ukrainian independence were signed by the governor of Washington, Daniel Evans, and Seattle Mayor Wes Uhlman, who delivered a speech.

In 1975, the UAWS sponsored the first Ukrainian Northwest Festival in support of Ukrainian independence. Over 3,500 guests from the US and Canada attended the festival, which featured Ukrainian artists, musicians, and dancers. Former Canadian Prime Minister John Diefenbaker and a number of US senators and congressional representatives sent supportive messages to the festival's attendees.

In 1976, in addition to its regular activities, the association participated in the celebration of the United States Bicentennial, including a special exhibition of Ukrainian folk art.

=== 1980s ===
In the 1980s, the club continued its tradition of commemorating Ukrainian Independence Day, and organized proclamations in support of Ukrainian independence signed by Washington governors Dixy Lee Ray and Booth Gardner as well as Seattle Mayor Charles Royer.

In September 1982, the Ukrainian Association of Washington State organized protests in support of the Reagan administration’s policy against the construction of the Urengoy–Pomary–Uzhhorod pipeline through Soviet Ukraine. The Reagan administration believed that such a project would make Europe dangerously dependent on Russian gas. Protests took place in Seattle's Gas Works Park and were supported by Americans of Eastern European origin.

=== 1990s ===
For the Ukrainian diaspora, the most important event of the 1990s was the Declaration of Independence of Ukraine of 1991, when Ukraine achieved true independence as the result of the dissolution of the Soviet Union. This event triggered a strong emotional reaction within the local diaspora. The club's original founder, Wolodymyr Klos, returned to Ukraine. The Ukrainian Association of Washington State started raising money for the newly formed state of Ukraine, including assistance to the victims of the Chernobyl disaster.

In 1991, all club events related to Ukrainian independence were moved from January 22 (the anniversary of the IV Universal document from the Central Council of Ukraine) to August 24, the current official Independence Day of Ukraine.

Beginning in 1991, the composition of the Ukrainian diaspora of Washington State began to change. Most early club members immigrated to the United States from Halychyna after World War II, fleeing the terror of Stalin's regime. These immigrants were exclusively native Ukrainian speakers and were largely parishioners of the Ukrainian Orthodox or Ukrainian Greek Catholic Church. After 1991, newcomers to Washington State came from a variety of Ukrainian regions, and the majority of churchgoers were Evangelical Protestants. As a result, the Ukrainian diaspora of Washington State became more heterogeneous, and UAWS activities became unconnected to any particular church.

=== 21st century ===
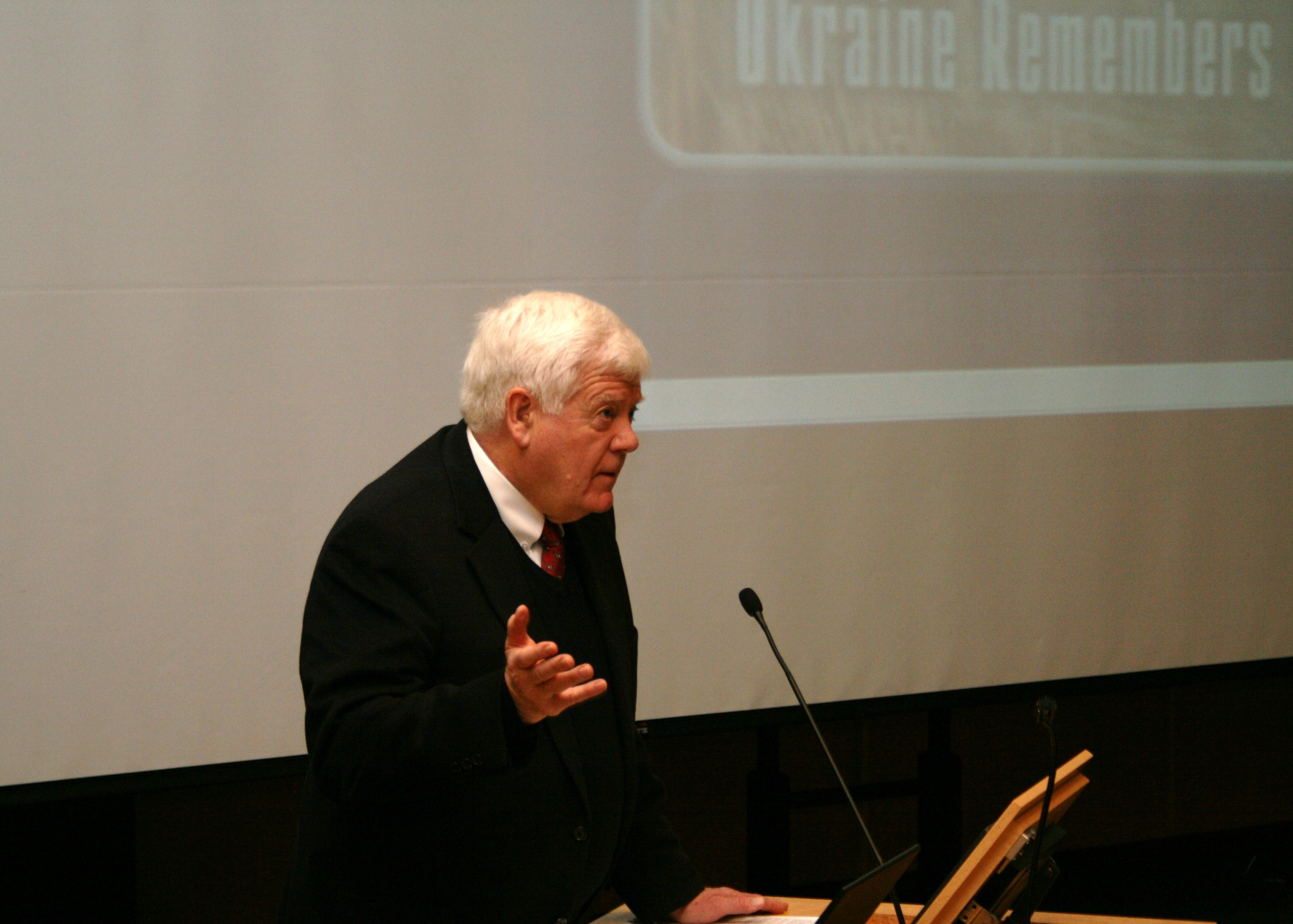
US Congressman Jim McDermott speaks at the event commemorating Holodomor, Seattle 2008

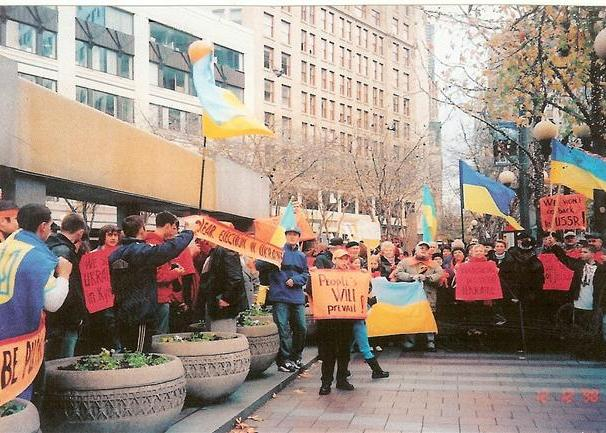
Rally in support of the Orange Revolution, Seattle 2004

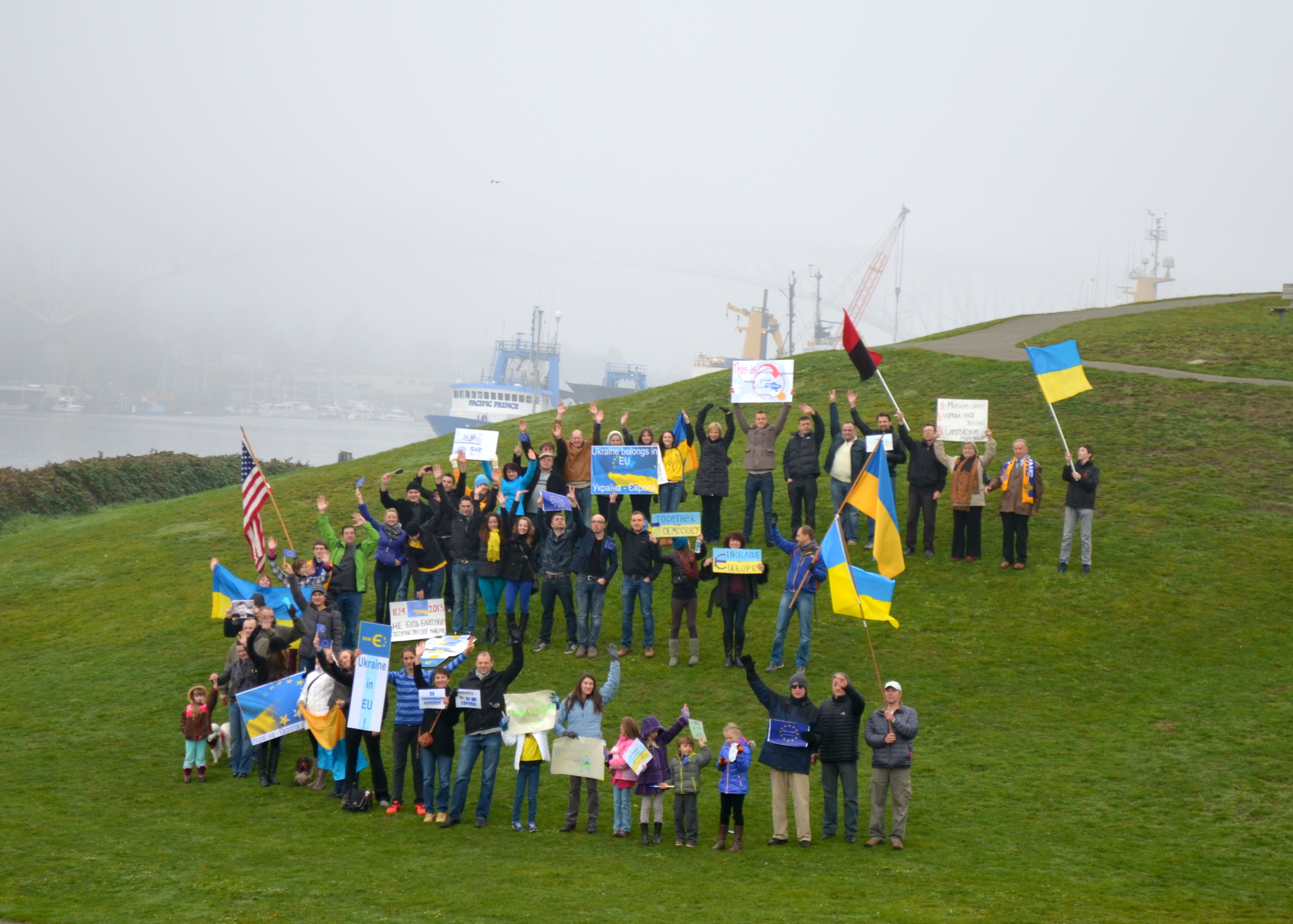
Rally in support of Euromaidan, Seattle 2014

In 2008, the association took part in the worldwide Holodomor Remembrance Flame event, commemorating the 75th anniversary of Holodomor (the Soviet Ukraine Great Famine from 1932 to 1933, which killed millions of Ukrainians). After its journey through Australia and Canada, the torch entered the United States in Seattle, where it was solemnly passed to the US Ukrainian ambassador. The Ukrainian Association of Washington State sponsored the event and the subsequent reception, which was attended by officials from Ukraine, the United States, and Canada.

For the association, the most important events in the 21st century were the Orange Revolution of 2004; Euromaidan and the subsequent impeachment of Viktor Yanukovych; and the 2014–15 Russian military intervention in Ukraine. These events triggered mass protests in Ukraine, especially on Maidan Nezalezhnosti in Kyiv, as well as protests within all Ukrainian diaspora.

In 2004, widespread falsification of the results of the Ukrainian presidential election in favor of pro-Russian candidate Victor Yanukovych led to a political crisis and a series of civil disobedience actions that were dubbed the Orange Revolution. These events led to a repeat vote that secured the victory for Yanukovich's rival, Viktor Yushchenko. UAWS took part in protests supporting the Orange Revolution and promoted fair and transparent election procedures. The association solicited the Ukrainian administration to allow Washington State Ukrainians who retained Ukrainian citizenship—an estimated 15,000 people—to vote. For the initial vote, the Ukrainian embassy declined the association's petition to open a polling place in Seattle, and the Ukrainian consulate in San Francisco, located over 800 miles from Seattle, remained the closest polling place. UAWS organized a bus convoy from Seattle to San Francisco so at least some of the enfranchised Ukrainians could cast their votes. During the repeat vote, the association successfully compelled the Ukrainian Embassy to open a polling station in Kent, Washington—the only such concession made by the Ukrainian government during the presidential elections of 2004.

In 2014, the club supported mass protests in Ukraine against the abrupt decision of the Ukrainian government to discontinue the integration of Ukraine into the European Union. Rallies in support of Euromaidan (a wave of demonstrations and civil unrest in Ukraine) were held in Seattle. The subsequent aggravation of the crisis, including the impeachment of Viktor Yanukovych, the annexation of Crimea by the Russian Federation, and the 2014–15 Russian military intervention in Ukraine, sparked new waves of protests among local Ukrainians. UAWS raised money to support protesters in Ukraine, received immigrant Ukrainian families whose members were killed in the war, and organized regional rallies and protests.

== Organizational structure ==
The association's main organ is the nine-member Board of Directors. The Board of Directors elects an executive president. As of 2021, directors are Lilya Kovalenko (president), Eduard Dudar (vice-president), Olga Krupa (secretary), Oleksandr Dudyshyn (treasurer), Valentyna Drohomyretska, Maksym Kovalenko, Nazar Stetsyuk, Katia Sedova, and Oksana Pierce. The Association publishes quarterly reports for its members.

Selected Presidents of the Ukrainian Association of Washington State

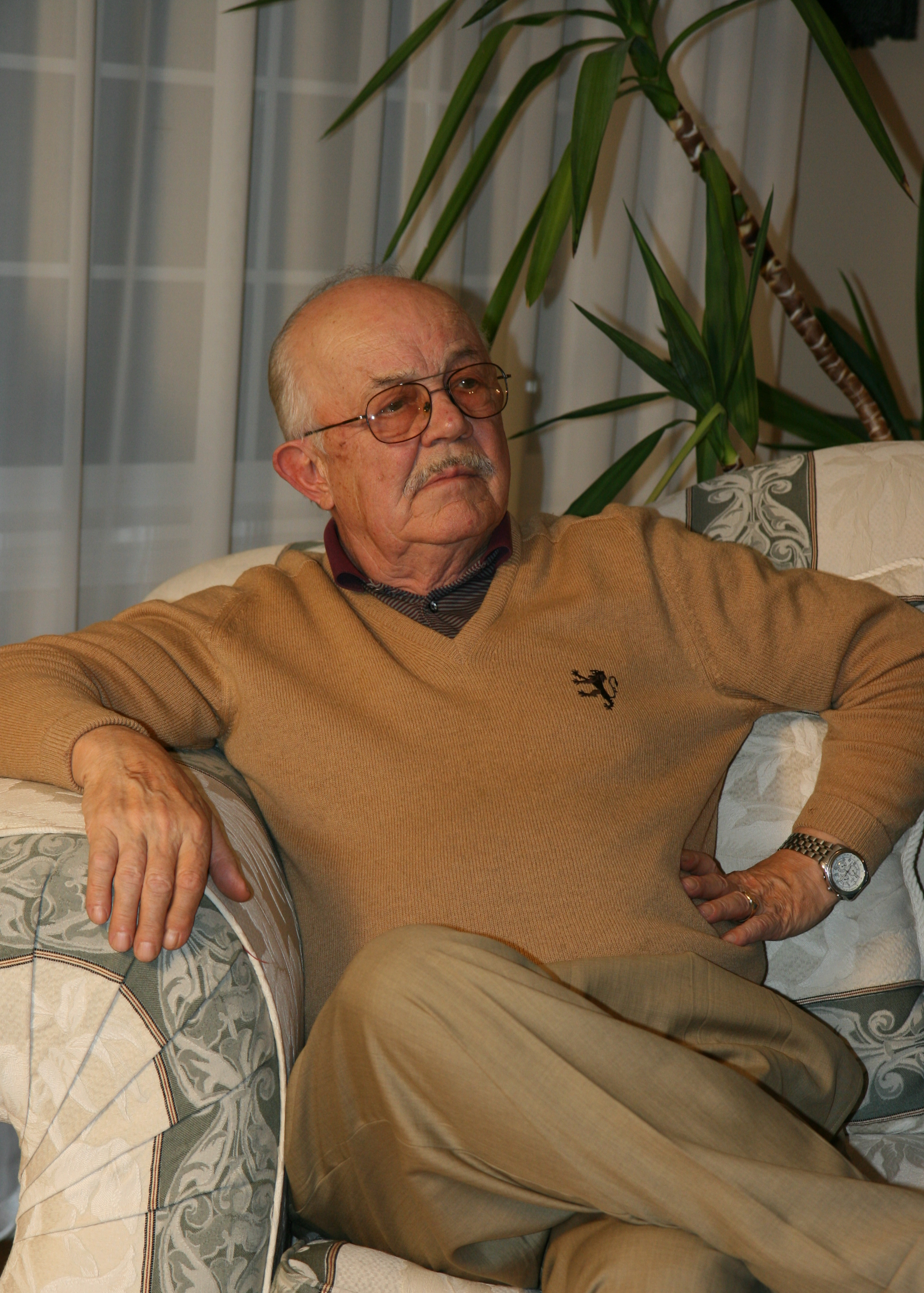
Orest Danysh; 1979–1986 and 1989–1992

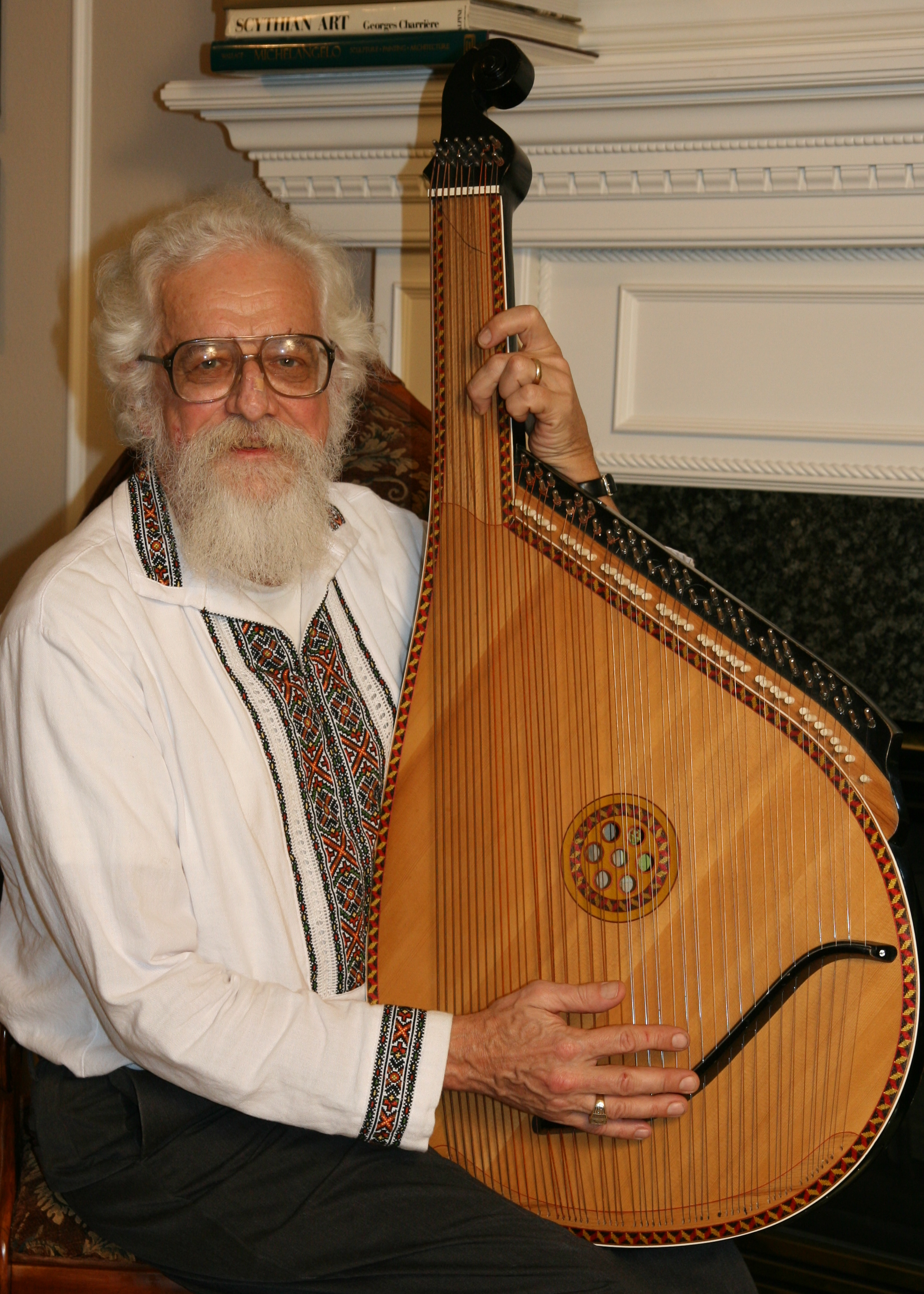
Alex Krynytzky; 1986–1988

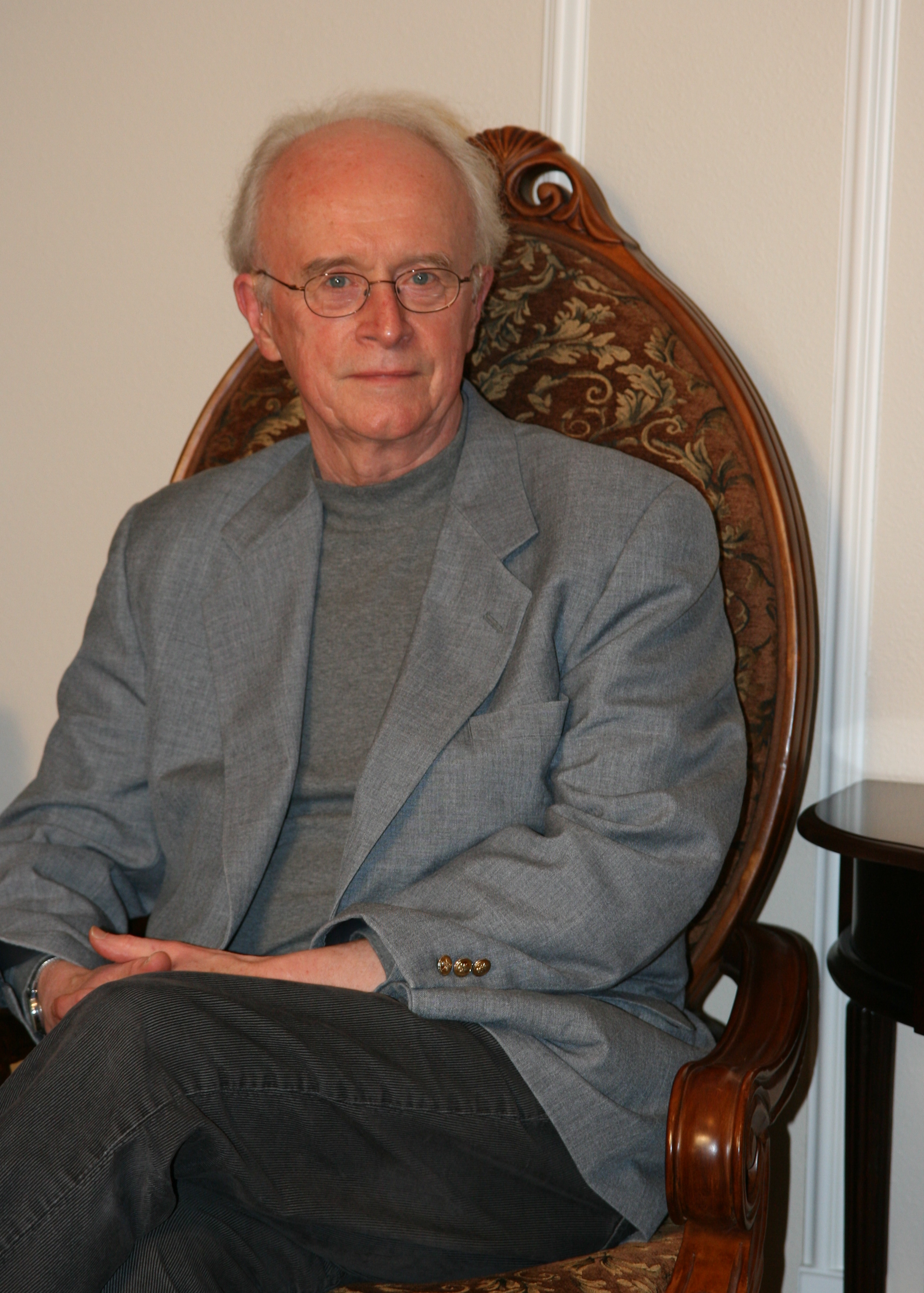
Yevhen Lemcio; 1994–2000 and 2004–2006

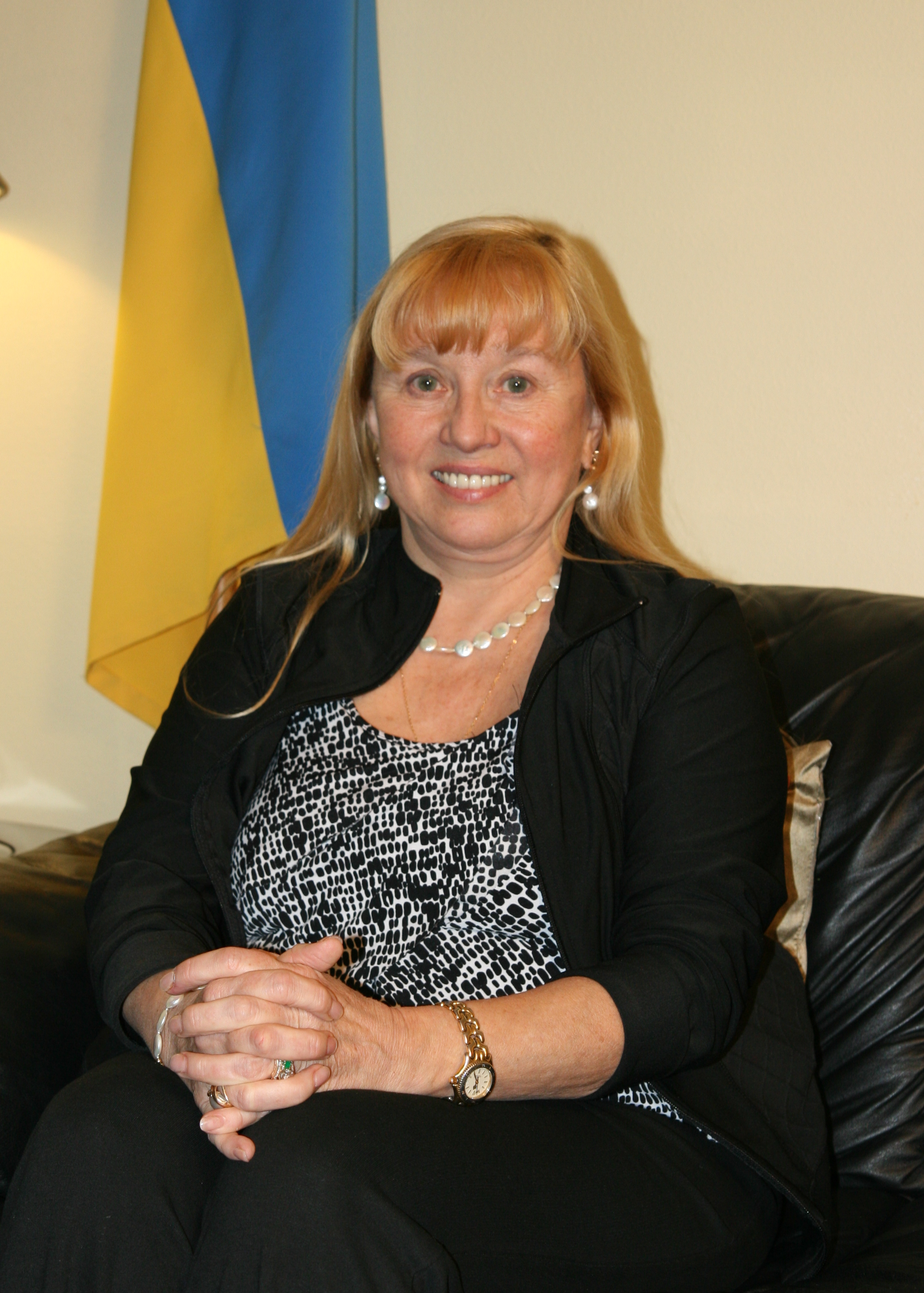
Luba Kihichak; 2000–2004

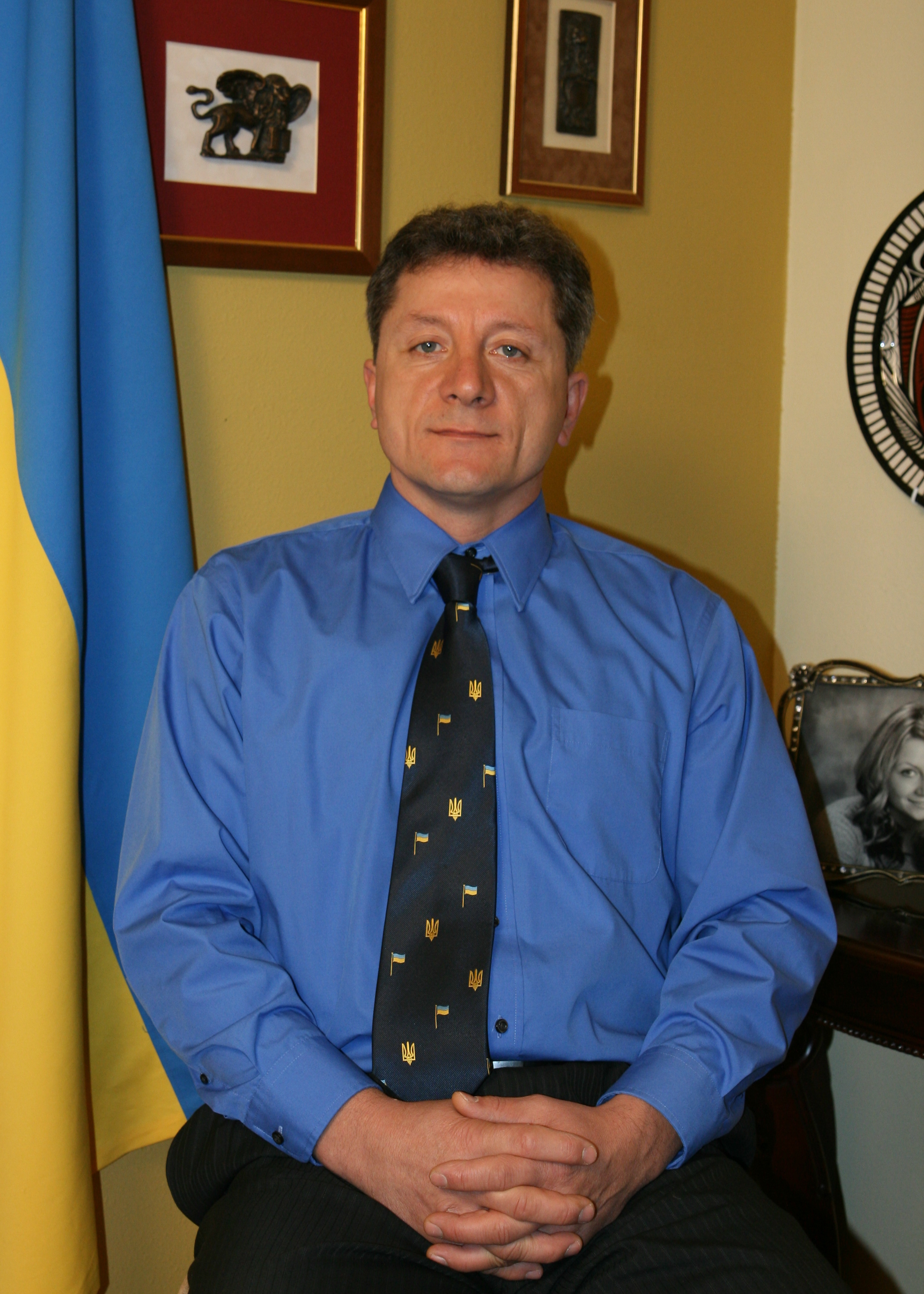
Petro Drogomiretskiy; 2006–2015

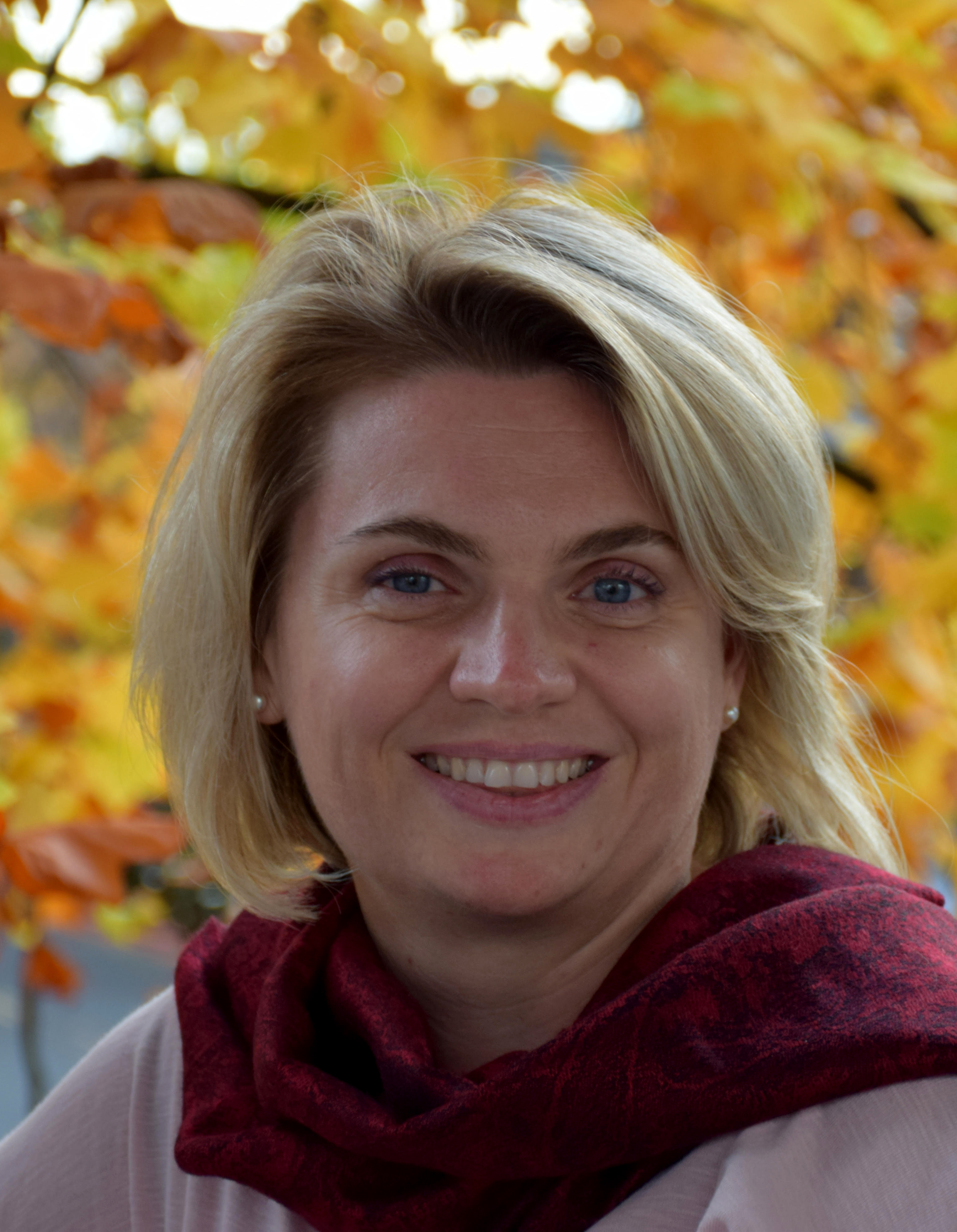
Lilya Kovalenko; from 2015

== Activities ==
=== Cultural activities ===
One of the main focuses of the Ukrainian Association of Washington State from its foundation was to preserve and cultivate Ukrainian culture. The association traditionally celebrates the birthday of Taras Shevchenko, participates in regional Christmas festivals, and represents Ukrainian culture at the Northwest Folklife Festival in Seattle, as well as other festivals in the US and Canada.

External videos
- Presentation video of the «Barvinok» folk group

Since 2004, the club has sponsored a folk dance group, Barvinok which won multiple awards in international Ukrainian festivals in the Ukrainian dance category. For example, during the 2010 Ukrainian festival in Canada, Barvinok won 4 gold and 2 silver medals.

In 1973, UAWS organized Ukrainian language courses at the University of Washington. The association continues to sponsor Ukrainian Studies in the university. In addition, the club funds Ukrainian languages classes for children and offers emergency translation service in the region.

UAWS organizes concerts of Ukrainian artists in the Seattle area. These artists include Vasyl Nechepa, Vasyl Shkliar, and Anastasia Prikhodko.

Even though, Ukrainian diaspora became culturally heterogeneous in the last 15 years, association activists see these developments as an opportunity to expand and amplify Ukrainian cultural heritage.

Cultural events sponsored by the association

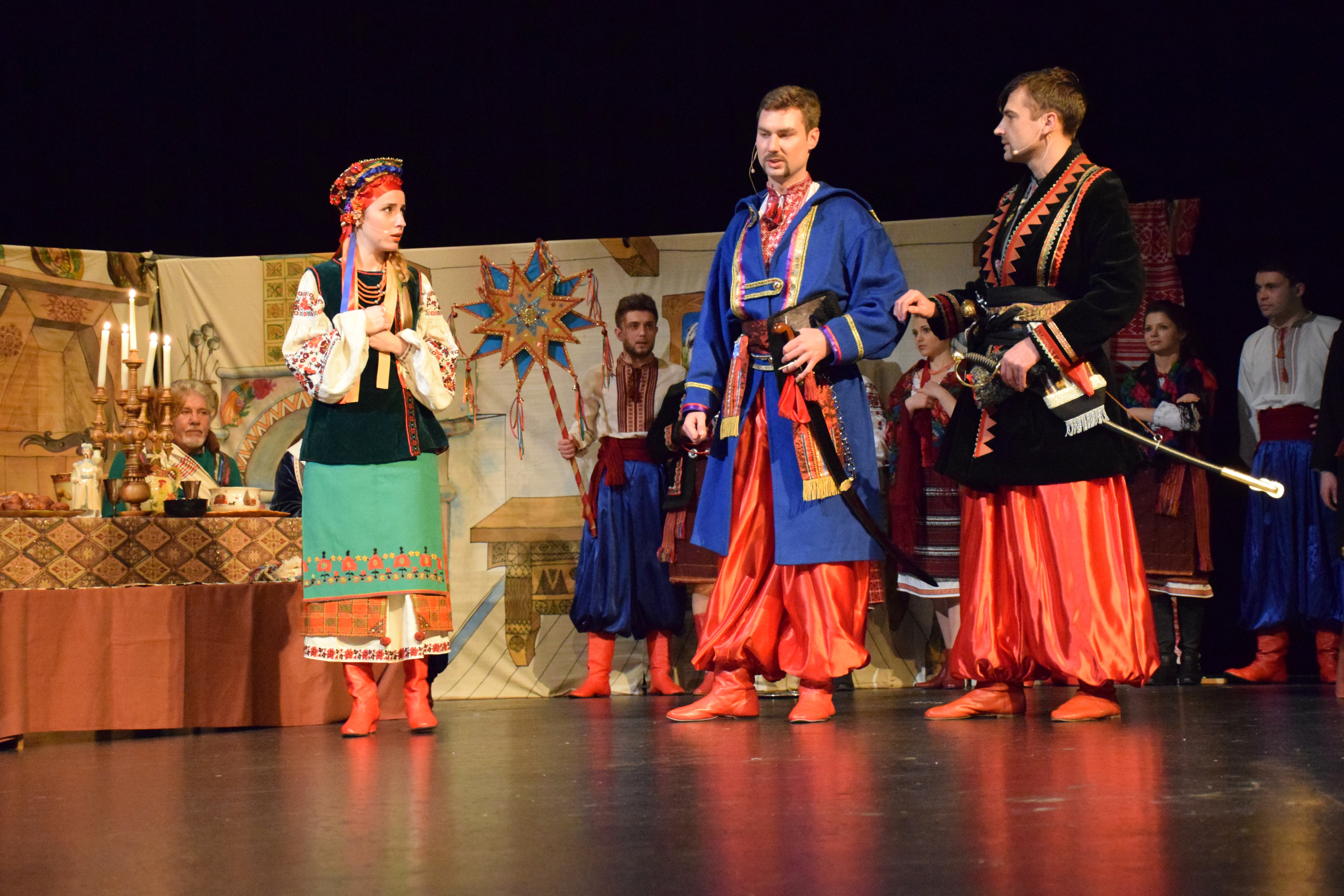
Performance of Taras Shevchenko's play Nazar Stodolya in Renton theater, 2014

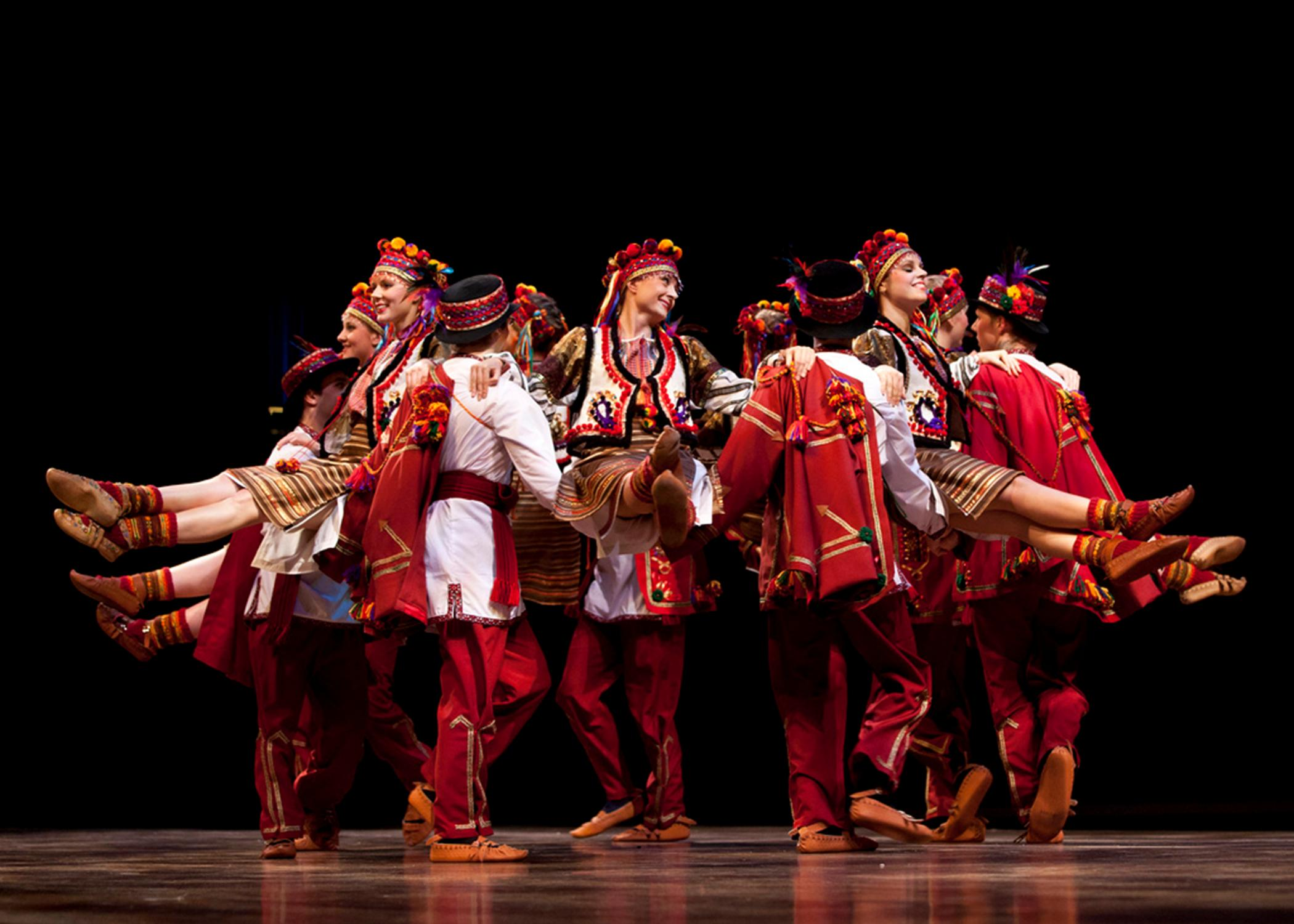
«Barvinok» senior class performance at the Northwest Folklife Festival, 2013

=== Political activities ===
The Ukrainian Association of Washington State began its political activities in 1973 with events that commemorated the proclamation of Ukrainian independence on January 22, 1918. In the northwestern United States. Prior to genuine Ukraine independence, obtained in 1991, the association inspired various American officials to sign proclamations in support of Ukrainian independence, including Seattle Mayors Wes Uhlman and Charles Royer as well as Governors Daniel J. Evans, Dixy Lee Ray, and Booth Gardner.

Proclamations in support of Ukrainian independence inspired by UAWS

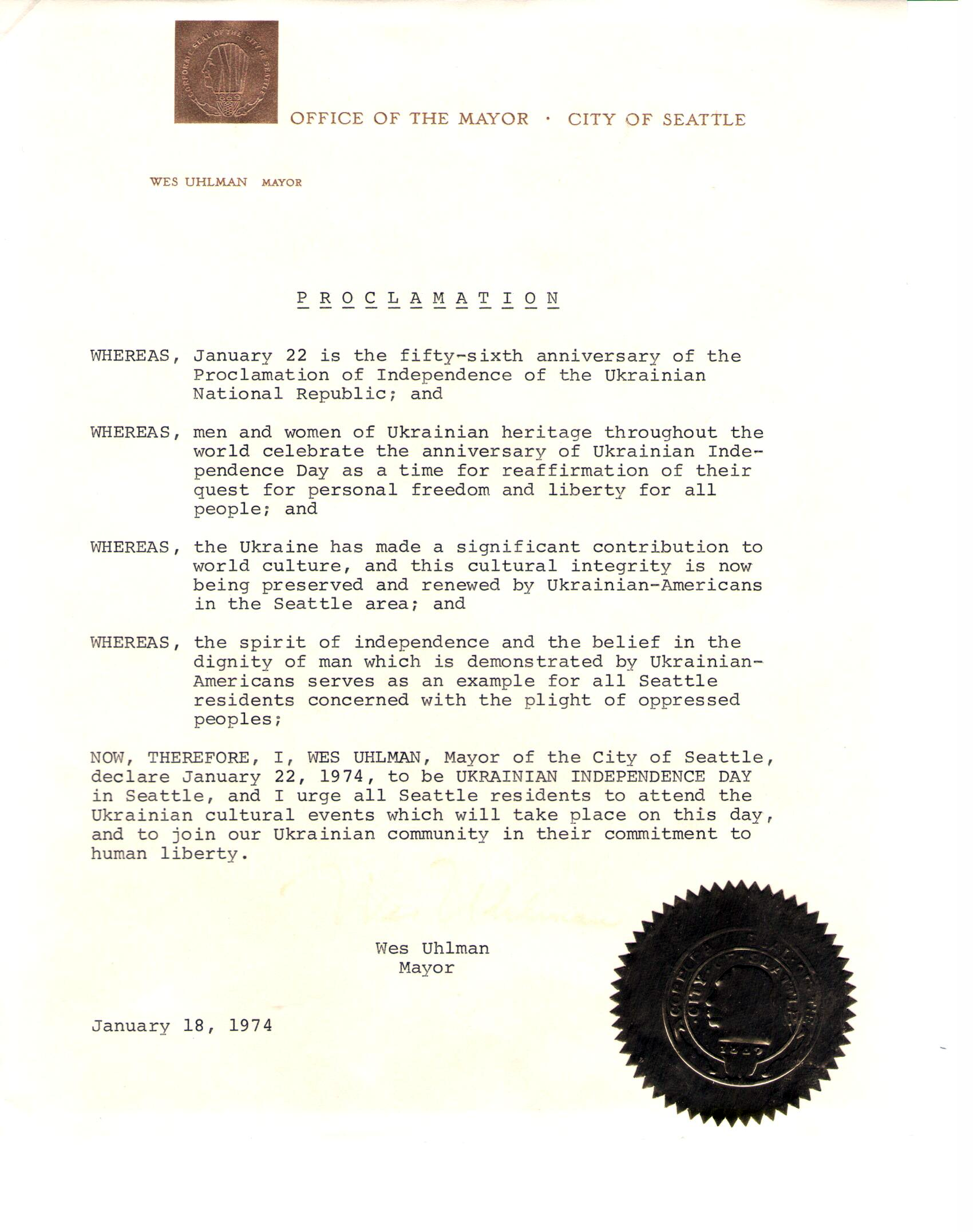
Signed by Wesley C. Uhlman, 1974

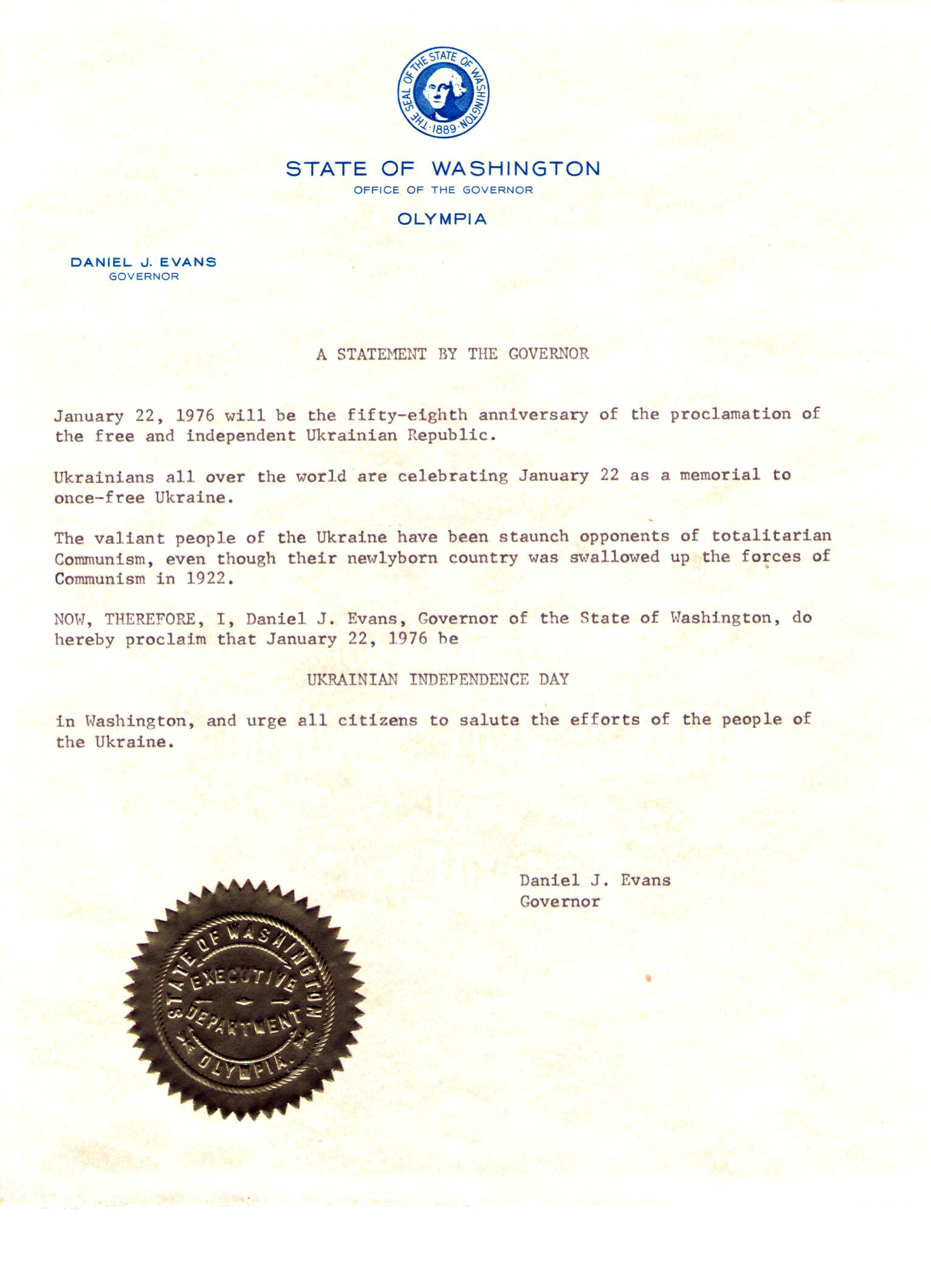
Signed by Daniel J. Evans, 1976

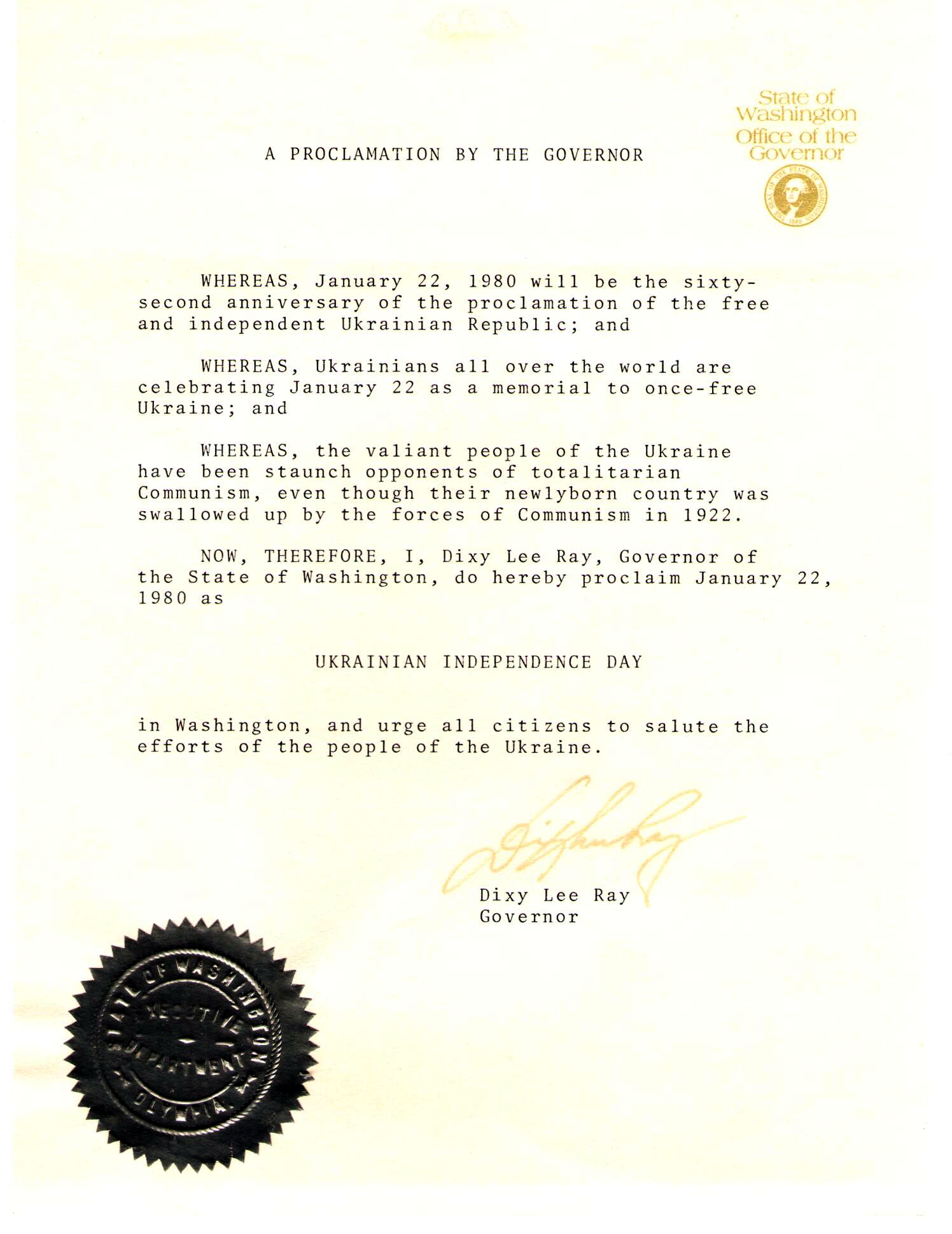
Signed by Dixy Lee Ray, 1980

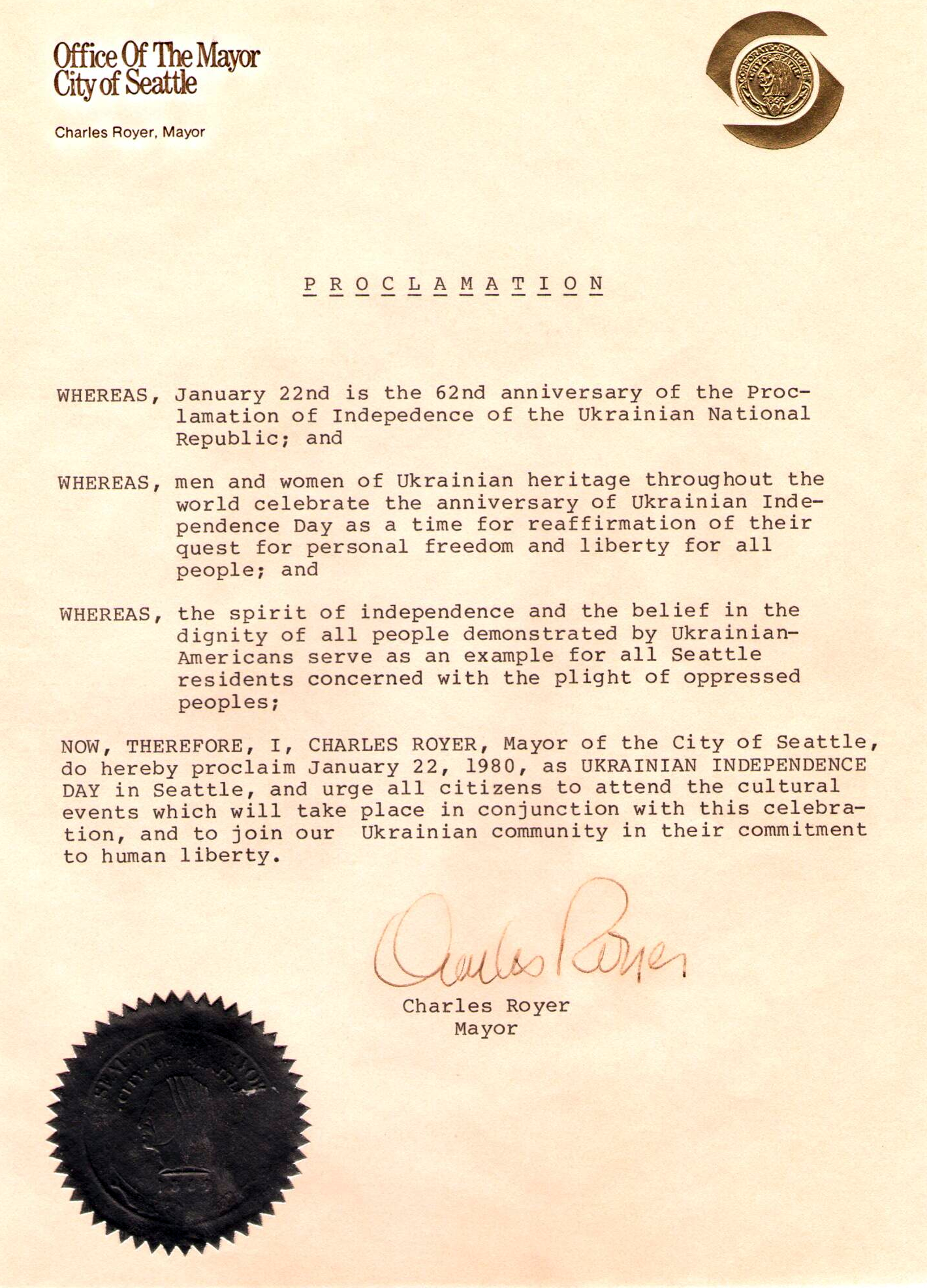
Signed by Charles Royer, 1980

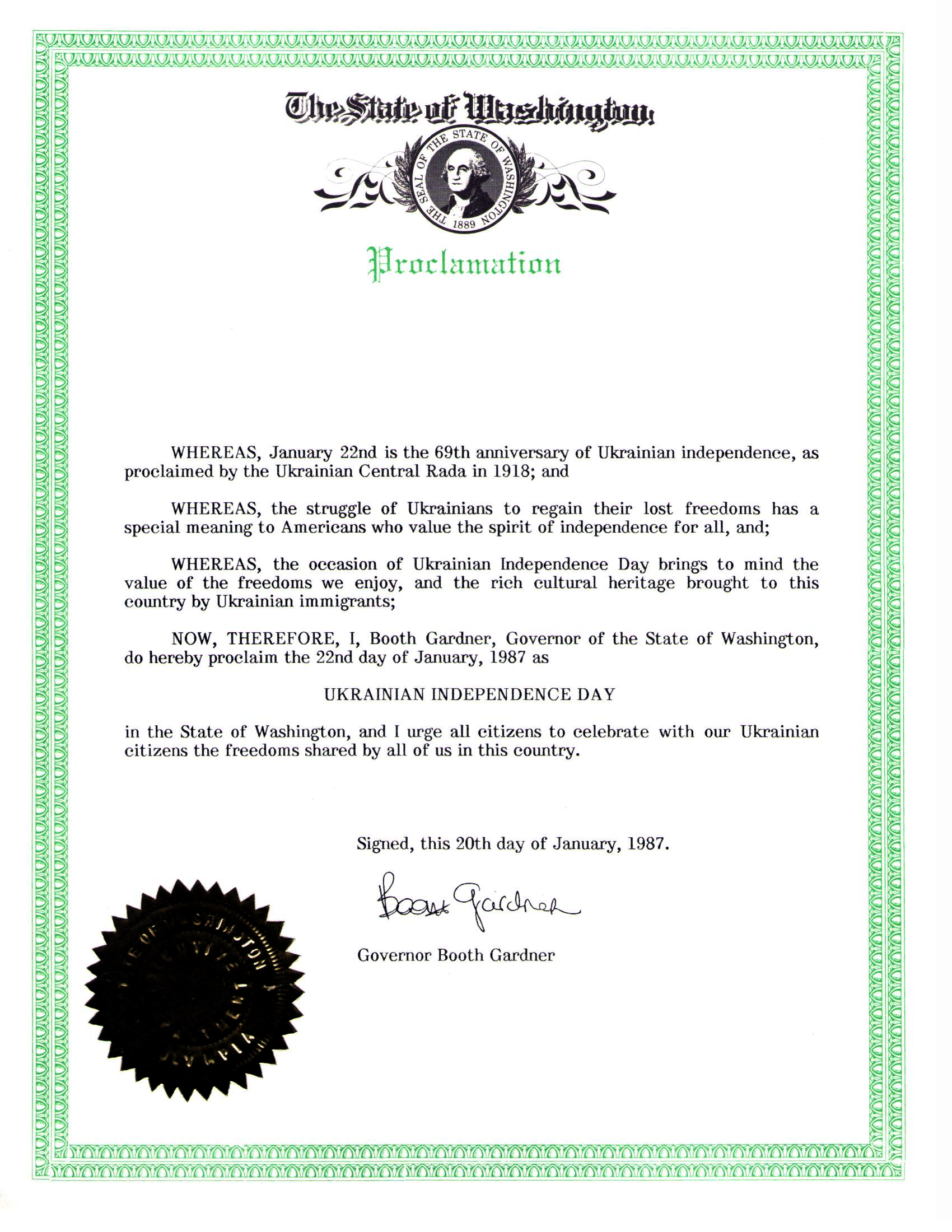
Signed by Booth Gardner, 1987
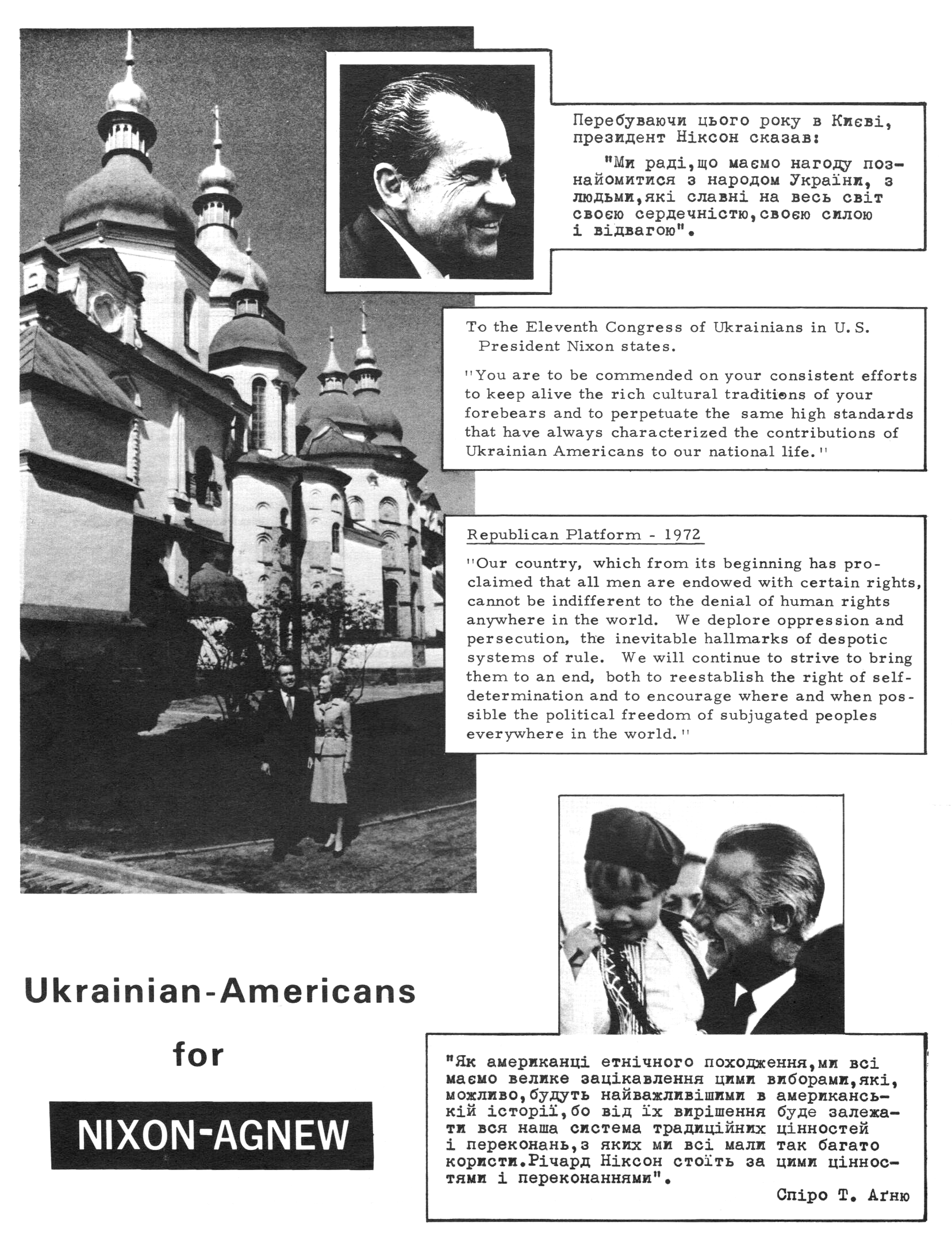
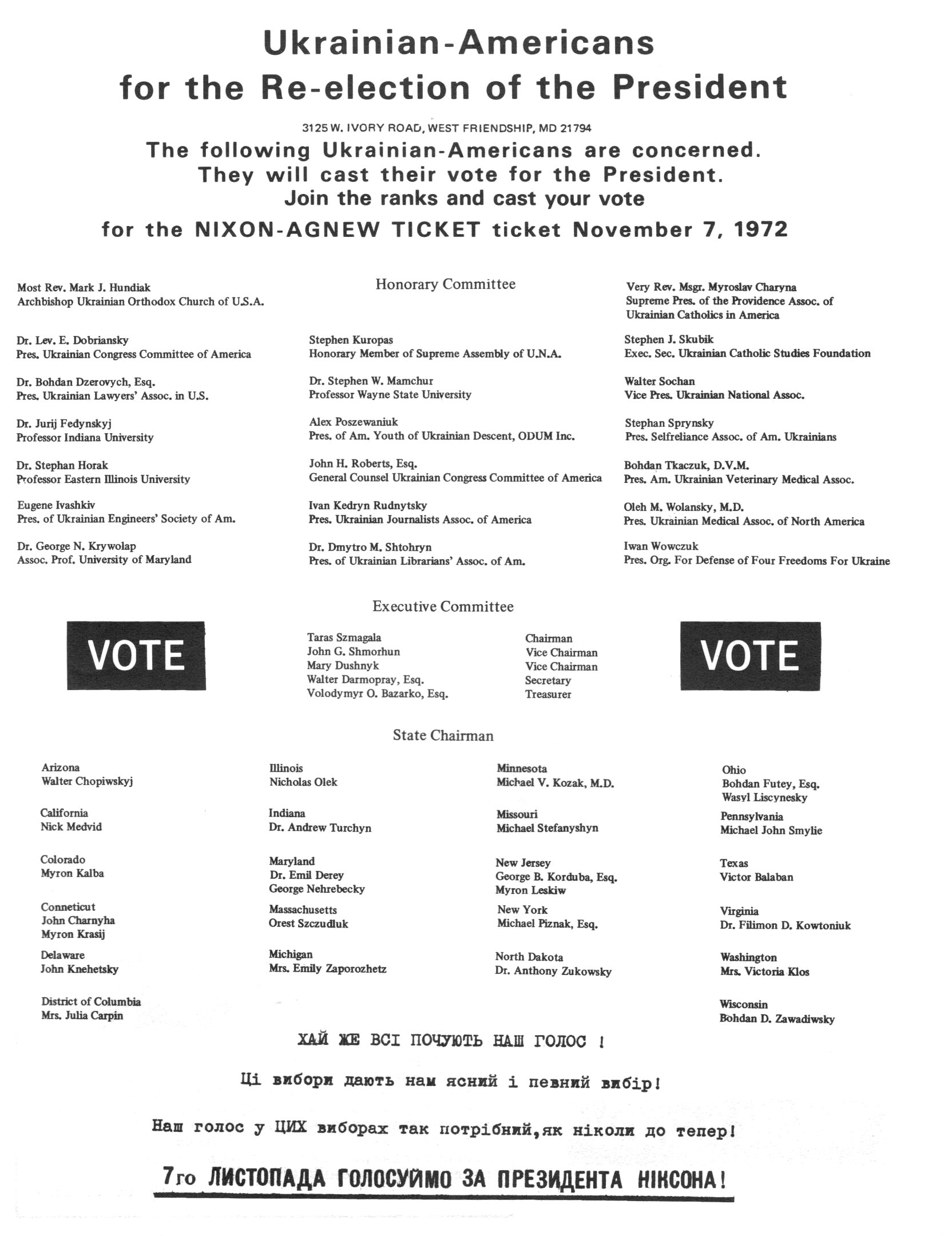
A flyer in support of Richard Nixon printed for the presidential election of 1972

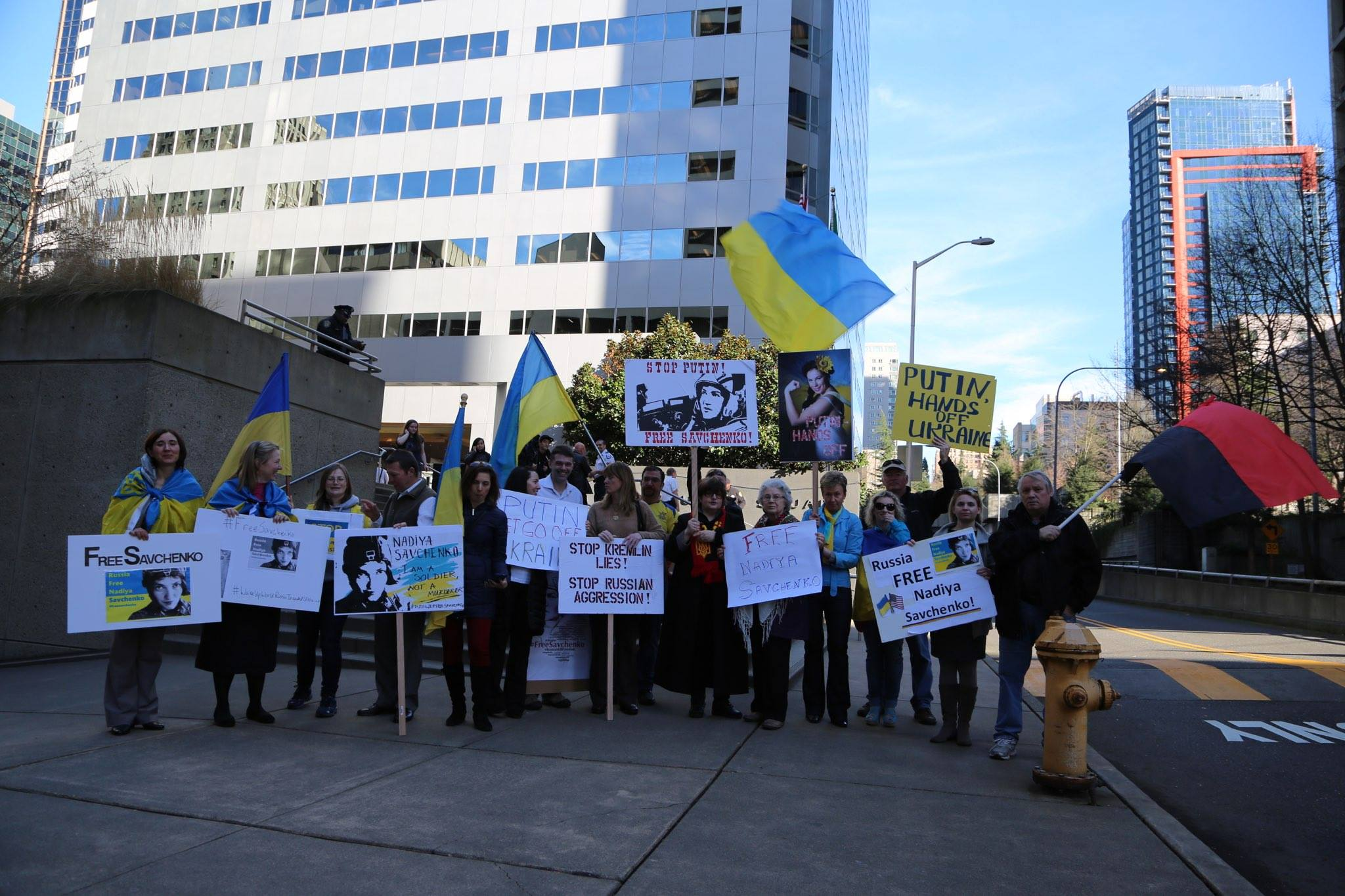
A rally near the Russian Consulate in Seattle in support of freedom for Nadiya Savchenko, 2015

Before Ukraine obtained its independence from the USSR in 1991, the Ukrainian Association of Washington State traditionally supported the Republican Party in the United States because Republicans historically took a harder line towards the USSR regarding "the struggle of the oppressed peoples". In 1973, the representatives of the club took part in Western GOP Conference, where Wolodymyr Klos asked US vice-president Gerald Ford to continue US opposition of the Russification of Ukraine and the persecution of Ukrainian activists in Soviet Ukraine.

The association repeatedly fought for freedom of political prisoners of Ukrainian origin. One of the first such actions was the rally near Soviet Technical Exhibition in Seattle in May 1976, which was jointly organized with local Jewish community. The protesters demanded freedom for Ukrainian journalist Viacheslav Chornovil and Jewish artist Boris Penson who were arrested in USSR. By means of multiple written communications to American Representatives of Congress, and during a personal meeting with US First Lady Betty Ford on October 8, 1976, members of the Association sought freedom for Ukrainian historian Valentyn Moroz.

The 2014–15 Russian military intervention in Ukraine compelled many UAWS members to engage in political activities. In 2014, the association formed a political committee. The committee regularly organized protest rallies in Seattle to stop Russian aggression, free Nadiya Savchenko, and persecute the murderers of Boris Nemtsov, a notorious critic of Russian military intervention into Ukraine. Sometimes these rallies were joined by Russian local activists who also protested against Putin's policies. UAWS is believed to be in the top 20 most politically active Ukrainian organizations in United States.

=== Charitable activities ===
The association regularly raises money for a number of charitable causes, including support of regional cultural events and of different organizations in Ukraine. For example, UAWS raised money for humanitarian aid and first-aid kits for Ukrainian soldiers injured during the war, support of an independent Ukrainian TV channel Hromadske.tv, victims of the Chernobyl disaster, Euromaidan protesters in Kyiv, families of soldiers who died during 2014–15 Russian military intervention in Ukraine, and other causes.

UAWS supports endowments for Ukrainian Studies departments in the US and in Ukraine. Among the beneficiaries are the National University of Kyiv-Mohyla Academy, Harvard University, the University of Washington, Seattle Pacific University, and others.

== See also ==
- Ukrainian diaspora
- Washington state
- Ukrainian communities in the United States
- American Coalition for Ukraine
- Nova Ukraine

== Literature cited ==
- "Ukrainian Association of Washington", washington.edu, Seattle: University of Washington, archived from the original on August 7, 2020
- "Istorija Asociacii' ukrai'nciv shtatu Vashyngton" Історія Асоціації українців штату Вашингтон [History of the Association of Ukrainians in Washington State], uaws.org (in Ukrainian), Kenmore: Ukrainian Association of Washington State, archived from the original on April 19, 2015
- "Kontakty Asociacii' ukrai'nciv shtatu Vashyngton" Контакти Асоціації українців штату Вашингтон [Contacts of the Association of Ukrainians of the State of Washington], uaws.org (in Ukrainian), Kenmore: Ukrainian Association of Washington State, archived from the original on March 19, 2018
- "Christmas Customs at Museum", Seattle Times, Seattle: Frank A. Blethen, p. 25, December 9, 1971, ISSN 0745-9696, LCCN sn83009191, OCLC 9198928
- Snylyk, Zenon, ed. (December 11, 1971), "Form Club in Seattle" (PDF), Svoboda, vol. LXXVIII, no. 229, Jersey City: "Svoboda" Printing Office, p. 3, ISSN 0274-6964, LCCN sn80012518, OCLC 1766932, archived from the original (PDF) on March 4, 2016
- "Shevchenko Day", Seattle Times, Seattle: Frank A. Blethen, March 14, 1972, ISSN 0745-9696, LCCN sn83009191, OCLC 9198928
- "Course in Ukrainian Offered", Bellevue American, Bellevue, January 18, 1973, OCLC 17212567
- Snylyk, Zenon, ed. (February 3, 1973), "Seattle Ukrainians Mark Independence Anniversary" (PDF), Svoboda, vol. LXXX, no. 22, Jersey City: "Svoboda" Printing Office, pp. 1, 3, ISSN 0274-6964, LCCN sn80012518, OCLC 1766932, archived from the original (PDF) on March 4, 2016
- Snylyk, Zenon, ed. (March 3, 1973), "Washington State Marks Independence for the First Time" (PDF), Svoboda, vol. LXXX, no. 40, Jersey City: "Svoboda" Printing Office, p. 3, ISSN 0274-6964, LCCN sn80012518, OCLC 1766932, archived from the original (PDF) on March 4, 2016
- Snylyk, Zenon, ed. (December 15, 1973), "Ukrainians Take Part in Western GOP Conference" (PDF), Svoboda, vol. LXXX, no. 229, Jersey City: "Svoboda" Printing Office, p. 4, ISSN 0274-6964, LCCN sn80012518, OCLC 1766932, archived from the original (PDF) on March 4, 2016
- "Ukrainian Observance Set", Seattle Times, Seattle: Frank A. Blethen, pp. A5, January 20, 1974, ISSN 0745-9696, LCCN sn83009191, OCLC 9198928
- Snylyk, Zenon, ed. (March 9, 1974), "Pacific Northwest Recalls Independence Anniversary" (PDF), Svoboda, vol. LXXXI, no. 46, Jersey City: "Svoboda" Printing Office, p. 3, ISSN 0274-6964, LCCN sn80012518, OCLC 1766932, archived from the original (PDF) on March 4, 2016
- Snylyk, Zenon, ed. (March 15, 1975), "Festival in Seattle Marks Independence Anniversary" (PDF), Svoboda, vol. LXXXII, no. 51, Jersey City: "Svoboda" Printing Office, p. 4, ISSN 0274-6964, LCCN sn80012518, OCLC 1766932, archived from the original (PDF) on March 4, 2016
- Snylyk, Zenon, ed. (October 25, 1975), "Form Bicentennial Board in Washington, Plan Festival" (PDF), Svoboda, vol. LXXXII, no. 201, Jersey City: "Svoboda" Printing Office, p. 2, ISSN 0274-6964, LCCN sn80012518, OCLC 1766932, archived from the original (PDF) on March 4, 2016
- Snylyk, Zenon, ed. (May 22, 1976), "Ukrainians, Jews Picket Soviet Scientific Exhibit" (PDF), Svoboda, vol. LXXXIII, no. 96, Jersey City: "Svoboda" Printing Office, p. 4, ISSN 0274-6964, LCCN sn80012518, OCLC 1766932, archived from the original (PDF) on March 4, 2016
- Snylyk, Zenon, ed. (November 7, 1976), "Ukrainians Greeted First Lady In Washington" (PDF), Svoboda, vol. LXXXIII, no. 125, Jersey City: "Svoboda" Printing Office, p. 3, ISSN 0274-6964, LCCN sn80012518, OCLC 1766932, archived from the original (PDF) on March 4, 2016
- The Bicentennial of the United States of America: a final report to the people, vol. V, Washington: American Revolution Bicentennial Administration, 1977, ISBN 0960123253, LCCN 77071949, OCLC 721068294
- The Bicentennial of the United States of America: a final report to the people, vol. II, Washington: American Revolution Bicentennial Administration, 1977, ISBN 0960123229, LCCN 77071949, OCLC 03087852
- Snylyk, Zenon, ed. (February 19, 1978), "Ukrainian Communities Observe Independence Day" (PDF), Svoboda, vol. LXXXV, no. 39, Jersey City: "Svoboda" Printing Office, p. 8, ISSN 0274-6964, LCCN sn80012518, OCLC 1766932, archived from the original (PDF) on March 4, 2016
- Bud, Bard, ed. (1981), Contact: Ethnic Heritage Directory, vol. 1 (3 ed.), Seattle: Ethnic Heritage Council, OCLC 08267715
- Bud, Bard, ed. (1981), Contact: Ethnic Heritage Directory, vol. 2 (3 ed.), Seattle: Ethnic Heritage Council, OCLC 08267715
- Hadzewycz, Roma, ed. (October 24, 1982), "Seattle residents protest pipeline" (PDF), The Ukrainian Weekly, vol. 1, no. 43, Jersey City: Ukrainian National Association, p. 4, ISSN 0273-9348, LCCN sc82006109, OCLC 7042061, archived from the original (PDF) on March 4, 2016
- Contact: a directory of ethnic organizations in Washington State, Seattle: Ethnic Heritage Council, 1990, ISBN 0962794201, OCLC 22980079
- Hadzewycz, Roma, ed. (May 20, 1990), "Preview of Events" (PDF), The Ukrainian Weekly, vol. LVIII, no. 20, Jersey City: Ukrainian National Association, p. 16, ISSN 0273-9348, LCCN sc82006109, OCLC 7042061, archived from the original (PDF) on March 4, 2016
- Contact: a directory of ethnic organizations in Washington State (3 ed.), Seattle: Ethnic Heritage Council, 1995, ISBN 096279421X, OCLC 33385702
- "In their own world", Seattle Post-Intelligencer, Seattle: The Hearst Corporation, pp. B3, December 15, 2004, ISSN 0745-970X, LCCN sn83045605, OCLC 3734418
- "Smoloskyp Golodomoru u Sietli" Смолоскип Голодомору у Сіетлі [The Holodomor Torch in Seattle], Dzherelo. The Ukrainian Monthly Magazine Джерело. The Ukrainian Monthly Magazine [Source. The Ukrainian Monthly Magazine] (in Ukrainian), vol. 193, no. 12, Everett: Djerelo, pp. 6–8, 2008
- "Zhyttja Gromady" Життя Громади [Community Life], Dzherelo. The Ukrainian Monthly Magazine Джерело. The Ukrainian Monthly Magazine [Source. The Ukrainian Monthly Magazine] (in Ukrainian), vol. 192, no. 11, Everett: Djerelo, p. 12, 2008
- "Prosym Dveri Vidkryvaty – koljadnyky pryjshly do haty!" Просим Двері Відкривати – колядники прийшли до хати! [Please open the door - the carolers have come to the house!], Dzherelo. The Ukrainian Monthly Magazine Джерело. The Ukrainian Monthly Magazine [Source. The Ukrainian Monthly Magazine] (in Ukrainian), vol. 197, no. 1, Everett: Djerelo, p. 25, 2009
- "Local Ukrainians react to Russian military action", KING 5, Tysons: Tegna Inc., March 1, 2014, OCLC 1097144035, archived from the original on March 10, 2016
- "Rejtyng najpopuljarnishyh ukrai'ns'kyh organizacij u SShA" Рейтинг найпопулярніших українських організацій у США [Ranking of the most popular Ukrainian organizations in the United States], Ukrainian Chicago Magazine (in Ukrainian), vol. I, no. 1, Chicago: Vidia, pp. 36–39, January 1, 2015, ISSN 2378-5888, LCCN 2015202420, OCLC 907549893
- Andrijchenko, Dmytro, ed. (January 27, 2015), "#FreeSavchenko: ukrai'nci vymagaly svobody polonenij l'otchyci pid genkonsul'stvom Rosii' v SShA (16 foto)" #FreeSavchenko: українці вимагали свободи полоненій льотчиці під генконсульством Росії в США (16 фото) [#FreeSavchenko: Ukrainians demand freedom of captive pilot under Russian Consulate General in the USA (16 photos)], TSN.UA (in Ukrainian), Kyiv: 1+1 Media Group
- "Ukrai'nci shtatu Vashyngton pryjmaly ukrai'ns'ki rodyny zagyblyh geroi'v ATO" Українці штату Вашингтон приймали українські родини загиблих героїв АТО [Ukrainians of the Washington State received the Ukrainian families of the fallen heroes of anti-terrorist operation], uapost.us, Chicago: UaPost, February 17, 2015, archived from the original on April 14, 2015
- Danysh, Orest (January 17, 1976), Snylyk, Zenon (ed.), "Seattle Youth Stage "Christmas in Ukraine"" (PDF), Svoboda, vol. LXXXIII, no. 11, Jersey City: "Svoboda" Printing Office, p. 3, ISSN 0274-6964, LCCN sn80012518, OCLC 1766932, archived from the original (PDF) on March 4, 2016
- Daza, Rosario (November 27, 2004), "Ukrainian Election Stirs Local Immigrants", Seattle Times, Seattle: Frank A. Blethen, pp. B1, B6, ISSN 0745-9696, LCCN sn83009191, OCLC 9198928
- Iwasaki, John (November 27, 2004), "Ukraine drama closely watched - most emigres in", Seattle Post-Intelligencer, Seattle: The Hearst Corporation, pp. B1, ISSN 0745-970X, LCCN sn83045605, OCLC 3734418
- Jones, Liz (April 17, 2014), Strachan, Jennifer (ed.), "Ukrainians In Seattle React To Crisis Back Home", KUOW, Seattle: University of Washington
- Lemcio, Eugene (September 25, 1994), Hadzewycz, Roma (ed.), "Washington State Commemoration. A Study in Unity." (PDF), The Ukrainian Weekly, vol. LXII, no. 43, Jersey City: Ukrainian National Association, pp. 4, 13, ISSN 0273-9348, LCCN sc82006109, OCLC 7042061, archived from the original (PDF) on March 4, 2016
- Lemcio, Eugene (November 19, 1995), Hadzewycz, Roma (ed.), "A Look at the Fourth Immigration" (PDF), The Ukrainian Weekly, vol. LXIII, no. 47, Jersey City: Ukrainian National Association, pp. 6, 17, ISSN 0273-9348, LCCN sc82006109, OCLC 7042061, archived from the original (PDF) on December 29, 2017
- Lemcio, Eugene (June 1, 2008), Hadzewycz, Roma (ed.), "Holodomor Flame in Washington State" (PDF), The Ukrainian Weekly, vol. LXXVI, no. 22, Jersey City: Ukrainian National Association, p. 8, ISSN 0273-9348, LCCN sc82006109, OCLC 7042061, archived from the original (PDF) on March 4, 2016
- Lewis, Paul (January 11, 1982), "US Asks its Allies to Deny to Soviet Parts for Pipeline", New York Times, New York, ISSN 1553-8095, LCCN sn00061556, OCLC 34107580
- Mygovych, Volodymyr (May 16, 2008), Hadzewycz, Roma (ed.), ""Nezgasyma svichka": Sijetl – San-Francisko – Los-Andzheles" "Незгасима свічка": Сієтл – Сан-Франціско – Лос-Анджелес ["Inextinguishable candle": Seattle - San Francisco - Los Angeles] (PDF), Svoboda (in Ukrainian), vol. CXV, no. 20, Parsippany: Ukrainian National Association, p. 1, ISSN 0274-6964, LCCN sn80012518, OCLC 1766932
- Nelson, Gladys (January 5, 1972), ""Holy Supper" for Seattle Ukrainians", Seattle Times, Seattle: Frank A. Blethen, pp. E2, ISSN 0745-9696, LCCN sn83009191, OCLC 9198928
- Olexy, Tamara (May 11, 2008), Hadzewycz, Roma (ed.), "Holodomor Remembrance Flame enters U.S." (PDF), The Ukrainian Weekly, vol. LXXVI, no. 19, Jersey City: Ukrainian National Association, pp. 1, 11, ISSN 0273-9348, LCCN sc82006109, OCLC 7042061, archived from the original (PDF) on March 4, 2016
- Ostrom, Carol M. (December 3, 1991), "Ukrainian americans celebrate a dream come true", Seattle Times, Seattle: Frank A. Blethen, pp. A6, ISSN 0745-9696, LCCN sn83009191, OCLC 9198928
- Prokipchuk, Lesja (October 12, 2007), Hadzewycz, Roma (ed.), "Na vyborchyh dil'nycjah Ameryky" На виборчих дільницях Америки [At polling stations in America] (PDF), Svoboda (in Ukrainian), vol. CXIV, no. 41, Parsippany: Ukrainian National Association, p. 9, ISSN 0274-6964, LCCN sn80012518, OCLC 1766932
- Shadyrja, Julja; Shadyrja, Tetjana (2010), "Barvinok: Novi Dosjagnennja, novi trofei'" Барвінок: Нові Досягнення, нові трофеї [A periwinkle: new achievements, new trophies], Dzherelo. The Ukrainian Monthly Magazine Джерело. The Ukrainian Monthly Magazine [Source. The Ukrainian Monthly Magazine] (in Ukrainian), vol. 208, no. 4, Everett: Djerelo, pp. 14–15
- Shevchenko, Marija (September 28, 2001), Hadzewycz, Roma (ed.), "Nacional'ne vyhovannja pochynajet'sja z pisni i tancju" Національне виховання починається з пісні і танцю [National upbringing begins with song and dance] (PDF), Svoboda (in Ukrainian), vol. CVIII, no. 39, Parsippany: Ukrainian National Association, p. 16, ISSN 0274-6964, LCCN sn80012518, OCLC 1766932
- Slymak, Motria (March 6, 1976), Snylyk, Zenon (ed.), "Seattle Ukrainians Stage Impressive Festival" (PDF), Svoboda, vol. LXXXIII, no. 43, Jersey City: "Svoboda" Printing Office, pp. 1, 3, ISSN 0274-6964, LCCN sn80012518, OCLC 1766932, archived from the original (PDF) on March 4, 2016
- Sovenko, Kseniya (March 20, 2015), Stonehill, Alex (ed.), "Ukrainian association pivots from promoting culture to protecting lives", seattleglobalist.com, Seattle: Seattle Globalist, archived from the original on March 24, 2015
- Stuteville, Sarah (February 24, 2014), Shelton, Don (ed.), "To Local Ukrainians, the Enemy is Corruption", Seattle Times, Seattle: Frank A. Blethen, ISSN 0745-9696, LCCN sn83009191, OCLC 9198928
- Tizon, Alex (September 5, 1999), "Ukrainians share joys, pains of life in u.s. – 5", Seattle Times, Seattle: Frank A. Blethen, pp. B1, ISSN 0745-9696, LCCN sn83009191, OCLC 9198928
- Volchkova, Galyna (November 26, 2004), "Nam ne bajduzha dolja Ukrai'ny" Нам не байдужа доля України [We are not indifferent to the fate of Ukraine], Dzherelo. The Ukrainian Monthly Magazine Джерело. The Ukrainian Monthly Magazine [Source. The Ukrainian Monthly Magazine] (in Ukrainian), vol. 23, Everett: Djerelo, pp. 3–4
- Volchkova, Galyna (December 2, 2005), "Podarujte Ditjam Skarb – Ukrai'nu" Подаруйте Дітям Скарб – Україну [Give children a treasure - Ukraine], Dzherelo. The Ukrainian Monthly Magazine Джерело. The Ukrainian Monthly Magazine [Source. The Ukrainian Monthly Magazine] (in Ukrainian), Everett: Djerelo, pp. 8–9
- Volchkova, Galyna (2010), "Zhyttja Gromady" Життя Громади [Community life], Dzherelo. The Ukrainian Monthly Magazine Джерело. The Ukrainian Monthly Magazine [Source. The Ukrainian Monthly Magazine] (in Ukrainian), vol. 208, no. 4, Everett: Djerelo, pp. 8–11
