= Ukrainian Canadian Civil Liberties Association =

Ukrainian organization in Canada

The Ukrainian Canadian Civil Liberties Association (UCCLA) (French: L'Association ukrainienne-canadienne des droits civils (AU-CDC)) is a Ukrainian organization in Canada. Established after the Civil Liberties Commission (affiliated with the Ukrainian Canadian Congress) was disbanded, its members – all of whom are volunteers – have been particularly active in championing the cause of recognition, restitution and reconciliation with respect to Canada's first national internment operations, helping secure a redress settlement in 2008 with the Government of Canada along with the Ukrainian Canadian Congress and the Taras Shevchenko Foundation. They have also challenged claims of the presence of Nazi war criminals hiding in Canada, and documented the presence of veterans of the NKVD, SMERSH, and KGB in Canada. The first chairman of the CLC/UCCLA was John B. Gregorovich, a lawyer. The last chairman was Roman Zakaluzny. He resigned in September 2024. The immediate past president, and UCCLA's last founding member, was Dr Lubomyr Luciuk, who resigned from UCCLA on 6 November 2024.

UCCLA's members met annually during conclaves held in different cities across the country, often co-ordinating their meeting dates with the unveiling of trilingual historical markers commemorating the internment operations at different camp locations or otherwise recalling important individuals or events in Ukrainian and Ukrainian Canadian history. The association and its supporters have also placed two dozen trilingual markers and four statues across Canada, in Ukraine and in France honouring the Ukrainian Canadian Victoria Cross recipient, Cpl Filip Konowal; recalling the contributions of Ukrainian Canadian servicemen and women during the Second World War (London, England); and honouring the Welsh journalist, Gareth Jones, reported on the famine of 1932–33. UCCLA has also commissioned a number of articles and books that have been distributed internationally dealing with the famine, Anglo-American perspectives on the question of Ukraine's independence, the Ukrainian nationalist movement before, during and after the Second World War, and Soviet military operations. In 2003–2004, UCCLA campaigned to have the 1932 Pulitzer Prize of Walter Duranty, the New York Times correspondent in Moscow from 1922 to 1934, revoked. Duranty wrote in 1933, during the Great Famine, that "there was no famine" and criticized articles by other Western journalists as "failed predictions of doom for the Soviets".

In 2010 UCCLA strove to ensure that all 12 galleries in the publicly funded Canadian Museum for Human Rights were thematic, comparative and inclusive – rather than elevating the suffering of any one or two communities above all others. To that end the association distributed thousands of protest postcards nationally and published a notice raising their concerns in The Hill Times (31 January 2011). Some of UCCLA's critics have tried to censure or even call for the silencing of its voice in the public debate over the proposed contents and governance of the tax payer funded Canadian Museum for Human Rights. One of UCCLA's other recent campaigns (February 2016) involved an appeal to the then-Minister of Canadian Heritage, the Honourable Mélanie Joly, requesting her intervention to help save and re-consecrate the internment camp cemetery at Spirit Lake (La Ferme), Quebec. That internee cemetery remains abandoned and in ever-deteriorating condition, despite being a unique Canadian historical site.

UCCLA was a volunteer organization supported by the donations and efforts of thousands of Canadians of Ukrainian heritage.

== UCCLA-supported publications ==
Some of the books and pamphlets published with the support of the UCCLA include:

- Lubomyr Luciuk, Operation Payback: Soviet Disinformation and Alleged Nazi War Criminals in Canada (Kashtan Press, 2022)
- Luciuk, Lubomyr (2006). Without Just Cause: Canada's First National Internment Operations and the Ukrainian Canadians, 1914-1920. Kingston, Ont.: Kashtan Press.
- Luciuk, Lubomyr (2001). In Fear of the Barbed Wire Fence: Canada's First National Internment Operations and the Ukrainian Canadians, 1914-1920. Kingston, Ont.: Kashtan Press.
- Lubomyr Luciuk and Ron Sorobey, Konowal: A Canadian Hero (Kingston, Ont.: Kashtan Press, 2000)
- Luciuk, Lubomyr; Yurieva, Natalka; Zakaluzny, Roman (1999). Roll Call: Lest We Forget (PDF). [Kingston?]: UCCLA. Archived from the original (PDF) on July 6, 2011.
- Luciuk, Lubomyr; Sydoruk, Borys, eds. (1997). In My Charge: The Canadian Internment Camp Photographs of Sergeant William Buck. Kingston, Ont.: Kashtan Press.
- Luciuk, Lubomyr, ed. (1994). Righting An Injustice: The Debate Over Redress for Canada's First National Internment Operations. Toronto: Justinian Press.
- Gregorovich, John B, ed. (1994). Commemorating An Injustice: Fort Henry and Ukrainian Canadians as "enemy aliens" during the First World War. Toronto: UCCLA.
- Luciuk, Lubomyr (1988). A Time For Atonement: Canada's First National Internment Operations and the Ukrainian Canadians, 1914-1920. Kingston, Ont.: Limestone Press.

== See also ==
- Ukrainian Canadians – Politics and History sections
- Ukrainian Canadian internment
- Filip Konowal
- Political repression in the Soviet Union
- Reversal of Ukrainization policies in Soviet Ukraine
- Gulag
- NKVD
- Holocaust in Ukraine
- World War II German war crimes in the Soviet Union
- Forced labour under German rule during World War II
- Mass graves in the Soviet Union
- Soviet war crimes
- SMERSH
- MGB
- Population transfer in the Soviet Union
- Mass killings under Communist regimes

== Sources ==
- Guly, Christopher (Jan 24, 1993). "UCC attempt to disband Civil Liberties Commission raises hackles". The Ukrainian Weekly. Jersey City, N.J.: Ukrainian National Association. pp. 4 & 17.
- Hadzewycz, Roma, ed. (Sep 4, 2005). "Agreement in principle on redress for internment is announced in Canada" (PDF). The Ukrainian Weekly. Parsippany, N.J.: Ukrainian National Association. pp. 1 & 4. Archived from the original (PDF) on March 1, 2012.
- Luciuk, Lubomyr (Sep 11, 2005). "For the record: Ukrainian Canadians no longer 'in fear of the barbed wire fence'". The Ukrainian Weekly. Parsippany, N.J.: Ukrainian National Association. pp. 6 & 14.
- Martin, Paul (Sep 11, 2005). "For the record: Prime minister's remarks at signing of agreement in principle on redress". The Ukrainian Weekly. Parsippany, N.J.: Ukrainian National Association. pp. 6 & 18.
- Guly, Christopher (Feb 18, 1996). "Book on alleged war criminals creates controversy in Canada". The Ukrainian Weekly. Jersey City, N.J.: Ukrainian National Association. p. 4.
- Hadzewycz, Roma, ed. (Feb 18, 1996). "UCCLA reacts to Koziy developments" (PDF). The Ukrainian Weekly. Jersey City, N.J.: Ukrainian National Association. pp. 4 & 15. Archived from the original (PDF) on March 1, 2012.
- Luciuk, Lubomyr; Yurieva, Natalka; Zakaluzny, Roman (1999). Roll Call: Lest We Forget (PDF). [Kingston?]: UCCLA. Archived from the original (PDF) on July 6, 2011. (Internment booklet)
- Hadzewycz, Roma, ed. (Nov 8, 2009). "UCCLA unveils 21st plaque in memory of internment operations" (PDF). The Ukrainian Weekly. Parsippany, N.J.: Ukrainian National Association. pp. 1 & 18. Archived from the original (PDF) on March 1, 2012.
- Hadzewycz, Roma, ed. (Jan 7, 2001). "Ukrainians in Canada: making their voices heard" (PDF). The Ukrainian Weekly. Parsippany, N.J.: Ukrainian National Association. pp. 24 & 25. Archived from the original (PDF) on March 1, 2012.
- Guly, Christopher (July 28, 1996). "Canada recalls World War I" (PDF). The Ukrainian Weekly. Jersey City, N.J.: Ukrainian National Association. pp. 8 & 13. Archived from the original (PDF) on March 1, 2012.
- Lemieszewski, Stefan (June 29, 1997). "Trilingual plaque in Vancouver honours two Victoria Cross recipients". The Ukrainian Weekly. Parsippany, N.J.: Ukrainian National Association. pp. 8 & 18.
- Hadzewycz, Roma, ed. (Sep 10, 2000). "Over 1,000 in Ukraine witness unveiling of Konowal memorial" (PDF). The Ukrainian Weekly. Parsippany, N.J.: Ukrainian National Association. p. 4. Archived from the original (PDF) on March 1, 2012.
- Hadzewycz, Roma, ed. (Aug 28, 2005). "Filip Konowal honored in France, at site of his World War I heroism" (PDF). The Ukrainian Weekly. Parsippany, N.J.: Ukrainian National Association. pp. 1 & 20. Archived from the original (PDF) on March 1, 2012.
- Lubomyr Luciuk and Ron Sorobey, Konowal: A Canadian Hero (Kingston, Ont.: Kashtan Press, 2000)
- Hadzewycz, Roma, ed. (Aug 27, 1995). "Memorial recalls Canadian soldiers" (PDF). The Ukrainian Weekly. Jersey City, N.J.: Ukrainian National Association. p. 7. Archived from the original (PDF) on March 1, 2012.
- Hadzewycz, Roma, ed. (Dec 31, 1995). "The noteworthy: events and people" (PDF). The Ukrainian Weekly. Jersey City, N.J.: Ukrainian National Association. p. 20. Archived from the original (PDF) on March 1, 2012.
- "Should this Pulitzer be pulled? Seventy years after a government-engineered famine killed millions in Ukraine, a New York Times correspondent who failed to sound the alarm is under attack". Columbia Journalism Review. 42 (4). New York: Columbia University: 43(6). Nov–Dec 2003.
- Redressing history's horrors.(Enemy aliens, Prisoners of War and In Fear of the Barbed Wire Fence; bibliography). The Beaver: Exploring Canada's History 83.2 (April–May 2003): p54(2). (1112 words)
- "Doubts Over a Pulitzer. (Letter to the Editor)". The New York Times. Oct 28, 2003. p. A24, col 04 (3 col).
