= UCCLA =

UCCLA may refer to:

- Ukrainian Canadian Civil Liberties Association
- União das Cidades Capitais Luso-Afro-Américo-Asiáticas
