= Lubomyr Luciuk =

Canadian academic and author

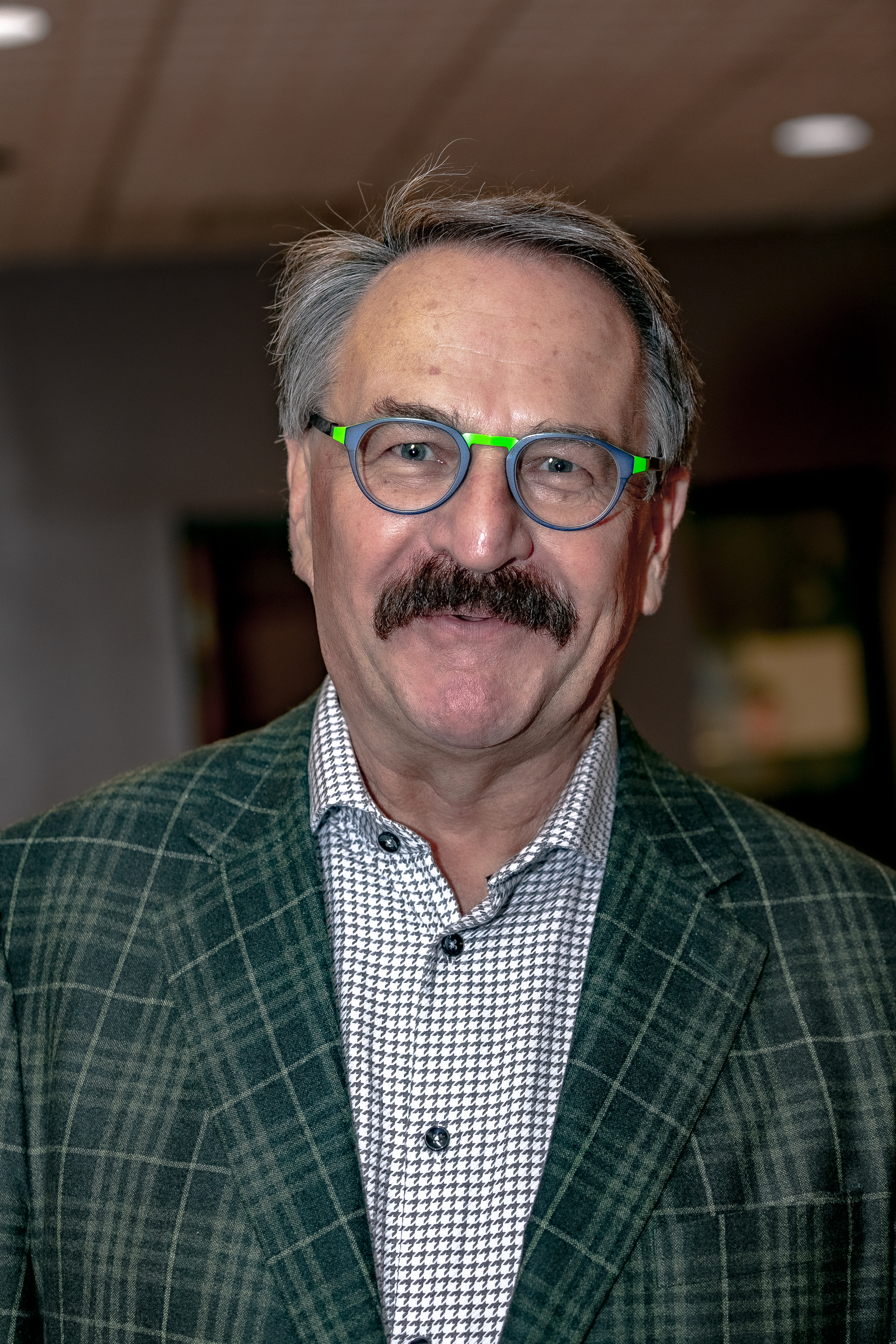
- Luciuk in 2022
- Born: Lubomyr Yaroslav Luciuk; July 9, 1953 (age 73); Kingston, Ontario, Canada
- Occupations: Professor, author
- Years active: 1980–present
- Awards: Shevchenko Medal

Lubomyr Yaroslav Luciuk (born July 9, 1953) is a Canadian academic and author of books and articles in the field of political geography and Ukrainian history. Until January 2025 he was a full professor at the Royal Military College of Canada. He is a Senior Research Fellow of the Chair of Ukrainian Studies at the University of Toronto and Professor Emeritus of The Royal Military College of Canada.

== Background and education ==
Luciuk was born and raised in Kingston, Ontario. He earned two degrees from Queen's University, an Honours BSc (1976) and MA (1979), and completed his PhD (1984) at the University of Alberta. He had postdoctoral fellowships at the University of Toronto and Queen's University.

== Political and academic work ==
Luciuk served as a part-time member of the Parole Board of Canada from 2013 to April 2016.

Until 6 November 2024 he was a member of the Ukrainian Canadian Civil Liberties Association.

He was a full professor of Political Geography in the Department of Political Science and Economics at the Royal Military College of Canada, in Kingston, retiring on 17 January 2025.

In August 2026, he was appointed to the Expert Council advising the National Museum of the Holodomor-Genocide, in Kyiv, Ukraine.

== Awards ==
In 2010, Luciuk was one of 16 recipients of the Shevchenko Medal of the Ukrainian Canadian Congress in recognition of his educational, research and advocacy efforts on behalf of the Ukrainian Canadian community. He was awarded the Cross of Ivan Mazepa by Ukrainian president Volodymyr Zelenskyy in 2019, and was declared a persona non grata by the Russian Federation in April 2022.

== Publications ==
Luciuk specializes in the political geography of Eastern Europe and the former Soviet Union, refugee studies, and the ethnic and immigration history of Canada. He is the author or editor/co-editor of 32 publications, including In Fear of the Barbed Wire Fence: Canada's First National Internment Operations, Searching for Place: Ukrainian Displaced Persons, Canada, and Migration of Memory, and Konowal: A Canadian Hero; and over 200 editorials in Canadian newspapers.

=== Books authored/edited/compiled by Luciuk ===
- "Holodomor: Understanding the Great Famine of 1932-1934 in Soviet Ukraine," Kingston: The Kashtan Press/Chair of Ukrainian Studies, 2026 (co-edited with Oleh Wolowyna).
- "A Very Delicate Matter: The Vatican and the Galicia Division, 1942-1956," Kingston: The Kashtan Press, 2026 (co-edited with Athanasius D. McVay).
- "I Have Finished My Course," Kingston: The Kashtan Press, 2025
- Cui Bono? Who Benefits?, Kingston: The Kashtan Press, 2024
- The Galicia Division: They Fought for Ukraine, Kingston: The Kashtan Press, 2023 (Ukrainian edition, 2025)
- Lest They Forget, Kingston: The Kashtan Press, 2023
- Enemy Archives: Soviet Counterinsurgency Operations and the Ukrainian Nationalist Movement, Kingston: Montreal, McGill-Queen's University Press, 2023 (co-edited with Volodymyr Viatrovych). Reprinted in 2024.
- Operation Payback: Soviet Disinformation and Alleged Nazi War Criminals in North America, The Kashtan Press, 2022.
- A few words about my life: The Recollections of Rev Dr J C E Riotte, Kingston: Kashtan Press, 2021
- Famines in European Economic History: The last great European famines reconsidered, 2015, Routledge, 2015 (with D Curran and A G Newby, co-eds)
- Luciuk, Lubomyr Y. (2004). Not worthy : Walter Duranty's Pulitzer Prize and the New York Times. Kingston, Ont.: Kashtan Press. ISBN 1-896354-34-3.
- Ukrainians in the Making: Their Kingston Story, The Limestone Press, 1980
- A Delicate and Difficult Question: Documents in the History of Ukrainians in Canada, 1899–1962, The Limestone Press, 1986, with B. S. Kordan
- Anglo-American Perspectives on the Ukrainian Question, 1938–1951, The Limestone Press, 1987, with B. S. Kordan
- Canada's Ukrainians: Negotiating an Identity, University of Toronto Press, 1991 (with Stella Hryniuk)
- Searching for Place: Ukrainian Displaced Persons, Canada and the Migration of Memory (University of Toronto Press, 2000)
- Creating a Landscape: A Geography of Ukrainians in Canada (University of Toronto Press, 1989), with B. S. Kordan
- In Fear of the Barbed Wire Fence: Canada's First National Internment Operations and the Ukrainian Canadians, 1914–1920, Kashtan Press, 2001.
- A Time for Atonement: Canada's First National Internment Operations, 1914–1920 (Kingston, Ontario: Limestone Press, 1988)
- Their Just War: Images of the Ukrainian Insurgent Army (Kingston, Ont: Kashtan Press, 2007) with Wasyl Humeniuk
- The Foreign Office and the Famine: British Documents on Ukraine and the Great Famine of 1932–1933 (Kingston, Ontario: Limestone Press, 1988), with M Carynnyk & B S Kordan (co eds)
- Righting an Injustice: The Debate over Redress for Canada's First National Internment Operations, Justinian Press, 1994
- Holodomor: Reflections on the Great Famine of 1932–1933 in Soviet Ukraine (Kingston, Ontario: Kashtan Press, 2008)
- The Holy See and the Holodomor: Documents from the Vatican Secret Archives on the Great Famine of 1932–1933 in Soviet Ukraine, with Athanasius McVay (University of Toronto, Chair of Ukrainian Studies & Kashtan Press, 2011)
- Jews, Ukrainians, and the Euromaidan, (Chair of Ukrainian Studies in association with the Kashtan Press, 2014)
- Tell Them We Are Starving: The 1933 Dairies of Gareth Jones (Kashtan Press, 2016)
- How People Live in Soviet Russia, by Mendel Osherowitch (Chair of Ukrainian Studies in association with the Kashtan Press, 2020)
