= Impeachment in Ukraine =

Political procedure in Ukraine

Impeachment in Ukraine is an expressed power of Ukraine's national legislature, the Verkhovna Rada, that allows for formal charges to be brought against the country's president. Article 111 of the Ukrainian Constitution states that "The President of Ukraine may be removed from office ... by the majority of the constitutional composition of the ... Verkhovna Rada of Ukraine by the procedure of impeachment, in the event that he or she commits state treason or other crime."

Members of the Verkhovna Rada, known as People's Deputies of Ukraine, can also be removed by impeachment.

== Procedure ==
The impeachment procedure is initiated by a majority vote in the Verkhovna Rada. To conduct the impeachment investigation, the Rada establishes a special temporary investigatory commission, whose composition includes a special prosecutor and special investigators. The conclusions and proposals of the commission are then considered at a meeting of the Rada, which will vote on whether to adopt the accusations; a two-thirds vote is needed to proceed. The charges are then reviewed by the Constitutional Court of Ukraine as well as the Supreme Court of Ukraine; the former rules whether the investigation properly observed constitutional procedure, the latter on whether the accusations against the president rise to the level of state treason or another crime. Finally, a three-quarters vote in the Rada is necessary to convict the president and remove them from office. Should this occur, the Chairperson of the Verkhovna Rada of Ukraine will serve as acting president until a new president can be elected.

== History ==
=== Revolution of Dignity ===
In February 2014, the Revolution of Dignity culminated with the flight of then-President of Ukraine Viktor Yanukovych to Russia. There were no articles of impeachment brought against Yanukovych, as the impeachment process laid out in the Ukrainian Constitution was not designed to deal with the president abandoning their post without warning. Instead, the Verkhovna Rada voted on February 22, 2014 to "remove Viktor Yanukovych from the post of president of Ukraine" on the grounds that he had withdrawn from fulfilling his constitutional duties, and to hold early presidential elections on May 25. The exact wording of the title of this resolution was "Resolution of the Verkhovna Rada of Ukraine: On self-removal of the President of Ukraine from the exercise of constitutional powers and appointment of extraordinary elections of the President of Ukraine."

Resolution of the Verkhovna Rada №764-VII of 23.02.2014 «On conferring powers of the President of Ukraine on the Chairman of the Verkhovna Rada according to article 112 of the Constitution of Ukraine»

Given that President of Ukraine Viktor Yanukovych withdrew from performing the constitutional powers The Verkhovna Rada of Ukraine hereby resolves:

1. To confer the powers of the President of Ukraine on Chairman of the Verkhovna Rada of Ukraine Turchynov Oleksandr Valentynovych according to article 112 of the Constitution of Ukraine.
2. The given Resolution shall enter into force upon its adoption.

Chairman of the Verkhovna Rada О.TURCHYNOV

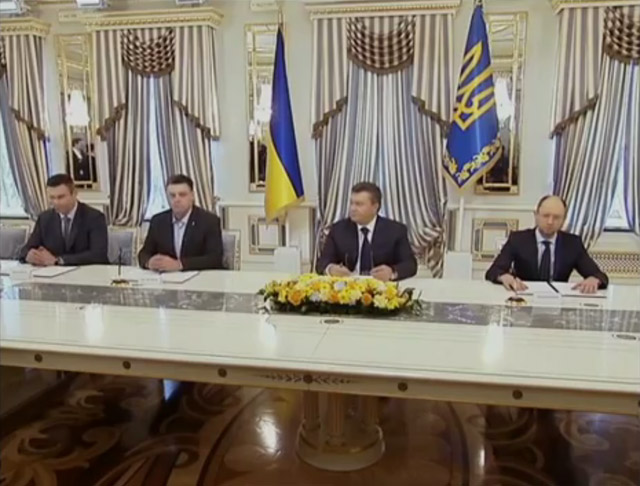
President Viktor Yanukovych signing agreement with opposition, 21 February 2014

Rada votes
Party	Yes	No	Abstention	Did not vote	Not present
Party of Regions	36	0	0	2	96
Batkivschyna	86	0	0	2	0
UDAR	41	0	0	0	1
Svoboda	36	0	0	0	0
Communist Party of Ukraine	30	0	0	1	1
Independent	99	0	0	1	17
Summary	328	0	0	6	116

The vote came an hour after Yanukovych said in a televised address that he would not resign. He subsequently declared himself to still be "the legitimate head of the Ukrainian state elected in a free vote by Ukrainian citizens". However, no country recognized this claim except Russia, which only recognized Yanukovych as head of Ukraine for a few more months: in May 2014, they joined most other countries in recognizing the newly elected Ukrainian government as the rightful leadership of the country.

== Parliament ==
Article 80 of the Ukrainian Constitution states that parliamentary immunity is guaranteed to the peoples' deputies of Ukraine. The peoples' deputies of Ukraine do not carry a legal responsibility for the results of voting and their saying in the parliament and its bodies, except the responsibility for an insult or defamation. The peoples' deputies of Ukraine cannot be held criminally liable, detained or arrested without the agreement of the Verkhovna Rada.
