= Svoboda (newspaper) =

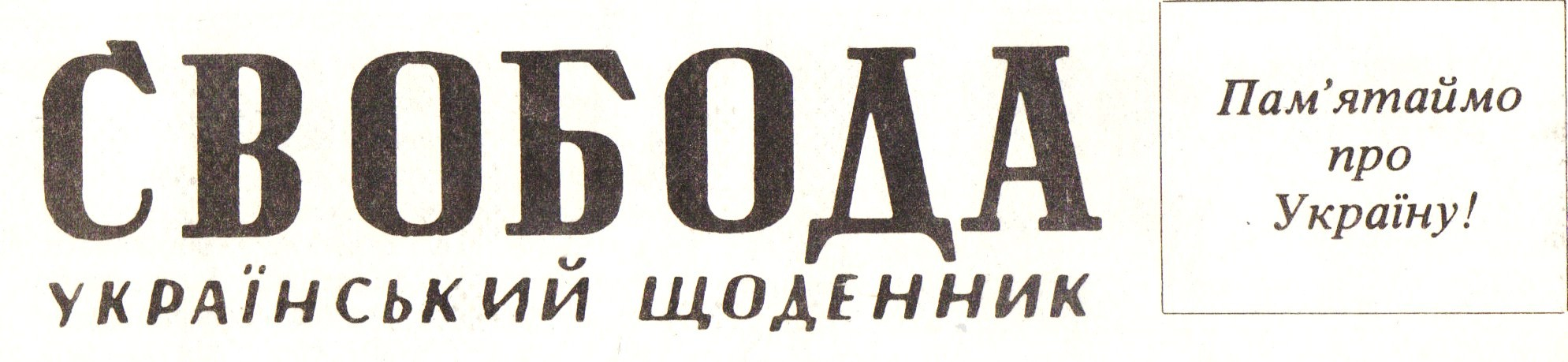
- Type: Weekly newspaper from July 3, 1998 (Daily prior to this)
- Owner(s): Ukrainian National Association, Inc.
- Founder: Hryhorii Hrushka
- Publisher: "Svoboda" Printing Office
- Editor-in-chief: Andrew Nynka
- Founded: 15 September 1893
- Language: Ukrainian, with some English
- Headquarters: Jersey City, New Jersey, United States
- Circulation: 7,524+; available online
- Sister newspapers: The Ukrainian Weekly
- ISSN: 0274-6964
- OCLC number: 1766932
- Website: svoboda-news.com

Svoboda (Ukrainian: «Свобода», lit. ''Liberty'') is the oldest existing Ukrainian newspaper and the most widely read in the Western world.

== History ==
Svoboda was founded in Jersey City, New Jersey, on September 11, 1893 by Father Hryhorii Hrushka. On February 22, 1894, the Ukrainian National Association (UNA) adopted the newspaper as its organ. It became a bi-weekly newspaper on March 1, 1894, a tri-weekly on August 8, 1914, and a daily on January 3, 1921. Svoboda served as a "mouthpiece" for Ukrainians in North America, and played an important role in the discussing and solving of immigrant difficulties. Prior to the establishment of Ukrainian-Canadian periodicals (such as the Kanadiiskyi Farmer), it was the only Ukrainian-language newspaper of any note in Canada but was banned by the country during World War II for its pro-Nazi sympathies.

Svoboda n° 129, 1916

Outside of North America, Ukrainians in Brazil, Galicia, and Bukovina also subscribed to it. It provided a channel of communication for those of the intelligentsia concerned with emigration of Ukrainian peasants and life in the New World; they used the paper to guide them into improved lifestyles and conformance to the ideals of European civilization. Through a program of enlightenment, Svoboda promoted the establishment of Ukrainian schools as well as the learning of Ukrainian language and history.

Its peak circulation was approximately 18,000.
