= Zenon Snylyk =

American soccer player

Personal information
- Date of birth: November 14, 1933
- Place of birth: Putyatyntsi, Rohatyn county, Stanislawow Voivodship, Poland
- Date of death: January 21, 2002 (aged 68)
- Place of death: Berkeley Heights, New Jersey, U.S.
- Height: 5 ft 7 in (1.70 m)
- Position: Midfielder

Youth career
- 1951–1954: University of Rochester

Senior career*
Years	Team	Apps	(Gls)
1950–1955	Rochester Ukrainians		
1956	Chicago Levy		
1955–1957	Montreal Ukrainians		
1957	Rochester Ukrainian		
1958–1961	Chicago Levy		
1959–1960	New York Ukrainians		
1962–1970	Newark Ukrainian Sitch		
1964	Montreal Ukrainians		

International career
1957–1961	United States	5	(0)
Medal record
Men's soccer
Representing the United States
Pan American Games
Bronze medal – third place	1959 Chicago	Team competition
- * Club domestic league appearances and goals

Zenon Snylyk (Ukrainian: Зенон Снилик, November 14, 1933 in Putyatyntsi, now Ukraine – January 21, 2002 in Berkeley Heights, New Jersey) was a former Ukrainian-American soccer player. He played for numerous ethnic Ukrainian amateur and professional clubs in both the U.S. and Canada over a twenty-year career. He also earned five caps with the U.S. national team between 1957 and 1963 and was a member 1956 U.S. Olympic soccer team.

== Youth ==
Although he was born in Putyatyntsi, Snylyk's family moved to the city of Lviv, where they lived until World War II. After the war, the Snylyk family fled to Mittenwald, West Germany, where they lived in a displaced persons camp from 1945 to 1949. While there, Snylyk attended a Ukrainian secondary school and played several sports, becoming noted for his skill at table tennis. In 1949 when he was fifteen, Snylyk's family moved to the United States. They settled in Rochester, New York where he attended Ben Franklin High School. After graduating from high school, he entered the University of Rochester.

== College ==
Snylyk attended the University of Rochester where he was a member of the school's soccer team from 1951 to 1954. He was an honorable mention (third team) All-American in both 1953 and 1954. Snylyk graduated with a bachelor's degree in political science in 1955 and was inducted into the University of Rochester Hall of Fame in 2005. In addition to graduating from Rochester in 1955, he also gained his U.S. citizenship that year.

He earned a master's degree from the University of Chicago in 1958. After graduating from Chicago, he taught political science at McGill University in Montreal, Canada in the 1959–1960 school year.

== Club career ==
Snylyk began his organized soccer career with a team his father founded in Rochester, the Ukrainian American Sports Association of Rochester (also known as the Rochester Ukrainians). He would play with the Ukrainians from 1950 to 1955, then again in 1957. In 1957, the Ukrainians lost, 1–0, to St. Louis Kutis in the National Amateur Cup final.

Over the years, he played for multiple teams, at time traveling by plane to make games in both Canada and the United States. In 1955, Snylyk joined the Montreal Ukrainians following the completion of Rochester's season. He then played in Montreal until 1957, when he joined Rochester for its run to the Amateur Cup final. Montreal finished league runner up in 1955 and champion in 1957.

At times Snylyk would play simultaneously for teams in the U.S. and Canada. While he could do this due to the off set seasons, at times he was forced to travel from one game to another by airplane. For example, while playing for Montreal Ukrainians, Snylyk also played with Chicago Levy in 1956, then from 1958 to 1961. At some point in there, he also played for Toronto Ukrainians and while teaching at McGill University of Montreal in 1959–1960, he would fly to New York to play games with the New York Ukrainians.

In 1962, Snylky moved to Newark, New Jersey to manage a newspaper. While there, he signed with Newark Ukrainian Sitch (also known as Chornomorska Sitch) of the American Soccer League (ASL). He remained with this, his last club, until his retirement in 1970. In 1963, Sitch won the ASL League Cup, known as the Lewis Cup. In the summer of 1964 he returned to play with Montreal Ukrainians in the National Soccer League.

== Olympic team ==
Beginning a year after he gained his U.S. citizenship, Snylyk began representing the U.S. at the international level. In 1956, he was selected to be the captain of the U.S. soccer team which competed at the 1956 Summer Olympics. The U.S. took a tour of Asia in preparation for the games. Despite good success at these friendly matches, the U.S. lost, 9–1, to Yugoslavia in the first round.

=== Pre-1956 Olympic Games tour ===
- Japan 3–5 U.S.
- Kansei 0–6 U.S.
- South Korea 1–0 U.S.
- Taiwan 1–6 U.S.
- Hong Kong 2–1 U.S.
- Philippines 0–4 U.S.
- Singapore 1–2 U.S.
- Indonesia 7–5 U.S.

In 1959, Snylyk was again selected as captain of the U.S. soccer team as it entered qualification for the 1960 Summer Olympics. This time a loss and a tie to Mexico in the first round of qualification put the U.S. out of contention for the tournament. In 1964, Snylyk was called into his third consecutive Olympic soccer team, but again the U.S. failed to qualify for the tournament with a 1–2 record in qualifications.

== Pan American Games ==
In the 1950s and 1960s, most players on the U.S. national team were amateurs. This allowed them to play both in full internationals and in the Olympics and Pan American Games which were fully amateur at the time. In 1959, Snylyk was selected for the U.S. soccer team at the 1959 Pan Am Games, held in Chicago. Just as with the Olympic squad, Snylyk was team captain of the U.S. as it captured the bronze medal in these games. On August 29, 1959, the U.S. defeated Brazil 5–3. However, this was also Snylyk's wedding day. He played the game, then drove, along with his teammates, to the church where he married Yara Matura, a native of Chicago. Following the reception, he went back to the competitors' compound to sleep.

Snylyk competed in the 1963 Pan Am Games. However, the U.S. was not as successful, finishing last and losing 10–0 to Brazil in the process.

== National team ==
Snylyk earned five caps with the U.S. national team from 1957 to 1961. In 1957, he played two World Cup qualification games. The first, a 6–0 loss to Mexico took place on April 7, 1956. On November 13, 1960, he was team captain as the U.S. lost 3–0 to Mexico in Mexico City in a World Cup qualifier. His last cap came as a substitute for Kenneth Finn in a 2–0 loss to Colombia on February 5, 1961.

== Newspaper editor ==
In 1962, the Ukrainian National Association hired Snylyk to edit The Ukrainian Weekly. He remained as editor until 1980. That year, he became the editor of the Ukrainian-language newspaper, Svoboda. He retired in June 1988.

Snylyk died on January 21, 2002, at his home in Berkeley Heights, New Jersey.

Gene Chyzowych, who played with Snylyk at Rochester, later wrote, "He was the most intelligent tactician I ever played with. . . . Zenon had no size or strength, but skills and speed of thought would compensate for duels and tackles other players would get into."
