= The Ukrainian Weekly =

English-language newspaper of the Ukrainian diaspora

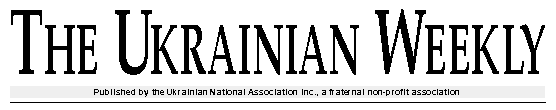
- Type: Weekly newspaper
- Owner(s): Ukrainian National Association, Inc.
- Publisher: "Svoboda" Printing Office
- Editor-in-chief: Andrew Nynka
- Founded: October 6, 1933
- Language: English
- Headquarters: Jersey City, New Jersey, United States
- Sister newspapers: Svoboda (newspaper)
- ISSN: 0273-9348
- OCLC number: 7042061
- Website: http://www.ukrweekly.com/

The Ukrainian Weekly is the oldest English-language newspaper of the Ukrainian diaspora in the United States, and North America.

Founded by the Ukrainian National Association, and published continuously since October 6, 1933, archived copies of the newspaper are available at leading libraries in the United States, as well as online at the newspaper's website.
