= Ukrainian National Association =

North America fraternal order

- Український народний союз
- Abbreviation: UNA
- Established: February 22, 1894; 132 years ago
- Founded at: Shamokin, Pennsylvania, United States
- Type: Mutual aid society
- Region served: United States
- Website: unainc.org
- Formerly called: Ruthenian National Union

The Ukrainian National Association (UNA) (Ukrainian: Український народний союз, romanized: Ukrainskyi narodnyi soiuz), known before 1914 as the Ruthenian National Union (Ukrainian: Руський Народний Союз, romanized: Ruskyi Narodnyi Soiuz), is a North American fraternal organization founded in Shamokin, Pennsylvania, on February 22, 1894, when the first wave of immigrants from the territories of today's Western Ukraine came to the United States and Canada.

== History ==
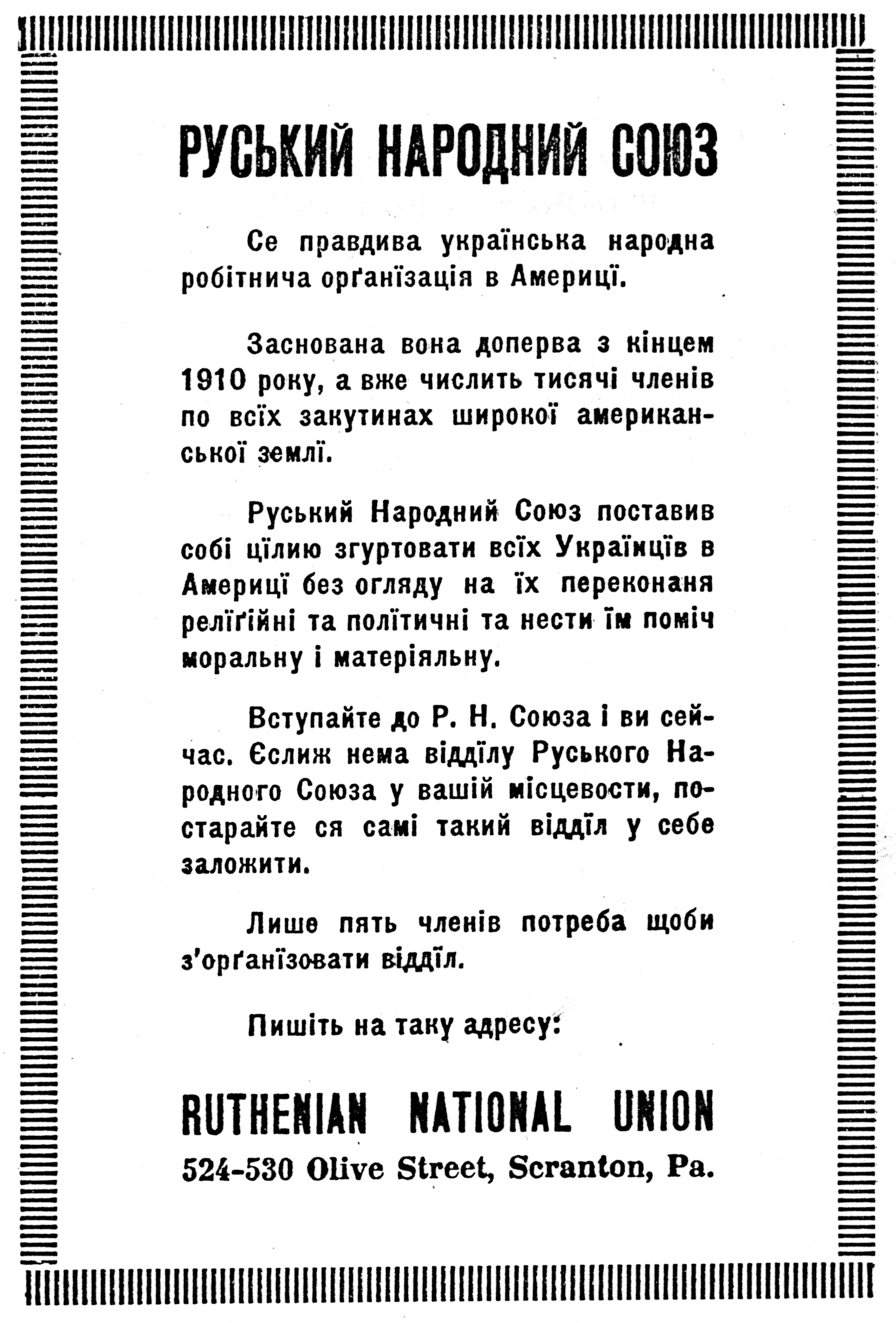
1916 Advertisement for membership of the Ruthenian National Union.

Originally called the Ruthenian National Union (Ukrainian: Руський Народний Союз, romanized: Ruskyi Narodnyi Soiuz), it was partly established to counter the influence of the Hungarian-oriented Greek Catholic Union of the USA. The Union adopted the newspaper Svoboda (Liberty) as its organ and sought to develop a distinctly Ukrainian identity. It offered to provide for material needs, such as funeral expenses and care for destitute members while also promoting Ukrainian culture.

The Union later changed its name to the Ukrainian National Association in order to assert a specifically Ukrainian ethnocultural identity.

During the Cold War, the UNA advocated on behalf of Ukraine's independence. It also sponsored the creation of a Ukrainian Studies Center at Harvard University, the erection of the Taras Shevchenko Monument in Washington, D.C., and the publication of Ukraine: a concise encyclopedia.

UNA retains a close relationship with the Ukrainian Orthodox Church of the USA.

== Membership ==
Membership is open to those of Ukrainian descent or married to the same. People under sixteen must join the junior division.

In 1965 the UNA had 84,414 members. By 1979 this had declined to 81,000. There were 69,000 members in 1995. It now has more than 50,000 members in the United States and Canada, who own over $170 million in life insurance protection in the UNA.

In 1979 the UNA had 465 local units in the US and Canada in twenty-nine districts in 1979. Its headquarters were in Jersey City, New Jersey.

== Activities ==
In 1952, the organization founded the Soyuzivka Heritage Center in the Catskills for use as a cultural center by its members. The association founded the weekly English language newspaper, The Ukrainian Weekly and the Ukrainian language daily Svoboda and the monthly Veselka. It also sponsors summer school, folk dances, cultural events and charitable giving.
