= Ukrainian Canadian Congress =

Ukrainian-Canadian organization

Ukrainian Canadian Congress (UCC)
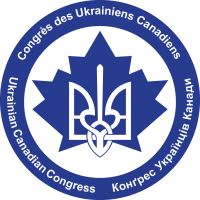
- Formation: November 6, 1940; 85 years ago
- Founded: 1940; 86 years ago as the Ukrainian Canadian Committee
- Legal status: Nonprofit organization
- Headquarters: Winnipeg, Manitoba, Canada
- Method: Political advocacy, lobbying, cultural activities
- President: Alexandra Chyczij
- CEO: Ihor Michalchyshyn
- Website: ucc.ca

The Ukrainian Canadian Congress (UCC; Ukrainian: Конгрес Українців Канади; French: Congrès des Ukrainiens Canadiens) is a nonprofit umbrella organization of Ukrainian-Canadian political, cultural, and religious organizations founded in 1940.

== History ==
=== Pre-UCC ===
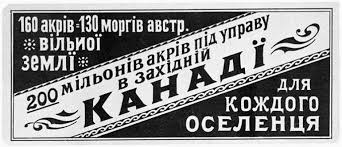
Advertisement for Ukrainians stating that there is free land available over 200 million acres.

Ukrainians immigrated to Canada at the turn of the 20th century, settling mostly in rural areas of the prairie provinces. Given the church services were required all the more by the new settlers, and in 1918 the autonomous Ukrainian Greek-Orthodox Church of Canada was established. Between 1903 and 1920 Ukrainian Canadians started many organizations and institutions (Ridna Shkola, Taras Shevchenko Institute in Edmonton, Andrey Sheptycky Ukrainian Bursa in Winnipeg among others).

With the outbreak of WWI many Ukrainian immigrants were detained being deemed "enemy aliens" as they arrived from countries at war with Canada. Formed in 1917, the Ukrainian Canadian Citizens' Committee, consisting of various lay and church organizations sent a delegation to Ottawa to protest the classification of immigrants from western Ukraine as "enemy aliens".

A number of organizations became active in the '20s and '30s including USRL, UNF, the Ukrainian Catholic Brotherhood and others.

The need for unified action by the Ukrainian community became urgent in 1938 to react to events affecting Ukrainians in Europe and the beginning of WWII. The community was anxious to unite under one representative committee.

=== UCC ===
The final and conclusive impetus for unity came in 1940 from the National War Services of Canada which was anxious that young Ukrainians enlist in military services.

Originally known as the Ukrainian Canadian Committee (by which it was known until 1989), it was established as a result of the efforts of the Ukrainian Canadian community in November 1940. The main reason that UCC was formed was to have an umbrella organization which could speak for all Ukrainian Canadians and co-ordinate their common goals. The first congress of Ukrainian Canadians occurred June 22–24, 1943. This was attended by over 600 Ukrainian Canadians. The slogan of this congress was "Victory and Freedom".

In 1952 to combat Soviet propaganda, radio services such as the Voice of America and Radio Canada International Ukrainian-language service, broke through the information blockade and broadcast into the Soviet Union. This was achieved in no small part due to the hard work of the UCC and the Ukrainian Congressional Committee of America.

By 1959, during the sixth Congress of Ukrainian Canadians 25 organizations comprised the membership of the UCC. Resolutions were approved dealing with financial, organizational, social, educational, cultural and political issues as well as student and women's activities, all aimed at strengthening the community and the UCC.

In 2007, the Toronto branch of the Ukrainian Canadian Congress awarded 173 former members of Carpathian Sich, Ukrainian Insurgent Army (UPA), Ukrainian National Army, Canadian Armed Forces and the British Army the Medal of Merit for their sacrifice.

In August 2022, Russia designated the Ukrainian Canadian Congress as an "undesirable organization".

Since fall 2022, after the passing of Resolution of the XXVII Triennial Congress of Ukrainian Canadians, the Ukrainian Canadian Congress has been awarding the Ukrainian Canadian Sacrifice Medal to Canadian citizens who have been killed or wounded while serving in the Armed Forces of Ukraine.

== Leadership ==
The UCC National President is Alexandra Chyczij. The previous UCC National President was Paul M. Grod (2007–2018), who later became the President of the Ukrainian World Congress.

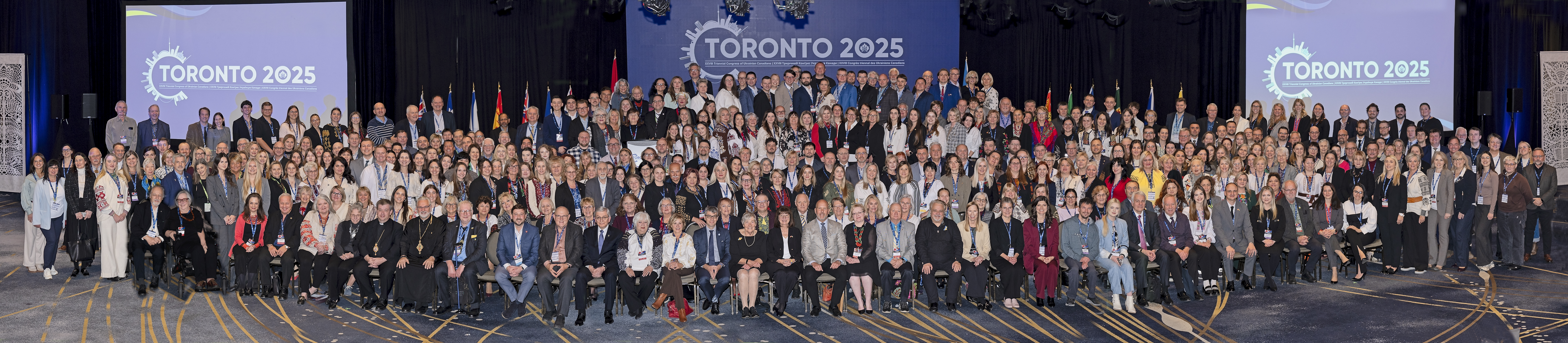
Group photo of the participants of the 28th Triennial Ukrainian Canadian Congress, 2025

List of presidents of the UCC
No.	Name	Term of office		Duration
1	Wasyl Kushnir	1940	1953	13 years (Note: For a total of 25 years.)
2	Antony Yaremovich	1953	1957	4 years
3	Serge Sawchuk	1957	1959	2 years
–	Wasyl Kushnir	1959	1971	12 years
4	Dr. Peter Kondra	1971	1974	3 years
5	Serge Radchuk	1974	1980	6 years
6	John Nowosad	1980	1986	6 years
7	Dmytro Cipywnyk	1986	1991	5 years
8	Oleh Romaniw	1991	1998	7 years
9	Eugene Czolij	1998	2004	6 years
10	Orysia Sushko	2004	2007	3 years
11	Paul M. Grod	2007	2018	11 years
12	Alexandra Chyczij	2018	Present	6 years

== Shevchenko Medal ==
The UCC has issued the Shevchenko Medal to the following recipients within the last 12 years:

2013 Triennial Conference (Toronto)

- Juriy Darewych
- Edward Klopoushak
- Iryna Mycak
- Roman Borys
- Peter Shostak
- Juliette Augustine Sysak Cavazzi
- Daria Darewych
- Valentina Kuryliw
- Iroida Wynnycka

2016 Triennial Conference (Regina)

- Daria Vera Luciw
- Halya Lypska Wilson
- Paul Migus
- Yuri Shymko
- Olya Odynsky-Grod
- Myroslava Pidhirnyj
- Tanya Dzulynsky
- Iryna Jendrijewska
- Mary Pidkowich
- Nestor Olynyk
- Orysia Tracz
- Ken Krawetz

2019 Triennial Conference (Ottawa)

- Roman Waschuk
- Irena Bell
- Bohdan Kordan
- Paul M. Grod
- Markian Shwec
- Ron Cahute
- Zorianna Hrycenko-Luhova
- Oksana Rewa
- Oleh Romanyschyn
- Orest Steciw
- Borys Sydoruk
- Mary Ann Trischuk
- Lt. Gen. Paul Wynnyck

2022 Triennial Conference (Winnipeg)

- Ukrainian National Federation of Canada
- Ukrainian Shumka Dancers
- Irene Shust-Dankowycz
- Leslie B. Salnick
- Taras Pidzamecky
- Pavlo Lopata
- Andrew Hladyshevsky
- Victor Hetmanczuk
- Jaroslaw Balan
- Wayne Babych
- Dave Babych
- Hon. Lloyd Axworthy

2025 Triennial Conference (Toronto)

Shevchenko Medal recipients, 2025

- Brian Cherwick
- Peter Kondra
- Oleh Lesiuk
- Olesia Luciw-Andryjowycz
- Roman Petryshyn
- Oksana Prociuk-Ciz
- Oleh Romanyschyn

== Members ==
=== Provincial Councils and Branches ===
There are six Provincial Councils under the UCC National umbrella, which bring together hundreds of provincial Ukrainian Canadian community groups.

Branches of the Ukrainian Canadian community work at the local/civic level. They are all under the umbrella of UCC National however they are separate legal entities.

- Alberta Provincial Council
  - Calgary
  - Edmonton
- British Columbia Provincial Council
  - Vancouver
  - Victoria
- Manitoba Provincial Council
- Ontario Provincial Council
  - Bradford
  - Durham Region
  - Hamilton
  - London
  - Niagara
  - Ottawa
  - Toronto
  - Waterloo - Wellington
  - Windsor
- Quebec Provincial Council
  - Montreal
- Saskatchewan Provincial Council
  - Canora
  - Regina
  - Saskatoon
  - Yorkton
- Other Local Branches
  - Halifax
  - Prince Edward Island

=== Member organizations ===
In addition to its provincial councils and local branches, the Ukrainian Canadian Congress consists of numerous national members:

- Canada-Ukraine Chamber of Commerce
- Canada-Ukraine Foundation
- Canadian Ukrainian Immigrant Aid Society
- Council of Ukrainian Credit Unions of Canada
- League of Ukrainian Canadians
  - League of Ukrainian Canadian Women
  - Ukrainian Youth Association in Canada
- Plast Ukrainian Youth Association in Canada
- Shevchenko Scientific Society of Canada
- UFSC Heritage Life Insurance
- Ukrainian Canadian Bar Association
- Ukrainian Canadian Foundation of Taras Shevchenko
- Ukrainian Canadian Professional and Business Federation
- Ukrainian Canadian Research and Documentation Centre
- Ukrainian Canadian Social Services of Canada Headquarters
- Ukrainian Canadian Students' Union
- Ukrainian Canadian Veterans' Association
- Ukrainian Catholic Brotherhood of Canada
  - Ukrainian Catholic Women's League of Canada
  - Ukrainian Catholic Youth and Young Adults
- Ukrainian National Association
- Ukrainian National Federation of Canada
  - Ukrainian National Youth Federation of Canada
  - Ukrainian War Veterans Association of Canada
  - Ukrainian Women's Organization of Canada
- Ukrainian Self-Reliance League of Canada
  - Canadian-Ukrainian Youth Association
  - Ukrainian Museum of Canada
  - Ukrainian Self-Reliance Association
  - Ukrainian Orthodox Youth of Canada
  - Ukrainian Women's Association of Canada
- Ukrainian Self-Reliance League of Canada
