= Valentina Kuryliw =

Canadian historian (born 1945)

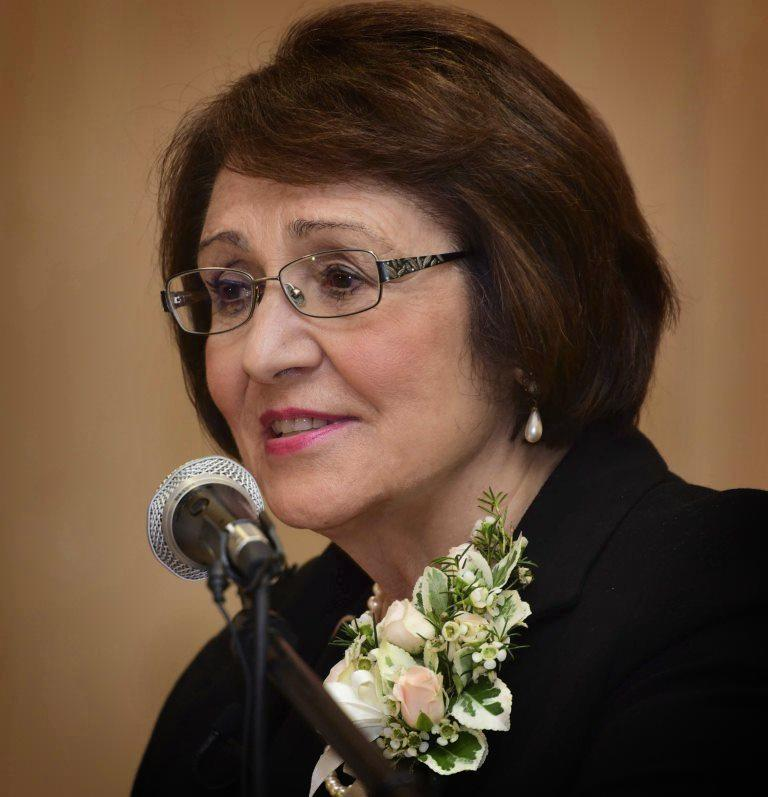
Valentina Kuryliw speaking at her book launch in Toronto, 2018.

Valentina Kuryliw (July 22, 1945, Mannheim in Baden-Württemberg, Germany) is a historian and educator specializing in the Ukrainian Holodomor genocide of 1932–1933. Now retired, she served as the Department Head of History and Social Sciences for the Toronto District School Board with over 35 years of teaching experience. She is a methodologist, worked with the Ontario Institute for Studies in Education (OISE) at the University of Toronto training young history, law and sociology teachers and evaluating their achievements. She has also travelled extensively throughout Ukraine teaching teachers about human rights, critical thinking skills and the Holodomor in many of its regions since 1993; "Every year (since 1993) Valentina Kuryliw comes to Ukraine – a Canadian of Ukrainian descent, a methodological teacher, a history specialist from Toronto. She conducted courses in the summer in Lviv, Odesa, Vasyl`kiv, Kyiv, Chernivtsi, Ternopil, Lutsk, Khmelnytsky, Donetsk, Kharkiv and thus shows Ukrainian history teachers that teaching can be different. Ms. Valentina has made an invaluable contribution to the development of Ukrainian methodological thought." She taught the history of Ukraine at the Tsiopa Palijiw Ukrainian School Toronto where she was assistant director. From 2009, she is the chair of the National Holodomor Education Committee. of the Ukrainian Canadian Congress; from 2013, the Director of Education of the Holodomor Research and Education Consortium at the Canadian Institute of Ukrainian Studies, University of Alberta (Toronto office); from 2009, she is a member of the Board of the Ukrainian Canadian Research and Documentation Centre (Toronto). She is a permanent member of the Ontario History and Social Studies Teacher's Association (OHASSTA).

== Biography ==
Kuryliw is the child of two Holodomor survivors. Kuryliw was born in a displaced persons camp in Mannheim, Germany; in 1950 she and her family left for Canada and landed at Pier 21 in Halifax where her family has a bronze brick. She studied history at McGill University in Montreal. In the summers of 1993-2008 she worked as a methodologist at advanced training centres presenting an additional qualifications course for history teachers in Lviv, Odesa, Lutsk, Ternopil, Khmelnytsky, Chernivtsi, Donetsk, Kharkiv, Kyiv, Vasylkiv (Kyiv region); conducted seminars on the Holodomor of 1932-33 for history teachers at institutes in Poltava and Sumy, and at pedagogical universities in Kyiv and Kharkiv; In 2003 and 2005 she taught a methodology course on teaching history at the National Pedagogical Drahomanov University (Kyiv), and in 2006 at the H.S. Skvoroda Kharkiv National Pedagogical University. Since 2007 she has been holding master classes for history and social studies teachers in Toronto, Edmonton, Winnipeg and across Canada; she has championed the inclusion of the Holodomor in Ukraine as a topic in the Canadian education curriculum, specifically in Ontario and facilitated its inclusion in other provinces across Canada. As a result of her early advocacy as a retired educator and later as the Director of Education of HREC, the "Holodomor may now be taught in at least 12 of 27 courses in the Ontario curriculum thanks to Kuryliw's efforts over the past 3 decades." She has also championed the establishment of "Holodomor Memorial Day" in schools across Canada on the 4th Friday in November as an annual day of commemoration and its inclusion in school calendars.

In addition to education, she is a human rights activist and takes an active part in other spheres of Ukrainian community life in Canada.

== Writing ==
Kuryliw's second book, Holodomor in Ukraine, The Genocidal Famine 1932-1933: learning materials for teachers and students published by CIUS Press (2018), is a comprehensive teaching resource. It has been vetted for use by teachers in schools in Canada and placed on the teaching resources lists of the following provinces to date: in Ontario, in the largest school board in Canada, the Toronto District School Board, Manitoba Education and Early Childhood Learning Diversity Education, Saskatchewan Teachers Federation. It is also sought after and used in curriculum units in the United States of America and other countries. It is described by teachers using it as "an amazing resource...a tremendous resource for students and teachers alike." The book features basic history, a timeline, illustrations, primary and secondary resources, lesson plans and curriculum applications for schools. It is being translated into Ukrainian and French.

=== Featured Writing ===
Kuryliw's first book, Metodyka vykladannia istorii / Methodology on Teaching History (Методика викладання історії) in Ukrainian (2003 and 2008), was written for teachers of history and social sciences in Ukraine to help reform the methods for teaching history using interactive teaching methods and developing critical and historical thinking skills.

Kuryliw has also authored an article, “Teaching the Ukrainian Genocide – the Holodomor, 1932-1933: A case of denial, cover-up and dismissal” in Samuel Totten`s (editor) Teaching about Genocide: Insights and Advice from Secondary Teachers and Professors, Volume 1. Lanham, MD: Rowman & Littlefield Publishers, 2018.

Kuryliw is also author of the “Historian's Craft” lesson, the inaugural lesson (2016) on the Holodomor Mobile Classroom touring Canada, emphasizing interactive learning methods and the use of primary resources. The lesson has received three international design awards for its immersive learning experience. In 2021, this Historian`s Craft Lesson was translated in Ukrainian by HREC, HREC PRESS in Ukraine. In 2014, the Historian`s Craft Lesson was published by CIUS PRESS.

== Awards ==
- Markian Ochrymowych Humanitarian Award (2019).
- St. Volodymyr the Great Medal (2018).
- Shevchenko Medal Award Education (2013), Ukrainian Canadian Congress, Ukrainian World Congress .
- Queen Elizabeth II Diamond Jubilee Award (2013).
- Excellence in Education award (Відмінник освіти України) from the Ministry of Education in Ukraine (2004).

== Bibliography ==
- “Teaching the Ukrainian Genocide – the Holodomor, 1932-1933: A case of denial, cover-up and dismissal” in Samuel Totten (editor) Teaching about Genocide: Insights and Advice from Secondary Teachers and Professors, Volume 1. Lanham, MD: Rowman & Littlefield Publishers, 2018.
- Holodomor in Ukraine, The Genocidal Famine 1932-1933: learning materials for teachers and students, Toronto: CIUS Press, 2018.
- Zakydalsky O. Canadian educators change the teaching of history in Ukraine. The Ukrainian Weekly. New Jersey, 2004. - 16 April.
- Metodyka vykladannia istorii / Methodology on Teaching History (Методика викладання історії) in Ukrainian (2003 and 2008)
- Subtelny Orest, "Valentina Kuryliw: Methods of teaching history." Pedagogical Thought. Lviv, Ukraine: 2003. - No. 3
- Fedorak V. "How to teach history in a modern school." History in schools of Ukraine. Chernivtsi, Ukraine: 2003. - No. 6;
