= Dmytro Cipywnyk =

Canadian physician and academic (1927–2003)

Dmytro Cipywnyk CM
- Official portrait, 1993

8th President of the Ukrainian World Congress
- In office 1993–1998
- Preceded by: Yuri Shymko
- Succeeded by: Askold Lozynskyj

7th President of the Ukrainian Canadian Congress
- In office 1986–1991
- Preceded by: John Nowosad
- Succeeded by: Oleh Romaniw

Personal details
- Born: April 15, 1927 Brooksby, Saskatchewan, Canada
- Died: March 9, 2003 (aged 75) Saskatoon, Saskatchewan, Canada
- Resting place: Woodlawn Cemetery
- Education: University of Saskatchewan (MD); McGill University (MSc); Albert Einstein College of Medicine
- Occupation: Physician and academic

Dmytro Cipywnyk CM (Ukrainian: Дмитро Ціпивник, romanized: Dmytro Tsipyvnyk; April 15, 1927 – March 9, 2003) was a Canadian physician and academic of Ukrainian descent who was elected as the president of the Ukrainian World Congress (UWC) from 1993 to 1998, and Ukrainian Canadian Congress (UCC) from 1986 to 1991.

== Education ==
After earning his Doctor of Medicine (MD) from the University of Saskatchewan and his Master of Science (MSc) from McGill University, he joined the Albert Einstein College of Medicine as a psychiatry fellow in 1963. In addition to serving as the medical head of the Saskatchewan Alcohol and Drug Abuse Commission from 1983 to 1992, he was a professor of psychiatry at the University of Saskatchewan from 1971 to 1992. He also worked as a private mental health practitioner.

== Career ==
During Cipywnyk's tenure as President of the UWC from 1993 to 1998, he also held significant leadership roles within the Canadian community, serving as President of the Canadian Ethnocultural Council and as President of the UCC from 1986 to 1991. Additionally, he assumed the position of chairman of the Provincial Council of the UCC, and he chaired the Advisory Committee under the Saskatchewan Government for Relations between Saskatchewan (Canada) and Ukraine. Notably, he played a pivotal role in fostering diplomatic ties between Ukraine and Canada, being part of the official Canadian delegation that visited Ukraine to establish crucial contacts.

Through Cipywnyk's efforts, Canada became the first Western country to recognize Ukraine's independence. Furthermore, he actively contributed to the commemoration of significant milestones in Ukrainian-Canadian history, including the All-Canadian celebrations of the 1000th anniversary of the Baptism of Rus-Ukraine and the 100th anniversary of the settlement of Ukrainians in Canada.

Cipywnyk would go on to co-chair the Prairie Center for Ukrainian Heritage, he served as chair of the Advisory Committee on Saskatchewan-Ukraine ties. He also worked on the University of Saskatchewan Senate and the Canadian Council of Christians and Jews.

== Death ==
UCC notified the Canadian Ukrainian community of the death of Cipywnyk, in Saskatoon on Sunday, March 9, 2003.

== Personal life ==
Cipywnyk belonged to the Ukrainian Orthodox Church of Canada. He was married, first to Sonia (née Stratychuk) Cipywnyk-Morris and then to Maura Gillis-Cipywnyk, with whom he was still with at the time of his death. He had two children and, as of 2003, two grandchildren.

== Awards and recognitions ==
In August 2017, him alongside other former non-living presidents were honored at the 50th anniversary of the UWC. Cipywnyk has earned the following honors:

- Member of the Order of Canada (CM; 1992)
- Honorary Award of the President of Ukraine (2002)
- Shevchenko Medal of the UCC (1995)
- Honorary doctorate in Canon Law from St. Andrew's College (1995)

Political offices
Preceded by John Nowosad	President of the Ukrainian Canadian Congress; 1986–1991	Succeeded by Oleh Romaniw
Preceded by Yuri Shymko	President of the Ukrainian World Congress; 1993–1998	Succeeded by Askold Lozynskyj
