= Maple Hope Foundation =

Canadian non-governmental organization

- Founded: 2014
- Founder: Members of the Ukrainian community in Vancouver
- Founded at: Ukraine and Ukrainian communities worldwide
- Type: Non-profit, Non-governmental organization
- Legal status: Registered non-profit organization
- Purpose: Humanitarian aid, medical assistance, psychological support, education, cultural diplomacy, advocacy
- Headquarters: Vancouver, British Columbia, Canada
- Revenue: Over CA$40 million (as of November 2025)
- Website: www.maplehopefoundation.org

Maple Hope Foundation is a Canadian non-governmental organization, registered in October 2015 in the province of British Columbia. The Foundation's activities focus on providing humanitarian, medical, psychological, and advocacy support to Ukraine and to Ukrainians affected by the Russo-Ukrainian War.

Founded by members of the Ukrainian-Canadian community in Vancouver, Maple Hope Foundation has become part of the global volunteer movement in support of Ukraine.

== History ==
The organization traces its origins to November 2013, when, during the Revolution of Dignity, members of the Ukrainian community in Vancouver united to organize rallies in support of Ukraine and to collect humanitarian aid. Civic activists, professionals from various fields as well as Ukrainian students in Canada, joined the initiative.

Maple Hope Foundation officially obtained its non-profit status in October 2015 and registered sister organization in Ukraine in 2026.

Maple Hope Foundation is a member organization of the Ukrainian Canadian Congress Vancouver and a recipient of the Ukrainian Canadian Congress National leadership award in 2025 in recognition of its achievements to support Ukraine and Ukrainians in Canada during the Russo-Ukrainian War.

== Activities ==
=== Medical Aid to Ukraine ===
At the onset of Russia's full-scale invasion in February 2022, the Maple Hope Foundation launched a dedicated medical support initiative to assist Ukrainian healthcare and frontline medical units. Through this program, the Foundation has provided medical equipment, supplies, and life-saving technologies to hospitals and military medical teams across the country. The initiative includes established cooperation with the Government of Canada to support the delivery of MOVES® SLC™ portable emergency care units for medical evacuations, developed by Canada’s Thornhill Medical.

Each battery-powered unit folds an oxygen concentrator, a ventilator, suction, and vital sign monitoring into one device small enough to carry but strong enough to keep the wounded alive when seconds count.

As part of the deployment of the medical technology donation to Ukraine, Maple Hope organized combat care training to military medical teams who received the technology.

By 2026, Maple Hope delivered 185 MOVES® SLC™ units to Ukraine and organized more than 15 training sessions for over 400 anesthesiologists. The two most recent deployments, totaling 80 units, were carried out in partnership with the Ukrainian World Congress.

=== Delivery of the Sikorsky S-76A Helicopter ===
In 2025, Maple Hope Foundation, in partnership with the Unite with Ukraine initiative of the Ukrainian World Congress, organized the delivery of a Sikorsky S-76A helicopter for medical evacuation needs of the Ministry of Defence of Ukraine.

The helicopter was donated by Helijet International. More than $100,000 CAD was raised in under three weeks through the crowdfunding campaign “RescueWings for Ukraine”, launched by Maple Hope.

Delivered to Ukraine in April 2025, the aircraft now serves in emergency evacuations. The project became an example of successful collaboration between Canadian business, members of the Ukrainian diaspora, and the non-profit sector.

=== Assistance to Civilian Hospitals ===
Since 2022, Maple Hope Foundation has provided CAD $11 million worth of assistance to civilian hospitals and clinics across Ukraine. This aid includes varied medical equipment for both routine and emergency procedures.

In September 2025, the Foundation delivered CAD 700,000 worth of medical equipment to hospitals in Netishyn, Pustomyty, Boryslav, Lviv, and Sumy, ensuring that frontline doctors and nurses had the necessary tools to save lives. Additionally, 330 Baylis V4C-560 ventilators were supplied to the Ministry of Health of Ukraine, strengthening the healthcare system's capacity to treat critically ill patients under wartime conditions.

In 2024, Maple Hope Foundation donated modern ENT medical equipment (a lor-combine) to the Kremenets Central Hospital in Ternopil region. The equipment, valued at approximately 700,000 UAH, was funded by Canadian philanthropist Marilyn Staiman, the daughter of Kremenets-born Thelma Deser.

=== Psychological Support Programs ===
Healing the Wounds of War Together (2023–present) is a Canada-wide pilot program focused exclusively on the provision of mental health supports to displaced Ukrainian women, youth, and teens rebuilding their lives in Canada. The initiative includes individual counseling sessions, peer-support groups, educational webinars, and regional forums, as well as seminars on adaptation, integration, and immigration issues.

Funded by the Canada-Ukraine Foundation and with support of the Ukrainian Canadian Congress (UCC) the program has helped over 3,000 Ukrainians across nine provinces access free trauma-informed mental-health and adaptation support services in their native language. More than 800 individual career counseling sessions have been conducted to support professional reintegration. A second phase of the program began in 2025.

Heal a Mother’s Heart (2023-present) is the international fundraising campaign “Heal a Mother’s Heart” aims to raise CAD $1.2 million to provide psychological assistance to women who have lost family members in the war, as well as to those whose loved ones are missing or in captivity.

As part of the initiative, the Foundation implements the “Source of Strength” psychological and recreational program for mothers and wives of fallen Ukrainian defenders. The program offers group therapy, art therapy, body-oriented and recreational practices, and creates a safe environment for grief processing and emotional recovery. As of February 2026 оver 900 bereaved women have taken part in psychological and recreational programs in the Carpathians.

Another component of the campaign focuses on educational programs in grief support for Ukrainian psychologists, educators, medical professionals, social workers, chaplains, and veterans’ support workers. More than 30000 professionals have completed certified training in professional grief support in cooperation with International Institute for Postgraduate Education.

“I Returned” Project (2016–2018) in consultation with Dr. Marvin Westwood, Maple Hope Foundation launched “I’ve Returned” Project, which aimed to bring Canadian expertise in PTSD treatment of veterans. Two training programs were delivered by Dr. Daria Shevchuk and the Veteran Transition Network.

=== Cultural and Film Programming ===
Maple Hope Foundation undertakes cultural and film programming related to Ukraine through the organization, co-presentation, and promotion of public events, including film screenings, literary events, art exhibitions, concerts, and related cultural activities.

In February 2024, Maple Hope Foundation co-presented Witnessing Change: Ukrainian Cinema in a Time of Turmoil, a month-long Ukrainian film series at The Cinematheque in Vancouver, British Columbia.

Curated by Alina Senchenko, the series presented nearly a century of Ukrainian filmmaking, including works produced under Soviet censorship, films from the Ukrainian poetic cinema movement of the 1960s, and contemporary Ukrainian cinema. The programming was developed in partnership with The Cinematheque and supported by the Taras Shevchenko Foundation. Its stated aim was to promote Ukrainian culture and film history to a wider, non-Ukrainian audience.

The film series was subsequently presented in Montreal from September 17 to October 8, 2025, at the Cinémathèque québécoise, marking the program’s first presentation in eastern Canada.

In 2025, Maple Hope Foundation and The Cinematheque co-presented two additional public events in Vancouver dedicated to Ukrainian poetic cinema. Titled Ukrainian Poetic Cinema: Rebuilding National Identity, the program explored the poetic cinema movement and its role in preserving Ukrainian cultural identity through film.

Odesa Week in Vancouver: In May 2025, Maple Hope Foundation organized one of Canada's largest cultural and advocacy projects - “Odesa Week in Vancouver.” The initiative was held in partnership with the City of Vancouver and the City of Odesa and celebrated the long-standing sister-city relationship between the two, established in 1944 - one of the first such partnerships in North America.

The event included an international online conference on Odesa's history and cultural legacy, a virtual exhibition showcasing the city's architectural and artistic heritage and the impact of war, performances by the Vancouver Symphony Orchestra, film screenings, culinary events, and numerous thematic activities.

Funds raised during the event were directed to support a specialized music school in Odesa, provide psychological assistance to women who lost their children due to the war, and fund cultural and veteran assistance projects.

=== Humanitarian Initiatives ===
Ukrainian Displaced Assistance Program (2022): A comprehensive program providing access to housing, employment support, language courses, children's summer camps, legal and professional counseling, and academic guidance for displaced Ukrainians in Canada.

Humanitarian Aid (2022): over 200 tons of humanitarian aid delivered to Ukraine in cooperation with volunteer organizations across Europe.

Support for Wounded Defenders (2014–2016): rehabilitation and prosthetics program for Ukrainian Defenders, participants of the Anti-Terrorist Operation (ATO) and children of internally displaced persons. The Foundation's team at that time worked to connect severely wounded Ukrainian soldiers and their families with Canadian donors willing to provide assistance.

“Maidan Youth” (2014): an educational and recreational program for 14 teenagers whose parents were killed or injured during the Revolution of Dignity. Participants visited Canada for cultural and educational activities.
