= Between Hitler and Stalin =

2003 documentary film

- Film poster
- Directed by: Slavko Nowytski
- Written by: Kristi Wheeler
- Story by: Wsevolod W. Isajiw
- Produced by: Slavko Nowytski
- Narrated by: Jack Palance
- Distributed by: Ukrainian Canadian Research and Documentation Centre
- Release date: 2003 (Canada)
- Running time: 60 minutes
- Countries: Canada; Ukraine
- Languages: English; Ukrainian

Between Hitler and Stalin: Ukraine in World War II (Ukrainian: «Між Гітлером і Сталіном — Україна в II Світовій війні», romanized: Mizh Hitlerom i Stalinym - Ukraina v Drugii svitovij viyni) is a 2003 film produced and directed by Slavko Nowytski and narrated by Jack Palance. The one-hour documentary, part black-and-white and part color, is a project of the Ukrainian Canadian Research and Documentation Centre — an attempt to tell the story of World War II from a Ukrainian perspective.

== Plot ==
In a chronological manner, Nowytski's film unfolds during the years of Soviet–Nazi collaboration recounting the losses and Ukrainian people suffering; the documentary shifts to the destruction wrought by Joseph Stalin's scorched earth policy as the Soviet Union's Red Army retreated, and shows the ruins left behind by the German and then the Soviet offensives.

== Comments ==
Between Hitler and Stalin describes the activity of the underground resistance movements, and specifically the long and large-scale struggle of the Ukrainian Insurgent Army (UPA) on two fronts, against both totalitarian powers, for Ukraine's independence. As Oksana Zakydalsky writes for The Ukrainian Weekly: "although [World War II is] often called the Russo-German war or described as Russia at war, only parts of Russia were occupied, while all Ukrainian territories were invaded and laid waste by both the Nazi and Soviet war machines. … The film documents Ukraine's contribution to the war against totalitarianism and the price Ukraine paid for its independence."

== Research ==
For historical and political commentary, the film relies on Norman Davies, a historian from University of London; Robert Conquest, a Soviet scholar at Hoover Institute; John Armstrong, an insurgency expert, and Zbigniew Brzezinski, a former US National Security Adviser.
