= Orysia Sushko =

Canadian community activist

Orysia Sushko CM
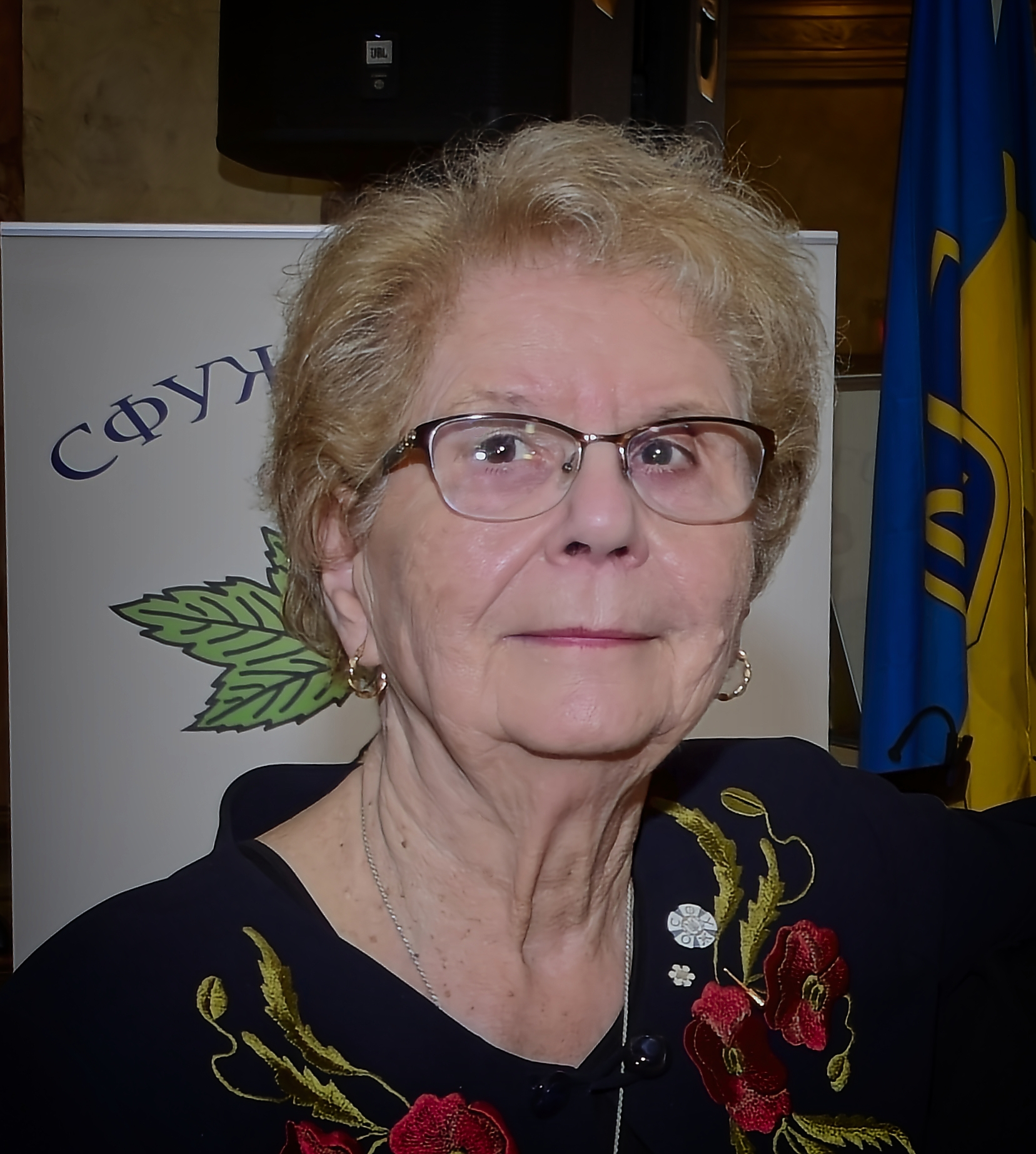
- Orysia Sushko in 2019

10th President of the Ukrainian Canadian Congress
- In office 2004–2007
- Preceded by: Eugene Czolij
- Succeeded by: Paul M. Grod

Personal details
- Citizenship: Canada
- Education: McMaster University (BA)
- Occupation: Community activist

Orysia "Irene" Sushko CM (Ukrainian: Орися Сушко) is a Canadian community activist of Ukrainian descent who was elected as the president of the Ukrainian Canadian Committee (UCC) from 2004 to 2007. She has dedicated her life to the advancement of human rights and diversity. She fought to protect Ukrainian culture and tradition in Canada. She served as the Holodomor Museum's founding chair in Hamilton.

== Early life and education ==
Orysia worked as the equity coordinator for the Hamilton, Ontario, Board of Education before earning her B.A. from McMaster University. In the Ukrainian community, she has served in a multitude of capacities, including editor-in-chief of PROMIN, chair of the Hamilton Status of Women Committee, president of Canadian Friends of RUKH – Hamilton, national president of the Ukrainian Women's Association of Canada, and several positions with the National Council of Women of Canada.

== Career ==
The World Federation of Ukrainian Women's Organizations (WFUWO) elected her as its president. Irene was the second vice president of the Ukrainian World Congress (UWC) when she presided over WFUWO. During her stint in office, WFUWO's role in the women's movement expanded, and Irene took part in the United Nations Commission on the Status of Women. Additionally, she has actively backed Ukraine's democratic transition, particularly the country's efforts to combat human trafficking and overhaul its election system. As a community activist, she has contributed to the enhancement of multicultural communication and the welfare of the Hamilton region.

Orysia holds the inaugural position at Hamilton's Holodomor Museum, an institution devoted to conserving the history of the famine that struck Ukraine in 1932–1933. In her capacity as a community activist, she has pushed for the advancement of intercultural dialogue and the welfare of the Hamilton region. In addition, she acts as a citizenship judge, officiating citizenship ceremonies and giving new Canadian citizens the oath of citizenship.

Under her leadership, Governor General Adrienne Clarkson awarded the UCC a Certificate of Commendation on 31 August 2005.

== Awards and recognitions ==
Irene was awarded the Order of Canada in recognition of her long-term community activity in favor of women's rights, diversity, and multiculturalism, as well as her assistance to the Ukrainian Canadian community. Governor General Michaëlle Jean has announced 74 new appointees, including her. She has earned the following honors:

- Member of the Order of Canada (CM; 2010)
- Women of Influence's Top 25 Women of Influence (2014)

Political offices
Preceded by Eugene Czolij	President of the Ukrainian Canadian Congress; 2004–2007	Succeeded by Paul M. Grod
