= SUSK =

Ukrainian Canadian Students' Union
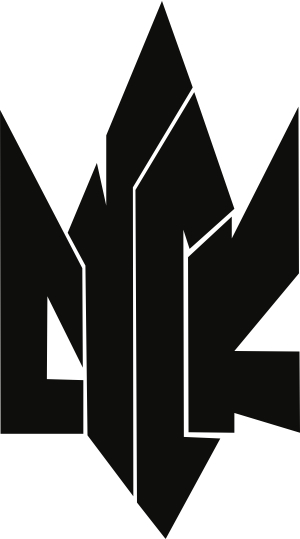
- Established: 1953
- President: Daria Furtak
- Affiliations: Ukrainian Canadian Congress
- Website: www.susk.ca

The Ukrainian Canadian Students’ Union (Note: (Ukrainian: Cоюз Українськoгo Студентства Канади (CУСК), French: Union des Étudiants Ukrainiens Canadiens)), commonly known by the anglicization of its Ukrainian acronym, SUSK, is a Ukrainian-Canadian student organization with member organizations at post-secondary institutions across Canada. SUSK is a national member of the Ukrainian Canadian Congress and provides Ukrainian-Canadian cultrual and political programming for its members.

SUSK was founded in 1953 in Winnipeg, Manitoba and fell inactive in 2002. The organization was revived in 2007 at the XXII Congress of Ukrainian Canadians in Winnipeg. As of March 2026, SUSK consists of 26 member organizations at colleges and universities in British Columbia, Alberta, Saskatchewan, Manitoba, Ontario, and Quebec.

Student is the official publication of SUSK, having been published since 1968.

== Notable alumni ==
- Arthur McDonald
- Michael Bociurkiw, Board of Directors President from 1982 to 1984
- Paul M. Grod, Board of Directors member from 1994 to 1997 (President from 1994 to 1995)
- Donald Sadoway, Board of Directors member from 1972 to 1974

== See also ==
- List of Canadian students' associations
- Ukrainian Canadian Congress
