= Askold Lozynskyj =

American lawyer (born 1952)

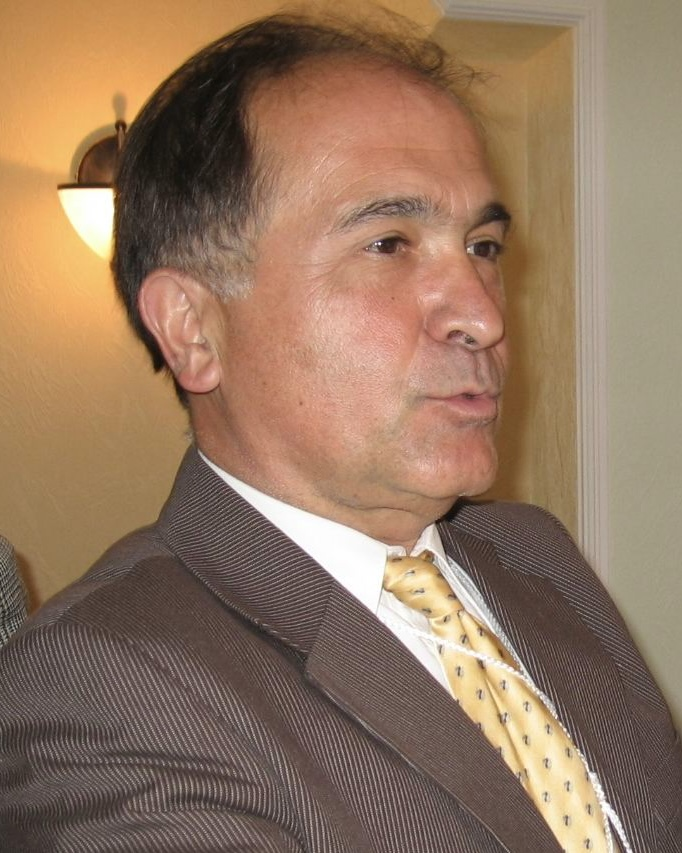
- Lozynskyj in 2013

9th President of the Ukrainian World Congress
- In office 1998–2008
- Preceded by: Dmytro Cipywnyk
- Succeeded by: Eugene Czolij

Personal details
- Born: Askold S. Lozynskyj; February 8, 1952 (age 74) New York City, New York, United States
- Spouse: Roksolana Kassandra Stojko (m. 1980)
- Children: 2
- Parent(s): Evhen Lozynskyj (father); Maria Nadia Safian (mother)
- Education: Fordham University School of Law
- Occupation: Lawyer and author

Askold Yevhenovych Lozynskyj (Note: Ukrainian: Аскольд Євгенович Лозинський, romanized: Askold Yevhenovych Lozynskyi) (born February 8, 1952) is an American author and attorney of Ukrainian descent who was the elected president of the Ukrainian World Congress (UWC) from 1998 to 2008, the Ukrainian Congress Committee of America (UCCA) from 1992 to 2000, and the Ukrainian Student Organization from 1973 to 1975.

== Early life and education ==
Askold S. Lozynskyj was born in New York City, on February 8, 1952, to Evhen Lozynskyj and Maria Nadia Safian, an actress. His father immigrated to the US in 1951, during the a wave of Ukrainian emigration, and settled in New York. He obtained his bachelor's degree (Latin and Greek) in 1973, and later his Juris Doctor in 1976, from the Fordham University School of Law. Police detained him several times for planning and conducting anti-Soviet protests in the US. He oversaw the editing of an English-language book collection on dissident Ukrainians.

== Career ==
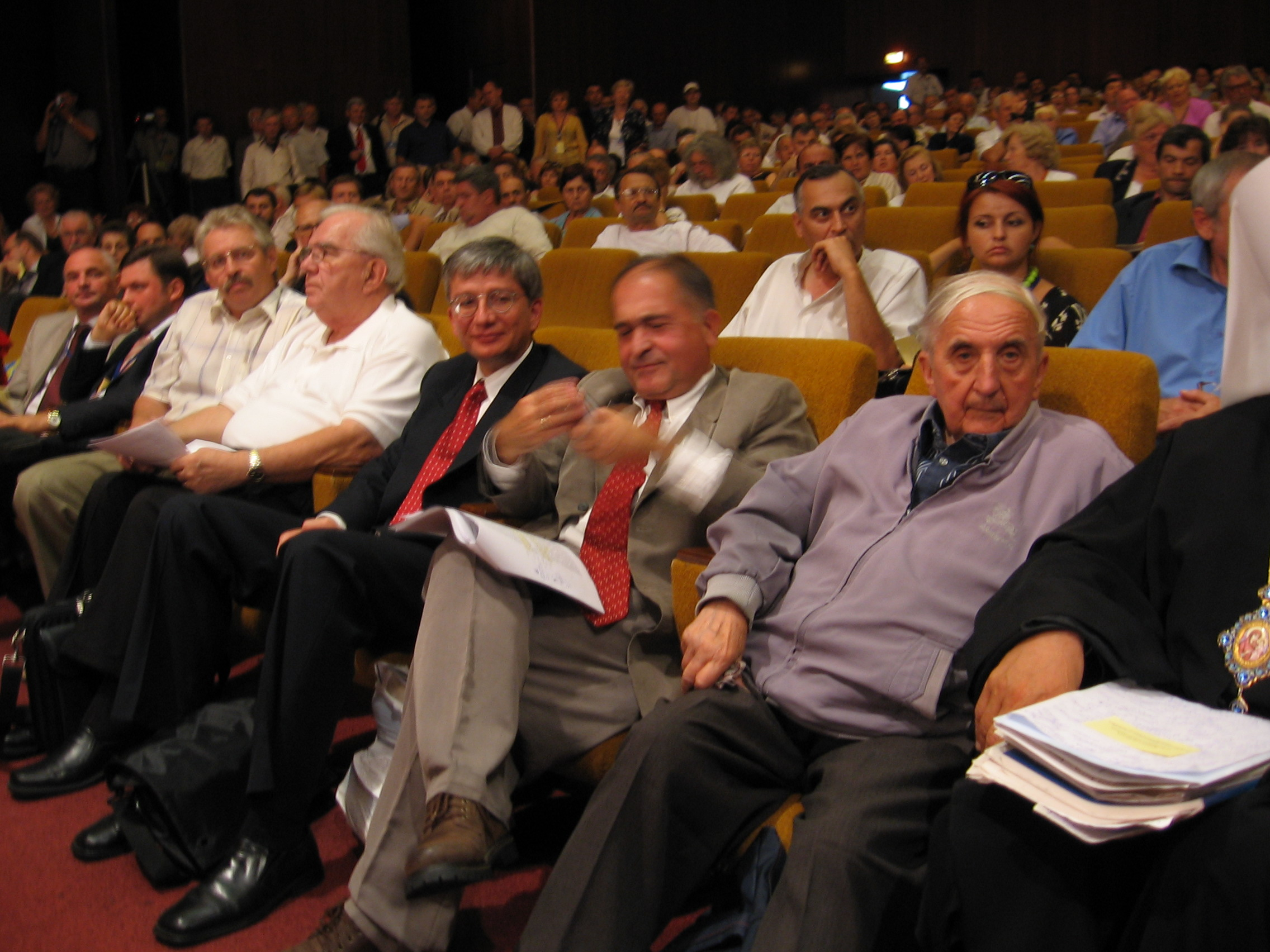
Eugene Czolij and Lozynskyj (gray suit) at a forum in 2006

From 1972 to 1975, Lozynskyj served as President of the Ukrainian Student Organization, followed by his role as President of the Ukrainian American Youth Association from 1980 to 1989. Transitioning to broader leadership roles, he took on the position of Executive Vice President of the UCCA from 1990 to 1992 and have been serving as its president from 1992 to 2006. Additionally, he has been involved in directing the Commercial Law Project for Ukraine since 1993.

In the realm of philanthropy and cultural advocacy, Lozynskyj served as Director of the Cooperative for American Relief Everywhere from 1980 to 1985 and have been involved with the American Friends of the Odesa Philharmonic since 1996. Professionally, he is a member of the American Bar Association, New York State Bar Association since 1977, and Ukrainian American Bar Association. Real estate, trade operations, and property law were his areas of expertise. He continues to be a Federal Bar member.

In 1999, Lozynskyj addressed the President of Ukraine in an open letter that summarized many of the grievances voiced by the diaspora on the cautious stance taken by the Ukrainian government on language matters.

== Works ==
Lozynskyj has been the writer of several articles in Ukrainian magazines on contemporary political issues. Examples of his works are:

- Ukraine: Issues that Matter. Kyiv-Mohyla Academy Publishing House. 2021. ISBN 9789665187936.
- Бо москалі – чужі люде... (in Ukrainian). Lviv. 2023. ISBN 978-617-8055-89-9.
- Ukraine: Slaying the Two-Headed Eagle (2023)
- Л., Рудницький; Карась, А.; Лозинський, А. (2023). Мрія, слово і чин: збірник на пошану Володимира Янева (відгуки, рецензії, спогади) (in Ukrainian). Lviv; Munich; New York. ISBN 978-617-7546-12-1.

== Personal life ==
Lozynskyj is married to Roksolana Kassandra Stojko on August 16, 1980, and together they have a son and daughter.

== Negationist and antisemitism ==
Lozynskyj wrote a letter on the occasion of the trial of John Ivan Demjanjuk, former Ukrainian guard at the Sobibor extermination camp. He said:

When the Soviets were forced to retreat in the face of the Nazi invasion in June 1941, they massacred their prisoners. […] This was accomplished with the help of local communists, mostly ethnically Jewish. This massacre was unfortunately not an aberration of Soviet works in Ukraine. By 1932-1933, in eastern Ukraine, the Soviets had already murdered approximately seven million Ukrainian men, women and children by means of a strategically planned genocide of artificial starvation. The man chosen by Joseph Stalin to perpetrate this crime was a Jew, Lazar Kaganovich. […] The Russians and Germans were barbarians. But the Jews were the worst. They betrayed their neighbors and did it with such zeal!"

== Awards and recognitions ==
Lozynskyj has earned the following awards and recognitions:

- Order of Merit Second Class (2006)
- Simon Petliura Medal (2021)
- Recipient of the Ukrainian Independence Day Community Service Awards (2023); for giving humanitarian relief to individuals impacted by the war in Ukraine.

== Notes ==
Political offices
Preceded by Dmytro Cipywnyk	President of the Ukrainian World Congress; 1998–2008	Succeeded by Eugene Czolij
