= Slavko Nowytski =

Ukrainian American filmmaker (1934–2019)

- Святослав Новицький
- Born: Sviatoslav Oleksandrovych Nowytski; October 19, 1934; Torchyn, Ukrainian SSR (now Ukraine)
- Died: November 28, 2019 (aged 85); Minneapolis, Minnesota
- Occupation: Filmmaker

Slavko Nowytski (October 19, 1934 – November 28, 2019, born Sviatoslav Oleksandrovych Novytskyi (Note: Ukrainian: Святослав Олександрович Новицький, romanized: Sviatoslav Oleksandrovych Novytskyi)) was an American filmmaker.

== Films ==
- Sheep in Wood (1971)
- Pysanka: The Ukrainian Easter Egg (1976)
- Immortal Image (1979)
- Harvest of Despair (1983)
- Between Hitler and Stalin (2003)
