= Wasyl Kushnir =

Ukrainian priest and political activist (1893–1979)

The Reverend Wasyl Kushnir OC

1st President of the World Congress of Free Ukrainians
- In office 1973–1978
- Preceded by: Antin Melnyk
- Succeeded by: Mykola Plaviuk
- In office 1967–1969
- Preceded by: Office established
- Succeeded by: Joseph Lesawyer

1st President of the Ukrainian Canadian Committee
- In office 1959–1971
- Preceded by: Serge Sawchuk
- Succeeded by: Peter Kondra
- In office 1940–1953
- Preceded by: Office established
- Succeeded by: Antony Yaremovich

Personal details
- Born: September 17, 1893 Wikno, Austrian Galicia, Austria-Hungary (now Vikno, Ternopil Oblast, Ukraine)
- Died: September 25, 1979 (aged 86) Winnipeg, Manitoba, Canada
- Resting place: All Saints Cemetery, Rural Municipality of West St. Paul
- Citizenship: Austria-Hungary; Canada
- Education: Collegium Canisianum; University of Innsbruck
- Occupation: Priest and political activist

Wasyl "Basil" Kushnir OC (Ukrainian: Василь Михайлович Кушнір, romanized: Vasyl Mykailovych Kushnir; September 17, 1893 – September 25, 1979) was a Ukrainian priest and political activist who was elected as the president of the World Congress of Free Ukrainians (WCFU) from 1967 to 1969 and 1973 to 1978, and Ukrainian Canadian Committee (UCC) from 1940 to 1953 and 1959 to 1971.

== Early life and education ==
Kushnir was born on September 17, 1893, in Vikno, West Ukraine, and finished his high school education in Ternopil and Lviv. He served in the Austro-Hungarian Army on the Italian front during World War I and spent three years in captivity. After passing via Odesa, he joined the Red Army and served in Vinnytsia and Kharkiv before fleeing to his hometown. He was a teacher in 1923–1924.

Kushnir studied theology at the Theological Seminary in Lviv and the University of Innsbruck, Austria, after the war. In 1929, he was awarded a doctorate of divinity from the latter institution. He was a professor at the Theological Seminary in Stanislaviv, from 1930 until 1934.

== Career ==
In May 1934, Kushnir immigrated to Canada and was ordained as a Ukrainian Catholic priest in Winnipeg. The customary Zeleni Svyata memorial service for fallen warriors, started in 1936 by Kushnir. Father Kushnir would go on to serve as UCC president for more than two decades.

Kushnir oversaw UCC efforts to assist Canada's government in the early post-World War II repatriation of over 40,000 anti-Soviet Ukrainian émigrés. He was particularly eager to support and encourage the official initiative to receive veterans of the Waffen SS Galicia. In December 1945, he left for a tour of the Ukrainian displacement camps under American and British occupation.

A strong opponent of communism, Kushnir led a team to the United Nations' first session in 1945 in San Francisco, California, where they contested the Ukrainian Soviet Socialist Republic's authority to represent Ukrainians. He presided over the UCC from 1940 to 1953 and again from 1957 to 1972. He was one of its founders. He signed the NATO declaration in 1954 as one of Canada's delegates.

Under his direction, the Sts. Vladimir and Olga Ukrainian Catholic Cathedral was constructed between 1947 and 1951. He became the UCC's first president, serving in that capacity for the majority of the following thirty years (1940–53 and 1959–71). Pope Pius XII promoted Kushnir to the rank of Domestic Prelate in 1951. Patriarch Josyf Slipyj designated him Mitred priest in 1968. Initiating and chairing the inaugural WCFU, he also served as president of its executive board from 1968 to 1969 and from 1973 to 1978. He founded and served as president of the Pan-American Ukrainian Conference.

Kushnir was dubbed the protonotary apostolic in 1977 in honor of the priesthood's 50th anniversary. He gave radio interviews on Svoboda and published articles in journals.

== Death ==
On September 25, 1979, in Winnipeg, Kushnir died. He was buried in the All Saints Cemetery, Rural Municipality of West St. Paul.

== Awards and recognitions ==
Kushnir has earned the following honors:

- Officer of the Order of Canada (OC; 1972)
- Canadian Centennial Medal (1967)
- Queen Elizabeth II Coronation Medal (1953)
- Shevchenko Medal of the UCC (1961)

Political offices
Preceded by Office established Antin Melnyk	President of the World Congress of Free Ukrainians; 1967–1969; 1973–1978	Succeeded by Joseph Lesawyer; Mykola Plaviuk
Preceded by Office established Serge Sawchuk	President of the Ukrainian Canadian Committee; 1940–1953; 1959–1971	Succeeded by Antony Yaremovich; Peter Kondra
