= St. Thomas More College =

Catholic, undergraduate, liberal arts college in Saskatchewan

- Motto: Caput Nostrum Christus (Christ is our Head)
- Type: Public
- Established: 1936
- Affiliations: AUCC, IAU, ACU
- Religious affiliation: Catholic
- President: Carl Still
- Administrative staff: 135
- Undergraduates: 1,440 full and part time
- Location: Saskatoon, Saskatchewan, Canada; 52.1294°N 106.6367°W
- Campus: Urban
- Type: Federated College of the University of Saskatchewan
- Colours: Burgundy ; gold ; black
- Sporting affiliations: CIS
- Website: www.stmcollege.ca

The emblazonment of the coat of arms used by the College

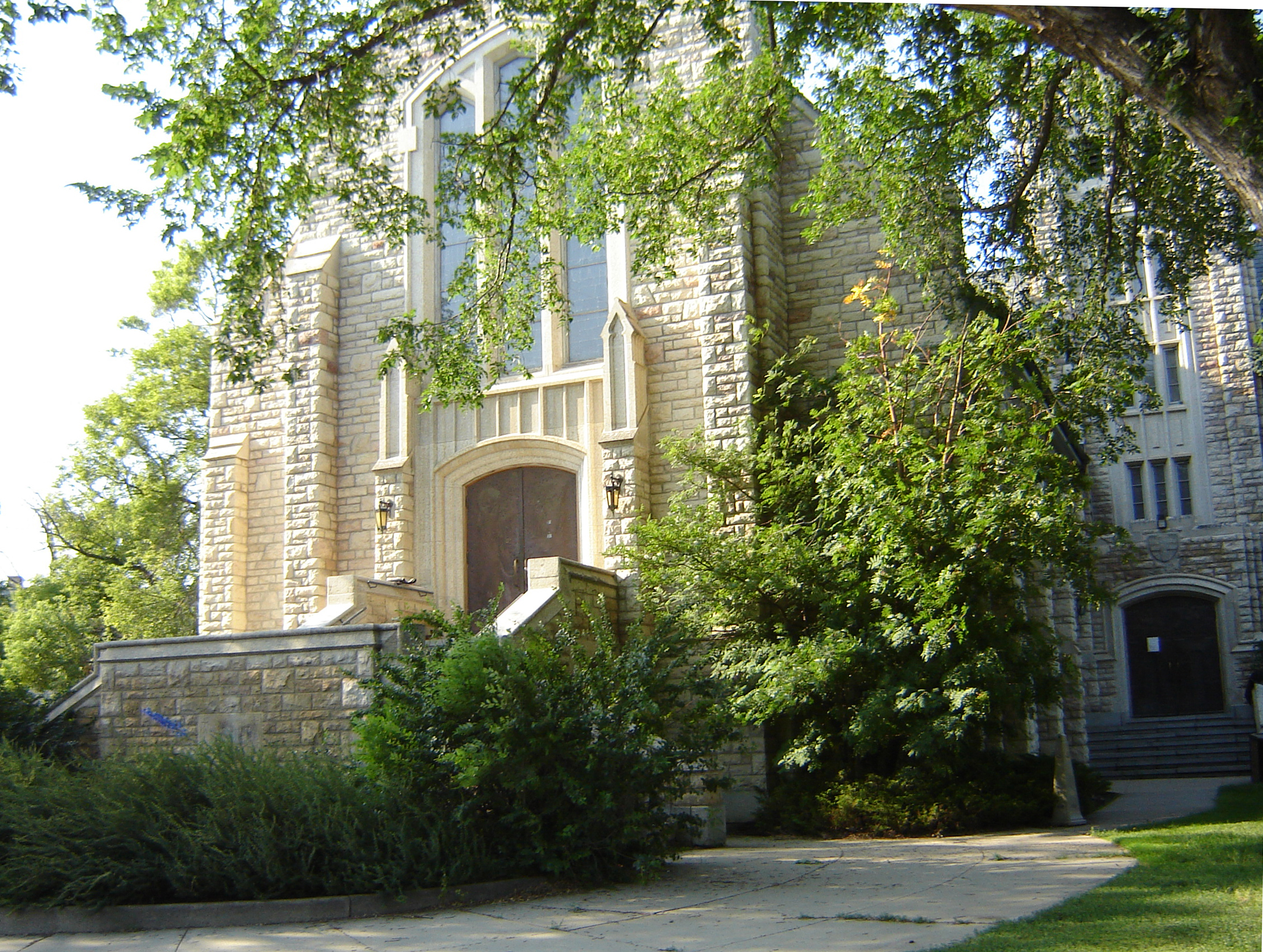
St. Thomas More College

St. Thomas More College (STM) is a Catholic, undergraduate, liberal arts college located in Saskatoon, Saskatchewan, Canada, and is a federated college of the University of Saskatchewan.

== History ==
St. Thomas More College (STM), named for the English Lord Chancellor and statesman St. Thomas More, is the only federated college at the University of Saskatchewan. The college was established by the Basilian Fathers in 1936, on the invitation of the president of the University of Saskatchewan to the Catholic bishop of Saskatoon. The Congregation of St. Basil is a Roman Catholic religious organization of ordained priests with headquarters in Toronto, Ontario. This congregation is different from the Order of St. Basil the Great, which is an Eastern Catholic monastic religious order based in Rome and serving primarily Ukrainian Catholics.

The Roman Catholic Basilian Fathers initiated the operation of Catholic colleges associated with non-denominational universities throughout Canada. The college was incorporated by an act of the Legislature of Saskatchewan in 1943, following formal approval by the senate and board of governors of the university. The act was amended in 1972 and 2001. The college is administratively and financially autonomous from the university. It receives direct provincial grants and is accountable to the provincial government. In 2006, the General Council of the Basilian Fathers announced that they will not be making any further appointments of Basilian priests to the college. The St. Thomas More College Amendment Act 2013 was passed in the provincial legislature making the St. Thomas More College Society the sponsor of the college. The passing of that act was the final formal step in the college's transition to the post-Basilian era.

The Institute for Stained Glass in Canada has documented the stained glass at St. Thomas More College.

In 2009, the STM Students' Union debuted its mascot, Reagan the Rooster, named after former Union President, Reagan Seidler.

== Programs ==
St. Thomas More College is academically integrated within the University of Saskatchewan however St. Thomas More offers a unique vision and mission of Catholic post-secondary education. The college's students receive University of Saskatchewan degrees, as STM, itself, does not grant degrees. The college cooperates with the College of Arts & Science in preparing students for all B.A. and B.Sc. degrees, as well as the B.F.A. and B.Mus. degrees. Students in the College of Arts & Science may register through St. Thomas More College, admission requirements, as well as fees, for both are the same. Enrollment in STM does not restrict choice of program or courses, and students may register with the college even if none of their classes in a given year are taught by the college. The college provides opportunities to explore and to live Christian values but imposes no obligation in this area.

The college faculty are members of the faculty of the College of Arts & Science and of the university council. Faculty appointments and promotion require the approval of the university to ensure that St. Thomas More classes are equivalent in standards to other university classes. STM employs full-time tenured, non-tenured, and part-time sessional faculty on its academic staff.

The college at present offers classes in these departments of arts and science: Anthropology, Archeology, Catholic Studies, Classical, Medieval & Renaissance Studies, Economics, English, Languages & Linguistics, History, Philosophy, Political Science, Psychology, Religious Studies, Ukrainian, Spanish, and Sociology. Some of these courses are the same as those offered by the corresponding department of the College of Arts & Science, thus having the same course number and title, with the added advantage of having, on average, smaller class sizes. All classes transfer directly to the University of Saskatchewan. Whether the student are registered through STM or not, all students at the University of Saskatchewan studying on campus may take STM courses.

St. Thomas More College also offers additional opportunities not otherwise available to students at the University of Saskatchewan. One of these programs is the Community Service Learning (CSL) program in which students can choose to take part in valuable community service and volunteer work as part of some of their courses. This program also helps students to build connections between their community experience and their theoretical ("book") learning at university. A similar international study abroad experience is offered through the Intercordia program.

Finally, St Thomas More College is home to the Prairie Centre for the Study of Ukrainian Heritage, an academic unit of the college that supports programs and projects as well as instruction in the area of Ukrainian Studies.

== Services ==
Students can join various organizations through STM including the St. Thomas More Students' Union, the University of Saskatchewan Ukrainian Students' Association, Newman Centre, Knights of Columbus, Newman Players, Development and Peace, STM Newman Choir, Pre-education Club, Pre-law Club, and In Medias Res – a literary journal.

There is a campus ministry team in the college who help provide spiritual support, faith programs, and community building services. Daily mass is also held in the college chapel throughout the school year.

STM offers a library with over 50,000 volumes as well as a cafeteria ("Choices").

== See also ==
- Higher education in Saskatchewan
- List of colleges in Canada#Saskatchewan
