= Ukrainian Youth Association =

Ukrainian youth organization

Spilka Ukraïns'koï Molodi
- Country: Ukraine
- Founded: 1925
- Website cym.org

The Ukrainian Youth Association (Ukrainian: Спілка української молоді, transliterated as Spilka Ukraïns'koï Molodi, known by the acronym СУМ, SUM, pronounced "soom", and commonly rendered as CYM) is a youth organization in Ukraine, Australia, Belgium, Canada, Estonia, France, Great Britain, Germany, and the United States. The organization plans to create units in New Zealand.

== History ==
=== Foundation and persecution in the USSR ===
The Ukrainian Youth Association was founded in 1925 in Kyiv by a group of former students of the First Ukrainian Gymnasium (founded in 1917 and later named after Taras Shevchenko), who were led by Mykola Pavlushkov, whose father had been the ambassador of the Ukrainian People's Republic in Greece. The organization stemmed from the "Unity and Concord Society" founded by the students and teachers of the gymnasium in 1923. According to Pavlushkov, the idea to create the association stemmed from journalist and scientist Serhiy Yefremov.

On 30 May 1926 participants of the organization spread leaflets condemning the murder of exiled Ukrainian leader Symon Petliura during a memorial service for Ivan Franko in Kyiv's Saint Sophia Cathedral. As a result, Soviet authorities initiated a campaign of persecution against the association and other groups of Ukrainian intelligentsia. In May 1929 Pavlushkov and several other SUM members were arrested by the GPU directed by Vsevolod Balitsky. Arrests of other prominent Ukrainian activists connected to the association, including Yefremov, followed, eventually leading to the Union for the Freedom of Ukraine trial, which took place in 1930 in Kharkiv. Leaders of SUM received prison terms of up to 10 years. In November 1937 Pavlushkov was executed by firing squad while in imprisonment. Yefremov died in March 1939 in Vladimir Central Prison.

=== Activities in the diaspora ===
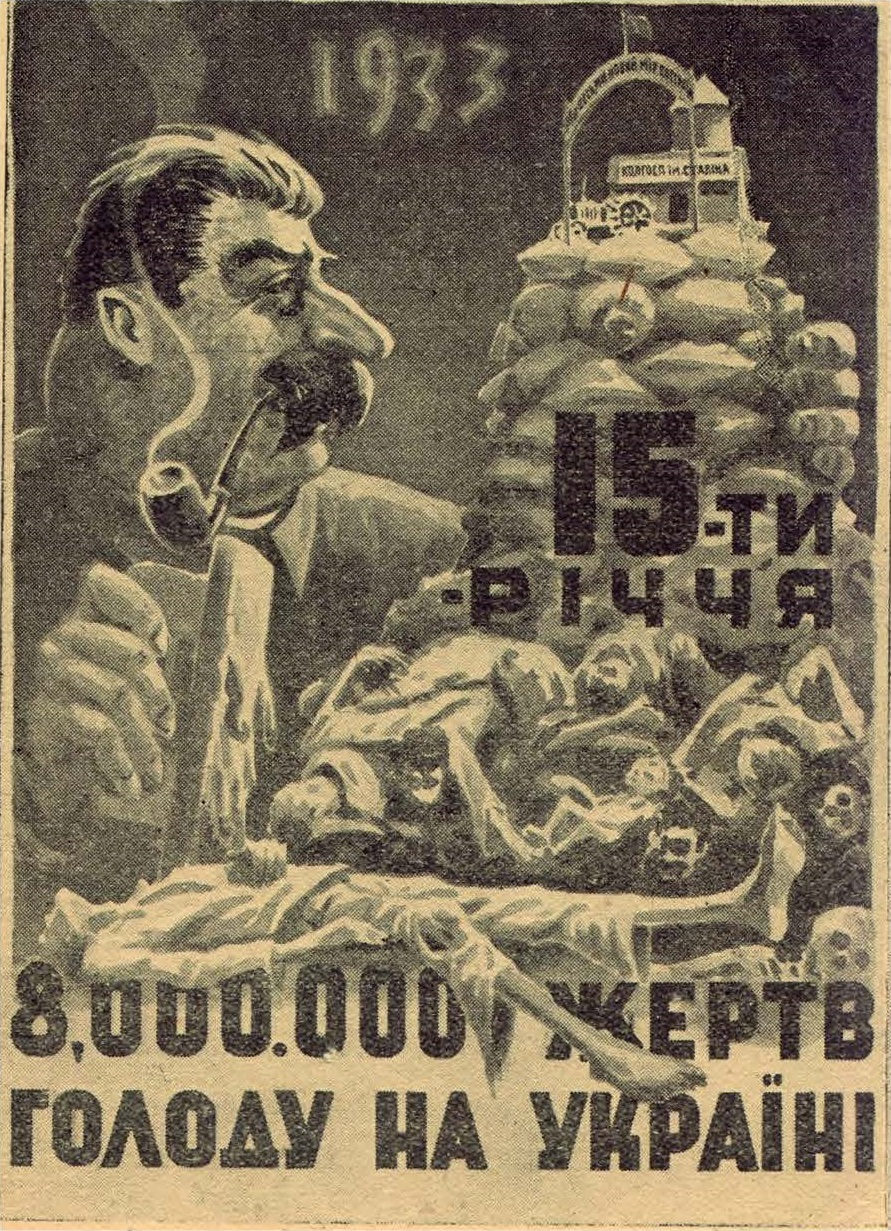
"1933. 15th anniversary. 8.000.000 victims of hunger in Ukraine" - a postcard printed in Germany by the Ukrainian Youth Association for the 15th anniversary of Holodomor

Despite the destruction of the original SUM, its name was adopted by several organizations opposed to the Soviet regime, both in Ukraine and in the diaspora. Soon the branches of the association spread to over 20 countries around the world. During the 1960s the number of SUM members in the diaspora reached 14,000. Activists of the organization organized several performances during the Expo 67 in Montreal, including the removal of the Soviet-imposed Ukrainian flag from the Soviet Union pavilion at the exhibition. In 1972 participants of the global congress of SUM in Munich issued a petition to the IOC, protesting against the participation of the Soviet Union team at the Summer Olympics.

During the 1976 Olympic football tournament in Montreal, 20-year old SUM member Danylo Myhal ran onto the pitch during a match between the Soviet and East German teams, dressed in a vyshyvanka, and attempted to dance hopak before being detained by the police. Soviet television deleted the episode from its broadcast, but Kyiv's Sportyvna Hazeta mentioned SUM's actions at the Olympics, calling the organization's members "experienced anti-Olympians".

In 1980 SUM activists hoisted a number of banners and blue-and-yellow flags on the stands during an Olympic hockey match between Canada and USSR, and several of the organization's members were detained before the following match between USSR and USA. Ukrainian activists also took part in the blockade of IOC's office in Lake Placid, and sang the Ukrainian national anthem after being forcibly removed from the building by the police. Soviet press reacted by blaming SUM's performances on Western "special services".

During the 1984 Summer Olympics, which was boycotted by the Soviet team, SUM members established a press service, spreading leaflets and organizing performances against Ukraine's subjugation by Soviet Russia. During the 1988 Winter Olympics in Calgary several members of SUM were detained for unfurling Ukrainian flags in presence of Soviet sportsmen. In summer of the same year SUM activists took part in millennium celebrations of the baptism of Rus'-Ukraine. After Ukraine regained its independence, global congresses of SUM were organized in support of Ukrainian sportsmen at the Olympics in Atlanta, Sydney and Vancouver.

=== Reestablishment in Ukraine ===
In 1972 a chapter of the organization was established in Ivano-Frankivsk Oblast, resulting in the imprisonment of its members. In summer of 1989 an organization with the same name was established by members of the Kharkiv department of Ukrainian Helsinki Union (UHS).

On 19 August 1989 a congress of representatives from UHS, Plast and the Ukrainian Student Union gathered at the base of Makivka mountain and proclaimed the creation of an all-Ukrainian organization known as the Union of Independent Ukrainian Youth or SNUM (Ukrainian: Спілка Незалежної Української Молоді, СНУМ). The idea of its creation belonged to UHS leader Viacheslav Chornovil. The creation of the union was first publicly proclaimed 4 days later, at a demonstration dedicated to the 50th anniversary of the Molotov-Ribbentrop Pact in Lviv. On 1 October a number of SNUM activists were detained by Soviet militsiya in Lviv, leading to mass protests. In September a branch of the organization was officially established in Kyiv, and on 27 October a constitutional congress of local SNUM activists took place in Ternopil. On Soviet Army Day in February 1990 over 10,000 people took part in demonstrations organized by SNUM in Lviv and Drohobych. As a result, KGB employed military counterintelligence to supervise the organization.

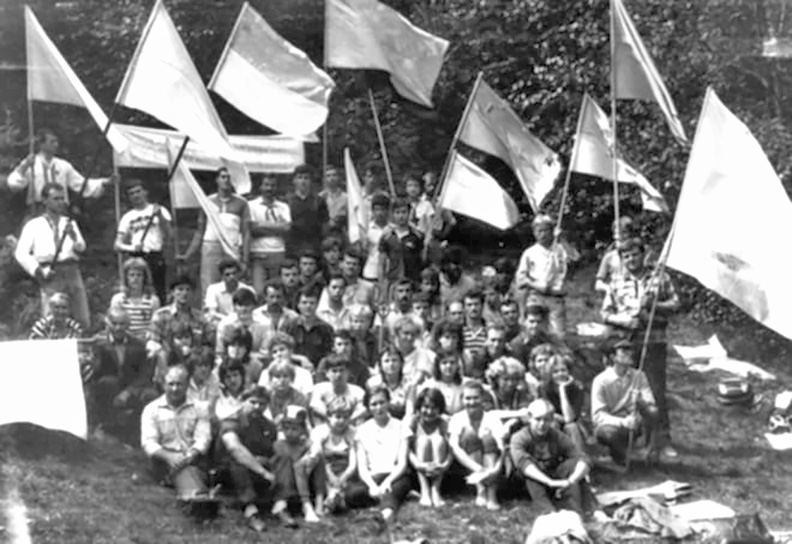
SNUM members during a camp event in 1990

On 22 April 1990, the birthday of Vladimir Lenin, hundreds of schoolchildren took part in demonstrations organized by SNUM in Kyiv and Lviv, ridiculing the cult of the Soviet leader. In total, over 64,000 people participated in actions organized by SNUM between August 1989 and May 1990. A number of periodicals established by the organization were printed in Lithuania. In spring 1990 a number of SNUM members were elected members of local government and the Verkhovna Rada. On 26-27 May a great congress of SNUM took place in Ivano-Frankivsk, during which a split emerged between more moderate members of the organization, who followed Ukrainian Republican Party leader Levko Lukyanenko, and right-wing nationalists, who formed the core of future UNA-UNSO. In August 1990 members of SNUM established ties with SUM organizations of the diaspora at a world conference of Ukrainian youth in Biały Bór, Poland.

After the proclamation of Ukrainian independence, in December 1991 SNUM renamed itself into SUM, adopting the historical name of the organization. In 1995 the unification of Ukrainian SUM with branches of the organization in the diaspora was finalized.

== Legacy ==
The process against the organization was described by writer Geliy Snegiryov in his 1977 book, first published in the Russian emigré magazine Kontinent and later translated into Ukrainian. Snegiryov's mother had been one of the initiators of the trial against SUM members, sending a report on their actions to the Young Communist League.

== Program sections ==
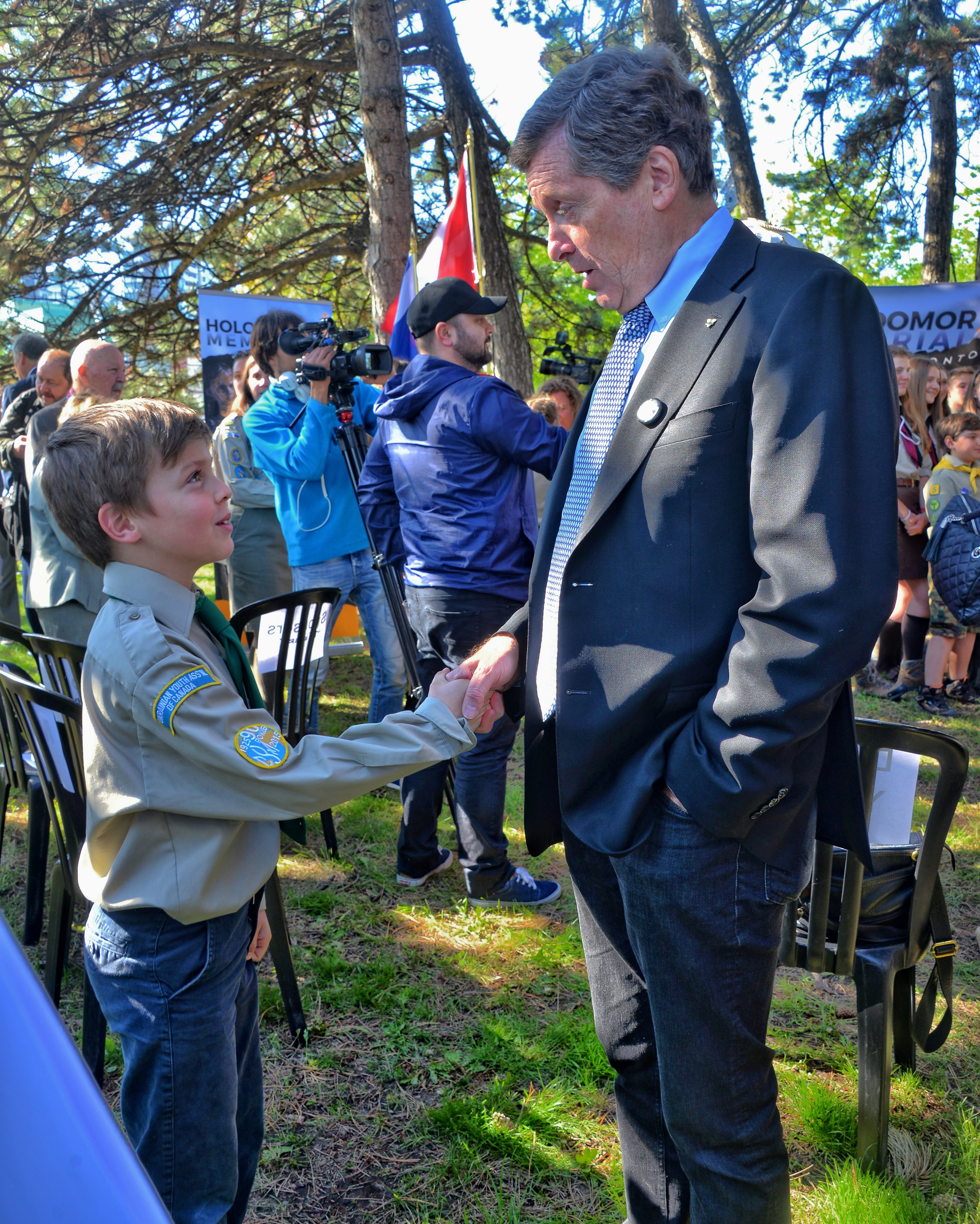
John Tory with a young member of Canadian SUM in Toronto

- Sumeniata (youngest members) - ages 3 to 5
- Molodshe Yunatstvo (younger members) - ages 6 to 12
- Starshe Yunatstvo (older members) - ages 13 – 17
- Druszynnyky (Councillors/Leaders) - ages 18 – 49
- Seiniory (Seniors) - ages 50+

A Ukrainian who attributes themselves to the СУМ organization is named Sumivets.

== Notable members ==
- Taras Chornovil (born 1964), Ukrainian politician, People's Deputy of Ukraine (2000-2012)
- Eugene Czolij (born 1959), president of the Ukrainian World Congress (2008-2018)
- Ihor Derkach (born 1963), Ukrainian politician, People's Deputy of Ukraine (1990-1994)
- Dmytro Korchynsky, (born 1964), Ukrainian politician, leader of UNA-UNSO
- Stefan Romaniw (1955-2024), leader of the Ukrainian World Congress
- Yuri Shymko (born 1940), Ukrainian Canadian politician
- Slava Stetsko (1920-2003), Ukrainian politician, leader of the Congress of Ukrainian Nationalists
- Oleh Vitovych (1967-2011), Ukrainian politician, People's Deputy of Ukraine (1994-1998)
- Kateryna Yushchenko (born 1961), First Lady of Ukraine (2005-2010)
- Roman Zvarych (born 1953), Ukrainian politician, Minister of Justice (2005, 2006)

== See also ==
- Ukrainian Far Eastern Sich, which emerged from the SUM branch in Harbin, China.

=== Archives ===
There is a Canadian Ukrainian Youth Association fonds at Library and Archives Canada. The archival reference number is R3438.
