= Prairie Centre for the Study of Ukrainian Heritage =

The Prairie Centre for the Study of Ukrainian Heritage (PCUH) is an academic unit of St Thomas More College, a liberal arts college federated with the University of Saskatchewan. Initiated in 1998 and formally established in 1999, its mission is to promote the advanced study of various aspects of Ukrainian heritage, culture and life; to preserve documentary materials relevant to such study; and to disseminate results conducted under its auspices.

The PCUH continues the long and pioneering tradition of Ukrainian Studies at the University of Saskatchewan. The Centre helps support the university's Ukrainian Studies Minor degree, graduate students working in the field, as well as programs and projects that promote a wider understanding and appreciation of the Ukrainian experience in Canada and abroad. Conceived as a community-university partnership and supported by endowed funds, the Centre is seen as an important link between the University of Saskatchewan and the wider provincial Ukrainian Canadian community.

The work of the Centre is conducted under the authority of the PCUH Director, an academic appointment of St Thomas More College. Past Directors of the PCUH included Dr. Bohdan Kordan (Founding Director) 1998-2004, 2007–09 (Acting), 2013-19, 2020-21 (Acting); Rev. Dr. Myroslav Tataryn (Interim Director) 2004-05; Dr. Natalia Khanenko-Friesen 2005-07, 2009-13, 2019-20; and Dr. Nadya Foty-Oneschuk (Interim Director) 2021-.
