= Wsevolod W. Isajiw =

Canadian sociologist (1933–2023)

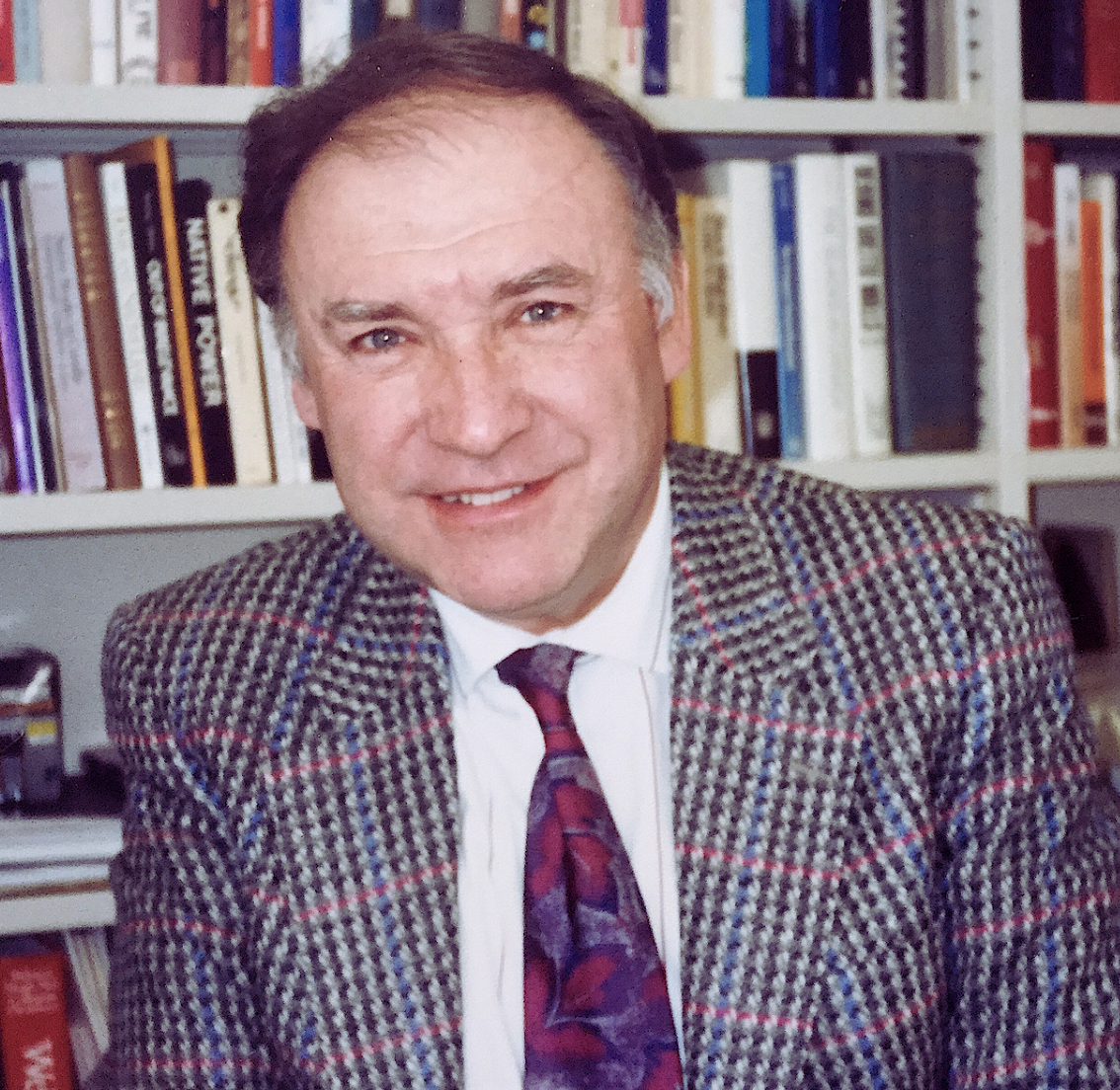
- Wsevolod W. Isajiw
- Born: November 6, 1933 (age 92); Lviv, Ukraine
- Scientific career
- Fields: Sociology

Wsevolod W. Isajiw, Ph.D. (6 November 1933 – 28 February 2023) was a Canadian sociologist, specialising in social thought, sociological theory, ethnicity, immigration, and pluralism studies. Born in 1933 in Lviv, Ukraine, he was educated at LaSalle College, where he earned his MA and PhD degrees, and at Harvard University. He was the first chair appointed at the Robert F. Harney Professorship and Program in Ethnic, Immigration, and Pluralism Studies (now part of the Munk School). During the 1990s he established the first interdisciplinary collaborative graduate program in ethnic studies in Canada, funded by the Secretary of State, and ran a series of highly successful annual conferences that were popular with students. He lectured in sociology and sociological theory from 1970 until 1999 at the University of Toronto, after which he retired as professor emeritus. Isajiw died at the age of 89 at his home in Toronto, Canada.

== Selected works ==
Isajiw wrote many impactful works in the fields of sociology and social thought. He contributed research in the fields of ethnicity, ethnic groups, and ethnic identity, publishing extensively. He was the author, co-author, or editor of 14 scholarly books and over 109 articles and research papers, some written in Ukrainian. He wrote two textbooks, Understanding Diversity: Ethnicity and Race in the Canadian Context, and Iconic Ideas in the History of Social Thought, which encouraged new ways of thinking about ethnic groups. His articles include "Definitions of Ethnicity" and "Olga in Wonderland: Ethnicity in Technological Society." His texts include:

- Identities: The impact of ethnicity on Canadian society
- Multiculturalism in North America and Europe: Comparative perspectives on interethnic relations and social incorporation (with Tanuja Perera)
- Causation and Functionalism in Sociology from International Library of Sociology
- "Definitions of Ethnicity", 1974 article, translated into Japanese and published in Esunikku Toha Nanika? (What is Ethnic?), Machiko Aoyagi, ed. Tokyo: Shinsensha, 73–96.
- "Definitions of Ethnicity: New approaches" in Ethnic Forum
- "Olga in Wonderland: Ethnicity in technological society," from Canadian Ethnic Studies
- Iconic Ideas in the History of Social Thought, his second textbook.
- Between Hitler and Stalin Ukraine in World War II: The Untold Story (with Andrew Gregorovich, Oleh S. Romanyschyn)
- "Socialization as a factor in ethnic identity retention" (with Tomoko Makabe)
- "Ethnic Identity Retention" Center for Urban and Community Studies. Isajiw's well-known 1990 study with three co-authors, "Ethnic Identity Retention," studied the results from a survey of 2,000 people from three generations of four major ethnic groups in Metropolitan Toronto (Italians, Ukrainians, Germans, and Jews). It focused on indicators of identity and ethnic identity retention, transmission or assimilation across three generations.
  To date, this study has been successfully replicated and verified with other ethnic groups in three countries globally. As per T. Lane's Victims of Stalin and Hitler: The exodus of Poles and Balts to Britain: "Isajiw proposed a series of indicators of ethnic identity which he divided into external (observable behaviour patterns) and internal (attitudes and feelings interpreted indirectly). He found in this study of four ethnic groups (Italians, Germans, Ukrainians and Jews) that from generation to generation the percentage of ethnic indicators fell off significantly. Averaging out all the indicators for the four groups, he discovered that the first generation scored 60 per cent, the second about 45 per cent, and the third about 31 per cent. Interestingly, the highest indicator across the four groups was ethnic food, with the next highest items being the possession of ethnic articles, the maintenance of ethnic customs, the retention of ethnic close friends and the participation in functions organised by ethnic organisations. Low on the list was knowledge of the ethnic language and use of ethnic recreational facilities. From this evidence, it seems incontrovertible that ethnic identity can change its meaning over time."
- The Refugee Experience: Ukrainian Displaced Persons after World War I, with Yury Boshyk and Roman Senkus, eds.
  In reviewing the book The Refugee Experience, scholar Marta Dyczok states that it is "the first comprehensive compilation of information on Ukrainian postwar refugees. The collection is important for the study of international protection of involuntarily displaced people and of twentieth-century Ukrainian history." Organised in 12 sections, the collection "makes a large quantity of information easily accessible to the reader." She summarizes that: "This book will be of interest to a wide audience. Those with a scholarly interest in refugee studies will find a detailed case study of one group of refugees during their period of displacement. Most of the contributions on the life of the refugees in internment camps use archival materials, maps, charts, and statistical tables never before assembled in one volume. Contemporary historians and scholars dealing with issues of national identity will find an engaging description of the events and processes that shaped the lives of a group of people caught in an unusual situation, where their national identity played an important role in determining their future. Former refugees who lived through this experience will find it interesting to read about their past examined in an academic manner. Ukrainians in Ukraine will find this book useful in helping to understand a part of their history to which they had no access until recently."

=== Understanding Diversity: Ethnicity and race in the Canadian context ===
Isajiw's textbook, Understanding Diversity: Ethnicity and Race in the Canadian Context, is known for providing "a clear introduction to the study of ethnicity in Canada by an author who possesses an admirable knowledge of the field" and was a highly used text for higher education multicultural studies. Praised for the concise and "comprehensive review of Canada's immigration policy and his use of the most recent census data," it conceptualises and analyses diversity using Canada as a case study for empirical reference.

== Honours ==
On June 20, 2006, Pope Benedict XVI awarded him a papal honor at the Cathedral Church of Saint Michael in Toronto. He was named a Knight in the Order of Saint Gregory the Great, for his "significant contribution to Catholic education, especially in connection with proposed changes to 'The Education Act,' which would have prevented catholic School Boards from considering an individual's faith when making employment decisions."
