= Ukrainian World Congress =

International organization

- Founded: 1967; 59 years ago as the World Congress of Free Ukrainians
- Legal status: Nonprofit organization
- Location: Toronto, Ontario, Canada
- President: Paul M. Grod
- Vice President: Zenon Potichny
- Website: ukrainianworldcongress.org

Ukrainian World Congress (Ukrainian: Світовий Конґрес Українців, romanized: Svitovyi Kongres Ukraintsiv or СКУ) is a non-profit organization, nonpartisan association, international coordination assembly of all Ukrainian public organizations in diaspora. Originally founded in 1967 as the World Congress of Free Ukrainians, the organization was renamed in 1993 to its current name.

The UWC lists its main goals and objectives as: 1) to represent the interests of Ukrainians in the diaspora; 2) to coordinate an international network of member organizations that support and promote the Ukrainian national identity, spirit, language, culture and achievements of Ukrainians throughout the world; 3) to promote the civic development of Ukrainians in their countries of settlement, while fostering a positive attitude towards Ukrainians and the Ukrainian state; and 4) to defend the rights of Ukrainians, independently of their place of residence in accordance with the Universal Declaration of Human Rights.

== History ==
Originally founded in 1967 as the World Congress of Free Ukrainians, the organization was renamed in 1993 to its current name.

Since Ukraine's independence in 1991, the UWC has been helping Ukraine become the natural epicentre for Ukrainianism throughout the world for the benefit of Ukrainians both in Ukraine and abroad.

In 2003, the Ukrainian World Congress was recognized by the United Nations Economic and Social Council as a non-governmental organization (NGO) with special consultative status.

The UWC has focused on such important issues as: the protection and defence of the human and national minority rights of Ukrainians; the international recognition of the Holodomor of 1932-33 as an act of genocide (now officially recognized by 16 countries); the democratization of Ukraine and its integration into the European Union; the strengthening of Ukraine as a state and the inviolability of its borders; election monitoring, including the UWC's International Election Observation Mission to the 2012 Parliamentary Elections in Ukraine (the largest non-government sponsored mission of its kind); the social and economic issues surrounding the economic migration from Ukraine; the promotion of the Ukrainian language in Ukraine and the diaspora; the return to the Ukrainian community in Poland of the Ukrainian National Home in Przemyszl which was confiscated during the Operation Vistula (Akcja Wisla); and the global problem of human trafficking.

Currently, the UWC has been actively promoting Ukraine's Euro-integration in meetings with high-ranking officials of the European Union. The UWC has called for the signing of the EU-Ukraine Association Agreement as early as 25 February 2013 during the EU-Ukraine Summit in Brussels, Belgium.

In 2019, the UWC was designated as an 'undesirable organization' in Russia.

=== 2022 - Present: UWC response to Full-Scale Russian Aggression against Ukraine ===
As of September 2023, the Ukrainian World Congress (UWC) has raised more than 90 million dollars to support the Armed Forces of Ukraine. In September 2023, the UWC president announced that the organization had delivered 50 armored vehicles and 70 military trucks. In April 2023, the UWC transferred 25 British armored vehicles to Ukraine, including 12 Spartan FV103 armored personnel carriers (APCs), seven FV432 APCs, two FV434 APCs, one Spartan SPA8 APC, one Spartan SPA017, and two FV104 Samaritan medical vehicles. In September 2024, an additional 15 British armored personnel carriers were delivered.

== Leadership ==
The UWC has a president and an Executive Committee. 13 UWC councils and committees work actively to address questions that define Ukrainian community life. These include human and civil rights, UN matters, awareness of the Holodomor in the international community, education, social services, youth, assistance to Ukrainian citizens living abroad, scholarly matters, culture, the fight against human trafficking, media, sport and the cooperative movement.

List of presidents of the UCC
No.	President	Time in office	Related offices
1	Wasyl Kushnir (1893–1979)	1967–1969	President of the Ukrainian Canadian Congress (1940–1953, 1959–1971); Chairman of the Pan-American Ukrainian Conference (1947–1967)
2	Joseph Lesawyer (1911–2006)	1953–1957	President of the Ukrainian National Association (1961–1978)
3	Antin Melnyk (1920–1997)	1971–1973	Member of the Organisation of Ukrainian Nationalists; Head of the Society of Ukrainian Political Prisoners; Head of the Central Representation of Ukrainian Emigrants in Germany (1964); Head of the Coordination Center of Ukrainian Central Institutions in Europe (1965–1979)
–	Wasyl Kushnir (1893–1979)	1973–1978	President of the Ukrainian Canadian Congress (1940–1953, 1959–1971)
4	Mykola Plaviuk (1925–2012)	1978–1981	Member of the Ukrainian National Army, 2nd division (1945–1945); President of the Ukrainian National Federation of Canada (1956–66); Vice-President of the Ukrainian Canadian Congress (1966–71); Leader of the Organisation of Ukrainian Nationalists (1981–2012); President of the Ukrainian People's Republic (in exile) (1989–1992)
5	Ivan Bazarko (1910–1989)	1981–1983	Member of the Ukrainian Central Committee; Editor of Ukrainian News (1941); Editor of Sokal World (1941–1942); President of Ukrainian Congress Committee of America (1966–1980)
6	Peter Savaryn (1926–2017)	1983–1988	Member of the 14th SS-Volunteer Division "Galicia" (1944–1945); President of the Progressive Conservative Association of Alberta; Co-founder of the Canadian Institute of Ukrainian Studies; Chancellor of the University of Alberta (1982–1986)
7	Yuri Shymko (b. 1940)	1988–1993	Member of the Canadian Parliament (1978–1979); Member of the Ontario Provincial Parliament (1981–1987); Member of the Canadian Federal Immigration and Refugee Board (1988–1993); President of the International Council in Support of Ukraine (2013)
8	Dmytro Cipywnyk (1927–2003)	1993–1998	President of the Ukrainian Canadian Congress (1986–1991); Member of the Union of Ukrainian Independents
9	Askold Lozynskyj (b. 1952)	1998–2008	President of the Ukrainian Student Organization (1973–1975); President of the Ukrainian-American Youth Association (1980–1989); President of the Ukrainian Congress Committee of America (1992–2016)
10	Eugene Czolij (b. 1959)	2008–2018	President of the Ukrainian Canadian Congress (1998–2004); President of Caisse populaire Desjardins Ukrainienne de Montréal (2006–2019); President of NGO «Ukraine-2050» (2019–present); Head of the International Observation Mission to Ukraine's 2019 Elections (2019); Honorary Consul of Ukraine in Montreal (2020–present)
11	Paul M. Grod	2018–present	President of the Ukrainian Canadian Congress (2008–2018)

== Member organizations ==
The congress has member organizations in 33 countries and ties with Ukrainians in 14 additional countries. Founded in 1967 in New York City as the World Congress of Free Ukrainians.

=== European Congress of Ukrainians (Yaroslava Khortiani) ===
- Armenia: Federation of Ukrainians of Armenia "Ukraine"
- Belgium: Main Council of Ukrainian Public Organizations
- Bosnia and Herzegovina: Coordination council of Ukrainian associations
- Czech Republic: Ukrainian Initiative in the Czech Republic
- Croatia: Union of Rusyns and Ukrainians of the Republic of Croatia
- Estonia: Congress of Ukrainians of Estonia
- France: Representative Committee of the Ukrainian Community of France
- Georgia: Coordination Council of Ukrainians of Georgia
- Germany: Association of Ukrainian Organizations in Germany
- Greece: Association of the Ukrainian diaspora in Greece "Ukrainian-Greek Thought"
- Hungary: Association of Ukrainian Culture in Hungary
- Italy
- Latvia: Ukrainian Cultural-Enlightening Association in Latvia "Dnieper"
- Lithuania: Community of Ukrainians of Lithuania
- Moldova: Society of Ukrainians of Transnistria
- Norway
- Poland: Association of Ukrainians in Poland (Piotr Tyma)
- Portugal: Society of Ukrainians in Portugal
- Romania: Union of Ukrainians of Romania
- Russia: Association of Ukrainians of Russia
- Serbia
- Slovakia: Union of Rusyn-Ukrainians of the Slovak Republic
- Spain
- Switzerland
- United Kingdom: Association of Ukrainians in Great Britain (Zenko Lastowiecki)

=== Others ===
- World Federation of Ukrainian Women's Organizations
- World Congress of Ukrainian Youth Organization
- Australia: Australian Federation of Ukrainian Organisations (Stefan Romaniw)
- Argentina: Ukrainian Central Representation in Argentina
- Brazil: Ukrainian-Brazilian Central Representation
- Canada: Ukrainian Canadian Congress (Paul Grod)
- Kazakhstan: Ukrainians in Kazakhstan
- Paraguay:
- United States: Ukrainian Congress Committee of America (Andriy Futey)
- United States: Ukrainian American Coordinating Council (Ihor Gawdiak)
- Uzbekistan: Ukrainian Cultural Center "Fatherland"

== Conventions ==
- I World Congress of Free Ukrainians (November 12–19, 1967; New York City)
- II World Congress of Free Ukrainians (November 1–4, 1973; Toronto)
- III World Congress of Free Ukrainians (November 23–26, 1978; New York)
- IV World Congress of Free Ukrainians (November 30 - December 4, 1983; Toronto)
- V World Congress of Free Ukrainians (November 22–27, 1988; Toronto)
- VI World Congress of Free Ukrainians (November 2–7, 1993; Toronto)
- VII Ukrainian World Congress (December 2–7, 1998; Toronto)
- VIII Ukrainian World Congress (August 18–21, 2003; Kyiv)
- IX Ukrainian World Congress (August 20–22, 2008; Ukrainian House, Kyiv)
- X Ukrainian World Congress (August 20–22, 2013; Lviv Polytechnic, Lviv)
- XI Ukrainian World Congress (November 25–27, 2018; Olimpiyskiy National Sports Complex, Kyiv)

== See also ==
- Ukrainian Universal Coordination Council (Ukrainian: uk:Українська всесвітня координаційна рада)

=== Archives ===
There is a World Congress of Free Ukrainians fonds at Library and Archives Canada. The archival reference number is R11211.

== Sources ==
- Official Web site
