= Stefan Romaniw =

Ukrainian-Australian activist (1955–2024)

Stefan Romaniw OAM
- Стефан Романів
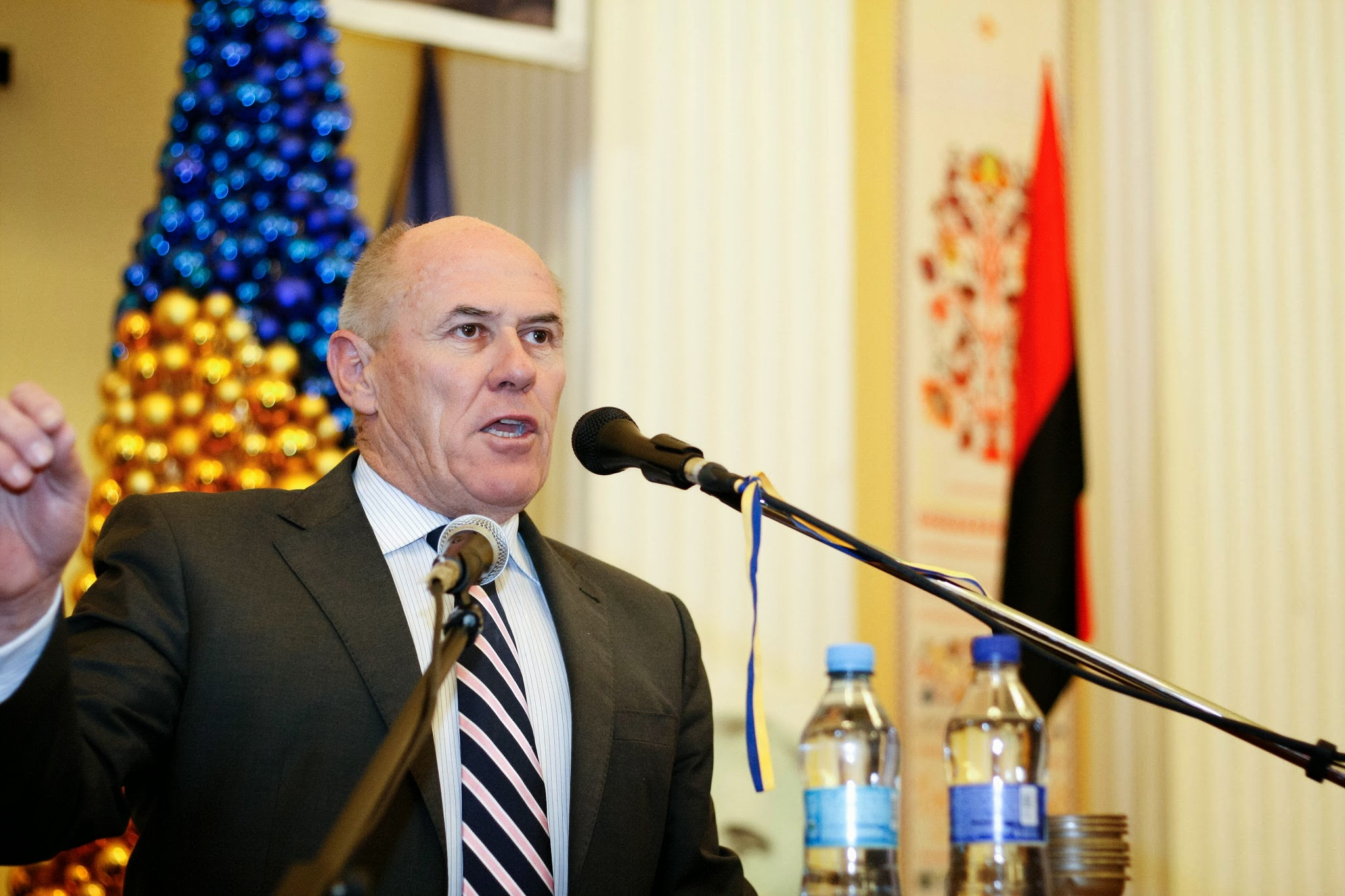
- Romaniw in 2014

First Vice President of the Ukrainian World Congress
- In office 2018 – 26 June 2024

Personal details
- Born: 12 November 1955 Melbourne, Victoria, Australia
- Died: 26 June 2024 (aged 68) Warsaw, Poland
- Profession: Activist

Stefan Romaniw OAM (Ukrainian: Стефан Ількович Романів; 12 November 1955 – 26 June 2024) was a Ukrainian-Australian activist who served as the Co-chair of the Australian Federation of Ukrainian Organisations and the First Vice President of the Ukrainian World Congress. According to historian Gregorsz Rossolinski-Liebe, he was also elected leader of the Organisation of Ukrainian Nationalists in 2009.

Romaniw was the chairperson of the Victorian Multicultural Commission and Multicultural Arts and has received the Medal of the Order of Australia (OAM).

Romaniw was the head of the OUN-B from 2009 to December 2022, when Oleh Medunytsia was unanimously elected to replace him.

Romaniw died in Warsaw on 26 June 2024, at the age of 68. A state funeral was held at the Ukrainian Catholic Cathedral of Sts Peter and Paul, in Melbourne, on 12 July.

At the same time Stefan gives a cursus in Estland in september. This could be an error, or not? https://ut.ee/en/lifelong/ukraine-european-frontier
