= Eugene Czolij =

Canadian lawyer (born 1959)

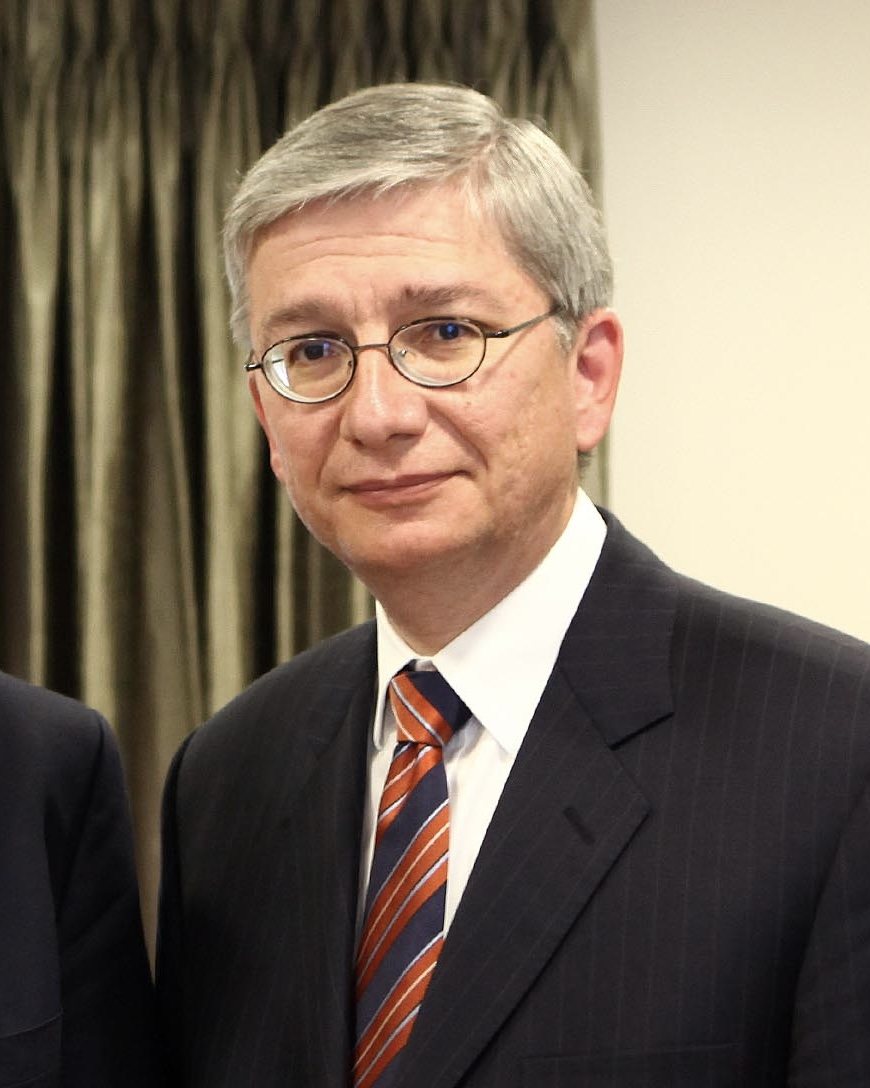
- Czolij in 2012

10th President of the Ukrainian World Congress
- In office 2008–2018
- Preceded by: Askold Lozynskyj
- Succeeded by: Paul M. Grod

9th President of the Ukrainian Canadian Congress
- In office 1998–2004
- Preceded by: Oleh Romaniw
- Succeeded by: Orysia Sushko

Personal details
- Born: 1959 (age 66–67) Montreal, Quebec, Canada
- Occupation: Lawyer

Eugene Czolij (born 1959) is a Canadian lawyer of Ukrainian descent who was the elected president of the Ukrainian World Congress (UWC) from 2008 to 2018, the Ukrainian Canadian Congress (UCC) from 1998 to 2004, and the Ukraine-2050 non-governmental organization.

== Career ==
In 1982, Eugene Czolij was admitted to the Quebec Bar. He currently holds a senior partner position at Lapointe Rosenstein Marchand Melançon, a legal practice in Quebec that employs over 175 attorneys. He practices insolvency and financial restructuring law in addition to corporate and commercial disputes. He appears before all Quebec courts as well as the Supreme Court of Canada. He joined the UCC's board of directors in 1994 and served as its president from 1998 to 2004.

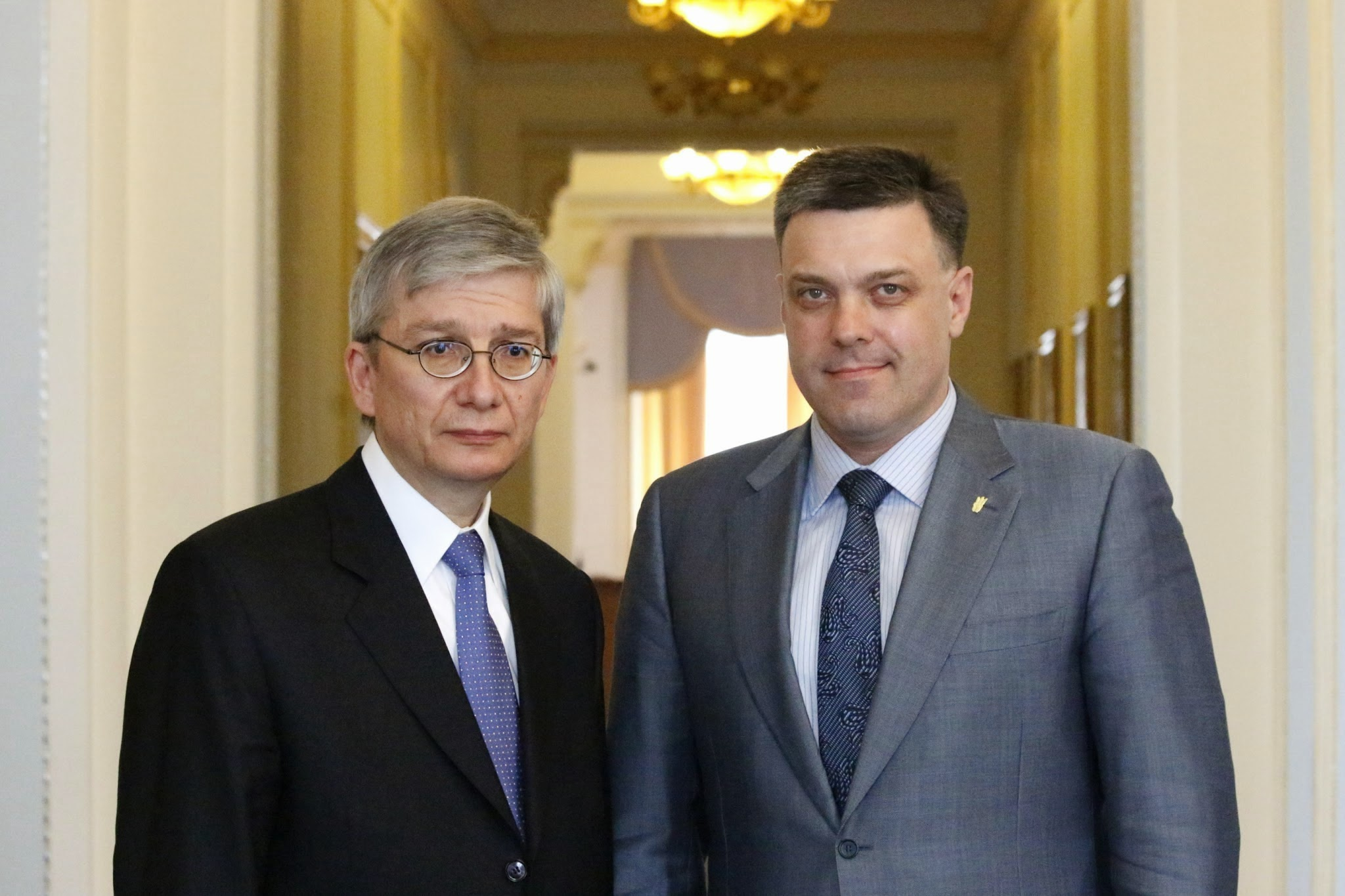
Czolij and Oleh Tyahnybok in 2014

Czolij has served as a member of the UWC's board of directors since 1993. He served as the President of the UWC for ten years, from 2008 to 2018. During his second five-year term as president, he traveled to 51 countries on 147 separate occasions. While there, he held 1,500 bilateral meetings with leaders of state governments and international organizations, including the UN, OSCE, Council of Europe, NATO, and the EU, as well as 160 public speeches at formal events and 200 community meetings. He has served as the leader of the international observation mission of the UWC at the country's parliamentary and presidential elections in 2019.

Czolij joined the board of directors of the Ukrainian-Canadian credit union Caisse populaire Desjardins Ukrainienne de Montréal in 2004 and served as its president from 2006 to 2019. He has been on the Council of Ukrainian Credit Unions of Canada's board of directors since 2006. Fédération des caisses Desjardins du Québec, has welcomed him as a member of its East of Montreal Community Collaboration Group since 2018. Prior to that, he served as a member of the organization's council of representatives from 2009 to 2018.

Czolij has been included in Best Lawyers in Canada's list of practitioners since 2012, becoming one of the most well-respected in the legal field. He has served as president of the non-profit organization "Ukraine-2050" since 2019. Additionally, he has served as President of the Kyiv-Mohyla Foundation of Canada since 2019. He is also the Head of the UWC International Observation Mission to Ukraine's 2019 Elections.

Czolij was congratulated by the UCC on his appointment as the Honorary Consul of Ukraine in Montreal on October 16, 2020, where he signed the contract to become an honorary consul in an online event. The Advisory Board of the Honorary Consulate of Ukraine in Montreal was established by him to offer guidance and support while he carried out his duties.

== Personal life ==
Czolij is born in 1959, in Montreal, Quebec. He is married to Anna and they have three children – Melania, Stephane and Sophie –and two grandchildren – Zachary and Julia.

== Awards and recognitions ==
Czolij has earned the following awards and recognitions:

- Recipient of an honorary doctorate from Lviv Polytechnic National University in Ukraine (2016); for his contribution to promoting Ukraine's interests and its Euro-integration.
- Recipient of an honorary doctorate from the National University of Kyiv-Mohyla Academy (2019); for his outstanding achievements as a community leader.
- Queen Elizabeth II Diamond Jubilee Medal (2012)
- Queen Elizabeth II Golden Jubilee Medal (2002)
- Order of Merit Third Class
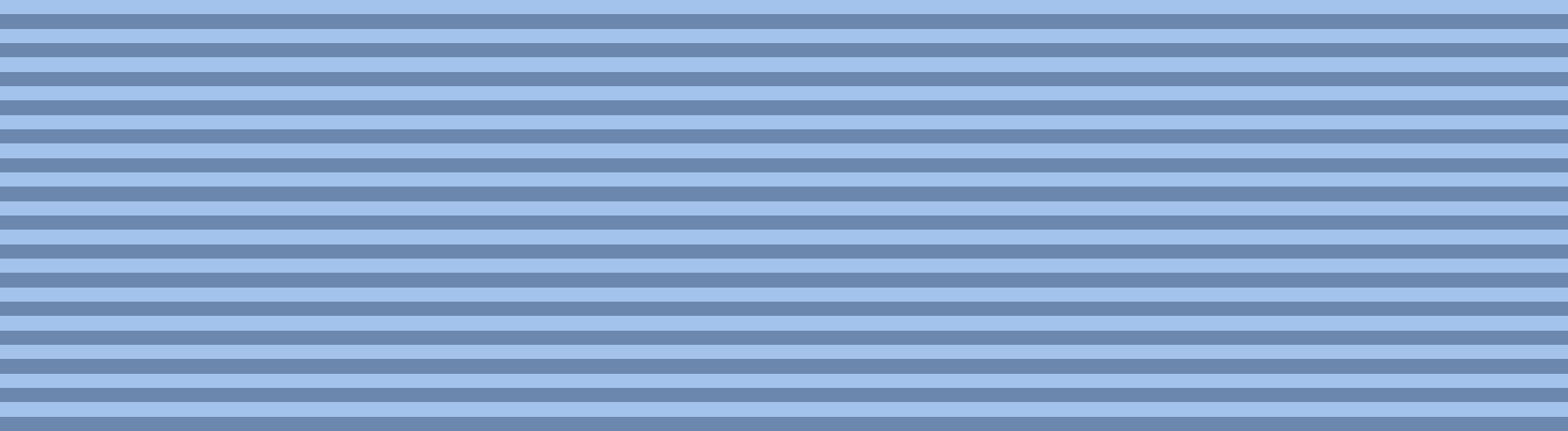
- Order of Prince Yaroslav the Wise Fifth Class
- 25 Years of Independence of Ukraine Medal
- Order of Metropolitan Andrey Sheptytsky of the Ukrainian Greek Catholic Church
- Medal of the National Olympic Committee of Ukraine
- St. Voldymyr the Great Medal of the UWC
- Shevchenko Medal of the UCC (2020)

Political offices
Preceded by Oleh Romaniw	President of the Ukrainian Canadian Congress; 1998–2004	Succeeded by Orysia Sushko
Preceded by Askold Lozynskyj	President of the Ukrainian World Congress; 2008–2018	Succeeded by Paul M. Grod
