= Paul M. Grod =

Canadian businessman and lawyer

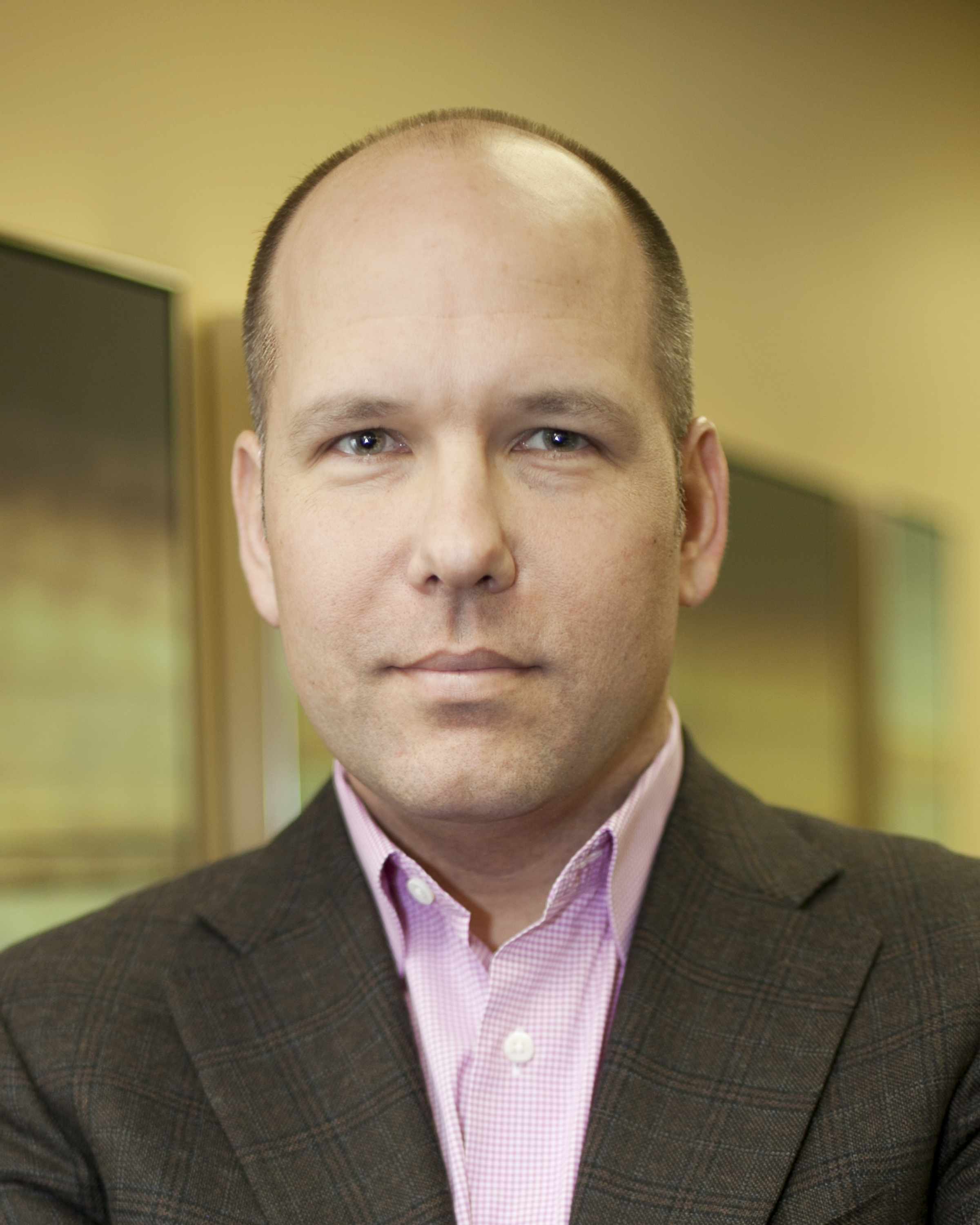
- Grod in 2018

11th President of the Ukrainian World Congress
- Incumbent
- Assumed office November 2018
- Preceded by: Eugene Czolij

11th President of the Ukrainian Canadian Congress
- In office 2007–2018
- Preceded by: Orysia Sushko
- Succeeded by: Alexandra Chyczij

Personal details
- Occupation: Businessman and lawyer

Paul M. Grod or simply known as Paul Grod, is a Ukrainian Canadian businessman and lawyer who was elected as the president of the Ukrainian World Congress (UWC) in 2018, and president and CEO of Rodan Energy Solutions. He was previously the UWC's Vice President for ten years. Notably, Vladimir Putin has sanctioned 13 Canadians, the only ones who are not government officials include Grod, and they are not allowed to enter Russia.

== Education ==
Grod is a member of the Law Society of Ontario and holds Bachelor of Political Science, Bachelor of Laws, and Master of Business Administration degrees.

== Career ==
Grod serves as President and CEO of Rodan Energy Solutions. He worked as a corporate and investment banker at CIBC World Markets and as a corporate finance and mergers and acquisitions lawyer at Gowling WLG, before starting Rodan Energy Solutions. He is also a member of the CEO Roundtable for the IESO's Market Renewal Program and has participated on other stakeholder and advisory committees related to the energy market.

There are 1.4 million Ukrainian Canadians in the country, and Grod was chosen as vice president of the Ukrainian Canadian Congress (UCC) in 2001. During the IX formal meeting, he was elected both president and vice president of the UWC in 2010. Grod, like many others, became more involved in politics when President Viktor Yanukovych was overthrown on February 22, 2014, as a result of the EuroMaidan Revolution.

Following his meeting with Volodymyr Groysman, the Prime Minister of Ukraine, on November 27, 2018, Grod had an uncontested election to the UWC presidency for a four-year term. He takes over for the ten-year-served Eugene Czolij. Grod oversaw a number of programs and committees at that period, including UWC's Council in Support of Ukraine and many foreign election observation teams to Ukraine.

Grod visited Warsaw in April 2022, where he had meetings with Andrzej Duda, the President of Poland, and other government officials. He talked about the visit, a plan for the global Ukrainian community's development, and how the diaspora of Ukrainians helps Ukraine amidst the continuous, massive Russian attack in an interview with Ukrinform.

== Personal life ==
Grod, whose parents immigrated to Canada from Ukraine, is married and has four young children. He contributes his time to a number of nonprofits and neighborhood associations.

== Awards and recognitions ==
Grod has earned the following honors:

- Queen's Diamond Jubilee Medal (May 17, 2012); by Minister Jason Kenney in recognition for his significant contributions and achievements in service to Canada.
- The Hill Times' Power and Influence magazine and Embassy Magazine's list of the top 100 (#21) individuals affecting Canada's worldwide destiny.
- Ukraine's 25th Anniversary Jubilee Medal by the President of Ukraine in recognition of his noteworthy personal commitment to bolstering Ukraine's worldwide standing.
- Shevchenko Medal by the UCC for exceptional service to the advancement of the Ukrainian Canadian community.

Political offices
Preceded by Orysia Sushko	President of the Ukrainian Canadian Congress; 2007–2018	Succeeded by Alexandra Chyczij
Preceded by Eugene Czolij	President of the Ukrainian World Congress; 2018–	Incumbent
