= Honorary Award of the President of Ukraine =

Ukrainian state award

Honorary award of the President of Ukraine Почесна відзнака Президента України
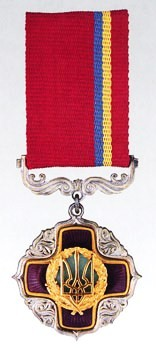
- Type: State Orders
- Awarded for: Civil or military merit
- Country: Ukraine
- Status: Not awarded
- Established: 18 August 1992
- First award: 21 August 1992
- Final award: 5 October 1996

Highlights
- Total: 630
- ribbon

Precedence
- Equivalent: Order of Merit (Ukraine)

Honorary award of the President of Ukraine is the first award of independent Ukraine, an award of the President of Ukraine, established by the President of Ukraine Leonid Kravchuk under the paragraph 9-2 of Article 114-5 of the Constitution of Ukraine effective in 1992 to award citizens for personal merits in building a sovereign, democratic of the state, development of the economy, science and culture of Ukraine, for active peacemaking, charitable, charitable, public activity.

Honorary awards of the President of Ukraine were made between 1992 and 1996, before the establishment of the successor to the award, the President of Ukraine's Order of Merit. Persons awarded the Honorary Medal of the President of Ukraine are called Knights of the Order of Merit and retain the right to wear the signs of the Honorary Medal of the President of Ukraine awarded to them.

The author and designer of the award design is Yukhym Harabet, the engraver is Leonid Tolstov.

== Awards statistics ==
630 people were awarded the Honorary Award of the President of Ukraine.

- 1992 - 14 persons.
- 1993 - 32 persons.
- 1994 - 131 persons.
- 1995 - 186 persons.
- 1996 - 267 persons.
