= Ukrainian Canadian Research and Documentation Centre =

Organisation documenting Ukrainian history

Coordinates: 43.66198°N 79.40216°W

The Ukrainian Canadian Research & Documentation Centre (UCRDC) (Ukrainian: Українсько-Канадський Дослідчо-Документаційний Центр; French: le Centre canadien ukrainien de recherche et de documentation) is a community center which collects, catalogs, and preserves material documenting the history, culture and contributions of Ukrainians throughout the world. UCRDC produces documentary films, such as the 2003 Between Hitler and Stalin, prepares educational materials, and sponsors lectures, conferences and exhibits on various topics related to Ukrainian issues. Between Hitler and Stalin: Ukraine in World War II The Untold Story, expands on the film, by notable scholars, Wsevolod W. Isajiw, Andrew Gregorovich and Oleh S. Romanyschyn, wherein Isajiw's introductory remarks at the film premiere stated that the "film touched on three main themes: (i)Ukraine was not a passive element in World War II and that among Ukrainians there was a widespread active element that strove to protect the Ukrainian people from both the Nazis and Soviets while fighting to gain independence for Ukraine;(ii) this struggle had roots in the past history of Ukraine and continued right up to independence in 1991;(iii) the devastation brought upon by World War II to Ukraine was unprecedented with millions of people killed, tens of thousands of villages destroyed, and numerous cities reduced to rubble."

UCRDC is a non-profit organization which seeks community support through various fundraising activities. The Center functions as a resource location which, according to its website, "holds an archive, a small library, oral histories (both in audio and video format), photographs, memoirs, personal archives and other miscellaneous items."

== Contact information ==
The UCRDC is located at 620 Spadina Avenue, Toronto, Ontario, Canada.
