= Ukrainian National Federation of Canada =

Canadian cultural and nonprofit organization

- Українське Національне Об'єднання
- Founded at: Edmonton, Alberta
- Merger of: Ukrainian War Veterans’ Association of Canada, the Organization of Ukrainian Women of Canada and the Ukrainian National Youth Federation of Canada
- Headquarters: Toronto, Ontario, Canada
- Official language: Ukrainian, English
- Website: unfcanada.ca

The Ukrainian National Federation of Canada (U.N.F., Ukrainian: Українське Національне Об'єднання) is a pan-Canadian cultural and non-for-profit organization of Ukrainian Canadians. Its headquarters are located Toronto, Ontario, Canada. The organization was created to help Ukrainian Canadians through the trials and tribulations afflicting the community in the aftermath of The Great Depression.

The Federation formed from a merger of three existing groups: the Ukrainian War Veterans’ Association of Canada, the Organization of Ukrainian Women of Canada and the Ukrainian National Youth Federation of Canada in 1932 with the first branches being inaugurated in Edmonton, Alberta and Saskatoon, Saskatchewan in 1932.

According to the Encyclopedia of Ukraine, the UNF was aligned with the Melnykite faction of the Organisation of Ukrainian Nationalists in the postwar period.

== History ==
In August 2022, Russia designated the Ukrainian National Federation of Canada as an "undesirable organisation".

== Controversies ==
In September 2023, Jurij Klufas, the president of the organization defended Yaroslav Hunka, a WWII veteran and a former Waffen-SS member who received standing ovations in the Parliament. He stated that there was nothing wrong with the Canadian Parliament applauding a man "who fought for his country", although acknowledging in the circumstances "this may not have been correct".

== Branches ==
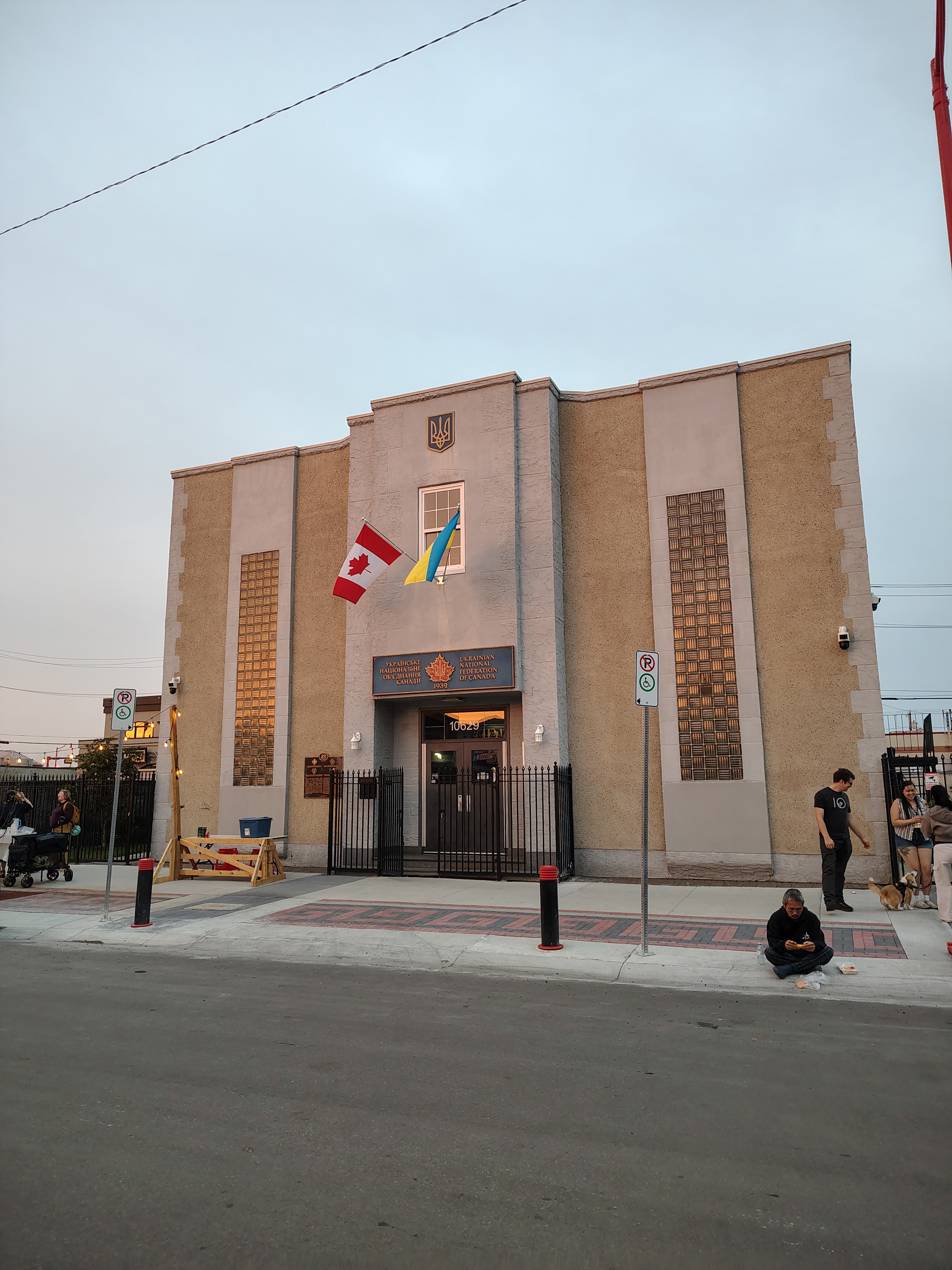
The Edmonton branch in 2026

The UNF has local branches in Ottawa, Montreal, Oshawa, Toronto (2), St. Catharines, Hamilton, Windsor, Sudbury, Winnipeg, Saskatoon, Regina, Edmonton and St. John's, a total of 12 branches in 5 provinces.

== See also ==
- List of Ukrainian Canadians
- List of Canadian place names of Ukrainian origin
