= Ukrainian American Coordinating Council =

- Українсько-Американська Координаційна Рада
- Formation: May 15, 1965; 61 years ago
- Type: Advocacy, pro-Ukraine, Cultural, Educational
- Legal status: 501(c)(3) nonprofit organization
- Headquarters: New York City, San Francisco, CA
- Locations: 142 Second Avenue, New York NY 10003; 345 Seventh Street, San Francisco CA 94103
- Official language: English, Ukrainian
- President: Ihor Gawdiak
- Affiliations: Ukrainian World Congress (UWC)
- Website: uaccusa.org

The Ukrainian American Coordinating Council (Ukrainian: Українсько-Американська Координаційна Рада) or UACC (Ukrainian: УАКРада) is a non-partisan not-for-profit national umbrella organization uniting Ukrainian American organizations in advocating for Ukrainian Americans. Council's focus is concentrated in the areas of Cultural Affairs, Business Affairs, Political Affairs and Humanitarian Aid. Its membership is composed of fraternal, educational, veterans, religious, cultural, social, business, political and humanitarian organizations, as well as individuals. Established in 1965, the UACC maintains local all-volunteer chapters across the United States, with a national office based in New York City, as well as a San Francisco, CA. The UACC is a member of the Ukrainian World Congress (UWC), the international assembly of nearly all Ukrainian public organizations in the worldwide Ukrainian diaspora of over 20 million people.

Today, it continues to embrace Ukrainian Historical, Political and Cultural heritage in the San Francisco Bay Area and California by sponsoring such events as concerts honoring Taras Shevchenko over the past 50 years, Ukrainian Independence Day in Golden Gate Park since 1964, the celebration of Ukraine’s Millennium baptism into Christianity, the Commemoration of the Soviet artificially induced famine of 1932-1933 in Ukraine called the Holodomor where up to ten million Ukrainians were victims as well as many other events and activities such as candlelight vigils, humanitarian aid for displaced citizens and soldiers, concerts, and the establishment and dedication of California Registered Historical Landmark No.1025 - Ukraine - honoring Ukrainian Patriot Reverend Father Agapius Honcharenko, fighter for freedom, democracy and human rights.

In Fall 2023, UACC members attended Ukraine Action Summit in Washington, DC.

== See also ==
- Ukraine–United States relations
- Senate Ukraine Caucus
- Ukrainian World Congress
- Ukrainian diaspora
- Ukrainian Americans
- Ukrainian Congress Committee of America
- The Federation of Ukrainian Student Organizations of America (SUSTA)
- Ukrainian National Women's League of America
- Ukrainian Catholic Archeparchy of Philadelphia
- Ukrainian Orthodox Church of the USA
- List of Ukrainian enclaves in North American cities
- Ukrainian Americans in New York City
- Ukrainian Americans in Los Angeles
- Ukrainian Village, Chicago
- Ukrainian Association of Washington State
- History of the Ukrainians in Baltimore
- Crimean Tatar diaspora
- Joint Baltic American National Committee
- Polish American Congress
- Belarusan-American Association
- Nova Ukraine
