= Congressional Ukraine Caucus =

- Overlay of the flags of the U.S. and Ukraine
- Co-Chairs: Marcy Kaptur (D-OH); Brian Fitzpatrick (R-PA); Joe Wilson (R-SC); Mike Quigley (D-IL)
- Co-Founders: Marcy Kaptur (D-OH); Sander Levin (D-MI); Louise Slaughter (D-NY); Jon Fox (R-PA); Bob Schaffer (R-CO)
- Founded: June 30, 1997
- Headquarters: Washington, D.C.
- Seats in the House: 100 / 435

The Congressional Ukraine Caucus is a bipartisan caucus of the United States House of Representatives that was announced in June 1997 in Washington, D.C., nearly six years after Ukraine declared its independence.

Its mission is "organize an association of Members of Congress who share a common concern for building stronger bilateral relations between Ukraine and the United States." With the cooperation with the Ukrainian American community, the Caucus serves to lend support for Ukraine, beginning with democratization efforts and market-oriented reforms, and functions as a source of information for Members of Congress regarding events in Ukraine.

Its counterpart in the United States Senate is the Senate Ukraine Caucus, which was established in February 2015.

== Members ==
Since its inception, the Congressional Ukraine Caucus has been composed of members of both the Democratic and Republican Parties.

=== Leadership ===
- Marcy Kaptur (D-OH)
- Brian Fitzpatrick (R-PA)
- Mike Quigley (D-IL)
- Joe Wilson (R-SC)

=== Members ===
- Rep. Gabe Amo (D-RI)
- Rep. Jake Auchincloss (D-MA)
- Rep. Wesley Bell (D-MO)
- Rep. Ami Bera (D-CA)
- Rep. Gus Bilirakis (R-FL)
- Rep. Brendan Boyle (D-PA)
- Rep. Julia Brownley (D-CA)
- Rep. Vern Buchanan (R-FL)
- Rep. Nikki Budzinski (D-IL)
- Rep. Kat Cammack (R-FL)
- Rep. André Carson (D-IN)
- Rep. Ed Case (D-HI)
- Rep. Sean Casten (D-IL)
- Rep. Gil Cisneros (D-CA)
- Rep. Steve Cohen (D-TN)
- Rep. Jim Costa (D-CA)
- Rep. Joe Courtney (D-CT)
- Rep. Jasmine Crockett (D-TX)
- Rep. Jason Crow (D-CO)
- Rep. Danny Davis (D-IL)
- Rep. Madeleine Dean (D-PA)
- Rep. Rosa DeLauro (D-CT)
- Rep. Suzan DelBene (D-WA)
- Rep. Debbie Dingell (D-MI)
- Rep. Lloyd Doggett (D-TX)
- Rep. Chuck Edwards (R-NC)
- Rep. Adriano Espaillat (D-NY)
- Rep. Dwight Evans (D-PA)
- Rep. Mike Flood (R-NE)
- Rep. John Garamendi (D-CA)
- Rep. Marie Gluesenkamp-Perez (D-WA)
- Rep. Dan Goldman (D-NY)
- Rep. Josh Gottheimer (D-NJ)
- Rep. Andy Harris (R-MD)
- Rep. French Hill (R-AR)
- Rep. Jim Himes (D-CT)
- Del. Eleanor Holmes-Norton (D-DC)
- Rep. Steven Horsford (D-NV)
- Rep. Steny Hoyer (D-MD)
- Rep. Val Hoyle (D-OR)
- Rep. Ronny Jackson (R-TX)
- Rep. Hakeem Jeffries (D-NY)
- Rep. Julie Johnson (D-TX)
- Rep. David Joyce (R-OH)
- Rep. Sydney Kamlager-Dove (D-CA)
- Rep. Tom Kean (R-NJ)
- Rep. William Keating (D-MA)
- Rep. Tim Kennedy (D-NY)
- Rep. Raja Krishnamoorthi (D-IL)
- Rep. Greg Landsman (D-OH)
- Rep. Rick Larsen (D-WA)
- Rep. John Larson (D-CT)
- Rep. Mike Lawler (R-NY)
- Rep. Ted Lieu (D-CA)
- Rep. Seth Magaziner (D-RI)
- Rep. Nicole Malliotakis (R-NY)
- Rep. Michael McCaul (R-TX)
- Rep. Jennifer McClellan (D-VA)
- Rep. Rob Menendez (D-NJ)
- Rep. Dan Meuser (R-PA)
- Rep. Kweisi Mfume (D-MD)
- Rep. Mariannette Miller-Meeks (R-IA)
- Rep. Joe Morelle (D-NY)
- Rep. Jared Moskowitz (D-FL)
- Rep. Seth Moulton (D-MA)
- Rep. Johnny Olszewski (D-MD)
- Rep. Frank Pallone (D-NJ)
- Rep. Nancy Pelosi (D-CA)
- Rep. August Pfluger (R-TX)
- Rep. Dean Phillips (D-MN)
- Rep. Chellie Pingree (D-ME)
- Rep. Nellie Pou (D-NJ)
- Rep. Delia Ramirez (D-IL)
- Rep. Emily Randall (D-WA)
- Rep. Jamie Raskin (D-MD)
- Rep. Deborah Ross (D-NC)
- Rep. Mary Gay Scanlon (D-PA)
- Rep. Jan Schakowsky (D-IL)
- Rep. Brad Schneider (D-IL)
- Rep. Bobby Scott (D-VA)
- Rep. Brad Sherman (D-CA)
- Rep. Adam Smith (D-WA)
- Rep. Chris Smith (R-NJ)
- Rep. Victoria Spartz (R-IN)
- Rep. Haley Stevens (D-MI)
- Rep. Tom Suozzi (D-NY)
- Rep. Eric Swalwell (D-CA)
- Rep. Dina Titus (D-NV)
- Rep. Jill Tokuda (D-HI)
- Rep. Ritchie Torres (D-NY)
- Rep. Lori Trahan (D-MA)
- Rep. Eugene Vindman (D-VA)
- Rep. Debbie Wasserman Schultz (D-FL)
- Rep. Bonnie Watson Coleman (D-NJ)
- Rep. Steve Womack (R-AR)

== Relevant legislation ==
Leaders and members of the Congressional Ukrainian Caucus have worked in the past toward the passing of legislation regarding Ukraine and issues that affect the surrounding region and its constituency in America. These efforts include, but are not limited to:

114th Congress:

- H.Res.50 Calling for the release of Ukrainian fighter pilot Nadiya Savchenko, who was captured by Russian forces in Eastern Ukraine and has been held illegally in a Russian prison since July 2014
- H.Res.162 Calling on the President to provide Ukraine with military assistance to defend its sovereignty and territorial integrity
- H.Res.348 Supporting the right of the people of Ukraine to freely elect their government and determine their future
- H.Res.878 Recognizing the 25th anniversary of Ukraine's act of declaration of independence from the Soviet Union
- H.R.5094 Stability and Democracy for Ukraine Act or the STAND for Ukraine Act

113th Congress:

- H.Res.447 Supporting the democratic and European aspirations of the people of Ukraine, and their right to choose their own future free of intimidation and fear
- H.Res.499 Condemning the violation of Ukrainian sovereignty, independence, and territorial integrity by military forces of the Russian Federation
- H.Res.726 Strongly supporting the right of the people of Ukraine to freely determine their future, including their country's relationship with other nations and international organizations, without interference, intimidation, or coercion by other countries
- H.Res.758 Strongly condemning the actions of the Russian Federation, under President Vladimir Putin, which has carried out a policy of aggression against neighboring countries aimed at political and economic domination
- H.R.4152 Support for the Sovereignty, Integrity, Democracy, and Economic Stability of Ukraine Act of 2014
- H.R.5859 Ukraine Freedom Support Act of 2014

== See also ==
- History of Ukraine
- House Baltic Caucus
- Senate Ukraine Caucus
- Ukrainian Congress Committee of America
