= Tatiana Tairova-Yakovleva =

Scientist, historian (1967)

Professor Tatiana Tairova-Yakovleva
- Татьяна Геннадьевна Таирова-Яковлева
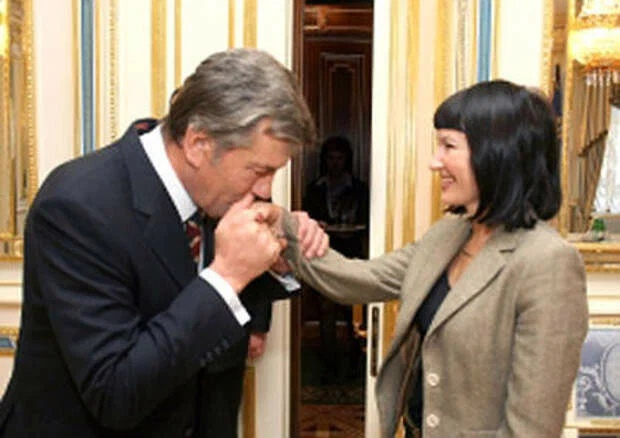
- President of Ukraine Viktor Yushchenko (left) awards Tatiana Tairova-Yakovleva the Order of Princess Olga, Third Class in 2008.
- Born: 5 May 1967 (age 59); Leningrad, Soviet Union
- Citizenship: Russian
- Occupations: Academic, professor, historian
- Known for: Founder and director (2004–2022) of the Centre of Ukrainian Studies (Institute of History, Saint Petersburg State University)
- Title: Doctor of Historical Sciences, Professor

Academic background
- Education: Leningrad State University, Canadian Institute of Ukrainian Studies, Harvard Ukrainian Research Institute, Institute of History of Ukraine
- Alma mater: Leningrad State University, University of Alberta, Harvard University, National Academy of Sciences of Ukraine
- Academic advisors: Omeljan Pritsak, George Gajecky

Academic work
- Era: 20th–21st century
- Discipline: Cossack Ukraine studies
- Institutions: Saint Petersburg State University, Harvard University, Russian Academy of Sciences, National Academy of Sciences of Ukraine
- Main interests: Political, social and economic history of Ukraine in the 16th–18th centuries; biographies of leading figures of the Ukrainian Cossack state, its international situation and foreign policy
- Notable works: Mazepa (2007)

Tatiana Gennadievna Tairova-Yakovleva (Note: Russian: Татьяна Геннадьевна Таирова-Яковлева, romanized: Tatiana Gennadievna Tairova-Yakovleva. Ukrainian: Тетяна Геннадіївна Таїрова-Яковлева, romanized: Tetjana Hennadijivna Tajirova-Jakovleva. In English-language publications, she spells her own name as Tatiana Tairova-Yakovleva.) (née Yakovleva), (born 5 May 1967, Leningrad) is a scientist, historian, Doctor of Historical Sciences, and professor born and educated in Soviet Russia, in the 1990s completing her studies in the United States, Canada, and Ukraine. She specialises in the history of early modern Central and Eastern Europe and Ukraine. She researches the political, social and economic history of Ukraine in the 16th–18th centuries, as well as biographies of leading figures of the Ukrainian Cossack state, its international situation and foreign policy.

She was the founder and director (from 2004 to 2022) of the Centre for Ukrainian Studies at the Institute of History of Saint Petersburg State University. She is a member of the Scientific Council of the Ukrainian Historical Journal (Ukraine), the East/West: Journal of Ukrainian Studies (Canada), and was a member of the scientific council of the journal Studia Slavica et Balkanica Petropolitana (Russia).

In June 2022, she was dismissed from Saint Petersburg State University for speaking out against the February 2022 full-scale Russian invasion of Ukraine. She has since been in political exile.

== Biography ==
On her mother's side, the researcher comes from an old Polish noble family; her grandmother was Tatiana Zhudra before her marriage.

She was born into a family of an art historian and an athlete. After retiring from sports, her father became the head of the physical education department at one of Leningrad's universities and the director of the Petrovsky Stadium, which from 1994 until 2017 was the home arena of the Zenit football club.

== Scholarly and educational activities ==
=== Education and early career ===
From 1984 to 1989, Yakovleva studied at the History Department of Leningrad State University (LSU). The supervisor of her course projects, which in her first three years were devoted to the figure of Cossack colonel Ivan Bohun, and her thesis, which dealt with the figure of hetman Ivan Vyhovsky, was professor Yuri Davidovich Margolis (LSU), Doctor of Historical Sciences.

In 1990–1991, she studied in the postgraduate school of the Canadian Institute of Ukrainian Studies (CIUS) University of Alberta in Edmonton, Alberta, Canada. Next, she interned at Harvard Ukrainian Research Institute. Among the lecturers were such Ukrainian studies scholars as Omeljan Pritsak, Fedir Shevchenko, Mykola Kovalsky, and George Gajecky.

In 1992, she was expelled from the postgraduate programme at Saint Petersburg State University (the renamed LSU) for "Ukrainian nationalism". Her opponents at St. Petersburg State University called her dissertation "Kostomarovism (костомаровщина), "support for the People's Movement of Ukraine (RUKH)" and "Ukrainian bourgeois nationalism". On 29 April 1994, she defended her doctoral thesis at the Institute of History of Ukraine of the National Academy of Sciences of Ukraine, titled The initial stage of the Ruin: the socio-political situation and foreign policy of Ukraine in the late 1650s. (Note: «Початковий етап Руїни: соціально-політичне становище та зовнішня політика України кінця 50-х років XVII ст.».) The scientific supervisor was Margolis, her teacher at LSU in the 1980s.

Nevertheless, ten years later on 19 May 2004, she defended her doctoral dissertation on Social and Political Struggles in Ukraine in the 1660s: Internal and External Factors of the Ruin at St. Petersburg State University in St. Petersburg. The scientific opponents (reviewers) were Boris Florya, Alexander Turgayev, and Andrey Pavlov.

=== Centre for Ukrainian Studies ===
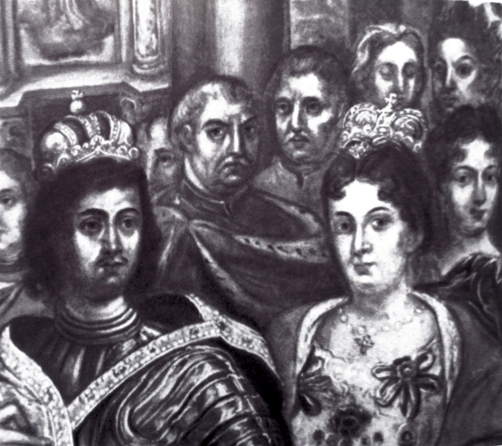
Icon depicting Peter I, Catherine Alexeyevna and Ivan Mazepa. Illustration in Tairova-Yakovleva's 2007 book Mazepa.

Since 2003, Tairova-Yakovleva worked at Saint Petersburg State University in the Department of History of Slavic and Balkan Countries, founding the Centre for Ukrainian Studies in 2004. Also in 2004, she discovered and subsequently published the so-called "Baturyn Archive" (or "Baturyn Library"), which was a significant event for the world of Ukrainian studies, as it revealed a large number of previously unknown historical documents, and presented the structure and content of the hetman archives for the first time. Since 2011, she also worked in the newly established Department of History of the Peoples of the CIS Countries. In 2008, 2013, and 2018, she lectured at the Harvard Ukrainian Research Institute (HURI) in the United States. In 2016 and 2019, the researcher was nominated for the title of corresponding member of the Russian Academy of Sciences. She was a member of the Academic Council of the Institute of History of Saint Petersburg State University, an expert at the Russian State Science Foundation, and an expert at the Russian Academy of Sciences. She is a member of the Russian-Ukrainian and Russian-Lithuanian commissions of historians.

Tairova-Yakovleva was the director of the joint publication of the Centre for Ukrainian Studies on documents from the archives of Ivan Mazepa, stored in St. Petersburg (the project was funded by Kowalsky Program for the Study of Eastern Ukraine). Under her leadership, the Centre published sources on Ukrainian history stored in the archives of St. Petersburg and Moscow. In 2020, she completed a joint project with the Institute of History of the National Academy of Sciences of Ukraine to publish the Samiilo Velychko Chronicle. Frank Sysyn praised her for this accomplishment in 2021: "Tatiana Tairova-Yakovleva and her colleagues have finally given us the academic edition of Velychko that we have needed."

=== Since 2022 ===
On 18 January 2022, Tairova-Yakovleva participated in a round table discussion organised by the Russian Historical Society and chaired by Sergey Naryshkin, Director of the Foreign Intelligence Service of the Russian Federation. which was devoted to the study of Ukrainian history and linked to the 368th anniversary of the 1654 Pereiaslav Agreement.

On 24 February 2022, she was one of the first to condemn Russia's full-scale invasion of Ukraine. On 27 February, she signed a collective anti-war appeal by Russian intellectuals. In a video message, she strongly condemned the Russian invasion and Russia's policies. She expressed regret that she is a Russian citizen.

"Dear colleagues. Dear friends. In these tragic times, I want to address you. For me, what is happening is a huge personal tragedy. And not only because I have been researching the history of Ukraine for the last 30 years and have many, many friends in different cities of Ukraine. From Lviv to Poltava, Kharkiv and others. But also because I am very ashamed that I am Russian. I am very ashamed of my homeland. We used to be very happy with Sobchak and Yeltsin's Russia, a democratic Russia. When we first raised the tricolour, we truly dreamed that it would be a new, democratic Russia. How did it happen that imperial dreams and what Lenin once called "great power chauvinism" transformed into fascism? We will discuss this a lot, we will write many books about it. Later. In the future. After victory. After your victory. I have no doubt that everything will be very good with Ukraine. That it will be a huge, powerful European state. (...) As for Russia's future, everything is much more tragic. (...) But all Russians are to blame. And above all, journalists. Incidentally, the hundreds of thousands, millions of Ukrainians living in Russia who remain silent are also to blame. For example, Ukrainian celebrities. All world historians who studied the Slavic world and supported Russia's imperial ambitions are also to blame. But let me return to Ukraine. And I am sure that everything will be fine. That you will win. That the Cossack spirit lives on. Slava Ukraini! See you soon."

In June 2022, Tairova-Yakovleva was dismissed from her position of professor of Ukrainian History and Director of the Centre for Ukrainian Studies due to her vocal opposition to the Russian invasion of Ukraine. Following her dismissal, she was a research fellow supported by the Gerda Henkel Stiftung in Germany from 2022 to 2024.

Tairova-Yakovleva's field of scientific interests concerns the history of Ukraine in the 16th–18th centuries. At the same time, the researcher has a number of publications related to the history of Belarus and Lithuania in the early modern period, as well as Ukrainian history in the 19th–20th centuries. She lectures on the following subjects: "History of Ukraine and Belarus", "Source Studies of the History of Ukraine and Belarus," "Historiography of the History of Ukraine," as well as a special course on "Cossack Ukraine in Cultural Works."

As of 2026, she has published over 150 scientific works, including nine monographs and one joint monograph. Five monographs have been published in foreign languages. Under the editorship of Tairova-Yakovleva, 3 volumes of documents on the history of Eastern Europe were published. Her works have been published in Ukraine, Italy, Austria, Canada, the USA, Hungary, Poland, and Russia.

== Awards ==
- Third Class of the Order of Princess Olga. For her most significant scientific work, the publication of the book Mazepa (2007), professor Tatiana Tairova-Yakovleva was awarded the Order of Princess Olga, Third Class, in 2008. The award was presented personally by President of Ukraine Viktor Yushchenko.
- In 2007, she had already been granted the Honorary title of Ukraine "Guardian of the Ukrainian Cossacks" (Берегиня Українського козацтва) for preparing and publishing the book Mazepa.

== Bibliography ==
By November 2024, Tairova-Yakovleva had written 16 books, and approximately 140 scholarly articles.

=== Monographs ===
- Гетьманщина в другій половині 50-х років XVII століття: причини і початок Руїни. Kyiv: Osnovy. 1998. p. 447. ISBN 966-500-041-1.
- Руїна Гетьманщини: Від Переяславської ради—2 до Андрусівської угоди (1659–1667 рр.) (PDF). Kyiv: Osnovy. 2003. p. 644. ISBN 966-500-099-3.
- Tairova-Yakovleva, Tatiana (2007). Мазепа [Mazepa] (in Russian). Moscow: Molodaâ gvardiâ. p. 269. ISBN 978-5-235-02966-8.
- Иван Мазепа и Российская империя. История «предательства». [Ivan Mazepa and the Russian Empire. History of the "Betrayal"]. Moscow: Centrpoligraf, 2011.
- Tairova-Yakovleva, Tatiana (2020). Ivan Mazepa and the Russian Empire (PDF). Montreal Kingston London Chicago: McGill-Queen's Press. p. 425. ISBN 978-0-2280-0309-0.
- Гетманы Украины. История о славе, трагедиях и мужестве. — Moscow: Изд-во Центрполиграф, 2011
- Іван Мазепа і Російська імперія. Історія «зради». Kyiv: Кліо, 2012, 403 с. (Перевидання книги видавництвом «Кліо» мало місце у 2015, 2017)
- Гетьмани України. Історії про славу, трагедії та мужність / Переклад з рос. Наталії Єгоровець. — Kyiv: Кліо, 2015.
- Повседневная жизнь, досуг и традиции казацкой элиты украинского гетманства. — Saint Petersburg: Алетейя, 2016.
- Повсякдення дозвілля і традиції козацької еліти Гетьманщини / Переклад з рос. Тетяни Кришталовської. — Kyiv: Кліо, 2017.
- Инкорпорация: Россия и Украина после Переяславской рады (1654—1658). — Kyiv: Кліо, 2017.
- Іван Мазепа / Переклад з рос. Ю. А. Мицик, І. Ю. Тарасенко. — Kharkiv: Фоліо, 2018.
- Коліївщина: великі ілюзії / Переклад з рос. Тетяни Кришталовської. — Kyiv: Кліо, 2019.

=== Scientific editing and publication of documents (selection) ===
- Украина и соседние государства в XVII веке. Материалы международной конференции / Отв. ред. д. и. н. Т. Г. Яковлева. — Saint Petersburg: Изд-во «Скиф», 2004.
- Гетман Иван Мазепа: Документы из архивных собраний Санкт-Петербурга. В 2 вып. Вып 1. 1687—1705 гг. / Сост. Т. Г. Таирова-Яковлева. — Saint Petersburg, Изд-во С-Петер. ун-та, 2007.
- Малороссийский приказ. Описи фонда № 229 Российского государственного архива древних актов / Отв. ред. Т. Г. Таирова-Яковлева. — Moscow: Древлехранилище, 2012.
- Батуринский архив и другие документы по истории Украинского гетманства 1690—1709 гг. / рук. проекта и сост. д-р. ист. наук Т. Г. Яковлева; отв. ред. канд. ист. наук Т. А. Базарова. — Saint Petersburg: Дмитрий Буланин, 2014.
- Малороссийский приказ. Описи фонда № 124 Российского государственного архива древних актов / Отв. ред. Т. Г. Таирова-Яковлева. — Moscow: Древлехранилище, 2016.

=== Articles (selection) ===
- Tairova-Yakovleva, Tatiana (2018). "Elite women in the Ukrainian Hetmanate". Canadian Slavonic Papers / Revue Canadienne des Slavistes. 60 (1/2). Taylor & Francis, Ltd.: 26–43. ISSN 0008-5006. JSTOR 26774517.
- Tairova-Yakovleva, Tatiana (2015). "Studying the Early Modern Period and Teaching Ukrainian History in Russia". Harvard Ukrainian Studies. 34 (1/4). Harvard Ukrainian Research Institute: 485–491. ISSN 0363-5570. JSTOR 44364504.
- Гетманщина и ее инкорпорация в Российскую империю // Западные окраины Российской империи. Moscow, 2006. С. 33-54. (Гетьманщина та її інкорпорація у Російську імперію / / Західні окраїни Російської імперії. Moscow, 2006. С. 33–54.);
- Донос старшини на І.Самойловича: аналіз першоджерела // УІЖ. — 2006. — № 4. — С. 190—201;
- Іван Богун-Федорович.// Київська Старовина. Kyiv, 1992, № 5. С. 43–53;
- Мазепа-гетман: в поисках исторической объективности // Новое и Новейшее время. 2003, № 4., июль-август. С. 45–63. (Мазепа-гетьман: у пошуках історичної об'єктивності / / Новий і Новітній час. 2003, № 4., Липень-серпень. С. 45–63.);
- Проблемы взаимоотношений Украины и России 1654—1667 гг. // Белоруссия и Украина. История и культура. Мoscow, 2003. С. 41–48. (Проблеми взаємовідносин України та Росії 1654–1667 рр. / / Білорусь та Україна. Історія і культура. Moscow, 2003.С. 41–48.);
- Проблемы неоднородности украинского казачества и внутренние противоречия их идеалов. Войско Запорожское и Запорожье // Украина и соседние государства в XVII веке. Saint Petersburg, 2004. С. 203—214 (Проблеми неоднорідності українського козацтва та внутрішні суперечності їх ідеалів. Військо Запорозьке і Запоріжжя / / Україна і сусідні держави в XVII столітті. Saint Petersburg, 2004. С. 203—214).

== Sources ==
- Tairova-Yakovleva, Tatiana (2021). "The Chronicle of Samiilo Velychko: Toward a New Academic Edition". Harvard Ukrainian Studies. 38 (3/4). Harvard Ukrainian Research Institute: 175–192. ISSN 0363-5570. JSTOR 48733658.
- Yevhen Kazimirovych Nakhlik, Поспіх на шкоду науковості // Zbruč. 1 July 2021.
- Taras Chukhlib. Таїрова-Яковлева Тетяна Геннадіївна Encyclopedia of History of Ukraine.
- Поддержка Великих очень многое значит для молодого историка / Владислав Яценко — інтерв'ю з Тетяною Таїровою-Яковлевою // Historians.in.ua, 12 September 2013.
- Было очень сложно найти тех, кто вообще не убегал в ужасе при словосочетании «История Украины» / Владислав Яценко — інтерв'ю з Тетяною Таїровою-Яковлевою // Historians.in.ua, 3 March 2016. (in Russian)
- Владислав Яценко «… Было очень сложно найти тех, кто вообще не убегал в ужасе при словосочетании „История Украины“» Интервью с Татьяною Таировою-Яковлевой // Ab Imperio. Исследования по новой имперской истории и национализму в постсоветском пространстве. — 2016. — № 3. — pp. 311—318. (in Russian)
- Коліївщина відкрила шлях до ліквідації Запорізької Січі й російського завоювання Криму, — історик Тетяна Таїрова-Яковлєва / Ольга Скороход, Цензор.нет, 17 November 2019.
