= AACT =

AACT may refer to:

- Academy of Arts, Careers and Technology, a career-tech high school in Reno, Nevada
- Aggregate Analysis of ClinicalTrials.gov, a database of clinical trials data; see Data sources section
- Alpha 1-antichymotrypsin, a protein
- American Academy of Clinical Toxicology
- American Association of Crimean Turks, Inc
