= Organization for Defense of Four Freedoms for Ukraine =

U.S. nonprofit of Ukrainian diaspora

- Організація оборони чотирьох свобід України
- Formation: June 15, 1946; 80 years ago
- Type: 501c3 foundation whose mission is the democratic development of Ukraine
- Tax ID no.: 13-5645886
- Legal status: 501(c)(3) nonprofit organization
- Headquarters: New York City
- President: Yurij Wowczuk
- Website: ODFFU — Organization for the Defense of Four Freedoms for Ukraine

The Organization for Defense of Four Freedoms for Ukraine (Ukrainian: Організація оборони чотирьох свобід України) or ODFFU (Ukrainian: ООЧСУ) is a national member-based organization founded at a gathering of Ukrainian immigrants in New York City on June 15, 1946, uniting the efforts of Ukrainian nationalists who began similar initiatives in both that city and Newark, New Jersey earlier that year. The newly elected steering committee issued a public appeal "To the Ukrainian Citizenship in America" calling on prospective members to commit to the following:

- To defend the Four Freedoms and the principles set forth in the Atlantic Charter, and applying them to Ukraine;
- To inform non-Ukrainians about Ukrainian affairs through printed material and other means;
- To acquaint Ukrainian Americans with the current situation in Ukraine and its struggle for independence;
- To render moral and material assistance to the liberation struggle of Ukrainians in their native lands towards the goal of establishing a united, independent Ukrainian nation-state

Today's ODFFU aims to unite the Ukrainian diaspora in America, and to act in the interests of Ukraine and Ukrainians throughout the world in general, through political, cultural, educational, and sports initiatives.

== Ideology of the ODFFU ==
The name and the ideology of ODFFU is based upon President Franklin D. Roosevelt's Four Freedoms speech, the State of the Union address delivered to a joint session of the United States Congress on January 25, 1941. This speech formed the basis of a strategic partnership between the United States and Great Britain that became embodied in a declaration known as the Atlantic Charter.

The Four Freedoms are:

- Freedom of Speech and Expression - This idea represents not only the rights of individuals, but also the rights of a free nation to freely formulate its ideas and development.
- Freedom of Conscience - This cannot exist while one is under any type of physical occupation. Freedom of Conscience only exists when one embodies a belief in God and freedom of religion.
- Freedom from Fear - Individuals must have the right to freely develop their political, social, cultural and economic institutions, which they feel will benefit their nation.
- Freedom from Want - This can only be achieved by having a government that provides opportunities for people to have access to the means of development and growth economically.

== Early history ==
The first two branches of the Organization for Defense of Four Freedoms for Ukraine were formed almost simultaneously in the spring of 1946 in Newark, NJ, and New York City. Within these Ukrainian diaspora communities, founding ODFFU president Eugene Lachowitch, an engineer by training and a passionate proponent of the Ukrainian nation's right to independence from the Soviet Union, had for several years fundraised and advocated on behalf of local ad-hoc committees of assistance to the UPA, in support the struggle for a free and independent Ukraine. On June 15, 1946, a ODFFU Steering Committee was elected in New York under the chairmanship of Lachowitch, until such time as a organizational convention could be organized. The steering committee further met in New York City on October 27, 1946, to move forward the process of calling for a national convention for supporters of Ukraine's national liberation, especially in a response to the Third American Slav Congress which convened in New York City on September 20-22, 1946. With 2,000 supporters of the USSR gathering at the Manhattan Center and Madison Square Garden, standing in ovation to personal messages "from Generalissimo Stalin, Marshal Tito, and Bulgarian Communist Georgi Dimitroff," ODFFU leaders were moved to amplify the voices of supporters of Ukraine within the political discussion of the United States.

"We believe that the greatest benefit for the liberation struggle of Ukraine can be realized outside its borders only when our political centers base their work on the needs of the Land, and when people authorized by the Land speak on behalf of Ukraine."

— ODFFU Steering Committee, 1947

The First ODFFU National Convention was held in New York City on August 31, 1947, at the Belvedere Hotel, and elected Eugene Lachowitch as the organizations founding president. The Second, Third and Fourth conventions convened at the Brevoort House hotel in New York City in the years 1948, 1949 and 1950, electing Ihnat Bilynsky for multiple terms. The Fifth (1951) and Sixth (1953) conventions convened at Beethoven Hall in Manhattan's East Village, near Little Ukraine, electing Ivan Wowczuk for the first of many terms at the latter.

"This Convention welcomes all peoples fighting against the communist-Moscow despotism and wishes them success in the struggle for freedom. However, it most resolutely condemns all political greed and imperialism."

— Resolution Committee, Second Annual ODFFU Convention, 1948

Additional ODFFU presidents include Eugene Lozynskyj (1961-65), Ivan Vynnyk (1965-71), Lev Futala (1980-83), Nicholas Chirovsky (1983-89), Eugene Hanowsky (1989-96), Bohdan Fedorak (1996-2002), Theodore Oleschuk (2002-2005), Michael Koziupa (2005-2011), Esteban Kaczurak (2011-2019), Mykola Hryckowian (2019-2026) and Yurij Wowczuk (2026-present).

Throughout the years of its existence, ODFFU grew from a small group of dedicated individuals to a large national organization with over 57 branches located in the most populated cities of the United States.

== WADFFU ==
As early as 1966, local chapters of ODFFU women's auxiliaries were formed in Pennsylvania. The following year, the Women’s Association for the Defense of Four Freedoms for Ukraine (uk:Об'єднання Жінок Оборони Чотирьох Свобід України) or WADFFU (ОЖ-ОЧСУ) held its first national convention in New York City, and immediately joined ODDFU as a member organization of the Ukrainian Congress Committee of America and the World Federation of Ukrainian Women's Organizations, and participated in the founding convention of the Ukrainian World Congress that same year.
