= Ukrainian Congress Committee of America =

Umbrella organization uniting Ukrainian American diaspora associations founded in 1940

- Український Конґресовий Комітет Америки
- Formation: May 24, 1940; 86 years ago
- Type: Advocacy, pro-Ukraine, Cultural, Educational
- Tax ID no.: 13-6219868
- Legal status: 501(c)(3) nonprofit organization
- Headquarters: New York City
- President: Michael Sawkiw, Jr.
- Vice president: Marta Liscynesky Kelleher
- National Council Chair: Roman Hirniak
- Website: ucca.org

The Ukrainian Congress Committee of America (Ukrainian: Український Конґресовий Комітет Америки) or UCCA (Ukrainian: УККА) is a non-partisan non-profit national umbrella organization uniting 30 national Ukrainian American organizations in advocating for over 1,000,000 Americans of Ukrainian descent. Its membership is composed of fraternal, educational, veterans, religious, cultural, social, business, political and humanitarian organizations, as well as individuals. Established in 1940, UCCA maintains local volunteer chapters across the United States, with a national office based in New York City, as well as a Washington, D.C., news bureau, the Ukrainian National Information Service. The humanitarian aid committee, the United Ukrainian American Relief Committee, is headquartered in Philadelphia, Pennsylvania.

UCCA is a founding member of the Ukrainian World Congress (UWC), the international assembly of nearly all Ukrainian public organizations in the worldwide Ukrainian diaspora of over 20 million people. In the United States, UCCA is a member organization of the Central and East European Coalition (CEEC), which coordinates the efforts of national ethnic organizations representing 20 million Americans, whose members continue to maintain strong cultural, economic, political, and religious ties to the countries of Central and East Europe.

UCCA convenes a "Congress of Ukrainians in America" quadrennially (from 1940 to 1969, triennially), composed of delegates representing registered national organizations, UCCA member organizations and local UCCA chapters. The most recent Congress convened in the North Penn Valley region of Pennsylvania in October 2025.

== Organizational structure ==
During the periods between each quadrennial Congress of Ukrainians in America, elected committees carry out the directives of the previous Congress under the guidance of a National Executive Board, appointed at the previous Congress. The National Executive Board, in turn, executes the plans and directives of UCCA's National Council, the highest ruling body of the UCCA.

UCCA's National Council meets biannually, and is composed of delegates representing Ukrainian churches and religious associations, Ukrainian educational institutions, national or central member organizations, and local UCCA chapters.

Current member organizations of the National Council include:

- Center for US-Ukrainian Relations (CUSUR)
- Council on Aid to Ukrainians (RODU)
- Educational Council of UCCA
- Federation of Ukrainian Student Organizations of America (SUSTA)
- Heritage Foundation Of First Security Federal Savings Bank ("Спадщина")
- Manor College
- New Ukrainian Wave
- Organization for Defense of Four Freedoms for Ukraine (ODFFU)
- Organization for Defense of Lemkivshchyna (OOL)
- Organization for the Rebirth of Ukraine (ODWU)
- Plast Ukrainian Scouting Organization – USA
- Providence Association of Ukrainian Catholics in America
- "Self-Reliance" Association of American Ukrainians ("Самопоміч")
- Society of the Ukrainian Insurgent Army (UPA)
- The Ukrainian Quarterly
- Ukrainian American Bar Association (UABA)
- Ukrainian American Freedom Foundation (UAFF)
- Ukrainian American Veterans (UAV)
- Ukrainian American Youth Association (UAYA/SUMA/CYM)
- Ukrainian Catholic Metropolitan of Philadelphia
- Ukrainian Free University Foundation
- Ukrainian Human Rights Committee
- Ukrainian Medical Association of North America (UMANA/УЛТПА)
- Ukrainian National Association (UNA)
- Ukrainian National Credit Union Association (UNCUA/ЦУКА)
- Ukrainian National Information Service (UNIS)
- Ukrainian Orthodox Church of the USA
- United Ukrainian American Relief Committee (UUARC)
- Women's Association for the Defense of Four Freedoms for Ukraine

Local chapters are spread over the United States, with the most active in the following cities: Atlanta, GA, Binghamton, NY, Boston, MA, Buffalo, NY, Charlotte, NC, Chicago, IL, Cleveland, OH, Hartford, CT, Honolulu, HI, Long Island, NY, New York City, North Port, FL, Passaic, NJ, Philadelphia, PA, Riverhead, NY, Syracuse, NY, and Yonkers, NY.

=== United Ukrainian American Relief Committee ===
The United Ukrainian American Relief Committee (UUARC) was established at the Second Congress of Americans of Ukrainian Descent in 1944. Organized to coordinate humanitarian aid for Ukrainian war victims and refugees, its mandate also focuses on educational and sustainable land programs overseas, and immigrant assistance programs in the U.S. The UUARC is headquartered in Philadelphia, PA.

=== Educational Council of UCCA ===
The Educational Council of UCCA was founded in 1953 to centralize and coordinate the activities of dozens of Saturday School Programs of Ukrainian Studies which had already existed in the United States since the start of the 20th century. The council is responsible for regularly organizing teachers’ workshops, publishing and distributing textbooks, as well as regularly checking in with the state of Schools of Ukrainian across the United States.

=== Ukrainian National Information Service ===
The Ukrainian National Information Service (UNIS) is the UCCA's permanent Washington, D.C.-based bureau. Founded in 1977 to strengthen the work of the Ukrainian American community in American governmental circles, UNIS originally operated out of offices leased from The Heritage Foundation prior to the purchase of a permanent home in 2000. When engaged with members of the United States Congress, the UNIS cooperates with the Congressional Ukrainian Caucus and the Senate Ukraine Caucus.

== Formation and gatherings ==
Prior to the gathering of the "First Ukrainian American Congress" which established the Ukrainian Congress Committee of America on May 24, 1940, there were numerous attempts by pre-war émigrés from Ukraine to unite. The first convention of the Ukrainian National Association (UNA) in 1894, which attracted 17 delegates from among the nearly 10,000 "Rusyn-Ukrainian" Greek Catholic immigrants in Eastern Pennsylvania, is often referred to as a seminal formative event. Following the Russian Imperial forces marching into Lviv during the early stages of World War I in August 1914, a Ukrainian People's Rada (Українська народна рада) was established in New York City on September 10, 1914, by several local Ukrainian American associations, with the goal of fundraising under the banner of a "War Fund for the Native Land" (Боєвий Фонд Рідного Краю {sic}), and led to voices calling for a distinct Ukrainian republic to be featured in Ukrainian American publications. Bishop Soter Ortynsky, among the most influential Ukrainian religious leaders in the United States, convened a similar gathering of mostly Greek-Catholic clerics and lay leaders on December 8, 1914, in Philadelphia. This led to the formation of an "American Ukrainian People's Rada" (Американська Українська Народна Рада) which also worked during the war providing assistance to injured Ukrainians in Galicia and Transcarpathia.

The nascent nationalist populism generated by these war-relief efforts led directly to calls for a national convention of like-minded individuals promoting Ukrainian statehood and Ukrainian self-identity. Two such conventions were organized during the period of the Great War:

- the "First Ukrainian Soim in America" (Перший Український Сойм в Америці) convened 295 delegates representing 457 constituencies in New York City on October 30–31, 1915. At this event, a Federation of Ukrainians in the United States (Федерація Українців у Злучених Державах) was established, which went on to organize protests and advocacy campaigns within the United States, collected money for charitable purposes and political actions within Ukraine, and published brochures and pamphlets through the war years. Under its leadership, a Ukrainian Information Bureau was established in Washington, D.C., for the first time, in coordination with Congressman James A. Hamill.
- following the Armistice of 11 November 1918, political alliances began to shift in the United States. Throughout the war years, several community organizations broke away from supporting the Federation, and formed their own "Ukrainian Alliance of America" (Український Альянс Америки), mainly due to disagreements with the influential Socialist voices within the Federation's leadership. With the cessation of hostilities in Europe, the Alliance quickly reformed itself into the Ukrainian National Committee (Український Національний Комітет) and called for a national convention before the Paris Peace Conference. On 16-17 January 1919, a convention was assembled in New York City, while representatives of the committee also traveled to Paris with Rep. Hamill. At the New York Convention, it was resolved that Ukrainian Americans would voice their support for US postwar plans to restore the peace, appealed to President Woodrow Wilson to appear at the Paris Peace Conference as a "defender of the rights of the Ukrainian people" according to his Fourteen Points, and to financially assist official representatives the Ukrainian People's Republic and West Ukrainian People's Republic to participate at the peace conference.

=== United Ukrainian Organizations of the United States ===
On October 26–27, 1922, a Ukrainian National Congress convened in Philadelphia for the purpose of creating a new Ukrainian American umbrella organization, the United Ukrainian Organizations of the United States (Обєднаннє {sic} Українських Організацій в Америці). Between 1923 and 1939, the Obyednannye would organize 7 additional national conventions, referred to as "Congresses of Ukrainians in America." During its existence, Ukraine would fall victim to Stalin's Holodomor. In response, the Obyednannye raised nearly 250,000 dollars to help Ukrainian organizations in Western Europe and in Western Ukraine and organized protest campaigns against the Famine-Genocide in Soviet Ukraine.

As with the invasion of Lviv by Russian forces in 1914, the joint invasion of Poland by Nazi Germany and the Soviet Union in September 1939 once again shifted political alliances in the United States, and stirred the Ukrainian American community to do more for their ancestral homeland. At the final Congress of Ukrainians in America organized by the Obyednannye, which gathered at the Hotel Imperial in New York City on December 2, 1939, delegates voted overwhelmingly to dissolve the current confederation and call for the convening of an "All-Ukrainian National Congress" in 1940 for the purpose of creating a Supreme Representative Body of American Ukrainians.

By February 1940, the four largest national [fraternal organizations had taken over the initiative of convoking an All-Ukrainian National Congress, namely the Ukrainian National Association (UNA), the Providence Association of Ukrainian Catholics in America, the Ukrainian Workingmen's Association, and the Ukrainian National Aid Association.

=== First Ukrainian American Congress ===
Having duly considered the plight of the Ukrainian people in their native but foreign occupied and enslaved Ukraine, we, representatives of American-Ukrainian political, fraternal and cultural organizations, convened in the Congress of American Ukrainians in Washington on, Friday, May 24, 1940, do regard it our privilege and duty, at this time when our kinsmen over there are gagged by their oppressors, to take a stand in defense of their right to free and independent national existence, and to declare that the Ukrainian people will never cease their centuries old struggle until they have achieved the establishment of a free, independent and democratic state of Ukraine.

— Preamble, First Memorandum of the Ukrainian Congress Committee of America

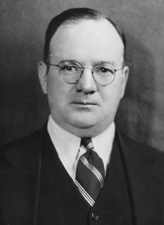
In his remarks to the delegates, Senator Francis Maloney (D-CT) compared the plight of Ukrainians with that of the Irish, who had fought "700 years for liberty."

804 delegates from 168 different localities, as well as over 200 invited guests, gathered at the historic Washington Hotel in Washington, D.C., on May 24, 1940. In addition to those representing the large fraternal organizations who initiated the gathering, delegates in attendance represented the Organization for the Rebirth of Ukraine (ODWU), the Ukrainian National Women's League of America, the Association of Ukrainian Sich Riflemen, Ukrainian American Veterans, Ukrainian Catholic parishes and brotherhoods, Ukrainian Orthodox parishes and brotherhoods, the Association of Greek-Catholic Ruthenian Brotherhoods, political associations, various Ukrainian American Clubs, National Homes, political clubs, choir associations, dance and drama clubs, and others. Delegates travelled from the states of New York, New Jersey, Pennsylvania, Connecticut, Massachusetts, Rhode Island, Delaware, Maryland, West Virginia, Ohio, Illinois, Michigan, Minnesota, Missouri, and California.

At the time of the first Congress, the Soviet Union was still months away from being expelled from the League of Nations for colluding with Hitler and invading Finland, and President Franklin D. Roosevelt had yet to order a massive modernization of the United States Navy. Pro-communist and Russophile propagandists actively sought to negate the claims of Ukrainian nationalists calling for support of an independent Ukraine.

The physical gathering of delegates took place over the course of a single day, with speeches and appearances by US legislators taking precedence over formal elections. Speakers included then-House Majority Whip Representative Patrick J. Boland (D-PA), then-Dean of the United States House of Representatives Rep. Adolph J. Sabath (D-IL), Senator Joseph F. Guffey (D-PA), Sen. James J. Davis (R-PA), Sen. Francis T. Maloney (D-CT), Rep. J. Harold Flannery (D-PA), Rep. Lewis K. Rockefeller (R-NY), Rep. Jerry Voorhis (D-CA), Rep. Francis E. Walter (D-PA), and Rep. Caroline O'Day (D-NY), the first woman Democrat elected to Congress. Presentations were given on topics including "To What Extent Ukrainians Have Contributed to the Cultural And Material Development of America," "The Economic Foundations of an Independent Ukraine," "Our Assistance To Ukraine," and others. The work of hundreds of organizers preceded the Washington gathering, and a widely published editorial was released to coincide with the meeting, entitled, "Ukrainians Prepare For Independence."

At the conclusion of the Congress, a gala concert was performed featuring a Ukrainian Chorus under the direction of renowned Ukrainian maestro Alexander Koshetz. Adorned in vyshyvanka and Ukrainian wreaths, the singers performed stirring renditions of the Ukrainian anthem Shche ne vmerla Ukraina and the Star-Spangled Banner. Artists such as the soprano Maria Hrebenetska added to the gala with performances of works by Mykola Lysenko and more contemporary works.

In the year following this first congress, Nazi Germany would invade Ukraine, and Japan would attack Pearl Harbor. While the US had resisted involvement in the war during the first Ukrainian Congress, by January 1944, the Allied powers had already begun plans for major counteroffensives.

=== II Congress ===

The "Second Congress of Americans of Ukrainian Descent" was held at the Hotel Benjamin Franklin, in Philadelphia, PA, on January 22–23, 1944. With Joseph Stalin now a wartime ally of the United States, following the Nazi invasion of Soviet-occupied Ukraine, Communists and Russophiles, encouraged by their Soviet leaders and agencies, sought to vilify American Ukrainians in America wherever they could. Anti-Ukrainian propaganda even extended to American press and broadcasts, including the radio editorials of Walter Winchell. Anti-Ukrainian books such as Sabotage! The Secret War Against America (1942), by Albert E. Kahn and Michael Sayers accused Ukrainian immigrants of conspiring against the United States. This hostile atmosphere made planning for another national gathering difficult for Ukrainian-Americans, especially with wartime travel restrictions in place.

Without any U.S. government officials attending, 235 delegates voted on an ambitious program of activity to support both the United States and Ukraine's continuing struggle for independence. The second Congress approved an American-Ukrainian war bond drive, the establishment of United Ukrainian American Relief Committee for Ukrainian war victims and refugees, and the publication of the only English-language scholarly journal on Ukraine for its time – The Ukrainian Quarterly.

=== III Congress ===
At the close of the war, a delegation of Ukrainian-American representatives which had been elected at the second Congress in 1944, flew to San Francisco to advocate on behalf of a free Ukraine during the formation of the United Nations, convening at the Conference on International Organization in May 1945. Contrary to the hopes of the UCCA delegates, Soviet-occupied Ukraine was officially recognized as a member state of the United Nations in June 1945.

In light of the developments at the United Nations, 322 Ukrainian American delegates and invited guests gathered at the Almas Temple in Washington, D.C., on May 31, 1946. At the "Third Congress of Americans of Ukrainian Descent," a unified national platform was agreed upon, supporting a non-isolationist U.S. foreign policy, to confront an emergent "totalitarian-imperialistic U.S.S.R." Furthermore, the ideals incorporated into the 1941 Atlantic Charter as delineated by President Roosevelt and Prime Minister Churchill, were formally embraced by the delegates at the third Congress, as well as President Roosevelt's goals of Freedom of speech, Freedom of Worship, Freedom from Want, and Freedom from fear; otherwise referred to as the "Four Freedoms." As with the second Congress, there were no elected US officials in attendance at the third Congress, although Fred Zaplitny, a member of the Canadian House of Commons did attend and delivered greetings from his fellow Ukrainian Canadians.

Following the third Congress, UCCA chairman Stephan Shumeyko flew to the Paris Peace Conference, delivering UCCA memorandums to delegations representing governments across the world. As the Western Allied countries would begin to wind down their sponsorship of Displaced Person (DP) zones in Europe, the UCCA would focus its attention on the million displaced persons in Europe, more than half of whom were in the U.S. Zone. The newly formed United Ukrainian American Relief Committee (founded at the second Congress) coordinated Ukrainian American efforts towards the enactment of the Displaced Persons Act of 1948, providing for more than 200,000 DPs to enter the US over the next two years, 85,000 of whom were Ukrainians.

=== IV Congress ===
Between 1938 and 1952, the United Ukrainian American Relief Committee assisted in the immigration of over 33,000 displaced Ukrainian refugees to the United States; sponsorship by additional charities more than doubled the number of new Ukrainian immigrants into the diaspora. Whereas earlier waves of Ukrainian immigration fled from poverty and arrived mostly illiterate, the political refugees driven out of their country by the recent war and persecution had on average a decade of education, while many were college graduates and professionals. These newer arrivals brought with them the organizational mindset which led to the flourishing of organizations such as the Ukrainian American Youth Association, the Federation of Ukrainian Student Organizations of America, the Organization of Democratic Ukrainian Youth, and the Shevchenko Scientific Society. In 1947, a Pan-American Ukrainian Conference was organized for the first time, uniting the organizing efforts of the UCCA, the Ukrainian Canadian Congress, the Ukrainian Central Representation in Argentina and the Society of Friends of Ukrainian Culture in Brazil.

Representatives of this newest wave of immigrants were among the 308 delegates and invited guests who participated at the "Fourth Congress of Americans of Ukrainian Descent" (Четвертий Конґрес Американських Українців), which took place from November 5–6, 1949, again at the Almas Temple in Washington, D.C. The newer immigrants presented reports on the state of displaced Ukrainians scattered throughout Europe, as well as read greetings from Ukrainian leaders in Eastern Ukraine, Western Ukraine, Carpathian Ukraine and other regions.

... You are to be commended for your interest and participation in our democracy and also for your interest in and effort to aid your kinsmen overseas who are not able to enjoy the benefits of a free society which we in the United States are fortunate to enjoy ...

— From the Message of President Truman to the Fourth Congress of American Ukrainians

Unlike the II and III Congresses, the IV Congress saw the return of US government officials paying attention to the organized Ukrainian diaspora, beginning with the first Presidential greeting sent to a Ukraine Congress, from newly re-elected President Harry S. Truman. Senator H. Alexander Smith (R-NJ) addressed the delegates, representing some 472 different organizations, that it was the great privilege and responsibility of the United States to lead and assist in Ukraine's efforts to "throw off the shackles of imperialism," and hailed the "grim determination of courageous individuals to secure their freedom rather than yield to the tempting allurements of fascist-nazism or communist-marxism." Also addressing the delegates, was Under Secretary of State Herbert A. Fierst, Editor of Svoboda Luka Myshuha, founding president of the Ukrainian Canadian Committee, the Rev. Wasyl Kushnir, founding president of the newly-formed World Federation of Ukrainian Women's Organizations Olena Kysilevska, Mykola Lebed of the Ukrainian Supreme Liberation Council, as well as Edward J. Shaughnessy, director of the Immigration and Naturalization Service, New York, who urged Ukrainians to share the truth about life outside the Iron Curtain with their friends and family who remained in Europe.

America is appreciative of your many accomplishments – in time of peace, your contribution to industrial, cultural and community enterprises – in time of war, the many sacrifices that left in the place of loved ones a gold star, a citation for heroic service, or the Congressional Medal of Honor. You and your children have become an integral part of this country.

— Edward J. Shaughnessy

Georgetown Professor Lev Dobriansky was elected as UCCA President for the first time, succeeding Stephen Shumeyko.

=== V Congress ===
The "Fifth Congress of Americans of Ukrainian Descent" (П'ятий Конґрес Американських Українців) was held on July 4–6, 1952, at the Hotel Statler in New York City. The first of many Congresses to take place in New York City, the event was the most well attended with 799 delegates from 25 states and nearly 1,500 in total attendance, generating plenty of interest from the New York press. The Cold War with the Soviets had by then begun in earnest, ensnaring the United States military in another campaign – the Korean War. The Mutual Security Act of 1951 launched a new era of American Foreign Aid, and more pressingly for an immigrant population, Congress had recently enacted the Immigration and Nationality Act of 1952 over the veto of President Truman, which changed the quota systems that determined which ethnic groups were 'desirable immigrants.'

Addressing the delegates, the Secretary of the Interior, Oscar L. Chapman, remarked, "The Ukrainian tradition is completely in harmony with the American tradition. A thousand years ago, before the existence of the North American continent was known, the great Kingdom of Kiev was the political and cultural creation of the Ukrainian people, the easternmost bastion of Western culture. Still later, the rising princes of Moscovy came to assert their mastery. The independence of Kiev vanished, and there began a long period of foreign rule, which unhappily exists to this day. But at the heart of the Ukrainian tradition lies the significant fact that although political independence was destroyed, the great desire for independence did not die."

Additional guests and speakers included retired Admiral and recent U.S. Ambassador to the Soviet Union, Alan Goodrich Kirk, former United States Commissioner of Displaced Persons and staff member of the newly-formed United States National Security Council, Edward O'Connor, the President of the Government of the Ukrainian People's Republic in exile, Stepan Vytvytskyi, Mykola Lebed of the Ukrainian Supreme Liberation Council, Legislative Assistant to President Truman, Joseph Feeney, Deputy Mayor of New York City Charles Horowitz, and U.S. Army Lieutenant General and former director of the Manhattan Project, Leslie Groves.

Professor Lev Dobriansky was re-elected as UCCA President.

=== VI Congress ===
The "Sixth Congress of Americans of Ukrainian Descent" (Шостий Конґрес Американських Українців) took place in the Hotel Commodore in New York City, from the May 28 to 30, 1955. Voting participants included 430 delegates. Guests and speakers included the then-governor of New York and former United States Secretary of Commerce, W. Averell Harriman, and the President of the Government of the Ukrainian People's Republic in exile, Stepan Vytvytskyi.

Topics of discussion by delegates and speakers included The Ukrainian Liberation Cause and the Contemporary International Situation, Ukrainian Participation in Political, Civic and Labor-Union Activities in the United States, and Tasks of the UCCA and its Branches including Problems of Organization, Need for Information Services, and relations with American Institutions.

Congressman Michael A. Feighan (D-OH) and former Congressman Charles J. Kersten (R-WI) were presented Honorary Doctorates by representatives of the Ukrainian Free University in Munich. The ceremony featured a performance of Gaudeamus igitur by the Ukrainian Chorus Dumka of New York.

Professor Lev Dobriansky was elected to a new position of UCCA Chairman, and Dmytro Halychyn was elected to succeed Prof. Dobriansky as UCCA President.

=== VII Congress ===
The "Seventh Congress of Americans of Ukrainian Descent" (Сьомий Конґрес Американських Українців) gathered on February 21–23, 1959, at the Hotel Statler Hilton, in Washington, D.C. Voting participants included 292 delegates. Guests and speakers included representatives from the Polish, Lithuanian, Latvian, Belarusan, Czech, Slovak and Caucuses diaspora communities in America, U.S. Senator Thomas J. Dodd (D-CT), and Congressman Walter Judd (R-MN). U.S. Vice-president Richard Nixon and then-acting Secretary of State and former Governor of Massachusetts Christian Herter sent greetings to the delegates which were read aloud from the podium. A special resolution passed from the floor of the convention wishing a speedy recovery to John Foster Dulles, who unfortunately died later that year.

Topics of discussion by delegates and speakers included the Continued Oppression the Ukrainian people by all methods known to and perfected by Joseph Stalin, including brutal Russification and Genocide, Strengthening of Voice of America Broadcasts not only Technically, but Politically, and supporting non-Russian nations under Soviet Captivity by recognizing their specific national and political problems in radio broadcasts, by honoring their national holidays and by stressing American interest in their eventual liberation.

Professor Lev Dobriansky was re-elected as UCCA Chairman and Dmytro Halychyn was re-elected as UCCA President.

=== VIII Congress ===
The "Eighth Congress of Americans of Ukrainian Descent" (Восьмий Конґрес Американських Українців) gathered on October 12–14, 1962, at the Hotel Commodore, in New York City. Voting participants included 341 delegates. The Congress was conducted under an oversized banner with the slogan "Towards the Liberation and Emancipation of the Captive Nations," and portraits of Taras Shevchenko and Abraham Lincoln were displayed behind the dais, linking the 100th anniversary of the Emancipation Proclamation with UCCA's then-active drive to complete the Taras Shevchenko Memorial in Washington, D.C. President John F. Kennedy dispatched a telegram greeting to the delegates which was delivered at the opening session.

Guests and speakers included U.S. Senator Jacob Javits (R-NY), Deputy Assistant Secretary of State Carl Rowan, the Permanent Representative of China to the United Nations Tsiang Tingfu, Cuban scholar Herminio Portell Vilá, Director of the International Affairs Department for the Anti-Defamation League Joseph L. Lichten, and President of the Conference of Americans of Central and Eastern European Descent (CACEED) the Rev. John Balkunas.

Topics of discussion by the delegates at roundtable and panel discussions included The Future Objectives of the UCCA, as well as a special roundtable discussion about U.S. Foreign Policy Toward the USSR. Future UCCA President Ihnat Bilynsky delivered a special statement commemorating the 20th anniversary of the Ukrainian Insurgent Army (UPA). Following the recent public revelation by Bohdan Stashynsky that he had murdered both Lev Rebet and Stepan Bandera in the late 1950s at the direction of the KGB, a resolution was unanimously adopted from the floor of the convention condemning the assassinations and demanding that "the government of the USSR be brought before a court of international justice as the principal culprit in these genocidal killings."

Following the opening plenary, a special "Lincoln Luncheon" highlighted the first day of the convention, at which the inaugural Shevchenko Freedom Awards were bestowed by UCCA. The recipients were Congressman Ed Derwinski (R-IL) and Congressman Daniel Flood (D-PA). At the formal congressional banquet, Governor of New York and future Vice President of the United States Nelson Rockefeller gave the keynote address.

Professor Lev Dobriansky was re-elected as UCCA President, and his previous position as UCCA Chairman was removed from the Organizational Bylaws. Past Presidents Dmytro Halychyn and Stephen Shumeyko, who had died since the VII Congress, were recognized.

=== IX Congress ===
The "Ninth Congress of Americans of Ukrainian Descent" gathered on October 7–9, 1966, at the New York Hilton Hotel, in New York City.

Professor Lev Dobriansky was re-elected as UCCA President by the delegates to the "Ninth Congress of Americans of Ukrainian Descent."

=== X Congress ===
The "Tenth Congress of Ukrainians in the U.S.A." gathered on October 24–26, 1969, at the Commodore Hotel, in New York City. https://www.ukrweekly.com/archive/1969/The_Ukrainian_Weekly_1969-37.pdf

Professor Lev Dobriansky was re-elected as UCCA President by the delegates to the "Tenth Congress of Ukrainians in the U.S.A."

=== XI Congress ===
The "Eleventh Congress of Ukrainians in the U.S.A." gathered on October 6–8, 1972, at the Hotel Commodore, in New York City.

Professor Lev Dobriansky was re-elected as UCCA President by the delegates to the "Eleventh Congress of Ukrainians in the U.S.A."

=== XII Congress ===
The "Twelfth Congress of Ukrainians in the U.S.A." gathered on October 8–10, 1976, at the Americana Hotel, in New York City.

Professor Lev Dobriansky was re-elected as UCCA President by the delegates to the "Twelfth Congress of Ukrainians in the U.S.A."

=== XIII Congress ===
The "Thirteenth Congress of Ukrainians in the U.S.A." gathered on October 10–12, 1980, at the Hotel Benjamin Franklin, in Philadelphia.

Professor Lev Dobriansky was re-elected as UCCA President by the delegates to the "Thirteenth Congress of Ukrainians in the U.S.A."

=== XIV Congress ===
The "Fourteenth Congress of Ukrainians in the U.S.A." gathered on November 23–25, 1984, at the Hotel Waldorf Astoria, in New York City.

Ihnat Bilynsky was elected as UCCA President by the delegates to the "Fourteenth Congress of Ukrainians in the U.S.A."

=== XV Congress ===
The "Fifteenth Congress of Ukrainians in the USA" gathered on September 16–18, 1988, at the L'Enfant Plaza Hotel, in Washington, D.C.

Ihnat Bilynsky was re-elected as UCCA President by the delegates to the "Fifteenth Congress of Ukrainians in the U.S.A."

=== XVI Congress ===
The "Sixteenth Congress of Ukrainians in America" gathered on October 16–18, 1992, at the Ramada Hotel in East Hanover, NJ.

On the concluding day of the convention, the delegates to the XVI Congress of Ukrainians in America nominated and elected Askold Lozynskyj to serve as UCCA President, followed by the election of the rest of the National Executive Board of UCCA.

=== XVII Congress ===
The "Seventeenth Congress of Ukrainians in America" gathered on October 18–20, 1996, at the Ramada Hotel in East Hanover, NJ.

Guests and speakers included Member of Ukraine's Parliament and chair of the Anti-Bolshevik Bloc of Nations Slava Stetsko, Permanent Representative of Ukraine to the United Nations Anatoliy Zlenko, former Congressman and United States Secretary of Veterans Affairs Ed Derwinski, Ukrainian World Congress Board Member Oleh Romanyshyn, U.S. Federal Appeals Judge Bohdan A. Futey, and Archbishop Vsevolod Majdansky of the Ukrainian Orthodox Church of the USA.

Topics of discussion by the delegates at roundtable and panel discussions included Aiding Ukraine, Education and Social Impact, Our Ukrainian American Voice in Washington, and Reviving the Ukrainian American Community.

At the formal congressional banquet, a written statement from Sen. Frank Lautenberg was read to the attendees, followed by the announcement of the recipients of the 1996 Shevchenko Freedom Awards: United States ambassador to the United Nations Madeleine Albright accepted on behalf of President Bill Clinton, Consul General of Ukraine in New York Viktor Kryzhanivsky accepted on behalf of Minister of Foreign Affairs of Ukraine Hennadiy Udovenko, and the Chair of the House Committee on International Relations, Congressman Benjamin Gilman.

On the concluding day of the convention, the delegates to the XVII Congress of Ukrainians in America nominated and re-elected Askold Lozynskyj to serve as UCCA President for a second term, followed by the election of the rest of the National Executive Board of UCCA.

=== XVIII Congress ===
The "Eighteenth Congress of Ukrainians in America" gathered on October 13–15, 2000, at the Chicago Marriott O'Hare in Chicago, IL. Voting participants were 145 delegates representing 35 UCCA branches and 20 Members Organizations of the National Council. Guests included Consul General of Ukraine in Chicago, Borys Basylevsky, and Press Secretary of Narodnyi Rukh, Dmytro Ponomarchuk.

Topics of discussion by the delegates at roundtable and panel discussions included Aid to Ukraine, Your Voice in Washington, The Fourth Wave of Immigrants, Ukrainian Saturday Schools, Ukrainian-American Military Affairs, and Student and Youth Activism.

Over 350 people attended the formal congressional banquet, which was held at the hotel. Senator Richard Durbin (D-IL) led the list of guest speakers, which also included Ukraine's Minister of Labor and Social Policy, Ivan Skakhan, Ukraine's Ambassador to the United States, Kostyantyn Gryshchenko, and Viktor Pedenko, Secretary-General of the Ukrainian World Congress. At the banquet, the recipients of the 2000 Shevchenko Freedom Awards were announced as well for their many years of dedicated service to UCCA and the Ukrainian American community: Atena Pashko (in honor of her late husband Viacheslav Chornovil), Natalka Shukhevych (wife of the late Ukrainian General Roman Shukhevych), Evhen Ivashkiv, Wolodymyr Stojko, Mychailo Spontak, Lev Futala, Mychailo Kowalczyn, Ivan Teluk, Myroslaw Charkewych, Evhen Fedorenko and Ivan Burtyk.

On the concluding day of the convention, the delegates to the XVIII Congress of Ukrainians in America nominated and unanimously voted for Michael Sawkiw Jr., to serve as UCCA President, followed by the election of the rest of the National Executive Board of UCCA.

=== XIX Congress ===
The "Nineteenth Congress of Ukrainians in America" gathered on September 24–26, 2004, at the Crowne Plaza Hotel in Philadelphia, PA.

Voting participants were 120 delegates, including delegates from the Ukrainian National Association. Guests and speakers included Senator Richard Durbin (D-IL), Ukraine's Ambassador to the United States Mykhailo Reznik, Major Archbishop of Kyiv-Galicia Liubomyr Cardinal Huzar, Archbishop Vsevolod Majdansky of the Ukrainian Orthodox Church of the USA, Metropolitan Archbishop Stefan Soroka, Bishop Basil H. Losten, and former U.S. Ambassador to Ukraine Roman Popadiuk.

Topics of discussion by the delegates at roundtable and panel discussions included Maintaining/Preserving our Identity, Unifying the Ukrainian American Community, Using Mass Media to Get Your Message Out, Advocacy – Your Voice in American Politics, Support for Ukraine - Furthering Democracy & Ukrainization, Outreach Programs for New Immigrants and Youth, Ukrainian Studies in the Western Diaspora (in particular the United States), Human Trafficking, and the Past, Present and Future of Schools of Ukrainian Studies in America.

At the formal congressional banquet, the recipients of the 2004 Shevchenko Freedom Awards were announced as well for their many years of dedicated service to UCCA and the Ukrainian American community: Jack Palance, United States Army Major General Nicholas Krawciw, Myron Kuropas, and Congressman Curt Weldon on behalf of the entire Congressional Ukraine Caucus.

On the concluding day of the convention, the delegates to the XIX Congress of Ukrainians in America nominated and unanimously re-elected Michael Sawkiw Jr., to serve as UCCA President for a second term, followed by the election of the rest of the National Executive Board of UCCA.

=== XX Congress ===
The "Twentieth Congress of Ukrainians in America" gathered on October 17–19, 2008, at the Sheraton Cleveland Airport Hotel in Cleveland, OH.

On the concluding day of the convention, the delegates to the XX Congress of Ukrainians in America nominated and elected Tamara Gallo-Olexy to serve as UCCA President, followed by the election of the rest of the National Executive Board of UCCA.

=== XXI Congress ===
The "Twenty-First Congress of Ukrainians in America" gathered on September 28–30, 2012, at the Ukrainian Youth Center in Yonkers, NY.

On the concluding day of the convention, the delegates to the XX Congress of Ukrainians in America nominated and re-elected Tamara Gallo-Olexy to serve as UCCA President for a second term, followed by the election of the rest of the National Executive Board of UCCA.

=== XXII Congress ===
The "Twenty-Second Congress of Ukrainians in America" gathered on September 23–25, 2016, at the Ukrainian National Home in Hartford, CT.

On the concluding day of the convention, the delegates to the XXII Congress of Ukrainians in America nominated and elected Andrew Futey to serve as UCCA President, followed by the election of the rest of the National Executive Board of UCCA.

=== XXIII Congress ===
The "Twenty-Third Congress of Ukrainians in America" gathered on October 11-13, 2024, at the Holiday Inn Lansdale-Hatfield in Kulpsville, Pennsylvania.

On the concluding day of the convention, the delegates to the XXIII Congress of Ukrainians in America nominated and elected Michael Sawkiw Jr., to serve as UCCA President for a third term, followed by the election of the rest of the National Executive Board of UCCA.

== See also ==
- Ukraine–United States relations
- Senate Ukraine Caucus
- Congressional Ukrainian Caucus
- Ukrainian World Congress
- Ukrainian diaspora
- Ukrainian Americans
- Ukrainian American Coordinating Council
- The Federation of Ukrainian Student Organizations of America (SUSTA)
- Ukrainian National Women's League of America
- Ukrainian Catholic Archeparchy of Philadelphia
- Ukrainian Orthodox Church of the USA
- List of Ukrainian enclaves in North American cities
- Ukrainian Americans in New York City
- Ukrainian Americans in Los Angeles
- Ukrainian Village, Chicago
- Ukrainian Association of Washington State
- History of the Ukrainians in Baltimore
- Razom
- Crimean Tatar diaspora
- Joint Baltic American National Committee
- Polish American Congress
- Belarusian Congress Committee of America
