= Senate Ukraine Caucus =

Political caucus in United States

- Overlay of the flags of the U.S. and Ukraine
- Co-Chairs: Dick Durbin; Roger Wicker
- Vice-Chairs: Chris Murphy; Sherrod Brown; Jeanne Shaheen; Ron Johnson
- Founded: February 9, 2015
- Headquarters: Washington, D.C.
- Seats in the Senate: 15 / 100

The Senate Ukraine Caucus (SUC) is a bipartisan caucus of the United States Senate that was inaugurated on February 9, 2015 in Washington, D.C. Its mission is "to strengthen the political, military, economic, and cultural relationship between the United States and Ukraine."

Its counterpart in the House of Representatives is the Congressional Ukraine Caucus, which was established in 1997 and consists of 93 representatives.

== Members ==
Senators Dick Durbin (D-IL) and Roger Wicker (R-MS) co-chair the SUC. Senator Durbin co-founded the caucus along with now-retired Senator Rob Portman (R-OH). The two remained the caucus' Co-Chairs until Portman's retirement in 2023. Senators Chris Murphy (D-CT), Sherrod Brown (D-OH), Jeanne Shaheen (D-NH), and Ron Johnson (R-WI) are the caucus' Vice-Chairs.

The Senate Ukraine Caucus consists of 17 senators and one state attorney general (9 Democrats and 9 Republicans):

- John Barrasso (R-WY)
- Richard Blumenthal (D-CT)
- William Tong (D-CT)
- Adam Schiff (D-CA)
- Elissa Slotkin (D-MI)
- John Cornyn (R-TX)
- Kevin Cramer (R-ND)
- Dick Durbin (D-IL)
- Joni Ernst (R-IA)
- Ron Johnson (R-WI)
- Amy Klobuchar (D-MN)
- Cynthia Lummis (R-WY)
- Chris Murphy (D-CT)
- Gary Peters (D-MI)
- Marco Rubio (R-FL)
- Rick Scott (R-FL)
- Jeanne Shaheen (D-NH)
- Roger Wicker (R-MS)

== Former members ==
After 2024 elections:

- Sen. Sherrod Brown (D-OH) (lost reelection)
- Sen. Bob Casey Jr. (D-PA) (lost reelection)
- Sen. Ben Cardin (D-MD) (retired)

After 2022 elections:

- Sen. Jim Inhofe (R-OK) (resigned)
- Sen. Rob Portman (R-OH) (retired)
- Sen. Pat Toomey (R-PA) (retired)

After 2018 elections:

- Sen. Joe Donnelly (D-IN) (lost reelection)
- Sen. Bill Nelson (D-FL) (lost reelection)

After 2016 elections:

- Sen. Kelly Ayotte (R-NH) (lost reelection)
- Sen. Mark Kirk (R-IL) (lost reelection)

== Relevant legislation ==
- United States International Programming to Ukraine and Neighboring Regions (S.R. 2183), introduced on March 27, 2014
- Ukraine Freedom Support Act of 2014 (S.R. 2828), introduced on September 16, 2014

== See also ==
- Ukrainian Congress Committee of America, a non-profit organization representing the interests of Ukrainian-Americans
