= George Gajecky =

Historian (b. 1941)

- Юрій Гаєцький
- Born: April 23, 1941 (age 85); Lviv, Ukraine
- Education: DePaul University; Roosevelt University; University of Chicago
- Scientific career
- Fields: History of Ukraine

George Gajecky (Ukrainian: Юрій Теодозійович Гаєцький, Yurii Gajecky; born 23 April 1941) is a Ukrainian American historian, educator, and public activist. He currently serves as president of the Ukrainian Educational Council, the central organ of Ukrainian Saturday schools in the United States.

== Biography ==
George Gajecky was born in Lviv, Ukraine. Along with his parents, he immigrated to Austria in 1944, during the Second World War. In 1950, the family moved to the United States. Gajecky lived in Chicago. During his school years, he actively participated in the cultural life of the Ukrainian diaspora in the US. Particularly, he was a member of Ukrainian Plast and graduated from a school of Ukrainian studies.

Gajecky graduated from the DePaul University in 1964 with a Bachelor of Arts History degree. In 1966, he obtained a Master of Arts degree in history in the Roosevelt University. Gajecky moved on to work in the University of Chicago (1967–1978). In 1978, he obtained a Ph.D. in history in the University of Chicago.

Gajecky's scholarly career has been mostly connected with his work in the field of Ukrainian history and Ukrainian studies in general. Particularly, he was a senior fellow at the Harvard Ukrainian Research Institute in Harvard University (1981–1992). After Ukraine gained independence in the early 1990s, Gajecky worked as a history professor in National University of Kyiv-Mohyla Academy (1994–1997).

Apart from scientific activities, George Gajecky has been engaged in educational work related to schools of Ukrainian studies in the United States. Particularly, he was a principal of the Ukrainian studies school in Chicago (1979–1981) and a history teacher in the Ukrainian studies school "Samopomich" (1997–2004). Since 1986, Gajecky has been teaching history at teacher-training courses organized by the Ukrainian American Educational Council at Soyuzivka, a Ukrainian cultural center in New York State.

Since the late 1990s–early 2000s, Gajecky has been occupying leadership positions in the Ukrainian Educational Council, serving as a member of the executive board of the Educational Council. Since 2003, he served as deputy president under president Eugene Fedorenko. Upon Fedorenko's retirement in 2016, George Gajecky was elected the next president of the Ukrainian Educational Council. He currently serves in this position as of 2019.

== Works ==
The scholarly interests of George Gajecky's as a historian relate to the history of Ukrainian Cossacks and the Cossack Hetmanate. Besides, he explores the development of Orthodox brotherhoods and the history of education, particularly school education, in Ukraine. Some of Gajecky's major works include a two-volume work Cossack Administration of the Hetmanate, a two-volume book Cossacks in the Thirty Years War, contribution to several contemporary history encyclopedias, and around 200 scholarly articles published throughout his scientific career.

== Bibliography ==
- G. Gajecky. Cossack Administration of the Hetmanate, 2 volumes, Cambridge, MA, 1978.
- G. Gajecky, A. Baran. The Cossacks in the Thirty Years' War, 1619—1624. Vol. 1. Rome, PP. Basiliani, 1969.
- G. Gajecky, A. Baran. The Cossacks in the Thirty Years' War, 1625—1648. Vol. 2. Rome, PP. Basiliani, 1983.
- Золота книга: 50 років Школи українознавства ОУА «Самопоміч» у Нью-Йорку, 1949—1999. Нью-Йорк, 1999.
- Ю. Гаєцький. Новітня історія України. 1945—2001 рр. Нью-Йорк: Вид-во Шкільної Ради УККА, 2002.
- Альманах Станіславівської землі: збірник матеріалів до історії Станіславова і Станіславівщини. Том 3. Редактор-упорядник Ю. Гаєцький. Іван-Франківськ, 2009
