= Ukrainian American Educational Council =

Ukrainian Educational Council USA (UCCA Ukrainian Educational Council, Ukrainian Educational Council; Ukrainian: Шкільна Рада при УККА) is the central organ of Saturday schools of Ukrainian Studies in the United States. The responsibilities of the organization include conducting a general oversight of the schools it controls and providing advice, setting and revising programs and curricula, training teachers, as well as vetting and publishing textbooks for Ukrainian Saturday schools in the US. Ukrainian Educational Council is an autonomous organization within the Ukrainian Congress Committee of America, an umbrella organization which unites around two dozens Ukrainian American organizations.

== History ==
Ukrainian Educational Council was created in 1953 at the school conference, where delegates from 22 schools decided to set up a central body which would assume control over the system of private Ukrainian schools. The goal of the Ukrainian schools was for the American Ukrainians to "preserve the Ukrainian language and Ukrainian culture". In the 1960s, the Educational Council controlled more than 60 schools, which gave education for around 6,000 students and employed some 400 teachers. The number of schools that comprise the Ukrainian Educational Council has declined since then. For example, as of 2003, the Educational Council had 35 member-schools, which consisted of around 2,600 students and teachers; in 2011, this number slightly increased to 40 schools, while the number of student and teachers generally remained stable. Over the history, more than 30,000 students studied in these schools.

The first president of the Educational Council was Edward Zarskyi, who served as president in 1953-1954. He was replaced by Volodymyr Kalyna (1954-1961), before returning to his post in 1961 and serving as president until 1977. Edward Zarskyi was then followed by Roman Drazhniowsky (1977-1983). After Drazhniowsky, Eugene Fedorenko became the next president and served until 2016, when he was succeeded by George Gajecky and then, in 2019, by Volodymyr H. Bodnar.

Since 1985, the Ukrainian Educational Council has been organizing an annual two-week seminar for teachers of Ukrainian Saturday schools, where teachers attend lectures on disciplines related to Ukrainian studies. The seminar is held at Soyuzivka, a Ukrainian cultural center in New York State maintained by the Ukrainian National Association.

== Activity ==
As the Educational Council is the central governing body of Ukrainian Saturday schools in the United States, it "performs the necessary task of centralizing and guiding Ukrainian private education, establishing standards and goals for the schools, and providing standardized final exams". Apart from the general task of setting the standards of Ukrainian education in the US, the Ukrainian Educational Council is involved in organizational work such as providing training to teachers and preparing and distributing textbooks to Ukrainian schools The organization prepares journal Ridna Shkola, which is published three times a year.

The network of schools which comprise the Educational Council is nationwide, stretching from Boston, Massachusetts to Washington state. The specific curricula differ from school to school, with the majority of schools offering an 11-years course of study, while several schools maintain a full 12-year program. The study disciplines taught in Ukrainian Saturday schools include Ukrainian language, Ukrainian literature, history of Ukraine, as well as Ukrainian geography and culture. Some schools provide optional religious instruction.

The governing structure of the Education Council consists of:

- Executive Council (president, vice-presidents, secretaries, treasurer, members);
- Auditing Committee;
- Arbitration Board
