= Ukrainian Americans in Los Angeles =

The Ukrainian Diaspora in Los Angeles is the population of Ukrainian immigrants and Ukrainian Americans that resides in Los Angeles. The Ukrainian population of Los Angeles is the fourth largest Ukrainian population in a United States metropolitan area, behind New York City, Philadelphia, and Chicago, respectively.

== History ==
=== Immigration Patterns and Movements ===
There have been four major waves of immigration from Ukraine to the United States. The first wave of immigration occurred between 1890 and 1914 and was primarily composed of economic migrants seeking employment. The second wave occurred in between World War I and World War II. During World War II, a third wave occurred, which contained more political refugees than the first two waves of immigration. The current wave of immigration, known as the “fourth wave,” is economically driven with emigrants moving to find better living conditions and higher wages. While immigrants from the three previous waves tended to settle in Ukrainian communities in New York or Chicago, members of the fourth wave are increasingly settling in California, “choosing cities with more lucrative job opportunities.” The number of Ukrainians in California increased by 73.7%, from 54,141 to 94,044 people, from 1990 to 2006 while the number of Ukrainians decreased by -2.0% in New Jersey and only increased by 20.4% in New York. Now, 16.9% of all Ukrainian-Americans live in the Pacific Coast area, which is a 67.7% growth in share from 10.1% of the total population in 1990. The population of Ukrainian-Americans in the greater Los Angeles area increased by 23.6% from 21,398 people in 1990 to 26,456 people in 2006.

== Demographics ==
The 2010 United States Census reported 26,222 persons declaring themselves to be of partial or full Ukrainian ancestry living in the Los Angeles county area. Of this population, 15,872 were reported as being born in the U.S. while 10,350 were born in foreign countries. Of the foreign born, 27.8% emigrated between 1953 and 1987, and 68.9% emigrated between 1988 and 2010. The median age of the Ukrainian population in Los Angeles is 42 years old. 31.7% of the population is between 45 and 65 years old, and 22.5% of the population is older than 65. Roughly half of the population is male and half is female.

== Culture ==
=== Language ===
The two Eastern European languages primarily spoken by Ukrainians in Los Angeles are Russian and Ukrainian. As of 2010, 26.2% of Ukrainians in Los Angeles speak Russian at home and 6.4% speak Ukrainian. In the state of California, 26.0% of Ukrainians speak Russian and 18.5% speak Ukrainian at home.

=== Religion ===
Ukrainian-Americans in Los Angeles of the Christian faith are primarily either a member of the Ukrainian Orthodox Church or the Ukrainian Greek Catholic Church. In Los Angeles, there are two Ukrainian Orthodox churches, the Saint Andrew First Called Ukrainian Orthodox Church, and the Ukrainian Orthodox Church of Saint Vladimir (Volodymyr). There is also a Ukrainian Catholic Church, the Nativity of the Blessed Virgin Mary Ukrainian Catholic Church. All three churches were founded in the 1950s after the immigrant wave of Ukrainians that fled Soviet oppression and brutality during World War II fled Ukraine. These immigrants were interned at various Displaced Person's camps throughout Germany after World War II before finally arriving in Southern California.

Saint Andrew First Called Ukrainian Orthodox Church was founded by several families. After a thorough search was conducted for the location of the new parish, the site selected was high on a hilltop offering some of the most beautiful panoramic views of downtown Los Angeles, Century City and the entire Los Angeles basin, stretching all the way to the Pacific Ocean.^{[?]}

=== Political engagement ===
An anti-war rally called Rally Against Russian Invasion in Ukraine took place on Sunday, September 21, 2014 at the Wilshire Federal Building in Los Angeles, Ca. September 21 is the International Day of Peace, and marches for peace are held all over the world. The anti-war rally in Los Angeles consisted of a couple hundred Ukrainian-Americans, and they protested against Russia’s involvement in the conflict in Eastern Ukraine.

=== Diaspora Organizations ===
The California Association to Aid Ukraine (CAAU) is an all-voluntary, non-profit organization based in southern California that channels local support and fundraising for the people of Ukraine. The CAAU has partnered with the Cedars-Sinai Medical Center in Los Angeles to send medical equipment to Ukraine. They also pay to bring Ukrainian doctors to Los Angeles for training at Cedars-Sinai.

The Ukrainian Culture Center (UCC) is located at 4315 Melrose Ave in the East Hollywood area of Los Angeles. Founded in 1940, and celebrating its 70th anniversary in 2014, UCC hosts weekly children’s Ukrainian school and Ukrainian folk dancing for children and adults. Additionally, the Center hosts the Annual Pysanka Festival, the Taras Shevchenko Annual Commemoration, as well as yearly Ukrainian Independence celebrations and Holodomor remembrance events. The Holodomor remembers the 7 million Ukrainian genocide victims of the man-made famine that Soviet dictator Josef Stalin imposed on the Ukrainian nation in response to their attempts to gain freedom and build a democratic society. The Center is directed by Ukrainians and Americans of Ukrainian descent who are professionals in fields ranging from arts, entertainment, law and finance. The goals of UCC are to develop coordinate and guide the national civic life of its members and to conduct various activities intended to represent Ukrainian culture, preserve worthwhile customs and traditions of the Ukrainian people to resident of Southern California. The Center works closely with governmental leaders, both local and national, to achieve these goals. One of the most instrumental individuals in organizing UCC at its current location was Mykola Novak. In the 1960s, after locating the former Jensen Theatre as the new home for UCC, Mr. Novak not only negotiated an exceptional price for the building but later took a year sabbatical from his job in order to volunteer to repurpose the former movie theater for use by the Ukrainian community. Working days and evenings Mr Novak and other volunteers reconstructed the previously sloping floor of the theater and leveled it, completely restored the 1920s era theater to its former architectural glory including refurbishing and full restoration, but also updating the structure to then current building codes. This immense work was all done by local Ukrainians who not only volunteered their time but also donated all the needed building supplies and material. Though these community members only recently arrived to the Los Angeles area having lived in the Displaced Person's camps that permeated Germany after World War II, they were not fully established in their new lives in the United States but, nevertheless, donated many hours and dollars to build a new home for the Ukrainian Diaspora. The result was creating one of the most beautiful culture centers in all of the United States.

UCC also founded the Ukrainian National Museum in Ontario, California, publishes the "Visti" magazine to provide updates and communication to the region's Ukrainians, supports the Chervona Kalyna Ukrainian Folk Dance Troupe, and provides continued financial assistance to the Ridna Shkola of Los Angeles. Throughout the 1960s and 1970s UCC sponsored Captive Nation's week with the support of the Los Angeles Mayor's office to recognize and support those countries who remained dominated under Soviet oppression. UCC sent a delegation to the Democratic National Convention, and has worked in conjunction with other organizations representing Bulgarians, Croatians, Estonians, Hungarians, Latvians, Lithuanians, Poles, Romanians, Serbs and among others, more recently uniting for the Annual European Heritage Festival. UCC is the home of the nationally recognized choir "Kobzar" which has been led by such well known and astounding directors such as Volodymyr Bozhyk, who was also the co-conductor - along with Hryhory Kytasty - of the world-renowned Ukrainian Bandurist Chorus of Detroit, Michigan.

The Ukrainian Congress Committee of America (UCCA), the representative organization for the Ukrainian diaspora in the United States, has a branch in Los Angeles. The UCCA is an organization that "supports cultural, educational, and humanitarian activities that emphasize the Ukrainian American heritage and provide support for Ukraine's newly developing democracy."

== Sources ==
- Satzewich, Vic (2002). The Ukrainian diaspora. London: Routledge. ISBN 0415296587.
- Wolowyna, Oleh (25 October 2009). "Geographical dispersion of Ukrainians in the U.S.: 1990-2006" (43). The Ukrainian Weekly: Ukrainian National Association.
- Wolowyna, Oleh (13 December 2009). "Growth and decline of Ukrainians in metropolitan areas: 1990-2006". The Ukrainian Weekly: Ukrainian National Association.
- Shevchuk, Yuri (25 May 2003). "Small solutions, not grand illusions: Harvard symposium focuses on diaspora-Ukraine relationship". The Ukrainian Weekly: Ukrainian National Association.
