= Crimean Tatar Americans =

AQŞ Qırımtatarları امهرىقا قیریم تورکلری (Crimean Tatar)

Total population
- 7,000 (2001)

Regions with significant populations
- New York City, Chicago, Detroit

Languages
- American English · Crimean Tatar · Turkish · Russian

Religion
- Majority Sunni Islam

Crimean Tatar Americans (Crimean Tatar: AQŞ Qırımtatarları / امهرىقا قیریم تورکلری) are Americans of full or partial Crimean Tatar ancestry.

According to the 2001 US census, the number of Crimean Tatars living in the US is approximately 7,000. Most of them live in New York City (primarily in Brooklyn and Queens), Chicago and Detroit.

== Overview ==
The first wave of Crimean Tatar emigration took place in the early 1920s. The primary causes were the Russian Civil War and the Crimean famine of 1921–1923, which prompted thousands of Crimean Tatars to leave the region. Many migrated first to Turkey, from where some later relocated to the United States.

The second wave occurred in the early 1930s, following Soviet policies in Crimea aimed at reversing earlier indigenization measures related to Crimean Tatar cultural and political autonomy. This period was marked by political repression targeting the Crimean Tatar intelligentsia, community leaders, and religious figures. In rural areas, collectivization led to dispossession, forced resettlement, and economic hardship among middle- and upper-income households. These developments coincided with the broader famine affecting the Soviet Union, including Holodomor.

The third wave of emigration followed the aftermath of World War II. In 1944, during the withdrawal of German and Romanian forces from Crimea, approximately 10,000 Crimean Tatars—including refugees, displaced persons, and individuals associated with Axis-controlled territories—were evacuated by sea to Romania. Around 5,000 later returned to the Soviet Union, either voluntarily or through repatriation agreements. Others remained abroad, primarily in Romania, Bulgaria, Austria and Germany, before many later resettled in Turkey. Economic difficulties in Turkey during the late 1950s, along with political changes in East Europe, contributed to further migration to the United States.

The fourth wave began after the dissolution of the Soviet Union and the economic instability that followed in post-Soviet states, including Ukraine. During this period, Crimean Tatars emigrated to the United States alongside other migrants from Ukraine and the former Soviet republics. Migration slowed for a period but resumed after the Annexation of Crimea by the Russian Federation in 2014.

== Organizations ==
One of the oldest and most significant organizations dedicated to meeting the various social, cultural, and religious needs of members of the diaspora is the American Association of Crimean Turks, Inc (Crimean Tatar: Qırım Türkleri Amerika Cemiyeti, Turkish: Kırım Türkleri Amerikan Birliği). Founded in 1961, the society implements programs to teach children and youth national history and language, hosts various cultural events, and celebrates national and Muslim holidays. The first Crimean Tatar community center for cultural events was located in the Flatbush section of Brooklyn, New York City. Subsequently, between 1961 and 1972, the center was moved to various locations around the city.
