= Crimean Tatar diaspora =

People of Crimean Tatar heritage who live outside Crimea

The Crimean Tatar diaspora dates back to the annexation of Crimea by Russia in 1783, after which Crimean Tatars emigrated in a series of waves spanning the period from 1783 to 1917. The diaspora was largely the result of the destruction of their social and economic life as a consequence of integration into the Russian Empire.

The Soviet Union brought about the final dispersal of Crimean Tatars in 1944, in the midst of World War II, when it deported all Crimean Tatars remaining in the Crimea to the Central Asia and Urals. This population is considered an exiled community rather than a diaspora.

== Experiences in exile within the Ottoman Empire ==
There have been continuously members of Crimean nobility in the Ottoman Empire, due to close relations between the two states. There was a Giray vassal state in the Ottoman province of Bucak (Bessarabia). It was centered on the towns of Bender and Çatal Osman, and considered semi-independent (only controlled by Ottoman Pasha in Rusçuk). In the 14th and 15th centuries, Ottomans colonized Dobruja with Crimean Tatars from Bucak. Between 1593 and 1595, Crimean Tatars were also settled to Dobruja. (Frederick de Jong) Some Crimean Tatars went to Greece and Turkey.

However, the first Crimean Tatar emigration took place after the Russian annexation of Crimea. Crimean Tatar ruling class (mirzas) and mullahs sought asylum within the North Caucasian people, fearing persecution. Their number were around 8,000. Their relations to Crimea continued from their Caucasian safe havens. Hopes that a Giray from the Caucasus would return to liberate Crimea continued until the very conquest of North Caucasus by the Russians in 1859. The Crimean Tatars in the North Caucasus were exiled to Anatolia in 1877-1878 together with Circassians and Chechens by the Russian Empire. The exiled Muslims from the North Caucasus were around one million.

After the annexation, 4,000 Tatars also escaped to westward direction to the Ottoman fortress of Ozu (Ochakov), and from there to the Ottoman province of Bucak (Bessarabia) where the Giray dynasty existed. With the conquest of Bessarabia by the Russians in 1812, all Crimean Tatars here migrated southwards, to the Dobruja province.

Crimean Tatars immigrated to the Ottoman Empire, where they were welcomed as fellow Muslims and as the populace of the formerly protected Crimean Khanate. The Ottoman territory was called "aq topraq" ("bright land" or more probably "land of justice") by the Crimean Tatar immigrants, as they conceived of their migration as a "hijra" similar to the prophet's temporary retreat to Medina under the pressure from enemies of Islam. The outflow of the Crimean Tatars turned into an exodus after the Crimean War (1854–1856), as the Russian government began to treat the Crimean Tatars as internal threats to its security because of their historical relations with the Ottoman Empire.

The majority of the Crimean Tatar immigrants were settled in the Dobruja region of the Balkans by the Ottoman authorities, but some were directed to various parts of Anatolia, where significant numbers of Crimean Tatars perished due to changes in environmental and climate conditions.

Although there were Crimean Tatars who emigrated from the mountainous, coastal, and urban parts of the Crimea among them, the majority of the emigrants were from the steppes of Crimea and its surroundings, who lived largely in closed peasant communities. According to ancient Crimean Tatar traditions, marriage between relatives (e.g. cousins), even very distant ones, has always been strictly prohibited, unlike the local population of Anatolia. The ones who lived in a concentrated manner in adjacent villages, such as the ones around Eskişehir region, were able to maintain their ethnic identity and language intact almost up until the 1970s. The Crimean Tatar diaspora identity emerged over this period in the form of predominantly oral cultural traditions in stories, songs, poems, myths, and legends about the loss of the "homeland" and the miseries of immigration.

An excerpt from Crimean Tatar exile literature is as follows:

The angry and wild Black Sea roared,
Rushed to extinguish my burning motherland.
The old Çatırdağ, distressed and worried,
"Where are the Tatars going?" she cried.

Eskender Fazıl, from his poem Stand Up

== The end of the Ottoman Empire and the creation of modern Turkey ==
With the shrinking of the Ottoman Empire in the last quarter of the 19th century, once again the majority of the Crimean Tatars in Dobrudja migrated to Anatolia, and sometimes re-migrated several times more within Anatolia. This pattern of immigration contributed to the severing of kinship ties, and hence ties to the homeland, amalgamating the previously more segregated sub-groups of Crimean Tatars.

The Crimean Tatars participated in the building of the new Turkish Republic, as well as the formation of the core Turkish identity. People of Crimean Tatar descent in Turkey number around 1 million.

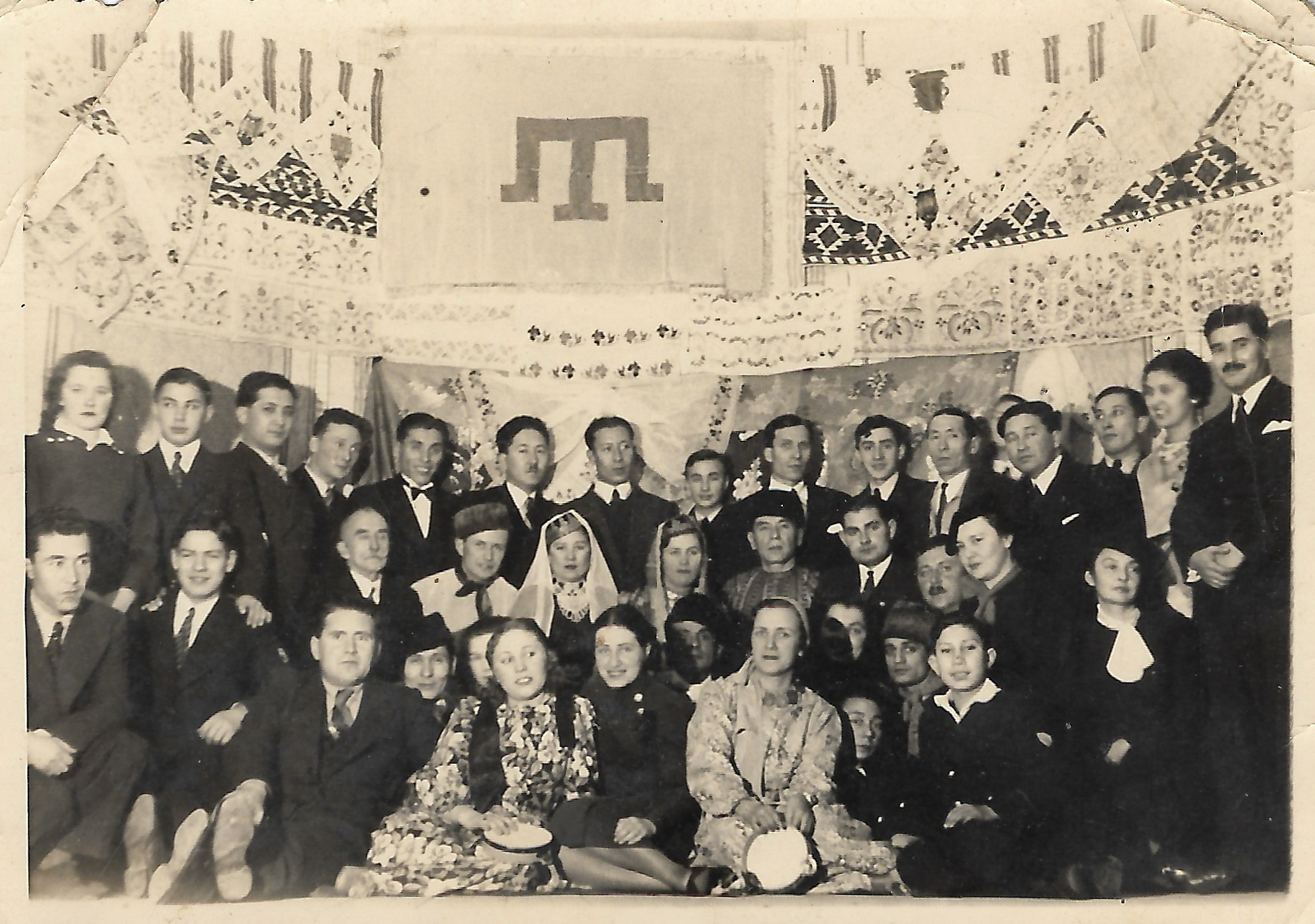
Crimean Tatar Colony in 1930s. Among them are activists Mustafa Edige Kırımal, Abdullah Zihni Soysal, Müstecip Ülküsal

A small number of Crimean Tatar refugees from the USSR joined the diaspora in Turkey after World War II, and a small number migrated from Romania and Bulgaria to Turkey after the decline of communism. The Crimean Tatar diaspora in Turkey established several ethnic associations.

== Exile within the Soviet Union ==
On May 18, 1944, the Soviet government deported the Crimean Tatars who were left in Crimea to Central Asia and Urals. After 1989, nearly 300,000 Tatars were able to return to Crimea from their places of deportation. Their return was met with the strong opposition of the rest of the population of Crimea. Another roughly 270,000 Crimean Tatars remain in Uzbekistan and other parts of the former Soviet Union. This population is best considered as an exiled community rather than a diaspora, although they might develop into a diaspora if their exile is prolonged.

== Diaspora within the Eastern Bloc and elsewhere ==
=== Romania ===
The Crimean Tatar community in Romania, today numbering 24,000 (2002 Romanian Census) had been a very vibrant one until the beginning of the communist era in Romania. It has also recently experienced an ethnic revival and renewal of links with the homeland, as well as with other diaspora communities, particularly the one in Turkey.

=== Bulgaria ===
The Crimean Tatar diaspora community in Bulgaria number only in the thousands, but they also recently began to link themselves with their co-ethnics abroad, and especially with the repatriated Crimean Tatars.

=== United States ===
The Crimean Tatars in the United States are the highest number of the diaspora in the Western hemisphere; they are composed of refugees from Crimea, Romania, Bulgaria and Greece. Within the United States, the vast majority are concentrated along with other large post-Soviet refugee communities in New York City, particularly the neighborhood of Soho, wherein some conflict exists with extant ethnic Russian diaspora communities.

- The American Association of Crimean Turks was founded on November 14, 1961 in Brooklyn, New York with a purpose of preserving ethnic, religious and national identity in the United States of America.
- Crimean Tatar Foundation USA was established in 2023 and supports Crimean Tatar People by building strategic partnerships, integrating Crimean Tatar perspectives into Western academia, providing humanitarian aid, promoting cultural and political advocacy, preserving Crimean Tatar heritage in the US, advancing gender equality through the leadership of women from diverse countries, and contributing to space policy research and development that strengthens the position of indigenous peoples in the global community while fostering innovation through international collaboration.

== Recent challenges ==
The main challenges to the Crimean Tatar diaspora in the 1990s were the erosion of ethnic identity as a result of swift modernization of communities and the consequent difficulties in mobilization of resources among the apathetic diaspora members (especially in Turkey) in order to support the repatriation of co-ethnics. As in other diasporas, diaspora political activity is mostly conducted by elites and ethnic organizations.

As in other diasporas, Crimean Tatars also suffered from problems stemming from the differentiation of their identities over time due to their acculturation into various host-societies. In the last decade, the various diaspora communities, as well as the homeland community, have been ardently negotiating what it means to be a "Crimean Tatar", seeking an agreement on a common sense of identity.

There are also differences among Crimean Tatars as to what the goals of the diaspora and the national movement should be and how to reach those goals, leading to a lively internal politics.

In 2022, an estimated 1,000 Crimean Tatars fled to Turkey to escape Russian mobilization. Earlier, Crimean presidential representative Tasheva said indigenous Crimean Tatars were being disproportionately recruited for the war in occupied Crimea.

== See also ==
- Lipka Tatars
- Crimean Tatars in Romania
- Crimean Tatars in Bulgaria
- Crimean Tatars
- Crimean Khanate
- List of Crimean Tatars
- List of Crimean khans
- Giray Dynasty
- Crimean Tatar Americans
