= American Association of Crimean Turks, Inc =

US organization for Crimean Tatars

- Qırım Türkleri Amerika Cemiyeti
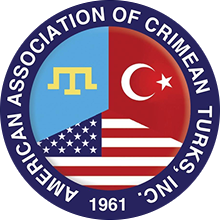
- Abbreviation: AACT
- Formation: November 14, 1961; 65 years ago
- Founder: Ibrahim Dulber; Mehmet Sevdiyar; Refat Ilkson; Etem Celebi; Sevket Dolan; Feride Yakup; Refat Ibrahim
- Type: Non-profit NGO
- Purpose: Promote Crimean Tatar language and culture
- Headquarters: Brooklyn, New York City
- Coordinates: 40°38′22.3″N 73°59′38.11″W
- Website: https://www.kirimny.org/

American Association of Crimean Turks, Inc (Crimean Tatar: Qırım Türkleri Amerika Cemiyeti, Turkish: Kırım Türkleri Amerikan Birliği; abbreviated AACT) is one of the oldest and most significant cultural and educational organizations of the Crimean Tatar diaspora in the United States. It is a non-profit organization in Brooklyn, New York City.

The mission of the association is to preserve the cultural, ethnic, and religious interests of Crimean Tatars in the United States

== History ==
The American Society of Crimean Tatars was founded on November 14, 1961, in Brooklyn, New York, with the aim of preserving the ethnic, religious, and national identity of the Crimean Tatar diaspora in the United States.

Since its establishment, the organization has engaged in social and human rights advocacy, seeking to raise international awareness of the situation of Crimean Tatars in the Soviet Union. Members of the society regularly organized pickets outside the United Nations headquarters in New York City to protest human rights violations and advocate for the restoration of the Crimean Tatars’ right to return to Crimea.

Following these demonstrations, society members also organized memorial ceremonies, including religious services honoring the victims of persecution and the deportation of the Crimean Tatar people. Over time, these commemorative events became a longstanding tradition and continue to be held.

In 1986, with the support of the American Society of Crimean Tatars, the first monument in the United States dedicated to the Crimean Tatar deportation on May 18, 1944, was erected at Washington Memorial Park on Long Island.

In 2020, Fikret Yurter, one of the society's founders, died. His death was regarded as a significant loss for the Crimean Tatar community in the United States. For many years, Yurter was among the organization's most active representatives, contributing to the preservation of Crimean Tatar national identity and raising international awareness of their situation in the Soviet Union. He wrote and commented in American and international media on human rights violations against Crimean Tatars, supported members of the national movement persecuted by Soviet authorities, and helped organize demonstrations and pickets at the United Nations headquarters in New York City.

In 2021, the organization marked its 60th anniversary.

== Mission ==
- Protecting the national identity, language, traditions, and customs of Crimean Tatars among new generations of immigrants.
- Establishing a community center and mosque in Brooklyn for the joint celebration of religious holidays (Eid al-Fitr, Eid al-Adha) and rituals.
- Educating youth through language courses, history lessons, and rehearsals for community dance and music groups.
- Providing social, legal, and moral support to newly arrived compatriots for their integration into American society.
- Introducing the history, art, and culture of Crimea to the American public through open festivals, concerts, and exhibitions.
- Supporting researchers, historians, and students studying Turkic peoples and the history of the Crimean Peninsula.
- Fundraising and providing material assistance to compatriots in need both in the United States and abroad (including humanitarian projects).
- Holding annual memorial events dedicated to the Day of Remembrance of the Victims of the Deportation of the Crimean Tatar People (May 18) to raise awareness among the international community.
