= Ukraine Freedom Support Act of 2014 =

- Long title: To impose sanctions with respect to the Russian Federation, to provide additional assistance to Ukraine, and for other purposes.
- Enacted by: the 113th United States Congress
- Effective: December 18, 2014

Citations
- Public law: Pub. L. 113–272 (text) (PDF)

Legislative history
- Introduced in the House as H.R. 5859 by Jim Gerlach (R–PA) on December 11, 2014; Committee consideration by House Foreign Affairs, House Financial Services, House Oversight and Government Reform, and House Judiciary; Passed the House on December 11, 2014; Passed the Senate on December 13, 2014 (voice vote); Signed into law by President Barack Obama on December 18, 2014

Ukraine Freedom Support Act of 2014 (H.R. 5859) is a United States law enacted by the 113th Congress to address the Russian military intervention in Ukraine. Ukraine Freedom Support Act (S. 2828) was introduced in the Senate by Senator Bob Menendez on September 16, 2014 and co-sponsored by fourteen other senators. The final version was signed into law by President Barack Obama on December 18, 2014.

Ukraine Freedom Support Act is preceded by similar congressional bills, particularly Ukraine Support Act and Support for the Sovereignty, Integrity, Democracy, and Economic Stability of Ukraine Act of 2014.

== Provisions ==
The act envisages several provisions. In particular, it affirmed that "it is U.S. policy to assist the government of Ukraine in restoring its sovereignty and territorial integrity in order to deter the government of the Russian Federation from further destabilizing and invading Ukraine and other independent countries in Eastern Europe and Central Asia". The act also directed Barack Obama to impose "three or more specified sanctions" against three entities: Rosoboronexport, "an entity owned by the government of the Russian Federation or controlled by its nationals that transfers or brokers the transfer to, or knowingly manufactures or sells defense articles transferred to, Syria or into the territory of a specified country without its government's consent" or "a person (individual or entity) that knowingly sponsors or provides financial, material, or technological support for, or goods or services to or in support of, such an entity".
