= Ukrainian Americans =

Americans of Ukrainian birth or descent

Українські американці (Ukrainian)
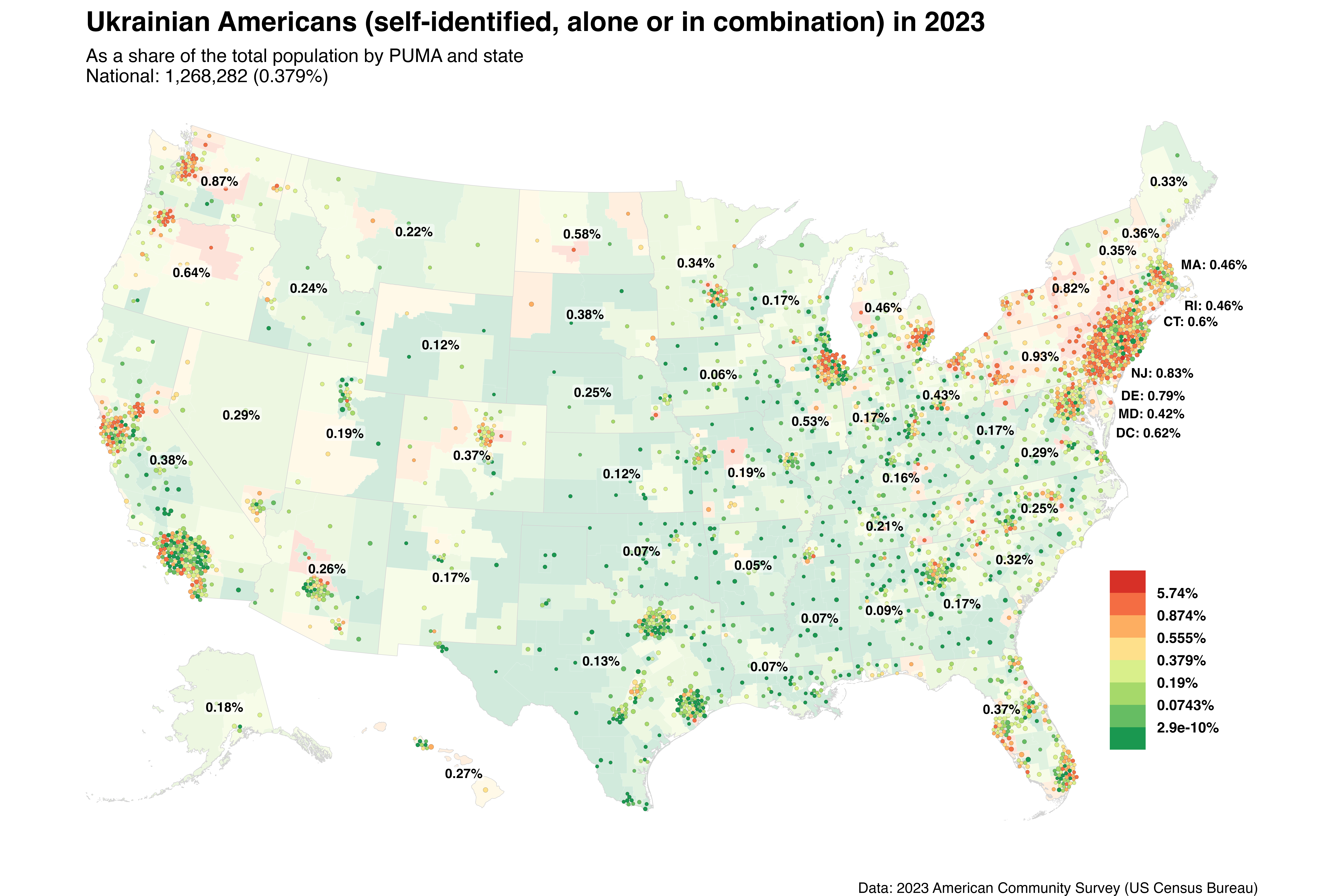

Total population
- 1,258,979 (0.38%); 2023 estimate, self reported

Regions with significant populations
- New York City Metropolitan Area,Rochester Metropolitan Area, Rust Belt (Pennsylvania, Ohio, Michigan, Indiana, Illinois), Midwest (Minnesota, North Dakota), Greater Los Angeles Area, Sacramento, Alaska, Washington state, and the Pacific Northwest in general, Maryland, Florida, Virginia, Texas, Arizona, Colorado, North Carolina, Georgia

Languages
- Predominantly English and Ukrainian; Occasionally Russian and Yiddish

Religion
- Predominantly Ukrainian Orthodox and Ukrainian Greek Catholic, with Protestant, Baptist, Pentecostal and Jewish minorities

Related ethnic groups
- Rusyn Americans, Russian Americans, Belarusian Americans, Polish Americans, Crimean Tatar Americans

Ukrainian Americans are Americans who are of full or partial Ukrainian ancestry. According to U.S. census estimates, in 2021 there were 1,017,586 Americans of Ukrainian descent representing 0.3% of the American population. The Ukrainian population of the United States is thus the second largest outside the former Eastern Bloc; only Canada has a larger Ukrainian community under this definition. According to the 2000 U.S. census, the metropolitan areas with the largest numbers of Ukrainian Americans are: New York City with 160,000; Philadelphia with 60,000; Chicago with 46,000; Detroit with 45,000; Los Angeles with 36,000; Cleveland with 26,000; Sacramento with 20,000; and Indianapolis with 19,000. In 2018, the number of Ukrainian Americans surpassed 1 million.

Despite the United States’s much larger total population, Ukrainian Americans are outnumbered in absolute numbers by their Canadian counterparts. They are one of the few, if not the only, ethnic groups in North America for which this is the case. In contrast, most other groups—including Indian, Chinese, Filipino, and Indigenous communities—represent a larger share of the population in Canada but remain more numerous in the United States due to its much larger overall population.

== History ==
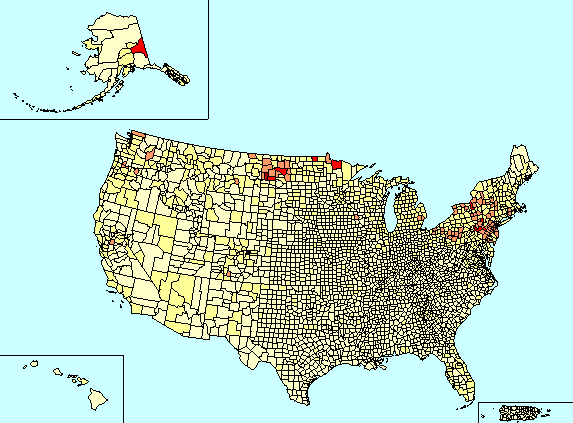
Distribution of Ukrainian Americans, as a percentage of the population, according to the 2000 census.

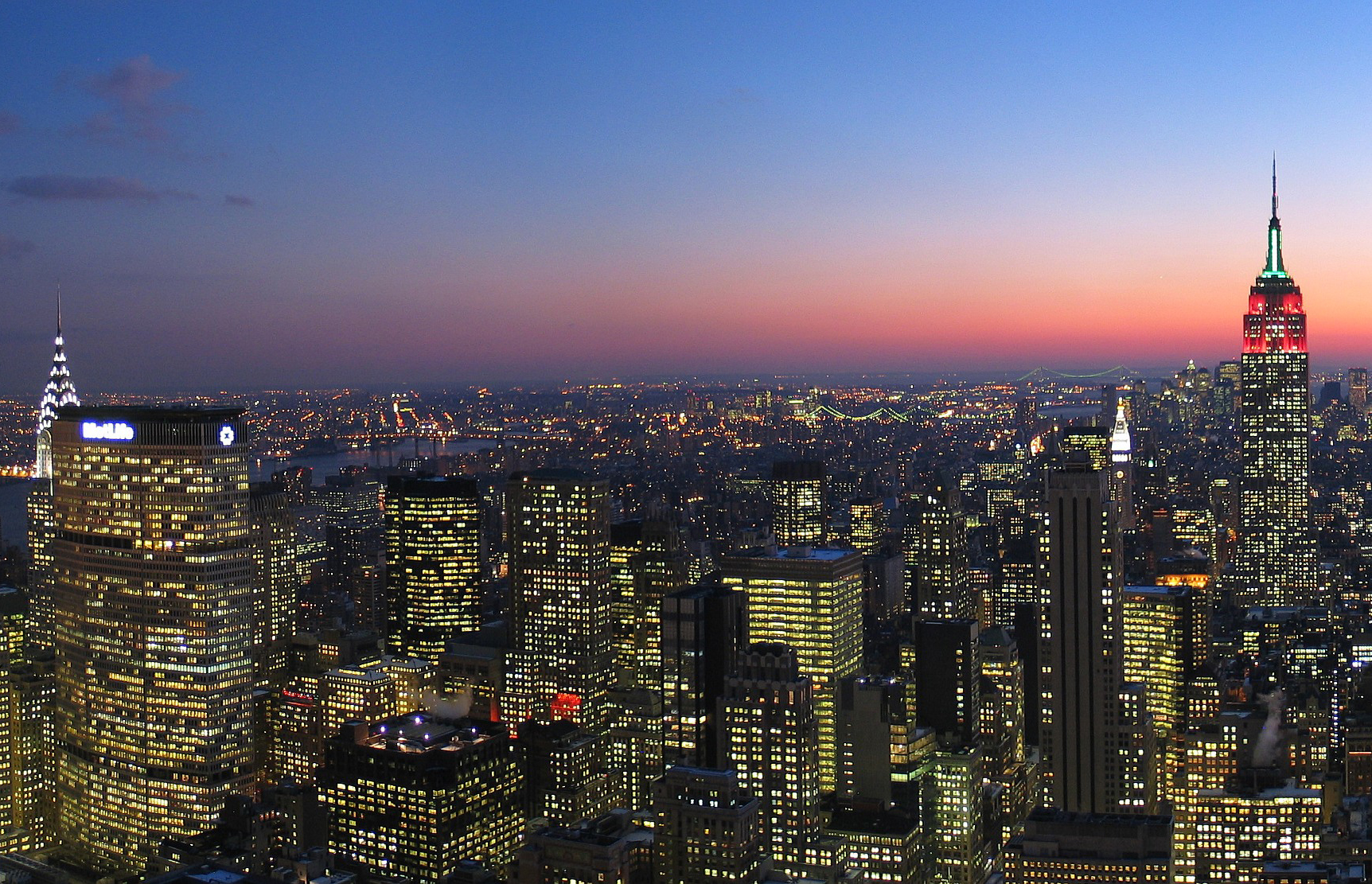
The New York City Metropolitan Area, including Brighton Beach in Brooklyn, New York, and Fair Lawn in Bergen County, New Jersey, is home to by far the largest Ukrainian population in the United States.

Large-scale Ukrainian immigration to America did not begin until the 1880s. Between 1870 and 1914, the majority of Ukrainian immigrants came from Austro-Hungary (Galicia and other regions). They were described as Ruthenians, and many arrived in New York City and Pennsylvania. In 1899 estimates of the number of Ukrainians in the US ranged from 200,000 to 500,000. The Ukrainian National Association (Ukrainian: Український народний союз), known before 1914 as the Ruthenian National Union (Ukrainian: Руський Народний Союз) was founded in Shamokin, Pennsylvania, on February 22, 1894.

Between 1920 and 1939, about 40,000 more Ukrainians arrived, mostly from Western Ukraine. After World War II, about 85,000 Ukrainian displaced persons emigrated to the United States from Europe.

From 1955 to 1965, St. Andrew Memorial Church in South Bound Brook, New Jersey, was constructed as a memorial honoring victims of the Holodomor of 1932–1933.

The largest wave of Ukrainians came in the early 1990s, after the 1991 fall of the Soviet Union. Some of those emigrating from Ukraine after the fall of the Soviet Union were Jewish or Protestant. Many Ukrainians of the newest immigration wave settled in large cities and regional centers, forming ethnic enclaves. In addition, many Ukrainian Americans arrived by way of Canada, which has a larger Ukrainian presence.

On September 11, 2001, 11 Ukrainian Americans perished at the World Trade Center in New York City during the acts of mass terrorism committed on that day. All of their names were listed and commemorated by Ukrinform, the National News Agency of Ukraine, during the nineteenth anniversary of the attacks in 2020.

Ukrainian Americans living in Northern New Jersey and the remainder of the Northeastern United States have long been politically vocal about Ukrainian affairs, often traveling to Washington, D.C., to express their concerns.

In Bloomingdale (near Chicago) on September 21, 2015, Filaret, the Ukrainian Orthodox Patriarch of Kyiv and All Rus'-Ukraine, consecrated the first North American monument to the Revolution of Dignity's "Heavenly Hundred".

In February 2022, the Pastor Right Reverend Mitred Archpriest Philip Weiner, the leader of St. Josaphat's Ukrainian Catholic Church in Rochester, New York, said that there were more than 40,000 Ukrainians in the Rochester metropolitan area, which would make it one of the largest Ukrainian American communities in the country.

There are a large number of Ukrainian Protestants in the Sacramento metropolitan area who have organized support to those affected by the invasion of Ukraine through their local congregations.

It is estimated that during 2022–2023, around 300,000 Ukrainians have sought asylum in the United States through various means, making the U.S. the fifth-largest destination for refugees of the Russian invasion of Ukraine, and also making Ukrainians one of the fastest-growing ethnic groups in the United States that don't originate from the American continent.

== Religion ==
Most American Ukrainians are Christians (Orthodox, Catholics, Baptists, Evangelicals).

== Demographics ==
Ukrainian language in the United States

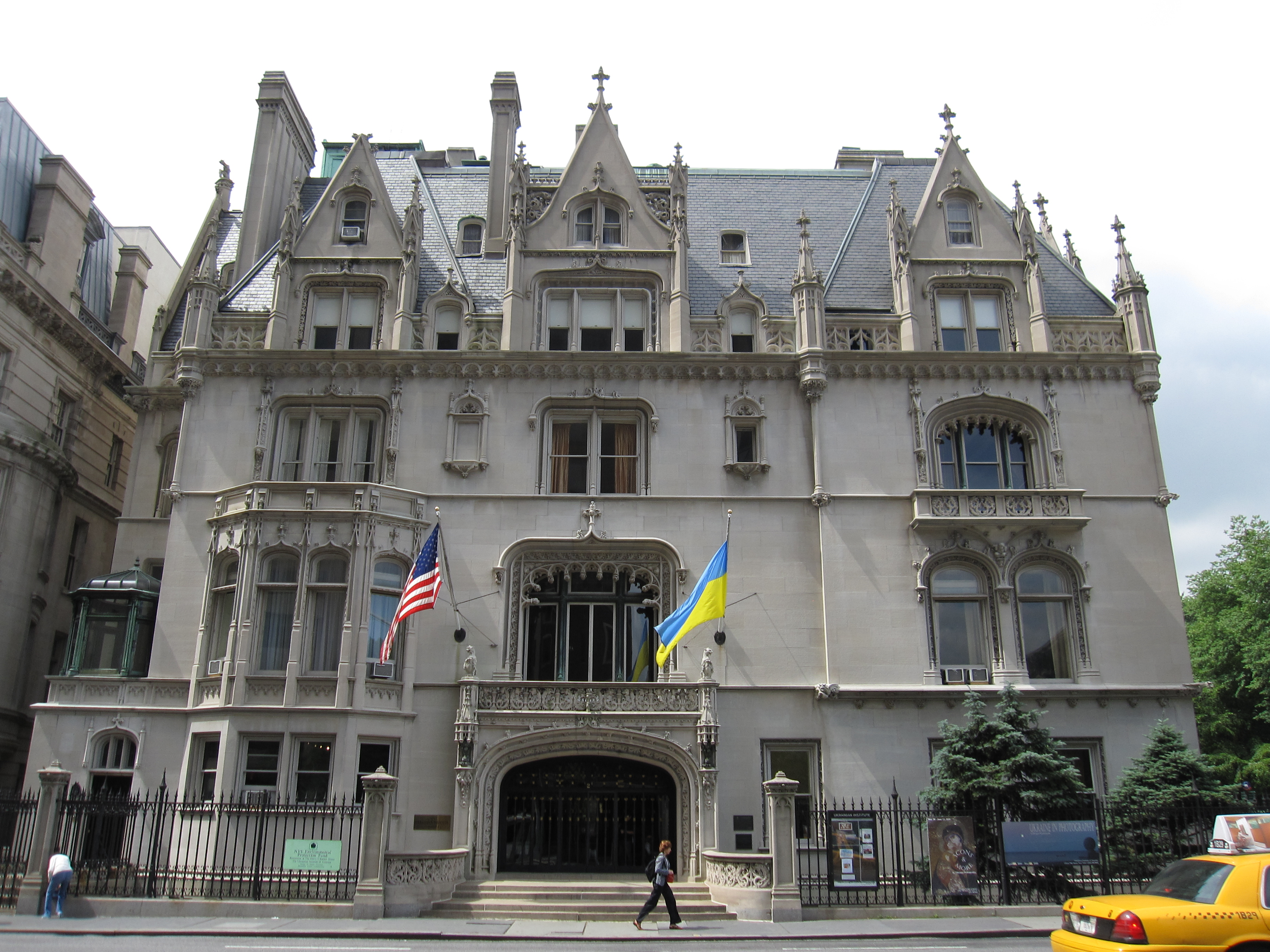
Ukrainian Institute of America, on Fifth Avenue, Manhattan, New York City.

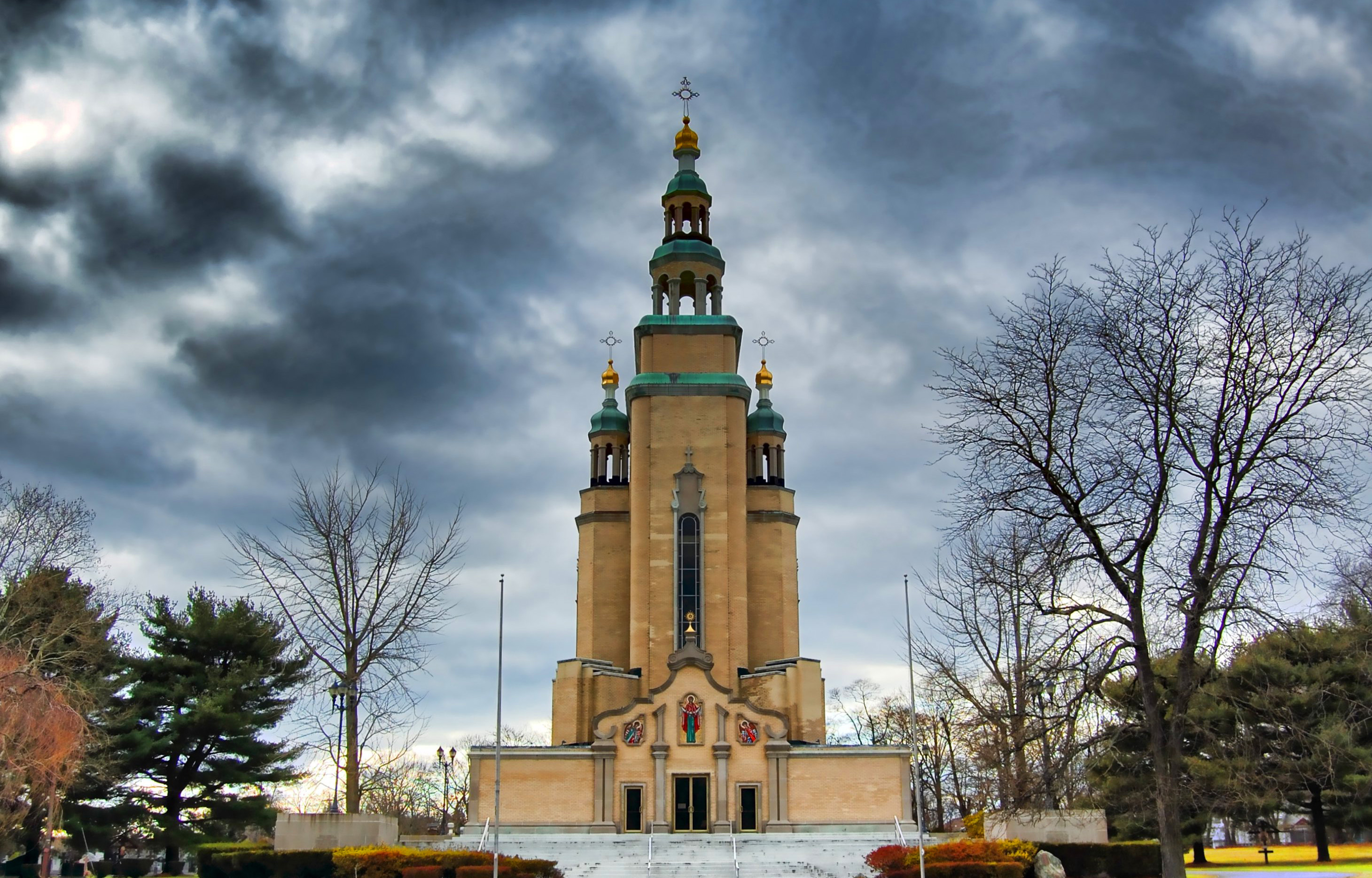
St. Andrew Memorial Church in South Bound Brook, New Jersey was constructed as a memorial honoring victims of the Holodomor and serves as the headquarters of the Ukrainian Orthodox Church of the USA.

As of the 2000 U.S. census, there were 892,922 Americans of full or partial Ukrainian descent. The New York City Metropolitan Area contains by far the largest Ukrainian community in the United States, due to historically receiving the highest number of Ukrainian immigrants.

The U.S. states with the largest Ukrainian populations are as follows:

| New York | 148,700 |
| Pennsylvania | 122,291 |
| California | 83,125 |
| New Jersey | 73,809 |
| Ohio | 48,908 |
| Illinois | 47,623 |

The total number of people born in Ukraine is more than 275,155 residents.

=== Ukrainian-born population ===
Ukrainian-born population in the U.S. since 2010:

| Year | Number |
|---|---|
| 2010 | 326,493 |
| 2011 | ▲340,468 |
| 2012 | ▲342,971 |
| 2013 | ▲345,187 |
| 2014 | ▼332,145 |
| 2015 | ▲345,620 |
| 2016 | ▲347,759 |
| 2017 | ▲354,494 |
| 2018 | ▼325,885 |
| 2019 | ▲354,832 |
| 2020 | ▲358,823 |
| 2021 | ▲398,040 |

=== U.S. communities with high percentages of people of Ukrainian ancestry ===
"Ukrainians in US rally as war fears mount" — 2022 video from VOA about the Ukrainian American community's reaction to the pending Russian invasion of Ukraine.

The top 20 U.S. communities with the highest percentage of people claiming Ukrainian ancestry are:

1. Cass Township, Pennsylvania (Schuylkill County, Pennsylvania) 14.30%
2. Belfield, North Dakota 13.60%
3. Gulich Township, Pennsylvania 12.70%
4. Gilberton, Pennsylvania 12.40%
5. Wilton, North Dakota 10.30%
6. Lumberland, New York 9.90%
7. Saint Clair, Pennsylvania 8.80%
8. Soap Lake, Washington 8.10%
9. Frackville, Pennsylvania 7.60%
10. Olyphant, Pennsylvania and Norwegian Township, Pennsylvania 7.00%
11. Houtzdale, Pennsylvania 6.90%
12. Harmony Township, Pennsylvania (Beaver County, Pennsylvania) and Kerhonkson, New York 6.70%
13. Baden, Pennsylvania and McAdoo, Pennsylvania 5.90%
14. Branch Township, Pennsylvania and Postville, Iowa 5.70%
15. Woodward Township, Pennsylvania (Clearfield County, Pennsylvania) and Northampton, Pennsylvania 5.60%
16. Warren, New York and Independence, Ohio 5.50%
17. West Leechburg, Pennsylvania 5.40%
18. Ambridge, Pennsylvania, Mount Carmel Township, Pennsylvania, and Parma, Ohio 5.30%
19. Ford City, Pennsylvania 5.20%
20. Bigler Township, Pennsylvania and Kline Township, Pennsylvania 5.10%
21. Mayfield Heights, Ohio 3.4%

=== U.S. communities with the highest percentage of residents born in Ukraine ===
Top 20 U.S. communities with the highest percentage of residents born in Ukraine are:

1. Delta Junction, AK 16.4%
2. Deltana, AK 8.4%
3. Hamtramck, MI 8.0%
4. West Hollywood, CA 7.8%
5. Lumberland, NY 6.3%
6. Moses Lake North, WA 6.0%
7. Soap Lake, WA 6.0%
8. Postville, IA 5.9%
9. Warren, MI 4.0%
10. Chicago, IL 4.0%
11. Webster, NY 4.8%
12. Peaceful Valley, WA 4.8%
13. Pikesville, MD 4.5%
14. Kerhonkson, NY 3.9%
15. North Highlands, CA 3.6%
16. Rancho Cordova, CA 3.3%
17. Oak Park, MI 3.0%
18. Flying Hills, PA 3.2%
19. Waverly, NE 3.2%
20. Fair Lawn, NJ 3.1%
21. Buffalo Grove, IL 2.8%
22. Feasterville-Trevose, PA 2.6%
23. Smallwood, NY 2.5%
24. Solvay, NY 2.5%
25. North Port, FL 2.4%
26. Detroit, MI 1.0%

== See also ==
- European Americans
- The Ukrainian Museum (New York City)
- Ukrainian American Veterans
- Ukrainian Americans in New York City
- Ukrainian Americans in Los Angeles
- Ukrainian Catholic Archeparchy of Philadelphia
- Ukrainian Congress Committee of America
- Ukrainian Orthodox Church of the USA
- Ukraine–United States relations
- American Coalition for Ukraine
- Nova Ukraine

== Sources ==
- Kuropas, Myron B.; Shust, Maria; Pevna, Chrystyna (1984). To Preserve A Heritage: The Story of the Ukrainian Immigration in the United States. New York: The Ukrainian Museum. 84-050811.
- Magocsi, Paul R., ed. (1979), The Ukrainian Experience in the United States: A Symposium, Sources and Documents, Cambridge, Massachusetts: Harvard Ukrainian Research Institute, ISBN 0-916458-04-0
